= Anyang, Gyeonggi =

City in South Korea

Coordinates: 37°23′N 126°56′E

Anyang
- Specific city
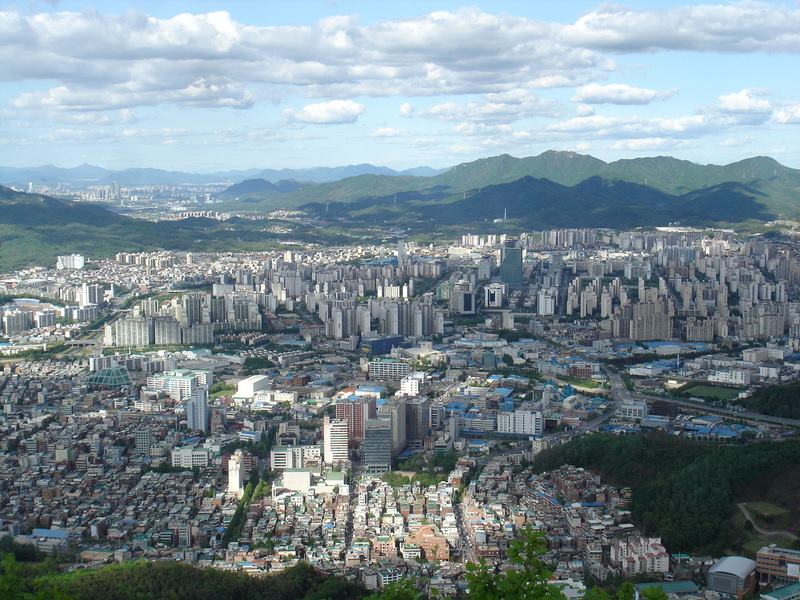
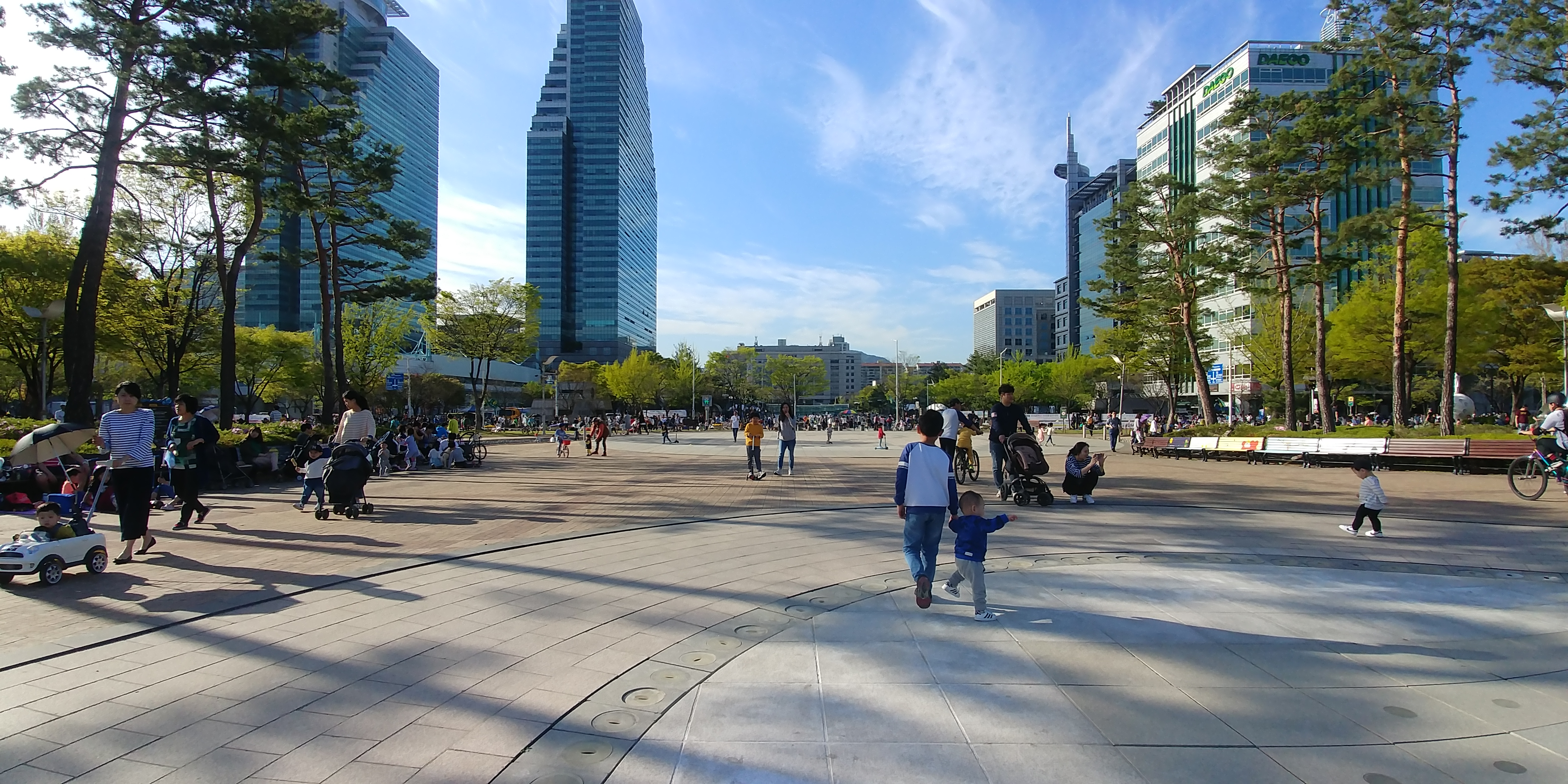
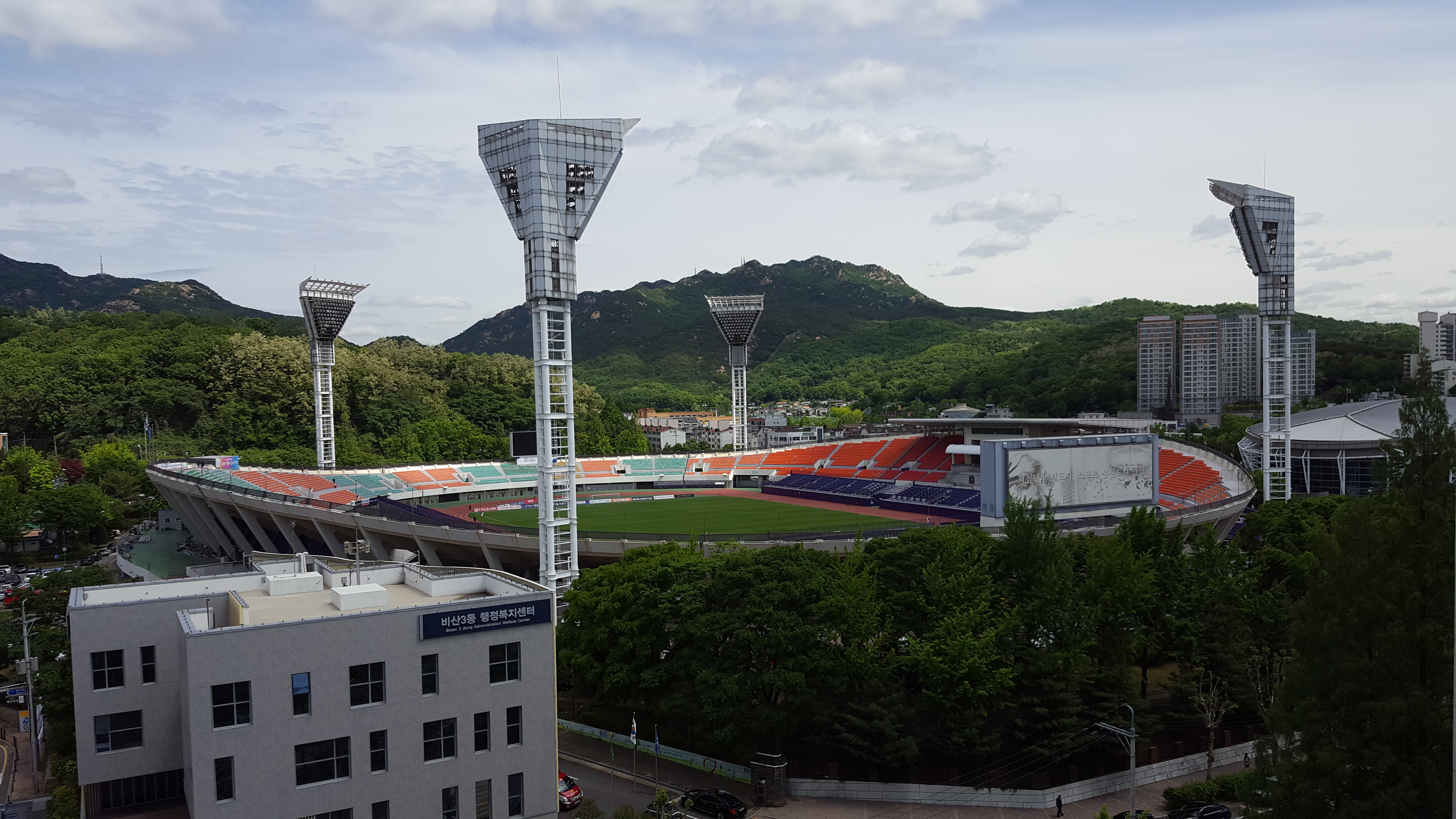
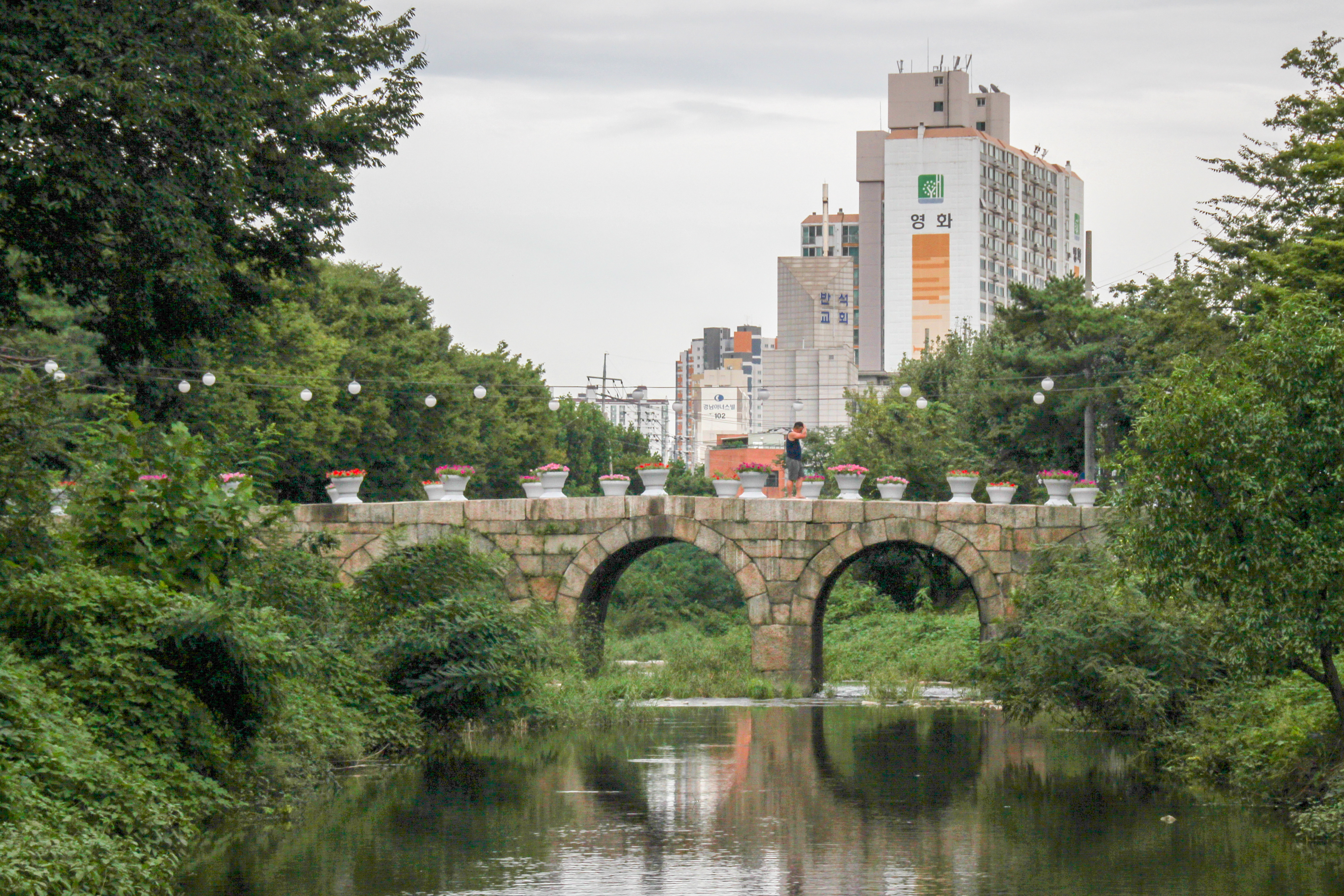
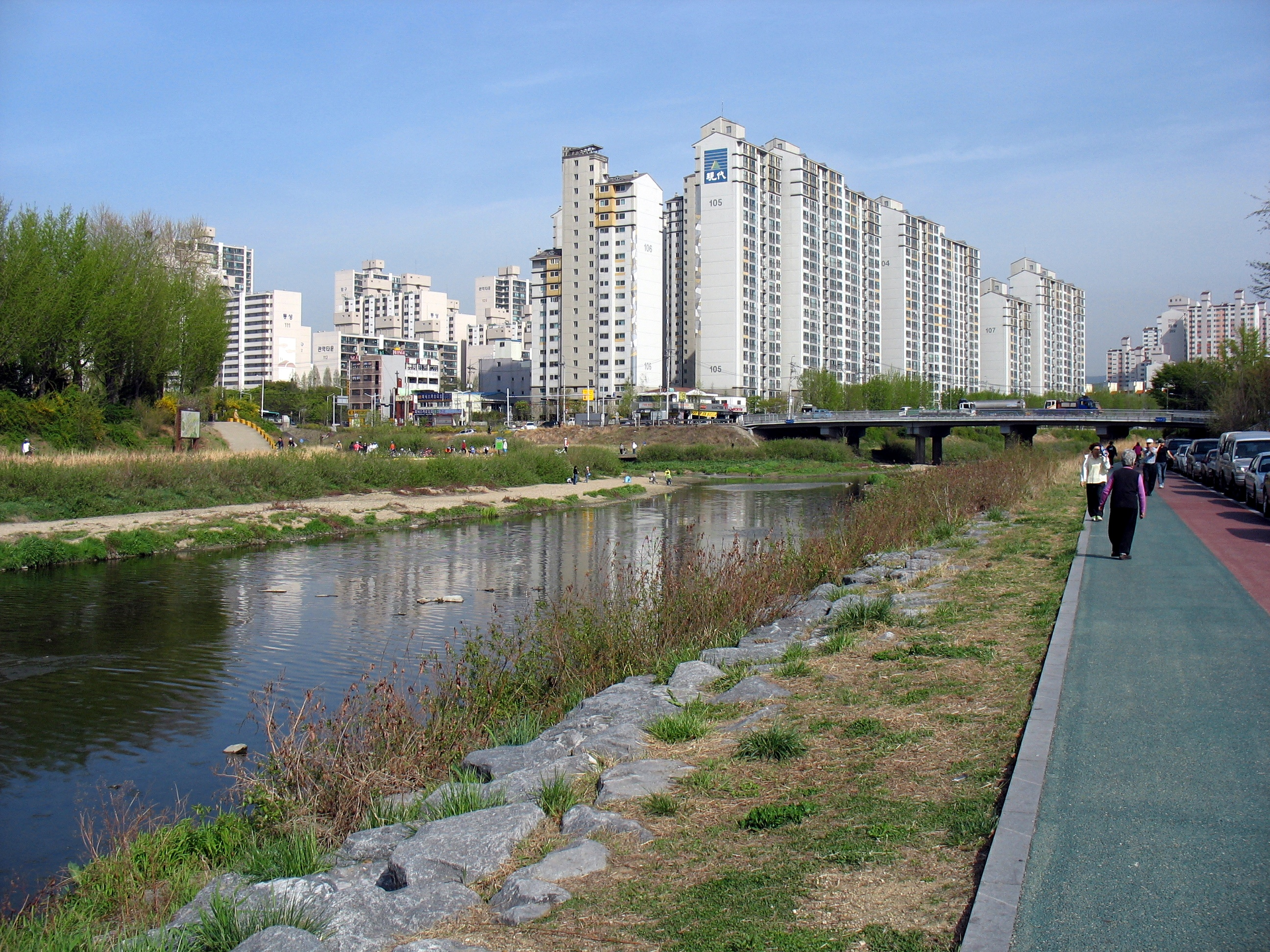
- Anyang from Surisan Pyeongchon Central Park Anyang Stadium Manan Bridge Anyangcheon

- Flag Emblem

- Location in South Korea
- Country: South Korea
- Region: Gyeonggi Province (Sudogwon)
- First mention: 415
- City status: 1967
- Administrative divisions: 2 gu (Manan District & Dongan District), 31 dong

Area
  - Total: 58.46 km^{2} (22.57 sq mi)
- Elevation: 47 m (154 ft)

Population (September 2024)
  - Total: 551,228
  - Density: 10,188.92/km^{2} (26,389.2/sq mi)
  - Dialect: Seoul
  - Households: 224,501
- Postal code: 13900 to 14199
- Area code: (+82) 31
- Bird: Eagle
- Flower: Forsythia
- Tree: Ginkgo
- Mascot: Podong-i
- Website: anyang.go.kr

Korean name
- Hangul: 안양시
- Hanja: 安養市
- RR: Anyang-si
- MR: Anyang-si

Anyang (Korean: 안양; Korean pronunciation: [a.njaŋ]) is a city in Gyeonggi Province, South Korea. With a population of approximately 600,000, it is the 20th largest city in South Korea. It is a satellite city of Seoul and located approximately 21 km (13 mi) south of Seoul, and 19 km (12 mi) north of Suwon. It is connected to Seoul via the Seoul Subway Line 1 and Line 4. The City motto of Anyang is "Livable city, Proud citizens". City symbols are a grape mascot named 'Podong-i', Forsythia (flower), Ginkgo (tree), and eagles.

== Geography ==
Anyang is divided into two-halves for administrative purposes: the Manan District to the west and Dongan District to the east. The Manan District is an old and original downtown area centered on Anyang Station. It is dominated by a shopping area with outdoor markets, known as "ilbeonga" (first street). The Dongan District is a new, wealthy suburb of Pyeongchon. The tallest building in Anyang is the Acro Tower, which was completed in April 2007. It is a twin-tower office building in the Dongan District, across the street from Anyang City Hall. Anyang is a convenient transportation center between Seoul and other major cities across the country.

Anyang spans 58.46 square kilometres (22.57 sq mi). Forest and fields constitute 30.15 km^{2} (11.64 sq mi), urban development constitutes 11.51 km^{2} (4.44 sq mi), dry fields constitute 1.8 km^{2} (0.69 sq mi), rice paddies constitutes 1.25 km^{2} (0.48 sq mi), and other land use constitutes 13.76 km^{2} (5.31 sq mi). Anyang is surrounded by mountains on all four sides. These mountains are Gwanak Mountain and Samsung Mountain to the north, Suri Mountain to the southwest, and Cheongye Mountain and Morak Mountain to the other sides. There are eight streams and rivers in Anyang, with a length of 34 kilometres (21 mi).

The main river is Anyang River (one of the four main tributaries of the Han River in Seoul), which is 32.2 km (20.0 mi) long. It has a basin area of 275 km^{2} (106 sq mi), fed by 21 tributaries. The center of the overall elliptical basin topography is low and flat. The river runs through the center of Anyang and is a common place for people to walk, jog, or ride bikes. The river flows through seven cities in Gyeonggi Province. This, however, has caused major issues with pollution. River banks are often covered with parking lots or athletic fields, combined with poor sewerage systems in the upper reaches of the river. As a result, the Anyang Stream Watershed Management Committee for Water Quality Improvement had been established to address some of these issues.

Between 1974 and 1977, Samduck paper and Samyoung hardboard factories poured industrial waste into the Suam and Samseong Rivers (two of the tributaries of Anyang River), causing the rivers to become toxic. This pollution was serious, and local residents dug pools to collect the industrial waste, producing a large, damp paper slab at the base of the pools. Local elder women citizens cut out the paper slabs into blocks that were sold back to Samduck; the remaining residues from the drying process were kept and used as fire fuel by the residents during winter. The "owner of Samduck recently donated his factory ground to the city as a gesture of compensation to the citizens of Anyang". In November 2008, the site reopened as a city park.

=== Climate ===
Anyang has a humid continental climate (Köppen: Dwa), but can be considered a borderline humid subtropical climate (Köppen: Cwa) using the −3 °C (27 °F) isotherm. Anyang has very cold and dry in winter and hot and humid in summer. However, Anyang is cooler than Seoul in summer. The average annual temperature is 12.3 °C, while the average rainfall is 1,344 mm. Around two-thirds of Anyang's rainfall occurs during monsoon season between June and August.

Climate data for Anyang (2004–2020 normals)
Month	Jan	Feb	Mar	Apr	May	Jun	Jul	Aug	Sep	Oct	Nov	Dec	Year
Mean daily maximum °C (°F)	2.3 (36.1)	5.2 (41.4)	10.8 (51.4)	17.3 (63.1)	23.4 (74.1)	27.4 (81.3)	28.8 (83.8)	30.2 (86.4)	25.9 (78.6)	20.1 (68.2)	11.9 (53.4)	4.0 (39.2)	17.3 (63.1)
Daily mean °C (°F)	−1.4 (29.5)	1.1 (34.0)	6.3 (43.3)	12.3 (54.1)	18.4 (65.1)	22.9 (73.2)	25.4 (77.7)	26.4 (79.5)	21.8 (71.2)	15.5 (59.9)	8.0 (46.4)	0.4 (32.7)	13.1 (55.6)
Mean daily minimum °C (°F)	−4.8 (23.4)	−2.5 (27.5)	2.4 (36.3)	8.1 (46.6)	13.9 (57.0)	19.0 (66.2)	22.5 (72.5)	23.5 (74.3)	18.2 (64.8)	11.5 (52.7)	4.2 (39.6)	−3.1 (26.4)	9.4 (48.9)
Average precipitation mm (inches)	12.6 (0.50)	27.1 (1.07)	36.5 (1.44)	69.1 (2.72)	92.7 (3.65)	114.1 (4.49)	409.9 (16.14)	257.3 (10.13)	144.5 (5.69)	50.7 (2.00)	58.3 (2.30)	22.1 (0.87)	1,294.9 (50.98)
Average precipitation days (≥ 0.1 mm)	3.2	3.5	5.4	7.5	7.4	8.1	14.3	12.1	8.2	4.6	7.0	5.5	86.8
Source: Korea Meteorological Administration

== History ==
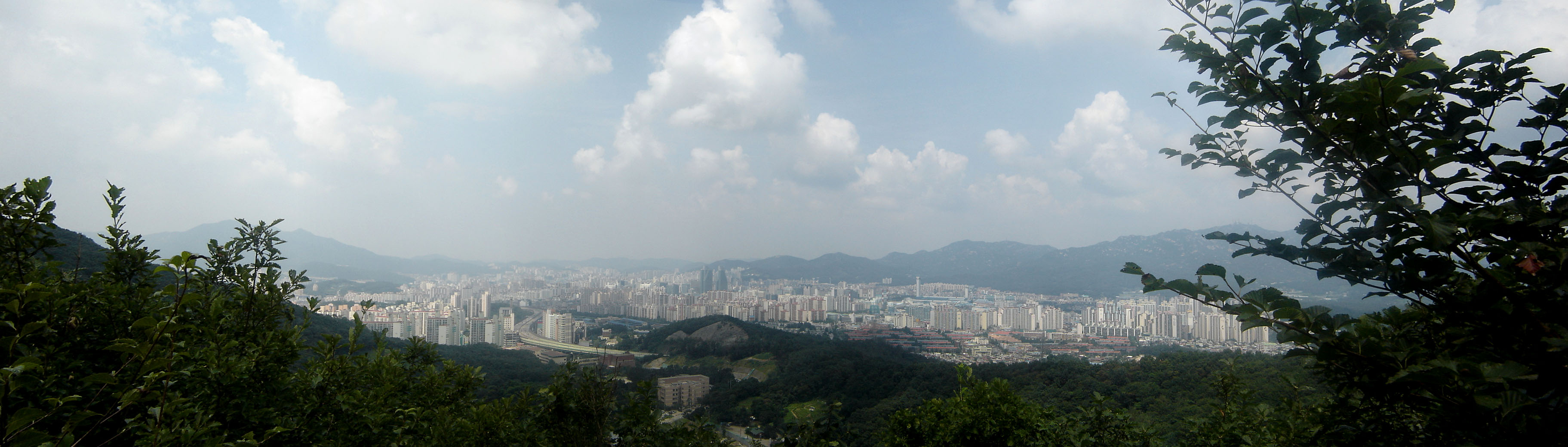
Anyang panorama, 2006.

The name Anyang originates from Anyang mall which was established by Wang Geon, the first king of Goryeo. In the fourth year of Hyōgong, king of Silla (900), Wang Geon, a general of Gung Ye, was passing through Samsung Mountain to quell the rebellion in the Gumju (Siheung) and Gwaju (Gwacheon) areas. During their travels, the troops met an old Buddhist priest named Neungjung, and while listening to the priest, Wang Geon had the idea of building a temple at the location. Anyang itself is a Buddhist term signifying a heavenly land where unimaginable joy and freedom overflow.

As with most towns and cities in South Korea, Anyang has experienced tremendous urban growth during the past few decades. Anyang was severely battered by warfare during the Korean War. Ten years after it ended, the area's population was still largely rural and its landscape agricultural. It was well known for its grape growing. Anyang was given city status in 1973 and has grown to become the 15th most populated city in the country. It is also becoming a commuter city for many workers in Seoul because of its close proximity.

=== Modern history ===
- 1963: A ferry sank near Seoul drowning 37 children and 12 adults, the majority of whom were school children from Anyang who were returning from a picnic.
- 1964: Three people were killed and 100 injured in an explosion of artillery duds in an Anyang workshop.
- 1973: Anyang is granted city status.
- 1977: A flood devastates the Seoul region killing 335, including 148 in Anyang and adjacent areas. Anyang Technical College opens.
- 1988: On March 25, 22 female workers died after a fire broke out at the Green Hill Textile Company.
- 1991: Police forced their way into Anyang Prison Hospital to retrieve the body of Labour Leader Park Chang-soo who they believed had committed suicide by leaping from a window. It took nine hours to get past the 1,500 protesters who were protecting the body in the belief that he had been murdered and that the police were trying to conduct a cover-up.
- 1995: Former South Korean president Chun Doo-hwan was placed in Anyang Prison as he was to be indicted on charges stemming from a 1979 mutiny.
- 1997: Chun Doo-hwan is freed from Anyang Prison.
- 2001: Anyang officials tell Komachi Japan they will not accept seventeen Komachi exchange students due to distorted content of Japanese text books on the Korean War.
- 2007: In September, 23 Korean hostages, held captive by Taliban insurgents in Afghanistan, are freed and upon their arrival are taken to Sam Anyang Hospital. Hye-jin Lee, 11, and her friend Ye-seul Woo, 8, went missing on Christmas Day in Anyang. Lee's body was found on a mountain in Suwon 77 days after the children went missing.
- 2013: The 12th Anyang Citizens Festival was held in Pyeongchon Central Park. This festival celebrated Anyang's 40th anniversary as a city.

== Demographics ==
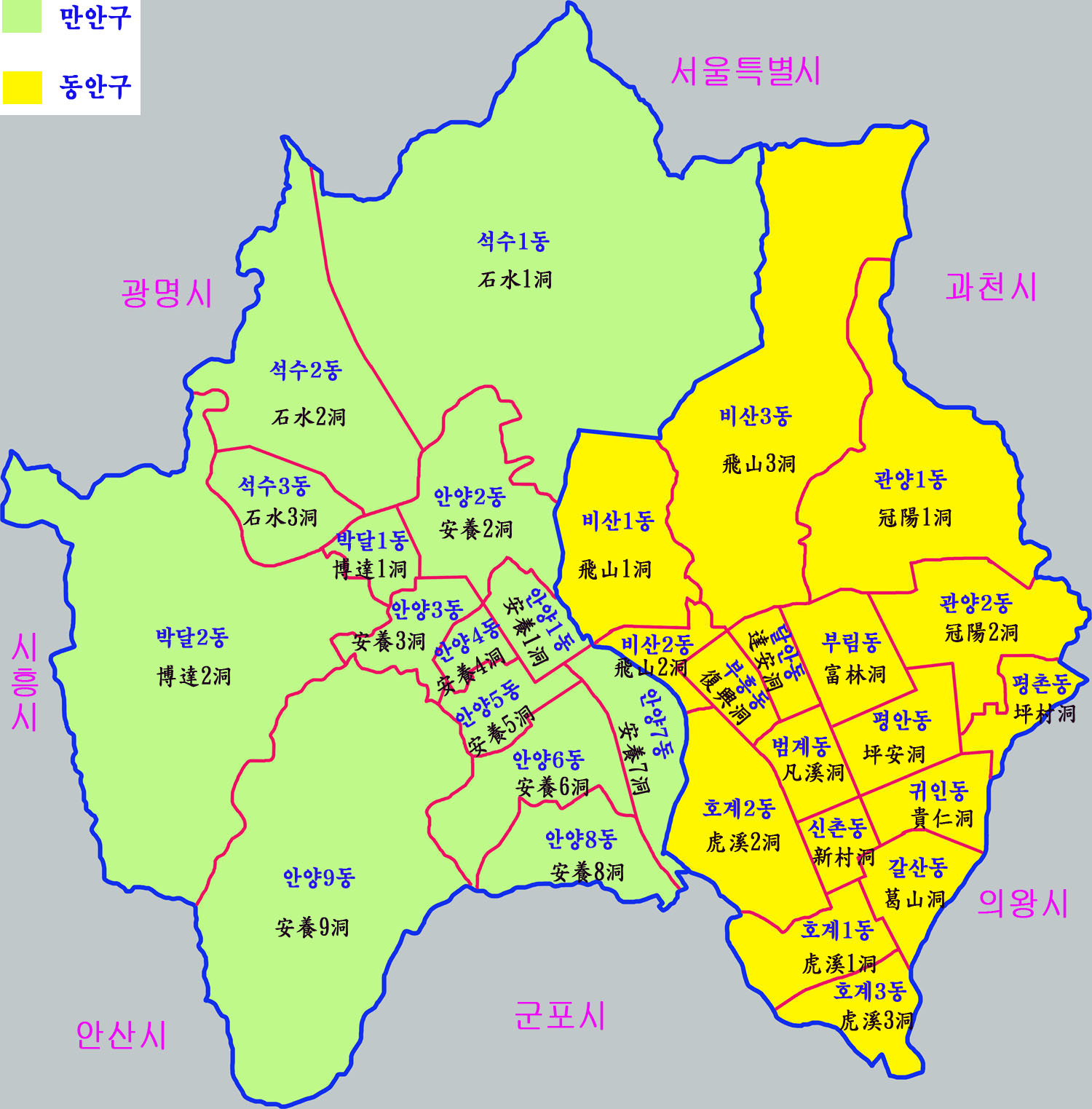
Map of Anyang districts and dong. Green is Manan District and Yellow is Dongan District.

Like most cities in South Korea, the population is made up almost entirely of ethnic Koreans. In 2007, there were 624,197 South Koreans resident in Anyang (311,702 males and 312,495 females), and 6,491 non-South Koreans (3,148 males and 3,343 females). Non-South Koreans were Chinese (4,706), Vietnamese (315), Americans (283), Filipinos (168), Japanese (147), British (21), and others including Israelis (771).

=== Administration ===
Administrative divisions Anyang has 2 administrative wards:

- Manan District (made up of three areas) - households: 100,900
- Dongan District (made up of four areas) - households: 125,600

=== Subdivisions ===
The city is divided into 31 further subsidiary districts ('dong') subdivisions of cities and counties in South Korea.

#	Place	Population (2007)	House hold	Businesses	Area (km^{2})	#	Place	Population	House hold	Businesses	Area (km^{2})
1	Seoksu-1-dong	18,767	6,827	612	9.22	17	Bisan-1-dong	28,237	9,410	681	1.81
2	Seoksu-2-dong	29,620	12,325	1,950	3.43	18	Bisan-2-dong	20,042	4,048	618	0.46
3	Seoksu-3-dong	11,140	4,283	493	0.7	19	Bisan-3-dong	27,018	9,863	1,074	5.56
4	Bakdal-1-dong	17,939	7,516	1,174	0.93	20	Dalan-dong	13,708	5,859	670	0.44
5	Bakdal-2-dong	23,815	7,572	627	6.9	21	Burim-dong	27,916	10,406	1,541	0.86
6	Anyang-1-dong	18,864	6,517	2,543	0.67	22	Buheung-dong	20,042	6,825	812	0.5
7	Anyang-2-dong	25,219	10,407	1,765	2.85	23	Pyeongan-dong	27,804	8,971	474	0.64
8	Anyang-3-dong	19,923	7,858	1,055	1.02	24	Pyeongchon-dong	16,823	5,432	963	0.82
9	Anyang-4-dong	7,235	2,997	1,653	0.31	25	Gwiin-dong	18,615	5,432	1,151	0.64
10	Anyang-5-dong	15,388	6,307	979	0.5	26	Gwanyang-1-dong	28,943	10,808	1,933	3.19
11	Anyang-6-dong	19,593	8,404	1,768	1.47	27	Gwanyang-2-dong	17,478	7,297	2,105	1.79
12	Anyang-7-dong	16,941	6,475	1,824	1.04	28	Sinchon-dong	15,242	4,746	678	0.66
13	Anyang-8-dong	13,307	5,434	821	1.09	29	Hogye-1-dong	18,287	7,450	3,176	1.03
14	Anyang-9-dong	19,661	7,204	575	6.42	30	Hogye-2-dong	29,031	10,069	1,419	1.43
15	Galsan-dong	12,415	4,102	385	0.7	31	Hogye-3-dong	25,540	8,570	968	0.75
16	Beomgye-dong	17,574	5,965	1,951	0.64						

*Figures based on resident registration figures made available by local government offices.

=== City plans ===
In early 2010, previous Anyang mayor, Phil-woon Lee announced plans to build a 100-storey city hall. It was thought that it could house a hotel, cinemas, shopping complexes and other facilities. However, the plans garnered negative responses from both central government and local residents, as several other local governments recently built new city hall at great tax payer expense.

Other recent major redevelopment plans have taken down several buildings in Anyang, particularly the Manan Gu area's run down apartment buildings on highly valued land within walking distance of Anyang Station.

=== Jobs and industry ===
Many workers from Seoul are residents in Anyang, commuting daily between Anyang and Seoul. There are 1,194 companies based in Anyang.

An area encompassing a 3 km section from Myunghak Station to Indeogwon Station to Kwanak-ro was appointed as 'Anyang Venture Valley' in November 2001 as a part of an effort to support venture companies. There are currently 6,300 people working in 238 company and venture company facilities including Anyang K-Center and Manan Venture Center, Pyongchon IT Venture Center, Kumkang Venturetel and Delta Venture Center.

== Arts ==
Anyang City Hall has a project named 'Anyang Art City 21 Project' which aims to create "a beautiful city, an art city and a well-being city by adding virtuosity to the exterior of city buildings and harmonizing the city sight with natural environment".

Anyang also has the country's only Singing Road, which is made from grooves cut into the ground, which driven over causes a tactile vibration and audible rumbling transmitted through the wheels into the car body. Drivers can hear the tune of "Mary Had a Little Lamb", and the road is intended to help motorists stay alert and awake.

=== Notable people ===
- Han Hee-jun (singer)
- Ji Chang-wook (actor)
- Jin (singer, member of BTS)
- Kim Min-gyu (singer, member of Seventeen)
- Kim Yeon-ji (singer)
- Park Jeong-hwa (singer, member of EXID)
- Ryu Deok-hwan (actor)
- Chae Soo-bin (stage/TV/film actress)
- Yang Se-jong (actor)
- Woo Do-hwan (actor)
- Kim Jong-kook (singer, entertainer, actor)
- Kim Hong-joong (rapper, member of Ateez)
- Niel (singer, member of Teen Top)

=== Media ===
Anyang has 17 weekly newspaper publishers, one television program provider and one general broadcaster. The city also has 23 book publishers. South Korea's largest motion-picture studio is located in Anyang. In 2011 a film about Anyang won the Korean Feature Competition, at the Jeonju Intl. Film Festival. Titled "Anyang, Paradise City" and directed by Chan-Kyung Park, it is a story portraying the past and present of Anyang City "with a mix of documentary and fiction".

== Education ==
As of 2007 Anyang has 84 kindergartens (6,685 students), 40 elementary schools (48,639), 24 middle schools (29,084), 22 high schools (31,259), two junior colleges (17,638), three universities (13,634) and one school for the disabled (244). The universities include Anyang University, Sungkyul University, and Gyeongin Education University, while the colleges are Daelim College and Anyang Technical College. Gyeongin National University of Education is also nearby in the mountains.

In addition there were 1,026 private educational institutions listed in 2008 with 97,289 students in attendance. These are predominantly after school academies where students go to get additional study or complete homework in a variety of subject areas such as English or Maths. The main area for these institutes is 'academy street', known locally as 'hagwon ga', which is located a few kilometres directly to the south of Anyang Central Park in Dongan Gu.

Anyang has eight public libraries (Pyeongchon library, Suksoo library, Kwanak library, Bakdal library, Manan library, Hogye library, Bisan library, Children library, and Gwanyang library). Many people use it, and due to its different 'Closed days', people use it variously. Bisan library and Gwanyang library was built up recently; Bisan in 2010, Gwanyang in 2016.

== Sports ==
Anyang is home to the HL Anyang ice hockey team which play in the Asia League Ice Hockey. They won their first Asian hockey league title in 2010 and were the first South Korean team to do so. Anyang is also home to the Anyang Jung Kwan Jang Red Boosters basketball team, playing in the Korean Basketball League. They won the league for the first time in 2012. Anyang founded its own professional football team in 2013, FC Anyang, who plays in the K League 1, the top tier of South Korean football. The team replaced FC Seoul who were based in Anyang and were known as the Anyang LG Cheetahs before being relocated to Seoul in 2004 for commercial reasons. FC Anyang are a citizen team, funded by the city council along with sponsorship money from principal sponsor, Kookmin Bank. They play at the Anyang Stadium complex.

Sporting facilities in Anyang include the Anyang sporting complex (which features a stadium for athletics and football, an indoor ice rink, a basketball stadium, and an open air and indoor swimming pool). The main stadium was built in 1986 and seats 18,216 people. Anyang also has an inline roller skating stadium which hosted the 2006 World Roller Speed Skating Championships, and an inline skate rink in Pyeongchon at Anyang Central Park. There are also numerous council-run outdoor basketball courts and football fields in the city of Anyang, along with those on school land.

=== Notable people ===
- An Ba-ul (judoka)
- Cha Min-kyu (speed skater)
- Hwang Dae-heon (short track speed skater)
- Kim Ha-nul (figure skater)
- Kim Kuk-young (track & field sprinter)
- Kim Min-seok (speed skater)
- Oh In-pyo (footballer)

== Attractions and tourism ==
There are many museums, parks and ancient remains in Anyang, although due to its location and relatively low profile Anyang does not attract many international tourists. The majority of visitors to Anyang's attractions are either domestic travelers or local residents. The main hotels in Anyang are Samwon Plaza Tourist Hotel, Sogno Hotel, Koam Tourist Hotel, the Anyang Blue Monte Resort & Youth Hostel all located in Manan Gu, and Central Tourist Hotel in Dongan District.

The Anyang History Museum is located in Galsan-dong, Dongan District, with the major theme of the museum being the displaying of the history and culture of the Anyang area. A site featuring the banner poles from a Joongcho temple is located in Manan Gu. They are the only banner poles in Korea from the period 827AD, and are so unique that they are designated national treasure no. 4. Anyang also hosts the collected writings of Toegye Lee Hwang (1501–1570), which were written to teach his follower Kwon Ho-Mun how to write (national treasure no. 548). Anyang also possesses dozens of nationally recognised 'tangible assets' including Manan Bridge, and the Maaejong rock engraving of a bell from the end of the Silla period. In addition, Anyang contains the tombstone of Park Suh, a civil servant in the middle Joseon period, as well as dolmens in Pyeongchon, a stone chambered grave in Bisan dong, and a letter engraved in stone by Ji Woon Yong at Sammak Temple.

=== City festival ===
Anyang hosts four festivals to coincide with the four seasons. The Spring festival begins at the end of May and is focussed around Anyang River. It is made up of a series of performances and "ecological experiences" alongside the river. The Summer festival takes place at the end of August at Pyeongchon Central Park and Byeongmokan Citizen Park. It involves a festival of wind instruments with contests, invitation performances and a parade. The Fall festival is at the beginning of October and takes place at Pyeongchon Central Park. It is a celebration of life in Anyang with a citizens festival featuring plays, food and markets. The Winter festival occurs from December to February and is focused around the indoor skating rink at the Anyang sports complex. The main features are ice hockey, short track ice skating and figure skating exhibitions.

=== City life ===
Anyang has 15 traditional markets and 4 shopping districts which include 3 department stores and 9 other large scale stores. Lotte Mart and Lotte Cinema are located next to Anyang Station. Anyang First Street is across the road from Anyang Station, and is the location of a number of restaurants, shopping, and nightlife venues.

There are four movie theaters in Anyang and thirty nine movie theater screens. The CJ CGV theater is located near Anyang Station and Pyeongchon Station, DMC theater is located in New Core Outlet, and Cinus theater is located near Indeogwan. Other theaters is named Kinex 10.

There are 7,617 listed restaurants in the Anyang area, along with 62 bath houses, 278 barbers, and 1,026 beauty shops.

Anyang's nightlife is not comparable to Seoul. People are more inclined to focusing on mountain views and river environments.

=== Parks ===
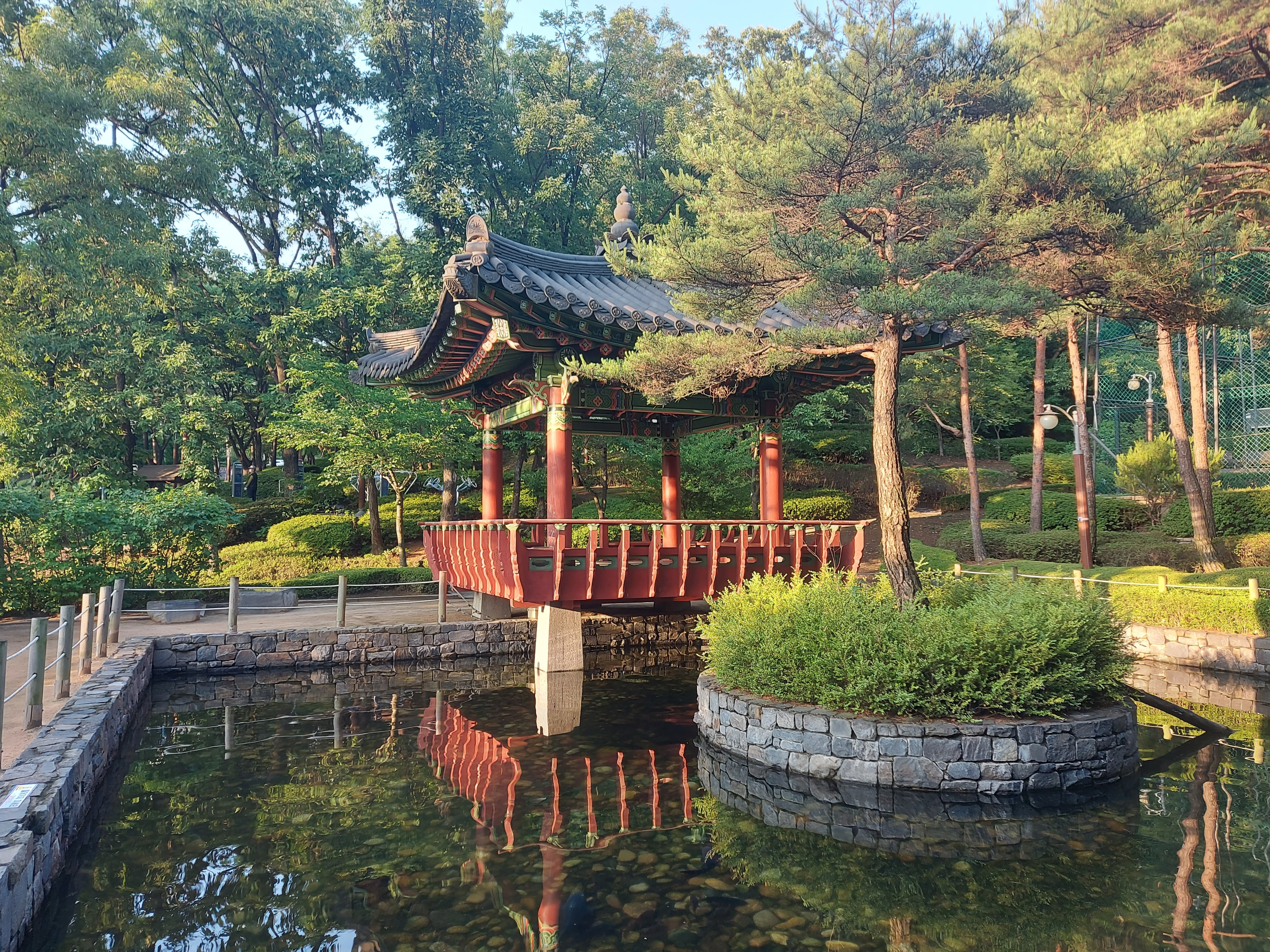
Chunghun Park

As of 2007 there were 97 listed parks in Anyang covering an area of 1,347 square metres.

The main parks in Anyang are Anyang Art Park, Anyang Central Park, Jayu Park (Freedom Park) which is south of Hagwon-ga and contains tennis courts and statues of important figures in the Korean independence movement, the Pyeongchon Art Hall, the Children's Traffic Park, Hakwoon Park, Hogye Park, Byongmokan Civic Park, Seoksu Sports Park, Chunghun Park, and the Changbakgol water reservoir sports park. Anyang Central Park is situated between Pyeonchon Station and Beomgye Station, and contains a series of fountains that flow around the centre of the park with modern art sculptures alongside as part of the Anyang Art Project. It also contains an outdoor stage which holds aerobic classes, tennis courts, a playground, a croquet lawn and various other areas for sport. During the weekend the street dividing the park is closed for a flea market.

== Crime ==
In 2007 there were 16,311 reported cases of crime in Anyang. There were 13,771 arrests made during the same year. In 2008, there were 20,854 crimes. The following year, there were 16,990 crimes. However, the recent installation of new CCTV has led to the crime rate decreasing.

== Pollution ==
In 2013, Anyang (along with Busan) was listed as one of the most polluted cities (in terms of air pollution) in the world's largest economies, with nearly 70 micrograms of particulate matter of less than 10 micron size per cubic meter.

From 2016 to now, the construction of GS cogeneration system lead to many conflicts between GS and the residents living near Pyeongchon-Dong. Many people believe that the power plant increases air pollution, which is already a heavy issue in Korea.

== Facilities ==
=== Housing ===
A huge redevelopment is proposed for the Manan Gu area, beginning in late 2010, with the focus on urban renewal. The proposal would see the building of approximately 24,000 apartment units built over an area of 1,776,000 m^{2} and see the destruction and redevelopment of the area around Anyang Station. The Graduate School of Architecture, Planning and Preservation at Columbia University, in conjunction with the Anyang Public Art Project 2010, has had its students working on concept plans and designs for the redevelopment of the Hogye Apartments in Dongan Gu.

=== Hospitals ===
Anyang has many medical facilities, including four general hospitals (Metro Hospital, Sam Anyang Hospital, Hallym University Sacred Heart Hospital and Hansung Hospital), five hospitals, 331 clinics, 191 dental clinics, 141 oriental medical hospitals, two health centres and two long-term care hospitals.

== Transportation ==
Anyang is well served by bus, subway and rail services. The intercity bus terminal is located directly opposite Anyang Station which was first opened in January 1905. It was rebuilt into a large, modern building, which reopened in December 2001 and is adjacent to Lotte Department Store. It takes approximately 40 minutes on line one from Anyang to Seoul Station. There are six other stations in Anyang: Myeonghak, Gwanak and Seoksu, and Beomgye, Pyeongchon and Indeogwon, the first three on line one and the latter three on line four.

=== Railroad ===
- Korail

- Seoul Subway Line 1

Seoksu — Gwanak — Anyang — Myeonghak

- Seoul Subway Line 4

Indeogwon — Pyeongchon — Beomgye

- Gyeongbu Line

(Yongsan) ← Anyang Station → (Suwon) → (Pyeongtaek) → (Chungcheongnam-do) → (Sejong Special Administrative City) → (Daejeon Metropolitan City) → (Chungcheongbuk-do) → (Gyeongsangbuk-do) → (Daegu Metropolitan City) → (Gyeongsangbuk-do) → (Gyeongsangnam-do) → (Busan)

- Honam Line

(Seoul) ← Anyang Station → (Suwon) → (Osan) → (Pyeongtaek) → (Chungcheongnam-do) → (Sejong Special Administrative City) → (Daejeon Metropolitan City) → (Chungcheongnam-do) → (Jeollanbuk-do) → (Jeollannam-do)

While technically not in Anyang itself, the Gwangmyeong Station is located less than 10 minutes drive to the northwest of Anyang Station and essentially exists to service Anyang and other nearby cities. Thus, when using KTX, Gwangmyeong Station or Suwon Station is useful.

=== Road and automobiles ===
In 2007 there were 188,423 vehicles registered in Anyang. During the same year there were 1,351 recorded automobile accidents resulting in 32 deaths, and 2,150 injuries. There were also 59,185 traffic offences recorded in 2007, the majority of which were committed by passenger vehicles (39,773).

== Sister cities ==
Domestic relations

City	Province
Yeongwol	Gangwon State
Goesan	North Chungcheong Province
Yesan	South Chungcheong Province
Jangsu	North Jeolla Province
Hampyeong	South Jeolla Province
Ulleung	North Gyeongsang Province
Hadong	South Gyeongsang Province

International relations

City	State	Country	Year
Komaki	Aichi Prefecture	Japan	1986
Hampton	Virginia	United States	1989
Garden Grove	California	United States	1989
Weifang	Shandong	China	1995
Ulan-Ude	Buryatia	Russia	1997
Naucalpan	State of Mexico	Mexico	1997
Tokorozawa	Saitama Prefecture	Japan	1998
Sorocaba	São Paulo	Brazil	1998

== See also ==
- Anyang Halla
- Anyang Station
- Beomgye Station
- Geography of South Korea
- List of cities in South Korea
- Seoul National Capital Area
