= Shim Jae-chul =

South Korean politician (born 1958)

- 심재철
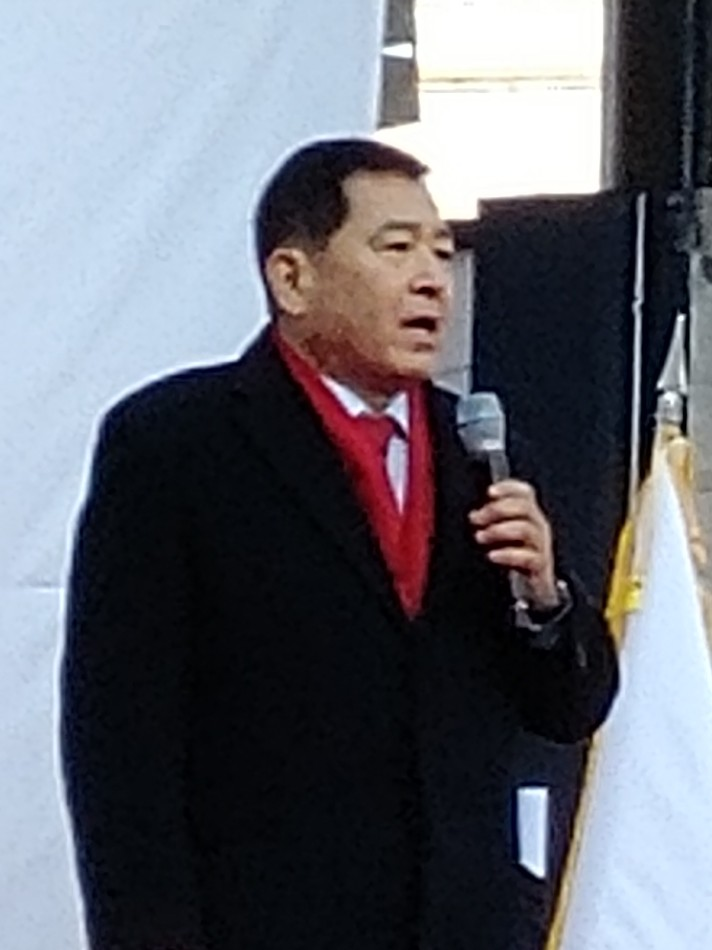
- Shim in 2019

Acting Leader of the United Future Party
- In office 16 April 2020 – 8 May 2020
- Preceded by: Hwang Kyo-ahn
- Succeeded by: Joo Ho-young (acting)

Floor Leader of the United Future Party
- In office 18 February 2020 – 8 May 2020
- Preceded by: Office established
- Succeeded by: Joo Ho-young

Floor Leader of the Liberty Korea Party
- In office 9 December 2019 – 18 February 2020
- Preceded by: Na Kyung-won

Member of the National Assembly
- In office 30 May 2000 – 29 May 2020
- Preceded by: Lee Seok-hyun
- Succeeded by: Lee Jae-jung
- Constituency: Anyang Dongan (Gyeonggi, 2000-2004); Anyang Dongan B (Gyeonggi, 2004-2020)

Personal details
- Born: 18 January 1958 (age 68) Gwangju, South Jeolla Province, South Korea
- Party: People Power (2020–present)
- Other political affiliations: United Future Party (2020); Liberty Korea Party (2017–2020); Saenuri Party (2012–2017); Grand National Party (1997–2012); New Korea Party (1995–1997)
- Children: 1
- Education: Catholic University of Korea

Korean name
- Hangul: 심재철
- Hanja: 沈在哲
- RR: Sim Jaecheol
- MR: Sim Chaech'ŏl

Shim Jae-chul (Korean: 심재철; born 18 January 1958) is a South Korean journalist and politician who served as a member of the National Assembly from 2000 to 2020.

== Early life and career ==
He was born in Gwangju. He became an activist during Gwangju Uprising in 1980. He graduated Seoul University department of English education. He later worked as a journalist of MBC in the late 1980s and early 1990s. He joined the New Korea Party following the recommendation from the ex-president Kim Young-sam, in 1996.

Shim was elected as the representative of Dongan-gu for the 16th National Assembly of the Republic of Korea in 2000. He has been reelected four times.

In 2016, he was elected as the First Deputy Speaker of the Parliament. He supported the impeachment of president Park Geun-hye.

In 2019, he was elected as the Floor Leader of the Liberty Korea Party, succeeding Na Kyung-won. Following the merger of the Liberty Korea Party with the New Conservative Party and Onward for Future 4.0, he retained his position.

== Controversy ==
=== Human rights violation ===
He was convicted of human rights violations during the early 1980s. He was an activist against Chun Doo-hwan, but he attempted to disorganize the protest. This decision led to a massacre.

After that, he tortured "activists for democracy". Rhyu Si-min was one of these victims.

=== Inappropriate behavior ===
In 2013, he was caught looking at a nude photo on his phone.

He sent a Kakao Talk message that insulted the bereaved of Sewol sinking.

=== Rebellion ===
On 28 November 2017, he declared that he would report president Moon Jae-in along with his secretaries as "rebellion".

== Election results ==
Year	Elections	Constituency	Political party	Votes (%)	Results
1996	15th National Assembly General Election	Anyang Dongan A (Gyeonggi)	NKP	18,222 (24.70%)	Defeated (2nd)
2000	16th National Assembly General Election	Anyang Dongan (Gyeonggi)	GNP	62,108 (49.12%)	Won
2004	17th National Assembly General Election	Anyang Dongan B (Gyeonggi)	GNP	41,838 (50.99%)	Won
2008	18th National Assembly General Election	Anyang Dongan B (Gyeonggi)	GNP	39,453 (61.23%)	Won
2012	19th National Assembly General Election	Anyang Dongan B (Gyeonggi)	Saenuri	42,405 (51.68%)	Won
2016	20th National Assembly General Election	Anyang Dongan B (Gyeonggi)	Saenuri	36,148 (41.46%)	Won
2020	21st National Assembly General Election	Anyang Dongan B (Gyeonggi)	UFP	38,327 (41.73%)	Defeated (2nd)
2024	22nd National Assembly General Election	Anyang Dongan B (Gyeonggi)	PPP	44,751 (46.13%)	Defeated (2nd)
