= Myeonghak station =

Train station in South Korea

Coordinates: 37°23′06″N 126°56′08″E

명학 (성결대); Myeonghak (Sungkyul Univ.)
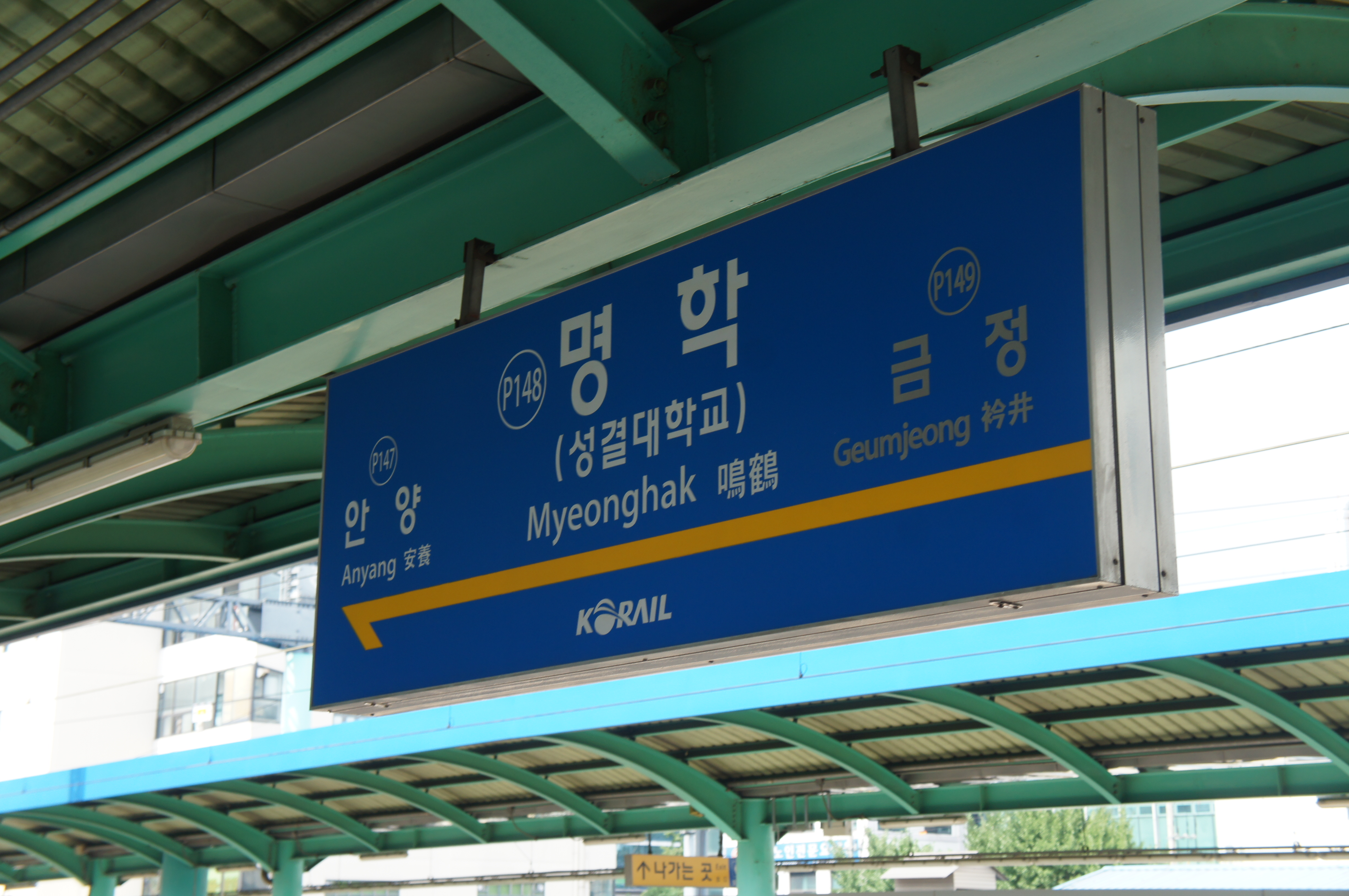

Korean name
- Hangul: 명학역
- Hanja: 鳴鶴驛
- RR: Myeonghak-yeok
- MR: Myŏnghak-yŏk

General information
- Location: 1163-1 Anyang 7-dong, 20 Mananno, Manan-gu, Anyang-si, Gyeonggi Province
- Operator: Korail
- Line: Line 1
- Platforms: 2
- Tracks: 4

Construction
- Structure type: Aboveground

Key dates
- August 15, 1974: Line 1 opened

Passengers
- (Daily) Based on Jan-Dec of 2012. Line 1: 21,541
Location

Myeonghak Station (Korean: 명학역) is a train station on Line 1 of the Seoul Subway. It is located in the city of Anyang in Gyeonggi Province.

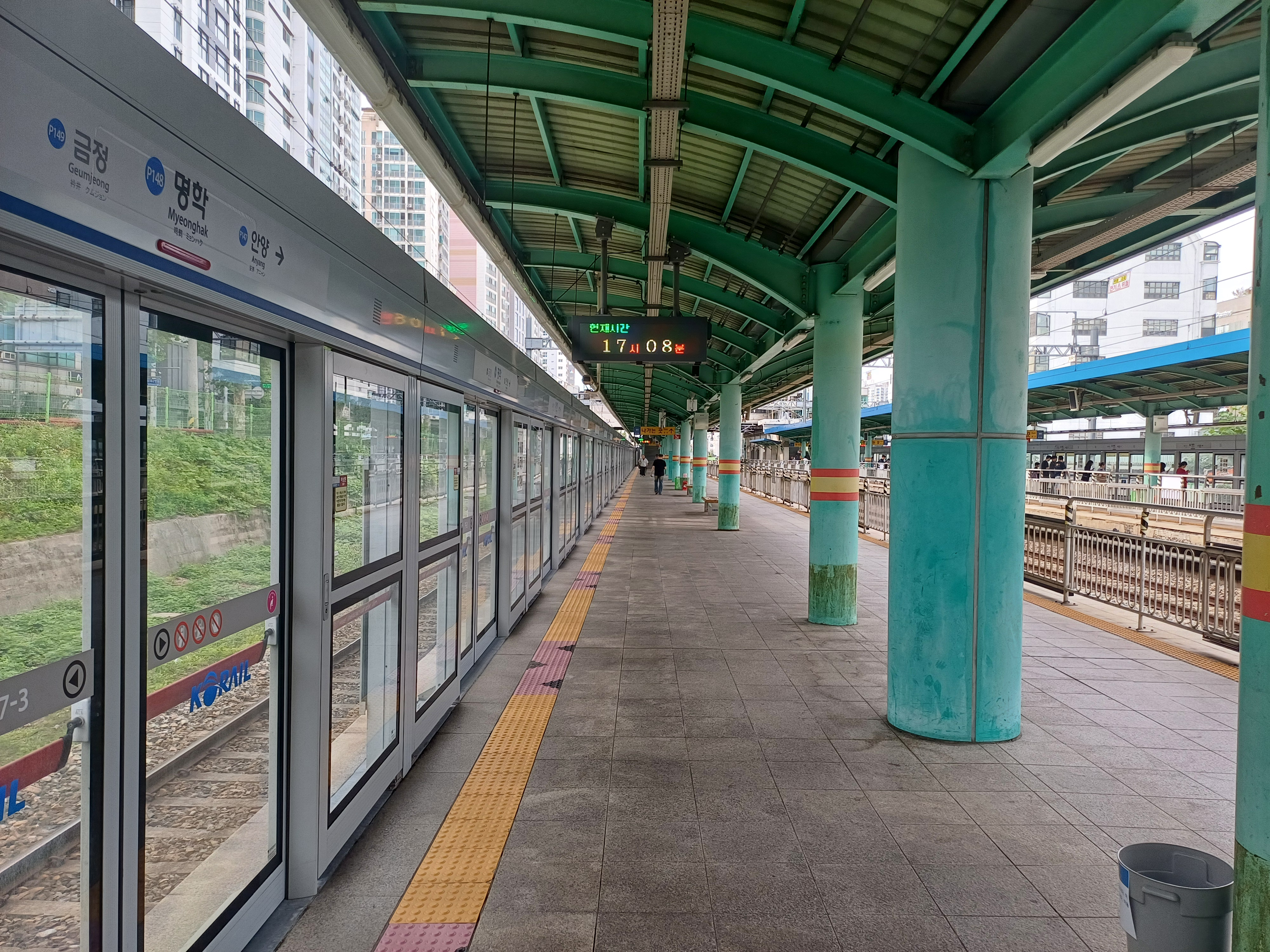
Platform

== Vicinity ==
- Exit 1 : Myeonghak Elementary
- Exit 2 : DongA apartment

Preceding station	Seoul Metropolitan Subway	Following station
Anyang towards Kwangwoon University	Line 1	Geumjeong towards Seodongtan or Sinchang
