= Seoksu-dong =

Neighborhood in Anyang, South Korea

- Hangul: 석수동
- Hanja: 石水洞
- RR: Seoksu-dong
- MR: Sŏksu-dong

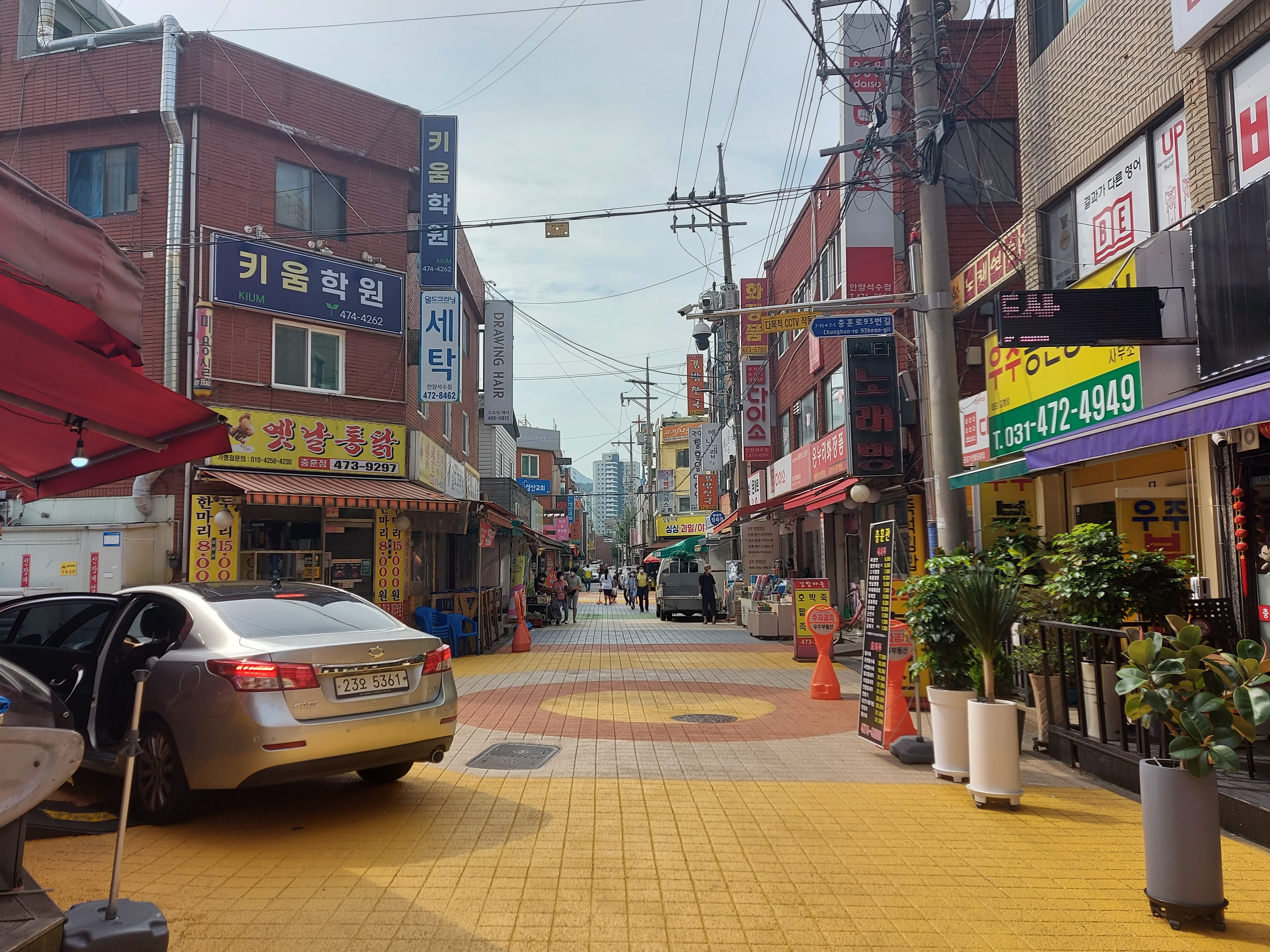
The market in Seoksu-3-dong, Anyang

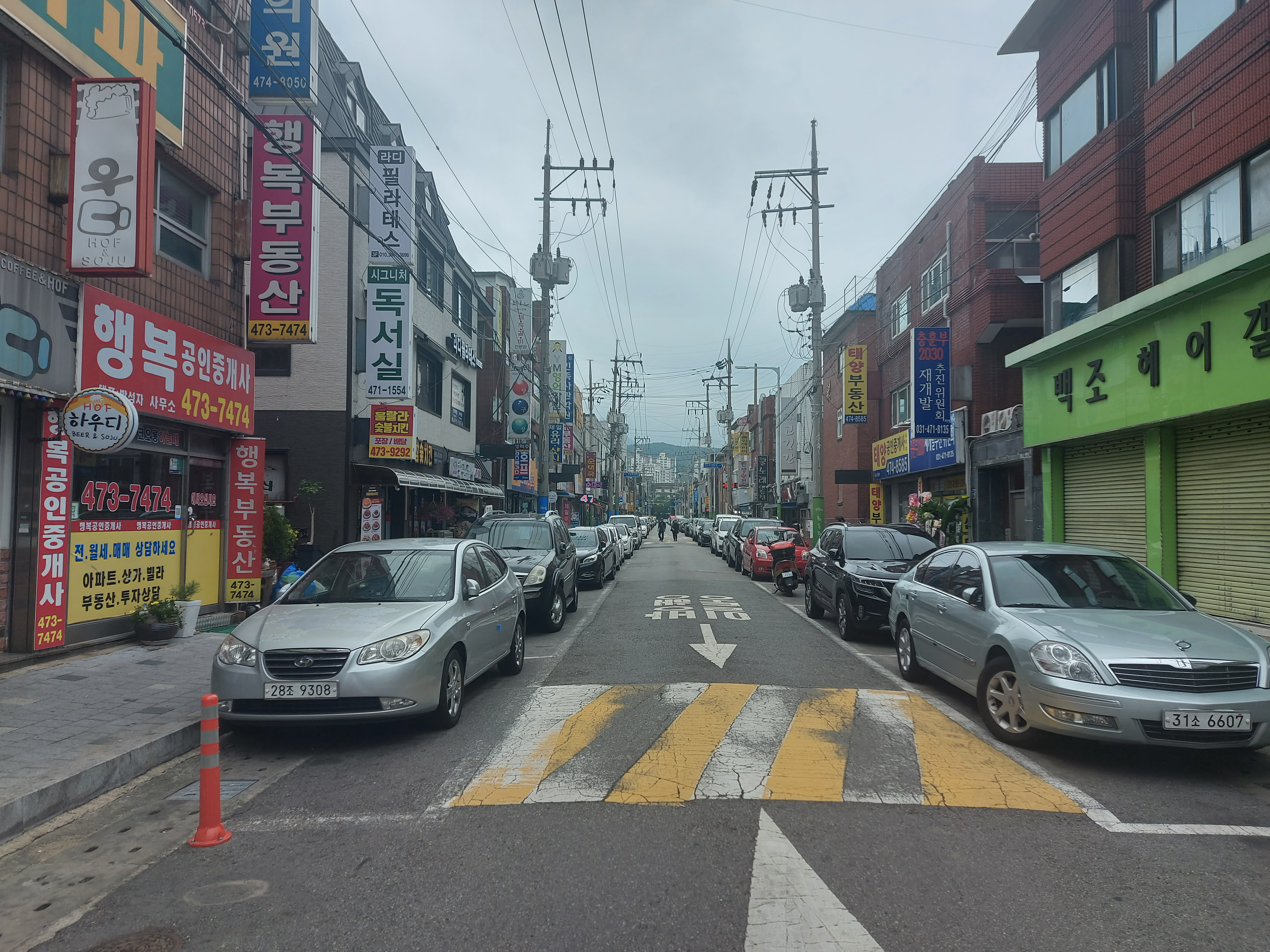
A street in Seoksu-3-dong, Anyang

Seoksu-dong (Korean: 석수동) is a neighborhood of Manan district in the city of Anyang, Gyeonggi Province, South Korea. It is officially divided into Seoksu-1-dong, Seoksu-2-dong, and Seoksu-3-dong.
