= Gwanyang-dong =

- Hangul: 관양동
- Hanja: 冠陽洞
- RR: Gwanyang-dong
- MR: Kwanyang-dong

Gwanyang-dong (Korean: 관양동) is a neighborhood of Dongan District, Anyang, Gyeonggi Province, South Korea. It is officially divided into Gwanyang-1-dong and Gwanyang-2-dong.
