= Bisan-dong, Anyang =

Neighborhood of Anyang, South Korea

Coordinates: 37°24′N 126°57′E

- Hangul: 비산동
- Hanja: 飛山洞
- RR: Bisan-dong
- MR: Pisan-dong

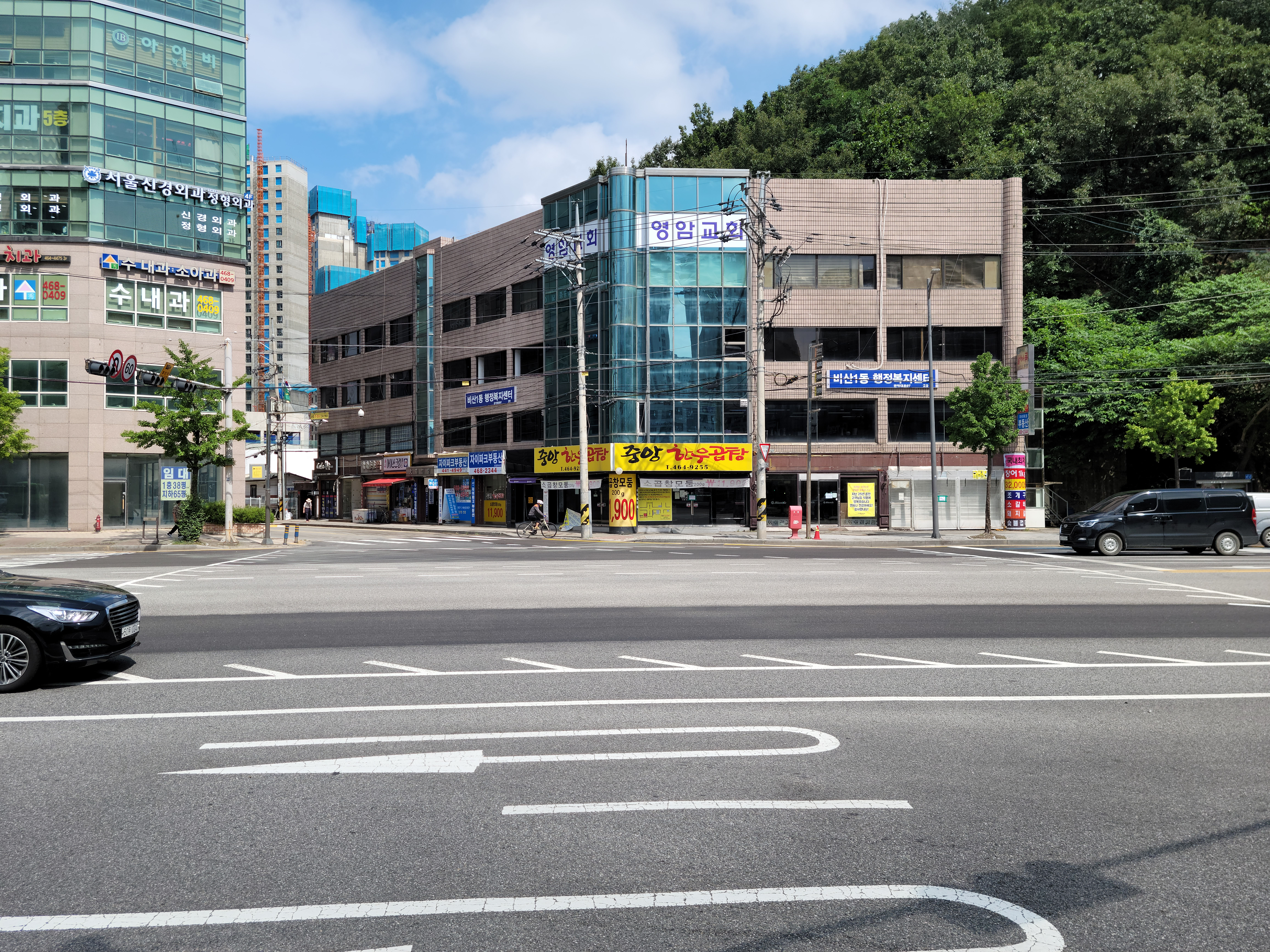
Daejin Building in Bisan-dong, Dongan District, Anyang

Bisan-dong (Korean: 비산동) is a neighborhood of Dongan District, Anyang, Gyeonggi Province, South Korea. It is officially divided into Bisan-1-dong, Bisan-2-dong and Bisan-3-dong.

It is placed in the north, middle side of Anyang-si, and it is right below the Gwanak Mountain, or Gwanaksan.
