= Hogye-dong, Anyang =

Neighborhood of Dongan district, South Korea

Coordinates: 38°13′N 127°43′E

- Hangul: 호계동
- Hanja: 虎溪洞
- RR: Hogye-dong
- MR: Hogye-dong

Hogye-dong (Korean: 호계동) is a neighborhood of Dongan District, Anyang, Gyeonggi Province, South Korea. It is officially divided into Hogye-1-dong, Hogye-2-dong and Hogye-3-dong.
