= Pyeongchon-dong, Anyang =

Coordinates: 37°23′N 126°59′E

- Hangul: 평촌동
- Hanja: 坪村洞
- RR: Pyeongchon-dong
- MR: P'yŏngch'on-dong

Pyeongchon-dong (Korean: 평촌동) is a neighborhood of Dongan district in the city of Anyang, Gyeonggi Province, South Korea.
