= Pyeongchon Central Park =

Park in Anyang, South Korea

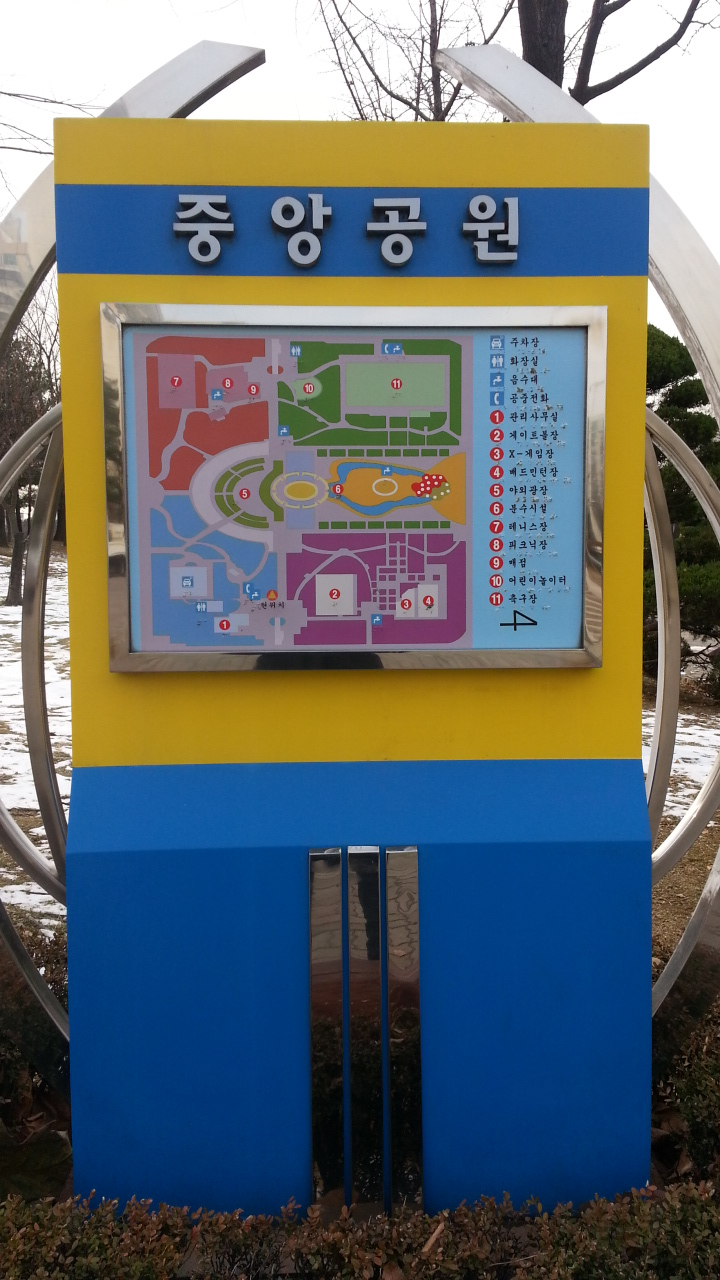
- Interactive map of Pyeongchon Central Park
- Location: Dongan-gu, Anyang, Gyeonggi Province, South Korea
- Coordinates: 37.3896°N 126.9593°E

Korean name
- Hangul: 평촌중앙공원
- Hanja: 平村中央公園
- RR: Pyeongchon jungang gongwon
- MR: P'yŏngch'on chungang kongwŏn

Pyeongchon Central Park (Korean: 평촌중앙공원) is a public park in Dongan-gu, Anyang, Gyeonggi Province, South Korea. Pyeongchon Central Park was opened on 31 December 1993 with a total space of approximately 119,843 square metres (1,289,980 sq ft).

Pyeongchon Central Park is located next to the Acro Towers and Hagwon-ga to the south, with Anyang City Hall one block directly north. The park's main feature is a complex fountain system connected by artificial streambeds.

The park includes tennis courts, a soccer field, basketball courts, badminton courts, gateball court (croquet lawn), in-line skate park, a performance stage, concession stand, and an X-game court, where skaters can practice stunts. There are also quite a few statues and fountains. A free large community aerobics class takes place regularly in the evenings at center of the park, where free concerts are sometimes held.

The street on the park's north side is closed off to traffic on weekends, and used for flea markets and as a course for kids to drive tiny cars and motorcycles and the citizen play to various ways

== Artwork ==
=== Tea house ===
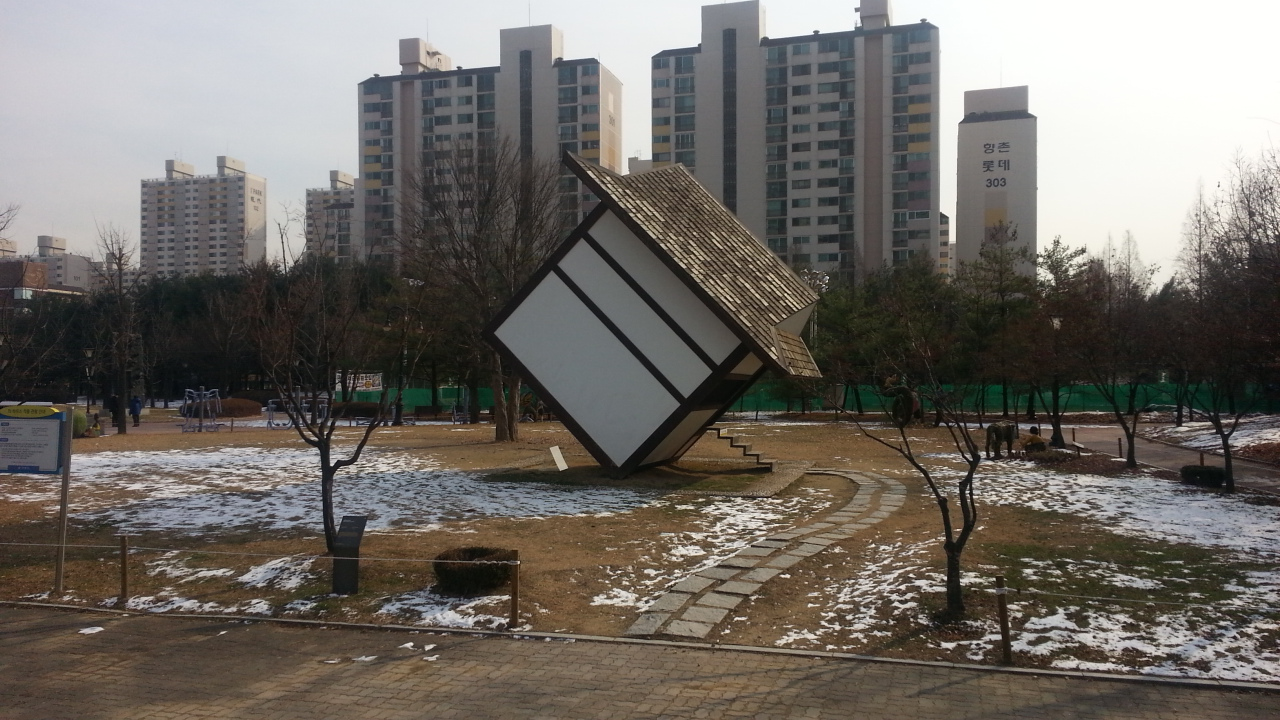
A tea house (Rirkrit Tiravanija, 2007)

In 2007, a tea house that is tilted by 45 degrees was installed. The artist, Rirkrit Tiravanija, is concerned with the social role of art and has experimented with issues such as the boundary between arts and everyday life, interaction between public and private spheres, and communication between group and individual. In this context, the artist made and served food to audiences at his exhibitions, transformed an exhibition space into an apartment, and created a backpack containing cooking utensils and maps. The artist, who had existing interest in the function of tea houses prior to this project, produced a cube shaped tea house made of stainless steel for the Villa Manin Centre for Contemporary Art (Italy) in 2005. For the tea house he created for the 2nd APAP (ANYANG PUBLIC ART PROJECT) at the Pyeongchon Central Park (Pyeongchon Jung ang Park), the artist takes its motive from Eastern tea houses, which functioned as a space for meditation as well as for conversation and social interaction.

=== Time Keeper (Gloria Friedmann, 2007) ===
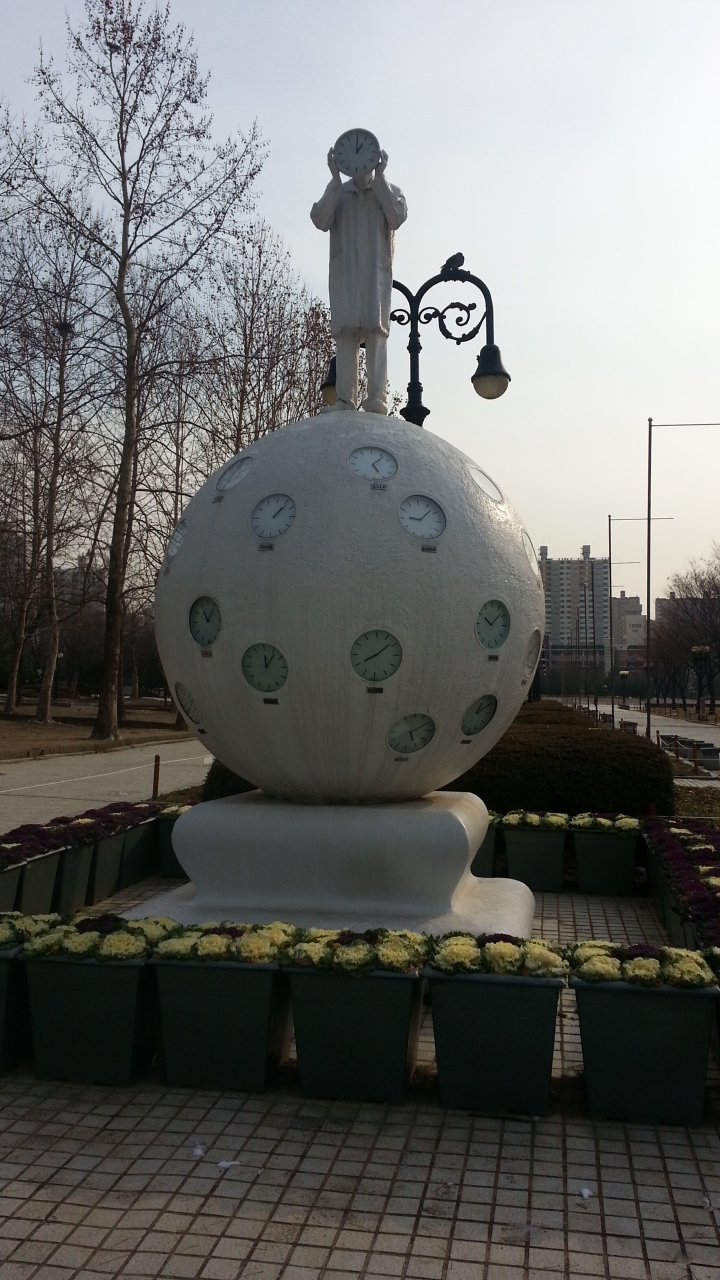
Time Keeper (Gloria Friedmann, 2007)

A man stands on a globe which has time from around the world. He doesn't see the time but the clock just keeps on ticking. The artist suggests that the people look back on their lives in flowing time through the work.

== Facilities ==
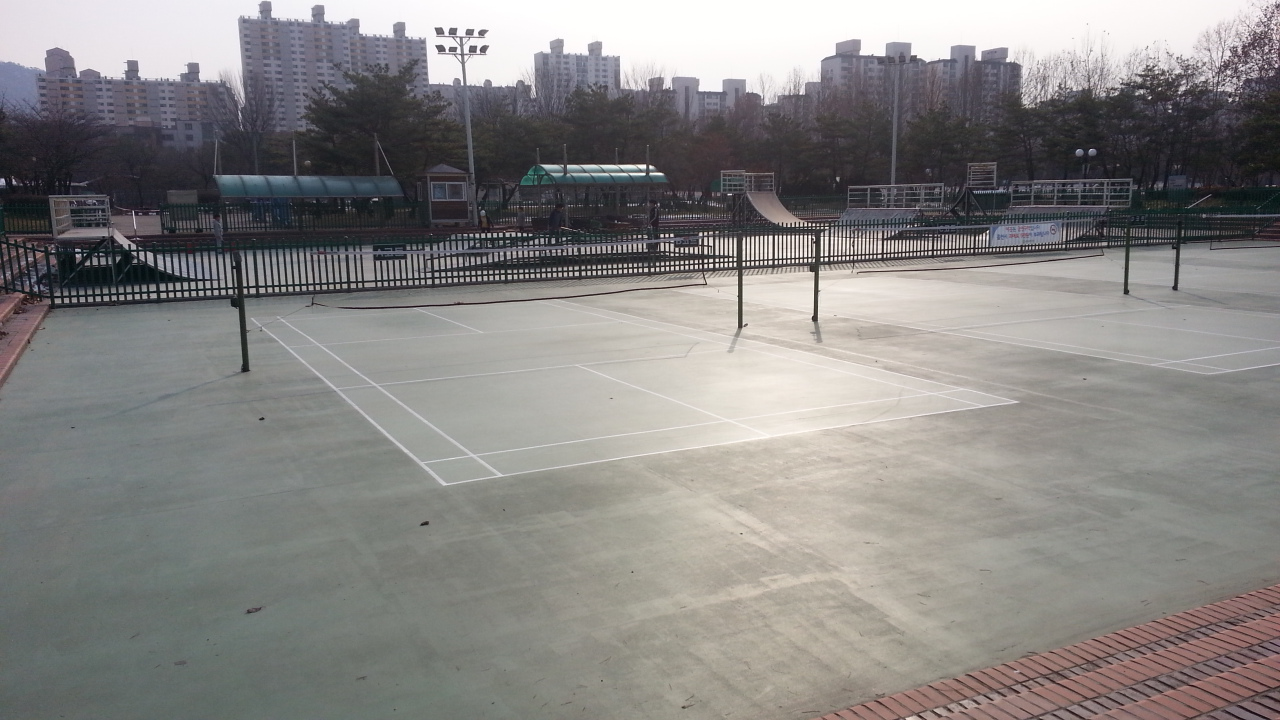
x-game, badminton court

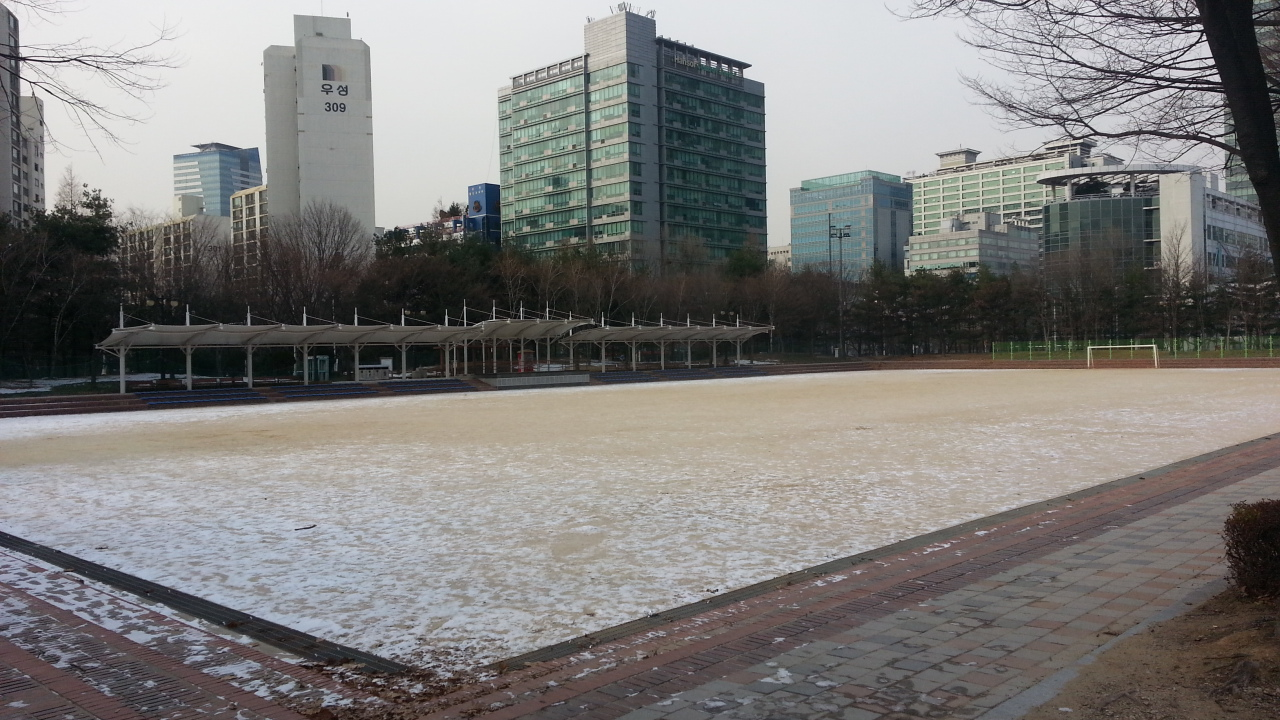
Pyeongchon Central Park soccer field

== Events ==
The Summer festival takes place at the end of August at Pyeongchon Central Park. It involves a festival of wind instruments with contests, invitation performances and a parade.

The Fall festival is at the beginning of October and takes place at Pyeongchon Central Park. It is a celebration of life in Anyang with a citizens festival featuring plays, food and markets. And many singers who (invited Anyang citizen festival) are performance for Anyang Citizen.

== Gallery ==
In winter

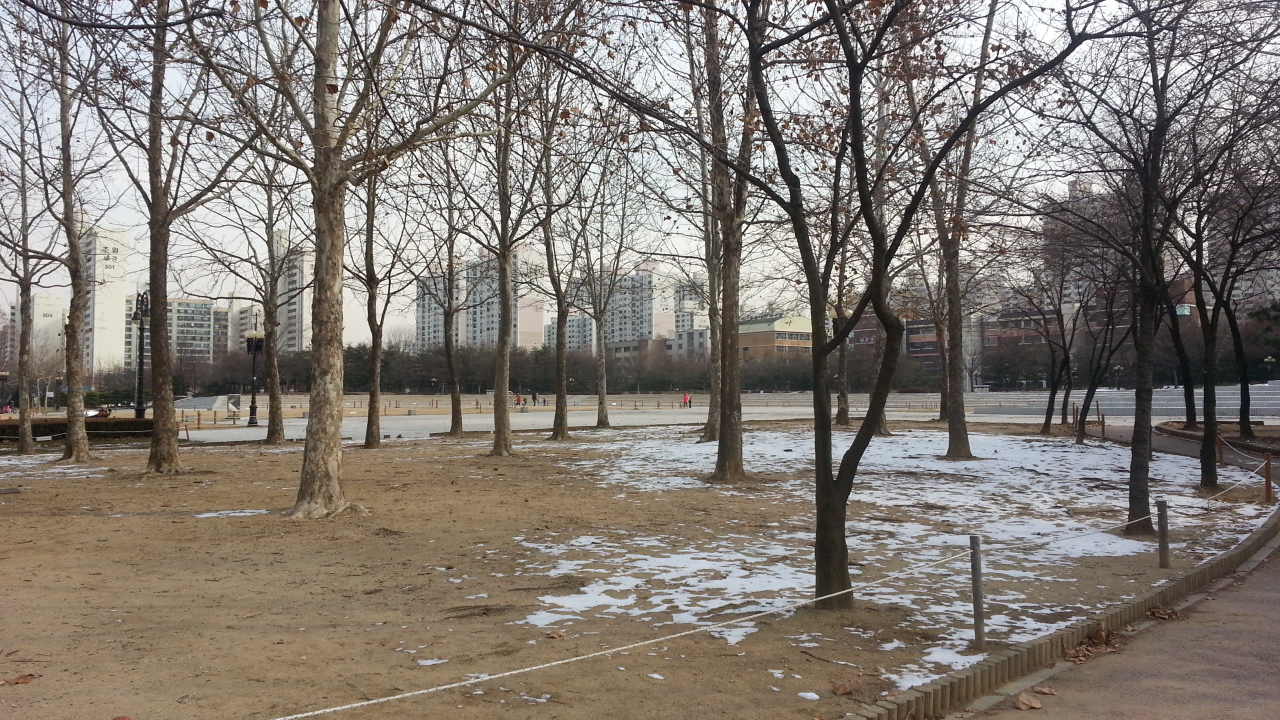
Pyeongchon Central Park

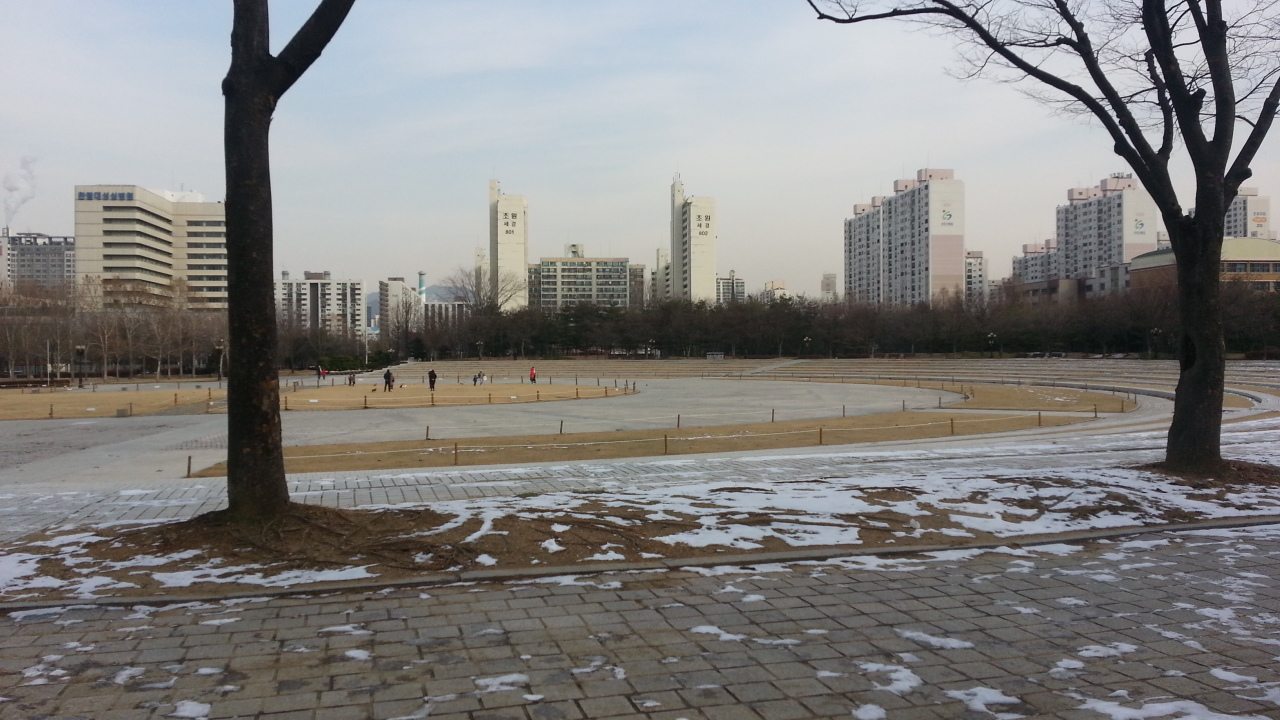
Pyeongchon Central Park

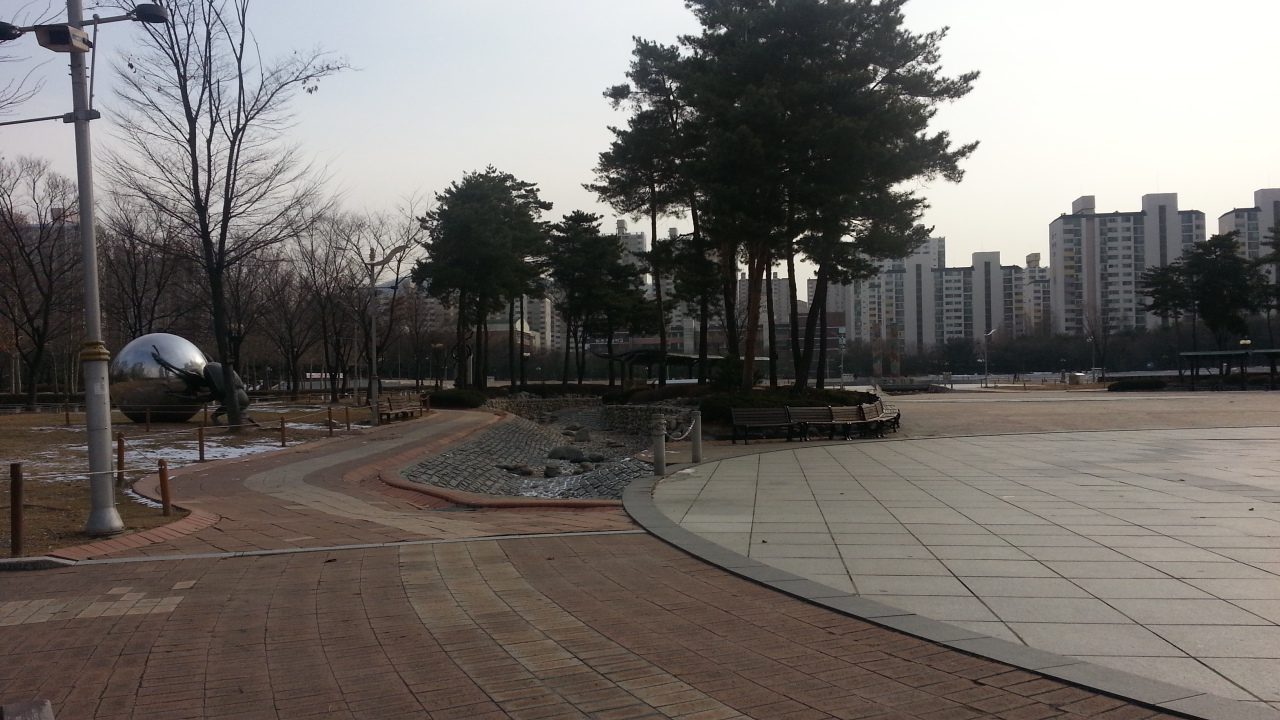
Pyeongchon Central Park

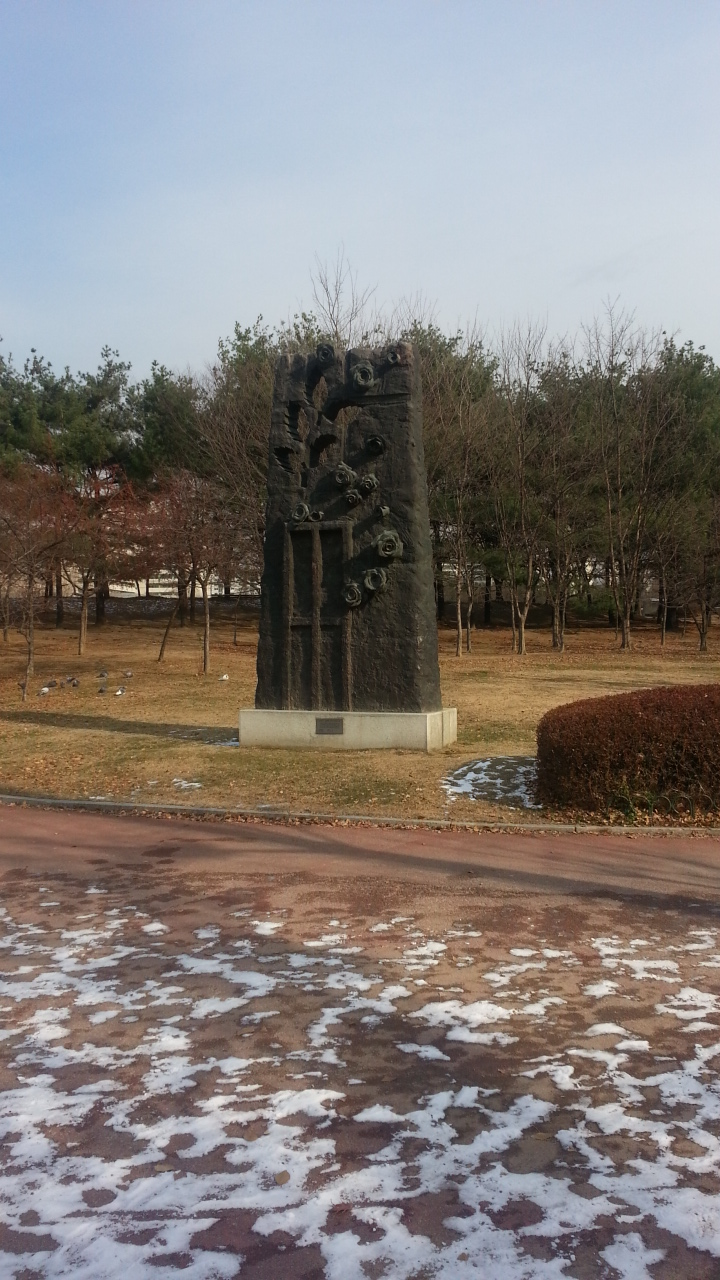
Pyeongchon Central Park Statue1

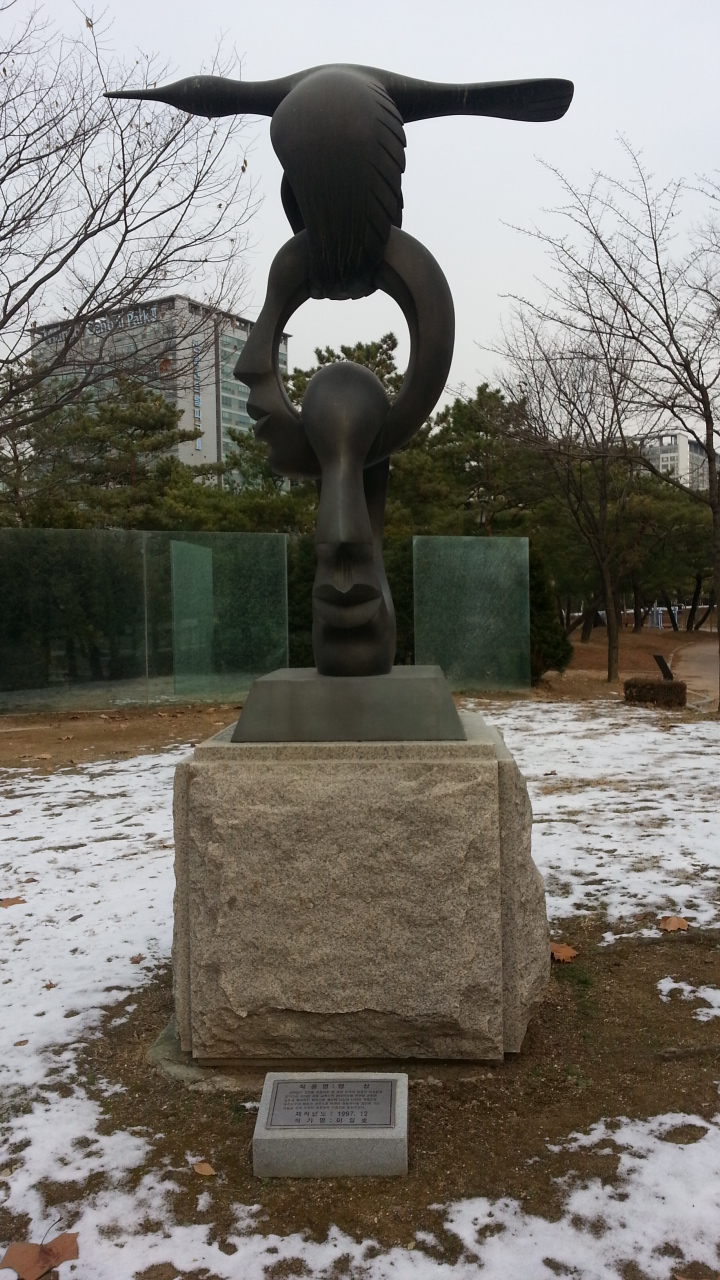
Pyeongchon Central Park (meditation)

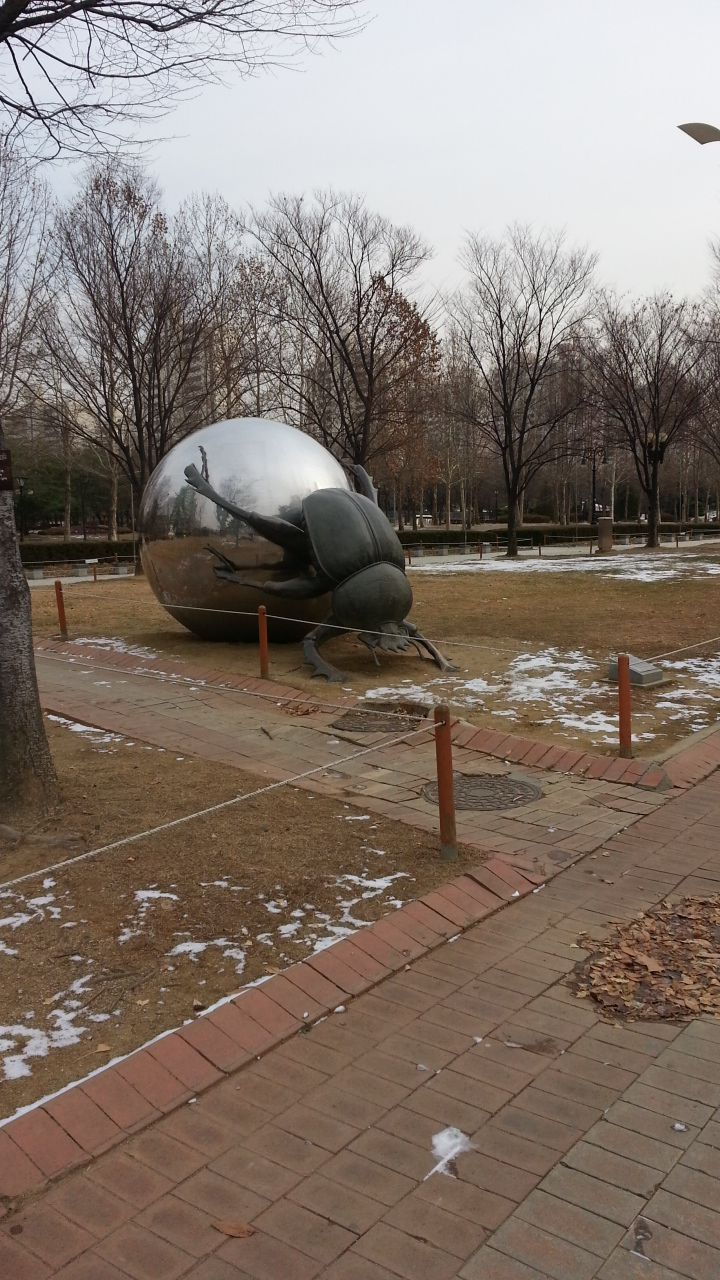
Pyeongchon Central Park (dung beetle)

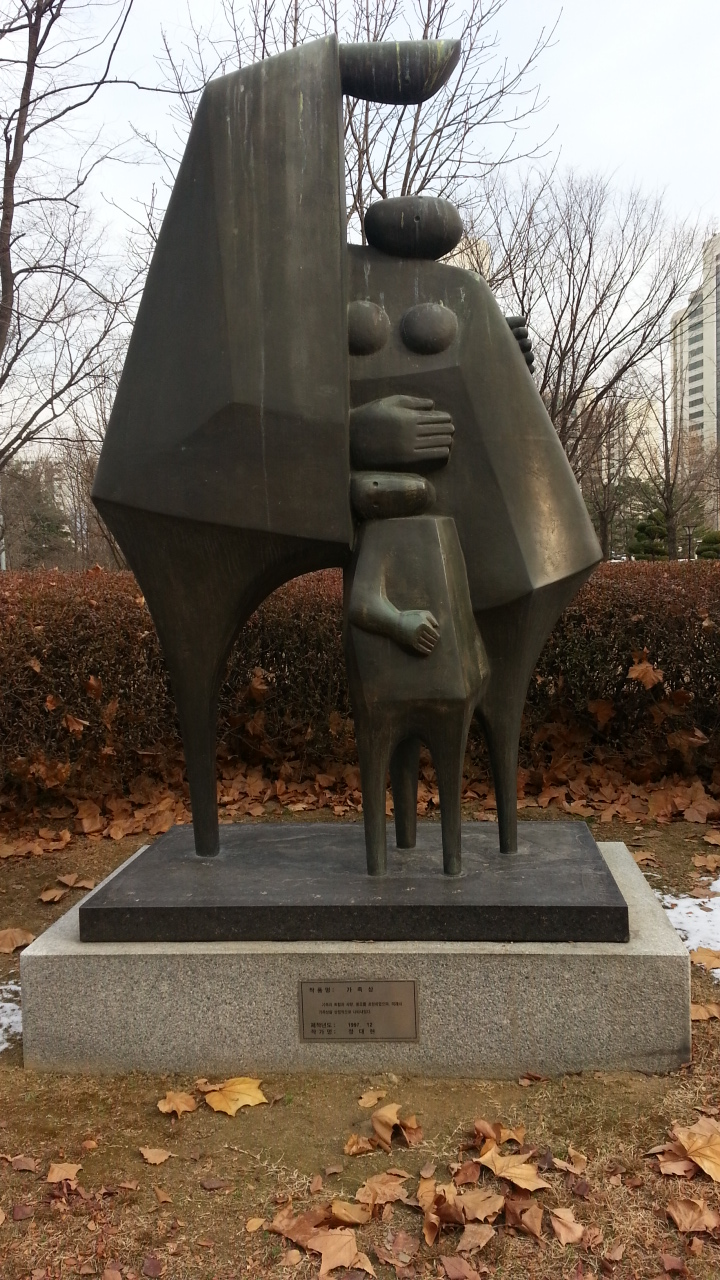
Pyeongchon Central Park (a family)
