= Sinchon-dong, Anyang =

- Hangul: 신촌동
- Hanja: 新村洞
- RR: Sinchon-dong
- MR: Sinch'on-dong

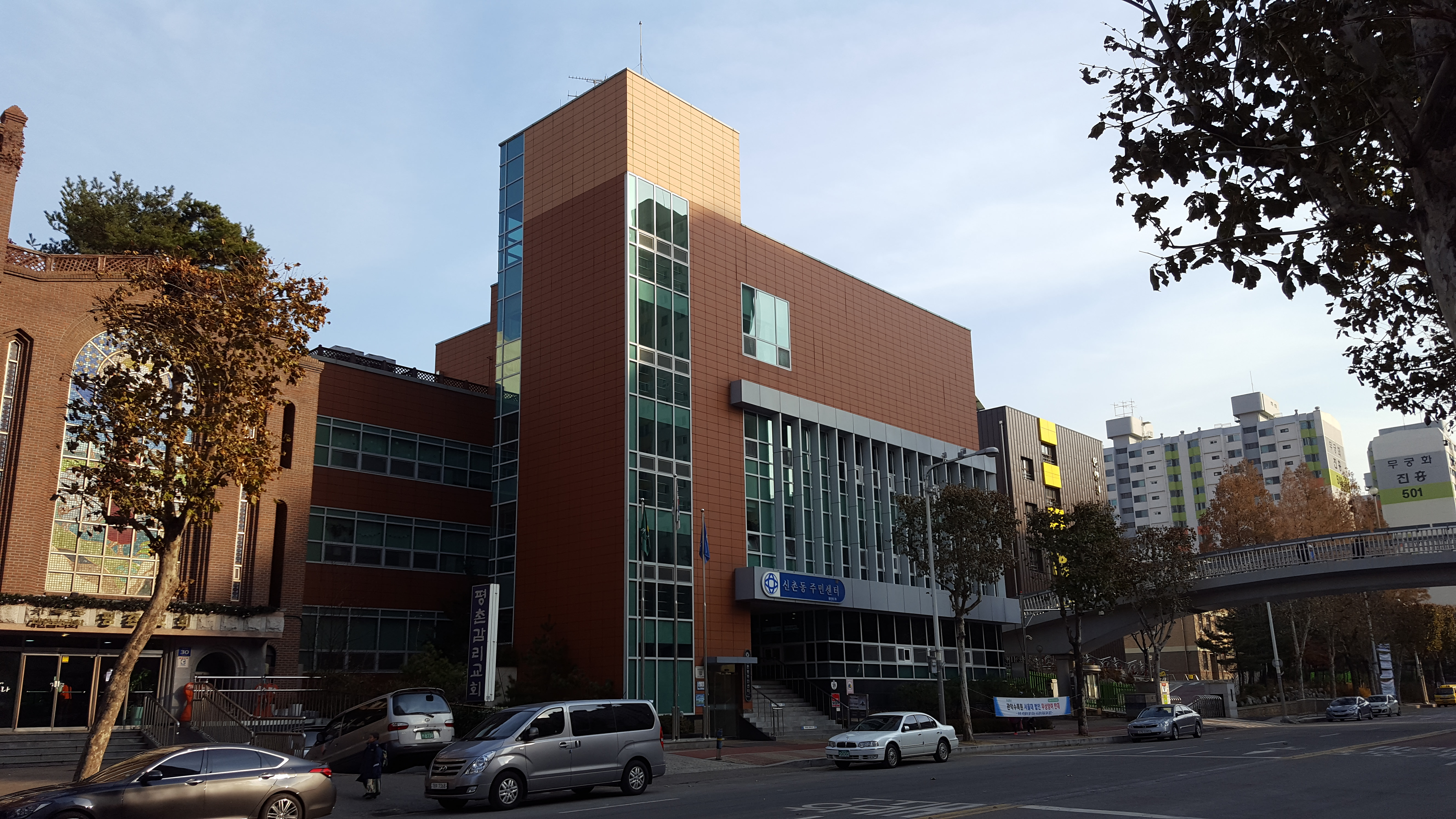
Sinchon-dong Community Center.

Sinchon-dong (Korean: 신촌동) is a neighborhood of Dongan district in the city of Anyang, Gyeonggi Province, South Korea.
