= Buheung-dong, Anyang =

Neighborhood of Anyang, South Korea

Coordinates: 37°24′N 126°57′E

- Hangul: 부흥동
- Hanja: 復興洞
- RR: Buheung-dong
- MR: Puhŭng-dong

Buheung-dong (Korean: 부흥동) is a dong (neighborhood) of Dongan District, Anyang, Gyeonggi Province, South Korea.
