= Anyang-dong =

Neighborhood of Anyang, South Korea

- Hangul: 안양동
- Hanja: 安養洞
- RR: Anyang-dong
- MR: Anyang-dong

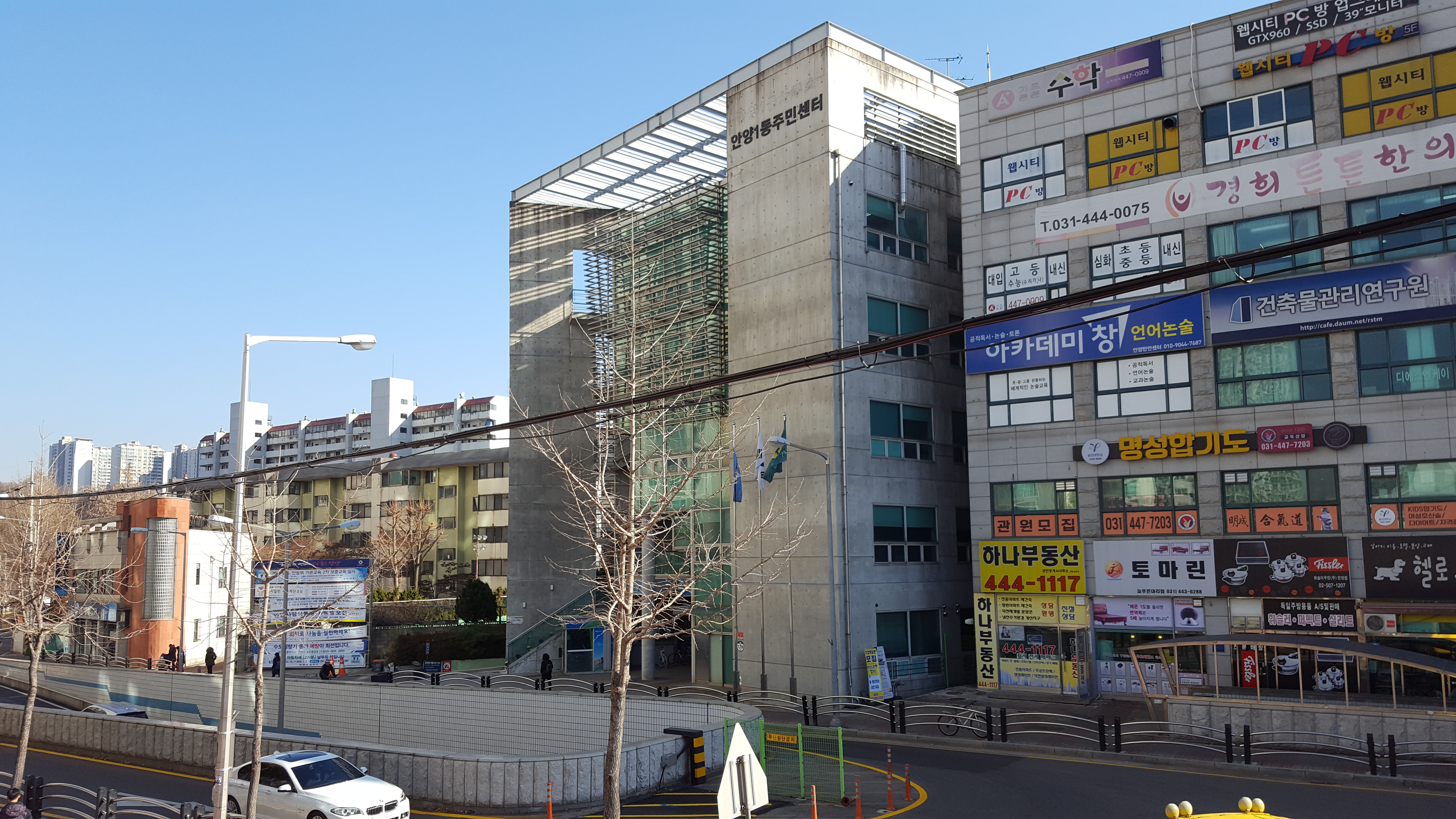
Anyang-dong Community Service Center

Anyang-dong (Korean: 안양동) is a neighborhood of Manan District in the city of Anyang, Gyeonggi Province, South Korea. It is officially divided into Anyang-1-dong, Anyang-2-dong, Anyang-3-dong, Anyang-4-dong, Anyang-5-dong, Anyang-6-dong, Anyang-7-dong, Anyang-8-dong and Anyang-9-dong.
