= Daran-dong =

Coordinates: 37°24′N 126°57′E

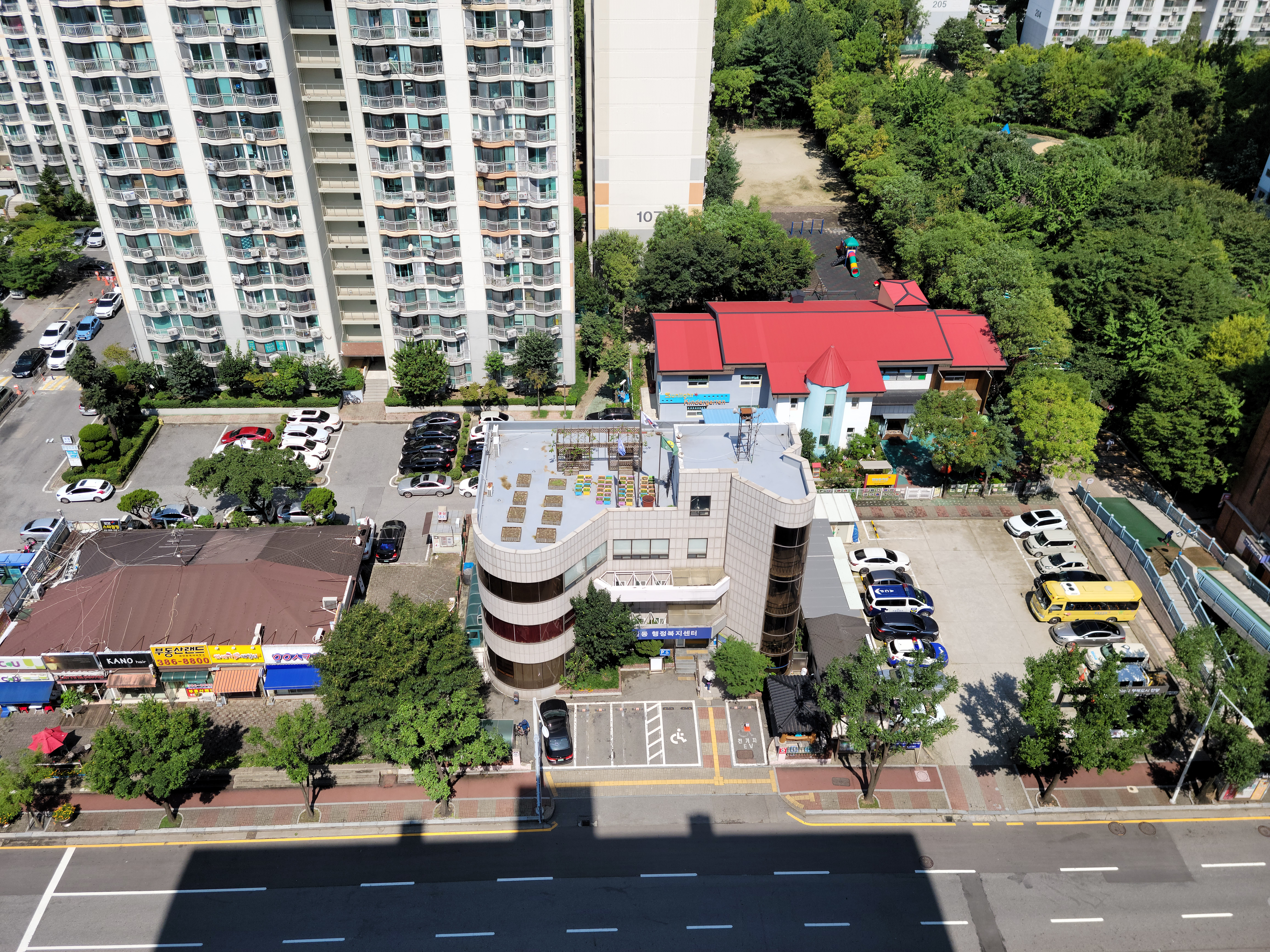

Korean name
- Hangul: 달안동
- Hanja: 達安洞
- RR: Daran-dong
- MR: Taran-dong

Daran-dong (Korean: 달안동) is a neighborhood of Dongan District, Anyang, Gyeonggi Province, South Korea.
