= Pyeongchon =

City near Anyang, South Korea

Pyeongchon 평촌신도시
- Pyeongchon New Town
- Interactive map of Pyeongchon
- Coordinates: 37.39°N 126.96°E
- Country: South Korea
- Province: Gyeonggi
- District: Dongan

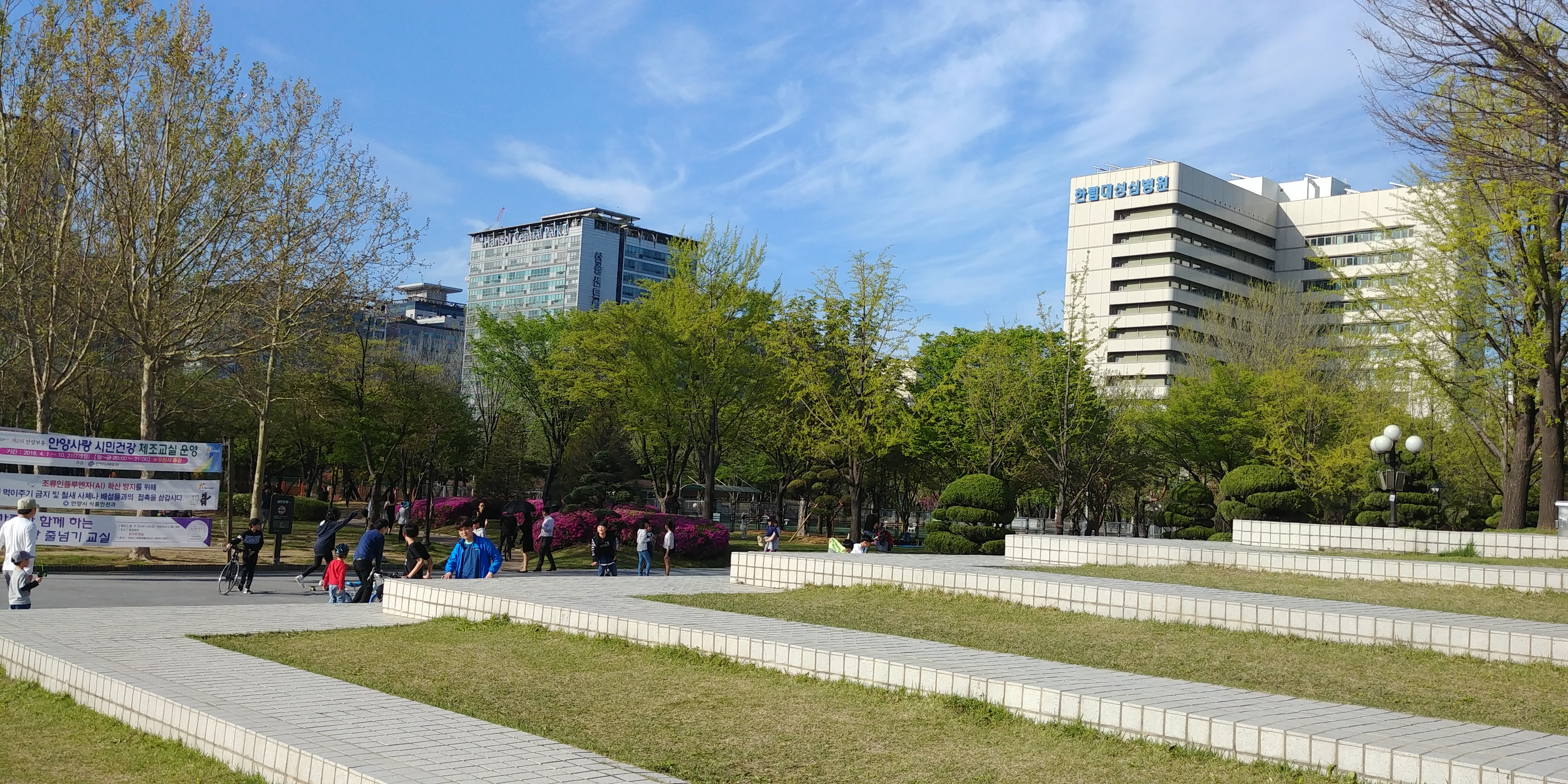
Pyeongchon Central Park in Anyang, Korea.

Pyeongchon New Town (Korean: 평촌신도시) is a city surrounding Dongan District, Anyang, Gyeonggi Province, South Korea. It is one of five "Phase 1 new towns" in the outskirts of Seoul that were planned for construction in the 1980s due to a major housing crisis. There is an ongoing project to renovate and reconstruct several residential complexes in the city, which is slated for completion in 2035.

== History ==
In the late 1980s, the South Korean government created the "Two Million Home Construction Plan" in an effort to combat a major housing crisis that had been occurring. This plan involved the construction of five "new towns" surrounding the city of Seoul. Pyeongchon was one of these towns, with the other four being Bundang, Ilsan, Sanbon, and Joongdong. Pyeongchon specifically was first planned in August 1988, initially planned as a business area for the city of Anyang.

Initially, large areas of land in all five new towns were designated as commercial areas. However, by the end of the 1990s, the areas were largely unsuccessful in attracting businesses. As residential areas, however, the new towns proved highly successful. Residential districts were mostly developed and populated by the mid-1990s, at the time providing about 300,000 housing units.

== City planning ==
Pyeongchon was built between National Route 1 and National Route 47, placing it in a major spot of the Seoul Metropolitan Area with high traffic. To improve traffic, 14 lines of roads were developed, which also facilitated urban expansion in the surrounding areas. Furthermore, the Gwacheon Subway line was built across the town, and the city was integrated into the transportation system of the Seoul Metropolitan Area.

The city's planning was also focused on being "human oriented" with the pedestrian-focused green area system. A network of paths for pedestrians was developed which, unlike Sidewalks, were independent of roads, and connected numerous facilities on their own. Additionally, in an effort to minimize environmental pollution, the city is primarily run on clean energy sources and has well-developed Sewage treatment and waste incineration facilities.

37.39°N 126.96°E
