= Beomgye-dong =

Coordinates: 37°23′N 126°57′E

- Hangul: 범계동
- RR: Beomgye-dong
- MR: Pŏmgye-dong

Beomgye-dong (Korean: 범계동) is a neighborhood of Dongan District, Anyang, Gyeonggi Province, South Korea. here are Beomgye Station, Gyeongsu Industrial Road, and Citizen's Boulevard as transportation centers for Pyeongchon New Town, and it is an apartment complex concentrated area with 5,079 households in 70 buildings in eight apartment complexes.
