= Gwiin-dong =

Coordinates: 37°23′N 126°58′E

- Hangul: 귀인동
- Hanja: 貴仁洞
- RR: Gwiin-dong
- MR: Kwiin-dong

Gwiin-dong Community Service Center

Gwiin-dong (Korean: 귀인동) is a neighborhood of Dongan District, Anyang, Gyeonggi Province, South Korea.
