= Burim-dong, Anyang =

- Hangul: 부림동
- Hanja: 富林洞
- RR: Burim-dong
- MR: Purim-dong

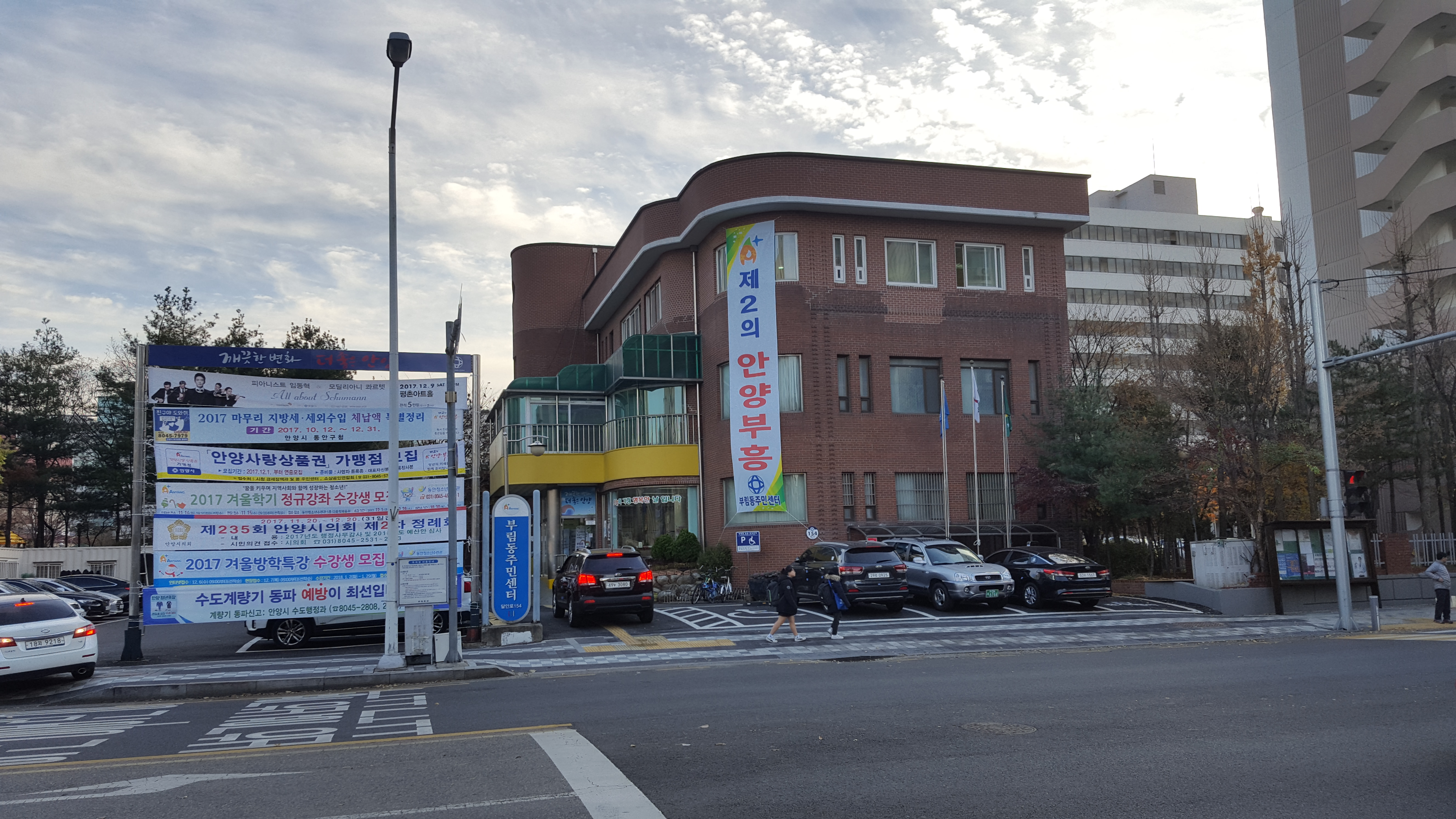
Burim-dong Community Service Centre

Burim-dong (Korean: 부림동) is a dong (neighborhood) of Dongan District, Anyang, Gyeonggi Province, South Korea.
