= Pyeongan-dong, Anyang =

Coordinates: 37°23′N 126°58′E

- Hangul: 평안동
- Hanja: 坪安洞
- RR: Pyeongan-dong
- MR: P'yŏngan-dong

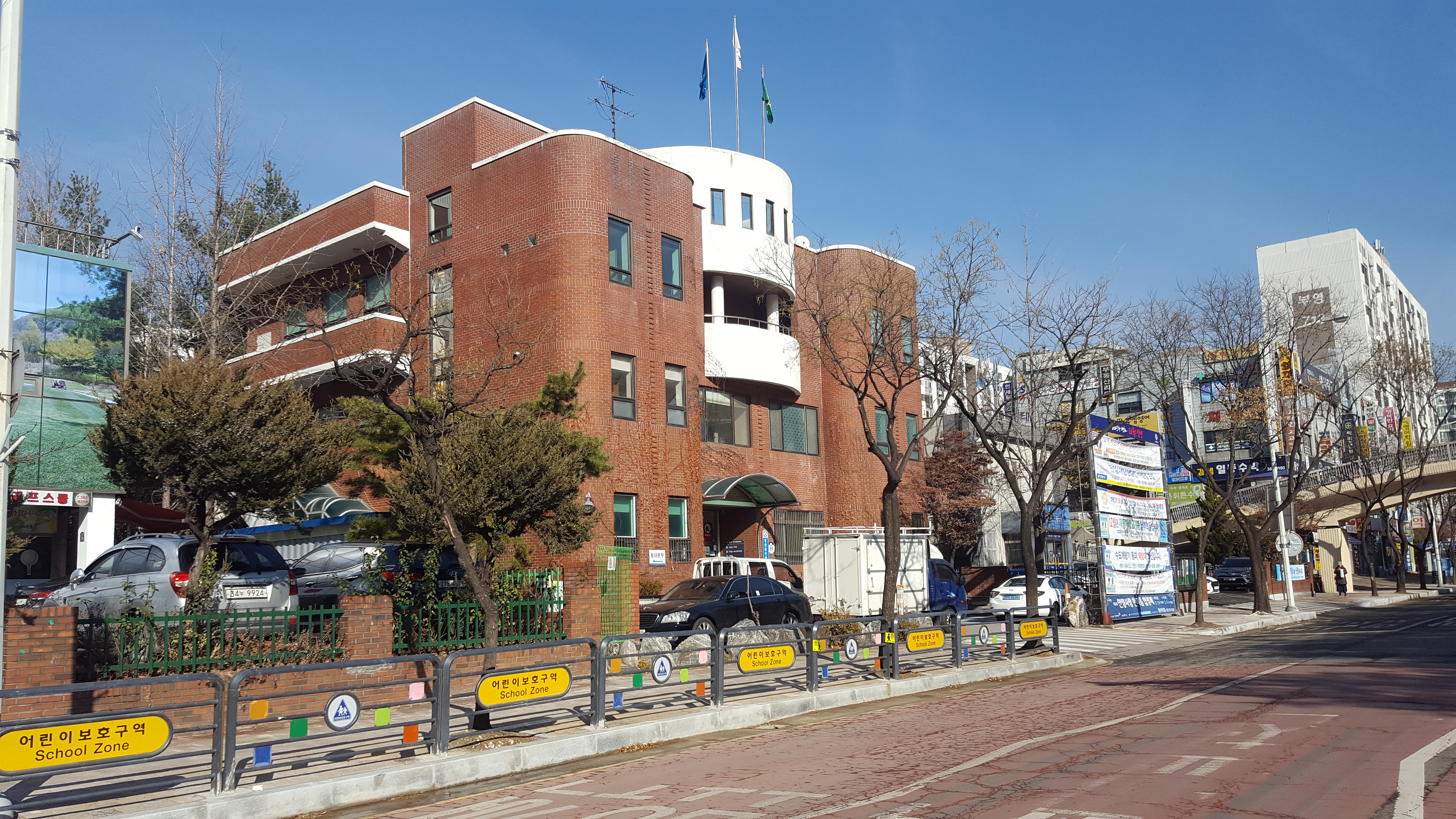
Pyeongan-dong Community Center

Pyeongan-dong (Korean: 평안동) is a neighborhood of Dongan district in the city of Anyang, Gyeonggi Province, South Korea.
