= Bakdal-dong =

Area of Anyang in Gyeonggi, South Korea

Coordinates: 37°24′N 126°55′E

- Hangul: 박달동
- Hanja: 博達洞
- RR: Bakdal-dong
- MR: Paktal-dong

Bakdal-dong (Korean: 박달동) is a neighborhood of Manan District, Anyang, Gyeonggi Province, South Korea. It is officially divided into Bakdal-1-dong and Bakdal-2-dong.
