= Manan District =

District of Anyang, South Korea

- Non-autonomous District
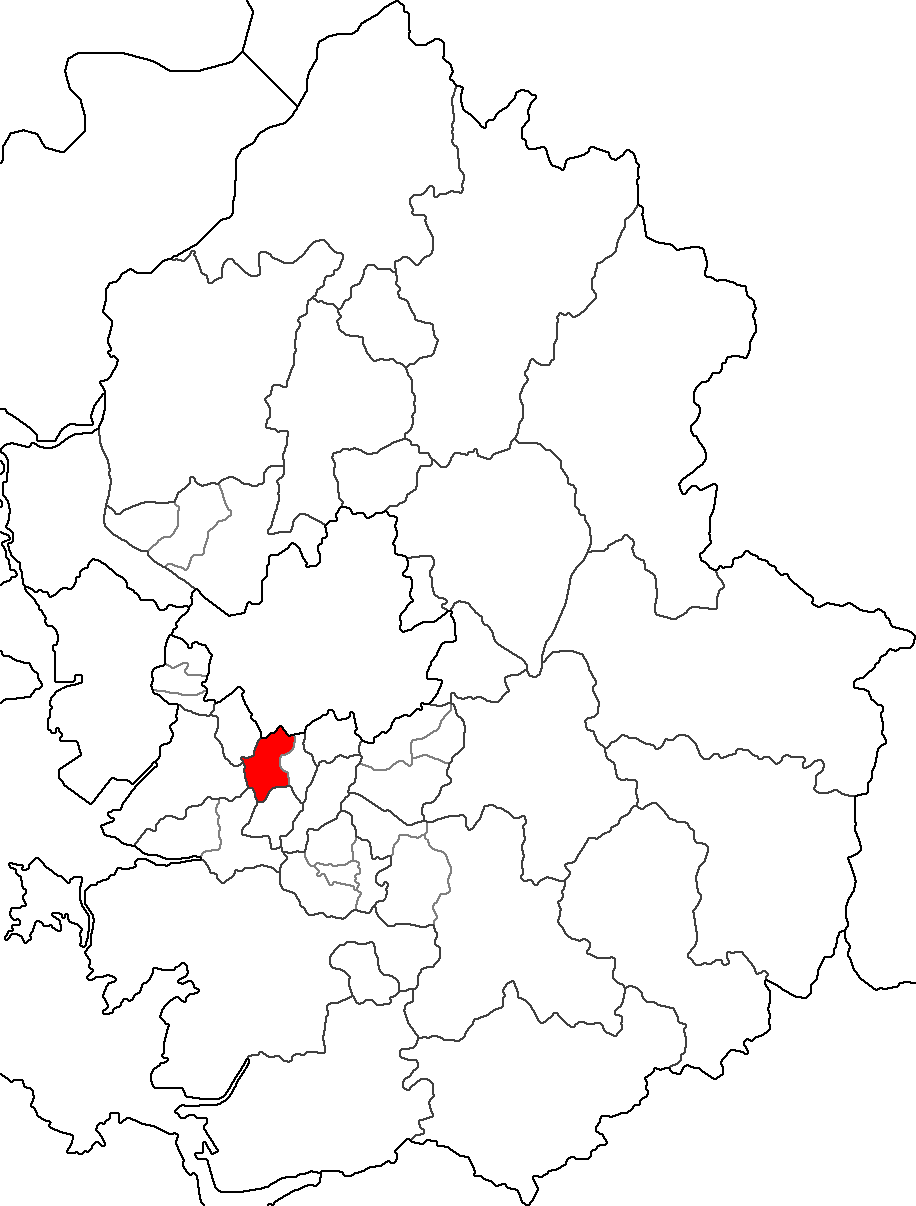
- Map of Gyeonggi Province highlighting Manan District.
- Country: South Korea
- Region: Sudogwon (Gijeon)
- Province: Gyeonggi
- City: Anyang

Area
  - Total: 36.55 km^{2} (14.11 sq mi)

Population
  - Dialect: Seoul
- Website: Manan District Office

Korean name
- Hangul: 만안구
- Hanja: 萬安區
- RR: Manan-gu
- MR: Manan-gu

Manan District (Korean: 만안구) is a district of the city of Anyang in Gyeonggi Province, South Korea.

== Administrative divisions ==
Manan District is divided into the following "dong"s.

- Anyang 1 to 9 Dong
- Seoksu 1 to 3 Dong
- Bakdal 1 to 2 Dong

== See also ==
- Anyang, Gyeonggi
- Dongan District
