= Dongan District, Anyang =

District of Anyang, South Korea

Dongan District
- Non-autonomous District
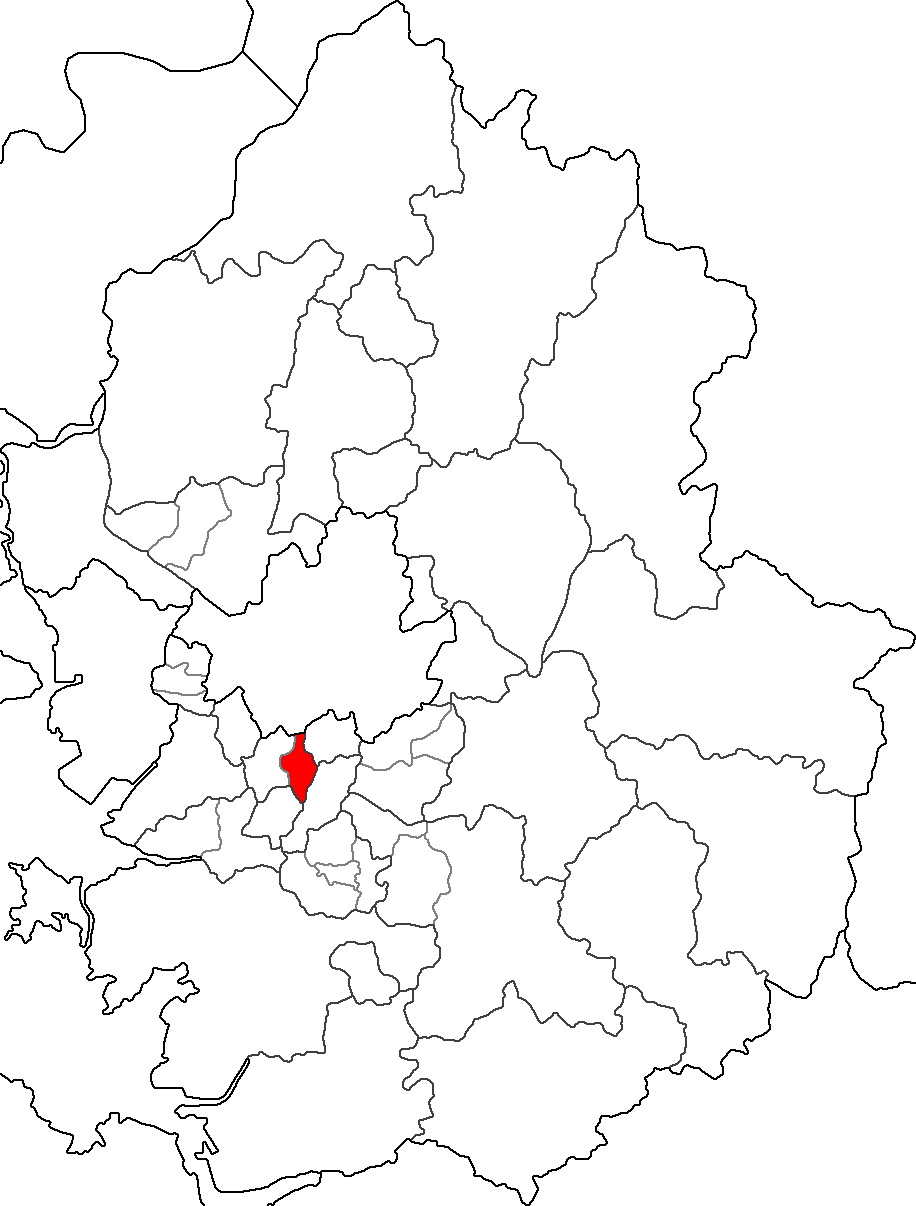
- Map of Gyeonggi Province highlighting Dongan District.
- Country: South Korea
- Region: Sudogwon (SCA)
- Province: Gyeonggi
- City: Anyang

Area
  - Total: 21.92 km^{2} (8.46 sq mi)

Population
  - Dialect: Seoul
- Website: Dongan District Office

Korean name
- Hangul: 동안구
- Hanja: 東安區
- RR: Dongan-gu
- MR: Tongan-gu

Dongan District (Korean: 동안구) is a district of the city of Anyang in Gyeonggi Province, South Korea.

== Administrative divisions ==
Dongan District is divided into the following "dong"s.

- Bisan-dong (Divided in turn into Bisan 1 to 3 Dong, Buheung-dong and Daran-dong)
- Gwanyang-dong (Divided in turn into Gwanyang 1 and 2 Dong and Burim-dong)
- Pyeongchon-dong (Divided in turn into Pyeongchon-dong, Pyeongan-dong and Gwiin-dong)
- Hogye-dong (Divided in turn into Hogye 1 to 3 Dong, Beomgye-dong, Sinchon-dong and Galsan-dong)

== See also ==
- Anyang, Gyeonggi
- Manan District
