= List of cities and counties of North Chungcheong Province =

North Chungcheong Province is divided into 3 cities (si) and 8 counties (gun). The city and county names below are given in English, Hangul, and Hanja.

== Cities ==
- Cheongju (청주시; 淸州市)
- Chungju (충주시; 忠州市)
- Jecheon (제천시; 堤川市)

== Counties ==
- Boeun County (보은군; 報恩郡)
- Danyang County (단양군; 丹陽郡)
- Eumseong County (음성군; 陰城郡)
- Goesan County (괴산군; 槐山郡)
- Jeungpyeong County (증평군; 曾坪郡)
- Jincheon County (진천군; 鎭川郡)
- Okcheon County (옥천군; 沃川郡)
- Yeongdong County (영동군; 永同郡)

== List by population and area ==
Name	Population (2007)	Area	Population Density (2007)
Cheongju	750,723	967.62 km^{2} (373.59 sq mi)	775.8 /km^{2} (2009 /sq mi)
Chungju	205,907	984.09 km^{2} (379.96 sq mi)	209.2 /km^{2} (542 /sq mi)
Jecheon	138,201	882.48 km^{2} (340.73 sq mi)	156.6 /km^{2} (406 /sq mi)
Boeun County	37,114	584.47 km^{2} (211.76 sq mi)	63.5 /km^{2} (175 /sq mi)
Danyang County	34,122	780.15 km^{2} (301.14 sq mi)	43.7 /km^{2} (113 /sq mi)
Eumseong County	85,969	520.53 km^{2} (200.98 sq mi)	165.1 /km^{2} (428 /sq mi)
Goesan County	38,595	842.19 km^{2} (325.17 sq mi)	45.8 /km^{2} (119 /sq mi)
Jeungpyeong County	30,607	81.83 km^{2} (31.59 sq mi)	374.0 /km^{2} (969 /sq mi)
Jincheon County	60,155	405.98 km^{2} (156.75 sq mi)	148.2 /km^{2} (384 /sq mi)
Okcheon County	55,610	537.07 km^{2} (207.36 sq mi)	103.5 /km^{2} (268 /sq mi)
Yeongdong County	51,800	845.03 km^{2} (326.27 sq mi)	61.3 /km^{2} (159 /sq mi)

== Subdivisions ==
Municipal	Subdivisions
Cheongju	Cheongwon District; Naesu-eup; Ochang-eup; Bugi-myeon; Naedeok 1-dong; Naedeok 2-dong; Ogeunjang-dong; Uam-dong; Yullyang·Sacheon-dong; Heungdeok District; Osong-eup; Gangnae-myeon; Oksan-myeon; Gagyeong-dong; Gangseo 1-dong; Gangseo 2-dong; Bokdae 1-dong; Bokdae 2-dong; Bongmyeong 1-dong; Bongmyeong 2·Songjeong-dong; Uncheon·Sinbong-dong; Sangdang District; Geumcheon-dong; Seongan-dong; Yeongun-dong; Yongdam·Myeongam·Sanseong-dong; Yongam 1-dong; Yongam 2-dong; Jungang-dong; Tap·Daeseong-dong; Gadeok-myeon; Namil-myeon; Nangseong-myeon; Munui-myeon; Miwon-myeon; Seowon District; Mochung-dong; Bunpyeong-dong; Sajik 1-dong; Sajik 2-dong; Sachang-dong; Sannam-dong; Seonghwa·Gaesin·Jungnim-dong; Sugok 1-dong; Sugok 2-dong; Nami-myeon; Hyeondo-myeon
Chungju	Seongnae·Chungin-dong; Gyohyeon·Allim-dong; Gyohyeon-dong; Yongsan-dong; Jihyeon-dong; Munwha-dong; Hoam·Jik-dong; Dalcheon-dong; Bongbang-dong; Chilgeum·Geumreung-dong; Yeonsu-dong; Mokhaeng·Yongtan-dong; Judeok-eub; Salmi-myeon; Suanbo-myeon; Daesowon-myeon; Shinni-myeon; Noeun-myeon; Angseong-myeon; Gageum-myeon; Geumga-myeon; Dongnyang-myeon; Sancheok-myeon; Eomjeong-myeon; Sotae-myeon
Jecheon	Gyo-dong; Namhyeon-dong; Sinback-dong; Yeongseo-dong; Yongdu-dong; Uiam-dong; Inseong-dong; Cheongjeon-dong; Hwasan-dong; Bongyang-eup; Geumseong-myeon; Deoksan-myeon; Baegun-myeon; Songhak-myeon; Susan-myeon; Cheongpung-myeon; Hansu-myeon
Boeun County	
Danyang County	
Eumseong County	
Goesan County	
Jeungpyeong County	
Jincheon County	
Okcheon County	
Yeongdong County	
