= Youn Kwan-suk =

South Korean activist, labourer and politician

- 윤관석
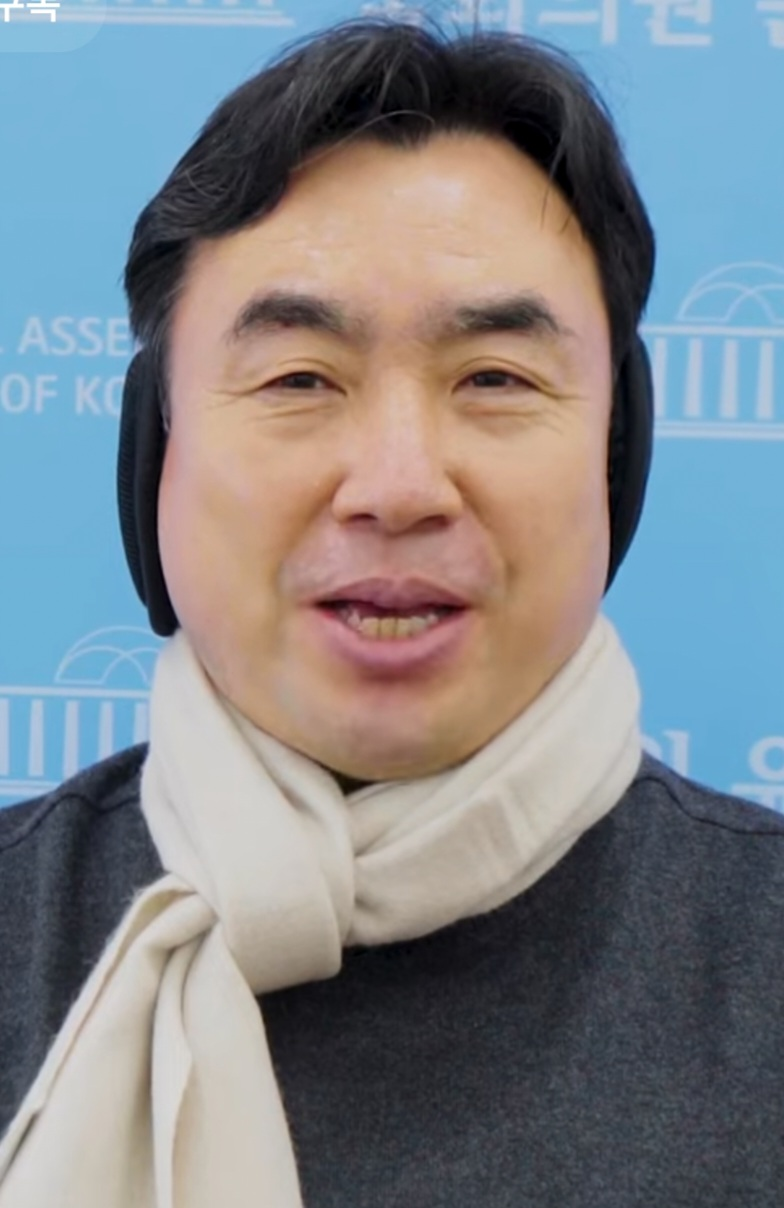

Secretary-General of the Democratic Party
- In office 4 May 2021 – 24 November 2021
- President: Song Young-gil
- Preceded by: Park Kwang-on
- Succeeded by: Kim Yeong-jin

Member of the National Assembly
- In office 30 May 2012 – 29 May 2024
- Preceded by: Cho Jun-hyuk
- Succeeded by: Lee Hoon-gi
- Constituency: Namdong B (Incheon)

Personal details
- Born: 17 August 1960 (age 66) Yongsan, Seoul, South Korea
- Party: Democratic
- Other political affiliations: MDP (2000–2003); Uri (2003–2007); GUDNP (2007–2008); UDP (2008); Democratic (2008–2011); DUP (2011–2013); Democratic Party (2013–2014); NPAD (2014–2015)
- Spouse: Chang Ji-sun
- Education: Hanyang University
- Occupation: Activist, labourer, politician

Youn Kwan-suk (Korean: 윤관석, born 17 August 1960) is a South Korean activist, labourer and politician who served Secretary-General of the Democratic Party from 4 May to 24 November 2021. He has also been the Member of the National Assembly for Namdong B constituency since 2012.

== Career ==
Born in Yongsan, Seoul, Youn attended Posung High School before majoring journalism at Hanyang University.

Following the graduation, he used to be involved in labour movements in Incheon from 1985. After that, he had also worked at civil organisations before joining politics as a member of the Millennium Democratic Party (MDP) in 2000. He became the Uri Party Division Chief of Namdong 2nd constituency and Secretary-General of Incheon in 2004. During the 2008 election, he served as the Head of the Election Polling Committee of the United Democratic Party (UDP) in Incheon. He became the Spokesperson to Hong Young-pyo, who was contesting for the 2009 Bupyeong 2nd by-election; Hong was later elected.

After Song Young-gil was elected the Mayor of Incheon in 2010, Youn became the Spokesperson of Incheon. He then contested for Namdong 2nd constituency in the 2012 election and was elected. On 26 September 2012, he was appointed the new Parliamentary Spokesperson of the Democratic Unionist Party (DUP), replacing Woo Won-shik who moved to the presidential campaign of Moon Jae-in that lost to Park Geun-hye the 2012 presidential election. When Park nominated Yoon Chang-jung, Youn urged Yoon to resign.

In the 2016 election, Youn became the opposition unity candidate for Namdong 2nd following the resignation of Hong Jung-gun (People's Party) and an agreement with Bae Jin-gyo (Justice Party). He received 55.49% and defeated Cho Jun-hyuk with a margin of 13.67%. After Choo Mi-ae became the President of the Democratic Party, he was appointed the Chief Spokesperson of the party. On 14 February 2018, he was appointed the Democratic Party Incheon chief following the resignation of Park Nam-choon that contested for the Incheon mayorship in the local elections.

In the 2020 election, Youn obtained 54.57% and defeated the former MP Rhie Won-bok. On 4 May 2021, he was appointed the Secretary-General of the Democratic Party under the newly elected party President Song Young-gil.

== Election results ==
| Year | Elections | Constituency | Political party | Votes (%) | Remarks |
|---|---|---|---|---|---|
| 2012 | 19th National Assembly General Election | Namdong B (Incheon) | DUP | 33,701 (43.90%) | Won |
| 2016 | 20th National Assembly General Election | Namdong B (Incheon) | Democratic | 66,136 (55.49%) | Won |
| 2020 | 21st National Assembly General Election | Namdong B (Incheon) | Democratic | 78,795 (54.57%) | Won |
