= Lim Ho-seon =

South Korean politician

Member of the National Assembly
- Incumbent
- Assumed office 30 May 2020
- Preceded by: Kyung Dae-soo
- Constituency: Jeungpyeong–Jincheon–Eumseong (North Chungcheong)

Senior Deputy Secretary-General of the Democratic Party of Korea
- In office 2025–2026

Personal details
- Party: Democratic Party of Korea

Lim Ho-seon (Korean: 임호선) is a South Korean politician. Lim is a member of the National Assembly representing the Jeungpyeong, Jincheon, and Eumseong counties. From 2025 to 2026, Lim was the Democratic Party of Korea's Senior Deputy Secretary-General. Scammers posing as aids of Lim scammed a restaurant out of 150,000 won in appetizer costs as part of a larger trend of scammers posing as aides of politicians.

== Election results ==
Year	Elections	Constituency	Political party	Votes (%)	Results
2020	21st National Assembly General Election	Jeungpyeong–Jincheon–Eumseong (North Chungcheong)	Democratic	54,126 (50.68%)	Won
2024	22nd National Assembly General Election	Jeungpyeong–Jincheon–Eumseong (North Chungcheong)	Democratic	62,370 (53.95%)	Won
