= Akhwibong =

Mountain in South Korea

Coordinates: 36.722°N 128.006°E

Akwibong

Highest point
- Elevation: 940 m (3,080 ft)

Geography
- Location: South Korea

Korean name
- Hangul: 악휘봉
- Hanja: 樂輝峰
- RR: Akhwibong
- MR: Akhwibong

Akwibong (Korean: 악휘봉) is a mountain in Goesan County, North Chungcheong Province in South Korea. It has an elevation of 940 metres (3,084 ft).

== See also ==
- List of mountains in Korea
