= 2016 Democratic Party (South Korea, 2015) leadership election =

2016 Democratic Party leadership election
- 27 August 2016
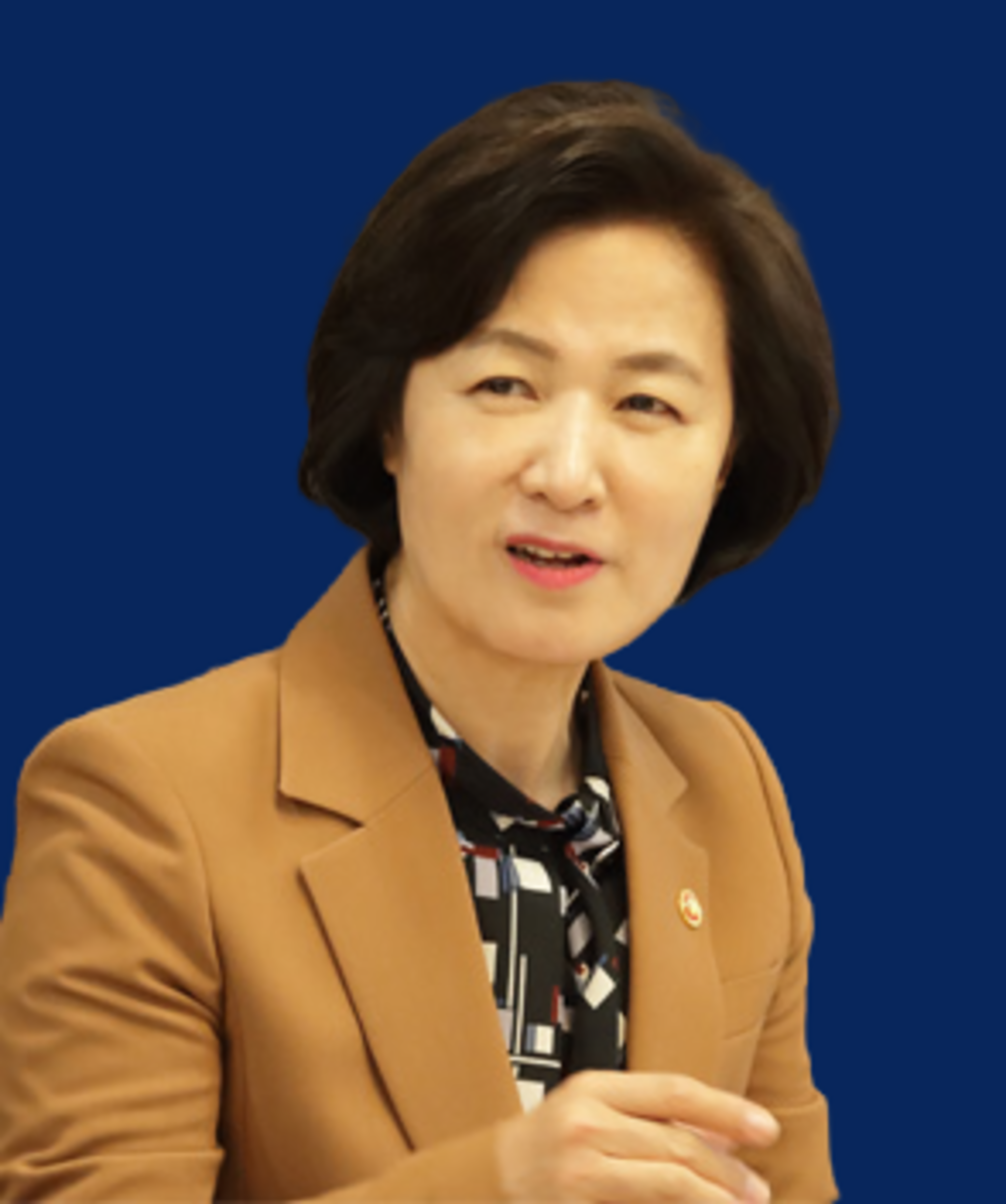

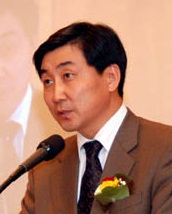

Candidate	Choo Mi-ae	Lee Jong-kul	Kim Sang-gon
Delegates	51.54%	25.24%	23.24%
Party members	61.66%	18.09%	20.25%
Opinion poll	45.52%	30.59%	23.90%
Non-voting members poll	55.15%	25.25%	19.60%
Total	54.03%	23.89%	22.08%
Leader before election
Kim Chong-in (Interim)
Elected Leader
Choo Mi-ae

The Democratic Party held a leadership election on 27 August 2016. It was to elect a successor to interim leader Kim Chong-in, who was the leader of the 2016 legislative election. The elected leader was slated to serve a 2-year term.

The new leader, Choo Mi-ae was the first leader from Daegu–Gyeongbuk (TK) region in the history of the Democratic Party.

== Candidates ==
=== Dropped out ===
- Song Young-gil, member of the National Assembly, former Mayor of Incheon.

=== Advance to the finals ===
- Kim Sang-gon, former Superintendent of Education of Gyeonggi Province.
- Lee Jong-kul, member of the National Assembly, former Floor leader of the party.
- Choo Mi-ae, member of the National Assembly.

== Results ==
The ratio of the results by sector was 45% for delegates, 30% for party members, 15% for opinion poll and 10% for non-voting members poll.

Final results
Candidates	Delegates (45%)	Party members (30%)	Opinion poll (15%)	Non-voting members poll (10%)	Total (100%)
Choo Mi-ae	51.54%	61.66%	45.52%	55.15%	54.03%
Lee Jong-kul	25.24%	18.09%	30.59%	25.25%	23.89%
Kim Sang-gon	23.24%	20.25%	23.90%	19.60%	22.08%
