= Baegaksan =

Mountain in South Korea

Coordinates: 34°46′N 127°07′E

Akwibong

Highest point
- Elevation: 858 m (2,815 ft)

Geography
- Location: South Korea

Korean name
- Hangul: 백악산
- Hanja: 百岳山
- RR: Baegaksan
- MR: Paegaksan

Baegaksan (Korean: 백악산) is a mountain between Goesan County, North Chungcheong Province and Sangju, North Gyeongsang Province in South Korea. It has an elevation of 858 m (2,815 ft).

== See also ==
- List of mountains in Korea
