= Park Kwang-on =

South Korean politician (born 1957)

- 박광온
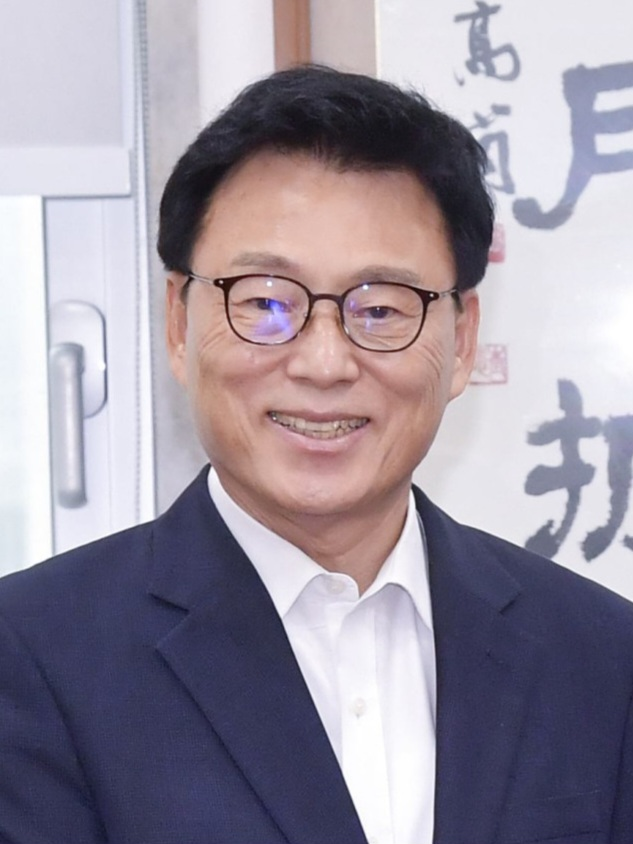
- Park in 2023

Floor Leader of the Democratic Party
- In office 28 April 2023 – 21 September 2023
- President: Lee Jae Myung
- Preceded by: Park Hong-keun
- Succeeded by: Song Gi-heon (acting); Hong Ihk-pyo

Secretary-General of the Democratic Party
- In office 31 August 2020 – 4 May 2021
- President: Lee Nak-yon
- Preceded by: Yun Ho-jung
- Succeeded by: Youn Kwan-suk

Member of the National Assembly
- In office 31 July 2014 – 29 May 2024
- Preceded by: Kim Jin-pyo
- Succeeded by: Kim Jun-hyeok
- Constituency: Suwon D (Gyeonggi)

Personal details
- Born: 25 April 1957 (age 69) Haenam, South Jeolla Province, South Korea
- Party: Democratic
- Other political affiliations: DUP (2011–2013); Democratic (2013–2014); NPAD (2014–2015)
- Education: Korea University; Dongguk University
- Occupation: Broadcaster, politician
- Religion: Roman Catholic(Christian Name : Ambrose)

Korean name
- Hangul: 박광온
- RR: Bak Gwangon
- MR: Pak Kwangon

Park Kwang-on (Korean: 박광온, born 25 April 1957) is a South Korean broadcaster and politician. He is the incumbent Member of the National Assembly for Suwon D constituency since 2014, as well as the former secretary-general of the ruling liberal Democratic Party from 2020 to 2021. He was one of the vice presidents of the party from 2018 to 2020. Before entering to politics, he worked at Munhwa Broadcasting Corporation (MBC) from 1984 to 2011.

== Biography ==
Park Kwang-on was born in Haenam, South Jeolla Province on 26 March 1957. Park holds a bachelor's degree in sociology from Korea University and a master's degree in communication sciences from Dongguk University. He entered to MBC in 1984 and served various positions, including correspondent, reporter, news reader and so on. He served as a correspondent in Tokyo from 1997 to 2000 and weekend news leader for MBC Newsdesk from 2000 to 2002. He also served as the MC of MBC 100 Minutes Debate from 2010 to 2011.

Park left MBC and entered to politics in 2011. Prior to the 2012 election, he contested DUP preselection for Haenam-Wando-Jindo constituency, but lost to the incumbent Kim Yung-rok. Instead, he became a spokesperson for Moon Jae-in, DUP's presidential candidate in 2012. He was selected as the NPAD candidate for Suwon 4th constituency at the 2014 by-election, after Kim Jin-pyo resigned in order to run as the governor of Gyeonggi. He defeated Lim Tae-hui of the then ruling Saenuri Party and subsequently became the NPAD's sole winner in Seoul Capital Area. He was re-elected in 2016. In August 2018, he ran as a vice presidential candidate of the Democratic Party and won as 2nd.

On 15 October 2018, Park and his Anti-Fake News Committee requested Google Korea to remove YouTube contents that include fake news related to Gwangju Uprising, President Moon Jae-in and so on. However, Google rejected their request, and added that "it's not easy to catch out which one is real and fake". The opposition Liberty Korea Party criticised their request as "media control".

On 31 August 2020, Park was appointed the new secretary-general of the Democratic Party, under the new President Lee Nak-yon.

Park Kwang-on was elected as the floor leader of the Democratic Party with the support of a majority of lawmakers in the first round of voting. Rep. Park Kwang-on is classified as a non-Lee Jae-myung faction that takes a neutral or critical stance against Lee Jae-myung. In September 2023, the Democratic Party-majority National Assembly passed a motion to remove the parliamentary immunity of Democratic Party leader, Lee Jae-myung, who is facing criminal charges of bribery and breach of duty. Park resigned for his failure to stop the motion.

== Election results ==
Year	Elections	Constituency	Political party	Votes (%)	Remarks
2014	2014 By-election	Suwon D (Gyeonggi)	NPAD	39,461 (52.67%)	Won
2016	20th General Election	Suwon D (Gyeonggi)	Democratic	52,209 (46.34%)	Won
2020	21st General Election	Suwon D (Gyeonggi)	Democratic	79,557 (57.42%)	Won
