= Park Ji-hyun =

Park Ji-hyun may refer to:

- Park Ji-hyun (basketball) (born 2000), South Korean basketball player
- Park Ji-hyun (politician) (born 1996), South Korean political activist
- Park Ji-hyun (actress) (born 1994), South Korean actress and model
- Park Ji-hyun (curler) (born 1979), South Korean curler
