= Goesan Pi clan =

Korean clan from North Chungcheong Province

- Country: Korea
- Current region: Goesan County
- Founder: Pi Gyeong jeong

Goesan Pi clan (Korean: 괴산 피씨; Hanja: 槐山 皮氏) was one of the Korean clans. Their Bon-gwan was in Goesan County, North Chungcheong Province. According to the research in 2000, the number of Goesan Pi clan was 2204. Their founder was Pi Gyeong jeong. He served as Jinzi Guanglu Daifu (Hanja: 金紫光祿大夫) in Yuan dynasty. He made Toghon Temür furious because he lost war. As a result, he exiled himself with his family. Goesan Pi clan was begun after Gongmin of Goryeo appointed Pi Gyeong jeong as Prince of Goesan (Hanja: 槐山君).

== See also ==
- Korean clan names of foreign origin
