= Democratic Party (South Korea, 2015) =

Political party in South Korea

Democratic Party of Korea
- Abbreviation: DPK; DP
- Leader: Kim Min-seok
- Founded: 26 March 2014; 12 years ago (as the New Politics Alliance for Democracy); 28 December 2015; 10 years ago (current form)
- Merger of: Democratic Party; New Politics Alliance... and others: Minjoo Party (merged on 19 October 2016); Platform Party (merged on 13 May 2020); Open Democratic Party (merged on 14 January 2022); New Wave (merged on 15 April 2022); Democratic Alliance of Korea (merged on 8 May 2024)
- Headquarters: 7, Gukhoe-daero 68-gil, Yeongdeungpo District, Seoul
- Think tank: The Institute for Democracy
- Youth wing: 청년 민주당 (Youth Democratic Party)
- Membership (2023): ▲5,129,314
- Ideology: Liberalism (Note: Attributed to multiple sources:) (South Korean)
- Political position: Centre (Note: Attributed to multiple sources:) to centre-left (Note: Attributed to multiple sources:)
- International affiliation: Progressive Alliance
- Satellite party: Platform Party (2020)
- Electoral alliance: Democratic Alliance of Korea (2024)
- Colours: Blue (primary) (Note: Historically (sea blue) as the New Politics Alliance for Democracy); Purple; Teal
- Slogan: 당원과 함께, 국민과 함께, 새로운 대한민국 ('Together with the party, together with the people, a new Republic of Korea')
- National Assembly: 161 / 300
- Metropolitan mayors and governors: 12 / 16
- Municipal mayors: 119 / 227
- Provincial and metropolitan councillors: 588 / 933
- Municipal councillors: 1,569 / 3,034

Party flag

Website
- theminjoo.kr

- Democratic Party
- Hangul: 더불어민주당
- Hanja: 더불어民主黨
- RR: Deobureo minjudang
- MR: Tŏburŏ minjudang

New Politics Alliance for Democracy
- Hangul: 새정치민주연합
- Hanja: 새政治民主聯合
- RR: Sae jeongchi minju yeonhap
- MR: Sae chŏngch'i minju yŏnhap

The Democratic Party of Korea (DPK or DP; Korean: 더불어민주당, lit. 'Together Democratic Party') is a liberal political party in South Korea. The DPK and its rival, the People Power Party (PPP), form the two major political parties of South Korea. Since the 2025 presidential election, it is the ruling party, having held a majority in the National Assembly since 2020.

The Democratic Party was founded as the New Politics Alliance for Democracy (NPAD) on 26 March 2014 as a merger between the previous Democratic Party and the preparatory committee of the New Political Vision Party (NPVP) led by Ahn Cheol-soo. The party changed its name to the current name on 28 December 2015. In the 2016 legislative election, the party won a plurality of seats in the National Assembly, becoming the largest party in the National Assembly. In 2017, the Democratic Party presidential candidate Moon Jae-in was elected as the president of South Korea. In 2020, the party won an absolute majority of seats in the National Assembly. In 2022, the Democratic Party presidential candidate Lee Jae Myung lost the election to PPP candidate Yoon Suk Yeol. Later that year, the Democratic Party, Open Democratic Party, and New Wave merged to form a big tent party. The party retained its majority in the 2024 legislative election. In 2025, after the impeachment of Yoon Suk Yeol, the Democratic Party presidential candidate Lee Jae Myung was elected as the president of South Korea.

The party is seen as liberal and centre to centre-left. It has liberal, centrist and conservative factions; Lee Jae Myung is considered belonging to the liberal faction. It is seen as socially liberal, though espousing some socially conservative positions. It generally supports market economics, though also favoring an increase in welfare spending and economic interventionism. It favors maintaining South Korea's military alliance with the United States, though also favoring autonomy. Regarding North Korea, the Democratic Party favors peaceful relations and greater engagement.

== History ==
=== Formation and Ahn–Kim leadership (March–July 2014) ===
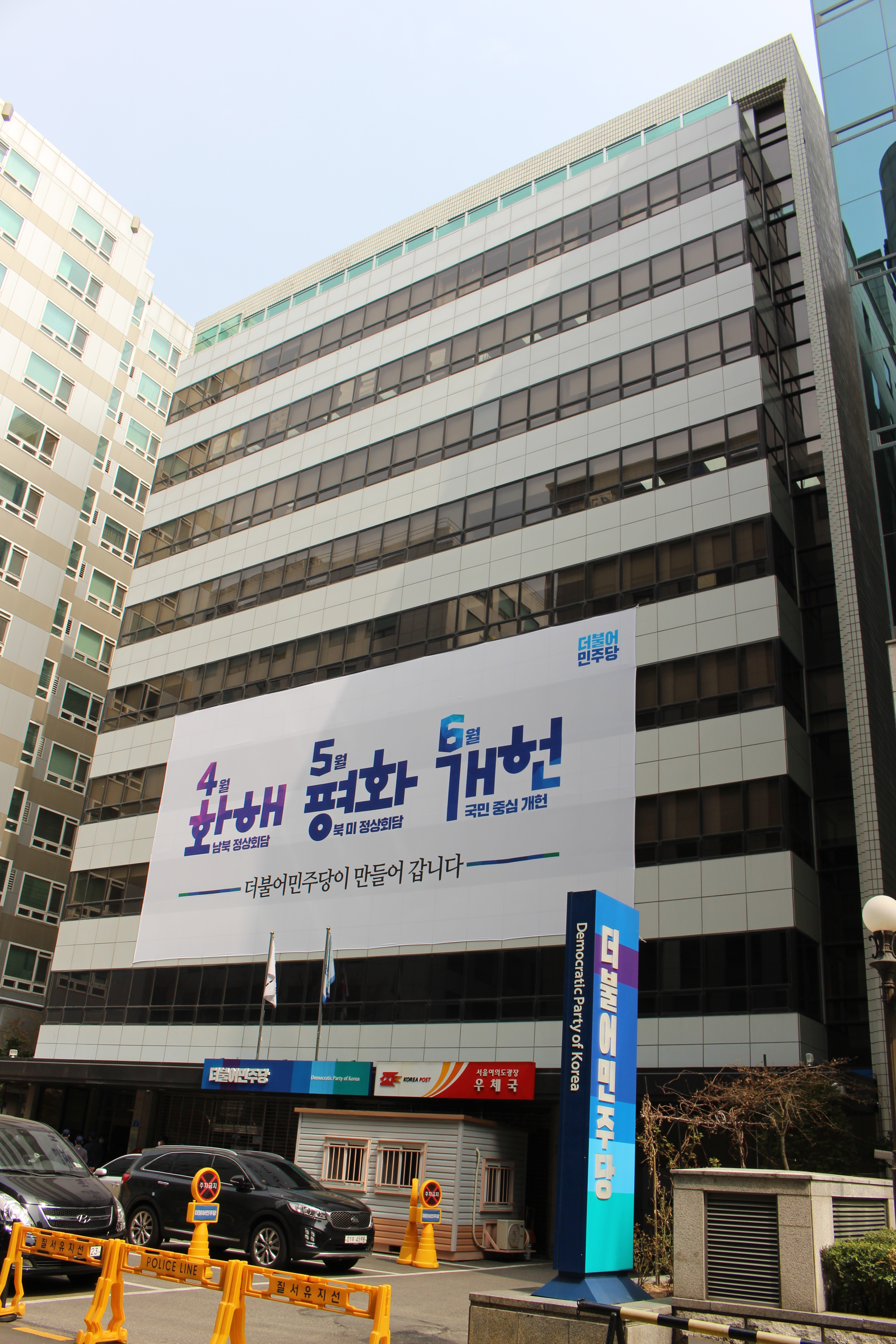
Headquarters of the Democratic Party

On 26 March 2014, the New Politics Alliance for Democracy (NPAD; 새정치민주연합) was founded after an independent group led by Ahn Cheol-soo, in the process of forming the New Political Vision Party, merged with the Democratic Party led by Kim Han-gil. As a result, the former Democratic Party was absorbed into the NPAD and the preparatory committee of the NPVP was dissolved. Ahn and Kim jointly assumed leadership of the party as co-leaders. When the party performed poorly in by-elections that July, both leaders stepped down. The leadership of the party was then assumed by an emergency committee.

=== Ahn–Moon split (2015–2016) ===
On 7 February 2015, a party convention elected Moon Jae-in as the new leader of the party. Moon, who had previously served as chief of staff for former president Roh Moo-hyun, was the leader of the party's "pro-Roh" faction, opposed to Ahn and Kim. Moon came under fire for imposing a "pro-Roh hegemony" in the party, as Ahn and Kim were jeered and harassed at a memorial service for Roh held in May 2015.

As the factional conflict intensified, the party lost support, falling from around 40 to 30 percent in opinion polls. A survey conducted on 12–14 November 2015, showed that supporters of the party wanted Ahn and Seoul mayor Park Won-soon to assume the leadership alongside Moon. On 29 November, Ahn rejected a proposal from Moon to establish joint leadership and presented Moon with a demand to call a convention to elect a new party leader. Moon rejected his demand, and Ahn left the party.

Ahn was followed by a number of NPAD assembly members, including his former co-leader Kim Han-gil and Kwon Rho-kap, a former aide of President Kim Dae-jung from the party's stronghold of Honam. Ahn and Kim merged their groups with that of another defector from the NPAD, Chun Jung-bae, to form the People Party.

Following the defections, the NPAD was renamed the Democratic Party on 28 December 2015, and Moon resigned as party leader on 27 January 2016. Subsequently, Kim Chong-in, an academic and former assemblyman who served as an economic advisor to President Park Geun-hye, was appointed party leader. Kim was viewed as an unexpected choice, as he had previously worked for the conservative Chun Doo-hwan and Roh Tae-woo administrations in the 1980s, serving as an assembly member for the ruling Democratic Justice Party and as health and welfare minister.

=== Opposition (2016–2017) ===
Kim Chong-in viewed the pro–Roh Moo-hyun faction and what he considered the extremist wing of the party as responsible for the party's troubles and pledged to diminish their influence.

In the lead-up to the 2016 legislative election, he deselected Lee Hae-chan, who had been Prime Minister under Roh and was now chairman of the Roh Moo-hyun Foundation, as a candidate. Lee left the party in response. Many of Kim's nominations for the party's list were rejected by the rest of the party leadership, while favored candidates of Moon were ranked near the top of the approved list. Kim offered to resign in March but stayed on as leader after a visit from Moon. Kim stated that he would continue to attempt to change the party's image, saying that the events had shown the party was "still unable to move on from its old ways".

Though losing votes to the People's Party formed by Ahn, Chun, and Kim Han-gil—particularly in Honam—the party emerged as the overall winner of the election, receiving a plurality of seats (123 seats) in the National Assembly with a margin of one seat over the Saenuri Party. Lee Hae-chan returned to the Assembly as an independent, representing Sejong City. Following its electoral victory, Kim announced that the Democratic Party would shift its focus from welfare to economic growth and structural reform. Kim stated that the party would also change its position to support the establishment of for-profit hospitals, in contrast to the party's earlier opposition to the policy.

After the constitutional court impeached President Park Geun-hye for bribery, the Democratic Party's Moon Jae-in won the presidential election with 41.1% of the vote, with Hong Joon-pyo of the Liberty Korea Party coming in second with 24%.

=== Government (2017–2022) ===
On 15 April 2020, the Democratic Party and its allies won an absolute majority with 180 seats in the 300-member National Assembly in the legislative election. The main opposition United Future Party won 103 seats.

On 9 March 2021, Lee Nak-yon resigned as the leader of the Democratic Party to run for president in the 2022 South Korean presidential election. Following major losses in the 2021 by-elections, the party leadership was reorganized. Do Jong-hwan became the interim party leader. In October 2021, the Democratic Party nominated Lee Jae Myung as its nominee in the 2022 presidential election over other contenders such as former Democratic Party leaders Lee Nak-yon and Choo Mi-ae. Lee ultimately lost the election with 47.83% of the vote.

In April 2022, the Democratic Party, Open Democratic Party, and New Wave merged to form a big tent party.

=== Opposition (2022–2025) ===
After a brief non-captain system, Lee Jae Myung was elected as the party representative with 77.7% of the vote. At the time of his election, Lee had been under investigation by South Korea's Supreme Prosecutor's Office for alleged wrongdoings during his tenure as Mayor of Seongnam. As a result of the investigation, the Supreme Prosecutor's Office issued an arrest warrant for Lee on 16 February 2023 over allegations of corruption and bribery. A motion to arrest the Lee was held in the National Assembly on 21 February 21 but was rejected by a narrow margin. Conflict arose between the pro–Lee Jae-myung faction and anti-Lee Jae-myung faction over the arrest motion. The pro–Lee Jae-myung faction argued that the party leader won nearly 80% of the party's vote and that the party's supporters overwhelmingly support the rejection of the arrest motion. The anti-Lee Jae-myung and moderate faction lawmakers insisted that affairs of the party and individual affairs of the party leader must be separated, arguing that the party's overall approval rating was falling because of the party's representative. A hardline pro–Lee Jae-myung fringe group within the Democratic Party known as the "Gaeddal" (개딸) short for (개혁의 딸들, meaning "daughters of the reformation"), pressured lawmakers who seemed to agree to the motion for Lee Jae-myung's arrest to oppose the motion. Regarding this, party leader Lee Jae-myung requested the Gaeddal refrain from pressuring lawmakers.

Park Kwang-on was elected as the floor leader of the Democratic Party with the support of a majority of lawmakers in the first round of voting. Rep. Park Kwang-on is classified as a member of the anti-Lee Jae-myung faction, often taking a neutral or critical stance against Lee Jae-myung. Rep. Kim Nam-guk withdrew from the party due to a controversy over possession of virtual currency. Rep. Kim is considered a pro–Lee Jae-myung member and the incident has dealt a blow to the leadership of the party representative.

The party attempted to appoint Lee Rae-kyung, a left-wing nationalist, as the chairperson of the party's Innovation Committee, but withdrew the appointment due to staunch opposition from internal moderates and external opposition. Kim Eun-kyung was instead chosen for the position. She was criticized by moderates in the party for her favorable attitude towards Lee Rae-kyung.

A second motion to arrest the party leader was issued on 22 September, and passed the National Assembly with 149 members voting in favor of Lee Jae-myung's arrest and 136 members opposing it. Initially, it was predicted that the motion for arrest would be rejected but more than 30 members within the Democratic Party agreed to the arrest motion, highlighting the party's intensifying divide between pro and anti-Lee Jae-myung factions. The pro–Lee Jae-myung faction criticized the anti-Lee Jae-myung faction for colluding with prosecutors supportive of the Yoon Seok-yeol government to push ahead with the motion's passage despite most of the party's supporters being opposed to it. Members of the moderate and anti-Lee factions criticized Lee Jae-myung and urged for him to resign as party leader. A public opinion poll later revealed that 44.6% of respondents agreed with the passage of the arrest motion, while 45.1% of respondents opposed it. When limited to Democratic Party supporters, 83.2% opposed the passage of the arrest motion. Afterwards, numerous key party officials resigned in order to reorganize the party. On 23 September 2023, Lee Jae-myung broke his fast that had lasted for 24 days, which he had started to demand a government reforms and the resignation of the entire cabinet.

Rep. Hong Ihk-pyo was elected as the party's new floor leader on 26 September 2023. Hong, belonging to the party's moderate faction won the support of the pro and anti-Lee Jae-myung factions. Other key party positions were won by members of the pro–Lee Jae-myung faction, while the anti-Lee Jae-myung remained critical of Lee's leadership. In October 2023, the Democratic Party won the by-election for the mayor of Gangseo District, Seoul defeating People Power Party candidate Kim Tae-woo. The party's candidate Jin Kyo-hoon was elected with 56.52% of vote, while the People Power Party candidate Kim Tae-woo came in second place with 39.37% of the vote. The party received support from Basic Income Party, Social Democratic Party, and the Minsaeng Party. On 3 December 2023, representative Lee Sang-min, who was critical of Lee Jae-myung, left the party, citing it increasingly becoming a one-man show dominated by Lee.

During the primary, many people critical of representative Lee Jae-myung were eliminated, creating controversy. During this process, key party officials who were not nominated left the party. Among them were key figures such as the former floor leader and vice-chairman of the National Assembly. They left the party and joined the New Future Party, led by former leader Lee Nak-yeon, or the People Power Party. On 27 April 2025, Lee Jae-myung was nominated as the Democratic Party's candidate for South Korea's snap presidential election on 3 June 2025, following President Yoon Suk Yeol's impeachment and Lee's 9 April resignation as party chair. Leading in the polls, Lee vowed to restore democracy, boost defense, and strengthen the economy, despite facing ongoing legal challenges.

=== Government (2025–present) ===
After Lee's resignation, Moon Jae-in loyalist Park Chan-dae assumed the acting chairmanship of the Party. Over a month later, Lee won the presidency of South Korea, leading a unified government with the Democratic Party's legislative majority. On 13 June, Park resigned and handed over the acting chairmanship of the party to Lee loyalist Kim Byung-kee in order to run for the full chairmanship. A month later the party faced an internal divide surrounding Lee's nomination for Minister for Gender Equality of Kang Sun-woo, causing her withdrawal. On 2 August 2025, Jung Chung-rae, a Lee loyalist and anti-conservative hardliner, won the full chairmanship of the Democratic Party, beating Park.

Both the Democratic Party and the People Power Party (PPP) are embroiled in a political scandal involving allegations of receiving illegal political funds and donations from the Unification Church (sometimes informally called Moonies).

On 30 December 2025, Kim Byung-kee resigned from his position as the floor leader of the Democratic Party amid a series of allegations involving him and his family, such as the allegation of preferential treatment, using free accommodation provided by Korean Air in the past and other misconduct involving his family. In the wake of Kim's resignation, Moon Jin-seok, who is closely tied to Jung Chung-rae, was appointed as acting floor leader until the leadership by-election on 11 January.

On 11 January 2026, the party elected Han Byung-do as the new floor leader for the remainder of Kim Byung-kee's term, which was supposed to end in June. At the same time, they elected Kang Deuk-gu, Lee Sung-yoon and Moon Jeong-bog as the party's new Supreme Council members.

The party made strong gains in the 2026 local elections, including in Busan, but failed to make a breakthrough in Seoul.

Following the local elections, the party began preparations for its national convention. Competing for the party chairmanship are Kim Min-seok, who emphasizes cooperation with President Lee Jae Myung, and the incumbent Jung Chung-rae, who advocates for a clear-cut reformist stance.

== Ideology ==
The Democratic Party is primarily described as a centrist party. However, the party is also described as centre-left because it is the main liberal opponent to the conservative People Power Party.

The Democratic Party is seen as the mainstream centre-left option in Korea. Due to the nature of South Korea's electoral system, minor parties rarely win seats in elections, leading most progressive voters to vote for the Democratic Party through tactical voting. For this reason, the Democratic Party is sometimes treated as a "progressive" or "left-leaning" party when compared to the conservative, right-leaning People Power Party. In addition, some conservative-leaning politicians criticize the progressive wing of the Democratic Party by labelling them as "leftist extremists." The Chosun Ilbo, JoongAng Ilbo, and The Dong-A Ilbo (collectively known as Chojoongdong) have also criticized the Democratic Party as being leftist/left-wing. Currently, major politicians of the right-wing People Power Party also criticize the Democratic Party's policies as "leftist policies that ruin the country" and being "socialist." It is also becoming increasingly prevalent for the Democratic Party to be referred to as left leaning, (Note: Attributed to multiple sources:) with many news stations now marking the party as a prominent progressive figure.

However, some researchers argue that the Democratic Party has centre-right policies by international standards. It was evaluated that the Democratic Party is considered progressive within Korea despite not being progressive by international standards because Korea has a more conservative political landscape compared to other industrialized democracies (mainly belonging to OECD). (Note: In South Korea, hard-right authoritarianism and military dictatorships were in power for almost 50 years after liberation. During this time, leftist/progressive ideologies were considered illegal. Because of this, some researchers argue that the DPK is considered center-left/moderate-progressive in South Korea because it has a progressive political form, even though it is substantially similar to the center-right/moderate conservative camp in Western Europe.) Some researchers have placed the DPK's position on the political spectrum to the right of Christian democracy, saying that the DPK is "more [socially] conservative than the centre-right German Christian Democratic Union of Germany (CDU)" in particular. The Democratic Party's LGBT+ policy is more conservative than CDU. Because of this, some left-leaning researchers have placed the party more right-wing than Western European conservative parties. Also, many members of the Democratic Party, such as Lee Hae-chan, Moon Jae-in, and Lee Jae Myung, define the party's de facto identity as 'true conservative', 'moderate conservative' or 'centre-right'. In his book titled 1219 The End Is Beginning, Moon Jae-in writes, "it is only a backward political reality unique to South Korea that political forces which are centre-right in nature are attacked for being left-wing."

=== Leadership ideology changes ===
The ideology of the Democratic Party has gone through changes depending on its leadership. In the party's early days, moderate and conservative-leaning leadership were mainstream, but as a result of progressives and conservatives competing for leadership, the party has gradually moved in a progressive direction.

During the early days of the New Politics Alliance for Democracy, co-leaders Kim Han-gil and Ahn Cheol-soo took a tough stance on relations with North Korea and pursued harmony between selective welfare and universal welfare. As moderates, they faced criticism from progressives inside the party for being 'centre-right', leading some progressive members to withdraw from the party. After the party's defeat in the 2014 South Korean by-elections, Kim and Ahn resigned as party leaders. Kim Han-gil and Ahn Cheol-soo joined the right-wing People Power Party in 2022.

After Kim and Han's resignation, moderates Park Young-sun and Moon Hee-sang assumed party leadership through an emergency committee. Later, in the 2015 party leadership election, liberal Moon Jae-in won over moderate Park Jie-won. Moon resigned as leader shortly before the 2016 South Korean legislative election, due to factional conflict and continuous losses in by-elections. He was succeeded by an emergency committee led by conservative economist Kim Chong-in.

Afterwards, liberals Choo Mi-ae and Lee Hae-chan served as party leader. Lee Hae-chan suggested the party move in a progressive direction, claiming that the party is not a progressive party by international standards, and its policies are much more conservative than those of reformist parties in Europe, labelling the Democratic Party "centre-right".

After that, moderates such as Lee Nak-yon and Kim Tae-nyeon held the party leadership. However, after the progressive Lee Jae Myung was elected as the party's leader, the party moved in a more progressive direction, to the dismay of the moderate and conservative factions.

== Factions ==
The Democratic Party is a big tent party, with ideological factions spanning from centre-left to centre-right on the political spectrum.

As of March 2024, the party's mainstream is dominated by the liberal and progressive pro–Lee Jae Myung faction. The once influential pro–Lee Nak-yon faction has de facto moved to the New Future Party. They were joined by members of the anti–Lee Jae Myung faction Hong Young-pyo and Sul Hoon, who quit the Democratic Party, citing their opposition to Lee Jae-myung. Although its influence has been reduced from years past, there is also a social conservative and economic liberal faction centered on National Assembly Speaker Kim Jin-pyo.

=== Liberals ===
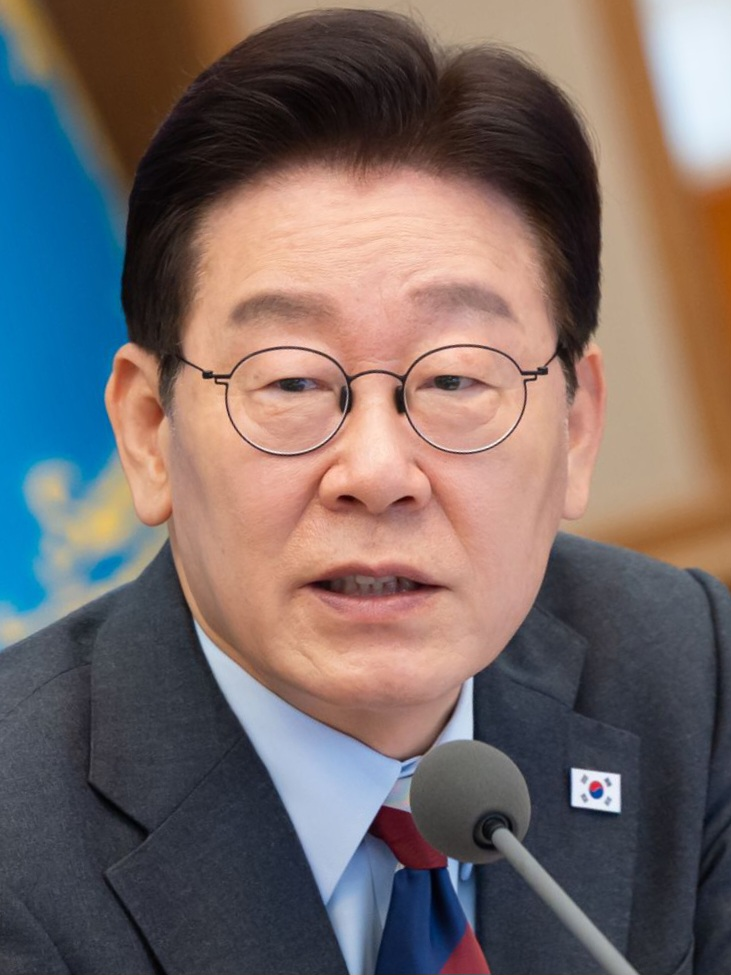
Lee Jae Myung, 14th President of South Korea and Leader of the Democratic Party (2022–2025)

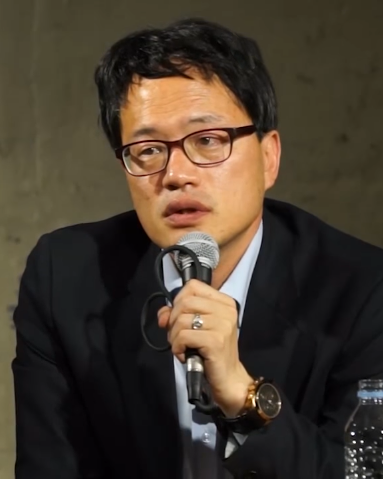
Park Joo-min, member of the National Assembly

Social liberal populists (Note: It influenced by Lee Jae-myung who is known as a "liberal" or "left-liberal" politician. Whether Lee can be viewed as a "left-wing" or "left-wing populist" is debatable. Lee himself argues that he is not "left-wing" (좌파 or 좌익), but rather more "conservative" (보수). Lee described himself as a "pro-business" (친기업) who supports the promotion of workers' rights but does not support policies that are too hostile to businesses, and Lee is also staunch supporter of free trade (자유무역).) support centre-left, progressive policies including New Deal-like policies. The faction enjoys high support from general party members, but there is less support among the party's National Assembly members. The faction is centered around Lee Jae-myung and often referred to as the "pro-Myung" faction.

When Lee Jae-myung initially entered politics, he was called "Korea's Bernie Sanders" and was considered an anti-establishment alternative to the moderate Democratic Party. Jacobin magazine referred to Representative Lee Jae-myung as a progressive in 2017. But after 2022, he is mainly described as a liberal and has rolled back some of his pledges that were criticized in the past as radical.

When the "pro–Lee Jae-myung" faction started out as a minority faction in 2017, its base of support was mainly in Seongnam. He ran a 'labor law firm' that helped defend workers in Seongnam. While serving as the Mayor of Seongnam, he implemented radical progressive policies such as providing universal basic income for young people, free school uniforms, and expanding social welfare programs such as free postpartum care. At the time, his faction included moderate social democrats like Eun Soo-mi, and others from South Korean socialist groups, such as the former South Korean Socialist Workers' Alliance.

However, during the 2022 presidential election, he advocated for economically liberal policies such as real estate deregulation, acquisition tax relief and pro-business arguments. This trend intensified during the 2022 presidential election campaign, when Lee emphasized "centrism and civic integration". During the presidential campaign, Lee spent much time meeting and gaining support from centrists and conservatives. The party emphasized "economic growth" throughout the election campaign. Some columnists of Hankyoreh reported Lee Jae-myung as saying, "I should have shouted for reform and change, not pragmatism and integration," revealing his regret for turning to a more moderate stance. Lee was also criticized for leaving behind his (liberal/progressive) "values" to win the votes of conservative voters. Lee became more centrist as he won the 2025 presidential election.

=== Centrist reformists ===
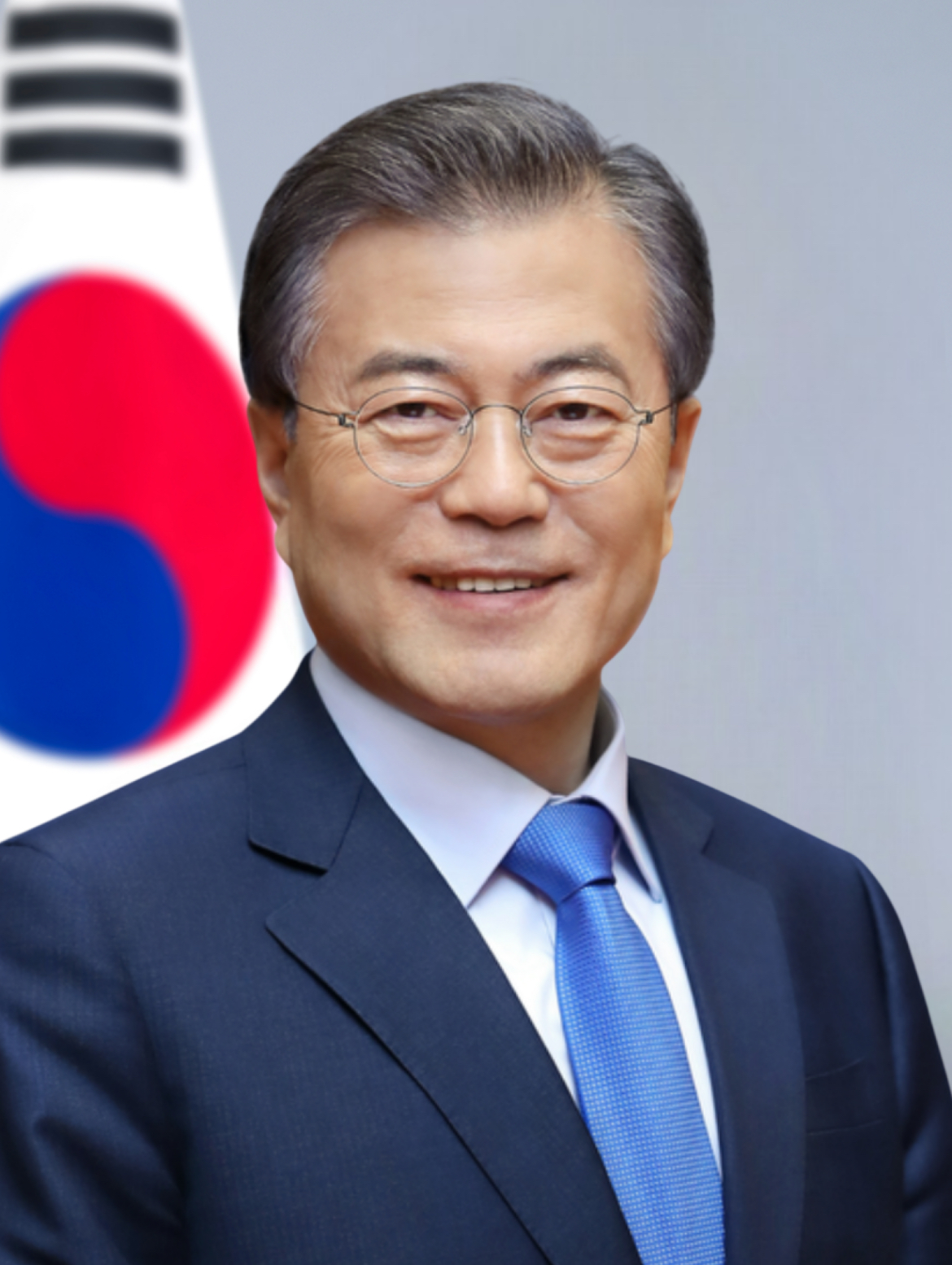
Moon Jae-in, 12th President of South Korea and former Leader of the Democratic Party (2015–2016)

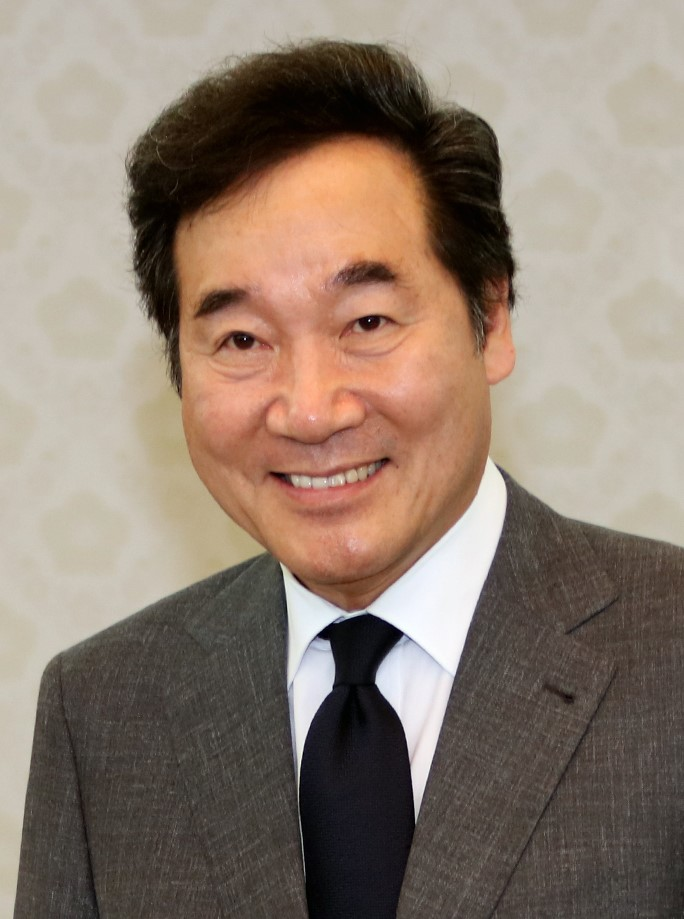
Lee Nak-yon, former Prime Minister and former leader of the Democratic Party

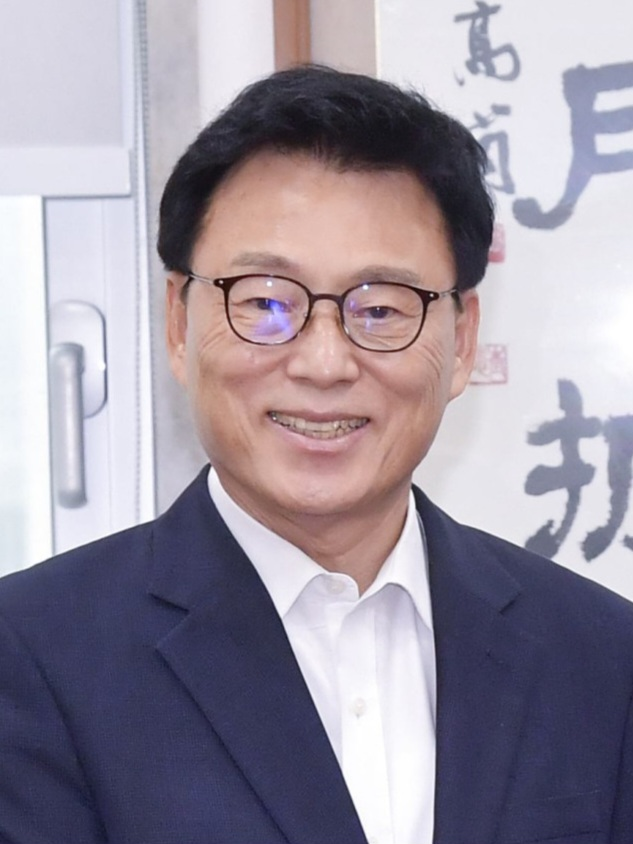
Park Kwang-on former Democratic Party floor leader

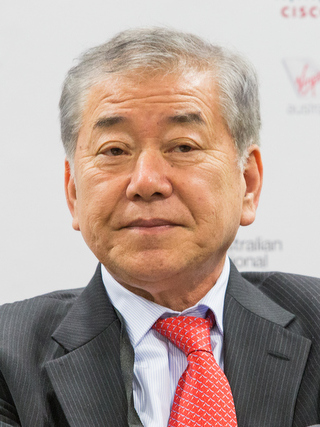
Moon Chung-in, former special advisor of Foreign Affairs and National Security

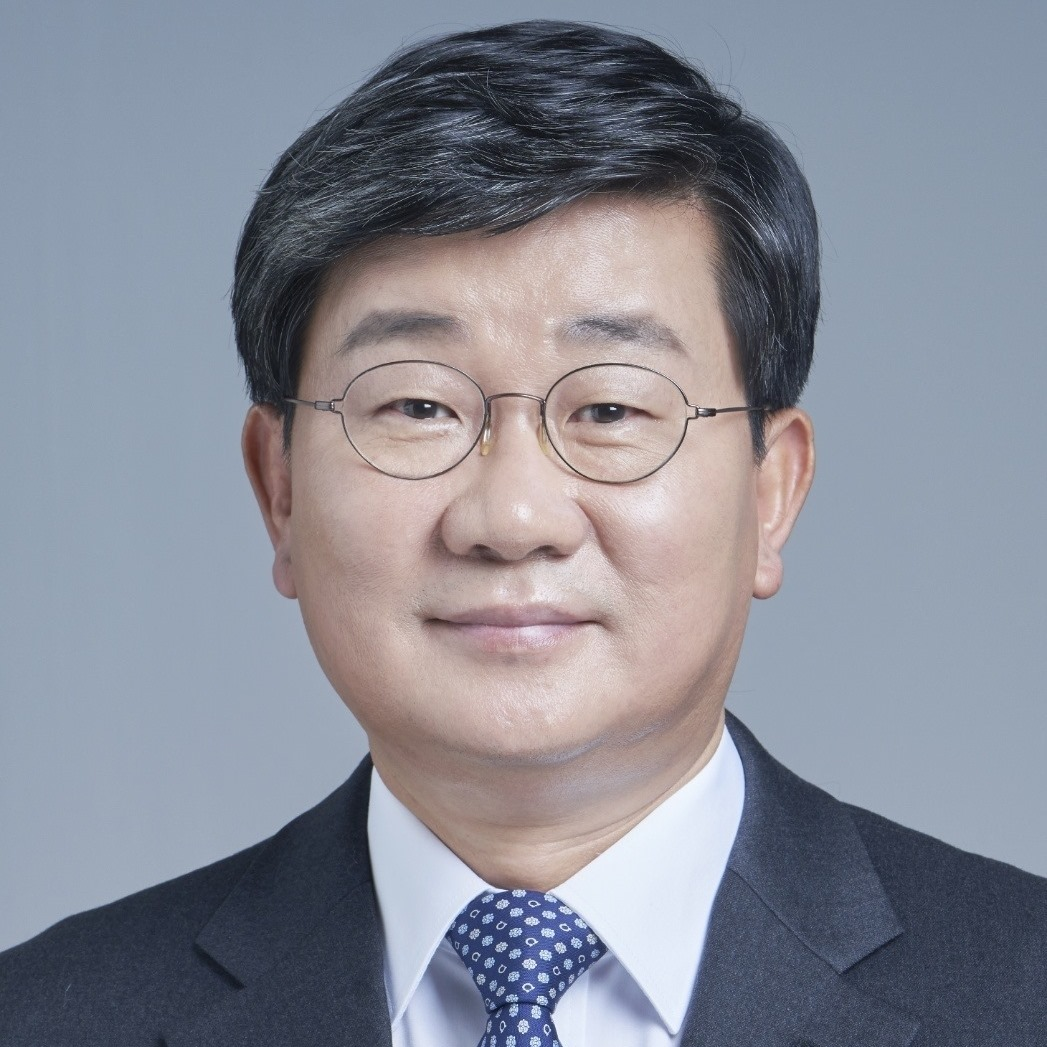
Jeon Hae-cheol former Minister of the Interior and Safety.

Centrist reformism has historically dominated the Democratic Party and its policies. The centrist reformist faction historically originated from the Donggyo-dong faction which was centered around President Kim Dae-jung. The party's moderate reformists mainly belonged to the pro-Moon faction, with a minority of members belonging to pro–Lee Nak-yeon and pro–Chung Sye-kyun factions. However, compared to the pro–Moon Jae-in faction, they are economically liberal and slightly more conservative. In particular, the pro–Lee Nak-yon faction embraced economically liberal measures and drew support from the conservative wing of the party.

The former president, Moon Jae-in has been described as liberal and centrist reformist. His government has been described by several experts as a "centrist-liberal government" while taking a culturally liberal approach to military reform, school reform, and environmental issues, but a somewhat moderate socially conservative approach to disability rights and LGBT rights. He also implemented reformative economic policies like implementing the 52-hour workweek, increasing the minimum wage, and regulating the housing market. Lee Nak-yon, former Prime Minister under Moon administration, pledged to continue Moon's policies, proposing "New Welfare System," which would upgrade and expand South Korea's social safety net. During his campaign for party leader, Lee Nak-yon gained support of some pro-Moon Assembly members.

As of March 2024, the influence of centrist reformists have decreased as some members centered around Lee Nak-yon, including Lee himself left the Democratic Party to establish the New Future Party.

=== Conservatives ===
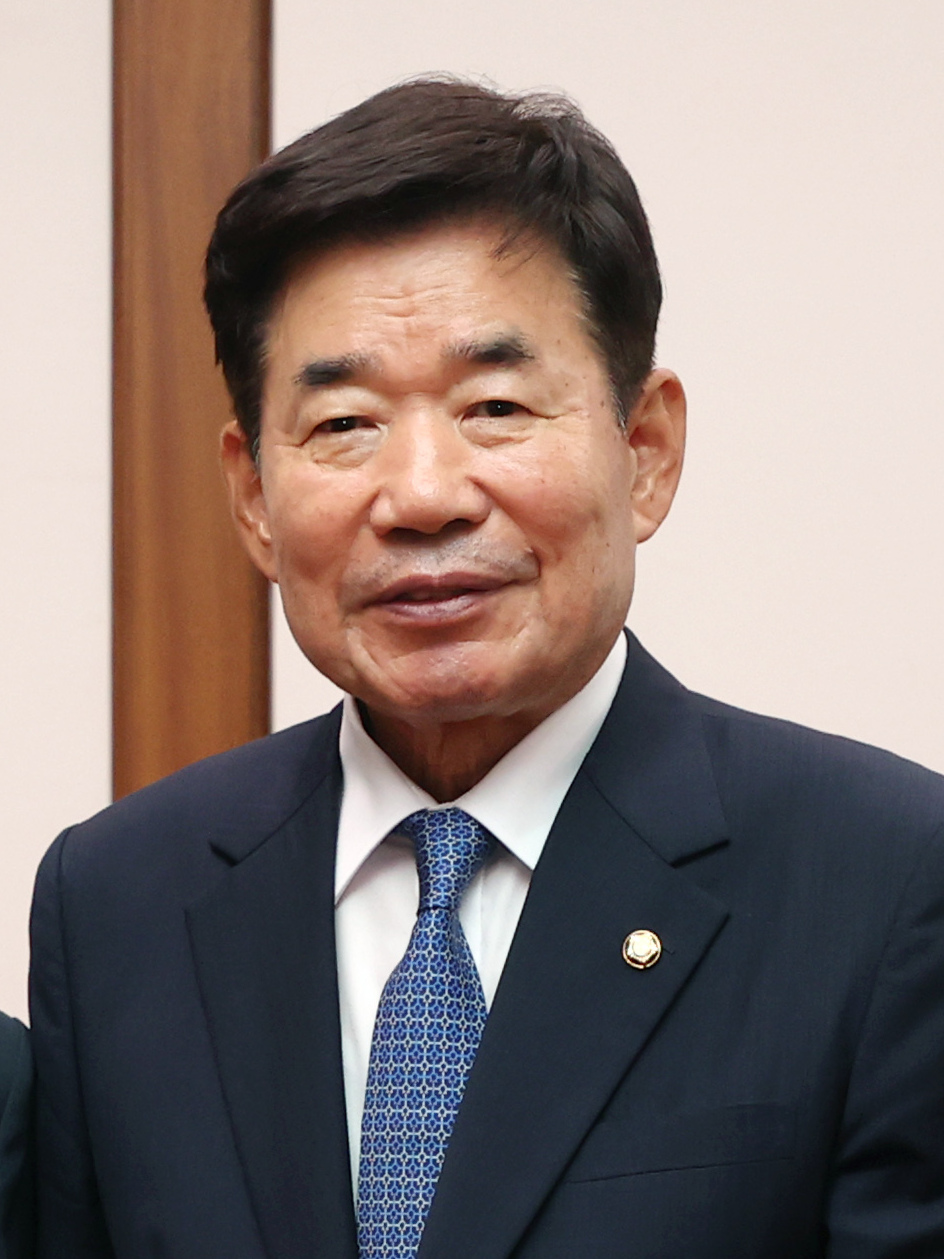
Kim Jin-pyo, former Speaker of the National Assembly

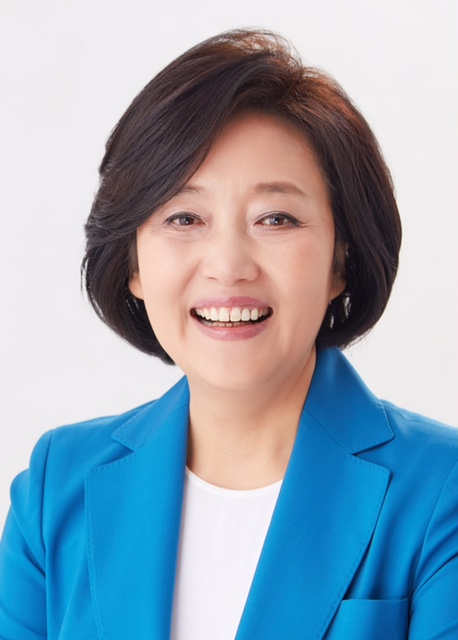
Park Young-sun, former party leader

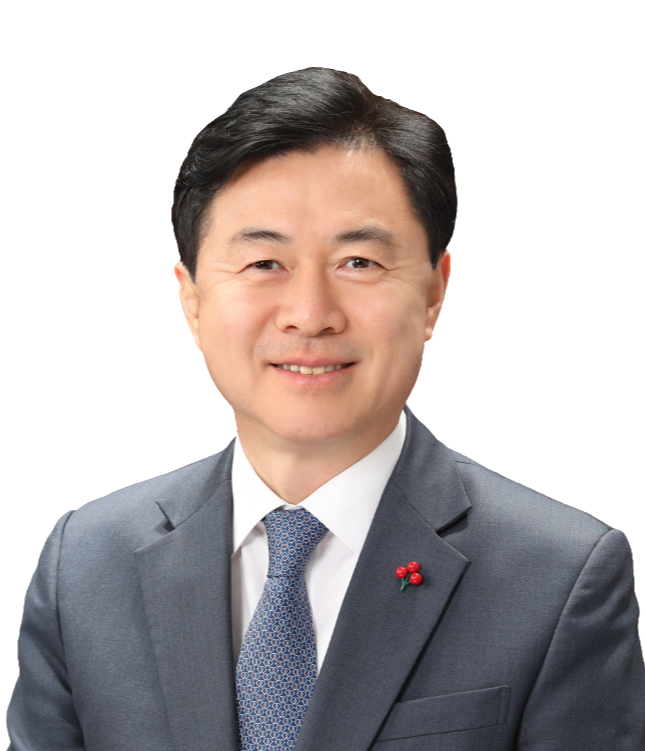
Kim Young-choon, former member of the National Assembly

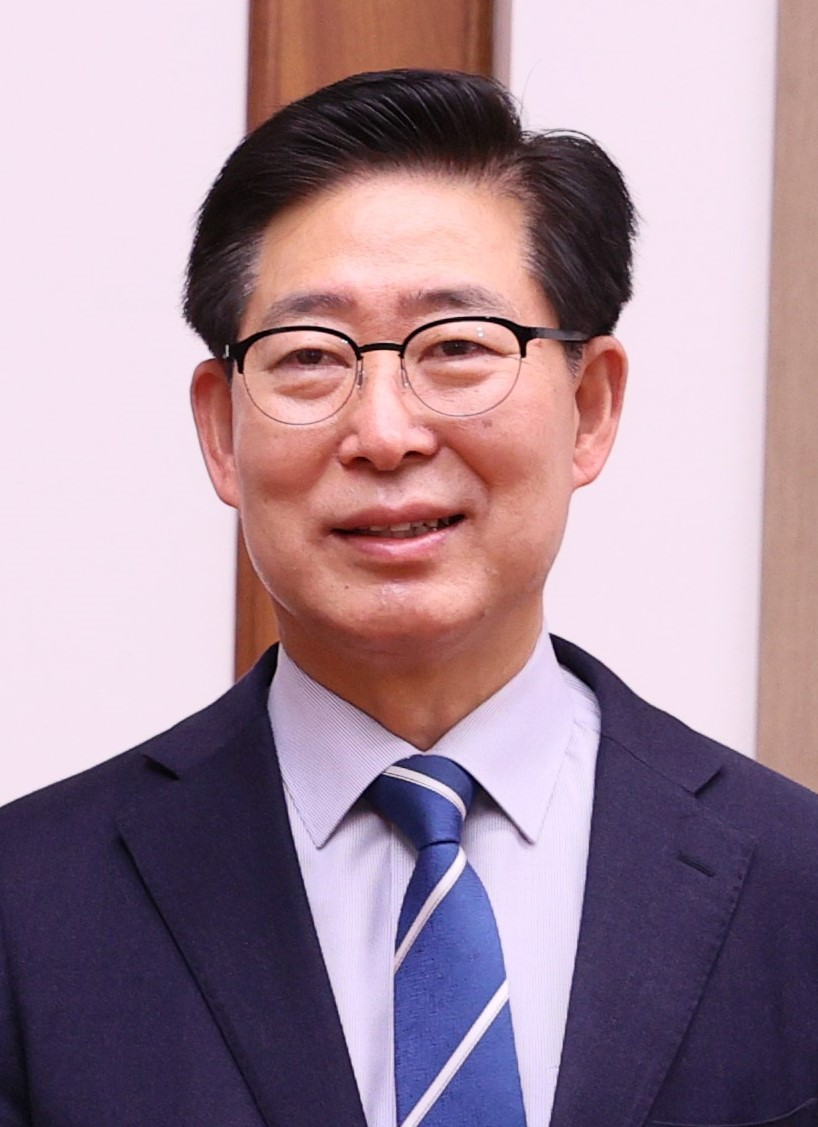
Yang Seung-jo, Chungcheong Governor

Conservatives like Kim Jin-pyo display socially conservative attitudes on abortion and LGBT+ rights but support economically liberal policies such as the deregulation of real estate. A survey conducted by the Maeil Business Newspaper which evaluated members of the National Assembly based on their voting records concluded that Kim Jin-pyo was closer to being conservative than centrist. Kim introduced the "Homosexuality Healing Movement" as one of several proposed countermeasures against South Korea's low birth rate, which aimed to "convert" LGBT+ people to being heterosexual. Despite his conservative tendencies, Kim won the support of a majority of lawmakers in the election for speaker of the National Assembly.

In addition, there are Christian democrats within the party, such as former assembly member Park Young-sun. Park had claimed in an interview that "I was the strongest opponent of the 300 members of the National Assembly in the past on homosexuality". In 2021, she turned to a more moderate conservative stance, saying she supports a more moderate form of anti-discrimination law that factors in "religious exceptions". Park remains skeptical about holding queer parades.

Moderate conservatives such as Kim Young-choon, Kim Boo-kyum, and Yang Seung-jo who defected from mainstream conservative parties make up an extreme minority within the party. Within the Democratic Party, they take a relatively conservative stance, such as opposing reformist bills that include installing CCTVs in operating rooms.

Conservatives in the Democratic Party are politically opposed to the new liberal and progressive faction centered around Lee Jae-myung Whenever disputes between the factions arise, Democratic Party conservatives demand that the pro-Lee faction voluntarily leave the party, or insist that the party can split.

=== Minorities ===
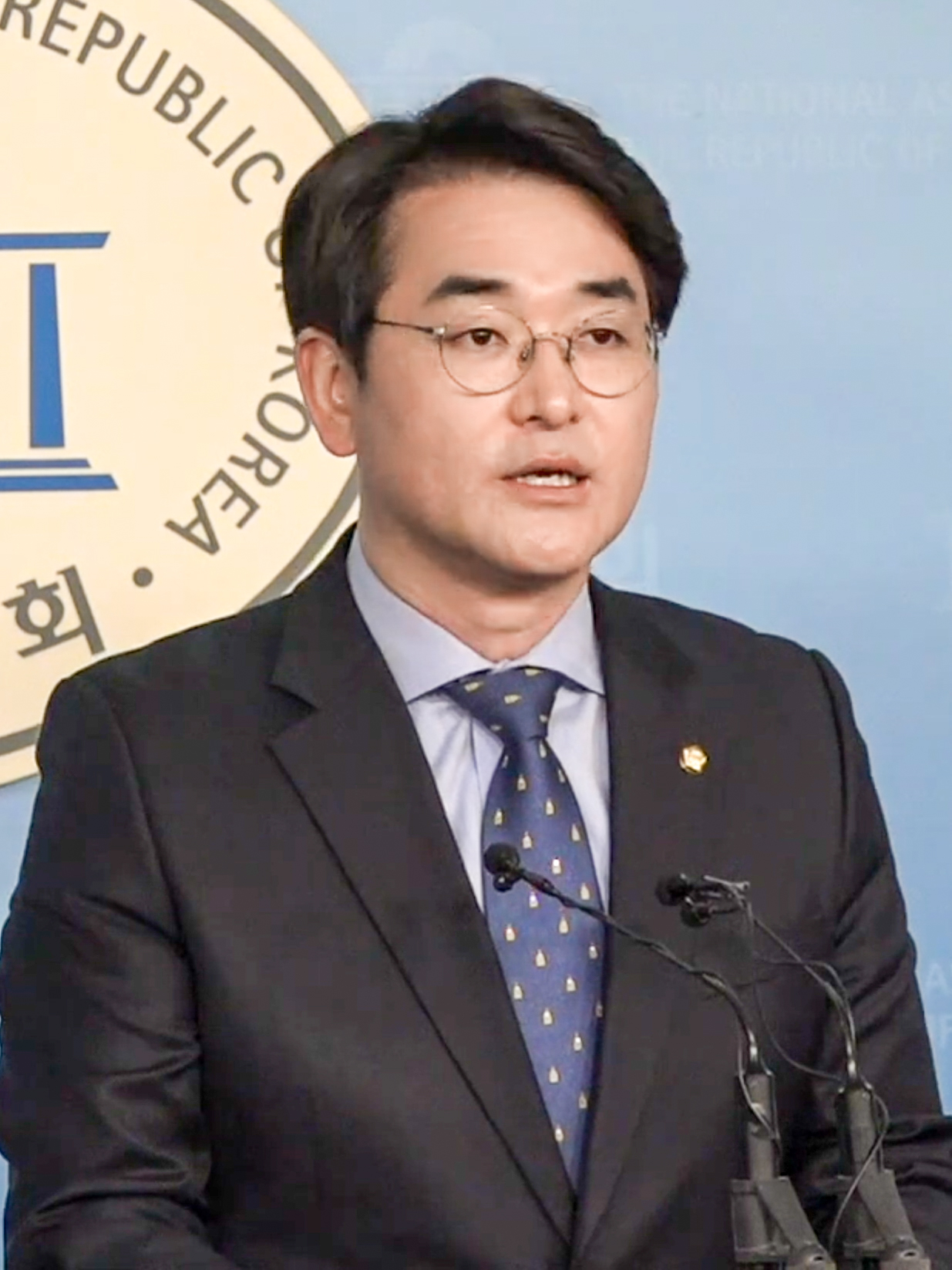
Park Yong-jin, member of the National Assembly

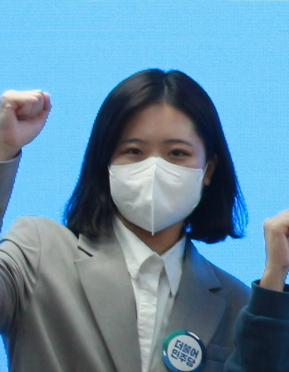
Park Ji-hyun, former co-chair of the election committee

There are several political minorities in the Democratic Party. They take a critical stance towards the party's mainstream and elite, though with little ideological coherence.

Liberals like Park Ji-hyun support the rights of immigrants, and adhere to liberal feminism and cultural liberalism. Although they are liberals, they oppose populism and are socially liberal to progressive, leading to frequent conflict with the party's pro–Lee Jae-myung faction. Regarding the arrest motion of Lee Jae-myung, she strongly criticized party leader Lee Jae-myung, saying that his arrest motion and previous investigations by the Prosecutor's Office were the cause of the party's decline in approval ratings. She has criticized the US Supreme Court's decision to revoke the federal right to abortion and is an open supporter of abortion rights.

People from the left-wing progressive Democratic Labor Party, such as assemblyman Park Yong-jin, voted against the Democratic Party's 2023 budget plan, labelling it a "tax cut for the rich." However, Park also insisted on reducing corporate tax, sparking criticism from within the party.

== Political stances ==
=== Economic and labour policies ===
The Democratic Party supports the expansion of fiscal expenditures to gradually increase welfare alongside elements of economic liberalism (Note: DPK supports the market economy and includes a large number of people who show economic liberalism such as deregulation. This tendency is particularly evident in the party's conservative faction.) and fiscal conservatism. The party supports the market economy, but also values the need for state intervention in the market. In 2020, the party pledged to implement a version of the Green New Deal to move South Korea towards carbon neutrality by 2050. The party takes a favorable stance on government intervention in the market, while keeping some distance from labour politics and labour movements. For this reason, the Democratic Party was classified as a "conservative liberal" party by left-wing media.

Lee Jae Myung supports New Deal liberalism, which is economically progressive and labor-friendly, unlike Moon Jae-in, who was a pro-chaebol centrist. Lee's stance won the support of former and current executives of major labor unions in South Korea. Lee Jae-myung was compared to Franklin Delano Roosevelt and his New Deal Coalition as he formed a big tent political coalition based on liberalism that brought together social conservatives, reformist liberals, left-wing social progressives, and anti-Chaebol labor activists. The Democratic Party succeeded in enacting the Serious Accident Corporate Punishment Act, which emphasizes corporate responsibility for industrial accidents, overcoming opposition from the right-wing conservative camp. Noh Woong-rae, a pro-labor member of the party, criticized the Yoon Seok-yeol government's attempt to extend working hours in an interview with left-wing media, emphasizing the strengthening of union rights and the responsibility of companies for safety management. He announced that he would soon attempt to enact a yellow envelope law that would limit companies' compensation for damages to striking workers.

=== Social policies ===
As a big tent party, the Democratic Party has no uniform social policy, with members ranging from social liberals to social conservatives. The party has generally been classified as socially liberal, but is also influenced by Christian movements, leading it to have some socially conservative characteristics. The party opposed the legalization of same-sex marriage and homosexuality.

==== Sexual minority and human rights policies ====
Most Democratic lawmakers oppose anti-discrimination laws that prohibit discrimination against LGBT+ people and immigrants, with most members valuing "social consensus." One DPK assemblyman said that "I am the most hawkish opposition to the anti-discrimination law. We, the Democrats make the decision". The party's liberal faction attempted to raise socially liberal policies, such as anti-discrimination laws, as controversial bills, but this was aborted due to opposition within the party. Some members of the party's conservative faction, along with church officials, staged a protest against the anti-discrimination law. In December 2023, party leader Lee Jae-myung stated his opposition to unilaterally passing an anti-discrimination law in the National Assembly. The party itself did not state an official position on the anti-discrimination law prior to the 2024 election, while conservative party answered 'reserve' on the anti-discrimination law. Newly elected speaker of the house Woo Won-shik said that "as a Christian, I oppose homosexuality and think that it's not right" while making it clear his negative stance on anti-discrimination law. Floor leader Park Chan-dae said that "I want Korea to become a country which shows the providence of God". Party secretary-general Kim Yoon-deok also opposed the anti-discrimination law saying that "anti-discrimination law tries to ban discrimination against sexual identity and sexual orientation as if they were the same as sex and disabilities which are legitimate grounds for non-discrimination". DPK supreme council member Lee Un-ju made it clear that DPK have no intention to enact 'anti-discrimination law' and strongly oppose it. She added that most of the DPK members are also opposing that law saying "Religious freedom is very important and as a conservative-liberal, I cherish the value of family very much".

In the North Jeolla provincial assembly, DPK assemblymen blocked an ordinance to urge anti-discrimination which was proposed by a member of the Justice Party. Na In-kwon, a DPK council member, who one of the main opponents of the ordinance, said the "Comprehensive Anti-Discrimination Law causes sexually curious youths to fall Into homosexuality, corrupting next generation leaders".

Assemblyman Kim Moon-soo, a member of the Democratic Party who is preparing the Student Human Rights Act as the first bill, said that he will reflect the concerns of the churches such as 'opposition to the homosexuality' in the bill, connoting that the DPK would rule out teenage sexual minorities from the scope of legal protection.

The party's socially conservative attitude on issues related to LGBT rights, feminism, and abortion mainly draw from Christianity and South Korea's Confucian traditions, but aside from those issues the party demonstrates moderate-to-liberal social policy. The DPK opposes corporal punishment for children and led the complete abolition of laws that justified corporal punishment for children in the past. The DPK also supports strengthening punishments for domestic violence.

==== Abortion and reproductive rights ====
In the 2010s, socially conservative members of the party that oppose abortion, including National Assembly Speaker Kim Jin-pyo, occupied key positions in the party.

In 2025, it proposed a law to allow abortion and abortion drugs under 10 weeks, and ban abortion for disorders of a fetus.

==== National Security Act ====
The party takes an ambiguous position that neither supports nor opposes the abolition of the National Security Act. 21 lawmakers—mostly consisting of Democratic Party members and led by Min Hyung-bae—proposed a bill to abolish the Act on October 15, 2021, but the bill was ultimately discarded.

==== Immigration ====
Most of the main politicians of the Democratic Party are neutral on the issue of immigration regardless of faction. As immigration issue is not the main social problem in South Korea due to the fact that South Korea is still a homogenous nation, there are not many discussions about immigration. The party claims to oppose racism, but they also opposed the passage of an anti-discrimination law which bans discrimination against immigrants. DPK has opposed conservative parties' proposal of lowering minimum wage for migrant workers.

==== Religion and other policies ====
The DPK's Christian influences have also been criticized by other religious groups. In December 2021, the Moon Jae-in government invested 1.2 billion won (US$1,000,000) in a campaign to promote playing Christmas carols in stores such as restaurants and cafes. South Korea's Buddhist community opposed the measure, calling it a policy that gives preferential treatment to a specific religion.

The DPK views criticized the consumption of dog meat, with President Moon Jae-in stating he was considering a legal ban on dog meat in September 2021. In addition, the party supports reforms on student rights issues.

=== Foreign policy ===
The Democratic Party has historically maintained a friendly stance with the United States, considering it a strategic ally of South Korea. However, its leader Lee Jae Myung referred to the presence of the United States armed forces in Korea after its liberation from Japan as an "occupying force". In a meeting with U.S. Senator Jon Ossoff, Lee expressed his opposition to the Taft–Katsura agreement, stating that the United States' approval of the agreement led to the Japanese annexation of Korea. Lee has also called China a "strategic cooperative partner" and said South Korea does not have to side with either country.

Prior to the Russian invasion of Ukraine, the party supported maintaining friendly relations with Russia, with the aim of swaying Russia to cooperate with South Korea rather than North Korea. The party condemned the Russian invasion of Ukraine. However, many Democratic Party politicians also did not attend Ukrainian President Volodymyr Zelenskyy's video speech to the National Assembly. The party caused controversy in April 2022 by inviting a pro-Russian professor who denied the Bucha Massacre at a party forum. When president Yoon Suk Yeol mentioned the possibility of providing weapons to Ukraine from South Korea on 19 April 2023, many DPK politicians criticized Yoon and said South Korea should not be hostile to Russia.

==== Japan ====
The party opposes historical revisionism in Japan and is known to speak for victims of Japanese war crimes. The DPK holds a strongly nationalist stance against Japan. President Moon Jae-in said the human rights of victims of Japanese colonialism are an important factor in the relations between the two countries. Party leader Lee Jae Myung stated in 2023 that Korea should declare an all-out war against Japan's historical revisionism.

The party opposes Japan's remilitarization efforts and revision of its constitution as it fears the return of Japanese imperialism. The party's politicians are opposed to a military alliance with Japan, stating that "Japan is not an ally" to South Korea. The party strongly opposed the Japanese government's discharge of radioactive water of the Fukushima Daiichi Nuclear Power Plant and criticized President Yoon Suk Yeol's government, saying that the government did not take a clear opposition position and advocated for the discharge.

==== North Korea ====
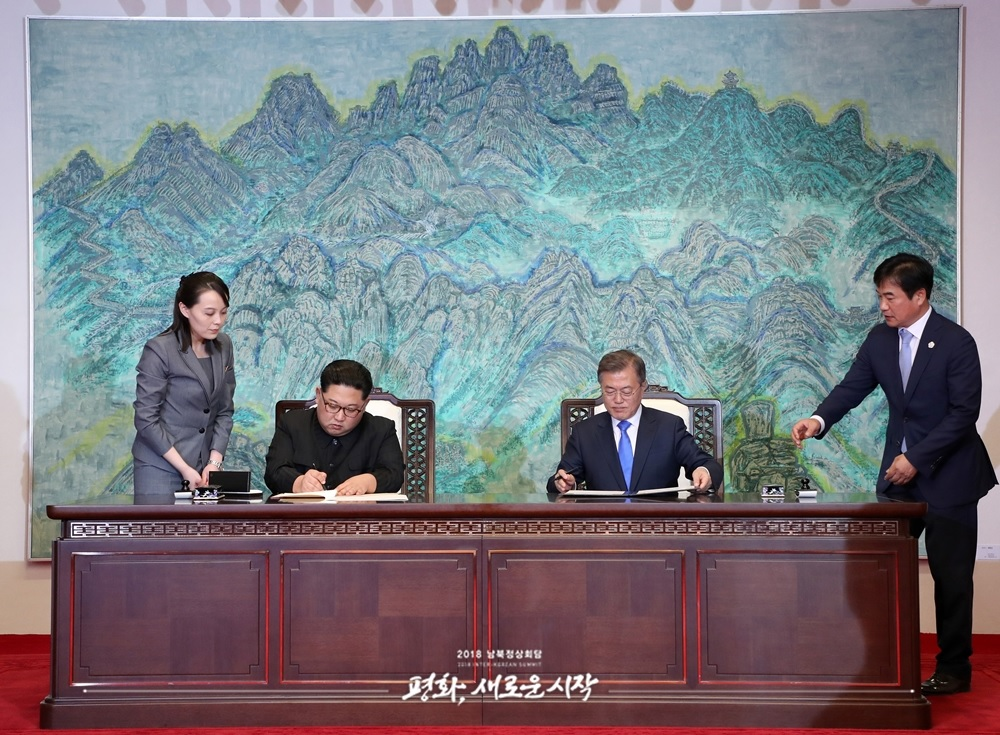
North Korean leader Kim Jong Un and South Korean President Moon Jae-in signing the Panmunjom Declaration, 27 April 2018

The party strongly supports the denuclearization of the Korean Peninsula and aims for peaceful relations with North Korea. The party also officially advocates for increasing cooperation with the North to create a foundation for reunification. The party has a strong ethnic nationalistic stance, so they often emphasize being of "our minjok" with North Korea.

== List of leaders ==
=== Current leadership ===
Supreme Council of the Democratic Party
Office	Officer(s)
Chair	Kim Min-seok
Floor leader	Han Byung-do
Elected members	Choi Min-hee; Park Sun-won; Seo Mi-hwa; Lee Sung-yoon; Han Min-soo
Appointed members	Jeon Yong-gi; Kwon Mi-kyung

=== Leaders ===
- Note: ^{ERC} – as head of Emergency Response Committee

No.	Name	Photo	Term of office		Election results
No.	Name	Photo	Took office	Left office	Election results
1	Kim Han-gil		26 March 2014	31 July 2014	No election
1	Ahn Cheol-soo		26 March 2014	31 July 2014	No election
(ERC)	Park Young-sun		4 August 2014	18 September 2014	Appointed
(ERC)	Moon Hee-sang		18 September 2014	9 February 2015	Appointed
2	Moon Jae-in		9 February 2015	27 January 2016	2015 Moon Jae-in – 45.3% Park Jie-won – 41.8% Lee In-young – 12.9%
(ERC)	Kim Chong-in		27 January 2016	27 August 2016	Appointed
3	Choo Mi-ae		27 August 2016	25 August 2018	2016 Choo Mi-ae – 54.03% Lee Jong-kul – 23.89% Kim Sang-gon – 22.08%
4	Lee Hae-chan		25 August 2018	29 August 2020	2018 Lee Hae-chan – 42.88% Song Young-gil – 30.73% Kim Jin-pyo – 26.39%
5	Lee Nak-yon		29 August 2020	9 March 2021	2020 Lee Nak-yon – 60.77% Kim Boo-kyum – 21.37% Park Joo-min – 17.85%
(acting)	Kim Tae-nyeon		9 March 2021	8 April 2021	Succeeded
(ERC)	Do Jong-hwan		8 April 2021	16 April 2021	Appointed
(ERC)	Yun Ho-jung		16 April 2021	2 May 2021	Succeeded
6	Song Young-gil		2 May 2021	10 March 2022	2021 Song Young-gil – 35.60% Hong Young-pyo – 35.01% Woo Won-shik – 29.38%
(ERC)	Yun Ho-jung		13 March 2022	2 June 2022	Appointed
(ERC)	Park Ji-hyun		13 March 2022	2 June 2022	Appointed
(acting)	Park Hong-keun		2 June 2022	7 June 2022	Appointed
(ERC)	Woo Sang-ho		7 June 2022	28 August 2022	Appointed
7	Lee Jae Myung		28 August 2022	24 June 2024 (Note: Lee Jae-myung suspended his leadership of the party to run for re-election as the party leader. Park Chan-dae served as acting leader during this period.)	2022 Lee Jae-myung – 77.77% Park Yong-jin – 22.23%
(acting)	Park Chan-dae		24 June 2024	18 August 2024	Appointed
(7)	Lee Jae Myung		18 August 2024	9 April 2025	2024 Lee Jae-myung – 85.40% Kim Doo-kwan – 12.12% Kim Ji-soo – 2.48%
(acting)	Park Chan-dae		9 April 2025	13 June 2025	Succeeded
(acting)	Kim Byung-kee		13 June 2025	2 August 2025	Succeeded
8	Jung Chung-rae		2 August 2025	24 June 2026	2025 Jung Chung-rae – 61.74% Park Chan-dae – 38.26%
(acting)	Han Byung-do		24 June 2026	17 August 2026	Succeeded
9	Kim Min-seok		17 August 2026	Incumbent	2026 Kim Min-seok – 54.08% Jung Chung-rae – 45.92%

=== Floor leaders ===
No.	Photo	Name	Term of office	
No.	Photo	Name	Took office	Left office
1		Jeon Byung-hun	26 March 2014	7 May 2014
2		Park Young-sun	7 May 2014	2 October 2014
—		Kim Yung-rok (acting)	2 October 2014	8 October 2014
3		Woo Yoon-keun	8 October 2014	6 May 2015
4		Lee Jong-kul	6 May 2015	4 May 2016
5		Woo Sang-ho	4 May 2016	16 May 2017
6		Woo Won-shik	16 May 2017	11 May 2018
7		Hong Young-pyo	11 May 2018	8 May 2019
8		Lee In-young	8 May 2019	7 May 2020
9		Kim Tae-nyeon	7 May 2020	8 April 2021
—		Kim Young-jin (acting)	8 April 2021	16 April 2021
10		Yun Ho-jung	16 April 2021	24 March 2022
11		Park Hong-keun	24 March 2022	28 April 2023
12		Park Kwang-on	28 April 2023	21 September 2023
—		Song Gi-heon (acting)	21 September 2023	26 September 2023
13		Hong Ihk-pyo	26 September 2023	3 May 2024
14		Park Chan-dae	3 May 2024	12 June 2025
15		Kim Byung-kee	13 June 2025	30 December 2025
—		Moon Jin-seok (acting)	30 December 2025	11 January 2026
16		Han Byung-do	11 January 2026	21 April 2026
—		Cheon Jun-ho (acting)	21 April 2026	6 May 2026
17		Han Byung-do	6 May 2026	Incumbent

=== Secretary-general ===
No.	Photo	Name	Term of office	
No.	Photo	Name	Took office	Left office
1		Noh Woong-rae	26 March 2014	13 June 2014
2		Joo Seung-yong	13 June 2014	4 August 2014
3		Cho Jeong-sik	4 August 2014	8 February 2015
4		Yang Seung-jo	8 February 2015	24 June 2015
5		Choi Jae-sung	24 June 2015	1 February 2016
6		Jeong Jang-seon	1 February 2016	26 August 2016
7		Ahn Gyu-back	27 August 2016	16 May 2017
8		Lee Choon-suak	16 May 2017	3 September 2018
9		Yun Ho-jung	3 September 2018	31 August 2020
10		Park Kwang-on	31 August 2020	4 May 2021
11		Youn Kwan-suk	4 May 2021	24 November 2021
12		Kim Young-jin	25 November 2021	28 March 2022
13		Kim Min-ki	28 March 2022	28 August 2022
14		Cho Jeong-sik	31 August 2022	21 April 2024
15		Kim Yoon-deok	21 April 2024	31 July 2025
(acting)		Lim Ho-seon	31 July 2025	3 August 2025
16		Jo Seoung-Iae	3 August 2025	24 June 2026
17		Yoo Dong-soo	24 June 2026	18 August 2026
18		Han Jeoung-ae	18 August 2026	Incumbent

== Election results ==
=== President ===
Election	Candidate	Votes	%	Result
2017	Moon Jae-in	13,423,800	41.08	Elected
2022	Lee Jae Myung	16,147,738	47.83	Lost
2025	Lee Jae Myung	17,287,513	49.42	Elected

=== Legislature ===
Election	Leader	Constituency				Party list				Seats		Position	Status
Election	Leader	Votes	%	Seats	+/-	Votes	%	Seats	+/-	No.	+/–	Position	Status
2016	Kim Chong-in	8,881,369	37	110 / 253	new	6,069,744	25.55	13 / 47	new	123 / 300	new	1st	Opposition (2016–2017)
2016	Kim Chong-in	8,881,369	37	110 / 253	new	6,069,744	25.55	13 / 47	new	123 / 300	new	1st	Government (2017–2020)
2020	Lee Hae-chan	14,345,425	49.91	163 / 253	▲53					180 / 300 (Note: Including 17 seats from Platform Party)	▲57	1st	Government (2020–2022)
2020	Lee Hae-chan	14,345,425	49.91	163 / 253	▲53					180 / 300	▲57	1st	Opposition (2022–2024)
2024	Lee Jae Myung	14,758,083	50.48	161 / 254	▼2					175 / 300 (Note: Including 14 seats from Democratic Alliance of Korea)	▼5	1st	Opposition (2024–2025)
2024	Lee Jae Myung	14,758,083	50.48	161 / 254	▼2					175 / 300	▼5	1st	Government (2025–present)

=== Local ===
Election	Leader	Metropolitan mayor/Governor	Provincial legislature	Municipal mayor	Municipal legislature
2014	Kim Han-gil; Ahn Cheol-soo	9 / 17	349 / 789	78 / 226	1,157 / 2,898
2018	Choo Mi-ae	14 / 17	652 / 824	151 / 226	1,638 / 2,927
2022	Yun Ho-jung; Park Ji-hyun	5 / 17	322 / 872	63 / 226	1,348 / 2,988
2026	Jung Chung-rae	12 / 16	589 / 933	119 / 227	1,574 / 3,035

== Logos ==
New Politics Alliance for Democracy (2014–2015)

Democratic Party (2015–2024)

Democratic Party Tricolor Banner
