= 2015 New Politics Alliance for Democracy leadership election =

- 8 February 2015
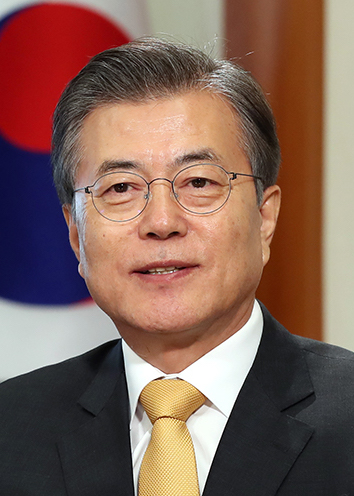

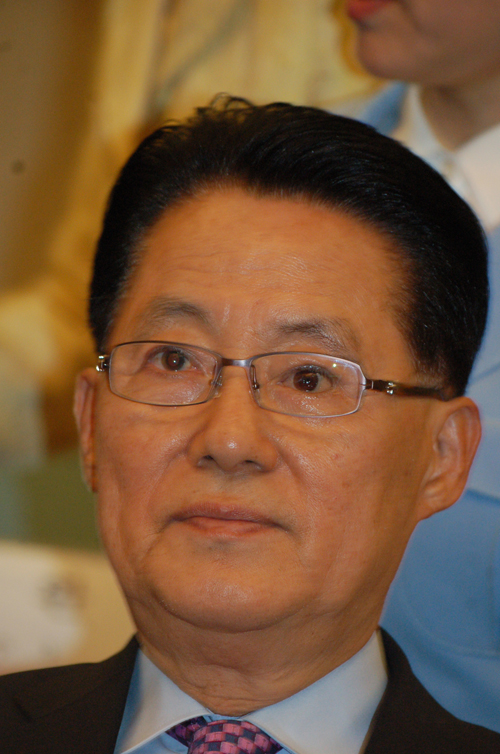

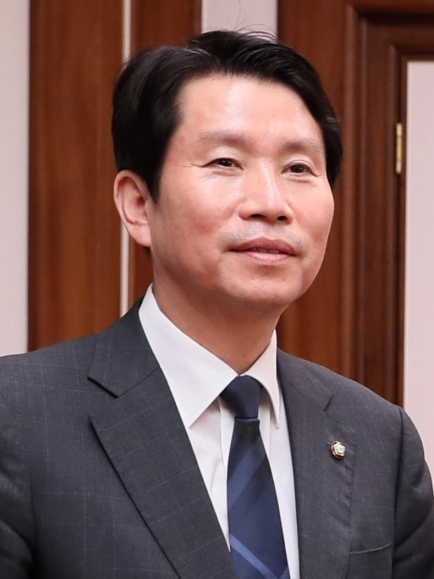
Candidate	Moon Jae-in	Park Jie-won	Lee In-young
Delegates	45.5%	42.7%	12.3%
Party members	39.98%	45.8%	14.3%
Opinion poll	58.5%	29.5%	12.5%
Non-voting members poll	43.29%	44.4%	12.3%
Total	45.3%	41.8%	12.9%
Leader before election
Moon Hee-sang (Interim)
Elected Leader
Moon Jae-in

The New Politics Alliance for Democracy held a leadership election on 8 February 2015, approximately six months after its co-leaders Kim Han-gil and Ahn Cheol-soo, resigned on 31 July 2014.

== Candidates ==
=== Dropped out ===
- Cho Kyoung-tae, member of the National Assembly(Saha B).
- Park Joo-sun, member of the National Assembly(Dong–Nam B).

=== Advance to the finals ===
- Moon Jae-in, member of the National Assembly(Sasang), former Chief Presidential Secretary of President Roh Moo-hyun.
- Lee In-young, member of the National Assembly(Guro A).
- Park Jie-won, member of the National Assembly(Mokpo), former Floor leader of the party, former Chief Presidential Secretary of President Kim Dae-jung, former Minister of Culture and Tourism.

== Results ==
The ratio of the results by sector was 45% for delegates, 30% for party members, 15% for opinion poll and 10% for non-voting members poll.

Final results
Candidates	Delegates (45%)	Party members (30%)	Opinion poll (15%)	Non-voting members poll (10%)	Total (100%)
Moon Jae-in	45.5%	39.98%	58.5%	43.29%	45.3%
Park Jie-won	42.7%	45.8%	29.5%	44.4%	41.8%
Lee In-young	12.3%	14.3%	12.5%	12.3%	12.9%
