= Yun Ho-jung =

South Korean politician (born 1963)

- 윤호중
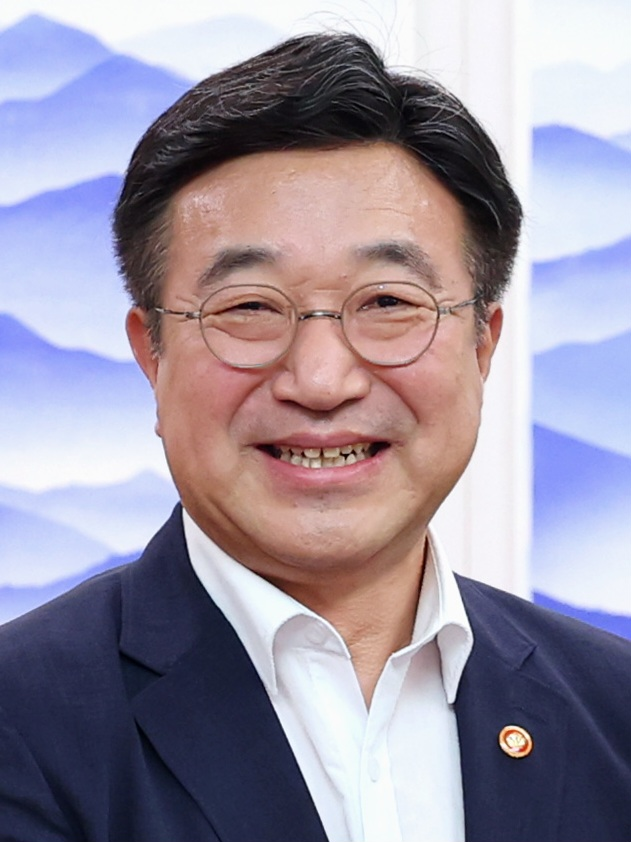

Minister of the Interior and Safety
- Incumbent
- Assumed office 19 July 2025
- President: Lee Jae Myung
- Prime Minister: Kim Min-seok; Han Seong-sook
- Preceded by: Lee Sang-min; Ko Ki-dong (acting); Kim Min-jae (acting)

Member of the National Assembly for Guri (Gyeonggi)
- Incumbent
- Assumed office 30 May 2012
- Preceded by: Joo Kwang-deok
- In office 30 May 2004 – 29 May 2008
- Preceded by: Chun Yong-won
- Succeeded by: Joo Kwang-deok
Party leadership offices
Leader of the Democratic Party
Interim
In office 10 March 2022 – 2 June 2022 Serving with Park Ji-hyun
| Preceded by | Song Young-gil |
| Succeeded by | Park Hong-keun (acting) |
In office 16 April 2021 – 2 May 2021
| Preceded by | Do Jong-hwan (interim) |
| Succeeded by | Song Young-gil |
Floor Leader of the Democratic Party
In office 16 April 2021 – 24 March 2022
| Preceded by | Kim Tae-nyeon; Kim Young-jin (acting) |
| Succeeded by | Park Hong-keun |
Secretary-General of the Democratic Party
In office 3 September 2018 – 31 August 2020
| President | Lee Hae-chan |
| Preceded by | Lee Choon-suak |
| Succeeded by | Park Kwang-on |

Personal details
- Born: 27 March 1963 (age 63) Gapyeong, Gyeonggi, South Korea
- Party: Democratic (2015)
- Other political affiliations: See list: PDP (1988–1991); NDUP (1991–1992); Democratic (1991) (1991–1995); Independent (1995, 2003); NCNP (1995–2000); MDP (2000–2003); Uri (2003–2007); UNDP (2007–2008); UDP (2008); Democratic (2008) (2008–2011); DUP (2011–2013); Democratic (2013) (2013–2014); NPAD (2014–2015)
- Education: Seoul National University
- Religion: Roman Catholic (Christian name : Martin)

Yun Ho-jung (Korean: 윤호중, born 27 March 1963) is a South Korean politician and former activist who has served as the minister of the interior and safety since 2025. A member of the Democratic Party of Korea (DPK), he previously served as the party's leader from April to May 2021 and from March to June 2022. Yun also served as the secretary-general of the DPK from 2018 to 2020 and is the incumbent member of the National Assembly for Guri.

== Early life and education ==
Born in Gapyeong in 1963, Yun attended Chuncheon High School. Subsequently, he studied philosophy at Seoul National University in the 1980s. In 1984, he was detained for being involved in a civilian confinement and assault incident; other notable figures involved in the event were Rhyu Si-min, Baik Tae-ung and Shim Jae-chul.

== Career ==
Yun started his political career in 1988 as assistant administrator in the Office of Planning & Coordination of the Peace Democratic Party, becoming close to Party Chairman Kim Dae-jung. After Kim was elected President in 1997, Yun worked under him at the Office of the President, mainly handling issues related to policy planning. In 1991, he began work as a secretary to former MP Han Kwang-ok, a notable pro-DJ figure.

Yun initially ran as an MP candidate for Guri in the 2000 election under the banner of the ruling Millennium Democratic Party (MDP), but was not elected. The year after, he was appointed deputy spokesperson of the MDP. He later withdrew from the MDP and joined the Uri Party, along with other dissidents. In the 2004 election, he was elected to the National Assembly.

Though he was not re-elected in 2008, Yun led his Democratic Party to form an opposition alliance with the Democratic Labour Party, the Creative Korea Party, the New Progressive Party and the National Participation Party in the 2010 local elections. Following his re-election in 2012 under the Democratic Unionist Party (DUP) banner, he worked for an alliance with the DUP candidate Moon Jae-in and independent candidate Ahn Cheol-soo for the presidential election in December. In 2013, he ran for the DUP's vice presidency, but was not elected.

After the election of Moon Jae-in in 2017, Yun was considered a potential candidate to head the newly-created Ministry of SMEs and Startups, but he was ultimately not appointed. In September 2018, he was appointed as the Secretary-General of the Democratic Party of Korea shortly after the election of party president Lee Hae-chan.

On 16 April 2021, Yun was elected the new parliamentary leader of the Democratic Party, defeating Park Wan-joo. He also became the acting party President, as the position was vacant since the resignation of Lee Nak-yon in March.

== Political views ==
Formerly holding pro-LGBT views, Yun expressed anti-LGBT views prior to the 2020 South Korean legislative election, stating that his party is not willing to cooperate with pro-LGBT parties, such as Green Party Korea. He is a moderate figure of the pro-Moon Jae-in faction.

== Controversy ==
On 27 March 2021, during the campaign of Park Young-sun, who was running for Mayor of Seoul in the 2021 by-elections, Yun told people, "There is a candidate who keeps lying, even though he knows he owns a property in Naegok-dong.", referring the PPP candidate and former Mayor Oh Se-hoon. He then asked people, "Is he rubbish or not?", and gave the answer, "Yes, he is rubbish." He also stated: "(Oh) approved a master plan, but he kept denying he had done so. Is he rubbish or not?" He finally urged people to "separate the rubbish properly on 7 April." The PPP subsequently condemned his remarks as "severe hate speech" and "ruinous social splitting that must be stopped immediately."

== Personal life ==
Yun's mother, Lee Soon-ye, died in 2017.

== Election results ==
| Year | Elections | Constituency | Political party | Votes (%) | Remarks |
|---|---|---|---|---|---|
| 2000 | 16th National Assembly General Election | Guri (Gyeonggi) | MDP | 20,376 (31.82%) | Defeated (2nd) |
| 2004 | 18th National Assembly General Election | Guri (Gyeonggi) | Uri | 36,433 (43.91%) | Won |
| 2008 | 18th National Assembly General Election | Guri (Gyeonggi) | UDP | 29,046 (43.03%) | Defeated (2nd) |
| 2012 | 19th National Assembly General Election | Guri (Gyeonggi) | DUP | 40,524 (48.67%) | Won |
| 2016 | 20th National Assembly General Election | Guri (Gyeonggi) | Democratic | 40,820 (46.59%) | Won |
| 2020 | 21st National Assembly General Election | Guri (Gyeonggi) | Democratic | 64,668 (58.64%) | Won |
| 2024 | 22nd National Assembly General Election | Guri (Gyeonggi) | Democratic | 59,331 (53.97%) | Won |
