= Lee Jong-kul =

South Korean politician (born 1957)

- 이종걸
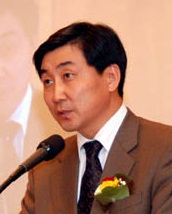
- At Hotel Shilla, Seoul in April 2007

Member of the National Assembly
- In office 30 May 2000 – 29 May 2020
- Preceded by: Kim Il-ju
- Succeeded by: Kang Deuk-gu
- Constituency: Anyang Manan (Gyeonggi)

Personal details
- Born: 22 May 1957 (age 69) Seoul, South Korea
- Party: Democratic Party of Korea
- Education: Seoul National University

Korean name
- Hangul: 이종걸
- Hanja: 李鍾杰
- RR: I Jonggeol
- MR: I Chonggŏl

Lee Jong-kul (Korean: 이종걸; born 22 May 1957) is a South Korean politician. He has a bachelor's degree in law from Seoul National University. He is currently a member of the National Assembly and was the floor leader of The Minjoo Party of Korea. His grandfather was Lee Hoe-yeong.

== Election results ==
Year	Elections	Constituency	Political party	Votes (%)	Results
2000	16th National Assembly General Election	Anyang Manan (Gyeonggi)	MDP	36,557 (38.81%)	Won
2004	17th National Assembly General Election	Anyang Manan (Gyeonggi)	Uri	59,346 (51.90%)	Won
2008	18th National Assembly General Election	Anyang Manan (Gyeonggi)	UDP	41,660 (44.64%)	Won
2012	19th National Assembly General Election	Anyang Manan (Gyeonggi)	DUP	58,328 (50.87%)	Won
2016	20th National Assembly General Election	Anyang Manan (Gyeonggi)	Democratic	55,217 (45.39%)	Won
