= Jeungpyeong County =

Coordinates: 36°47′N 127°35′E

Jeungpyeong
- County
- Bogangcheon Cottonwood Forest in Jeungpyeong-eup

- Flag

- Location in South Korea
- Country: South Korea
- Region: Hoseo
- Administrative divisions: 1 eup, 1 myeon

Government
  - Mayor: Lee Jae-yeong(이재영)

Area
  - Total: 81.84 km^{2} (31.60 sq mi)

Population (2024)
  - Total: 37,207
  - Density: 454/km^{2} (1,180/sq mi)
  - Dialect: Chungcheong
- Website: jp.go.kr

Korean name
- Hangul: 증평군
- Hanja: 曾坪郡
- RR: Jeungpyeong-gun
- MR: Chŭngp'yŏng-gun

Jeungpyeong County (Korean: 증평군) is a county in North Chungcheong Province, South Korea.

== Location ==
Jeungpyeong is in the centrally located in Chungcheongbuk-do. It is located East of Jincheon, West of Goesan, south of Eumseong, north of Cheongwon.

== Symbols ==
- county tree: Ginkgo tree
- county bird: Snowy Egret
- county flower: White Magnolia

== History ==
- December 31, 1990: Chungcheongbuk-do Jeungpyeong local office is construct of Goesan-gun, Jeungpyeong-eup and Doan-myeon.
- August 30, 2003: Jeungpyeong local office is raised to Jeungpyeong-gun, and it became independence from Goesan-gun.

== Education ==
- Jeungpyeong is the site of several school and tertiary institutions, including:

=== Elementary school ===
- Doan Elementary School
- Jeungpyeong Elementary School
- Jukri Elementary School
- Sambo Elementary School

=== Middle school ===
- Hyeongseok Middle School
- Jeungpyeong Middle School
- Jeungpyeong Girl's Middle School

=== High school ===
- Chungbuk Business High School
- Hyeongseok High School
- Jeungpyeong Technical High School

=== Tertiary Institution ===
- Korea National University of Transportation

== Twin towns – sister cities ==
Jeungpyeong is twinned with:

- Guannan County, Jiangsu, China
