= Park Ji-hyun (politician) =

South Korean social activist (born 1996)

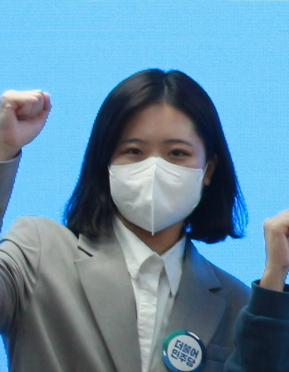
- Park in 2022

Interim leader of the Democratic Party
- In office 13 March 2022 – 7 June 2022 Serving with Yun Ho-jung
- Preceded by: Song Young-gil
- Succeeded by: Park Hong-keun (acting)

Personal details
- Born: 29 March 1996 (age 30) Wonju, South Korea
- Party: Democratic (since 2022)
- Education: Hallym University (Journalism)
- Occupation: Politician; social activist
- Nickname: "Flame"

Korean name
- Hangul: 박지현
- RR: Bak Jihyeon
- MR: Pak Chihyŏn

Park Ji-hyun (Korean: 박지현; pronounced [pɑktɕiçʌn]; born 29 March 1996) is a South Korean politician and social activist known for exposing one of the largest online sex-crime rings in South Korea, called the Nth Room. A member of the Democratic Party of Korea (DPK), she served as the co-interim leader of the party from March to June 2022. Park was named to the Time100 Next, Time magazine's list of emerging leaders, as well as the 2022 BBC 100 Women and Bloomberg 50 lists, in recognition of her work in combating digital sex crimes and fighting for gender equality in politics.

== Team Flame ==
In 2018, Park was studying journalism at Hallym University and working as a student reporter, when #MeToo protests took place in central Seoul, demanding that the government do more to combat illegal filming of women and girls. Inspired by the protests, she and her classmate Won Eun-ji planned to submit an article for the Korean News Agency Commission's annual student journalism competition. They initially planned to write about the "spycam epidemic" in South Korea, where men secretly film women and girls without their consent.

In July 2019, Park and Won started infiltrating the Nth room, a notorious sexual-abuse ring on Telegram, under the name "Team Flame". Working with the police, their investigation led to the arrest and eventual conviction of the two ringleaders, whom they discovered had been blackmailing and coercing women and girls as young as 12 years old into performing degrading acts, and then selling their images and videos illegally.

Their first article came to the attention of two journalists from The Hankyoreh, who then collaborated with Park and Won to publish an in-depth newspaper report in November 2019, while protecting their identities. The Nth room ringleaders sought to retaliate, and two current affairs programs on TV eventually picked up the story; meanwhile, women mobilized on Twitter to expose and further publicize their crimes. As details of the Nth room case came to light, more than five million people signed national petitions calling for harsher punishment and disclosing perpetrators' identities. By the end of 2020, 3,757 people had been arrested in connection with the case.

For years, Park was known only by the pseudonym "Flame" and was interviewed in the Netflix documentary Cyber Hell, hidden in shadow. She also wrote and published an anonymous memoir about exposing the criminals behind the Nth room.

== Party politics ==
Park met Lee Jae Myung when he was the governor of Gyeonggi Province through her advocacy work. Governor Lee attended the June 2020 launch event for the Gyeonggi Province support center for digital sex crime victims.

Her identity was revealed in early 2022, when she agreed to help campaign for the Democratic Party of Korea (DPK) in the lead-up to the national elections. Lee, who was campaigning for president, assured Park that he would crack down on online sex crimes and fight discrimination against women in the workplace. In January 2022, Park was appointed vice-chairwoman of the DPK's women's affairs committee. As a special advisor to Lee's campaign, she also helped to mobilize the youth vote. On March 9, 2022, Lee narrowly lost to Yoon Suk Yeol of the conservative People Power Party, with an estimated 58 percent of women in their twenties voting for Lee.

On March 13, 2022, Park was named interim co-chair of the DPK's emergency committee at the age of 25, after the previous party leaders resigned in the wake of their electoral defeat. In the days following the March presidential election, 11,000 new members joined the Democratic Party in Seoul alone, 80 percent of whom were women. Hopes were high that Park's visibility as co-chair would help the DPK consolidate its lead among young female voters. Still, the party suffered disastrous results in the local elections in June, losing its majority across major local offices. The DPK had secured only five out of 17 provincial governor and metropolitan mayoral seats, compared to the 14 held previously, while the conservative People Power Party won a decisive 12 out of 17 posts.

Park promptly resigned, along with other party leaders, blaming the party's resistance to reforms. In turn, her critics blamed Park for her inexperience, and for exposing infighting within the DPK, and being distracted by issues related to sexual harassment, rather than focusing on the local elections. She had also made high-profile blunders which were embarrassing to the party, such as when she confused the 2002 Battle of Yeonpyeong with the 2010 sinking of the ROKS Cheonan, and she had to publicly apologize.

During her brief term as party co-chair, Park expelled Representative Park Wan-joo from the party for sexual misconduct and brought a formal complaint against Representative Choe Kang-wook to the party's ethics committee, over a comment he allegedly made during an online meeting. The Korea Times noted, "She was also one of the rare leadership figures within the party speaking up against issues many tried to ignore, such as sex crimes committed by men in power, the DPK's failed real estate policy and radical voices that have wielded too much influence over the party."

In July 2022, the DPK rejected Park's request for an exemption from the rule requiring candidates for party leadership to have been members for at least six months, preventing her from standing for party chairman at the August 28 national convention. Park had formally joined as a party member on February 14, 2022.

== Personal life ==
Park Ji-hyun is originally from Wonju in Gangwon Province, South Korea.

== See also ==
- Feminism in South Korea
- Kwon In-sook
