= 2014 South Korean by-elections =

The 7.30 by-elections were held in South Korea on 30 July 2014. 15 seats to the National Assembly of South Korea were contested while re-election occurred for 1 seat to the Municipal Council of Suwon.

== Causes for Elections ==
The following Members of National Assembly lost their seat:

- Seoul Dongjak 2nd District: Chung Mong-joon (Saenuri), due to his candidacy for the Metropolitan Mayor of Seoul.
- Busan Haeundae-Gijang 1st District: Suh Byung-soo (Saenuri), due to his candidacy for the Metropolitan Mayor of Busan.
- Gwangju Gwangsan 2nd District: Lee Yong-sup (Independent), due to his candidacy for the Metropolitan Mayor of Gwangju.
- Daejeon Daedeok: Park Seoung-hyo (Saenuri), due to his candidacy for the Metropolitan Mayor of Daejeon.
- Ulsan Nam 2nd District: Kim Gi-hyeon (Saenuri), due to his candidacy for the Metropolitan Mayor of Ulsan.
- Gyeonggi Suwon 2nd District: Shin Jang-yong (NPAD), due to his violation of the Public Official Election Act.
- Gyeonggi Suwon 3rd District: Nam Kyung-pil (Saenuri), due to his candidacy for the Governor of Gyeonggi.
- Gyeonggi Suwon 4th District: Kim Jin-pyo, due to his candidacy for the Governor of Gyeonggi.
- Gyeonggi Pyeongtaek 2nd District: Lee Jae-young (Saenuri), due to his violation of the Public Official Election Act and embezzlement.
- Gyeonggi Gimpo: Yoo Jeong-bok (Saenuri), due to his candidacy for the Metropolitan Mayor of Incheon.
- North Chungcheong Chungju: Yoon Jin-sik (Saenuri), due to his candidacy for the Governor of North Chungcheong.
- South Chungcheong Seosan-Taean: Sung Wan-jong (Saenuri), due to his violation of the Public Official Election Act.
- South Jeolla Suncheon-Gokseong: Kim Sun-dong (UPP), due to his violation of the Firearms, Knives and Explosives Regulation Act.
- South Jeolla Naju-Hwasun: Bae Ki-woon (NPAD), due to his violation of the Public Official Election Act.
- South Jeolla Damyang–Hampyeong–Yeonggwang–Jangseong: Lee Nak-yon (NPAD), due to his candidacy for the Governor of South Jeolla.

== Results ==
The ruling conservative Saenuri Party gained 11 seats and retained their majority in the National Assembly. The liberal party NPAD conceded defeat. Later, the NPAD split into two political parties: the Democratic Party of Korea, led by Moon Jae-in, and the People's Party, led by Ahn Cheol-soo. A leading issue during these elections was the Sewol ferry disaster.
