= Song Young-gil =

South Korean politician

- 송영길
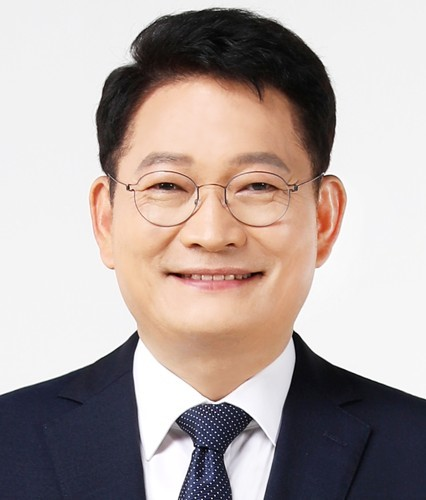

Leader of the Democratic Party
- In office 2 May 2021 – 10 March 2022
- Preceded by: Lee Nak-yon; Kim Tae-nyeon (acting); Yun Ho-jung (acting); Do Jong-hwan (interim)
- Succeeded by: Yun Ho-jung and Park Ji-hyun (ERC); Park Hong-keun (interim); Woo Sang-ho (interim); Lee Jae Myung

Member of the National Assembly
- Incumbent
- Assumed office 4 June 2026
- Preceded by: Park Chan-dae
- Constituency: Yeonsu A (Incheon)
- In office 30 May 2016 – 29 April 2022
- Preceded by: Choi Won-sik
- Succeeded by: Lee Jae Myung
- Constituency: Gyeyang B (Incheon)
- In office 30 May 2000 – 26 April 2010
- Preceded by: Ahn Sang-soo (Gyeyang–Ganghwa A, Incheon); Lee Gyong-jae (Gyeyang–Ganghwa B, Incheon)
- Succeeded by: Lee Sang-kwon
- Constituency: Gyeyang (Incheon) (2000–2004); Gyeyang B (Incheon) (2004–2010)

Mayor of Incheon
- In office 1 July 2010 – 30 June 2014
- Preceded by: Ahn Sang-soo
- Succeeded by: Yoo Jeong-bok

Chairman of the Presidential Committee on Northern Economic Cooperation
- In office 25 August 2017 – 24 July 2018
- President: Moon Jae-in
- Prime Minister: Lee Nak-yon
- Preceded by: office established
- Succeeded by: Kuon Gu-hoon

Special Advisor for Peacefully Diplomacy to the President
- Incumbent
- Assumed office 30 August 2026
- President: Lee Jae Myung
- Prime Minister: Han Seong-sook

Personal details
- Born: 21 March 1963 (age 63) (Solar Calendar); 26 February 1963 (Lunar Calendar) Goheung, South Jeolla, South Korea
- Party: Democratic Party (더불어민주당)
- Spouse: Nam Young-sin
- Children: 1 son and 1 daughter
- Education: Yonsei University
- Religion: Roman Catholicism (Christian name: Andrew Kim Taegon)

- Song Young-gil
- Hangul: 송영길
- Hanja: 宋永吉
- RR: Song Yeonggil
- MR: Song Yŏnggil

Song Young-gil (Korean: 송영길; Hanja: 宋永吉; born 21 March 1963) is a South Korean politician who served as the Leader of the centre-liberal Democratic Party from 2 May 2021 until 10 March 2022. He was Member of the National Assembly, as well as the Chairman of the Foreign Affairs and Unification Committee of the 21st National Assembly. He also held various positions such as the Chair of the Democratic Party's Special Committee on Peace and Cooperation in Northeast Asia and as the Chair of the Presidential Committee on Northern Economic Cooperation. He previously served as Mayor of Incheon from 2010 to 2014. Prior to serving as mayor, he was a democratic movement student activist and a member of the Korean National Assembly for three terms. He is a practicing Catholic.

== Life ==
=== Early life ===
Song, Young-gil was born in Goheung, South Jeolla Province, the fourth son of a poor civil servant. He grew up in a rural area and was inspired by nature. In May 1980 when he was a senior high school student, he witnessed the Gwangju Democratization Movement. Seeing the deaths of innocent citizens with his own eyes marked a turning point in his life. After entering Yonsei University to study business management in 1981, he joined the anti-dictatorship movement without any hesitation. In 1984, he succeeded in removing the government-controlled student body and reinstated the student council. He subsequently became the first ever directly elected president of the student council and thereafter led the student democratization movement. He was jailed as a result. In 1988, he was recognized for his contribution to democratization and had his rights reinstated.

=== Labor movement ===
After release from jail in 1985, Song moved to Incheon to start life as a laborer. He became a welder at the Daewoo Motor factory in Incheon. He also worked in watch, glove, and furniture factories for two years. In 1987 with the support of Germany's human rights foundation 'Bread for the World' and Kim, Dae-joong, Kim, Young-sam and other politicians, Song established 'Christian Public Education Research Institutes' in Bupyeong, Incheon. Song conducted legal counseling for human rights violations, education on labor unions, and provided legal support. While working as a taxi driver, he democratized the Taxi Labor Union and became the first Secretary-General of the National Taxi Trade Union, Incheon Division in 1991. He dedicated himself in promoting the rights of transportation laborers.

=== Human rights lawyer ===
After passing the National Bar Examination in 1994, he went to Incheon. He worked as a human rights lawyer.

=== Political career ===
He ran in the 1999 by-election to help people in need but lost because the general public was disenchanted by politics at the time. Shortly afterwards, Song began his career as a National Assemblyman in 2000.

==== Human rights activities ====
Based on his experience as a lawyer, Song applied to work for the Legislation & Judiciary Committee to take care of bills that are closely related to the people's livelihood and human rights. Song led a National assembly delegation which attended a Human Rights and Parliamentary Conference for the five Northeast Asian nations which was held in Mongolia. At the conference, he made a speech about the human rights situation in Korea and proposed legislation on anti-humanitarian crimes. As a member of the Legislation & Judiciary Committee of the National Assembly, Song played a crucial role in creating a law on the National Human Rights Commission. Song also assumed the role of Chairman of the Democratic Party's Commission on the Yong-san Tragedy to negotiate with the government and Seoul over much delayed compensation and funeral issues.

==== Correcting distorted history ====
Events during the Japanese colonization of Korea have been thorny issues for decades, including the issue of compensation for Korean comfort women used by the Japanese army, the distorted history which appears in Japanese textbooks, and the name and territorial rights over the islet of Dokdo. In response to this, Song proposed a resolution on the distortion of Japanese history books and the elimination of vestiges of the Japanese colonial period with other lawmakers, calling for immediate action by the Korean government. In 2001, through the activities of a special committee, Song sent CDs containing information on Japan's invasion, comfort women and the distortion of Japanese history books to 600 overseas institutions, demanding Japan's apology and asking for the support of other nations. In addition to calling for Japan's apology, Song attended the Joint Conference of the Korea-Japan Inter-Parliamentary Council and proposed a statement which sought ways for Korea and Japan to cooperate in diverse areas as new partners. As such, Song has underscored a more accurate perception of history and contributed to a future-oriented partnership.

==== Support for Myanmar's democratization movement ====
Song thought that there should be keen interest in and support for Myanmar from the whole world as well as Korea, and has cooperated with it since 2003. In 2007, he and 13 lawmakers who were dedicated to the democratization of Korea during the dictatorship in the 1980s jointly proposed a resolution that supported the democratization of Myanmar and donated money that had been raised to the Korean branch of the Myanmar Democratization Alliance. In October 2008, they announced a resolution which called for the release of Aung San Suu Kyi from house arrest and expressed support for the Myanmare people who continued to struggle against the junta. They also sent a letter to UN Secretary-General Ban, Ki-moon and Myanmar military regime to urge the democratization of Myanmar.

==== Inter-Korean exchanges ====
Song has said that to prepare for reunification and to resolve the North Korean nuclear issue, the South needs to increase similarities through economic, political and cultural exchanges with the North, which would help the North Korean economy increase its self-reliance. He believes that to bring lasting peace to the Korean Peninsula, new changes are much needed. In this context, Song went to Pyongyang with young businessmen in 2003 and discussed the possibility of expanding economic cooperation and cultural exchanges between the two Koreas. Song has also visited Gaeseong Industrial Complex several times which has been playing a critical role in ensuring the self-reliance of North Korea and contributing to peace on the Korean Peninsula and in the world. Through these visits, he saw for himself the importance of Gaeseong Industrial Complex for Korean small enterprises as new sales channels. He held meetings with businessmen and government officials to encourage more companies to move to the North which might in turn induce the communist nation to introduce reform and openness. Song and the Democratic Party urged the government to carry out what had been agreed upon in the June 15 and October 4 Joint Declaration to improve relations between the two Koreas which had been strained by the tough stance of the current administration on North Korea. He also called on the government to enter dialogue with the North and to closely cooperate with neighboring countries to form 6-party talks which play such a vital role in the joint security of Northeast Asia. After becoming Incheon Mayor in 2010, Mayor Song declared Incheon to be the outpost of reconciliation, exchanges, peace and reunification of the two Koreas. Despite opposition from the government, he has insisted that there should be peace on the 5 islands near the Northern Limit Line in the West Sea for the economic development of Incheon. At the same time, Song has provided products to mothers and babies in North Korea through an agreement with the Korea Peace Foundation, which opened a door that was shut after the North's sinking of the Cheonan.

==== Enhancing competitiveness for small and medium enterprises ====
While working for 6 years as a member of the Finance & Economy Committee in the National Assembly, Song felt that the main driver of Korea's economy came from the small companies which account for 80% of all companies and therefore that the most important thing is to lay down foundations for those firms to grow. In 2008, most small exporting firms bought currency option products called KIKO (Knock-in Knock-out) to avoid the risk of foreign exchange rate fluctuations. The companies were about to collapse again due to the inappropriate exchange rate policy of the current government but the government didn't take the proper measures to rescue small companies. Song urged the Democratic Party to pay keen interest in this issue and to find solutions. By forming a special committee, he held dozens of meetings with small enterprises and led hearings to narrow differences and find solutions. In due course, he got a promise from the government to provide speedy support for small enterprises which performed well.

==== Diplomatic activities ====
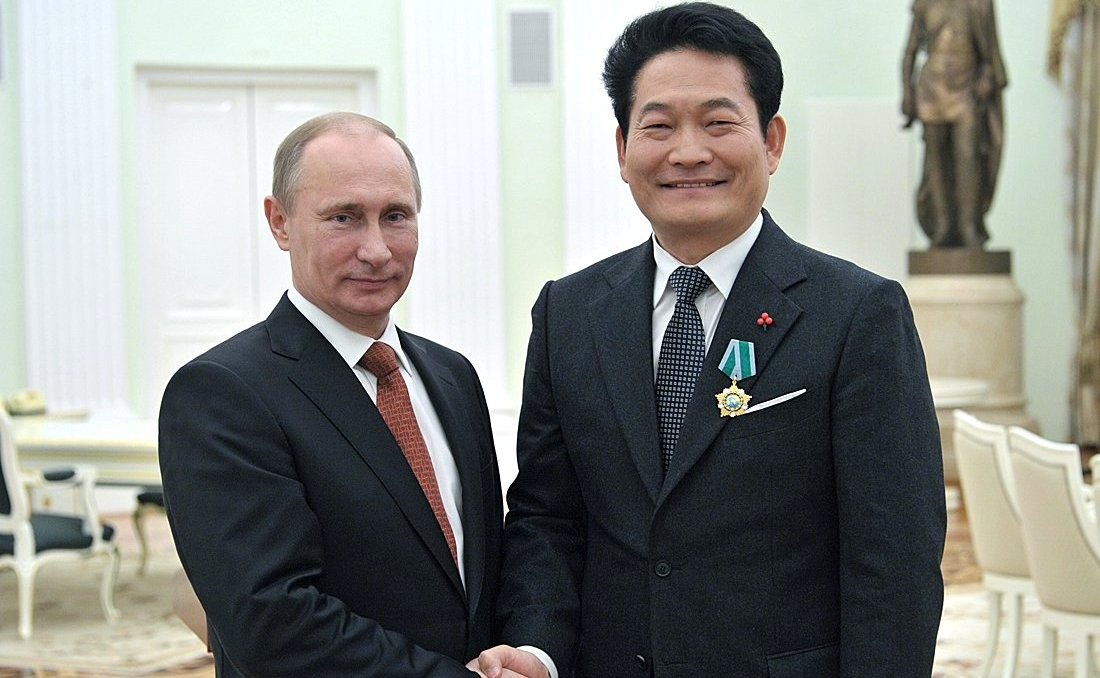
Song with Russian President Vladimir Putin

He became the Chairman of the Korean-Japan Inter-Parliamentary Council's 21st Century Committee in 2004, and consequently held discussions and conferences on the various issues concerning Korea and Japan. He was also the Chairman of the Korea-France Parliaments' Friendship Association and led active exchanges to promote knowledge about the EU and France. In 2007, he received Légion d'Honneur Chevalier from France for his dedication in promoting relations between Korea and France. After his second term, Song realized the importance of diplomacy and visited and received other nations in order to increase exchanges and deepen the understanding of the US, Australia, China and other neighboring nations. When the Korea-US FTA negotiations began in 2006, Song became the Chairman of the Uri Party's Special Committee on the Korea-US FTA in order to reflect the opinions of stakeholders and to take measures. As such, he was able to expand exchanges with US officials including negotiation delegates and US congressmen. As the recognition of products from Gaesong Industrial Complex as Korean products became a hot issue, Song exchanged opinions on Gaeseong Industrial Complex that could help North Korea's self-reliance and guarantee peace on the Korean Peninsula. In 2007, at the invitation of a US senator, he attended a reception marking the opening of the US Congress and discussed the Korea-US FTA, the North Korean nuclear program, and peace on the Korean Peninsula with then presidential nominee Obama, Senator Biden and other congressmen of the Democratic Party. In 2008, the results of the US presidential election and the Democratic Party's regaining control after 8 years demanded new cooperation and close exchanges between Korea and the US. Song formed a Special Committee on Korea-US Relations Development and as chairman he endeavored to establish balanced diplomatic relations between Korea and the US, develop inter-Korean relations, enhance the Korea-US alliance, and promote economic cooperation including the Korea-US FTA.

In the 2020s, his diplomat leaned much more pro-American, but at the same time, he is friendly to North Korea. He believes that the U.S. should lead the easing of sanctions on North Korea, recognition of the Kim Jong Un regime, and declaration of the 'Declaration of the end' (종전선언 or 종전협정). He met with U.S. congressmen on November 24, 2021 and strongly proposed making North Korea a pro-U.S. state. On the other hand, he is hostile to Japan.

=== Incheon mayoral election ===
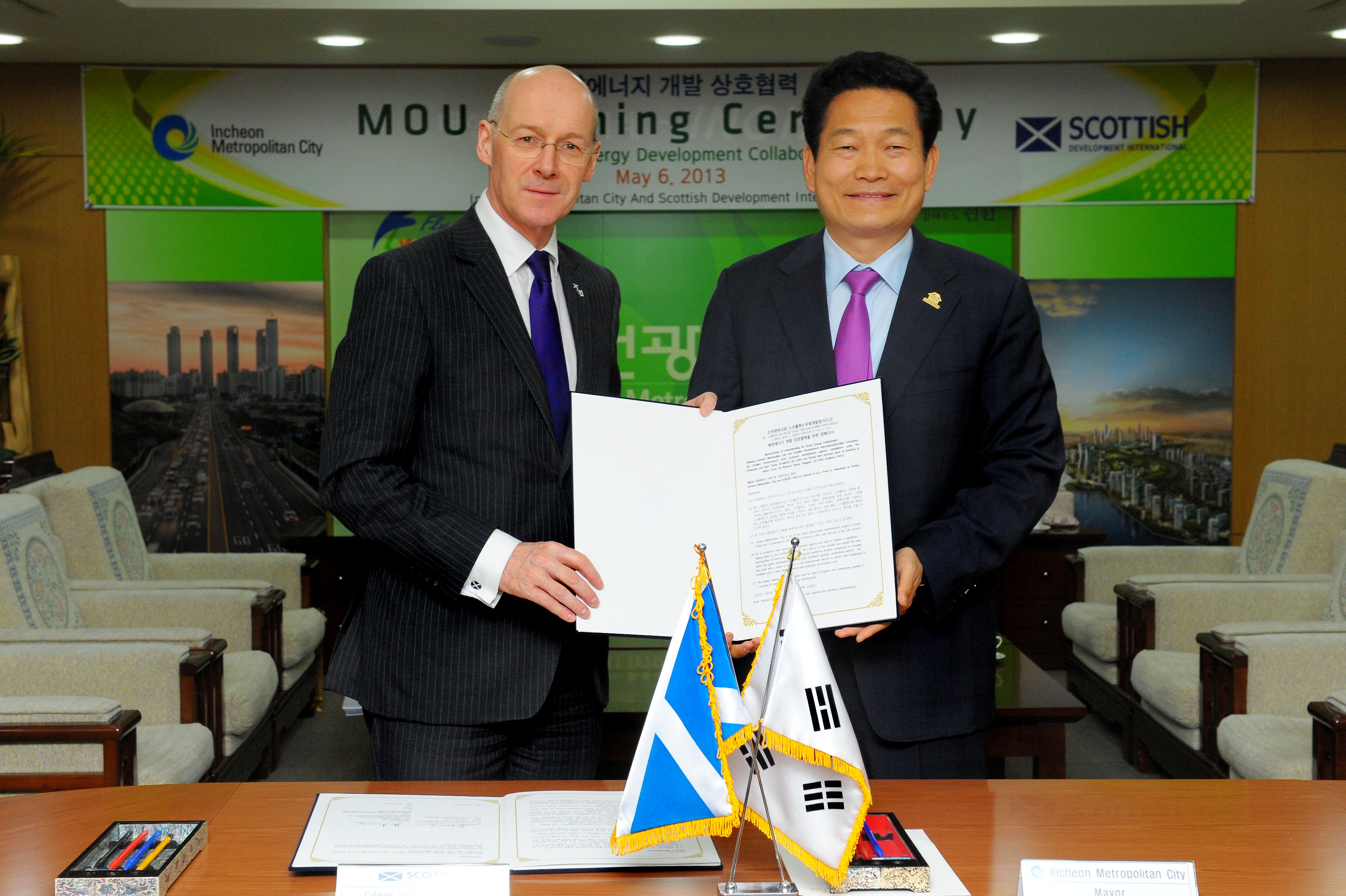
Mayor Song in 2013 (right)

When he declared his intention to run in the Incheon mayoral election, Song explained that he was running to win. At that time, the victory of the Democratic Party in the three metropolitan areas of Seoul, Gyeonggi Province and Incheon was uncertain, but he made it clear that he would win in Incheon, triggering victories in Seoul and Gyeonggi Province, which will lay the foundations for a change of administration. With the announcement of his running, Song talked about his plans for nurturing small enterprises, balancing development between the old and new town, expanding welfare provision, enhancing educational competitiveness, and providing free eco-friendly meals to make Incheon the economic capital of Korea. link

=== Tsinghua University ===
Song ran for 6th local election (Incheon mayoral election) in 2014. After losing the election against Yoo, Jeong Bok by 1.75%, He decided to study abroad at Tsinghua University in China. While he was studying at Tsinghua University, his research foci were housing, jobs and the welfare system. He returned to Korea in 2015. Following October, he launched 'eat and live' research lab to further develop his research at Tsinghua University into policies.

=== Member of the 20th National Assembly ===
On 1 March 2016, Song declared that he is running for the National Assembly as a Democrat in Incheon's Gyeyang (B) constituency, which he represented in previous years. He considered running in competitive constituency. However, he decided to run in Gyeyang (B) after assemblyman Choi, Won Sik leaves the Democratic Party despite Song's persuasion to stay. Song declared that he will run for the party leadership after the general election and he said that he takes the full responsibility of the entire elections in Incheon and will recover the Incheon politics. On 13 April 2016, he won the post by 12% against Yoon, Hyung-sun of Saenuri Party. He returned to the National Assembly after 6 years since he ran for the 5th General election in 2010

On 24 July 2016, He declared his running for the party leadership. He pledged to devote himself to make the Party into a 'strong' opposition and to replace the Saenuri government in the upcoming presidential election. He was considered to be the leading candidate who represented the wide mainstream democrats. However, he lost the primary election. Political commentators analyze Song's 'cut-off' with two reasons, disparity of 'pro-Roh' (pro-Roh, Moo-Hyun) voters and the very last minute leadership bid waged by Lee, Jong-kul, which gathered strong 'non-Roh' voters.

On 8 February 2017, Song joined Moon, Jae-in's campaign for the 19th Presidential Election as chief campaign manager. It is later known that Moon persuaded Song several times to join his presidential campaign. Song commented that "I also considered running for the presidential election, however, I decided to cooperate with Moon to replace the government and believe that helping Moon is answering the call of the people of Republic of Korea"

At the beginning of Moon's presidency, Song has been designated as the special envoy of President Moon Jae-in to the Russian Federation in May 2017. In following August, Song became the chairman of the Presidential Committee on Northern Economic Cooperation., which holds the equivalent grade of a deputy prime minister.

=== Leader of the Democratic Party ===
On 2 May 2021, Song was elected the new president of the Democratic Party. He received 35.60%, barely defeating Hong Young-pyo with a margin of 0.59%.

On 7 March 2022, just two days before the 2022 South Korean presidential election, Song was attacked while campaigning for the presidential candidate, Lee Jae-myung, in Sinchon. He was immediately brought to a nearby hospital, and is reportedly safe. Several Democratic MPs were criticised for labelling the incident as a "far-right terrorism", although the suspect was reportedly a Democratic-friendly YouTuber.

=== Seoul Mayoral Election ===
On April 1, 2022, he declared his candidacy for the Seoul Mayor election during the 8th National Simultaneous Local Election. He became the Democratic candidate by beating former lawmaker Kim Jin-ae through the Democratic primary. However, in the main election, he lost to Oh Se-hoon.

=== Political scandal and imprisonment ===
On December 19, 2023, the prosecutor's office arrested Song Young-gil on charges of distributing bribes to win the 2021 Democratic Party of Korea leadership by-election. He was acquitted of the charges in the leadership election, but was convicted and sentenced on January 8, 2025, to two years imprisonment for receiving illegal political funding from seven businesspeople.

However, on February 13, 2026, the Seoul High Court’s Criminal Division 1 (presiding judge Yoon Sung-sik) acquitted him for both charges. On 20th, the prosecution gave up its appeal against Song Young-gil.

== Election results ==
Year	Election	Constituency	Party	% of Votes	Result
1999	June 1999 By-election	Gyeyang–Ganghwa A, Incheon	National Congress for New Politics	29,333 (41.80%)	Defeated (2nd)
2000	16th General Election	Gyeyang, Incheon	Millennium Democratic Party	53,292 (48.34%)	Won
2004	17th General Election	Gyeyang B, Incheon	Uri Party	34,706 (56.24%)	Won
2008	18th General Election	Gyeyang B, Incheon	United Democratic Party	23,731 (46.09%)	Won
2010	5th Local Election	Incheon (Mayoral Elections)	Democratic Party (2008)	556,902 (52.69%)	Won
2014	6th Local Election	Incheon (Mayoral Elections)	New Politics Alliance for Democracy	593,555 (48.21%)	Defeated (2nd)
2016	20th General Election	Gyeyang B, Incheon	Democratic Party (2015)	35,197 (43.29%)	Won
2020	21st General Election	Gyeyang B, Incheon	Democratic Party (2015)	51,821 (58.67%)	Won
2022	8th Local Election	Seoul (Mayoral Elections)	Democratic Party (2015)	1,718,426 (39.23%)	Defeated (2nd)
2024	22nd General Election	Seo A, Gwangju	Pine Tree Party	14,292 (17.38%)	Defeated (2nd)
2026	2026 By-election	Yeonsu A, Incheon	Democratic Party (2015)	51,823 (51.73%)	Won

== Recognition ==
- 2000 - Selected as the best National Assemblyman for Inspection of National Affairs
- 2001–2004 - Selected as the best National Assembly research groups

Ethical Politics Research Group Lawmakers to Nurture National Spirit Lawmakers for the National Interest and Culture

- 2003–2004 - Selected as the outstanding National Assembly research groups

Ethical Politics Research Group Lawmakers to Nurture National Spirit

- 2005–2008 - Selected as the outstanding National Assembly research group

Market Economy and Social Safety Net Forum (co-head)

- 2009 - Légion d'Honneur Chevalier, France
- 2010 - Proud Yonsei People Award, Yonsei University
- 2013 - Орден Дружбы, Russia
- 2016 - Selected as the outstanding National Assembly research

국민의 먹고사는 문제해결을 위한 의원연구모임 'Forum to better the livelihood of the people of Republic of Korea' (co-head)

- 2022 - Légion d'Honneur Officier, France

== Publications ==
- Song Young-gil (2003) Follow this Path like a Bull
- Song Young-gil (2009) Turning Walls into Doors
- Song Young-gil (2013) Rule the Rules – Song Young-gil’s Management Strategy for Coping in the Age of Survival Competition
- Song Young-gil (2014) Future Report on Incheon, the Economic Capital
- Song Young-gil (2015) Song Young-gil’s ‘Home for Everyone’ Project – A Shared Economy for an Awake and Inclusive Future
- Song Young-gil (2020) Song Young-gil’s Globe Diplomacy – The Round Defeats the Strong!
- Song Young-gil (2023) Song Young-gil’s Declaration of War

National Assembly of the Republic of Korea
Preceded by Ahn Sang-soo (Gyeyang–Ganghwa A, Incheon); Lee Gyong-jae (Gyeyang–Ganghwa B, Incheon)	Member of the National Assembly for Gyeyang (Incheon); 30 May 2000–29 May 2004	Succeeded by Shin Hack-yong Gyeyang A, Incheon); Himself (Gyeyang B, Incheon)
Preceded by Himself (Gyeyang, Incheon)	Member of the National Assembly for Gyeyang B (Incheon); 30 May 2004–26 April 2010	Succeeded by Lee Sang-kwon
Preceded by Choi Won-sik	Member of the National Assembly for Gyeyang B (Incheon); 30 May 2016–29 April 2022	Succeeded by Lee Jae Myung
Preceded by Park Chan-dae	Member of the National Assembly for Yeonsu A (Incheon); 4 June 2026–	Incumbent
Political offices
Preceded by Ahn Sang-soo	Mayor of Incheon; 1 July 2010–30 June 2014	Succeeded by Yoo Jeong-bok
Party political offices
Preceded by Lee Nak-yon; Kim Tae-nyeon (Acting); Do Jong-hwan (Interim); Yun Ho-jung (Interim)	Leader of the Democratic Party; 2 May 2021–10 March 2022	Succeeded by Yun Ho-jung, Park Ji-hyun (ERC); Park Hong-keun (Acting); Woo Sang-ho (Interim); Lee Jae Myung
