= Goesan County =

Coordinates: 36°48′39″N 127°47′41″E

Goesan
- County
- Panoramic view of Goesan-eup

- Flag Emblem of Goesan

- Location in South Korea
- Country: South Korea
- Region: Hoseo
- Administrative divisions: 1 eup and 10 myeon

Area
  - Total: 842 km^{2} (325 sq mi)

Population (September 2024)
  - Total: 36,021
  - Density: 52.8/km^{2} (137/sq mi)
  - Dialect: Chungcheong

Korean name
- Hangul: 괴산군
- Hanja: 槐山郡
- RR: Goesan-gun
- MR: Koesan-gun

Goesan County (Korean: 괴산군) is a county in North Chungcheong Province, South Korea.

== Demographics ==
As of 2021, Goesan-gun has a population of about 40,000 people. The area has been affected strongly by the graying of the South Korean population, and more than a third of residents are over the age of 65. Schools have closed as urbanization and falling birthrates in Korea have resulted in a declining number of children to attend them. One school, to prevent closure due to low enrollment, offers free housing to families with school-age children.

== Tourist spot ==
- Sanmagi-yetgil

Sanmagi-yetgil is a 5 km (3.1 mi) road that extends from Sao-rang-maeul village (Oe-sa-ri, Chilseong-myeon, Goesan-gun, Chungbuk) to Sanmagi village in the mountains. It is a stroll path restored to resemble the traditional mountain road with a picturesque landscape.

== Twin towns – sister cities ==
Goesan is twinned with:

=== Domestic ===
- Gwanak-gu, Seoul
- Gangnam-gu, Seoul
- Guro-gu, Seoul
- Jung-gu, Incheon
- Anyang, Gyeonggi
- Ansan, Gyeonggi
- Uiwang, Gyeonggi

=== International ===
- Ji'an, Jilin, China

== See also ==
- Geography of South Korea
- Chungcheong
