= 2020 Democratic Party (South Korea, 2015) leadership election =

2020 Democratic Party of Korea leadership election
- 29 August 2020
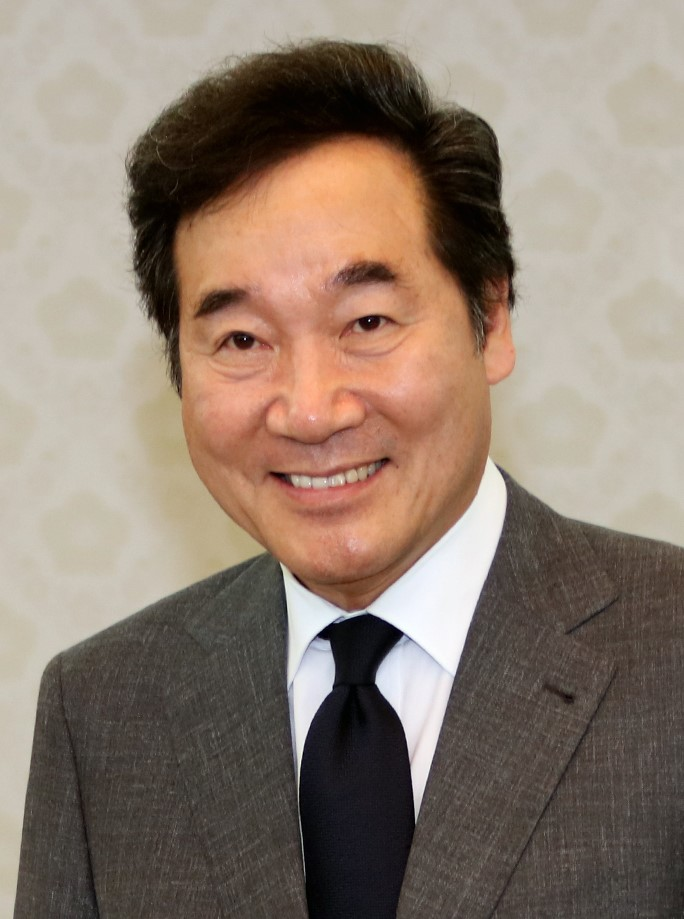

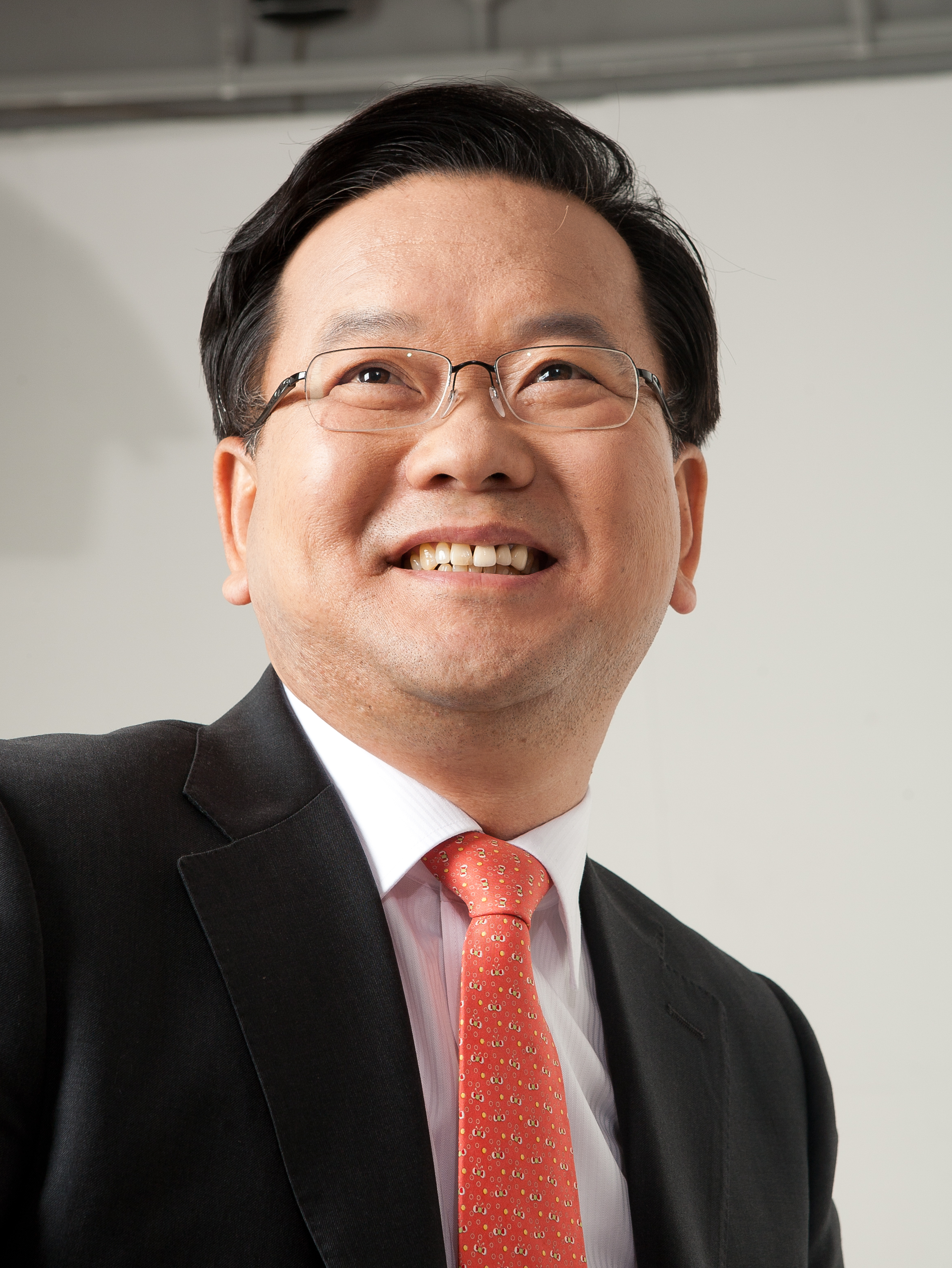

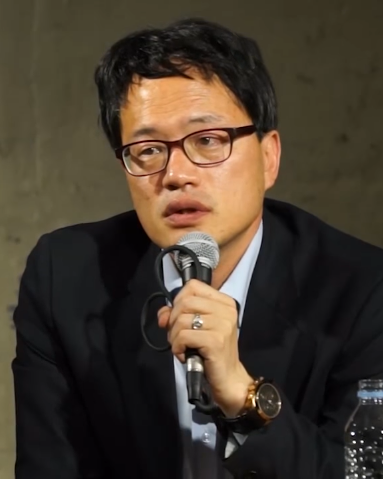
Candidate	Lee Nak-yon	Kim Boo-kyum	Park Joo-min
Delegates	57.20%	29.29%	13.52%
Party members	63.73%	14.76%	21.51%
Opinion poll	64.02%	13.85%	22.14%
Non-voting members poll	62.80%	18.05%	19.15%
Total	60.77%	21.37%	17.85%
Leader before election
Lee Hae-chan
Elected Leader
Lee Nak-yon

The Democratic Party held a leadership election on 29 August 2020. It was the second leadership election since the inauguration of President Moon Jae-in. Although an elected leader serves for the fixed two-year term, the newly elected leader Lee Nak-yon is unlikely to serve for two years due to his presumptive presidential campaign in 2022.

== Background ==
=== Landslide victory of 2020 General Election ===
In 2020 South Korean General Election, The Democrats, led by Lee Hae-chan, won the majority in the National Assembly by landslide. The Democratic Party and its affiliate Party, Platform Party, won 180 seats (60%) in the 300-seat Assembly. It was the biggest majority since the democratization of South Korea after the June Struggle in 1987. It was an endorsement of President Moon Jae-in's COVID-19 response that got a good reputation worldwide.

=== Coronavirus ===
Due to the continued impact of COVID-19 pandemic, the Democratic Party National Convention Preparatory Committee decided to hold a national convention online to elect its leadership. The Democratic Party originally planned an event in Jamsil Olympic Stadium in which about 600 members of the Central Committee attended, but it changed to an online event due to concerns about second wave of COVID-19. Eventually, the party decided to allow only about 50 candidates and staff at the Democratic Party's headquarter and broadcast the results of the election as well as the acceptance speech on the Internet on 29 August 2020.

== Candidates ==
=== Candidates for leader ===
==== Nominated ====
#	Candidate	Born	Political Office	Campaign	Announced
1	Lee Nak-yon	20 December 1951 (age 74); Yeonggwang, South Jeolla	41st Prime Minister of South Korea (2017–2020); 37th Governor of South Jeolla (2014–2017); Member of the National Assembly (2000–2014, 2020–present)	지금!이낙연 (Now!Lee Nak-yon)	7 July 2020
2	Kim Boo-kyum	21 January 1958 (age 68); Sangju, North Gyeongsang	Minister of the Interior and Safety (2017–2019); Member of the National Assembly (2016–2020)	책임지는 당대표 (Responsible Leader)	9 July 2020
3	Park Joo-min	21 November 1973 (age 52); Seongbuk, Seoul	Member of the Democratic Party Supreme Council (2018–2020); Member of the National Assembly (2016–present)	국민과 함께 두려움 없이 (With the people, fearlessly)	21 July 2020

=== Candidates for Supreme Council ===
==== Nominated ====
#	Candidate	Born	Political Office	Campaign Slogan	Announced
1	Shin Dong-kun	22 December 1961; Seo, Incheon	Member of the National Assembly (2016–present); Whip of the Democratic Party (2018–2019); Vice Chairman of the Policy Planning Committee (2016–2017)	민주당 왼쪽 미드필더 (Left Midfielder of Democrats)	22 July 2020
2	Yeom Tae-yeong	25 July 1960; Hwaseong, Gyeonggi	Mayor of Suwon (2010–present); Chairman of the National Association of Mayors (2019–2020)	기초가 든든한 100년 민주당 (Well-founded century Democrats)	20 July 2020
3	Yang Hyang-ja	4 April 1967; Hwasun, South Jeolla	Member of the National Assembly (2020–present); Director of the National Human Resources Development Institute (2018–2019); Chairwoman of the Democratic National Woman's Committee (2016–2018)	한 표는 경제에 (One vote for the economy)	21 July 2020
4	Han Byung-do	7 December 1967; Iksan, North Jeolla	Member of the National Assembly (2004–2008, 2020–present); Senior Political Officer of the Office of the President (2017–2019)	대통령을 지킬 한 표 (One vote to protect the president)	21 July 2020
5	So Byeong-hoon	3 June 1954; Gunsan, North Jeolla	Member of the National Assembly (2016–present); Vice Chairman of the Policy Planning Committee (2015)	소확행 (Small but sure Happiness, SSH)	21 July 2020
6	Noh Woong-rae	3 August 1957; Mapo, Seoul	Member of the National Assembly (2004–2008, 2012–present); Secretary-General of the Democratic Party (2014)	무한책임 일편黨心 (Infinite commitment, a sincere heart for the party)	20 July 2020
7	Lee Won-wook	20 March 1962; Boryeong, South Chungchoeng	Member of the National Assembly (2012–present); Whip of the Democratic Party (2019–2020)	민주당 답게! 흔들림 없이! (Like a Democrat! Without wavering!)	19 July 2020
8	Kim Jong-min	12 May 1964; Nonsan, South Chungcheong	Member of the National Assembly (2016–present); Vice Governor of South Chungcheong (2010–2011); Whip of the Democratic Party (2018–2019); Vice Chairman of the Policy Planning Committee (2016–2017); Spokesman of the Cheong Wa Dae (2004–2005)	정권재창출 반드시 해내겠습니다 (Make sure to win again)	21 July 2020

==== Eliminated ====
Candidate	Born	Political Office	Campaign Slogan	Announced
Lee Jae-jung	2 August 1974; Daegu	Member of the National Assembly (2016–present); Spokeswoman of the Democratic Party (2018-2020); Vice Chairman of the Policy Planning Committee (2017–2018)	당신을 빛나게 하는 힘! (The power that makes you shine!)	17 July 2020
Cheong Kwang-il				

In the election of the Supreme Council, 10 people were running, so the party had to eliminate 2 candidates and held the final election with the remaining 8 candidates according to the rules. On 24 July 2020, the Democratic Party held a caucus for the election of the party's Supreme Council by on-site and online voting. About 660 members of the Central Committee participated in the vote. As a result of the vote, Lee Won-wook, Noh Woong-rae, Kim Jong-min, So Byeong-hoon, Shin Dong-kun, Han Byung-do, Yang Hyang-ja, and Yeom Tae-yeong were nominated. However, the ranking and number of votes for each candidate were not released. Of the eight nominated candidates, five are finally elected through elections held at the National Assembly on 29 August. In addition, under the party's rule, at least one elected member of the Supreme Council shall be a woman. Yang Hyang-ja was the only remaining female candidate, so she was virtually elected as the Supreme Council member.

=== Those who announced that they will not run for this election ===
- Hong Young-pyo, former floor leader of the party and member of National Assembly
- Song Young-gil, former mayor of Incheon and member of National Assembly
- Woo Won-shik, former floor leader of the party and member of National Assembly

== Debates ==
=== Televised debates ===
No.	Date and time	Location	Programme	Broadcaster	Candidates			Link
P Participant A Absent invitee O Out of race (eliminated or withdrawn) N No debate					Lee Nak-yon	Kim Boo-kyum	Park Joo-min	Link
1	29 July 2020; 18:00	Daegu	민주당 당대표 후보 TV 토론회 (Democratic Leadership Debate)	Daegu MBC	P	P	P	YouTube
2	31 July 2020; 18:20	Busan	더불어민주당 당대표 후보자 초청 토론회 (Democratic Leadership Debate)	Busan MBC	P	P	P	YouTube
3	6 August 2020; 22:00	Jeonju	더불어민주당 당대표 후보 토론회 (Democratic Leadership Debate)	Jeonju MBC	P	P	P	YouTube
4	7 August 2020	Gwangju	더불어민주당 당대표 후보자 초청 토론회 (Democratic Leadership Debate)	KBC Gwangju	P	P	P	YouTube
5	19 August 2020; 17:20	Daejon	더불어민주당 당대표 후보자 초청 토론회 (Democratic Leadership Debate)	Daejon MBC	P	P	P	
6	20 August 2020	Seoul	100분토론 - 더불어민주당 당대표 후보자 토론회 (100 Minute Debate - Democratic Leadership Debate)	MBC	P	P	P	YouTube
7	27 August 2020	Seoul	더불어민주당 당대표 후보자 초청 방송토론회 (Democratic Leadership Debate)	KBS1	P	P	P	YouTube

== Results ==
The ratio of the results by sector was 45% for delegates, 40% for party members, 10% for opinion poll and 5% for non-voting members poll.

Full result - Leader
Candidates	Delegates (45%)	Party members (40%)	Opinion poll (10%)	Non-voting members poll (5%)	Total (100%)
Lee Nak-yon	57.20%	63.73%	64.02%	62.80%	60.77%
Kim Boo-kyum	29.29%	14.76%	13.85%	18.05%	21.37%
Park Joo-min	13.52%	21.51%	22.14%	19.15%	17.85%

Full result - Supreme Council
Candidate	Delegates (45%)	Party members (40%)	Opinion poll (10%)	Non-voting members poll (5%)	Total (100%)	Note
Kim Jong-min	13.54%	25.47%	23.9%	24.08%	19.88%	Senior member
Yeom Tae-yeong	16.88%	9.9%	12.29%	8.95%	13.23%	
Noh Woong-rae	12.29%	12.75%	16.48%	17.88%	13.17%	
Shin Dong-kun	9.62%	13.79%	16.68%	12.98%	12.16%	
Yang Hyang-ja	7.14%	15.56%	13.32%	15.18%	11.53%	
Lee Won-wook	17.39%	6.93%	5.69%	5.28%	11.43%	
Han Byung-do	13.81%	9.77%	5.69%	8.93%	11.14%	
So Byeong-hoon	9.33%	5.84%	5.89%	6.75%	7.47%	
