= Park Chun-ran =

South Korean politician

- 박춘란

President of National Human Resource Management Institute
- In office 1 October 2019 – 14 June 2021
- President: Moon Jae-in
- Minister: Hwang Seo-chong; Kim Woo-ho
- Preceded by: Yang Hyang-ja
- Succeeded by: Choi Chang-won

Vice Minister of Education
- In office 31 May 2017 – 23 November 2018
- President: Moon Jae-in
- Prime Minister: Lee Nak-yeon
- Minister: Kim Sang-gon; Yoo Eun-hae
- Preceded by: Lee Young
- Succeeded by: Park Baek-beom

Personal details
- Born: 1965 (age 60–61) Goseong County, South Gyeongsang, South Korea
- Education: Seoul National University; UC Berkeley

Park Chun-ran (Korean: 박춘란; Hanja: 朴春蘭; born 1965) is a South Korean bureaucrat previously served as President Moon Jae-in's first Vice Minister of Education from 2017 to 2018 and his second head of National Human Resource Management Institute from 2019 to 2021. Park is the first woman to ever become the deputy head of the Ministry of Education or its preceding agencies which dates back to 1948.

Before becoming the Vice Minister of Education in May 2017, she was the deputy Superintendent of Seoul Office of Education from July 2016 and previously North Chungcheong Office of Education from December 2014.

After passing the state exam in 1989, she dedicated her career in public service - mostly at the Ministry or its preceding agency. In 2005 she became its head of University Affairs Bureau - the youngest to assume this managerial level at the entire South Korean government at the age of 40.

Park also led Office of General Administration at Kyungpook National University and Gangneung–Wonju National University respectively.

After leaving the public service as the Vice Minister in 2018, she was brought back to fulfill the role of President of National Human Resource Management Institute - a vice-ministerial role emptied by Yang Hyang-ja for her 2020 general election.

Park holds two degrees in law - a bachelor from Seoul National University and a master's from UC Berkeley School of Law.
