= Lee Gae-ho =

South Korean politician (born 1959)

- 이개호
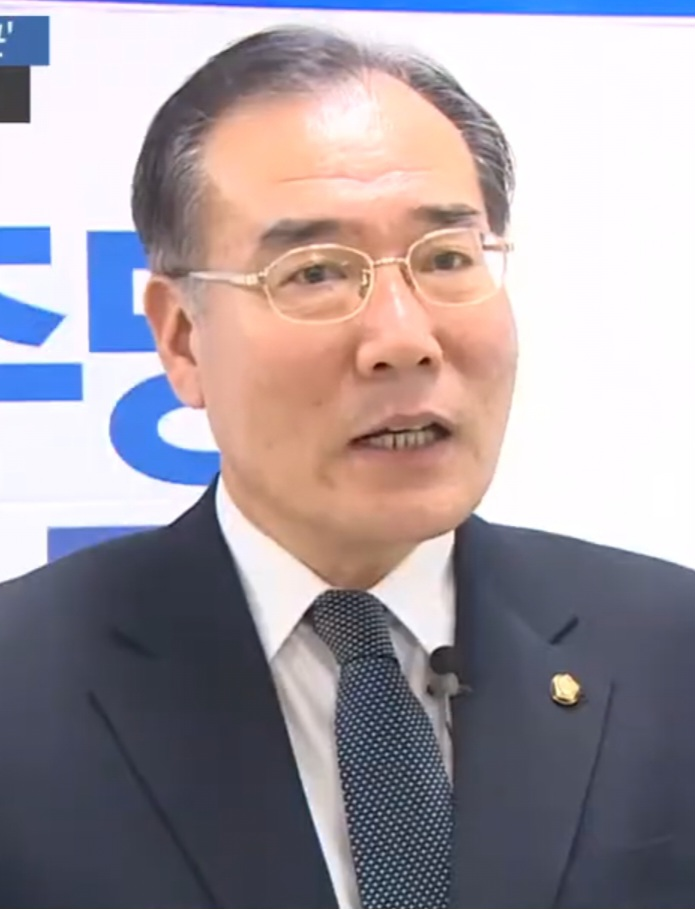

Minister of Agriculture, Food and Rural Affairs
- In office 10 August 2018 – 30 August 2019
- President: Moon Jae-in
- Prime Minister: Lee Nak-yon
- Preceded by: Kim Yung-rok
- Succeeded by: Kim Hyeon-soo

Member of the National Assembly
- Incumbent
- Assumed office 31 July 2014
- Preceded by: Lee Nak-yon
- Constituency: Jeonnam Damyang–Hampyong–Yeonggwang–Jangseong

Personal details
- Born: 23 June 1959 (age 67) Damyang, South Jeolla Province, South Korea
- Party: Democratic
- Education: Chonnam National University (BBA, 1982)
- Alma mater: Chonnam National University

Korean name
- Hangul: 이개호
- Hanja: 李介昊
- RR: I Gaeho
- MR: I Kaeho

Lee Gae-ho (Korean: 이개호; born 23 June 1959) is a South Korean politician who previously served as Minister of Agriculture, Food and Rural Affairs under President Moon Jae-in. He is also a three-term parliamentarian representing a district previously held by former Prime Minister Lee Nak-yon.

After passing the state exam in 1980 and before running for by-election in 2014, he has spent most of his career at South Jeolla (Jeonnam) Province government.

In the 2020 general election, his victory was the first out of 253 constituencies to be confirmed by the electoral commission. In 2020 he was elected as the chair of National Assembly's Agriculture, Food, Rural Affairs, Oceans and Fisheries Committee responsible for scrutinising Ministry of Agriculture, Food and Rural Affairs, Ministry of Oceans and Fisheries and related agencies.

He holds a bachelor's degree in management from Chonnam National University.

On 15 April 2021, Lee was tested positive for COVID-19. He became the 1st incumbent MP tested positive for COVID-19.

== Electoral history ==
Election	Year	District	Party affiliation	Votes	Percentage of votes	Results
2014 By-election	2014	Jeonnam Damyang–Hampyong–Yeonggwang–Jangseong	NPAD	40,170	81.31%	Won
20th National Assembly General Election	2016	Jeonnam Damyang–Hampyong–Yeonggwang–Jangseong	Democratic Party	48,371	49.84%	Won
21st National Assembly General Election	2020	Jeonnam Damyang–Hampyong–Yeonggwang–Jangseong	Democratic Party	86,315	81.95%	Won
22nd National Assembly General Election	2024	Jeonnam Damyang–Hampyong–Yeonggwang–Jangseong	Democratic Party	61,042	56.46%	Won

== Awards ==
- Order of Service Merit by the government of South Korea (2003)
