= 2021 Democratic Party (South Korea, 2015) leadership by-election =

- 2 May 2021
Candidate	Song Young-gil	Hong Young-pyo	Woo Won-shik
Delegates	34.97%	33.47%	31.56%
Party members	35.95%	36.62%	27.43%
Opinion poll	34.70%	37.36%	27.94%
Non-voting members poll	40.38%	31.41%	28.22%
Total	35.60%	35.01%	29.38%
Leader before election
Yun Ho-jung
(interim)
Elected Leader
Song Young-gil

The Democratic Party held its leadership by-election on 2 May 2021 following the resignation of the incumbent Lee Nak-yon in March 2021. Lee stepped down from party leader due to party rule which bans any party contender for president from holding party position at least for a year before the presidential election.

Newly-elected leader of the party will serve for the remainder of Lee's term which ends in August 2022 and may replace two unelected members of the Supreme Council currently held by Park Seong-min and Park Hong-bae who were appointed by Lee in 2020. They will also command party's campaign in the 20th presidential election in March 2022 and the 8th local election in June 2022.

Immediately after the party's loss in 2021 South Korean by-elections, all members of its Supreme Council decided to resign. The date for its leadership by-election was also decided as 2 May to elect its new party leader as earliest as possible. Few days later, it was decided that members of the Supreme Council will be elected on the same day after party members complained about not having their votes in new members of Supreme Council.

== Candidates ==
=== Candidates for leader ===
1. Hong Young-pyo, a member of the National Assembly from Incheon(Bupyeong B) and a former floor leader
2. Song Young-gil, a member of the National Assembly from Incheon(Gyeyang B) and a former mayor of Incheon, unsuccessfully run in 2018 leadership election
3. Woo Won-shik, a member of the National Assembly from Seoul(Nowon B) and a former floor leader

==== Eliminated ====
- Chung Han-do, a member of Yongin City Council

=== Candidates for Supreme Council ===
1. Kang Byung-won, a member of the National Assembly from Seoul(Eunpyeong B)
2. Hwang Myung-sun, incumbent, three-term mayor of Nonsan City
3. Kim Yong-min, a member of the National Assembly from Namyangju City(Namyangju C)
4. Jun Hye-sook, a member of the National Assembly from Seoul(Gwangjin A)
5. Suh Sam-suk, a member of the National Assembly from South Jeolla Province(Yeongam–Muan–Sinan) and a former three-term mayor of its Muan County
6. Back Hye-ryun, a member of the National Assembly from Suwon City(Suwon B)
7. Kim Young-bae, a member of the National Assembly from Seoul(Seongbuk A) and a former two-term mayor of Seoul's Seongbuk District

== Results ==
The ratio of the results by sector was 45% for delegates, 40% for party members, 10% for opinion poll and 5% for non-voting members poll.

Full result - Leader
Candidates	Delegates (45%)	Party members (40%)	Opinion poll (10%)	Non-voting members poll (5%)	Total (100%)
Song Young-gil	34.97%	35.95%	34.70%	40.38%	35.60%
Hong Young-pyo	33.47%	36.62%	37.36%	31.41%	35.01%
Woo Won-shik	31.56%	27.43%	27.94%	28.22%	29.38%

Full result - Supreme Council
Candidate	Delegates (45%)	Party members (40%)	Opinion poll (10%)	Non-voting members poll (5%)	Total (100%)	Note
Kim Yong-min	12.42%	21.59%	23.87%	22.28%	17.73%	
Kang Byung-won	14.64%	20.24%	17.23%	17.48%	17.28%	
Back Hye-ryun	16.45%	17.44%	19.81%	17.04%	17.21%	
Kim Young-bae	14.35%	12.71%	12.17%	14.08%	13.46%	
Jun Hye-sook	13.88%	11.20%	10.23%	11.50%	12.32%	
Suh Sam-suk	13.60%	9.95%	5.87%	8.48%	11.11%	
Hwang Myung-sun	14.67%	6.87%	10.84%	9.15%	10.89%	
