= Yang Hyang-ja =

South Korean politician

- 양향자
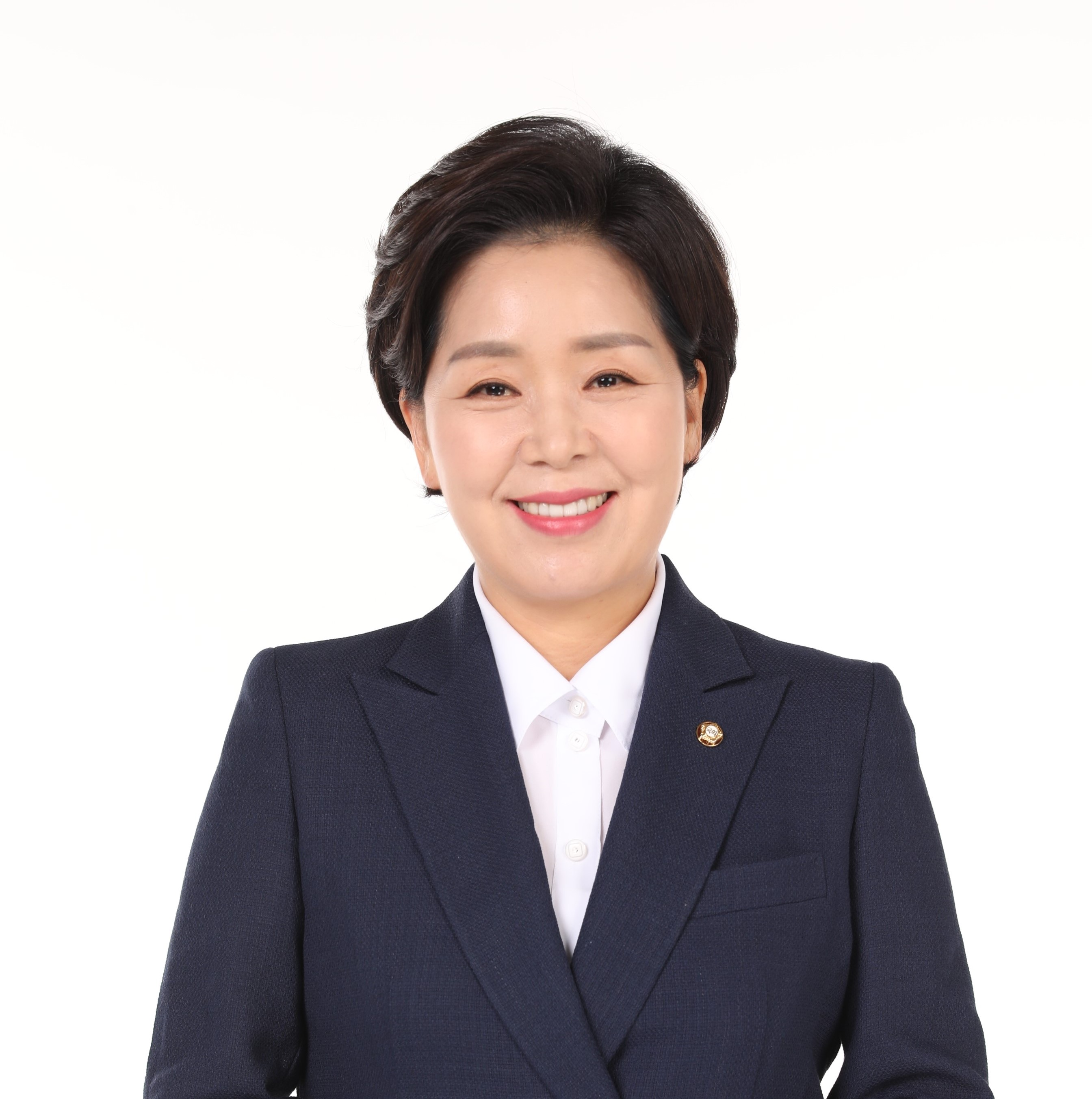
- Yang in 2026

President of National Human Resource Management Institute
- In office 31 August 2018 – 1 August 2019
- President: Moon Jae-in
- Prime Minister: Lee Nak-yon
- Preceded by: Oh Dong-ho
- Succeeded by: Park Chun-ran

Member of the National Assembly
- In office 30 May 2020 – 29 May 2024
- Preceded by: Chun Jung-bae
- Succeeded by: Yang Bu-nam
- Constituency: Gwangju Seo B

Personal details
- Born: 4 April 1967 (age 59) Hwasun County, South Jeolla Province, South Korea
- Party: PPP (since 2025)
- Other political affiliations: DPK (2016–2021); Independent (2021–2023); HoK (2023–2024); RP (2024–2025)
- Education: Cyber University of Korea; Sungkyunkwan University

Yang Hyang-ja (Korean: 양향자; Hanja: 梁香子; born 4 April 1967) is a South Korean politician and former Samsung executive. She represented Gwangju at the National Assembly between 2020 and 2024. A former member of the Democratic Party, she founded the Hope of Korea party in 2023.

Yang previously served as the president of the National Human Resource Management Institute (NHI) within the Ministry of Personnel Management under President Moon Jae-in from 2018 to 2019. She was the first woman to lead the Institute since the position was founded in the 1960s.

== Samsung Electronics ==
After graduating from Gwangju Girls' Commercial High School, Yang went to Samsung Electronics at the age of 18 (or 19 in Korea) as an assistant to semiconductor memory researchers at the company. Since then she had worked for the company's departments related to memory semi-conductors for over three decades. In 2014 she was promoted to the executive for its flash memory development becoming its first female executive without higher education, from Honam region and one-year earlier than her co-workers.

Yang completed tertiary education while working at Samsung. She earned a bachelor's degree from now-Cyber University of Korea, which was co-founded by Samsung in 2000, in 2005 and masters from Sungkyunkwan University, which has close partnerships with Samsung, in 2008.

== Political career ==
Yang was recruited by then-party leader Moon Jae-in in late 2015. She resigned from Samsung in December 2015 for her political career which began in 2016 when she officially became member of Democratic Party and later nominee for Gwangju constituency at the 2016 general election. After losing her election, Yang continued her commitment to politics. She was one of five elected members of Supreme Council of party for two years before resigning for the president of the NHI in August 2018. After serving as the first woman president of the NHI for a year, she resigned for the upcoming 2020 election.

In 2020 general election, Yang defeated six-term parliamentarian Chun Jung-bae becoming the only woman representing a district in Honam region. She is expected to join her party's Supreme Council again as she is the only woman running for this post and at least one woman should be elected. In August 2020 she re-joined the Supreme Council receiving fifth most votes.

In September newly elected leader of her party, Lee Nak-yon, appointed Yang and Han Jeoung-ae as the co-deputy chair of party's K-New Deal Committee led by party floor leader Kim Tae-nyeon. From September she also chairs party's task force for economy and people's livelihood.

On 15 July 2021, Yang was expelled from the Democratic Party for her handling of sexual misconduct in her office. A female employee of Yang's regional office in Gwangju complained of sexual harassment by Yang's cousin, who also worked at the office. Yang then inflicted second punishment by gaslighting the victim, ignoring the complaints, and denying the situation in interviews.

In June 2023, Yang introduced the launch of her own political party, Hope of Korea. Yang has urged the United States to abandon its global semiconductor industry policies.

In 2025, Yang declared her candidacy in the People Power Party primary for the 2025 South Korean presidential election, but lost in the primaries held by the People Power Party.

== Electoral history ==
=== General elections ===
Elections	Year	District	Party affiliation	Votes	Percentage of votes	Results
20th National Assembly General Election	2016	Gwangju Seo B	Democratic Party	24,603	31.48%	Lost (2nd)
21st National Assembly General Election	2020	Gwangju Seo B	Democratic Party	61,279	75.83%	Won
22nd National Assembly General Election	2024	Gyeonggi Yongin A	Reform Party	4,543	3.21%	Lost (3rd)

=== Local elections ===
==== Governor of Gyeonggi ====
Year	Elections	Constituency	Political party	Votes (%)	Remarks
2026	9th Iocal Election	Gyeonggi (Governoral Elections)	People Power Party	2,689,879 (39.37%)	Lost (2nd)

== Published works ==
Yang's biography, Fly Towards Dream Beyond Dream, Hyang-ja
