= Lee Mi-kyung (politician) =

South Korean politician

- 이미경
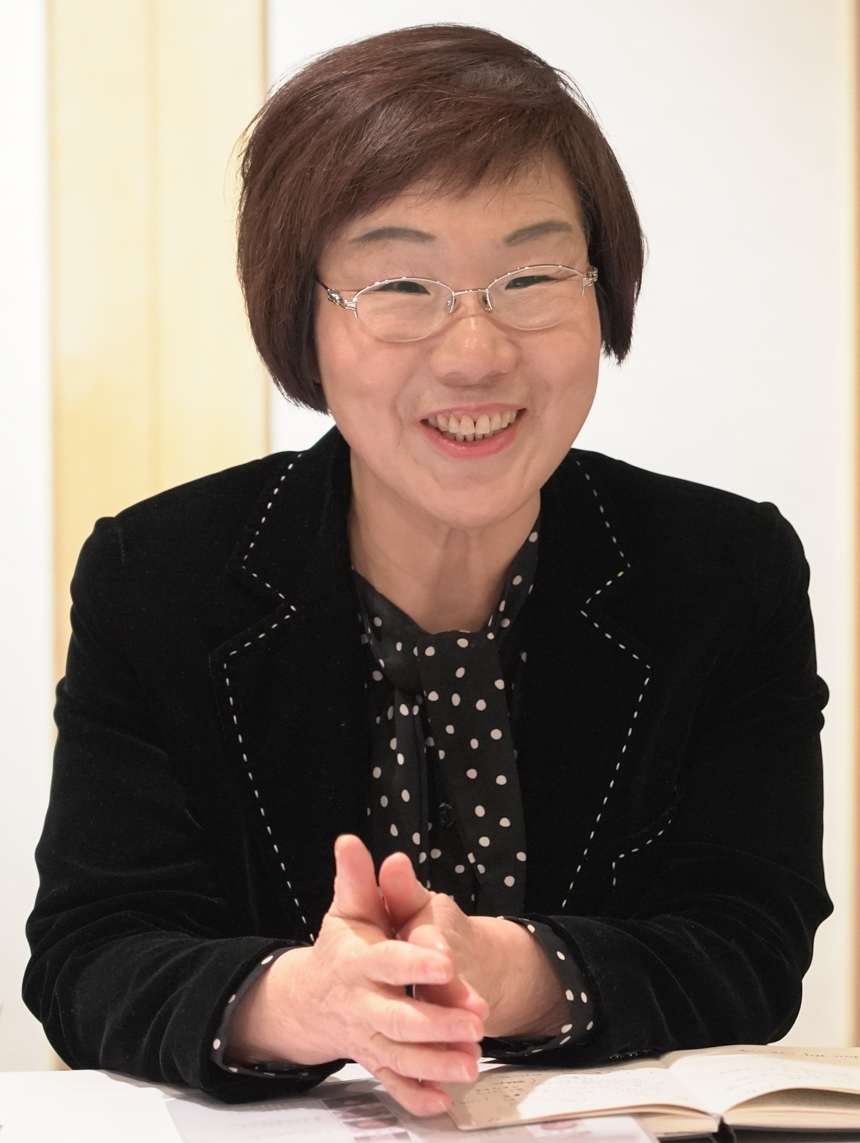

President of Korea International Cooperation Agency
- In office 28 November 2017 – 30 November 2020
- President: Moon Jae-in
- Prime Minister: Lee Nak-yon; Chung Sye-kyun
- Preceded by: Kim In-sik
- Succeeded by: Son Huck-sang

Member of National Assembly
- In office 30 May 2004 – 29 May 2016
- Preceded by: Kang In-sop
- Succeeded by: Park Joo-min
- Constituency: Seoul Eunpyeong A
- In office 30 May 1996 – 29 May 2004
- Constituency: proportional representation

Personal details
- Born: 2 September 1950 (age 76) Busan, South Korea
- Party: Democratic
- Education: Ewha Womans University
- Grandchildren: lee-ju-eun

Korean name
- Hangul: 이미경
- Hanja: 李美卿
- RR: I Migyeong
- MR: I Migyŏng

Lee Mi-kyung (Korean: 이미경; Hanja: 李美卿; born 2 September 1950) is a South Korean politician and women's right activist who previously served as the head of KOICA, Korea International Cooperation Agency under President Moon Jae-in from 2017 to 2020. She is the first woman to lead the Agency as well as one of four women who served five or more terms in the National Assembly.

Before assuming the current role, Lee worked for roughly twenty years each at civil society and parliament.

She revealed that her career as a feminist activist started when she participated in creating women's studies course at her university funded by United States Agency for International Development in 1977 during her speech at Global Engagement & Empowerment Forum on Sustainable Development in 2019. At the same occasion, she also praised the German aid organisation, EZE (now-EED, Evangelischer Entwicklungsdienst) for providing financial assistance in founding women's organisation, now-Korean Women Link, in 1982. After serving as the first co-vice-chair and chair of now-Korean Women Link until 1986, she led Korean Women's Associations United as its vice president and chair for a decade. She also was high ranking member of The Korean Council for the Women Drafted for Military Sexual Slavery by Japan from 1990 to 1996. From 1994 to 1995 she was the co-chair of Korean Women's NGO Committee for Beijing World Conference on Women working with current Foreign Minister Kang Kyung-wha, then-its spokesperson.

Lee first entered politics via proportional representation of conservative United Democratic Party, a preceding party of People Power Party. Due to her voting records, she was removed from her party and later joined liberal Democratic Party, a preceding party of Democratic Party of Korea. From 2000 to 2008 Lee took high-ranking role in her parties including the first secretary-general of Democratic Party succeeded by then Assembly member Lee Nak-yeon. From 2012 to 2016 Lee was the co-president of Parliamentarians for Nuclear Non-Proliferation and Disarmament and chair of its Korean branch. After failed to be nominated to run for re-election in 2016 general election from her party, she took high-level role in Moon's presidential campaign in 2017.

Lee graduated from Ewha Girls' High School and Ewha Womans University where she earned her undergraduate degree in English language and literature and postgraduate degree in political science and diplomacy. From September 2016 to August 2017 she was the visiting professor at Graduate School of Policy Studies at her alma mater.

== Electoral history ==
Election	Year	District	Party affiliation	Votes	Percentage of votes	Results
15th National Assembly General Election	1996	National (2nd)	United Democratic Party	2,207,695	11.20%	Elected
16th National Assembly General Election	2000	Proportional representation (8th)	Millennium Democratic Party	6,780,625	35.87%	Elected
17th National Assembly General Election	2004	Seoul Eunpyeong A	Uri Party	50,785	51.78%	Won
18th National Assembly General Election	2008	Seoul Eunpyeong A	Democratic Party	33,638	45.82%	Won
19th National AssemblyGeneral Election	2012	Seoul Eunpyeong A	Democratic United Party	42,672	49.05%	Won
