= Eunpyeong A =

Constituency in Seoul, South Korea

- Single-member constituency for the National Assembly
- Location of the constituency
- District(s): Eunpyeong District (part)
- Region: Seoul
- Electorate: 219,044 (2024)

Current constituency
- Created: 1988
- Seats: 1
- Party: Democratic Party
- Member: Park Joo-min
- Created from: Seodaemun–Eunpyeong

Eunpyeong A (Korean: 은평구 갑) is a constituency of the National Assembly of South Korea. The constituency consists of parts of Eunpyeong District, Seoul. As of 2024, 219,044 eligible voters were registered in the constituency. The constituency was created in 1988 from the Seodaemun–Eunpyeong constituency.

== History ==
Since its establishment, Eunpyeong A has elected members of the Democratic Party and predecessor parties in all but two elections and is thus regarded as a stronghold for the Democratic Party.

Oh Yu-bang of the right-wing Democratic Justice Party was the first member to represent the constituency, narrowly defeating Cho Dong-hoe of the Peace Democratic Party. Oh was succeeded by Son Sae-il of the centrist-liberal Democratic Party after losing re-election in the 1992 election. Son won re-election in 1996, defeating Kang In-sop of the centre-right Grand National Party. Son was defeated by Kang In-sop in the following election by a margin of around 5,000 votes, marking the last time a conservative party candidate won in Eunpyeong A. In the 2004 election, Lee Mi-kyung of the liberal Uri Party won the seat, securing 51.79% of the vote. Lee won re-election in 2008 and 2012, receiving 45.82 and 49.05% of the vote respectively.

Ahead of the 2016 South Korean legislative election, the Democratic Party then led by Kim Chong-in, did not re-nominate incumbent Lee Mi-kyung for the Eunpyeong A constituency. The party instead nominated lawyer Park Joo-min as its candidate on March 20, 2016. Park went on to win the general election with 54.93% of the vote, defeating opponents Choi Hong-jae and Choi Sang-hyeon of the Saenuri Party and Labor Party respectively. Park won re-election in a landslide in 2020, securing 64.29% of the vote and defeating United Future Party opponent Hong In-jung. The 2024 election saw rematch between incumbent Park Joo-min and Hong In-jung; Park won re-election with 60.78% of the vote.

== Boundaries ==
The constituency consists of the neighborhoods of Nokbeon-dong, Yeokchon-dong, Jeungsan-dong, Sinsa-dong, Eungam-dong, Susaek-dong. It borders the constituencies of Eunpyeong B to the north, Goyang B to the west, Mapo B to the southwest, Seodaemun B to the south, and Jongno to the east.

== List of members of the National Assembly ==
Election	Member	Party	Dates	Notes
1988	Oh Yu-bang	Democratic Justice	1988–1992	
1992	Son Sae-il	Democratic	1992–2000	Floor leader of the National Congress (1999)
1996	Son Sae-il	National Congress	1992–2000	Floor leader of the National Congress (1999)
2000	Kang In-sop	Grand National	2000–2004	Senior Secretary for Political Affairs (1997)
2004	Lee Mi-kyung	Uri	2004–2016	Secretary General of the Democratic Party (2008–2010)
2008	Lee Mi-kyung	United Democratic	2004–2016	Secretary General of the Democratic Party (2008–2010)
2012	Lee Mi-kyung	Democratic United	2004–2016	Secretary General of the Democratic Party (2008–2010)
2016	Park Joo-min	Democratic	2016–present	
2020	Park Joo-min	Democratic	2016–present	
2024	Park Joo-min	Democratic	2016–present	

== Election results ==
=== 2024 ===
Legislative Election 2024: Eunpyeong A
Party	Candidate	Votes	%	±%
Democratic	Park Joo-min	89,379	60.78	▼3.51
People Power	Hong In-jung	57,661	39.21	▲5.27
Rejected ballots		2,115	–	
Turnout		149,155	68.09	▲2.49
Registered electors		219,044		
Democratic hold		Swing		

=== 2020 ===
Legislative Election 2020: Eunpyeong A
Party	Candidate	Votes	%	±%
Democratic	Park Joo-min	86,351	64.29	▲9.36
United Future	Hong In-jung	45,589	33.94	▼6.94
Minsaeng	Han Woong	1,551	1.15	new
National Revolutionary	Noh Byung-heon	819	0.60	new
Rejected ballots		1,439	–	
Turnout		135,749	65.6	▲9.8
Registered electors		206,917		
Democratic hold		Swing		

=== 2016 ===
Legislative Election 2016: Eunpyeong A
Party	Candidate	Votes	%	±%
Democratic	Park Joo-min	57,767	54.93	▲5.88
Saenuri	Choi Hong-jae	42,991	40.88	▼0.58
Labor	Choi Sang-hyeon	4,401	4.18	new
Rejected ballots		11,649	–	
Turnout		116,808	55.8	▲4.65
Registered electors		209,352		
Democratic hold		Swing		

=== 2012 ===
Legislative Election 2012: Eunpyeong A
Party	Candidate	Votes	%	±%
Democratic United	Lee Mi-kyung	42,672	49.05	▲3.23
Saenuri	Choi Hong-jae	36,071	41.46	▲4.69
Independent	Lee Jae-sik	4,539	5.21	new
New Progressive	Ahn Hyo-sang	3,704	4.25	new
Rejected ballots		713	–	
Turnout		87,699	51.15	▲8.23
Registered electors		171,466		
Democratic United hold		Swing		

=== 2008 ===
Legislative Election 2008: Eunpyeong A
Party	Candidate	Votes	%	±%
United Democratic	Lee Mi-kyung	33,638	45.82	new
Grand National	Ahn Byung-yong	26,993	36.77	▲2.32
Pro-Park	Kang In-sop	6,877	9.36	new
Liberty Forward	Cho Il-ho	2,721	3.70	new
Democratic Labor	Kang Hwa-yeon	2,045	2.78	new
Family Party for Peace and Unity	Lee Sang-jae	573	0.78	new
Independent	Oh Soon-deok	560	0.76	new
Rejected ballots		494	–	
Turnout		73,901	42.92	▼16.26
Registered electors		173,326		
United Democratic hold		Swing		

=== 2004 ===
Legislative Election 2004: Eunpyeong A
Party	Candidate	Votes	%	±%
Uri	Lee Mi-kyung	50,785	51.79	new
Grand National	Kang In-sop	33,783	34.45	▼9.0
Millennium Democratic	Hwang Jung-yeon	7,221	7.36	▼30.37
Independent	Kim Hae-up	3,379	3.45	new
National Integration 21	Kim Sin-ho	2,429	2.48	▼4.43
Democratic Republican	Bong Tae-hong	464	0.47	new
Rejected ballots		887	–	
Turnout		98,948	59.18	▲7.27
Registered electors		167,207		
Uri gain from Grand National		Swing		

=== 2000 ===
Legislative Election 2000: Eunpyeong A
Party	Candidate	Votes	%	±%
Grand National	Kang In-sop	35,316	43.45	▲7.72
Millennium Democratic	Son Sae-il	30,671	37.73	new
Independent	Kim Sin-ho	5,618	6.91	new
United Liberal Democrats	Lee Keun-bong	3,719	4.57	▼4.83
Youth Progressive	Cho Kyu-sik	3,088	3.79	new
Democratic People's	Nam Yo-won	2,862	3.52	new
Rejected ballots		798	–	
Turnout		82,072	51.91	▼16.48
Registered electors		158,117		
Grand National gain from Millennium Democratic		Swing		

=== 1996 ===
Legislative Election 1996: Eunpyeong A
Party	Candidate	Votes	%	±%
National Congress	Son Sae-il	37,045	38.86	new
New Korea	Kang In-sop	34,058	35.73	▼0.66
Democratic	Chang Doo-hwan	11,717	12.29	new
United Liberal Democrats	Lim In-chae	8,967	9.40	new
Non-Partisan National Association	Song Chang-dal	2,090	2.19	new
Independent	Lee Rae-won	1,440	1.51	–
Rejected ballots		1,218	–	
Turnout		96,535	68.39	▼0.48
Registered electors		163,774		
National Congress hold		Swing		

=== 1992 ===
Legislative Election 1992: Eunpyeong A
Party	Candidate	Votes	%	±%
Democratic	Son Sae-il	42,361	39.77	new
Democratic Liberal	Oh Yu-bang	38,759	36.39	new
Unification National	Lim In-chae	19,105	17.93	new
Independent	Na Kang-su	6,285	5.90	new
Rejected ballots		1,089	–	
Turnout		107,599	68.87	▲0.09
Registered electors		156,231		
Democratic gain from Democratic Liberal		Swing		

=== 1988 ===
Legislative Election 1988: Eunpyeong A
Party	Candidate	Votes	%	±%
Democratic Justice	Oh Yu-bang	30,687	31.80	–
Peace Democratic	Cho Dong-hoe	29,127	30.19	–
Reunification Democratic	Oh Sang-hyun	23,644	24.50	–
New Democratic Republican	Song Ji-hyun	9,555	9.90	–
Hankyoreh Democratic	Song Jang-dal	2,139	2.21	–
Our Justice	Son Ga-myung	832	0.86	–
New Korean Democratic	Hwang Sung	487	0.50	–
Rejected ballots		871	–	
Turnout		97,342	68.78	–
Registered electors		141,534		
Democratic Justice win (new seat)				

== See also ==
- List of constituencies of the National Assembly of South Korea
