= Kim Yung-rok =

South Korean politician (born 1956)

- 김영록
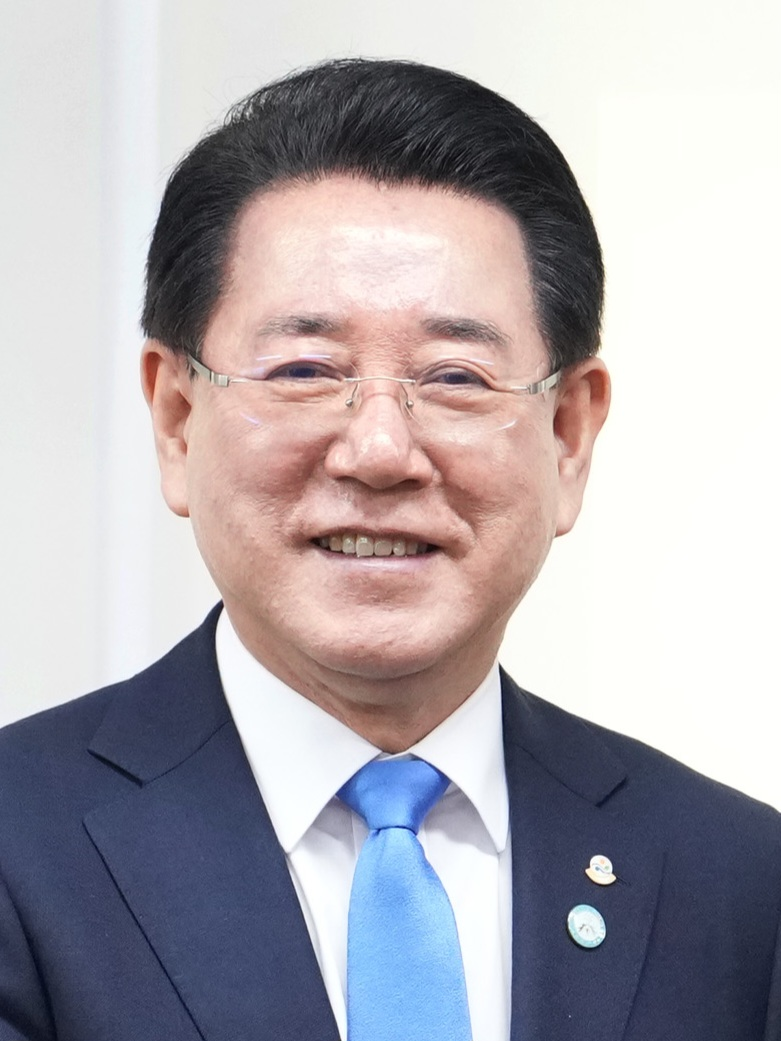

Governor of South Jeolla Province
- In office 1 July 2018 – 30 June 2026
- Preceded by: Lee Nak-yon; Kim Gap-seop (acting); Lee Jae-young (acting)
- Succeeded by: Min Hyung-bae (as Mayor of Jeonnam-Gwangju)

Minister of Agriculture, Food and Rural Affairs
- In office 3 July 2017 – 15 March 2018
- President: Moon Jae-in
- Prime Minister: Lee Nak-yon
- Preceded by: Kim Jae-su
- Succeeded by: Lee Gae-ho

Member of the National Assembly
- In office 30 May 2008 – 29 May 2016
- Preceded by: Chae Il-byung (Haenam–Jindo, South Jeolla); Lee Young-ho (Gangjin–Wando, South Jeolla)
- Succeeded by: Yoon Young-il
- Constituency: Haenam–Jindo–Wando (South Jeolla)

Personal details
- Born: 17 February 1956 (age 70) Wando, South Jeolla Province, South Korea
- Party: Democratic
- Education: Konkuk University; Syracuse University
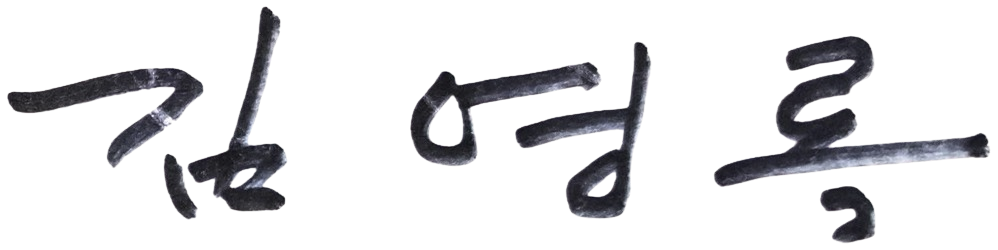
- Signature
- Website: Kim Yung-rok's Blog

Korean name
- Hangul: 김영록
- Hanja: 金瑛錄
- RR: Gim Yeongrok
- MR: Kim Yŏngnok

Kim Yung-rok (Korean: 김영록; born 17 February 1956) is a South Korean politician who served as the Governor of South Jeolla Province from 2018 to 2026. A member of the Democratic Party of Korea (DPK), he previously served as a member of the National Assembly from 2008 to 2016 and as the Minister of agriculture from 2017 to 2018.

== Life ==
Kim Yung-rok was born in Wando County, South Jeolla Province on February 17, 1955.

Kim entered public office after passing the 21st administrative examination and he was elected to the Member of the National Assembly in 2008. And He was appointed Minister of Agriculture, Food and Rural Affairs in 2017 and later resigned in March 2018 to be elected to governor of South Jeolla Province.

== Election results ==
=== General elections ===
Year	Elections	Constituency	Political party	Votes (%)	Results
2008	18th National Assembly General Election	Haenam–Wando–Jindo (South Jeolla)	Independent	36,827 (50.49%)	Won
2012	19th National Assembly General Election	Haenam–Wando–Jindo (South Jeolla)	DUP	44,085 (56.04%)	Won
2016	20th National Assembly General Election	Haenam–Wando–Jindo (South Jeolla)	Democratic	36,684 (41.24%)	Defeated (2nd)

=== Local elections ===
==== Governor of South Jeolla ====
Year	Elections	Constituency	Political party	Votes (%)	Remarks
2018	7th Iocal Election	South Jeolla (Governoral Elections)	Democratic	807,902 (77.08%)	Won
2022	8th Iocal Election	South Jeolla (Governoral Elections)	Democratic	672,433 (75.74%)	Won
