= Hong Jung-min =

South Korean politician (born 1978)

- 홍정민

Member of the National Assembly
- In office 30 May 2020 – 29 May 2024
- Preceded by: Yoo Eun-hae
- Succeeded by: Lee Ki-heon
- Constituency: Gyeonggi Goyang C

Personal details
- Born: 24 November 1978 (age 47) Anyang, South Korea
- Party: Democratic
- Education: Seoul National University

Korean name
- Hangul: 홍정민
- Hanja: 洪貞敏
- RR: Hong Jeongmin
- MR: Hong Chŏngmin

Hong Jung-min (Korean: 홍정민; born 24 November 1978) is a South Korean politician, lawyer and start-up company founder.

After graduating from Seoul National University, she worked at Samsung Fire & Marine Insurance where she had to quit after four years due to pressure received for her marital status and child. She went back to her university for master's degree in economics. In 2008 she passed the Bar exam while taking care of her children as a stay-at-home parent. She then went back to her Alma mater again for her doctorate degree. In 2014 she completed her training at the Judicial Research and Training Institute. From 2014 she worked at Samsung Economic Research Institute where she was promoted to its youngest department head. In 2018 she quit the private think tank and founded the Al-based legal service startup company.

She is also active in academia as a board member of Korea Law and Economics Association from 2017, the legal counsel to the Korea Fintech Industry Association from 2019 and Korean Association for Artificial Intelligence and Law from 2019.

She was recruited by the ruling party, Democratic Party of Korea, for the 2020 general election. She was assigned to the constituency previously held by its two-term parliamentarian and current Deputy Prime Minister Yoo Eun-hae. In the election, she defeated the four-term parliamentarian and a former minister, Kim Young-hwan. She is now the deputy floor spokesperson of her party.

She has three degrees, from undergraduate to doctorate, in economics from Seoul National University.

== Electoral history ==
Election	Year	District	Party affiliation	Votes	Percentage of votes	Results
21st National Assembly General Election	2020	Gyeonggi Goyang C	Democratic Party	80,068	54.26%	Won
