= Hope of Korea =

2023–2024 political party in South Korea

Hope of Korea 한국의희망 韓國의希望
- Leader: Yang Hyang-ja
- Secretary-General: Kim Beop-jeong
- Floor Leader: Yang Hyang-ja
- Founded: 28 June 2023
- Registered: 28 August 2023
- Dissolved: 24 January 2024
- Split from: Democratic Party
- Merged into: New Reform Party
- Headquarters: Gukhoe-daero, Yeongdeungpo, Seoul
- Colours: Orange

Website
- www.hopeofkorea.com (archived)

Hope of Korea (HoK; Korean: 한국의희망; Hanja: 韓國의希望; RR: Hangugui huimang) was a political party in South Korea. The Party focused on scientific politics, technocracy, and pragmatism.

The party was established by Parliamentarian Yang Hyang-ja on 28 July 2023. On July 15, 2021, Yang was expelled from the Democratic Party for her handling of sexual misconduct in her office. A female employee of Yang's regional office in Gwangju complained of sexual harassment by Yang's cousin, who also worked there. Yang then inflicted second punishment by gaslighting the victim, ignoring the complaints, and denying the situation in interviews.

The Party was expected to run in the 2024 South Korean legislative election.

As of 20 July 2023, the Party still needed to complete the requirements to become a legal party under the rules of the National Elections Commission.

The Party was officially registered to the National Election Commission with 1 member of parliament on 28 August 2023.

On 24 January 2024, Yang merged her Party into Lee Jun-seok's newly created New Reform Party ahead of the April 10 parliamentary election.

== Logo controversy ==
Hope of Korea's authentication as a political party was stalled in July 2023 due to a complaint about the party's logo. The minor Open Democratic Party expressed displeasure and filed a complaint to the National Elections Commissions after claiming that Hope of Korea was using a logo too similar to the Open Democratic Party's logo. In response to the statement, Yang Hyang-ja's office refuted the opinion of the Open Democratic Party, saying that the shape of the door is common in design, and the key is the person crossing through the door.

The Party officially completed all requirements and was registered on 28 August 2023.
