= National Human Resources Development Institute =

Government agency situated in South Korea

- 국가공무원인재개발원

Agency overview
- Formed: January 1, 2016
- Preceding agencies: National Officials Training Institute (1949–1961); Central Officials Training Institute (1961–2016)
- Headquarters: Gwacheon, Jincheon
- Employees: 156
- Agency executive: Choi Chang Won, President
- Parent agency: Ministry of Personnel Management
- Website: www.nhi.go.kr

Korean name
- Hangul: 국가공무원인재개발원
- Hanja: 國家公務員人材開發院
- RR: Gukga gongmuwon injae gaebarwon
- MR: Kukka kongmuwŏn injae kaebarwŏn

The National Human Resources Development Institute (Korean: 국가공무원인재개발원) is a South Korean government agency under the jurisdiction of the Ministry of Personnel Management responsible for the education and training of civil servants. It was established on January 1, 2016 to replace the Central Officials Training Institute.

== Bibliography ==
- Act on the Capacity Development of Public Officials (13696). National Assembly of South Korea. December 29, 2015.
- 인사혁신처와 그 소속기관 직제 시행규칙: [별표 3] 국가공무원인재개발원 공무원 정원표 [Enforcement Regulations of the Ministry of Personnel Management and Its Affiliated Organizations: [Appendix 3] National Public Officials Human Resources Development Institute Public Official Quota Table] (Report). Ministry of Government Legislation. April 27, 2021.
- Yoon, Byeong-soo (2017). "New Strategies to Develop Human Resources in the Public Sector: A Focus on the Transition from the COTI to NHI". International Journal of Civil Service Reform and Practice. 2 (2). Astana: Regional Hub of Civil Service. ISSN 2409-5532.
