= Back Hye-ryun =

South Korean politician (born 1967)

- 백혜련

Member of the National Assembly
- Incumbent
- Assumed office 30 May 2016
- Constituency: Gyeonggi Suwon B

Personal details
- Born: 17 February 1967 (age 59) Jangheung, South Korea
- Party: Democratic
- Education: Korea University

Back Hye-ryun (Korean: 백혜련; Hanja: 白惠蓮; born 17 February 1967) is a South Korean prosecutor-turned parliamentarian.

From 2000, she worked as a state prosecutor. In 2011, she resigned the post to publicly criticise political favouritism of Prosecution Service towards the Lee Myung-bak government. In 2012, she became the member of then-opposition party, Democratic United Party.

After winning the election in 2016, she took several roles in her party such as its deputy floor leader from May 2016 to May 2017 and its spokesperson from May 2017 to August 2018. From October 2018, she has led the women's committee of her party. As an ex-prosecutor, her legislative agenda focused on reforming the prosecution service.

On 2 May 2021, Back was elected one of five elected members of the Supreme Council of her party receiving third most votes among seven candidates.

Back holds a bachelor's degree in sociology from Korea University.

== Electoral history ==
Election	Year	District	Party affiliation	Votes	Percentage of votes	Results
2014 By-election	2014	Gyeonggi Suwon B	New Politics Alliance for Democracy	23,964	38.20%	Lost (2nd)
20th National Assembly General Election	2016	Gyeonggi Suwon B	Democratic Party	50,982	47.14%	Won
21st National Assembly General Election	2020	Gyeonggi Suwon B	Democratic Party	84,500	60.68%	Won
22nd National Assembly General Election	2024	Gyeonggi Suwon B	Democratic Party	86,677	61.73%	Won
