= Kim Suk-hee =

South Korean former Second Lady and painter

- 김숙희

Second Lady of South Korea
- In office 31 May 2017 – 14 January 2020
- Prime Minister: Lee Nak-yon
- Preceded by: Choi Ji-young
- Succeeded by: Choi Hye-kyung

Personal details
- Born: 1956 (age 69–70) Jeonju, South Korea
- Spouse: Lee Nak-yon
- Education: Ewha Womans University

Kim Suk-hee (Korean: 김숙희; born 1956), also known as Kim Sook-hee, is a South Korean Western painting artist and former art teacher. She previously served as the Second Lady of South Korea from 2017 to 2020, during which her spouse, Lee Nak-yon, served as the Prime Minister of South Korea.

== Biography ==
Kim attended Ewha Womans University, wherein she obtained a bachelor's degree in painting and a master's degree in fine arts education. After finishing her undergraduate studies, she began to pursue a career in teaching art. She worked at various public schools in Seuol for over two decades until she retired in 2000.

After retirement, she held her first solo art exhibition, citing her fear of not being able to paint due to deteriorating eyesight as the motivation. However, after Kim's spouse was designated as the Prime Minister by President Moon Jae-in, there was a controversy that one of her paintings in the exhibition was overpaid for in order to appease him. However, this was contested by members of affiliated art institutions, such as Kim Young-seok, Chairman of the Korea Art Appraisal Association, and Lee Hwa-ik, President of the Galleries Association of Korea. citing her experience, size of the paintings, and the fact that it was purchased 11 months before her spouse become the elected Governor of Jeonnam Province.

Honorary titles
Preceded by Choi Ji-young	Second Lady of South Korea; 2017–2020	Succeeded by Choi Hye-kyung
