= 2018 Democratic Party (South Korea, 2015) leadership election =

- 25 August 2018
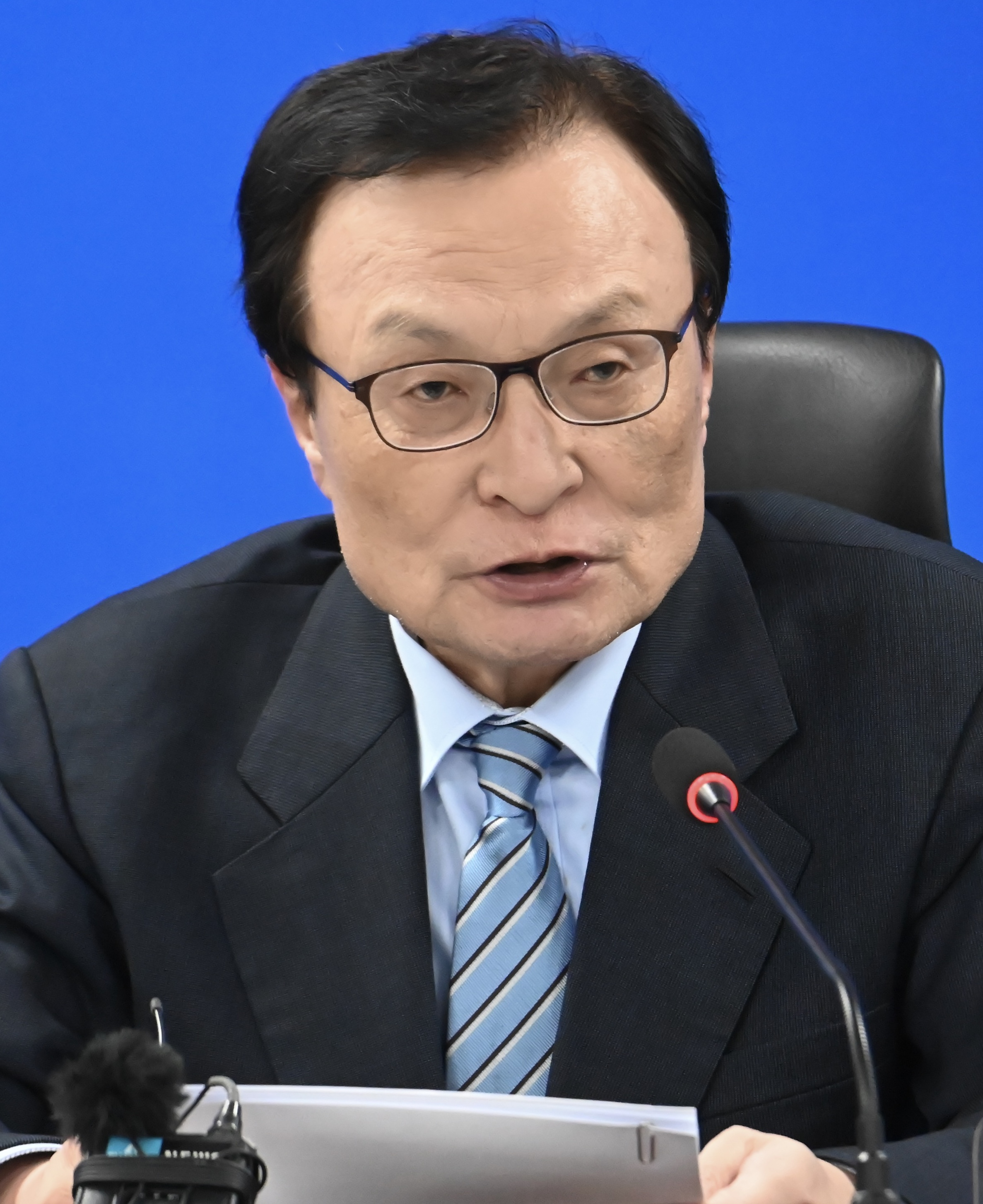

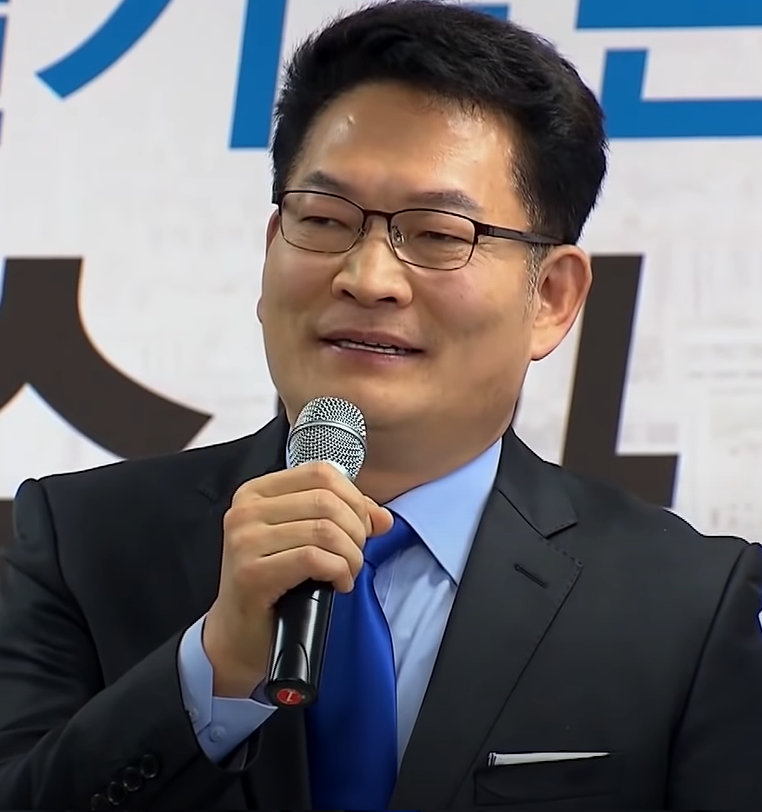

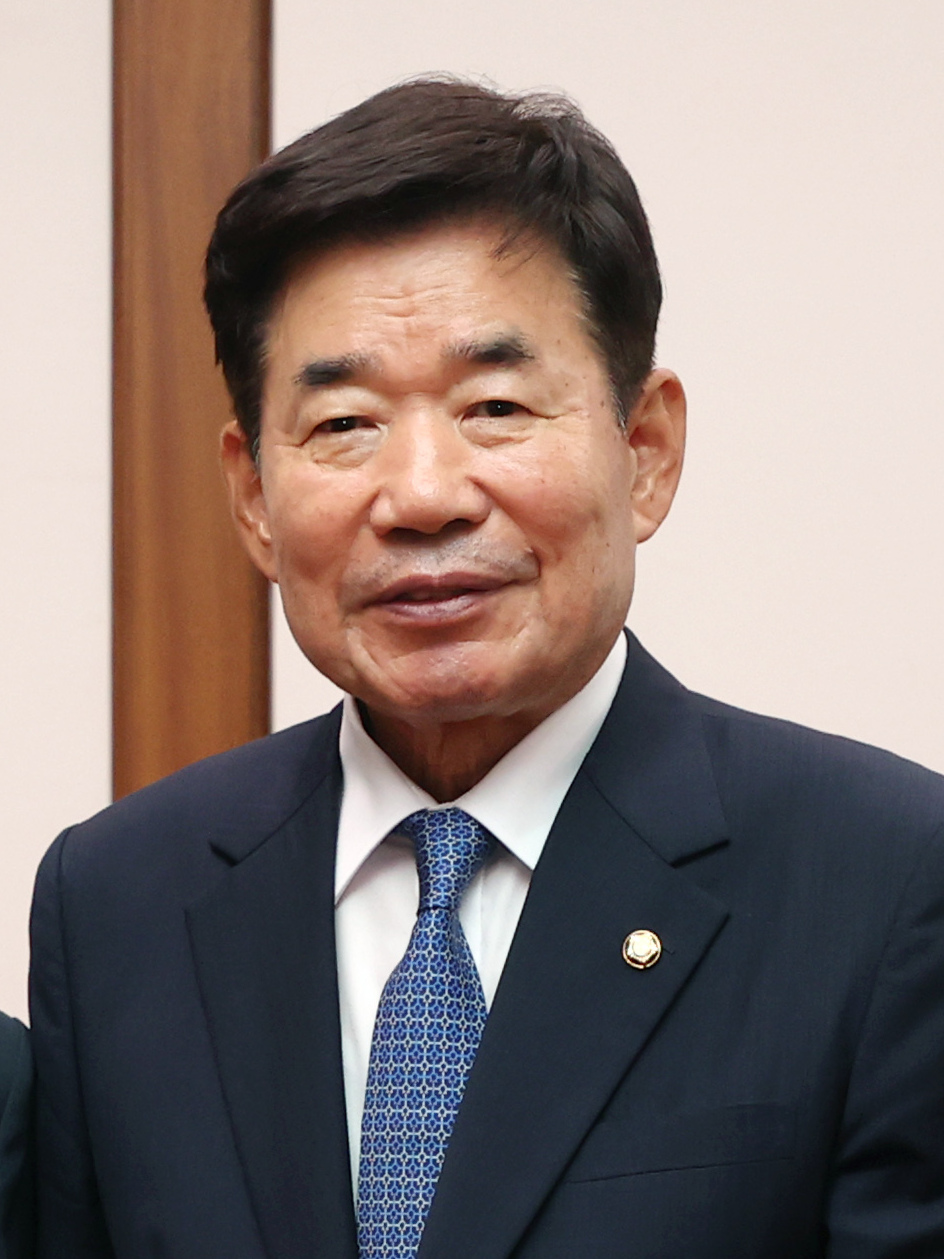
Candidate	Lee Hae-chan	Song Young-gil	Kim Jin-pyo
Delegates	40.57%	31.96%	27.48%
Party members	45.79%	28.67%	25.54%
Opinion poll	44.03%	30.61%	25.37%
Non-voting members poll	38.20%	36.30%	25.50%
Total	42.88%	30.73%	26.39%
Leader before election
Choo Mi-ae
Elected Leader
Lee Hae-chan

The Democratic Party held a leadership election on 25 August 2018. It was the first leadership election since the inauguration of President Moon Jae-in. The elected leader was slated to serve a 2-year term.

== Candidates ==
=== Dropped out ===
- Lee Jong-kul, member of the National Assembly, former Floor leader of the party.
- Choi Jae-sung, member of the National Assembly, former Secretary-General of the party.
- Kim Doo-kwan, member of the National Assembly, former governor of South Gyeongsang Province.
- Lee In-young, member of the National Assembly.
- Park Beom-kye, member of the National Assembly.

=== Advance to the finals ===
- Lee Hae-chan, member of the National Assembly, former leader of the party, former Prime Minister of South Korea, former Minister of Education.
- Kim Jin-pyo, member of the National Assembly, former Floor leader of the party, former Minister of Education and Human Resources Development, former Minister of Finance and Economy.
- Song Young-gil, member of the National Assembly, former mayor of Incheon.

== Results ==
The ratio of the results by sector was 45% for delegates, 40% for party members, 10% for opinion poll and 5% for non-voting members' poll.

Final results
Candidates	Delegates (45%)	Party members (40%)	Opinion poll (10%)	Non-voting members poll (5%)	Total (100%)
Lee Hae-chan	40.57%	45.79%	44.03%	38.20%	42.88%
Song Young-gil	31.96%	28.67%	30.61%	36.30%	30.73%
Kim Jin-pyo	27.48%	25.54%	25.37%	25.50%	26.39%
