= Kim Tae-nyeon =

South Korean politician

- 김태년
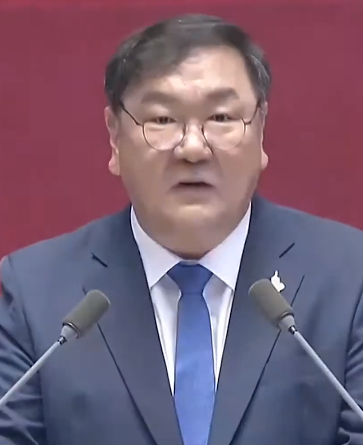
- Kim in 2020

Leader of the Democratic Party
- Acting
- In office 9 March 2021 – 8 April 2021
- Preceded by: Lee Nak-yon
- Succeeded by: Do Jong-hwan (Interim)

Floor Leader of the Democratic Party
- In office 7 May 2020 – 8 April 2021
- Preceded by: Lee In-young
- Succeeded by: Kim Young-jin (acting); Yun Ho-jung

Member of the National Assembly for Seongnam Sujeong (Gyeonggi)
- Incumbent
- Assumed office 30 May 2012
- Preceded by: Shin Yeong-su
- In office 30 May 2004 – 29 May 2008
- Preceded by: Lee Yoon-soo
- Succeeded by: Shin Yeong-su

Personal details
- Born: 20 March 1965 (age 61) Suncheon, South Korea
- Party: Democratic
- Other political affiliations: MDP (2000–2002); NPPR (2002–2003); Uri (2003–2007); UNDP (2007–2008); UDP (2008); Democratic (2008–2011); DUP (2011–2013); Democratic (2013–2014); NPAD (2014–2015)
- Spouse: Kim Mi-yeon
- Education: Kyung Hee University
- Occupation: Politician

Kim Tae-nyeon (Korean: 김태년, born 20 March 1965) is a South Korean politician and former activist who previously served as the parliamentary leader of the Democratic Party of Korea (DPK). He was the acting President of the party from 9 March to 8 April 2021. He is also the Member of the National Assembly for Seongnam Sujeong (2004–2008; 2012–).

== Early life ==
Kim Tae-nyeon was born in Suncheon, South Jeolla in 1965. His father was a cobbler while his mother was a fish seller at a market. He attended Suncheon High School and obtained a bachelor's and a master's degree in public administration at Kyung Hee University. His early dream was to be a journalist.

== Career ==
Kim used to be the President of the Student Council at Kyung Hee University Suwon Campus, as well as a member of the Association of National University Student Representatives. He led a student movement during the June Struggle. Other than these, he also led various local movement in Seongnam.

=== Political career ===
He was brought to the Millennium Democratic Party (MDP) by the then President Kim Dae-jung in 2000. In 2003, he left the MDP and formed the National Political Party for Reform (NPPR) that was later merged into the Uri Party, along with Rhyu Si-min. He, however, helped the MDP presidential candidate Roh Moo-hyun during the presidential election in December.

Kim was firstly elected to the National Assembly in 2004 election, defeating the GNP candidate Kim Eul-dong with a majority of 13.7%. Being just 39-year-old, he was the youngest MP-elected at the election. He was appointed one of the deputy parliamentary leaders of the Uri Party in February 2007. He lost to Shin Yeong-su in 2008 election by 129 votes majority.

Kim successfully made a comeback in 2012 election, receiving 54.76% and defeated Shin. In 2017 presidential election, he helped the Democratic presidential candidate Moon Jae-in.

In May 2019, Kim contested the party's election for parliamentary leadership but lost to Lee In-young. On 7 May 2020, he contested again and was elected the parliamentary leader of the Democratic Party.

On 9 March 2021, Kim became the acting President of the Democratic Party following the resignation of Lee Nak-yon, which was considered to run for the upcoming presidential election. However, he resigned on 8 April following the party's huge suffer in the 2021 by-elections.

== Controversies ==
On 22 January 2018, Kim provoked a controversy when he sent a note to the Minister of Employment and Labour Kim Young-joo. The note was saying, "Don't make an issue of Suncheon Job World. Kim Tae-nyeon's business." The same day, he also made a mistake when he said that the 2018 Winter Olympics would be held in Pyongyang.

On 5 October, during the celebration of 11th anniversary of the 2007 North–South Summit Declaration held in Pyongyang, he was told by Ri Son-gwon, "Don't task financial issues to a big belly".

== Election results ==
Year	Elections	Constituency	Political party	Votes (%)	Remarks
2004	17th National Assembly General Election	Seongnam Sujeong (Gyeonggi)	Uri	47,478 (43.94%)	Won
2008	18th National Assembly General Election	Seongnam Sujeong (Gyeonggi)	UDP	29,833 (38.54%)	Defeated (2nd)
2012	19th National Assembly General Election	Seongnam Sujeong (Gyeonggi)	DUP	51,142 (54.76%)	Won
2016	20th National Assembly General Election	Seongnam Sujeong (Gyeonggi)	Democratic	44,653 (44.57%)	Won
2020	21st National Assembly General Election	Seongnam Sujeong (Gyeonggi)	Democratic	76,830 (60.31%)	Won
2024	22nd National Assembly General Election	Seongnam Sujeong (Gyeonggi)	Democratic	80,835 (58.41%)	Won
