= Hong Young-pyo =

South Korean politician

- 홍영표
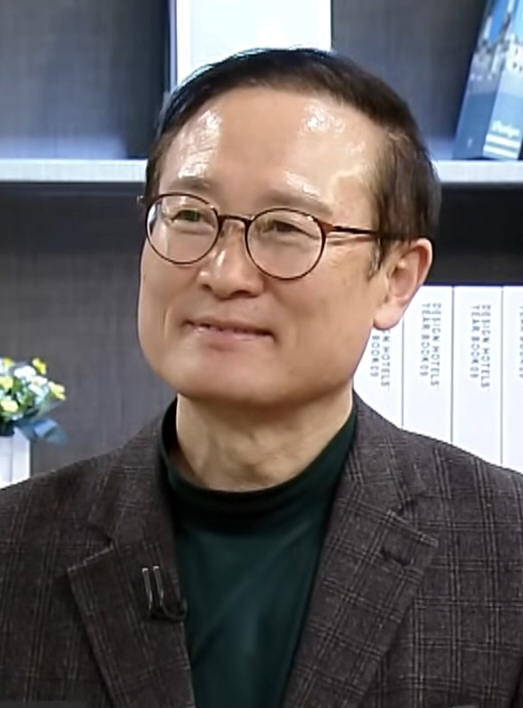

Floor Leader of Democratic Party
- In office 11 May 2018 – 8 May 2019
- Preceded by: Woo Won-shik
- Succeeded by: Lee In-young

Member of the National Assembly
- In office 30 April 2009 – 29 May 2024
- Preceded by: Koo Bon-chul
- Succeeded by: Park Sun-won
- Constituency: Incheon Bupyeong B

Personal details
- Born: 30 April 1957 (age 69)
- Party: Independent
- Other political affiliations: Democratic (until 2024)
- Education: Dongguk University

Hong Young-pyo (Korean: 홍영표; Hanja: 洪永杓; born 30 April 1957) is a South Korean politician representing Incheon Bupyeong District at the National Assembly from 2009.

== Before entering politics ==
He led the first labour strike of South Korean Chaebol in 1985. In 1982 he started working at Daewoo Motors (now General Motors)'s factory in Bupyeong as its welder as part of his endeavor as a student activist to initiate grassroots movement for democracy among labourers. In April 1985, its trade union decided to go on strike after being offered only 5.7% increase in wages - considerably small increase compared to their demand, 18.7%, to compensate increased productivity and to meet the minimum cost of living. Although he was not part of its trade union's leadership, Hong negotiated the terms with the chairman of the group, Kim Woo-jung, which lasted for 4 days and concluded with 16.4% increase with improved benefits. This was well above 9.9% imposed by the authoritarian regime of Chun Doo-hwan. He was imprisoned for this strike but was later pardoned.

== Political career ==
After returning from the UK where he worked at Daewoo Motors's overseas branch, he joined the People's Solidarity for Participatory Democracy in 2001. In 2002 he founded the "People's Party for Reform" (Korean: 개혁국민정당), with Rhyu Si-min and other political supporters of Roh to support Roh's presidency. He joined Uri Party after his party was unofficially absorbed into Uri Party. In the 2004 general election, he failed to earn his party's nomination for Incheon Bupyeong A constituency.

He then worked for Lee Hae-chan, then-Prime Minister under President Roh, as his secretary for civil societies and resolved complicated regional conflict issues such as finalising the location for nuclear waste disposal facility and planning Camp Humphreys. After Lee resigned, he was reshuffled to now-Ministry of Economy and Finance as the head of its committee to support KORUS FTA and to arrange its domestic policies.

In the 2008 general election, he ran for Bupyeong B constituency but lost to opposition party candidate, Koo Bon-chul. In 2009 he ran again and won after the court found Koo guilty for not abiding to the campaign law. In 2012 he worked for Han Myeong-sook, then-party leader, as her chief of staff. He later joined Moon Jae-in's first presidential campaign as its head of situation room. In 2017 he joined Moon's second presidential campaign as its chair of jobs committee.

He has served as the chair of Environment and Labor Committee of National Assembly from 2016 to 2018. In the final year as the chair, Hong negotiated with major parties to reduce the maximum working hours from 68 to 52 hours. He also negotiated the terms for furloughed employees of closed factory of General Motors in Gunsan as the chair of his party's special task force on this factory closure.

In 2017 he ran for his party's floor leadership but lost to Woo Won-shik. In the following year he ran again and won earning votes from 78 out of 116 democratic lawmakers. As floor leader of the ruling party, he formed coalition with the opposition parties apart from now-United Future Party to form the enough votes in parliament to pass the law for "reforms" on prosecution service and election laws.

In 2021 he announced his campaign for the leader of the democratic party in its leadership by-election. He lost to Song Young-gil by less than 1% margin.

== Personal life and education ==
Hong is a grandson of a member of the advisory council to the governor-general of Korea which facilitated Japanese colonial rule over Korea. However, Hong led the enactment of Special Law on Asset Confiscation for Pro-Japanese and Anti-national Collaborators to the State and publicly apologised for his grand father's contribution to Japanese colonial rule. When the candidate from now-United Future Party, attempted to use this to discredit Hong in the 2016 general election, associations of independence activists and their descendants endorsed Hong and their leadership even joined his campaign.

Hong holds two degrees from Dongguk University - a bachelor in philosophy and a master's in administration. He also completed a doctorate programme on administration from his alma mater.

== Electoral history ==
Election	Year	Constituency	Party affiliation	Votes	Percentage of votes	Results
18th National Assembly General Election	2008	Incheon Bupyeong B	United Democratic Party	33,707	38.15%	Lost (2nd)
2009 By-election	2009	Incheon Bupyeong B	Democratic Party (2008)	30,667	49.54%	Won
19th National Assembly General Election	2012	Incheon Bupyeong B	Democratic United Party	63,099	55.24%	Won
20th National Assembly General Election	2016	Incheon Bupyeong B	Democratic Party (2015)	54,974	43.77%	Won
21st National Assembly General Election	2020	Incheon Bupyeong B	Democratic Party (2015)	74,264	56.13%	Won
22nd National Assembly General Election	2024	Incheon Bupyeong B	New Future Party	11,399	8.25%	Lost (3rd)

== Awards ==
- Order of Service Merit by the government of South Korea
