= Lee Nak-yon =

Prime Minister of South Korea from 2017 to 2020

- 이낙연
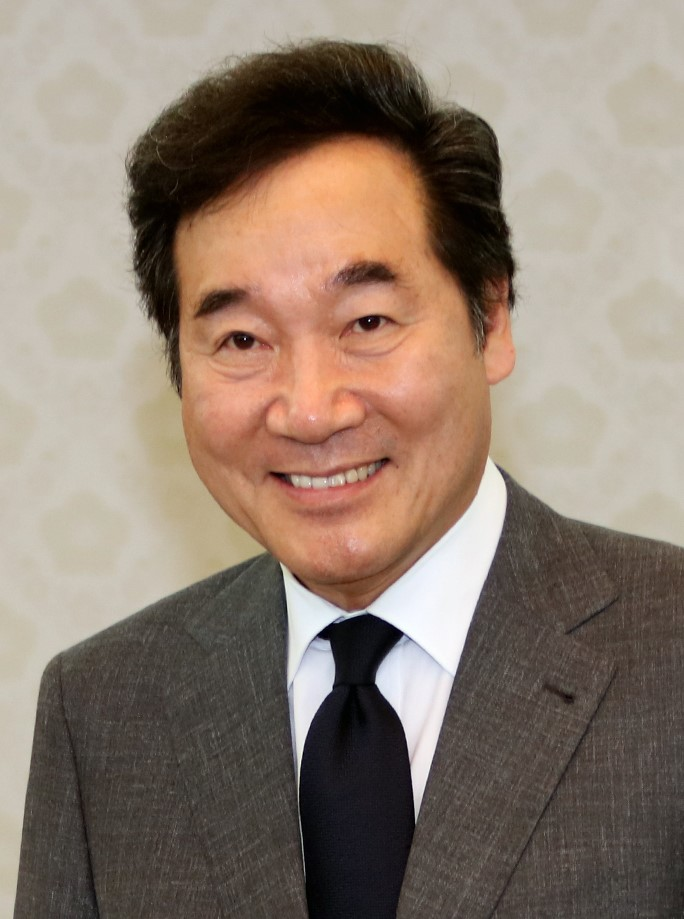
- Lee in 2017

Leader of the New Future Party
- In office 4 February 2024 – 18 April 2024 Co-leading with Kim Jong-min
- Preceded by: Party established
- Succeeded by: Lee Seok-hyun (acting); Jun Byung-hun

Leader of the Democratic Party
- In office 29 August 2020 – 9 March 2021
- Preceded by: Lee Hae-chan
- Succeeded by: Kim Tae-nyeon (acting); Yun Ho-jung (acting); Do Jong-hwan (interim); Song Young-gil

45th Prime Minister of South Korea
- In office 31 May 2017 – 14 January 2020
- President: Moon Jae-in
- Deputy: Kim Dong-yeon; Kim Sang-gon; Yoo Eun-hae; Hong Nam-ki
- Preceded by: Hwang Kyo-ahn; Yoo Il-ho (acting)
- Succeeded by: Chung Sye-kyun

Governor of South Jeolla Province
- In office 1 July 2014 – 12 May 2017
- Preceded by: Park Jun-young
- Succeeded by: Kim Gap-seop (acting); Lee Jae-young (acting); Kim Yung-rok

Member of the National Assembly
- In office 30 May 2020 – 15 September 2021
- Preceded by: Chung Sye-kyun
- Succeeded by: Choi Jae-hyung
- Constituency: Seoul – Jongno
- In office 30 May 2000 – 15 May 2014
- Preceded by: Kim In-gon
- Succeeded by: Lee Gae-ho
- Constituency: South Jeolla Province – Damyang, Hampyeong, Yeonggwang and Jangseong

Personal details
- Born: 20 December 1951 (age 74) Yeonggwang South Jeolla, South Korea
- Party: New Future Democratic
- Other political affiliations: Democratic (2015–2024); New Reform (2024)
- Spouse: Kim Suk-hee
- Children: 1
- Education: Seoul National University (LLB)

Korean name
- Hangul: 이낙연
- Hanja: 李洛淵
- RR: I Nakyeon
- MR: I Nagyŏn

Lee Nak-yon (Note: Sometimes written Lee Nak-Yeon) (Korean: 이낙연; Hanja: 李洛淵; born 20 December 1951) is a South Korean politician who served as the Prime minister of South Korea from 2017 to 2020. A member of the New Future Democratic Party, Lee previously served as the Governor of South Jeolla Province from 2014 to 2017. Before serving as governor, he worked as a journalist for over 20 years and served as a member of the National Assembly for four terms.

Lee was chosen for the position of prime minister by President Moon Jae-in to keep his campaign promise to appoint his de facto deputy from Honam region. During his tenure as prime minister, Lee became well known for his forceful exchanges with opposition party leaders and adeptness at communicating with citizens. Prior to and following his victory in the crucial Seoul Jongno district in the 2020 legislative election against conservative Hwang Kyo-ahn, another probable presidential candidate, he was once considered a likely nominee of the Democratic Party in the 2022 South Korean presidential election. He lost the primary to Lee Jae Myung in October 2021.

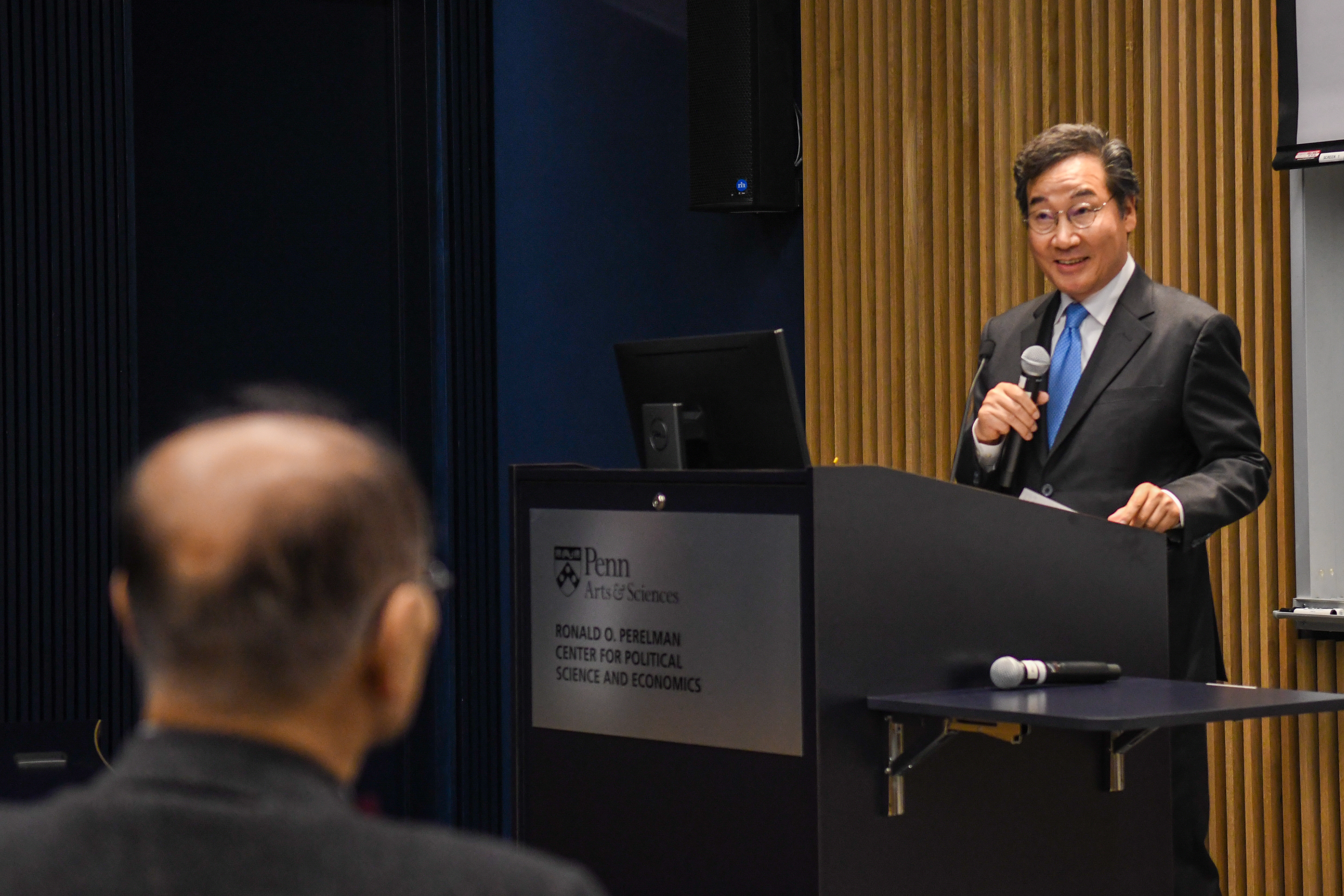
PM Lee Nak-yon speaking at the University of Pennsylvania in 2023.

== Early life and education ==
Lee was born on 20 December 1951 in Yeonggwang County in South Jeolla Province. He is the 22nd generation descendant of Grand Prince Wanpung, the 1st son of Yi Jachun as well the older brother of Taejo who is known to be the first King of Joseon. After graduating from Seoul National University with a degree in law, he shortly worked at investment trust. From the late 1970s to 2000, he worked as a journalist for the daily Dong-a Ilbo newspaper for 21 years. From 1989 to 1993, he was stationed in Tokyo as its correspondent during which he reported the inauguration of new Japanese monarch Akihito.

== Early political career ==
Lee entered politics in 2000 "based on his ties with former president Kim Dae-jung he formed while covering politics." Following his departure from the Dong-a Ilbo he was elected as a member of the National Assembly in 2000 and served for four terms. He also served as a spokesperson for former president Roh Moo-hyun when Roh was the president-elect in 2002. Roh chose Lee's draft speech for his presidential inauguration among multiple drafts and delivered the speech without changing a word Lee wrote. Lee was only one of two parliamentarians who voted against the impeachment of President Roh despite the different party membership. Lee is seen as having close ties with key Japanese politicians, having served many years as a senior member in the Korea-Japan Parliamentarians' Union. Lee speaks fluent Japanese.

He left office in the middle of his fourth term in 2014 to successfully run for governor of South Jeolla Province. Lee received around 60% approval rating throughout his term before leaving the office in May 2017. In addition to securing unprecedented amount of investment to the least developed region in the country, Lee is well known for introducing "100 won taxi" policy which improved mobility of its citizens by funding taxis to drive its citizens to the nearest bus stop for 100 won which is less than a dime. He is also known for his love of Makgeolli, a Korean traditional rice wine, which he used to facilitate communication with his provincial government employees who nicknamed him "Manager Lee" for his attention to detail.

== Prime minister ==
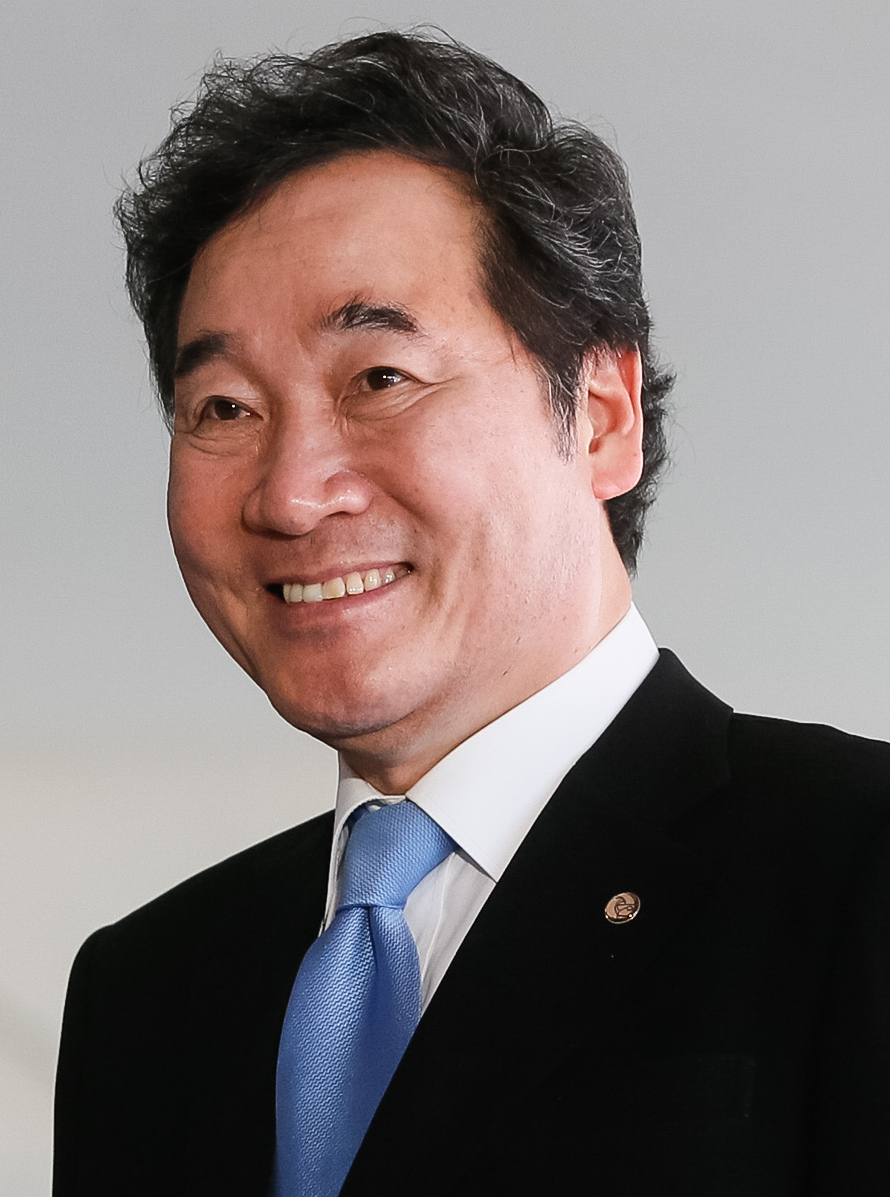
- Premiership of Lee Nak-yon; May 31, 2017 – January 14, 2020
- President: Moon Jae-in
- Cabinet: Full list
- Party: Democratic
- Seat: Sejong City

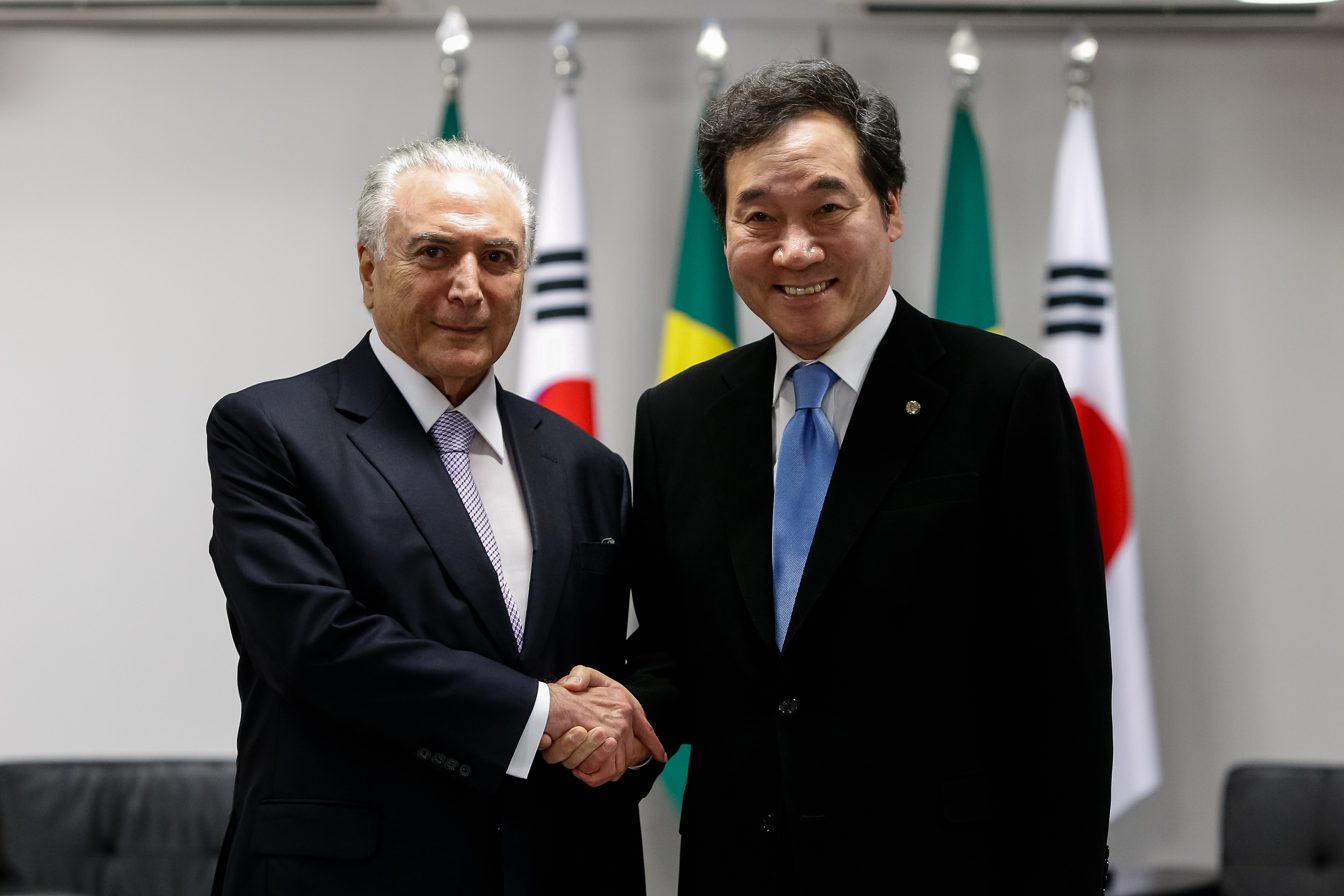
PM Lee Nak-yon meets with Brazilian president Michel Temer in Brasília, 19 March 2018

On his first day in office, President Moon nominated Lee as his first prime minister of South Korea right after his inaugural ceremony. Lee resigned from South Jeolla Provincial Governorship on the same day. Until Lee's nomination was confirmed by the parliament, Hwang Kyo-ahn, the last prime minister under impeached-and-removed president Park Geun-hye, kept his place. Lee referenced Makgeolli when emphasising his intention to work with opposition parties and for the people.

On 25 June, Lee urged North Korea to release their prisoners. On 27 July, he criticized the accord regarding 'comfort women'. On 16 August, Lee reacted negatively to calls for South Korea to possess nuclear weapons, saying the move would undermine Seoul's calls for North Korea to denuclearize, trigger a nuclear arms race and put the country under international sanctions. Reflecting such calls, the main opposition Liberty Korea Party adopted a demand for the redeployment of US tactical nuclear arms as its official party line during a general meeting of its lawmakers. On 29 November, Lee raised concerns that cryptocurrencies were corrupting the youth of South Korea, remarking "There are cases in which young Koreans including students are jumping in to make quick money and virtual currencies are used in illegal activities like drug dealing or multi-level marketing for frauds".

When he left office, Lee was the longest-serving prime minister since the Constitution of South Korea was last revised in 1987.

== Leader of the Democratic Party ==
=== 2020 South Korean legislative election ===
In 2020 election, Lee stood for Jongno constituency and defeated the UFP President Hwang Kyo-ahn. He took two roles in his party - co-chair of 2020 general election campaign with the other co-chair being then-party leader Lee Hae-chan and the chair of the committee "to overcome the national crisis" caused by the COVID-19 pandemic. With the party leader Lee Hae-chan hospitalised, Lee traveled across the nation to support his party candidates and was regarded as the de facto commander of his party's campaign in the election. The party increased its share at the parliament to a level that it does not require other parties' votes for enacting the laws.

=== 2020 Democratic Party of Korea leadership election ===
In July 2020 Lee announced his campaign for the leader of his party, Democratic Party, highlighting his experiences dealing with "crises" that are much needed in transitioning into post-COVID-19 era. If elected, Lee is likely to serve as party leader for 7 months - less than a half of its fixed tenure - following the party rule that mandates party's presidential candidate to resign from party leadership. In this regard, Lee stressed his passion for his calling to be the party leader that he will work like a "flame" during these period. In August 2020 he was elected as the party leader earning more than half of votes in every category - party delegates, its members, non-voting members and public opinion polls.

=== COVID-19 Pandemic Response ===
He relaunched the COVID-19 committee to support the government's efforts to contain the virus and prepare for "post-Covid-19 era." With President Moon praising the relationship between the government and the ruling party "fantastic," they quickly concluded long-debated issue of secondary COVID-19 relief fund that it should be given to those who are more severely impacted by the pandemic not to all people, which was strongly argued by Gyeonggi Provincial Governor Lee Jae-myung, another presidential contender of his party. The "Covid-19 committee" was merged with "K New Deal committee" which was also installed to support government's efforts to revitalise the economy and boost its transition into digital and green society.

=== Reforming the Party ===
==== Supreme Council and Cabinet ====
He appointed senior posts of his party including two remaining members of its Supreme Council he can appoint. Designation of 24-years-old Park Seong-min as one of Supreme Council members surprised many. He also created four spokesperson posts for specific issues - youth, security, economy and international affairs.

==== Ethics and Reforming the Party ====
On 16 September he launched the independent investigative body of the party (Korean: 윤리감찰단) to produce reports on alleged misconduct of its members to its ethics committee for disciplinary actions as promised during leadership campaign and appointed former judge Choi Ki-sang, assembly member from Geumcheon District, as its chair. The first members to be investigated are Lee Sang-jik and Kim Hong-gul. Lee is accused of several allegations linked to Eastar Jet he founded and Kim his real estate in Seoul. Yoon Mee-hyang who was recruited by the party for her advocacy work for "comfort women" and now accused of using donations for her own gain will not be investigated as she is already indicted by the state prosecutor and suspended of party membership and titles. On 18 September Lee tabled a motion to expel Kim who is a son of Kim Dae-jung, the first president the party has ever produced, and was recruited for his work on inter-Korean relations in civil societies for refusing to cooperate with the investigative body to the Supreme Council and it was adopted.

In October 2020, Lee brought up the idea of "committee to reform the party" (Korean: 혁신위) which resembles one led by Kim Sang-gon in 2015 under then-party leader Moon Jae-in. If installed, it is likely to be tasked with introducing measures to reform the nomination process, strengthen its ethics code and prepare the longevity of the party. On 14 October, the party's Supreme Council passed the motion to establish such committee and appoint Kim Jong-min as its chairperson.

==== Task forces ====
In September 2020, as part of Lee's party leader campaign promise to transform the party vigilant to societal issues and prepare the country's future, Lee launched seven task forces dedicated to specific issues from power institution and political reforms to youth affairs and industrial safety and appointed Supreme Council members apart from himself and floor leader as their chairpersons by their expertise. He also launched one for social tragedy countermeasures led by an assembly member from Ansan, Jeon Hae-cheol, who previously chaired party's Sewol disaster committee.

In October the party founded "Korean Peninsula Task force" (한반도TF) to support ongoing momentum in Korean peninsula towards peace irrespective of leadership changes in Japan and United States and appointed senior assembly members with expertise in foreign and inter-Korean relations as its members and Song Young-gil, the chair of the Assembly's Foreign and Unification Committee, its chair.

=== 2021 South Korean by-elections ===
Lee led the party's campaign in local by-elections in April 2021 - most prominently in two of the country's populous cities of Seoul and Busan - as a co-standing head of the campaign with the other being the party's floor leader Kim Tae-nyeon. He also led the party's temporary special committee for a new airport on Busan's Gadeokdo Island ensuring its construction and operation by the Expo 2030 in Busan upon newly passed special law on this new airport and as part of development strategy of the country's southeastern region. The Democratic Party ultimately suffered massive losses in the election, which led to criticism and calls for him not to run in the presidential election by members of his party.

=== Legislative achievements ===
During his time as party leader, the National Assembly passed the budget for year 2021 within the constitutionally mandated deadline - the first time to do so in six years. During his "flame"-like 6 months, the Democratic Party passed a total of 422 laws with or without the support from the opposition parties which include key reforms bill such as revising the laws for Corruption Investigation Office for High-ranking Officials and National Intelligence Service. Lee described these achievements as the biggest reforms taken into effect since 1987, the year of June Struggle and the latest Constitution revision as such reforms were often blocked by opposition parties in the parliament.

== Presidential campaigns ==
=== 2022 presidential election ===
On 9 March 2021, exactly a year before the 2022 South Korean presidential election, Lee resigned as the leader of his party, triggering a leadership by-election and effectively announcing his candidacy for president. He continued to lead his party's campaign for the 2021 South Korean by-elections. After the party suffered massive defeats, all remaining members of the party leadership resigned, and Lee announced he would have some time for self-reflection. After new leadership members were elected in May 2021, he met with representatives of SMEs and large corporations urging them to take part in solving youth unemployment and breaking his silence. Lee was initially described as the establishment favorite for his party's nomination.

On 10 October 2021, Lee lost the primary to Lee Jae Myung, finishing in second place with 39.14% of the vote. Following the announcement of the results, Lee Nak-yeon's campaign stated they would appeal them, arguing that the votes of Chung Sye-kyun and Kim Doo-kwan should have been included in the final result, in which case Lee Jae-myung's vote share would have been reduced to 48.38%, setting off a runoff. However, party chairman Song Young-gil rejected the appeal, stating that the specific clause of excluding votes received by withdrawn candidates was approved during the 2020 Democratic Party of Korea leadership election. On 13 October, Lee formally conceded and pledged to help the party win in the March election.

=== 2025 presidential election ===
On 30 April, New Future Democratic Party leader Jeon Byung-hun announced the conversion of the party into a "presidential election campaign committee system", effectively making Lee's presidential campaign official. However, on 10 May, Lee decided against a run, and did not endorse a candidate. On 27 May, Lee announced that he endorses Kim Moon-soo.

== Personal life ==
Lee is married with a son. Lee Nak-yon's bongwan is the Jeonju Yi clan. He is also the 22nd-generation descendant of Grand Prince Wanpung who was the elder half-brother of King Taejo of Joseon, the founder of Joseon Kingdom. He is a member of the South Korean Presbyterian Church.

== Electoral history ==
Year	Election	Post	Party affiliation	Votes	Percentage of votes	Results
2000	16th General Election	Member of National Assembly from Hampyeong and Yeonggwang Counties (South Jeolla)	Millennium Democratic Party	37,863	60.20%	Won
2004	17th General Election	Member of National Assembly from Hampyeong and Yeonggwang Counties (South Jeolla)	Millennium Democratic Party	30,123	55.28%	Won
2008	18th General Election	Member of National Assembly from Hampyeong, Yeonggwang and Jangseong Counties (South Jeolla)	United Democratic Party	42,950	67.93%	Won
2012	19th General Election	Member of National Assembly from Damyang, Hampyeong, Yeonggwang and Jangseong Counties (South Jeolla)	Democratic United Party	63,887	77.32%	Won
2014	6th Local Election	South Jeolla (Governoral Elections)	New Politics Alliance for Democracy (NPAD)	755,036	77.96%	Won
2020	21st General Election	Member of National Assembly from Jongno (Seoul)	Democratic Party	54,902	58.38%	Won
2024	22nd General Election	Member of National Assembly from Gwangsan B (Gwangju)	New Future Party	17,237	13.84%	Lost (2nd)

== Notes ==
National Assembly of the Republic of Korea
Preceded by Kim In-gon	Member of the National Assembly from Hampyeong–Yeonggwang (South Jeolla); 30 May 2000–29 May 2008	Succeeded by Himself (Hampyeong–Yeonggwang–Jangseong, South Jeolla)
Preceded by Kim Hyo-seuk (Damyang–Gokseong–Jangseong, South Jeolla); Himself (Hampyeong–Yeonggwang, South Jeolla)	Member of the National Assembly from Hampyeong–Yeonggwang–Jangseong (South Jeolla); 30 May 2008–29 May 2012	Succeeded by Himself (Damyang–Hampyeong–Yeonggwang–Jangseong, South Jeolla)
Preceded by Kim Hyo-seuk (Damyang–Gokseong–Gurye, South Jeolla); Himself (Hampyeong–Yeonggwang–Jangseong, South Jeolla)	Member of the National Assembly from Damyang–Hampyeong–Yeonggwang–Jangseong (South Jeolla); 30 May 2012–15 May 2014	Succeeded by Lee Gae-ho
Preceded by Chung Sye-kyun	Member of the National Assembly from Jongno (Seoul); 30 May 2020–15 September 2021	Succeeded by Choi Jae-hyung
Political offices
Preceded by Park Jun-young	Governor of South Jeolla Province; 1 July 2014–12 May 2017	Succeeded by Kim Gap-seop (Acting); Lee Jae-young (Acting); Kim Yung-rok
Preceded by Hwang Kyo-ahn; Yoo Il-ho (Acting)	Prime Minister of South Korea; 31 May 2017–14 January 2020	Succeeded by Chung Sye-kyun
Party political offices
Preceded by Ryu Yong-tae	Floor Leader of the Millennium Democratic Party, Democratic Party; 19 April 2004–29 June 2006	Succeeded by Kim Hyo-seuk
Preceded by Lee Hae-chan	Leader of the Democratic Party; 29 August 2020–9 March 2021	Succeeded by Kim Tae-nyeon (Acting); Do Jong-hwan (Interim); Yun Ho-jung (Interim); Song Young-gil
Preceded by New Office	Co-Leader of the New Future; 4 February 2024–17 April 2024	Succeeded by Lee Seok-hyun (Interim); Jun Byung-hun
