= Governor of South Jeolla Province =

- 전라남도지사
- Seal of South Jeolla
- Term length: Four years
- Inaugural holder: Choi Young-wook
- Formation: 15 February 1946
- Final holder: Kim Yung-rok
- Abolished: 30 June 2026
- Succession: Mayor of Jeonnam-Gwangju

The Governor of South Jeolla Province (Korean: 전라남도지사; Hanja: 全羅南道知事) was the head of the local government of South Jeolla Province who was elected to a four-year term. The office was abolished on 30 June 2026, following the merger of the province with Gwangju. The Mayor of Jeonnam-Gwangju was established as the successor, overseeing the newly created special city.

== List of governors ==
=== Appointed governors (before 1995) ===
From 1946 to 1995, the Governor of South Jeolla Province was appointed by the President of the Republic of Korea.

=== Directly elected governors (1995–present) ===
From 1995 to 2026, under provisions of the revised Local Government Act, the Governor of South Jeolla Province was elected by direct election.

Political parties
Liberal
Independent
Status
Denotes acting governor

Term	Portrait	Name (Birth–Death)	Term of office			Political party	Elected
Term	Portrait	Name (Birth–Death)	Took office	Left office	Time in office	Political party	Elected
1st		Heo Kyeong-man 허경만 許京萬 (born 1938)	1 July 1995	30 June 2002	7 years, 0 days	Democratic → National Congress → Millennium Democratic	1995
2nd		Heo Kyeong-man 허경만 許京萬 (born 1938)	1 July 1995	30 June 2002	7 years, 0 days	Democratic → National Congress → Millennium Democratic	1998
3rd		Park Tae-young 박태영 朴泰榮 (1941–2004)	1 July 2002	29 April 2004	1 year, 304 days	Millennium Democratic	2002
3rd		Song Kwang-woon 송광운 宋光運 (born 1953); Acting	30 April 2004	5 June 2004	37 days	Independent	—
3rd		Park Jun-young 박준영 朴晙瑩 (born 1946)	6 June 2004	30 June 2014	8 years, 25 days	Millennium Democratic → Democratic ('00) → Democratic ('08) → Democratic United → Democratic ('11) → NPAD	2004 (by-el.)
4th		Park Jun-young 박준영 朴晙瑩 (born 1946)	6 June 2004	30 June 2014	8 years, 25 days	Millennium Democratic → Democratic ('00) → Democratic ('08) → Democratic United → Democratic ('11) → NPAD	2006
5th		Park Jun-young 박준영 朴晙瑩 (born 1946)	6 June 2004	30 June 2014	8 years, 25 days	Millennium Democratic → Democratic ('00) → Democratic ('08) → Democratic United → Democratic ('11) → NPAD	2010
6th		Lee Nak-yon 이낙연 李洛淵 (born 1951)	1 July 2014	12 May 2017	2 years, 316 days	NPAD → Democratic	2014
6th		Kim Gap-seop 김갑섭 金甲燮 (born 1958); Acting	13 May 2017	11 September 2017	122 days	Independent	—
6th		Lee Jae-young 이재영 李在榮 (born 1966); Acting	12 September 2017	30 June 2018	292 days	Independent	—
7th		Kim Yung-rok 김영록 金瑛錄 (born 1956)	1 July 2018	30 June 2026	8 years, 0 days	Democratic	2018
8th		Kim Yung-rok 김영록 金瑛錄 (born 1956)	1 July 2018	30 June 2026	8 years, 0 days	Democratic	2022

== Elections ==
=== 1995 ===
1995 South Jeolla gubernatorial election
Party	#	Candidate	Votes	Percentage
Democratic	2	Heo Kyeong-man	769,538	73.50%
Democratic Liberal	1	Chun Suk-hong	277,386	26.49%
Total			1,046,924	100.00%
Voter turnout			76.06%	

=== 1998 ===
1998 South Jeolla gubernatorial election
Party	#	Candidate	Votes	Percentage
National Congress	2	Heo Kyeong-man	918,300	100.00%
Total			918,300	100.00%
Voter turnout			68.22%	

=== 2002 ===
2002 South Jeolla gubernatorial election
Party	#	Candidate	Votes	Percentage
Millennium Democratic	2	Park Tae-young	563,545	57.76%
Independent	3	Song Jae-gu	236,558	24.24%
Independent	4	Song Ha-sung	89,487	9.17%
Grand National	1	Hwang Soo-youn	51,504	5.27%
Independent	5	Ahn Su-won	34,439	3.53%
Total			975,533	100.00%
Voter turnout			65.63%	

=== 2004 (by-election) ===
2004 South Jeolla gubernatorial by-election
Party	#	Candidate	Votes	Percentage
Millennium Democratic	4	Park Jun-young	308,299	57.60%
Uri	1	Min Hwa-sik	187,168	35.00%
Democratic Labor	3	Kim Sun-dong	39,774	7.43%
Total			535,241	100.00%
Voter turnout			36.29%	

=== 2006 ===
2006 South Jeolla gubernatorial election
Party	#	Candidate	Votes	Percentage
Democratic	3	Park Jun-young	640,894	67.69%
Uri	1	Seo Beom-seok	181,756	19.19%
Democratic Labor	4	Park Woong-doo	68,702	7.25%
Grand National	2	Park Jae-soon	55,444	5.85%
Total			946,796	100.00%
Voter turnout			64.33%	

=== 2010 ===
2010 South Jeolla gubernatorial election
Party	#	Candidate	Votes	Percentage
Democratic	2	Park Jun-young	629,984	68.30%
Grand National	1	Kim Dae-sik	123,548	13.39%
Democratic Labor	5	Park Woong-doo	100,581	10.90%
Peace Democratic	7	Kim Kyung-jae	68,220	7.39%
Total			922,333	100.00%
Voter turnout			64.28%	

=== 2014 ===
2014 South Jeolla gubernatorial election
Party	#	Candidate	Votes	Percentage
NPAD	2	Lee Nak-yon	755,233	77.96%
Unified Progressive	3	Lee Sung-soo	120,868	12.47%
Saenuri	1	Lee Joong-hyo	92,549	9.55%
Total			968,650	100.00%
Voter turnout			65.55%	

=== 2018 ===
2018 South Jeolla gubernatorial election
Party	#	Candidate	Votes	Percentage
Democratic	1	Kim Yung-rok	807,902	77.08%
Democracy and Peace	4	Min Young-sam	110,973	10.58%
Minjung	6	Lee Sung-soo	51,410	4.90%
Bareunmirae	3	Park Mae-ho	40,287	3.84%
Justice	5	Noh Hyung-tae	37,433	3.57%
Total			1,048,005	100.00%
Voter turnout			69.24%	

=== 2022 ===
2022 South Jeolla gubernatorial election
Party	#	Candidate	Votes	Percentage
Democratic	1	Kim Yung-rok	672,433	75.74%
People Power	2	Lee Jung-hyun	167,020	18.81%
Progressive	4	Min Jeom-ki	48,336	5.44%
Total			887,789	100.00%
Voter turnout			58.44%	

== See also ==
- Government of South Korea
- Politics of South Korea
