= Park Joo-min =

South Korean politician (born 1973)

- 박주민
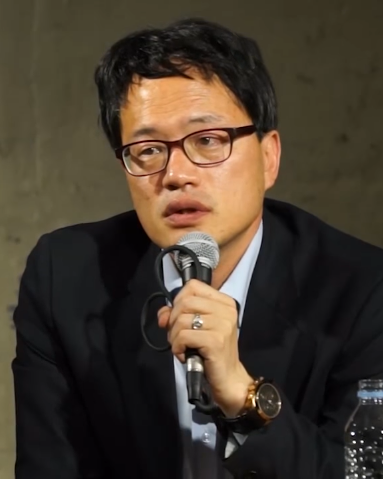

Member of the National Assembly
- Incumbent
- Assumed office 30 May 2016
- Preceded by: Lee Mi-kyung
- Constituency: Eunpyeong A (Seoul)

Personal details
- Born: 21 November 1973 (age 52) Seongbuk District, Seoul, South Korea
- Party: Democratic
- Education: Seoul National University

- Park Joo-min
- Hangul: 박주민
- Hanja: 朴柱民
- RR: Bak Jumin
- MR: Pak Chumin

Park Joo-min (Korean: 박주민; born 21 November 1973) is a South Korean politician in the liberal Democratic Party of Korea and has been a member of the National Assembly for Seoul Eunpyeong A since 2016.

== Electoral history ==
Election	Year	District	Party affiliation	Votes	Percentage of votes	Results
20th National Assembly General Election	2016	Eunpyeong A (Seoul)	Democratic Party	57,767	54.93%	Won
21st National Assembly General Election	2020	Eunpyeong A (Seoul)	Democratic Party	86,351	64.29%	Won
22nd National Assembly General Election	2024	Eunpyeong A (Seoul)	Democratic Party	89,379	60.78%	Won
