= Kim Sang-gon =

South Korean politician (born 1949)

- 김상곤

Deputy Prime Minister of South Korea
- In office 5 July 2017 – 2 October 2018 Serving with Kim Dong-yeon
- Prime Minister: Lee Nak-yeon
- Preceded by: Lee Joon-sik (interim)
- Succeeded by: Yoo Eun-hae

Minister of Education
- In office 5 July 2017 – 2 October 2018
- Prime Minister: Lee Nak-yeon
- Preceded by: Lee Joon-sik
- Succeeded by: Yoo Eun-hae

Personal details
- Born: 5 December 1949 (age 76) Gwangju, South Korea
- Party: Democratic
- Education: Seoul National University

Kim Sang-gon (Korean: 김상곤; born 5 December 1949) is a South Korean politician served as the Minister of Education of South Korea and Deputy Prime Minister of South Korea from 2017 to 2018. In June 2017, he was nominated by President Moon Jae-in and would be appointed to both positions in July.

== Biography ==
Kim graduated from Gwangju Jeil High School in 1968, and attended Seoul National University, graduating with a BA (1976), MA (1982), and Ph.D (1992) in Business administration. From 1983 to 2009, he would serve as a professor of business administration at Hanshin University. From 1999 to 200?, he would serve as President of the Korean Association of Labor Studies. In 2009, he was appointed Superintendent of Education in Gyeonggi Province, serving in the post until 2014. Kim would join the Democratic Party (then the New Politics Alliance for Democracy), and would serve as Chairman of its Innovation Council and Human Resources Recruitment Council. From April to May 2017, he would serve as Co-Chairman of the Presidential Election Council.
