= Park Seong-min =

South Korean politician (born 1996)

- 박성민
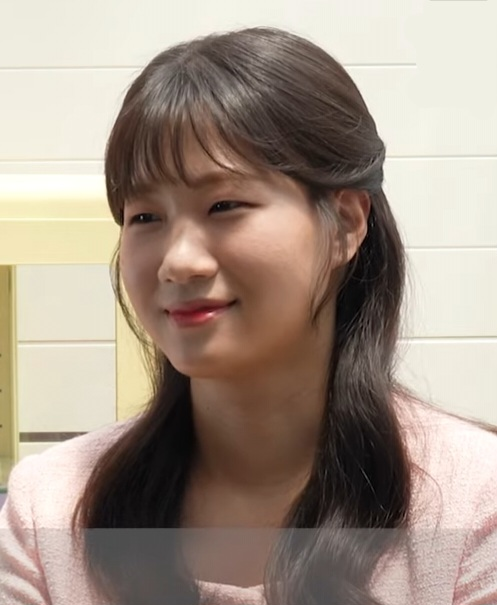

Secretary to the President for Youth affairs
- In office 21 June 2021 – 9 May 2022
- President: Moon Jae-in
- Preceded by: Kim Kwang-jin

Member of the Supreme Council of the Democratic Party
- In office 4 September 2020 – 8 April 2021
- Leader: Lee Nak-yon

Youth Spokesperson of the Democratic Party
- In office September 2019 – August 2020 Serving with Chang Jong-hwa
- Leader: Lee Hae-chan
- Succeeded by: Cho Eun-joo

Personal details
- Born: 25 August 1996 (age 30)
- Party: Democratic
- Education: Korea University

Park Seong-min (Korean: 박성민; born 25 August 1996) is a South Korean politician who served as a secretary to President Moon Jae-in for youth affairs from 2021 to 2022. At the age of 25 Park became the youngest person to assume secretary roles in Office of the President Moon. She was previously the youngest person to form the Supreme Council of the ruling party under Lee Nak-yon leadership who served as Moon's first prime minister.

Park was previously one of two youth spokespeople of her party appointed by then-party leader Lee Hae-chan through first-ever open competition for this post. She also served as a member of University Students Committee of her party in 2018 and co-chair of youth policy committee of Yongin in 2019.

Park is currently a Korea University undergraduate student with Korean language and literature major.

If confirmed, she will be the youngest member of the Supreme Council, her party's highest decision-making committee. Unlike other members of the Council, Park will serve as its member as long as her nominator, Lee Nak-yon, serves as the party leader. On 4 September 2020, her nomination was confirmed commencing her term as its Supreme Council member.

From September 2020 Park chairs party's task force for youth affairs. She also proposed creating "venue" for the party and youth can communicate regularly.

Following the party's defeat in 2021 by-elections, all members of Supreme Council including Park resigned. In May 2020 Park joined Lee Nak-yon's de facto presidential campaign as its spokesperson.
