= Yoo Eun-hae =

South Korean politician (born 1962)

- 유은혜
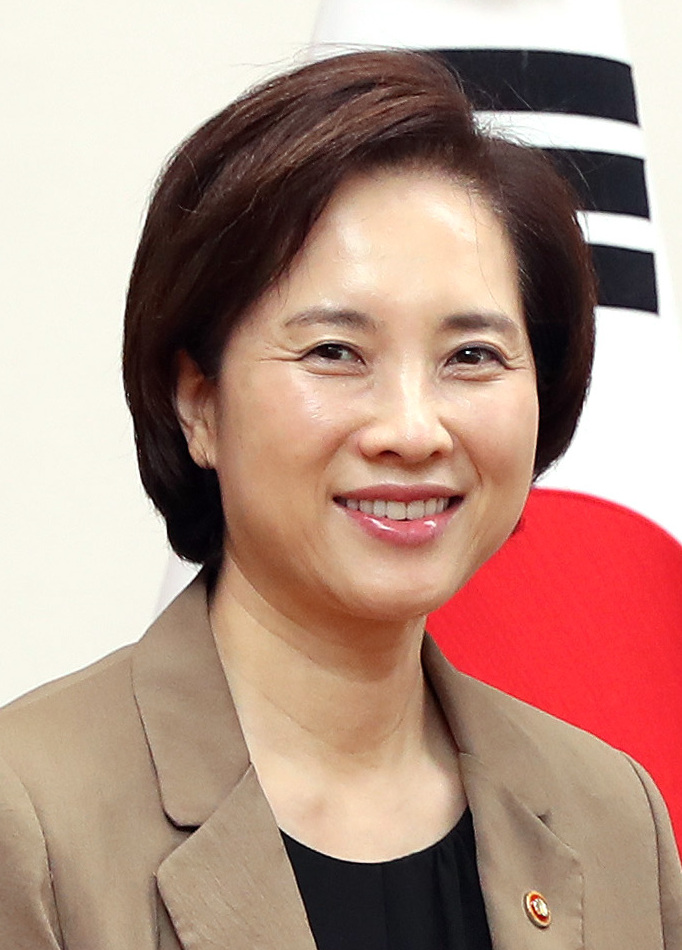

Deputy Prime Minister of South Korea
- In office 2 October 2018 – 9 May 2022 Serving with Hong Nam-ki
- President: Moon Jae-in
- Prime Minister: Lee Nak-yeon; Chung Sye-kyun; Hong Nam-ki (acting); Kim Boo-kyum
- Preceded by: Kim Sang-gon
- Succeeded by: Park Soon-ae

Minister of Education
- In office 2 October 2018 – 9 May 2022
- President: Moon Jae-in
- Prime Minister: Chung Sye-kyun
- Preceded by: Kim Sang-gon
- Succeeded by: Park Soon-ae

Member of the National Assembly
- In office 30 May 2012 – 29 May 2020
- Preceded by: Baek Sung-woon
- Succeeded by: Hong Jung-min
- Constituency: Goyang Ilsandong (Gyeonggi, 2012-2016); Goyang C (Gyeonggi, 2016-2020)

Personal details
- Born: 2 October 1962 (age 64) Seoul, South Korea
- Party: Democratic
- Education: Sungkyunkwan University; Ewha Womans University
- Religion: Roman Catholicism

- Yoo Eun-hae
- Hangul: 유은혜
- Hanja: 兪銀惠
- RR: Yu Eunhye
- MR: Yu Ŭnhye

Yoo Eun-hae (Korean: 유은혜; born 2 October 1962) is a South Korean politician who served as the Minister of Education and ex officio Deputy Prime Minister of South Korea, along with Hong Nam-ki under President Moon Jae-in from October 2018 to 9 May 2022. She is the first woman to serve as a Deputy Prime Minister in South Korea.

Yoo is the longest-serving education minister of the country. She was expected to resign and run for the governor of Gyeonggi Province but decided not to given the pandemic-disrupted education in the country.

While studying at Sungkyunkwan University, she joined pro-democracy movement against authoritarian regime of then-president Chun. She has bachelor's degree in Eastern Philosophy from Sungkyunkwan University and Master's degree in public policy from Ewha Woman's University.

She first met Moon when the then-lawyer helped her family to receive benefits from her father's overwork death. She was the spokesperson of Moon's second presidential campaign in 2017. From 2012 to 2020, Yoo served as the two-term, Democratic member of the National Assembly from Ilsan, Goyang.

== Electoral history ==
Election	Year	District	Party affiliation	Votes	Percentage of votes	Results
18th National Assembly General Election	2008	proportional representation (19th)	United Democratic Party	4,313,645	25.17%	Not Elected
19th National Assembly General Election	2012	Gyeonggi Goyang Ilsan dong (Gyeonggi)	Democratic United Party	60,236	51.59%	Won
20th National Assembly General Election	2016	Gyeonggi Goyang C (Gyeonggi)	Democratic Party	62,886	47.73%	Won
