= Ministry of Personnel Management =

Government ministry of South Korea

- 인사혁신처

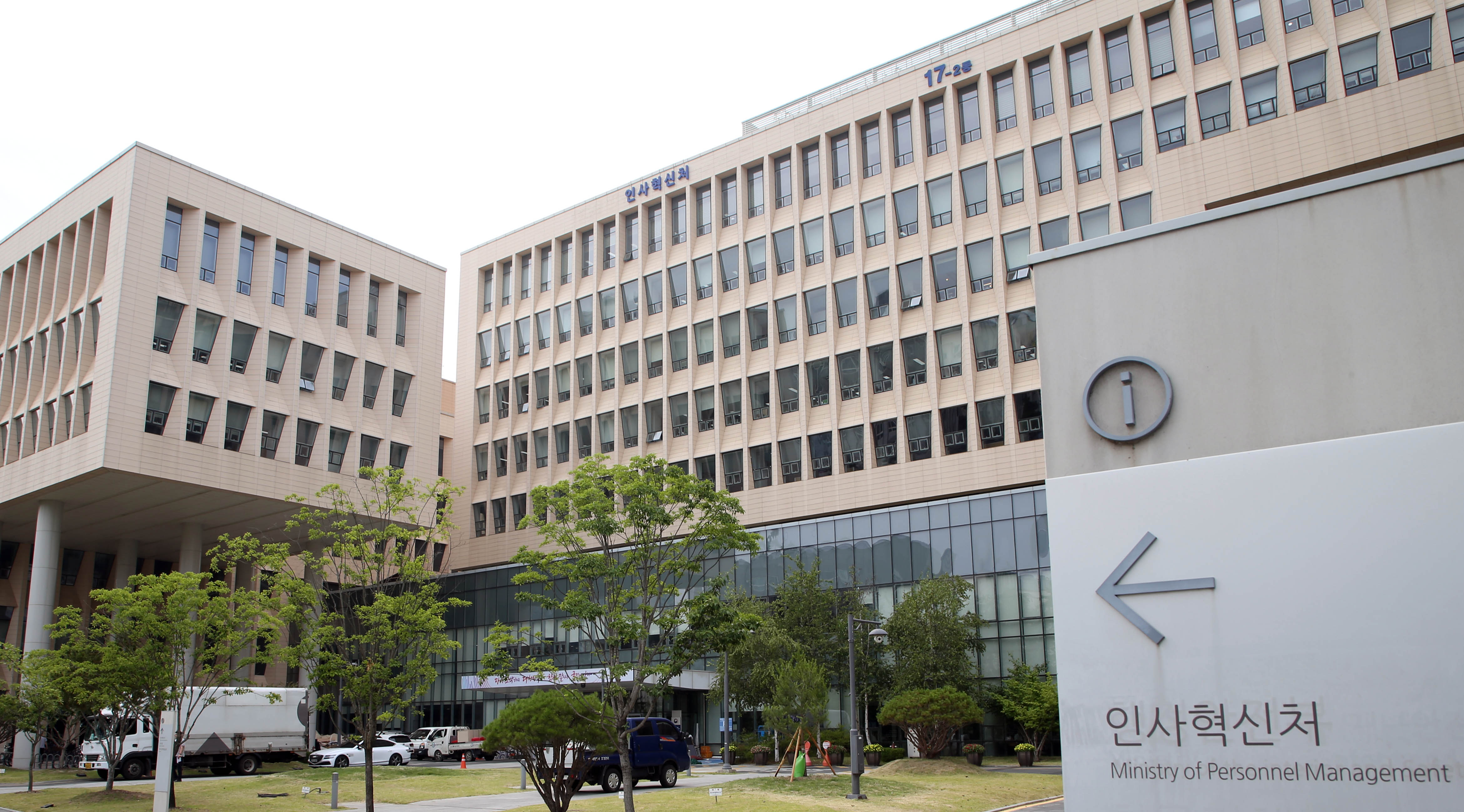
- MPM headquarters in Sejong

Agency overview
- Formed: 19 November 2014; 11 years ago
- Preceding agencies: Bureau of Personnel Management; Presidential Commission on Higher Civil Service Examination
- Jurisdiction: Government of South Korea
- Headquarters: 499, Hannuri-daero, Sejong, South Korea
- Minister responsible: Choi Dong-seok
- Deputy Minister responsible: Parc Yong-soo
- Child agencies: National Human Resources Development Institute; Appeals Commission
- Website: mpm.go.kr

Korean name
- Hangul: 인사혁신처
- Hanja: 人事革新處
- RR: Insa hyeoksincheo
- MR: Insa hyŏksinch'ŏ

The Ministry of Personnel Management (Korean: 인사혁신처) is an independent organisation under Office of Prime Minister of South Korea responsible for human resource management of the executive branch of the government. It also oversees the government employees' pension which is managed Government Employees Pension Service. It is led by the vice-ministerial-level Minister of Personal Management.

The current Ministry was formed in 2014 and moved to its current headquarters in Sejong City in 2016. Its history can be traced back to 1948 when the Bureau of Personal Management was created under now-Ministry of the Interior and Safety and Presidential Commission on Higher Civil Service Examination.

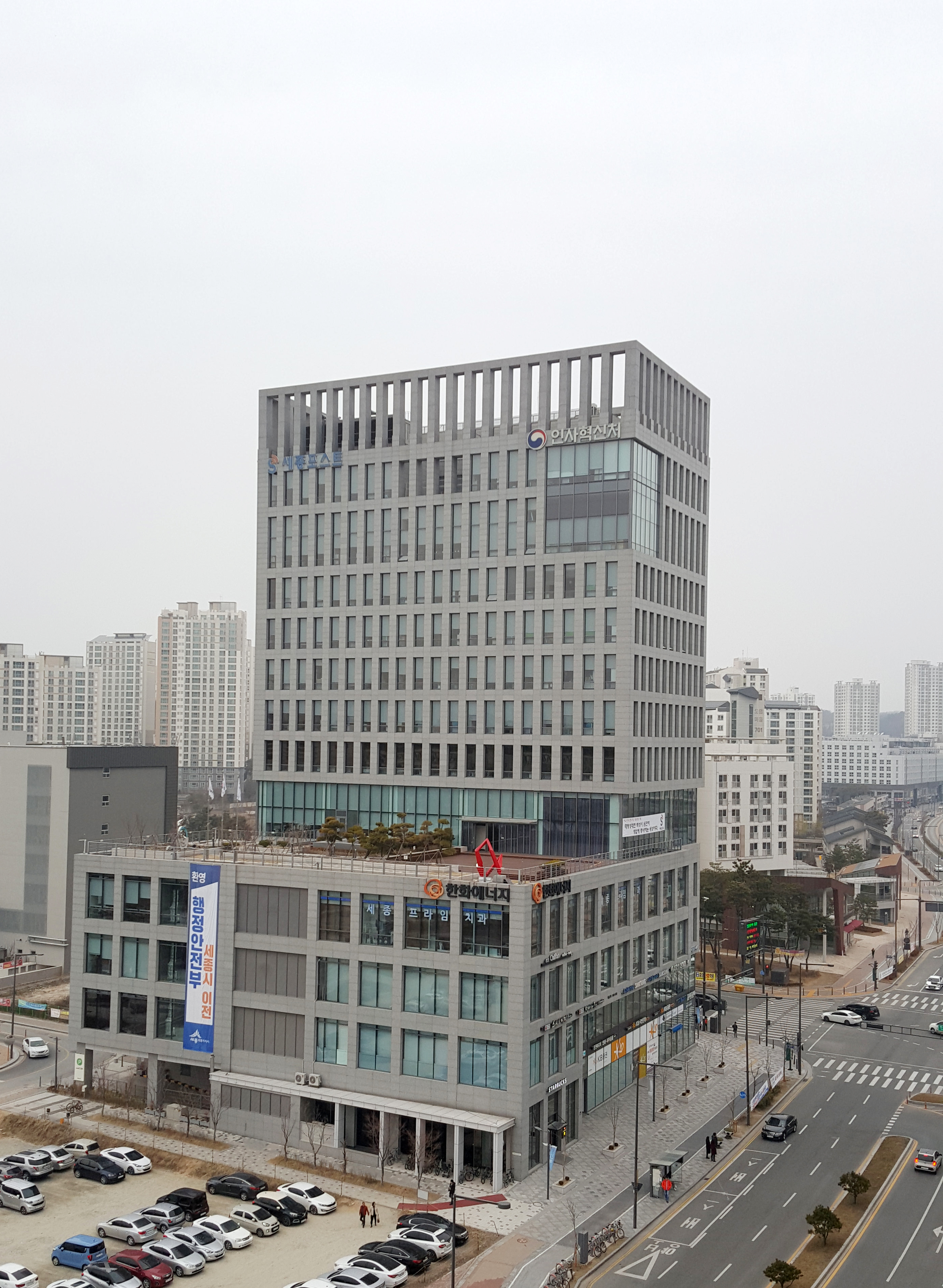
MPM building

It has two child agencies both led by vice-ministerial-level heads - National Human Resources Development Institute (NHI) and Appeals Commission.

== Logos ==
2014~2016

2016~present

== See also ==
- Ministry of Security and Public Administration
- Ministry of the Interior and Safety (South Korea)
- United States Office of Personnel Management
