= Hampyeong County =

Coordinates: 35°03′50″N 126°31′10″E

Hampyeong
- County
- Flag Emblem of Hampyeong
- Anthem: Aloha Hampyeong
- Location in South Korea
- Country: South Korea
- Region: Honam
- Provincial-level city: Jeonnam-Gwangju
- Administrative divisions: 1 eup, 8 myeon

Government
  - mayor: Sang Leek Lee (이상익)

Area
  - Total: 392.77 km^{2} (151.65 sq mi)

Population (September 2024)
  - Total: 30,107
  - Density: 76.653/km^{2} (198.53/sq mi)
  - Dialect: Jeolla
- Time zone: UTC+9 (Korea Standard Time)
- Area code: +82-61

Korean name
- Hangul: 함평군
- Hanja: 咸平郡
- RR: Hampyeong-gun
- MR: Hamp'yŏng-gun

Hampyeong County (Korean: 함평군) is a county in Jeonnam-Gwangju, South Korea.

== History ==
Hampyeong used to be called Jinguk(진국) in prehistoric times, and Mahan in the Samhan age. Mahan consisted of 54 smaller counties, and it is estimated that one or two of these counties were part of present-day Hampyeong County according to the evidence of dolmens in the area.

Hampyeong was divided into two hyeon, Gulrae-hyeon and Daji-hyeon during the reign of Baekje Kingdom (18 B.C ~ 660 A.D.). Gulrea-hyeon was called Hampyeong-hyeon during the reign of the Silla Kingdom and in the Goryeo Kingdom. Today it covers Hampyeong-eub, Sonbul-myeon, Singwang-myeon, and Dadong-myeon.

Hampyeong-gun (1899)

In the 9th year of King Taejong of the Joseon Dynasty, Hampyeong-hyeon and Mopyeong-hyeon were fused into Hampyeong-hyeon, and consisted of 14 myeon; Donghyeonrae-myeon, Suhyeonrae-myeon, Yongpung-myeon, Haejae-myeon, Dagyeong-myeon, Dadong-myeon, Sonbul-myeon, Singwang-myeon, pyeongreung-myeon, Sinji-myeon, Haebo-myeon, Wolak-myeon, Modong-myeon, Daeya-myeon.

On May 26, 1989, Hampyeong-hyeon changed its name to Hampyeong county. On November 11, 1932, Sikji-myeon and pyeongreung-myeon were annexed, and Nasan-myeon was added. On January 1, 1963, Hampyeong-myeon became Hampyeong-eub and it consisted of one eup and 8 myeons.

On July 1, 1973, Sang-ok, Wolsong, Geumgok, and Baekho were annexed into Dadong-myeon.

== Symbol ==
- County Flower : Crape myrtle
- County Tree : Ginkgo tree
- County Bird : Pigeon
- County Butterfly : Swallowtail butterfly

== Brand Slogan ==
Hampyeong has wide idea for development. Its slogan is "ECO HAMPYEONG" which represents green color of its land and creativity. Also, it tries to consider many residents are farmers doing eco-friendly work.

== Hampyeong Butterfly Festival ==
Hampyeong is famous for its annual butterfly festival which is the only one of its kind in South Korea. The county officially has upbrought tens of thousands of butterflies and other facilities like greenhouses for insects for the festival. Annually Hampyeong attracts more than 1 million people which, considering its size and scale is quite a large number.

== Twin towns – sister cities ==
Hampyeong is twinned with:

- Seongdong-gu, South Korea
- Nam-gu, South Korea
- Dong-gu, South Korea
- Namhae, South Korea
- Goseong, South Korea
- Goryeong, South Korea
- Jecheon, South Korea
- Anyang, South Korea
- Angeles City, Philippines
