= Yeonggwang County =

Coordinates: 35°16′30″N 126°30′34″E

Yeonggwang
- County
- Panoramic view of Yeonggwang-eup

- Flag Emblem of Yeonggwang

- Location in South Korea
- Country: South Korea
- Region: Honam
- Provincial-level city: Jeonnam-Gwangju
- Administrative divisions: 3 eup, 8 myeon

Area
  - Total: 472.97 km^{2} (182.61 sq mi)

Population (September 2024)
  - Total: 51,688
  - Density: 115.8/km^{2} (300/sq mi)
  - Dialect: Jeolla

Korean name
- Hangul: 영광군
- Hanja: 靈光郡
- RR: Yeonggwang-gun
- MR: Yŏnggwang-gun

Yeonggwang County (Korean: 영광군) is a county in Jeonnam-Gwangju, South Korea.

== Speciality ==
Yeonggwang is a large producer of a fish, the small yellow croaker which are sometimes given by Korean people as a gift to others. It is called Yeonggwang gulbi (meaning "dried croaker") among Koreans, and it is nicknamed "rice thief" because of its wide popularity.

The fish originated from the Goryeo Dynasty. They migrate northward from the East China Sea, where they spend the winter season, to Yeonpyeongdo Island, to spawn at the start of the thawing season. They spawn at sea in front of Chilsan, near Beopseongpo in Yeonggwang, between April 10 and 30, while moving northward.

== Nuclear power plant ==
The Hanbit Nuclear Power Plant was established in 1979 and has reached its full capacity. Now there are six plants. In 2007, plants of Yeonggwang achieved a position of third in the world, ranked by the degree of utilization.

== Sister cities ==
- Gwangjin-gu, Seoul, South Korea
