= The Institute for Democracy =

South Korean policy research institute

- 민주연구원
- Formation: 27 August 2008
- Headquarters: 8th and 10th floors, Democratic Party Headquarters, 7 Gukhoe-daero 68-gil, Yeongdeungpo-gu, Seoul
- Chairperson of the Board: Kim Min-seok
- President: Kang Deuk-koo
- Affiliations: Democratic Party of Korea
- Website: idptheminjoo.kr

The Institute for Democracy (Korean: 민주연구원) is a policy research institute affiliated with the Democratic Party of Korea. It was launched on 27 August 2008 as the Democratic Policy Institute and was renamed in 2016. Kim Min-seok is chairperson of the board, and Kang Deuk-koo has been named the incoming president of the institute.

== Organisational structure ==
- Board of directors
- Chairperson
- President
  - Honorary Presidents (former presidents)
  - Diplomacy and Security Team (International Cooperation)
- Vice President
  - Operations and Planning Division
  - Strategic Research Division
  - Policy Research Division
  - Policy Network Division

== Executives ==
- Chairperson of the Board: Kim Min-seok
- President: Lee Jae-young
- Board Members: Han Jeoung-ae, Kwon Chil-seung, Kim Yoon, Kim Kyung-pyo, Kim Do-kyun, Park Young-hoon, Yeom Jong-hyun, Lee Jun-hyung, Lee Heung-seok, Jeong Seok-won, Hwang Young-min
- Auditor: Yoo Dong-soo
- Vice Presidents: Yang Ki-dae, Jeon Jun-kyung, Song Gap-seok, Lee Su-jin, Cheon Jun-ho, Jang Cheol-min, Jeon Hee-rak, Kang Hwa-su, Choi Byeong-cheon, Song Du-han

== Chairpersons ==
No.	Name	Term	Notes
1	Chung Sye-kyun	27 August 2008 – 20 August 2010	
2	Park Jie-won	20 August 2010 – 20 October 2010	
3	Sohn Hak-kyu	20 October 2010 – 1 December 2011	
4	Han Myeong-sook	1 January 2012 – 1 April 2012	
5	Lee Hae-chan	9 June 2012 – 4 May 2013	
6	Kim Han-gil	4 May 2013 – 4 August 2014	Co-chairperson
6	Ahn Cheol-soo	26 March 2014 – 4 August 2014	Co-chairperson
7	Park Young-sun	4 August 2014 – 17 September 2014	
8	Moon Hee-sang	17 September 2014 – 8 February 2015	
9	Moon Jae-in	8 February 2015 – 27 January 2016	
10	Kim Chong-in	27 January 2016 – 27 August 2016	
11	Choo Mi-ae	27 August 2016 – 25 August 2018	
12	Lee Hae-chan	25 August 2018 – 29 January 2020	
13	Lee Nak-yon	29 January 2020 – 9 March 2021	
14	Kim Tae-nyeon	9 March 2021 – 8 April 2021	
15	Do Jong-hwan	8 April 2021 – 16 April 2021	
16	Hong Young-pyo	16 April 2021 – 2 May 2021	
17	Song Young-gil	2 May 2021 – 10 March 2022	
18	Yoon Ho-jung	10 March 2022 – 2 June 2022	Co-chairperson
18	Park Ji-hyun	10 March 2022 – 2 June 2022	Co-chairperson
19	Park Hong-keun	2 June 2022 – 10 June 2022	
20	Woo Sang-ho	10 June 2022 – 28 August 2022	
21	Lee Jae-myung	28 August 2022 – 24 June 2024	
22	Park Chan-dae	24 June 2024 – 18 August 2024	
23	Lee Jae-myung	18 August 2024 – 9 April 2025	
24	Park Chan-dae	9 April 2025 – 13 June 2025	
25	Kim Byung-kee	13 June 2025 – 2 August 2025	
26	Jung Chung-rae	2 August 2025 – 24 June 2026	
27	Han Byung-do	24 June 2026 – 17 August 2026	
28	Kim Min-seok	17 August 2026 – present	

== Presidents ==
No.	Name	Term	Notes
1	Kim Hyo-seok	27 August 2008 – 24 January 2011	
2	Park Soon-sung	24 January 2011 – 21 June 2012	Professor at Dongguk University
3	Byun Jae-il	21 June 2012 – 12 August 2014	
4	Min Byung-doo	12 August 2014 – 6 September 2016	
5	Kim Yong-ik	6 September 2016 – November 2016	
6	Kim Min-seok	15 May 2017 – 28 April 2019	
7	Yang Jung-chul	29 April 2019 – 17 April 2020	
Acting	Baek Won-woo	18 April 2020 – 6 September 2020	
8	Hong Ihk-pyo	7 September 2020 – 17 June 2021	
9	Noh Woong-rae	18 June 2021 – 11 November 2022	
10	Jung Tae-ho	26 December 2022 – 21 April 2024	
11	Lee Han-joo	22 April 2024 – 7 November 2025	Professor at Gachon University
12	Lee Jae-young	8 December 2025 – 14 September 2026	

== See also ==
- Democratic Party (South Korea, 2008)
- Democratic Party (South Korea, 2013)
- Democratic Party (South Korea, 2015)
