= Boseong County =

Coordinates: 34°46′N 127°05′E

Boseong
- County
- Panoramic view of Boseong-eup

- Flag Emblem of Boseong

- Location in South Korea
- Country: South Korea
- Region: Honam
- Administrative divisions: 2 eup, 10 myeon

Area
  - Total: 663.16 km^{2} (256.05 sq mi)

Population (September 2024)
  - Total: 37,164
  - Density: 92/km^{2} (240/sq mi)
  - Dialect: Jeolla

Korean name
- Hangul: 보성군
- Hanja: 寶城郡
- RR: Boseong-gun
- MR: Posŏng-gun

Boseong County (Korean: 보성군) is a county in Jeonnam-Gwangju, South Korea. Boseong is famous for its green tea leaves, with 26.71 hectares of land dedicated to its production.

== History ==
In the Samhan era, Boseong belonged to the Mahan confederacy and later became Bokhol County (伏忽郡) under the rule of the Baekje dynasty. The name "Boseong" was given in Unified Silla.

== Geography ==
Large areas consist of mountains such as Mangil-Bong, Jonje Mountain and Joowol Mountain. The Boseong River flows through the center of Boseong. The multipurpose Juam Dam was built on the Boseong River in 1990.

=== Climate ===
Boseong is one of the rainiest places in South Korea. It has a moderate climate. The average annual temperature is 12.6 °C. The average temperature in January is −0.5 °C and the average temperature in August is 27.8 °C. Annual mean precipitation is 1,450 mm.

== Administrative district ==
Boseong consists of two towns-Boseong town and Beolgyo town. In both towns, the population has gradually decreased.

- The town of Boseong is the seat of a county office. It is also a major transportation hub since 1930 and the distribution center of agricultural products. The largest tea gardens in South Korea are in the southern part of the Boseong County.
- Beolgyo is also major transportation hub. It had flourished since the Japanese occupation but it has somewhat declined in recent years.

== Boseong Green Tea ==
Boseong Green Tea is a special product of the Boseong district.

Boseong County, also called DongguyeojI-Seungnam (meaning "tea house" in the Joseon Dynasty), is known as the green tea capital of Korea. It has produced green tea for the past 1600 years. It is the largest tea-producing area in Korea, accounting for 40 percent of the nation's tea production. Almost one third of all tea farmland is located in Boseong, and nearly half of all green tea production in Korea comes from the area. This status has been carefully crafted in recent decades, partly due to the long history green tea has with the area.

The surrounding climate and soil provide healthy conditions for growing green tea that has a distinct taste and aroma.

The earliest historical mention of green tea in Korea was from the reign of Queen Seondeok of Silla in the mid-7th century AD. Nearly two hundred years later, historical records indicate that green tea seeds were planted at the foot of nearby Jirisan Mountain. During the Joseon dynasty, green tea began to fall out of favor due to its close association with Buddhism, but was still enjoyed by certain parts of the population; and the Jirisan plantation continued to thrive. But green tea was not produced on a large-scale basis until the 1930s. By the 1970s, huge, terraced farms as large as 250 acres became commonplace on local mountainsides. The 1980s marked the beginning of a decline in green tea demand, which resulted in lower green tea output and a degradation of crops. The local government then decided to reinvigorate the green tea industry: local green tea businesses were subsidized; newer, more efficient means to increase output and quality were developed through collaboration with local universities and research institutes. Local media outlets also made efforts to present Boseong as the green tea capital of the country, in order to increase dominance in the industry by local businesses and draw in tourists from around the country.

Mt. Hwangseong features the largest plantation in Boseong, the Daehan Green Tea Plantation. This plantation accounts for over one third of all tea production in the area. The mountainside features a terraced design that extends along the lower reaches of the mountain and is carefully manicured, providing an impressive view when seen from the top. This view is accessible by road and has become a well-known stop for tourists. The Boseong Fragrance Tea Festival is also staged in May of each year and 2013 will mark the 38th year of the festival. The festival gives tea enthusiasts the chance to pick tea leaves, make tea bowls or sample local cuisine infused with green tea flavoring.

Boseong Green Tea passed the strict quality inspection of the Russian Medical Biology Lab, and was officially recognized as a beverage suitable for an astronaut's special diet.

== Transportation ==
National Road No. 2 goes through Boseong, and the Gyeongjeon Line transits several towns. There are mainly five stations including Boseong station, Dukryang Station, Yedang Station, Joseong Station and Beolgyo Station. Coastal region has well-connected transportation. However, inland of Boseong has a poor transportation because of mountains.

== Notable people ==
- Philip Jaisohn (Seo Jae-pil) (1864–1951), a Korean independence activist
- Paik Hak-soon, a writer on inter-Korean relations and analyst of North Korea
- Park Ra-yeon (b. 1951), a South Korean poet
- Cheong Yang-seog (b. 1958), a South Korean politician in the People Power Party
- Baek Ji-heon, a K-pop singer from the group Fromis 9

== Twin towns – sister cities ==
Boseong is twinned with:

- Gangnam-gu, South Korea
- Gangbuk-gu, South Korea
- Yeonje-gu, South Korea
- Buk-gu, South Korea
- Sujiatun, China

== Gallery ==
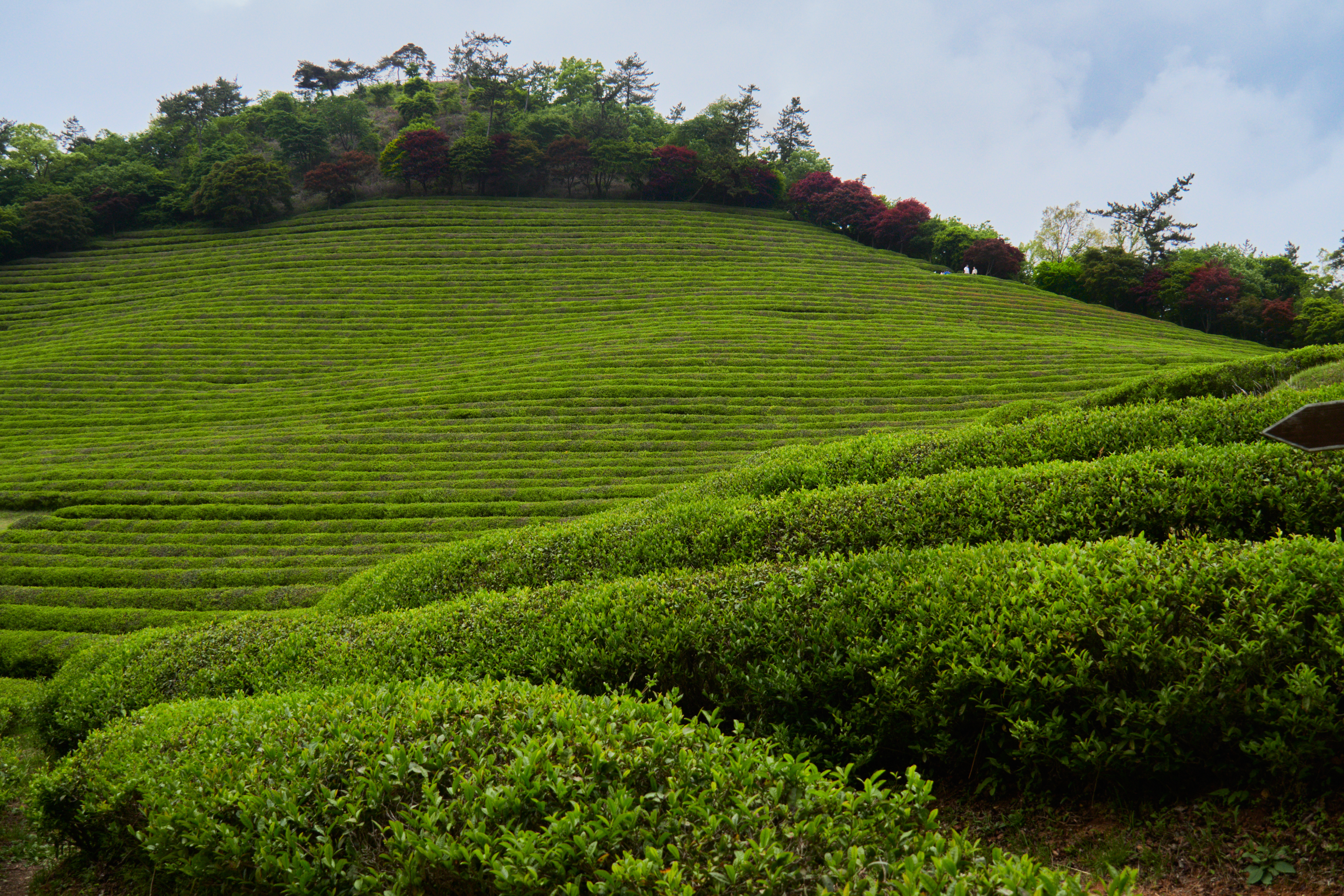
Rows of cultivated tea bushes covering a hillside at a tea plantation in Boseong.

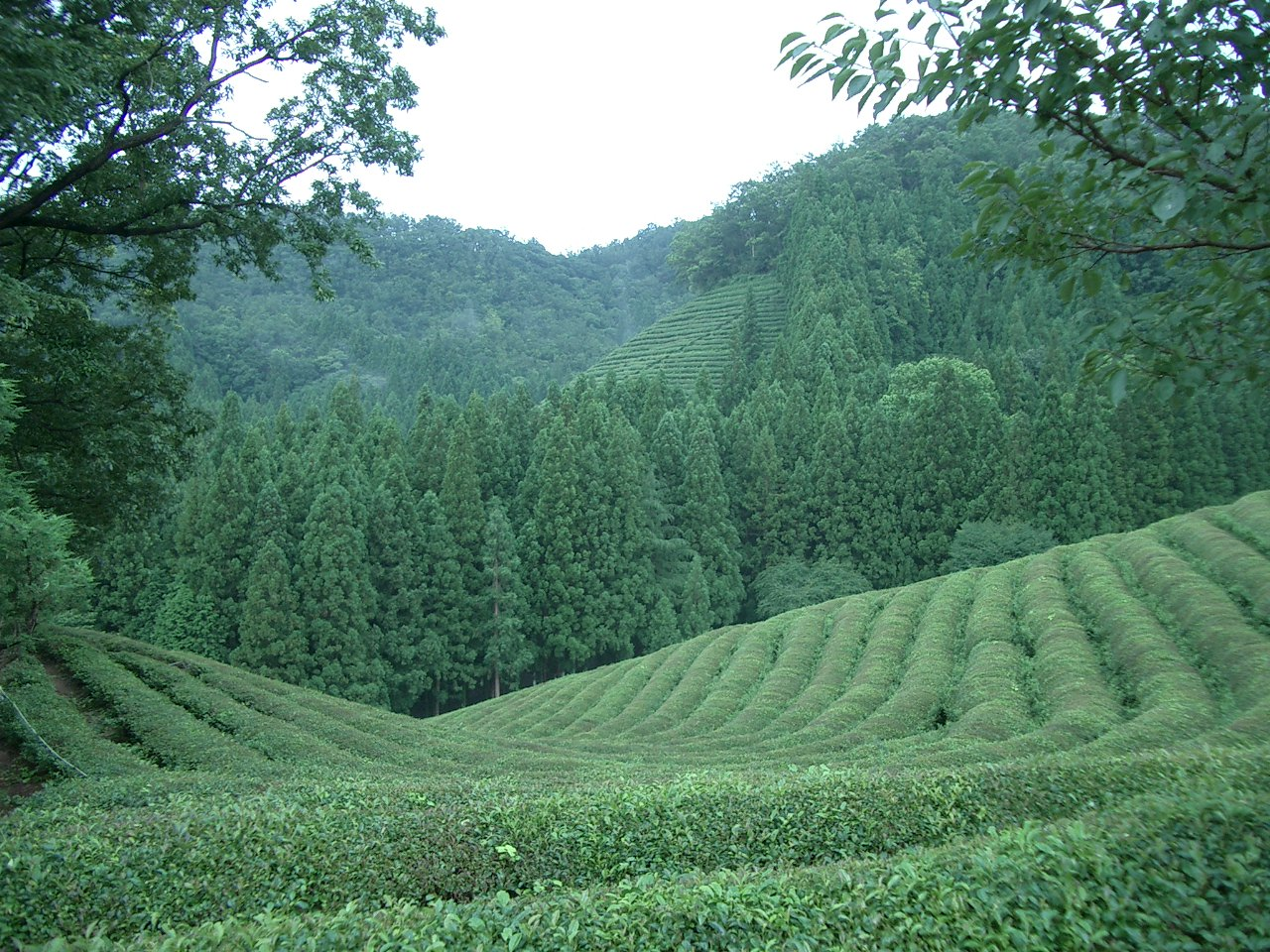
Green tea field

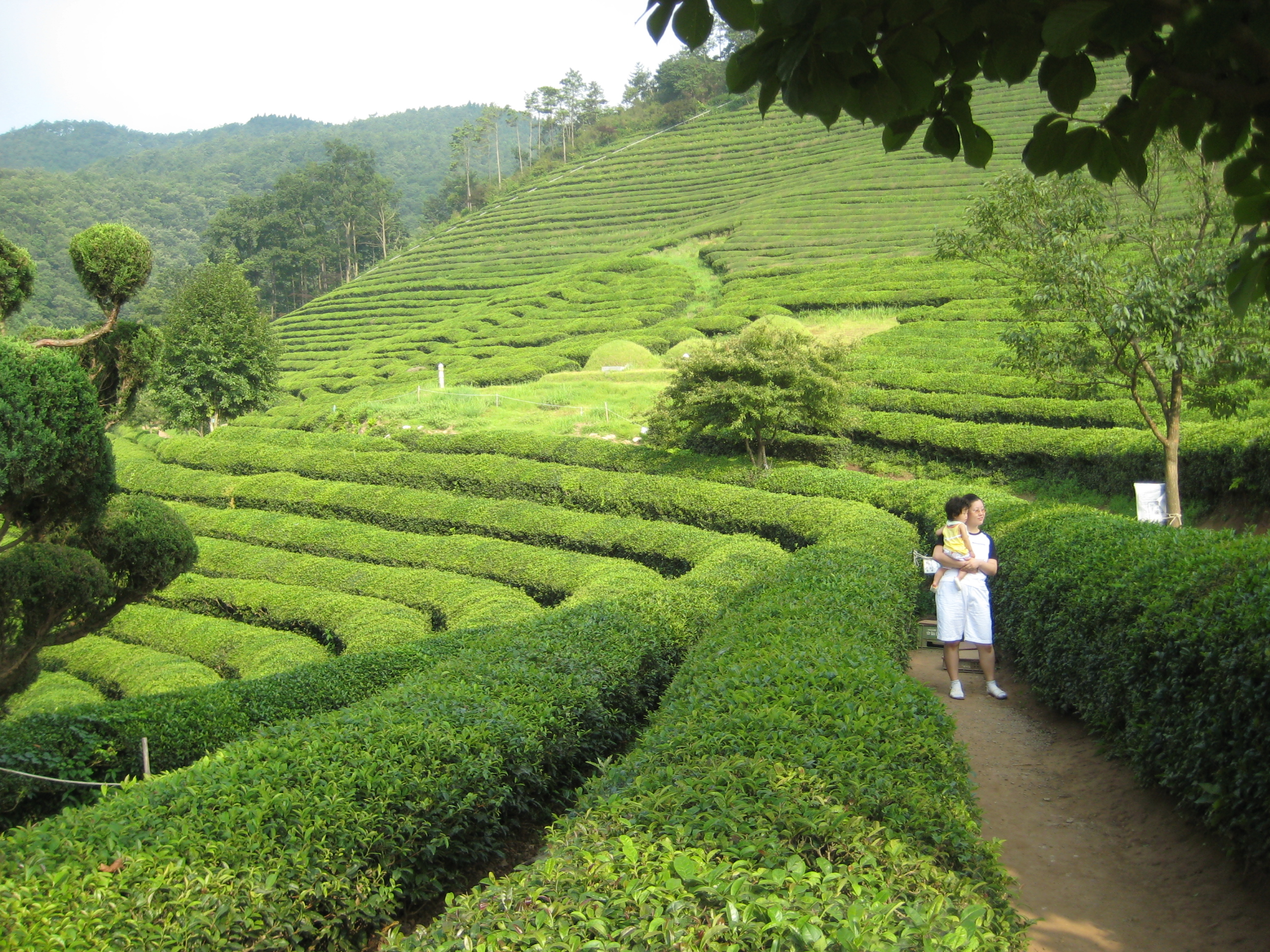
Green tea field

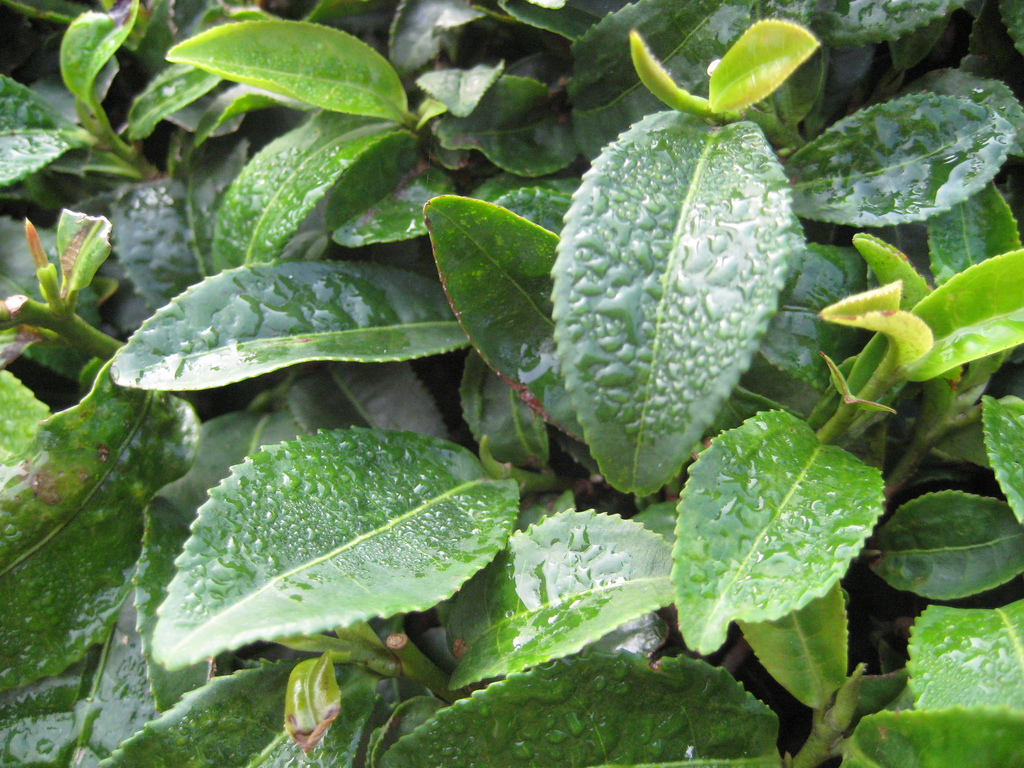
Green tea leaves

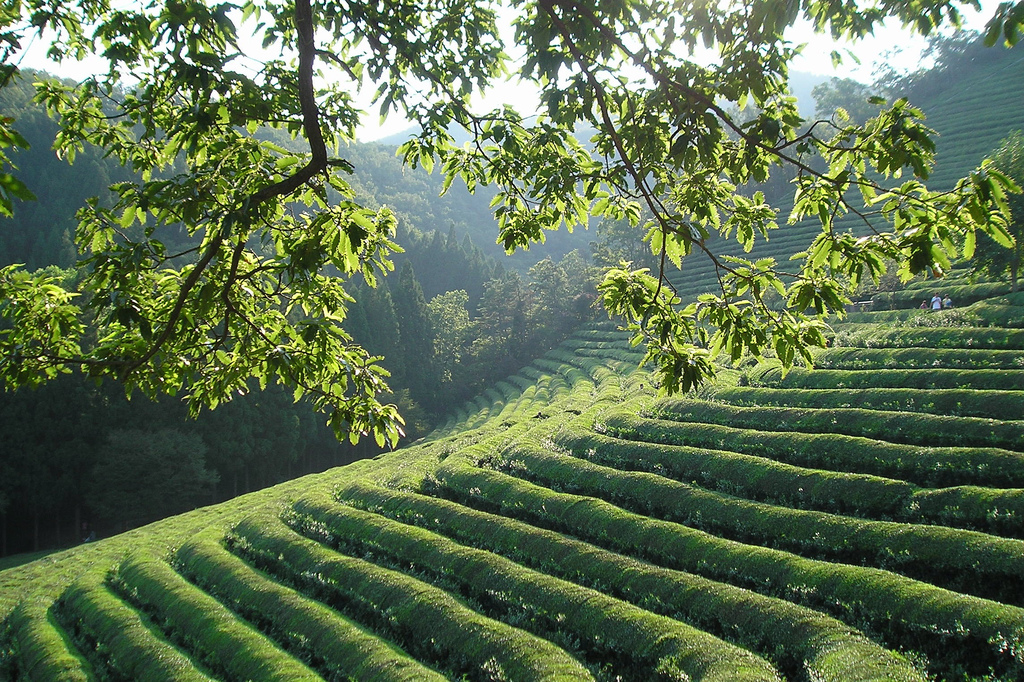
Green tea field

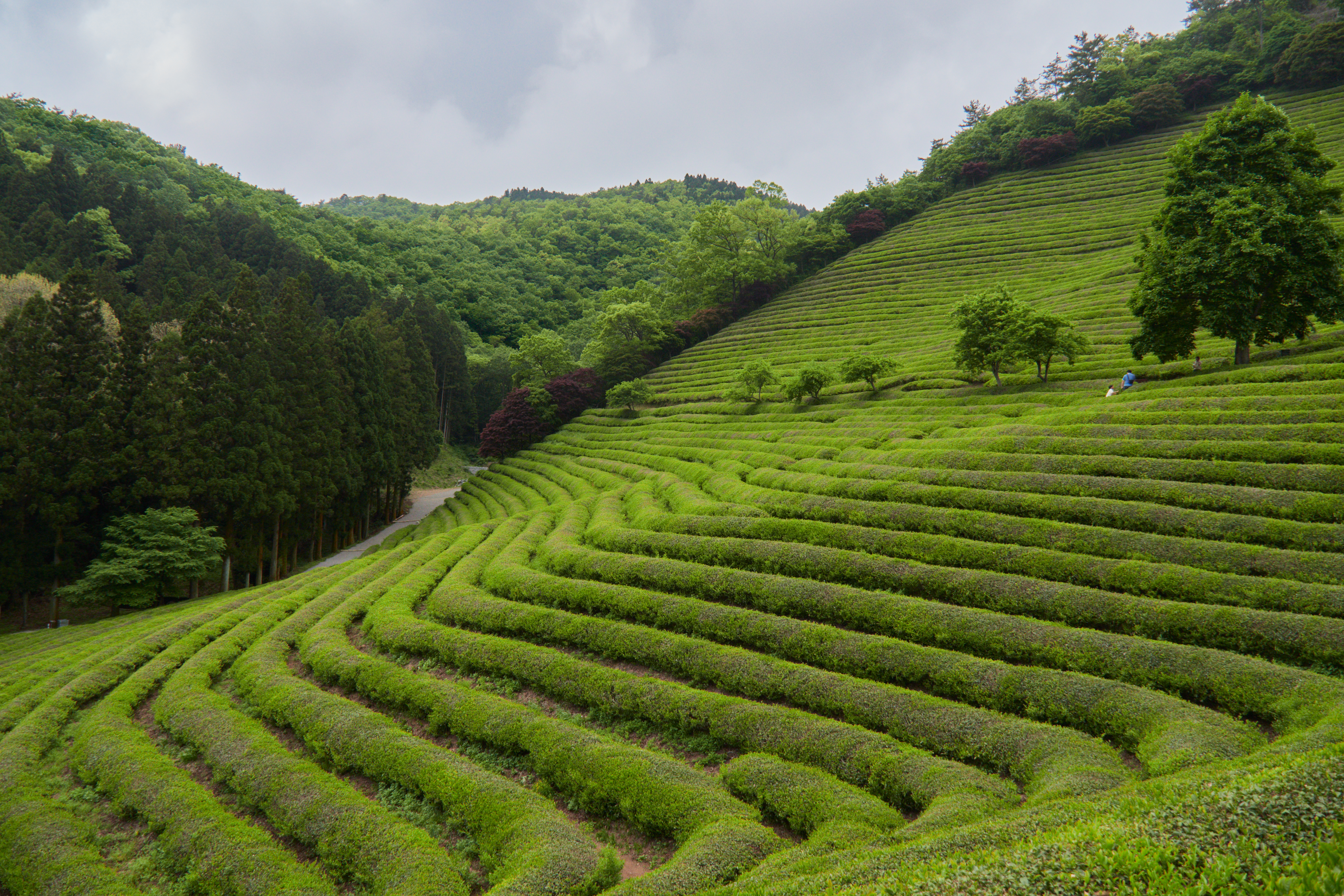
Terraced green tea fields on a hillside at Boseong Tea Plantation.

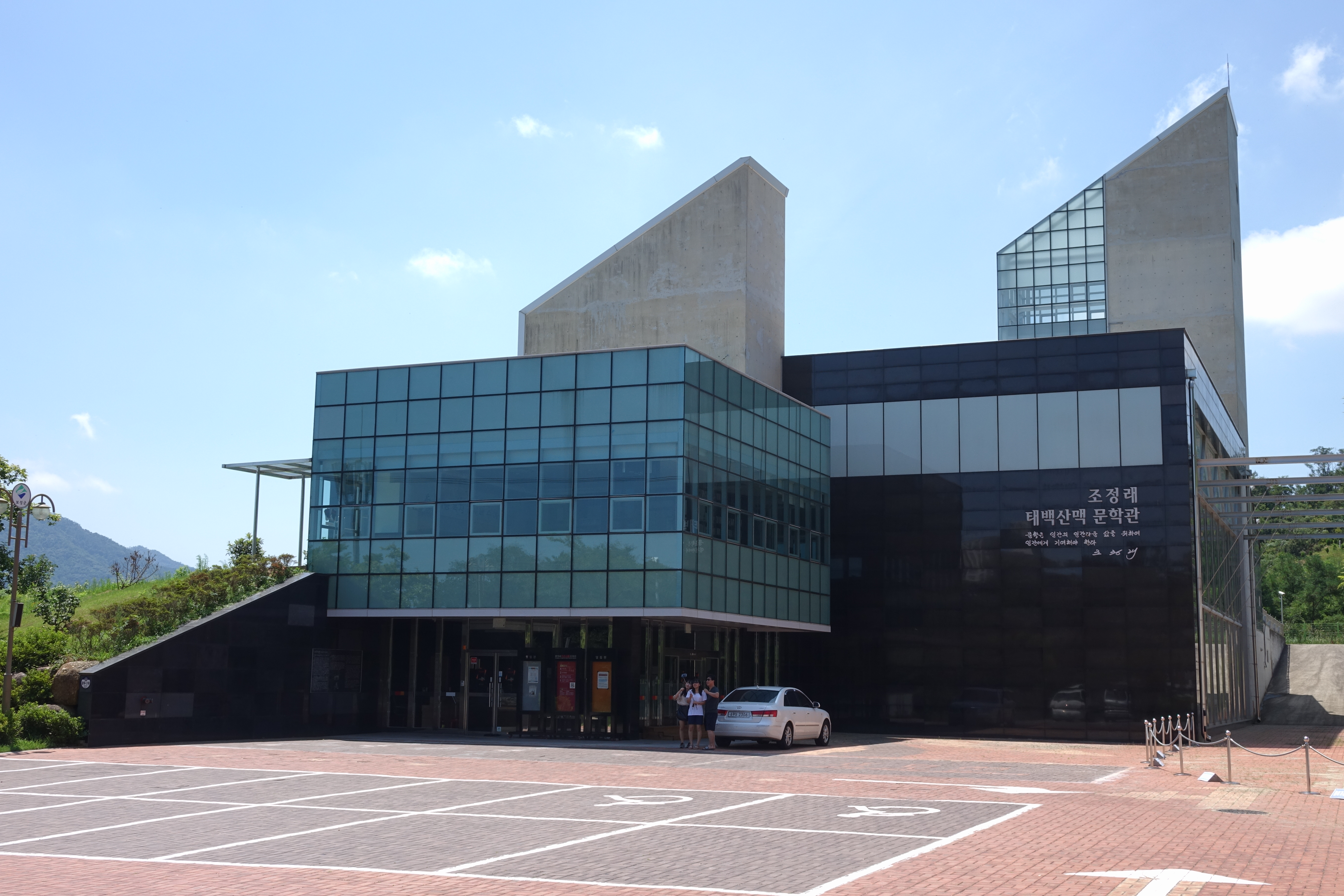
Jo Jeong-rae museum
