= Mapo A =

Constituency in Seoul, South Korea

- Single-member constituency for the National Assembly
- Location of the constituency
- District(s): Mapo District (part)
- Region: Seoul
- Electorate: 157,500 (2020)

Current constituency
- Created: 1988
- Seats: 1
- Party: People Power
- Member: Cho Jung-hun
- Created from: Mapo–Yongsan

Mapo A (Korean: 마포구 갑) is a constituency of the National Assembly of South Korea. The constituency consists of portions of Mapo District, Seoul. As of 2020, 157,500 eligible voters were registered in the constituency. The constituency was created in 1988 from the Mapo–Yongsan constituency.

== History ==
Throughout its history, Mapo A has voted for members of both conservative and liberal parties to represent the constituency. The liberal Peace Democratic Party's Roh Seung-hwan was the first to represent Mapo A in the National Assembly from May 30, 1988, to May 29, 1992. Roh left the Democratic Party (Note: successor party to the Peace Democratic Party) on February 9, 1992, due to the party not nominating him as its candidate for the constituency and refused to stand for election in the 1992 legislative election. He was succeeded by Park Myung-hwan of the conservative Democratic Liberal Party (later known as the New Korea Party) who represented the constituency from May 30, 1992, to May 29, 2004. Noh Woong-rae, the son of Roh Seung-hwan, won the constituency in the 2004 legislative election as a member of the liberal Uri Party. However, he lost the seat in the following election to Kang Seung-kyu of the conservative Grand National Party by a difference of 1,680 votes. Noh won back the seat in the 2012 legislative election and has served as Mapo A's member of the National Assembly since then, until 2024.

In the course of the 2024 South Korean legislative election, the Democratic Party, which Noh is a member of, labelled Mapo A as a "strategic constituency" and nominated former police officer Lee Ji-eun as the party's candidate for the constituency. Noh had previously been investigated and indicted by the Seoul Central District Prosecutor's Office on charges of bribery and violating South Korea's Political Funds Act. Noh strongly opposed the party's decision to not nominate him and began a hunger strike on February 22, 2024. He ended his hunger strike on March 9, 2024, citing that the party leadership had refused to reconsider their decision.

Cho Jung-hun of the People Power Party is the current MP for this constituency, having won a tight fight in the 2024 elections against aforementioned candidate Lee Ji-eun from the Democratic Party.

== Boundaries ==
The constituency encompasses the neighborhoods of Ahyeon-dong, Gongdeok-dong, Dohwa-dong, Yonggang-dong, Daeheung-dong, Yeomni-dong, and Sinsu-dong.

== List of members of the National Assembly ==
| Election | Member | Party | Dates | Notes |
|---|---|---|---|---|
| 1988 | Roh Seung-hwan | Peace Democratic (Note: Independent from February 9, 1992) | 1988–1992 | Deputy Speaker of the National Assembly (1988–1990) Left the Democratic Party on February 9, 1992 Mayor of Mapo (1995–2002) |
| 1992 | Park Myung-hwan | Democratic Liberal | 1992–2004 | |
| 1996 | Park Myung-hwan | New Korea | 1992–2004 | |
| 2000 | Park Myung-hwan | Grand National | 1992–2004 | |
| 2004 | Noh Woong-rae | Uri | 2004–2008 | |
| 2008 | Kang Seung-kyu | Grand National | 2008–2012 | |
| 2012 | Noh Woong-rae | Democratic United | 2012–2024 | Secretary General of the New Politics Alliance for Democracy (March 2014–June 2014) Director of The Institute for Democracy (June 23, 2021 – November 11, 2022) |
| 2016 | Noh Woong-rae | Democratic | 2012–2024 | Secretary General of the New Politics Alliance for Democracy (March 2014–June 2014) Director of The Institute for Democracy (June 23, 2021 – November 11, 2022) |
| 2020 | Noh Woong-rae | Democratic | 2012–2024 | Secretary General of the New Politics Alliance for Democracy (March 2014–June 2014) Director of The Institute for Democracy (June 23, 2021 – November 11, 2022) |
| 2024 | Cho Jung-hun | People Power | 2024–present | |

== Election results ==
=== 2024 ===
Legislative Election 2024: Mapo A
| Party | Candidate | Votes | % | ±% |
|---|---|---|---|---|
| People Power | Cho Jung-hun | 48,342 | 48.30 | ▲5.35 |
| Democratic | Lee Ji-eun | 47,743 | 47.70 | ▼8.29 |
| Green Justice | Kim Hye-mi | 2,033 | 2.03 | new |
| Reform | Kim Ki-jeong | 1,959 | 1.95 | new |
| Rejected ballots | | 1,009 | – | |
| Turnout | | 101,086 | 72.22 | ▲1.62 |
| Registered electors | | 139,968 | | |
| People Power gain from Democratic | | Swing | | |

=== 2020 ===
Legislative Election 2020: Mapo A
| Party | Candidate | Votes | % | ±% |
|---|---|---|---|---|
| Democratic | Noh Woong-rae | 53,160 | 55.99 | +4.07 |
| United Future | Kang Seung-kyu | 40,775 | 42.95 | +9.75 |
| Unification Democratic | Park Seon-ah | 512 | 0.95 | new |
| National Revolutionary | Kim Myung-sook | 482 | 0.53 | new |
| Rejected ballots | | 1,129 | – | |
| Turnout | | 96,058 | 70.6 | +7.16 |
| Registered electors | | 136,417 | | |
| Democratic hold | | Swing | | |

=== 2016 ===
Legislative Election 2016: Mapo A
| Party | Candidate | Votes | % | ±% |
|---|---|---|---|---|
| Democratic | Noh Woong-rae | 44,451 | 51.92 | −2.33 |
| Saenuri | Ahn Dae-hee | 28,429 | 33.20 | −9.63 |
| People | Hong Sung-moon | 7,786 | 9.09 | new |
| Independent | Kang Seung-kyu | 3,649 | 4.26 | new |
| Welfare State Party | Lee Sang-yi | 1,295 | 1.51 | new |
| Rejected ballots | | 791 | – | |
| Turnout | | 86,401 | 63.44 | +6.65 |
| Registered electors | | 136,193 | | |
| Democratic hold | | Swing | | |

=== 2012 ===
Legislative Election 2012: Mapo A
| Party | Candidate | Votes | % | ±% |
|---|---|---|---|---|
| Democratic United | Noh Woong-rae | 39,398 | 54.25 | +8.87 |
| Saenuri | Shin Young-sup | 31,104 | 42.83 | −5.22 |
| Real Democratic | Jeong Hyeong-ho | 2,119 | 2.91 | new |
| Rejected ballots | | 569 | – | |
| Turnout | | 73,190 | 56.79 | +10.99 |
| Registered electors | | 128,869 | | |
| Democratic United gain from Saenuri | | | | |

=== 2008 ===
Legislative Election 2008: Mapo A
| Party | Candidate | Votes | % | ±% |
|---|---|---|---|---|
| Grand National | Kang Seung-kyu | 30,203 | 48.05 | +8.96 |
| United Democratic | Noh Woong-rae | 28,523 | 45.38 | new |
| Democratic Labor | Yoon Sung-il | 3,204 | 5.09 | +0.43 |
| Family Party for Peace and Unity | Nam Ki-joon | 922 | 1.46 | new |
| Rejected ballots | | 660 | – | |
| Turnout | | 63,512 | 45.80 | −16.24 |
| Registered electors | | 138,661 | | |
| Grand National gain from United Democratic | | | | |

=== 2004 ===
Legislative Election 2004: Mapo A
| Party | Candidate | Votes | % | ±% |
|---|---|---|---|---|
| Uri | Noh Woong-rae | 35,842 | 44.21 | new |
| Grand National | Shin Young-sup | 31,693 | 39.09 | −8.49 |
| Millennium Democratic | Jeong Hyeong-ho | 6,514 | 8.10 | −36.94 |
| Democratic Labor | Chung Kwan-yong | 3,783 | 4.66 | new |
| Independent | Kang Young-won | 2,672 | 3.29 | new |
| Socialist | Cho Young-kwon | 506 | 0.62 | new |
| Rejected ballots | | 599 | – | |
| Turnout | | 81,669 | 62.04 | +6.74 |
| Registered electors | | 131,628 | | |
| Uri gain from Grand National | | Swing | | |

=== 2000 ===
Legislative Election 2000: Mapo A
| Party | Candidate | Votes | % | ±% |
|---|---|---|---|---|
| Grand National Party | Park Myung-hwan | 33,909 | 47.58 | new |
| Millennium Democratic | Kim Yoon-tae | 32,100 | 45.04 | new |
| Youth Progressive | Suh Sang-young | 2,519 | 3.53 | new |
| United Liberal Democrats | Lee Jong-soon | 1,911 | 2.68 | −12.22 |
| Democratic People's | Chin Young-hwan | 820 | 1.15 | new |
| Rejected ballots | | 567 | – | |
| Turnout | | 71,826 | 55.30 | −4.55 |
| Registered electors | | 129,887 | | |
| Grand National hold | | Swing | | |

=== 1996 ===
Legislative Election 1996: Mapo A
| Party | Candidate | Votes | % | ±% |
|---|---|---|---|---|
| New Korea | Park Myung-hwan | 31,022 | 40.79 | +0.13 |
| National Congress | Kim Yong-sool | 26,817 | 35.26 | new |
| United Liberal Democrats | Ko Soon-rye | 11,338 | 14.90 | new |
| Democratic | Kim Yong | 5,962 | 7.83 | new |
| Non-Partisan National Association | Ko Myung-kwan | 910 | 1.19 | new |
| Rejected ballots | | 1,496 | – | |
| Turnout | | 77,545 | 59.85 | −7.41 |
| Registered electors | | 129,561 | | |
| New Korea hold | | Swing | | |

=== 1992 ===
Legislative Election 1992: Mapo A
| Party | Candidate | Votes | % | ±% |
|---|---|---|---|---|
| Democratic Liberal | Park Myung-hwan | 39,098 | 40.66 | new |
| Democratic | Kim Yong-sool | 31,437 | 32.70 | new |
| Unification National | Kim Jae-young | 17,716 | 18.42 | new |
| New Political Reform | Kim Kyung-min | 5,137 | 5.34 | new |
| Independent | Ko Myung-kwan | 1,622 | 1.68 | new |
| Independent | Chin Young-hwan | 1,125 | 1.17 | new |
| Rejected ballots | | 1,087 | – | |
| Turnout | | 97,222 | 67.26 | −0.47 |
| Registered electors | | 144,540 | | |
| Democratic Liberal gain from Peace Democratic | | | | |

=== 1988 ===
Legislative Election 1988: Mapo A
| Party | Candidate | Votes | % | ±% |
|---|---|---|---|---|
| Peace Democratic | Roh Seung-hwan | 36,134 | 35.71 | new |
| Democratic Justice | Park Myung-hwan | 29,836 | 29.48 | new |
| Reunification Democratic | Park Hong-sup | 25,012 | 24.71 | new |
| New Democratic Republican | Lee Jong-soon | 10,203 | 10.08 | new |
| Rejected ballots | | 862 | – | |
| Turnout | | 102,047 | 67.73 | – |
| Registered electors | | 150,678 | | |
| Peace Democratic win (new seat) | | | | |

== See also ==
- List of constituencies of the National Assembly of South Korea
