= Chung Hong-won =

South Korean politician (born 1944)

His Excellency Jung Hong-won
- 정홍원
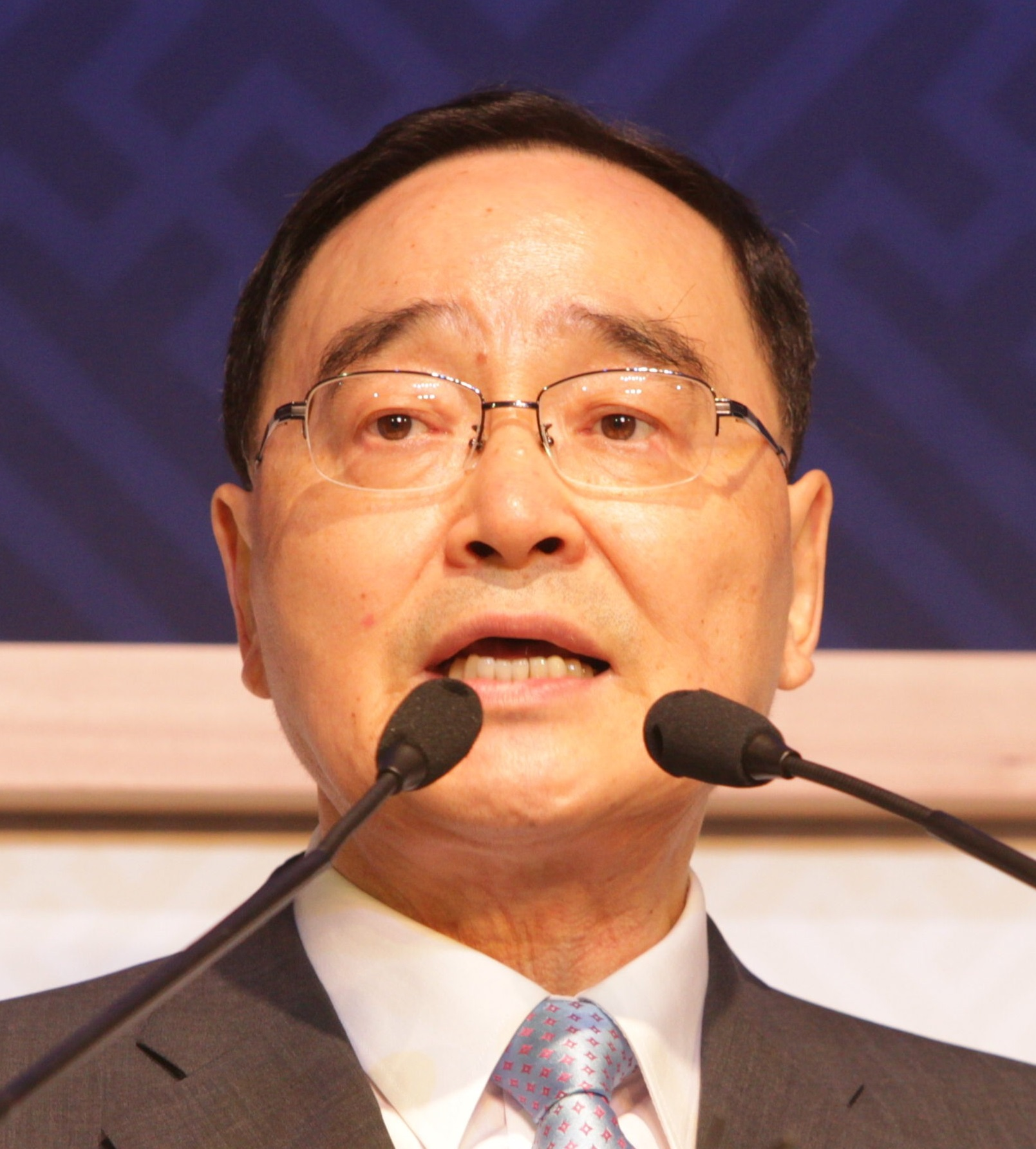
- Chung in 2013

42nd Prime Minister of South Korea
- In office 26 February 2013 – 16 February 2015
- President: Park Geun Hye
- Preceded by: Kim Hwang-sik
- Succeeded by: Lee Wan-koo

Personal details
- Born: 9 October 1944 (age 81) Kato County, Korea, Empire of Japan
- Party: Saenuri Party
- Education: Sungkyunkwan University (LLB)

Korean name
- Hangul: 정홍원
- Hanja: 鄭烘原
- RR: Jeong Hongwon
- MR: Chŏng Hongwŏn

Jung Hong-won (Korean: 정홍원; born 9 October 1944) is a South Korean politician who served as the prime minister of South Korea from 2013 to 2015 under President Park Geun Hye. Jung is a former member of the Saenuri Party.

== Early life and education ==
Jung graduated with a Bachelor of Laws (undergraduate) from Sungkyunkwan University. After passing the Judicial Examination, he became a prosecutor.

== Career ==
Jung became known after solving several high-profile cases, such as the Lee-Chang scandal, in which relatives of President Chun Doo-hwan were prosecuted, and the Walker Hill Casino scandal.

Jung resigned from his job as a prosecutor in 2003 and then served the president of the Institute of Justice. From 2004 to 2006, he served as the Standing Commissioner of the Republic of Korea National Election Commission. From 2008 to 2011, he served as the president of Korea Legal Aid Corporation.

Before the 2012 general election, he entered the Saenuri Party. On 8 February 2013, he was nominated as the first Prime Minister of President-elect Park Geun-hye's government. On 26 February 2013, after the National Assembly of South Korea confirmed his nomination, he was formally sworn in. On 27 April 2014, he tendered his prime ministership resignation to the president following the Sinking of the MV Sewol on 16 April 2014, during which more than 300 people were killed. President Park accepted the resignation in principle, but Jung continued to lead the Cabinet after the search and rescue operations of the Sewol came to an end. Few were nominated to replace Jung, including Ahn Dae-hee, but none of them were able to replace him.

Jung was formally replaced as prime minister on 16 February 2015.

Political offices
Preceded by Kim Hwang-sik	Prime Minister of South Korea; 2013–2015	Succeeded by Lee Wan-koo
