= Transition Korea =

2020–2023 political party in South Korea

Transition Korea 시대전환 時代轉換
- Leader: Cho Jung-hun
- Secretary-General: Lee Jae-hoo
- Floor Leader: Cho Jung-hun
- Chair of the Policy Planning Committee: Park Sook-hyun
- Founded: 23 February 2020
- Registered: 6 March 2020
- Dissolved: 9 November 2023
- Split from: Democratic Party
- Merged into: People Power Party
- Headquarters: Gukhoe-daero, Yeongdeungpo, Seoul
- Political position: Centre
- National affiliation: Platform Party (until 2020)
- Colours: Purple

Website
- www.transition.kr/home/

Transition Korea (TK; Korean: 시대전환; Hanja: 時代轉換; RR: Sidae jeonhwan) was an anti-establishment political party in South Korea.

The party was established by Cho Jung-hoon and Lee Won-jae on 23 February 2020. It officially identifies as neither conservative nor progressive, but as pragmatic. Lee Won-jae, one of the co-Presidents, supports a basic income.

In the 2020 election, the party joined the Platform Party alliance, but at the beginning there were speculations that the party would form an alliance with the Minsaeng Party. Cho Jung-hoon ran 6th in the Platform Party list and was elected. On 12 May 2020, Cho was officially expelled from the Platform Party and returned to this party.

On 9 November 2023, Party leader Cho agreed to a merger of the Party with the conservative People Power ahead of the 2024 South Korean legislative election.
