= Kim Min-seok (politician) =

Prime Minister of South Korea 2025–2026

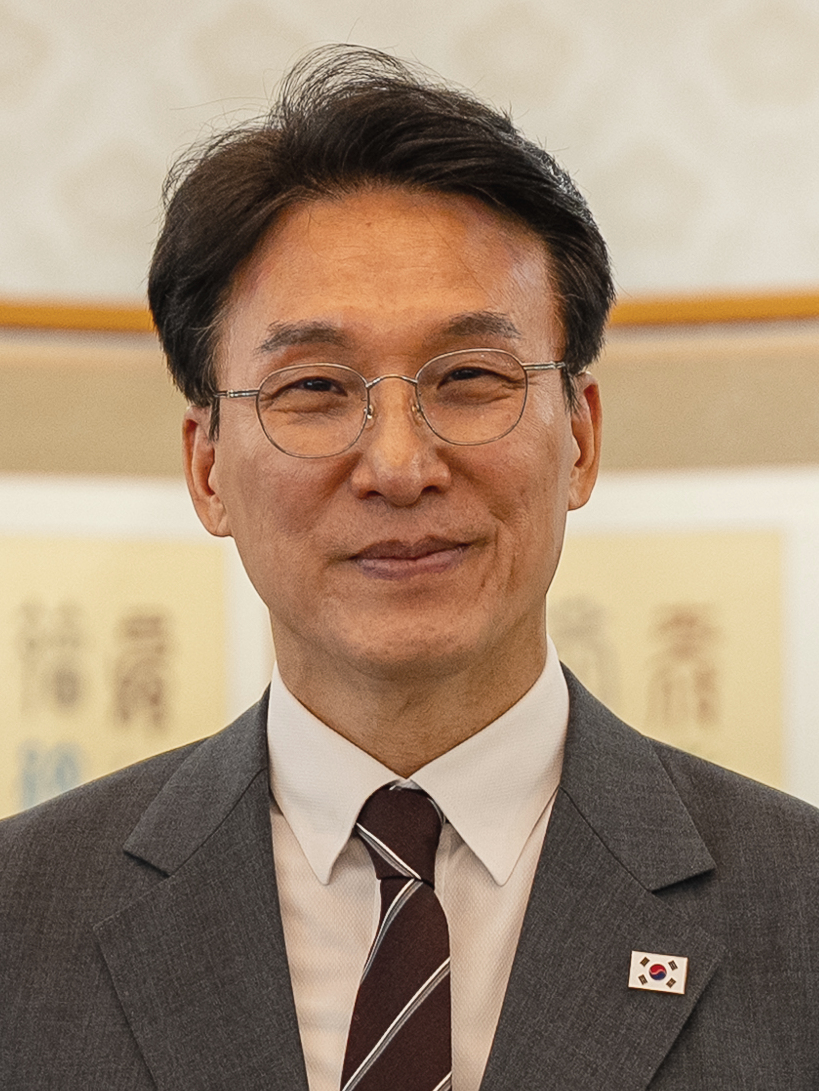
- Kim in 2026

Leader of the Democratic Party of Korea (Note: The party was established in 2015. It is different from the Democratic Party (2014), which he had also served as president of in 2016.)
- Incumbent
- Assumed office 17 August 2026
- Preceded by: Jung Chung-rae; Han Byung-do (acting)

49th Prime Minister of South Korea
- In office 3 July 2025 – 30 June 2026
- President: Lee Jae Myung
- Deputy: Koo Yun-cheol; Choi Kyo-jin; Bae Kyung-hoon
- Preceded by: Han Duck-soo; Lee Ju-ho (acting) (Note: Han Duck-soo as permanent prime minister.)
- Succeeded by: Han Seong-sook

Leader of the Democratic Party (2014)
- In office 30 January 2016 – 31 October 2016; Serving with Park Joon-young until 14 March 2016
- Preceded by: Kang Shin-sung
- Succeeded by: Position abolished

Member of the National Assembly
- Incumbent
- Assumed office 30 May 2020
- Preceded by: Shin Kyoung-min
- Constituency: Yeongdeungpo B (Seoul)
- In office 30 May 1996 – 27 May 2002
- Preceded by: Rha Woong-bae
- Succeeded by: Kwon Young-se
- Constituency: Yeongdeungpo B (Seoul)

Personal details
- Born: 29 May 1964 (age 62) Jongno, Seoul, South Korea
- Party: Democratic (2015) (since 2016)
- Other political affiliations: Democratic (1990) (1990–1991); Democratic (1991) (1991–1995); NCNP (1995–2000); MDP (2000–2002; 2003–2005); National Integration 21 (2002-03); Democratic (2005) (2005–2007); UNDP (2007–2008); UDP (2008); Democratic (2008) (2008–2010); Democratic (2014) (2014–2016)
- Spouses: Kim Ja-young (m. 1993; div. 2014) Lee Tae-rin (m. 2019)
- Children: 2
- Education: Seoul National University (BA); Harvard University (MPA); Tsinghua University (JM); Rutgers University–Newark (JD)

Korean name
- Hangul: 김민석
- Hanja: 金民錫
- RR: Gim Minseok
- MR: Kim Minsŏk

Kim Min-seok (Korean: 김민석; born 29 May 1964) is a South Korean politician, activist and educator who has served as the Prime minister of South Korea from 2025 to 2026 and as the leader of the Democratic Party of Korea (DPK) since 2026. He has been a member of the National Assembly for Seoul Yeongdeungpo District B from 1996 to 2002 and again since 2020.

Born in Seoul, Kim has degrees from Seoul National University, Harvard University, Tsinghua University, and Rutgers University. He was detained for occupying the American Culture Centre in Seoul, but was pardoned by President Roh Tae-woo. Kim was elected to the National Assembly in the 1996 election, and was regarded as one of rising stars of the Democratic Party during that period. However, his loss in the Mayor of Seoul election in 2002 to Lee Myung-bak contributed to a decline in his popularity. Kim's career suffered further following corruption convictions in 2002 and 2010, which contributed to additional losses in the 2004, 2008, and 2016 South Korean legislative elections.

Kim was able to make a political comeback when he was once again elected as the MP for the Seoul Yeongdeungpo B constituency in the 2020 election, marking a return to the National Assembly after 18 years. A close ally of President Lee Jae Myung, he was nominated as prime minister in June 2025 and confirmed the following month despite a boycott from the opposition People Power Party.

== Early life and education ==
Kim Min-seok was born on 29 May 1964 in Seoul, the youngest of three children born to Kim Joo-wan and Kim Choon-ok. His oldest brother, Kim Min-woong, is the Pastor of Gillbott Church in River Edge, New Jersey, United States. His second eldest brother, Kim Min-hwa, died in 1987 due to a traffic collision.

He attended Soongsil High School and studied sociology at Seoul National University. In 1982, his brother Kim Min-woong went to the United States to study political science at the University of Delaware but soon changed his mind to be a pastor. However, he led a reunification movement while there and therefore was unable to return to South Korea until 2002 due to the breach of the National Security Act. 3 years later, Kim Min-seok was elected the President of the Student Council at his university but was sentenced to 5 years and 6 months in jail for leading the American Culture Centre occupation case. He was released on 27 February 1988 after being pardoned by the newly-elected President Roh Tae-woo. Following his detention, his mother Kim Choon-ok established the Council for the Movement of Families for the Fulfillment of Democracy, a pro-democracy organisation. Ms. Kim visited her oldest son in 1999, as until then she could not make it as the Embassy of the United States refused her application for visa due to her youngest son's activist career.

In 1987, Ms. Kim lost her second son, Kim Min-hwa. At the hospital mortuary, Kim Dae-jung, who later became the country's president, visited her. Around that period, Kim Min-seok himself grew closer to the future President.

Kim received a Juris Master degree from Tsinghua University in China in 2010.

== Early political career (1990–92) ==
Kim started his political career in 1990 when he joined the Democratic Party, known as the Little Democrats, led by Lee Ki-taek. He, therefore, did not share a same party with Kim Dae-jung, who led the Peace Democratic Party (PDP) at that time, till both the PDP and the Little Democrats were merged and re-founded as the Democratic Party in 1991.

Prior to the 1992 election, Kim was nominated the Democratic candidate for Yeongdeungpo District 2nd constituency by the co-Presidents, Kim Dae-jung and Lee Ki-taek. He faced off against the former Deputy Prime Minister and the ruling Democratic Liberal Party (DLP) nominee Rha Woong-bae but lost to the DLP candidate by a margin of 260 votes. He demanded a recount but the margin was slightly widened for 25 votes.

Following the defeat, Kim moved to the United States for a Master of Public Administration from John F. Kennedy School of Government of Harvard University. He returned to South Korea prior to the 1995 local elections where he helped his party's nominee for the Mayor of Seoul Cho Soon. He attracted the youth votes and Cho was elected to the position.

== National Assembly (1996–2002) ==
In the 1996 election, Kim was nominated the candidate of the National Congress for New Politics (NCNP) for Yeongdeungpo District 2nd and faced off with Choi Young-han, an actor, broadcaster and the nominee of the ruling New Korea Party (NKP). He contested under the slogan, "Kim to the Parliament, Choi to the Stage" (김민석을 국회로, 최불암은 무대로). He successfully defeated the famous actor; being just 32 years old, he was the youngest MP as well as the opposition candidate received the highest votes in Seoul.

He gained public attention during the hearing of Hanbo Group in 1997, held due to its CEO Jeong Tae-soo who was implicated in various corruption cases. Though he could not receive any replies from the CEO Jeong, he proved that the testimonies of Jeong was widely manipulated. From this event, he was called as "The Hearing Star" (청문회 스타) by many people.

At the end of 1999 when the NCNP was on the way to re-establish as the Millennium Democratic Party (MDP), he served as the Spokesperson of the Preparatory Committee. He also established his own organisation named Youth Korea in order to expand the supports. On 29 October, he was selected as one of the "20 Asian Youth Leader of the Millennium" by Asiaweek, a Hong Kong-based English news magazine, along with Choo Mi-ae. In January 2000, he was again chosen as one of the "100 Global Leaders in 2000" by the World Economic Forum (WEF).

Kim was re-elected in the 2000 election, but his MDP and the coalition partner, the Alliance of Liberal Democrats (ALDE), fell short of a majority. Nevertheless, on 17 May 2000, he and some other MPs provoked a controversy when they went to a karaoke bar named Millennial NHK after the eve memorial ceremony of the Gwangju Uprising. He was also criticised in the end of year when he denounced the party's minority wing and supported the majority wing for the party's reform.

== 2002 Seoul mayoral election ==
Prior to the 2002 presidential election, Kim was the second most popular candidate within the MDP. In a survey of Sisa Journal in November 1999, he was selected as the best future leader of the 21st century. He, instead, made a decision to stand for the Mayor of Seoul, as he was ineligible to run for presidential election due to the age restrictions; being just 38 years old, any presidential candidates must be at least 40 years old.

For the 2002 local election, the MDP was planning to nominate the then Mayor Goh Kun as its candidate, but he declared to not seek re-election. Should Goh not stand, Kim was one of the "new faces" of the party, along with Choo Mi-ae. On 25 February 2002, he announced he would participate in the MDP preselection. On 2 April, he received 52.1% and defeated Lee Sang-su.

He ran under 2 slogans, "The new era needs a new leader" and "New start, now the quality of life". He promised eco-friendly manifestos i.e. adopting natural gas bus, stricter air pollution control and so on. In addition, he planned his mayorship would be "predictable".

Kim faced off against the GNP candidate, Lee Myung-bak, who later became the President. Despite the early lead, many polls showed that the support between the two candidates were neck and neck. When the campaign was officially begun, some supporters worried if Kim would lose to Lee due to low turnout. On 13 June, amid the 2002 FIFA World Cup and the corruption scandal of the President's sons, Kim only received 43.02% and came behind to Lee (52.28%). His constituency, in which he resigned in order to participate in the mayoral election, was taken over by the GNP candidate Kwon Yeong-se.

On 17 October 2002, Kim announced his departure from the MDP and participation as the Council for a Unity Candidate, where its members had withdrawn their supports to the MDP candidate Roh Moo-hyun and backed the National Unity 21 candidate Chung Mong-joon. His decision was harshly criticised in public, including by the other MDP MPs such as Im Jong-seok. Because of his actions, he was given a nickname "migratory bird" (철새), a term that refers to politicians who like to change their minds or party membership for their own benefit. In a later interview, he rued his decision.

=== Aftermath ===
In the 2004 election, Kim ran for Yeongdeungpo District 1st to return as an MP, but amid the impeachment of the President Roh Moo-hyun, the MDP's support plummeted. Kim also came behind Goh Jin-hwa and Kim Myung-seop. Just after a month, he was arrested for allegations of corruption relating to conduct during the 2002 local elections. He was sentenced to eight months in jail with a stay of execution for four years. Due to this, his bid for the 2008 election was refused by the United Democratic Party (UDP). Despite his election as the Vice President at the 6 July leadership election, he was again arrested in the end of year for corruption allegations. In May 2010, he contested the Democratic preselection for Busan mayorship while he was amid a trial, but was defeated by Kim Chŏng-gil. Three months later, he was sentenced a 6-million-won (~ 6,000 US$) fine and was prohibited from participating in politics for five years.

In 2014, Kim joined as a consultant for the newly-formed Democratic Party, known as the Extra-parliamentary Democrats aka Democratic (K). On 30 January 2016, he was elected the co-President of the party, alongside the former Governor of South Jeolla Province Park Joon-young. For the 2016 election, he ran 2nd in his party list but was not elected as the party did not pass the 3% threshold. In September, the party announced its merger into the Democratic Party of Korea (DPK).

== Return to the National Assembly (2020–2025) ==
On 16 January 2020, Kim declared his candidacy for Yeongdeungpo District 2nd in the 2020 election. From his declaration, he said that he was supposed to restart from his home constituency although he still had opportunities to run for other constituencies. He participated the DPK preselection and defeated the incumbent Sin Kyŏng-min. Ironically, Sin became the first incumbent MP to lose at DPK preselection.

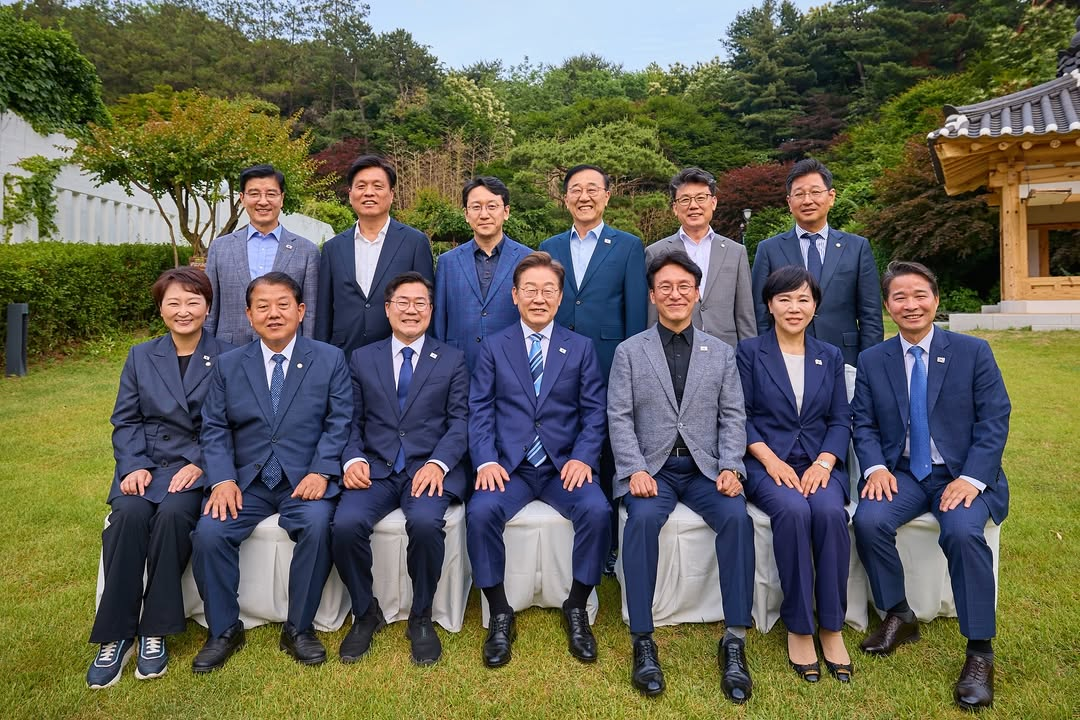
Kim Min-seok and Lee Jae-myung pose for a group photo with DPK lawmakers on 7 June 2025

During the election campaign, Kim contested under the slogan, "Make Yeongdeungpo as Ildeungpo" (영등포를 일등포로 만들겠습니다); the word ildeung means the "1st place" in Korean. He pledged to restore Daebangcheon, which was inspired from a manifesto of Lee Myung-bak (to restore Chunggyecheon) whom he used to face off against 18 years ago.

In the exit poll on 15 April, Kim came behind to the United Future candidate Park Yong-chan (Kim: 46.9%, Park: 48.3%). Nevertheless, the official result showed that Kim received 50.2% and defeated Park with a majority of 5.9%.

Kim argued that anti-discrimination law with LGBTQ protection infringes on the freedom of religion and expression of the Christian community. He said, "If homosexuality is chosen by all people, humanity cannot sustain," and "Therefore, it cannot be a universal value or a relativistic area that can be advocated even if the position changes." He also argued that "There may be cases where people come into contact with homosexuality due to existential concerns, but looking at recent reality, it is clear that there are cases where people come into contact with or spread it due to the social atmosphere." He argued, "At the very least, sexual attempts swept away by the atmosphere should be prevented, and religious freedom to point out and criticize such things should be guaranteed."

== Premiership (2025–2026) ==
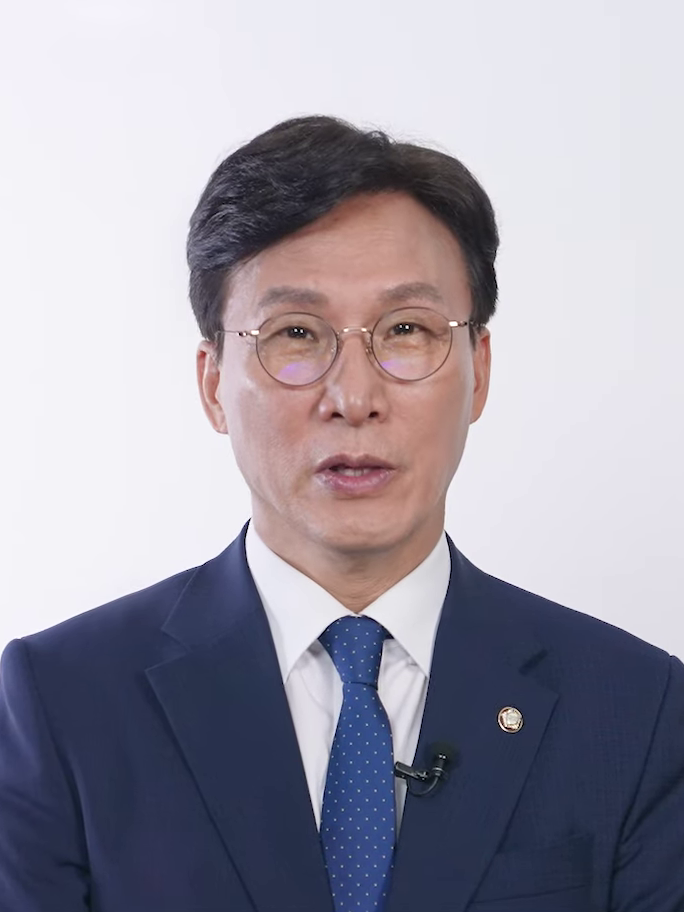
- Premiership of Kim Min-seok; 4 July 2025 – 30 June 2026
- President: Lee Jae Myung
- Cabinet: Full list
- Party: Democratic
- Seat: Sejong City

Following Lee Jae Myung's election as President of South Korea in the 2025 South Korean presidential election, Kim was appointed as Prime Minister of South Korea. His nomination awaited approval from the South Korean National Assembly. His two day parliamentary confirmation hearing began on 24 June 2025. The second and final confirmation hearing for Kim at the National Assembly was held on 25 June 2025. The National Assembly approved Kim's nomination on 3 July 2025 following a 173-3 vote and a boycott by the opposition People Power Party.

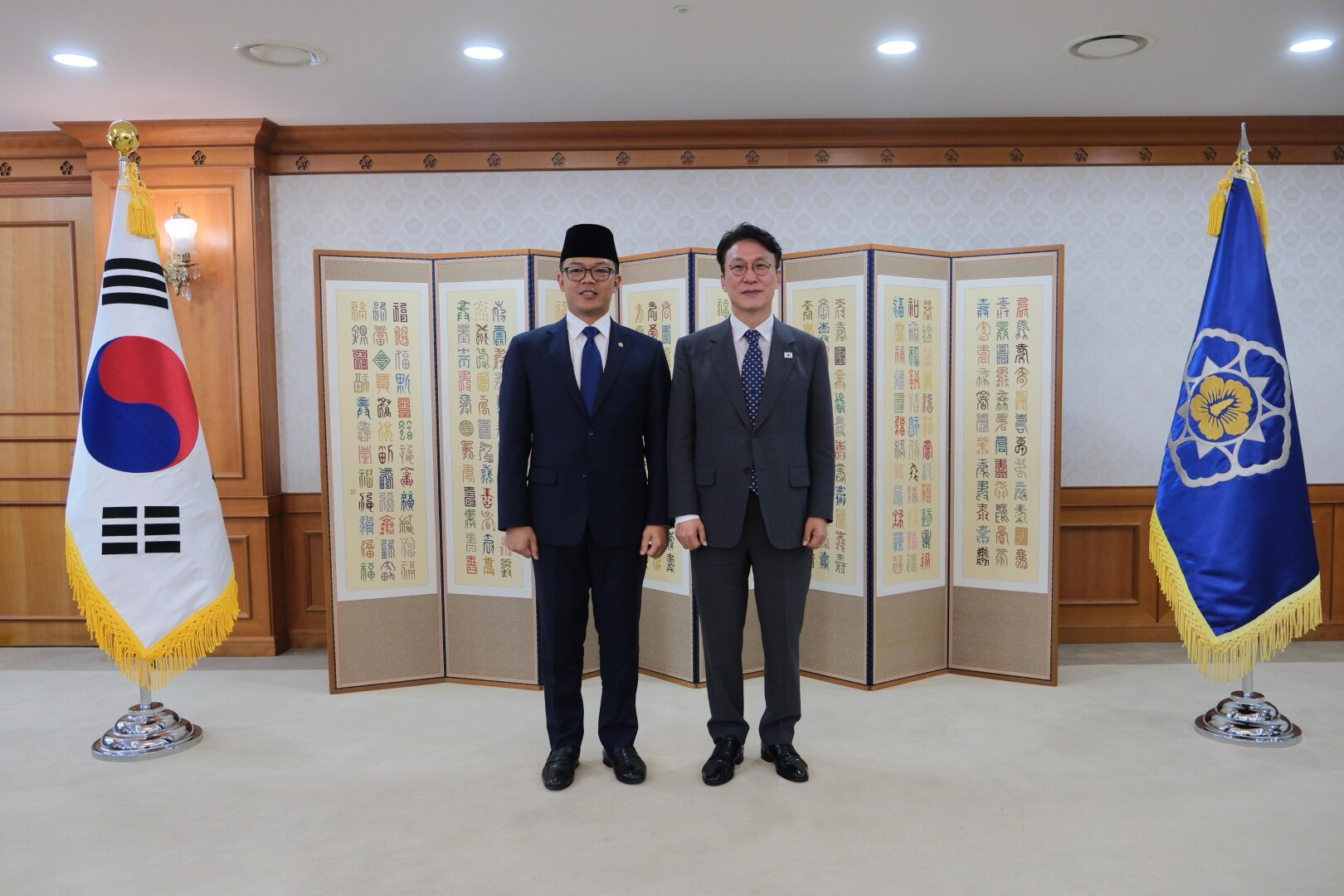
Kim meets Indonesian foreign minister Sugiono at Prime Minister's Office in Seoul on 21 August 2025.

On 7 July 2025, Kim was officially inaugurated as Prime Minister at the Government Complex in Sejong City. In his inauguration ceremony speech, he will "become a chief aide" who will "usher in a new era for the great Republic of Korea, great people and a great president by overcoming the scars of insurrection and a second IMF (1997 Asian financial crisis) crisis."

Since taking the office as Prime Minister, Kim has bearing the official nickname as "Early Morning Prime Minister" (Korean: 새벽총리), which emphasize that he is an early-morning person who early to work for state affairs since dawn.

On 13 January 2026, Kim officially ordered a comprehensive joint investigation into what he described as "pseudoreligious cults," specifically naming the Unification Church and the Shincheonji Church of Jesus. Speaking at the first extraordinary Cabinet meeting of 2026, Kim labelled these groups a "social evil" and directed all government ministries to collaborate on active measures to eradicate their harm.

On 30 June 2026, Kim officially stepped down from office after President Lee Jae Myung approved the National Assembly's confirmation of Han Seong-sook as prime minister.

After his premiership, on 7 July 2026, Kim announced his candidacy for the leader of the Democratic Party. On 17 August, Kim was elected as the leader of the party, defeating incumbent leader Jung Chung-rae with around 54 percent of the vote.

== Personal life ==
Kim Min-seok was first married to Kim Ja-young, a newsreader known for World Trend Music, whom he met at a coffee shop at the new wing of Korean Broadcasting System (KBS) in June 1992. The couple married on 6 March 1993 and had a son and a daughter. In March 2015, it was reported they had already divorced in December 2014.

On 24 November 2019, Kim posted on his Facebook that he would remarry on 12 December. He married Lee Tae-rin.

== Electoral results ==
=== General elections ===
Year	Elections	Constituency	Political party	Votes (%)	Remarks
1992	14th National Assembly General Election	Yeongdeungpo B (Seoul)	Democratic (1991)	48,151 (40.95%)	Defeated (2nd)
1996	15th National Assembly General Election	Yeongdeungpo B (Seoul)	NCNP	49,657 (48.87%)	Won
2000	16th National Assembly General Election	Yeongdeungpo B (Seoul)	MDP	50,438 (60.39%)	Won
2004	17th National Assembly General Election	Yeongdeungpo A (Seoul)	MDP	21,033 (20.88%)	Defeated (3rd)
2016	20th National Assembly General Election	PR (2nd)	Democratic (2014)	209,872 (0.88%)	Not Elected
2020	21st National Assembly General Election	Yeongdeungpo B (Seoul)	Democratic (2015)	47,075 (50.26%)	Won
2024	22nd National Assembly General Election	Yeongdeungpo B (Seoul)	Democratic (2015)	49,651 (50.18%)	Won

=== Local elections ===
==== Mayor of Seoul ====
Year	Elections	constituency	Political party	Votes (%)	Remarks
2002	3rd Iocal Election	Seoul (Mayoral Elections)	MDP	1,496,754 (43.02%)	Defeated (2nd)

== Notes ==
National Assembly of the Republic of Korea
Preceded by Rha Woong-bae	Member of the National Assembly for Yeongdeungpo B (Seoul); 30 May 1996–27 May 2002	Succeeded by Kwon Young-se
Preceded by Shin Kyoung-min	Member of the National Assembly for Yeongdeungpo B (Seoul); 30 May 2020–	Incumbent
Political offices
Preceded by Han Duck-soo; Choi Sang-mok (Acting); Lee Ju-ho (Acting)	Prime Minister of South Korea; 3 July 2025–30 June 2026	Succeeded by Han Seong-sook
Party political offices
Preceded by Jung Chung-rae; Han Byung-do (Acting)	Leader of the Democratic Party; 17 August 2026–	Incumbent
