= Cheong Yang-seog =

South Korean politician

- 정양석
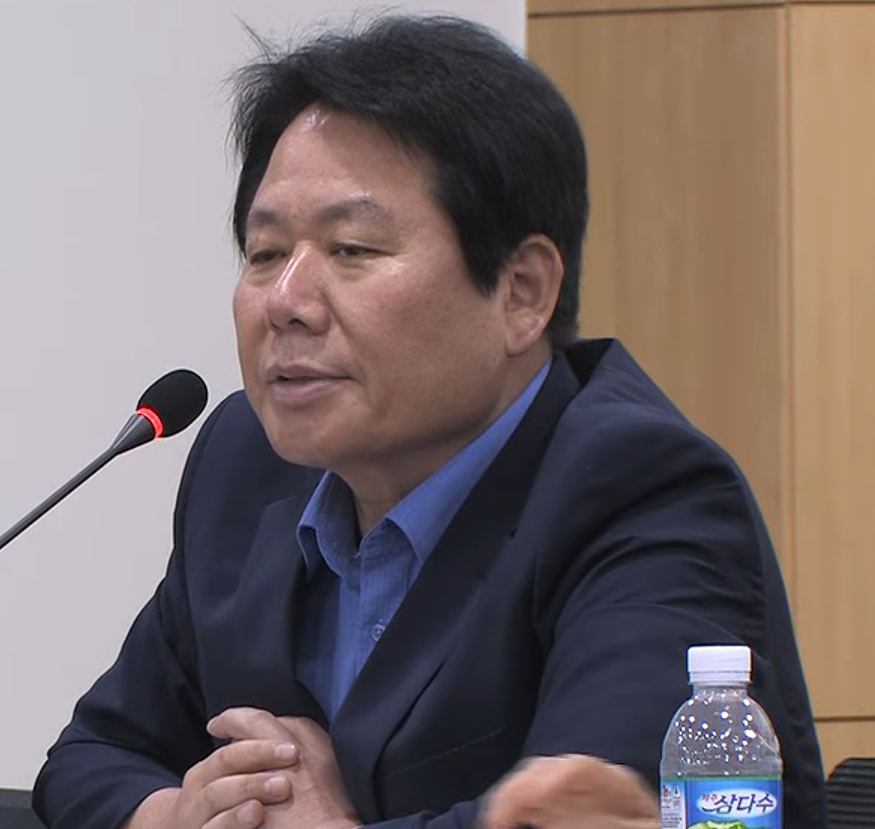

Secretary-General of the People Power Party
- In office 19 October 2020 – 11 June 2021
- President: Kim Chong-in (acting)
- Preceded by: Kim Seon-dong
- Succeeded by: Han Ki-ho

Member of the National Assembly for Gangbuk A (Seoul)
- In office 30 May 2016 – 29 May 2020
- Preceded by: Oh Young-sik
- Succeeded by: Cheon Jun-ho
- In office 30 May 2008 – 29 May 2012
- Preceded by: Oh Young-sik
- Succeeded by: Oh Young-sik

Personal details
- Born: 25 November 1958 (age 67) Boseong, South Jeolla, South Korea
- Citizenship: South Korean
- Party: People Power
- Education: Chonnam National University; Sogang University

- Cheong Yang-seog
- Hangul: 정양석
- Hanja: 鄭亮碩
- RR: Jeong Yangseok
- MR: Chŏng Yangsŏk

Cheong Yang-seog (Korean: 정양석; Hanja: 鄭亮碩; born 25 November 1958) is a South Korean politician in the conservative People Power Party who was elected member of the National Assembly for Gangbuk, Seoul, in the 2016 parliamentary election. He previously represented the same constituency between 2008 and 2012.

In his first term as an assemblyman, Cheong was a member of the Assembly's Strategy and Finance Committee. In 2010, he introduced a bill to increase the basic tax deduction for salaried workers from 1 million to 2 million South Korean won. He was appointed Second Deputy Secretary-General of the Saenuri Party in 2014.

Cheong was born in Boseong County, South Jeolla Province, and studied at the Korea Army Officer Candidate School before taking a course in political science at Sogang University. He entered politics as a member of the Democratic Justice Party of President Chun Doo-hwan in 1984.

On 19 October 2020, he was appointed the new Secretary-General of the People Power Party (PPP), replacing Kim Seon-dong who had resigned 5 days ago.

== Election results ==
Year	Elections	Constituency	Political party	Votes (%)	Results
2008	18th National Assembly General Election	Gangbuk A (Seoul)	GNP	27,429 (48.21%)	Won
2012	19th National Assembly General Election	Gangbuk A (Seoul)	Saenuri	32,098 (44.86%)	Defeated (2nd)
2016	20th National Assembly General Election	Gangbuk A (Seoul)	Saenuri	30,098 (39.52%)	Won
2020	21st National Assembly General Election	Gangbuk A (Seoul)	UFP	33,840 (39.49%)	Defeated (2nd)
