= Democratic Party (South Korea, 2014) =

2014–2016 political party in South Korea

Democratic Party 민주당
- Leader: Kim Min-seok
- Founded: September 21, 2014
- Dissolved: October 19, 2016
- Merged into: Democratic Party of Korea
- Ideology: Liberalism (South Korean)
- Political position: Centre to centre-left

The Democratic Party (Korean: 민주당; Hanja: 民主黨; RR: Minjudang) was a centrist political party in South Korea established on September 21, 2014. The party had one representative in the 19th National Assembly, Shin Ki-nam, formerly a member of the Minjoo Party of Korea. The party lost its seat in the 2016 legislative election. On October 19, 2016, the party officially merged with the Democratic Party of Korea.
