= Gangbuk A =

Constituency in Seoul, South Korea

- Single-member constituency for the National Assembly
- Location of the constituency
- District(s): Gangbuk District (part)
- Region: Seoul
- Electorate: 132,265 (2024)

Current constituency
- Created: 1996
- Seats: 1
- Party: Democratic Party
- Member: Cheon Jun-ho
- Created from: Dobong C

Gangbuk A (Korean: 강북구 갑) is a constituency of the National Assembly of South Korea. The constituency consists of parts of Gangbuk District, Seoul. As of 2024, 132,265 eligible voters were registered in the constituency. The constituency was created in 1996 after being reorganized from the Dobong C constituency.

== History ==
Since its establishment, Gangbuk A has more often elected members of centre-left, liberal parties to represent the constituency. Kim Won-gil of the centrist-liberal National Congress for New Politics was the first member to represent the constituency. Kim won re-election in 2000 as a member of the centre-left Millennium Democratic Party, but joined the conservative Grand National Party ahead of the 2002 South Korean presidential election. Kim ran as the Grand National Party's nominee for Gangbuk A in the 2004 election, but was defeated by Oh Yeong-sik of the liberal Uri Party by more than ten points. In the following election, Oh was defeated by Cheong Yang-seog of the Grand National Party. However, in the 2012 election, Oh won back the seat in a rematch against Cheong. Cheong won back the seat in 2016 as a member of the conservative Saenuri Party, securing 39.52% of the vote and narrowly beating out Democratic challenger Cheon Jun-ho. Cheong lost to Cheon Jun-ho in the following election, who won in a landslide with 57.75% of the vote. Cheon won re-election in 2024 in a one-on-one battle against Jun Sang-bum of the conservative People Power Party.

== Boundaries ==
The constituency encompasses the neighborhoods of Beon 1-dong, Beon 2-dong, Ui-dong, Insu-dong, and Suyu-dong.

== List of members of the National Assembly ==
| Election | Member | Party | Dates | Notes |
|---|---|---|---|---|
| 1996 | Kim Won-gil | National Congress | 1996–2004 | Minister of the Health and Welfare (2001–2002); Secretary General of the Millennium Democratic Party (2002); Left the Millennium Democratic Party on 4 November 2002, joined the Grand National Party on 26 November 2002 |
| 2000 | Kim Won-gil | Millennium Democratic (Note: member of the Grand National Party from November 26, 2002) | 1996–2004 | Minister of the Health and Welfare (2001–2002); Secretary General of the Millennium Democratic Party (2002); Left the Millennium Democratic Party on 4 November 2002, joined the Grand National Party on 26 November 2002 |
| 2004 | Oh Yeong-sik | Uri | 2004–2008 | |
| 2008 | Cheong Yang-seog | Grand National | 2008–2012 | |
| 2012 | Oh Yeong-sik | Democratic United | 2012–2016 | Chairman of the Korail (2018); Chief Secretary to the Prime Minister of South Korea (2021–2022) |
| 2016 | Cheong Yang-seog | Saenuri | 2016–2020 | Secretary General of the People Power Party (2020–2021) |
| 2020 | Cheon Jun-ho | Democratic | 2020–present | Chief Secretary to the Mayor of Seoul (2014–2015); Chief Secretary to the Leader of the Democratic Party (2022–2024) |
| 2024 | Cheon Jun-ho | Democratic | 2020–present | Chief Secretary to the Mayor of Seoul (2014–2015); Chief Secretary to the Leader of the Democratic Party (2022–2024) |

== Election results ==
=== 2024 ===
Legislative Election 2024: Gangbuk A
| Party | Candidate | Votes | % | ±% |
|---|---|---|---|---|
| Democratic | Cheon Jun-ho | 47,701 | 57.23 | ▼0.52 |
| People Power | Jun Sang-bum | 35,639 | 42.76 | ▲3.27 |
| Rejected ballots | | 1,353 | – | |
| Turnout | | 84,693 | 64.03 | ▲2.25 |
| Registered electors | | 132,265 | | |
| Democratic hold | | Swing | | |

=== 2020 ===
Legislative Election 2020: Gangbuk A
| Party | Candidate | Votes | % | ±% |
|---|---|---|---|---|
| Democratic | Cheon Jun-ho | 49,490 | 57.75 | ▲23.07 |
| United Future | Cheong Yang-seog | 33,840 | 39.49 | ▼0.03 |
| Minjung | Kim Eun-jin | 1,457 | 1.70 | new |
| Independent | Seon Gye-seon | 903 | 1.05 | new |
| Rejected ballots | | 1,505 | – | |
| Turnout | | 87,195 | 61.78 | ▲7.01 |
| Registered electors | | 141,126 | | |
| Democratic gain from United Future | | Swing | | |

=== 2016 ===
Legislative Election 2016: Gangbuk A
| Party | Candidate | Votes | % | ±% |
|---|---|---|---|---|
| Saenuri | Cheong Yang-seog | 30,098 | 39.52 | ▼5.34 |
| Democratic | Cheon Jun-ho | 26,411 | 34.68 | ▼17.53 |
| People | Kim Gi-ok | 19,633 | 25.78 | new |
| Rejected ballots | | 1,030 | – | |
| Turnout | | 77,172 | 54.77 | ▲2.92 |
| Registered electors | | 140,892 | | |
| Saenuri gain from Democratic | | Swing | | |

=== 2012 ===
Legislative Election 2012: Gangbuk A
| Party | Candidate | Votes | % | ±% |
|---|---|---|---|---|
| Democratic United | Oh Yeong-sik | 37,352 | 52.21 | ▲7.6 |
| Saenuri | Cheong Yang-seog | 32,098 | 44.86 | ▼3.35 |
| New Progressive | Kim Il-woong | 2,086 | 2.91 | new |
| Rejected ballots | | 571 | – | |
| Turnout | | 72,107 | 51.37 | ▲9.27 |
| Registered electors | | 140,378 | | |
| Democratic United gain from Saenuri | | Swing | | |

=== 2008 ===
Legislative Election 2008: Gangbuk A
| Party | Candidate | Votes | % | ±% |
|---|---|---|---|---|
| Grand National | Cheong Yang-seog | 27,429 | 48.21 | ▲11.93 |
| United Democratic | Oh Yeong-sik | 25,378 | 44.61 | new |
| Creative Korea | Kim Seo-jin | 3,268 | 5.74 | new |
| Family Party for Peace and Unity | Kim Yong-ha | 810 | 1.42 | new |
| Rejected ballots | | 691 | – | |
| Turnout | | 57,576 | 42.10 | ▼16.20 |
| Registered electors | | 136,760 | | |
| Grand National gain from United Democratic | | Swing | | |

=== 2004 ===
Legislative Election 2004: Gangbuk A
| Party | Candidate | Votes | % | ±% |
|---|---|---|---|---|
| Uri | Oh Yeong-sik | 36,638 | 46.04 | new |
| Grand National | Kim Won-gil | 28,666 | 36.02 | ▲1.25 |
| Millennium Democratic | Park Kyeom-soo | 11,113 | 13.96 | ▼37.24 |
| United Liberal Democrats | Shin Oh-chul | 1,681 | 2.91 | ▼6.08 |
| Independent | Lee Young-soo | 1,470 | 1.84 | new |
| Rejected ballots | | 801 | – | |
| Turnout | | 80,369 | 58.30 | ▲8.35 |
| Registered electors | | 137,865 | | |
| Uri gain from Grand National | | Swing | | |

=== 2000 ===
Legislative Election 2000: Gangbuk A
| Party | Candidate | Votes | % | ±% |
|---|---|---|---|---|
| Millennium Democratic | Kim Won-gil | 34,629 | 51.20 | new |
| Grand National | Yoo Kwang-eon | 23,515 | 34.77 | new |
| United Liberal Democrats | Shin Oh-chul | 6,085 | 8.99 | ▼8.36 |
| Youth Progressive | Nam Kyo-yong | 3,396 | 5.02 | new |
| Rejected ballots | | 717 | – | |
| Turnout | | 67,625 | 49.95 | ▼7.18 |
| Registered electors | | 135,383 | | |
| Millennium Democratic hold | | Swing | | |

=== 1996 ===
Legislative Election 1996: Gangbuk A
| Party | Candidate | Votes | % | ±% |
|---|---|---|---|---|
| National Congress | Kim Won-gil | 31,171 | 40.13 | – |
| New Korea | Chung Tae-yun | 26,228 | 33.76 | – |
| United Liberal Democrats | Kim Kyu-won | 13,843 | 17.35 | – |
| Democratic | Jeon Dae-yeol | 6,786 | 8.73 | – |
| Rejected ballots | | 1,258 | – | |
| Turnout | | 78,926 | 57.13 | – |
| Registered electors | | 138,160 | | |
| National Congress win (new seat) | | | | |

== See also ==
- List of constituencies of the National Assembly of South Korea
