= Cho Jung-hun =

South Korean economist and politician

- 조정훈
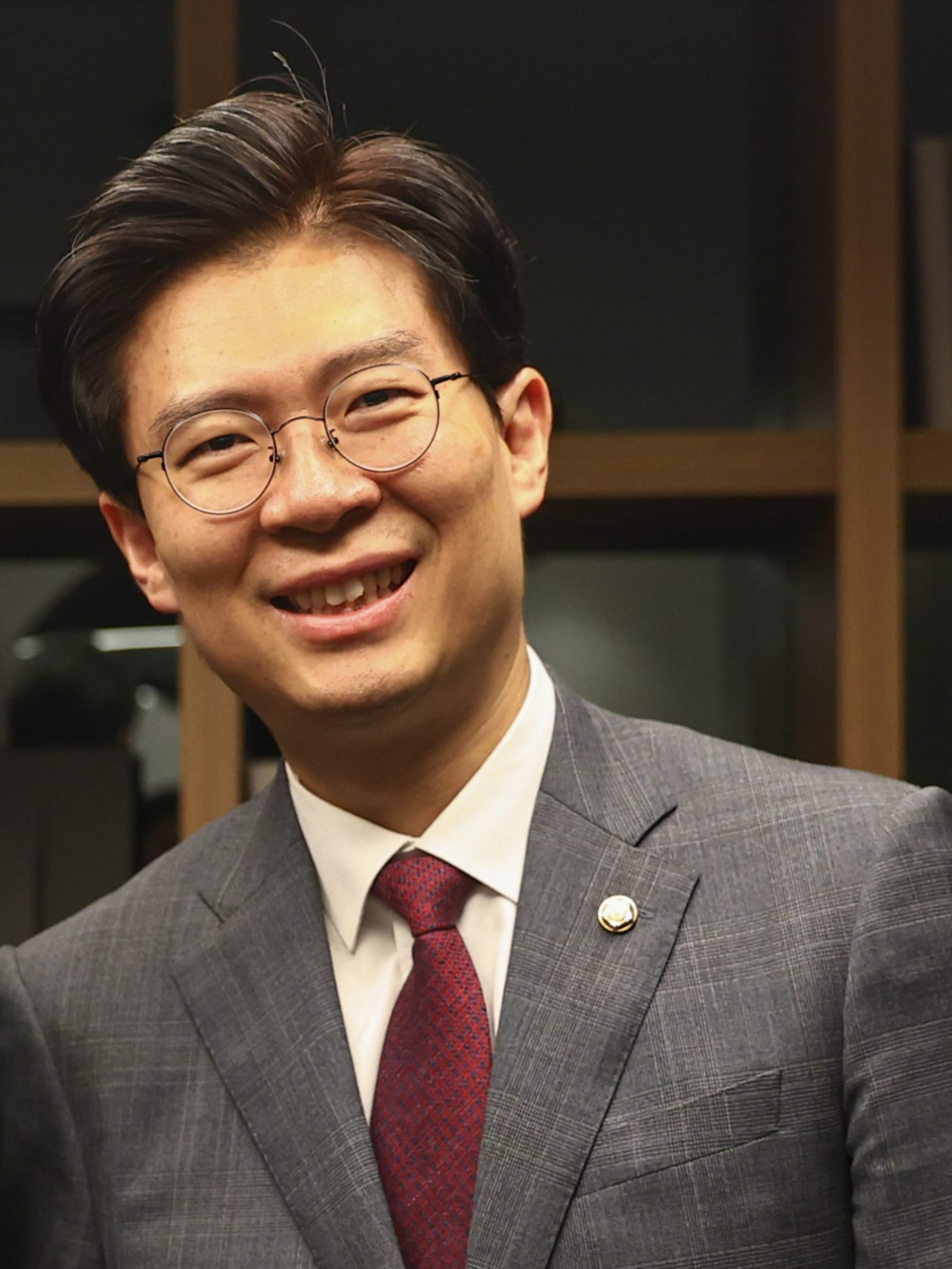
- Cho in 2023

Member of the National Assembly
- Incumbent
- Assumed office 30 May 2024
- Preceded by: Noh Woong-rae
- Constituency: Seoul Mapo A
- In office 30 May 2020 – 29 May 2024
- Constituency: Proportional

President of Transition Korea
- In office 12 May 2020 – 9 November 2023
- Succeeded by: Party merged with People Power
- In office 23 February 2020 – 23 March 2020; Serving with Lee Won-jae
- Preceded by: Position established
- Succeeded by: Hong Seok-bin (acting)

Personal details
- Born: 7 October 1972 (age 54) Seoul, South Korea
- Party: People Power
- Other political affiliations: Transition Korea (2020–2023); Democratic (2016–2020); Platform (2020)
- Education: Yonsei University; John F. Kennedy School of Government
- Occupation: Economist, politician

Cho Jung-hun (Korean: 조정훈, born 7 October 1972) is a South Korean economist and politician. He is one of the co-founders of the minor liberal Transition Korea party, along with Lee Won-jae. On 9 November 2023, he merged his minor party with the conservative People Power Party.

== Early life and education ==
Born in Seoul, Cho studied business administration at Yonsei University. After qualifying for Certified Public Accountant, he earned a master's degree in international development at John F. Kennedy School of Government. He passed the Young Professionals Programme of the World Bank.

== Career ==
From 2005 to 2008, Cho worked under the Technical Advisory Team of the World Bank where he worked as a part of negotiations for Kosovo independence and fiscal decentralization from Serbia. Then from 2012 to 2014, he worked at the World Bank Palestine branch and helped a negotiation between Palestine and Israel. Prior to entering politics, he worked at the World Bank Uzbekistan branch from 2014. In Uzbekistan, he was not only managing the development work of the bank, but was also consulting the economic development of the country. After returning to his home country South Korea, he served as the Vice Chairman for Future Consensus Institute and the director of Ajou Institute of Unification.

== Politics ==
Prior to the 2016 election, Cho was brought into the Democratic Party. He applied for the Democratic list but was not officially registered.

In 2020, Cho co-founded Transition Korea along with Lee Won-jae. He was elected to be the party president but resigned in order to run under the Platform Party (sister satellite party to the Democratic Party) banner. He ran 6th in the Platform Party list and was elected. On 12 May 2020, Cho officially left the Platform Party and returned to his original party.

On March 19, 2023, Cho received international attention for suggesting that Korea solve its population crisis by importing domestic workers from Southeast Asian nations and paying them half the legal minimum wage. Many domestic international commentators ridiculed Cho because his remarks landed on the International Day for the Elimination of Racial Discrimination and the annual protest day for the rights of migrant workers carried out by the South Korean Migrant Trade Union. Parliamentarian Yong Hye-in of the Basic Income Party criticized Cho's policy proposal as "racist".

In September 2023, Cho announced that he would join the People Power Party by merging his Transition Korea Party with the PPP. Two parties were formally merged on 9 November 2023.

== Political positions ==
He is politically syncretic, rejecting to be neither conservative nor liberal but being as pragmatic. He supports transition to negative regulation, as well as 300,000 won (~£200) of basic income.

He is also critical towards Anti-TADA, saying that "renovation is from the market but it should not be prevented at the beginning". He also added that should TADA gives negative influences to taxi drivers, the benefits earned must be shared with taxi drivers rather than simply prohibiting the platform.

He gained much support for his first interpellation session where he maintained a polite attitude asking unconventional questions. He pointed out the exacerbating economic disparity in Korean society and invited fellow politicians to take measures to alleviate polarization.

== Election results ==
Year	Elections	Constituency	Political party	Votes (%)	Remarks
2020	21st National Assembly General Election	PR (6th)	Platform Party (Note: Originally a member of Transition Korea but ran under the Platform Party banner. He officially left the party on 12 May 2020 to return to his original party.)	9,307,112 (33.35%)	Elected
2024	22nd National Assembly General Election	Mapo A (Seoul)	People Power	48,342 (48.30%)	Won
