= Ahn Dae-hee =

South Korean politician (born 1955)

- 안대희

Personal details
- Born: 31 March 1955 (age 71) Haman County, South Korea
- Party: People Power Party
- Education: Kyunggi High School

- Ahn Dae-hee
- Hangul: 안대희
- Hanja: 安大熙
- RR: An Daehui
- MR: An Taehŭi

Ahn Dae-hee (Korean: 안대희; born March 31, 1955) is a prosecutor once nominated Prime Minister of South Korea. President Park Geun-hye nominated for the post of Prime Minister on 22 May 2014, but Ahn withdrew his nomination.

== Biography ==
Ahn was a state prosecutor for 26 years until 2006. He was named Supreme Court justice by President Roh Moo-hyun in 2006. He joined the 2012 presidential campaign of Park Geun-hye. President Park has appointed Ahn on 22 May 2014 as Prime Minister and successor to his predecessor Jung Hong-won, but Ahn withdrew.

== Education ==
- Graduated, Kyunggi High School
- Bachelor of Arts in Public Administration, Seoul National University (Dropped-Out)

== Election results ==
Year	Elections	Constituency	Political party	Votes (%)	Results
2016	20th National Assembly General Election	Mapo A (Seoul)	Saenuri	28,429 (33.20%)	Defeated (2nd)
