= Jung Chung-rae =

South Korean politician (born 1965)

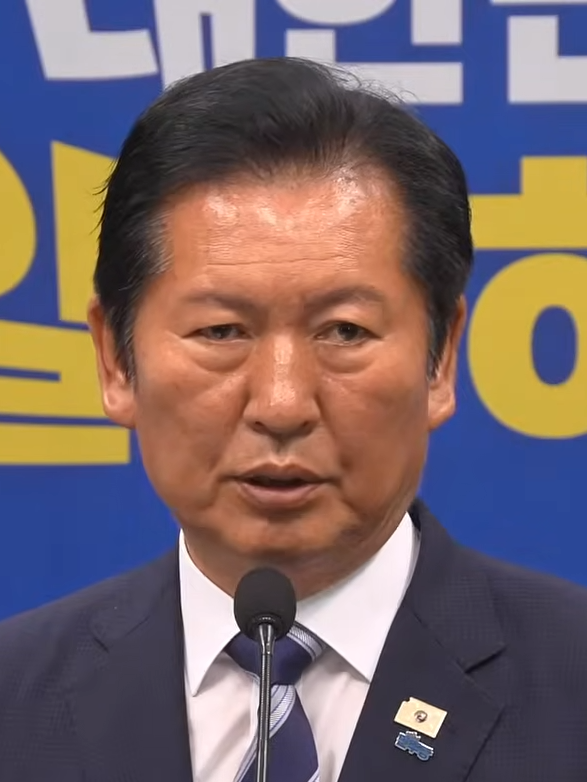
- Jung in 2026

Leader of the Democratic Party
- In office 2 August 2025 – 24 June 2026
- Preceded by: Lee Jae Myung; Park Chan-dae (acting); Kim Byung-kee (acting)
- Succeeded by: Han Byung-do (acting); Kim Min-seok

Member of the National Assembly
- Incumbent
- Assumed office 30 May 2020
- Constituency: Mapo B (Seoul)
- In office 30 May 2004 – 29 May 2008
- In office 30 May 2012 – 29 May 2016

Personal details
- Born: 18 May 1965 (age 61) Geumsan, South Chungcheong, South Korea
- Party: Democratic
- Education: Konkuk University; Sogang University
- Occupation: Politician

Korean name
- Hangul: 정청래
- RR: Jeong Cheongrae
- MR: Chŏng Ch'ŏngnae

Jung Chung-rae (Korean: 정청래; born 18 May 1965) is a South Korean politician who served as the leader of the Democratic Party from 2025 to 2026. He has been a member of the National Assembly from 2004 to 2008, from 2012 to 2016, and since 2020.

== Biography ==
Jung was born on 18 May 1965, the youngest of ten children in Seokmak-ri, Jinsan-myeon, Geumsan County, South Chungcheong Province, as a 17th-generation descendant of the Hadong Jung clan. He was educated in Bomoon High School.

While a fourth-year industrial engineering student at Konkuk University, Jung served as the eastern district chairman of the KPA's "Juche Special Committee" and photocopied and distributed six copies of the book "Tradition of the Juche Revolution," which contained information about Kim Il Sung's Juche ideas, to the cadres of Konkuk University's student government (in violation of the National Security Law).

On 23 September 1988, the Mapo Police Station in Seoul detained Jung on charges of violating the National Security Act and violating the Law on Assembly and Demonstration. In response to the government's 20 December 1988 amnesty reinstatement, the charges were dropped on 21 December 1988 by the Seoul District Public Prosecutor's Office.

However, in October 1989, he was arrested by the police for a terrorist act in which he broke into the U.S. embassy residence and detonated an improvised bomb. He was arrested and indicted in November 1989.

He was sentenced to 4 years in prison and 2 years of suspension of his license on charges of leading the occupation of the U.S. Embassy residence in Jeong-dong, Seoul in 1989 and throwing an improvised bomb, violating the Assembly and Demonstration Act and the Security Act, violating the National Security Act (miscellaneous), violating the Assembly and Demonstration Act, obstructing special official duties resulting in injury, preparing for arson of an existing building, violating the Act on the Punishment of Acts of Violence, etc., violating the Act on the Control of Firearms, Swords, Explosives, etc., and violating the Act on the Punishment of the Use of Molotov Cocktails, etc.

Due to his experience in anti-American protest movements, Jung was excluded from the State Department's October 2013 State of the Union inspection because he was not granted a visa to travel to the United States. Jung was also excluded from the State of the Union inspection.

== Political career ==
In the early 1990s, he founded and operated a guiding school in Mapo District, Seoul, and was recruited by the National Congress for New Politics, where he began his political activities.

In 2007, along with Lee Jae Myung, he led the establishment of People in Touch with Jung Dong-young, a support group for Jung, and served four terms (17th, 19th, 21st, and 22nd) as a member of the National Assembly, representing Mapo B, Seoul.

During the 17th National Assembly, he led an occupation of the National Assembly Building to demand the repeal of the National Security Act.

On 10 March 2016, he was not nominated by the Democratic Party of Korea for the 20th general election due to various controversies and was cut along with several other active members of the party. He said that he respected the party's decision and would not defect, but would help the party in various ways to win the general election. He recommended Son Hye-won, the party's public relations chairperson, for his district, and she was selected as the Democratic Party of Korea's candidate for the 20th general election in Mapo District.

In the 2020 legislative election, he was nominated as the Democratic Party of Korea's candidate for Mapo District and won a third term, defeating Kim Sung-dong of the People Power Party with 53.75% of the vote.

In August 2022, he was elected as a senior member of the Democratic Party of Korea.

In the 2024 South Korean legislative election, he ran for the same district and won a fourth term with 52.44% of the vote, defeating Ham Un-kyung of the People Power Party.

In the 22nd National Assembly, he was elected chairman of the Judiciary Committee for the first half of the term. He served as impeachment prosecutor in the Constitutional Court impeachment trial of President Yoon Suk Yeol.

On 2 August 2025, Jung was elected as chair of the Democratic Party of Korea during its national convention in Goyang, Gyeonggi Province. He defeated his rival Park Chan-dae with 61.74% of the vote. Within the party, while he is a part of pro-Lee Jae Myung faction, he takes a hardline stance against the People Power Party, emphasizing that the opposition party should apologize and reflect on "attempt to destroy the constitution during the 2024 South Korean martial law crisis and kill the people" before cooperation. Under his leadership, the DPK made gains in the 2026 local elections.

== Personal life ==
On 4 May 2018, at 8:45 p.m., Jung hit the front bumper of a parked car while reversing in the second-floor basement parking lot of a media building in Deunggye-ro, Jung District, Seoul, but fled without leaving any personal information. The car's front bumper and radiator grille were damaged in the accident. Jung was fined for fleeing the scene without leaving his contact information, even though he hit another car while parked.

== Election results ==
Year	Elections	Constituency	Political party	Votes (%)	Results
2004	17th National Assembly General Election	Mapo B (Seoul)	Uri	45,405 (44.77%)	Won
2008	18th National Assembly General Election	Mapo B (Seoul)	UDP	30,050 (37.88%)	Defeated (2nd)
2012	19th National Assembly General Election	Mapo B (Seoul)	DUP	58,163 (54.48%)	Won
2020	21st National Assembly General Election	Mapo B (Seoul)	Democratic	69,336 (53.75%)	Won
2024	22nd National Assembly General Election	Mapo B (Seoul)	Democratic	64,715 (52.44%)	Won

National Assembly of the Republic of Korea
Preceded by Park Ju-chun	Member of the National Assembly from Mapo B (Seoul); 30 May 2004–29 May 2008	Succeeded by Kang Yongseok
Preceded by Kang Yongseok	Member of the National Assembly from Mapo B (Seoul); 30 May 2012–29 May 2016	Succeeded by Sohn Hye-won
Preceded by Sohn Hye-won	Member of the National Assembly from Mapo B (Seoul); 30 May 2020–	Incumbent
Party political offices
Preceded by Lee Jae Myung; Park Chan-dae (Acting); Kim Byung-kee (Acting)	Leader of the Democratic Party; 2 August 2025–24 June 2026	Succeeded by Han Byung-do (Acting); Kim Min-seok
