= Park Ra-yeon =

South Korean poet (born 1951)

Park Ra Yeon (Korean: 박라연; born 1951) is a South Korean poet.

== Biography ==
Park Ra Yeon was born in Boseong, South Korea in 1951. She studied Korean literature at Korea National Open University and received her master's and doctoral degrees at the University of Suwon and Wonkwang University, respectively. She made her literary debut when her poem "Seoure saneun pyeongganggongju" (서울에 사는 평강공주 Princess Pyeonggang Living in Seoul) won the Dong-a Ilbo New Writer's Contest in 1990. Her first poetry collection of the same name, published in 1991, was received well by critics and readers for the compassion and subtlety in her writing.

Park went on to publish Seojeongui chu (서정의 추 The Pendulum of Lyricism) in 1993, Saengbam kkajuneun saram (생밤 까주는 사람 Someone Who Peels Raw Chestnuts For Me) in 1993, Chumchuneun namja siseuneun yeoja (춤추는 남자 시쓰는 여자 He Dances, She Writes Poetry) in 1995, Neoege sedeureo saneun dongan (너에게 세들어 사는 동안 While I Am Your Tenant) in 1996, Gongjungsogeui nae jeongwon (공중 속의 내 정원 My Garden in the Air) in 2000, Uju doragasyeotda (우주 돌아가셨다 The Universe Has Passed Away) in 2006, Bicheui saseoham (빛의 사서함 Postbox of Light) in 2009, and Norangnabiro beonjineun ohu (노랑나비로 번지는 오후 The Afternoon Seeping into a Yellow Butterfly) in 2012. She won the 3rd Yun Dongju Literature Award in 2008 and 5th Hyesan Park Dujin Literary Award in 2010.

== Writing ==
Recurring themes in Park Ra Yeon's poetry include poverty, loneliness, sadness, pain, and parting. The tone of her poems, however, remains bright, hopeful, and compassionate. Literary critic Oh Saeng-geun writes: "Her poetry is founded on a rich supply of tears and sadness, but far from being tragic or pathetic, it provides fertile ground for a beautiful and healthy vitality." In Park's poetry, pain always leads to hope, and her personas find new love in spite of their scars. Her poems do not exaggerate emotions or thoughts, using simple and natural language. They show a positive attitude toward life and the world based on the faith that there is a divine power. They also contain an almost maternal instinct to give back life to the injured and the dead. On her 2012 poetry collection Norangnabiro beonjineun ohu (노랑나비로 번지는 오후 The Afternoon Seeping into a Yellow Butterfly), poet Shin Kyeong-nim observes that "Park's work combines the familiar sensibilities of traditional Korean lyric poetry with the Modernist thirst for something new."

== Works ==
Poetry Collections

1. 『서울에 사는 평강공주』(문학과지성사, 1991)

Princess Pyeonggang Living in Seoul. Moonji, 1991.

2. 『서정의 추』(신생, 1993)

The Pendulum of Lyricism. Sinsaeng, 1993.

3. 『생밤 까주는 사람』(문학과지성사, 1993)

Someone Who Peels Raw Chestnuts For Me. Moonji, 1993.

4. 『춤추는 남자 시쓰는 여자』(고려원, 1995)

He Dances, She Writes Poetry. Goryeowon, 1995.

5. 『너에게 세들어 사는 동안』(문학과지성사, 1996)

While I Am Your Tenant. Moonji, 1996.

6. 『공중 속의 내 정원』(문학과지성사, 2000)

My Garden in the Air. Moonji, 2000.

7. 『우주 돌아가셨다』(랜덤하우스코리아, 2006)

The Universe Has Passed Away. Random House Korea, 2006.

8. 『빛의 사서함』(문학과지성사, 2009)

Postbox of Light. Moonji, 2009.

9. 『노랑나비로 번지는 오후』(서정시학, 2012)

The Afternoon Seeping into a Yellow Butterfly. Lyric Poetry and Poetics, 2012.

== Awards ==
1. 2008: 3rd Yun Dongju Literature Award

2. 2010: 5th Hyesan Park Dujin Literary Award
