= Han Byung-do =

South Korean politician (born 1967)

- 한병도
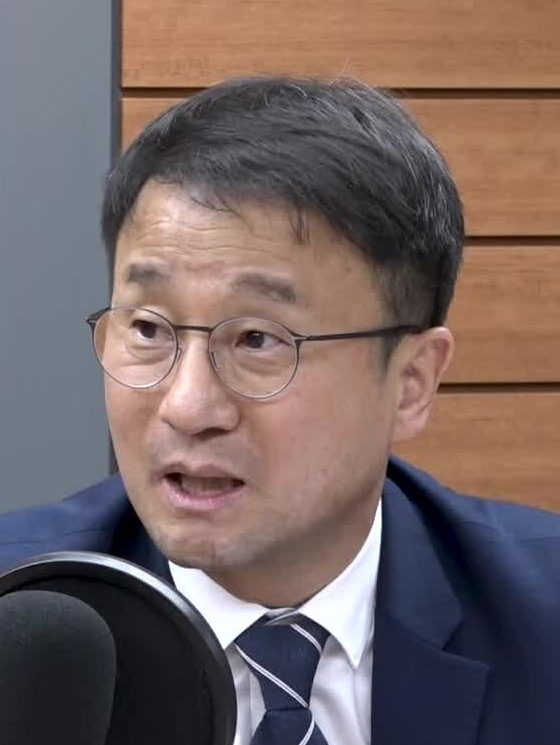
- Han in 2026

Acting Leader of the Democratic Party
- In office 24 June 2026 – 17 August 2026
- Preceded by: Jung Chung-rae
- Succeeded by: Kim Min-seok

Floor Leader of the Democratic Party
- Incumbent
- Assumed office 11 January 2026
- Preceded by: Kim Byung-kee; Moon Jin-seok (acting) himself Cheon Jun-ho (acting)
- Succeeded by: Cheon Jun-ho (acting) himself

Member of the National Assembly
- Incumbent
- Assumed office 30 May 2020
- Preceded by: Cho Bae-sook
- Constituency: Iksan B (North Jeolla)
- In office 30 May 2004 – 29 May 2008
- Preceded by: Lee Hyeop (Iksan, North Jeolla)
- Succeeded by: Lee Choon-suak
- Constituency: Iksan A (North Jeolla)

Senior Secretary to the President for Political Affairs
- In office 28 November 2017 – 8 January 2019
- President: Moon Jae-in
- Preceded by: Jun Byung-hun
- Succeeded by: Kang Gi-jung

Secretary to the President for Political Affairs
- In office 17 May 2017 – 27 November 2017
- President: Moon Jae-in
- Succeeded by: Song In-bae

Personal details
- Born: 7 December 1967 (age 58)
- Party: Democratic
- Education: Wonkwang University

Han Byung-do (Korean: 한병도; Hanja: 韓秉道; born 7 December 1967) is a South Korean politician who has served as the floor leader of the Democratic Party of Korea (DPK) since 2026. He briefly served as and acting leader of the DPK in 2026. He has represented Iksan in the National Assembly since 2020 and previously served as the Senior Secretary to the President Moon Jae-in for Political Affairs.

In 2004 Han was elected as member of the National Assembly from Iksan becoming the youngest member elected in this election at the age of 37. Han convinced President Roh Moo-hyun to accept the honorary doctorate degree in politics from Han's alma mater, Wonkwang University. This is the one of three degrees Roh has from tertiary education - all honorary as Roh never went to college - and the only one from Korean university. Han was previously the president of its student union.

In 2016 he lost his election to Cho Bae-sook. Upon beginning of the President Moon Jae-in's presidency, he was appointed as his secretary for political affairs. Later that year, Han was promoted to a senior secretary, a vice-ministerial position. Han resigned the post for the 2020 South Korean legislative election. In that election, he defeated Cho who served three times as his constituency's representative and previously defeated him four years ago.

Han holds a bachelor's degree in communications from Wonkwang University.

== Electoral history ==
Election	Year	District	Party affiliation	Votes	Percentage of votes	Results
17th National Assembly General Election	2004	North Jeolla Iksan A	Uri Party	47,527	74.53%	Won
20th National Assembly General Election	2016	North Jeolla Iksan B	Democratic Party of Korea	27,325	36.83%	Lost (2nd)
21st National Assembly General Election	2020	North Jeolla Iksan B	Democratic Party of Korea	56,982	72.59%	Won
22nd National Assembly General Election	2024	North Jeolla Iksan B	Democratic Party of Korea	65,027	87.03%	Won

National Assembly of the Republic of Korea
Preceded by Lee Hyeop (Iksan, North Jeolla)	Member of the National Assembly for Iksan A (North Jeolla); 30 May 2004–29 April 2008	Succeeded by Lee Choon-suak
Preceded by Cho Bae-sook	Member of the National Assembly for Iksan B (North Jeolla); 30 May 2020–	Incumbent
Party political offices
Preceded by Jung Chung-rae	Acting Leader of Democratic Party; 24 June 2026–17 August 2026	Succeeded by Kim Min-seok
Preceded by Kim Byung-kee; Moon Jin-seok (Acting)	Floor Leader of Democratic Party; 11 January 2026–21 April 2026	Succeeded by Cheon Jun-ho (Acting); Himself
Preceded by Himself; Cheon Jun-ho (Acting)	Floor Leader for Democratic Party; 6 May 2026–	Succeeded by Kim Byung-kee
Political offices
Preceded by Jun Byung-hun	Senior Secretary to the President for Political Affairs; 28 November 2017–8 January 2019	Succeeded by Kang Gi-jung
