= Noh Woong-rae =

South Korean politician

- 노웅래
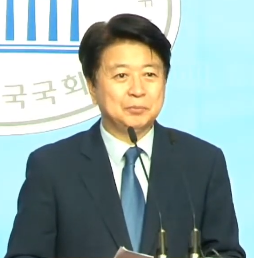

Member of the National Assembly
- In office 30 May 2012 – 29 May 2024
- Preceded by: Kang Seung-kyu
- Succeeded by: Cho Jung-hun
- Constituency: Mapo A (Seoul)
- In office 30 May 2004 – 29 May 2008
- Preceded by: Park Myung-hwan
- Succeeded by: Kang Seung-kyu
- Constituency: Mapo A (Seoul)

Personal details
- Born: 3 August 1957 (age 69) Singongdeok-dong, Mapo District, Seoul, South Korea
- Citizenship: South Korea
- Party: Democratic Party
- Other political affiliations: Democratic Party; Uri Party
- Education: Chung-ang University; Dongguk University
- Religion: Roman Catholic (Christian name: Laurence)

Military service
- Allegiance: South Korea
- Branch/service: Republic of Korea Army

Korean name
- Hangul: 노웅래
- Hanja: 盧雄來
- RR: No Ungrae
- MR: No Ungnae

Noh Woong-rae (Korean: 노웅래; born 3 August 1957) is a South Korean politician serving as a member of the National Assembly that represents the Mapo A constituency. He is a member of the liberal Democratic Party of Korea. Noh is part of the anti-Moon Jae-in faction within the Democratic Party of Korea.

== Early life and education ==
Noh Woong-rae was born in Singongdeok-dong, Mapo District, Seoul, South Korea on August 3, 1957. His father Noh Seung-hwan was a member of the National Assembly from 1971 to 1992 as the representative of the Mapo District constituency. He has one older brother and three younger brothers. He graduated from Chung-ang University and later graduated from Dongguk University. He worked as a reporter for the Maeil Business Newspaper from 1983 to 1985. He worked as a newsroom anchor for the Munhwa Broadcasting Corporation (MBC) from 1985 to 2003. He was a union organizer for workers at MBC and for reporters in South Korea from 2001 to 2003.

== Political career ==
In the 2004 South Korean legislative election, Noh ran for the Mapo A constituency as a member of the Uri Party and was elected with 44.21% of the vote. He also served as the spokesperson for the Uri Party from 2006 to 2007. He ran for the same constituency in the 2008 South Korean legislative election, however came in second place and lost to Grand National Party candidate Kang Seung-kyu. In the 2012 South Korean legislative election, he ran for the Mapo A constituency once again and won with 54.25% of the vote. From 2013, he served as the Chairman of the Seoul branch of the Democratic United Party. From March 2014 to June 2014, Noh served as the Secretary-General of the New Politics Alliance for Democracy. He was elected again for the Mapo A constituency in the 2016 South Korean legislative election and also ran as a candidate for the position of floor leader of the Democratic Party of Korea but failed to pass the first round. He once again attempted to become the floor leader of the Democratic Party, but lost to pro-Moon Jae-in candidate Hong Young-pyo. Most recently, Noh was elected once again for the same constituency during the 2020 South Korean legislative election.

== Election results ==
Year	Elections	Constituency	Political party	Votes (%)	Remarks
2004	17th National Assembly General Election	Mapo A (Seoul)	Uri Party	35,842 (44.21%)	Won
2008	18th National Assembly General Election	Mapo A (Seoul)	United Democratic Party	28,523 (45.38%)	Defeat
2012	19th National Assembly General Election	Mapo A (Seoul)	Democratic United Party	39,398 (54.25%)	Won
2016	20th National Assembly General Election	Mapo A (Seoul)	Democratic Party	44,451 (51.92%)	Won
2020	21st National Assembly General Election	Mapo A (Seoul)	Democratic Party	53,160 (55.99%)	Won
