= Lee–Chang scandal =

1982 financial scandal in South Korea

The Lee–Chang scandal (Korean: 이철희 장영자 어음 사기 사건) was a serious South Korean financial scandal that unfolded in 1982 under the presidency of Chun Doo-hwan. Jang Yeong-ja was a curb market operator who provided industrial firms with loans, demanding notes worth many times the loan's value in return, on condition that the notes would not be resold. In this way, beginning with $7 million saved from the alimonies of her two former husbands, Jang came to personally manipulate almost $1 billion through her underground loan network, or 17% of the entire South Korean money supply. The network was uncovered when one of the firms, whose notes Jang had resold at a discount, complained to the authorities.

The collapse of Jang's loan network caused the bankruptcy of two major industrial firms, the resignation and arrest of the directors of the Chohung and Sanop banks, and the suicide of a bank manager implicated in the scandal. The scandal spread as the involvement of diverse political figures came to light. Jang's husband, Lee Chol-hui, was a former deputy director of the KCIA and a classmate of Park Chung Hee. Furthermore, Jang's brother-in-law, Lee Gyu-gwang, was the uncle of President Chun himself, and was held to have played a key role in allowing the fraud to take place. Eleven members of the cabinet resigned and four more were replaced.
