= Minkahyup =

South Korean organization

In Korea the Minkahyup (MKY) (Translation: Association of Families of Democratic Movement) was an extension of the Thursday Prayer Meeting group which was launched in July 1974. Minkahyup was established in 1985 in South Korea by Mothers and wives of political prisoners. The organization allowed for mothers to openly meet and either seek advice or comfort. One of their many activities included rallying every Thursday to protest various injustices from the government or other power elite groups. The membership and activities of Minkahyup often overlapped with other organizations. This allowed for the number of members to always fluctuate.

Minkahyup was started so the mothers could work on the release of prisoners of conscience, political prisoners, and the abolition for torture. With the National Security Law that was enacted in 1964, political activists were being arrested and imprisoned with a long sentence or were even facing the death penalty. On July 29, 1999 in Seoul, South Korea, Minkahyup members protested for democratic reforms and the release of political prisoners. They claimed that there were still 297 political prisoners in the country.

On March 13, 1998, President Kim Dae Jung of South Korea approved amnesty to 5.5 million people. Only seventy four political prisoners were released when Minkahyup originally sent a list of 500 prisoners they thought should be pardoned. The protests were a testament to mothers who had persisted for so long. There were Minkahyup members who participated on a hunger strike in front of the National Assembly calling for the abolition of the National Security Law on December 20, 2004.

Minkahyup kept pressure on president Kim through protest trying to free Woo Yong Gak, a human rights activist who suffered solitary confinement, torture and deprivation. Woo was released on February 25, 1999 after spending forty-one years as a political prisoner. Through constant protest Minkahyup has been able to reduce sentences of political prisoners and bring awareness to the injustices occurring in Korea.

On October 16, 2014 Minkahyup celebrated their 1000th protest in Topgol Park. They protested against the National Security Law and for the release of political prisoners. Minkahyup members today are associated with other organizations and protests.
