= Paik Hak-soon =

South Korean policy adviser and academic

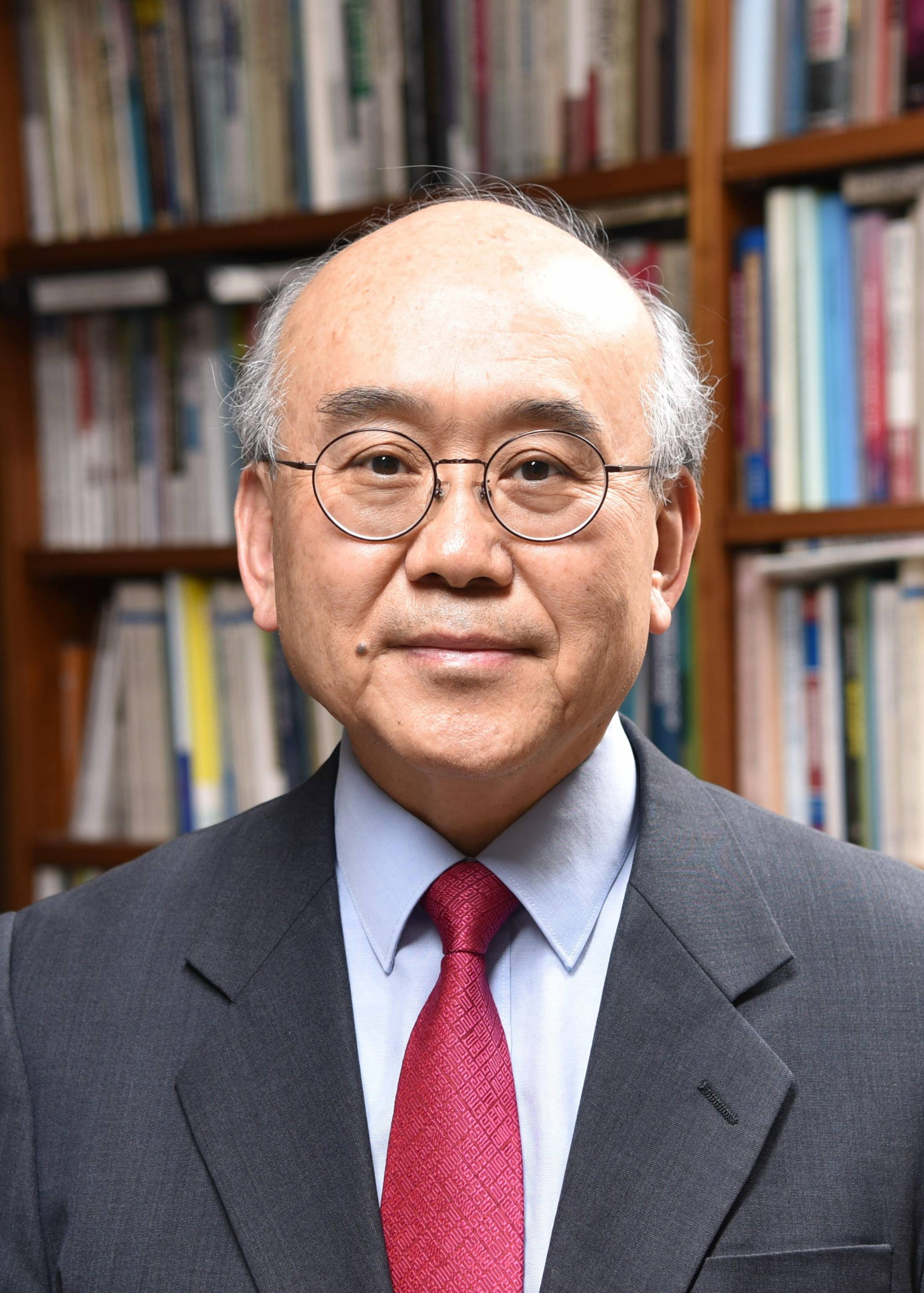

Korean name
- Hangul: 백학순
- Hanja: 白鶴淳
- RR: Baek Haksun
- MR: Paek Haksun

Paik Haksoon is the Founding President of the Academy of Kim Dae-jung Studies, established by the Kim Dae-jung Foundation in Seoul, Korea. Kim Dae-jung was the 15th President of the Republic of Korea (South Korea) and the Nobel Peace Prize laureate in 2000. In 2024, the International Political Science Association (IPSA) established the Kim Dae-jung Award, presenting its inaugural honor at the 2025 IPSA World Congress in Seoul. The award will be conferred biennially at subsequent IPSA World Congresses.

== Education ==
Paik earned his Ph.D. in Political Science from the University of Pennsylvania and was a post-doctoral fellow at the Korea Center, Harvard University.

== Selected works ==
Paik has written extensively on North Korean politics, inter-Korean relations, North Korea-U.S./U.S.-North Korea relations, North Korean nuclear and missile issues, and East Asian international relations. He is the author of 14 books and monographs, and co-author, editor, or co-editor of 9 books written in Korean or English. His works include: Kim Dae-jung's Thought and Politics (Co-Author, 2023), The Korean Peninsula Peace Strategy (Co-Author, 2022), Park Geun-hye Administration's Policy on North Korea and Unification: Comparison with Previous Administrations (2018), North Korean Politics in the Kim Jong Un Era, 2012-2014: Ideas, Identities, and Structures (2015), The U.S.-North Korea Relations during President Obama's Second Term, 2013-2014: Threat of the Use of Nuclear Weapons and the Collapse of Relationship (2014), and The History of Power in North Korea: Ideas, Identities, and Structures (2010).
