= Cheon Jun-ho =

South Korean politician

- 천준호
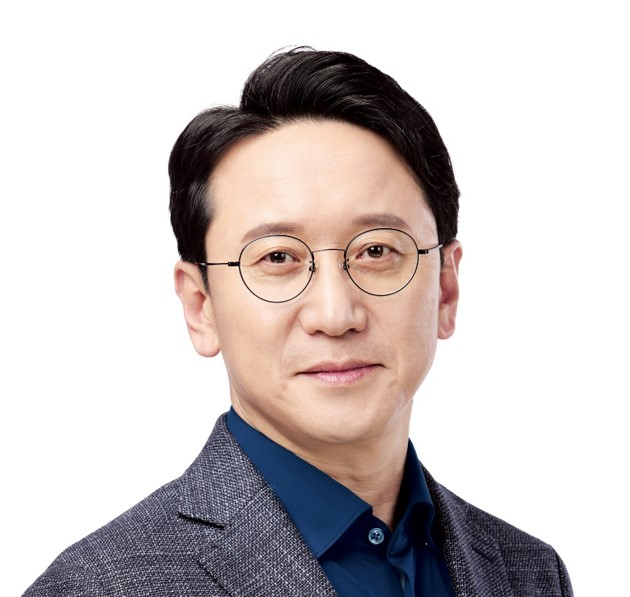

Member of the National Assembly
- Incumbent
- Assumed office 30 May 2020
- Preceded by: Cheong Yang-seog
- Constituency: Gangbuk A (Seoul)

Personal details
- Born: 15 February 1971 (age 55) Seoul, South Korea
- Citizenship: South Korea
- Party: Democratic Party of Korea
- Education: Kyung Hee University

Cheon Jun-ho (Korean: 천준호; born 15 February 1971) is a South Korean politician who is currently the representative of the Gangbuk A constituency in the National Assembly of South Korea. He is a member of the Democratic Party of Korea.

== Early life and education ==
Cheon was born in Seoul, South Korea on February 15, 1971. He graduated from Kyung Hee University with a degree in history.

== Political career ==
Cheon is known for work protecting cultural heritage sites and environmental preservation. In 2005, he served as the Co-Chairman of the Citizen's Union Against the Construction of Apartments at the palace Deoksugung and successfully stopped the construction of the apartment complex. He also served as the Executive Director of the Roh Moo-hyun and Kim Dae-Jung Citizen Remembrance Committee in 2009. He continued to work in both minor and major citizens' movements until 2010.

From 2011, he began working as the planning adviser and personal assistant to Mayor of Seoul, Park Won-soon. He joined the Democratic Party of Korea in February 2016 and was nominated as the party's candidate for the Gangbuk A constituency in the 2016 South Korean legislative election but lost to Cheong Yang-seog. He ran for the same constituency in the 2020 South Korean legislative election and defeated Cheong Yang-seog.

== Electoral history ==
Election	Year	Position	Party affiliation	Votes	Percentage of votes	Results
20th Legislative Election	2016	Member of the National Assembly (Gangbuk A, Seoul)	Democratic Party of Korea	26,411	34.68%	Lost (2nd)
21st Legislative Election	2020	Member of the National Assembly (Gangbuk A, Seoul)	Democratic Party of Korea	49,490	57.75%	Won
22nd Legislative Election	2024	Member of the National Assembly (Gangbuk A, Seoul)	Democratic Party of Korea	47,701	57.23%	Won

== See also ==
- Mayor of Seoul
- 2020 South Korean legislative election
