= Kim Byung-kee =

South Korean politician

- 김병기
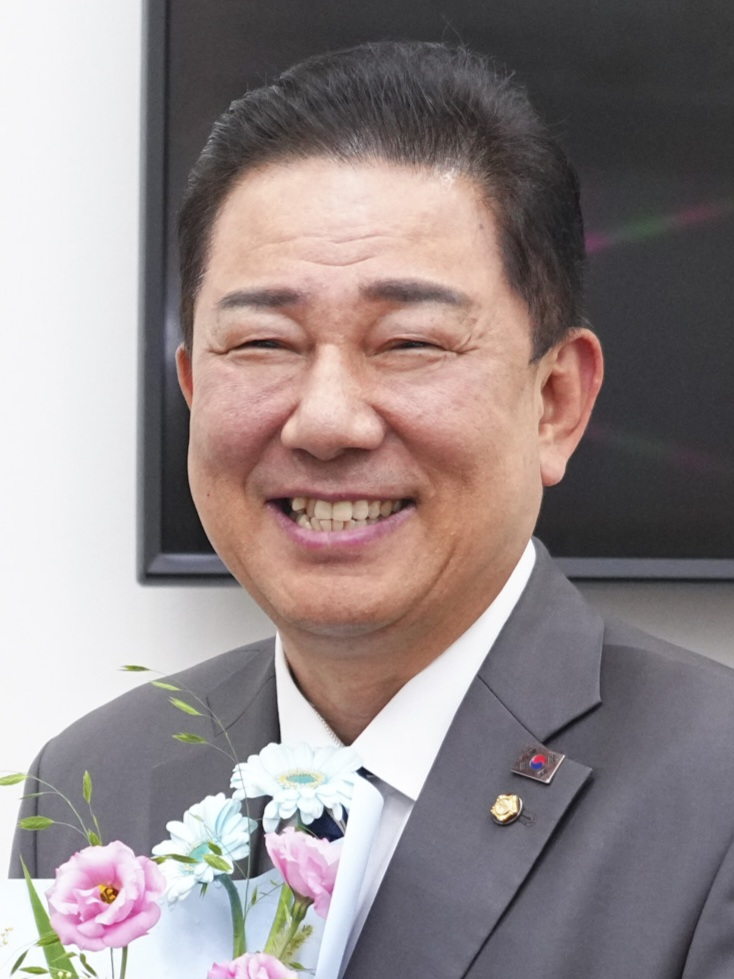
- Kim in 2025

Acting Leader of the Democratic Party
- In office 13 June 2025 – 2 August 2025
- Preceded by: Park Chan-dae (acting)
- Succeeded by: Jung Chung-rae

15th Floor Leader of the Democratic Party
- In office 13 June 2025 – 30 December 2025
- Preceded by: Park Chan-dae
- Succeeded by: Moon Jin-seok (acting); Han Byung-do

Member of the National Assembly
- Incumbent
- Assumed office 30 May 2016
- Preceded by: Jun Byung-hun
- Constituency: Seoul Dongjak A

Personal details
- Born: 10 July 1961 (age 65) Sacheon, South Korea
- Party: Independent
- Education: Kyung Hee University

Korean name
- Hangul: 김병기
- Hanja: 金炳基
- RR: Gim Byeonggi
- MR: Kim Pyŏnggi

Kim Byung-kee (Korean: 김병기; born 10 July 1961) is a South Korean member of National Assembly of the Democratic Party of Korea. He was the floor leader of the party from 13 June 2025 to 30 December 2025 and the member of the National Assembly from Dongjak A constituency since 30 May 2016. Previously, he was an acting party leader from 13 June to 2 August 2025, when he was succeeded by Jung Chung-rae.

== Election results ==
Year	Elections	Constituency	Political party	Votes (%)	Results
2016	20th National Assembly General Election	Dongjak A (Seoul)	Democratic	40,046 (36.53%)	Won
2020	21st National Assembly General Election	Dongjak A (Seoul)	Democratic	70,290 (55.29%)	Won
2024	22nd National Assembly General Election	Dongjak A (Seoul)	Democratic	63,372 (50.49%)	Won

National Assembly of the Republic of Korea
Preceded by Jun Byung-hun	Member of the National Assembly for Dongjak A (Seoul); 30 May 2016–	Incumbent
Party political offices
Preceded by Park Chan-dae (Acting)	Acting Leader of Democratic Party; 13 June 2025–2 August 2025	Succeeded by Jung Chung-rae
Preceded by Park Chan-dae	Floor Leader for Democratic Party; 13 June 2025–30 December 2025	Succeeded by Moon Jin-seok (Acting); Han Byung-do
