= Singongdeok-dong =

- Country: South Korea

Area
  - Total: 0.26 km^{2} (0.10 sq mi)

Population (2001)
  - Total: 10,570
  - Density: 41,000/km^{2} (110,000/sq mi)

Korean name
- Hangul: 신공덕동
- Hanja: 新孔德洞
- RR: Singongdeok-dong
- MR: Sin'gongdŏk-tong

Singongdeok-dong (Korean: 신공덕동) is a dong (neighbourhood) of Mapo District, Seoul, South Korea.

== See also ==
- Administrative divisions of South Korea
