= Park Chan-dae (politician) =

South Korean politician (born 1967)

- 박찬대
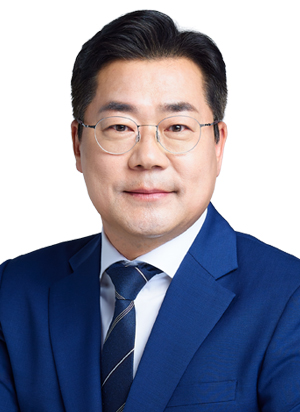
- Park in 2026

Mayor of Incheon
- Incumbent
- Assumed office 1 July 2026
- Preceded by: Yoo Jeong-bok

Acting Leader of the Democratic Party
- In office 9 April 2025 – 13 June 2025
- Preceded by: Lee Jae Myung
- Succeeded by: Kim Byung-kee (acting)
- In office 24 June 2024 – 18 August 2024
- Preceded by: Lee Jae Myung
- Succeeded by: Lee Jae Myung

14th Floor Leader of the Democratic Party
- In office 3 May 2024 – 13 June 2025
- Preceded by: Hong Ihk-pyo
- Succeeded by: Kim Byung-kee

Member of the National Assembly
- In office 30 May 2016 – 29 April 2026
- Preceded by: Hwang Woo-yea (Yeonsu, Incheon)
- Succeeded by: Song Young-gil
- Constituency: Yeonsu A (Incheon)

Personal details
- Born: 10 May 1967 (age 59) Michuhol, Incheon, South Korea
- Party: Democratic (2014–present)
- Other political affiliations: UDP (2009–2011); DUP (2011–2014)
- Children: 1
- Education: Inha University; Seoul National University
- Occupation: Accountant, politician

Military service
- Allegiance: South Korea
- Branch/service: Republic of Korea Armed Forces
- Years of service: 1988–1990
- Rank: Sergeant
- Unit: 31st Infantry Division

Korean name
- Hangul: 박찬대
- RR: Bak Chandae
- MR: Pak Ch'andae

Park Chan-dae (Korean: 박찬대; born 10 May 1967) is a South Korean accountant and politician who has served as the Mayor of Incheon since 2026. Prior to this, he served as a member of the National Assembly from 30 May 2016 to 29 April 2026, and following the resignation of Lee Jae Myung on 9 April 2025 to run in the 2025 South Korean presidential election, Park served as the leader of Democratic Party of Korea from April to June 2025. He also served as the floor leader of the Democratic Party of Korea from 2024 to 2025.

== Biography ==
=== Early life and education ===
Born on 10 May 1967 in Yonghyeon-dong, Incheon (then part of Gyeonggi Province), he is the youngest between three sons and one daughter. His family were from Andong, North Gyeongsang Province and moved to Incheon just before he was born. During his childhood, he attended and graduated from Incheon YongHyeon Elementary School, Incheon Daegeon Middle School, and Dong Incheon High School.

After his graduation from high schools, in 1984, he entered Bachelor of Business Administration, College of Business Administration, Inha University. During his tenure as university student, he played important role for student movement during military role of Chun Doo-hwan, particularly as a participant of June Democratic Struggle. After graduated from Inha University, he served at the Republic of Korea Armed Forces in 1988 as administrative officer of 31st Infantry Division unit, and was discharged on 27 December 1990. After discharged from military, he entered Graduate School of Public Administration (GSPA) at Seoul National University and got a Master's degree in 1998.

From 1997 to 1999, he worked in the International Department of Sedong Accounting Corporation, and from 1999 to 2000, he worked in the International Department of Samil Accounting Corporation. From 2001 to 2003, he worked in the Accounting Supervision Bureau and the Information Disclosure Supervision Bureau of the Financial Supervisory Service. From 2003 until December 2015, he was the head of the Gyeongin Branch of Hanmi Accounting Corporation, and also the vice president of the company.

=== Political career ===
In 2009, Park joined the Democratic Party due to death of former President Roh Moo-hyun. In 2012, he attempted to run for the 2012 South Korean legislative election from United Democratic Party for Nam B, but was unsuccessful due to his nomination for the district was transferred to Ahn Gwi-ok because of the principle of preferential nomination for women. Nevertheless, he followed the party's policy for the time being and served as the Incheon City Party spokesperson in the 2012 legislative election.

During the New Politics Alliance for Democracy era, he was active in the party's in-house study group Dolbanae (Looking Back, Looking Ahead, and Looking Forward), which was formed at the same time as NPAD founding in March 2014. In December 2015, he was the head of the Incheon regional branch of the Democratic Party and became an adjunct professor at the Department of Business Administration at Inha University.

He was campaigned for the 2016 legislative election and entered the National Assembly for the first time after he won by a margin of 0.29% against Saenuri Party's challenger Jeong Seung-yeon for Yeonsu A District. In 2017, he was deputy head of the campaign for presidential candidate Moon Jae-in, who won the election. From May 2019 to May 2020, he was the press secretary of the Democratic Party. In September 2019, he joined the Special Committee on Prosecutor's Office Reform of the Democratic Party.

In the 2026 South Korean local elections, Park was elected as the mayor of Incheon, defeating People Power Party nominee and incumbent mayor Yoo Jeong-bok by nearly ten percentage points. After his victory, Park emphasized the immediate launch of a 100-day emergency project for economic recovery.

== Electoral results ==
=== General elections ===
year	Election	Constituency	Political party	Votes (%)	Remarks
2016	20th National Assembly General Election	Incheon Yeonsu A	Democratic	30,047 (40.57%)	Won
2020	21st National Assembly General Election	Incheon Yeonsu A	Democratic	45,479 (56.87%)	Won
2024	22nd National Assembly General Election	Incheon Yeonsu A	Democratic	58,663 (52.44%)	Won

=== Local elections ===
==== Mayor of Incheon ====
Year	Election	Constituency	Political party	Votes (%)	Remarks
2026	9th Iocal Election	Incheon (Mayoral Elections)	Democratic	809,426 (52.84%)	Won

National Assembly of the Republic of Korea
Preceded by Hwang Woo-yea (Yeonsu, Incheon)	Member of the National Assembly for Yeonsu A (Incheon); 30 May 2016–29 April 2026	Succeeded by Song Young-gil
Party political offices
Preceded by Lee Jae Myung	Acting Leader of Democratic Party; 24 June 2024–18 August 2024	Succeeded by Lee Jae Myung
Preceded by Lee Jae Myung	Acting Leader of Democratic Party; 9 April 2025–13 June 2025	Succeeded by Kim Byung-kee (Acting)
Preceded by Hong Ihk-pyo	Floor Leader for Democratic Party; 3 May 2024–13 June 2025	Succeeded by Kim Byung-kee
Political offices
Preceded by Yoo Jeong-bok	Mayor of Incheon; 1 July 2026–	Incumbent
