= Cabinet of Lee Jae Myung =

Government of South Korea since 2025

- State Council of South Korea
- 2025–present
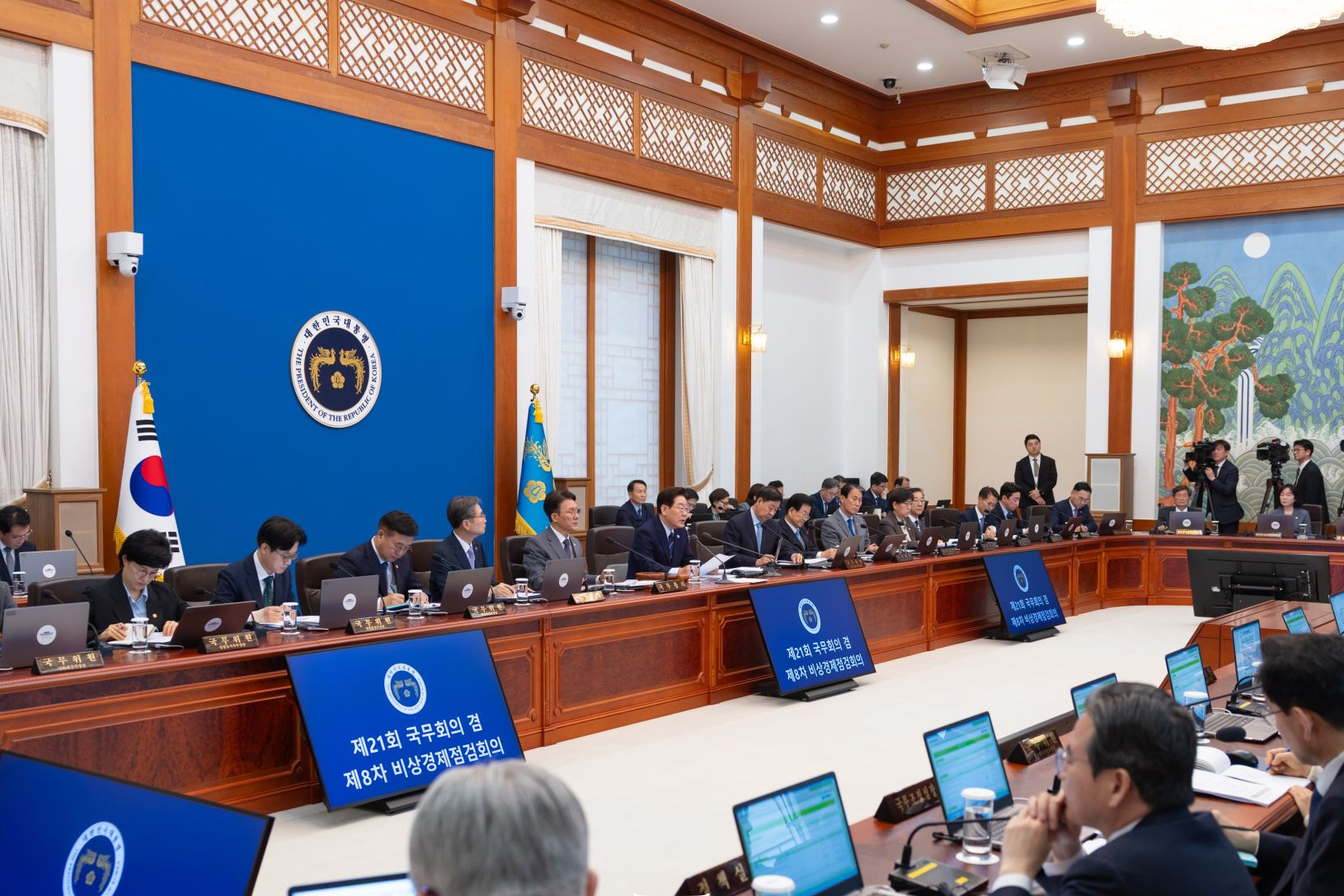
- The cabinet of President Lee in a meeting in May 2026
- Date formed: 4 June 2025

People and organisations
- President: Lee Jae Myung
- Prime Minister: Lee Ju-ho (acting); Kim Min-seok; Han Seong-sook
- Deputy Prime Minister: Koo Yun-cheol; Choi Kyo-jin; Bae Kyung-hoon; Lee Hyoung-il
- Member party: Democratic Party
- Status in legislature: Majority government
- Opposition parties: People Power Party; Rebuilding Korea; Progressive; Reform; Basic Income; Social Democratic; Independent
- Opposition leader: Jang Dong-hyeok

History
- Elections: 2025 presidential election; 2028 legislative election
- Predecessor: Cabinet of Yoon Suk Yeol

Lee Jae Myung assumed office as the 14th president of South Korea on 4 June 2025 and formed a cabinet after winning the 2025 presidential election.

== Nomination ==
He nominated Kim Min-seok as Prime Minister, while former Unification Minister Lee Jong-seok, former Deputy National Security Adviser Kim Hyun-jong, and diplomat-turned-politician Wi Sung-lac were reportedly among his potential picks for positions in national security and foreign affairs posts. Lee also nominated Rep. Kang Hoon-sik, a former DPK spokesman, as his first chief of staff, Lee Jong-seok for the director of the National Intelligence Service, Hwang In-kwon, a retired four-star Army general, as the chief of the Presidential Security Service, Wi Sung-lac as director of the National Security Council (NSC), and Rep. Kang Yu-jung, who was a spokeswoman for Lee's 2025 presidential campaign team, as his presidential spokesperson.

Seeking to ensure continuity in state affairs, Lee turned down the resignation offers of holdover members of the previous cabinet, with the exception of Justice Minister Park Sung-jae. He met with Yoon's holdover cabinet on 5 June, including Acting Prime Minister Lee Ju-ho.

By 23 June 2025, Lee had nominated numerous more ministers. On 23 June alone, he would nominate 10 ministers to his cabinet, including his defense, foreign affairs and unification ministers. His defense minister nominee Ahn Gyu-back will be the first civilian defense minister since 1961 upon confirmation. His unification minister nominee Chung Dong-young is known for his close engagement with North Korea during his previous tenure as the unification minister under the President Roh Moo-hyun.

On 24 June 2025, Kim Min-Seok's two parliamentary day confirmation hearing began. The second and final confirmation hearing for Kim at the National Assembly was held on 25 June 2025. Kim Min-Seok underwent a two-day confirmation hearing process for his nomination as prime minister at the National Assembly on 24 and 25 June 2025. As of 30 June 2025, the motion to approve Kim's prime minister nomination was scheduled for no later than 3 July 2025. That same day, Lee named six new cabinet ministers, including two deputy prime ministers, and his longtime aide Jeong Seong-ho as South Korea's new Minister of Justice.

As of 30 June 2025, Lee had nominated 17 of 19 cabinet ministers. On 30 June 2025, South Korea National Assembly Speaker Woo Won-shik stated that the motion to approve Kim's prime minister nomination would be voted on no later than 3 July 2025. The same day, Lee Jae-myung nominated six new cabinet ministers including two deputy prime ministers and tapping his longtime aide Jeong Seong-ho as the new Justice Minister and former President of Chungnam National University Lee Jin-sook, which shares similar name with the chairwoman of Korea Communications Commission Lee Jin-sook, as the new Education Minister.

On 3 July 2025, the South Korean National Assembly voted to approve the nomination of Kim Min-seok as Prime Minister in a 173–3 vote. Kim would then be sworn in as Prime Minister on 7 July 2025. The post of prime minister is the only cabinet level position which requires National Assembly approval in South Korea. As of 30 June 2025, Lee has nominated 17 of 19 cabinet ministers. On 11 July 2025, the last two remaining cabinet ministers were named, thus finalizing the lineup for Lee Jae Myung's 19-member cabinet. The cabinet now awaits official presidential confirmation. On 13 July 2025, Lee appointed 12 vice ministers. One notable appointment was Hong So-young, who would become the first woman to serve as commissioner of the Military Manpower Administration since the administration was founded in 1970.

Lee has opted for his cabinet minister nominees to face scrutiny hearings in the National Assembly prior to their confirmation, and the first hearings for Lee's cabinet nominees began on 14 July 2025. Education Minister nominee Lee Jin-sook, Gender Equality Minister nominee Rep. Kang Sun-woo, Minister of Science, ICT nominee Bae Kyung-hoon and Minister of Oceans and Fisheries Chun Jae-soo would be among those who their confirmation hearings held on 14 July. Defense Minister nominee Ahn Gyu-back would have his scrutiny hearing on 15 July. The same day, Kwon Oh-eul, nominee for Minister of Patriots and Veterans Affairs, and Han Seong-sook, nominee for Minister of SMEs and Startups, would have their scrutiny hearings as well.

On 20 July, Lee withdrew the nomination of Lee Jin-sook as Minister of Education. On 23 July, Kang Sun-woo resigned as the nominee of the Minister of Gender Equality and Family.

On 30 September, Lee approved an amendment to the Government Organization Act, which was passed from the National Assembly.

On 30 August, Lee reshuffled his cabinet by replacing six ministers.He nominated Lee Hyoung-il as deputy prime minister for economic affairs and minister of finance and economy, Kang Shin-chul as defence minister, Kim Seung-won as justice minister, Hong Jee-sun as minister of land, infrastructure and transport, Lee So-young as minister of small and medium-sized enterprises (SMEs) and start-ups, Yong Hye-in of the minor progressive Basic Income Party as minister of gender equality and family. Lee also appointed Lee Hae-min of the Rebuilding Korea Party as senior presidential secretary for AI and future planning. Following this appointment Lee Hae-min became an independent as South Korean law prohibits political appointees in the Presidential Secretariat from holding a political party affiliation.

On 13 September, Yong Hye-in withdrew her nomination as minister of gender equality and family over backlash from her refusal to resign her parliamentary seat and public opposition to her record on gender policy.

== Elected official ==
=== President ===
Lee Jae Myung defeated the People Power Party nomineee, Kim Moon-soo, in the 2025 presidential election. He assumed office on 4 June 2025.

President of South Korea
Portrait	Name	Date of birth	Party	Background	Ref.
	Lee Jae Myung	c. 8 December 1963 (age 62)	Democratic	Leader of the Democratic Party (2022–2025); Member of the National Assembly for Gyeyang B (2022–2025); Governor of Gyeonggi Province (2018–2021); Mayor of Seongnam (2010–2018); Human rights and labor lawyer	

== State Council ==
=== Cabinet ===
Cabinet of President Lee Jae Myung
Office	Portrait	Name	Party	Ref.
Prime Minister; Announced 7 June 2026; Assumed office 1 July 2026		Han Seong-sook	Independent	
Deputy Prime Minister and Minister of Economy and Finance; Announced 30 August 2026; Assumed office 22 September 2026		Lee Hyoung-il	Independent	
Deputy Prime Minister and Minister of Science and ICT; Announced 23 June 2025; Assumed office 16 July 2025		Bae Kyung-hoon	Independent	
Minister of Education		Vacant		
Minister of Foreign Affairs; Announced 23 June 2025; Assumed office 19 July 2025		Cho Hyun	Democratic	
Minister of Unification; Announced 23 June 2025; Assumed office 25 July 2025		Chung Dong-young	Democratic	
Minister of Justice		Vacant		
Minister of National Defense; Announced 30 August 2026; Assumed office 22 September 2026		Kang Shin-chul	Independent	
Minister of the Interior and Safety; Announced 29 June 2025; Assumed office 19 July 2025		Yun Ho-jung	Democratic	
Minister of Patriots and Veterans Affairs; Announced 23 June 2025; Assumed office 25 July 2025		Kwon Oh-eul	Democratic	
Minister of Culture, Sports and Tourism; Announced 11 July 2025; Assumed office 31 July 2025		Chae Hwi-young	Independent	
Minister of Agriculture, Food and Rural Affairs; Assumed office 23 December 2023; Holdover from Yoon cabinet Announced 23 June 2025		Song Mi-ryung	Independent	
Minister of Trade, Industry and Resources; Announced 29 June 2025; Assumed office 19 July 2025		Kim Jung-kwan	Independent	
Minister of Health and Welfare; Announced 29 June 2025; Assumed office 21 July 2025		Jeong Eun-kyeong	Independent	
Minister of Climate, Energy and Environment; Announced 23 June 2025; Assumed office 21 July 2025		Kim Sung-whan	Democratic	
Minister of Employment and Labor; Announced 23 June 2025; Assumed office 21 July 2025		Kim Young-hoon	Democratic	
Minister of Gender Equality and Family; Announced 13 August 2025; Assumed office 10 September 2025		Won Min-kyong	Independent	
Minister of Land, Infrastructure and Transport; Announced 30 August 2026; Assumed office 22 September 2026		Hong Jee-sun	Independent	
Minister of Oceans and Fisheries; Announced 2 March 2026; Assumed office 25 March 2026		Hwang Jong-woo	Independent	
Minister of SMEs and Startups; Announced 30 August 2026; Assumed office 23 September 2026		Lee So-young	Democratic	
Minister of Planning and Budget; Announced 2 March 2026; Assumed office 25 March 2026		Park Hong-keun	Democratic	
Other non-member attendees
Chief of Staff to the President; Assumed office 15 October 2026		Lim Gwang-hyeon	Independent	
Director of National Security Office; Assumed office 4 June 2025		Wi Sung-lac	Democratic	
Chief Presidential Secretary for Policy; Assumed office 1 October 2026		Ha Joon-kyung	Independent	
Minister of Government Policy Coordination; Assumed office 10 July 2026		Lim Ki-keun	Independent	
Minister of Personnel Management; Assumed office 20 July 2025		Choi Dong-seok	Independent	
Minister of Government Legislation; Assumed office 13 July 2025		Jo Won-cheol	Independent	
Minister of Food and Drug Safety; Assumed office 27 May 2022; Holdover from Yoon cabinet		Oh Yoo-kyung	Independent	
Chairperson of the Fair Trade Commission; Announced 13 August 2025; Assumed office 12 September 2025		Ju Biung-ghi	Independent	
Chairperson of the Financial Services Commission; Announced 13 August 2025; Assumed office 12 September 2025		Lee Eog-weon	Independent	
Director General of Free Trade Negotiations; Ministry of Trade, Industry and Resources; Assumed office 21 August 2026		Park Jung-sung	Independent	
Mayor of Seoul; Assumed office 8 April 2021; Holdover from Yoon cabinet		Oh Se-hoon	People Power	
Mayor of Jeonnam–Gwangju; Assumed office 1 July 2026		Min Hyung-bae	Democratic	

=== Former cabinet ministers ===
Office	Portrait	Name	Party	Ref.
Prime Minister; Announced 4 June 2025; Assumed office 4 July 2025; Ended 30 June 2026		Kim Min-seok	Democratic	
Deputy Prime Minister and Minister of Economy and Finance; Announced 29 June 2025; Assumed office 19 July 2025; Ended 21 September 2026		Koo Yun-cheol	Independent	
Minister of National Defense; Announced 23 June 2025; Assumed office 25 July 2025; Ended 21 September 2026		Ahn Gyu-back	Democratic	
Minister of Justice; Announced 29 June 2025; Assumed office 19 July 2025; Resigned 24 August 2026		Jeong Seong-ho	Democratic	
Minister of Land, Infrastructure and Transport; Announced 11 July 2025; Assumed office 31 July 2025; Ended 21 September 2026		Kim Yoon-deok	Democratic	
Minister of Oceans and Fisheries; Announced 23 June 2025; Assumed office 23 July 2025; Resigned 11 December 2025		Chun Jae-soo	Democratic	
Minister of SMEs and Startups; Announced 23 June 2025; Assumed office 24 July 2025; Ended 30 June 2026		Han Seong-sook	Independent	
Minister of Education; Announced 13 August 2025; Assumed office 11 September 2025; Ended 22 November 2026		Choi Kyo-jin	Independent	
Other non-member attendees
Chief of Staff to the President; Assumed office 4 June 2025; Ended 14 October 2026		Kang Hoon-sik	Democratic	
Chief Presidential Secretary for Policy; Assumed office 6 June 2025; Resigned 1 September 2026		Kim Yong-beom	Independent	
Minister of Government Policy Coordination; Assumed office 23 June 2025; Ended 10 July 2026		Yoon Chang-ryul	Independent	
Director General of Free Trade Negotiations; Ministry of Trade, Industry and Resources; Assumed office 11 June 2025; Ended 14 August 2026		Yeo Han-koo	Independent	
