= State Council (South Korea) =

Executive authority in South Korea

State Council of Republic of Korea
- 국무회의
- Emblem of the Government of South Korea

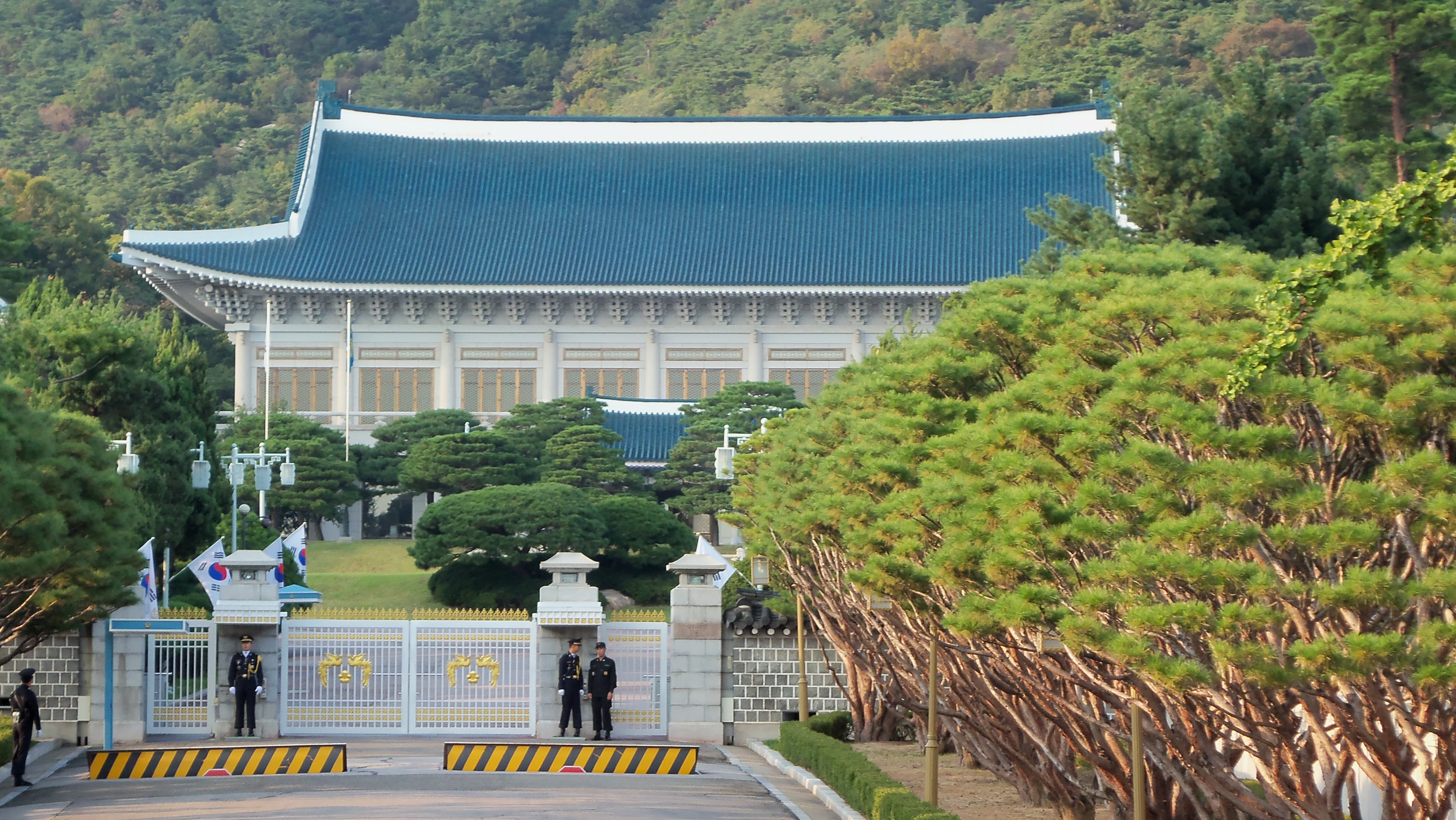
- Main hall of the Blue House

Agency overview
- Formed: 15 August 1948; 78 years ago
- Type: Highest executive body of the unitary presidential constitutional republic government
- Jurisdiction: Government of South Korea
- Headquarters: Seoul
- Motto: Hongik Ingan (To broadly benefit the human world)
- Agency executives: Lee Jae-myung, President; Han Seong-sook, Prime Minister; Lee Hyoung-il, Deputy Prime Minister; Bae Kyung-hoon, Deputy Prime Minister
- Website: Official website

Korean name
- Hangul: 국무회의
- Hanja: 國務會議
- RR: Gungmuhoeui
- MR: Kungmuhoeŭi

The State Council (Korean: 국무회의) is the chief executive body and national cabinet of South Korea involved in discussing "important policies that fall within the power of the Executive" as specified by the Constitution. The most influential part of the executive branch of the government of South Korea are the ministries.

== Roles ==
The State Council is the highest body for policy deliberation and resolution in the executive branch of South Korea. Article 89 of the South Korean constitution specifies what "important policies that fall within the power of the Executive" the State Council has to deliver:

# Basic plans for state affairs, and general policies of the Executive;

1. Declaration of war, conclusion of peace and other important matters pertaining to foreign policy;
2. Draft amendments to the Constitution, proposals for national referenda, proposed treaties, legislative bills, and proposed presidential decrees;
3. Budgets, settlement of accounts, basic plans for disposal of state properties, contracts incurring financial burden on the State, and other important financial matters;
4. Emergency orders and emergency financial and economic actions or orders by the President, and declaration and termination of martial law;
5. Important military affairs;
6. Requests for convening an extraordinary session of the National Assembly;
7. Awarding of honors;
8. Granting of amnesty, commutation and restoration of rights;
9. Demarcation of jurisdiction among the Ministries of the Executive;
10. Basic plans concerning delegation or allocation of powers within the Executive;
11. Evaluation and analysis of the administration of state affairs;
12. Formulation and coordination of important policies of each Executive Ministry;
13. Action for the dissolution of a political party;
14. Examination of petitions pertaining to executive policies submitted or referred to the Executive;
15. Appointment of the Prosecutor General, the Chairman of the Joint Chiefs of Staff, the Chief of Staff of each armed service, the presidents of national universities, ambassadors, and such other public officials and managers of important state-run enterprises as designated by Act; and
16. Other matters presented by the President, the Prime Minister or a member of the State Council.

The State Council of South Korea performs somewhat different roles than those of many other nations with similar forms. As the Korean political system is basically a presidential system yet with certain aspects of the parliamentary system combined, the council is a combination of both systems. More specifically, the Korean State Council performs policy resolutions as well as policy consultations to the President. Reflecting that South Korea is basically a presidential republic the State Council resolutions cannot bind the president's decision, and in this regard the Korean State Council is similar to advisory councils in strict presidential republics. At the same time, however, the Constitution of South Korea specifies in details 17 categories including budgetary and military matters, which necessitates the resolution of the State Council in addition to the President's approval, and in this regard the Korean State Council is similar to those State Councils in strict parliamentary systems.

== Meetings ==
Although the president is the chairman of the council, the Prime Minister nevertheless frequently holds the meetings without the presence of the President as the meeting can be lawfully held as long as the majority of the State Council members are present at the meeting. Also, as many government agencies have recently been moved out of Seoul into other parts of the country, the need to hold State Council meetings without having to convene in one place at the same time has been growing, and therefore the law has been amended to allow State Council meetings in a visual teleconference format.

== Members ==
As of August 2020, the Executive Branch of the government operates 23 ministries, 18 administrative authorities, 2 boards, 4 offices, and 7 committees. The State Council includes 18 ministers, the prime minister and the president. Ministers must be appointed into the State Council before confirmation by the National Assembly. The president is the chairperson of the State Council, and the prime minister is the vice-chairperson.

Although not the official members of the State Council the following individuals, and other officials designated by law or deemed necessary by the Chairperson of the State Council, can also attend State Council meetings and speak in front of the State Council without the right to vote on the matters discussed in the meetings of the SC-ROK. The individuals are:

- Presidential Chief of Staff (대통령비서실장)
- Director of the National Security Office (국가안보실장)
- Chief Presidential Secretary for Policy (대통령정책실장)
- Minister of Government Policy Coordination (국무조정실장)
- Minister of Personnel Management (인사혁신처장)
- Minister of Government Legislation (법제처장)
- Minister of Food and Drug Safety (식품의약품안전처장)
- Chairperson of the Korea Fair Trade Commission (공정거래위원회위원장)
- Chairperson of the Financial Services Commission (금융위원회위원장)
- Mayor of Seoul (서울특별시장)
- Mayor of Jeonnam–Gwangju (전남광주통합특별시장)

The Mayor of Seoul and Jeonnam–Gwangju, although being the head of a local autonomous region in South Korea and not directly related to the central executive branch, have been allowed to attend State Council meetings considering the special status of Seoul and Jeonnam–Gwangju as the Special Cities and their mayors as the only two cabinet-level mayor in Korea.

=== Current members ===
Cabinet of President Lee Jae Myung
| Office | Portrait | Name | Party | Ref. |
|---|---|---|---|---|
| Prime Minister; Announced 7 June 2026; Assumed office 1 July 2026 | | Han Seong-sook | Independent | |
| Deputy Prime Minister and Minister of Economy and Finance; Announced 30 August 2026; Assumed office 22 September 2026 | | Lee Hyoung-il | Independent | |
| Deputy Prime Minister and Minister of Science and ICT; Announced 23 June 2025; Assumed office 16 July 2025 | | Bae Kyung-hoon | Independent | |
| Minister of Education; Announced 13 August 2025; Assumed office 11 September 2025 | | Choi Kyo-jin | Independent | |
| Minister of Foreign Affairs; Announced 23 June 2025; Assumed office 19 July 2025 | | Cho Hyun | Democratic | |
| Minister of Unification; Announced 23 June 2025; Assumed office 25 July 2025 | | Chung Dong-young | Democratic | |
| Minister of Justice | | Vacant | | |
| Minister of National Defense; Announced 30 August 2026; Assumed office 22 September 2026 | | Kang Shin-chul | Independent | |
| Minister of the Interior and Safety; Announced 29 June 2025; Assumed office 19 July 2025 | | Yun Ho-jung | Democratic | |
| Minister of Patriots and Veterans Affairs; Announced 23 June 2025; Assumed office 25 July 2025 | | Kwon Oh-eul | Democratic | |
| Minister of Culture, Sports and Tourism; Announced 11 July 2025; Assumed office 31 July 2025 | | Chae Hwi-young | Independent | |
| Minister of Agriculture, Food and Rural Affairs; Assumed office 23 December 2023; Holdover from Yoon cabinet Announced 23 June 2025 | | Song Mi-ryung | Independent | |
| Minister of Trade, Industry and Resources; Announced 29 June 2025; Assumed office 19 July 2025 | | Kim Jung-kwan | Independent | |
| Minister of Health and Welfare; Announced 29 June 2025; Assumed office 21 July 2025 | | Jeong Eun-kyeong | Independent | |
| Minister of Climate, Energy and Environment; Announced 23 June 2025; Assumed office 21 July 2025 | | Kim Sung-whan | Democratic | |
| Minister of Employment and Labor; Announced 23 June 2025; Assumed office 21 July 2025 | | Kim Young-hoon | Democratic | |
| Minister of Gender Equality and Family; Announced 13 August 2025; Assumed office 10 September 2025 | | Won Min-kyong | Independent | |
| Minister of Land, Infrastructure and Transport; Announced 30 August 2026; Assumed office 22 September 2026 | | Hong Jee-sun | Independent | |
| Minister of Oceans and Fisheries; Announced 2 March 2026; Assumed office 25 March 2026 | | Hwang Jong-woo | Independent | |
| Minister of SMEs and Startups; Announced 30 August 2026; Assumed office 23 September 2026 | | Lee So-young | Democratic | |
| Minister of Planning and Budget; Announced 2 March 2026; Assumed office 25 March 2026 | | Park Hong-keun | Democratic | |
Other non-member attendees
| Chief of Staff to the President; Assumed office 15 October 2026 | | Lim Gwang-hyeon | Independent | |
| Director of National Security Office; Assumed office 4 June 2025 | | Wi Sung-lac | Democratic | |
| Chief Presidential Secretary for Policy; Assumed office 1 October 2026 | | Ha Joon-kyung | Independent | |
| Minister of Government Policy Coordination; Assumed office 10 July 2026 | | Lim Ki-keun | Independent | |
| Minister of Personnel Management; Assumed office 20 July 2025 | | Choi Dong-seok | Independent | |
| Minister of Government Legislation; Assumed office 13 July 2025 | | Jo Won-cheol | Independent | |
| Minister of Food and Drug Safety; Assumed office 27 May 2022; Holdover from Yoon cabinet | | Oh Yoo-kyung | Independent | |
| Chairperson of the Fair Trade Commission; Announced 13 August 2025; Assumed office 12 September 2025 | | Ju Biung-ghi | Independent | |
| Chairperson of the Financial Services Commission; Announced 13 August 2025; Assumed office 12 September 2025 | | Lee Eog-weon | Independent | |
| Director General of Free Trade Negotiations; Ministry of Trade, Industry and Resources; Assumed office 21 August 2026 | | Park Jung-sung | Independent | |
| Mayor of Seoul; Assumed office 8 April 2021; Holdover from Yoon cabinet | | Oh Se-hoon | People Power | |
| Mayor of Jeonnam–Gwangju; Assumed office 1 July 2026 | | Min Hyung-bae | Democratic | |

== List of cabinets of South Korea ==
- Cabinet of Lee Myung-bak
- Cabinet of Park Geun-hye
- Cabinet of Moon Jae-in
- Cabinet of Yoon Suk Yeol
- Cabinet of Lee Jae Myung

== See also ==
- The Blue House
- Politics of South Korea
- Impeachment in South Korea
