= Cabinet of Moon Jae-in =

State Council of former South Korean President Moon Jae-in

- State Council of South Korea
- 2017–2022
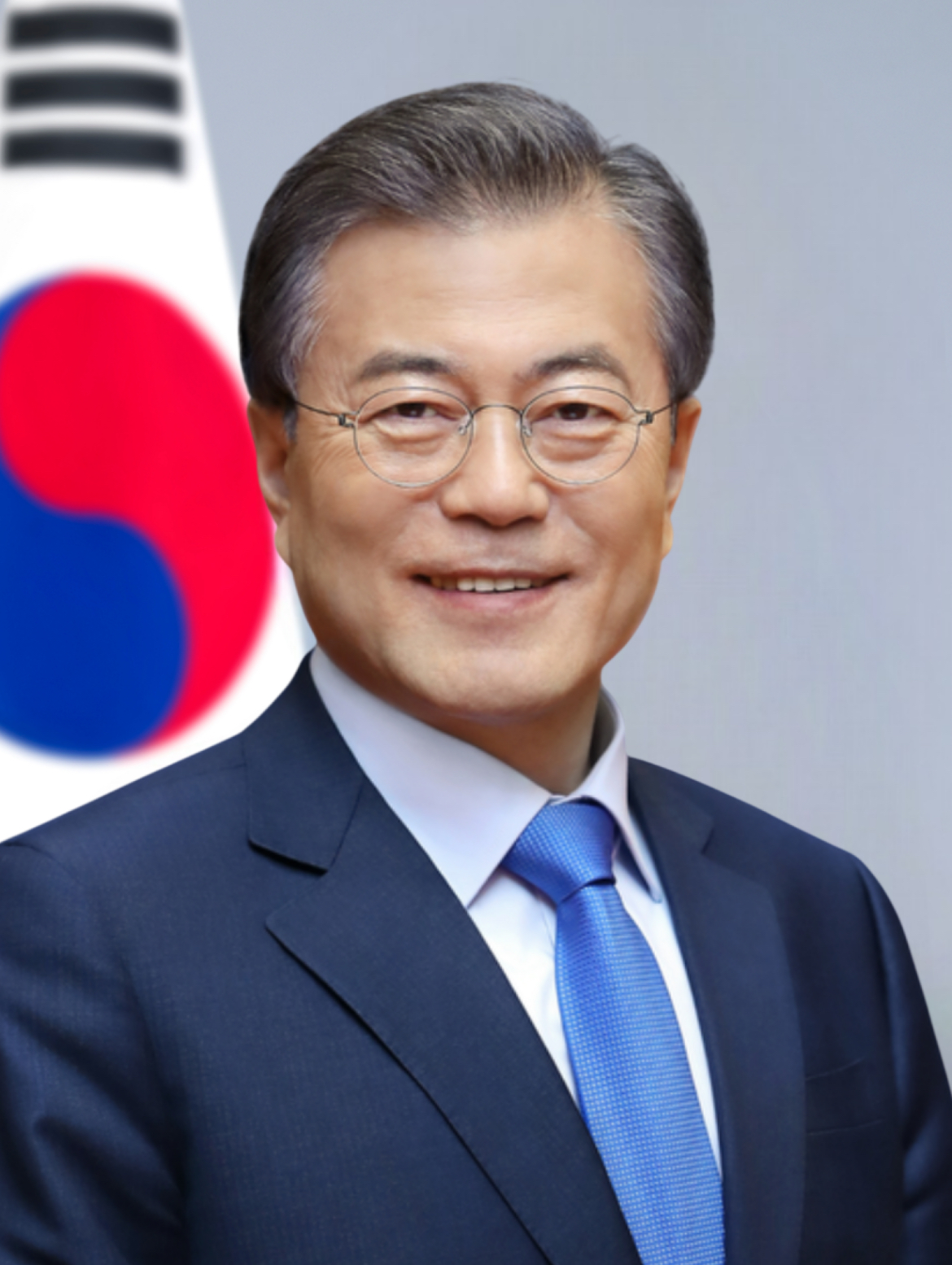
- Date formed: 10 May 2017
- Date dissolved: 10 May 2022

People and organisations
- President: Moon Jae-in
- Prime Minister: Hwang Kyo-ahn; Yoo Il-ho (acting); Lee Nak-yeon; Chung Sye-kyun; Hong Nam-ki (acting); Kim Boo-kyum
- Member party: Democratic Party
- Opposition parties: Liberty Korea Party (before 2020); New Conservative Party (2019-2020); Onward for Future 4.0 (2019-2020); Future Korea Party (2020); People Party (2020-2022); People Power Party (since 2020)

History
- Outgoing formation: 2022 presidential election
- Elections: 2017 presidential election; 2020 legislative election
- Predecessor: Cabinet of Park Geun-hye
- Successor: Cabinet of Yoon Suk Yeol

This page provides the list of all members – incumbent and previous – of the State Council of South Korean President Moon Jae-in.

== Cabinet ==
Key
Democratic Party
Independent politician

Cabinet of President Moon Jae-in
Post	Minister	Term	Ref.
Cabinet ministers
President	Moon Jae-in	10 May 2017 – 9 May 2022	
Prime Minister	Lee Nak-yon	31 May 2017 – 13 January 2020	
Prime Minister	Chung Sye-kyun	14 January 2020 – 16 April 2021	
Prime Minister	Kim Boo-kyum	14 May 2021 – 11 May 2022	
Deputy Prime Minister of Economy; Minister of Economy and Finance	Kim Dong-yeon	9 June 2017 – 10 December 2018	
Deputy Prime Minister of Economy; Minister of Economy and Finance	Hong Nam-ki	11 December 2018 – 9 May 2022	
Deputy Prime Minister of Social Affairs; Minister of Education	Kim Sang-gon	4 July 2017 – 2 October 2018	
Deputy Prime Minister of Social Affairs; Minister of Education	Yoo Eun-hae	2 October 2018 – 9 May 2022: First woman to become deputy prime minister	
Minister of Science and ICT	You Young-min	11 July 2017 – 8 September 2019	
Minister of Science and ICT	Choi Ki-young	9 September 2019 – 13 May 2021	
Minister of Science and ICT	Lim Hyesook	14 May 2021 – 9 May 2022: Ministry's first woman head	
Minister of Foreign Affairs	Kang Kyung-wha	18 June 2017 – 8 February 2021: Ministry's first woman head	
Minister of Foreign Affairs	Chung Eui-yong	9 February 2021 – 12 May 2022	
Minister of Unification	Cho Myoung-gyon	3 July 2017 – 8 April 2019	
Minister of Unification	Kim Yeon-chul	8 April 2019 – 19 June 2020	
Minister of Unification	Lee In-young	27 July 2020 – 9 May 2022	
Minister of Justice	Park Sang-ki	19 July 2017 – 8 September 2019	
Minister of Justice	Cho Kuk	9 September 2019 – 14 October 2019	
Minister of Justice	Choo Mi-ae	2 January 2020 – 27 January 2021	
Minister of Justice	Park Beom-kye	28 January 2021 – 9 May 2022	
Minister of National Defense	Song Young-moo	13 July 2017 – 21 September 2018	
Minister of National Defense	Jeong Kyeong-doo	21 September 2018 – 17 September 2020	
Minister of National Defense	Suh Wook	18 September 2020 – 9 May 2022	
Minister of the Interior and Safety	Kim Boo-kyum	16 June 2017 – 5 April 2019	
Minister of the Interior and Safety	Chin Young	6 April 2019 – 24 December 2020	
Minister of the Interior and Safety	Jeon Hae-cheol	24 December 2020 – 12 May 2022	
Minister of Culture, Sports and Tourism	Do Jong-hwan	16 June 2017 – 2 April 2019	
Minister of Culture, Sports and Tourism	Park Yang-woo	3 April 2019 – 10 February 2021	
Minister of Culture, Sports and Tourism	Hwang Hee	11 February 2021 – 13 May 2022	
Minister of Agriculture, Food and Rural Affairs	Kim Yung-rok	3 July 2017 – 15 March 2018	
Minister of Agriculture, Food and Rural Affairs	Lee Gae-ho	10 August 2018 – 30 August 2019	
Minister of Agriculture, Food and Rural Affairs	Kim Hyeon-soo	31 August 2019 – 9 May 2022	
Minister of Trade, Industry and Energy	Paik Un-gyu	22 July 2017 – 21 September 2018	
Minister of Trade, Industry and Energy	Sung Yun-mo	21 September 2018 – 5 May 2021	
Minister of Trade, Industry and Energy	Moon Sung-wook	6 May 2021 – 12 May 2022	
Minister of Health and Welfare	Park Neung-hoo	22 July 2017 – 24 December 2020	
Minister of Health and Welfare	Kwon Deok-cheol	24 December 2020 – 17 May 2022	
Minister of Environment	Kim Eun-kyung	4 July 2017 – 9 November 2018	
Minister of Environment	Cho Myung-rae	9 November 2018 – 22 January 2021	
Minister of Environment	Han Jeoung-ae	22 January 2021 – 9 May 2022	
Minister of Employment and Labor	Kim Young-joo	14 August 2017 – 21 September 2018: Ministry's first woman head	
Minister of Employment and Labor	Lee Jae-gap	21 September 2018 – 6 May 2021	
Minister of Employment and Labor	An Kyung-duk	7 May 2021 – 9 May 2022	
Minister of Gender Equality and Family	Chung Hyun-back	7 July 2017 – 21 September 2018	
Minister of Gender Equality and Family	Jin Sun-mee	21 September 2018 – 8 September 2019	
Minister of Gender Equality and Family	Lee Jung-ok	9 September 2019 – 28 December 2020	
Minister of Gender Equality and Family	Chung Young-ai	29 December 2020 – 17 May 2022	
Minister of Land, Infrastructure and Transport	Kim Hyun-mee	21 June 2017 – 28 December 2020: Ministry's first woman head	
Minister of Land, Infrastructure and Transport	Byeon Chang-heum	29 December 2020 – 16 April 2021	
Minister of Land, Infrastructure and Transport	Noh Hyeong-ouk	14 May 2021 – 13 May 2022	
Minister of Oceans and Fisheries	Kim Young-choon	16 June 2017 – 2 April 2019	
Minister of Oceans and Fisheries	Moon Seong-hyeok	3 April 2019 – 9 May 2022	
Minister of SMEs and Startups	Hong Jong-hak	21 November 2017 – 8 April 2019	
Minister of SMEs and Startups	Park Young-sun	8 April 2019 – 20 January 2021: Ministry's first woman head	
Minister of SMEs and Startups	Kwon Chil-seung	5 February 2021 – 12 May 2022	
Other non-member attendees. Source:
Chief of Staff to the President	Im Jong-seok	10 May 2017 – 8 January 2019	
Chief of Staff to the President	Noh Young-min	9 January 2019 – 31 December 2020	
Chief of Staff to the President	You Young-min	1 January 2021 – 9 May 2022	
Director of National Security Office	Chung Eui-yong	21 May 2017 – 2 July 2020	
Director of National Security Office	Suh Hoon	3 July 2020 – 9 May 2022	
Chief Presidential Secretary for Policy	Jang Ha-sung	21 May 2017 – 9 November 2018	
Chief Presidential Secretary for Policy	Kim Soo-hyun	10 November 2018 – 21 June 2019	
Chief Presidential Secretary for Policy	Kim Sang-jo	21 June 2019 – 29 March 2021	
Chief Presidential Secretary for Policy	Lee Ho-seung	29 March 2021 – 9 May 2022	
Minister for Government Policy Coordination	Hong Nam-ki	11 May 2017 – 9 November 2018	
Minister for Government Policy Coordination	Noh Hyeong-ouk	9 November 2018 – 8 May 2022	
Minister for Government Policy Coordination	Koo Yun-cheol	9 May 2020 – 7 June 2022	
Minister of Patriots and Veterans Affairs	Pi Woo-jin	17 May 2017 – 14 August 2019: Ministry's first woman head	
Minister of Patriots and Veterans Affairs	Park Sam-duck	16 August 2019 – 30 December 2020	
Minister of Patriots and Veterans Affairs	Hwang Ki-chul	31 December 2020 – 12 May 2022	
Minister of Personnel Management	Kim Pan-seok	13 July 2017 – 14 December 2018	
Minister of Personnel Management	Hwang Seo-chong	14 December 2018 – 26 March 2021	
Minister of Personnel Management	Kim Woo-ho	27 March 2021 – 13 May 2022	
Minister of Government Legislation	Kim Oe-sook	12 June 2017 – 27 May 2019	
Minister of Government Legislation	Kim Hyung-yeon	28 May 2019 – 14 August 2020	
Minister of Government Legislation	Lee Kang-seop	15 August 2020 – 13 May 2022	
Minister of Food and Drug Safety	Ryu Youngjin	13 July 2017 – 7 March 2019	
Minister of Food and Drug Safety	Lee Eui-kyung	8 March 2019 – 1 November 2020	
Minister of Food and Drug Safety	Kim Ganglip	2 November 2020 – 26 May 2022	
Chairperson of Korea Fair Trade Commission	Kim Sang-jo	13 June 2017 – 21 June 2019	
Chairperson of Korea Fair Trade Commission	Joh Sung-wook	9 September 2019 – 8 September 2022: Commission's first woman head	
Chairperson of Financial Services Commission	Choi Jong-gu	19 July 2017 – 8 September 2019	
Chairperson of Financial Services Commission	Eun Seong-soo	9 September 2019 – 30 August 2021	
Chairperson of Financial Services Commission	Koh Seungbeom	31 August 2021 – 10 July 2022	
Vice Minister for Science, Technology and Innovation	Park Gi-young	7 August 2017 – 11 August 2017	
Vice Minister for Science, Technology and Innovation	Lim Dae-sik	31 August 2017 – 23 May 2019	
Vice Minister for Science, Technology and Innovation	Kim Sung-soo	23 May 2019 – 14 June 2021	
Vice Minister for Science, Technology and Innovation	Lee Gyung-su	14 June 2021 – 13 May 2022	
Minister for Trade	Kim Hyun-jong	31 July 2017 – 27 February 2019	
Minister for Trade	Yoo Myung-hee	28 February 2019 – 6 August 2021: First woman trade minister	
Minister for Trade	Yeo Han-koo	9 August 2021 – 9 May 2022	
Mayor of Seoul	Park Won-soon	27 October 2011 – 9 July 2020	
Mayor of Seoul	Oh Se-hoon	8 April 2021 – present	

== See also ==
- Cabinet of South Korea
- Cabinet of Park Geun-hye
- Cabinet of Yoon Suk-yeol
