= Cabinet of Yoon Suk Yeol =

Government of South Korea from 2022 to 2025

- State Council of South Korea
- 2022–2025
- Date formed: 10 May 2022
- Date dissolved: 4 June 2025

People and organisations
- President: Yoon Suk Yeol (Impeached) (Note: His powers and duties were suspended since 14 December 2024 due to his impeachment by the National Assembly until the final impeachment verdict removing him from office on 4 April 2025); Acting president: Han Duck-soo (Dec 2024); Choi Sang-mok (Dec 2024 – Mar 2025); Han Duck-soo (Mar–May 2025); Lee Ju-ho (May–Jun 2025); Vacant: 1:00–6:21 a.m (4 June 2025)
- Prime Minister: Han Duck-soo (Impeached); Acting prime minister: Choo Kyung-ho; Han Duck-soo; Choi Sang-mok; Han Duck-soo; Lee Ju-ho
- Deputy Prime Minister: Choo Kyung-ho; Choo Kyung-ho and Park Soon-ae; Choo Kyung-ho and Lee Ju-ho; Choi Sang-mok and Lee Ju-ho; Lee Ju-ho
- Member party: People Power Party
- Status in legislature: Minority government
- Opposition parties: Democratic Party; Rebuilding Korea; New Reform; Progressive; Basic Income; Social Democratic; Independent
- Opposition leader: Lee Jae-myung

History
- Outgoing formation: Impeachment of Yoon Suk Yeol; 2025 presidential election
- Elections: 2022 presidential election; 2024 legislative election
- Predecessor: Cabinet of Moon Jae-in
- Successor: Cabinet of Lee Jae Myung

This page provides the list of members – incumbent and nominated – of the State Council of South Korean President Yoon Suk Yeol. Though Yoon was removed from office on 4 April 2025 due to his impeachment by the National Assembly, and Prime Minister Han Duck-soo and First Deputy Prime Minister Choi Sang-mok resigned on 1 May 2025, the rest of the cabinet continued to govern until the inauguration of Lee Jae-myung on 4 June.

In December 2023, Yoon carried out a major overhaul, replacing about a third of his cabinet members ahead of the legislative election in April 2024.

== State Council ==
=== President ===
Yoon Suk Yeol defeated the Democratic Party nomineee, Lee Jae Myung, in the 2022 presidential election. He assumes office on 11 May 2022. Yoon was suspended from 14 December 2024 onwards and was arrested on 15 January 2025. He was successfully impeached from office on 4 April 2025.

President of South Korea
Portrait	Name	Date of birth	Party	Background	Reference
	Yoon Suk Yeol	18 December 1960 (age 65)	People Power	Prosecutor General of South Korea (2019–2021); Prosecutor	

=== Cabinet ===
Cabinet of President Yoon Suk Yeol
Serving in an acting capacity Resigned from office
Office	Portrait	Name	Party	Ref.
Acting president Assumed office 14 December 2024; Suspended 27 December 2024 onwards Reinstated 24 March 2025; Resigns 1 May 2025		Han Duck-soo	Independent	
Prime Minister; Assumed office 21 May 2022; Suspended 27 December 2024 onwards Reinstated 24 March 2025; Resigns 1 May 2025		Han Duck-soo	Independent	
Acting president Assumed office 27 December 2024; Relieved 24 March 2025		Choi Sang-mok	Independent	
Acting Prime Minister; Assumed office 27 December 2024; Relieved 24 March 2025		Choi Sang-mok	Independent	
Deputy Prime Minister and Minister of Economy and Finance; Assumed office 29 December 2023; Resigns 1 May 2025		Choi Sang-mok	Independent	
Acting president Assumed office 2 May 2025; Ended 4 June 2025		Lee Ju-ho	Independent	
Acting Prime Minister; Assumed office 2 May 2025; Ended 4 June 2025		Lee Ju-ho	Independent	
Deputy Prime Minister and Minister of Education; Assumed office 7 November 2022; Ended 29 July 2025		Lee Ju-ho	Independent	
Deputy Prime Minister and Minister of Economy and Finance; Assumed office 10 May 2022; Resigns 28 December 2023		Choo Kyung-ho	People Power	
Minister of Education; Assumed office 5 July 2022; Resigns 8 August 2022		Park Soon-ae	Independent	
Ministry of Science and ICT; Assumed office 10 May 2022; Ended 16 August 2024		Lee Jong-ho	Independent	
Ministry of Science and ICT; Assumed office 16 August 2024; Ended 16 July 2025		Yoo Sang-im	Independent	
Minister of Foreign Affairs; Assumed office 12 May 2022; Ended 10 January 2024		Park Jin	People Power	
Minister of Foreign Affairs; Assumed office 11 January 2024; Ended 18 July 2025		Cho Tae-yul	Independent	
Minister of Unification; Assumed office 16 May 2022; Ended 28 July 2023		Kwon Young-se	People Power	
Minister of Unification; Assumed office 31 July 2023; Ended 25 July 2025		Kim Yung-ho	Independent	
Minister of Justice; Assumed office 17 May 2022; Ended 21 December 2023		Han Dong-hoon	Independent	
Minister of Justice; Assumed office 20 February 2024; Suspended 12 December 2024 onwards Reinstated 10 April 2025; Ended 4 June 2025		Park Sung-jae	Independent	
Minister of National Defense; Assumed office 10 May 2022; Ended 6 October 2023		Lee Jong-sup	Independent	
Minister of National Defense; Assumed office 7 October 2023; Ended 9 September 2024		Shin Won-sik	People Power	
Minister of National Defense; Assumed office 10 September 2024; Resigns 5 December 2024; Arrested 8 December 2024		Kim Yong-hyun	Independent	
Minister of the Interior and Safety; Assumed office 12 May 2022; Resigns 8 December 2024		Lee Sang-min	Independent	
Minister of Patriots and Veterans Affairs; Assumed office 5 June 2023; Ended 25 December 2023		Park Min-shik	People Power	
Minister of Patriots and Veterans Affairs; Assumed office 26 December 2023; Ended 25 July 2025		Kang Jung-ai	Independent	
Minister of Culture, Sports and Tourism; Assumed office 13 May 2022; Ended 6 October 2023		Park Bo-gyoon	Independent	
Minister of Culture, Sports and Tourism; Assumed office 7 October 2023; Ended 31 July 2025		Yu In-chon	Independent	
Minister of Agriculture, Food and Rural Affairs; Assumed office 10 May 2022; Ended 28 December 2023		Chung Hwang-keun	Independent	
Minister of Agriculture, Food and Rural Affairs; Assumed office 29 December 2023; Continued under the Lee cabinet		Song Mi-ryung	Independent	
Minister of Trade and Industry; Assumed office 12 May 2022; Ended 19 September 2023		Lee Chang-yang	Independent	
Minister of Trade and Industry; Assumed office 20 September 2023; Ended 4 January 2024		Bang Moon-kyu	Independent	
Minister of Trade and Industry; Assumed office 5 January 2024; Ended 18 July 2025		Ahn Duk-geun	Independent	
Minister of Health and Welfare; Assumed office 5 October 2022; Ended 21 July 2025		Cho Kyoo-hong	Independent	
Minister of Environment; Assumed office 10 May 2022; Ended 24 July 2024		Han Wha-jin	Independent	
Minister of Environment; Assumed office 25 July 2024; Ended 21 July 2025		Kim Wan-sup	Independent	
Minister of Employment and Labor; Assumed office 10 May 2022; Ended 29 August 2024		Lee Jeong-sik	Independent	
Minister of Employment and Labor; Assumed office 29 August 2024; Ended 8 April 2025		Kim Moon-soo	People Power	
Minister of Gender Equality and Family; Assumed office 17 May 2022; Ended 22 February 2024		Kim Hyun-sook	Independent	
Minister of Land, Infrastructure and Transport; Assumed office 13 May 2022; Ended 22 December 2023		Won Hee-ryong	People Power	
Minister of Land, Infrastructure and Transport; Assumed office 23 December 2023; Ended 29 July 2025		Park Sang-woo	Independent	
Minister of Oceans and Fisheries; Assumed office 10 May 2022; Ended 28 December 2023		Cho Seung-hwan	Independent	
Minister of Oceans and Fisheries; Assumed office 29 December 2023; Ended 23 July 2025		Kang Do-hyung	Independent	
Minister of SMEs and Startups; Assumed office 12 May 2022; Ended 28 December 2023		Lee Young	People Power	
Minister of SMEs and Startups; Assumed office 29 December 2023; Ended 23 July 2025		Oh Young-ju	Independent	
Other non-member attendees. Source:
Chief of Staff to the President; Assumed office 10 May 2022; Ended 31 December 2023		Kim Dae-ki	Independent	
Chief of Staff to the President; Assumed office 1 January 2024; Ended 22 April 2024		Lee Kwan-sup	Independent	
Chief of Staff to the President; Assumed office 22 April 2024; Ended 4 June 2025		Chung Jin-suk	People Power	
Director of National Security Office; Assumed office 10 May 2022; Ended 29 March 2023		Kim Sung-han	Independent	
Director of National Security Office; Assumed office 30 March 2023; Ended 31 December 2023		Cho Tae-yong	Independent	
Director of National Security Office; Assumed office 1 January 2024; Ended 12 August 2024		Chang Ho-jin	Independent	
Director of National Security Office; Assumed office 13 August 2024; Ended 3 June 2025		Shin Won-sik	Independent	
Minister of Government Policy Coordination; Assumed office 8 June 2022; Ended 24 August 2023		Bang Moon-kyu	Independent	
Minister of Government Policy Coordination; Assumed office 25 August 2023; Ended 23 June 2025		Bang Ki-sun	Independent	
Minister of Patriots and Veterans Affairs; Assumed office 13 May 2022; Ended 26 December 2023		Park Min-shik	People Power	
Minister of Personnel Management; Assumed office 13 May 2022; Ended 20 July 2025		Kim Seung-ho	Independent	
Minister of Government Legislation; Assumed office 13 May 2022; Ended 13 July 2025		Lee Wan-kyu	Independent	
Minister of Food and Drug Safety; Assumed office 27 May 2022; Continued under the Lee cabinet		Oh Yoo-kyung	Independent	
Chairperson of the Fair Trade Commission; Assumed office 16 September 2022; Ended 31 July 2025		Han Ki-jeong	Independent	
Chairperson of the Financial Services Commission; Assumed office 11 July 2022; Ended 31 July 2025		Kim Joo-hyun	Independent	
Vice Minister for Science, Technology and Innovation; Assumed office 13 May 2022; Ended 26 February 2024		Joo Young-chang	Independent	
Vice Minister for Science, Technology and Innovation; Assumed office 26 February 2024; Ended 16 July 2025		Ryu Kwang-jun	Independent	
Minister for Trade; Assumed office 10 May 2022; Ended 4 January 2024		Ahn Duk-geun	Independent	
Minister for Trade; Assumed office 10 January 2024; Ended 10 July 2025		Cheong Inkyo	Independent	
Mayor of Seoul; Assumed office 8 April 2021; Continued under the Lee cabinet		Oh Se-hoon	People Power	

== See also ==
- Cabinet of South Korea
- Cabinet of Park Geun-hye
- Cabinet of Moon Jae-in
- Cabinet of Lee Jae-myung
