= Joh Sung-wook =

South Korean economist (born 1964)

- 조성욱
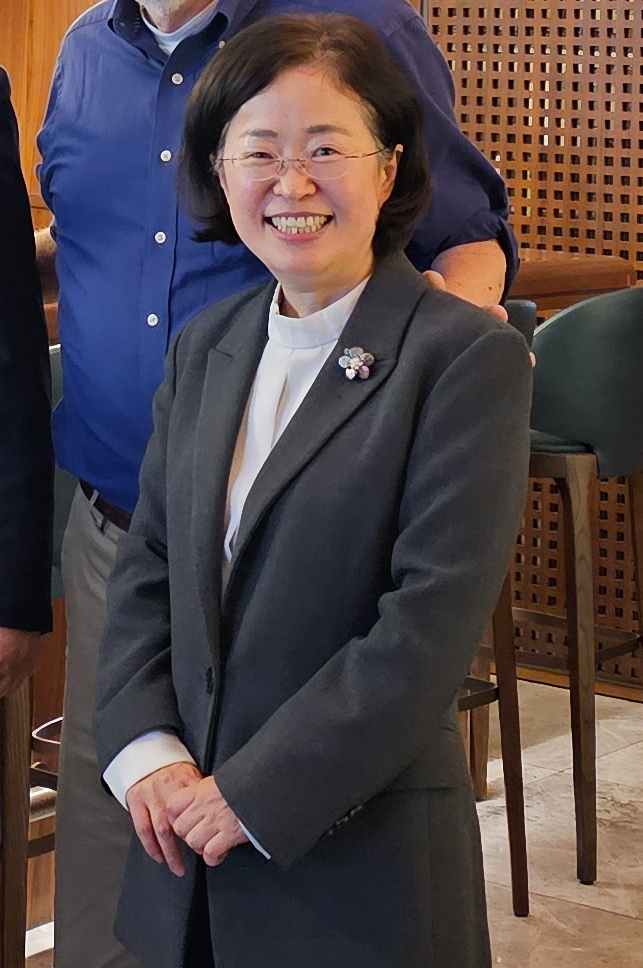
- Joh in 2024

Chairperson of Korea Fair Trade Commission
- In office 9 September 2019 – 8 September 2022
- President: Moon Jae-in
- Prime Minister: Lee Nak-yeon; Chung Sye-kyun
- Preceded by: Kim Sang-jo
- Succeeded by: Han Ki-jeong

Personal details
- Born: 1964 (age 61–62) Cheongju, South Korea
- Education: Seoul National University; Harvard University

Joh Sung-wook (Korean: 조성욱; Hanja: 趙成旭; born 1964) is a professor of finance at Seoul National University Business School who served as the chairperson of Fair Trade Commission (KFTC) under President Moon Jae-in from 2019 to 2022. She was the first woman to lead the South Korean antitrust agency since its creation in 1980s. Previously, she was also the first Korean woman to study doctorate-level economics at Harvard University as well as the first woman to join faculty of business schools at Korea University and most recently Seoul National University respectively.

== Education ==
She holds three degrees in economics: bachelor and master from Seoul National University and doctorate from Harvard University. She was the first Korean woman to study doctorate-level economics at Harvard.

== Career ==
=== Teaching ===
Joh started her teaching career at State University of New York at Albany as its assistant professor of economics from 1994 to 1997. From 2003 to 2005 she was an associate professor of finance at Korea University Business School and its first female faculty member as well as a visiting associate professor at Hitotsubashi University in Tokyo. She received the title of being the first female faculty member again in 2005 when she transferred to Seoul National University Business School as its associate professor of finance. She is now its professor of finance.

=== Fair trade and competition regulation ===
Since November 2018, Joh has served as member of economics sub-committee of Regulatory Reform Committee led by the president. From April 2013 to April 2019, she served as non-standing commissioner of Securities and Futures Commission, which is similar to U.S. Securities and Exchange Commission and a sub-commission within the South Korean Financial Services Commission. From 1997 to 2003 she advised government on its Chaebol policies as the research fellow at Korea Development Institute where she worked with now-senior opposition figure, Yoo Seong-min. Since then, she took various governmental roles at now-Ministry of Economy and Finance, Prime Minister's Office, KFTC, Korea Corporate Governance Service of Korea Exchange and Financial Services Commission mostly as their advisor on policy formulation and evaluation.

As chairperson of the Fair Trade Commission, the role to which Joh was appointed in 2019, she was reportedly regarded to take similar stances and leadership as her predecessor Kim Sang-jo, President Moon Jae-in's first KFTC chairperson and top policy aide. Joh and the head of Financial Services Commission who both serve with the fixed term of three years have expressed their intentions to resign upon the inauguration of the new administration following the customs of their predecessors.

=== Other roles ===
Joh also took various roles in academia. She is an honorary president of Financial Information Society of Korea and an auditor of Korea Monetary and Finance Association which she previously served as its president and vice-president respectively. She is also a board member of Korea Academic Society of Industrial Organization. From 2010 to 2013 Joh was one of non-executive directors of Hanwha Group one of South Korean Chaebols.

She served as a visiting scholar at International Monetary Fund in 2008 and a visiting research fellow at Development Bank of Japan in 2004.

== Research ==
Her article in 2003, which identified poor corporate governance as a cause of 1997 Asian financial crisis in South Korea, is in the Hall of Fame at Journal of Financial Economics.
