= Jungnang B =

Constituency in Seoul, South Korea

- Single-member constituency for the National Assembly
- Location of the constituency
- District(s): Jungnang District (part)
- Region: Seoul
- Electorate: 192,315 (2016)

Current constituency
- Created: 1988
- Seats: 1
- Party: Democratic Party
- Member: Park Hong-keun
- Created from: Dongdaemun

Jungnang B (Korean: 중랑구 을) is a constituency of the National Assembly of South Korea. The constituency consists of part of Jungnang District, Seoul. As of 2016, 192,315 eligible voters were registered in the constituency.

== List of members of the National Assembly ==
Election	Member	Party	Dates	Notes
1988	Kim Deok-kyu	Peace Democratic	1988–1996	
1992	Kim Deok-kyu	Democratic	1988–1996	
1996	Kim Choong-il	New Korea	1996–2000	
2000	Kim Deok-kyu	Millennium Democratic	2000–2008	Deputy Speaker of the National Assembly (2004–2006)
2004	Kim Deok-kyu	Uri	2000–2008	Deputy Speaker of the National Assembly (2004–2006)
2008	Jin Sung-ho	Grand National	2008–2012	
2012	Park Hong-keun	Democratic United	2012–present	
2016	Park Hong-keun	Democratic	2012–present	
2020	Park Hong-keun	Democratic	2012–present	
2024	Park Hong-keun	Democratic	2012–present	

== Recent election results ==
=== 2024 ===
Legislative Election 2024: Jungnang B
Party	Candidate	Votes	%	±%
Democratic	Park Hong-keun	73,600	57.72	▼1.56
People Power	Lee Seung-hwan	53,898	42.27	▲4.20
Rejected ballots		1,664	–	
Turnout		129,162	68.65	▲2.97
Registered electors		188,139		
Democratic hold		Swing		

=== 2020 ===
Legislative Election 2020: Jungnang B
Party	Candidate	Votes	%	±%
Democratic	Park Hong-keun	74,131	59.28	▲15.0
United Future	Yoon Sang-il	47,603	38.07	▲1.38
Minjung	Lee So-young	1,956	1.56	new
National Revolutionary	Shin Hwang-woo	722	0.57	new
Korea Welfare	Min Jeong-gi	625	0.49	new
Rejected ballots		1,362	–	
Turnout		126,399	65.68	▲6.82
Registered electors		192,460		
Democratic hold		Swing		

=== 2016 ===
Legislative Election 2016: Jungnang B
Party	Candidate	Votes	%	±%
Democratic	Park Hong-keun	49,620	44.3	+
Saenuri	Kang Dong-ho	41,117	36.7	−
People	Kang Won	16,219	14.5	new
Independent	Yoon Jung-hwa	3,304	3.0	new
Independent	Kim Min-sang	1,784	1.6	new
Rejected ballots		1,438	–	–
Turnout		113,482	59.0	+4.8
Registered electors		192,315		
Democratic hold		Swing		

=== 2012 ===
Legislative Election 2012: Jungnang B
Party	Candidate	Votes	%	±%
Democratic United	Park Hong-keun	44,212	44.5	+10.9
Saenuri	Kang Dong-ho	43,358	43.6	+4.1
Real Democratic	Kim Deok-kyu	5,606	5.6	−30.0
Independent	Jin Sung-ho	4,288	4.3	−35.2
Independent	Lee Kyung-tae	1,152	1.2	new
Nations’ Happiness	Yoon Jung-ho	741	0.8	new
Rejected ballots		616	–	–
Turnout		99,973	54.2	+9.6
Registered electors		184,587		
Democratic United gain from Saenuri		Swing		

== See also ==
- List of constituencies of the National Assembly of South Korea
