= Park Soon-ae =

South Korean policy analyst (born 1965)

- 박순애
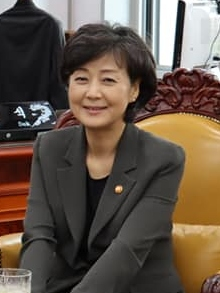

Minister of Education
- In office 5 July 2022 – 8 August 2022
- President: Yoon Suk-yeol
- Prime Minister: Han Duck-soo
- Preceded by: Yoo Eun-hae
- Succeeded by: Lee Ju-ho

Korean name
- Hangul: 박순애
- RR: Bak Sunae
- MR: Pak Sunae

Park Soon-ae (Korean: 박순애; born 21 April 1965) is a South Korean politician who served as the minister of education under President Yoon Suk-yeol from July to August 2022.

== Minister of Education ==
As of May 2022, there were only three women among the State Councilors of the Yoon Suk Yeol government and only two women among the vice-ministerial level officials. This was criticised as a lack of women's representation in the government. In response to these criticisms, Yoon appointed Park Soon-ae as the Minister of Education and Kim Seung-hee as the Minister of Welfare, increasing the ratio of female-to-male ministers in the cabinet to 30%.

Park Soon-ae resigned on 5 August, just 34 days into her tenure; Yoon's approval rating had fallen from 30% to 24%, largely due to public backlash against Park's school reform plans.
