= Han Ki-jeong =

South Korean politician and academic

Chairman of the Fair Trade Commission
- In office September 16, 2022 – July 31, 2025

Personal details
- Born: February 10, 1964 (age 62) Seoul, South Korea
- Education: Seoul National University; University of Cambridge

Han Ki-jeong (born February 10, 1964) is a South Korean politician and academic. Han was the Chairman of the Fair Trade Commission, Dean of the Seoul National University College of Law, an independent director for the Korea Exchange Bank and Hana Bank, and a professor at Seoul National University.

== Early life ==
Han was born on February 10, 1964, in Seoul, South Korea. Han graduated from Yangchung High School. Koh earned a bachelor's degree from Seoul National University's Public Law Department, and a master's degree in Public Administration from Seoul National University's Graduate School of Public Administration. He gained a doctor of philosophy degree from the University of Cambridge. He went to Seoul National University with Won Hee-ryong and Choi Sang-mok.

== Career ==
From 1990 to 1993, Han was employed by Samsung Life Insurance. Han was a lecturer and assistant professor at Hallym University from 1997 to 2000. From 1999 to 2007, Han was an expert committee member for the Ministry of Information and Communication. From 2000 to 2007, Han was an assistant and associate professor for Ewha Woman's University. From 2003 to 2004, Koh was a research fellow for the Korea Insurance Development Institute. Koh was part of a task force in the Ministry of Finance and Economy to amend the Insurance Business Act. From 2005 to 2006, Koh was the Director of International Cooperation at the Korean Society of Comparative Law.

In 2005, Koh became the Director of the Korean Insurance Society. In 2006, Koh became head of a task force in the Ministry of Finance and Economy on the integration of similar insurance products and insurance fraud. From 2006 to 2007, Koh was a member of an insurance subcommittee in the Financial Development Council and the Advisory Committee of the Listing of Life Insurance Companies in the Korea Exchange. Koh was the editorial director of the Korean Commercial Law Association. From 2008 to 2009, Koh was the head professor of two financial law programs in Seoul National University College of Law. From 2008 to 2010, Koh was the head professor of the Advanced Leadership Program in the same college, and member of the insurance subcommittee of the Financial Development Council in the Financial Services Commission. In 2008, Koh was the Director of the Korean Commercial Law Association, legal advisor of the User Network Bureau of the Korea Communications Commission, and member of the Research Advisory Committee of the Korea Insurance Research Institute.

In 2009, Koh was the financial dispute mediation specialist in the Financial Supervisory Service, and director of research and vice president of the Korean Insurance Law Association. From 2010 to 2016, Koh was associate dean for academic affairs for Seoul National University School of Law and Seoul National University College of Law. From 2012 to 2015, Koh was an independent director of the Korea Exchange Bank. In 2015, Koh was an independent director and member of the audit committee in Hana Bank. From 2016 to 2019, Koh was the President of the Korea Insurance Research Institute. From 2020 to 2022, Koh was dean of the Seoul National University School of Law. From 2021 to 2022, Koh was President of the Korean Law Schools Association.

Koh was nominated to become the Fair Trade Commission chairman by then-president Yoon Suk-Yeol after his first choice withdrew their nomination due to a controversial comment they made. Koh was inaugurated on September 16, 2022. During his time as chairman, Koh placed sanctions on technology firms that abused their power. In one case, Google was fined 42.1 billion won for abusing its power to ensure its top position in the South Korean mobile gaming app market.
