= Yoon Chang-ryul =

South Korean politician

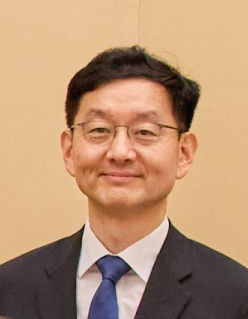
- Yoon in 2025

Minister of the Office for Government Policy Coordination
- Incumbent
- Assumed office June 23, 2025

Vice Minister of the Office for Government Policy Coordination
- In office 2021–2022

Personal details
- Education: Seoul National University; American University

Yoon Chang-ryul (Korean: 윤창렬) is a South Korean politician. Yoon is the Minister of the Office for Government Policy Coordination and was the Vice Minister of the same ministry.

== Career ==
Yoon gained a bachelor's degree in political science and international relations from Seoul National University and a master's degree in public administration from Seoul National University and the American University.

Yoon was head of the LG Global Strategy Center from 2023 to 2025. From 2021 to 2022, Yoon was the Vice Minister of Government Policy Coordination. On June 23, 2025, Yoon became the Minister of the Office for Government Policy Coordination. President Lee Jae Myung gave Yoon his letter of appointment on July 4, 2025.
