= Kim Oe-sook =

South Korean lawyer (born 1967)

- 김외숙

Senior Presidential Secretary for Personnel Affairs
- In office 29 May 2019 – 9 May 2022
- President: Moon Jae-in
- Preceded by: Cho Hyun-ok
- Succeeded by: position abolished

Minister of Government Legislation
- In office 12 June 2017 – 29 May 2019
- President: Moon Jae-in
- Prime Minister: Lee Nak-yeon
- Succeeded by: Kim Hyeong-yeon

Personal details
- Born: 10 August 1967 (age 59) Pohang, South Korea
- Party: Democratic Party of Korea
- Education: Seoul National University (LLB); University of Virginia (LLM)

Korean name
- Hangul: 김외숙
- Hanja: 金外淑
- RR: Gim Oesuk
- MR: Kim Oesuk

Kim Oe-sook (Korean: 김외숙; born 10 August 1967) is a South Korean lawyer served as President Moon Jae-in's Senior Presidential Secretary for Personnel Affairs from 2019 to 2022 and previously served as his first Minister of Government Legislation - the second woman ever to lead the Ministry.

After passing the bar exam in 1989 and completing the training at the Judicial Research and Training Institute in 1992, she began and dedicated her career as a lawyer at law firm Busan, which is founded by Moon after former President and then-lawyer Roh Moo-hyun quit a law firm Roh and Moon jointly opened to become a lawmaker.

Kim took various roles: the Vice-president of Korean Women Lawyers Association, a member of Busan Regional Labor Relations Commission, a Commissioner of Council of Conciliation at Busan High Court and a member of Busan and Gyeongsangbuk-do Administrative Appeals Commissions. She also taught and led a law clinic at Dong-A University Law School as an adjunct professor.

Kim is one of few senior officials of Office of the President Moon Jae-in to keep their post despite offering their resignation in midst of Moon's secretariat reshuffles in August 2020.

She holds two degrees in law - a bachelor from Seoul National University and a master's from University of Virginia Law School.
