= Lim Ki-keun =

South Korean politician

- Lim in 2026

Minister of the Office for Government Policy Coordination
- Incumbent
- Assumed office July 10, 2026

Personal details
- Born: Haenam, South Korea
- Education: Seoul National University; Indiana University

Lim Ki-keun is a South Korean politician. Lim is the Minister of the Office for Government Policy Coordination. Lim was the Second Vice Minister of Economy and Finance and Vice Minister of Planning and Budget.

== Early life ==
Lim was born in Haenam, South Jeolla Province. Lim graduated from Songwon High School in 1986 and graduated with a bachelor´s degree in economics from the College of Business Administration of Seoul National University in 1992. He passed the 36th Public Administration Exam in 1992. Lim graduated from Indiana University with a master´s degree in economics in 2001.

== Career ==
Lim was the Director General for Administrative and National Defense Budget, Director General for Public Policy, Director General for Policy Coordination, Director General for Economic Budget, and Director General for Budget Coordination. In 2023, he was Deputy Minister for Fiscal Affairs. From December 2023 to 2025, Lim was the Administrator of the Public Procurement Service.

On June 10, 2025, Lim was nominated to become Second Vice Minister of Economy and Finance. On July 16, 2025, he called for an increase in budgetary efficiency in a meeting with officials from other ministries. On September 26, 2025, Lim gave the opening remarks at the 2025 Korea-OECD International Forum on Budgeting.

Lim was acting Minister of Planning and Budget after the Ministry of Economy and Finance was split. After the nomination of Lee Hye-hoon for Minister of Planning and Budget fell through, Lim led the ministry´s policy meetings. In 2026, Lim became Vice Minister of Planning and Budget.

On July 10, 2026, president Lee Jae Myung appointed Lim as the minister of the Office for Government Policy Coordination. In September 2026, Lim spoke at a forum on national development, stating that the government is working to make balanced national development happen. On October 13, 2026, Lim had an argument with Kim Jae-sub at an audit of the Office for Government Policy Coordination over real estate policy.
