= Koh Seungbeom =

South Korean politician

Chairman of the Financial Services Commission
- In office August 2021 – 2022
- President: Moon Jae-in

Personal details
- Born: 1962 (age 63–64) Seoul, South Korea
- Education: Seoul National University; American University

Koh Seungbeom (born 1962) is a South Korean politician. He was Chairman of the Financial Services Commission and a member of the Bank of Korea Monetary Policy Board.

== Early life ==
Koh was born in Seoul, South Korea, in 1962. He passed the civil service exam in 1984. Koh earned a bachelor´s degree and master´s degree from Seoul National University in 1985 and a doctorate in economics from the American University in Washington in 1995.

== Career ==
In 1986, Koh became employed by the International Finance Bureau and Economic Policy Bureau of the Ministry of Finance and Economy. From 1998 to 2001, Koh was an economist in the Asian Development Bank. In 2021, Koh became employed by the Financial Services Commission of Korea. He was Director General and Secretary General of the Financial Service Bureau.

In 2016, Koh became a member of the Bank of Korea´s Monetary Policy Board. In 2020, he became the first member of the board to get a second term. On August 3, 2021, Koh was the only member of the board to vote against not raising interest rates. Koh had to excuse himself from the approvals meetings of KakaoBank because his brother-in-law was the chairman and CEO of its largest shareholder.

On August 5, 2021, then-president Moon Jae-in nominated Koh to became the Chairman of the Financial Services Commission. On August 27, 2021, the National Assembly approved the nomination of Koh. During the confirmation, lawmakers of the opposing party expressed concerns that Koh´s brother-in-law is chairman and CEO of Korea Investment Holdings. The National Assembly´s approval came with a warning related to his potential conflicts of interest. The relation prevented Koh from being involved in the regulation of Korea Investment Holdings or anything it was affiliated with due to conflicts of interest. On September 2, 2021, Koh held his first meeting as Chairman of the Financial Services Commission.

In 2022, Koh left the Chairmanship of the Financial Services Commission. In 2022, Koh became a visiting fellow of the Korea Capital Market Institute. In 2025, Koh became a Senior Advisor to Bae, Kim, and Lee.
