= Kim Yong-beom =

South Korean politician

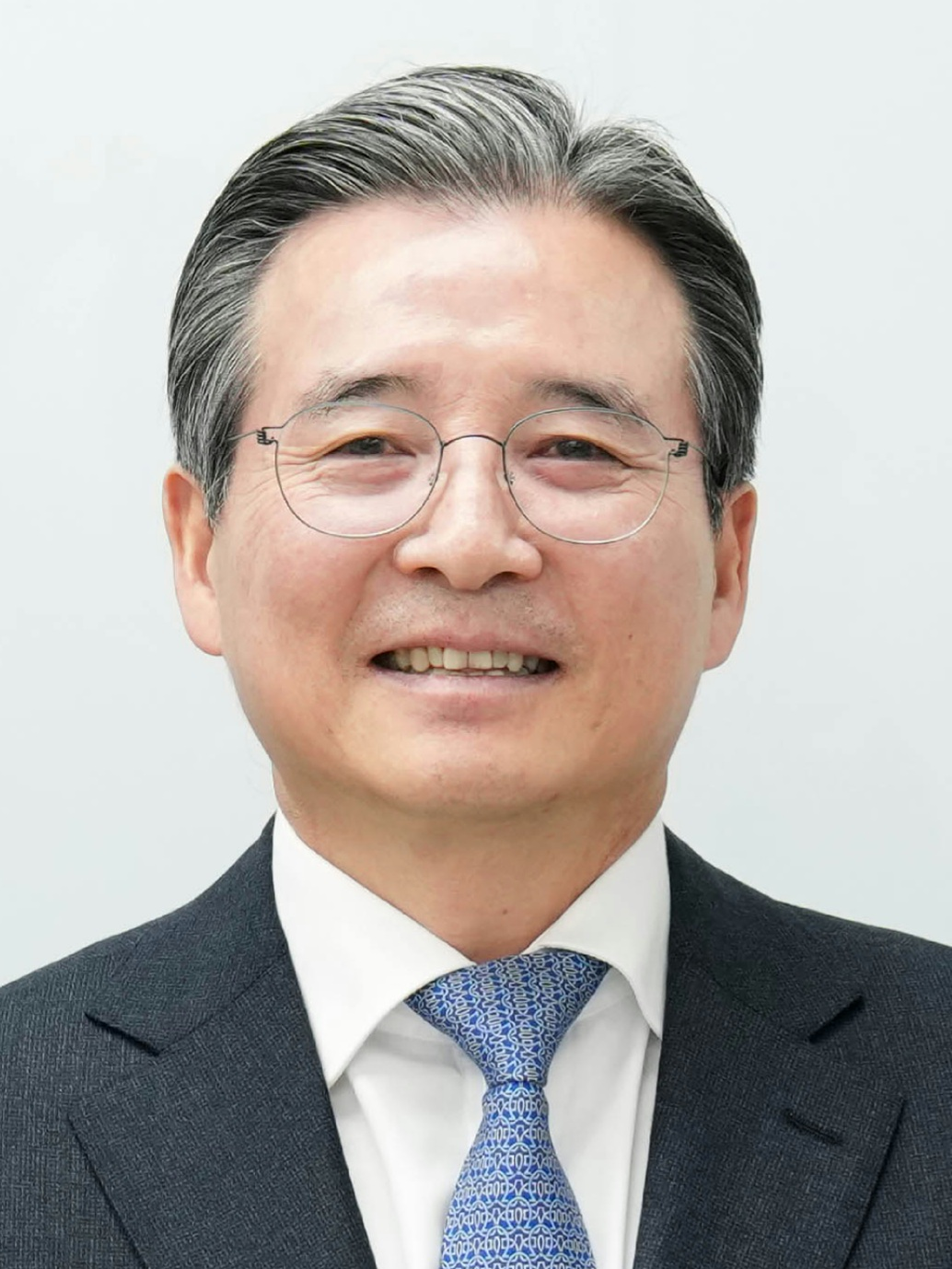
- Kim in 2025

Chief Presidential Secretary for Policy
- In office June 6, 2025 – November 1, 2026
- President: Lee Jae Myung

Vice Minister of Finance and Economy
- In office 2019–2021

Personal details
- Born: February 5, 1962 (age 64) Muan, South Korea
- Education: Seoul National University; George Washington University

Kim Yong-beom (born February 5, 1962) is a South Korean politician. Kim was the Chief Presidential Secretary for Policy and the Vice Minister of Finance and Economy.

== Early life ==
Kim was born on February 5, 1962, in Muan, South Korea. Kim graduated from Gwangju Daedong High School. He earned a bachelor's degree in economics and master's degree in public administration from Seoul National University, and a doctor of philosophy degree from George Washington University. He passed the civil service examination in 1986.

== Career ==
From 1987 to 1992, Kim was an administrative officer for the Ministry of Finance. In 1996, Kim became an administrative officer for the Ministry of Strategy and Finance. In 1999, Kim became a senior official for the Securities System Division of the Ministry of Finance. In 2000, Kim became a senior financial expert of the Financial Development Department of the World Bank. In 2004, Kim was moved to the Asia-Pacific Division of the same bank. In 2005, Kim became the Head of the Banking system Division of the Ministry of Finance and Economy.

In 2006, Kim became a senior officer of the Office of the President under the administration of president Roh Moo-hyun. In 2008, Kim became Director-General of the Presidential National Competitiveness Council. In 2009, Kim became the Director of the Insurance Division of the Korea Post Insurance Business Office of the Ministry of Knowledge Economy. In 2010, Kim became Director of the International Financial System Reform Bureau under the G20 Summit Preparatory Committee, and Secretary General of the Public Fund Management Committee.

In 2012, Kim became Director-General of the Capital Markets Bureau under the Financial Services Commission. In 2013, Kim became Director-General of the Financial Bureau under the Financial Services Commissions. In 2015, Kim became Standing Commissioner and Secretary-General of the Securities and Futures Commission. From 2017 to 2019, Kim was the Vice Chairman of the Financial Services Commission and Chairman of the Securities and Futures Commission. From 2019 to 2021, Kim was the Vice Minister of Finance and Economy. In 2021, Kim was a visiting research fellow of the Korea Financial Research Institute. In 2022, Kim became the chief executive officer of Hashed Open Research.

On June 6, 2025, Kim was appointed the Chief Presidential Secretary for Policy. Kim was the first Chief Presidential Secretary for Policy of president Lee Jae Myung's administration. During his time as Chief Presidential Secretary for Policy, Kim advocated for the introduction of high-risk single-stock leveraged exchange traded funds, which caused large losses for retail investors. On October 31, 2026, Kim offered his resignation to president Lee, which he accepted the next day.
