= Jeong Seong-ho =

South Korean politician

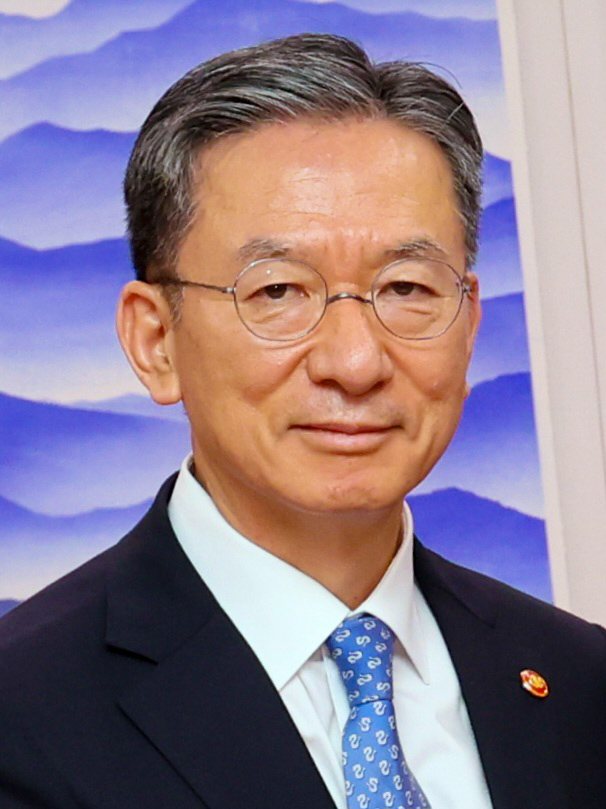
- Jeong in 2025

Minister of Justice
- In office 19 July 2025 – 24 August 2026
- President: Lee Jae Myung
- Prime Minister: Kim Min-seok; Han Seong-sook
- Preceded by: Park Sung-jae; Lee Jin-soo (acting)
- Succeeded by: Lee Jin-soo (acting)

Member of the National Assembly
- In office 30 May 2004 – 29 May 2008
- Preceded by: Mok Yo-sang (Dongducheon–Yangju, Gyeonggi)
- Succeeded by: Kim Seong-soo
- Constituency: Yangju–Dongducheon (Gyeonggi)
- In office 30 May 2012 – 29 May 2016
- Preceded by: Kim Seong-soo
- Succeeded by: Himself (Yangju, Gyeonggi); Kim Sung-won (Dongducheon–Yeoncheon, Gyeonggi)
- Constituency: Yangju–Dongducheon (Gyeonggi)
- In office 30 May 2016 – 29 May 2024
- Preceded by: Himself (Yangju–Dongducheon, Gyeonggi)
- Succeeded by: Himself (Dongducheon–Yangju–Yeoncheon A, Gyeonggi); Kim Sung-won (Dongducheon–Yangju–Yeoncheon B, Gyeonggi)
- Constituency: Yangju (Gyeonggi)
- Incumbent
- Assumed office 30 May 2024
- Preceded by: Himself (Yangju, Gyeonggi)
- Constituency: Dongducheon–Yangju–Yeoncheon A (Gyeonggi)

Personal details
- Party: Democratic Party of Korea

Jeong Seong-ho (Korean: 정성호) is a South Korean politician who served as the minister of justice from 2025 to 2026. A member of the Democratic Party of Korea (DPK), he was a member of the National Assembly from 2004 to 2025.

Jeong became a human rights attorney after passing the bar exam in 1986. He met Lee Jae Myung at the National Judicial Training Institute in 1987. Jeong was a founder of the Northern Gyeonggi Environmental Movement Alliance.

Jeong first participated in politics in 2000, and won a seat in the National Assembly in 2004 representing Yangju, Gyeonggi Province. During his time in the National Assembly, Jeong was a member of the Land, Infrastructure, and Transport Committee, the Parliamentary Legislation and Judicial Committee, and was the Democratic Party of Korea's Chief Spokesperson. Jeong became the Minister of Justice in June 2025.

In August 2026, he resigned as Minister due to poor health.

== Election results ==
Year	Elections	Constituency	Political party	Votes (%)	Results
2000	16th National Assembly General Election	Dongducheon–Yangju (Gyeonggi)	MDP	33,249 (44.38%)	Defeated (2nd)
2004	17th National Assembly General Election	Yangju–Dongducheon (Gyeonggi)	Uri	45,082 (49.34%)	Won
2008	18th National Assembly General Election	Yangju–Dongducheon (Gyeonggi)	UDP	41,822 (48.02%)	Defeated (2nd)
2012	19th National Assembly General Election	Yangju–Dongducheon (Gyeonggi)	DUP	60,016 (53.74%)	Won
2016	20th National Assembly General Election	Yangju (Gyeonggi)	Democratic	54,441 (61.39%)	Won
2020	21st National Assembly General Election	Yangju (Gyeonggi)	Democratic	69,905 (62.64%)	Won
2024	22nd National Assembly General Election	Dongducheon–Yangju–Yeoncheon A (Gyeonggi)	Democratic	82,186 (60.26%)	Won
