= Kang Sun-woo =

South Korean politician (born 1978)

- 강선우
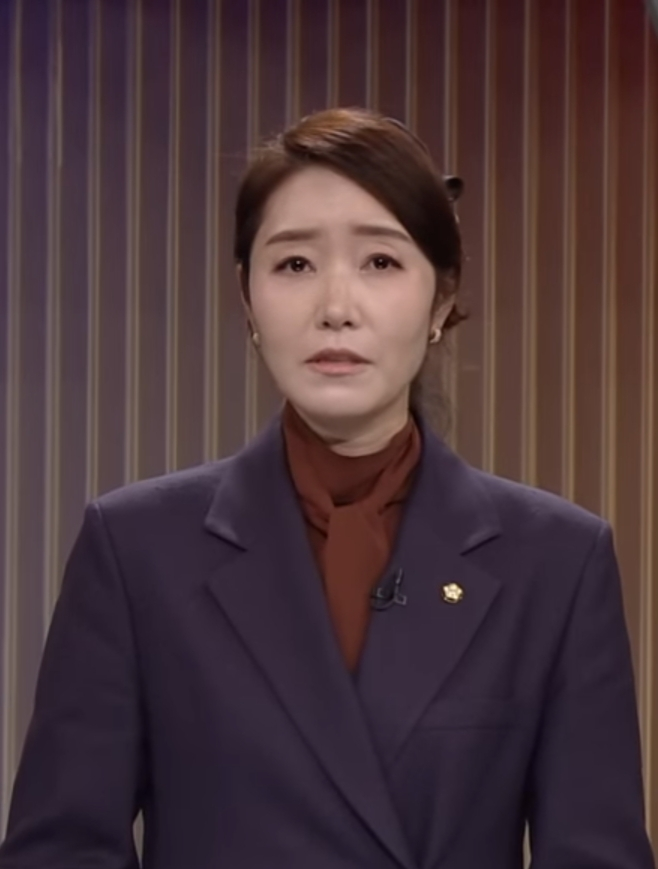

Member of the National Assembly
- Incumbent
- Assumed office 30 May 2020
- Preceded by: Keum Tae-sup
- Constituency: Seoul Gangseo A

Personal details
- Born: 2 June 1978 (age 48) Daegu, South Korea
- Party: Independent (since 2026)
- Other political affiliations: Democratic (until 2026)
- Education: Ewha Womans University (AB, MA); University of Wisconsin–Madison (PhD)

Korean name
- Hangul: 강선우
- Hanja: 姜仙祐
- RR: Gang Seonu
- MR: Kang Sŏnu

Kang Sun-woo (Korean: 강선우; born 2 June 1978) is a South Korean politician.

== Early life and education ==
She earned her Bachelor's in English education and master's degree in consumer studies and human development from Ewha Womans University. She received her doctorate degree in human development and family studies from University of Wisconsin–Madison where she worked as an instructor from 2010 to 2012. She continued to teach as an assistant professor at South Dakota State University from 2012 to 2016.

== Career ==
In 2016 she joined the Democratic Party and ran for 2016 general election as the number 29 on the list for proportional representation. From 2016 to 2017 she worked as a standing deputy spokesperson of her party. She worked at then-candidate Moon Jae-in's presidential campaign in 2017. She also participated in various policy advisory instruments of Moon government such as National Education Council, National Unification Advisory Council and Presidential Committee for Balanced National Development.

In 2020 she earned the party nomination for Gangseo district for the 21st general election defeating the incumbent parliamentarian Geum Tae-sub by a significant margin. In the election, she defeated the former parliamentarian and diplomat Ku Sang-chan from the main opposition party.

In August 2020, the newly elected leader of her party, Lee Nak-yon, appointed her as one of three standing spokesperson of the party.

== Minister of Gender Equality and Family ==
On 23 June 2025 South Korea, South Korean President Lee Jae Myung nominated Kang to serve in his government as Minister of Gender Equality and Family. On 14 July 2025, Kang's scrutiny hearing for this nomination was held at the South Korean National Assembly.

On 23 July, Kang resigned as the nominee of the Minister of Gender Equality and Family.

== Electoral history ==
Election	Year	District	Party affiliation	Votes	Percentage of votes	Results
20th National Assembly General Election	2016	Proportional representation (29th)	Democratic Party	6,069,744	25.54%	Lost
21st National Assembly General Election	2020	Seoul Gangseo A	Democratic Party	63,397	55.89%	Won
22nf National Assembly General Election	2024	Seoul Gangseo A	Democratic Party	64,651	58.55%	Won
