= Kim Sang-jo =

South Korean professor of international trade and policy aide

- 김상조

Chief Presidential Secretary for Policy
- In office 21 June 2019 – 29 March 2021
- President: Moon Jae-in
- Preceded by: Kim Soo-hyun
- Succeeded by: Lee Ho-seung

Chairperson of Fair Trade Commission
- In office 13 June 2017 – 21 June 2019
- President: Moon Jae-in
- Prime Minister: Lee Nak-yon
- Preceded by: Chung Jae-chan
- Succeeded by: Joh Sung-wook

Personal details
- Born: 21 November 1962 (age 63) now-Gumi, South Korea
- Education: Seoul National University

Kim Sang-jo (Korean: 김상조; Hanja: 金尙祚; born 21 November 1962) is a South Korean professor of international trade at Hansung University who served as the top policy aide to President Moon Jae-in and as his first Chairperson of Fair Trade Commission (KFTC).

== Career ==
=== Civil societies ===
Before entering politics, Kim had been very active in civil societies particularly in relation to issues of reforming Chaebol. From 1994 to 2001 he led People's Solidarity for Participatory Democracy (PSPD) and the Chaebol Reform Watchdog and from 1999 to 2001 its Economic Democratization Committee. From 2001 to 2006 he then led its Center for Economic Reform. He continued to lead its Center until 2017 after it became independent from PSPD and changed its name to Solidarity For Economic Reform in 2006. He also led PSPD's Financial Research Centre of Korea from 2015 to 2017.

=== Government roles and political career ===
He also took several governmental positions as a scholar. He was previously an advisor on competition policy to KFTC from 2003 to 2005. Additionally, he was a member of now-Economic, Social and Labor Council from 1997 to 1998 and of the Financial Development Review Committee, an advisory board to now-Ministry of Economy and Finance, from 2000 to 2001.

Furthermore, Kim joined Moon Jae-in's 2017 presidential campaign as a vice-chair of its New Korea Committee, which formulated Moon's economic visions as its think tank. President Moon nominated and appointed Kim as his anti-trust agency chief upon the beginning of his presidency. During his tenure as the head of KFTC, the organisation solidified its position as a pivotal entity in materialising a Moon's economic vision of "fair economy." In the middle of his fixed, three year term, Kim was reshuffled to be President Moon's top policy aide. On 30 December 2020, President Moon's chief of staff, Noh Young-min, and Kim offered their resignations to Moon. Whilst Noh was replaced by You Young-min, Kim was not due to abundant policy initiatives facing including the third COVID-19 relief package and the virus containment. This makes Kim one of four people who have continued to serve President Moon as cabinet minister or ministerial-level government official since the beginning of Moon's presidency in 2017 along with Hong Nam-ki, Suh Hoon and Kang Kyung-wha as of December 2020.

=== Teaching and academia ===
In 1994 Kim received full tenure at Hansung University and before becoming the head of Fair Trade Commission, he had taught at its Department of International Trade which he previously led as its Dean from 2013 to 2015. When his class was cancelled due to his nomination hearing for KFTC Chairmanship, he held a supplementary lecture on a following day.

Moreover, he is a board member of the Korean Economic Association which he previously assumed from 2009 to 2011. He was a board member of Korea Monetary and Finance Association from 2014 to 2015 and its vice-chairman from 2015 to 2016. Kim was also a visiting scholar at University of Cambridge and University of California, San Diego as well as Yale World Fellow.

== Education ==
Kim earned three degrees in economics from Seoul National University from bachelor in 1985 to master in 1987 and doctorate in 1993.
