= Cheong Inkyo =

South Korean politician and professor

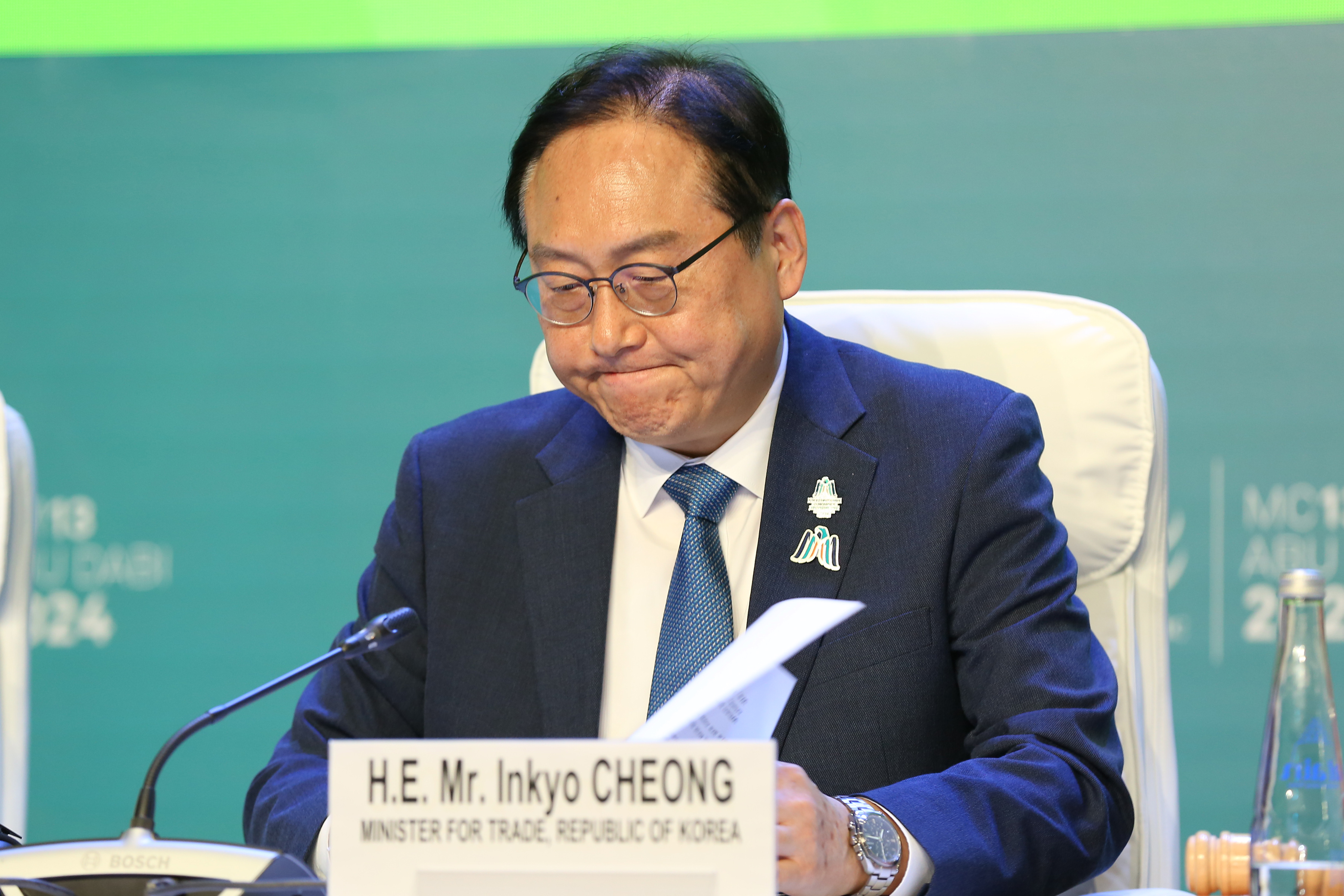
- Cheong in 2024

Minister of Trade
- In office January 10, 2024 – July 10, 2025

Personal details
- Education: Michigan State University

Cheong Inkyo (Korean: 정인교) is a South Korean politician and professor. Cheong was the Minister of Trade.

== Biography ==
Cheong gained his doctoral degree in economics from Michigan State University. Cheong was a professor of trade policies and economic security at Inha University.

Cheong has advised the finance, industry, and foreign ministries. In January 2024, Cheong became the Minister of Trade. Cheong chaired a meeting of Asia-Pacific Economic Cooperation. In May 2025, Cheong and Industry Minister Ahn Duk-geun met with US Trade Representative Jamieson Greer for trade talks.
