= Lee Jeong-sik (politician) =

South Korean politician and businessman

9th Minister of Employment and Labor
- In office May 10, 2022 – August 29, 2024

Personal details
- Education: Soongsil University; Seoul National University

Lee Jeong-sik (Korean: 이정식) is a South Korean politician and businessman. Lee is an independent director of Samsung Construction and Trading Corporation. Lee was the 9th Minister of Employment and Labor, CEO of the Korea Labor and Employment Service, and General Secretary of Federation of Korean Trade Unions.

== Early life ==
In 2012, Lee earned a doctorate from Soongsil University´s business school. Lee also graduated from Seoul National University.

== Career ==
In 1986, Lee joined the Federation of Korean Trade Unions. From January to February 1998, Lee was a member of the Sub-Committee on Relations Between Employers and Employed of the Economic and Social Development Commission. From June 2000 to May 2004, Lee was Division Director of External Cooperation Bureau in the Federation of Korean Trade Unions. From November 2004 to December 2006, Lee was a policy advisor to the Ministry of Land, Infrastructure and Transport.

From March 2011 to February 2013, Lee was the First Deputy General Securities & Division Director of Policy Bureau of the Federation of Korean Trade Unions. From April 2011 to May 2017, he was a member of the Minimum Wage Commission. From March 2013 to February 2014, Lee was President of Central Research Center of the Federation of Korean Trade Unions. From March 2014 to January 2017, Lee was the General Secretary of Federation of Korean Trade Unions. From April 2017 to April 2020, Lee was the CEO of the Korea Labor and Employment Service. From 2020 to 2022, Lee was an advisor on labor affairs to Samsung Electronics. From March 2021 to April 2022, Lee was a visiting professor of Korea University of Technology and Education.

On May 10, 2022, Lee became the 9th Minister of Employment and Labor. During his nomination, Lee admitted to accidentally falsifying his career history due to him relying on his memory for the history. In March 2026, the Samsung Construction and Trading Corporation appointed Lee as an independent director. The National Pension Service voted against Lee´s appointment.
