= Choi Dong-seok =

South Korean politician

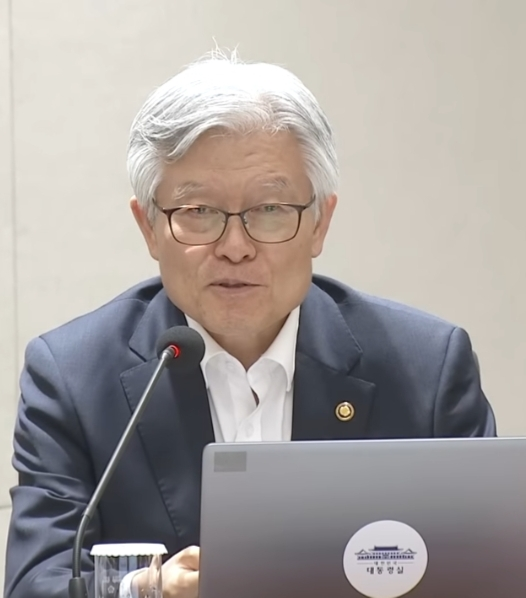
- Choi in 2025

Minister of Personnel Management
- Incumbent
- Assumed office July 20, 2025
- President: Lee Jae Myung

Personal details
- Born: Wonju; 1956 (age 69–70)
- Education: Sungkyunkwan University; Justus Liebig University Giessen

Choi Dong-seok (born 1956) is a South Korean politician. Choi is the Minister of Personnel Management.

== Early life ==
Choi was born in 1956 in Wonju. Choi graduated from Chunchon High School in 1974. Choi earned a Bachelor's degree in business administration from Sungkyunkwan University, and a Master's and Doctor of Philosophy degree in business administration from Justus Liebig University Giessen.

== Career ==
In 1997, Choi wrote a book entitled "The Foolish Actions of Smart People", in which he stated his view on bureaucratic organizations and systematic personnel systems. In 1998, Choi became the Head of Personnel and Organization Reform Team for the Bank of Korea. The next year, Choi became the Government Job Analysis Policy Advisor for the Civil Service Commission. Choi was an advisor to the governor of the Bank of Korea. In 2003, Choi became Vice-President of Human Resources and Organization for Kyobo Life Insurance. In 2022, Choi became head of the Tschoe Dongseok Institute for Personnel and Organization Studies. Choi was a consultant to the Ministry of Interior and the Ministry of Foreign Affairs. Choi was the chief executive officer of Samil. Until his appointment as Minister of Personnel Management, Choi was the founder and head of the Choi Dong-seok Personnel and Organization Research Institute.

On July 20, 2025, Choi became the Minister of Personnel Management. 2 days later, Choi deleted his YouTube channel after his past comments he made on it were seen as controversial. The same day as he deleted his YouTube channel, he publicly apologized for his comments. Choi's comments criticized president Moon Jae-in, Cho Kuk, and Kim Jae-ryun, who represented the person who accused Park Won-soon of sexual harassment in court. In one comment that he made to the media on July 28, 2020, Choi stated, in regard to the Park Won-soon case, that it is common for a perpetrator to become a victim, and that the sexual harassment case looked like it was planned. Choi also apologized at a cabinet meeting of Lee Jae Myung on July 29, 2025.
