= Lee Eog-weon =

South Korean politician (born 1967)

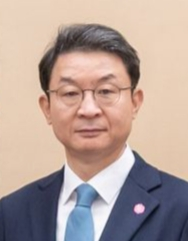
- Lee in 2025

Chairman of the Financial Services Commission
- Incumbent
- Assumed office September 2025
- President: Lee Jae Myung

Vice Minister of Economy and Finance
- In office 2021 – May 2022

Chairman of the World Trade Organization Working Party on Domestic Regulation
- In office 2015–2016

Personal details
- Born: June 8, 1967 (age 59) Seoul, South Korea
- Education: Seoul National University (bachelor's); University of Missouri (Ph.D)

Lee Eog-weon (Korean: 이억원; born June 8, 1967) is a South Korean politician. Lee is the chairman of the Financial Service Commission, and he was the Vice Minister of Economy and Finance and Chairman of the World Trade Organization Working Party on Domestic Regulation.

== Biography ==
Lee was born on June 8, 1967 in Seoul. He obtained a bachelor's degree in economics from Seoul National University and a Ph.D. in economics from the University of Missouri.

Lee has held several director positions at the Ministry of Economy and Finance. He was a Minister-Counselor at the Korean Permanent Mission to the UN. From 2015 to 2016, Lee was chairman of the World Trade Organization Working Party on Domestic Regulation. Lee was the first Korean to be chairman of the Working Party on Domestic Regulation.

From 2020 to 2021, Lee was the Secretary for Economic Policy at the Presidential Policy Office. From 2021 to May 2022, Lee was the Vice Minister of Economy and Finance. In August 2025, Lee was nominated to become the Chairman of the Financial Services Commission. The Lee administration is attempting to weaken the commission by transferring the commission's financial policy functions to the Ministry of Economy and Finance.
