= Chae Hwi-young =

South Korean businessman and journalist (born 1964)

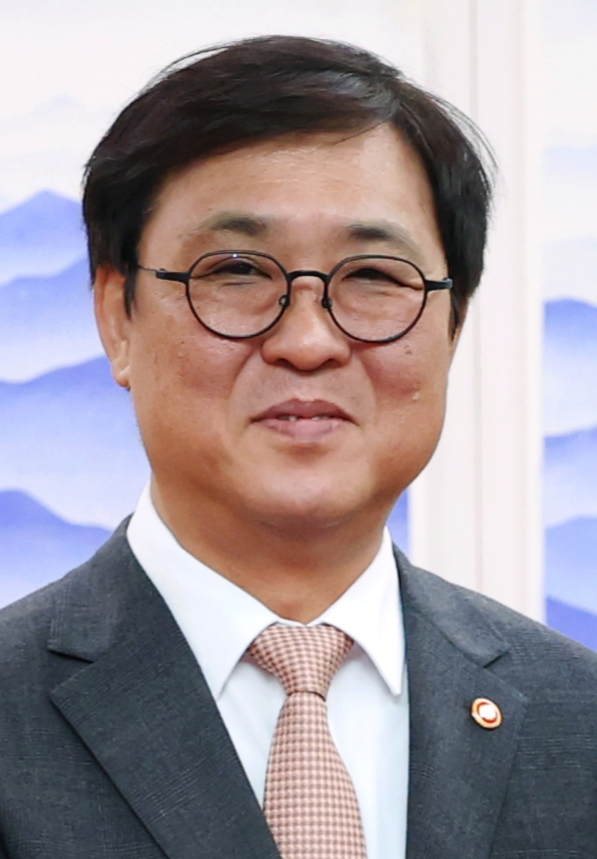
Chae Hwi-Young in 2025

Chae Hwi-young (Korean: 최휘영; born 29 April 1964) is a South Korean businessman and journalist who has served as the minister of culture, sports and tourism since 2025.

== Life and career ==
Chae Hwi-young was born 29 April 1964 in Busan. In 2005/2006 he was the Co-CEO of NHN. He is currently serving as the 55th Minister of Culture, Sports and Tourism. He represented South Korea during the 2026 Winter Olympics opening ceremony.
