= Ha Joon-kyung =

South Korean politician

- Ha in 2026

Chief Presidential Secretary for Policy
- Incumbent
- Assumed office October 1, 2026

Personal details
- Born: 1969 (age 56–57) Jeonju, South Korea
- Education: Seoul National University; Brown University

Ha Joon-kyung (Korean: 하준경; born 1969) is a South Korean politician. Ha is the Chief Presidential Secretary for Policy, and was the Senior Presidential Secretary for Economic Growth.

== Biography ==
Ha was born in Jeonju, South Korea in 1969. He graduated from Jungang High School. Ha earned a bachelor's degree and master's degree in economics from Seoul National University, and a doctorate in economics from Brown University. The topic of his master's degree thesis was the lender of last resort.

In 1993, he became employed by the Bank of Korea. In 2000, Ha became a teaching fellow for Brown University. In 2003, he became a manager for the Bank of Korea Institute for Monetary and Economic Research, and a part-timer lecturer of economics for Dongguk University. In 2005, Ha became a research fellow for the Korea Institute of Finance. In 2008, Ha became employed by the Hanyang University Education Research Industry Cluster at Ansan campus. In the same year, he became a guest editorial writer for The Dong-A Ilbo. In 2013, Ha was awarded the Best Paper Award from the Korea Money and Finance Association. He also won the IBK Academic Award from the Korean Association of Small Business Studies.

In 2019, Ha was appointed to the Macroeconomy Subcommittee of the National Economic Advisory Council. In 2021, Ha became Chair of the Transformational Fair Growth Strategy Committee of the Democratic Party of Korea Central Election Campaign Committee for the 20th Presidential Election.

In June 2025, Ha became Senior Presidential Secretary for Economic Growth for the Office of the President. On October 1, 2026, president Lee Jae Myung appointed Ha as his Chief Presidential Secretary for Policy after Kim Yong-bum resigned. The then-Vice Minister of Trade, industry and Resources, Moon Shin-hak, replaced Ha as Presidential Secretary for Economic Growth. In November 2026, Ha announced that South Korea and China had finished negotiations to update their free trade agreement. In the same month, Ha presided over an emergency meeting in regard to an artificial intelligence cheating on national examinations scandal.
