= Jo Won-cheol =

South Korean politician

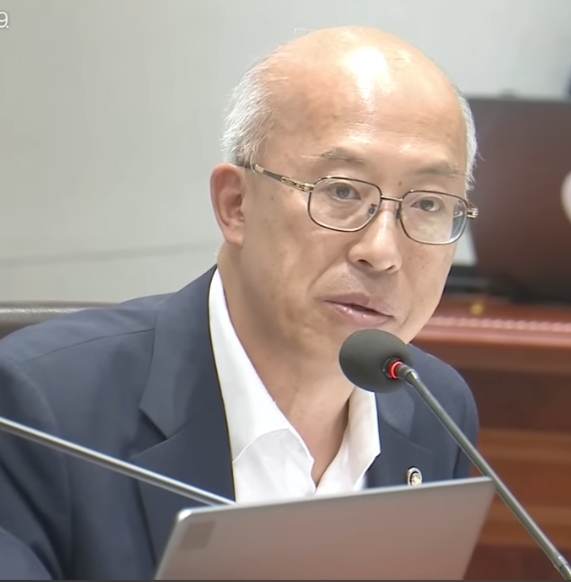
- Jo in 2025

Minister of Government Legislation
- Incumbent
- Assumed office October 24, 2025
- President: Lee Jae Myung

Personal details
- Born: 1962 (age 63–64) Seoul, South Korea
- Education: Seoul National University

Jo Won-cheol (born 1962) is a South Korean politician. He is the Minister of Government Legislation.

== Early life ==
Jo was born in 1962 in Seoul. In 1980, Jo graduated from Kwanak High School. In 1985, he earned a Bachelor of Arts degree in Public Law from Seoul National University. He passed the 26th National Judiciary Examination in 1984, and graduated from the Judicial Research and Training Institute in 1989.

== Career ==
In 1989, Jo became a judge in the Daeju District Court. In 1997, Jo became a judge of the Seoul District Court. In 2001, he became a judge of the Seoul High Court. In 2002, he became a research judge for the Supreme Court of Korea. In 2006, he became presiding judge of the Suwon District Court. In 2008, he became presiding judge of the Seoul Central District Court. in 2011, Jo became Chief Presiding Judge of the Western Branch of the Seoul District Court. In 2012, Jo became Chief Judge of the Goyang Branch Court of Uijeongbu District Court. Jo was the defense attorney for Lee Jae Myung when he was accused of corruption.

On July 13, 2025, Jo was appointed Minister of Government Legislation. On October 24, 2025, in response to a question by representative Song Seok-jun about the 5 trials against president Lee, Jo stated that Lee was innocent. The Korea JoongAng Daily criticized Jo's comment because of the Ministry of Government Legislation's role in interpreting laws. In response to the comment, the People Power Party demanded Jo's resignation. On October 27, 2025, Citizens' Livelihood Countermeasures Committee filed a complaint with the Seoul Metropolitan Police Agency, in which they accused Jo of abuse of power and defamation because of his comment and that another comment he made ignored Article 128, Paragraph 2 of the constitution, which states that changing a president's term does not apply to the incumbent. On the same day, the People Power Party called for an impeachment motion because of his comment.
