= Park Sung-jae =

South Korean lawyer and politician

Minister of Justice
- In office 20 February 2024 – 4 June 2025
- President: Yoon Suk Yeol
- Prime Minister: Han Duck-soo
- Preceded by: Han Dong-hoon; Shim Woo-woo (acting)
- Succeeded by: Jeong Seong-ho

Personal details
- Born: Cheongdo County, North Gyeongsang Province, South Korea
- Party: Independent
- Criminal information
- Movement: 2024 martial law
- Status: Imprisoned
- Convictions: Playing a key role in an insurrection; Abuse of power
- Penalty: 25 years imprisonment

Details
- Date apprehended: 22 June 2026

Korean name
- Hangul: 박성재
- Hanja: 朴性載
- RR: Bak Seongjae
- MR: Pak Sŏngjae

Park Sung-jae (Korean: 박성재) is a South Korean lawyer and politician. An independent, he served as the minister of justice of South Korea from 2024 to 2025.

On 12 December 2024, the National Assembly passed impeachment motions against Park and KNP Commissioner Cho Ji-ho, accusing them of their alleged roles in the controversial declaration of emergency martial law by President Yoon Suk Yeol. The passed impeachment motions led to Park and Cho being suspended immediately from their office duties.

Preparatory hearings on whether to uphold or lift Park's removal were held by the Constitutional Court of Korea beginning on 24 February 2025. On 10 April, the court dismissed the impeachment motion in an 8-0 vote, thereby reinstating him immediately.

After Lee Jae-myung was sworn in as president of South Korea on 4 June 2025, the entirety of Yoon's cabinet expressed their will of resignation. Lee refused the resignations except for Park's.

== Role in martial law ==
On 22 June 2026, Park was found guilty of playing a key role in an insurrection and abusing his power by calling a meeting of senior ministry officials following Yoon's declaration of martial law, to review dispatching prosecutors to the martial law command, checking the capacity of correctional facilities, allegedly to hold politicians and key figures expected to be arrested under the martial law, and order ministry officials in charge of imposing travel bans to report for work. He was sentenced to 25 years in prison and taken to custody immediately after the verdict.
