= Ju Biung-ghi =

South Korean politician (born 1969)

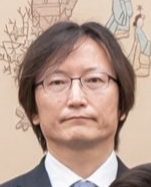
- Ju in 2025

Chairman of the Fair Trade Commission
- Incumbent
- Assumed office September 2025
- President: Lee Jae Myung

Personal details
- Born: August 6, 1969 (age 57) Jeongeup, South Korea
- Education: Seoul National University; University of Rochester

Ju Biung-ghi (Korean: 주병기; born 1969) is a South Korean politician. He is currently the chairman of the Fair Trade Commission.

== Biography ==
Ju was born on August 6, 1969, in Jeongeup. He obtained bachelor's and master's degrees in economics from Seoul National University and a Ph.D. in economics from the University of Rochester.

Ju was a professor of economics at Seoul National University. From April 2018 to February 2019, Ju was on the Special Committee on Fiscal Reform within the Presidential Commission on Policy Planning. From April 2018 to April 2019, Ju was president of the Korea Applied Economics Association. In August 2025, Ju was nominated to become the chairman of the Fair Trade Commission.
