= Oh Yoo-kyung =

South Korean politician and academic

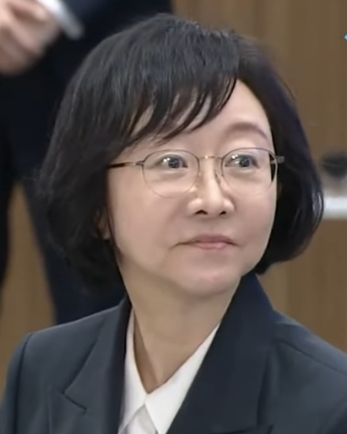
- Oh in 2025

Minister of Food and Drug Safety
- Incumbent
- Assumed office May 27, 2022

Personal details
- Education: Seoul National University; University of New York at Buffalo

Oh Yoo-kyung is a South Korean politician and academic. She is the Minister of Food and Drug Safety. Oh was a professor and dean of Seoul National University´s College of Pharmacy.

== Early life and academia ==
Oh earned a Bachelor of Pharmacy and a Master of Pharmacy from Seoul National University and a Ph.D. in Pharmacy from the University of New York in Buffalo. She had post doctoral training at the Harvard Medical School. She was a researcher at the Harvard Medical School.

Oh was a professor at Seoul National University. She was also the university´s dean of their College of Pharmacy. She was the first female dean in the college´s history.

At Seoul National University, her fields of research were nanomedicine manufacturing technologies, bio-drug delivery systems of nucleic acid, vaccine formulation,and stimulus-guided delivery systems. In 2014, she became a fellow of the Korean Academy of Science and Technology. She has been granted 26 patents and published 220 scientific papers.

== Politics ==
On May 26, 2022, Oh was nominated to become the Minister of Food and Drug Safety by then-president Yoon Suk-yeol. She became the 7th Minister of Food and Drug Safety on May 27, 2022. Her inauguration was held in Cheongju. In 2022, Oh stated that safety and quality are what make Korean food products competitive.

In 2024, the Ministry of Food and Drug Safety was praised in the 2024 Government Performance Evaluation, which was run by the Office for Government Policy Coordination. The recognition was due to the ministry´s work for small business owners, vulnerable groups, and to create future growth. Additionally, the ministry was praised for its programs to eliminate interagency silos. The Korea Post also noted the ministry´s programs allowing person-to-person transactions of healthy foods. Oh was retained by president Lee Jae-myung, which was the second retention in his cabinet. She is currently the longest serving Minister of Food and Drug Safety in South Korean history.
