= Ministry of Planning and Budget (South Korea) =

Federal ministry in South Korea

Ministry of Planning and Budget Republic of Korea
- 기획예산처

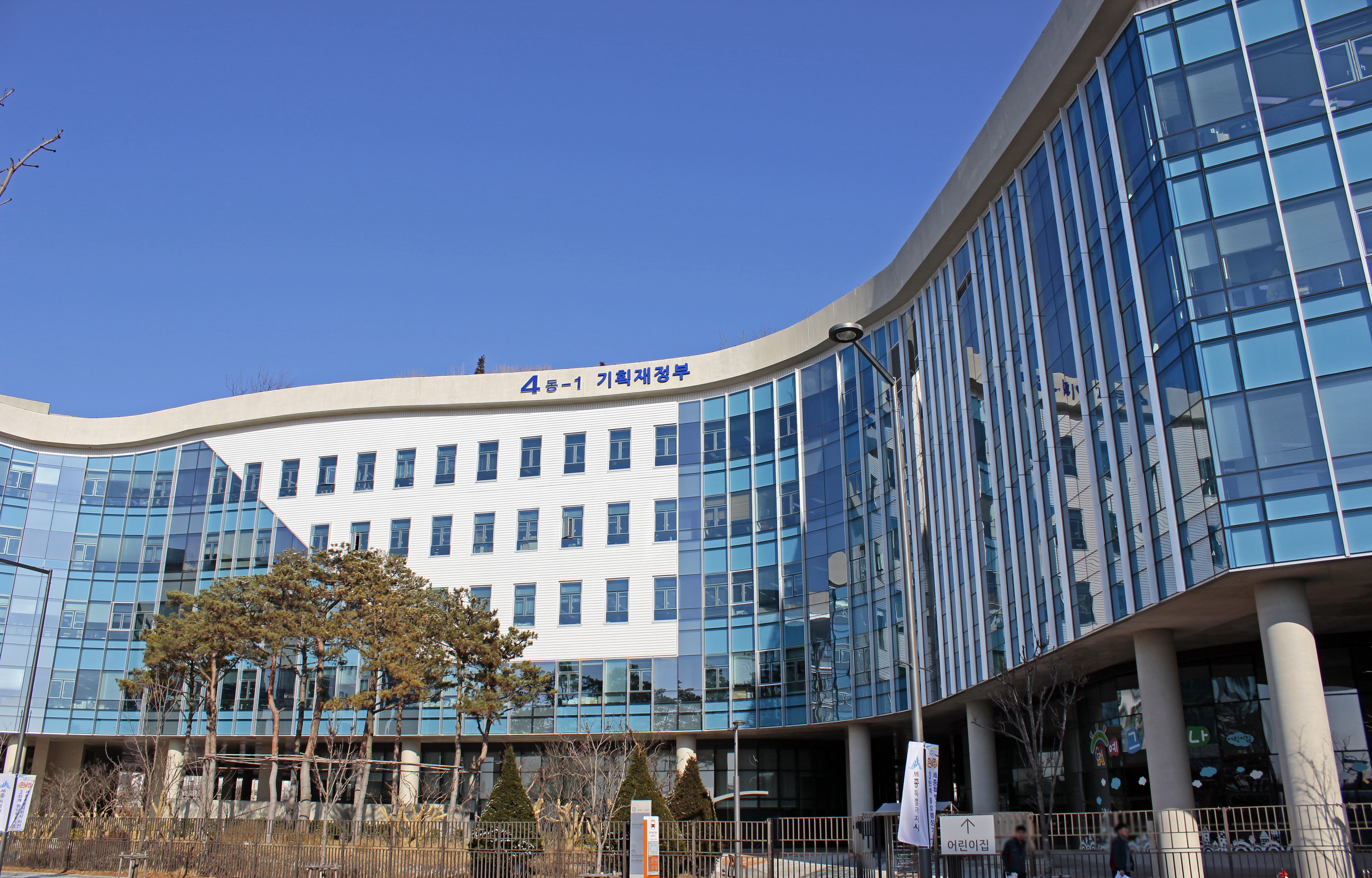
- MPB headquarters in Sejong

Agency overview
- Formed: February 29, 2008
- Preceding agencies: Ministry of Finance (1948–1994); Ministry of Finance and Economy (1994–2008); Ministry of Planning and Budget (1999–2008); Ministry of Strategy and Finance (2008–2018)
- Jurisdiction: Government of South Korea
- Headquarters: Government Complex-Sejong, 477, Galmae-ro, Sejong-si 30109, South Korea
- Minister responsible: Park Hong-keun, Minister
- Deputy Minister responsible: Lim Ki Keun, 1st Vice Minister (in charge to The Korea Lottery Committee)
- Child agency: The Korea Lottery Commission
- Website: english.mbp.go.kr

Korean name
- Hangul: 기획예산처
- Hanja: 企劃豫算處
- RR: Gihoek yesancheo
- MR: Kihoek yesanch'ŏ

The Ministry of Planning and Budget (Korean: 기획예산처) of South Korea formulates national development plans, preparing the annual budget, allocating public funds, and conducting fiscal management.

== History ==
- 1999: Opening of the Ministry of Planning and Budget
- 2008: Emerged to Ministry of Economy and Finance
- 2026: Separated from the Ministry of Economy and Finance

== Logo ==
1948–1999

1999–2008

2026–present

== Head of the organization ==
No	Name	Inauguration	Retirement	Cabinet
Ministry of Planning and Budget (1999–2008)
1	Jin Nyum	May 24, 1999	August 6, 2000	Kim Dae-jung administration
2	Jeon Yun-churl	August 7, 2000	January 28, 2002	Kim Dae-jung administration
3	Jang Seung-woo	January 29, 2002	February 26, 2003	Kim Dae-jung administration
4	Park Bong-heum	February 27, 2003	January 1, 2004	Roh Moo-hyun administration
5	Kim Byung-il	January 2, 2004	January 27, 2005	Roh Moo-hyun administration
6	Byun Yang-gyeun	January 28, 2005	July 3, 2006	Roh Moo-hyun administration
7	Jang Byung-wan	July 21, 2006	February 4, 2008	Roh Moo-hyun administration
Ministry of Planning and Budget (2026–)
1	Park Hong-keun	March 25, 2026	present	Lee Jae Myung administration
