= Park Hong-keun =

South Korean politician

- 박홍근
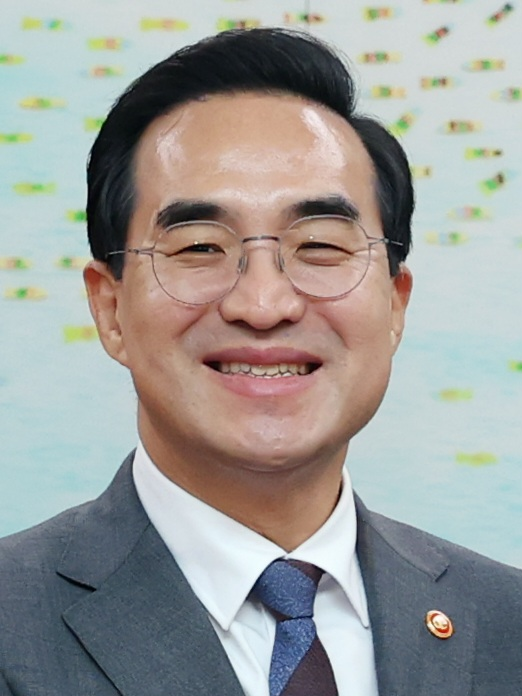

Minister of Planning and Budget
- Incumbent
- Assumed office 24 March 2026
- President: Lee Jae Myung
- Prime Minister: Kim Min-seok; Han Seong-sook
- Preceded by: Office established

Member of the National Assembly
- Incumbent
- Assumed office 30 May 2012
- Preceded by: Jin Seong-ho
- Constituency: Seoul Jungnang B

Leader of the Democratic Party
- Interim
- In office 2 June 2022 – 7 June 2022
- Preceded by: Yun Ho-jung and Park Ji-hyun (ERC)
- Succeeded by: Woo Sang-ho (interim)

Floor Leader of the Democratic Party
- In office 24 March 2022 – 28 April 2023
- Preceded by: Yun Ho-jung
- Succeeded by: Park Kwang-on

Personal details
- Born: 8 October 1969 (age 57) Goheung, South Jeolla, South Korea
- Party: Democratic
- Education: Kyung Hee University (BS, MPA)
- Website: www.maumgil.net

- Park Hong-keun
- Hangul: 박홍근
- Hanja: 朴洪根
- RR: Bak Honggeun
- MR: Pak Honggŭn

Park Hong-keun (Korean: 박홍근; Hanja: 朴洪根; born 8 October 1969) is a South Korean politician who has served as the minister of planning and budget since 2026. A member of the Democratic Party of Korea (DPK), he has also been a member of the National Assembly for Jungnang B, Seoul, since 2012.

Originally elected to the Assembly in the Jungnang B constituency by a margin of 854 votes—0.9 percent—over his Saenuri Party competitor, Kang Dong-ho, in the 2016 election he faced off another challenge from Kang, defeating him by a margin of 7.6 percent.

Supporting Chung Dong-young's bid in the 2007 presidential election, Park chaired the United New Democratic Party's Youth Campaign that year. He entered the Assembly in 2012. In September 2012, he submitted a legislative amendment allowing the government to rescind the licenses of businesses refusing to abide by local ordinances.

In 2013, Park attacked the Park Geun-hye government for abetting, as he saw it, Japan's resumption of a right to collective self-defense under Shinzō Abe. Subsequently, in the context of the controversy over the Chinese Air Defense Identification Zone in the East China Sea, in December that year he noted the importance of Socotra Rock, an underwater reef disputed by South Korea and China. He stated that only two thirds of the middle- and high-school textbooks he had analyzed mentioned the reef, and called for textbooks to be revised to include information on it.

Park received his undergraduate degree in Korean language at literature from Kyung Hee University, and went on to take a master's degree in public administration there. He was subsequently active in a number of civic groups, serving as co-president of the Korea Youth Corps and director of Volunteering Korea.

== Electoral history ==
Election	Year	District	Party affiliation	Votes	Percentage of votes	Results
19th National Assembly General Election	2012	Seoul Jungnang B	Democratic United Party	44,212	44.50%	Won
20th National Assembly General Election	2016	Seoul Jungnang B	Democratic Party	49,620	44.29%	Won
21st National Assembly General Election	2020	Seoul Jungnang B	Democratic Party	74,131	59.28%	Won
22nd National Assembly General Election	2024	Seoul Jungnang B	Democratic Party	73,600	57.72%	Won
