= Chief Presidential Secretary for Policy =

2003–2022 South Korean minister position

Chief Presidential Secretary for Policy of the Republic of Korea
- 대통령비서실 정책실장
- Emblem of South Korea

- Incumbent; Ha Joon-kyung since 1 October 2026
- Appointer: President of South Korea
- Term length: No fixed term
- Inaugural holder: Lee Jung-woo
- Formation: 25 March 2003; 23 years ago

The Chief Presidential Secretary for Policy (Korean: 대통령비서실 정책실장; Hanja: 大統領祕書室 政策室長) is a ministerial level position at the Office of President appointed by the President of South Korea.

President Roh first created this post. The succeeding president Lee changed its status to the vice-ministerial level. President Moon returned this post to a ministerial-level position which was abolished under Park's administration. Moon's successor Yoon abolished the post following his promise to reduce the size of the presidential secretariat. However, Yoon revived this post in order to strengthen policy coordination.

== List of presidential secretaries for policy ==
No.	Name	Term of office			President
No.	Name	Took office	Left office	Time in office	President
1	Lee Jung-woo	25 February 2003	31 December 2003	309 days	Roh Moo-hyun
2	Park Bong-heum	1 January 2004	13 June 2004	164 days	Roh Moo-hyun
3	Kim Byong-joon	14 June 2004	31 May 2006	1 year, 351 days	Roh Moo-hyun
4	Kwon Oh-kyu	1 June 2006	3 July 2006	32 days	Roh Moo-hyun
5	Byun Yang-gyun	4 July 2006	10 September 2007	1 year, 68 days	Roh Moo-hyun
6	Sung Gyung-ryung	21 September 2007	24 February 2008	156 days	Roh Moo-hyun
Office not in use		2008–2009		1 year, 187 days	Lee Myung-bak
7	Yoon Jin-sik	1 September 2009	25 May 2010	266 days	Lee Myung-bak
8	Paek Yong-ho	16 July 2010	12 December 2011	1 year, 149 days	Lee Myung-bak
9	Kim Dae-gi	13 August 2012	24 February 2013	195 days	Lee Myung-bak
Office not in use		2013–2017		4 years, 84 days	Park Geun-hye
10	Jang Ha-sung	21 May 2017	9 November 2018	1 year, 172 days	Moon Jae-in
11	Kim Soo-hyun	10 November 2018	21 June 2019	223 days	Moon Jae-in
12	Kim Sang-jo	21 June 2019	29 March 2021	1 year, 281 days	Moon Jae-in
13	Lee Ho-seung	29 March 2021	9 May 2022	1 year, 41 days	Moon Jae-in
Office not in use		2022–2023		1 year, 209 days	Yoon Suk Yeol
Lee Kwan-sub		4 December 2023	31 December 2023	27 days	Yoon Suk Yeol
Sung Tae-yoon		1 January 2024	30 May 2025	1 year, 149 days	Yoon Suk Yeol
Kim Yong-beom		6 June 2025	Incumbent		Lee Jae Myung

== See also ==
- Office of the President (South Korea)
- Chief of Staff to the President (South Korea)
- Senior Presidential Secretary
- President of South Korea
- Government of South Korea
- Politics of South Korea
