= Ministry of Government Legislation =

Government ministry of South Korea

- 법제처

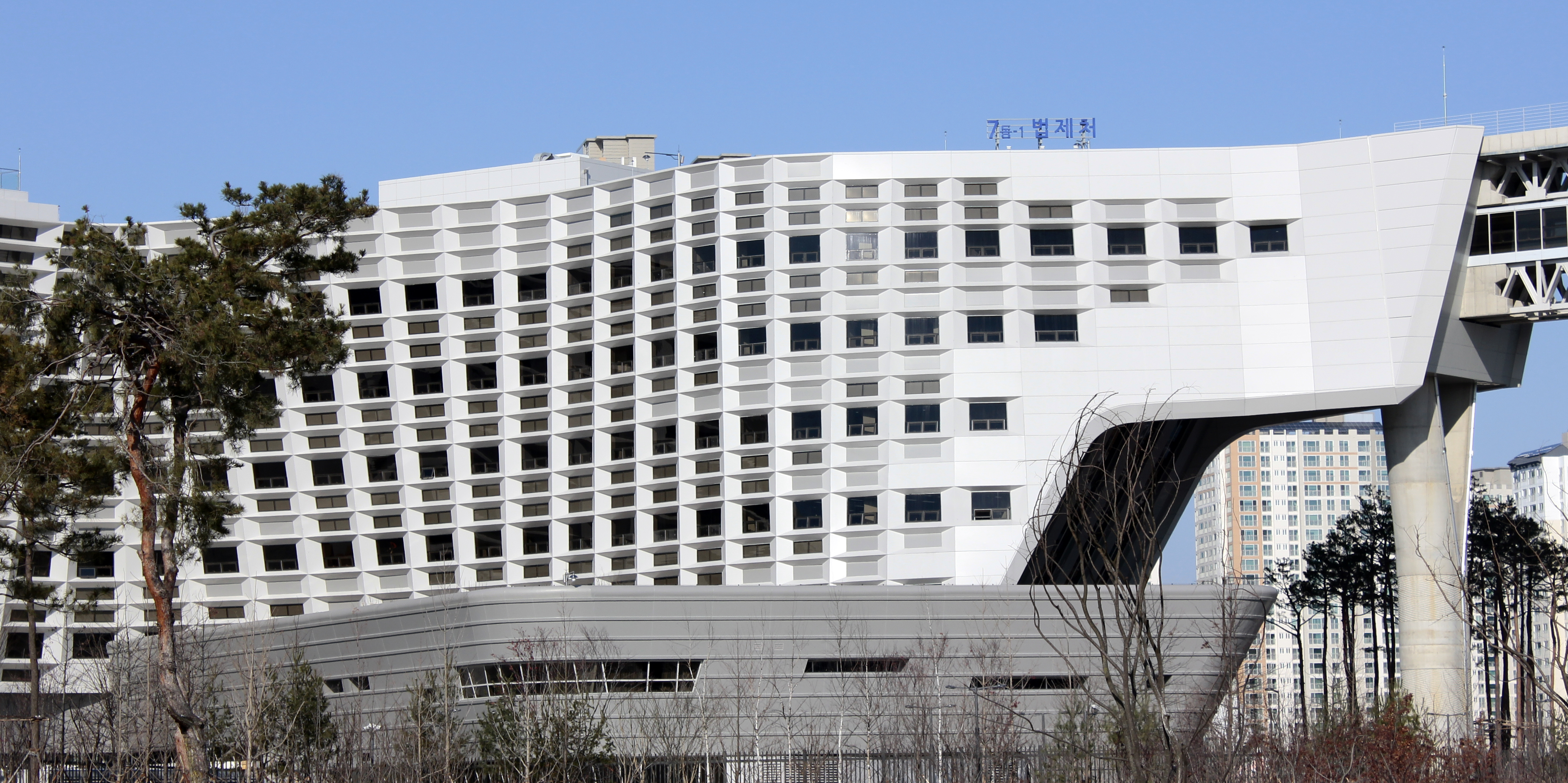
- Headquarters in Sejong

Agency overview
- Formed: 15 August 1948; 78 years ago (First Establishment); 26 December 1962; 63 years ago (Second Establishment)
- Jurisdiction: Government of South Korea
- Headquarters: 20, Doum 5-ro, Sejong, South Korea
- Minister responsible: Jo Won-cheol
- Deputy Minister responsible: Kim Chang-beom
- Website: www.moleg.go.kr/english/

Korean name
- Hangul: 법제처
- Hanja: 法制處
- RR: Beopjecheo
- MR: Pŏpchech'ŏ

The Ministry of Government Legislation (Korean: 법제처) is a ministry under the Prime Minister of South Korea. The headquarters are in Sejong.

== History ==
In the early era of the Joseon Dynasty (1392-1910), the Geum-sang-jo-rye-sa under Eui-jeong-bu was in charge of government legislative affairs. Before the decree of the king was presented to the Eui-jeong-bu, the decree had to go under close examination by the Geom-sang-jo-rye-sa. This system ensured that there wouldn't be any inconsistencies or conflicts during the execution of administrative affairs.

On August 15, 1948, with the establishment of the Korean Government, MOLEG took over the Law Drafting Bureau, The Legal Research Bureau and the Secretariat library of the Korean interim government's judicial branch, which was the provisional administrative office. And it set up a library and 1 agency, 3 divisions and ten departments, in jurisdiction of the Prime Minister's Office.

On November 29, 1954, as the Prime Minister System was abolished, the name changed to the Legislative Counseling Office of the Ministry of Justice (cabinet ministerial level), having the position of independent central administrative agency. In 1960, the Parliamentary Cabinet system was adopted and as the Secretariat of State Council was established, it was reorganized into the Government Legislative Bureau in the Secretariat of State Council.

On December 26, 1962, the government organization was restructured to that of the presidential system with the amendment of the Constitution. MOLEG was restored to its independent status as a federal administrative body under the jurisdiction of the Prime Minister, the status of which continues to this day.

== Mission ==
The missions of Ministry of Government Legislation are:

- Supervising and supporting legislative efforts of government for effective government administration
- Statutory improvement for public satisfaction
- Creating people-oriented legalization

== Logos ==
2003~2016

2016~present
