= Office for Government Policy Coordination =

Government agency of South Korea

- 국무조정실

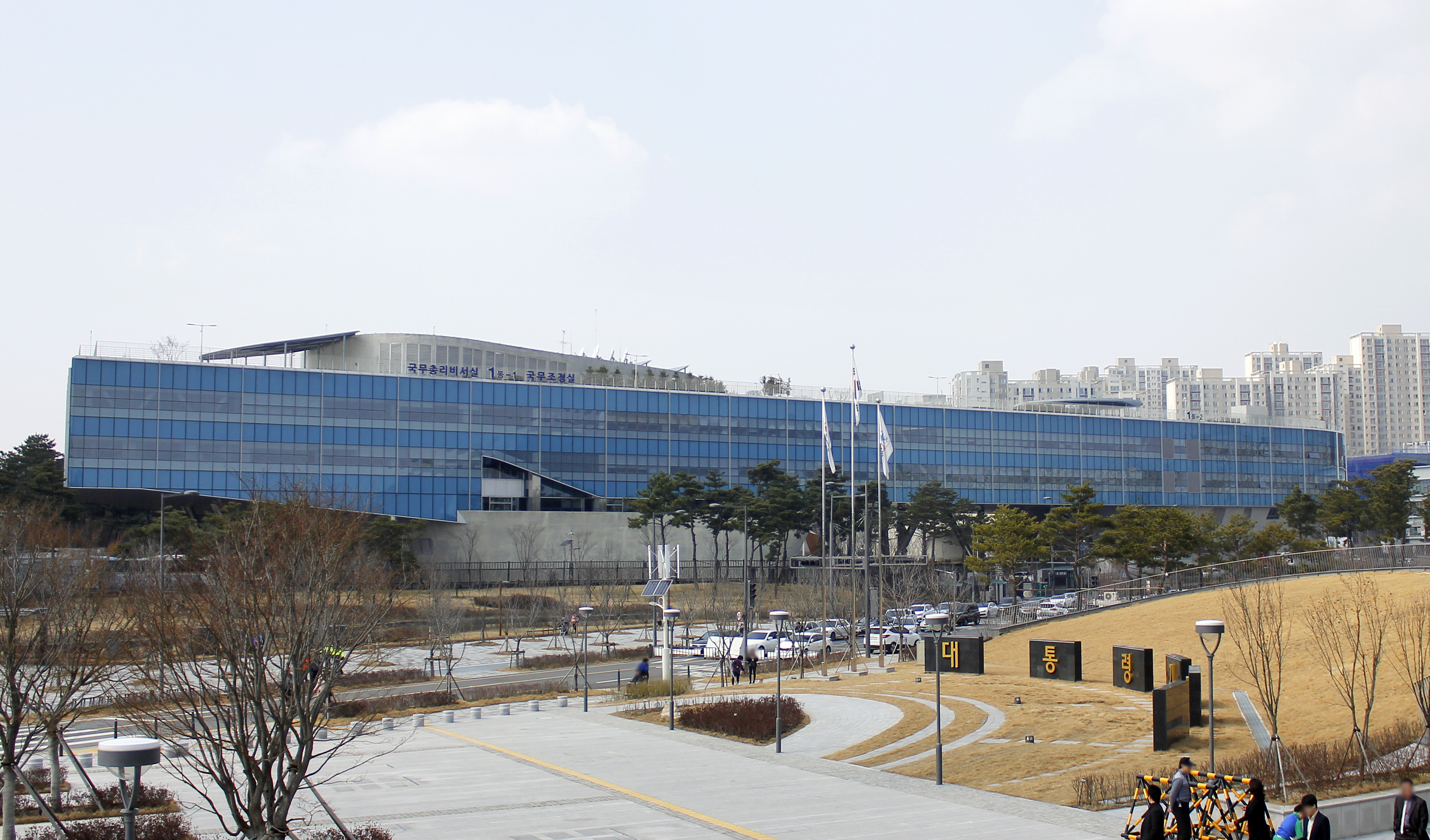
- OPC headquarters in Sejong

Agency overview
- Formed: 23 March 2013
- Jurisdiction: Government of South Korea
- Headquarters: Sejong, South Korea
- Minister responsible: Lim Ki-keun
- Deputy Ministers responsible: Kim Young-soo; Kim Yong-su
- Parent department: Prime Minister of South Korea
- Child agencies: Tax Tribunal; National Counter-Terrorism Center; Office for International Development Cooperation
- Website: http://www.opm.go.kr/en/index.do

Korean name
- Hangul: 국무조정실
- Hanja: 國務調整室
- RR: Gungmu jojeongsil
- MR: Kungmu chojŏngsil

The Office for Government Policy Coordination (OPC; Korean: 국무조정실) is a government agency of South Korea consisting of the Prime Minister's Office and the Prime Minister's Secretariat. It is led by a ministerial-level minister for government policy coordination unlike the chief of staff to the prime minister, who leads the Secretariat and is a vice minister-grade official. The OPC minister chairs the Vice Ministers' Council (차관회의), which supports State Council comprising ministers and led by the President and often prime minister. Moreover, two vice ministers are under the OPC minister.

The OPC was the first government agency to move its headquarters to Sejong in 2012.

It has as affiliates the Tax Tribunal and National Counter-Terrorism Center and oversees many government-funded think tanks mostly based in Sejong including the Korea Development Institute and OECD Korea Policy Center.

== History ==
Its history can be traced back to 1973 with the opening of the Administrative Coordination Office. In 1998, the office got its present name of the Office for Government Policy Coordination. In 2008, it was merged with the Prime Minister's Secretariat into the Prime Minister's Office. In 2013, it was made separate again and restructured to form the Prime Minister's Office together with the Secretariat.

Several figures were appointed minister of economy and finance after serving as minister for government policy coordination including Kim Jin-pyo, Kim Dong-yeon, Hong Nam-ki, Han Duck-soo and Choo Kyung-ho.
