= Fair Trade Commission (South Korea) =

Competition regulator in South Korea

- 공정거래위원회

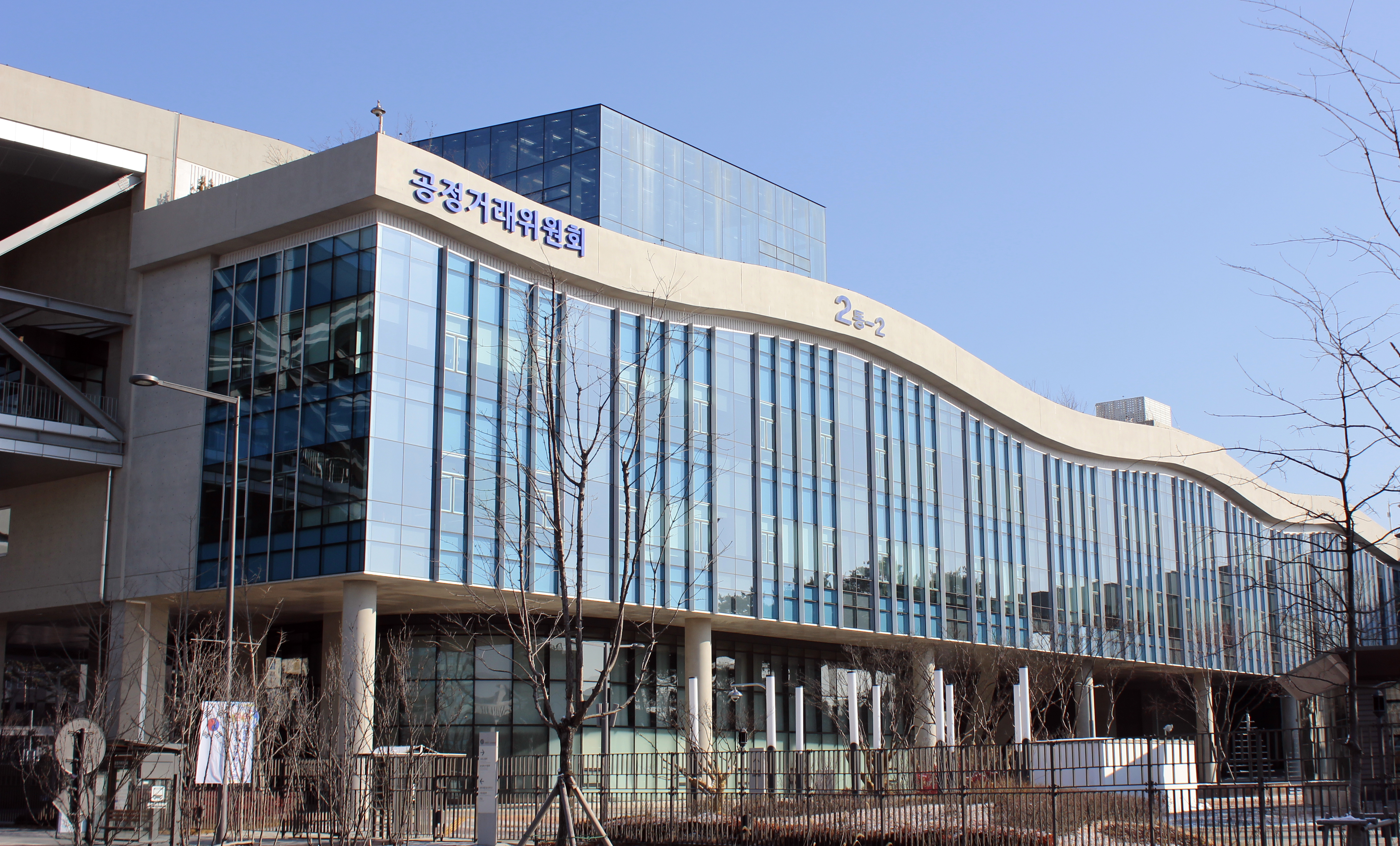
- FTC headquarters in Sejong

Agency overview
- Formed: December 23, 1994; 31 years ago
- Jurisdiction: Government of South Korea
- Headquarters: Sejong, South Korea
- Employees: 650
- Annual budget: 159.6 billion won (2023)
- Agency executives: Ju Biung-ghi, Chairperson; Cho Hong-sun, Deputy Chairperson
- Website: ftc.go.kr

Korean name
- Hangul: 공정거래위원회
- Hanja: 公正去來委員會
- RR: Gongjeong georae wiwonhoe
- MR: Kongjŏng kŏrae wiwŏnhoe

The Korea Fair Trade Commission (KFTC) is South Korea's regulatory authority for economic competition. It was established in 1981 within the Economic Planning Board. The establishing law was the Monopoly Regulation and Fair Trade Act (MRFTA), Law No. 3320, December 31, 1980. In 1994, the Fair Trade Commission and its secretariat were separated from the Economic Planning Board as an independent vice ministerial-level, central administrative organization. In 1996, the status of the KFTC Chairman was elevated from vice-ministerial to ministerial level.

== Organization ==
The original KFTC had five commissioners from 1981 to 1990. This was increased to seven commissioners from 1990 to 1997. Since 1997 the KFTC has had nine commissioners, which includes a Chairman who serves for fixed three years, a Vice-Chairman, and three other standing commissioners. There are four non-standing commissioners. Their terms can only be renewed for once. The KFTC is supported in its work by a secretariat.

Kim Sang-jo, who is known as the "chaebol sniper," became the first chairperson of the organisation under Moon Jae-in's administration. In 2022, President Yoon Suk-yeol named Seoul National University (SNU) law professor Han Ki-jeong, as chair of the agency.

== Enforcement ==
Apart from the MRFTA, the KFTC enforces the following statutes:

- Adhesion Contract Act, Law No. 3922, December 31, 1986.
- Fair Labelling and Advertising Act, Law No. 5814, February 5, 1999.
- Omnibus Cartel Repeal Act, Law No. 5815, February 5, 1999.
- Door-to-Door Sales Act, Law No. 4481, December 31, 1991.
- Installment Transactions Act, Law No. 4480, December 31, 1991.
- Fair Subcontract Transactions Act, Law No. 3799, December 31, 1984.
- Fair Franchise Transactions Act, Law No. 6704, May 13, 2002.
- Consumer Protection in Electronic Commerce Act, Law No. 6687, March 30, 2002.

== Notable cases ==
=== Microsoft bundling (2005) ===
On December 7, 2005, the KFTC reached the decision to order Microsoft Corporation and Microsoft Korea, inter alia, to unbundle certain tied products, including Windows Media Player and MSN Messenger, and to impose surcharges amounting to 33 billion won (31 million US dollars) for violation of the Monopoly Regulation and Fair Trade Act (MRFTA), including the abuse of market dominant position provision. On October 16, 2007, the Associated Press reported that Microsoft has stopped appealing the December 2005 decision and has withdrawn the appeal.

=== LPG supplier cartel (2009) ===
In 2009, the KFTC fined six liquefied petroleum gas suppliers a combined KRW 668.9 billion for fixing the prices of propane and butane. This broke the fine record, previously held by Qualcomm. SK Gas, the second to come forward, was exempted from half the fine. Its affiliate SK Energy was the first to confess and was completely exempted. This reduced the total sum to KRW 409.3 billion. The remaining four denied the charges, blaming Saudi Aramco's 60 percent share of the market supply for the similar prices.

=== Online music price fixing (2011) ===
On February 28, 2011, the KFTC alleged that fifteen online music companies decided to rig the market once non-DRM digital songs were allowed to be downloaded, starting May 2008. Non-DRM songs allow for infinite downloads, which led companies to discontinue products and certificates that catered to non-DRM songs. Thirteen of the listed companies also stopped distributing songs to services which offered infinite downloads. A representative of the FTC revealed that the companies fixed prices together, restricting consumer choice.

==== Recommended fines ====
Company	Amount (USD)
SK Telecom	1.96 million
LOEN Entertainment	9.69 million
KT	811,000
KT Music	1.16 million
Mnet Media	1.98 million
Neowiz Bugs	1.11 million
Sony Music Entertainment Korea	1.19 million
Universal Music	814,000
Warner Music Korea	96,000

LOEN Entertainment's CEO Shin Won-soo, KT Music's CEO Kim Min-wook and Mnet Media's CEO Kim Sung-soo would be prosecuted separately.

=== Qualcomm patents (2016) ===
In 2016, the KFTC fined Qualcomm KRW 1 trillion for refusing to license patents to rival chipmakers. This was the largest KFTC fine at that point. The company also prevented mobile phone manufacturers from using patents without purchasing chipsets. The Seoul High Court upheld the fine as well as six out of ten of the corrective orders in 2023 after the company appealed in 2017.

=== Google Android OS (2021) ===
In 2021, the KFTC fined Google KRW 207.4 billion for restricting smartphone manufacturers from installing alternative operating systems through anti-fragmentation agreements. Samsung Electronics and LG had violated these contracts before through modifications of Android on various devices.

=== Flour cartel (2026) ===
In May 2026, seven flour makers (Daehan Flour Mills, CJ CheilJedang, Sajo DongA One, Samyang, Daesun Flour Mills, Samhwa Flour Mills and Hantop) were fined a record 671 billion won ($444 million) for collusion over six years. The companies were found to have colluded even while receiving conditional government subsidies. The same companies had also been penalized in 2006.

== Action statistics ==
Between 2019 and 2022, the KFTC reviewed hundreds of mergers and acquisitions and imposed billions of won in cartel fines per year.

Total cartel fines
Year	Fines (KRW)	Cartel cases
2023	132.3 billion	54
2021	572.5 billion	89
2019	92 billion	51

Reviewed mergers and acquisitions
Year	Total cases	In-depth investigation	Competitive concerns
2022	927	39	2
2021	1113	20	1
2019	766	18	5
2018	702	24	3

Reviewed mergers and acquisitions by company nationality
Year	Domestic company mergers	Foreign company mergers
2022	769	151
2021	954	159
2019	598	168

=== Most fined conglomerates ===
According to KFTC data from 2016, covering 2012 onwards, it had fined the following conglomerates the most:

	Name	Fines (KRW)	Violations	Violations fined
1	Hyundai Motor	349.6 billion	64	26
2	Samsung Group	283.2 billion		19
3	POSCO	217.6 billion	49	21

== See also ==
- Competition law
- Competition policy
- Competition regulator
- Consumer protection
