= Deputy Prime Minister of South Korea =

South Korean government position

Deputy Prime Minister of the Republic of Korea
- Emblem of South Korea

- Flag of South Korea

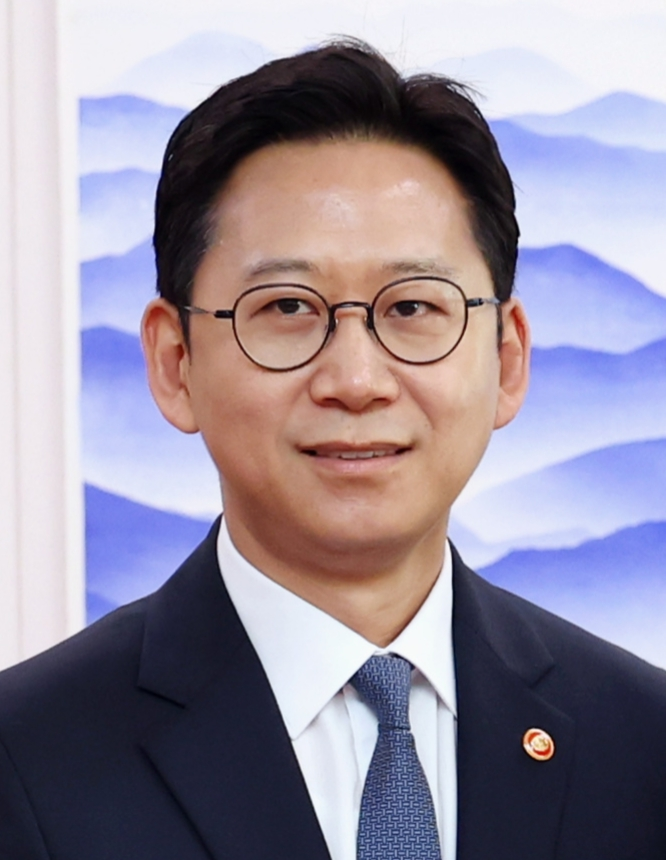
- Incumbent; Economy: Lee Hyoung-il (left) since 22 September 2026; Science and ICT：Bae Kyung-hoon (right) since 1 October 2025
- Executive branch of the Government of South Korea
- Style: Mr/Madam Deputy Prime Minister (informal); His/Her Excellency (diplomatic)
- Member of: State Council
- Reports to: Prime Minister
- Residence: None
- Seat: Seoul, South Korea
- Appointer: President
- Term length: No term limit
- Inaugural holder: Kim Yoo-taek
- Formation: 17 December 1963; 62 years ago
- Succession: Prime Minister
- Website: (in English) pmo.go.kr/ (in Korean) pmo.go.kr/

- Deputy Prime Minister of South Korea
- Hangul: 부총리
- Hanja: 副總理
- RR: Buchongni
- MR: Puch'ongni

The deputy prime minister of the Republic of Korea (Korean: 대한민국의 부총리) is a senior member of the Cabinet of South Korea that serves as the deputy to the prime minister. The senior deputy prime minister acts for the prime minister in the event of an impeachment or vacancy. Lee Hyoung-il currently serves as deputy prime minister of Economy while Bae Kyung-hoon as deputy prime minister of Science and ICT.

== List of deputy prime ministers ==
=== Third Republic (1963–1972) ===
No.	Portrait	Name (Birth–Death)	Term of office		Other portfolios	Prime minister (Tenure)	President (Tenure)
No.	Portrait	Name (Birth–Death)	Took office	Left office	Other portfolios	Prime minister (Tenure)	President (Tenure)
1		Kim Yoo-taek 김유택 金裕澤 (1911–1975)	17 December 1963	11 May 1964	Director of the Economic Planning Board	Choi Tu-son (1963–1964)	Park Chung Hee (1963–1979)
1		Kim Yoo-taek 김유택 金裕澤 (1911–1975)	17 December 1963	11 May 1964	Director of the Economic Planning Board	Chung Il-kwon (1964–1970)	Park Chung Hee (1963–1979)
2		Chang Ki-young 장기영 張基榮 (1916–1977)	11 May 1964	3 October 1967	Director of the Economic Planning Board	Chung Il-kwon (1964–1970)	Park Chung Hee (1963–1979)
3		Park Choong-hoon 박충훈 朴忠勳 (1919–2001)	3 October 1967	3 June 1969	Director of the Economic Planning Board	Chung Il-kwon (1964–1970)	Park Chung Hee (1963–1979)
4		Kim Hak-ryul 김학렬 金鶴烈 (1923–1972)	3 June 1969	4 January 1972	Director of the Economic Planning Board	Chung Il-kwon (1964–1970)	Park Chung Hee (1963–1979)
4		Kim Hak-ryul 김학렬 金鶴烈 (1923–1972)	3 June 1969	4 January 1972	Director of the Economic Planning Board	Paik Too-chin (1970–1971)	Park Chung Hee (1963–1979)
4		Kim Hak-ryul 김학렬 金鶴烈 (1923–1972)	3 June 1969	4 January 1972	Director of the Economic Planning Board	Kim Jong-pil (1971–1975)	Park Chung Hee (1963–1979)
5		Tae Wan-seon 태완선 太完善 (1915–1988)	4 January 1972	21 November 1972	Director of the Economic Planning Board	Kim Jong-pil (1971–1975)	Park Chung Hee (1963–1979)

=== Fourth Republic (1972–1981) ===
No.	Portrait	Name (Birth–Death)	Term of office		Other portfolios	Prime minister (Tenure)	President (Tenure)
No.	Portrait	Name (Birth–Death)	Took office	Left office	Other portfolios	Prime minister (Tenure)	President (Tenure)
5		Tae Wan-seon 태완선 太完善 (1915–1988)	21 November 1972	18 September 1974	Director of the Economic Planning Board	Kim Jong-pil (1971–1975)	Park Chung Hee (1963–1979) Choi Kyu-hah (acting: 1979)
6		Nam Duck-woo 남덕우 南德祐 (1924–2013)	18 September 1974	22 December 1978	Director of the Economic Planning Board	Kim Jong-pil (1971–1975)	Park Chung Hee (1963–1979) Choi Kyu-hah (acting: 1979)
6		Nam Duck-woo 남덕우 南德祐 (1924–2013)	18 September 1974	22 December 1978	Director of the Economic Planning Board	Choi Kyu-hah (1975–1979) Shin Hyun-hwak (acting: 1979) Han-bin Lee (acting: 1979)	Park Chung Hee (1963–1979) Choi Kyu-hah (acting: 1979)
7		Shin Hyun-hwak 신현확 申鉉碻 (1920–2007)	22 December 1978	13 December 1979	Director of the Economic Planning Board	Choi Kyu-hah (1975–1979) Shin Hyun-hwak (acting: 1979) Han-bin Lee (acting: 1979)	Park Chung Hee (1963–1979) Choi Kyu-hah (acting: 1979)
7		Shin Hyun-hwak 신현확 申鉉碻 (1920–2007)	22 December 1978	13 December 1979	Director of the Economic Planning Board	Choi Kyu-hah (1975–1979) Shin Hyun-hwak (acting: 1979) Han-bin Lee (acting: 1979)	Choi Kyu-hah (1979–1980) Park Choong-hoon (acting: 1980)
8		Han-bin Lee 이한빈 李漢彬 (1926–2004)	13 December 1979	22 May 1980	Director of the Economic Planning Board	Choi Kyu-hah (1975–1979) Shin Hyun-hwak (acting: 1979) Han-bin Lee (acting: 1979)	Choi Kyu-hah (1979–1980) Park Choong-hoon (acting: 1980)
8		Han-bin Lee 이한빈 李漢彬 (1926–2004)	13 December 1979	22 May 1980	Director of the Economic Planning Board	Shin Hyun-hwak (1979–1980) Park Choong-hoon (acting: 1980)	Choi Kyu-hah (1979–1980) Park Choong-hoon (acting: 1980)
9		Kim Won-ki 김원기 金元基 (1924–2001)	22 May 1980	2 September 1980	Director of the Economic Planning Board	Shin Hyun-hwak (1979–1980) Park Choong-hoon (acting: 1980)	Choi Kyu-hah (1979–1980) Park Choong-hoon (acting: 1980)
10		Shin Byung-hyun 신병현 申秉鉉 (1921–1999)	2 September 1980	24 February 1981	Director of the Economic Planning Board	Nam Duck-woo (1980–1982)	Chun Doo-hwan (1980–1988)

=== Fifth Republic (1981–1988) ===
No.	Portrait	Name (Birth–Death)	Term of office		Other portfolios	Prime minister (Tenure)	President (Tenure)
No.	Portrait	Name (Birth–Death)	Took office	Left office	Other portfolios	Prime minister (Tenure)	President (Tenure)
10		Shin Byung-hyun 신병현 申秉鉉 (1921–1999)	25 February 1981	4 January 1982	Director of the Economic Planning Board	Nam Duck-woo (1980–1982)	Chun Doo-hwan (1980–1988)
11		Kim Jun-seong 김준성 金埈成	4 January 1982	7 July 1983	Director of the Economic Planning Board	Yoo Chang-soon (1982)	Chun Doo-hwan (1980–1988)
11		Kim Jun-seong 김준성 金埈成	4 January 1982	7 July 1983	Director of the Economic Planning Board	Kim Sang-hyup (1982–1983)	Chun Doo-hwan (1980–1988)
12		Seo Seok-jun 서석준 徐錫俊 (1938–1983)	7 July 1983	7 October 1983	Director of the Economic Planning Board	Kim Sang-hyup (1982–1983)	Chun Doo-hwan (1980–1988)
Vacant (7–15 October 1983)						Kim Sang-hyup (1982–1983)	Chun Doo-hwan (1980–1988)
13		Shin Byung-hyun 신병현 申秉鉉 (1921–1999)	15 October 1983	8 January 1986	Director of the Economic Planning Board	Chin Iee-chong (1983–1985) Shin Byung-hyun (acting: 1984–1985)	Chun Doo-hwan (1980–1988)
13		Shin Byung-hyun 신병현 申秉鉉 (1921–1999)	15 October 1983	8 January 1986	Director of the Economic Planning Board	Lho Shin-yong (1985–1987) Lee Han-key (acting: 1987)	Chun Doo-hwan (1980–1988)
14		Kim Man-je 김만제 金滿堤 (1934–2019)	8 January 1986	26 May 1987	Director of the Economic Planning Board	Lho Shin-yong (1985–1987) Lee Han-key (acting: 1987)	Chun Doo-hwan (1980–1988)
15		Chung In-yong 정인용 鄭寅用	26 May 1987	24 February 1988	Director of the Economic Planning Board	Lho Shin-yong (1985–1987) Lee Han-key (acting: 1987)	Chun Doo-hwan (1980–1988)
15		Chung In-yong 정인용 鄭寅用	26 May 1987	24 February 1988	Director of the Economic Planning Board	Kim Chung-yul (1987–1988)	Chun Doo-hwan (1980–1988)

=== Sixth Republic (since 1988) ===
No.	Portrait	Name (Birth–Death)	Term of office		Other portfolios	Prime minister (Tenure)	President (Tenure)
No.	Portrait	Name (Birth–Death)	Took office	Left office	Other portfolios	Prime minister (Tenure)	President (Tenure)
16		Rha Woong-bae 나웅배 羅雄培 (1934–2022)	25 February 1988	5 December 1988	Director of the Economic Planning Board	Lee Hyun-jae (1988) Kang Young-hoon (1988–1990) Ro Jai-bong (1990–1991) Chung Won-shik (1991–1992) Hyun Soong-jong (1992–1993)	Roh Tae-woo (1988–1993)
17		Cho Soon 조순 趙淳 (1928–2022)	5 December 1988	17 March 1990	Director of the Economic Planning Board	Lee Hyun-jae (1988) Kang Young-hoon (1988–1990) Ro Jai-bong (1990–1991) Chung Won-shik (1991–1992) Hyun Soong-jong (1992–1993)	Roh Tae-woo (1988–1993)
18		Lee Seung-yoon 이승윤 李承潤 (1931–2020)	17 March 1990	18 February 1991	Director of the Economic Planning Board	Lee Hyun-jae (1988) Kang Young-hoon (1988–1990) Ro Jai-bong (1990–1991) Chung Won-shik (1991–1992) Hyun Soong-jong (1992–1993)	Roh Tae-woo (1988–1993)
19		Choi Ho-joong 최호중 崔浩中 (1930–2015)	27 December 1990	25 June 1992	Minister of Unification	Lee Hyun-jae (1988) Kang Young-hoon (1988–1990) Ro Jai-bong (1990–1991) Chung Won-shik (1991–1992) Hyun Soong-jong (1992–1993)	Roh Tae-woo (1988–1993)
20		Choi Gak-kyu 최각규 崔珏圭 (1933–2024)	18 February 1991	25 February 1993	Director of the Economic Planning Board	Lee Hyun-jae (1988) Kang Young-hoon (1988–1990) Ro Jai-bong (1990–1991) Chung Won-shik (1991–1992) Hyun Soong-jong (1992–1993)	Roh Tae-woo (1988–1993)
21		Choi Yong-chol 최영철 崔永喆 (1935–2025)	25 June 1992	25 February 1993	Minister of Unification	Lee Hyun-jae (1988) Kang Young-hoon (1988–1990) Ro Jai-bong (1990–1991) Chung Won-shik (1991–1992) Hyun Soong-jong (1992–1993)	Roh Tae-woo (1988–1993)
22		Lee Kyung-sik 이경식 李經植 (1933–2021)	25 February 1993	21 December 1993	Director of the Economic Planning Board	Hwang In-sung (1993) Lee Hoi-chang (1993–1994) Lee Yung-dug (1994) Lee Hong-koo (1994–1995) Lee Soo-sung (1995–1997) Goh Kun (1997–1998)	Kim Young-sam (1993–1998)
23		Han Wan-sang 한완상 韓完相 (born 1936)	25 February 1993	22 December 1993	Minister of Unification	Hwang In-sung (1993) Lee Hoi-chang (1993–1994) Lee Yung-dug (1994) Lee Hong-koo (1994–1995) Lee Soo-sung (1995–1997) Goh Kun (1997–1998)	Kim Young-sam (1993–1998)
24		Chung Jai-suk 정재석 丁渽錫 (born 1930)	21 December 1993	5 October 1994	Director of the Economic Planning Board	Hwang In-sung (1993) Lee Hoi-chang (1993–1994) Lee Yung-dug (1994) Lee Hong-koo (1994–1995) Lee Soo-sung (1995–1997) Goh Kun (1997–1998)	Kim Young-sam (1993–1998)
25		Lee Yung-dug 이영덕 李榮徳 (1926–2010)	22 December 1993	30 April 1994	Minister of Unification	Hwang In-sung (1993) Lee Hoi-chang (1993–1994) Lee Yung-dug (1994) Lee Hong-koo (1994–1995) Lee Soo-sung (1995–1997) Goh Kun (1997–1998)	Kim Young-sam (1993–1998)
26		Lee Hong-koo 이홍구 李洪九 (1934–2026)	30 April 1994	17 December 1994	Minister of Unification	Hwang In-sung (1993) Lee Hoi-chang (1993–1994) Lee Yung-dug (1994) Lee Hong-koo (1994–1995) Lee Soo-sung (1995–1997) Goh Kun (1997–1998)	Kim Young-sam (1993–1998)
27		Hong Jae-hyung 홍재형 洪在馨 (born 1938)	4 October 1994	20 December 1995	Director of the Economic Planning Board (until 1994); Minister of Finance and Economy (from 1994)	Hwang In-sung (1993) Lee Hoi-chang (1993–1994) Lee Yung-dug (1994) Lee Hong-koo (1994–1995) Lee Soo-sung (1995–1997) Goh Kun (1997–1998)	Kim Young-sam (1993–1998)
28		Kim Duck 김덕 金悳 (born 1935)	24 December 1994	22 February 1995	Minister of Unification	Hwang In-sung (1993) Lee Hoi-chang (1993–1994) Lee Yung-dug (1994) Lee Hong-koo (1994–1995) Lee Soo-sung (1995–1997) Goh Kun (1997–1998)	Kim Young-sam (1993–1998)
29		Rha Woong-bae 나웅배 羅雄培 (1934–2022)	22 February 1995	8 August 1996	Minister of Unification (until 1995); Minister of Finance and Economy (from 1995)	Hwang In-sung (1993) Lee Hoi-chang (1993–1994) Lee Yung-dug (1994) Lee Hong-koo (1994–1995) Lee Soo-sung (1995–1997) Goh Kun (1997–1998)	Kim Young-sam (1993–1998)
30		Kwon Oh-kee 권오기 權五琦 (1932–2011)	21 December 1995	25 February 1998	Minister of Unification	Hwang In-sung (1993) Lee Hoi-chang (1993–1994) Lee Yung-dug (1994) Lee Hong-koo (1994–1995) Lee Soo-sung (1995–1997) Goh Kun (1997–1998)	Kim Young-sam (1993–1998)
31		Han Seung-soo 한승수 韓昇洙 (born 1936)	8 August 1996	5 March 1997	Minister of Finance and Economy	Hwang In-sung (1993) Lee Hoi-chang (1993–1994) Lee Yung-dug (1994) Lee Hong-koo (1994–1995) Lee Soo-sung (1995–1997) Goh Kun (1997–1998)	Kim Young-sam (1993–1998)
32		Kang Kyeoung-sik 강경식 姜慶植 (born 1936)	5 March 1997	19 November 1997	Minister of Finance and Economy	Hwang In-sung (1993) Lee Hoi-chang (1993–1994) Lee Yung-dug (1994) Lee Hong-koo (1994–1995) Lee Soo-sung (1995–1997) Goh Kun (1997–1998)	Kim Young-sam (1993–1998)
33		Lim Chang-yeol 임창열 林昌烈 (born 1944)	19 November 1997	25 February 1998	Minister of Finance and Economy	Hwang In-sung (1993) Lee Hoi-chang (1993–1994) Lee Yung-dug (1994) Lee Hong-koo (1994–1995) Lee Soo-sung (1995–1997) Goh Kun (1997–1998)	Kim Young-sam (1993–1998)
(30)		Kwon Oh-kee 권오기 權五琦 (1932–2011)	25 February 1998	2 March 1998	Minister of Unification	Goh Kun (1998) Kim Jong-pil (1998–2000) Park Tae-joon (2000) Lee Hun-jai (acting: 2000) Lee Han-dong (2000–2002) Chang Sang (acting: 2002) Jeon Yun-churl (acting: 2002) Chang Dae-whan (acting: 2002) Kim Suk-soo (2002–2003)	Kim Dae-jung (1998–2003)
(33)		Lim Chang-yeol 임창열 林昌烈 (born 1944)	25 February 1998	5 March 1998	Minister of Finance and Economy	Goh Kun (1998) Kim Jong-pil (1998–2000) Park Tae-joon (2000) Lee Hun-jai (acting: 2000) Lee Han-dong (2000–2002) Chang Sang (acting: 2002) Jeon Yun-churl (acting: 2002) Chang Dae-whan (acting: 2002) Kim Suk-soo (2002–2003)	Kim Dae-jung (1998–2003)
Office not in use (5 March 1998 – 29 January 2001)						Goh Kun (1998) Kim Jong-pil (1998–2000) Park Tae-joon (2000) Lee Hun-jai (acting: 2000) Lee Han-dong (2000–2002) Chang Sang (acting: 2002) Jeon Yun-churl (acting: 2002) Chang Dae-whan (acting: 2002) Kim Suk-soo (2002–2003)	Kim Dae-jung (1998–2003)
34		Jin Nyum 진념 陳稔 (born 1940)	29 January 2001	15 April 2002	Minister of Finance and Economy	Goh Kun (1998) Kim Jong-pil (1998–2000) Park Tae-joon (2000) Lee Hun-jai (acting: 2000) Lee Han-dong (2000–2002) Chang Sang (acting: 2002) Jeon Yun-churl (acting: 2002) Chang Dae-whan (acting: 2002) Kim Suk-soo (2002–2003)	Kim Dae-jung (1998–2003)
35		Han Wan-sang 한완상 韓完相 (born 1936)	29 January 2001	29 January 2002	Minister of Education and Human Resources	Goh Kun (1998) Kim Jong-pil (1998–2000) Park Tae-joon (2000) Lee Hun-jai (acting: 2000) Lee Han-dong (2000–2002) Chang Sang (acting: 2002) Jeon Yun-churl (acting: 2002) Chang Dae-whan (acting: 2002) Kim Suk-soo (2002–2003)	Kim Dae-jung (1998–2003)
36		Lee Sang-joo 이상주 李相周 (1937–2023)	29 January 2002	25 February 2003	Minister of Education and Human Resources	Goh Kun (1998) Kim Jong-pil (1998–2000) Park Tae-joon (2000) Lee Hun-jai (acting: 2000) Lee Han-dong (2000–2002) Chang Sang (acting: 2002) Jeon Yun-churl (acting: 2002) Chang Dae-whan (acting: 2002) Kim Suk-soo (2002–2003)	Kim Dae-jung (1998–2003)
37		Jeon Yun-churl 전윤철 田允喆 (born 1939)	15 April 2002	25 February 2003	Minister of Finance and Economy	Goh Kun (1998) Kim Jong-pil (1998–2000) Park Tae-joon (2000) Lee Hun-jai (acting: 2000) Lee Han-dong (2000–2002) Chang Sang (acting: 2002) Jeon Yun-churl (acting: 2002) Chang Dae-whan (acting: 2002) Kim Suk-soo (2002–2003)	Kim Dae-jung (1998–2003)
(36)		Lee Sang-joo 이상주 李相周 (1937–2023)	25 February 2003	6 March 2003	Minister of Education and Human Resources	Kim Suk-soo (2003) Goh Kun (2003–2004) Lee Hun-jai (acting: 2004) Lee Hae-chan (2004–2006) Han Duck-soo (acting: 2006) Han Myeong-sook (2006–2007) Kwon O-kyu (acting: 2007) Han Duck-soo (2007–2008)	Roh Moo-hyun (2003–2008) Goh Kun (acting: 2004)
(37)		Jeon Yun-churl 전윤철 田允喆 (born 1939)	25 February 2003	27 February 2003	Minister of Finance and Economy	Kim Suk-soo (2003) Goh Kun (2003–2004) Lee Hun-jai (acting: 2004) Lee Hae-chan (2004–2006) Han Duck-soo (acting: 2006) Han Myeong-sook (2006–2007) Kwon O-kyu (acting: 2007) Han Duck-soo (2007–2008)	Roh Moo-hyun (2003–2008) Goh Kun (acting: 2004)
38		Kim Jin-pyo 김진표 金振杓 (born 1947)	27 February 2003	10 February 2004	Minister of Finance and Economy	Kim Suk-soo (2003) Goh Kun (2003–2004) Lee Hun-jai (acting: 2004) Lee Hae-chan (2004–2006) Han Duck-soo (acting: 2006) Han Myeong-sook (2006–2007) Kwon O-kyu (acting: 2007) Han Duck-soo (2007–2008)	Roh Moo-hyun (2003–2008) Goh Kun (acting: 2004)
39		Yoon Deok-hong 윤덕홍 尹德弘 (born 1947)	7 March 2003	23 December 2003	Minister of Education and Human Resources	Kim Suk-soo (2003) Goh Kun (2003–2004) Lee Hun-jai (acting: 2004) Lee Hae-chan (2004–2006) Han Duck-soo (acting: 2006) Han Myeong-sook (2006–2007) Kwon O-kyu (acting: 2007) Han Duck-soo (2007–2008)	Roh Moo-hyun (2003–2008) Goh Kun (acting: 2004)
40		Ahn Byung-young 안병영 安秉永 (born 1941)	24 December 2003	5 January 2005	Minister of Education and Human Resources	Kim Suk-soo (2003) Goh Kun (2003–2004) Lee Hun-jai (acting: 2004) Lee Hae-chan (2004–2006) Han Duck-soo (acting: 2006) Han Myeong-sook (2006–2007) Kwon O-kyu (acting: 2007) Han Duck-soo (2007–2008)	Roh Moo-hyun (2003–2008) Goh Kun (acting: 2004)
41		Lee Hun-jai 이헌재 李憲宰 (born 1944)	10 February 2004	7 March 2005	Minister of Finance and Economy	Kim Suk-soo (2003) Goh Kun (2003–2004) Lee Hun-jai (acting: 2004) Lee Hae-chan (2004–2006) Han Duck-soo (acting: 2006) Han Myeong-sook (2006–2007) Kwon O-kyu (acting: 2007) Han Duck-soo (2007–2008)	Roh Moo-hyun (2003–2008) Goh Kun (acting: 2004)
42		Oh Myung 오명 吳明 (born 1940)	18 October 2004	10 February 2006	Minister of Science and Technology	Kim Suk-soo (2003) Goh Kun (2003–2004) Lee Hun-jai (acting: 2004) Lee Hae-chan (2004–2006) Han Duck-soo (acting: 2006) Han Myeong-sook (2006–2007) Kwon O-kyu (acting: 2007) Han Duck-soo (2007–2008)	Roh Moo-hyun (2003–2008) Goh Kun (acting: 2004)
43		Lee Ki-jun 이기준 李基俊 (1938–2025)	5 January 2005	11 January 2005	Minister of Education and Human Resources	Kim Suk-soo (2003) Goh Kun (2003–2004) Lee Hun-jai (acting: 2004) Lee Hae-chan (2004–2006) Han Duck-soo (acting: 2006) Han Myeong-sook (2006–2007) Kwon O-kyu (acting: 2007) Han Duck-soo (2007–2008)	Roh Moo-hyun (2003–2008) Goh Kun (acting: 2004)
44		Kim Jin-pyo 김진표 金振杓 (born 1947)	28 January 2005	21 July 2006	Minister of Education and Human Resources	Kim Suk-soo (2003) Goh Kun (2003–2004) Lee Hun-jai (acting: 2004) Lee Hae-chan (2004–2006) Han Duck-soo (acting: 2006) Han Myeong-sook (2006–2007) Kwon O-kyu (acting: 2007) Han Duck-soo (2007–2008)	Roh Moo-hyun (2003–2008) Goh Kun (acting: 2004)
45		Han Duck-soo 한덕수 韓悳洙 (born 1949)	14 March 2005	18 July 2006	Minister of Finance and Economy	Kim Suk-soo (2003) Goh Kun (2003–2004) Lee Hun-jai (acting: 2004) Lee Hae-chan (2004–2006) Han Duck-soo (acting: 2006) Han Myeong-sook (2006–2007) Kwon O-kyu (acting: 2007) Han Duck-soo (2007–2008)	Roh Moo-hyun (2003–2008) Goh Kun (acting: 2004)
46		Kim Woo-sik 김우식 金雨植 (born 1940)	10 February 2006	25 February 2008	Minister of Science and Technology	Kim Suk-soo (2003) Goh Kun (2003–2004) Lee Hun-jai (acting: 2004) Lee Hae-chan (2004–2006) Han Duck-soo (acting: 2006) Han Myeong-sook (2006–2007) Kwon O-kyu (acting: 2007) Han Duck-soo (2007–2008)	Roh Moo-hyun (2003–2008) Goh Kun (acting: 2004)
47		Kwon O-kyu 권오규 權五奎 (born 1952)	18 July 2006	25 February 2008	Minister of Finance and Economy	Kim Suk-soo (2003) Goh Kun (2003–2004) Lee Hun-jai (acting: 2004) Lee Hae-chan (2004–2006) Han Duck-soo (acting: 2006) Han Myeong-sook (2006–2007) Kwon O-kyu (acting: 2007) Han Duck-soo (2007–2008)	Roh Moo-hyun (2003–2008) Goh Kun (acting: 2004)
48		Kim Byong-joon 김병준 金秉準 (born 1954)	21 July 2006	9 August 2006	Minister of Education and Human Resources	Kim Suk-soo (2003) Goh Kun (2003–2004) Lee Hun-jai (acting: 2004) Lee Hae-chan (2004–2006) Han Duck-soo (acting: 2006) Han Myeong-sook (2006–2007) Kwon O-kyu (acting: 2007) Han Duck-soo (2007–2008)	Roh Moo-hyun (2003–2008) Goh Kun (acting: 2004)
49		Kim Shin-il 김신일 金信一 (born 1941)	20 September 2006	6 February 2008	Minister of Education and Human Resources	Kim Suk-soo (2003) Goh Kun (2003–2004) Lee Hun-jai (acting: 2004) Lee Hae-chan (2004–2006) Han Duck-soo (acting: 2006) Han Myeong-sook (2006–2007) Kwon O-kyu (acting: 2007) Han Duck-soo (2007–2008)	Roh Moo-hyun (2003–2008) Goh Kun (acting: 2004)
(46)		Kim Woo-sik 김우식 金雨植 (born 1940)	25 February 2008	29 February 2008	Minister of Science and Technology	Han Duck-soo (2008) Han Seung-soo (2008–2009) Chung Un-chan (2009–2010) Yoon Jeung-hyun (acting: 2010) Kim Hwang-sik (2010–2013)	Lee Myung-bak (2008–2013)
(47)		Kwon O-kyu 권오규 權五奎 (born 1952)	25 February 2008	29 February 2008	Minister of Finance and Economy	Han Duck-soo (2008) Han Seung-soo (2008–2009) Chung Un-chan (2009–2010) Yoon Jeung-hyun (acting: 2010) Kim Hwang-sik (2010–2013)	Lee Myung-bak (2008–2013)
Office not in use (29 February 2008 – 25 February 2013)						Han Duck-soo (2008) Han Seung-soo (2008–2009) Chung Un-chan (2009–2010) Yoon Jeung-hyun (acting: 2010) Kim Hwang-sik (2010–2013)	Lee Myung-bak (2008–2013)
Office not in use (25 February – 22 March 2013)						Kim Hwang-sik (2013) Chung Hong-won (2013–2015) Lee Wan-koo (2015) Choi Kyoung-hwan (acting: 2015) Hwang Kyo-ahn (2015–2017)	Park Geun-hye (2013–2017) Hwang Kyo-ahn (acting: 2016–2017)
50		Hyun Oh-seok 현오석 玄旿錫 (born 1950)	22 March 2013	15 July 2014	Minister of Economy and Finance	Kim Hwang-sik (2013) Chung Hong-won (2013–2015) Lee Wan-koo (2015) Choi Kyoung-hwan (acting: 2015) Hwang Kyo-ahn (2015–2017)	Park Geun-hye (2013–2017) Hwang Kyo-ahn (acting: 2016–2017)
51		Choi Kyoung-hwan 최경환 崔炅煥 (born 1955)	15 July 2014	12 January 2016	Minister of Economy and Finance	Kim Hwang-sik (2013) Chung Hong-won (2013–2015) Lee Wan-koo (2015) Choi Kyoung-hwan (acting: 2015) Hwang Kyo-ahn (2015–2017)	Park Geun-hye (2013–2017) Hwang Kyo-ahn (acting: 2016–2017)
52		Hwang Woo-yea 황우여 黃祐呂 (born 1947)	19 November 2014	12 January 2016	Minister of Education	Kim Hwang-sik (2013) Chung Hong-won (2013–2015) Lee Wan-koo (2015) Choi Kyoung-hwan (acting: 2015) Hwang Kyo-ahn (2015–2017)	Park Geun-hye (2013–2017) Hwang Kyo-ahn (acting: 2016–2017)
53		Yoo Il-ho 유일호 柳一鎬 (born 1955)	13 January 2016	10 May 2017	Minister of Economy and Finance	Kim Hwang-sik (2013) Chung Hong-won (2013–2015) Lee Wan-koo (2015) Choi Kyoung-hwan (acting: 2015) Hwang Kyo-ahn (2015–2017)	Park Geun-hye (2013–2017) Hwang Kyo-ahn (acting: 2016–2017)
54		Lee Joon-sik 이준식 李俊植 (born 1952)	13 January 2016	10 May 2017	Minister of Education	Kim Hwang-sik (2013) Chung Hong-won (2013–2015) Lee Wan-koo (2015) Choi Kyoung-hwan (acting: 2015) Hwang Kyo-ahn (2015–2017)	Park Geun-hye (2013–2017) Hwang Kyo-ahn (acting: 2016–2017)
(53)		Yoo Il-ho 유일호 柳一鎬 (born 1955)	10 May 2017	9 June 2017	Minister of Economy and Finance	Hwang Kyo-ahn (2017) Yoo Il-ho (acting: 2017) Lee Nak-yon (2017–2020) Chung Sye-kyun (2020–2021) Hong Nam-ki (acting: 2021) Kim Boo-kyum (2021–2022)	Moon Jae-in (2017–2022)
(54)		Lee Joon-sik 이준식 李俊植 (born 1952)	10 May 2017	4 July 2017	Minister of Education	Hwang Kyo-ahn (2017) Yoo Il-ho (acting: 2017) Lee Nak-yon (2017–2020) Chung Sye-kyun (2020–2021) Hong Nam-ki (acting: 2021) Kim Boo-kyum (2021–2022)	Moon Jae-in (2017–2022)
55		Kim Dong-yeon 김동연 金東兗 (born 1952)	9 June 2017	10 December 2018	Minister of Economy and Finance	Hwang Kyo-ahn (2017) Yoo Il-ho (acting: 2017) Lee Nak-yon (2017–2020) Chung Sye-kyun (2020–2021) Hong Nam-ki (acting: 2021) Kim Boo-kyum (2021–2022)	Moon Jae-in (2017–2022)
56		Kim Sang-gon 김상곤 金相坤 (born 1949)	4 July 2017	2 October 2018	Minister of Education	Hwang Kyo-ahn (2017) Yoo Il-ho (acting: 2017) Lee Nak-yon (2017–2020) Chung Sye-kyun (2020–2021) Hong Nam-ki (acting: 2021) Kim Boo-kyum (2021–2022)	Moon Jae-in (2017–2022)
57		Yoo Eun-hae 유은혜 兪銀惠 (born 1962)	2 October 2018	9 May 2022	Minister of Education	Hwang Kyo-ahn (2017) Yoo Il-ho (acting: 2017) Lee Nak-yon (2017–2020) Chung Sye-kyun (2020–2021) Hong Nam-ki (acting: 2021) Kim Boo-kyum (2021–2022)	Moon Jae-in (2017–2022)
58		Hong Nam-ki 홍남기 洪楠基 (born 1960)	10 December 2018	9 May 2022	Minister of Economy and Finance	Hwang Kyo-ahn (2017) Yoo Il-ho (acting: 2017) Lee Nak-yon (2017–2020) Chung Sye-kyun (2020–2021) Hong Nam-ki (acting: 2021) Kim Boo-kyum (2021–2022)	Moon Jae-in (2017–2022)
59		Choo Kyung-ho 추경호 秋慶鎬 (born 1960)	10 May 2022	28 December 2023	Minister of Economy and Finance	Kim Boo-kyum (2022) Choo Kyung-ho (acting: 2022) Han Duck-soo (2022–2025) Choi Sang-mok (acting: 2024–2025) Lee Ju-ho (acting: 2025)	Yoon Suk Yeol (2022–2025) Han Duck-soo (acting: 2024–2025) Choi Sang-mok (acting: 2024–2025) Han Duck-soo (acting: 2025) Lee Ju-ho (acting: 2025)
60		Park Soon-ae 박순애 朴順愛 (born 1965)	4 July 2022	9 August 2022	Minister of Education	Kim Boo-kyum (2022) Choo Kyung-ho (acting: 2022) Han Duck-soo (2022–2025) Choi Sang-mok (acting: 2024–2025) Lee Ju-ho (acting: 2025)	Yoon Suk Yeol (2022–2025) Han Duck-soo (acting: 2024–2025) Choi Sang-mok (acting: 2024–2025) Han Duck-soo (acting: 2025) Lee Ju-ho (acting: 2025)
61		Lee Ju-ho 이주호 李周浩 (born 1961)	7 November 2022	4 June 2025	Minister of Education	Kim Boo-kyum (2022) Choo Kyung-ho (acting: 2022) Han Duck-soo (2022–2025) Choi Sang-mok (acting: 2024–2025) Lee Ju-ho (acting: 2025)	Yoon Suk Yeol (2022–2025) Han Duck-soo (acting: 2024–2025) Choi Sang-mok (acting: 2024–2025) Han Duck-soo (acting: 2025) Lee Ju-ho (acting: 2025)
62		Choi Sang-mok 최상목 崔相穆 (born 1963)	29 December 2023	1 May 2025	Minister of Economy and Finance	Kim Boo-kyum (2022) Choo Kyung-ho (acting: 2022) Han Duck-soo (2022–2025) Choi Sang-mok (acting: 2024–2025) Lee Ju-ho (acting: 2025)	Yoon Suk Yeol (2022–2025) Han Duck-soo (acting: 2024–2025) Choi Sang-mok (acting: 2024–2025) Han Duck-soo (acting: 2025) Lee Ju-ho (acting: 2025)
(61)		Lee Ju-ho 이주호 李周浩 (born 1961)	4 June 2025	29 July 2025	Minister of Education	Lee Ju-ho (acting: 2025) Kim Min-seok (2025–2026)	Lee Jae Myung (since 2025)
63		Koo Yun-cheol 구윤철 具潤哲 (born 1965)	18 July 2025	1 July 2026	Minister of Economy and Finance	Lee Ju-ho (acting: 2025) Kim Min-seok (2025–2026)	Lee Jae Myung (since 2025)
64		Choi Kyo-jin 최교진 崔敎振 (born 1953)	11 September 2025	30 September 2025	Minister of Education	Lee Ju-ho (acting: 2025) Kim Min-seok (2025–2026)	Lee Jae Myung (since 2025)
65		Bae Kyung-hoon 배경훈 裵慶勳 (born 1976)	1 October 2025	1 July 2026	Minister of Science and ICT	Lee Ju-ho (acting: 2025) Kim Min-seok (2025–2026)	Lee Jae Myung (since 2025)
(63)		Koo Yun-cheol 구윤철 具潤哲 (born 1965)	1 July 2026	22 September 2026	Minister of Economy and Finance	Han Seong-sook (since 2026)	Lee Jae Myung (since 2025)
(65)		Bae Kyung-hoon 배경훈 裵慶勳 (born 1976)	1 July 2026	Incumbent	Minister of Science and ICT	Han Seong-sook (since 2026)	Lee Jae Myung (since 2025)
66		Lee Hyoung-il 이형일 李炯日 (born 1971)	22 September 2026	Incumbent	Minister of Economy and Finance	Han Seong-sook (since 2026)	Lee Jae Myung (since 2025)

== See also ==
- Prime Minister of South Korea
- List of prime ministers of South Korea
- Politics of South Korea
