= Kim Yongjin =

South Korean politician (born 1961)

- 김용진

CEO of the National Pension Service
- In office 31 August 2020 – 18 April 2022
- President: Moon Jae-in
- Minister: Park Neung-hoo
- Preceded by: Kim Sung-joo

2nd Vice Minister of Economy and Finance
- In office 9 June 2017 – 14 December 2018
- President: Moon Jae-in
- Minister: Kim Dong-yeon; Hong Nam-ki
- Preceded by: Song Eon-seok
- Succeeded by: Koo Yun-cheol

CEO of Korea East West Power Co., Ltd
- In office 26 January 2016 – 8 June 2017
- President: Park Geun-hye
- Minister: Joo Hyung-whan
- Succeeded by: Park Il-joon

Personal details
- Born: 27 November 1961 (age 64) Icheon, South Korea
- Party: Democratic
- Education: SKKU; KDI School of Public Policy and Management

Kim Yong-jin (Korean: 김용진; Hanja: 金容振; born 27 November 1961) is a South Korean politician who served as the CEO and chairman of National Pension Service from 2020 to 2022 and previously as President Moon Jae-in's first 2nd Vice Minister of Economy and Finance.

After passing the state exam in 1986, Kim has dedicated his career in public service - mostly at government agencies and roles related to budgeting and economy.

From 1986 to 2012, Kim worked at now-Ministry of Economy and Finance, president-elect Lee Myung-bak's transition team and South Korean embassy in the UK as their officials on various policy areas from international economy to public fund management.

In 2013 he was promoted as the spokesperson of the Ministry and later in 2015 reshuffled to the chair of Executive Office, de facto Secretary-General, of Presidential Committee on Regional Development (now Presidential Committee for Balanced National Development) under then-president Park Geun-hye. In January 2016 he was appointed as the CEO and chairman of Korea East-West Power Company, a government-owned electricity company managed by now-Ministry of Trade, Industry and Energy.

Upon beginning of President Moon Jae-in's presidency in 2017, Kim was appointed as one of two deputy heads of the Ministry. During his service as the 2nd Vice Minister of Economy and Finance, he became known to the public for shedding tears when the opposition party parliamentarians at the budget hearing attempted to cut the funds for the single parent households. In December 2018 he resigned from the post for upcoming election in April 2020.

In the 2020 general election, Kim ran as a Democratic candidate for Icheon, his hometown. Kim Dong-yeon, former Minister of Economy and Finance who worked with him, made the first political move after leaving the public service as finance minister in 2018 by joining Kim's campaign. He lost to the incumbent parliamentarian from the opposition party, Song Seok-joon (Korean: 송석준).

In August 2020 he was appointed as the head of National Pension Service by the President Moon upon nomination of Minister of Health and Welfare Park Neung-hoo. In 2022 Kim resigned and joined the campaign of his former boss, Kim Dong-yeon, running for Gyeonggi Province Governor.

Kim holds two degrees - a bachelor in education from Sungkyunkwan University and a Master of Public Policy from KDI School of Public Policy and Management.

== Electoral history ==
Election	Year	District	Party affiliation	Votes	Percentage of votes	Results
21st National Assembly General Election	2020	Gyeonggi Icheon	Democratic Party	49,682	45.68%	Lost (2nd)
