= Koo Yun-cheol =

South Korean civil servant (born 1965)

- 구윤철
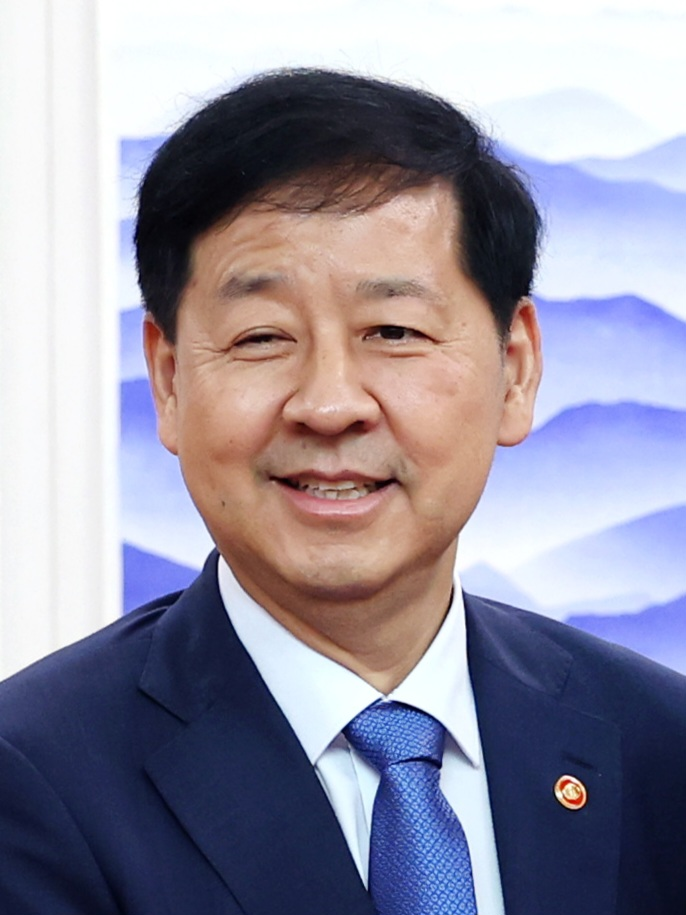
- Koo in 2025

Deputy Prime Minister and Minister of Economy and Finance
- In office 19 July 2025 – 21 September 2026
- President: Lee Jae Myung
- Prime Minister: Kim Min-seok; Han Seong-sook
- Preceded by: Choi Sang-mok; Kim Beom-seok (acting)
- Succeeded by: Lee Hyoung-il

Minister for Government Policy Coordination
- In office 9 May 2020 – 6 June 2022
- President: Moon Jae-in; Yoon Suk Yeol
- Prime Minister: Chung Sye-kyun; Hong Nam-ki (acting); Kim Boo-kyum; Choo Kyung-ho (acting); Han Duck-soo
- Preceded by: Noh Hyeong-ouk
- Succeeded by: Bang Moon-kyu

2nd Vice Minister of Economy and Finance
- In office 15 December 2018 – 8 May 2020
- President: Moon Jae-in
- Minister: Hong Nam-ki
- Preceded by: Kim Yongjin
- Succeeded by: Ahn Il-hwan

Personal details
- Born: 1 June 1965 (age 61) Seongju, North Gyeongsang, South Korea
- Party: Independent
- Spouse: Min Mi-young
- Education: Seoul National University; University of Wisconsin–Madison; Chung-Ang University
- Occupation: Government official

Korean name
- Hangul: 구윤철
- RR: Gu Yuncheol
- MR: Ku Yunch'ŏl

Koo Yun-cheol (Korean: 구윤철, born 1 June 1965) is a South Korean government official who had served as the Minister of economy and finance from July 2025 to September 2026. He previously served as the Vice Minister of economy and finance from 2018 to 2020 and as the Minister for government policy coordination from 2020 to 2022.

== Career ==
After qualifying for the Public Administration Examination, he had been involved in various positions within the Ministry of Economy and Finance (including the predecessor Ministry of Planning and Budget). He also used to work at the Office of the President under the former President Roh Moo-hyun. During the presidency of Lee Myung-bak, he was a senior secretary of the Inter-American Development Bank.

Following the inauguration of the President Moon Jae-in, Koo became the Chief of Budget Office within the Ministry of Economy and Finance. He was promoted to the deputy head of the Ministry in December 2018.

Prior to the 2020 election, Koo was one of the potential candidate in Daegu-North Gyeongsang area. He, however, declined to run, citing, "I'm neither willing, nor not in a situation to run."

On 8 May 2020, Koo was appointed the new Minister for Government Policy Coordination.

Koo has been widely considered as the potential Deputy Prime Minister. On 18 July 2025, President Lee Jae Myung endorsed the appointment of Koo as the Deputy Prime Minister and Minister of Economy and Finance.

== Education ==
Koo is a graduate of Youngshin High School and read economics at Seoul National University. He obtained a master's degree in public policy at the University of Wisconsin–Madison, and a doctorate in business administration at Chung-Ang University.
