= Yoo Sang-im =

South Korean scientist (born 1959)

- 유상임
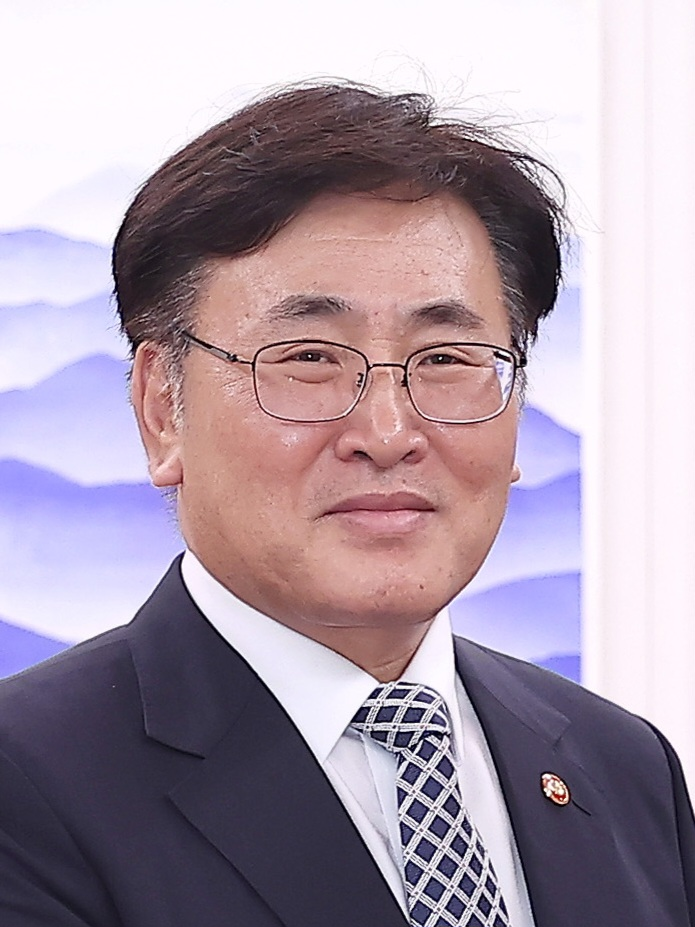

5th Minister of Science and ICT
- In office 16 August 2024 – 16 July 2025
- President: Yoon Suk Yeol
- Prime Minister: Han Duck-soo
- Preceded by: Lee Jong-ho
- Succeeded by: Bae Kyung-hoon

Personal details
- Born: 10 October 1959 (age 66) Yeongwol, Gangwon
- Party: Independent
- Education: Seoul National University

Korean name
- Hangul: 유상임
- RR: Yu Sangim
- MR: Yu Sangim

Yoo Sang-im (Korean: 유상임; born 10 October 1959) is a South Korean politician who served as the fifth minister of science and ICT from 2024 to 2025. He previously served as a professor of material engineering at Seoul National University. He is known for his expertise in Superconductors and Magnetic materials.

== Career ==
He received his bachelor's degree from Seoul National University in 1982 and his doctorate in materials engineering from Iowa State University in 1992. He worked as a postdoc at the Ames Research Center from 1992 to 1993, and he also led several academic societies including the Korean Society for Superconductivity and Low Temperature and the Korean Ceramic Society.

=== Minister of Science and ICT ===
On 17 July 2024, South Korean President Yoon Suk Yeol appointed Yoo as the new Minister of Science and ICT. After being nominated, he said:

"I will spare no effort to help our nation lead the way, while appropriately responding to fields that are undergoing rapid change in the era of the fourth industrial revolution."

— Yoo Sang-im,

He also said he felt a big responsibility to reform the country's research and development system to make it a global leader in cutting-edge technologies.

== See also ==
- Cabinet of Yoon Suk Yeol
