= Kwon O-kyu =

South Korean politician (born 1952)

Deputy Prime Minister and Minister of Economy and Finance
- In office 18 July 2006 – 29 February 2008
- President: Roh Moo-hyun
- Prime Minister: Han Myeong-sook; Han Duck-soo
- Preceded by: Kim Shin-il
- Succeeded by: Kim Byong-joon; Kim Shin-il

Acting Prime Minister of South Korea
- In office 7 March 2007 – 2 April 2007
- President: Roh Moo-hyun
- Deputy: Kim Shin-il
- Preceded by: Han Myeong-sook
- Succeeded by: Han Duck-soo

Personal details
- Born: 17 August 1952 (age 74) Gangneung, South Korea
- Education: Seoul National University (BA); University of Minnesota (MA); Chung-Ang University (PhD)

Korean name
- Hangul: 권오규
- Hanja: 權五奎
- RR: Gwon Ogyu
- MR: Kwŏn Ogyu

Kwon O-kyu (Korean: 권오규; born 17 August 1952) is a South Korean politician who served as the deputy prime minister and minister of economy and finance of South Korea from 2006 to 2008. He served as the acting prime minister of South Korea from March to April 2007.

== Finance Minister ==
As the finance minister during the Roh Moo-hyun government, he has emphasized that Korea will remove discriminatory rules that have made it difficult for domestic companies and funds to invest abroad.

== See also ==
- Deputy Prime Minister of South Korea
- Ministry of Economy and Finance (South Korea)
