= Chung Jai-suk =

South Korean politician (born 1930)

- 정재석

Acting Prime Minister of South Korea (de facto)
- In office 21 April 1994 – 30 April 1994
- Preceded by: Lee Hoi-chang
- Succeeded by: Lee Yung-dug

Deputy Prime Minister of South Korea
- In office 21 December 1993 – 5 October 1994
- Preceded by: Han Wan-sang
- Succeeded by: Lee Yung-dug

Minister of Trade, Industry and Resources
- In office 13 December 1979 – 5 July 1980
- Preceded by: Choi Gak-kyu
- Succeeded by: Shin Byeong-hyun

Personal details
- Born: 5 May 1930 (age 96) Jangsu County, North Jeolla Province, South Korea
- Spouse: Park Jin-sook
- Children: Chung Ga-young; Chung Dae-won
- Education: Seoul National University School of Law

Chung Jai-suk (Korean: 정재석; born 5 May 1930) is a retired South Korean politician, who held several important positions during the late 20th century.

== Life and career ==
Chung was born in Jangsu, North Jeolla Province on 5 May 1930. He is the older brother of former politician, businessman and lawmaker Jeong Jang-hyeon (1939–2021). He attended Seoul National University School of Law in 1955 and shortly after pursued a political career. He went on to serve as Minister of Trade, Industry and Resources from December 1979 to July 1980, representing South Korea. He met with Singaporean politician Goh Chok Tong during his tenure for a five day visit, in which he supposedly discussed economic strategies and bilateral trades. He later resigned as Transport Minister, to serve as Deputy Prime Minister from 21 December 1993 to 5 October 1994 when he resigned, citing poor health. He also briefly served as the de facto Acting Prime Minister following Lee Hoi-chang's resignation, with very limited powers during a state of vacancy from 21 April 1994 to 30 April 1994, in which he performed minimal administrative and caibnet duties for 9 days until Lee Yung-dug assumed office.

He is currently retired from public life as of June 2017. He is currently the second oldest living Prime Minister of South Korea after Lee Hyun-jae.
