= Choi Sang-mok =

South Korean politician (born 1963)

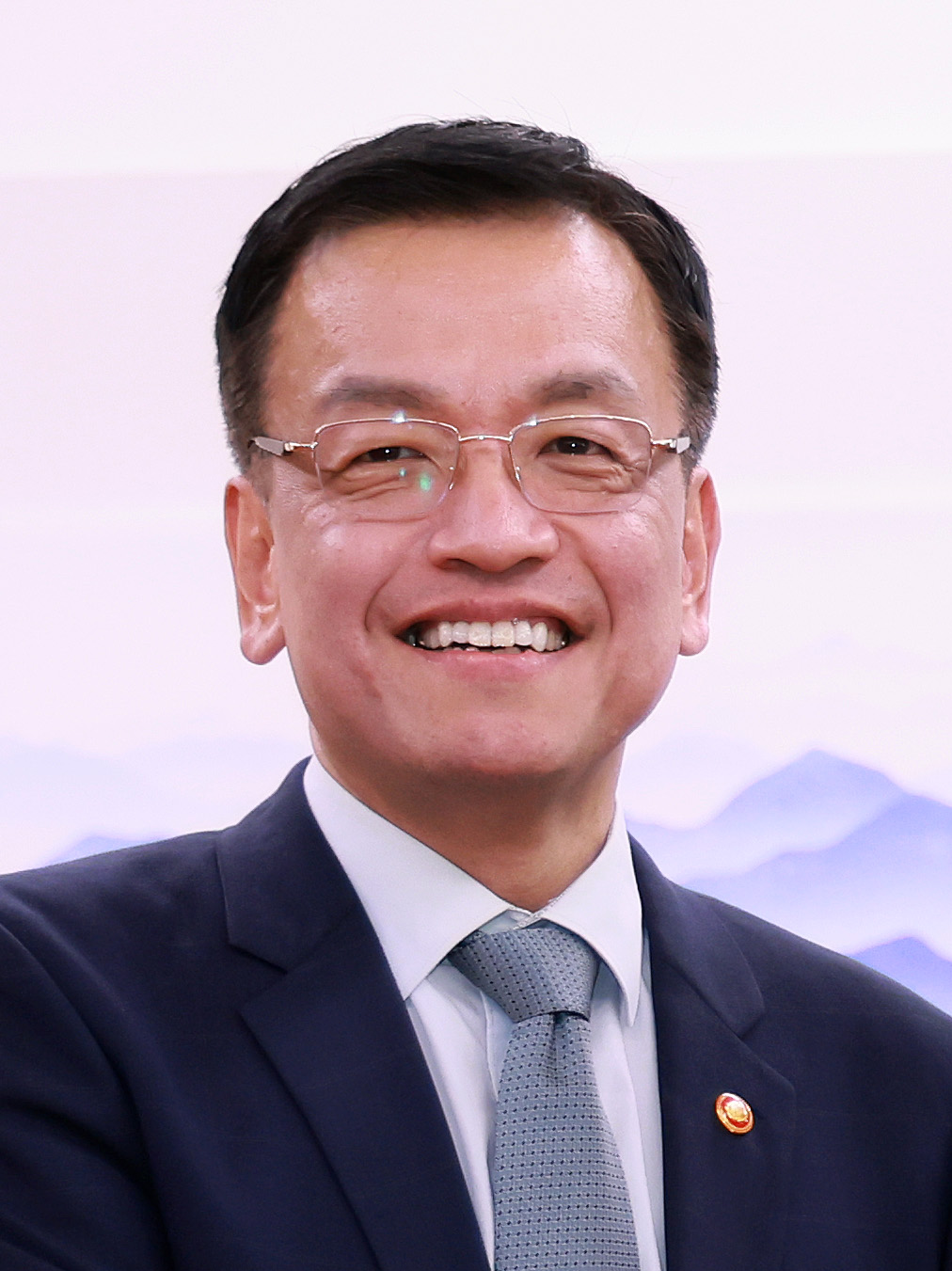
- Choi in 2024

Acting President of South Korea
- In office 27 December 2024 – 24 March 2025
- President: Yoon Suk Yeol (suspended)
- Prime Minister: Himself (acting)
- Preceded by: Han Duck-soo (acting) (Note: Yoon's powers and duties were suspended due to his impeachment and trial; Choi succeeded Han, who had originally assumed those powers and duties as acting president, due to Han's own impeachment.)
- Succeeded by: Han Duck-soo (acting)

Acting Prime Minister of South Korea
- In office 27 December 2024 – 24 March 2025
- President: Yoon Suk Yeol; Himself (acting)
- Deputy: Lee Ju-ho; Himself
- Preceded by: Han Duck-soo
- Succeeded by: Han Duck-soo

Deputy Prime Minister and Minister of Economy and Finance
- In office 29 December 2023 – 1 May 2025
- Prime Minister: Han Duck-soo; Himself (acting); Han Duck-soo
- Preceded by: Choo Kyung-ho
- Succeeded by: Kim Beom-seok (acting); Koo Yun-cheol
Additional offices
Senior Secretary for Economic Affairs
In office 10 May 2022 – 3 December 2023
President	Yoon Suk Yeol
Preceded by	Park Won-ju
Succeeded by	Park Choon-seop
Vice Minister of Strategy and Finance
In office 18 January 2016 – 31 May 2017
Prime Minister	Hwang Kyo-ahn; Yoo Il-ho (acting)
Minister	Yoo Il-ho
Secretary for Economic Affairs and Finance
In office September 2014 – January 2016
Prime Minister	Chung Hong-won; Lee Wan-koo; Hwang Kyo-ahn

Personal details
- Born: 7 June 1963 (age 63) Seoul, South Korea
- Party: Independent
- Spouse: Choi Jeong-seon (최정선)
- Education: Seoul National University (LLB, MPA); Cornell University (PhD)

Military service
- Allegiance: South Korea
- Branch/service: Republic of Korea Army

Korean name
- Hangul: 최상목
- Hanja: 崔相穆
- RR: Choe Sangmok
- MR: Ch'oe Sangmok
- Choi Sang-mok's voice Choi Sang-mok discusses the country's political crisis following the 2024 South Korean martial law declaration Recorded 13 January 2025

Choi Sang-mok (Korean: 최상목, born 7 June 1963) is a South Korean politician who served as the acting president and acting prime minister of South Korea from December 2024 to March 2025, following the impeachment of Han Duck-soo, which was subsequently overturned by the Constitutional Court.

Choi served as the deputy prime minister and the minister of economy and finance from December 2023 to May 2025. Choi was initially expected to assume the acting presidency and prime ministership again on 2 May, when Han resigned to run for president, but resigned on the night of 1 May, ahead of an anticipated impeachment vote in the National Assembly. Therefore, Deputy Prime Minister and Minister of Education Lee Ju-ho assumed the acting presidency.

== Early life and education ==
Choi was born on 7 June 1963 in Seoul, South Korea. After graduating from Osan High School (72nd), he entered Seoul National University School of Law (Class of 82) in 1982, chose the Department of Law in his second year, and passed the 29th Public Administration Examination in 1985. In June 1996, he received his PhD in economics from Cornell University, specializing in macroeconomics.

== Early career ==
Choi enlisted in the Army on 13 October 1986 after being adjudicated as a six-month National Guard, as he was the only male heir of his father. He served as an administrative soldier (general administrative specialty) in the Army Headquarters Command Office, and was demobilized as a private on 12 April 1987.

Since then, he served as an official of the Ministry of Economic Affairs, serving as the Director of the Securities System Division of the Ministry of Finance and Economy (Level 3), the Director of the Financial Policy Division / the Director of the Public Funds Management Committee of the Financial Services Commission (Level 2), the Director of the Policy Coordination Bureau of the Ministry of Strategy and Finance, the Director of the Economic Policy Bureau, and the Director of the Policy Cooperation Office of the Ministry of Strategy and Finance (Level 1).

== Political career before the Yoon administration ==
=== Vice Minister (2014–2017) ===
From October 2013 to July 2014, he served as Vice Prime Minister for Economic Affairs and Policy Advisor to the Minister of Strategy and Finance, and in July 2014, he served as Secretary for Economy and Finance in the Office of the Chief Economic Officer of the Presidential Secretariat. He returned to the Ministry of Finance and was promoted to vice minister and served as the first vice minister of the Ministry of Strategy and Finance until May 2017, when the Moon Jae-in government took office.

=== Private career (2019–2020) ===
On 22 March 2019, he was appointed as an outside director of Ildong Holdings, and as of 12 March 2020, he was appointed as an outside director of Shinhan Securities.

As of 24 March 2020, he was appointed as the 26th president of the Agricultural Cooperative College.

== Deputy Premiership and Minister of Economy and Finance (2022–2025) ==
=== Deputy Premiership ===
In March 2022, after Yoon Suk-yeol was elected president, Choi participated in the 20th Presidential Transition Committee as a secretary of the Economy 1 Division. When he served as the secretary of the transition committee, he attracted attention as a candidate for the first deputy prime minister and minister of economy and finance of the Yoon Suk-yeol government and chairman of the Financial Services Commission along with Rep. Choo Kyung-ho and former head of the Office of State Affairs Coordination. However, he was appointed to the post of Chief Economic Secretary in the Office of the President.

=== Minister of Economy and Finance ===
After being appointed deputy prime minister and minister of strategy and finance by President Yoon Suk Yeol, Choi told a news conference that strengthening efforts to stabilize people's livelihoods would be the most important priority under his leadership. He was one of Yoon's conservative loyalists, but openly opposed Yoon's martial law plan.

== Acting presidency and premiership (2024–2025) ==
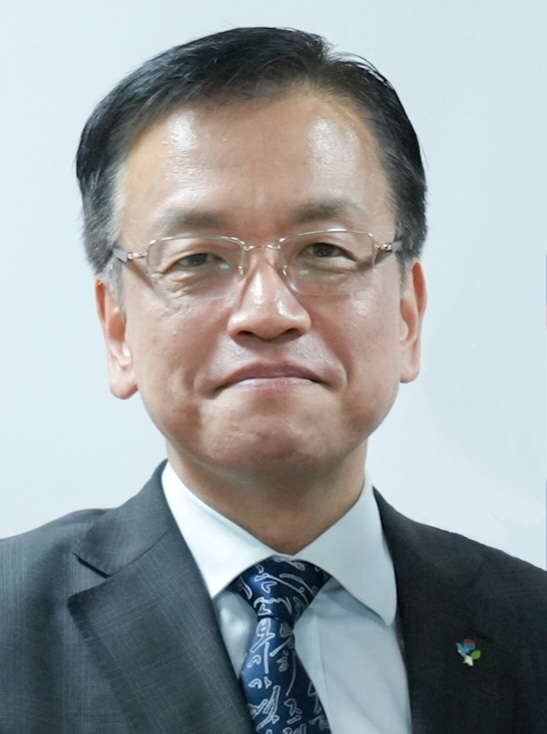
- Acting presidency of Choi Sang-mok; 27 December 2024 – 24 March 2025
- Prime Minister: Himself (acting)
- Cabinet: Full list
- Party: Independent
- Seat: Seoul

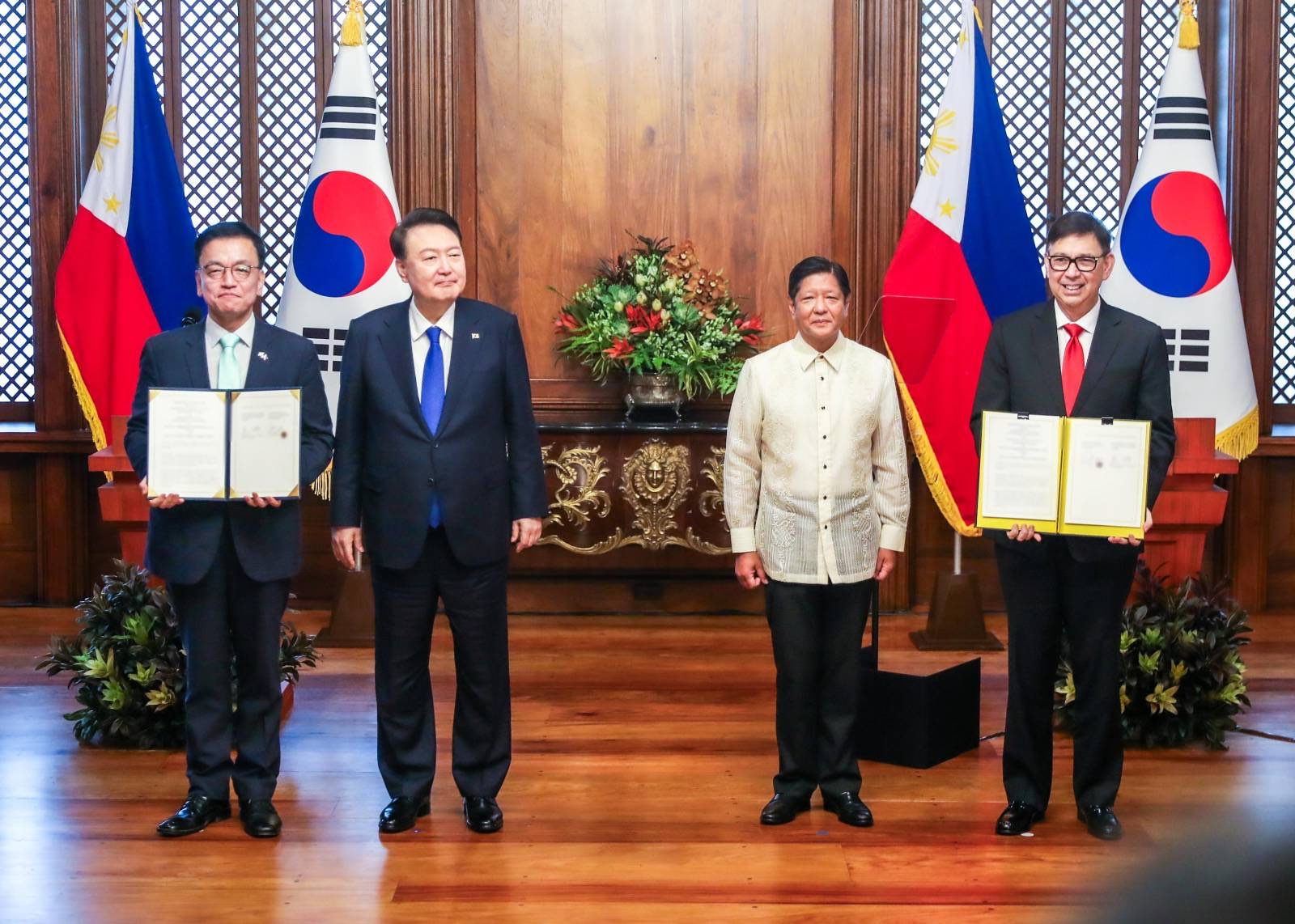
Choi with South Korean President Yoon Suk Yeol and Philippine President Bongbong Marcos in Manila on 7 October 2024

Upon the impeachment of Prime Minister of South Korea and concurrent acting president Han Duck-soo on 27 December 2024, he became both acting president and acting prime minister of South Korea.

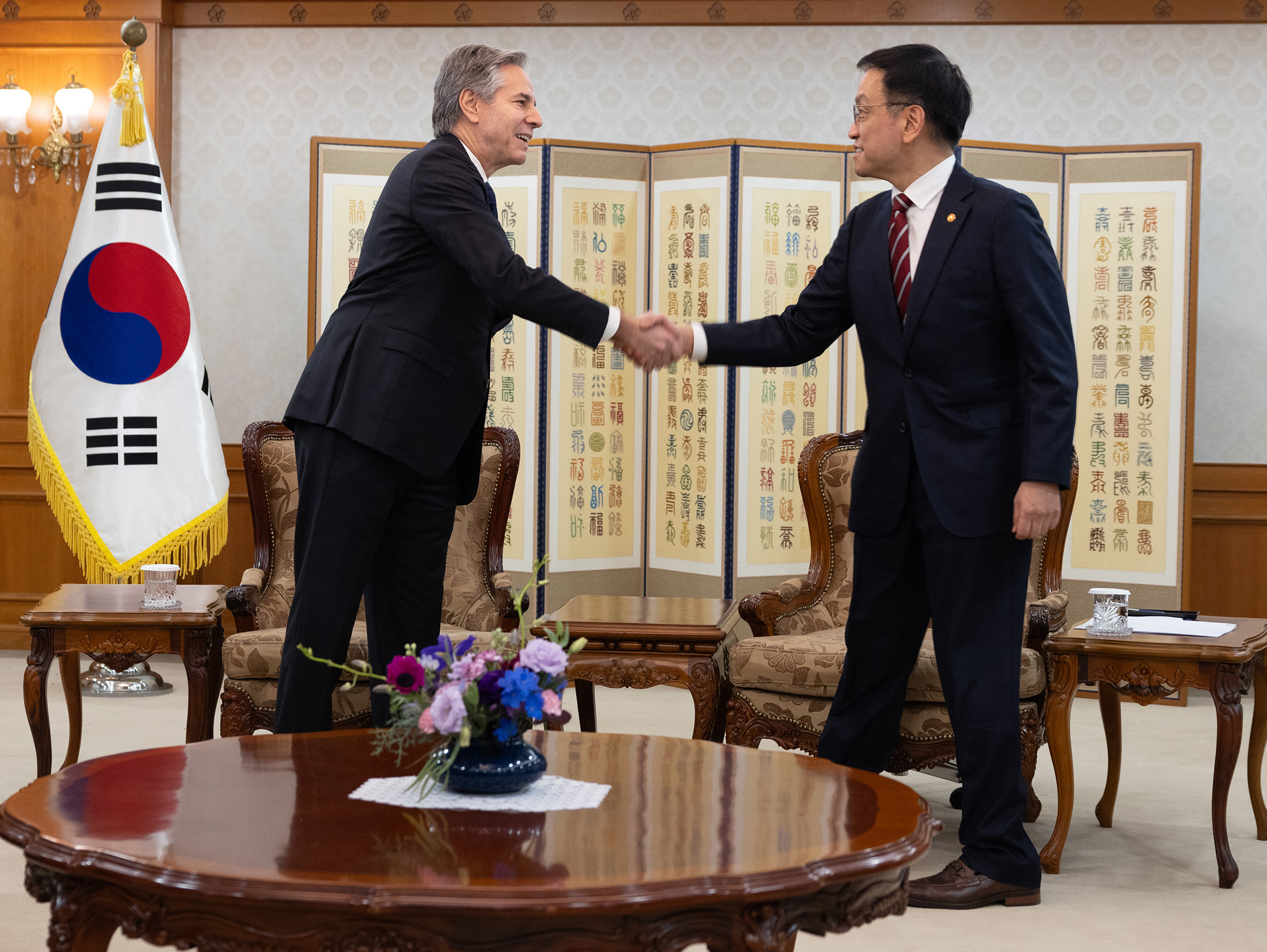
Choi meets United States Secretary of State Antony Blinken on 6 January 2025 in Seoul

The crash of Jeju Air Flight 2216, the deadliest plane crash to occur on South Korean soil, occurred only two days into Choi's acting presidency. One of his first acts was to formally declare Muan County, where the disaster occurred, as a special disaster zone. He also ordered an emergency review of South Korea's aircraft operation systems.

On 31 December 2024, Choi appointed Chung Kyesun and Cho Hanchang to the Constitutional Court of Korea as part of efforts to fill vacancies in the court, an issue that contributed to Han's impeachment when he refused to fill three vacancies in the chamber. The appointments were criticised by both the ruling People Power Party, which opposed him making any appointments to the court at all, and the opposition Democratic Party (DPK), which cited his refusal to appoint a third nominee, Ma Eun-hyuk, which Choi based on the lack of bipartisan support for the latter's nomination. The appointments also led to a mass resignation of senior officials associated with impeached president Yoon Suk Yeol in the presidential office, which said that the move "goes beyond the authorities of an interim leader". However, Choi rejected the resignations. At the same time, Choi vetoed two special counsel bills that sought to investigate Yoon Suk Yeol and his wife Kim Keon Hee over his martial law declaration and charges of corruption. He also vetoed a revised version of the bill in January 2025, citing a lack of bipartisan consensus, and another bill in March that sought to investigate Yoon over an influence-peddling scandal during a parliamentary by-election in 2022.

Choi was also criticised over his role in the failed attempt to arrest Yoon Suk Yeol at his residence on 3 January 2025, with the DPK accusing him of obstructing Yoon's arrest by allowing the Presidential Security Service to block the Corruption Investigation Office for High-ranking Officials from implementing its arrest warrant on Yoon.

On 6 February, Choi was questioned by the National Assembly over a memorandum he received from Yoon Suk Yeol ordering the creation of a budget for an emergency legislative body which was to have been created during martial law.

On 27 February, the Constitutional Court ruled that acting Chief Justice Choi's decision to withhold Ma Eun-hyuk's appointment to the Constitutional Court violated the National Assembly's right to elect a justice to the court but dismissed a petition to have Ma appointed immediately.

Choi meets up with Democratic Party leader Lee Jae Myung to discuss South Korea's political crisis following the 2024 South Korean martial law declaration

On 18 March, Choi vetoed a bill that would have overhauled decision-making processes at the Korea Communications Commission, citing "significant unconstitutional elements" and concerns over the stability of the KCC's operations.

Following the overturning of Han Duck-soo's impeachment by the Constitutional Court on 24 March, Choi was relieved of his duties as acting president and prime minister.

=== Impeachment attempt ===
On 21 March 2025, the DPK and four other opposition parties submitted a motion in the National Assembly to impeach Choi, citing his refusal to appoint justices to the Constitutional Court. The petitioners also charged Choi with abetting Yoon's martial law declaration in December 2024, failing to appoint a National Assembly-backed independent prosecutor to look into possible insurrection by Yoon despite the legislature passing a resolution to do so, and failing to act on the application of a nominee to the Supreme Court of Korea.

After Choi reverted to his previous position as finance minister, the impeachment motion was reported to the plenary of the National Assembly on 2 April 2025. However, Choi resigned minutes before the chamber was set to vote on the motion on 1 May, prompting the suspension of the proceedings. His departure reduced the number of members in the governing cabinet to 14, below the minimum 15 needed for it to convene under the constitution.

==== Travel ban ====
On 27 May 2025, both Choi and former Prime Minister Han were barred from traveling abroad after being named as a suspect in the insurrection case against Yoon Suk Yeol over his martial law declaration, after CC-TV footage of Han conversing with former Defense Minister Kim the day of the martial law declaration was discovered. On 11 December 2025, Choi was indicted on charges of failing to fill the vacancies at the Constitutional Court during Yoon's impeachment and lying during Han's trial.

== Personal life ==
Choi is married to Choi Jeong-seon.

== See also ==
- Cabinet of Yoon Suk Yeol

== Notes ==
Political offices
Preceded by Choo Kyung-ho	Minister of Economy and Finance; 29 December 2023 – 1 May 2025	Succeeded by Kim Beom-seok (Acting); Koo Yun-cheol
Preceded by Han Duck-soo (Acting)	President of South Korea (Acting); Acting for Yoon Suk Yeol: 27 December 2024 – 24 March 2025	Succeeded by Han Duck-soo (Acting)
Preceded by Han Duck-soo	Prime Minister of South Korea (Acting); Acting for Han Duck-soo: 27 December 2024 – 24 March 2025	Succeeded by Han Duck-soo
