= MOEF =

MOEF may refer to:

- Mid-Ocean Escort Force, the organisation of anti-submarine escorts for World War II trade convoys
- Ministry of Environment and Forests (India)
- Ministry of Economy and Finance (South Korea)
