= Minister of Finance and Economy (South Korea) =

South Korean government position

- Emblem of the Government of South Korea

- Incumbent; Lee Hyoung-il since 22 September 2026
- Ministry of Finance and Economy
- Style: His Excellency
- Member of: Cabinet of South Korea
- Reports to: President of South Korea
- Appointer: President of South Korea with approbation of the South Korea National Assembly

The Minister of Finance and Economy (Korean: 재정경제부장관) is a member of the Cabinet of South Korea and is the leader and chief executive of the Ministry of Finance and Economy. In Korea, all minister nominees are required to undergo congressional confirmation hearings, though the consent of the National Assembly is only necessary for the prime minister, who nominates cabinet ministers.

The Ministry of Finance and Economy precedes a series of historical agencies. From 1948 to 1994, the Ministry of Finance oversaw the financial affairs of the Republic of Korea. In 1961, the Economic Planning Board was created to centralize the South Korean industry under the Park Chung Hee regime. In 1994, the two agencies were merged to create the Ministry of Finance and Economy (재정경제원, 1994–1998).

Following the 1997 Asian financial crisis, the Ministry of Finance and Economy was reformed into two new agencies, the cabinet-level Ministry of Finance and Economy (재정경제부, 1998–2008) and the National Budget Administration (예산청). In 2008, the Ministry of Finance and Economy and Ministry of Budget and Planning merged together to form the Ministry of Economy and Finance. In 2026, the Lee Jae Myung administration once again divided the Ministry of Economy and Finance into the Ministry of Finance and Economy and the Ministry of Planning and Budget.

== List ==
No.	Portrait	Name (Birth–Death)	Term of office			President
No.	Portrait	Name (Birth–Death)	Took office	Left office	Time in office	President
1		Koo Yun-cheol 구윤철 具潤哲 (born 1965)	2 January 2026	22 September 2026	233 days	Lee Jae Myung
2		Lee Hyoung-il 이형일 李炯日 (born 1971)	22 September 2026	Incumbent	18 days	Lee Jae Myung

== List of ministers from preceding agencies ==
=== Minister of Finance (1948–1994) ===
No.	Portrait	Name (Birth–Death)	Term of office			President
No.	Portrait	Name (Birth–Death)	Took office	Left office	Time in office	President
1		Kim Do-yeon 김도연 金度演 (1894–1967)	2 August 1948	22 April 1950	1 year, 263 days	First Republic of Korea
2		Choi Sun-ju 최순주 崔淳周 (1902–1956)	25 April 1950	5 March 1951	314 days	First Republic of Korea
3		Baek Du-jin 백두진 白斗鎭 (1908–1993)	5 March 1951	9 September 1953	2 years, 188 days	First Republic of Korea
4		Park Hui-hyeon 박희현 朴熙賢 (1911–1999)	9 September 1953	30 June 1954	294 days	First Republic of Korea
5		Lee Jung-jyae 이중재 李重宰 (1898–1990)	30 June 1954	11 July 1955	1 year, 11 days	First Republic of Korea
6		Kim Hyeon-chul 김현철 金顯哲 (1901–1989)	11 July 1955	26 May 1956	259 days	First Republic of Korea
7		In Tae-sik 인태식 印泰植 (1902–1975)	26 May 1956	9 June 1957	1 year, 14 days	First Republic of Korea
8		Kim Hyeon-chul 김현철 金顯哲 (1901–1989)	9 June 1957	20 March 1959	1 year, 284 days	First Republic of Korea
9		Song In-sang 송인상 宋仁相 (1914–2015)	20 March 1959	28 April 1960	1 year, 39 days	First Republic of Korea
10		Yun Ho-byeong 윤호병 尹皡炳 (1891–1975)	28 April 1960	19 August 1960	113 days	First Republic of Korea
11		Kim Young-sun 김영선 金永善 (1918–1987)	23 August 1960	18 May 1961	268 days	Second Republic of Korea
12		Paik Sun-jin 백선진 白善鎭 (1922–2010)	20 May 1961	22 June 1961	33 days	Supreme Council for National Reconstruction
13		Kim Yu-taek 김유택 金裕澤 (1911–1975)	22 June 1961	16 July 1961	24 days	Supreme Council for National Reconstruction
14		Chun Byung-kyu 천병규 千炳圭 (1918–1993)	22 July 1961	16 June 1962	329 days	Supreme Council for National Reconstruction
15		Kim Se-ryun 김세련 金世鍊 (1917–1988)	18 June 1962	8 February 1963	235 days	Supreme Council for National Reconstruction
16		Hwang Jong-ryul 황종률 黃鍾律 (1909–1972)	8 February 1963	16 December 1963	311 days	Supreme Council for National Reconstruction
17		Park Dong-kyu 박동규 朴東奎 (1916–1985)	17 December 1963	26 June 1964	192 days	Third Republic of Korea
18		Rhie Jung-hwan 이정환 李廷煥 (1919–2008)	26 June 1964	5 December 1964	162 days	Third Republic of Korea
19		Hong Seung-hi 홍승희 洪升熹 (1920–2008)	5 December 1964	16 November 1965	346 days	Third Republic of Korea
20		Kim Chung-yum 김정렴 金正濂 (1924–2020)	25 November 1965	26 September 1966	305 days	Third Republic of Korea
21		Kim Hak-ryeol 김학렬 金鶴烈 (1923–1972)	26 September 1966	27 December 1966	92 days	Third Republic of Korea
22		Suh Bong-kyun 서봉균 徐奉均 (1926–2023)	27 December 1966	21 May 1968	1 year, 146 days	Third Republic of Korea
23		Hwang Jong-ryul 황종률 黃鍾律 (1909–1972)	21 May 1968	21 October 1969	1 year, 153 days	Third Republic of Korea
24		Nam Duck-woo 남덕우 南悳祐 (1924–2013)	21 October 1969	18 September 1974	4 years, 332 days	Fourth Republic of Korea
25		Kim Yong-hwan 김용환 金龍煥 (1932–2017)	18 September 1974	22 December 1978	4 years, 95 days	Fourth Republic of Korea
26		Kim Won-ki 김원기 金元基 (1924–2001)	22 December 1978	22 May 1980	1 year, 152 days	Fourth Republic of Korea
27		Lee Seung-yun 이승윤 李承潤 (1931–2020)	22 May 1980	4 January 1982	1 year, 227 days	Fourth Republic of Korea
28		Rha Woong-bae 나웅배 羅雄培 (1934–2022)	4 January 1982	24 June 1982	171 days	Fifth Republic of Korea
29		Kang Kyong-shik 강경식 姜慶植 (born 1936)	24 June 1982	15 October 1983	1 year, 113 days	Fifth Republic of Korea
30		Kim Mahn-je 김만제 金滿堤 (1934–2019)	15 October 1983	8 January 1986	2 years, 85 days	Fifth Republic of Korea
31		Chung In-yong 정인용 鄭寅用 (1934–2002)	8 January 1986	26 May 1987	1 year, 138 days	Fifth Republic of Korea
32		Sakong Il 사공일 司空壹 (born 1940)	26 May 1987	4 December 1988	1 year, 192 days	Roh Tae-woo
33		Lee Kyu-sung 이규성 李揆成 (born 1939)	5 December 1988	18 March 1990	1 year, 103 days	Roh Tae-woo
34		Chung Yung-euy 정영의 鄭永儀 (born 1937)	19 March 1990	26 May 1991	1 year, 68 days	Roh Tae-woo
35		Rhee Yong-man 이용만 李龍萬 (born 1933)	27 May 1991	24 February 1993	1 year, 273 days	Roh Tae-woo
36		Hong Jae-hyong 홍재형 洪在馨 (born 1938)	25 February 1993	4 October 1994	1 year, 221 days	Kim Young-sam
37		Park Jae-yoon 박재윤 朴在潤 (born 1941)	5 October 1994	23 December 1994	79 days	Kim Young-sam

=== Minister of Finance and Economy (1994–1998) ===
No.	Portrait	Name (Birth–Death)	Term of office			President
No.	Portrait	Name (Birth–Death)	Took office	Left office	Time in office	President
Deputy Prime Minister and Minister of Finance and Economy (1994–1998)
1		Hong Jae-hyong 홍재형 洪在馨 (born 1938)	23 December 1994	20 December 1995	362 days	Kim Young-sam
2		Rha Woong-bae 나웅배 羅雄培 (1934–2022)	20 December 1995	8 August 1996	232 days	Kim Young-sam
3		Han Seung-soo 한승수 韓昇洙 (born 1936)	8 August 1996	5 March 1997	209 days	Kim Young-sam
4		Kang Kyong-shik 강경식 姜慶植 (born 1936)	5 March 1997	19 November 1997	259 days	Kim Young-sam
5		Lim Chang-yuel 임창열 林昌烈 (born 1944)	19 November 1997	5 March 1998	106 days	Kim Young-sam

=== Minister of Finance and Economy (1998–2008) ===
No.	Portrait	Name (Birth–Death)	Term of office			President
No.	Portrait	Name (Birth–Death)	Took office	Left office	Time in office	President
Minister of Finance and Economy (1998–2001)
1		Lee Kyu-sung 이규성 李揆成 (born 1939)	5 March 1998	24 May 1999	1 year, 80 days	Kim Dae-jung
2		Kang Bong-kyun 강봉균 康奉均 (1943–2017)	24 May 1999	14 January 2000	235 days	Kim Dae-jung
3		Lee Hun-jai 이헌재 李憲宰 (born 1944)	14 January 2000	7 August 2000	206 days	Kim Dae-jung
Deputy Prime Minister and Minister of Finance and Economy (2001–2008)
1		Jin Nyum 진념 陳稔 (born 1940)	7 August 2000	15 April 2002	1 year, 251 days	Kim Dae-jung
2		Jeon Yun-churl 전윤철 田允喆 (born 1939)	15 April 2002	27 February 2003	318 days	Kim Dae-jung
3		Kim Jin-pyo 김진표 金振杓 (born 1947)	27 February 2003	10 February 2004	348 days	Roh Moo-hyun
4		Lee Hun-jai 이헌재 李憲宰 (born 1944)	10 February 2004	7 March 2005	1 year, 25 days	Roh Moo-hyun
5		Han Duck-soo 한덕수 韓悳洙 (born 1949)	14 March 2005	18 July 2006	1 year, 126 days	Roh Moo-hyun
6		Kwon O-kyu 권오규 權五奎 (born 1952)	18 July 2006	29 February 2008	1 year, 226 days	Roh Moo-hyun

=== Minister of Economy and Finance (2008–2026) ===
No.	Portrait	Name (Birth–Death)	Term of office			President
No.	Portrait	Name (Birth–Death)	Took office	Left office	Time in office	President
Minister of Economy and Finance (2008–2013)
1		Kang Man-soo 강만수 姜萬洙 (born 1945)	29 February 2008	9 February 2009	346 days	Lee Myung-bak
2		Yoon Jeung-hyun 윤증현 尹增鉉 (born 1946)	10 February 2009	1 June 2011	2 years, 111 days	Lee Myung-bak
3		Bahk Jae-wan 박재완 朴宰完 (born 1955)	2 June 2011	22 March 2013	1 year, 293 days	Lee Myung-bak
Deputy Prime Minister and Minister of Economy and Finance (2013–2025)
1		Hyun Oh-seok 현오석 玄旿錫 (born 1950)	22 March 2013	14 July 2014	1 year, 114 days	Park Geun-hye
2		Choi Kyoung-hwan 최경환 崔炅煥 (born 1955)	15 July 2014	12 January 2016	1 year, 181 days	Park Geun-hye
3		Yoo Il-ho 유일호 柳一鎬 (born 1955)	13 January 2016	8 June 2017	1 year, 146 days	Park Geun-hye
4		Kim Dong-yeon 김동연 金東兗 (born 1957)	9 June 2017	10 December 2018	1 year, 184 days	Moon Jae-in
5		Hong Nam-ki 홍남기 洪楠基 (born 1960)	11 December 2018	10 May 2022	3 years, 150 days	Moon Jae-in
6		Choo Kyung-ho 추경호 秋慶鎬 (born 1960)	10 May 2022	29 December 2023	1 year, 233 days	Yoon Suk-yeol
7		Choi Sang-mok 최상목 崔相穆 (born 1963)	29 December 2023	1 May 2025	1 year, 123 days	Yoon Suk-yeol
8		Koo Yun-cheol 구윤철 具潤哲 (born 1965)	19 July 2025	2 January 2026	167 days	Lee Jae Myung

== See also ==
- Ministry of Economy and Finance (South Korea)
- Economy of South Korea
- Bank of Korea
- Statistics Korea
- Korea Financial Investment Association
