= Lee Jong-ho (engineer) =

South Korean electrical engineer (born 1966)

- 이종호
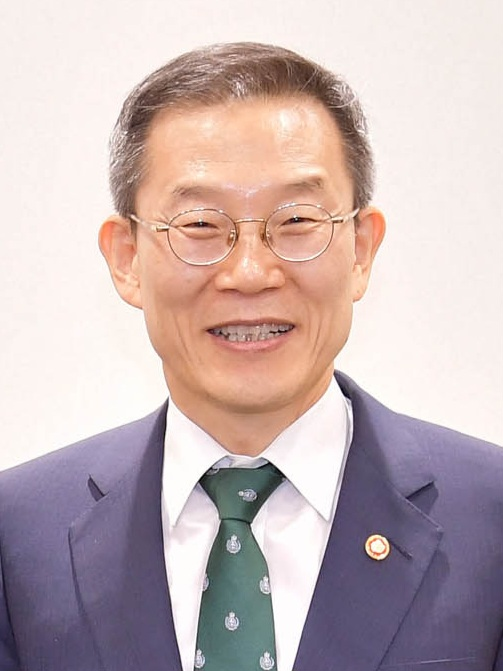

Minister of Science and ICT
- In office 10 May 2022 – 16 August 2024
- President: Yoon Suk-yeol
- Prime Minister: Han Duck-soo
- Preceded by: Lim Hye-sook
- Succeeded by: Yoo Sang-im

Personal details
- Born: April 12, 1966 (age 60) Hapcheon County, South Gyeongsang, South Korea
- Party: Independent
- Education: Kyungpook National University (BS); Seoul National University (MS, PhD)

Lee Jong-ho (Korean: 이종호; born 12 April 1966) is a South Korean electronic engineer and professor of electrical and computer engineering at Seoul National University. He served as the minister of science and ICT in the Yoon Suk-yeol government from May 2022 to August 2024.

== Awards and honors ==
In 2004, he was award the Scientist of the Month by the National Research Foundation of Korea. In 2007, the National Academy of Engineering of Korea gave him the NAEK Award. He was named Fellow of the Institute of Electrical and Electronics Engineers (IEEE) in 2016 for contributions to development and characterization of bulk multiple-gate field effect transistors. The following year he received the Kyung-Ahm Prize in Engineering.
