= Hong Nam-ki =

South Korean politician (born 1960)

- 홍남기
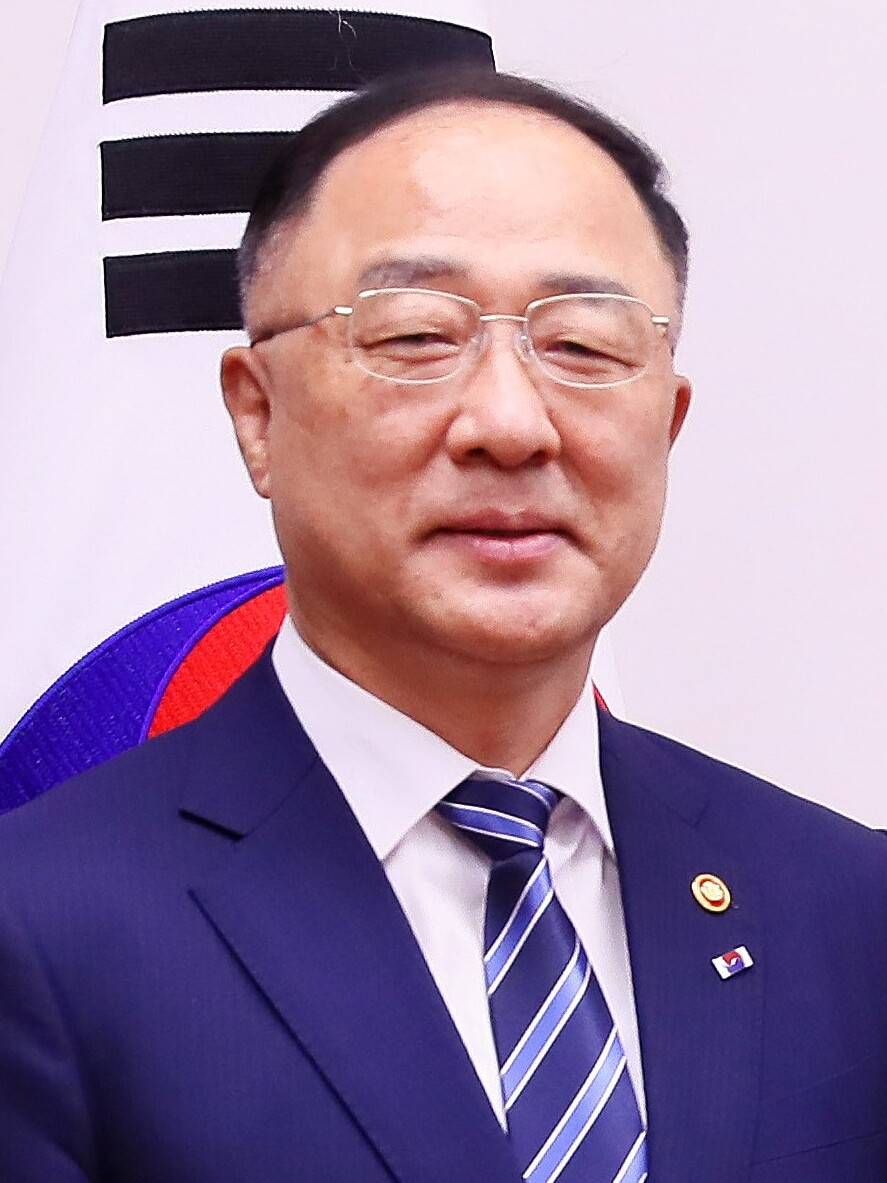
- Hong in 2020

Acting Prime Minister of South Korea
- In office 17 April 2021 – 14 May 2021
- President: Moon Jae-in
- Preceded by: Chung Sye-kyun
- Succeeded by: Kim Boo-kyum

Deputy Prime Minister and Minister of Economy and Finance
- In office 11 December 2018 – 9 May 2022
- President: Moon Jae-in
- Prime Minister: Lee Nak-yeon; Chung Sye-kyun; Himself (acting); Kim Boo-kyum
- Preceded by: Kim Dong-yeon
- Succeeded by: Choo Kyung-ho

Minister for Government Policy Coordination
- In office 11 May 2017 – 9 November 2018
- President: Moon Jae-in
- Prime Minister: Lee Nak-yeon
- Preceded by: Lee Seok-jun
- Succeeded by: Noh Hyeong-ouk

First Vice Minister of Science, ICT and Future Planning
- In office 18 January 2016 – 10 May 2017
- President: Park Geun-hye
- Prime Minister: Hwang Kyo-ahn
- Preceded by: Lee Seok-joon
- Succeeded by: Min Won-ki

Personal details
- Born: 29 July 1960 (age 66) Chuncheon, South Korea
- Relatives: See Namyang Hong clan
- Education: Hanyang University; University of Salford

Korean name
- Hangul: 홍남기
- Hanja: 洪楠基
- RR: Hong Namgi
- MR: Hong Namgi

Hong Nam-ki (Korean: 홍남기; born 29 July 1960) is a South Korean politician who served as the minister of economy and finance and deputy prime minister of South Korea from 2018 to 2022 under President Moon Jae-in. He is the longest-serving holder of the office. Hong also served as the acting prime minister from April to May 2021.

Hong is considered a veteran technocrat working at mostly at budget-related departments under both conservative and liberal governments for over three decades. Before promoted to President Moon's second finance minister, Hong was his first Minister for Government Policy Coordination (OPC) and previously president Park Geun-hye's vice minister for now-Ministry of Science and ICT.

His nomination as President Moon's next finance minister was strongly recommended by then-Prime Minister Lee Nak-yon whom Hong closely worked for as Minister for Government Policy Coordination. Hong's predecessor, Kim Dong-yeon, also served as the head of OPC under previous administration before appointed as Moon's first finance minister.

As of December 2020, Hong is also one of four people who continue to serve President Moon as cabinet minister or ministerial-level government official from the beginning of Moon's presidency in 2017 along with Kim Sang-jo, Suh Hoon, and Kang Kyung-wha.

== Policy stances ==
On several occasions, Hong expressed his disapproval of adopting universal basic income as it only significantly worsens fiscal responsibility without effectively replacing the current social safety net and for this reason it is not adopted by any countries in the world.

After the government and the ruling party led by Lee concluded not to lower the taxation threshold for "a large shareholder" from 1 billion won to 300 million won worth of stocks in a single company upon strong opposition from the both sides of the political parties, Hong submitted his resignation reasoning that "someone had to take responsibility on the debate that lasted for two months and on the current status of not lowering the threshold." President Moon immediately rejected his resignation and reaffirmed him citing that he is the right person to lead Korea's economic recovery from the COVID-19 pandemic. In response to two petitions calling for Hong's removal from office due to this "shareholder issue," the Blue House reiterated that Hong and the government have committed themselves in economic recovery.

In January 2021, Hong reiterated his stance on fiscal responsibility in response to growing discussions on the possible fourth COVID-19 relief and financial assistance to businesses affected by the pandemic. Although Korea's debt-to-GDP ratio is relatively low compared to other developed countries, cumulative debt, according to Hong, is a burden to the future generations. He also emphasised that government spending is not a "widow's cruise" and therefore must be spent wisely even in this pandemic. Moreover, in an interview, he expressed his willingness to actively participate in such discussions as he has a solemn duty as the country's finance minister to "guard the storehouse (meaning country's budget)." Even on his last day as the minister, he reiterated the importance of maintaining fiscal soundness of the country.

== Education ==
Hong graduated from Hanyang University with a bachelor's degree in economics and MBA. He also holds a master's degree in economics from University of Salford.
