= Bae Kyung-hoon =

South Korean AI researcher (born 1976)

- 배경훈
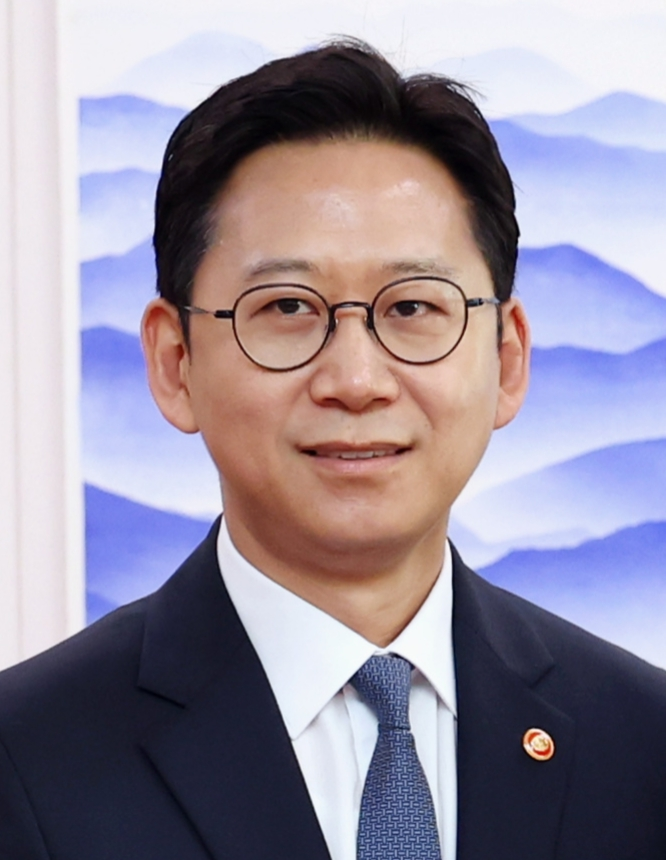
- Bae in 2025

Deputy Prime Minister and 6th Minister of Science and ICT
- Incumbent
- Assumed office 16 July 2025
- President: Lee Jae Myung
- Preceded by: Yoo Sang-im

Personal details
- Born: 1976 (age 49–50) Seoul, South Korea
- Education: Kwangwoon University (BS, MS, PhD); Columbia Southern University (MBA)
- Profession: Artificial intelligence researcher, executive

Korean name
- Hangul: 배경훈
- Hanja: 裵慶勳
- RR: Bae Gyeonghun
- MR: Pae Kyŏnghun

Bae Kyung-hoon (Korean: 배경훈; born 1976) is a South Korean artificial intelligence (AI) researcher and executive serving as the minister of science and ICT and deputy prime minister since 2025.

== Early life and education ==
Bae was born in Seoul in 1976. At Kwangwoon University, he received a bachelor's degree, a master's degree, and a PhD in electrical engineering. He attended Columbia Southern University and received a Master of Business Administration degree. At the Massachusetts Institute of Technology's Sloan Business School, he completed an executive program on AI's impact on business strategy.

== Career ==
In 2006, Bae was a senior researcher at a joint venture between Samsung Techwin and Thales. From 2011 to 2016, he was a manager at SK Telecom's research and development division. In 2016, Bae joined LG as an expert on AI. His work at the LG Economic Research Institute, LG Sciencepark, and LG Uplus involved AI, with Bae leading the AI research effort at LG Uplus. In December 2020, he become the inaugural leader of LG's AI think tank. He served as co-director of a collaboration between the think tank and Seoul National University. During his tenure, the think tank developed multiple versions of the Exaone AI model.

Bae served on the presidential AI advisory council in 2024 and on the science and technology advisory council in 2025. In June 2025, President Lee Jae Myung nominated Bae to serve as Minister of Science and ICT. Bae took office on 16 July 2025. He oversees South Korea's science and internet policies. Bae also serves as Deputy Prime Minister. Lee has supported policies that aim to grow AI in South Korea. Bae has been a strong advocate of developing AI that is wholly made and run from South Korea.

In 2023, Bae received the silver tower Order of Industrial Service Merit.
