= Kim Dong-yeon (politician) =

South Korean politician (born 1957)

- 김동연
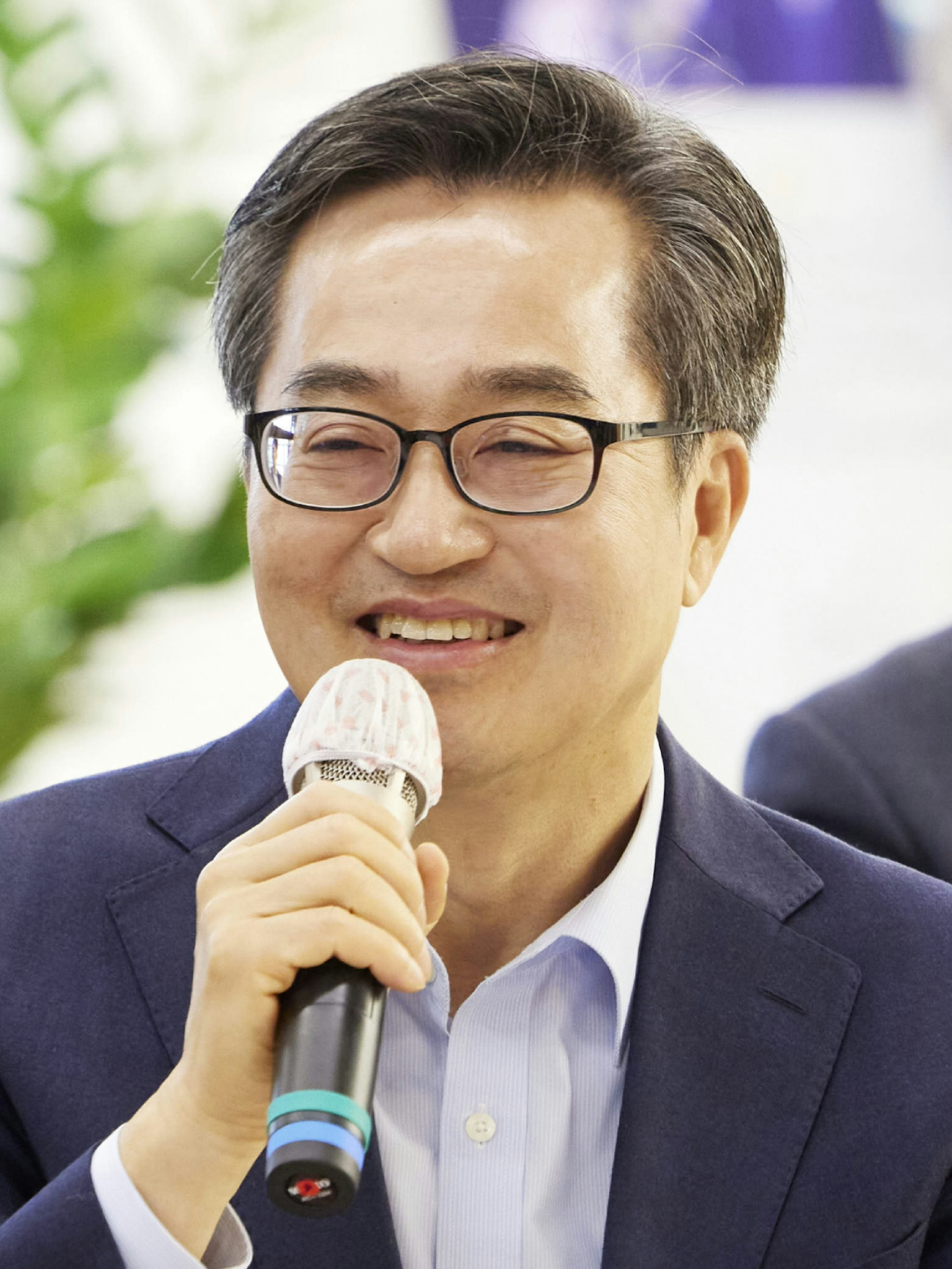
- Kim in 2025

Governor of Gyeonggi Province
- In office 1 July 2022 – 30 July 2026
- Preceded by: Lee Jae Myung (2018-2021); Oh Byeong-kwon (acting)
- Succeeded by: Choo Mi-ae

Deputy Prime Minister and Minister of Economy and Finance
- In office 9 June 2017 – 10 December 2018
- Prime Minister: Lee Nak-yeon
- Preceded by: Yoo Il-ho
- Succeeded by: Hong Nam-ki

Minister for Government Policy Coordination
- In office 25 March 2013 – 22 July 2014
- Prime Minister: Chung Hong-won
- Preceded by: Lim Jong-ryong
- Succeeded by: Choo Kyung-ho

Personal details
- Born: 28 January 1957 (age 69) Eumseong, South Korea
- Party: Democratic
- Other political affiliations: New Wave (2021–2022); Independent (until 2021)
- Education: Kookjae University (LLB); Seoul National University (MPA); University of Michigan (MPP, PhD)

Korean name
- Hangul: 김동연
- Hanja: 金東兗
- RR: Gim Dongyeon
- MR: Kim Tongyŏn

Kim Dong-yeon (Korean: 김동연; born 28 January 1957) is a South Korean politician who served as the governor of Gyeonggi Province from 2022 to 2026. He previously served as the minister of economy and finance and deputy prime minister from 2017 to 2018.

== Early life ==
Kim was born on January 28, 1957, in Eumseong, North Chungcheong Province. After completion of high school, he worked as a banker at Seoul Trust Bank (which is now Hana Bank) while completing his undergraduate degree in law at the evening school of Kookjae University.

He spent most of his time in government at Ministry of Economy and Finance and its preceding agencies where he began and ended his career in public service at.

In 1982 he passed the state exams for both legal affairs and administration and began working as a working-level administrator at its preceding agency. He took numerous economy and budgeting related roles in government ministries, Office of the President and presidential transition team.

He was recruited by three consecutive presidents. He was Lee Myung-bak's second vice finance minister and Park Geun-hye's minister for government policy coordination. Before being promoted to Moon Jae-in's first finance minister, he was the 15th president of Ajou University for two years.

Kim holds four degrees: a bachelor's degree in law from Kookjae University, two master's degrees in administration from Seoul National University and the University of Michigan and a doctorate in administration from the University of Michigan.

== Political career ==
In August 2021, Kim announced that he would run for the 2022 South Korean presidential election. He became a candidate as an independent initially and then formed his own Party, the New Wave. Kim withdrew his presidential candidacy in March 2022 after reaching an agreement with the ruling Democratic Party's Lee Jae-myung on policy coalitions and joint government operations.

In June 2022, he was elected as the 36th governor of Gyeonggi Province during the 2022 South Korean local elections by a very narrow margin of 0.15%. In April 2025, he declared his candidacy for the 2025 South Korean presidential election. He ultimately finished second in the primary to Lee Jae-myung. Later that day, Kim stated on Facebook: "I extend my gratitude to candidates Lee Jae-myung and Kim Kyeong-soo. It was an honor to compete beautifully together."

== Electoral history ==
2022 Gyeonggi gubernatorial election
Party	Candidate	Votes	%
Democratic	Kim Dong-yeon	2,827,593	49.07
People Power	Kim Eun-hye	2,818,680	48.91
Independent	Kang Yongseok	54,758	0.95
Justice	Hwang Soon-sik	38,525	0.67
Progressive	Song Young-ju	13,939	0.24
Basic Income	Seo Tae-seong	9,314	0.16
Total votes		5,762,809	100.0
Democratic hold			

=== Primary election ===
2025 South Korean presidential election Democratic Primary
Party	Candidate	Votes	%
Democratic	Lee Jae Myung	623,695	89.8
Democratic	Kim Dong-yeon	41,307	6.9
Democratic	Kim Kyoung-soo	25,512	3.4
Total votes		690,514	100.0

== Publications ==
- Kim, Dong-yeon (July 28, 2021). 대한민국 금기 깨기 [Breaking the Taboo in Korea] (in Korean). Sam & Parkers. ISBN 9791165343842.
- ———————— (May 5, 2017). 있는 자리 흩트리기 (in Korean). Sam & Parkers. ISBN 9788965704607.

Political offices
Preceded by Lee Jae Myung; Oh Byeong-kwon (acting)	Governor of Gyeonggi Province; 1 July 2022–30 June 2026	Succeeded by Choo Mi-ae
Preceded by Yoo Il-ho	Minister of Economy and Finance; 9 June 2017–10 December 2018	Succeeded by Hong Nam-ki
Preceded by Lim Jong-ryong	Minister for Government Policy Coordination; 25 February 2013–22 July 2014	Succeeded by Choo Kyung-ho
