= Lee Hyoung-il =

South Korean politician (born 1971)

- Lee in 2026

Deputy Prime Minister and Minister of Finance and Economy
- Incumbent
- Assumed office 22 September 2026
- President: Lee Jae Myung
- Prime Minister: Han Seong-sook
- Preceded by: Koo Yun-cheol

Personal details
- Born: 1971 (age 54–55) Daegu, South Korea
- Party: Independent
- Education: Seoul National University; Texas A&M University

Lee Hyoung-il (Korean: 이형일; born 1971) is a South Korean politician. An independent, he has served as deputy prime minister of South Korea and minister of finance and economy of South Korea since September 2026.
