= Choi Kyoung-hwan =

South Korean politician (born 1955)

- 최경환
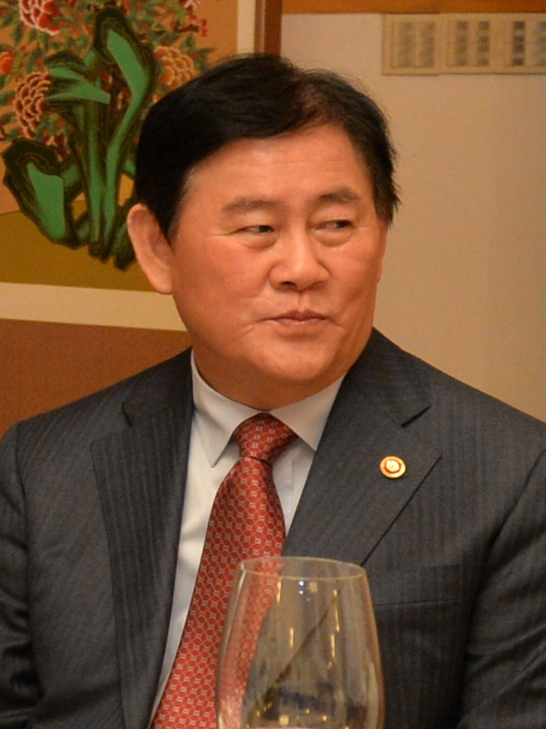
- Choi in 2014

Acting Prime Minister of South Korea
- In office 27 April 2015 – 18 June 2015
- President: Park Geun-hye
- Preceded by: Lee Wan-koo
- Succeeded by: Hwang Kyo-ahn

Deputy Prime Minister and Minister of Economy and Finance
- In office 13 June 2014 – 13 January 2016
- President: Park Geun-hye
- Prime Minister: Chung Hong-won; Lee Wan-koo; Hwang Kyo-ahn
- Preceded by: Hyun Oh-seok
- Succeeded by: Yoo Il-ho

Personal details
- Born: 22 June 1955 (age 71) Sincheon-dong, South Korea
- Party: People Power Party
- Education: Yonsei University; University of Wisconsin–Madison

- Choi Kyoung-hwan
- Hangul: 최경환
- Hanja: 崔炅煥
- RR: Choe Gyeonghwan
- MR: Ch'oe Kyŏnghwan

Choi Kyoung-hwan (Korean: 최경환; born June 22, 1955) is a South Korean politician who was a member of the National Assembly of South Korea in the Hannara Party. He represented the Gyeongsan-Cheongdo region of North Gyeongsang Province. Choi has promised to work for the extension of Daegu Subway Line 1 beyond the borders of Daegu to Gyeongsan, and to expand the Daegu Gyeongbuk Institute of Science and Technology. Choi was the acting prime minister of South Korea from 27 April 2015 to 18 June 2015, following the departure of Lee Wan-koo.

== Early life and education ==
Born in Gyeongsan's Sincheon-dong, Choi graduated from Daegu High School in 1975. He obtained his bachelor's in economics at Yonsei University, passing the civil service exam while enrolled for a fourth year of study in 1979. He later received his Ph.D. in economics at the University of Wisconsin–Madison, where he studied from 1987 to 1991.

== Career ==
His work in economics has opened up various opportunities for Choi. In 1995, he served as a researcher at the European Bank for Reconstruction and Development. In the 2002 South Korean presidential election, he was special advisor on economics to then-presidential candidate Lee Hoi-chang.

In 2018 he was jailed for 5 years for bribery.

== Election results ==
Year	Elections	Constituency	Political party	Votes (%)	Results
2004	17th National Assembly General Election	Gyeongsan–Cheongdo (North Gyeongsang)	GNP	71,196 (63.26%)	Won
2008	18th National Assembly General Election	Gyeongsan–Cheongdo (North Gyeongsang)	GNP	74,481 (78.47%)	Won
2012	19th National Assembly General Election	Gyeongsan–Cheongdo (North Gyeongsang)	Saenuri	75,876 (63.60%)	Won
2016	20th National Assembly General Election	Gyeongsan (North Gyeongsang)	Saenuri	73,646 (69.62%)	Won
2024	22nd National Assembly General Election	Gyeongsan (North Gyeongsang)	Independent	60,746 (42.27%)	Defeated (2nd)

== See also ==
- Politics of South Korea

Political offices
Preceded by Hyun Oh-seok	Minister of Economy and Finance; 2014–2016	Succeeded by Yoo Il-ho
