= Korea Customs Service =

Customs service of South Korea

- 관세청

Agency overview
- Formed: August 3, 1970; 55 years ago
- Jurisdiction: Government of South Korea
- Headquarters: Daejeon, South Korea
- Agency executive: Ko Kwang-hyo, Commissioner
- Parent agency: Ministry of Economy and Finance
- Website: customs.go.kr

Korean name
- Hangul: 관세청
- Hanja: 關稅廳
- RR: Gwansecheong
- MR: Kwansech'ŏng

The Korea Customs Service (KCS; Korean: 관세청) is the Central Administrative Agency of South Korea, responsible for the collection and administration of customs duties, control of imported and exported goods, and anti-smuggling operations.

Administratively, it is led by a Commissioner and their deputy, under the supervision of the Ministry of Economy and Finance, and headquartered at the Government Complex in Daejeon

It was founded as an independent organization on August 3, 1970, hitherto having been a subordinate part of the Ministry of Finance since July 17, 1948.

== See also ==
- Port security
- National Tax Service (South Korea)
