= Agricultural Cooperative College =

University in Gyeonggi province, South Korea

Coordinates: 37.658751°N 126.873035°E

Agricultural Cooperative University
- Type: Private
- Established: 1962
- Students: 250
- Location: Goyang, Gyeonggi, South Korea

- Agricultural Cooperative College
- Hangul: 농협대학교
- Hanja: 農協大學校
- RR: Nonghyeop daehakgyo
- MR: Nonghyŏp taehakkyo

Agricultural Cooperative University is a private university located in Goyang City, Gyeonggi province, South Korea. It is operated by the National Agricultural Cooperative Federation, also known as Nonghyup (농협).

== History ==
The school was first founded under the aegis of Konkuk University in 1962. Nonghyup took over the operation in 1966.

== Students ==
The student body is roughly 300. The school's alumni today number more than 3,400, most of whom are employed by the National Agricultural Cooperative Federation.

== Notable people ==
- Choi Sang-mok, College's president (2020-2022) and Acting President of South Korea.

== See also ==
- Education in South Korea
- List of colleges and universities in South Korea
