= Lee Joon-sik =

Korean politician and professor

Lee Joon-sik is a Korean politician and former professor of mechanical engineering at Seoul National University. He served as Minister of Education and Deputy Prime Minister of South Korea. He was appointed Deputy Prime Minister of South Korea by former president Park Geun-hye.
