= Choo Kyung-ho =

Acting Prime Minister of South Korea in 2022

Choo Kyung-ho MP
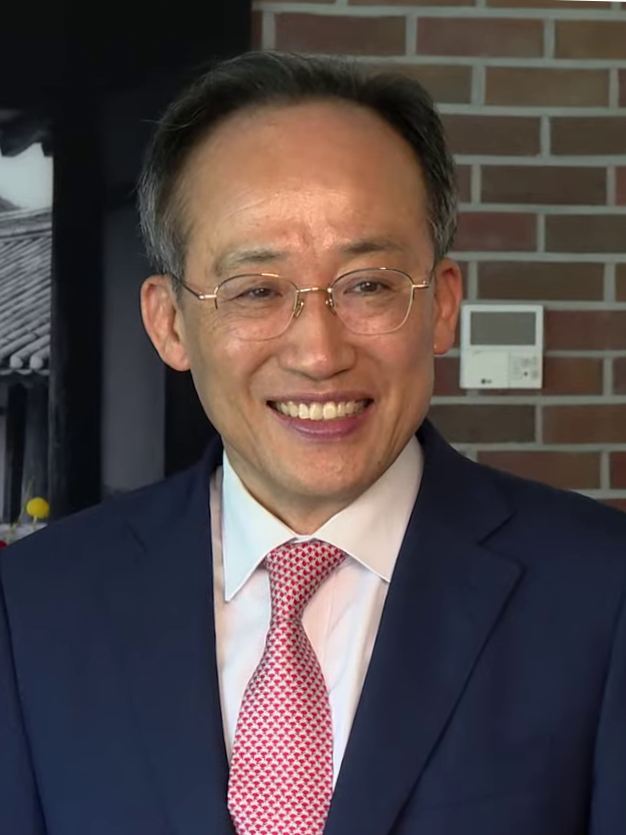
- Choo in 2024

Mayor of Daegu
- Incumbent
- Assumed office 1 July 2026
- Preceded by: Hong Joon-pyo; Kim Jeong-gi (acting)

Floor Leader of the People Power Party
- In office 9 May 2024 – 7 December 2024
- Preceded by: Yoon Jae-ok; Bae June-young (acting)
- Succeeded by: Bae June-young (acting); Kweon Seong-dong

Acting Prime Minister of South Korea
- In office 12 May 2022 – 20 May 2022
- President: Yoon Suk Yeol
- Deputy: Himself
- Preceded by: Kim Boo-kyum
- Succeeded by: Han Duck-soo

Deputy Prime Minister and Minister of Economy and Finance
- In office 10 May 2022 – 29 December 2023
- Prime Minister: Himself (acting); Han Duck-soo
- Preceded by: Hong Nam-ki
- Succeeded by: Choi Sang-mok

Minister for Government Policy Coordination
- In office 25 July 2014 – 12 January 2016
- President: Park Geun-hye
- Prime Minister: Chung Hong-won; Lee Wan-koo; Hwang Kyo-ahn
- Preceded by: Kim Dong-yeon
- Succeeded by: Lee Seok-joon

Member of the National Assembly for Dalseong (Daegu)
- In office 30 May 2016 – 29 April 2026
- Preceded by: Lee Jong-jin
- Succeeded by: Lee Jin-sook

Personal details
- Born: 29 July 1960 (age 66) Dalseong, North Gyeongsang, South Korea
- Party: Saenuri Party (2016–2017); Liberty Korea Party (2017–2020); People Power Party (2020–present)
- Spouse: Kim Hee-kyung
- Children: 2
- Education: Korea University (BBA); University of Oregon (MA)

Korean name
- Hangul: 추경호
- RR: Chu Gyeongho
- MR: Ch'u Kyŏngho

Choo Kyung-ho (Korean: 추경호, born 29 July 1960) is a South Korean politician who has served as the Mayor of Daegu since 2026. A member of the People Power Party, he served as the deputy prime minister and minister of economy and finance from 2022 to 2023 under President Yoon Suk Yeol. Choo has also been the member of the National Assembly for Dalseong since 2016.

Before entering to the National Assembly, he served as the 1st Deputy Minister of Economy and Finance, as well as the Minister for Government Policy Coordination under the President Park Geun-hye, and the Vice Chairman of the Financial Services Commission under the Lee Myung-bak government. During his tenure in the Yoon administraion, Choo was briefly the acting prime minister of South Korea from 12 May to 20 May 2022.

== Personal life and education ==
Choo was born in Dalseong, North Gyeongsang (now under Daegu) and attended Keisung High School. He was educated at Korea University, where he completed Bachelor in Business Administration. He also obtained master's degree in economics at the University of Oregon.

He is married to Kim Hee-kyung and has 2 daughters.

== Early career ==
From 1987, he had been working at the Economic Planning Board and the Ministry of Finance and Economy; both are the predecessors of the Ministry of Economy and Finance. During this time, he drew the basis of South Korean macroeconomics. He was sent to the World Bank in 1999 and also worked as a councillor at the Organisation for Economic Co-operation and Development (OECD) from 2006 to 2009. He also served as the Vice Chairman of the Financial Services Commission.

== Political career ==
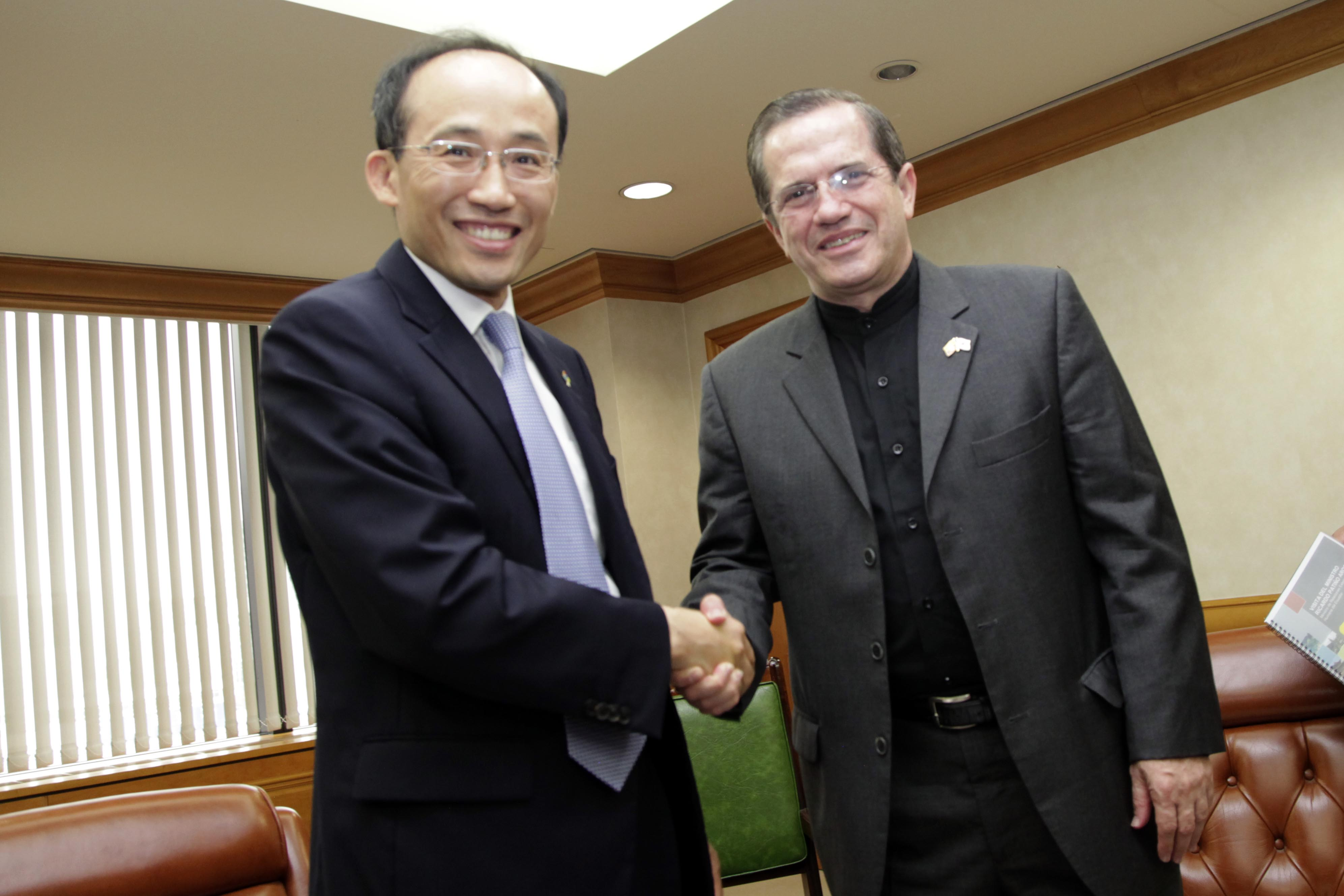
Choo with the Ecuadorian Minister of Foreign Affairs Ricardo Patiño (right) in 2013.

Following the 2012 presidential election, the President Park Geun-hye appointed him as the 1st Deputy Minister of Economy and Finance in March 2013. He was promoted to the Minister for Government Policy Coordination in July 2014.

Prior to the 2016 election, Choo joined the Saenuri Party, along with Chong Jong-sup, who was also the Cabinet member under the President Park. He contested for Dalseong and was elected. He became the Director of The Yeouido Institute in March 2017, shortly after the impeachment of Park Geun-hye. He was re-elected in 2020.

Following the 2022 presidential election, President-elect Yoon Suk-yeol nominated him as the Deputy Prime Minister and the Minister of Economy and Finance.

He became Floor Leader in May 2024. He resigned from the position in December amidst the first impeachment vote against Yoon, stating that he would take responsibility for "the third presidential impeachment vote in [South Korea's] constitutional history".

In the 2026 South Korean local elections, Choo was elected as the Mayor of Daegu, defeating Democratic Party nominee Kim Boo-kyum. Though most pre-election polls had shown the race within a razor-thin margin, Choo ultimately secured 53.92 percent of the vote against Kim's 45.05 percent. In his victory speech, Choo stated, "I will respect not only those who supported me but also those who chose another candidate, as I seek to bring everyone together and devote all my efforts to the development of Daegu."

== Other activities ==
- International Monetary Fund (IMF), Ex-Officio Member of the Board of Governors (since 2022)

== Election results ==
=== General elections ===
| Year | Elections | Constituency | Political party | Votes (%) | Remarks |
|---|---|---|---|---|---|
| 2016 | 20th National Assembly General Election | Dalseong (Daegu) | Saenuri | 40,355 (48.07%) | Won |
| 2020 | 21st National Assembly General Election | Dalseong (Daegu) | UFP | 88,846 (67.33%) | Won |
| 2024 | 22nd National Assembly General Election | Dalseong (Daegu) | PPP | 100,544 (75.31%) | Won |

=== Local elections ===
==== Mayor of Daegu ====
| Year | Elections | Constituency | Political party | Votes (%) | Remarks |
|---|---|---|---|---|---|
| 2026 | 9th Iocal Election | Daegu (Mayoral Elections) | PPP | 702,421 (53.92%) | Won |
