= Lee Yung-dug =

South Korean politician (1926–2010)

His Excellency Lee Yeong-duk
- 이영덕

27th Prime Minister of South Korea
- In office 30 April 1994 – 16 December 1994
- President: Kim Young-sam
- Deputy: Lee Hong-koo
- Preceded by: Lee Hoi-chang
- Succeeded by: Lee Hong-koo

25th Deputy Prime Minister of South Korea and Minister of Unification
- In office 22 December 1993 – 30 April 1994
- President: Kim Young-sam
- Prime Minister: Lee Hoi-chang
- Preceded by: Chung Jae-seok
- Succeeded by: Lee Hong-koo

Personal details
- Born: 6 March 1926
- Died: 6 February 2010 (aged 83)
- Education: Seoul National University (BA); Ohio State University (PhD)

Korean name
- Hangul: 이영덕
- Hanja: 李榮德
- RR: I Yeongdeok
- MR: I Yŏngdŏk

Lee Yeong-duk (6 March 1926 – 6 February 2010) was a South Korean politician who served as the prime minister of South Korea from April to December 1994.

Lee died on 6 February 2010, at the age of 83.
