= Ministry of Data and Statistics =

South Korea's principal government institution in charge of statistics and census data

- 국가데이터처

Agency overview
- Formed: 1990; 36 years ago
- Preceding agency: Statistics Korea
- Headquarters: Daejeon, South Korea
- Agency executive: Lee Hyoung-il, Commissioner
- Parent agency: Ministry of Economy and Finance
- Website: kostat.go.kr

Korean name
- Hangul: 국가데이터처
- Hanja: 國家데이터處
- RR: Gukga deiteocheo
- MR: Kukka teit'ŏch'ŏ

Former name
- Hangul: 통계청
- Hanja: 統計廳
- RR: Tonggyecheong
- MR: T'onggyech'ŏng

Ministry of Data and Statistics (KOSTAT; Korean: 국가데이터처) is a government organization responsible for managing national statistics in South Korea. KOSTAT is headquartered in Daejeon, South Korea and operates under the Ministry of Economy and Finance.

The Ministry of Data and Statistics generates population and household census yearly (every 5 years until 2015). It also gathers analytic and administrative statistics.

Originally named Statistics Korea, the Lee Jae-myung government elevated the organization to the ministerial level on October 1, 2025, renaming it to the Ministry of Data and Statistics.

== Logos ==
Logo used between 1990-2025

Current logo

== See also ==
- List of national and international statistical services
- Official statistics
