= Yoo Il-ho =

South Korean politician

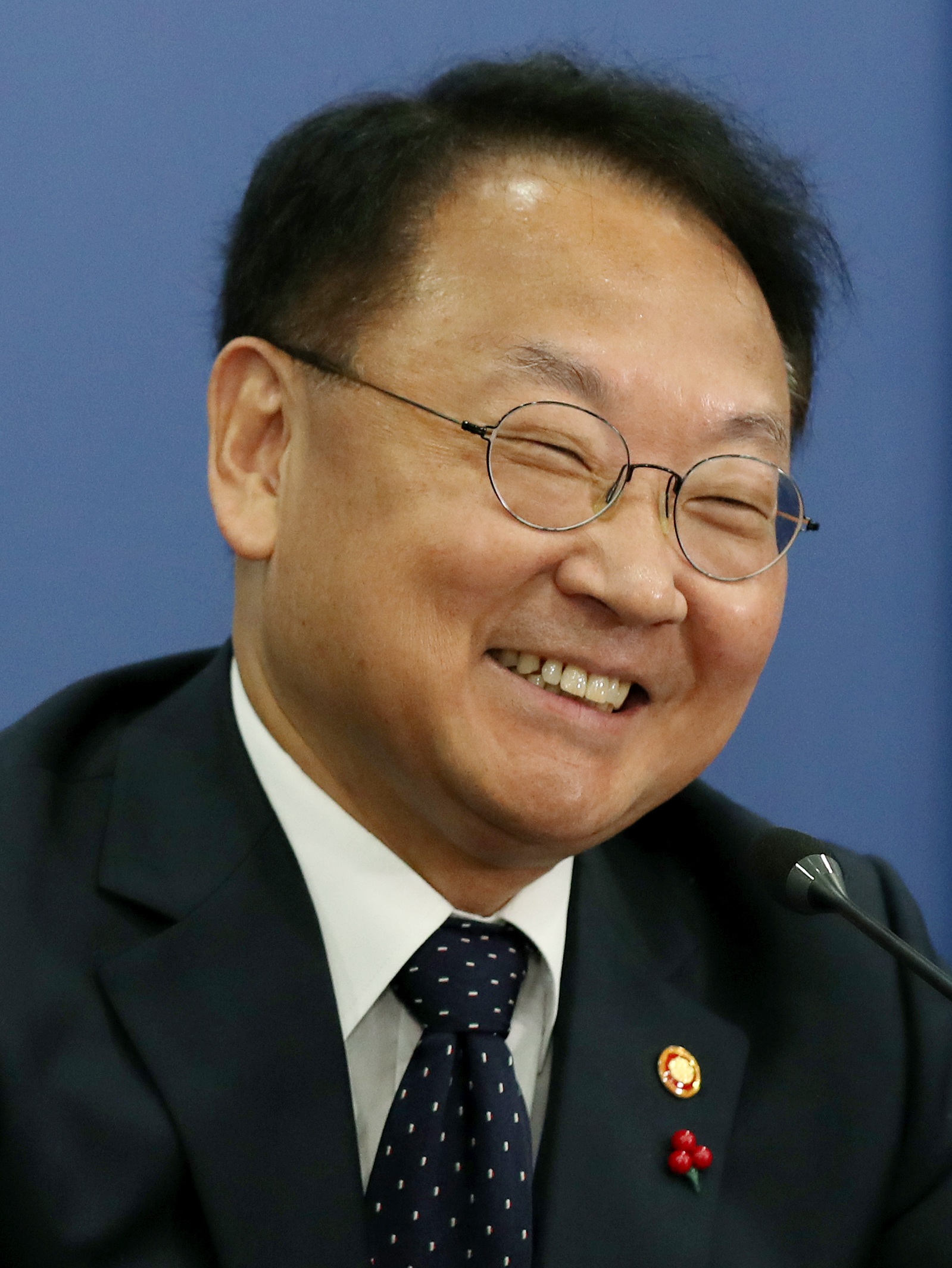
- Yoo in 2016

Acting Prime Minister of South Korea
- In office 11 May 2017 – 31 May 2017
- President: Moon Jae-in
- Preceded by: Hwang Kyo-ahn
- Succeeded by: Lee Nak-yon

Deputy Prime Minister and Minister of Economy and Finance
- In office 13 January 2016 – 9 June 2017
- Prime Minister: Hwang Kyo-ahn; Himself (acting); Lee Nak-yon
- Preceded by: Choi Kyoung-hwan
- Succeeded by: Kim Dong-yeon

Personal details
- Born: 30 March 1955 (age 71)
- Party: People Power
- Education: Seoul National University; University of Pennsylvania

- Yoo Il-ho
- Hangul: 유일호
- Hanja: 柳一鎬
- RR: Yu Ilho
- MR: Yu Irho

Yoo Il-ho (Korean: 유일호; Hanja: 柳一鎬; born 30 March 1955) is a South Korean politician who served as the acting prime minister of South Korea from 11 May 2017 until 31 May 2017. Yoo had also served as the deputy prime minister and minister of economy and finance.

== Election results ==
Year	Elections	Constituency	Political party	Votes (%)	Results
2008	18th National Assembly General Election	Songpa B (Seoul)	GNP	39,089 (61.98%)	Won
2012	19th National Assembly General Election	Songpa B (Seoul)	Saenuri	49,929 (49.94%)	Won

Political offices
Preceded by Choi Kyoung-hwan	Minister of Economy and Finance; 2016–2017	Succeeded by Kim Dong-yeon
