= Lee Hun-jai =

South Korean politician

Acting Prime Minister of South Korea
- In office 19 May 2000 – 22 May 2000
- President: Kim Dae-jung
- Preceded by: Park Tae-joon
- Succeeded by: Lee Han-dong
- In office 25 July 2004 – 30 July 2004
- President: Roh Moo-hyun
- Preceded by: Goh Kun
- Succeeded by: Lee Hae-chan

Personal details
- Born: 17 April 1944 (age 82) Shanghai, China
- Education: Seoul National University (LLB); Boston University (MA); Harvard University (MBA)

Korean name
- Hangul: 이헌재
- Hanja: 李憲宰
- RR: I Heonjae
- MR: I Hŏnjae

Lee Hun-jai (Korean: 이헌재; born 17 April 1944) is a South Korean politician who served as the acting prime minister of South Korea twice, from 19 May 2000, to 22 May 2000, and from 25 July 2004, to 30 July 2004. Both times others were nominated to officially take that position and were confirmed by Parliament, while Lee was meant only as a temporary placeholder. Lee does not belong to any political party.

== Education ==
Lee was born in Shanghai, China on 17 April 1944. He graduated from Kyunggi High School in 1962, and Seoul National University with a bachelor's degree in Law in 1966. Lee also earned his master's degree in Economics from the College of Economics at Boston University in 1981 and MBA from Harvard Business School in 1982.

== Career ==
After passing the 6th Examination for Higher Civil Service in 1968, Lee joined the Planning and Management of the Finance Ministry in 1969. He soon distinguished himself, helping to avert a currency crisis in 1973 which resulted from an oil shortage. He left the finance ministry in 1981 and rejoined the government later. He served as chairman of the South Korean Securities and Exchange Commission from 1991 to 1996 and as chairman of the Financial Supervisory Commission from 1998 to 2000. While in these positions he was known as a ruthless business and banking reformer. In January 2000 he became finance minister for the first time and served in that position until August 2000. In February 2004 he became deputy prime minister and also became finance minister again. On 7 March 2005, he announced his resignation from these positions after he was implicated in a real estate scandal. He left office a week later after his replacement was chosen.
