= Ministry of Science, ICT and Future Planning =

2013–2017 South Korean government agency

Ministry of Science, ICT & Future Planning
- 미래창조과학부

Agency overview
- Preceding agencies: Ministry of Education, Science and Technology (Science and Technology); Ministry of Knowledge Economy (ICT, Postal and Future Planning)
- Dissolved: July 26, 2017
- Superseding agency: Ministry of Science and ICT
- Jurisdiction: Government of South Korea
- Minister responsible: Choi Yanghee, Minister of Science, ICT and Future Planning
- Deputy Ministers responsible: Lee Sukjoon, 1st Vice Minister of Science and Future Planning; Choi Jaeyou, 2nd Vice Minister of ICT; Choi Jongbae, Deputy Minister for Creative Economy Coordination
- Website: web.archive.org/web/20210304070230/http://english.msip.go.kr/english/main/main.do

Korean name
- Hangul: 미래창조과학부
- Hanja: 未來創造科學部
- RR: Mirae changjo gwahakbu
- MR: Mirae ch'angjo kwahakpu

The Ministry of Science, ICT and Future Planning (MSIP; Korean: 미래창조과학부) was a ministry of the Government of South Korea. Its purpose is to set, manage, and evaluate science and technology policy, support scientific research and development, develop human resources, conduct R&D leading to the production and consumption of Atomic power, plan national informatization and information protection strategies, manage radio frequency bands, oversee the information and communications technology (ICT) industry, and operate Korea Post. Its headquarters we in Building #4 of the Gwacheon Government Complex in Gwacheon, Gyeonggi Province.

Ministry of Science and ICT succeeds the ministry from 2017.

== History ==
The creation of the ministry was announced in February 2013. The ministry was created under a reorganization plan initiated by South Korean President Park Geun-hye in an effort to generate new sources of economic growth in the areas of science and information technology.

The creation of the ministry was one of Park's core pledges during the 2013 campaign leading to her election.

The ministry dissolved in July 2017. Ministry of Science and ICT (과학기술정보통신부) succeeds the former ministry.

== Leadership ==
Choi Mun-kee was the inaugural Minister of this Ministry. Later Choi Yanghee became the Minister of Science, ICT and Future Planning. He was nominated by President Park Geun-hye.

== Mandate & activities ==
Policies on new media, such as cable TV service operators, satellite channels and digital multimedia broadcasting, have been transferred to this ministry. The ministry is expected to contribute to the creation of about 410,000 jobs in these areas by the year 2017, including about 90,000 jobs in business start-ups.

The ministry will help drive the so-called national informatization project, which seeks to introduce technology into a variety of areas including traditional markets, agriculture, and small- and medium-sized businesses.

=== Awards ===
The ministry is responsible for awarding the Korea Science and Technology Award in conjunction with the Korean Federation of Science and Technology Societies and the Korea Mobile App Award in conjunction with the MoneyToday publication.

== Controversy ==
=== Naming ===
Because the ministry not only took over from the former Ministry of Science and Technology, but also assumed responsibility for ICT from the Ministry of Information and Communication and control of Korea Post, some people worry that it has become bloated. Some others worry about its Korean name, as the Korean name translates directly to English as "Ministry of Future Creation and Science". Some scientists worry that it hints at Creationism.

=== Christianity bias ===
In May 2013, a mission was created within the ministry, stating their purpose as "Becoming lead gospel on ministry, and change country for god". According to their business plan, they planned to evangelize one person every month, identifying Islam as a cult organization. People worry about the religious neutrality of public servants. A person in charge said "the business plan is just a document made by a member of the mission, and is not an official policy".

== See also ==
- Science and technology in South Korea
- Internet in South Korea
- KAIST
- National Science Museum
