= Ministry of Science and ICT =

Government ministry of South Korea

- 과학기술정보통신부

Agency overview
- Formed: 26 July 2017; 9 years ago
- Preceding agencies: Ministry of Science and Technology (1967–2008); Ministry of Education, Science and Technology (2008–2013); Ministry of Science, ICT and Future Planning (2013–2017)
- Jurisdiction: Government of South Korea
- Headquarters: Sejong, South Korea
- Employees: 2,007 (excluding Korea Post)
- Annual budget: ₩18.9 trillion (US$13.2 billion) (FY2025)
- Minister responsible: Bae Kyung-hoon, Minister
- Deputy Ministers responsible: Koo Hyuk Chae, 1st Vice Minister; Ryu Jemyung, 2nd Vice Minister; Park In Kyu, Vice Minister for Science, Technology and Innovation
- Child agency: Korea AeroSpace Administration
- Website: www.msit.go.kr/eng/

Korean name
- Hangul: 과학기술정보통신부
- Hanja: 科學技術情報通信部
- RR: Gwahak gisul jeongbo tongsinbu
- MR: Kwahak kisul chŏngbo t'ongsinbu

The Ministry of Science and ICT (MSIT; Korean: 과학기술정보통신부) is a ministry of the government of South Korea. It succeeded the former Ministry of Science, ICT and Future Planning. "ICT" stands for "Information and Communication Technology".

The headquarters was originally in Gwacheon, Gyeonggi-do before relocating to Sejong City in 2019 with new buildings constructed in 2021.

== Organization ==
The organization consists of the Minister, the First and Second Vice Ministers, the Headquarters Director, three offices (실), 19 bureaus (국) and offices (관), and 70 divisions (과) and teams. There is a policy advisor under the Minister, and it is divided into the First and Second Vice Ministers and the Science and Technology Innovation Headquarters.

=== Affiliated organizations ===
- Korea AeroSpace Administration
- Korea Post
- National Science Museum
- Gwacheon National Science Museum
- National Radio Research Agency
- Central Radio Management Service

== See also ==
- Science and technology in South Korea
- Internet in South Korea
- KAIST
- National Science Museum
