= Ministry of Finance and Economy (South Korea) =

Government ministry of South Korea

Ministry of Economy and Finance Republic of Korea
- 재정경제부

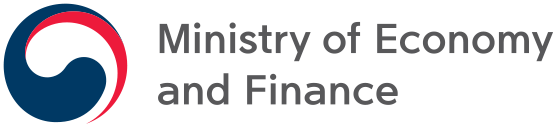

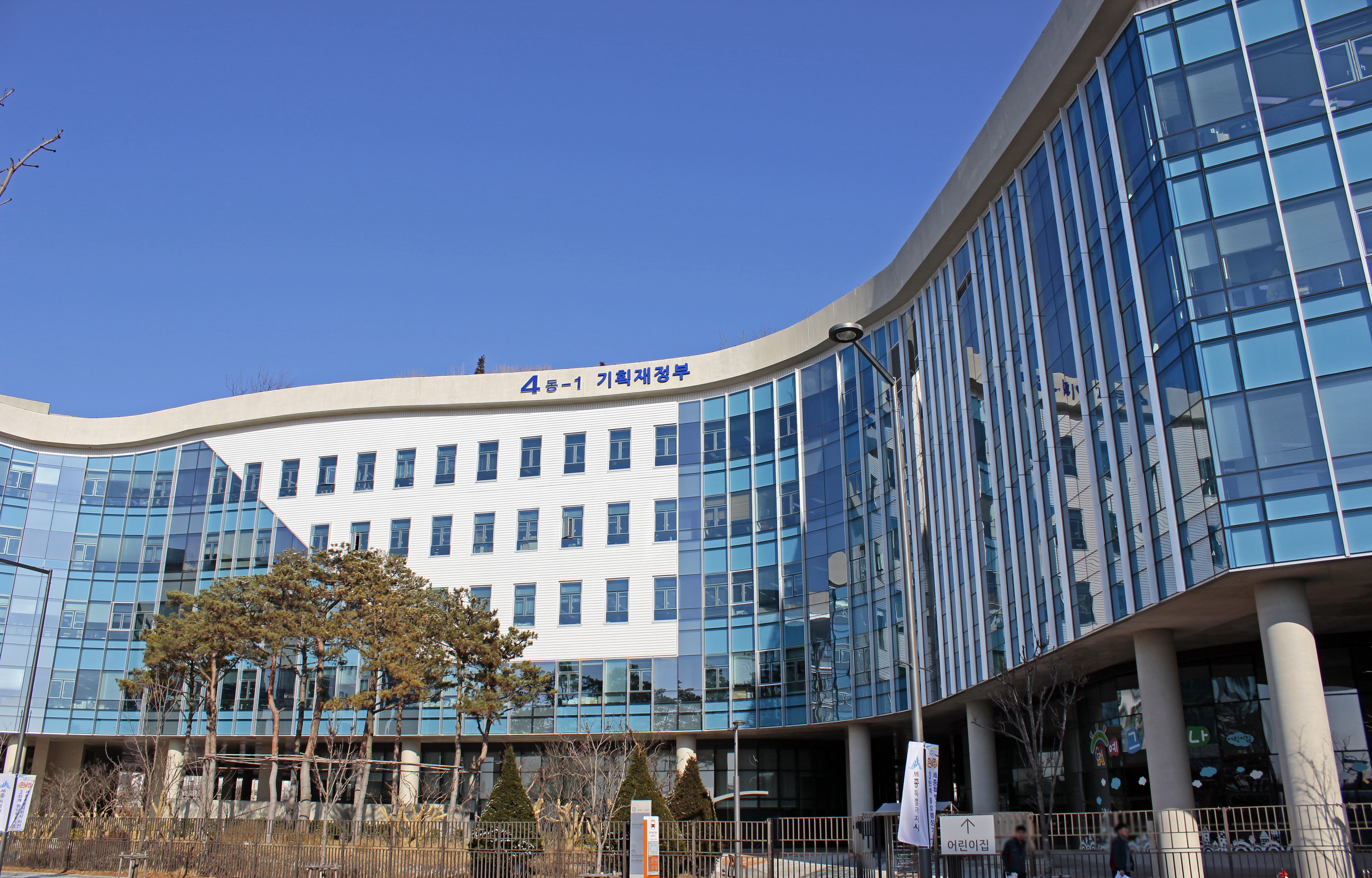
- MOEF headquarters in Sejong

Agency overview
- Formed: February 29, 2008
- Preceding agencies: Ministry of Finance (1948–1994); Ministry of Finance and Economy (1994–2008); Ministry of Planning and Budget (1999–2008); Ministry of Strategy and Finance (2008–2018)
- Jurisdiction: Government of South Korea
- Headquarters: Government Complex-Sejong, 477, Galmae-ro, Sejong-si 30109, South Korea
- Minister responsible: Koo Yun-cheol, Minister
- Deputy Ministers responsible: Lee Hyoung-il, 1st Vice Minister (in charge to Fiscality and Politic); Lim Ki-keun, 2nd Vice Minister (in charge to budget and finance)
- Child agencies: National Tax Service; Korea Customs Service; Statistics Korea; Public Procurement Service
- Website: english.mofe.go.kr

Korean name
- Hangul: 재정경제부
- Hanja: 財政經濟部
- RR: Jaejeong gyeongjebu
- MR: Chaejŏng kyŏngjebu

The Ministry of Finance and Economy (MOFE; Korean: 재정경제부) oversees the financial policies of the Government of the Republic of Korea. It publishes a monthly report on the national economy, known as the "Green Book." The current minister is Koo Yun-cheol. The headquarters is in the Sejong Government Complex in Sejong City.

According to Chapter 3 Article 19 of the Government Organisation Act, the Minister of Finance and Economy also acts as the Deputy Prime Minister, together with the Minister for Education.

MOEF has enforcement functions as well. It oversees the National Tax Tribunal and the Financial Intelligence Unit.

The ministry was formed in 1994 through the merger of the old Economic Planning Board (est. 1961) and Ministry of Finance (est. 1948).

== History ==
1948

Three years after gaining independence from Japan, the Korean government was set up and it established the Ministry of Finance and the Economic Planning Board. The Ministry of Finance took charge of designing tax, financial and monetary policies as well as managing state-owned property and exchange rates. On the other hand, the Economic Planning Board was empowered in 1961 and assumed an important mandate of designing 5 year economic development plans in addition to its usual functions such as managing the government's budget and securing foreign loans.

1967

The Economic Planning Board introduces the Republic of Korea's first electronic mainframe computer, an IBM 1401 system, to process data collected from the country's national census conducted the previous year.

1994

As the need arose for an integrated approach to implement the government's functions on economic affairs in an efficient and coherent way, the Economic Planning Board and the Ministry of Finance was merged into the Ministry of Finance and Economy (MOFE).

1998

In a response to the 1997 Asian financial crisis, the MOFE's functions were separated and transferred to other Ministries so as to mitigate the overconcentration of decision-making authority by MOFE. Its budgetary authority was transferred to the National Budget Administration, its financial supervision authority to the Financial Supervisory Commission, and its trade negotiating authority to the Ministry of Foreign Affairs and Trade.

1999

The Planning and Budget Commission and the National Budget Administration was merged into the Ministry of Planning and Budget (MPB).

2008

The Ministry of Finance and Economy (MOFE) and the Ministry of Planning and Budget (MPB) were again merged into the Ministry of Strategy and Finance (MOSF) in order to put under one roof fiscal policy functions and inter-ministerial policy coordination. On the other hand, the MOFE's authority on financial policies regarding the financial market was transferred to the Financial Services Commission. In 2018, the ministry changed its official English name to the Ministry of Economy and Finance.

=== 2026 ===
Ministry of Strategy and Finance (MOSF) was divided into two organs, Ministry of Finance and Economy (MOFE) and the Ministry of Planning and Budget (MPB).

== Offices ==
Currently this Ministry is in Sejong Government Complex in Sejong City. Previously the office had its headquarters in the Government Complex Gwacheon, in Gwacheon, Gyeonggi Province.

== Tasks ==
1. Planning and coordination of the mid- to long-term socio-economic development goals and setting economic policy direction on an annual basis

2. Distributing resources effectively and assessing the effectiveness of budget execution

3. Planning/reforming Korea's tax policy and system

4. Planning and management of policies for treasury, government properties, government accounting and the national debt

5. Coordination of policies for foreign currency transactions and international finance

6. Enhancement of international cooperation and promotion of inter-Korean economic exchanges and cooperation

7. Management and monitoring of public institutions' operation

== Criticism ==
The Ministry of Economy and Finance was accused of releasing a comprehensive review on welfare-related campaign promises of each political party before the 2012 election.

== Logo ==
1948~2001

2001~2008

2008~2016

2016~2026

2026~present

== See also ==
- Government of South Korea
- Economy of South Korea
- Korea Financial Investment Association
- Financial Services Commission
- Financial Supervisory Service
- Bank of Korea
- Statistics Korea
