= Lee Kwang-jae (politician) =

South Korean politician (born 1965)

- 이광재
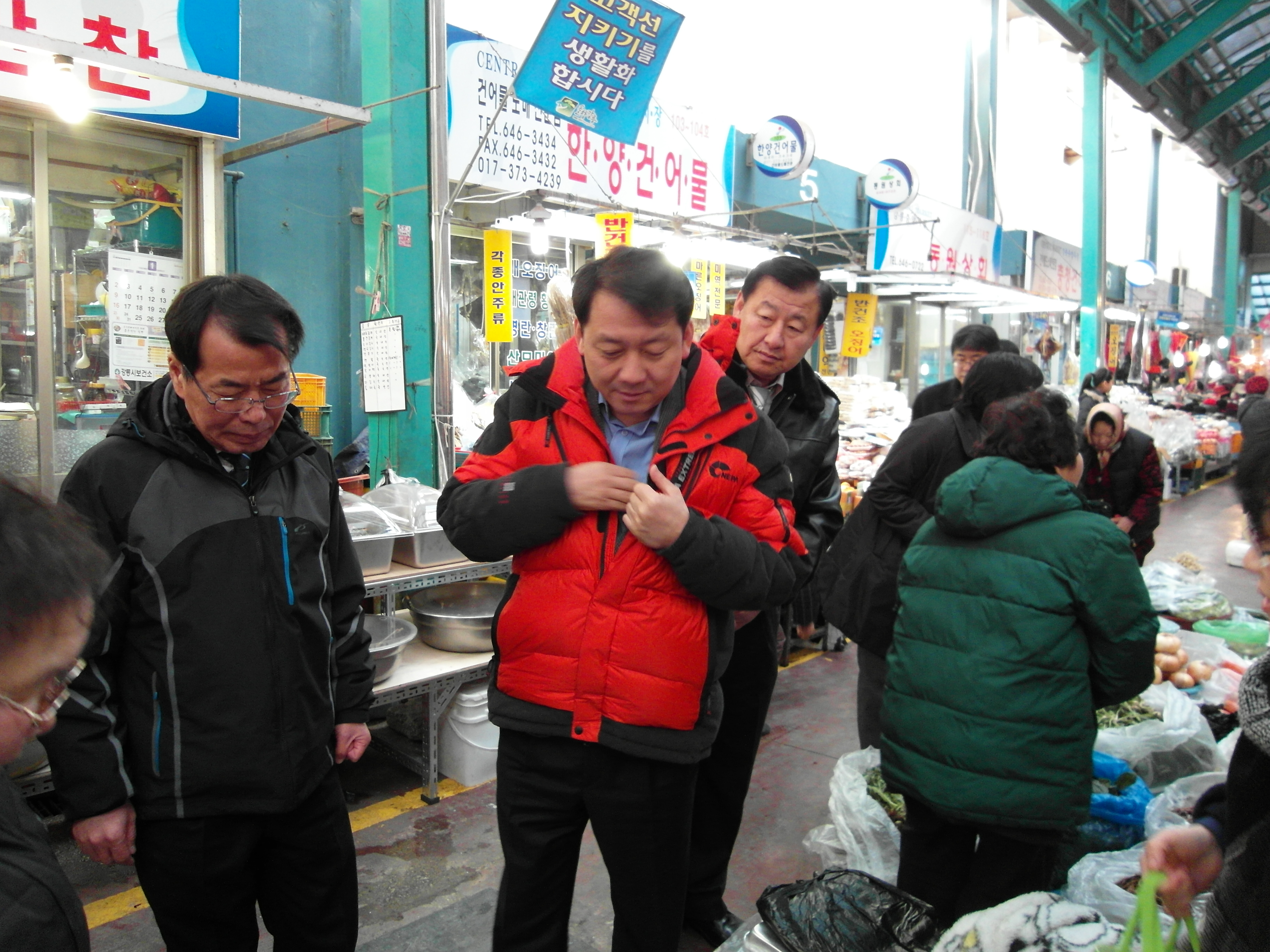
- Lee in 2011

Governor of Gangwon
- In office 1 July 2010 – 27 January 2011; Suspended: 1 July 2010 – 2 September 2010
- Preceded by: Kim Jin-sun
- Succeeded by: Kang Ki-chang (acting); Choi Moon-soon

Member of the National Assembly
- Incumbent
- Assumed office 4 June 2026
- Preceded by: Choo Mi-ae
- Constituency: Hanam A (Gyeonggi)
- In office 30 May 2020 – 29 April 2022
- Preceded by: Kim Ki-sun
- Succeeded by: Park Jung-ha
- Constituency: Wonju A (Gangwon)
- In office 30 May 2004 – 28 April 2010
- Preceded by: Kim Yong-hak
- Succeeded by: Choi Jong-won
- Constituency: Taebaek–Yeongwol–Pyeongchang–Jeongseon (Gangwon)

Personal details
- Born: 28 February 1965 (age 61) Cheonbyeon-ri, Pyeongchang-eup, Pyeongchang, Gangwon, South Korea
- Party: Democratic
- Spouse: Lee Jung-sook
- Children: 2
- Parent(s): Lee Kang-won (father); Yeon Myung-soon (mother)
- Relatives: Lee Kang-choon (aunt)
- Education: Yonsei University
- Occupation: Activist, labourer, politician

Lee Kwang-jae (Korean: 이광재, born 28 February 1965) is a South Korean activist, labourer and politician. He was the former Governor of Gangwon from 2010 to 2011. He has been the Member of the National Assembly for Gyeonggi Hanam A constituency since 2026, previously MP for Gangwon Wonju A constituency from 2020 to 2022 Gangwon Taebaek–Yeongwol–Pyeongchang–Jeongseon from 2004 to 2010.

Born in Pyeongchang, Lee studied chemical engineering and law at Yonsei University. He worked as a secretary to Roh Moo-hyun before being elected to the National Assembly at the 2004 election. He contested for Gangwon governorship at the 2010 elections and defeated Yi Kye-jin, making him as the first non-conservative governor. His term was, however, only up to 7 months after he was found guilty of corruption allegations.

Despite being barred from running for any elections for 10 years, Lee was pardoned by the President Moon Jae-in on 30 December 2019, and thus paved a way for him to make a comeback. He then contested for Wonju A constituency at the 2020 election, where he successfully defeated the former Deputy Governor of Jeju Park Jung-ha. He had been widely considered as a potential candidate for the 2022 presidential election.

== Early life ==
Lee Kwang-jae was born in Cheonbyeon-ri, Pyeongchang-eup, Pyeongchang, Gangwon in 1965, as the eldest (and the only one) son and the 2nd child in a family of 7 children. His father, Lee Kang-won, was a civil servant, whereas his mother, Yeon Myung-soon, was a miller. His aunt, Lee Kang-choon, was split with his father during the Korean War, and currently resides in Pyongyang area, North Korea.

He attended 2 primary schools — Pyeongchang Primary School and Yemi Primary School, and 3 secondary schools — Hamback Secondary School, Pyeongchang Secondary School and Wonju Secondary School. Initially, he entered Hamback Secondary School, but then transferred to Pyeongchang Secondary School, and then to Wonju Secondary School as advised by his father "to go to urban areas". During that time, Wonju was the centre of anti-dictatorship activities; he befriended a son of Jang Hwa-soon, the younger brother of Jang Il-soon. He was politically inspired by Jang Il-soon.

Lee attended Wonju High School in 1980, but shortly after, a massive protest came in Gwangju after the coup d'état of Chun Doo-hwan. Although he was willing to go to Gwangju, he was not dare as he was the eldest and the only one son in his family. Instead, he took a trip with his friends before applying to Yonsei University in 1983, where he studied chemical engineering and obtained a bachelor's degree in law. He chose science stream to get rid of any kind of political activities, although he subsequently became the editor of A Million Student, an anti-government student magazine of the university, in 1985. Regarding this time, he later described that he was angry at plain clothes police officers who acted violently at a library.

As he was wanted by the magazine activities, Lee moved to Cheonan and worked as a labourer in 1986. He soon went down to Busan, where he worked at a foundry. He was arrested for breaching the National Security Act on 18 November 1987. On 11 March 1988, he was sentenced to 2 years in prison and 3 years probation, but was pardoned on 21 December.

== Political career ==
Lee met Roh Moo-hyun, who was later elected the President, in Busan in 1987. When Roh was elected to the National Assembly in 1988, Lee became his secretary; he was the youngest secretary to an MP during that time. Along with Ahn Hee-jung, both were called "Left HJ & Right KJ (좌희정 우광재)".

He worked closer to Cho Soon during the 1995 local elections; Cho was elected the Mayor of Seoul. After Roh was elected the President in 2002, Lee was appointed the Chief of the Office of the State of Affairs, but resigned after eight months following the criticisms for being "too influential". He contested for Taebaek-Yeongwol-Pyeongchang-Jeongseon at the 2004 election and was elected. Then, he was appointed one of the deputy parliamentary leaders of the Uri Party. He also organised the Parliamentary Politics Research Centre, along with 11 other MPs.

Under the Roh government, Lee was a person putting efforts to hold the Winter Olympic Games in Pyeongchang, where he was born. As a part of his efforts, the Korean Sport & Olympic Committee (KOC) confirmed Pyeongchang as the South Korean candidate city for the 2014 Winter Olympics. Despite his contributions, Pyeongchang lost to Sochi, Russia, with a margin of 4 votes. His birthplace could held the games in 2018.

The Grand National Party (GNP) presidential candidate Lee Myung-bak was elected the new president in 2007 amid the low popularity of the Roh government. Lee Kwang-jae, however, was re-elected to his constituency at the 2008 election. Nevertheless, on 26 March 2009, he was detained over the allegations of receiving 160,000,000 won (£100,940) from Park Yeon-cha and Jung Dae-geun. He announced his resignation as an MP, as well as retirement from politics. The Democratic Party dissuaded him to retract the decision.

=== Governor of Gangwon (2010–2011) ===
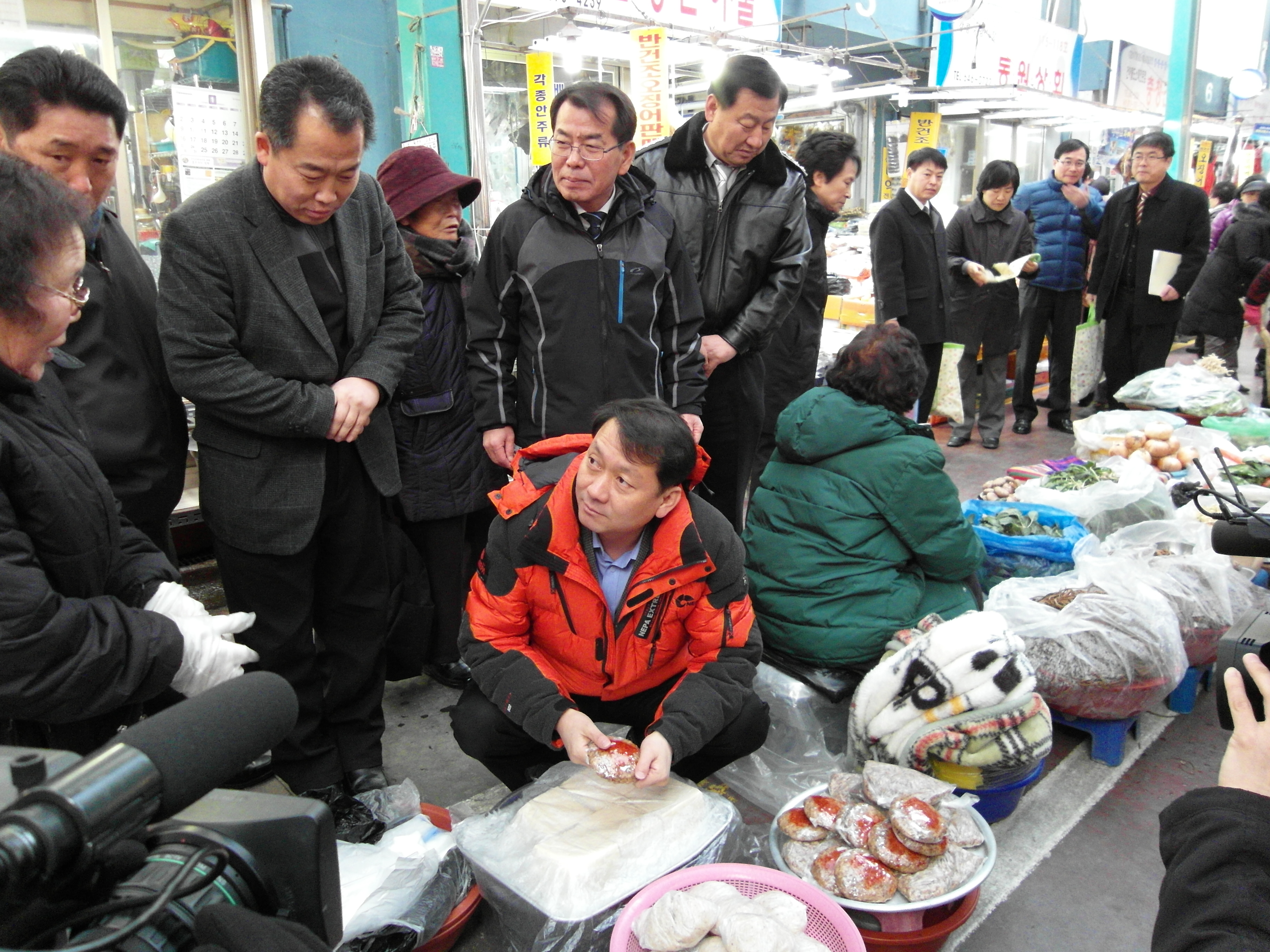
Lee Kwang-jae visiting Gangneung Central Market on 24 January 2011

On 22 April 2010, Lee announced his intention to run for the Gangwon governorship at the 2010 local elections. 2 days later, he was confirmed as the Democratic candidate for the position. On 26 May, Lee became the opposition unity candidate of the Democratic Party and the Democratic Labour Party (DLP) to fight against the then ruling GNP candidate Yi Kye-jin.

Initially, various polls showed that Lee came far behind to Yi. However, the final result ended up with an upset victory, where Lee obtained 54.36% and defeated Yi. Lee also became the first non-conservative governor of the conservative stronghold province. The GNP's analyses have suggested that senses of alienation among people, lack of "competent" candidates, and Lee's caring towards people, provoked the surprise outcome.

==== Court trial and removal ====
While he was running for and elected at the election, his corruption cases were on trial, where the 2nd trial was ongoing. At the first trial, he was sentenced 8 months in prison, 2 years probation, and 148,140,000 won (£94,113) in compensation, which was equivalent to void the election.

On 11 June 2010, few weeks before the inauguration, the Seoul High Court sentenced him to 6 months in prison, 1 year probation and 114,170,000 won (£72,532) in compensation, and therefore he took an oath while being suspended from conducting duties. He filed a constitutional appeal, and the Constitutional Court ordered him to return to the office on 2 September.

Nevertheless, on 27 January 2011, the Supreme Court confirmed the original verdict of the 2nd trial, and Lee was removed from his office. He was also barred from running for any elections for 10 years. Critics, including the Democratic Party, argued that he was victimised by the Lee Myung-bak government. The annulment of the election provoked the by-election in April, where Choi Moon-soon was elected.

=== Post-political life (2011–2019) ===
Following the removal, Lee headed to Beijing, China in July 2011. He was appointed a visiting professor of the School of Public Policy and Management at Tsinghua University and served until 2013. During this time, he interviewed various government officials and scholars in China; he wrote a book titled Asking China: Superpower DNA of the 21st Century in 2012 based on the experiences.

After returning to South Korea, Lee became the assistant director of Future Consensus Institute in 2016, and was promoted to the Director in 2017. Prior to the Independence Movement Day 2019, there was an attempt to pardon him, but never happened as politicians were excluded by the Ministry of Justice.

=== Comeback (2019-) ===
On 30 December 2019, Lee was given a special amnesty by the President Moon Jae-in, along with Kwak No-hyun and Han Sang-kyun. He subsequently became a co-chairman of the Election Committee of the Democratic Party prior to the 2020 election. On 2 March 2020, he announced he would stand for Wonju 1st constituency at the election. He contested against the United Future Party (UFP) candidate Park Jung-ha, the former Spokesperson of the Office of the President and the former Deputy Governor of Jeju.

Lee was successful in his bid to return to parliament, winning a four-year term in the National Assembly. He, therefore, made a political comeback after 9 years.

=== 2022 presidential election ===
On 11 May 2021, Lee said that he is currently preparing for the 2022 presidential election. He indicated that he was inspired by Sejong the Great, who conducted an opinion polling to collect data from about 170 thousands people in Gyeongsang Province and Jeolla Province areas to gradually introduce a tax policy. His bid was welcomed by another MPs from Gangwon i.e. Woo Sang-ho, Song Ki-hun, Heo Young, and so on.

On 27 May, Lee made an official announcement to run for the presidential election at KBIZ-Korea Federation of SMEs headquarter in Yeouido. He said that the country needs a political revolution with a change of era, generation and "players". His slogan is "Republic of Korea, the first country meeting the world's future".

== Controversies ==
=== Default of national service ===
In 1985, Lee was enlisted for national service, but was exempted in 1986 after he lost his right forefinger. During an interview with The Dong-A Ilbo in 2003, Lee explained that his forefinger was cut while using a press machine at a factory in Bupyeong. In the end of the year, he said at the National Assembly Proceeding Hall that the incident occurred during the university life.

The issue came to a controversy when he published his autobiography titled Dream of a Spring Water prior to the 2004 election, where he described that he purposely cut his finger to write in blood on a Taegukgi after he saw self-immolation of students in 1986. Oh Seung-jae, the Deputy Spokesperson of the GNP, suggested a possibility the incident was "on purpose to default national service", citing Lee's autobiography. As the issue became controversial, the GNP urged him to tell the truth. Kim Hyong-o, a GNP MP, compared Lee to An Jung-geun, saying, "No one doubt a patriotism for An's short finger. At least he left a finger to use a gun when the country is under crisis."

Lee explained, "It's meaningless to talk about my finger without considering the year of 1986, when I could be tortured if I was enlisted. If I mentioned the names of my comrades to avoid tortures, they would be victimised. I couldn't even accept it." He also clarified that the event was "on purpose" to write in blood on a Taegukgi to "not betray his colleagues". His wife, Lee Jung-sook, urged people to stop talking about the matter.

=== Regional remarks ===
On 31 March 2021, prior to the 2021 by-elections, Lee provoked a controversy for his remarks. He said, "Daegu has the weakest economy in Korea despite about 40 years under the President Park Chung Hee, Chun Doo-hwan, Roh Tae-woo, Lee Myung-bak and Park Geun-hye. Why? It's because they always vote based on their political parties, not the actual people." He also added, "They vote politicians who are just busy to become candidates, not those who really work for people's livelihoods."

The People Power Party (PPP) criticised him for "using anti-patriotic regional card". Kwon Young-jin, the Mayor of Daegu, harshly condemned the remarks, saying, "Don't ever think to come here without any sincere apology."

The Democratic Party faced crushing defeats at the by-elections, where it lost Seoul and Busan mayorship to the PPP.

== Personal life ==
Lee was married to Lee Jung-sook; they have a daughter and a son. When Lee Kwang-jae was removed from the Gangwon governorship, speculations suggested that Lee Jung-sook might run for the by-election, but she refused to do so.

He is a Buddhist.

== Works ==
=== Books ===
- Dream of a Spring Water (2004)
- Book Report of Lee Kwang-jae (2008)
- I Can't Dip My Feet Twice in a Same River (2010)
- Asking China: Superpower DNA of the 21st Century (2012)
- Where Should Korea Go To? (2014)
- Roh Moo-hyun Was Correct (2020)

=== Film ===
- Our President (2017)

== Election results ==
=== General elections ===
Year	Elections	Constituency	Political party	Votes (%)	Remarks
2004	17th National Assembly General Election	Taebaek–Yeongwol–Pyeongchang–Jeongseon (Gangwon)	Uri	39,061 (46.66%)	Won
2008	18th National Assembly General Election	Taebaek–Yeongwol–Pyeongchang–Jeongseon (Gangwon)	UDP	42,321 (54.57%)	Won
2020	21st National Assembly General Election	Wonju A (Gangwon)	Democratic (2015)	45,224 (48.56%)	Won
2024	22nd National Assembly General Election	Seongnam Bundang A (Gyeonggi)	Democratic (2015)	76,578 (46.72%)	Defeated (2nd)
2026	2026 By-election	Hanam A (Gyeonggi)	Democratic (2015)	44,216 (49.68%)	Won

=== Local elections ===
==== Governor of Gangwon ====
Year	Elections	Constituency	Political party	Votes (%)	Remarks
2010	5th Iocal Election	Gangwon (Governoral Elections)	Democratic (2008)	388,443 (54.36%)	Won
2022	8th Iocal Election	Gangwon (Governoral Elections)	Democratic (2015)	347,766 (45.92%)	Defeated (2nd)

National Assembly of the Republic of Korea
Preceded by Kim Yong-hak	Member of the National Assembly for Taebaek–Yeongwol–Pyeongchang–Jeongseon (Gangwon); 30 May 2004–26 April 2010	Succeeded by Choi Jong-won
Preceded by Kim Ki-sun	Member of the National Assembly for Wonju A (Gangwon); 30 May 2020–29 April 2022	Succeeded by Park Jung-ha
Preceded by Choo Mi-ae	Member of the National Assembly for Hanam A (Gyeonggi); 4 June 2026–	Incumbent
Political offices
Preceded by Kim Jin-sun	Governor of Gangwon; 1 July 2010–27 January 2011	Succeeded by Kang Ki-chang (acting); Choi Moon-soon
Preceded by Lee Choon-suak	Secretary-General of the National Assembly; 22 July 2022–28 December 2023	Succeeded by Baek Jae-hyun
