= Cho Han-ki =

South Korean politician (born 1966)

- 조한기

Deputy Secretary-General of the Democratic Party
- In office 9 September 2020 – May 2021 Serving with Kim Chul-min
- Leader: Lee Nak-yon

Private Secretary to the President
- In office 26 June 2018 – 23 August 2019
- President: Moon Jae-in
- Preceded by: Song In-bae
- Succeeded by: Shin Jee-yeon

Secretary to the President for Protocol
- In office May 2017 – 25 June 2018
- President: Moon Jae-in
- Succeeded by: Kim Jong-chun

Personal details
- Born: 25 September 1966 (age 60)
- Party: Democratic
- Education: Yonsei University

Cho Han-ki (Korean: 조한기; Hanja: 趙漢起; born 25 September 1966) is a South Korean politician previously served as secretary to the President Moon Jae-in from 2017 to 2019.

Upon the beginning of President Moon's presidency in 2017, Cho was appointed as Moon's protocol secretary. During Office of the President staffer reshuffle in June 2018, he was reshuffled to his personal secretary. In August 2019 he resigned for the upcoming 2020 general election. Cho previously worked with Moon at his presidential campaigns as a director of new media support team in 2012 and a deputy director of social media team in 2017.

In September 2020, newly elected leader of his party, Lee Nak-yon, appointed Cho as Deputy Secretary-General for Future overseeing party's communications on digital and social media platforms. In 2021 by-elections in the country's populous cities of Seoul and Busan, Cho will lead party campaign's task force on fake news.

Cho first entered politics in 2000 when he was employed as a secretary to then-parliamentarian Lee Mi-kyung. From 2003 to 2006 he worked at now-Ministry of Culture, Sports and Tourism as a policy advisor to the Minister. In April 2006, he was reshuffled to the Prime Minister's Office as protocol secretary to then-Prime Minister Han Myeong-sook. He continued working with Han when Han resigned from the office in 2007 and became elected parliamentarian in 2008 as her secretary. Later that year, Cho worked for then-parliamentarian Choi Moon-soon and after Choi became the Governor of Gangwon Province in 2011 he worked as Choi's special advisor on political affairs.

Cho holds a bachelor's degree in English language and literature from Yonsei University.

== Electoral history ==
Election	Year	District	Party affiliation	Votes	Percentage of votes	Results
19th National Assembly General Election	2012	Seosan–Taean (South Chungcheong)	Democratic United Party	26,357	28.31%	Lost (3rd)
By-election	2014	Seosan–Taean (South Chungcheong)	New Politics Alliance for Democracy	22,945	37.76%	Lost (2nd)
20th National Assembly General Election	2016	Seosan–Taean (South Chungcheong)	Democratic Party of Korea	39,326	37.29%	Lost (2nd)
21st National Assembly General Election	2020	Seosan–Taean (South Chungcheong)	Democratic Party of Korea	56,127	44.20%	Lost (2nd)
22nd National Assembly General Election	2024	Seosan–Taean (South Chungcheong)	Democratic Party of Korea	66,222	48.44%	Lost (2nd)
