= Seodaemun A =

Constituency in Seoul, South Korea

- Single-member constituency for the National Assembly
- Location of the constituency
- District(s): Seodaemun District (part)
- Region: Seoul
- Electorate: 130,042 (2024)

Current constituency
- Created: 1988
- Seats: 1
- Party: Democratic Party
- Member: Kim Dong-ah
- Created from: Seodaemun–Eunpyeong

Seodaemun A (Korean: 서대문구 갑) is a constituency of the National Assembly of South Korea. The constituency consists of parts of Seodaemun District, Seoul. As of 2024, 130,042 eligible voters were registered in the constituency. The constituency was created in 1988 from the Seodaemun–Eunpyeong constituency.

== History ==
Kang Seong-mo of the right-wing Democratic Justice Party was the first member to represent the constituency having won with 37.04% of the vote. Kang lost his bid for re-election and was succeeded by Kim Sang-hyun of the centre-left Democratic Party. Kim won re-election in 1996 but was not re-nominated ahead of the 2000 election. He was succeeded by Lee Sung-heon of the centre-right Grand National Party who won in a tight race against Woo Sang-ho of the Millennium Democratic Party. Lee Sung-heon and Woo Sang-ho would continue to face off in rematches in Seodaemun A as the mainstream conservative and liberal party candidates respectively until the 2020 South Korean legislative election.

In the 2004 South Korean legislative election, Woo Sang-ho of the Uri Party narrowly defeated incumbent Lee Sung-heon by a margin of 1,899 votes. However, in the following election held in 2008, Lee won the seat back by a wide margin and securing 51.64% of the vote. In the 2012 election, Woo won the seat back, securing 54.36% of the vote in a one-on-one battle against Lee Sung-heon. Woo won re-election in 2016 and 2020 with 54.88% and 53.24% of the vote respectively, defeating former assemblyman Lee Sung-heon in both matches.

Ahead of the 2024 South Korean legislative election, Woo Sang-ho announced that he would not be standing for re-election in Seodaemun A. After holding a party primary, the Democratic Party nominated lawyer Kim Dong-ah as the party's candidate for the constituency on March 11, 2024. Kim Dong-ah went on to win the general election with 50.75% of the vote, defeating Lee Yong-ho of the People Power Party.

== Boundaries ==
The constituency encompasses the neighborhoods of Hongje 1-dong, Hongje 2-dong, Bugahyeon-dong, Cheonyeon-dong, Chunghyeon-dong, Sinchon-dong, and Yeonhui-dong. It borders the constituencies of Seodaemun B to the north, Mapo B to the west, Mapo A to the south, Jung–Seongdong B and Jongno to the east.

== List of members of the National Assembly ==
Election	Member	Party	Dates	Notes
1988	Kang Seong-mo	Democratic Justice	1988–1992	CEO Rinnai Korea
1992	Kim Sang-hyun	Democratic	1992–2000	Left the Millennium Democratic Party and joined the Democratic People's Party on February 27, 2000
1996	Kim Sang-hyun	National Congress (Note: member of the Democratic People's Party from February 27, 2000)	1992–2000	Left the Millennium Democratic Party and joined the Democratic People's Party on February 27, 2000
2000	Lee Sung-heon	Grand National	2000–2004	Secretary for Political Affairs (1994–1996)
2004	Woo Sang-ho	Uri	2004–2008	
2008	Lee Sung-heon	Grand National	2008–2012	Mayor of Seodaemun (2022–2026)
2012	Woo Sang-ho	Democratic United	2012–2024	Floor leader of the Democratic Party (2016–2017); Interim leader of the Democratic Party (2022); Senior Secretary for Political Affairs (2025–2026); Governor of Gangwon State (2026–)
2016	Woo Sang-ho	Democratic	2012–2024	Floor leader of the Democratic Party (2016–2017); Interim leader of the Democratic Party (2022); Senior Secretary for Political Affairs (2025–2026); Governor of Gangwon State (2026–)
2020	Woo Sang-ho	Democratic	2012–2024	Floor leader of the Democratic Party (2016–2017); Interim leader of the Democratic Party (2022); Senior Secretary for Political Affairs (2025–2026); Governor of Gangwon State (2026–)
2024	Kim Dong-ah	Democratic	2024–present	

== Election results ==
=== 2024 ===
Legislative Election 2024: Seodaemun A
Party	Candidate	Votes	%	±%
Democratic	Kim Dong-ah	44,890	50.75	▼2.49
People Power	Lee Yong-ho	38,466	43.49	▲1.85
Reform	Lee Kyung-sun	5,087	5.75	new
Rejected ballots		1,506	–	
Turnout		89,949	69.2	▲0.15
Registered electors		130,042		
Democratic hold		Swing		

=== 2020 ===
Legislative Election 2020: Seodaemun A
Party	Candidate	Votes	%	±%
Democratic	Woo Sang-ho	47,980	53.24	▼1.64
United Future	Lee Sung-heon	37,522	41.64	▲1.37
Independent	Shin Ji-ye	2,916	3.23	new
Minjung	Jeon Jin-hee	1,026	1.13	new
National Revolutionary	Ko Sang-il	331	0.36	new
Our Republican	Shin Min-ho	330	0.36	new
Rejected ballots		991	–	
Turnout		91,096	69.05	▲6.83
Registered electors		131,930		
Democratic hold		Swing		

=== 2016 ===
Legislative Election 2016: Seodaemun A
Party	Candidate	Votes	%	±%
Democratic	Woo Sang-ho	42,972	54.88	▲0.52
Saenuri	Lee Sung-heon	31,529	40.27	▼5.36
Green	Kim Young-jun	2,206	2.81	new
Minjoo	Lee Jong-hwa	1,586	2.02	new
Rejected ballots		1,138	–	
Turnout		79,431	62.22	▲4.74
Registered electors		127,642		
Democratic hold		Swing		

=== 2012 ===
Legislative Election 2012: Seodaemun A
Party	Candidate	Votes	%	±%
Democratic United	Woo Sang-ho	40,481	54.36	▲10.87
Saenuri	Lee Sung-heon	33,982	45.63	▼6.01
Rejected ballots		656	–	
Turnout		75,119	57.48	▲9.17
Registered electors		130,670		
Democratic United gain from Saenuri		Swing		

=== 2008 ===
Legislative Election 2008: Seodaemun A
Party	Candidate	Votes	%	±%
Grand National	Lee Sung-heon	33,463	51.64	▲7.83
United Democratic	Woo Sang-ho	28,185	43.49	new
New Progressive	Chung Hyeon-jeong	2,637	4.06	new
Family Party for Peace and Unity	Noh Hak-woo	509	0.78	new
Rejected ballots		562	–	
Turnout		65,356	48.31	▼15.49
Registered electors		135,281		
Grand National gain from United Democratic		Swing		

=== 2004 ===
Legislative Election 2004: Seodaemun A
Party	Candidate	Votes	%	±%
Uri	Woo Sang-ho	38,795	46.06	new
Grand National	Lee Sung-heon	36,896	43.81	▼3.2
Millennium Democratic	Kim Young-ho	3,893	4.62	▼40.54
Democratic Labor	Chung Hyeon-jeong	3,721	4.41	new
United Liberal Democrats	Park Jong-won	529	0.62	▼1.56
Independent	Koh Eun-seok	384	0.45	new
Rejected ballots		649	–	
Turnout		133,030	63.80	▲8.18
Registered electors		133,030		
Uri gain from Grand National		Swing		

=== 2000 ===
Legislative Election 2000: Seodaemun A
Party	Candidate	Votes	%	±%
Grand National	Lee Sung-heon	34,623	47.01	▲7.7
Millennium Democratic	Woo Sang-ho	33,259	45.16	new
Democratic People's	Lee Dong-woo	2,128	2.89	new
Youth Progressive	Park Se-jeung	2,029	2.76	new
United Liberal Democrats	Lee Ui-dal	1,604	2.18	▼5.05
Rejected ballots		630	–	
Turnout		74,273	55.62	▼4.0
Registered electors		133,530		
Grand National gain from Democratic People's		Swing		

=== 1996 ===
Legislative Election 1996: Seodaemun A
Party	Candidate	Votes	%	±%
National Congress	Kim Sang-hyun	29,979	40.10	new
New Korea	Lee Sung-heon	29,388	39.31	▼1.11
Democratic	Park Kyung-san	8,610	11.51	new
United Liberal Democrats	Lee Ui-dal	5,407	7.23	new
Independent	Koh Eun-seok	1,372	1.83	–
Rejected ballots		1,052	–	
Turnout		75,808	59.62	▼10.83
Registered electors		127,154		
National Congress hold		Swing		

=== 1992 ===
Legislative Election 1992: Seodaemun A
Party	Candidate	Votes	%	±%
Democratic	Kim Sang-hyun	42,591	45.49	new
Democratic Liberal	Kang Seong-mo	37,843	40.42	new
Unification National	Ryu Gap-jong	13,178	14.07	new
Rejected ballots		1,177	–	
Turnout		94,789	70.45	▼0.3
Registered electors		134,548		
Democratic gain from Democratic Liberal		Swing		

=== 1988 ===
Legislative Election 1988: Seodaemun A
Party	Candidate	Votes	%	±%
Democratic Justice	Kang Seong-mo	36,097	37.04	–
Reunification Democratic	Kim Sang-hyun	30,598	31.39	–
Peace Democratic	Kim Hak-min	23,054	23.65	–
New Democratic Republican	Shin Soon-won	5,621	5.76	–
Our Justice	Oh Jae-kwan	1,341	1.37	–
Independent	Koh Eun-seok	736	0.75	–
Rejected ballots		765	–	
Turnout		98,212	70.75	–
Registered electors		138,825		
Democratic Justice win (new seat)				

== See also ==
- List of constituencies of the National Assembly of South Korea
