= Yoo Song-hwa =

South Korean politician (born 1968)

- 유송화
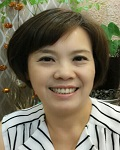
- Image of Yoo Song-hwa

Director of the Chunchugwan Press Center at the Blue House
- In office 9 January 2019 – 15 January 2020
- President: Moon Jae-in
- Preceded by: Kwon Hyuk-ki
- Succeeded by: Han Jung-woo

Private Secretary to the First Lady
- In office 17 May 2017 – 8 January 2019
- Succeeded by: Shin Jee-yeon

Personal details
- Born: 6 April 1968 (age 58) Goheung County, South Jeolla Province, South Korea
- Party: Democratic
- Education: Ewha Womans University; University of Seoul; Dongguk University

Yoo Song-hwa (Korean: 유송화; Hanja: 兪松和; born 6 April 1968) is a South Korean politician who previously served as the Director of the Chunchugwan Press Center at the Blue House under President Moon Jae-in - the third woman to assume such post.

Upon the beginning of Moon's presidency, Yoo was appointed as the Private Secretary to the First Lady Kim Jung-sook. As part of the Blue House staffer reshuffle in January 2019, she was promoted to the Director of the Press Center, Chunchugwan, at the Blue House, the only secretary-level staff at the Office of the President not working at secretariat buildings. She is the third woman to assume the post after Kim Hyun and Seo Young-kyo who were appointed by President Roh Moo-hyun 11 years ago.

In January 2020, Yoo resigned from the post to stand for the upcoming general election in April. She applied to run as her party's candidate for Seoul Nowon A constituency but lost the primary to the incumbent Ko Yong-jin (Korean: 고용진).

Yoo previously served as a Nowon District Council member from 1995 to 2002. In the 2002 election, she was placed as the number 6 of the proportional list but could not be elected as a Seoul Metropolitan Council member. In 2003 she joined then-President-elect Roh Moo-hyun's transition team and later Offices of Senior Presidential Secretaries for civil societies and personnel affairs. She later worked for her party as public relations staff and later standing deputy spokesperson. In 1988 she was the president of Ewha Womans University's student union.

Yoo holds two degrees - a bachelor in economics from Ewha Womans University and a master's in urban administration from the University of Seoul. She also completed a doctorate programme on North Korean studies at Dongguk University.

== Electoral history ==
Election	Year	Post	Party affiliation	Votes	Percentage of votes	Results
1st Local Election	1995	Member of Nowon District Council	Independent	3,069	30.63%	Won
2nd Local Election	1998	Member of Nowon District Council	Independent	4,335	55.18%	Won
3rd Local Election	2002	Member of Seoul Metropolitan Council (proportional representation)	Democratic Party (2000)	1,277,362	37.04%	Lost
