= Choi Moon-soon =

South Korean politician (born 1956)

Choi Moon-soon 최문순 崔文洵
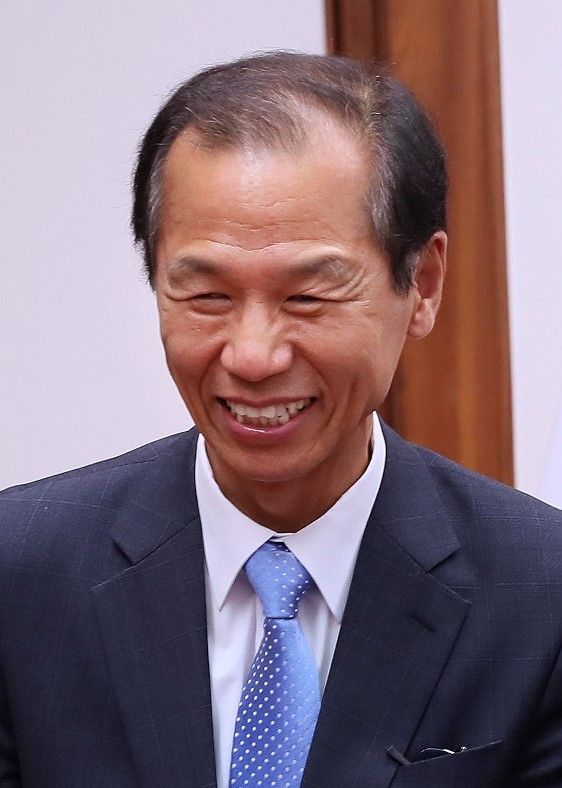

Governor of Gangwon
- In office 28 April 2011 – 30 June 2022
- Preceded by: Lee Kwang-jae; Kang Ki-chang (acting)
- Succeeded by: Kim Jin-tae

Personal details
- Born: 4 February 1956 (age 70) Chuncheon, Gangwon, South Korea
- Party: Democratic
- Spouse: Lee Soon-woo
- Education: Seoul National University, Department of English Literature(Master of Arts)
- Profession: Politician, Journalist

Military service
- Branch/service: Republic of Korea Army
- Rank: Sergeant

Korean name
- Hangul: 최문순
- Hanja: 崔文洵
- RR: Choe Munsun
- MR: Ch'oe Munsun

Choi Moon-soon (Korean: 최문순; born February 4, 1956) is a South Korean politician who was the Governor of Gangwon Province.

== Career ==
After graduating the university, he worked as an investigative journalist of the Munhwa Broadcasting Corporation (MBC) network for almost two decades, and later served as a chief executive officer of MBC from 2005 to 2008, He then served as a Member of the National Assembly from 2008 to 2011. He, with his three generation family, is recognized as an 'elite status of veterans', which certified on the Military Manpower Agency.

== Governorship ==
=== First term (2011–2014) ===
He was elected at the special bi-election for the 36th governorship of Gangwon at April 27, 2011. During his first term, he helped to host and prepare the upcoming 2018 Winter Olympics and Paralympics in Pyeongchang county and several venues in Gangwon province, with improving relevant infrastructures such as the construction of new Wonju-Gangneung railway, revitalizing Yangyang International Airport, etc.

=== Second term (2014–2018) ===
Choi was re-elected to a second term, on June 4, 2014. His second term, 37th governorship, started on July 1, 2014, with special debate of 'Meeting with Inhabitants', instead of a formal inauguration ceremony. When PyeongChang held the 2018 Winter Olympics and Paralympic games, Choi was given a Paralympic Order.

=== Third term (2018–2022) ===
Choi was re-elected to a third and last term, on June 13, 2018. His current term, 38th governorship, started on July 1, 2018, a formal inauguration ceremony. He is the first politician Democratic Party or its preceding parties to have served as Gangwon Governor for three times. In January 2020 he successfully recruited 2024 Winter Youth Olympics to Pyeongchang County using the existing facilities built for or used by 2018 Winter Olympics.

== Personal life ==
Choi, a Buddhist, lives in Chuncheon with his wife. He and his wife has 2 daughters. He also has been working as a chairperson of public-owned sports club Gangwon FC, since elected as the provincial governor in 2011.

== Education ==
- Graduated, Chuncheon High School
- Bachelor of Arts, Department of English Education, Kangwon National University
- Master of Arts, Department of English Literature, Seoul National University

== See also ==
- Min Byung-hee, incumbent Superintendent of the Gangwon Provincial Office of Education
- Park Won-soon, Mayor of Seoul, one of his fellow head of metropolitan council.
- Ahn Hee-jung, former Governor of South Chungcheong Province.
- Ohm Ki-young, rival candidate of 2011 special election; former CEO of MBC(his successor).
- Lee Kwang-jae, 35th Governor of Gangwon (2010–2011); his predecessor, colleague and 2018 Winter Olympics advocate.

== Election results ==
=== General elections ===
Year	Elections	Constituency	Political party	Votes (%)	Results
2008	18th National Assembly General Election	Proportional representation (10th)	UDP	4,313,645 (25.17%)	Elected

=== Local elections ===
==== Governor of Gangwon ====
Year	Elections	Constituency	Political party	Votes (%)	Remarks
2011	2011 By-election	Gangwon (Governoral Elections)	Democratic (2008)	293,509 (51.09%)	Won
2014	6th Iocal Election	Gangwon (Governoral Elections)	NPAD	381,338 (49.76%)	Won
2018	7th Iocal Election	Gangwon (Governoral Elections)	Democratic (2015)	518,447 (64.73%)	Won

Political offices
Preceded by Lee Kwang-jae; Kang Ki-chang (acting)	Governor of Gangwon; 28 April 2011 – 30 June 2022	Succeeded by Kim Jin-tae
National Assembly of the Republic of Korea
Preceded by	Member of the National Assembly from Proportional representation (10th, United Democratic Party); 30 May 2008–28 February 2011	Succeeded by
