= Shin Jee-yeon =

- 신지연

Private Secretary to the President
- In office 24 August 2019 – 9 May 2022
- President: Moon Jae-in
- Preceded by: Cho Han-ki

Private Secretary to the First Lady
- In office 9 January 2019 – 23 August 2019
- Preceded by: Yoo Song-hwa
- Succeeded by: Choi Sang-yeong

Secretary to the President for Foreign Press
- In office 24 May 2017 – 8 January 2019
- President: Moon Jae-in
- Succeeded by: Kim Ae-kyung

Personal details
- Born: 17 September 1967 (age 59)
- Education: University of Michigan; New York Law School

Shin Jee-yeon (Korean: 신지연; Hanja: 辛志娟; born 17 September 1967) is a South Korean lawyer who served as the private secretary (제1부속비서관) to the President Moon Jae-in at the Office of the President. She is the first woman to become the private secretary to the South Korean president and the first person to have served as private secretary to both the president and their spouse.

Shin was the deputy spokesperson for foreign press at Moon's first presidential campaign in 2012 which she joined after working for major law firms - Kim & Chang and Bae, Kim & Lee - and Samsung Engineering. She joined Moon's campaign again in 2017 as his coordinator for personal image. She was foreign press secretary in the beginning of President Moon's term but later reshuffled to private secretary to first lady Kim Jung-sook and now President Moon.

She holds a B.A. in Political Science from the University of Michigan and a J.D. from New York Law School in June 1998.
