= Korea at the 2018 Winter Olympics (disambiguation) =

Korea at the 2018 Winter Olympics refers to Korea and the Olympics. It may refer to one of the Korean teams at the 2018 Winter Olympics.

- Korea at the 2018 Winter Olympics (IOC code: COR), the unified team composed of Olympians from North Korea and South Korea, playing together under one flag and anthem
- South Korea at the 2018 Winter Olympics (IOC code: KOR), the Republic of Korea team composed of South Koreans playing under the South Korean flag and anthem
- North Korea at the 2018 Winter Olympics (IOC code: PRK), the Democratic People's Republic of Korea team composed of North Koreans playing under the North Korean flag and anthem
- 2018 Winter Olympics, held in PyeongChang, South Korea; with related venues, effects and environment at the Winter Olympics
  - Venues of the 2018 Winter Olympics and Paralympics
  - Pyeongchang bid for the 2018 Winter Olympics

== See also ==
- Korea at the Olympics (disambiguation)
