= Park Jung-hyun (politician) =

South Korean politician

- 박정현

Member of National Assembly
- Incumbent
- Assumed office 30 May 2024
- Preceded by: Park Young-sun
- Constituency: Deadeok (Daejeon)

Mayor of Daedeok District
- In office 1 July 2018 – 30 June 2022
- Preceded by: Park Soo-beom
- Succeeded by: Choi Chung-Kyu

Member of Daejeon Metropolitan Council
- In office 1 July 2014 – 12 March 2018
- Constituency: Seo District 4th district
- In office 1 July 2010 – 30 June 2014
- Constituency: proportional representation

Personal details
- Born: 4 November 1964 (age 61)
- Party: Democratic
- Education: Chungnam National University

Park Jung-hyun (Korean: 박정현; Hanja: 朴貞炫; 4 November 1964) is a South Korean politician serving as Mayor of Daedeok District of Daejeon and Daejeon's first woman district mayor from July 2018.

Before entering politics in 2010, Park had worked at environmental organisations most notably as Green Korea United's deputy secretary general from 2008 after Kim Je-nam and its Daejeon-Chungnam branch's secretary general from 1997.

In the 2010 election, Park was placed as the top of the proportional list of her party. In 2011 she resigned from vice-chair of Industry and Construction Committee of Daejeon Metropolitan Council over issuing Municipal bond to fund the construction of accommodation for Daejeon Hana Citizen, a football club owned by the City.

In the 2014 election, Park was re-elected. Since then, she took multiple roles in her party such as vice chair of its Women's Committee, vice chair of its Special Committee on Fine Dust and co-spokesperson of Moon Jae-in's second presidential campaign in Daejeon.

In the 2018 election, Park defeated the incumbent Daedeok Mayor from opposition party becoming the first woman mayor of any of 5 districts in Daejeon. She is also the first mayor of Daedeok not from now-United Future Party or its preceding parties in 12 years.

Park holds LLB from Chungnam National University.

== Electoral history ==
Election	Year	Post	Party affiliation	Votes	Percentage of votes	Results
5th Local Election	2010	Member of Daejeon Metropolitan Council (proportional representation)	Democratic Party (2008)	174,876	29.83%	Elected
6th Local Election	2014	Member of Daejeon Metropolitan Council from Seo District's 4th district	New Politics Alliance for Democracy (NPAD)	18,583	49.38%	Won
7th Local Election	2018	Mayor of Daedeok District	Democratic Party	50,263	57.85%	Won
8th Local Election	2022	Mayor of Daedeok District	Democratic Party	34,840	46.63%	Defeated
22nd National Assembly General Election	2024	Member of National Assembly from Daedeok District	Democratic Party	49,273	50.92%	Won
