= Park Jung-hyun =

Park Jung-hyun may refer to:

- Park Jung-hyun, known as Lena Park, American-born South Korean singer
- Park Jung-hyun (politician), South Korean politician
