= Jeong-Dong Lee =

South Korean academic (born 1967)

- 이정동

Special Advisor to the President on Economy and Science
- Incumbent
- Assumed office 23 January 2019
- President: Moon Jae-in

Personal details
- Born: 1967 (age 58–59) Daegu, South Korea
- Education: Seoul National University

Jeong-dong Lee (Korean: 이정동; Hanja: 李正東; born 1967) is a Korean academic currently serving as the Special Advisor to the President on Economy and Science since his appointment by President Moon Jae-in in January 2019. He is a professor of Interdisciplinary Graduate Program on Technology Management, Economics and Policy (TEMEP) and the Department of Industrial Engineering at Seoul National University, Korea.

== Education ==
Prof. Jeong-Dong Lee got a Bachelor's, Master, and Ph.D. in engineering at Seoul National University.

== Career ==
His main research topics include firm dynamics, productivity and efficiency analysis, evolutionary economics, economics of technological change, etc.

He published five books and edited two, including Productivity, Efficiency and Economic Growth in the Asia Pacific Region by Springer Verlag in 2008. Lee also published more than 70 articles in peer-reviewed academic journals, such as the Economic Modelling, Industrial and Corporate Change, Energy & Environment, Energy Economics, Energy Policy, Scientometrics, Journal of Productivity Analysis, Small Business Economics, Technological Forecasting and Social Change, Applied Economics, International Journal of Industrial Organization, Technovation, Journal of the Operations Research Society, Mathematical and Computer Modeling, and Asian Journal of Technology Innovation. He served as the principal coordinator for the Asia Pacific Productivity Conference (APPC) in 2006 and 2018 as the president of Korean Productivity Association (KPA) in 2011, and as the president of Korean Corporation Management Association in 2017.

He has been a member of the National Academy of Engineering of Korea (NAEK) since 2018. He served as an editor of science and public policy, Oxford Journal, from 2018. He has been active in providing consultations for the government and private sectors.

== Honors and awards ==
- 신양공학학술상, 서울대학교 공과대학, 2011. 12.
- Awards for Excellence, Emerald Literati Network 2010, Emerald Group Publishing Limited
- SBS해외학술연구기금 수상, 2008. 5.
- 한국생산성학회, 학술상, 2003. 6.
- 부품소재기술상 (공헌부문, 장관표창), 2003. 11.

== Bibliography ==
=== Journal articles ===
- Hoyoon Lee, Euy-Young Jung, and Jeong-Dong Lee (2019). Public–private co-evolution and niche development by technology transfer: A case study of state-led electricity system transition in South Korea, Energy Research & Social Science, 49, 103–113.
- Hayoung Park, Taewon Kang, and Jeong-Dong Lee (2018). R&D dynamics and firm growth: The importance of R&D persistency in the economic crisis, International Journal of Innovation Management, 1950049, 1-24.
- Taewon Kang, Chulwoo Baek, and Jeong-Dong Lee (2018). R&D activities for becoming a high-growth firm through large jumps: evidence from the Korean manufacturing, Asian Journal of Technology Innovation, 26(2), 222–245.
- Hun Jun Lee, Jeong-Dong Lee, and Chulwoo Baek (2017), Productivity dynamics and the cleansing effect of two recessions: Evidence from the manufacturing sector in Korea, Pacific Economic Review, 22(4), 677–701.
- Taewon Kang, Chulwoo Baek, and Jeong-Dong Lee (2017). The Persistency and Volatility of the Firm R&D Investment: Revisited from the Perspective of Technological Capability, 46(9), 1570–1579.
- Jungsub Yoon, Yoonhwan Oh, and Jeong-Dong Lee (2017). The impact of policy consistency on technological competitiveness: A study on OECD countries. Energy Policy, 108, 425–434.
- Yoonhwan Oh, Dong-hyun Oh, and Jeong-Dong Lee (2017). A sequential global Malmquist productivity index: Productivity growth index for unbalanced panel data considering the progressive nature of technology. Empirical Economics, 52(4), 1651–1674.
- Sungmoon Jung, Jeong-Dong Lee, Won-Sik Hwang, and Yeongjun Yeo (2017), Growth versus equity: A CGE analysis for effects of factor-biased technical progress on economic growth and employment, Economic Modelling, 60, 424–438.
- Yoonhwan Oh, Jungsub Yoon, and Jeong-Dong Lee (2016). Evolutionary Patterns of Renewable Energy Technology Development in East Asia (1990–2010). Sustainability, 8(8), 721.
- Gihyun Kwak, and Jeong-Dong Lee (2016). How an Economic Recession Affects Qualitative Entrepreneurship: Focusing on the Entrepreneur's Exit Decision. Managerial and Decision Economics.
- . Chanyoung Hong and Jeong-Dong Lee (2016), Macroeconomic effects of R&D tax credits on small and medium enterprise, Economic Systems Research 28(4), 467–481.
- Inha Oh, Seunghwan Oh, Almas Heshmati and Jeong-Dong Lee (2016), Can energy service companies promote 'green' growth?: The Korean case, Energy & Environment 26, 420–433.
- Keunsup Choi, Chulwoo Baek, and Jeong-Dong Lee (2016), Growth of de alio and de novo firms in the new and renewable energy industry, Industry and Innovation 23(4), 295–312.
- Yeongjun Yeo, Dongnyok Shim, Jeong-Dong Lee and Jörn Altmann (2015), Driving forces of CO2 emissions in emerging countries: LMDI decomposition analysis on China and India's residential sector, Sustainability, 7(12), 16108–16129.
- Inha Oh, Yeongjun Yeo, and Jeong-Dong Lee (2015), Efficiency versus equality: Comparing design options for indirect emissions accounting in the Korean emissions trading scheme, Sustainability, 7(11), 14892–15002.
- Youngkyu Kim, Inha Oh, and Jeong-Dong Lee (2015), Economic Impact Assessment of Public-Private Matching Fund Programs using Firm-Level Data, The Singapore Economic Review, 60(4), 1-25.
- Won-Sik Hwang and Jeong-Dong Lee (2015). A CGE analysis for quantitative evaluation of electricity market changes. Energy Policy, 83, 69–81.
- Heewon Yang, Jeong-Dong Lee, and Sungmoon Jung (2015), Arms and butter: The economic effect of an increase in military expenditure, Journal of Policy Modeling, 37(4), 596–615.
- Junho Na, Jeong-Dong Lee and Chulwoo Baek (2015), Is the service sector different in size heterogeneity?, Journal of Economic Integration and Coordination, published online
- Nabaz T. Khayyat and Jeong-Dong Lee (2015). A measure of technological capabilities for developing countries. Technological Forecasting and Social Change, 92, 210–223.
- Yeong Jun Yeo, Jeong-dong Lee, Inha Oh (2014), The Effects of Policy Portfolio for Greenhouse Gases Reduction and Renewable Energy Expansion: An Analysis Using Computable General Equilibrium, Asian Research Policy, 5(1), 48–69.
- Won-Sik Hwang, Inha Oh, and Jeong-Dong Lee (2014), The Impact of Korea's Green Growth Policies on the National Economy and Environment, The B.E. Journal of Economic Analysis & Policy, 14(4), 1585–1613.
- Chanyoung Hong and Jeong-Dong Lee (2014), Validation of an R&D-based computable general equilibrium model, Economic Modelling, 42, 454–463.
- Won-Sik Hwang, Inha Oh, and Jeong-Dong Lee (2014), Assessing the socio-economic effects of Korea's nuclear power policy, Energy & Environment, 25(5), 931–952.
- Sang-choon Lee, Dong-hyun Oh, and Jeong-Dong Lee (2014), A new approach to measuring shadow price: Reconciling engineering and economic perspectives, Energy Economics, 46, 66–77.
- Won-Sik Hwang and Jeong-Dong Lee (2014), Inter-industry knowledge transfer and absorption via two channels: The case of Korea, Global Economic Review, 43(2),131-152.
- Chulwoo Baek, Euy-Young Jung, and Jeong-Dong Lee (2014), Effects of regulation and economic environment on the electricity industry's competitiveness: A study based on OECD countries, Energy Policy, 72, 120–128.
- Jongwuk Ahn, Dong-hyun Oh, Jeong-Dong Lee (2014), The scientific impact and partner selection in collaborative research at Korean universities, Scientometrics, 100(1), 173–188.
- Jeong-Dong Lee, Chulwoo Baek, Ho-sung Kim, and Jin-Seok Lee (2014), Development pattern of the DEA research field: A social network analysis approach, Journal of Productivity Analysis, 41(2), 175–186.

=== Books ===
- 이정동 외 (2017), 인공물의 진화, 서울: 서울대학교 출판부
- 이정동 (2017), 축적의 길, 서울: 지식노마드
- 이정동 (2015), 축적의 시간 (대표집필), 서울: 지식노마드
- 이정동, 박찬수, 박상욱(공역) (2014), 진화경제이론, Nelson and Winter 저, 서울: 지필출판사
- 이정동 (2011), 공학기술과 정책, 서울: 지호출판사
- 이정동, 오동현 (2011), 효율성 분석이론: DEA, 자료포락분석법, 서울: IB BOOKS
- Jeong-Dong Lee and Almas Heshmati (eds.) (2008), Productivity, Efficiency, and Economic Growth in the Asia Pacific Region, New York: Springer Verlag.
- Almas Heshmati and Jeong-Dong Lee (eds.) (2008), Micro-Evidence for the Dynamics of Industrial Revolution: The Case of the Manufacturing Industry in Japan and Korea, New York: NOVA Science Publishers.
