= Korea at the Olympics =

Korean Unification Flag

Korea at the Olympics may refer to:

- North Korea at the Olympics
- South Korea at the Olympics
- Korea at the 2018 Winter Olympics

== See also ==
- Korea at the 2018 Winter Olympics (disambiguation)
