= Kim Jin-tae (politician) =

South Korean politician (born 1964)

- 김진태
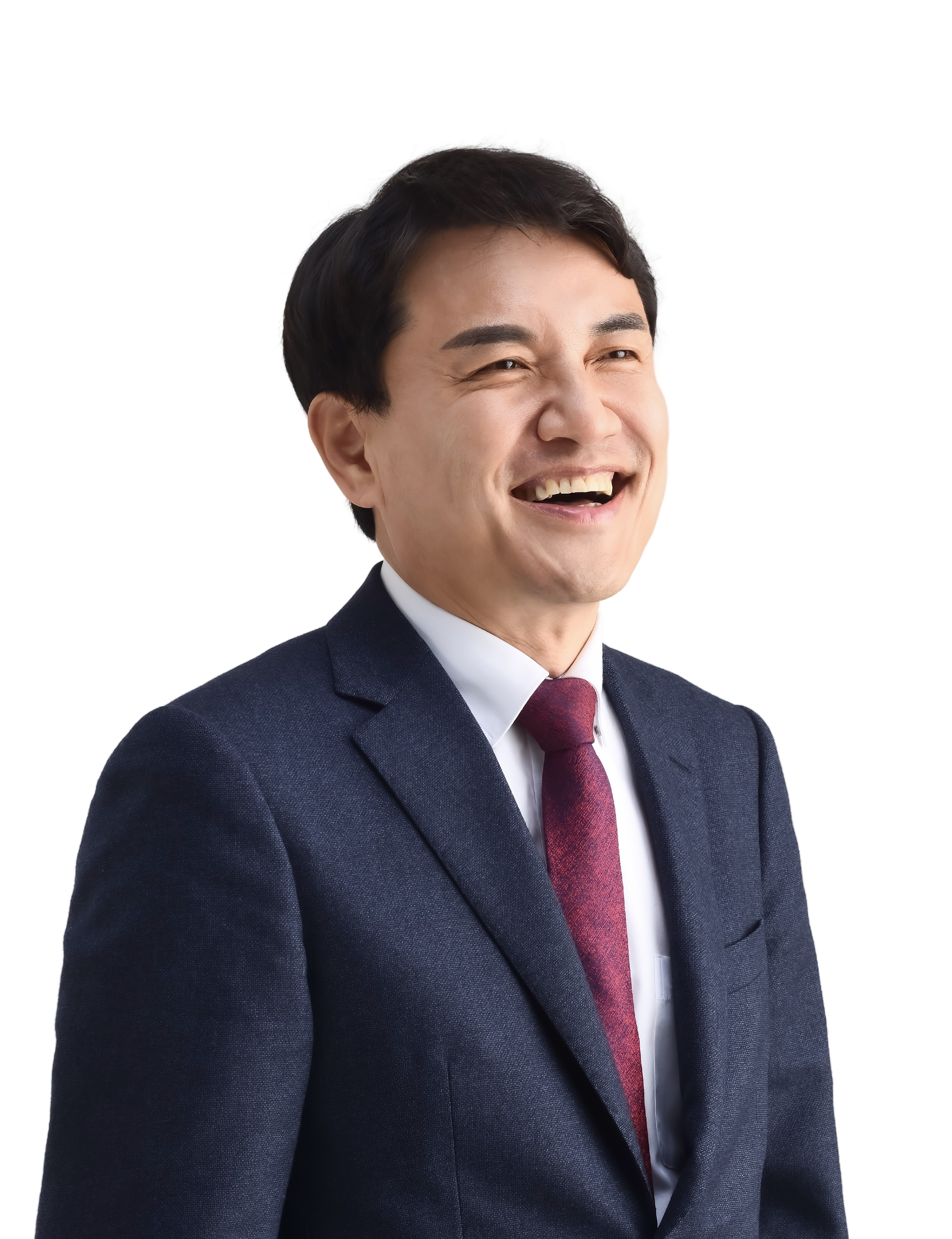

Governor of Gangwon State
- In office 1 July 2022 – 30 June 2026
- Preceded by: Choi Moon-soon
- Succeeded by: Woo Sang-ho

Member of the National Assembly
- In office 30 May 2012 – 29 May 2020
- Preceded by: Heo Cheon
- Succeeded by: Huh young (Chuncheon-Cheolwon-Hwacheon-Yanggu A, Gangwon); Han Ki-ho (Chuncheon-Cheolwon-Hwacheon-Yanggu B, Gangwon)
- Constituency: Chuncheon (Gangwon)

Personal details
- Born: 13 October 1964 (age 62) Chunchon, Gangwon, South Korea
- Party: People Power
- Spouse: Won Hyun-soon
- Education: Seoul National University
- Occupation: Prosecutor; Lawyer
- Website: www.kimjintae.co.kr

Korean name
- Hangul: 김진태
- Hanja: 金鎭台
- RR: Gim Jintae
- MR: Kim Chint'ae

Kim Jin-tae (Korean: 김진태; born 13 October 1964) is a South Korean politician and prosecutor who served as the Governor of Gangwon State from 2022 to 2026. He was a member of the National Assembly from 2012 to 2020.

== Early life ==
Kim Jin-tae was born on 13 October 1964 in Chunchon, South Korea. He entered Seoul National University School of Law in 1983.

== Early career ==
Kim passed the 28th judicial examination in 1986. He was after completing the 18th Judicial Research and Training Institute and commissioned as a prosecutor in 1992, he served as the director of the planning department of the Judicial Research and Training Institute and the director of the Organized Crime Division of the Supreme Prosecutors' Office. In 2009, he ended his official career as the chief of the Wonju Public Prosecutor's Office, and opened up as a lawyer in Wonju.

== Political career ==
Kim was nominated by the Saenuri Party in the 2012 legislative election and was elected in Chuncheon, Gangwon Province. In February 2016, he announced his candidacy for the 2016 legislative election and won the nomination of the Saenuri Party to win re-election by defeating the Democratic Party candidate Heo Young.

On 14 March 2017, he announced that he would run for presidential election. However, he was defeated by Hong Joon-pyo in the Liberty Korea Party presidential primary.

== Election results ==
=== General elections ===
Year	Elections	Constituency	Political party	Votes (%)	Results
2012	19th National Assembly General Election	Chuncheon (Gangwon)	Saenuri	58,629 (49.30%)	Won
2016	20th National Assembly General Election	Chuncheon (Gangwon)	Saenuri	66,374 (50.54%)	Won
2020	21st National Assembly General Election	Chuncheon–Cheorwon–Hwacheon–Yanggu A (Gangwon)	UFP	57,298 (43.93%)	Defeated (2nd)

=== Local elections ===
==== Governor of Gangwon ====
Year	Elections	Constituency	Political party	Votes (%)	Remarks
2022	8th Iocal Election	Gangwon (Governoral Elections)	PPP	409,461 (54.07%)	Won
2026	9th Iocal Election	Gangwon (Governoral Elections)	PPP	406,950 (48.18%)	Defeated (2nd)

Political offices
Preceded by Choi Moon-soon	Governor of Gangwon State; 1 July 2022–30 June 2026	Succeeded by Woo Sang-ho
National Assembly of the Republic of Korea
Preceded by Heo Cheon	Member of the National Assembly from Chuncheon (Gangwon); 30 May 2012–29 May 2020	Succeeded by Huh young (Chuncheon–Cheolwon–Hwacheon–Yanggu A, Gangwon); Han Ki-ho (Chuncheon–Cheolwon–Hwacheon–Yanggu B, Gangwon)
