= Woo Sang-ho (politician) =

South Korean politician (born 1962)

- 우상호
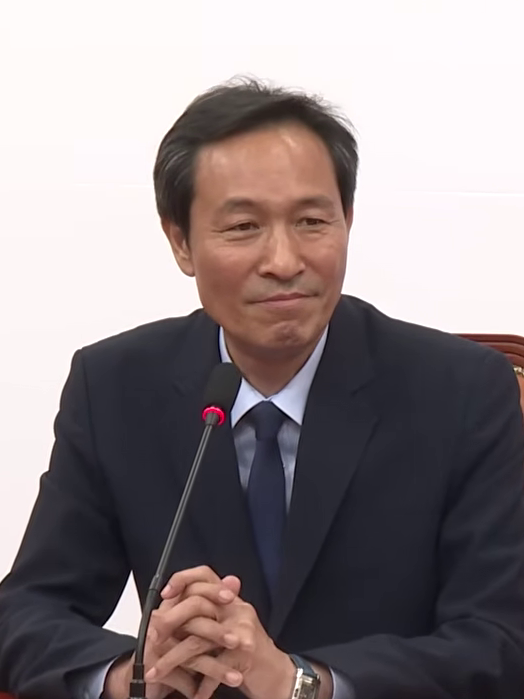
- Woo in 2025

Governor of Gangwon State
- Incumbent
- Assumed office 1 July 2026
- Preceded by: Kim Jin-tae

Leader of the Democratic Party
- Interim
- In office 7 June 2022 – 28 August 2022
- Preceded by: Park Hong-keun (Interim)
- Succeeded by: Lee Jae Myung

Member of the National Assembly
- In office 30 May 2012 – 29 May 2024
- Preceded by: Lee Sung-heon
- Succeeded by: Kim Dong-ah
- Constituency: Seodaemun A (Seoul)
- In office 30 May 2004 – 29 May 2008
- Preceded by: Lee Sung-heon
- Succeeded by: Lee Sung-heon
- Constituency: Seodaemun A (Seoul)

Senior Secretary to the President for Political Affairs
- In office 8 June 2025 – 19 January 2026
- President: Lee Jae Myung
- Prime Minister: Lee Ju-ho (acting); Kim Min-seok
- Preceded by: Hong Cheol-ho
- Succeeded by: Hong Ihk-pyo

Personal details
- Born: 12 December 1962 (age 63) Cheorwon, Gangwon, South Korea
- Party: Democratic
- Other political affiliations: List: NCNP (1996–2000); MDP (2000–2003); Uri (2003–2007); UNDP (2007–2008); Democratic (2008) (2008–2011); Democratic (2011) (2011–2014); NPAD (2014–2015)
- Spouse: Lee Hyun-joo
- Children: Woo Jong-hyuk; Woo Jong-ha; Woo Ji-soo
- Parent: Park Byung-hui (mother)
- Education: Yonsei University
- Occupation: Activist, politician

Korean name
- Hangul: 우상호
- RR: U Sangho
- MR: U Sangho

Woo Sang-ho (Korean: 우상호, born 12 December 1962) is a South Korean activist and politician who has served as the Governor of Gangwon State since 2026. A member of the Democratic Party of Korea (DPK), he previously served as the party's floor leader from 2016 to 2017 and as its interim leader from June to August 2022. He was the Member of the National Assembly for Seoul Seodaemun A from 2004 to 2008 and from 2012 to 2024.

Woo was born in Cheorwon, Gangwon, and raised in Seoul, where he attended Yongmoon High School. He joined student movements and took a crucial role during the June Struggle, while studying the Korean language at Yonsei University. Following his graduation in 1989, he joined politics during 1995 local elections. He first contested in 2000 election for Seodaemun A constituency but lost to Lee Sung-heon.

He was firstly elected in 2004, but lost again in 2008. After coming back to the National Assembly in 2012, he became the parliamentary leader of the Democratic Party in 2016. He took a crucial role during the 2016 political scandal that triggered the impeachment of the then President Park Geun-hye. He worked close to the Democratic presidential candidate Moon Jae-in who was elected in 2017.

In the 2018 local elections, Woo was one of the favorite candidates for the Seoul mayorship. He contested the Democratic preselection but lost to the then-Mayor, Park Won-soon. Following the death of Park in 2020, he ran again for Democratic preselection for the same position for the 2021 election but lost to Park Young-sun.

== Early life and education ==
Woo Sang-ho was born on 12 December 1962 in Cheorwon, Gangwon. He is the youngest of the three sons and a daughter of Park Byung-hui (died in 2013), a health centre worker. His father was born in 1916, as the eldest son of a landowner in Cheorwon, and studied at Chuncheon High School. He also studied physical education at Tokyo Imperial University (now University of Tokyo) in Tokyo, Japan. Nevertheless, following the surrender of Japan in 1945, his land was taken by the Workers' Party of North Korea as Cheorwan was north of the 38th parallel and therefore under the rule of Soviet Union. He moved to Busan during the Korean War, but following the Armistice Agreement, he married Park Byung-hui in Seoul and returned to Cheorwon. As Cheorwon was recovered by South Korea, he reassumed ownership of his land, but he sold it and built a school. A house was his sole property when his youngest son was born. He was a member of the Democratic Republican Party.

When Woo was a primary school Form 6 student, the family moved to Seoul, where his father rented a one-room with a shared tap and a toilet. He later described himself as "too poor" during these times and also revealed that he never had his own room until his marriage. At his secondary school, he was caned by his class teacher as he was unable to pay the school fees. All of his elder siblings had given up continuing their tertiary education due to unaffordable fees, despite high results. On the other hand, his mother was seriously willing to send him to a university and sought help from relatives.

Woo graduated from Yongmoon High School in 1981. He then attended Yonsei University, where he studied Korean language. During Year one and two, his aim was becoming a poet or Korean teacher. He was a member of Yonsei Literary Society, a club within his university. In May 1986, he received the Yun Tong-Ju Poetry Prize.

In 1984, his second elder brother became disabled after a traffic collision. He then committed suicide.

== Early career and political activities ==
Woo's interest in politics began in 1979, when President Park Chung Hee was assassinated. Though he had connections with several student activities during the early 1980s studying at the same university, he kept his distance with them on purpose.

He began his activist career while serving in the army in 1985, when South Korea held a general election on 12 February. Prior to the election, the newly formed opposition New Korea and Democratic Party (NKDP) was gradually gaining popularity among people. About a week before the election, his company commander ordered his soldiers, including him, not to vote for the NKDP, but he proceeded to cast his vote for the NKDP and was scolded by his company commander. Other than this incident, his colleague, Park Rae-goon (later the President of Human Rights Foundation Saram), visited his military camp and urged him to be an activist.

After being discharged from the national service in 1985, Woo subsequently joined a seminar team consists of the class of '84, following the suggestion of Oh Yeon-ho. Although Woo was the class of '81, he used an alias "Kang-ta, the class of '84, studying Korean language" to not fear his juniors. He did not initially inform his mother of his activism, but later told her.

In 1987, Woo was elected the President of the Student Council of Yonsei University. He also served as the 1st Deputy President of the Association of National University Student Representatives under its President Lee In-young.

On 13 April 1987, the then President Chun Doo-hwan announced that the upcoming presidential election would be an indirect election as usual under the incumbent constitution. The announcement, oppositions and activities strongly objected to, provoked the June Struggle. Woo organized mass protests against the government's decision on 10 June, the same day with the party election of the then ruling Democratic Justice Party (DJP), where Roh Tae-woo was elected its presidential candidate. A day before, they held a practical protest at Yonsei University, but one of the member Lee Han-yeol, who was also a junior to Woo, collapsed to the ground after a tear gas fired by the suppression forces hit his head. He was immediately brought to a hospital but died on 5 July after being in coma for about a month. Woo organised Lee's funeral and kept his portrait along with Woo Hyun and Ahn Nae-sang; both are now actors.

The mass demonstrations against the military dictatorship led the DJP President and presidential candidate Roh Tae-woo to announce the 29 June Declaration to complete the transition to democracy. However, policemen who caused the death of Lee Han-yeol were not arrested, and Woo Sang-ho was heading to the Seoul District Public Prosecutors' Office to complain about the issue. He and Woo Hyun were subsequently arrested by police at Daehan Gate of Deoksugung and were tortured at Seoul Namdaemun Police Station. The torture was stopped after the detective in charge had recognized that Woo was the President of the Student Council of Yonsei University. Instead, Woo was jailed for contempt of the country following an interview with Nicholas Kristof from The New York Times where he compared the South Korean government to the Nazis. Initially, he was imprisoned at Seoul Detention Centre (formerly Seodaemun Prison) in November 1987, but was relocated to newly built Seoul Detention Centre in Uiwang as the old dentention centre in Seoul was closed.

Following his release in 1988, Woo was one of the founding member of Gyeryong Alpine Club, along with the first leadership board of the ANUSR. He also served as a member of the Steering Committee of the Patriotic Youth Association in 1989 and the Deputy Spokesperson of the National Union for Democracy and Ethnic Reunification in 1992. He was also a Planning Committee member of Monthly Mal. Other than political activities, he also established Youth Information and Culture Centre in 1994, and served as the managing director of Video Graphics in 1997.

== Political career ==
=== Early political career (1988–2004) ===
His political activities were begun in the 1995 local elections. Although he did not contest, he gave his support to a Seoul mayoral candidate. The next year, he was brought into the National Congress for New Politics (NCNP), the main opposition party formed by Kim Dae-jung.

Woo contested the 2000 election for the Seodaemun A constituency. A year before, the then incumbent MP Kim Sang-hyun was seeking re-election, but also showed his intention that the upcoming new party (later named as the Millennium Democratic Party; MDP) should hold a preselection for the constituency. As Woo was likely to be the candidate for the constituency, Kim condemned the party and showed an opinion polling that indicated that Kim was more capable than Woo. Despite Kim's criticism, Woo officially won the MDP preselection on 17 February. Kim did not accept the result and subsequently withdrew from the MDP. He later joined the newly formed Democratic National Party.

As the MDP candidate, Woo contested against the GNP candidate Lee Sung-heon, his senior whom he met at Yonsei University. Woo gained popularity under the slogan "Young politics, clean politics" but lost to Kim on 13 April by a small margin (Lee: 47.01%, Woo: 45.16%). Following the election, he briefly worked as a visiting researcher at Colorado State University in 2001.

Prior to the 2002 presidential election, Woo invited Roh Moo-hyun, who was considering to run for the upcoming presidential election, to Seodaemun A constituency, where Woo was the party's division leader after he lost. He endorsed Roh, whom he was inspired by. At that time, Roh was far behind Lee In-je, who was the most favoured candidate of the MDP. During the presidential primary, Woo went to Gangwon and urged its party members to vote for Roh, but could only gain support from 14 people. Nevertheless, on 24 March, Roh barely defeated Lee in Gangwon by a margin of 7 votes (Roh: 630, Lee: 623). Roh then was officially elected the MDP presidential candidate, but was challenged within the party following the party's huge defeat in 2002 local elections, as well as the appearance of Chung Mong-joon. Several party members including Kim Min-seok (a former Seoul mayoral candidate who lost to Lee Myung-bak) against Roh quit the party and formed the Council for a Unity Candidate (CUC) that endorsed Chung. Several MPs accused CUC and established the National Participation Movement Headquarter, where Woo was its Deputy Head, to support Roh. However, Chung had withdrawn and agreed to back Roh. On 19 December, Roh defeated the GNP candidate Lee Hoi-chang and was elected the 16th President of South Korea.

The MDP was, however, under crisis after Roh took an oath as the President of the Republic. MPs from both the MDP and the GNP who sought political reforms subsequently left the party. Roh himself also quit the MDP on 29 September 2003. In October, Woo was also one of the MPs withdrawn from the MDP. They established a new party named the Uri Party, but Roh did not join until 2004.

=== First term as Member of the National Assembly (2004–2008) ===
The 2004 election was held amid the controversial impeachment of Roh Moo-hyun. The de facto ruling Uri Party was expected to win the majority. In the election, Woo contested again for Seodaemun A constituency against the then incumbent MP and the GNP candidate Lee Sung-heon. Woo was leading in various polls and on 15 April, and he successfully defeated Lee.

During his first year, the abolition of the controversial National Security Act had been an crucial issue in politics. Many Uri MPs, including Woo, supported abolition. During an interview with People's Solidarity for Participatory Democracy, he said that he would persuade other MPs to get endorsements. Nevertheless, not all Uri MPs were advocating for abolition, and the main opposition GNP strongly objected the bid. The Uri Party finally decided to support abolition, but the vote failed to pass amid the internal conflicts and strong oppositions from the GNP. The party leadership immediately faced harsh criticism and collapsed on 3 January 2005.

Prior to the 2006 local elections, Woo was appointed the new Spokesperson of the Uri Party under the new Chairman Chung Dong-young. After the party had chosen the former Justice Minister Kang Kum-sil as its Seoul mayoral candidate, Woo subsequently joined her campaign. However, the election was a crushing defeat of the Uri Party, where the party only secured the North Jeolla governorship. Kang, who was leading the early polls, lost to the GNP candidate Oh Se-hoon by a wide margin.

In the 2008 election, Woo faced his second rematch against Lee Sung-heon. He promised to make Seodaemun as the "district of prestigious education", as well as opposing Yeonhui-dong Chinatown masterplan proposed by the Seoul Mayor Oh Se-hoon. He, however, came far behind to Lee amid high popularity of the new government of Lee Myung-bak. On 9 April, he received 28,142 votes (43.50%) and lost to Lee.

=== Extra-parliamentary career and return (2008–2012) ===
On 14 August 2009, after about a year he lost, Woo was appointed the new Spokesperson of the Democratic Party following the resignation of Kim Yoo-jung. His return was regarded as the return of the 386 Generation.

In the 2012 election, Woo sought his return as an MP for Seodaemun A constituency. He faced the 4th challenge against Lee Sung-heon, who was contesting under the Saenuri banner at that time. Though many opinion polls showed that both candidate were neck and neck or Woo came behind to Lee, Woo was leading in the exit polls (Woo: 56.3%, Lee: 43.7%). In the end, he received 40,481 votes and defeated Lee, making a comeback to the National Assembly after 4 years.

=== Parliamentary leader of the Democratic Party (2016–2017) ===
==== Election ====
In the 2016 election, the main 2 opposition parties — the Democratic Party, and the People's Party, won a majority upset victory. Woo again defeated Lee Sung-heon in his 5th matchup since 2000. On 29 April 2016, shortly after his re-election as an MP, Woo officially launched his bid for the Democratic Party parliamentary leadership. In the declaration, he mentioned that the election result (where the ruling Saenuri Party lost majority) was the people's mandate and urged the oppositions to unite against the ruling party. He criticised the Democratic Party for ignoring people's livelihoods due to internal conflict, and promised that he would forward 3 main agendas: to reduce the burden of people's lives, lower communication costs, and cut private education costs. He also added that he would create new "stars" among one- or two-term MPs. He indicated that if he is elected, he would support first-term MPs to lead parliamentary reforms. He urged all party MPs to unite, emphasising that he would brook faction politics within the National Assembly.

On 4 May, Woo Sang-ho received 36 votes and therefore came behind of Woo Won-shik who obtained 40 votes. Since no candidates received a majority, a second round of voting was held in the afternoon. In the second round, Woo Sang-ho gained 63 votes and successfully defeated Woo Won-shik (56 votes), who was backed by the National Alliance for Democracy and Peace and pro-Sohn Hak-kyu factions. Several sources analysed that Woo Sang-ho was widely supported by both pro-Roh Moo-hyun and pro-Moon Jae-in factions.

==== Committee negotiations ====
The presidency of each parliamentary committee had become crucial as the Democratic Party won the most seats (123/300) but just one more than the Saenuri Party (122/300) in the April general election. Since non-conservative oppositions held majority seats, the Democratic Party had gained a chance to take the speakership, as well as most of the committee presidencies.

The negotiation on 8 June was done between Chung Jin-suk (Saenuri), Woo Sang-ho (Democratic) and Park Jie-won (People's), and the result was successful; eight each from the Saenuri and the Democratic, and two from the People's Party. Therefore, Saenuri Party lost 2 committees (the Foreign Affairs and Unification Committee and the Special Committee on Budget and Accounts) to the Democratic Party. The Legislation and Judiciary Committee, which was often regarded as the de facto "Senate", was taken by the Democratic Party during the last session (2012–2016), but was handed over to the Saenuri Party in this time. Nevertheless, the Democratic Party elected a new Speaker, Chung Sye-kyun, from its party.

==== Parliamentary leadership ====
On 8 May, Woo appointed 11 deputy parliamentary leaders, Lee Hoon (Planning Cluster), Back Hye-ryun (Law Cluster), Song Ki-hun, Kang Byung-won, Park Jeung, Yoo Dong-soo, Mun Mi-ock, An Ho-young, Oh Young-hun, Choi In-ho and Kim Byung-wook. All of them were first-term MPs from both pro-Roh Moo-hyun and pro-Sohn Hak-kyu factions. Straight News analysed Woo's decision as the purpose of internal unity.

Under his parliamentary leadership, Woo adopted a "member responsibility system", which officially enacts suggestions and alternatives brought during interpellations. The main reason of its adoption was "to suggest alternatives for the 9-year conservative governments' economic failures". According to the system, both the parliamentary leader and its first deputy oversee interpellations and parliamentary inspections, and the representative MPs are selected for each issue.

==== Hearing session of Baek Nam-gi ====
On 14 November 2015, a farmer named Baek Nam-gi was brought hospitalized after he was hit by a water cannon from the police. The incident provoked controversy, and on 26 May 2016, the Democratic Party promised to hold a hearing session to find the truth of the case.

However, as there were no progress, Woo criticised the Park Geun-hye administration for being "not cooperative" on 22 July. He also emphasised that a special hearing session must be held, and the people in charge should be responsible. On 3 August, 11 MPs from the Democratic Party, including Woo, visited Baek, who was in critical health, at Seoul National University Hospital. He told them that in case the Saenuri Party kept rejecting a hearing session, 3 opposition parties — Democratic, People's, and Justice, would proceed to reveal the truth.

In August, the so-called "West Hall Hearing" had been an issue that targeted Choi Kyoung-hwan and Ahn Jong-beom. Initially, Woo urged the government to hold a hearing that includes both, but later they were both excluded following a negotiation. Instead, both the Saenuri Party and the oppositions agreed to hold a hearing session of Baek Nam-gi.

The hearing session was held at the National Assembly Proceeding Hall on 12 September. Kang Shin-myung, the former National Police Agency Commissioner General during the incident, refused to apologise as "the incident occurred amid violent demonstration". Opposition MPs like Pyo Chang-won condemned his remarks.

Baek died on 25 September, after being in a coma for almost a year. The government's suggestion of a postmortem was harshly criticised by the bereaved family members and opposition politicians. Woo showed objeced towards the postmortem, indicating that "There's already a video recording his collapse, as well as medical opinions." He also accused the government for "using the incident to divide the nation". On 26 October, he also condemned the prosecution for not allowing the late's funeral.

==== Corruption Investigation Office for High-ranking Officials ====
On 19 July, Woo agreed with Park Jie-won, the then parliamentary leader of the People's Party, regarding an issue related to the proposed Corruption Investigation Office for High-ranking Officials (CIO). Two days later, Woo indicated that "various prosecution reforms were discussed but were never happened due to the strong objection from the Saenuri Party". He added that the establishment of the CIO is to enhance the South Korean democracy, as well as to get rid of corruptions from high-ranking officials. According to the suggestion, the CIO will investigate crimes related to one's duty, embezzlement and breach of trust, breach of the Political Fund Law, and so on.

The CIO was finally established on 21 January 2021, after the Democratic Party's overwhelming victory in the 2020 election.

==== 2016 political scandal ====
On 25 October 2017, Woo revealed to SisaIN what he had done during the political scandal in 2016. According to the interview, after he received reports related to Choi Soon-sil in July 2016, he formed a private task force with Cho Eung-cheon, Sohn Hye-won and Do Jong-hwan. As the issue gradually gained public attention, the Democratic Party suggested the removal of the then Minister of Agriculture, Food and Rural Affairs Kim Jae-soo in order to bring the issues to a proposed parliamentary inspection. The inspection was, however, crippled as the Saenuri Party boycotted it and the party President Lee Jung-hyun had launched a hunger strike "till the resignation of the Speaker Chung Sye-kyun". Lee stopped his protest after a week, and the Saenuri Party returned to the inspection.

The approval ratings of the then President Park Geun-hye plummeted following a report of JTBC about Choi Soon-sil on 24 October. Various netizens, students, celebrities and politicians urged Park to step down. Thousands and millions of people demonstrated against the government.

Rather than impeach her from the beginning, Woo set three-level strategies: go away-resign-impeach. Initially, he called Park to confess and go away from politics. He later told SisaIN that Park visited the National Assembly Proceeding Hall on 8 November and said, "the new Prime Minister will be elected by the National Assembly, and will oversee the Cabinet". However, according to his possible outcome, "go away" would only form a national unity government that could split between the oppositions and the protesters, and Woo, who has suggested the moderate approaches, would fall into a crisis. The Democratic Party then urged Park to resign on 15 November. On 21 November, both the Democratic Party and the People's Party agreed to impeach Park. On the other hand, a confrontation happened between two parties, as the Democratic Party supported the impeachment vote on 2 December, while the People's Party wanted it on 9 December. The latter was confirmed following a negotiation with the 2 parties and the Justice Party. Woo later revealed to SisaIN that if the former was adopted, the oppositions might not get enough votes from the Saenuri MPs.

On 9 December, 234 out of 300 MPs (1 did not attend) voted in favour of the impeachment of Park. The same day, a photo was taken, where Woo raised his right hand in greeting to someone. The photo has later become viral as the "someone" was a bereaved family member to a victim of the MV Sewol tragedy. On 10 March 2017, the Constitutional Court upheld the impeachment in a unanimous 8–0 decision.

The impeachment of the first female president of the country provoked the snap presidential election on 9 May. In the election, Moon Jae-in, the most favourable candidate, was elected the new President of the Republic.

=== Democratic in government (2017–2022) ===
Following the inauguration of the new President Moon Jae-in, it was rumoured tha Woo would be appointed as the new Minister of Unification. He denied the claim, saying that "those fresh and capable talents should be the ministers." He also added that he would keep contributing for the success of the new government from the National Assembly.

In early 2019, Woo was considered the most likely person to be the new Minister of Culture, Sports and Tourism. On the other hand, when a cabinet reshuffle was announced on 8 March, his name was excluded. Initially, the Democratic Party spokesperson Lee Hae-sik said that the party President Lee Hae-chan dissuaded Woo for entering the Cabinet. On 11 March, Lee revealed that the Blue House was not willing to appoint too many long-term MPs into the Cabinet.

In the 2020 election, Woo faced the 6th challenge from Lee Sung-heon, whom he defeated with 47,980 votes.

On 8 June 2021, Woo was one of 12 MPs expelled or received a "quit order" from the party. This was following a controversy of breaching the Agricultural Land Act. The incident occurred when he acquired an agricultural land to bury his mother's body after her death in 2013. He, however, did not accept the party's decision, indicating that he is farming at there.

On 27 January 2022, Woo was appointed General Election Director of the Democratic Party for the presidential election on 9 March. In the election, however, its presidential candidate Lee Jae Myung, ended up with losing to Yoon Suk Yeol. On 15 March, Woo announced he would not conteset for Seoul mayorship at the June local elections in order to take responsibilities for the party's defeat at the presidential election. Instead, he was considered a potential candidate for Gangwon governorship, although the former Governor Lee Kwang-jae became the candidate.

=== Interim President of the Democratic Party (2022) ===
Following the crushing defeat of the Democratic Party at the June local election, Woo was unanimously nominated interim President of the Democratic Party.

On 13 June, the temporary leadership body was established, including Seo Nanyee, who was elected Member of the North Jeolla Provincial Council at the local election on 1 Jule; she is also the youngest councillor.

=== Governor of Gangwon State (2026–present) ===
Woo was elected as Governor of Gangwon State in the 2026 South Korean local elections. He defeated People Power Party nominee Kim Jin-tae with 51.8 percent of the vote. Woo pledged to attract younger residents to the region by improving the local economy and living conditions.

== Seoul mayorship bid ==
=== First bid (2018) ===
On 21 January 2018, Woo announced his intention to run for the Seoul mayorship in the upcoming local election. He was the first Democratic pre-candidate to launch a bid. He said, "I will run for the Seoul mayorship to help the success of the Moon Jae-in government and change the world". He indicated that citizens are disapproving the then incumbent Park Won-soon's intention to run for the 3rd term.

On 11 March, Woo officially launched his bid at Sejong Centre for the Performing Arts. He cited that the gap between so-called "3 districts of Gangnam (Gangnam, Seocho and Songpa)" and the rest has become wider, and pledged he would balance both areas. He added he would overcome daily issues, for example, (several taxi drivers') refusals to accept passengers, child abuse, and property bid rigging. He also ensured that he would focus on childcare issues, so that children shall be prioritised and mothers will feel comfortable.

However, in the Democratic preselection on 20 April, Woo could only secure 14.14% and came as 3rd. Park Won-soon was officially selected as the Democratic Seoul mayorship candidate with 66.26%. Initially, the party had already put a rule for preselections, where the incumbent MPs would face 10% of vote deductions in order to maintain its "largest party in the National Assembly" status, and this was applicable for both Woo Sang-ho and Park Young-sun. The day, Woo conceded his defeat and congratulated to Park Won-soon.

=== Second bid (2021) ===
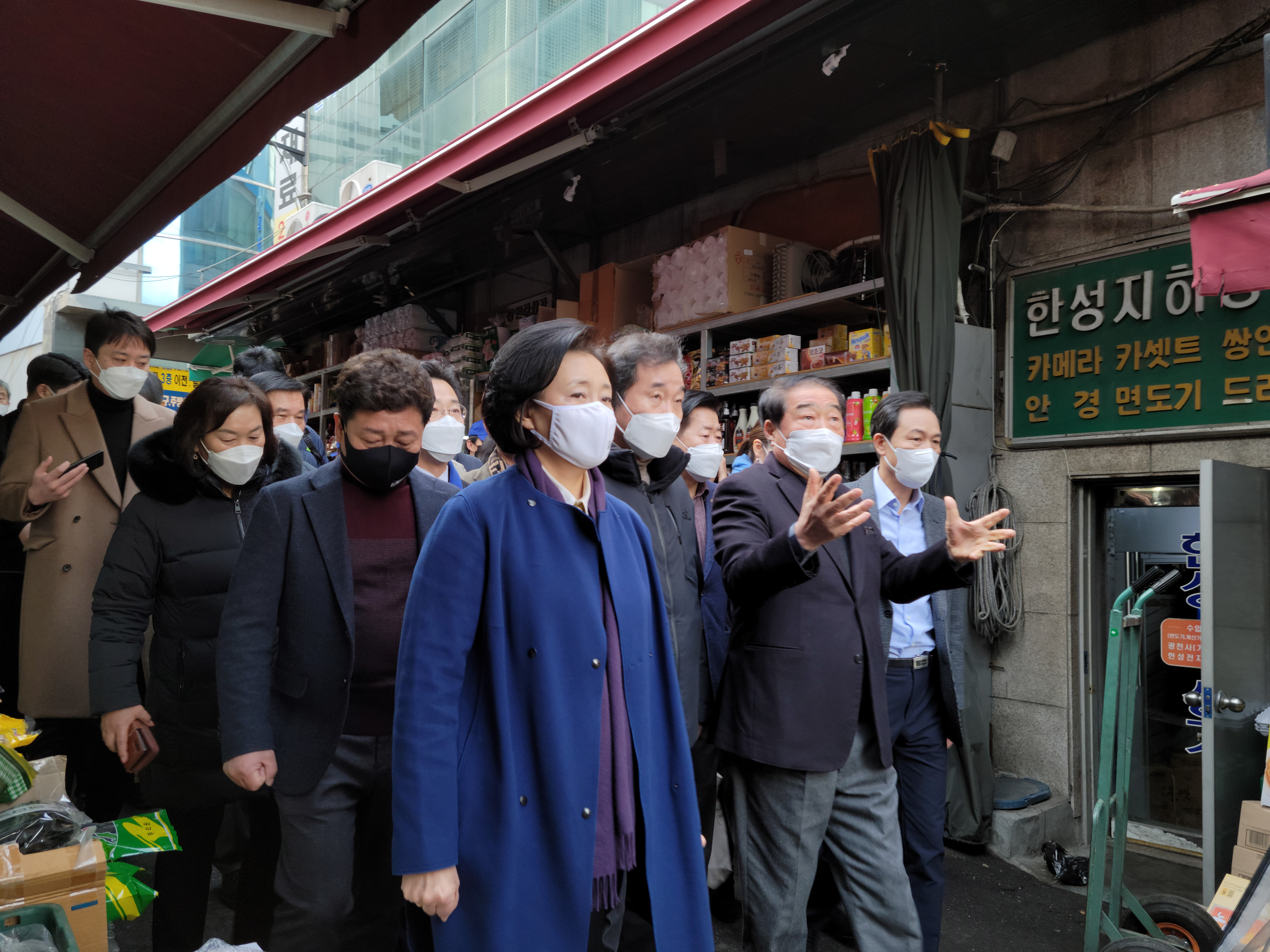
Woo Sang-ho, Park Young-sun and Lee Nak-yon visited Namdaemun Market, Central District on 23 January 2021

The unexpected death of Park Won-soon on 10 July 2020 caused a by-election on 7 April 2021.

On 13 December 2020, Woo again announced his intention to run for the Seoul mayorship. He also became the first Democratic pre-candidate to launch a bid in that race. He indicated that this would be the last election for him, and would not run for the 2024 general election under any circumstance. His promises were:

- Free COVID-19 vaccines for all citizens (including foreigners)
- Move all parts of the Seoul Underground to basement
- Supply 160 thousands of public housings within the city
- Ban all diesels until 2030, as well as new registrations of petrol cars

On 5 February 2021, the Democratic Party has confirmed that Woo Sang-ho and Park Young-sun would be the pre-candidate for preselection.

On 23 February, Woo visited the Korean Confederation of Trade Unions (KCTU) Seoul branch. He said, "I was supposed to join labour movements, but then shifted to student movements because all of my juniors were arrested." He emphasised himself as a "people- and labour-friendly candidate", citing that he is the sole candidate to have released a labour manifesto. Before this, he already announced his "7 Labour Manifestos" on 7 February, which were: preparing labour criteria of Seoul, establishing the Civil Labour Council, expanding rest areas for migrant workers, expanding pro-youth public sectors, establishing the Seoul Labour Safety and Health Centre, continuing "Pro-Labour Metropolitan City" project, and forming the Labour Politics Association.

==== Candidate unity ====
On 12 January 2021, Woo signed for an agreement with an Open Democratic Party (ODP) MP Kim Jinai, stating that both parties will put only one candidate if both of them are elected their parties candidates respectively. On 7 February, he met Chung Bong-ju, the ODP pre-candidate, and again agreed to put a single candidate but with a condition, which is that both parties must be merged.

==== Endorsements ====
On 4 January 2021, Woo was endorsed by the former Chief of Staff to the President Im Jong-seok.

On 17 February, Kwak Sang-uhn, the son-in-law to the former President Roh Moo-hyun, endorsed Woo.

==== Result ====
Woo received 30.44% of the vote and lost to Park Young-sun, who obtained 69.56%, in the Democratic preselection on 1 March. He was defeated by Park in both party member votes and opinion polling. He subsequently conceded his defeat and congratulated Park for winning the preselection.

== Political positions ==
A notable politician of the 386 Generations (also called as 486 or 586 depends on decades), Woo is widely described as a centrist. He is regarded as a "factionless" politician. On 19 March 2013, he announced the dissolution of the Progressive Action faction, formed by 486 Generation politicians within the Democratic Unionist Party (DUP), and urged them to stop faction politics. Shortly after the 2016 election and being elected the parliamentary leader of the Democratic Party, he warned those new MPs to get rid of faction politics. Nevertheless, he categorises himself as pro-Roh Moo-hyun.

=== LGBT issues ===
Prior to 2021 Seoul mayoral election, Woo joined a meeting held at the National Assembly Proceeding Hall, along with Park Young-sun and the Democratic Party president Lee Nak-yon. When he was questioned by reporters regarding Queer Culture Festival, he replied, "I haven't considered the issue as I'm not elected yet, but will think about."

=== Capital punishment ===
Woo opposes capital punishment and supports to abolish it. On 20 March 2009, he posted on his website about the past life at prison. During that time, he met 2 condemned criminals jailed for multiple murder in 1986. One of them named Goh Keum-seok was a devout Buddhist who used to share foods provided to other prisoners, and were able to calm another condemned criminals down. Woo added that Goh was able to communicate with several warders. Goh was later executed. He later explained that since the incident, he felt somehow sceptical towards capital punishment.

=== Foreign affairs ===
==== Iraq war ====
During the Iraq war, the South Korean government considered to dispatching troops to Iraq. Initially, Woo was one of the vocal critics opposed the dispatch. During an interview with People's Solidarity for Participatory Democracy, he condemned the dispatch as "reasonless and horrible", adding that "there must be massacres against the prisoners, as well as mistaken bombing against the civilians". However, after the government had already sent their troops, he changed his opinion, saying that "it's easy to oppose, but was inevitable when considering the situation of Korea". His decision was criticised by several activists. Nevertheless, he was one of the Uri MPs who condemned President of the United States George W. Bush for rationalising the war.

==== North Korea ====
After being elected the parliamentary leader in 2016, Woo promised, "I will say what I have to say to North Korea." He denounced the 7th Congress of the Workers' Party of Korea as "illogical", adding that "denuclearisation while boosting nuclear armament is an unacceptable double standard." He again criticised North Korea in February 2017 when they shot a missile shortly after the inauguration of the newly elected US President Donald Trump. He indicated that the relationship between North Korea and the United States would deteriorate due to the preemptive shootings of North Korea. He added they would only boost the international sanctions.

In March 2017, Woo requested the United States government to adopt a hybrid policy towards North Korea, which mixes both sanctions and negotiations.

In June 2022, Woo criticised the President Yoon Suk-yeol for watching a film titled Broker at a cinema after North Korea launched a rocket.

==== China ====
At the beginning of the COVID-19 pandemic, the South Korean government prohibited the entry of all foreigners who visited Hubei starting from 4 February 2020. While several politicians criticised the decision as "too late", Woo appeared on Kim Ou-joon's News Factory on 3 February and expressed support.

==== Japan ====
In February 2013, Woo held Dokdo Photography Exhibition at the National Assembly Proceeding Hall for 3 days (20–22) to protest against Japan's so-called "Takeshima Day" celebrations. He condemned the Shimane prefectural government for infringing of South Korea's sovereignty. He assured that the Liancourt Rocks (called as "Dokdo" in South Korea, and "Takeshima" in Japan) belongs to South Korea, and indicated that it is impossible for Hinomaru to fly at the islands.

== Controversies ==
=== Millennial NHK incident ===
On 17 May 2000, several Millennium Democratic Party (MDP) MPs along with Woo Sang-ho and a poet Park Nohae went to a karaoke bar named Millennial NHK after the eve memorial ceremony of the Gwangju Uprising. This incident was revealed after Lim Su-kyung described it on the Internet. According to the post, Woo was swearing to Lim while being drunk. He and other MPs involved subsequently faced public backlashes. He later revealed that he had already apologised to public, as well as another people involved.

=== Song Seung-heon's national service issue ===
On 27 October 2004, several Uri Party MPs from the Culture and Tourism Committee including Woo had sent a letter to the Military Manpower Administration (MMA); the letter urged the MMA to delay the enlistment date of an actor Song Seung-heon so he could be cast in a drama named Sad Love Story. During that time, Song was criticised for defaulting the national service. Woo indicated, "If the issue is not settled, there will be negative consequences to the Korean wave." He was subsequently criticised online.

Song was replaced to Yeon Jung-hoon following the incident.

=== Violations of COVID-19 standard operating procedures ===
On 4 February 2021, Woo again provoked controversy when he took a photo with 15 other people including other MPs and several district mayors in Seoul at Sindorim Station. In the photo, all of them were holding hands with each other without practicing social distancing. The same day, he apologised, said that he was "inattentive".

On 8 April, a day after the by-election, Woo was reported that he and his companion were drinking with 4 other people at a BBQ restaurant in Central District, Seoul, which is not allowed under the law (only up to 5 people per table are allowed). Regarding this incident, he explained that he went to the restaurant along with 3 other people to have a dinner, but 4 people at another table described themselves as his "supporter", so he sat there for 5 minutes. The People Power Party (PPP), however, criticised his explanation and urged him to apologise.

=== Comment on Kang Nan-hee's letter ===
On 10 February 2021, Woo once again provoked a controversy when he wrote his opinion about a letter of Kang Nan-hee (widow of the former Seoul Mayor Park Won-soon) on his Facebook. He wrote, "I've seen Ms Kang Nan-hee's letter reported on media. Park Won-soon is my comrade from now (when I'm writing this post) till my death." He added, "I was almost crying while gritting my teeth. How hard he was! How could he bear!" He also indicated, "The late Park was my role model for an innovation, as well as a comrade discussing democracy and human rights together." Finally, he ended, "I will be the one to continue his policies and develop his dreams."

The post was widely regarded as "another harassment" against the victim, as Park committed suicide following an allegation of sexual harassments. It was subsequently condemned by opposition parties i.e. the People Power Party (PPP) and the Justice Party (JP). Cho Eun-hee, the Mayor of Seocho and one of the PPP pre-candidate for the Seoul mayorship, questioned him, "Are you going to continue Park's sexual harassments?" Oh Shin-hwan, another PPP pre-candidate, denounced Woo that "he would like to provoke another harassments" and urged him to immediately resign. Ahn Cheol-soo, the most favourable opposition pre-candidate, asked the Democratic Party to drop the "mad candidate", referring Woo. Following the public criticisms, Woo explained that he was consoling Park's bereaved family members and not advocating the late's sexual harassments.

On 18 February, the Minister of Gender Equality and Family Chung Young-ai indicated that Woo's remark was just "another harassment".

== Personal life ==
Woo married Lee Hyun-joo in 1991. Initially, her father, Lee Hwan-jong, opposed the marriage as his daughter was earning a living to a so-called "demonstrator" Woo. He is currently living in Seongbuk, although he enjoys most of time in Seodaemun (Woo's constituency).

Following their marriage in 1991, both Woo and Lee used to live together with Ahn Nae-sang, a famous actor. Both have 3 children — Woo Jong-hyuk, Woo Jong-ha and Woo Ji-soo. He also has a pet dog, named Woo Bom.

Woo is also a Protestant and the incumbent Deacon of Yeonhui-dong Church.

He is a smoker.

On 27 December 2020, Woo had close contact with a COVID-19 patient during an event. Although he tested negative, he underwent a 14-day voluntary self-quarantine. His quarantine period ended on 7 January 2021.

== Works ==
=== Books ===
- Bumpkin (2004)

=== Essays ===
- If I Can Be Anything in the World (2016)

== Election results ==
=== General elections ===
Year	Elections	Constituency	Political party	Votes (%)	Results
2000	16th National Assembly General Election	Seodaemun A (Seoul)	MDP	33,259 (45.16%)	Defeated (2nd)
2004	17th National Assembly General Election	Seodaemun A (Seoul)	Uri	38,795 (46.06%)	Won
2008	18th National Assembly General Election	Seodaemun A (Seoul)	UDP	28,185 (43.49%)	Defeated (2nd)
2012	19th National Assembly General Election	Seodaemun A (Seoul)	DUP	40,481 (54.36%)	Won
2016	20th National Assembly General Election	Seodaemun A (Seoul)	Democratic	42,972 (54.88%)	Won
2020	21st National Assembly General Election	Seodaemun A (Seoul)	Democratic	47,980 (53.24%)	Won

=== Local elections ===
==== Governor of Gangwon ====
Year	Elections	Constituency	Political party	Votes (%)	Remarks
2026	9th Iocal Election	Gangwon (Governoral Elections)	Democratic	437,583 (51.81%)	Won

National Assembly of the Republic of Korea
Preceded by Lee Sung-heon	Member of the National Assembly for Seodaemun A (Seoul); 30 May 2004–29 May 2008	Succeeded by Lee Sung-heon
Preceded by Lee Sung-heon	Member of the National Assembly for Seodaemun A (Seoul); 30 May 2012–29 May 2024	Succeeded by Kim Dong-ah
Political offices
Preceded by Hong Cheol-ho	Senior Secretary to the President for Political Affairs; 8 June 2025–19 January 2026	Succeeded by Hong Ihk-pyo
Preceded by Kim Jin-tae	Governor of Gangwon State; 1 July 2026–	Incumbent
Party political offices
Preceded by Lee Jong-kul	Floor Leader of the Democratic Party; 6 May 2016–16 May 2017	Succeeded by Woo Won-shik
Preceded by Park Hong-keun (Interim)	Interim Leader of the Democratic Party; 7 June 2022–28 August 2022	Succeeded by Lee Jae Myung
