= Kang Seong-mo =

South Korean entrepreneur and politician (1933–2023)

Member of the National Assembly of South Korea
- In office 30 May 1988 – 29 May 1992
- Preceded by: Kim Jae-gwang (Seodaemun–Eunpyeong, Seoul)
- Succeeded by: Kim Sang-hyeon
- Constituency: Seodaemun A (Seoul)

Personal details
- Born: 18 April 1933 Pukchong County, Korea, Empire of Japan
- Died: 5 February 2023 (aged 89)
- Party: DJP; DLP
- Education: Yonsei University
- Occupation: Entrepreneur

Kang Seong-mo (Korean: 강성모; 18 April 1933 – 5 February 2023) was a South Korean entrepreneur and politician. A member of the Democratic Justice Party and later the Democratic Liberal Party, he served in the National Assembly from 1988 to 1992.

Kang died on 5 February 2023, at the age of 89.

== Election results ==
Year	Elections	Constituency	Political party	Votes (%)	Results
1988	13rd National Assembly General Election	Seodaemun A (Seoul)	DJP	36,097 (37.04%)	Won
1992	14th National Assembly General Election	Seodaemun A (Seoul)	DLP	37,843 (40.42%)	Defeated (2nd)
