= Kim Je-nam =

South Korean politician (born 1963)

- 김제남
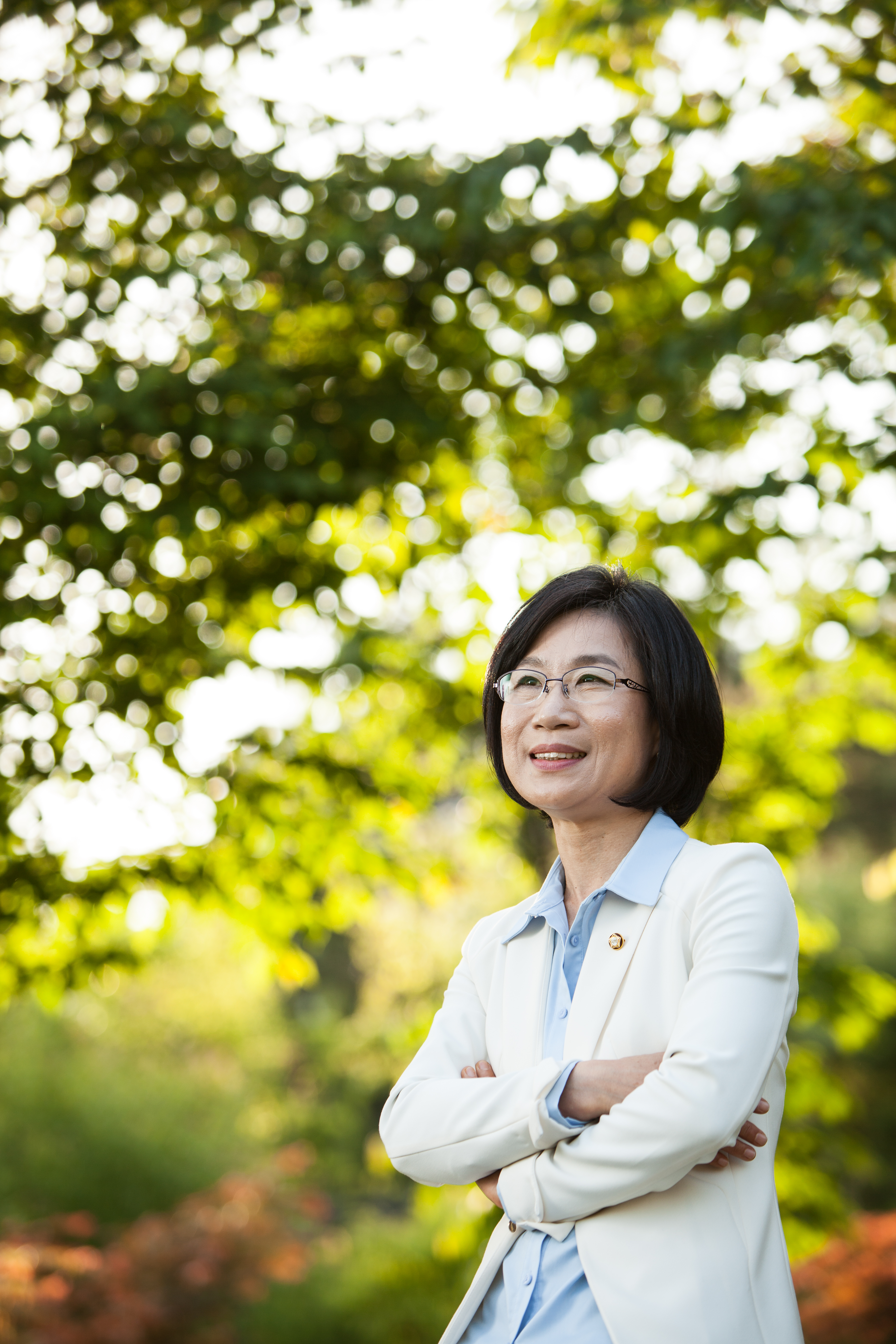

Senior Presidential Secretary for Civil Society
- In office 11 August 2020 – 28 May 2021
- President: Moon Jae-in
- Preceded by: Kim Keo-sung
- Succeeded by: Bang Jung-kyun

Secretary to the President for Climate and Environment
- In office 20 January 2020 – 10 August 2020
- President: Moon Jae-in
- Succeeded by: Park Jin-sub

Member of the National Assembly
- In office 30 May 2012 – 29 May 2016
- Constituency: Proportional representation

Personal details
- Born: 12 June 1963 (age 63)
- Party: Justice Party (South Korea)
- Education: Duksung Women's University

Kim Je-nam (Korean: 김제남; Hanja: 金霽南; born 12 June 1963) is a South Korean politician who served as President Moon Jae-in's Senior Presidential Secretary for Civil Society from 2020 to 2021. Kim was the first woman to ever assume such a post.

Before she was promoted to senior presidential secretary, Kim worked for Moon as his secretary for climate and the environment despite her previous political career as an opposition party parliamentarian and member. In May 2021 Kim was replaced by Bang Jung-kyun, a professor at Sangji University.

Before entering politics, Kim worked for civil societies for environment - most notably Green Korea United. Kim was one of central figures in merging three environmental organisations into Green Korea United in 1994. Kim led this organisation as its first Deputy Secretary General from its foundation to 2007.

In 2012 election Kim was placed as the number 5 on Unified Progressive Party's proportional representation list. In less than a half year later, Kim joined other well known progressive figures of her party such as Sim Sang-jung and Roh Hoe-chan in leaving their party and founding a new party, now-Justice Party. She joined her new party's leadership as its floor spokesperson from 2013 to 2015 and senior deputy floor leader from 2015 to 2016. In 2016 election, Kim withdrew her nomination and endorsed Kang Byungwon (Korean: 강병원) from Democratic Party after their agreed poll found Kang more likely to defeat Lee Jae-oh, a senior conservative parliamentarian.

Kim holds a bachelor's degree in history from Duksung Women's University.

== Electoral history ==
| Election | Year | District | Party affiliation | Votes | Percentage of votes | Results |
|---|---|---|---|---|---|---|
| 19th National Assembly General Election | 2012 | Proportional Representation | Unified Progressive Party | 2,198,405 | 10.30% | Won |
| 20th National Assembly General Election | 2016 | Seoul Eunpyeong B | Justice Party | N/A | N/A | Withdrew her candidacy |
