= Ohm Ki-young =

South Korean journalist (born 1951)

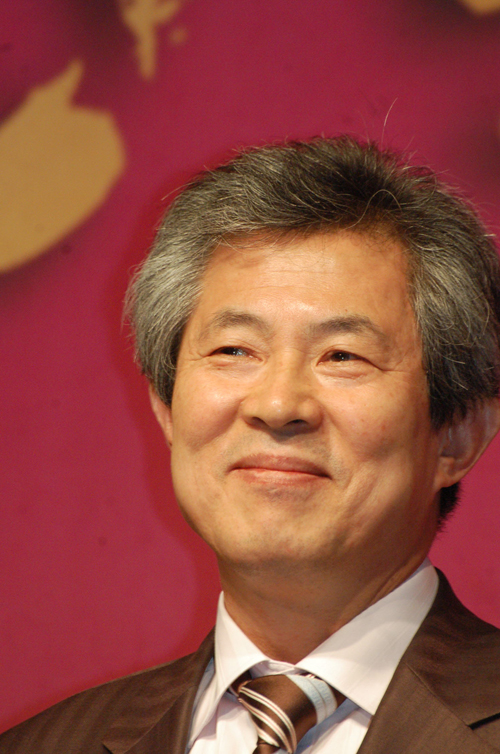

Korean name
- Hangul: 엄기영
- Hanja: 嚴基永
- RR: Eom Giyeong
- MR: Ŏm Kiyŏng

Ohm Ki-Young is a popular news anchor and the former CEO of Munhwa Broadcasting Corporation (MBC) in South Korea.

== Biography ==
Ohm Ki-Young was born in 1951. It is known that his hometown is Chuncheon, Gangwon province but it is actually Chungju, Chungcheong province. He studied sociology and graduated from Seoul National University in 1974. He is known for his career as an MBC News anchor. He had preserved his position as an anchor for 13 years, which is the record for the longest news anchor in Korea. Magazine T, an entertainment class magazine, declared him the most influential person in broadcasting in their article "The influential TOP 30 of broadcasting in Korea' in May, 2008.

== Career ==
Ohm started his career as a reporter in the social and economical department of MBC. He was in a plane crash in 1977 and nearly died. He got on a small plane to cover a local festival at Mt. Sorak but there was an accident. He was badly injured when the plane crashed. He was close to a vegetative state. Nonetheless, the cameraman and he were quite lucky to survive the accident. The captain and co-pilot died. He said "I have lived a second life since then. I believe that I live a life of the deceased as well as myself. I will make a return for this life by working for my country."

Ohm appeared on TV as a special correspondent to Paris in 1985. Then he attracted public attention because he always wore a trench coat when reporting news. His image was sophisticated to the Korean audience. A trench coat was unusual item for news correspondents in those days. Hence his colleagues and news audience gave him a nickname 'Burbbery Ohm'. In one interview, he said "At that time, the special correspondents' role was to show people the images of developed countries rather than to report stiff pieces of political news. That is because Korea was not such a developed country in 1980s and Koreans were eager to see 'the dream cities' on TV. Scenery of developed countries, that's what I showed people. Considering this role as a special correspondent, I preferred to wear a trench coat."

He became a news anchor in October, 1989. One of his expressions became popular, when he said "It is really absurd that this thing happened.(참으로 어처구니없는 일이 아닐 수 없습니다.)" after announcing an outrageous incident. It was so funny that several comedians mimicked him on TV. As he had maintained his position of a news anchor for a long time, people thought he was a trustworthy person. IPS, the Institute for Industrial Policy Studies, chose him for the No.1 Brand Power in the TV anchor field from 2004 to 2007. The Brand Power means that a person functioned in a society like a brand of a company. Thanks to him, MBC Newsdesk recorded higher viewer ratings than KBS 9 o'clock News in January, 2007 for the first time.

However, he made a serious mistake on July 26, 2007. He was reading the news that Taliban had abducted 23 Koreans. A moment before the camera turned to the special correspondent, Ohm accidentally smiled at the audience. Most of the audience was angry and condemned him for the accidental behavior. He made a public apology, "I apologize for making face.". Though he caught a lot of flak, the backlash was not that harsh owing to his good image.

Ohm stepped away from the MBC Newsdesk in order to run for the position of MBC CEO. He was elected as president and CEO in March 2008. As a president, he introduced innovations to change MBC. In those days MBC was criticized because one of its programs, PD Notes, circulated a false and exaggerated report about bovine spongiform encephalopathy (BSE, or "mad cow disease") on April 29, 2008. After the broadcast, hundreds of thousands of Koreans held a candlelight vigil for two months. The production crews of PD Notes were indicted for the false reports. Ohm and MBC made an official apology. He pronounced the Plan for Innovation of New MBC to improve the company.

== Recent incidents ==
On February 8, 2010, Ohm resigned from the presidency in protest against the unilateral selection of MBC board members by the Foundation of Broadcast Culture (FBC). MBC is 70% owned by the FBC, which in turn is controlled by the Korea Communications Commission (KCC), whose chairman is appointed directly by the Korean president. Thus, Ohm's resignation was interpreted as an opposition to the political pressure from the administration of President Lee Myung-Bak. Ohm was praised for taking an independent line and standing firm in his belief.

Since August, Ohm has been in negotiations with the Grand National Party who wish to nominate him as a candidate for Governor of Gangwon Province.

== Election results ==
=== Governor of Gangwon ===
Year	Elections	Constituency	Political party	Votes (%)	Remarks
2011	2011 By-election	Gangwon (Governoral Election)	GNP	267,538 (46.56%)	Defeated
