= Kim Dong-ah =

South Korean politician

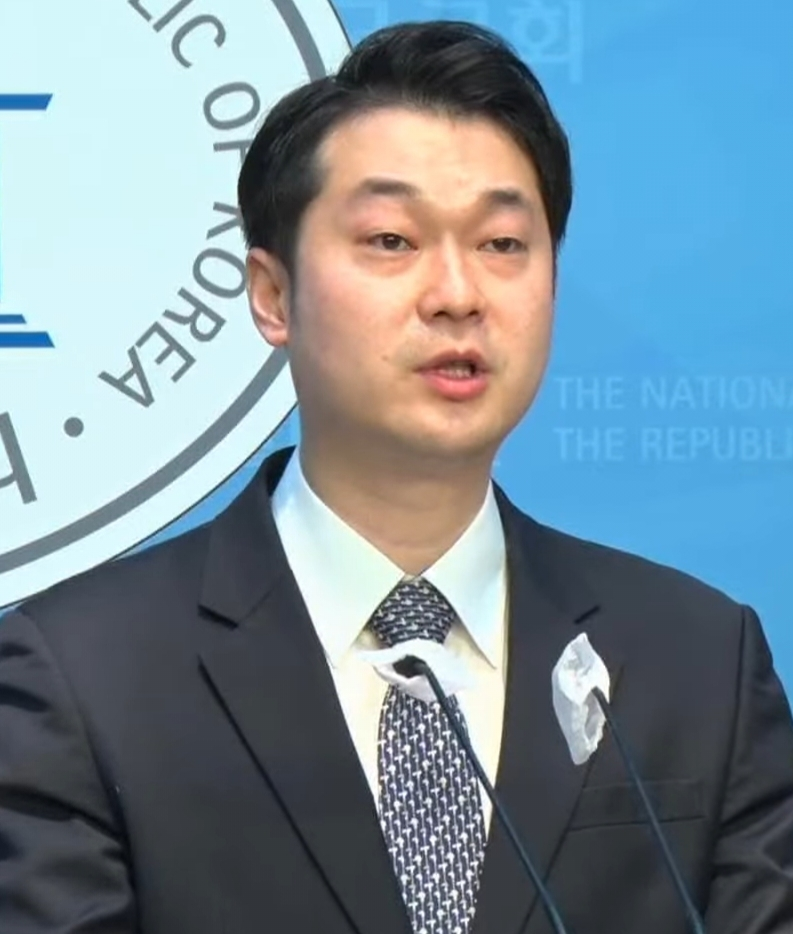

Member of the National Assembly of South Korea
- Incumbent
- Assumed office 2024

Personal details
- Born: 30 October 1987 (age 38) Haeundae District, Busan, South Korea
- Party: Democratic Party

Kim Dong-ah (Korean: 김동아; born 30 October 1987) is a South Korean politician from the Democratic Party who was elected to the National Assembly in Seodaemun A in the 2024 election.

== See also ==
- List of members of the National Assembly (South Korea), 2020–2024
