= Daejeon Metropolitan Council =

Daejeon Metropolitan Council 대전광역시의회
- 10th Daejeon Metropolitan Council

Type
- Type: Unicameral

History
- Founded: 8 July 1991

Leadership
- Chairman: Lee Sang-rae, People Power
- Vice Chairman: Kim Jin-oh, People Power
- Vice Chairman: Cho Won-hui, Democratic

Structure
- Seats: 22
- Political groups: Democratic (20) People Power (2)
- Length of term: 4 years

Elections
- Voting system: Parallel voting: First-past-the-post (19 seats); Party-list proportional representation (3 seats)
- Last election: 1 June 2022

Website
- Daejeon Metropolitan Council

- Daejeon Metropolitan Council
- Hangul: 대전광역시의회
- Hanja: 大田廣域市議會
- RR: Daejeon-gwangyeoksi uihoe
- MR: Taejŏn-gwangyŏksi ŭihoe

The Daejeon Metropolitan Council (Korean: 대전광역시의회) is the local council of Daejeon, South Korea.

There are a total of 22 members, with 19 members elected in the First-past-the-post voting system and 3 members elected in Party-list proportional representation.

== Current composition ==
| Political party | Seats |
|---|---|
| People Power | 2 |
| Democratic | 20 |
| Total | 22 |

Negotiation groups can be formed by 4 or more members. There are currently a negotiation group in the council, formed by the Democratic Party of Korea only.

== Organization ==
The structure of Council consists of:

- Chairman
- Two Vice-chairmen
- Standing Committees
  - Steering Committee
  - Administration and Autonomy Committee
  - Welfare and Environment Committee
  - Industry and Construction Committee
  - Education Committee
- Special Committees
  - Special Committees on Budget and Accounts
  - Special Committees on Ethics

== Recent election results ==
=== 2018 ===
Summary of the 13 June 2018 Daejeon Metropolitan Council election results
| Party | Constituency | | | | Party list | | | | Total seats | |
| Party | Votes | % | Seats | ± | Votes | % | Seats | ± | Seats | ± |
|---|---|---|---|---|---|---|---|---|---|---|
| Democratic Party of Korea | 442,612 | 64.17 | 19 | ▲5 | 384,083 | 55.21 | 2 | 0 | 21 | ▲5 |
| Liberty Korea Party | 211,871 | 30.72 | 0 | ▼5 | 183,819 | 26.42 | 1 | 0 | 1 | ▼5 |
| Bareunmirae Party | 33,486 | 4.86 | 0 | new | 61,971 | 8.90 | 0 | new | 0 | new |
| Justice Party | —N/a | | | | 54,292 | 7.80 | 1 | 0 | 0 | 0 |
| Green Party Korea | —N/a | | | | 4,509 | 0.64 | 0 | new | 0 | new |
| Minjung Party | 1,734 | 0.25 | 0 | new | 3,613 | 0.51 | 0 | new | 0 | new |
| Labor Party | —N/a | | | | 3,315 | 0.47 | 0 | new | 0 | new |
| Total | 689,703 | 100.00 | 19 | – | 695,602 | 100.00 | 3 | – | 22 | – |
