= Governor of Gangwon State =

Local leadership position of South Korea

- 강원특별자치도지사
- Seal of Gangwon

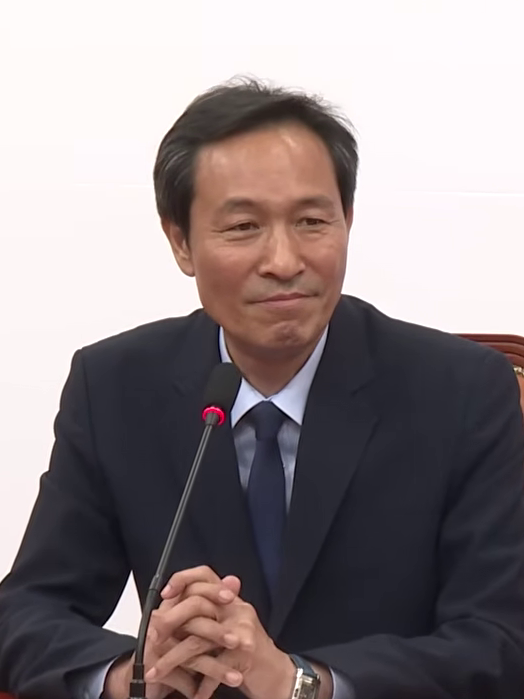
- Incumbent; Woo Sang-ho since 1 July 2026
- Term length: Four years
- Inaugural holder: Park Kun-won
- Formation: 19 January 1946; 80 years ago

The Governor of Gangwon State (Korean: 강원특별자치도지사; Hanja: 江原特別自治道知事) is the head of the local government of Gangwon State who is elected to a four-year term.

== List of governors ==
=== Appointed governors (before 1995) ===
From 1945 to 1995, the Governor of North Gyeongsang Province was appointed by the President of the Republic of Korea.

=== Directly elected governors (1995–present) ===
Since 1995, under provisions of the revised Local Government Act, the Governor of North Gyeongsang Province is elected by direct election.

Political parties
Conservative
Liberal
Independent
Status
Denotes acting governor

Term	Portrait	Name (Birth–Death)	Term of office			Political party	Elected
Term	Portrait	Name (Birth–Death)	Took office	Left office	Time in office	Political party	Elected
1st		Choi Gak-gyu 최각규 崔珏圭 (1933–2024)	1 July 1995	30 June 1998	3 years, 0 days	United Liberal Democrats → New Korea → Grand National	1995
2nd		Kim Jin-sun 김진선 金振兟 (born 1946)	1 July 1998	30 June 2010	12 years, 0 days	Grand National	1998
3rd		Kim Jin-sun 김진선 金振兟 (born 1946)	1 July 1998	30 June 2010	12 years, 0 days	Grand National	2002
4th		Kim Jin-sun 김진선 金振兟 (born 1946)	1 July 1998	30 June 2010	12 years, 0 days	Grand National	2006
5th		Kang Ki-chang 강기창 姜起敞 (born 1955); Acting	1 July 2010	2 September 2010	64 days	Independent	—
5th		Lee Kwang-jae 이광재 李光宰 (born 1965)	3 September 2010	27 January 2011	211 days	Democratic	2010
5th		Kang Ki-chang 강기창 姜起敞 (born 1955); Acting	28 January 2011	27 April 2011	90 days	Independent	—
5th		Choi Moon-soon 최문순 崔文洵 (born 1956)	28 April 2011	30 June 2022	11 years, 64 days	Democratic ('08) → Democratic United → Democratic ('11) → NPAD → Democratic ('14)	2011 (by-el.)
6th		Choi Moon-soon 최문순 崔文洵 (born 1956)	28 April 2011	30 June 2022	11 years, 64 days	Democratic ('08) → Democratic United → Democratic ('11) → NPAD → Democratic ('14)	2014
7th		Choi Moon-soon 최문순 崔文洵 (born 1956)	28 April 2011	30 June 2022	11 years, 64 days	Democratic ('08) → Democratic United → Democratic ('11) → NPAD → Democratic ('14)	2018
8th		Kim Jin-tae 김진태 金鎭台 (born 1964)	1 July 2022	30 June 2026	4 years, 0 days	People Power	2022
9th		Woo Sang-ho 우상호 禹相虎 (born 1962)	1 July 2026	Incumbent	69 days	Democratic	2026

== Elections ==
=== 1995 ===
1995 Gangwon gubernatorial election
Party	#	Candidate	Votes	Percentage
United Liberal Democrats	2	Choi Gak-gyu	500,894	65.82%
Democratic Liberal	1	Lee Sang-ryong	260,004	34.17%
Total			760,898	100.00%
Voter turnout			74.77%	

=== 1998 ===
1998 Gangwon gubernatorial election
Party	#	Candidate	Votes	Percentage
Grand National	1	Kim Jin-sun	268,559	39.27%
United Liberal Democrats	3	Han Ho-sun	231,376	33.84%
Independent	4	Lee Sang-ryong	183,775	26.87%
Total			683,710	100.00%
Voter turnout			64.27%	

=== 2002 ===
2002 Gangwon gubernatorial election
Party	#	Candidate	Votes	Percentage
Grand National	1	Kim Jin-sun	468,987	71.11%
Millennium Democratic	2	Nam Dong-woo	190,451	28.88%
Total			659,438	100.00%
Voter turnout			59.41%	

=== 2006 ===
2006 Gangwon gubernatorial election
Party	#	Candidate	Votes	Percentage
Grand National	2	Kim Jin-sun	471,613	70.56%
Uri	1	Lee Chang-bok	148,302	22.19%
Democratic	3	Yoo Jae-gyu	29,028	4.34%
People First	5	Yoo Seung-gyu	19,383	2.90%
Total			668,326	100.00%
Voter turnout			58.71%	

=== 2010 ===
2010 Gangwon gubernatorial election
Party	#	Candidate	Votes	Percentage
Democratic	2	Lee Kwang-jae	388,443	54.36%
Grand National	1	Lee Kye-jin	326,111	45.63%
Total			714,554	100.00%
Voter turnout			62.30%	

=== 2011 (by-election) ===
2011 Gangwon gubernatorial by-election
Party	#	Candidate	Votes	Percentage
Democratic	2	Choi Moon-soon	293,509	51.08%
Grand National	1	Ohm Ki-young	267,538	46.56%
Independent	8	Hwang Hak-su	13,463	2.34%
Total			574,510	100.00%
Voter turnout			47.50%	

=== 2014 ===
2014 Gangwon gubernatorial election
Party	#	Candidate	Votes	Percentage
NPAD	2	Choi Moon-soon	381,338	49.76%
Saenuri	1	Choi Heung-jip	369,201	48.17%
Unified Progressive	3	Lee Seung-jae	15,774	2.05%
Total			766,313	100.00%
Voter turnout			62.24%	

=== 2018 ===
2018 Gangwon gubernatorial election
Party	#	Candidate	Votes	Percentage
Democratic	1	Choi Moon-soon	518,447	64.73%
Liberty Korea	2	Jeong Chang-soo	282,456	35.26%
Total			800,903	100.00%
Voter turnout			63.20%	

=== 2022 ===
2022 Gangwon gubernatorial election
Party	#	Candidate	Votes	Percentage
People Power	2	Kim Jin-tae	409,461	54.07%
Democratic	1	Lee Kwang-jae	347,766	45.92%
Total			757,227	100.00%
Voter turnout			57.82%	

=== 2026 ===
Candidate	Party	Votes	%
Woo Sang-ho	Democratic Party	437,583	51.81
Kim Jin-tae (incumbent)	People Power Party	406,950	48.19
Total		844,533	100.00
Valid votes		844,533	98.40
Invalid/blank votes		13,737	1.60
Total votes		858,270	100.00
Registered voters/turnout		1,329,742	64.54
Democratic gain from People Power			

== See also ==
- Government of South Korea
- Politics of South Korea
