= Pyeongchang-eup =

- Town
- Panoramic view of Pyeongchang-eup

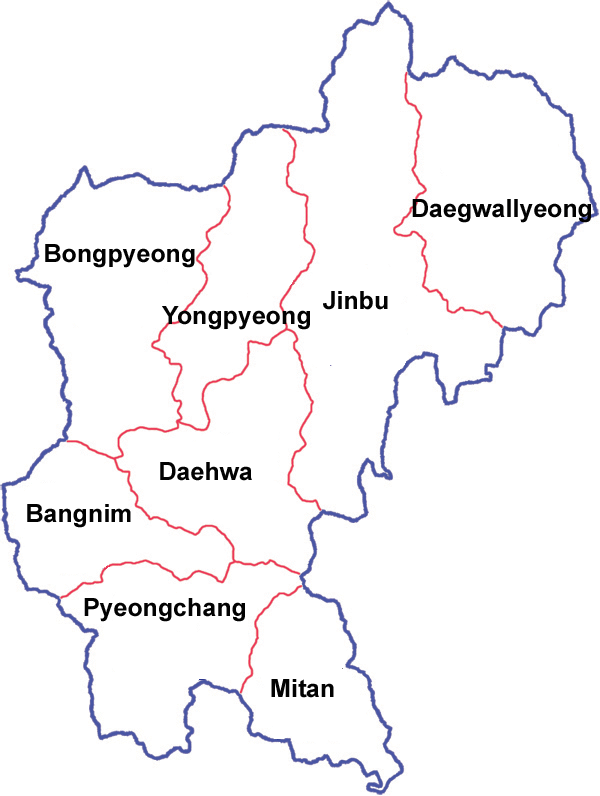
- Map of the County of Pyeongchang

- Location of Pyeongchang-eup in South Korea
- Coordinates: 37°22′3″N 128°23′45″E
- Country: South Korea
- Province: Gangwon
- County: Pyeongchang
- Administrative divisions: 36 ri

Area
  - Total: 116.31 km^{2} (44.91 sq mi)
- Elevation: 295 m (968 ft)

Population (2008)
  - Total: 9,940
  - Density: 85.5/km^{2} (221/sq mi)
- Time zone: UTC+9 (Korea Standard Time)

Korean name
- Hangul: 평창읍
- Hanja: 平昌邑
- RR: Pyeongchang-eup
- MR: P'yŏngch'ang-ŭp

Pyeongchang-eup (Korean: 평창읍) is a town in South Korea and the county seat of the county of Pyeongchang. The town has a surface area of 116.31 km^{2} (44.91 sq mi) and a population of 9,940. It is located on the left bank of the river Pyeongchanggang.

== Economy ==
Its local activities include the production of tobacco, silk, and honey. It is also a tourist resort due to its location in an area popular with mountaineering and skiing activities.

== Sport ==
The county of Pyeongchang is the host city of the 2018 Winter Olympics and Paralympics. However, none of the events were held in the actual city of Pyeongchang-eup.
