= Venues of the 2018 Winter Olympics and Paralympics =

Map of 2018 Olympic venues

The compactness of the venue locations for the 2018 Winter Olympics and 2018 Winter Paralympics, hosted by the county of Pyeongchang, South Korea was one of the winning arguments of the bid. The Games were gathered around two main venues: these were the mountain resort of Alpensia in Pyeongchang for the outdoor (snow) sports (Nordic and alpine skiing, bobsleigh, etc.) and the coastal city of Gangneung for the indoor (ice) sports (figure skating, ice hockey, etc.) There were also two stand-alone mountain venues.

The Games had a total of 13 competition venues, six of which were constructed especially for the Games. The last venue to start being constructed was the long track speed skating oval in Gangneung; work began on this in October 2014.

Some of these venues were used for the 2024 Winter Youth Olympics, held in Gangwon.

== Pyeongchang Mountain Cluster ==
=== Alpensia Sports Park ===
The Alpensia Resort in Daegwallyeong-myeon, Pyeongchang, was the main focus of the 2018 Pyeongchang Winter Olympics.

- Pyeongchang Olympic Stadium – Opening and closing ceremonies
- Alpensia Ski Jumping Centre – Ski jumping, Nordic combined, snowboarding (big air)
- Alpensia Biathlon Centre – Biathlon
- Alpensia Cross-Country Centre – Cross-country skiing, Nordic combined
- Alpensia Sliding Centre – Luge, bobsleigh, skeleton
- Yongpyong Alpine Centre – Alpine skiing (slalom, giant slalom)
- Pyeongchang Olympic Village

=== Stand-alone venues ===
- Phoenix Snow Park in Bongpyeong-myeon, Pyeongchang – Freestyle skiing, snowboarding
- Jeongseon Alpine Centre in Pyeongchang's neighboring county of Jeongseon – Alpine skiing (downhill, super-G, combined)

== Gangneung Coastal Cluster ==
The coastal cluster is located in Pyeongchang's neighboring city of Gangneung. The Gangneung Olympic Park included the following four venues:

- Gangneung Hockey Centre – Ice hockey (men´s tournament)
- Gangneung Curling Centre – Curling
- Gangneung Oval – Long track speed skating
- Gangneung Ice Arena – Short track speed skating, figure skating

Additionally, a stand-alone venue was located in the grounds of Catholic Kwandong University:

- Kwandong Hockey Centre - Ice hockey (women´s tournament)
