= Office of the President of the Republic of Korea =

South Korean presidential secretariat

- 대한민국 대통령비서실

Agency overview
- Formed: 23 March 2013; 13 years ago
- Jurisdiction: Government of South Korea
- Headquarters: Cheong Wa Dae, Seoul
- Employees: 443
- Chief Presidential Secretary responsible: Lim Gwang-hyeon, Chief of Staff to the President of the Republic of Korea
- Chief Presidential Secretary for Policy responsible: Ha Joon-kyung, Director of Policy Office
- Parent agency: President of South Korea
- Website: Official website

Korean name
- Hangul: 대통령비서실
- Hanja: 大統領秘書室
- RR: Daetongnyeong biseosil
- MR: Taet'ongnyŏng pisŏsil

The Office of the President of the Republic of Korea (Korean: 대통령비서실) assists the President of South Korea. The Chief of Staff to the President is the head of the Office of the President and is a ministerial-level official.

Cheong Wa Dae, or the Blue House, was often used as a metonym for the Presidential Secretariat due to its office being located there. This continued until President Yoon Suk Yeol moved the office and residency of the President out of the Blue House in May 2022, placing it instead at the Ministry of National Defense Building in Yongsan. Later, President Lee Jae-myung returned its office and residency back to Blue House in December 2025. The Presidential Secretariat is an important part of the executive branch of the South Korean government.

== Members ==
=== Lee Jae Myung Administration ===
Under the Lee Jae-myung administration, the Presidential Secretariat is made up of the Chief Presidential Secretary, Chief Presidential Secretary for Policy, three Advisors to the President and seven senior presidential secretaries.

==== Senior Presidential Secretary for Political Affairs (정무수석비서관) ====
| Number | Name | Took office | Left office |
|---|---|---|---|
| 1 | Woo Sang-ho | 8 June 2025 | |

==== Senior Presidential Secretary for Civil Society (경청통합수석비서관) ====
previously Senior Presidential Secretary for Civil Society (시민사회수석비서관)

| Number | Name | Took office | Left office |
|---|---|---|---|
| 1 | Cheon Sung Hwan | 29 June 2025 | |

==== Senior Presidential Secretary for Public Relations (홍보수석비서관) ====
| Number | Name | Took office | Left office |
|---|---|---|---|
| 1 | Lee Kyu Yeon | 8 June 2025 | |

==== Senior Presidential Secretary for Economic Affairs and Development (경제성장수석비서관) ====
previously Senior Presidential Secretary for Economic Affairs (경제수석비서관)

| Number | Name | Took office | Left office |
|---|---|---|---|
| 1 | Ha Jun Kyung | 6 June 2025 | |

==== Senior Presidential Secretary for Social Affairs (사회수석비서관) ====
| Number | Name | Took office | Left office |
|---|---|---|---|
| 1 | Moon Jin Young | 6 June 2025 | |

==== Senior Presidential Secretary for Civil Affairs (민정수석비서관) ====
| Number | Name | Took office | Left office |
|---|---|---|---|
| 1 | Oh Kwang-soo (politician) | 8 June 2025 | 13 June 2025 |
| 2 | Bong Wook | 29 June 2025 | |

==== Senior Presidential Secretary for AI Future Planning (AI미래기획수석비서관) ====
| Number | Name | Took office | Left office |
|---|---|---|---|
| 1 | Ha Jung-woo | June 15 2025 | |

=== Yoon Suk Yeol Administration ===
President Yoon almost halved the size of his secretariat following his campaign promise to give more authority to ministers. Chief Presidential Secretary for Policy as well as advisors to the presidents have been abolished.

==== Senior Presidential Secretary for Political Affairs (정무수석비서관) ====
| Number | Name | Took office | Left office |
|---|---|---|---|
| 1 | Lee Jin-Bok (이진복) | 10 May 2022 | 3 December 2023 |
| 2 | Han Oh-seop (한오섭) | 4 December 2023 | Incumbent |

==== Senior Presidential Secretary for Civil Society (시민사회수석비서관) ====
| Number | Name | Took office | Left office |
|---|---|---|---|
| 1 | Kang Seng-Kyu (강승규) | 10 May 2022 | 3 December 2023 |
| 2 | Hwang Sang-moo (황상무) | 4 December 2023 | 20 March 2024 |
| 3 | Vacancy | - | - |

==== Senior Presidential Secretary for Public Relations (홍보수석비서관) ====
| Number | Name | Took office | Left office |
|---|---|---|---|
| 1 | Choi Yeong-beom (최영범) | 10 May 2022 | 21 August 2022 |
| 2 | Kim Eun-hye (김은혜) | 22 August 2022 | 3 December 2023 |
| 3 | Lee Do-woon (이도운) | 4 December 2023 | Incumbent |

==== Senior Presidential Secretary for Economic Affairs (경제수석비서관) ====
| Number | Name | Took office | Left office |
|---|---|---|---|
| 1 | Choi Sang-mok (최상목) | 10 May 2022 | 3 December 2023 |
| 2 | Park Chun-seop (박춘섭) | 4 December 2023 | Incumbent |

==== Senior Presidential Secretary for Social Affairs (사회수석비서관) ====
| Number | Name | Took office | Left office |
|---|---|---|---|
| 1 | Ahn Sang-Hoon (안상훈) | 10 May 2022 | 3 December 2023 |
| 2 | Jang Sang-yun (장상윤) | 4 December 2023 | Incumbent |

=== Moon Jae-in Administration ===
Under the Moon Jae-in administration, the Presidential Secretariat is made up of the Chief Presidential Secretary, Chief Presidential Secretary for Policy, two Advisors to the President and eight senior presidential secretaries as well as over 400 other public servants. There are also four unpaid Special Advisors to the President.

The Chief Presidential Secretary is accompanied by the first five senior presidential secretaries listed below whereas Chief Presidential Secretary for Policy is accompanied by the remaining three.

Senior Presidential Secretary for Political Affairs (정무수석비서관)

| Number | Name | Took office | Left office |
|---|---|---|---|
| 1 | Jun Byung-hun (전병헌) | 14 May 2017 | 19 November 2017 |
| 2 | Han Byung-do (한병도) | 28 November 2017 | 8 January 2019 |
| 3 | Kang Gi-jung (강기정) | 9 January 2019 | 10 August 2020 |
| 4 | Choi Jae-sung (최재성) | 11 August 2020 | 16 April 2021 |
| 5 | Lee Chul-hee (이철희) | 16 April 2021 | 9 May 2022 |

Senior Presidential Secretary for Civil Affairs (민정수석비서관)

| Number | Name | Took office | Left office |
|---|---|---|---|
| 1 | Cho Kuk (조국) | 11 May 2017 | 26 July 2019 |
| 2 | Kim Jo-won (김조원) | 26 July 2019 | 10 August 2020 |
| 3 | Kim Jong-ho (김종호) | 11 August 2020 | 31 December 2020 |
| 4 | Shin Hyun-soo (신현수) | 1 January 2021 | 4 March 2021 |
| 5 | Kim Jin-Guk (김진국) | 4 March 2021 | 21 December 2021 |
| 6 | Kim Young-Sik (김영식) | 17 January 2022 | 9 May 2022 |

Senior Presidential Secretary for Civil Society (시민사회수석비서관)
previously Senior Presidential Secretary for Social Innovation (사회혁신수석비서관)

| Number | Name | Took office | Left office |
|---|---|---|---|
| 1 | Ha Seung-chang (하승창) | 14 May 2017 | 26 June 2018 |
| 2 | Lee Yong-sun (이용선) | 27 June 2018 | 26 July 2019 |
| 3 | Kim Keo-sung (김거성) | 26 July 2019 | 10 August 2020 |
| 4 | Kim Je-nam (김재남) | 11 August 2020 | 28 May 2021 |
| 5 | Bang Jung-kyun (방정균) | 28 May 2021 | 9 May 2022 |

Senior Presidential Secretary for Public Affairs (국민소통수석비서관)

| Number | Name | Took office | Left office |
|---|---|---|---|
| 1 | Yoon Young-chan (윤영찬) | 11 May 2017 | 8 January 2019 |
| 2 | Yoon Do-han (윤도한) | 9 January 2019 | 12 August 2020 |
| 3 | Jang Man-ho (장만호) | 13 August 2020 | 9 May 2022 |

Senior Presidential Secretary for Personnel Management (인사수석비서관)

| Number | Name | Took office | Left office |
|---|---|---|---|
| 1 | Cho Hyun-ok (조현옥) | 11 May 2017 | 28 May 2019 |
| 2 | Kim Oe-sook (김외숙) | 28 May 2019 | 9 May 2022 |

Senior Presidential Secretary for Job Creation (일자리수석비서관)

| Number | Name | Took office | Left office |
|---|---|---|---|
| 1 | Bahn Jahng-shick (반장식) | 3 July 2017 | 26 June 2018 |
| 2 | Jung Tae-ho (정태호) | 27 June 2018 | 26 July 2019 |
| 3 | Hwang Duk-soon (황덕순) | 26 July 2019 | 31 October 2020 |
| 4 | Im Seo-jeong (임서정) | 1 November 2020 | 9 May 2022 |

Senior Presidential Secretary for Economic Affairs (경제수석비서관)

| Number | Name | Took office | Left office |
|---|---|---|---|
| 1 | Hong Jang-pyo (홍장표) | 3 July 2017 | 26 June 2018 |
| 2 | Yoon Jong-won (윤종원) | 27 June 2018 | 21 June 2019 |
| 3 | Lee Ho-seung (이호승) | 21 June 2019 | 9 May 2022 |

Senior Presidential Secretary for Social Affairs (사회수석비서관)

| Number | Name | Took office | Left office |
|---|---|---|---|
| 1 | Kim Su-hyun (김수현) | 14 May 2017 | 9 November 2018 |
| 2 | Kim Yun-myung (김연명) | 9 November 2018 | 12 August 2020 |
| 3 | Yoon Chang-ryeol (윤창렬) | 12 August 2020 | 9 May 2022 |

Advisor to the President for Science and Technology (과학기술보좌관)

| Number | Name | Took office | Left office |
|---|---|---|---|
| 1 | Mun Mi-ock (문미옥) | 20 June 2017 | 14 December 2018 |
| 2 | Lee Kong-joo (이공주) | 19 February 2019 | 19 February 2020 |
| 3 | Park Su-kyung (박수경) | 4 May 2020 | 9 May 2022 |

Advisor to the President for Economic Affairs (경제보좌관)

| Number | Name | Took office | Left office |
|---|---|---|---|
| 1 | Kim Hyun-cheol (김현철) | 6 June 2017 | 29 January 2018 |
| 2 | Choo Hyung-cheol (주형철) | 18 March 2018 | 6 January 2020 |
| 3 | Park Bok-yeong (박복영) | 9 March 2020 | 9 May 2022 |

Special Advisors to the President (특별보좌관)

| Area | Name | Took office | Left office |
|---|---|---|---|
| Foreign Affairs, Diplomacy and National Security and President's Special Envoy to UAE | Im Jong-seok (임종석) | 21 January 2019 | 19 June 2022 |
| Foreign Affairs, Diplomacy and National Security | Kim Hyun-jong (김현종) | 20 January 2021 | 9 May 2022 |
| Foreign Affairs (and President's Special Envoy to Iraq) | Han Byung-do (한병도) | 21 January 2019 | 19 June 2022 |
| Economy and Science | Lee Jung-dong (이정동) | 23 January 2019 | 9 May 2022 |

Special Presidential Envoy (특별사절)

| Area | Name | Took office | Left office |
|---|---|---|---|
| Special Presidential Envoy for Future Generations and Culture | BTS (방탄소년단) | 21 July 2021 | Incumbent |

== See also ==
- Chief of Staff to the President (South Korea)
- Chief Presidential Secretary for Policy
- Senior Presidential Secretary
- President of South Korea
- Cabinet of South Korea
