= Cabinet of Lee Myung-bak =

Government of South Korea from 2008 to 2013

- State Council of South Korea
- 2008–2013
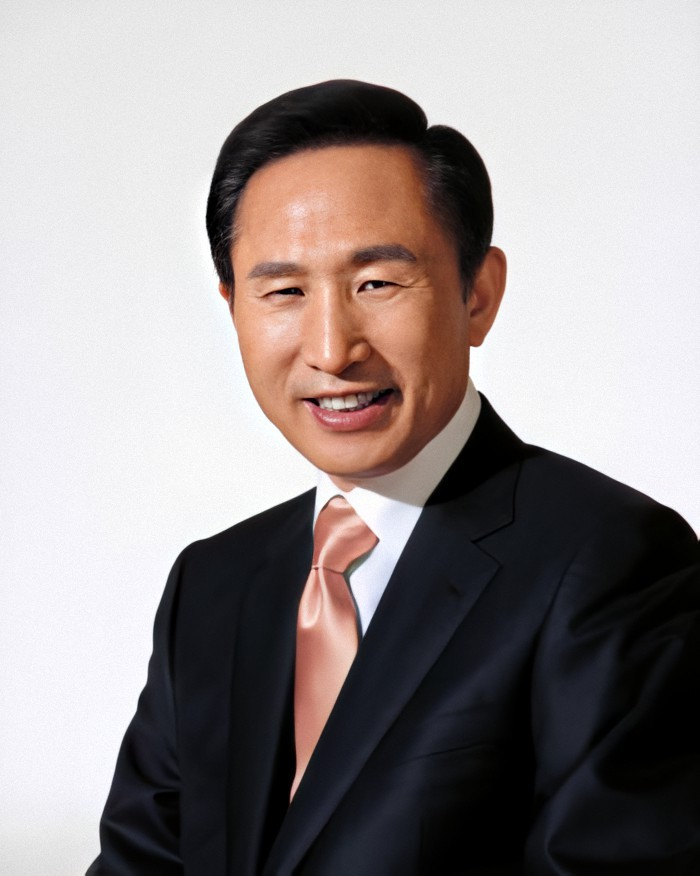
- Date formed: 25 February 2008
- Date dissolved: 24 February 2013

People and organisations
- President: Lee Myung-bak
- Prime Minister: Han Seung-soo; Chung Un-chan; Yoon Jeung-hyun (acting); Kim Hwang-sik
- Member party: Saenuri Party
- Status in legislature: Majority government

History
- Elections: 2007 presidential election; 2008 legislative election; 2012 legislative election
- Predecessor: Cabinet of Roh Moo-hyun
- Successor: Cabinet of Park Geun-hye

The Cabinet of Lee Myung-bak (Korean: 이명박 정부; RR: Myeong-bak Jeongbu) was the fifth government of the Sixth Republic of South Korea. It took office on 25 February 2008 after Lee Myung-bak's victory in the 2007 presidential elections. Most of the new cabinet was approved by the National Assembly on 29 February. Led by President Lee Myung-bak, it was supported principally by the conservative Saenuri Party, previously known as the Grand National Party. It was also known as Silyong Jeongbu (Korean: 실용정부; Hanja: 實用政府), the "pragmatic government", a name deriving from Lee's campaign slogan.

A provisional committee established shortly before the government's inauguration presented proposals with the intention of creating a more compact government. The main objective of the administration was cited in 2011 as "the foundation of micro-government and macro-market ideas to revive the economy". Politically, the administration was marked by an ongoing internal dispute between the factions of Lee and Park Geun-hye within the ruling party after an intense contest between the two in the primaries preceding the 2007 elections. The government presided over issues such as the South Korea foot-and-mouth outbreak, the ratification of the United States–Korea Free Trade Agreement, the 2011 South Korean university tuition crisis and the Jeju-do Naval Base.

The Lee Myung-bak government ended on 25 February 2013 with the inauguration of Park Geun-hye as president.

== Cabinet ==
Office	Incumbent	In office	Party
President	Lee Myung-bak	25 February 2008 –	Grand National / Saenuri
Prime Minister	Han Seung-soo	29 February 2008 – 28 September 2008	Grand National
Prime Minister	Chung Un-chan	29 September 2009 – 11 August 2010	Independent
Prime Minister	Yoon Jeung-hyun (acting)	11 August 2010 – 1 October 2010	Independent
Prime Minister	Kim Hwang-sik	1 October 2010 –	Independent
Minister for Strategy and Finance	Kang Man-soo	29 February 2008 – 9 February 2009	Grand National
Minister for Strategy and Finance	Yun Jeung-hyeon	10 February 2009 – 31 May 2011	Independent
Minister for Strategy and Finance	Park Se-wan	1 June 2011 –	Grand National / Saenuri
Minister for Education, Science and Technology	Kim Do-yeon	29 February 2008 – 5 August 2008	Independent
Minister for Education, Science and Technology	Byong Man Ahn	6 August 2008 – 2010	Independent
Minister for Education, Science and Technology	Lee Ju-ho	2010 –	Grand National / Saenuri
Minister for Foreign Affairs and Trade	Yu Myung-hwan	29 February 2008 – 4 September 2010	Independent
Minister for Foreign Affairs and Trade	Sin Gak-su (acting)	5 September 2010 – 7 October 2010	Independent
Minister for Foreign Affairs and Trade	Kim Sung-hwan	8 October 2010 –	Independent
Minister for Unification	Kim Ha-jung	11 March 2008 – 11 February 2009	Independent
Minister for Unification	Hyun In-taek	12 February 2009 – 30 August 2011	Independent
Minister for Unification	Yu Woo-ik	30 August 2011 –	Independent
Minister for Justice	Kim Kyung-han	29 February 2008 – 29 September 2009	Independent
Minister for Justice	Lee Kwi-nam	30 September 2009 – 10 August 2011	Independent
Minister for Justice	Kwon Jae-jin	11 August 2011 –	Independent
Minister for National Defense	Lee Sang-hee	29 February 2008 – 22 September 2009	Independent
Minister for National Defense	Kim Tae-young	23 September 2009 – 3 December 2011	Independent
Minister for National Defense	Kim Kwan-jin	4 December 2011 –	Independent
Minister for Public Administration and Security	Won Sei-hoon	29 February 2008 – 11 February 2009	Independent
Minister for Public Administration and Security	Lee Dal-gon	20 February 2009 – 4 March 2010	Grand National
Minister for Public Administration and Security	Maeng Hyung-kyu	15 April 2010 –	Grand National / Saenuri
Minister for Culture, Sports and Tourism	Yu In-chon	29 February 2008 – 26 January 2011	Independent
Minister for Culture, Sports and Tourism	Jeong Byeong-guk	27 January 2011 – 19 September 2011	Grand National
Minister for Culture, Sports and Tourism	Choe Kwang-shik	20 September 2011 –	Independent
Minister for Food, Agriculture, Forestry and Fisheries	Chung Woon-chun	29 February 2008 – 6 August 2008	Grand National
Minister for Food, Agriculture, Forestry and Fisheries	Chang Tae-pyung	6 August 2008 – 30 August 2010	Independent
Minister for Food, Agriculture, Forestry and Fisheries	Yoo Jeong-bok	30 August 2010 – 1 June 2011	Grand National
Minister for Food, Agriculture, Forestry and Fisheries	Suh Kyu-yong	2 June 2011 –	Grand National / Saenuri
Minister for Knowledge Economy	Lee Youn-ho	29 February 2008 – 18 September 2009	Independent
Minister for Knowledge Economy	Choi Kyung-hwan	19 September 2009 – 26 January 2011	Independent
Minister for Knowledge Economy	Choi Joong-kyung	27 January 2011 – November 2011	Independent
Minister for Knowledge Economy	Hong Seok-woo	November 2011 –	Independent
Minister for Health, Welfare and Family Affairs	Kim Soung-yee	13 March 2008 – 6 August 2008	Independent
Minister for Health, Welfare and Family Affairs	Jun Jae-hee	6 August 2008 – 19 March 2010	Grand National
Minister for Health and Welfare	Jun Jae-hee	19 March 2010 – 25 August 2010	Grand National
Minister for Health and Welfare	Chin Soo-hee	30 August 2010 – 15 September 2011	Grand National
Minister for Health and Welfare	Im Chae-min	16 September 2011 –	Independent
Minister for Environment	Lee Maan-ee	12 March 2008 –	Independent
Minister for Labor	Lee Young-hee	29 February 2008 – 30 September 2009	Independent
Minister for Labor	Yim Tae-hee	1 October 2009 – 5 July 2010	Grand National
Minister for Employment and Labor	Yim Tae-hee	5 July 2010 – 29 August 2010	Grand National
Minister for Employment and Labor	Bahk Jae-wan	30 August 2010 –	Grand National / Saenuri
Minister for Gender Equality	Byun Do-yoon	13 March 2008 – 29 September 2009	Independent
Minister for Gender Equality	Paik Hee-young	30 September 2009 – 18 March 2010	Independent
Minister for Gender Equality and Family	Paik Hee-young	19 March 2010 – 15 September 2011	Independent
Minister for Gender Equality and Family	Kim Geum-rae	16 September 2011 –	Grand National / Saenuri
Minister for Land, Transport and Maritime Affairs	Chung Jong-hwan	29 February 2008 – 1 June 2011	Independent
Minister for Land, Transport and Maritime Affairs	Kwon Do-yeop	2 June 2011 –	Independent
Minister for Special Affairs	Joo Ho-young	13 October 2009 – 29 August 2010	Grand National
Minister for Special Affairs	Yi Jae-oh	30 August 2010 –	Grand National / Saenuri

== Economics ==
The government's macroeconomic policy was known as Mbnomics, named after Lee Myung-bak.

=== Housing ===
The government plan to resolve the mortgage crisis was through projects to construct more residential areas. Between 2009 and 2010, the government built 311,000 new apartments, which resulted in limiting annual housing price increases to just 1.2-1.7%. Criticis charged that the plan could lead to huge deficits. As of late 2011, half of the new units were designated to be sold, rather than rented.

Critics alleged that GNP catered to big business, did not fix the unemployment crisis, and allowed income inequality to increase.

=== Incomes ===
As of 2011 the average income of South Koreans had decreased.

=== Unemployment ===
Critics alleged that the government manipulated statistics to make unemployment appear lower to the public. The Korea Development Institute released a statement on October 27, 2011 that the potential unemployment rate of this time by using the survey method of the International Labour Organization was 21.2% rather than the government's 4.8%.

=== Inflation and price controls ===
According to the MB Consumers' Price Rate (Korean:MB물가지수) prices increased by 23% on average from 2008 to 2011.

In 2012, a policy to limit inflation was set in motion. It was enacted by after previous attempts by the Korean food agency only led to wild price changes. Baek-il, professor of Commercial Distribution Studies at Ulsan College, criticized President Lee's proposal of price controls as "interfering the supply and demandchains" and "unless the government gives subsidiary funds, it is impossible to control the prices".

=== Trade ===
==== Free Trade Agreement ====
The government-affiliated GNP ratified the South Korea–United States Free Trade Agreement bill in the National Assembly on 22 November 2011. GNP floor leader Hwang Woo-yeo had decided to ratify it 2 days earlier due to a noticeable deadlock from the disagreements of opponents. During the vote, the National Assembly was intentionally sealed off from the public and the media by Park Hee-tae, a GNP-affiliated Speaker of the National Assembly. Deputy Speaker Chung Ui-hwa said that the reasons for securing the National Assembly were to prevent uproar from the opponents and to prevent international media portraying the Assembly as a laughing stock.

Nam Kyung-pil, Foreign Affairs, Trade and Unification Committee chairman and a GNP member, resigned as his party failed to reach consensus by breaking parliamentary protocols.

The Korean Peasants League labeled the GNP as "a group of traitors" for its support of the Free Trade Agreement.

Some GNP officials suggested reducing police actions against demonstrations and abstaining from drinking in public due to the unexpected protests.

==== U.A.E. Nuclear deal ====
In 2009, a South Korean consortium won one of the largest ever construction deals for nuclear reactors in the U.A.E. worth US$40 billion. President Lee personally phoned and visited high ranking U.A.E. officials. South Korea beat out French and American competitors.

==== Iraqi oil deal ====
A leaked diplomatic cable showed that a South Korean Foreign Minister official felt that Lee intervened "prematurely" during the 2009 Iraq-South Korea Summit in Seoul, the Iraqi oil deal for South Korea. Fellow GNP member, Lee Hak-jae (Korean: 이학재; Hanja: 李鶴宰) criticized Lee's role in the failure of Korea National Oil Corporation's plan to inspect oil reserves in Iraqi Kurdistan.

==== Arms exports ====
The Lee government emphasized the growth of the South Korean arms industry. The industry revealed plans to increase arms exports to US$4 billion yearly by 2020, making it the world's 7th largest exporter. In 2010 and 2011, South Korea exported trainer jets and submarines to Indonesia.

== Media issues ==
=== Telecommunications/Internet ===
46 packet-tapping devices were acquired as tools for domestic Internet surveillance by the administration. Many of these devices are operated under the National Intelligence Service.

The GNP once tried to reform telecommunication services, but abandoned the effort due to its potential for Internet censorship.

=== Media rep bill ===
On January, 5th, 2012, the parliamentary-level Committee on Culture, Sports, Tourism, Broadcasting & Communications passed the Media Rep Bill (미디어렙법), intended to regulate direct dealings between networks and advertisers. The official goal was to prevent advertisers from pressuring networks to bias their content and also reduce the practice of selective advertisement, thus increasing fairness and preventing major newspapers from monopolization. However, critics claimed that an advertising broker bill could potentially over-monopolize the domestic advertising.

=== Journalist strike ===
Journalists on notable South Korean media outlets such as KBS, MBC and YTN engaged in strikes in early 2012, protesting government interference in news content.

The International Federation of Journalists condemned changes in the management of major broadcast media in South Korea that it claimed were political interference. The Lee government was accused of appointing his supporters to executive positions at state-run broadcasting and some key public enterprises.

The government was accused of appointing Lee's close associates to presidencies of SKY LIFE satellite broadcasting and YTN, both of which supported his campaign as well as Korea Broadcasting Advertising Corporation and the English broadcasting company, Arirang TV.

=== 2008 beef protests ===
In 2008 the Munhwa Broadcasting Corporation underwent court investigation over a program dealing with a beef deal with the United States which the IFJ local affiliate, the Journalists' Association of Korea (JAK) says violated press freedom and breached the promise protecting journalists. The program, known as 'PD Diary', was accused of deliberately distorting 19 parts of the program, including several deliberate mistranslations, which the Lee administration claimed were partially responsible for sparking protests. The translator, Ji-Min Jung, disclosed that the producers had intentionally distorted the original translation and the prosecutor's investigation result confirmed the actions on 31 July.

Norma Kang Muico, Amnesty International's Korea researcher, said (in 2009), "We are extremely concerned that the human rights situation in South Korea has deteriorated since last year." As an example, she mentioned the prosecution's indictment of the PD Diary affair. She concluded, "The freedom of the press in Korea is now facing a challenge."

According to WikiLeaks documents, top officials of Lee's administration had agreed with then American ambassador, Alexander Vershbow, on 17 January 2008 to open up Korea's beef market, months before Lee's trip to the US in April 2008.

== Controversies ==
=== Management of dissent/protests ===
Under the Lee Myung-bak administration, police reportedly moved to restrict assemblies and demonstrations depending on their purposes as well as imposing fines on people who refuse on-the-street demands to present identification. Lee was called authoritarian, and anti-labor. Yoon Yeo-jun, a former GNP member, openly claimed that Lee ignored democratic protocols at a public seminar in September 2011.

Amnesty International accused Lee of ordering South Korean police to use excessive force against peaceful protestors. In an interview with Time magazine, President Lee commented, "I fully understand the protesters' point of view on the matter" and regarding the long-lasting demonstration, he added, "Protesting culture has a deep-root in democracy of Korea and despite the ongoing political upheaval of this country, the enthusiasm that the protesters showed is one side of the dynamism we embrace and this will eventually be a positive drive of Korea's development".

Lee's government was criticized for maintaining surveillance illegally on Kim Jong-ik. Lee ordered a swift investigation into the case and punishment for anyone found guilty.

Former minister of the Ministry of Environment, Yoon Yeo-jun, criticized President Lee for valuing efficiency and productivity over democratic processes.

=== Allegations of religious bias ===
The government received criticism from the Buddhist establishment over its plan to complete the Wonhyo Pilgrimage Trail in 2015. Construction had started in January 2009 but was arbitrarily stopped in July 2010.

Some Buddhists protested Lee's support for Christianity. When Lee was mayor of Seoul, he declared the city "a holy place governed by God" and the citizens of Seoul "God's people." Lee reportedly received 80% of Korea's Christian votes.

In August 2008, Buddhist monks protested against Lee's pro-Christian politics. Buddhist groups, including the influential Jogye order, accused the government of discriminating against Buddhism. On 9 September, the Buddhist community accepted President Lee's expression of regret over the perceived bias and personal pledge to ensure the government's neutrality.

The government's decision to reduce the funding for Temple Stay programs across South Korean Buddhist temples generated mistrust from Buddhist establishments.

On 3 March 2011, Lee and the first lady attended a national-level Christian gathering in COEX Convention & Exhibition Center and kneeled during prayer time. Both ruling and opposition parties later criticized his actions for undermining the separation of church and state. Kyunghyang Shinmun Political-International section editor Kim Bong-seon criticized Lee's actions by recommending Lee "to choose only one position between an elder position of a Christian church and a presidential position of South Korea". This incident had also sparked negative reactions from non-Christian organizations. The Korean Buddhist Youth Association (대한불교청년회) protested Lee's actions and recommended that he "manage his dignity". Minister In Myeong-jin of the Galili Church in Guro District, Seoul criticized certain aggressive Christian groups, and noted that due to the controversy "the next president should never be a Protestant Christian".

=== University tuition policy ===
Student demonstrations protested tuition changes with demonstrations such as "hair-cutting protests". The Democratic Party criticized the policy. Hwang Woo-yeo, floor leader of the GNP, urged President Lee to reform tuition policy even though whether the half-tuition proposal was an actual promise was disputed.

=== Selling information on South Korean citizens ===
A 19 September 2011 MBC News report reported that the Ministry of Public Administration and Security had been selling Resident registration numbers, names and addresses of South Korean citizens to private bond firms and other private institutions for the prior 3 years. The report was confirmed by Democratic Party member, Jeong Se-hwan. The average price per ID was 3 cents.

After the news, the sale of personal information by government agencies was outlawed.

=== Draft-dodging ===
The Lee government's anti-North Korean stance led to increased military spending for South Korea. Democratic Party member, Ahn Gyu-baek claimed that there had been a twofold increase in draft-dodging during the Lee administration according to data provided by the Military Manpower Administration.

=== Alleged corruption and malpractices among prosecutors ===
The Supreme Prosecutors' Office of the Republic of Korea (SPO) was alleged to be biased towards the government and domestic right wing scenes. The future Prosecutor General of the SPO, Han Sang-dae, among others, was criticized for falsely registering his address. The SPO lost consecutive cases concerning Han Myeong-sook for bribery charges when the Seoul High Court found her innocent.

In 2011, SPO canceled the conviction of the former tax inspector of the National Tax Service, Kim Dong-il (Korean: 김동일; Hanja: 金東一), who criticized then Commissioner Han Sang-ryul for causing Roh Mu-hyun's suicide and later stated, "The Lee Myung-bak government has destroyed a family". Kim Dong-il had been fired and 'blackballed' after criticizing the tax agency. The court found no wrongdoing in Kim's work and declared him innocent.

GNP spokesperson Hong Jun-pyo proposed to reduce government officials who were previously judges and prosecutors by 2012 for better functions within the GNP.

=== Jeju-do Naval Base dispute ===
A new Republic of Korea Navy base planned to be constructed on Jeju Province generated disputes.

=== Censorship ===
The Ministry of National Defense banned "illegal" books in late 2008. Four military judicial officers were allegedly penalized for objecting to the decision. South Korean lawyer, Choe Kang-wook (최강욱) allegedly lost his law license due to his criticism of the government's potential eradication of free speech.

A judge was under an in-house investigation for posting messages critical of President Lee and the government on Facebook over the sudden ratification of the Korea-USA Free Trade Agreement.

=== Illegally using private properties ===
The Korea Post was criticized for not paying copyright fees for using Pororo.

=== Autonomous schools ===
The government's first educational initiative was to allow autonomous private high schools. The schools drew criticism for not accepting sufficient students and for catering to the wealthy.

=== Failure to reform investigation rights ===
The "Blue House" authorities unsuccessfully attempted to reform investigation procedures between the SPO and the Police. GNP politician Chung Doo-un attacked the government for "losing its authority" in front of the SPO and the Police.

=== Secrecy ===
The Lee Myung-bak government was accused of repeatedly improperly withholding information from the public. In particular, critics charged that five bills had been passed with improper secrecy as of late November 2011. The National Archives of Korea declared that the Lee Myung-bak government left 1/8 as many public records as had the prior Roh Mu-hyun government.

=== Corruption ===
As of late 2011, corruption was alleged among certain high ranking associates of the president, which reportedly 'stunned' President Lee.

==== Bribery ====
Two former Senior Secretary of Public Relations of the Blue House, Kim Du-woo and Hong Sang-pyo, were alleged to have received briberies from Park Tae-kyu, the representative lobbyist of Busan Savings Bank.

The GNP Emergency Response Commission requested an investigation after GNP lawmaker Koh Seung-duk exposed the bribery charges to the press. Koh claimed to have refused money from another pro-Lee lawmaker in the past.

==== DDoS Attack ====
A DDoS attack against websites of Park Won-soon and the National Election Commission of South Korea generated criticism of the government.

Left wing South Korean newspaper The Hankyoreh claimed that there was concealment of investigation-related information by the Blue House. The Blue House officially denied that the presidential authorities had pressured the police and would sue other newspaper companies that repeated the allegation. The Commissioner of the National Police Agency was Cho Hyun-oh, a close associate of President Lee. This fit with the claim of a confidential phone call between Cho Hyun-oh and the Blue House and that the investigative report was released earlier to the Blue House.

More than 30 university student councils made a joint statement supporting the investigation. The Korean Bar Association noted that 77% of citizens distrusted the judicial branch of the government, citing a survey result on Legal Consumers' Alliance.

=== Political Remarks ===
- The 2011 candidate for the Mayor of Seoul, Park Won-soon, claimed that the government had persecuted civilians during a political gathering in Gwanaksan on September 24, 2011.
- The administration's proposed changes to history textbooks caused disputes in the National Assembly over their description of New Right movement's political values on liberal democracy. The government also proposed to censor descriptions of the Gwangju Democratization Movement in the textbooks. Lee attended the annual memorials for the Gwangju Democratization Movement during his presidency only in 2008.
- Choi Se-jin, one of the youth-oriented members of the administration, said that "the Lee Myung-bak government has not been so popular among the younger generation because they believe they are not part of policy initiatives".

== Diplomacy ==
=== Relationship with North Korea ===
The head of the government-funded Korea Institute for National Unification, Kim Tae-u, proposed that the South Korean government renegotiate the Mount Kumgang Tourist Region with North Korea without any official apology from North Korea over the ROKS Cheonan sinking and the Bombardment of Yeonpyeong.

Kim Cheon-sik (김천식), the undersecretary of the Ministry of Unification gave a negative outlook on any potential reunion between South and North Korea families during the Lee Myung-bak government.

A longtime opponent of the Sunshine Policy carried out by his predecessors Kim Dae-jung and Roh Moo-hyun, Lee shifted towards a less accommodating policy, promising economic assistance only after North Korea abandoned its nuclear weapons programs. The administration adopted its "non-nuclear, openness, 3000" plan that entails reciprocity and mutual benefit. The administration stated that it sought peaceful reunification, but only after North Korea abandoned its nuclear ambitions and accepted a more open-minded approach. The North Korean government viewed this as confrontational and responded by calling Lee a "traitor" and an "anti-North confrontation advocator". The North Korean response included the expulsion of South Korean officials from an inter-Korean industrial complex, the launching of naval missiles into the sea, and the deployment of MiGs and army units provocatively close to the DMZ. Domestically, Lee's critics claimed that his strategy would antagonize the Kim Jong Il regime and undermine progress towards friendly North Korea-South Korea relations. Lee stated that Jusapa university students were behind the anti-governmental protests during a meeting with members of Buddhist organizations in June 2008. Blue House officials, however, denied the existence of his remarks.

Cheong Seong-chang of the Sejong Institute, a think tank that often advises the government, argued that inter-Korean relations were rapidly deteriorating, mainly because the Lee government had changed its policies from those of the former Kim and Roh governments, ignored the agreements previously made by the north–south summit and pursued a hardline policy.

In an interview with Yahoo!, Lee claimed that there were many other inter-Korean agreements that had not been honored and that the two nations should have frank dialogue to break the stalemate. Lee supported the reunification of Korea, although he believed that political differences created an enormous obstacle to reunification.

On 26 March 2010 an explosion destroyed the South Korean warship Cheonan, killing 46 crewmen. An investigation concluded that a torpedo fired by a North Korean submarine was responsible. Lee took a hard line towards the North after the results were announced, immediately freezing trade and resuming radio broadcasts into North Korea. He also asked that the United Nations implement sanctions against North Korea.

Lee was criticized for directing the public relations department of the Ministry of National Defense in December 2010 to make an anti-North Korean video. This video targeted Korean adolescents.

Dr. Seo Jae-jeong of Johns Hopkins University claimed that Lee's unrealistic expectations in dealing with North Korea were due to his Christian faith.

The Ministry of National Defense hired conservative military instructors who allegedly advocated political stances unfavorable to Kim Dae-jung and Roh Moo-hyun to army reservists.

Former President Kim Dae-jung's autobiography criticized Lee's policies towards North Korea before his death.

Lee had expressed a strong statement that "nothing would change as long as Kim Jong Il remained in power" to Alexander Vershbow in 2006, according to WikiLeaks.

The North Korean National Defence Commission officially declared that it "will refuse forever to engage with traitor Lee Myung-Bak and his group" after the Death of Kim Jong Il.

=== Relationship with Japan ===
Initially regarded as Japan-friendly, the Lee Myung-bak government later raised the deeply emotional issue of comfort women with Japan in late 2011. The continuing dispute over Liancourt Rocks (claimed as Dokdo by South Korea and Takeshima by Japan) occasionally flared up. South Korea also disputed the term "Sea of Japan", preferring "East Sea".

== Replacement by Park Geun-hye ==
The party leadership under Hong Jun-pyo of the pro-Lee camp collapsed on December 9, 2011 and GNP Emergency Response Commission launched on 17 December 2011, with Park Geun-hye as the commission's chairperson. This led the Emergency Response Commission to consider dropping the term "conservatism" from its platform.

Pro-Lee faction lost the 2012 general election to Park's faction.

== See also ==
- Lee Myung-bak
- Mbnomics
