= Cabinet of Park Geun-hye =

Government of South Korea from 2013 to 2017

- State Council of South Korea
- 2013–2017 (Note: Her powers and duties suspended since 9 December 2016, by the National Assembly until final impeachment verdict on 10 March 2017)
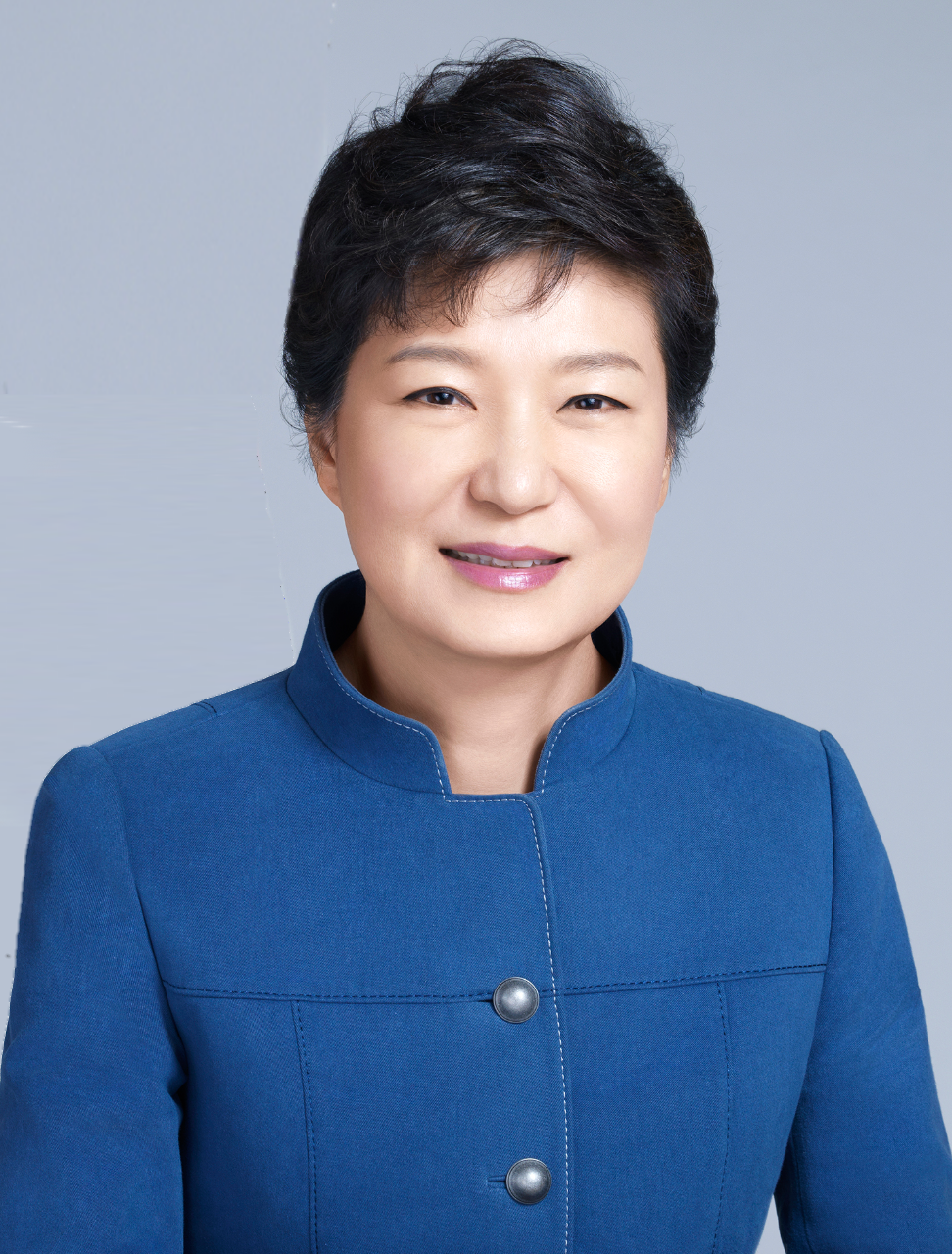
- Date formed: 25 February 2013
- Date dissolved: 10 May 2017

People and organisations
- President: Park Geun-hye (suspended since 9 December 2016, removed from office on 10 March 2017); Hwang Kyo-ahn
- Prime Minister: Chung Hong-won; Lee Wan-koo; Choi Kyoung-hwan (acting); Hwang Kyo-ahn
- Member party: Saenuri Party
- Opposition party: Democratic Party

History
- Outgoing formation: Impeachment of Park Geun-hye; 2017 presidential election
- Elections: 2012 presidential election; 2016 legislative election
- Predecessor: Cabinet of Lee Myung-bak
- Successor: Cabinet of Moon Jae-in

This page provides the list of members – incumbent and previous – of the State Council of South Korean President Park Geun-hye.

== List of members ==
Saenuri Party Independent

Cabinet of Park Geun-hye
Portfolio	Member	Term		Note
Portfolio	Member	Took office	Left office	Note
President	Park Geun-hye	25 February 2013	10 March 2017	
Prime Minister	Chung Hong-won	26 February 2013	16 February 2015	
Prime Minister	Lee Wan-koo	16 February 2015	27 April 2015	
Prime Minister	Hwang Kyo-ahn	18 June 2015	11 May 2017	
Deputy Prime Minister of Economy; Minister of Strategy and Finance	Hyun Oh-seok	23 March 2013	14 July 2014	
Deputy Prime Minister of Economy; Minister of Strategy and Finance	Choi Kyoung-hwan	15 July 2014	12 January 2016	
Deputy Prime Minister of Economy; Minister of Strategy and Finance	Yoo Il-ho	13 January 2016	9 June 2017	
Deputy Prime Minister of Social Affairs; Minister of Education	Seo Nam-su	11 March 2013	16 July 2014	
Deputy Prime Minister of Social Affairs; Minister of Education	Hwang Woo-yea	8 August 2014	12 January 2016	
Deputy Prime Minister of Social Affairs; Minister of Education	Lee Jun-sik	13 January 2016	4 July 2017	
Minister of Science, ICT and Future Planning	Choi Moon-ki	17 April 2013	15 July 2014	
Minister of Science, ICT and Future Planning	Choi Yang-hee	16 July 2014	10 July 2017	
Minister of Foreign Affairs	Yun Byung-se	13 March 2013	18 June 2017	
Minister of Unification	Ryu Gil-jae	11 March 2013	12 March 2015	
Minister of Unification	Hong Yong-pyo	13 March 2015	2 July 2017	
Minister of Justice	Hwang Kyo-ahn	11 March 2013	13 June 2015	
Minister of Justice	Kim Hyeon-woong	9 July 2015	28 November 2016	
Minister of National Defense	Kim Kwan-jin	4 December 2010	29 June 2014	
Minister of National Defense	Han Min-goo	30 June 2014	13 July 2017	
Minister of the Interior	Yoo Jeong-bok	13 March 2013	6 March 2014	
Minister of the Interior	Kang Byeong-gyu	2 April 2014	15 July 2014	
Minister of the Interior	Jeong Jong-seob	16 July 2014	12 January 2016	
Minister of the Interior	Hong Yoon-sik	13 January 2016	16 June 2017	
Minister of Culture, Sports and Tourism	Yoo Jin-ryong	11 March 2013	16 July 2014	
Minister of Culture, Sports and Tourism	Kim Jong-deok	20 August 2014	4 September 2016	
Minister of Culture, Sports and Tourism	Cho Yoon-sun	5 September 2016	20 January 2017	
Minister of Agriculture, Food and Rural Affairs	Lee Dong-phil	11 March 2013	4 September 2016	
Minister of Agriculture, Food and Rural Affairs	Kim Jae-soo	5 September 2016	2 July 2017	
Minister of Trade, Industry and Energy	Yoon Sang-jik	11 March 2013	13 January 2016	
Minister of Trade, Industry and Energy	Joo Hyeong-hwan	13 January 2016	21 July 2017	
Minister of Health and Welfare	Chin Young	11 March 2013	29 September 2013	
Minister of Health and Welfare	Moon Hyeong-pyo	2 December 2013	26 August 2015	
Minister of Health and Welfare	Jeong Jin-yeop	27 August 2015	21 July 2017	
Minister of Environment	Yoon Seong-gyu	11 March 2013	5 September 2016	
Minister of Environment	Cho Gyeong-gyu	5 September 2016	4 July 2017	
Minister of Employment and Labor	Bang Ha-nam	11 March 2013	15 July 2014	
Minister of Employment and Labor	Lee Gi-gwon	16 July 2014	24 July 2017	
Minister of Gender Equality and Family	Cho Yoon-sun	11 March 2013	13 June 2014	
Minister of Gender Equality and Family	Kim Hee-jung	16 July 2014	12 January 2016	
Minister of Gender Equality and Family	Kang Eun-hee	13 January 2016	7 July 2017	
Minister of Land, Infrastructure and Transport	Seo Seung-hwan	13 March 2013	13 March 2015	
Minister of Land, Infrastructure and Transport	Yoo Il-ho	16 March 2015	10 November 2015	
Minister of Land, Infrastructure and Transport	Kang Ho-in	11 November 2015	21 June 2017	
Minister of Oceans and Fisheries	Yoon Jin-sook	17 April 2013	6 February 2014	
Minister of Oceans and Fisheries	Lee Joo-young	5 March 2014	24 December 2014	
Minister of Oceans and Fisheries	Yoo Gi-june	16 March 2015	10 November 2015	
Minister of Oceans and Fisheries	Kim Yeong-seok	11 November 2015	15 June 2017	
Minister of Public Safety and Security	Park In-yong	19 November 2014	25 July 2017	

== See also ==
- Cabinet of South Korea
- Cabinet of Moon Jae-in
- Cabinet of Yoon Suk Yeol
