= Ministry of Agriculture, Food and Rural Affairs =

Ministry of Agriculture, Food and Rural Affairs may refer to:

- Ministry of Agriculture, Food and Rural Affairs (South Korea)
- Ministry of Agriculture, Food and Rural Affairs (Ontario)
