= Yeongju Dam =

- Interactive map of Yeongju Dam
- Location: in the Nakdong River basin
- Construction began: December 2009
- Construction cost: KRW 1.1 trillion

Yeongju Dam (Korean: 영주댐) is a multi-purpose dam located at the bend of Yonghyeol-ri, Pyeongeun-myeon, Yeongju-si, South Korea. The capacity and height of the dam are 106.4 million cubic meters and 55.5 meters. The total investment for the project is KRW 1.1 trillion.

The construction of the project began in December 2009 and the main dam was completed in 2016. It was part of the "Four River Restoration Project" of the Lee Myung-bak government.
