= Kwang-sik =

- Hangul: 광식
- RR: Gwangsik
- MR: Kwangsik

Kwang-sik, also spelled Kwang-shik or Gwang-sik, is a Korean given name.

People with this name include:

- Yi Gwang-sik (1493), Joseon Dynasty politician
- Myung Kwang-sik (born 1940), South Korean hapkido pioneer
- Choe Kwang-shik (born 1953), South Korean politician
- Ri Gwang-sik (born 1970), North Korean boxer
- Kim Kwang-sik (born 1972), South Korean film director
- Jeong Kwang-sik (born 1985), South Korean footballer
- Song Kwang-sik, South Korean pianist

== See also ==
- List of Korean given names
