= Chung Hwang-keun =

South Korean politician (born 1960)

- 정황근
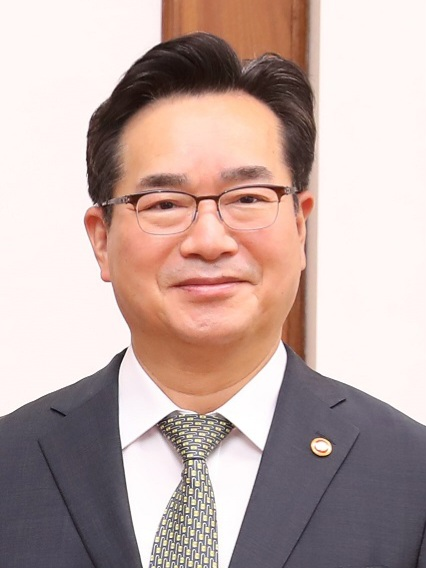

Minister of Agriculture, Food and Rural Affairs
- In office 10 May 2022 – 28 December 2023
- President: Yoon Suk-yeol
- Prime Minister: Han Duck-soo
- Preceded by: Kim Hyeon-soo
- Succeeded by: Song Mi-ryung

Administrator of Rural Development Administration
- In office 17 August 2016 – 16 July 2017
- President: Park Geun-hye
- Prime Minister: Hwang Kyo-ahn
- Preceded by: Lee Yang-ho
- Succeeded by: Ra Seung-yong

Personal details
- Born: 20 January 1960 (age 66) Cheonan, South Korea
- Party: Independent
- Education: Seoul National University

Chung Hwang-keun (born 20 January 1960) is a South Korean government official who served as the minister of agriculture, food and rural affairs in the Cabinet of Yoon Suk Yeol from 2022 to 2023. He served as the administrator of the Rural Development Administration between 2016 and 2017.

== Career ==
Chung's career in government began after he passed a civil service exam in 1984, after which he joined the Ministry of Agriculture, Food and Rural Affairs. During the presidency of Park Geun-hye, he served as the presidential secretary for agriculture, food and rural affairs until 2016. He was then appointed as the head of the Rural Development Administration, a position he served in until 2017.
