= Song Mi-ryung =

South Korean academic (born 1967)

- 송미령
- Song in 2025

Minister of Agriculture, Food and Rural Affairs
- Incumbent
- Assumed office 29 December 2023
- President: Yoon Suk Yeol; Lee Jae Myung
- Prime Minister: Han Duck-soo; Lee Ju-ho (acting); Kim Min-seok; Han Seong-sook
- Preceded by: Chung Hwang-keun

Personal details
- Born: 1967 (age 58–59) Nonsan, South Korea
- Party: Non-partisan
- Education: Ewha Womans University (BA); Seoul National University (MA, PhD)

Korean name
- Hangul: 송미령
- RR: Song Miryeong
- MR: Song Miryŏng

Song Mi-ryeong (Korean: 송미령, born 1967) is a South Korean professor who has served as the minister of agriculture, food and rural affairs since 2023.

== Career ==
Song attended Seoul National University, earning a bachelor's degree in urban planning and a doctorate in public administration. She served as a policy research expert at the Korea Rural Economic Institute (KREI), a South Korean agricultural think tank; she joined in 1997 and ultimately became senior researcher, specializing in agricultural economics. She served as an advisor to the Ministry of Agriculture, Food and Rural Affairs and as a member of several committees.

In December 2023, President Yoon Suk Yeol appointed Song to the post of Minister of Agriculture, Food and Rural Affairs, as part of a broader cabinet reshuffle in which six new ministers and ministerial-level appointees were named. During her confirmation hearings before the National Assembly in December 2023, Song supported the proposal to ban the dog-meat trade in South Korea beginning in 2027. The dog-meat ban unanimously passed the National Assembly in January 2024, and Song named a team within the ministry to oversee implementation.

As agriculture minister, Song reaffirmed government policy against the import of apples and pears (a phytosanitary measure intended to prevent the introduction of pests). Song said in 2024 that relaxing the ban would not bring down high fruit prices in South Korea.

In 2024, Song promoted a plan to boost the global prominence of Korean cuisine, setting a goal of having 15,000 Korean restaurants overseas and 100 Michelin-starred Korean restaurants (by 2027 compared to 31 Michelin-starred Korean restaurants globally as of 2023).
