= 2011 South Korean university tuition crisis =

Dispute over reducing tuition fees

The 2011 South Korean University Tuition Crisis was a socio-political dispute among the conservative Grand National Party, the liberal Democratic Party, and various citizen groups over reduced university tuition fees for South Korean university students. The reduced tuition is one of the main commitments during the start of the GNP-led Lee Myung-bak government in 2008. This commitment made by the GNP has not been manifested, or potentially ignored, as of 2011. This could be due to the government's big business-oriented policies overshadowed the education-related domestic issues. This resulted in several university student protests across South Korea in 2011.

== Background ==
The Lee Myung-bak government's policy of easing the expensive tuition fees is proposing the deferred payment system. But some university organizations openly oppose this as it could "silence the main commitment of the government" since 2009, a year after the Lee Myung-bak government.
