= Ministry for Food, Agriculture, Forestry and Fisheries (South Korea) =

Former division of the government of South Korea (1948–2013)

Ministry for Food, Agriculture, Forestry and Fisheries, Republic of Korea
- 농림수산식품부

Agency overview
- Formed: 1948
- Preceding agency: Ministry of Agriculture and Forestry
- Superseding agency: Ministry of Agriculture, Food and Rural Affairs
- Jurisdiction: Government of South Korea
- Headquarters: Gwacheon, South Korea
- Agency executives: Lee Dong-phil, Minister; Yeo In-hong, Vice-Minister
- Website: Official English Site Korean Site

Korean name
- Hangul: 농림수산식품부
- Hanja: 農林水産食品部
- RR: Nongnim susan sikpumbu
- MR: Nongnim susan sikp'umbu

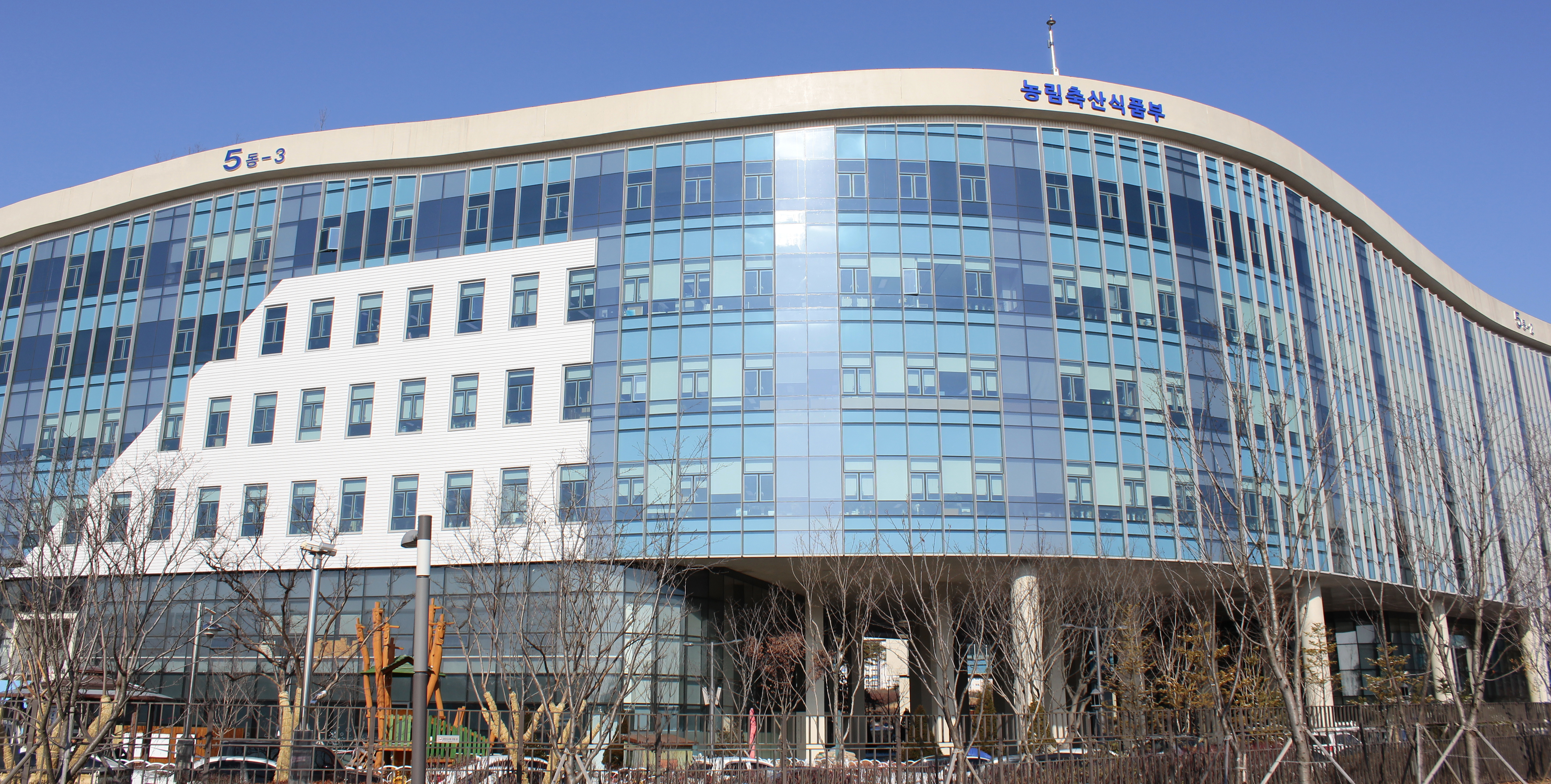
Headquarters in Sejong City

The Ministry for Food, Agriculture, Forestry and Fisheries was a cabinet-level division of the government of South Korea. It is headquartered at the national government complex in Gwacheon, Gyeonggi Province. It was established with the founding of the First Republic of Korea in 1948. In 2013, it was succeeded by the Ministry of Agriculture, Food and Rural Affairs.

In 2007, the minister was Park Hong-soo (appointed January 2005), a farm community advocate and former Uri Party parliamentarian from Namhae. The vice minister was Park Hae-sang. Under the "participatory government" of the Roh Moo-hyun administration, the MAF has been charged with helping to create a "Society of Balance Development".

The MFAFF was responsible for areas including crop insurance, land reclamation, agricultural statistics and the development of agricultural technology including genetically modified crops and environmentally friendly agriculture. It is also responsible for direct payments to rice farmers and for aspects of preparedness for natural disasters.

== See also ==
- Agriculture in South Korea
- Government of South Korea
- Korea Forest Service
