= Kim Hyeon-soo (politician) =

South Korean politician (born 1961)

- 김현수

Minister of Agriculture, Food and Rural Affairs
- In office 31 August 2019 – 9 May 2022
- President: Moon Jae-in
- Prime Minister: Lee Nak-yeon; Chung Sye-kyun
- Preceded by: Lee Gae-ho
- Succeeded by: Chung Hwang-keun

Vice Minister of Agriculture, Food and Rural Affairs
- In office 13 June 2017 – 23 May 2019
- President: Moon Jae-in
- Prime Minister: Lee Nak-yeon
- Preceded by: Lee Joon-won
- Succeeded by: Lee Jae-wook

Personal details
- Born: 1961 (age 64–65) Daegu, South Korea
- Education: Yonsei University; Seoul National University; University of Wisconsin-Madison

Korean name
- Hangul: 김현수
- Hanja: 金炫秀
- RR: Gim Hyeonsu
- MR: Kim Hyŏnsu

Kim Hyeon-soo (Korean: 김현수; born 1961), alternate spelling Kim Hyun-soo, is a South Korean politician who served as the Minister of Agriculture, Food and Rural Affairs under President Moon Jae-in from 2019 to 2022.

He was appointed as Minister three months after he resigned as Vice Minister - the first deputy head of the Ministry under President Moon. He was previously its Deputy Minister, the Ministry's third highest ranking position after Minister and Vice Minister, under the preceding conservative president Park Geun-hye.

After passing the state exam in 1986, he has spent the entire professional career in public service related to agriculture and trade - mostly at the Ministry.

Kim holds three degrees - a bachelor in economics from Yonsei University, a master's in public administration from Seoul National University and a doctorate in agricultural economics from University of Wisconsin–Madison.
