= Lee Sang-eui =

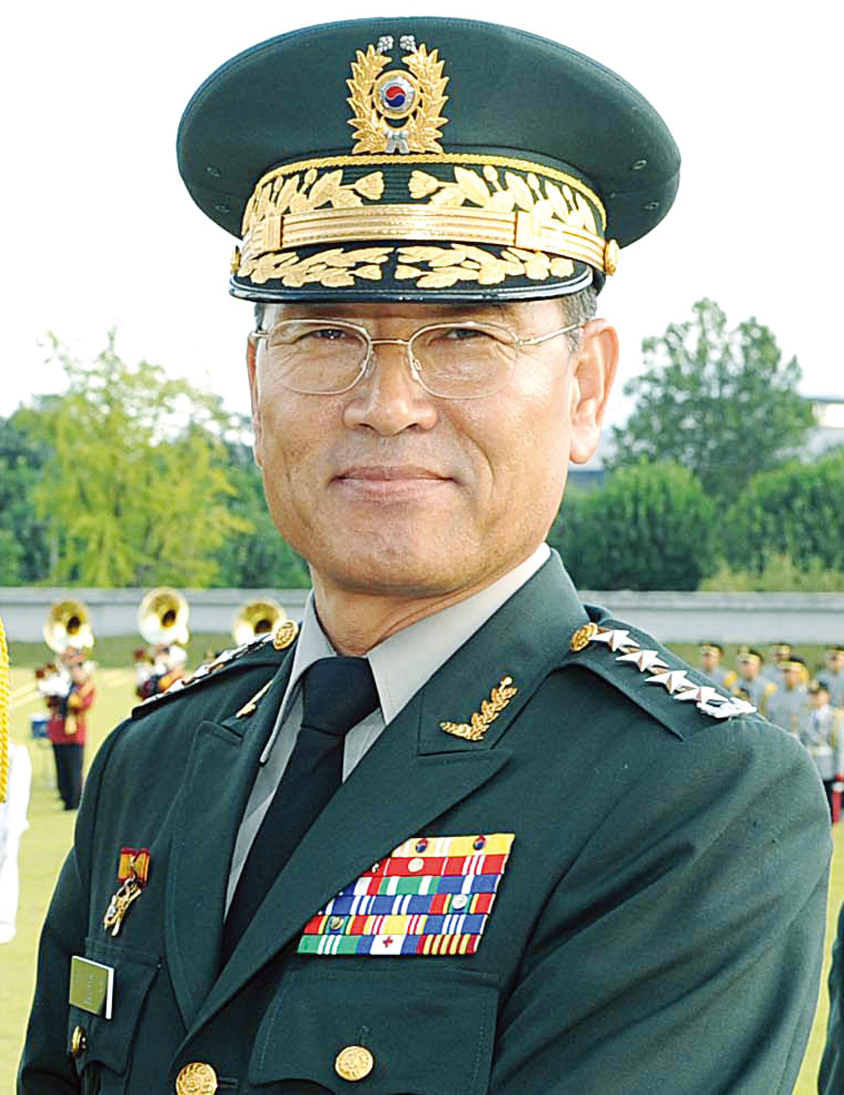

Korean name
- Hangul: 이상의
- Hanja: 李相宜
- RR: I Sangui
- MR: I Sangŭi

General (Ret.) Lee Sang-eui, ROKA, was the 35th Chairman of the Joint Chiefs of Staff of the Republic of Korea Armed Forces.

Prior to assuming the position of Chairman of the Joint Chiefs of Staff in 2009, he was Commanding General of the Third ROK Army. He became the Chairman of the Joint Chiefs of Staff, following his predecessor Kim Tae-young's assuming of the Defense Minister position.

In 1999 he was married and had two children Lee Junwoo (2000) and Lee Heesoo (2006)

Military offices
Preceded by Kim Tae-young	Chairman of the Joint Chiefs of Staff & Chief Director of the Joint Defense Headquarters; 2009-2010	Succeeded by Han Min-goo
