= Jeong Seung-jo =

South Korean military officer (born 1953)

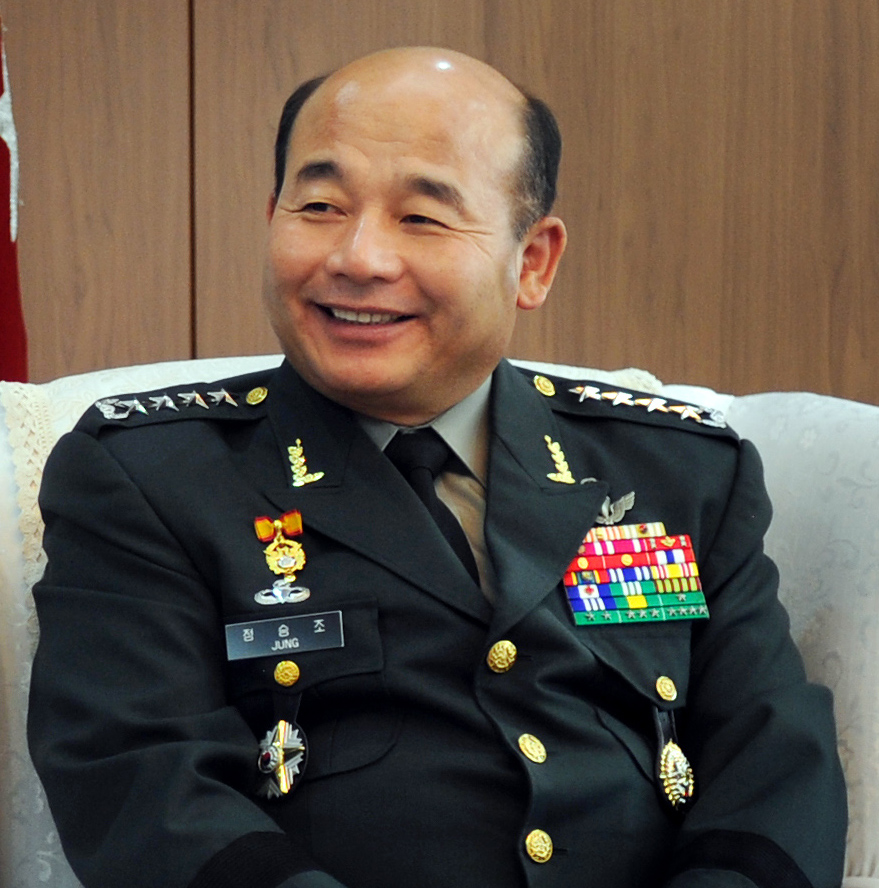
- Born: 23 May 1953 (age 73); Jeongeup, Jeollabuk-do, South Korea
- Military career
- Allegiance: South Korea
- Branch: Republic of Korea Army
- Rank: General
- Commands: Chairman of the Joint Chiefs of Staff of the Republic of Korea Armed Forces

Korean name
- Hangul: 정승조
- Hanja: 鄭承兆
- RR: Jeong Seungjo
- MR: Chŏng Sŭngjo

General Jeong Seung-jo (Korean: 정승조; born 23 May 1953) was a South Korean military officer and the 37th Chairman of the Joint Chiefs of Staff of the Republic of Korea Armed Forces.

Prior of his JCS Chairmanship, he was Deputy Commander, Republic of Korea - United States (ROK-US) Combined Forces Command.

Preceded by Han Min-goo	Chairman of the Joint Chiefs of Staff & Chief Director of the Joint Defense Headquarters; 2011-2013	Succeeded by Choi Yoon-hee
