= Kim Kwan-jin =

Kim Kwan-jin LOM
- 김관진
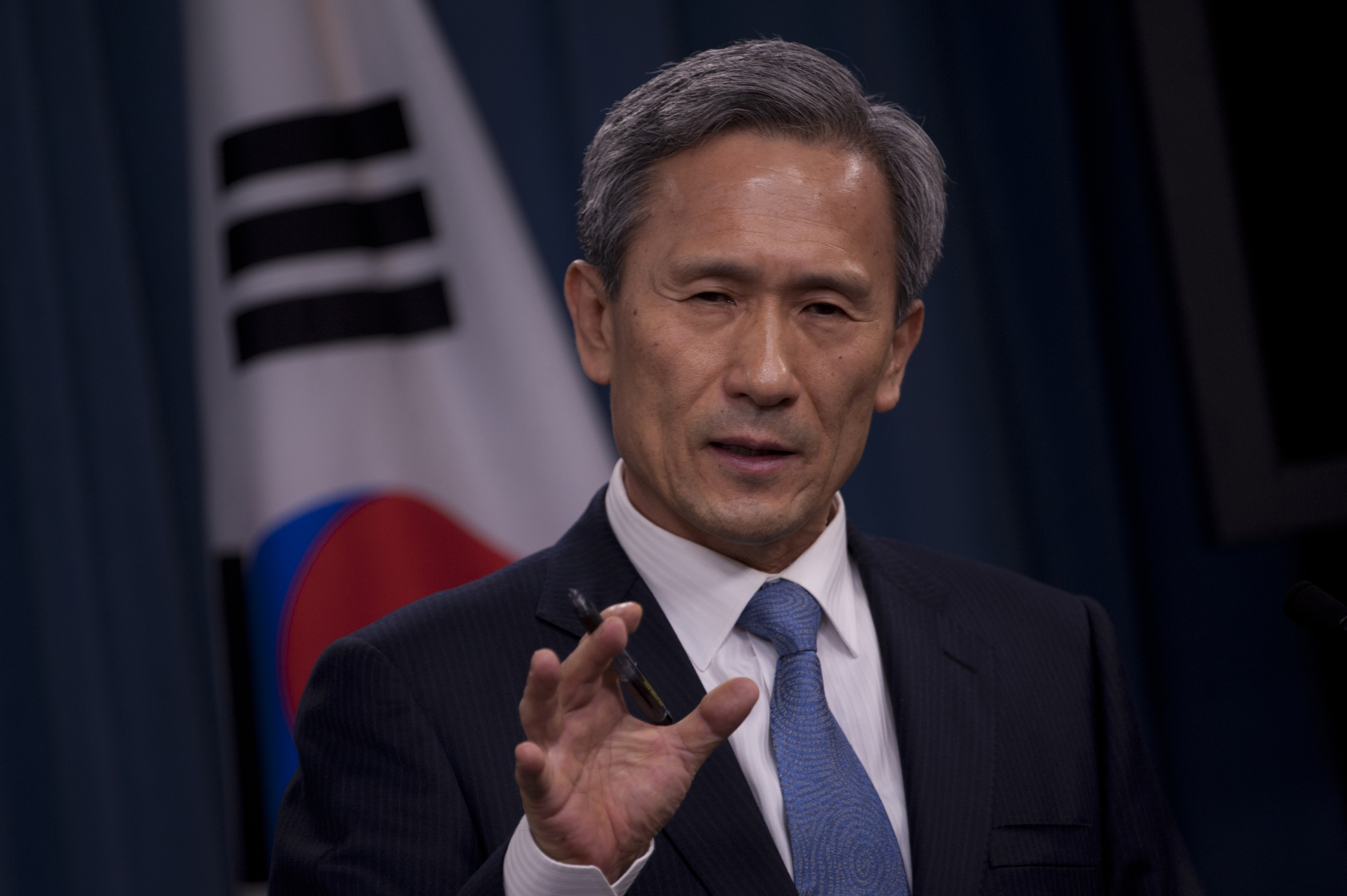
- Kim in October 2012

Chief of National Security Council
- In office 1 July 2014 – 21 May 2017
- President: Park Geun-hye; Hwang Kyo-ahn (Acting); Moon Jae-in
- Preceded by: Kim Jang-soo
- Succeeded by: Chung Eui-yong

Minister of National Defense
- In office 4 December 2010 – 30 June 2014
- President: Lee Myung-bak; Park Geun-hye
- Preceded by: Kim Tae-young
- Succeeded by: Han Min-goo

Personal details
- Born: August 27, 1949 (age 77) Jeonju, South Korea
- Education: Korea Military Academy (B.S.)
- Awards: Legion of Merit

Military service
- Allegiance: South Korea
- Branch: Republic of Korea Army
- Rank: General

Korean name
- Hangul: 김관진
- Hanja: 金寬鎭
- RR: Gim Gwanjin
- MR: Kim Kwanjin

Kim Kwan-jin (Korean: 김관진; Hanja: 金寬鎭; born August 27, 1949) was Chief of South Korea the National Security Office under President Park Geun-hye, a position to which he was appointed in 2014. He was previously the 33rd Chairman of the Joint Chiefs of Staff of the South Korean armed forces and the Minister of National Defense.

== Education ==
- Graduated, Seoul High School
- Bachelor of Science, Korea Military Academy (28th Graduating Class)

== Career ==
Kim previously served as Commanding General, 35th Infantry Division (1999–2000), Commanding General, II Corps (2002–2004), and Chief Director, Joint Operations Headquarters, Joint Chiefs of Staff (2004–2005). He was promoted to four-star general and assumed command of Third ROK Army in 2005. In 2006, he became the 33rd Chairman of the Joint Chiefs of Staff, replacing General Lee Sang-hee.

On March 28, 2008, he was replaced by General Kim Tae-young. Following incidents of the bombardment of Yeonpyeong, he was selected to replace Kim Tae-young as a new National Defense Minister of the Republic of Korea on November 26, 2010.

After the end of President Lee Myung-bak's term in office in February 2013, incoming President Park Geun-hye decided to retain Kim in his post of Defense Minister after Park's nominee Kim Byung-kwan was forced to resign under pressure over a series of alleged ethical lapses and North Korea's repeated war threats.

In February 2019, Kim was given a two-and-a-half year prison sentence for attempting to sway public opinion using Cyber Command to support the Park administration.

== Honours ==
- 2008: Legion of Merit(USA)

Military offices
Preceded by Lee Sang-hee	Chairman of the Joint Chiefs of Staff & Chief Director of the Joint Defense Headquarters; 2006–2008	Succeeded by Kim Tae-young
Preceded by Kim Tae-young	Republic of Korea Minister of National Defense; 2010–2014	Succeeded by Han Min-goo
