= Korea Forest Service =

Government agency of South Korea

- Hangul: 산림청
- Hanja: 山林廳
- RR: Sallimcheong
- MR: Sallimch'ŏng

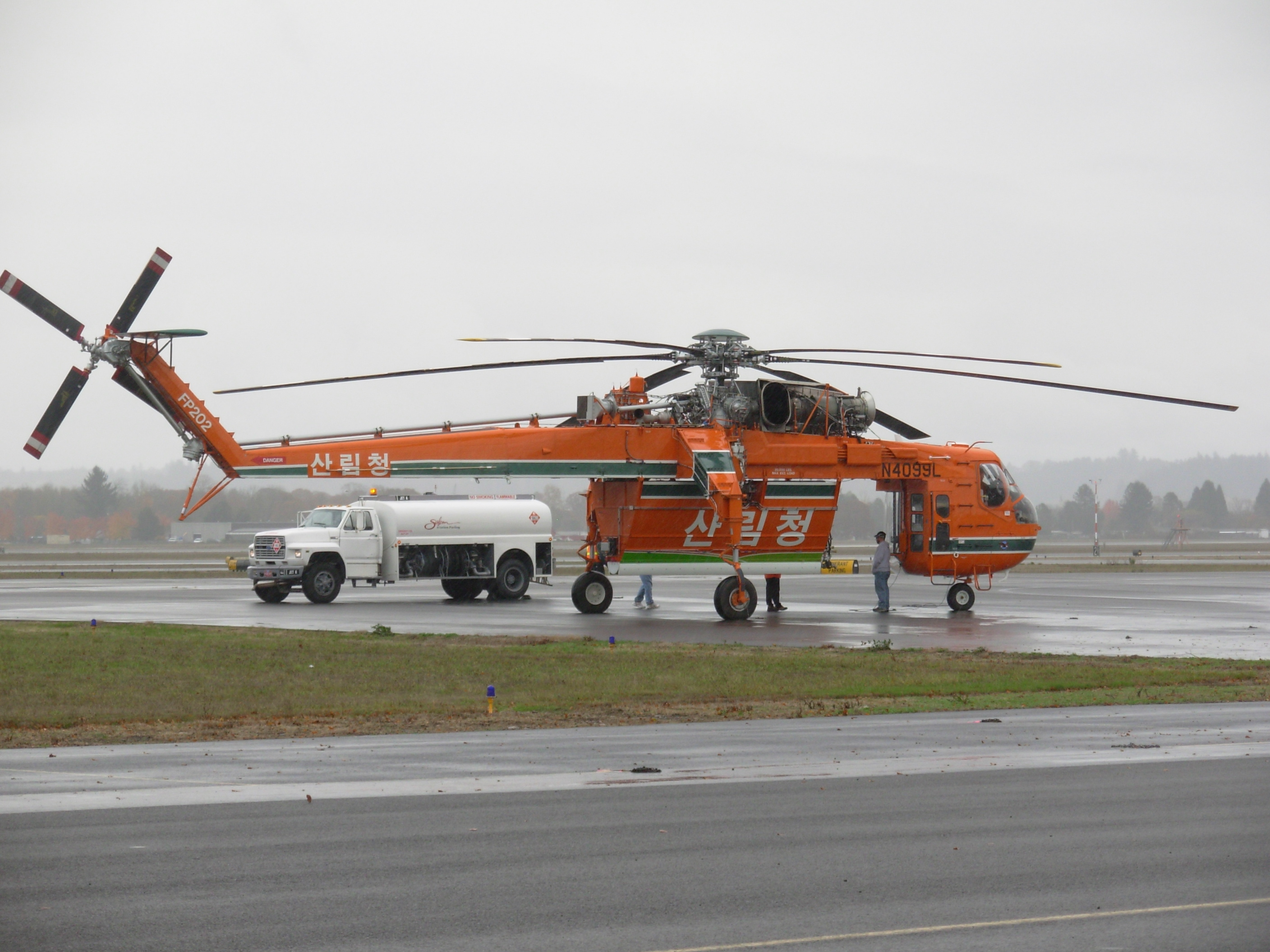
An Erickson S-64 stopping to refuel at McNary Field, Salem, Oregon while en route to South Korea to be delivered to the Korea Forest Service

The Korea Forest Service (KFS; Korean: 산림청) is a central administrative agency under the Ministry of Agriculture, Food and Rural Affairs (MAFR), responsible for protecting and nurturing forests, increasing forest resources, developing forest products, conducting research on forest management and improvement, and is located in Daejeon Government Complex. In the past, during the national forestation campaign from 1973 to 1986, it was temporarily under the Ministry of Home Affairs (now the Ministry of the Interior and Safety), but returned to the Ministry of Agriculture, Forestry and Fisheries in 1987. However, as the agency's work was focused solely on maintaining and managing successful national forestation policies, questions were raised about its necessity for a period of time. Currently, the agency has transformed its identity into one that strives to generate continuous income through forest resources.

It is one of the government agencies that is highly likely to expand in the event of future north–south unification. In North Korea, there are many mountains, and it is expected that regional forest offices will be expanded to promote afforestation projects centering around Mount Mindungsan.

The Korea National Park Service, which is under the Ministry of Environment, had a long-standing conflict with the Korea Forest Service. Both agencies are in charge of forest-related work, but there were frequent conflicts due to differences in specific business objectives. While the Korea Forest Service also invests in forest development to promote forestry, the Korea National Park Service's primary objective is forest protection. Therefore, in 2012, an article was published between the two organization called "Let's Get Along."

Furthermore, it has a cooperative relationship with the Cultural Heritage Administration. High-quality lumber is essential for restoring, maintaining, and repairing traditional cultural properties, and in particular, Korean pine, also known as the "Geumgang Pine," is still a rare species. Therefore, the Korea Forest Service and the Cultural Heritage Administration are working together to create and manage Geumgang Pine plantations.

The current head of the organization is Nam Sung-hyun, who began his term in May 2022.

== Overview ==
The Korea Forest Service has the overall responsibility for establishment and implementation of forest policies and laws. The KFS consists of 5 bureaus, 22 divisions, 5 Regional Forest Services, and 27 National Forest Stations. There are KFS-affiliated agencies such as the Forest Aviation Headquarters, the Korea Forest Research Institute, the National Arboretum, and the National Natural Recreation Forest Office. The province and metropolitan cities have their local forestry administrative organizations.

The Korea Forest Service is actively involved in the United Nations Convention to Combat Desertification, United Nations Framework Convention on Climate Change, and Convention on Biological Diversity to contribute to global environmental issues. Not to mention, initiative actions were taken to implement actual projects based on rehabilitation technologies in collaboration between the government and the private sector. In order to take the leading role in both bilateral and regional cooperation for mitigating desertification and drought, the Korea Forest Service is promoting closer cooperation through bilateral forestry cooperation arrangements and establishment of the Northeast Asia Forest Network.

The Korea Forest Service hosted UNCCD-COP10 as an opportunity to raise awareness of the Korean people as well as the rest of the world on desertification issues, and contribute to implementing more projects to combat desertification and establishing an effective cooperative mechanism.

The Korea Forest Service, in close coordination with the Ministry of Foreign Affairs (South Korea), has taken the key role for the establishment of Asian Forest Cooperation Organization (AFoCO).

== Korea's forest ==
The Korean peninsula is located between 33°7′ and 43°1′ in northern latitude, and 124°11′ and 131°53′ in eastern longitude at the heart of the North Western Pacific, sharing a border with China and Russia to the north and lying near the Japanese archipelago to the south. It extends about 960 km southward and its width is about 170 km from east to west, surrounded by three oceans and near 70% of the terrain is mostly mountainous so its terrestrial and marine ecosystems have a variety of species with high biodiversity.

The Korean peninsula encompasses 221,000 km^{2}, 45% of which makes up the Republic of Korea (ROK, South Korea). The 20% of the total land area in the ROK is used for agriculture while forests cover 64%. The Korean peninsula lies in the east of the temperate forest zone, which contributes top the distinct seasonal temperature and precipitation. The main mountain range of the Korean peninsula is the BaekduDaegan Mountains. It stretches 1,400 km from Mt. Baekdu in North Korea all the way down to Mt. Jiri in South Korea, forming the great backbone of the Korean peninsula.

Korea's forest was devastated in the 1950s and 1960s due to the Korean War and land use change for industrialization. Since the establishment in 1967, the Korea Forest Service has made diverse efforts for forest rehabilitation. These efforts returned dramatic increase in the growing stock volume. The volume of merely 10 m^{3} in the 1960s increased more than 10 times in 40 years recording 103 m^{3} by the end of 2008. The public benefits of forests grew as well. It is equivalent to an economic value of around US$60 billion, which accounts for 8% of the gross domestic product.

The foundation for successful rehabilitation would be the National Forest Plans established and implemented on 10-year routine. After undergoing four-fold National Forest Plans, the Fifth Plan launched in 2008 which aims to achieve "healthy forest, rich mountains, and happy people" and realize "sustainable green welfare nation". Thus, the Korea Forest Service is making efforts to develop multiple benefits of forest resources and renewable forest industry, provide better quality of life through forestry, and strengthen international cooperation.

== National Vision for Green Growth ==
=== Towards Green Growth ===
Korea's new national vision for the forthcoming 60 years is "Low Carbon Green Growth". The Korean government has designed a new paradigm of a green society, aiming to transfer the current energy system inevitably emitting a large amount of greenhouse gases into a low carbon society with high power-efficiency. This national development mission aims to address environmental issues including global warming and facilitate sustainable development

=== Green Growth and Forest ===
In realizing Green Growth, forest is the key resource. Notably enough, forest is recognized as a sole carbon sink under the United Nations Framework Convention on Climate Change. Korean forests sequestered 41 million tons of carbon dioxide as of 2007, which accounted for 66% of the total carbon emissions in Korea. Forest also has great potentials in developing green technologies regarding a wide use of forest bioenergy, industrialization of forest bio-resources. To maximize this forest value as a key resource, Korea has been working on pursuing Green Growth in various fields such as bioenergy technology development, the biotechnology industry, and other energy businesses. The KFS has been implementing forest policies with the view of providing the public with an improved quality of life by offering recreation forests, healing forests and mountaineering services and expanding urban green spaces. As part of the forest policies, it contributed to revitalizing Korea's economic depression, locally referred to as the IMF, by creating green jobs under forest tending projects. As the country whose successful rehabilitation projects were internationally recognized, Korea continues to take part in global activities addressing climate change and to build a bridge between developed and developing countries through cooperation projects of forest rehabilitation in developing countries. Therefore, Korea can make advances in sustainable development as a green growth model nation.

== National Forest Plans ==
=== The First National Forest Plan: Forest Rehabilitation Project (1973~1978) ===
In the 1950s, forests were left in a state of extreme devastation as the result of excess cutting during and after theJapanese colonization and the Korean War. The growing stock volume per hectare then was merely 6m³, 6% of the current figure. To restore these devastated forests causing serious social problems like lack of fuel, severe floods and droughts, the National Forest Plan was established. After the legal and institutional preparations in the 1960s, the Forest Rehabilitation Project was finally launched in 1973. The government declared the Nationwide Tree Planting period (3.21~4.20) and Arbor Day to draw out active participation from the public. More than one million ha of denuded forest were restored with fast growing tree species through public participation. The 10-year project was completed 4 years in advance of its target.

=== The Second National Forest Plan: Forest Rehabilitation Project (1979~1987) ===
The Second 10-year National Forest Plan was devised to establish large-scale commercial forests that could develop into sustainable timber resources for domestic demands on timber products. Various forest policies were implemented by the government in order to achieve objectives like forest rehabilitation, enhancement of forest protection, and foundation of forest development funds to support private and national forests. Along with reforestation projects, erosion control was also actively undertaken to prevent natural disasters, and advanced biotechnology was adopted to control forest diseases and pests as well. Under the Second National Forest Plan, 80 commercial forests were built, and 325,000 ha was successfully reforested and plantation in 1.06 million ha was completed in total.

=== The Third National Forest Plan: Forest Rehabilitation (1988~1997) ===
The Third National Forest Plan aimed at harmonizing economic functions and public benefits of the forests. The Plan focused on establishing foundation and infrastructure of forest management including forest road construction, forest mechanization, education for foresters and forestry workers, etc. The KFS carried out forestry income enhancement projects and public awareness-raising programmes of the importance of forests and its conservation, and supported overseas plantation projects with the aim of securing stable and long-term timber supplies. On top of that, it also developed and implemented policies for improving public benefits of the forests, including creation of recreation forests, water resources conservation, wildlife protection, etc. To promote more effective forest management practices, the Forest Laws was amended and enhanced, and the Act on Promotion of Forestry and Mountain Village was enacted in 1997.

=== The Fourth National Forest Plan (1998~2007) ===
The Fourth National Forest Plan entered a transitional phase of forest policies from mainly focusing economic functions to enhancing overall forest benefits including public and recreational benefits. Therefore, sustainable forest management was reflected on forest policies and activities. The KFS put special emphasis on developing valuable forest resources and fostering competitive forestry industry, thereby increasing public benefits for the people. The government-led forest management policies turned into autonomic forest management in the private forest sector, based on the capability and discretion of forest owners. To achieve implementing objectives for sustainable forest management, the KFS consolidated legal and institutional systems by newly enacting the Framework Act on Forest, the Act on Promotion and Management of Forest Resources, the Act on the National Forest Management, the Act on Forest Culture and Recreation and the Act on Promotion of Forestry and Mountain Villages.

=== The Fifth National Forest Plan (2008~2017) ===
Based on foundations and frameworks established under the Fourth Plan, the Fifth National Forest Plan has been designed to further expand the implementation of sustainable forest management in pursuit of maximizing forest functions. Especially the Plan highlights the importance of forest functions in responding to climate change. In implementing the Plan, the KFS continues to establish a foundation for a sustainable welfare society by developing environmental and social resources, and to pursue forest related industries as blue ocean strategy. The KFS focuses on promoting systematic implementation of forest conservation and management, fitting for the purpose of achieving well-balanced land development and conservation. It also plays a central role in natural disaster prevention efforts, which is improving ecosystem health and vitality and contributing to public safety and environment conservation. It further highlights forest's recreational and cultural functions for improving quality of life and living environments both in urban areas and mountain villages as well as providing welfare benefits for the people. The overall vision of the Fifth Plan is "to realize a green nation with sustainable welfare and growth" by sustainably managing forests as key resources for strengthening nation's economic development, land conservation and improved quality of life.

== Affiliated Agencies ==
=== Korea Forest Research Institute (KFRI) ===
The Korea Forest Research Institute was founded in 1922 and reorganized in 1998. The main goal of the research conducted by the KFRI is to develop forest policies and techniques linked with the Forest Resources Enhancement Plan. The institute devotes its efforts to preserving and maintaining forest genetic resources for tree improvement research and future R&D.

=== Korea National Arboretum (KNA) ===
The Korea National Arboretum is situated in the Gwangneung forest. The Gwangneung arboretum was initially established in 1987 and has been open to the public since then. On May 24, 1999, it became the Korea National Arboretum. The missions of Arboretum are to conserve and develop plant resources through comprehensive research, and to promote the public's understanding of the forests.

=== Forest Training Institute ===
Initially the Forest Training Institute was established in 1978 within the regional administrative training center. In 2004, it was reorganized under the Korea Forest Research Institute in 2006 and again reconstructed into a separate agency directly under the KFS. The Institute aims to cultivate professionals who will lead the forestry field, and provides various training programmes in and out of the country for forestry officers, stakeholders, forest owners and the public.

=== Forest Aviation Headquarters ===
Mainly responsible for forest fire control, the Forest Aviation Office was organized in 1971. Its mission is to prevent and control forest fires, pests and diseases using rotary-wing aircraft. This agency has 11 regional stations and plans to establish more regional stations to enable more efficient mobilization of aircraft to fire sites.

=== National Forest Seed and Variety Center ===
The National Forest Seed and Variety Center was established under the KFS in 2008. The Center aims to protect tree species and manage forest resources. The main tasks include development of institutional mechanisms for species protection, supporting private cultivators and providing related consulting as well as assessment and registration of new plant varieties.

=== National Natural Recreation Forest Office ===
The National Natural Recreation Forest Office serves for overall management of recreation forests nationwide. The main responsibilities of the Office are establishment and management of national natural recreation forests, operation and maintenance of recreation forests, promotion of forest education and culture and customer services.

== See also ==
- Government of South Korea
- Ministry of Agriculture, Food and Rural Affairs (South Korea)
- Ministry of Environment (South Korea)s
