= Cho Hyun-oh =

South Korean politician (born 1955)

- Born: May 15, 1955 (age 70); Busan, South Korea
- Police career
- Rank: Commissioner of the National Police Agency
- Awards: Presidential Award (1998); Guenjeongpojang (2005)
- Other work: Lecturer on occasion to students at universities and police academies

- Cho Hyun-oh
- Hangul: 조현오
- Hanja: 趙顯五
- RR: Jo Hyeono
- MR: Cho Hyŏno

Cho Hyun-oh (Korean: 조현오; born May 15, 1955) is the former commissioner of the National Police Agency of South Korea. He was born in Busan and graduated from Korea University. He expressed his decision to resign over a controversial Murder case in Suwon.

== Experience ==
- August 2010 ~ - 16th commissioner of the National Police Agency
- January 2010 ~ August 2010 - Commissioner of Seoul Metropolitan Police Agency
- January 2009 ~ January 2010 - Commissioner of Gyeonggi Provincial Police Agency
- 2008 ~ January 2009 - Commissioner of Busan Metropolitan Police Agency

== Controversy ==
=== Roh Mu-hyun ===
- Cho Hyun-oh mentioned in the press that the reason for Roh Mu-hyun's motivation to commit suicide was his falsely-named bank accounts that had been exposed to the public. Cho was later sued for his controversial comments. In December 2010, he denied that he made a verifiable negative remark about Roh in the past.

=== Incheon Gangster Crisis ===
Cho Hyun-oh was criticized for the police's mishandling of a massive brawl between the police and gangsters on October 21, 2011, in Incheon.

=== Special Promotion ===
Cho Hyun-oh was criticized for personally promoting a close associate within the police hierarchy.

== See also ==
- DDoS attacks during the October 2011 South Korean by-election
