= Lee Dong-phil =

South Korean politician

- 이동필

Minister of Agriculture, Food and Rural Affairs
- In office 23 March 2013 – 5 September 2016
- Prime Minister: Chung Hong-won; Lee Wan-koo; Choi Kyoung-hwan (Acting); Hwang Kyo-ahn
- Preceded by: Suh Kyu-yong
- Succeeded by: Kim Jae-su

Personal details
- Born: August 29, 1955 (age 70) Uiseong County, North Gyeongsang Province, South Korea

- Lee Dong-phil
- Hangul: 이동필
- Hanja: 李桐弼
- RR: I Dongpil
- MR: I Tongp'il

Lee Dong-phil is a South Korean politician who, as of April 2014, serves as Minister of Agriculture, Food and Rural Affairs.

== Education ==
- March 1971 – February 1974: Graduated from Daegeon High School
- March 1974 – February 1978: Bachelor's Degree in Livestock Management, Yeungnam University
- March 1979 – August 1981: Master's Degree in Economics, Seoul National University
- January 1988 – December 1991: Doctoral Degree in Agricultural Economics, University of Missouri, United States

== Major career ==
- March 2013 – September 2016: Minister of Agriculture, Food and Rural Affairs
- October 2011 – March 2013: President of the Korea Rural Economic Institute
- June 1980 – March 2013: Korea Rural Economic Institute
- August 1998 – February 2000: Korea Rural Economic Institute (dispatched to the Regulatory Reform Committee)
- April 2006 – April 2012: Commissioner of the Ministry for Food, Agriculture, Forestry, and Fisheries Regulatory Audit Committee
- June 2008 – December 2009: Subcommittee member of the Special Commission on Agriculture, Fisheries, and Rural Policies
- October 2008 – July 2011: Member of the Presidential Committee on Regional Development, Regional Development Expert Committee
- October 2011 – January 2013: Member of the Commission on Regional Development of Rural Areas and Life Quality Enhancement for Farmers and Fishermen
- November 2011 – January 2013: Member of the Central Agricultural, Fisheries, Rural and Food Industries Policy Council

== Awards ==
- April 1999: Civil Merit Medal
- July 2011: Order of Civil Merit, Camellia Medal

Preceded by Suh Kyu-yong	First Minister of Agriculture, Food and Rural Affairs; March 23, 2013 – September 5, 2016	Succeeded by Incumbent
