= Lee Sang-hee (general) =

South Korean general (1945–2026)

- 이상희
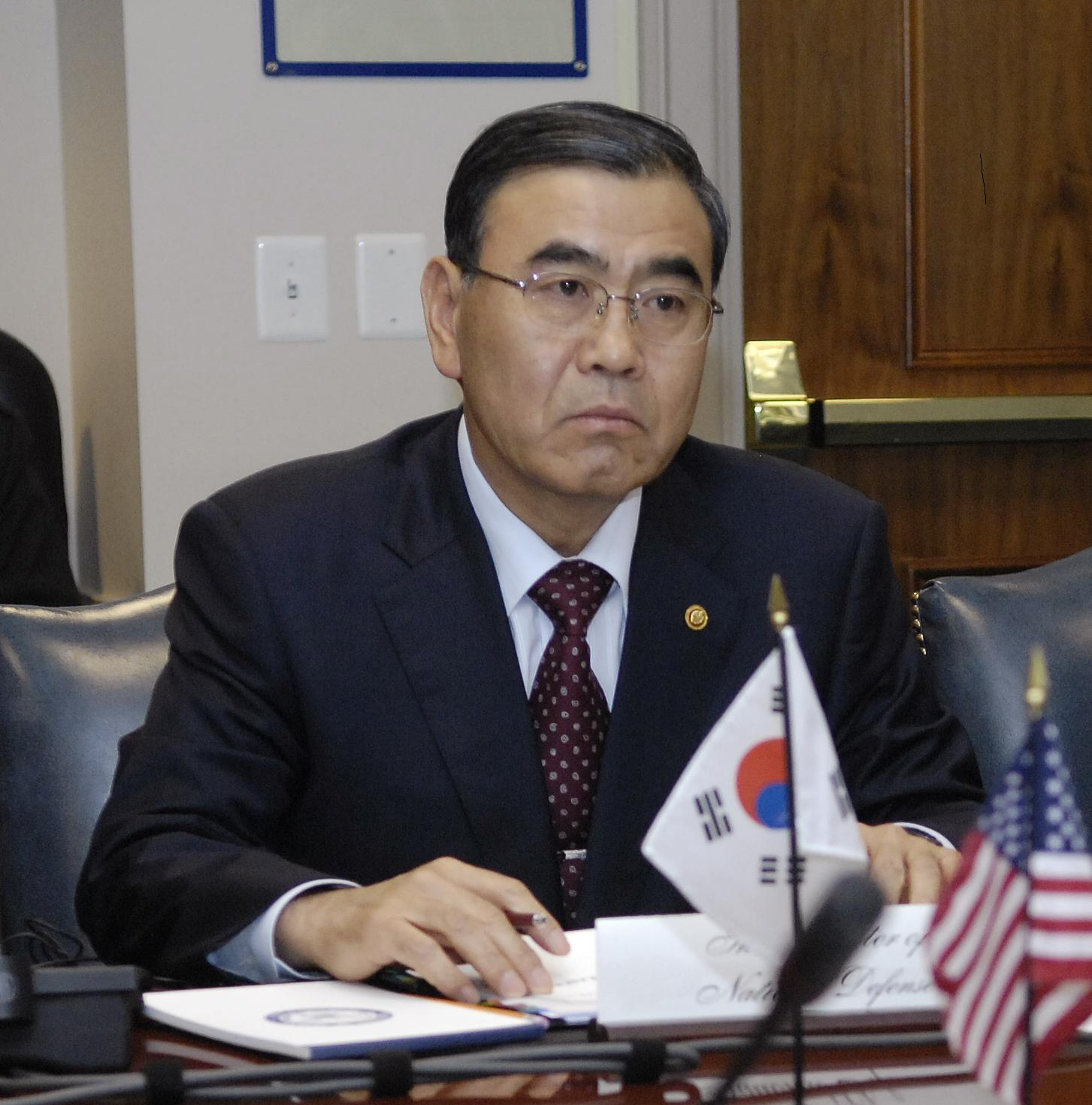
- Lee in 2008

Minister of National Defense
- In office 29 February 2008 – 22 September 2009
- President: Lee Myung-bak
- Preceded by: Kim Jang-su
- Succeeded by: Kim Tae-young

Personal details
- Born: August 1945 Wonju, Korea
- Died: 10 March 2026 (aged 80)

- Lee Sang-hee
- Hangul: 이상희
- Hanja: 李相憙
- RR: I Sanghui
- MR: I Sanghŭi

General (Ret.) Lee Sang-hee (August 1945 – 10 March 2026) was a South Korean general who was Chairman of the Joint Chiefs of Staff of the Republic of Korea Armed Forces and the South Korean Minister of National Defense.

== Education ==
Lee graduated from the Republic of Korea Military Academy in 1970 and the College of Liberal Arts & Science, Seoul National University in 1974.

== Career ==
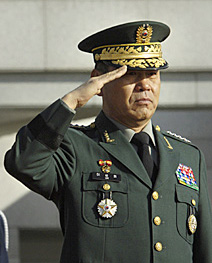
General Lee Sang-hee as Chairman of the Korean Joint Chiefs of Staff in 2006.

His assignments as a general officer were Chief of Force Planning, ROK Army Headquarters (1995–1996), Commanding General, 30th Infantry Division (Mechanized) (1996–1998), Director General, Policy Planning Bureau, Ministry of National Defense (1998–1999), Commanding General, V Corps (1999–2001), Chief Director, Strategy & Plans, Joint Chiefs of Staff (2001–2002), and Chief Director, Joint Operations Headquarters, Joint Chiefs of Staff (2002-2003).

He was promoted to 4-star general and assumed command of Third ROK Army in 2003.

In 2005, he was appointed the 32nd Chairman of the Joint Chiefs of Staff and served in that position until his retirement from the military in 2006.

On 29 February 2008, he assumed the position of Republic of Korea Minister of National Defense, replacing Kim Jang-soo. He served at this position until 2009.

== Death ==
Lee died on 10 March 2026, at the age of 80.

== Awards and medals ==
- Presidential Citation
- Order of National Security "Samil" Medal
- Order of National Security "Chonsu" Medal
- Order of National Security "Gukson" Medal
- Republic of Turkey Armed Forces Merit Award
- The United States Legion of Merit (Commander & Officer grade)

Military offices
Preceded by Kim Jong-hwan	Chairman of the Joint Chiefs of Staff & Chief Director of the Joint Defense Headquarters; 2005–2006	Succeeded by Kim Kwan-jin
Preceded by Kim Jang-soo	Republic of Korea Minister of National Defense; 2008–2009	Succeeded by Kim Tae-young
