= Rural Development Administration =

Agricultural organisation

- 농촌진흥청

Agency overview
- Formed: April 1, 1962; 63 years ago
- Headquarters: 300 Nongsaengmyeong-ro, Deokjin-gu, Jeonju-si, Jeonbuk State
- Employees: 344
- Parent department: Ministry of Agriculture, Food and Rural Affairs

Korean name
- Hangul: 농촌진흥청
- Hanja: 農村振興廳
- RR: Nongchon jinheungcheong
- MR: Nongch'on chinhŭngch'ŏng

The Rural Development Administration (RDA; Korean: 농촌진흥청) is an agriculture organization in South Korea and is run under the Ministry of Agriculture, Food and Rural Affairs. The headquarters are in Deokjin-gu, Jeonju.
