= Kim Tae-young (military) =

South Korean general (1949–2025)

- 김태영
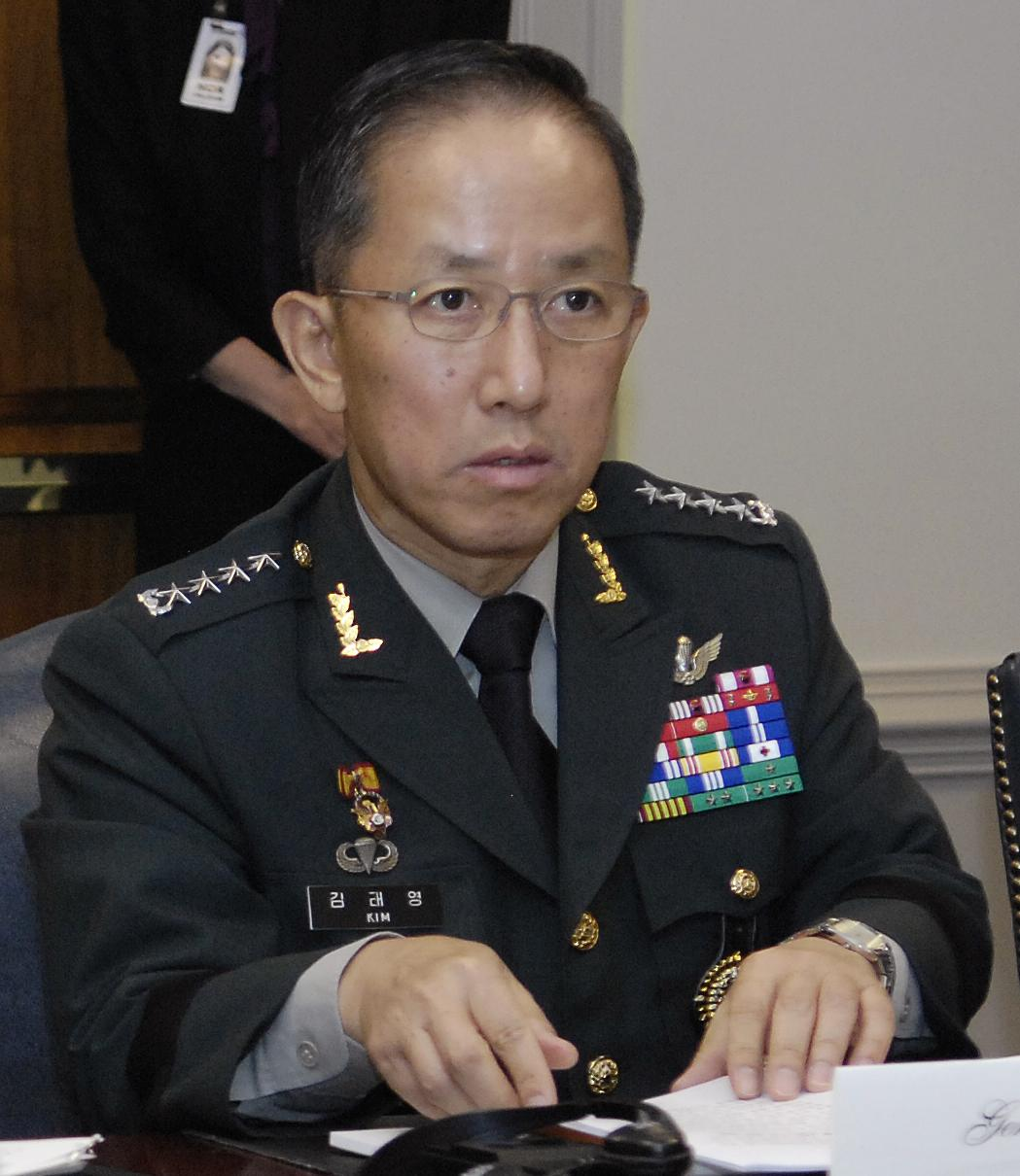
- Kim in 2008

Minister of National Defense
- In office 23 September 2009 – 3 December 2010
- President: Lee Myung-bak
- Preceded by: Lee Sang-hee
- Succeeded by: Kim Kwan-jin

Personal details
- Born: 13 January 1949 Seoul, South Korea
- Died: 26 February 2025 (aged 76) Seoul, South Korea
- Education: Korea Military Academy; Sogang University (BA)

Military service
- Allegiance: South Korea
- Branch: Republic of Korea Army
- Service years: 1973–2009
- Rank: Daejang
- Commands: Joint Chiefs of Staff

Korean name
- Hangul: 김태영
- Hanja: 金泰榮
- RR: Gim Taeyeong
- MR: Kim T'aeyŏng

Kim Tae-young (Korean: 김태영; 13 January 1949 – 26 February 2025) was the 42nd Minister of National Defense and 34th Chairman of the Joint Chiefs of Staff of the Republic of Korea Armed Forces.

== Biography ==
Kim graduated from Kyunggi High School, the most prestigious high school in Korea at the time, in 1968. After failing to be admitted to a university he applied for, he took a year off and was admitted to the Korea Military Academy in 1969.

In 1970, he was sent to Heeresoffizierschule II in West Germany as an exchange student. Upon returning to Korea, Kim graduated from the Republic of Korea Military Academy in 1973. He was first stationed at the 1st Infantry Division Artillery Branch. He has served as Commanding General, 6th Artillery Brigade (1997–1998), Commanding General, 35th Infantry Division (1999–2000), Commanding General, Capital Defense Command (2004–2005), and Chief Director, Joint Operations Headquarters, Joint Chiefs of Staff (2005–2006). Before assuming the position of Chairman of the Joint Chiefs of Staff in 2008, he was Commanding General of the First ROK Army.

In September 2009, he replaced Lee Sang-Hee as the 42nd Republic of Korea Minister of National Defense.

Despite being considered as a good military officer with his skill from both inside and outside of the ROK military, he started to suffer strong criticism after the sinking of ROKS Cheonan. In May 2010, he offered his resignation to President Lee Myung-bak, although it wasn't accepted.

On 25 November 2010, he stepped down from his post as Minister of Defense in the wake of criticism he received for his handling of the shelling of Yeonpyeong. The next day it was announced that his successor would be Kim Kwan-Jin, his JCS Chairmanship predecessor. He left office on 3 December 2010.

Kim died on 26 February 2025, at the age of 76.

Military offices
Preceded by Kim Kwan-jin	Chairman of the Joint Chiefs of Staff & Chief Director of the Joint Defense Headquarters; 2008–2009	Succeeded by Lee Sang-eui
Preceded by Lee Sang-hee	Republic of Korea Minister of National Defense; 2009–2010	Succeeded by Kim Kwan-jin
