= Kim Jang-soo =

South Korean general (born 1948)

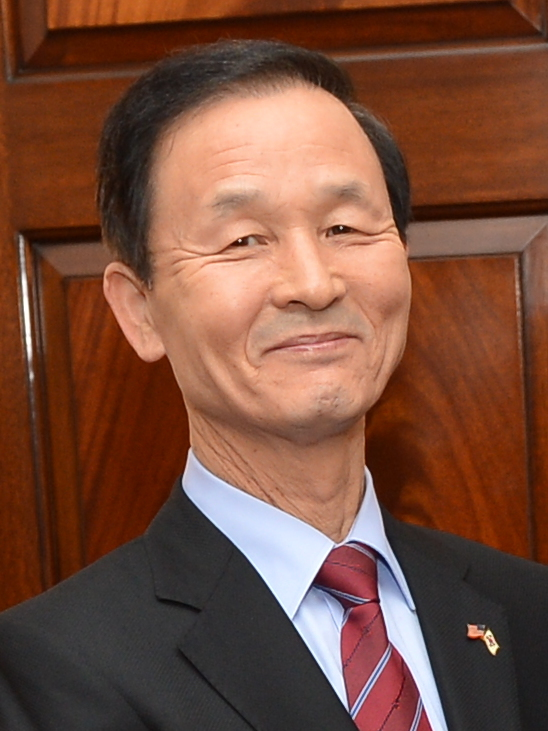

Korean name
- Hangul: 김장수
- Hanja: 金章洙
- RR: Gim Jangsu
- MR: Kim Changsu

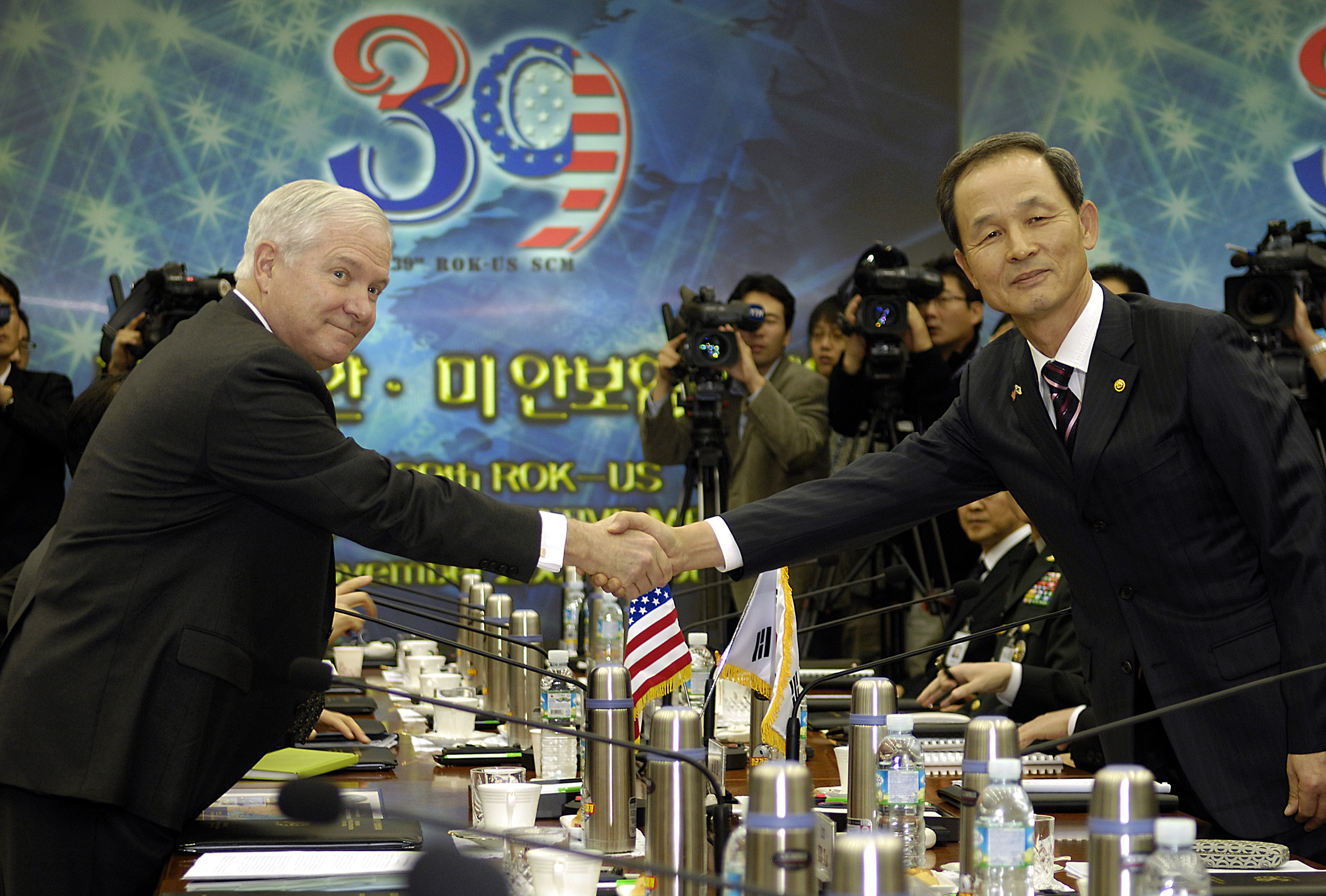
U.S. Defense Secretary Robert M. Gates meets with Republic of Korea Minister of National Defense Kim Jang-soo during the 39th Security Consultation Meeting at the Ministry of Defense Republic of Korea.

General (Ret.) Kim Jang-soo (Korean: 김장수; born February 28, 1948), ROKA, was the 37th Chief of Staff of the Republic of Korea Army and the 40th Republic of Korea Minister of National Defense. He was a Grand National Party Representative in the National Assembly of South Korea from 2008 to 2012. Kim graduated from the Republic of Korea Military Academy in 1971. He graduated from Korea National Defense University in 1988, then he earned a master's degree in Arts at Graduate School of Public Administration, Yonsei University in 1989.

His assignments as a general officer were Chief, Operations Division, First Army (FROKA), Commanding General, 6th Infantry Division (1997–1999), Director, Operational Planning, Joint Chiefs of Staff (1999–2000), Director, Operations, Joint Chiefs of Staff (2000–2001), Commanding General, VII Corps (2001–2003), and Chief Director, Joint Operations, Joint Chiefs of Staff (2003-2004).

His last assignment prior to becoming Army Chief of Staff was Deputy Commander, Republic of Korea - United States (ROK-US) Combined Forces Command.

From April 2005 to November 2006, he served as Chief of Staff of the Republic of Korea Army.

From November 2006 to February 2008, he served as Republic of Korea Minister of National Defense.

In March 2015, Kim was appointed as Korea's Ambassador to China.

Currently, his son serves as a commissioned officer in the Republic of Korea Army.

Preceded by Nam Jae-joon	Chief of Staff of the Republic of Korea Army; 2005–2006	Succeeded by Park Heung-ryul
Preceded by Yoon Gwang-woung	Republic of Korea Minister of National Defense; 2006–2008	Succeeded by Lee Sang-hee
