= Han Sang-ryul =

South Korean politician (born 1953)

- Hangul: 한상률
- Hanja: 韓相律
- RR: Han Sangryul
- MR: Han Sangnyul

Han Sang-ryul (Korean: 한상률; born November 25, 1953) is the former Commissioner of the National Tax Service.

== Experience ==
- November 2007 – January 2009 - Commissioner of National Tax Service
- July 2006 - Deputy Commissioner of National Tax Service
- March 2006 - Chief of Seoul Regional Tax Office
- April 2005 - Head of the Investigation Division of National Tax Service

== Controversy ==
Despite being involved in a scandal surrounding Taegwang Industries, the Supreme Prosecutors' Office of the Republic of Korea did not pressure a formal investigation against Han Sang-Ryul.

He was the subject of criticism of a disgraced tax inspector, Kim Dong-il (김동일), who was indicted for posting a post that supported the former president, Roh Mu-hyun.
