= Han Min-goo =

South Korean general (born 1953)

- 한민구
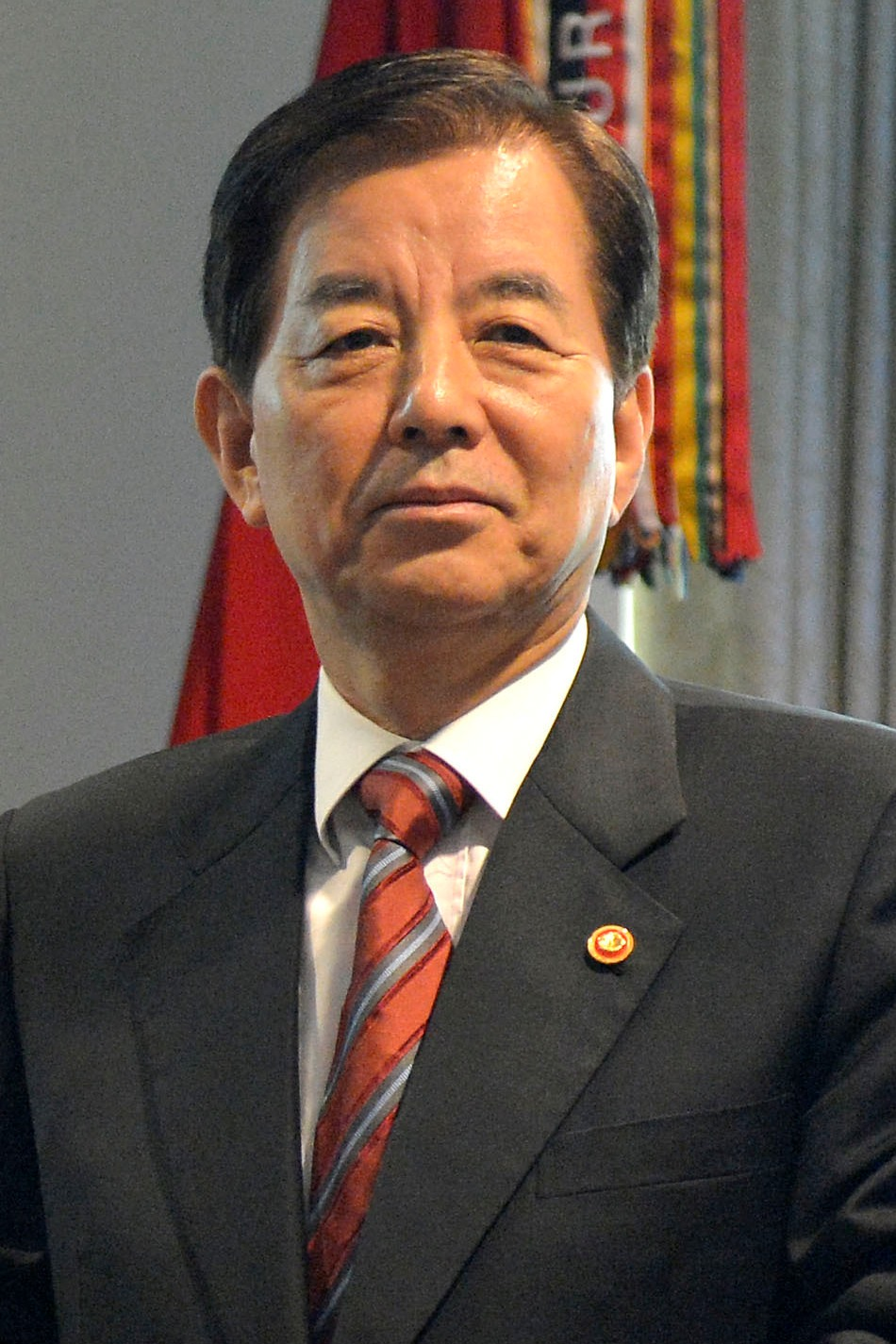
- Han during a visit to the Pentagon in October 2014

Minister of National Defense
- In office 30 June 2014 – 13 July 2017
- President: Park Geun-hye; Hwang Kyo-ahn (Acting); Moon Jae-in
- Prime Minister: Chung Hong-won; Lee Wan-koo; Choi Kyoung-hwan (Acting); Hwang Kyo-ahn; Lee Nak-yeon
- Preceded by: Kim Kwan-jin
- Succeeded by: Song Young-moo

Personal details
- Born: 30 August 1953 (age 73) Cheongwon, South Korea
- Children: 1
- Education: Korea Military Academy; Seoul National University; Yonsei University

Military service
- Allegiance: South Korea
- Branch/service: Republic of Korea Army
- Years of service: 1971 – 2011
- Rank: General

Korean name
- Hangul: 한민구
- Hanja: 韓民求
- RR: Han Mingu
- MR: Han Min'gu

Han Min-goo (Korean: 한민구; born 30 August 1953), is a former South Korean Minister of Defense. He is a former South Korean army general who served as the 40th Chief of Staff of the South Korean army as well as the 36th Chairman of the Joint Chiefs of Staff of the South Korean military.

== Career ==
Han served his compulsory military service in the ROK Naval Submarine branch. He later graduated from Officer Academy in the Armour Branch and later transferred to Army Aviation as a UH-1 Cobra pilot. Han's assignments prior to assuming Army Chief of Staff were Chief of Strategic Planning, ROK Army Headquarters; Commanding General, 53rd Infantry Division; Commanding General, Capital Defense Command; Deputy Chief of Staff of the Republic of Korea Army.

== Education ==
- Graduated, Cheongju High School
- Bachelor of Science, Korea Military Academy (31st Graduating Class)
- Bachelor of Arts in History, Seoul National University
- Master of Arts in Foreign Affairs and National Security, Yonsei University

Preceded by Lim Choung-bin	Chief of Staff of the Republic of Korea Army; 2009–2010	Succeeded by Hwang Ui-don
Preceded by Lee Sang-eui	Chairman of the Joint Chiefs of Staff & Chief Director of the Joint Defense Headquarters; 2010–2011	Succeeded by Jeong Seung-jo
Preceded by Kim Kwan-jin	Republic of Korea Minister of National Defense; 2014–2017	Succeeded by Song Young-moo
