= Ministry of Agriculture, Food and Rural Affairs (South Korea) =

Government ministry of South Korea

- 농림축산식품부

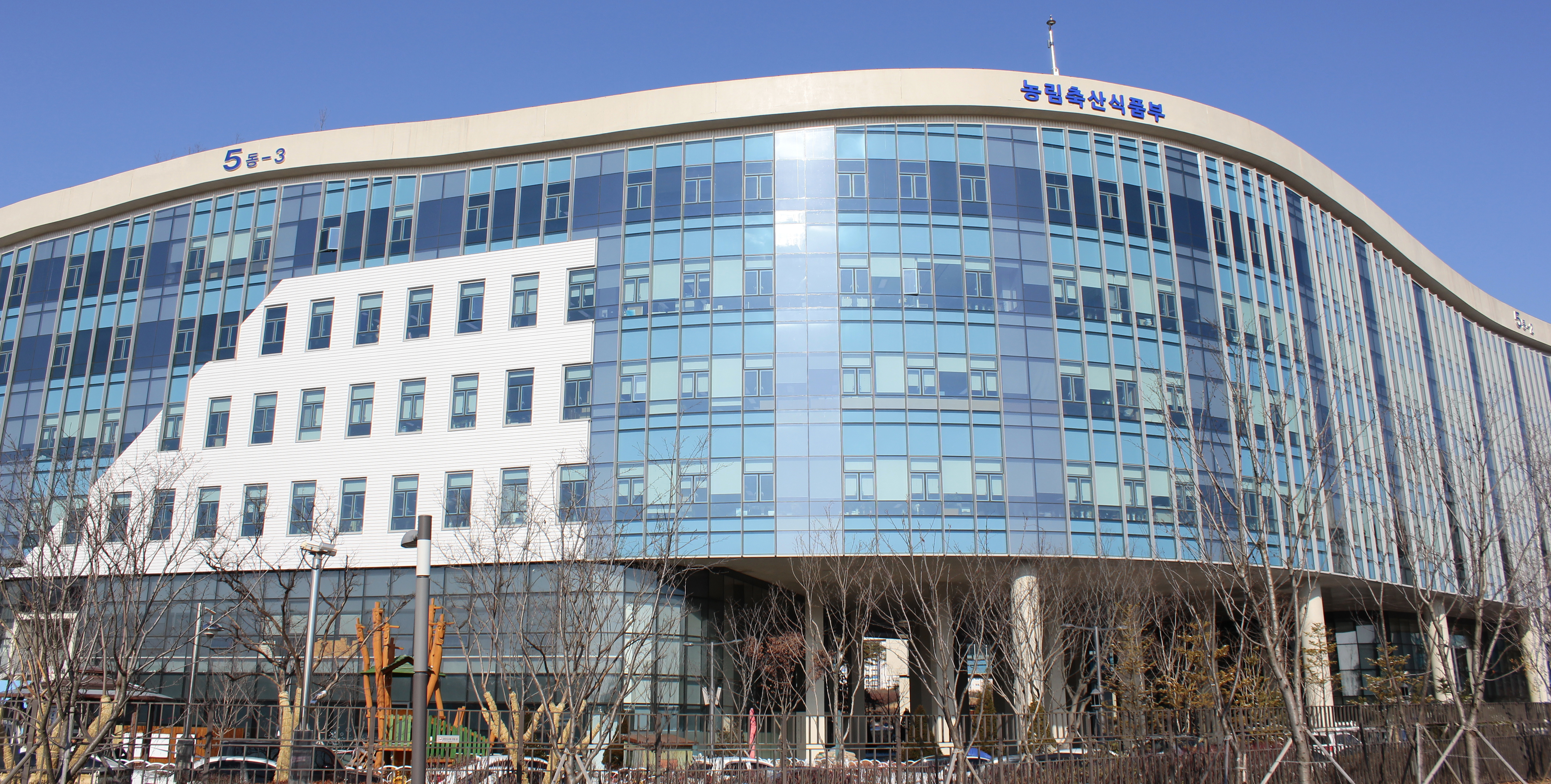
- MAFRA headquarters in Sejong

Agency overview
- Formed: March 23, 2013; 12 years ago
- Preceding agencies: Ministry of Agriculture (1948–1973); Ministry of Agriculture and Fisheries (1973–1987); Ministry of Agriculture, Forestry, and Fisheries (1987–1996); Ministry of Agriculture, Forestry, and Fisheries (1987–1996); Ministry of Agriculture (1996–2008); Ministry for Food, Agriculture, Forestry and Fisheries (2008–2013)
- Jurisdiction: Government of South Korea
- Headquarters: Sejong, South Korea
- Minister responsible: Song Mi-ryung
- Deputy Minister responsible: Park Beom-su
- Child agencies: Rural Development Administration; Korea Forest Service
- Website: Official English Site

Korean name
- Hangul: 농림축산식품부
- Hanja: 農林畜産食品部
- RR: Nongnim chuksan sikpumbu
- MR: Nongnim ch'uksan sikp'umbu

Former Ministry of Agriculture, Food and Rural Affairs logo

The Ministry of Agriculture, Food and Rural Affairs (MAFRA; Korean: 농림축산식품부) is a cabinet-level division of the government of South Korea. It is headquartered in the Sejong Government Complex in Sejong City. It was established as Ministry of Agriculture, with the founding of the First Republic of Korea in 1948.

The MAFRA is responsible for areas including crop insurance, land reclamation, agricultural statistics and the development of agricultural technology including genetically modified crops and environmentally friendly agriculture. It is also responsible for direct payments to rice farmers and for aspects of preparedness for natural disasters.

== Mission ==
- The Ministry of Agriculture, Food and Rural Affairs shall administer affairs related to agriculture, livestock, foods, farmland, and irrigation, promotion of food industry, development of farming communities, and distribution of agricultural products

== History ==
- 7 July 1948: Newly organized the Ministry of Agriculture
- 29 March 1962: Removed the Local Society Bureau and newly organized the Rural Development Administration as an independent organization
- 28 February 1966: Removed the Fisheries Bureau and newly organized the Korea Fisheries Service as an independent organization
- 27 December 1966: Removed the Forestry Bureau and newly organized the Korea Forest Service as an independent organization
- 28 March 1973: Changed the name of the ministry from the Ministry of Agriculture to the Ministry of Agriculture and Fisheries
- 28 January 1974: Organized the Agricultural Statistics Office in each provinces, or Do's under the immediate control of the Minister
- 2 November 1981:
  - Removed the post of the Assistant Deputy Minister of Agriculture and Food
  - Maintained the part of Assistant Deputy Minister of Agricultural Administration; and the Assistant Deputy Minister of Food
- 31 December 1986: Changed the name of the ministry from the Ministry of Agriculture and Fisheries to the Ministry of Agriculture, Forestry, and Fisheries
- 8 August 1996: Changed the name of the ministry from the Ministry of Agriculture, Forestry and Fisheries to the Ministry of Agriculture
- 29 March 2006: FTA-exclusive Free Trade Negotiation Department 2 was newly organized in the International Agriculture Bureau
- 9 February 2007: Return-to-the-Soil Support Department and Livestock Resources Circulation Department were newly organized
- 30 November 2007:
  - Changed the name of institutes:
    - from National Plant Quarantine Center to National Plant Quarantine Service; and
    - from Korea Seed and Variety Center to Korea Seed and Variety Service
  - Changed the name of bureaus:
    - from Investments and Loans Evaluation and Statistics Team to Policy Evaluation and Statistics Bureau
    - from Agricultural Structure Policy Bureau to Agricultural Policy Bureau
    - from Agricultural Circulation Bureau to Agricultural Circulation and Food Industry Bureau; and
    - from Livestock Bureau to Livestock Policy Bureau
- 29 February 2008: Changed the name of the ministry from the Ministry of Agriculture to the Ministry for Food, Agriculture, Forestry and Fisheries
- 12 November 2012:
  - Newly formed the Agricultural Cooperative Marketing and Supply Support Team (a provisional team formed until October 31, 2015)
  - Changed the Four Major Rivers and Saemangeum Development Division to the Saemangeum Development Division
- 23 March 2013:
  - Changed the ministry name from the Ministry for Food, Agriculture, Forestry, and Fisheries to the Ministry of Agriculture, Food, and Rural Affairs.(The Fisheries Division is changed to the Ministry of Oceans and Fisheries and the Food safety Division is transferred to the Ministry of Food and Drug Safety)
  - The Animal, Plant, and Fisheries Quarantine and Inspection Agency is changed to the Animal and Plant Quarantine Agency, and the Training Institute for Food, Agriculture, and Fisheries is changed to the Food and Agriculture Officials Training Institute

== Logo ==
1948~2016

1948~2008

2008~2013

2013~2016

2016~present

== Organization ==
- Organization: one vice minister, one deputy minister, two offices, four bureaus, eight policy bureaus, forty-three divisions (teams and officers) and five institutes
- Quota: 3,237 people (538 people in the head office and 2,699 people in institutes)

=== Minister ===
- Policy Advisor to the Minister

==== Spokesperson ====
- Public Relations Division

=== Vice Minister ===
==== commissioner ====
- Audit and Inspection Officer

==== Planning & Coordination Office ====
===== Policy Planning Bureau =====
- Planning & Statistics Division
- Budget & Evaluation Division
- Administrative Management Division
- Regulation Reform & Legal Affairs Division
- Information Division

==== Rural Policy Bureau ====
- Rural Policy Division
- Business & Human Resource Development Division
- Rural Development Division
- Rural Society Division

==== Agricultural Policy Bureau ====
- Agricultural Policy Division
- Farmland Policy Division
- Agricultural Financial Policy Division
- Farm Income Stabilization Division
- Agricultural Disaster Insurance Team
- Agricultural Cooperative's Marketing & Supply Support Team

===== Food Grain Policy Bureau =====
- Food Grain Policy Division
- Food Grain Industry Division
- Rural Infrastructure Division
- Saemangeum Development Division

==== International Cooperation Bureau ====
- General Division of International Cooperation
- International Development & Cooperation Division
- Agricultural Commerce Division
- Quarantine Policy Division

==== Livestock Policy Bureau ====
- Livestock Policy Division
- Livestock Management Division
- General Division of Animan Health
- Animal Health Management Division

==== Food Industry Policy Office ====
- National Food Cluster Team

===== Food Industry Policy Bureau =====
- Food Industry Policy Division
- Food Industry Promotion Division
- Food Service Industry Division
- Export Promotion Team

===== Marketing Policy Bureau =====
- Marketing Policy Division
- Horticulture Industry Division
- Horticulture Business Division
- Climate Change Response Division

===== Customer & Science Policy Bureau =====
- Customer Policy Division
- Environment-Friendly Agriculture Division
- Science & Technology Policy Division
- Seed & Life Industry Division

== Ministers ==
	Image	Name	Name (Korean)	Took office	Left office	Cabinet
61		Lee Dong-phil	이동필	11 March 2013	5 September 2016	Park Geun-hye
62		Kim Jae-su	김재수	5 September 2016	3 July 2017	Park Geun-hye Moon Jae-in
63		Kim Yung-rok	김영록	3 July 2017	15 March 2018	Park Geun-hye Moon Jae-in
64		Lee Gae-ho	이개호	10 August 2018	30 August 2019	Park Geun-hye Moon Jae-in
65		Kim Hyeon-soo	김현수	31 August 2019	10 May 2022	Yoon Suk Yeol
66		Chung Hwang-keun	정황근	10 May 2022	29 December 2023	Yoon Suk Yeol
67		Song Mi-ryung	송미령	29 December 2023	incumbent	Yoon Suk Yeol Lee Jae Myung

== See also ==
- Agriculture in South Korea
- Government of South Korea
- Korea Forest Service
