= Choe Kwang-shik =

South Korean historian (born 1953)

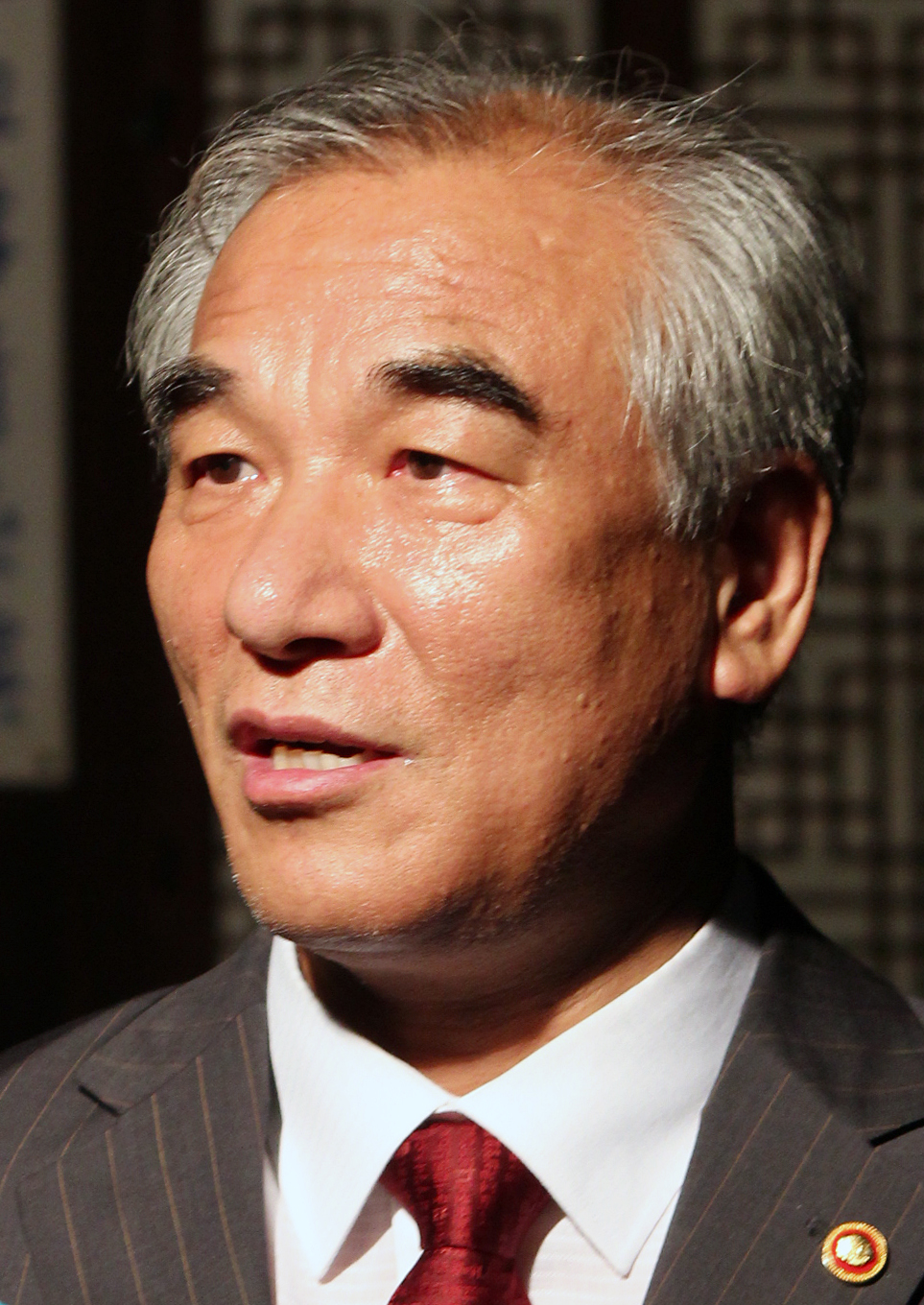
- Born: 1953 (age 72–73)
- Education: Korea University
- Occupations: Historian, museum curator

Korean name
- Hangul: 최광식
- Hanja: 崔光植
- RR: Choe Gwangsik
- MR: Ch'oe Kwangsik

Choe Kwang-shik (Korean: 최광식; born 1953) is a South Korean historian and museum curator who served as the Minister of Culture, Sports and Tourism under President Lee Myung-bak.

== Biography ==
Choe Kwang-shik was born in 1953 in Seoul. He received his PhD in Korean history from Korea University, and in 1995 became a professor of the same university's history department. From 2004 to 2007, he was vice-president of the Korean Association of University Museums (KAUM).

=== Minister of Culture, Sports and Tourism (2009–2013) ===
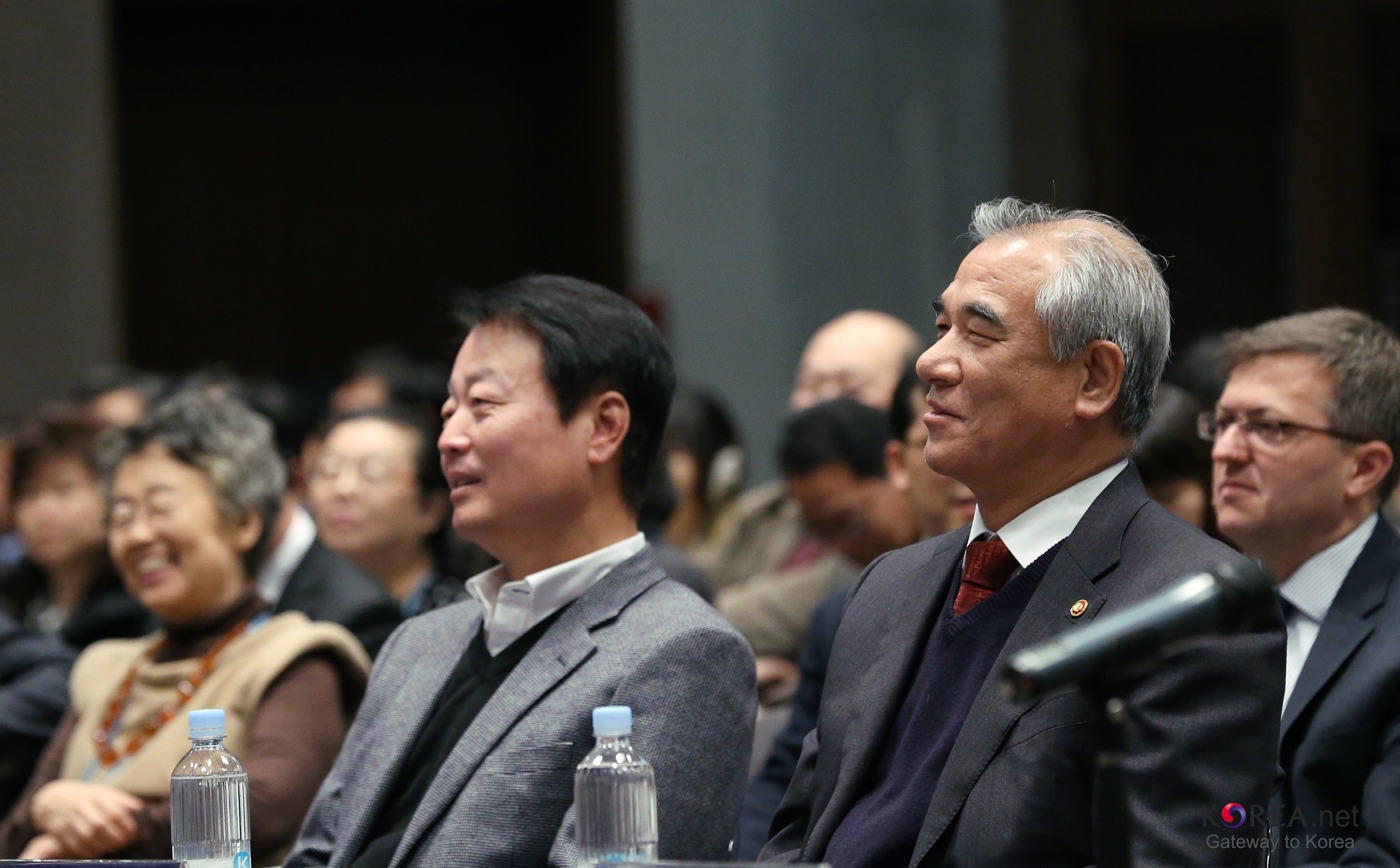
Minister Choe (second from right) in 2012

In 2009, Choe became South Korea's Minister of Culture, Sports and Tourism. In January 2012, he unveiled plans to allocate more funds in cooperation with other governmental organizations to boost South Korea's cultural industry.

In 2013, Choe stepped down from his position as Minister of Culture, with Yoo Jin-ryong taking over.

== Gallery ==
Minister of Culture, Sports and Tourism Choe Kwang-shik

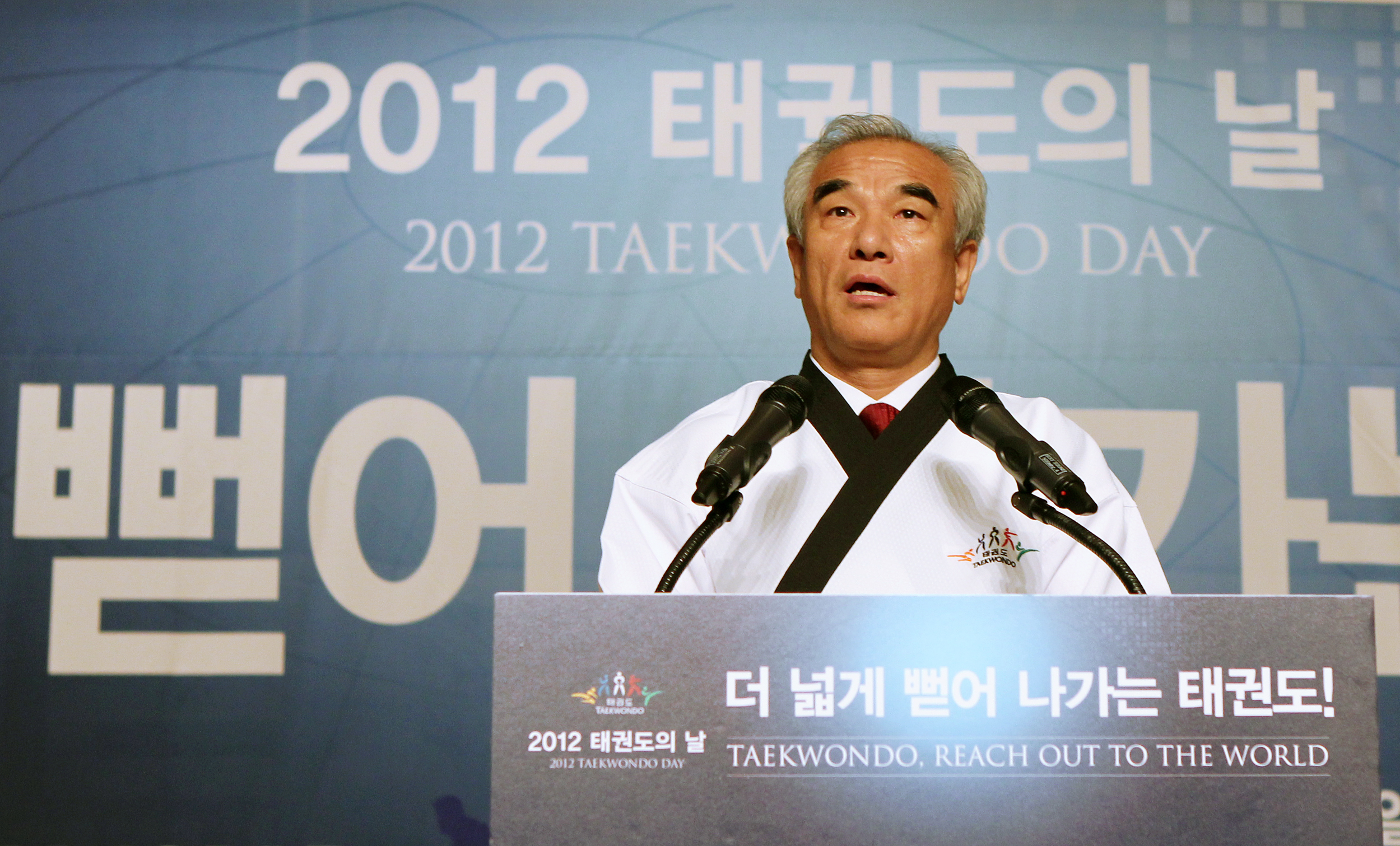
At the Celebration of 2012 Taekwondo Day

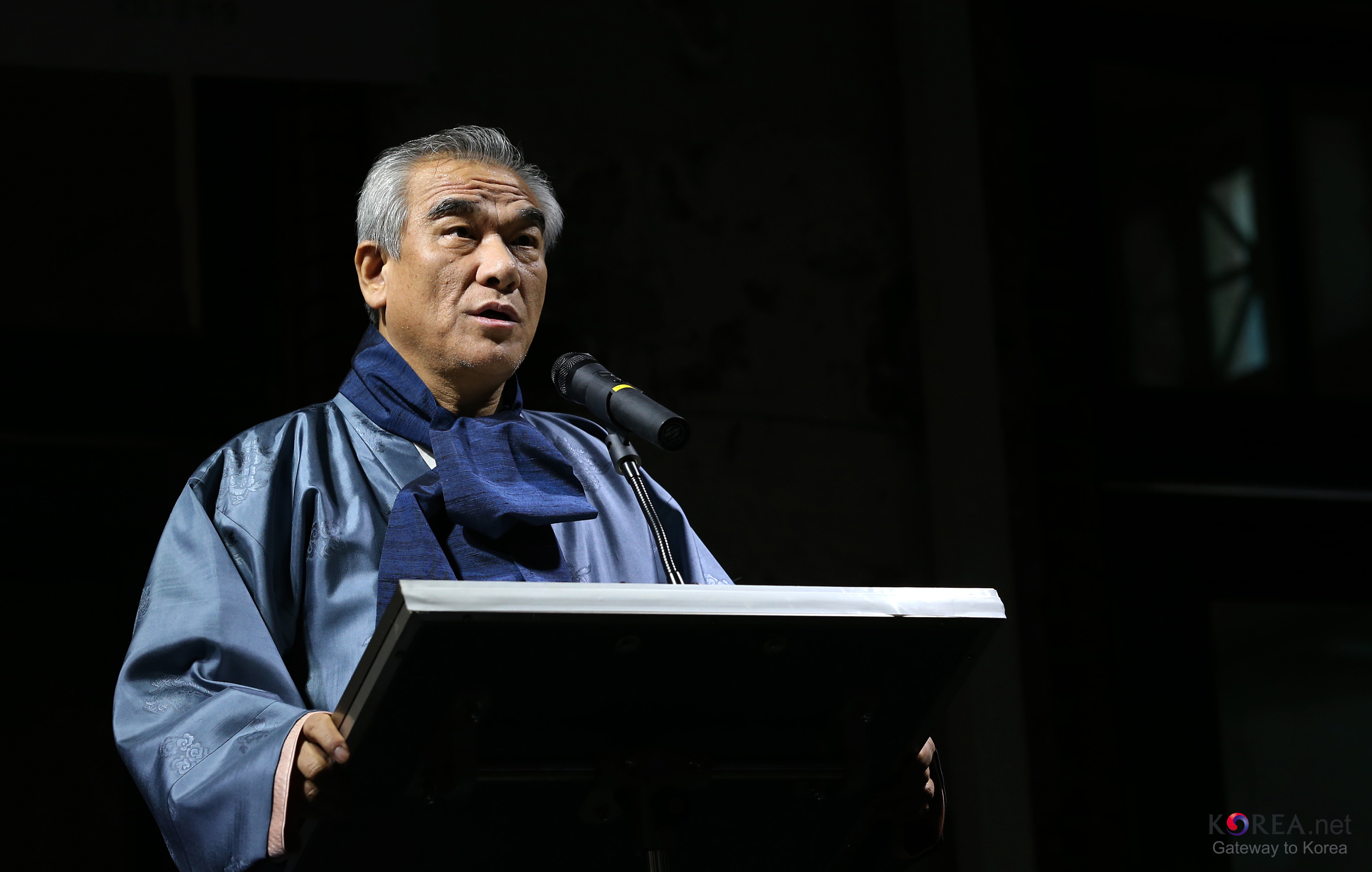
At the 2013 Korea Hanbok Fashion Show

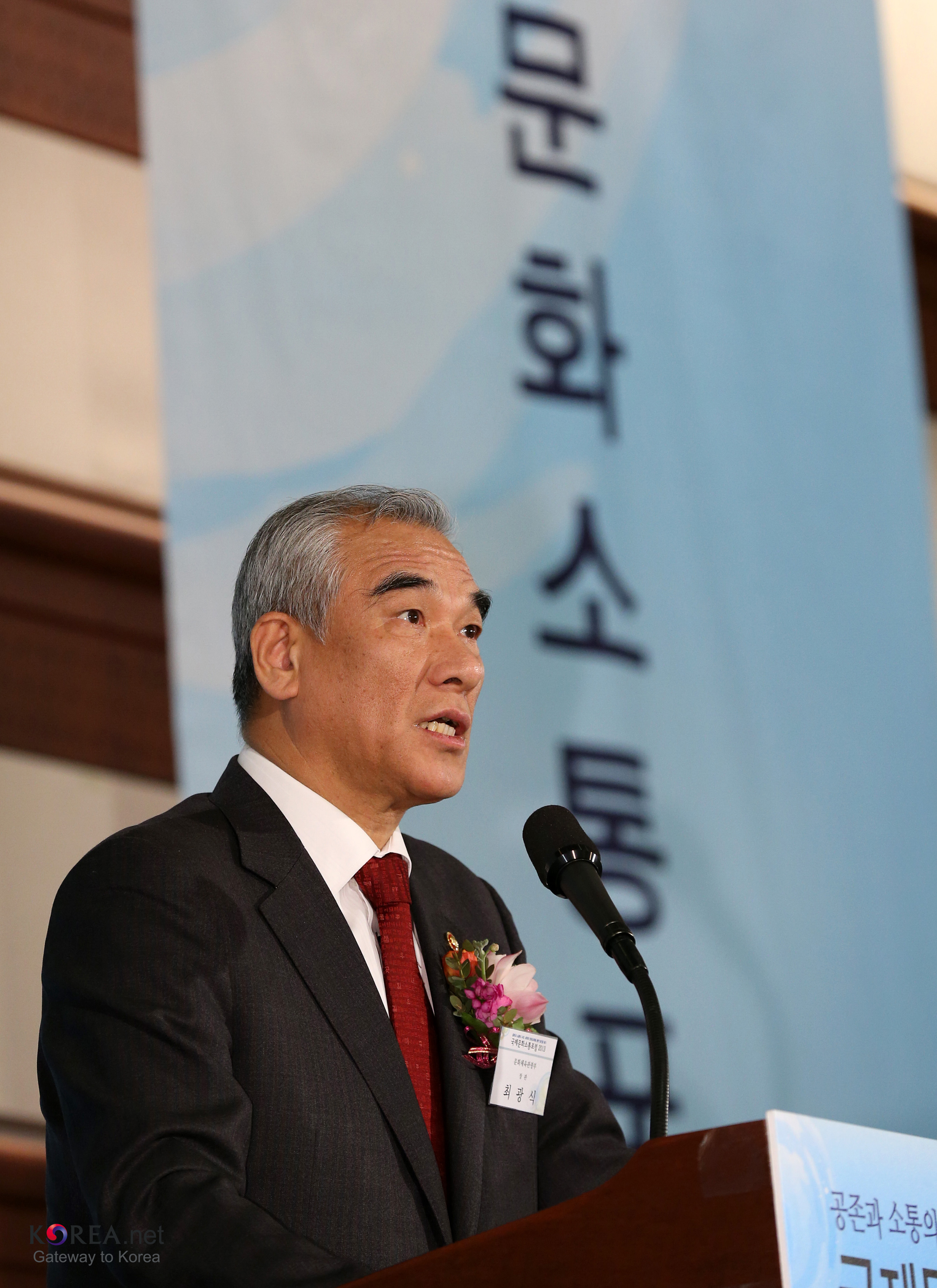
At the International Culture Communications Forum 2013
