= Progressivism in South Korea =

Political ideology and reform movement in South Korea

Progressivism (Korean: 진보주의; Hanja: 進步主義; RR: Jinbojuui) in South Korea is a left-leaning political ideology, broadly associated with social democracy, cultural progressivism, and left-wing nationalism. It advocates for the promotion of social equality and welfare, economic justice, the protection of human rights and minority groups, peace and the reunification of the Korean Peninsula, as well as environmental sustainability.

Modern South Korean progressivism emerged and took shape during the resistance to military dictatorship and became a distinct political movement in the 1990s. As the pro-democracy student activists from the 1970s and 1980s matured into progressive political leadership, their views on society, history, economy, and foreign policy feature prominently in progressive narratives. Domestically, progressives promote economic justice and labor rights in response to the dominance of chaebols in Korean economy, stemming from dirigisme during military dictatorships. Internationally, they take a conciliatory stance toward North Korea and have developed anti-American sentiments, viewing the United States as a supporter of the authoritarian regimes during pro-democracy struggles. The more progressive faction of the movement calls for the withdrawal of the US troops stationed in South Korea.

Historically, there have been communist elements within the progressive movement, but they have been largely powerless in contemporary South Korean politics.

== History ==
=== Labor movement ===
South Korean labor movements have been consistently driven by left-leaning labor organizations since liberation from Japanese colonial rule in 1945. Many of the political prisoners under imperial Japan were leftists and labor activists. Trade unions grew dramatically in liberated Korea, with Chŏnp'yŏng (조선노동조합전국평의회; 朝鮮勞動組合全國評議會; lit. 'General Council of Korea Trade Unions') – a communist-led union – having a membership of 574,475 by late 1945 and nearly a quarter-million by summer of 1946. However, the United States Army Military Government in Korea suppressed worker protests organized by Chŏnp'yŏng, arresting union leaders and forcing railroad workers back to work.

In the 1960s, Park Chung Hee implemented a centrally controlled economy that prioritized the growth of large Korean conglomerates, or chaebols, while maintaining strict control over the working class. In the Peace Market along Cheonggyecheon in downtown Seoul, over 20,000 women labored under inhumane working conditions in garment sweatshops. They worked an average of 15 hours a day, often cramped in spaces just 3 feet high, forcing them to remain seated or bent over for long periods of time. Upon witnessing the cruel workspaces of the workers, Jeon Tae-il engaged in labor activism to no avail and later in 1970 self-immolated in protest, shouting "Workers are human beings, too". Jeon's suicide sparked national interest and galvanized labor-rights movements into the 1970s.

When the citizens of Gwangju rose up against Chun Doo-hwan's dictatorial regime in 1980, the Chun regime responded with brutal military force, killing a still disputed number, estimated to be in the hundreds and sometimes thousands. After the Gwangju Uprising, Chun's regime continued cracking down on labor organizing, removing and blacklisting thousands of activists from union positions. Through all of this, the United States not only did not intervene but also allowed Chun to move key military units – the US-Korean Combined Forces Command – that had been under US jurisdiction.

The South Korean pro-democracy and labor activists, who had largely been pro-American and viewed the United States as a beacon of human rights and liberal democracy, were dismayed by the Carter administration's response and later the Reagan administration's embrace of the Chun regime in 1981. This disillusionment led the South Korean intellectuals to reject pro-US developmentalist neoliberalism, making room for various strands of Marxism to gain popularity. The resulting anti-Americanism fostered the view of South Korea as a US colony and prompted a reevaluation of labor organizing. This gave rise to the Social Formation Debate, centered on identifying the primary revolutionary agent: the working class or the Korean people.

The progressive movement in South Korea emerged from the debate splintered into the PD (민중민주; Minjungminju; lit. 'People's Democracy') faction and NL (민족해방; Minjokhaebang; lit. 'National Liberation') faction. The PD faction prioritized equality, identifying the working class as the principal revolutionary agent and focusing on labor movements to challenge the dominance and monopoly of large corporations in Korea and fight for labor rights in Korea. In contrast, the NL faction adopted a left-wing nationalistic approach and viewed the ethnic Korean people – both in the North and the South – to be the principal revolutionary agent, arguing that Korean people should unite to resist American imperialism. The NL faction also tends to wage culture wars with conservatives over leftist Korean independence figures among other issues. The NL faction is also deemed as being pro-North Korea and pro-communist by conservatives.

The PD faction grew into a Western-style leftist party, influenced by modern liberalism and social democracy, while NL was a left-wing nationalist party that mixes ethnic nationalism, reunificationism and social progressivism. PD and NL are political terms that refer to the two pillars of South Korea's progressive camp and are still frequently used today. As of now, the representative PD-affiliated progressive party is the Justice Party, and the representative NL-affiliated progressive party is the Progressive Party.

=== Shinjwapa ===
After the collapse of the Soviet Union in the 1990s, the New Left movement in Europe and the United States and postmodernist discourse became known, creating a Sinjwapa (신좌파; 新左派; lit. 'New Left faction') in South Korea. They advocate youth rights, LGBT rights and feminism. Currently, South Korea's representative Sinjwapa parties include the Green Party and Basic Income Party.

== Progressive parties ==
=== Gujwapa (Old Left) ===
==== Communist or far-left socialist ====
- Workers' Party of South Korea (1946–1949; banned)
- Anti-Imperialist National Democratic Front → National Democratic Front of South Korea → Anti-Imperialist National Democratic Front (1969–; banned)
- Socialist Revolutionary Workers' Party → Labor Party (2016–2022; unregistered; merged)
- People's Democracy Party (2016–)

==== Hyeoksingye (Innovation-faction) ====
- Preparatory Committee for National Construction → People's Party of Korea → People's Labor Party (1945–1950)
- Socialist Party (1951–1953)
- Progressive Party (1956–1958; banned)
- United Socialist Party of Korea (1961–1967; banned 1961–1966)

==== Minjungminju (PD) ====
- The People's Party (1990–1992)
- People's Victory 21 → Democratic Labor Party (1997–2011)
- Youth Progressive Party → Socialist Party → Hope Socialist Party → Korea Socialist Party → Socialist Party (1998–2012)
- New Progressive Party (2008–2012)
- Unified Progressive Party (2011–2012)
- Progressive Justice Party → Justice Party (2012–) - However, there are a few Minjokhaebang and Shinjwapa factions in the Justice Party.
  - Green-Justice Party (2024)
  - Korean Democratic Labor Party (2025)
- Labor Party (2013–)
- Socialist Revolutionary Workers' Party → Labor Party (2016–2022; unregistered; merged)

==== Minjokhaebang (NL) ====
- People's Victory 21 → Democratic Labor Party (1997–2011)
- Unified Progressive Party (2011–2014; banned)
- People's United Party (2016–2017)
- New People's Party (2017)
- Minjung Party → Progressive Party (2017–)

=== Shinjwapa (New Left) ===
- Green Social Democrats (2004)
  - Green Peace Party (2002–2004)
  - Social Democratic Party of Korea (2002–2004)
- Green Party Korea (2012–)
- Future Party (2017–)
- Basic Income Party (2020-)
  - New Progressive Alliance (2024)
- Social Democratic Party (2024-)

=== Progressive-liberal ===
- Democratic Independent Party (1947–1948) (Note: In North Korea, this party existed until the 1960s.)
- Progressive Party (1956–1958)
- People's Party (1988)
- Hankyoreh Democratic Party (1988–1991)
- Popular Party (1989–1992)
- Participation Party (2010–2011)
- Unified Progressive Party (2011–2012, factions)
- Youth Party (2012)
- Justice Party (2012–)

- Peace and Justice (2018)

- Future Party (2017–)
- Basic Income Party (2020–)
- Let's Go! Environmental Party (2020–)
- Democratic Alliance of Korea (2024; satellite of the liberal DPK, the NPA and the Progressive Party)

== Progressive media ==
- OhmyNews – liberal-leaning bias
- Pressian – progressive
- Voice of the People – progressive, resistance nationalism
- The Women's News – feminism

== Progressive personalities ==
- Bong Joon-ho
- Ha-Joon Chang
- Han Sang-gyun
- Hong Sehwa
- Hong Seok-cheon
- Jang Hye-young
- Jeon Tae-il
- Kim Yeo-jin
- Kwon In-sook
- Lim Su-kyung
- Lee Hyori
- Lim ji-hyeon
- Lee Yeong-hui
- Lyuh Woon-hyung
- Moon Ik-hwan
- Park Chan-wook
- Rhyu Si-min
- Roh Hoe-chan
- Roh Su-hui
- Ryu Ho-jeong
- Pak Noja
- Shin Hae-chul
- Sim Sang-jung
- Yun Hyon-seok

== Major progressive parties election results of South Korea ==
=== Presidential elections ===
Election	Candidate	Total votes	Share of votes	Outcome	Party name
1952	Cho Pong-am	797,504	11.4%	Defeated ✗	Independent
1956	Cho Pong-am	2,163,808	30.0%	Defeated ✗	Independent
1987	Baik Ki-wan	Quit midway through			Independent
1992	Baik Ki-wan	238,648	1.0%	Defeated ✗	Independent
1997	Kwon Young-ghil	306,026	1.2%	Defeated ✗	People's Victory 21
2002	Kwon Young-ghil	957,148	3.9%	Defeated ✗	Democratic Labor Party
2007	Kwon Young-ghil	712,121	3.0%	Defeated ✗	Democratic Labor Party
2007	Geum Min	18,223	0.07%	Defeated ✗	Korea Socialist Party
2012	Lee Jung-hee	Quit midway through			Unified Progressive Party
2012	Kim So-yeon	16,687	0.05%	Defeated ✗	Independent
2012	Kim Soon-ja	46,017	0.15%	Defeated ✗	Independent
2017	Sim Sang-jung	2,017,458	6.17%	Defeated ✗	Justice Party
2017	Kim Sun-dong	27,229	0.08%	Defeated ✗	People's United Party
2022	Sim Sang-jung	803,358	2.38%	Defeated ✗	Justice Party
2022	Kim Jae-yeon	37,366	0.11%	Defeated ✗	Progressive Party
2022	Oh Jun-ho	18,105	0.05%	Defeated ✗	Basic Income Party
2022	Lee Baek-yun	9,176	0.03%	Defeated ✗	Labor Party
2025	Kwon Yeong-guk	344,150	0.98%	Defeated ✗	Democratic Labor Party

=== Legislative elections ===
Election	Total seats	Total votes	Share of votes	Outcome	Election leader	Party name
1950	2 / 210	89,413	1.3%	new 2 seats; minority	Jo So-ang	Socialist Party
1960	4 / 233	541,021	6.0%	new 4 seats; minority	Seo Sang-il	Social Mass Party
1960	1 / 233	57,965	0.6%	new 1 seats; minority	Jeon Jin-han	Korea Socialist Party
1967	1 / 175	249,561	2.3%	new 1 seats; minority	Seo Min-ho	Mass Party
1967	0 / 175	104,975	1.0%	new 0 seats; minority	Kim Cheol	Unified Socialist Party
1971	0 / 204	59,359	0.5%	▼1 seats; minority	Ri Mong	Mass Party
1971	0 / 204	97,398	0.9%	0 seats; minority	Kim Cheol	Unified Socialist Party
1981	0 / 276	676,921	4.2%	new 2 seats; minority		New Politics Party
1981	2 / 276	524,361	3.2%	new 2 seats; minority	Ko Chong-hun	Democratic Socialist Party
1981	0 / 276	122,778	0.7%	new 0 seats; minority	Kim Cheol	Socialist Party
1985	1 / 276	288,863	1.4%	new 1 seats; minority	Ko Chong-hun	New Politics Socialist Party
1988	0 / 299	65,650	0.3%	new 0 seats; minority	Jeong Tae-yun	Party of the people
1988	1 / 299	251,236	1.3%	new 0 seats; minority	Ye Chun-ho	Hankyoreh Democratic Party
1988	1 / 299	3,267	0.0%	new 0 seats; minority		Unificational Socialist Party
1992	0 / 229	319,041	1.5%	new 0 seats; minority	Lee U-jae	People's Party
2000	0 / 273	223,261	1.2%	new 0 seats; minority	Kwon Young-ghil	Democratic Labor Party
2000	0 / 273	125,082	0.7%	new 0 seats; minority	Choi Hyeok	Youth Progressive Party
2004	10 / 299	2,774,061	13.0%	▲10 seats; minority	Kwon Young-ghil	Democratic Labor Party
2004	0 / 299	47,311	0.22%	0 seats; minority	Won Yong-su	Socialist Party
2008	5 / 299	973,445	5.68%	▼5 seats; minority	Cheon Yeong-se	Democratic Labor Party
2008	0 / 299	504,466	2.94%	new 0 seats; minority	Roh Hoe-chan; Sim Sang-jung	New Progressive Party
2008	0 / 299	35,496	0.20%	0 seats; minority	Choi Gwang-Eun	Korea Socialist Party
2012	13 / 300	2,198,405	10.3%	new 13 seats; minority	Lee Jung-hee	Unified Progressive Party
2012	0 / 300	243,065	1.13%	0 seats; minority	Hong Sehwa; An Hyo-sang	New Progressive Party
2016	0 / 300	91,705	0.38%	0 seats; minority	Koo Kyo-hyun	Labor Party
2016	6 / 300	1,719,891	7.23%	new 6 seats; minority	Sim Sang-jung	Justice Party
2016	0 / 300	145,624	0.61%	0 seats; minority	Lee Gwang-seok	People's United Party
2020	6 / 300	2,697,956	9.7%	6 seats; minority	Sim Sang-jung	Justice Party
2020	0 / 300	295,612	1.06%	new 0 seats; minority	Kim Jong-hoon	Minjung Party
2020	0 / 300	34,272	0.12%	0 seats; minority	Koo Kyo-hyun	Labor Party
2024	0 / 300	609,313	2.1%	▼6 seats; minority	Sim Sang-jung	Green–Justice Party
2024	0 / 300	25,937	0.09%	0 seats; minority	Na Do-won	Labor Party

=== Local elections ===
Election	Metropolitan mayor/Governor	Provincial legislature	Municipal mayor	Municipal legislature	Party name
3rd (2002)	0 / 16	11 / 682	2 / 232	N/A	Democratic Labor Party
4th (2006)	0 / 16	15 / 733	0 / 230	66 / 2,888	Democratic Labor Party
5th (2010)	0 / 16	24 / 761	3 / 228	115 / 2,888	Democratic Labor Party
5th (2010)	0 / 16	3 / 761	0 / 228	22 / 2,888	New Progressive Party
6th (2014)	0 / 17	3 / 789	0 / 226	34 / 2,898	Unified Progressive Party
6th (2014)	0 / 17	1 / 789	0 / 226	6 / 2,898	Labor Party
6th (2014)	0 / 17	0 / 789	0 / 226	11 / 2,898	Justice Party
7th (2018)	0 / 17	11 / 824	0 / 226	26 / 2,927	Justice Party
7th (2018)	0 / 17	0 / 824	0 / 226	11 / 2,927	Minjung Party
8th (2022)	0 / 17	3 / 872	1 / 226	17 / 2,987	Progressive Party
8th (2022)	0 / 17	2 / 872	0 / 226	7 / 2,987	Justice Party
9th (2026)	0 / 16	7 / 933	0 / 227	34 / 3,034	Progressive Party
9th (2026)	0 / 16	0 / 933	0 / 227	6 / 3,034	Justice Party
9th (2026)	0 / 16	0 / 933	0 / 227	1 / 3,034	Green Party Korea

== See also ==
- Conservatism in South Korea
- Feminism in South Korea
- Hanchongnyon
- Identity politics – One of the main factors in distinguishing between the liberal and progressive camps in South Korea. (Those who support identity politics are classified as progressives.)
- Left-wing nationalism in South Korea
  - Juchesasangpa (far-left)
- Liberalism in South Korea
  - Progressive-liberalism
- LGBT rights in South Korea
- List of political parties in South Korea
- Socialism
  - Democratic socialism (left-wing)
  - Social democracy (centre-left to left-wing)
  - South Korean Socialist Workers' Alliance
- Undongkwon
