= Kim Jong-cheol (politician) =

South Korean politician (born 1970)

- 김종철

Leader of the Justice Party
- In office 9 October 2020 – 25 January 2021
- Preceded by: Sim Sang-jung
- Succeeded by: Kim Yun-ki (acting); Kang Eun-mi (ERC); Yeo Yeong-gug

Acting leader of the Labor Party
- In office 29 October 2012 – 1 February 2013
- Preceded by: Hong Sehwa; Ahn Hyo-sang
- Succeeded by: Lee Yong-gill

Personal details
- Born: July 8, 1970 (age 56)
- Party: Independent
- Other political affiliations: Construction National Victory 21 (1999); Democratic Labor Party (2000–2008); New Progressive Party (2008–2012); Labor Party (2012–2015); Progressive Gathering+ (2015); Justice Party (2015–2021)

Kim Jong-cheol (Korean: 김종철, born October 15, 1970) is a South Korean politician. He served as the leader of the Justice Party.

== Education ==
- 1990: Earned a degree in Economics, Seoul National University.

== History ==
From 2001 until 2003, he served as chairperson of the Yongsan District Committee of the Democratic Labor Party.

In 2004, he served as a spokesperson and in 2005 a Supreme Council Member of the Democratic Labor Party.

In 2005, he served as director of the Central Training Institute of the Democratic Labor Party.

He later served as chairperson of the Dongjak District Party Committee for the New Progressive Party.

In 2011, he served as a spokesperson for the New Progressive Party.

During the 2011 Seoul Mayoral by-election, he served as co-chair of the Dongjak District election campaign committee.

In November 2011, he served as vice-leader of the New Progressive Party.

He later served as chairman of the Dongjak district party committee of the Labor Party.

In 2016, he was elected a co-chair of the Seoul City Party of the Justice Party.

He later served as co-chairperson of the Dongjak Committee of the Justice Party.

In 2016, he became the chief of staff to Justice Party floor leader Roh Hoe-chan. He later served as the chief of staff to floor leader Yoon So-ha.

He served as the campaign committee spokesperson for the Justice Party in the 2020 South Korean legislative election.

In 2020, he served as a senior spokesperson for the Justice Party.

He became leader of the Justice Party in 2020. However, he committed sexual harassment against Jang Hye-young, a Justice Party lawmaker at the time, and he resigned from his position on 25 January 2021 and was expelled from the Justice Party on 28 January.

== Electoral history ==
Year	Election	Assembly	Office	Constituency	Party	Votes	Vote share	Rank	Result	Notes
2002	Local election	3rd	District councillor	Yongsan-gu, Seoul	Democratic Labor Party	8,406	9.55%	3rd	Lost	
2006	Local election	4th	Mayor	Seoul	Democratic Labor Party	117,421	2.97%	4th	Lost	
2008	General election	18th	Member of the National Assembly	Dongjak B, Seoul	New Progressive Party	1,758	2.01%	3rd	Lost	
2012	General election	19th	Member of the National Assembly	Dongjak B, Seoul	New Progressive Party	4,708	5.14%	3rd	Lost	
2014	By-election	19th	Member of the National Assembly	Dongjak B, Seoul	Labor Party	1,076	1.40%	3rd	Lost	
2016	General election	20th	Member of the National Assembly	Dongjak B, Seoul	Justice Party	10%	—	—	Withdrew	
2020	General election	21st	Member of the National Assembly	Proportional representation	Justice Party	2,697,958	9.67%	16th	None	Proportional representation
