= Eunpyeong B =

Constituency in Seoul, South Korea

- Single-member constituency for the National Assembly
- Location of the constituency
- District(s): Eunpyeong District (part)
- Region: Seoul
- Electorate: 195,270 (2024)

Current constituency
- Created: 1988
- Seats: 1
- Party: Democratic Party
- Member: Kim Woo-young
- Created from: Seodaemun–Eunpyeong

Eunpyeong B (Korean: 은평구 을) is a constituency of the National Assembly of South Korea. The constituency consists of parts of Eunpyeong District, Seoul. As of 2024, 195,270 eligible voters were registered in the constituency. The constituency was created in 1988 from the Seodaemun–Eunpyeong constituency.

== History ==
Throughout its history, Eunpyeong B has elected members of liberal, centrist, and conservative political parties to represent the constituency. Despite conservative politician Lee Jae-oh being elected a total of five times in Eunpyeong B, in recent years, the liberal Democratic Party has been dominant in the constituency.

Deputy Speaker of the National Assembly Kim Jae-kwang of the centre-right Reunification Democratic Party was the first member to represent the constituency. He was succeeded by Lee Won-hyung of the centre-left Democratic Party who won in the 1992 election. Lee Jae-oh made his debut in this election as the left-wing Popular Party candidate. Lee Jae-oh won the following election held in 1996 as a member of the centre-right New Korea Party, defeating incumbent Lee Won-hyung by over eight points. Lee comfortably won re-election in 2000 with 51% of the vote and narrowly won re-election in 2004 with 45.25% of the vote against Uri Party candidate Song Mi-hwa who received 43.07% of the vote. However, Lee was defeated by Moon Kook-hyun of the centrist reformist Creative Korea Party by a margin of over eleven points.

On October 22, 2009, Moon Kook-hyun lost his seat after he was found guilty of violating South Korean election law; specifically the political funds act. Accordingly, a by-election for the constituency was held in 2010 which saw the constituency's former member Lee Jae-oh of the conservative Grand National Party win in a landslide, securing 58.33% of the vote. In the 2012 election, Lee narrowly won re-election by a margin 1.14% against unified opposition candidate Cheon Ho-sun of the centre-left Unified Progressive Party.

Ahead of the 2016 South Korean election, incumbent Lee Jae-oh was not re-nominated as the Saenuri Party's candidate for Eunpyeong B. This move came as the Saenuri Party's pro-Park Geun-hye faction grew influential within the party and denied renomination for many party members considered to be anti-Park or pro-Lee Myung-bak. In response to this, Lee left the Saenuri Party on March 23, 2016, and announced his intention to run as an independent candidate on the following day. The Saenuri Party decided not to nominate a candidate in the Eunpyeong B constituency on March 28, 2016. Despite this, Lee Jae-oh failed to win re-election, being defeated by Kang Byung-won of the liberal Democratic Party who won with 36.74% of the vote. Kang won re-election in 2020, garnering 57.41% of the vote. Kang was not re-nominated as the Democratic Party's candidate ahead of the 2024 election after being defeated by Kim Woo-young in a party primary. Kim won the general election with 56.95% of the vote, defeating People Power Party challenger Chang Seong-ho by a wide margin.

== Boundaries ==
The constituency encompasses the neighborhoods of Gusan-dong, Daejo-dong, Jingwan-dong, Bulgwang-dong, and Galhyeon-dong. The constituency is bordered Goyang B to the north and west, Eunpyeong A to the south, and Jongno to the east.

== List of members of the National Assembly ==
| Election | Member | Party | Dates | Notes |
|---|---|---|---|---|
| 1988 | Kim Jae-kwang | Reunification Democratic | 1988–1992 | Deputy Speaker of the National Assembly (1988–1992) |
| 1992 | Lee Won-hyung | Democratic | 1992–1996 | Chairperson of the Anti-Corruption and Civil Rights Commission (2001–2004) |
| 1996 | Lee Jae-oh | New Korea | 1996–2008 | Floor leader of the Grand National Party (2001–2002, 2006); Secretary General of the Grand National Party (2003) |
| 2000 | Lee Jae-oh | Grand National | 1996–2008 | Floor leader of the Grand National Party (2001–2002, 2006); Secretary General of the Grand National Party (2003) |
| 2004 | Lee Jae-oh | Grand National | 1996–2008 | Floor leader of the Grand National Party (2001–2002, 2006); Secretary General of the Grand National Party (2003) |
| 2008 | Moon Kook-hyun | Creative Korea | 2008–2009 | Lost seat on October 22, 2009, for violating South Korean election law (political funds act) |
| 2010 by-election | Lee Jae-oh | Grand National | 2010–2016 | Chairperson of the Anti-Corruption and Civil Rights Commission (2009–2010) Minister for Special Affairs (2010–2011) Left the Saenuri Party on March 23, 2016 |
| 2012 | Lee Jae-oh | Saenuri (Note: Independent from March 23, 2016) | 2010–2016 | Chairperson of the Anti-Corruption and Civil Rights Commission (2009–2010) Minister for Special Affairs (2010–2011) Left the Saenuri Party on March 23, 2016 |
| 2016 | Kang Byung-won | Democratic | 2016–2024 | Secretary of the Office of the President (2003–2008) |
| 2020 | Kang Byung-won | Democratic | 2016–2024 | Secretary of the Office of the President (2003–2008) |
| 2024 | Kim Woo-young | Democratic | 2024–present | Mayor of Eunpyeong (2010–2018); Secretary for Institution Reform (2018–2019); Secretary for Autonomy Expansion (2019); Deputy Mayor for Political Affairs Seoul (2020–2021) |

== Election results ==
=== 2024 ===
Legislative Election 2024: Eunpyeong B
| Party | Candidate | Votes | % | ±% |
|---|---|---|---|---|
| Democratic | Kim Woo-young | 74,211 | 56.95 | ▼0.46 |
| People Power | Chang Seong-ho | 51,612 | 39.60 | ▲3.36 |
| Green Justice | Kim Jong-min | 4,478 | 3.43 | ▼1.03 |
| Rejected ballots | | 2,028 | – | |
| Turnout | | 132,329 | 67.77 | ▲1.6 |
| Registered electors | | 195,270 | | |
| Democratic hold | | Swing | | |

=== 2020 ===
Legislative Election 2020: Eunpyeong B
| Party | Candidate | Votes | % | ±% |
|---|---|---|---|---|
| Democratic | Kang Byung-won | 78,997 | 57.41 | ▲20.67 |
| United Future | Heo Yong-seok | 49,796 | 36.24 | new |
| Justice | Kim Jong-min | 6,127 | 4.46 | new |
| Basic Income | Shin Min-ju | 2,600 | 1.89 | new |
| Rejected ballots | | 1,625 | – | |
| Turnout | | 139,045 | 66.17 | ▲8.09 |
| Registered electors | | 210,129 | | |
| Democratic hold | | Swing | | |

=== 2016 ===
Legislative Election 2016: Eunpyeong B
| Party | Candidate | Votes | % | ±% |
|---|---|---|---|---|
| Democratic | Kang Byung-won | 42,704 | 36.74 | new |
| Independent | Lee Jae-oh | 34,318 | 29.52 | ▼19.99 |
| People | Ko Yeon-ho | 31,923 | 27.46 | new |
| Independent | Choi Byung-ho | 5,272 | 4.53 | new |
| Minjoo | Lee Kang-mu | 1,337 | 1.15 | new |
| People's United | Yoo Ji-hoon | 670 | 0.57 | new |
| Rejected ballots | | 3,678 | – | |
| Turnout | | 119,902 | 58.08 | ▲2.83 |
| Registered electors | | 206,434 | | |
| Democratic gain from Independent | | Swing | | |

=== 2012 ===
Legislative Election 2012: Eunpyeong B
| Party | Candidate | Votes | % | ±% |
|---|---|---|---|---|
| Saenuri | Lee Jae-oh | 63,238 | 49.51 | ▼8.82 |
| Unified Progressive | Cheon Ho-sun (Note: Unified opposition candidate with the Democratic United Party) | 61,779 | 48.37 | new |
| Real Democratic | Lee Mun-yong | 2,692 | 2.10 | new |
| Rejected ballots | | 994 | – | |
| Turnout | | 128,703 | 55.25 | ▲14.78 |
| Registered electors | | 232,939 | | |
| Saenuri hold | | Swing | | |

=== 2010 (by-election) ===
2010 by-election: Eunpyeong B
| Party | Candidate | Votes | % | ±% |
|---|---|---|---|---|
| Grand National | Lee Jae-oh | 48,311 | 58.33 | ▲17.52 |
| Democratic | Chang Sang | 33,048 | 39.90 | |
| Creative Korea | Gong Seong-gyeong | 901 | 1.08 | ▼50.94 |
| Socialist | Geum Min | 458 | 0.55 | new |
| Reunification | Ahn Woong-hyun | 96 | 0.11 | new |
| Rejected ballots | | 1,199 | – | |
| Turnout | | 84,013 | 40.47 | ▼12.03 |
| Registered electors | | 207,585 | | |
| Grand National gain from Grand National | | Swing | | |

=== 2008 ===
Legislative Election 2008: Eunpyeong B
| Party | Candidate | Votes | % | ±% |
|---|---|---|---|---|
| Creative Korea | Moon Kook-hyun | 48,656 | 52.02 | new |
| Grand National | Lee Jae-oh | 38,164 | 40.81 | ▼4.44 |
| United Democratic | Song Mi-hwa | 5,397 | 5.77 | new |
| Liberty Forward | Chung Doo-hyung | 871 | 0.93 | new |
| Family Party for Peace and Unity | Eom Yoon-hyung | 428 | 0.45 | new |
| Rejected ballots | | 2,101 | – | |
| Turnout | | 95,617 | 52.5 | ▼8.18 |
| Registered electors | | 186,121 | | |
| Creative Korea gain from Grand National | | Swing | | |

=== 2004 ===
Legislative Election 2004: Eunpyeong B
| Party | Candidate | Votes | % | ±% |
|---|---|---|---|---|
| Grand National | Lee Jae-oh | 53,107 | 45.25 | ▼5.75 |
| Uri | Song Mi-hwa | 50,566 | 43.08 | new |
| Millennium Democratic | Lee Sung-il | 6,064 | 5.16 | ▼36.66 |
| Democratic Labor | Chung Tae-yeon | 4,957 | 4.22 | new |
| United Liberal Democrats | Lim Wang-hyuk | 1,036 | 0.88 | ▼1.69 |
| Independent | Lee Yong-jun | 774 | 3.45 | new |
| Korean Christian | Min Seung | 627 | 0.53 | new |
| Democratic Republican | Kim Myung-hwan | 232 | 0.19 | new |
| Rejected ballots | | 843 | – | |
| Turnout | | 118,206 | 60.68 | ▲4.5 |
| Registered electors | | 194,786 | | |
| Grand National hold | | Swing | | |

=== 2000 ===
Legislative Election 2000: Eunpyeong B
| Party | Candidate | Votes | % | ±% |
|---|---|---|---|---|
| Grand National | Lee Jae-oh | 53,121 | 51.00 | ▲7.37 |
| Millennium Democratic | Lee Suk-hyung | 43,555 | 41.82 | new |
| Youth Progressive | Lee Eun-young | 3,715 | 3.56 | new |
| United Liberal Democrats | Kim Mun-kyum | 2,684 | 2.57 | ▼7.56 |
| Independent | Kim Myung-hwan | 1,070 | 1.02 | new |
| Rejected ballots | | 824 | – | |
| Turnout | | 104,969 | 56.18 | ▼2.97 |
| Registered electors | | 186,860 | | |
| Grand National hold | | Swing | | |

=== 1996 ===
Legislative Election 1996: Eunpyeong B
| Party | Candidate | Votes | % | ±% |
|---|---|---|---|---|
| New Korea | Lee Jae-oh | 48,146 | 43.63 | ▲14.3 |
| National Congress | Lee Won-hyung | 39,132 | 35.46 | new |
| United Liberal Democrats | Noh Yang-hak | 11,180 | 10.13 | new |
| Democratic | Lee Jang-hee | 9,785 | 8.86 | new |
| Non-Partisan National Association | Kim Myung-hwan | 2,106 | 1.90 | new |
| Rejected ballots | | 1,653 | – | |
| Turnout | | 112,002 | 59.15 | ▼10.07 |
| Registered electors | | 189,342 | | |
| New Korea gain from National Congress | | Swing | | |

=== 1992 ===
Legislative Election 1992: Eunpyeong B
| Party | Candidate | Votes | % | ±% |
|---|---|---|---|---|
| Democratic | Lee Won-hyung | 40,806 | 32.74 | new |
| Democratic Liberal | Park Wan-il | 36,547 | 29.33 | new |
| Unification National | Noh Yang-hak | 22,506 | 18.06 | new |
| Popular | Lee Jae-oh | 21,716 | 17.42 | new |
| New Political Reform | Kim Jin-taek | 3,026 | 2.42 | new |
| Rejected ballots | | 1,408 | – | |
| Turnout | | 126,009 | 69.22 | ▲0.8 |
| Registered electors | | 182,048 | | |
| Democratic gain from Democratic Liberal | | Swing | | |

=== 1988 ===
Legislative Election 1988: Eunpyeong B
| Party | Candidate | Votes | % | ±% |
|---|---|---|---|---|
| Reunification Democratic | Kim Jae-kwang | 27,154 | 26.13 | – |
| Democratic Justice | Park Wan-il | 26,814 | 25.80 | – |
| Peace Democratic | Lee Won-hyung | 26,612 | 25.61 | – |
| New Democratic Republican | Lim In-chae | 13,619 | 13.10 | – |
| Hankyoreh Democratic | Lee Hyun-bae | 9,700 | 9.33 | – |
| Rejected ballots | | 834 | – | |
| Turnout | | 104,733 | 68.42 | – |
| Registered electors | | 153,073 | | |
| Reunification Democratic win (new seat) | | | | |

== See also ==
- List of constituencies of the National Assembly of South Korea
