= Shin Ji-hye =

South Korean politician (born 1987)

- 신지혜

Leader of the Basic Income Party
- In office 9 June 2020 – 4 June 2022
- Preceded by: Yong Hye-in
- Succeeded by: Yong Hye-in

Leader of the Labor Party
- In office January 2019 – July 2019 Serving with Yong Hye-in
- Preceded by: Lee Gap-yong; Na Do-won (acting)
- Succeeded by: Park Seong-cheol

Personal details
- Born: 2 October 1987 (age 38)
- Party: Basic Income Party (2020–2024; 2024–)
- Other political affiliations: Socialist Party (2007–2012); New Progressive Party (2012); Progressive New Party Conference (2012–2013); Labor Party (2013–2019); New Progressive Alliance (2024)

Shin Ji-hye (Korean: 신지혜, born 2 October 1987) is the former leader and current supreme council member of the Basic Income Party. She co-founded the party alongside Yong Hye-in. Prior to entering politics, she engaged in volunteer work such as assisting with the bathing of children with disabilities and elderly people living alone and worked as a study room teacher in a shantytown in Gangnam. She is a native of Busan.

== Education ==
- Attended Tongyeong Girls' Middle and High School.
- Attended Ewha Womans University, sociology.

== History ==
She served as Secretary General of the Goyang branch of the Peace Camp.

Ahead of the 2016 South Korean legislative election, she served as the chairman of the Goyang-Paju Party Council for the Labor Party. In the 2016 South Korean legislative election, she ran as the Labor Party candidate for Goyang A.

In 2019, she, alongside Yong Hye-in, was elected as leader of the Labor Party. However, later that year she resigned from the role to found the Basic Income Party.

Following the founding of the Basic Income Party, she became Standing Committee Chairperson of the Gyeonggi Provincial Chapter of the party.

On 22 February 2020, she was elected as a board member of the Basic Income Korea Network.

On 9 June 2020, she was elected as the 2nd Standing Representative of the Basic Income Party. Her term as leader expired on 4 June 2022.

In December 2021, she was elected as Standing Chairperson of the Seoul City Chapter of the Basic Income Party.

She has also been serving as a spokesperson for the Basic Income Party.

In 2024, she was elected as a member of the Basic Income Party supreme council. In 2026, she was re-elected as a member of the supreme council.

== Authored works ==
- Women Who Form Parties. Landscape of Knowledge, 26 March 2020.

== Election results ==
Year	Election	Legislature	Office	Electoral district	Party	Votes	Vote share	Position	Result
2014	Local elections	9th	Provincial councillor	3rd electoral district, Goyang, Gyeonggi	Labor Party	2,373	5.02%	3rd	Lost
2016	General election	20th	Member of the National Assembly	Goyang A, Gyeonggi	Labor Party	1,992	1.48%	4th	Lost
2018	Local elections	10th	Provincial councillor	Gyeonggi Province	Labor Party	18,034	0.30%	1st proportional representative	Lost
2020	General election	21st	Member of the National Assembly	Goyang C, Gyeonggi	Basic Income Party	2,058	1.27%	3rd	Lost
2021	By-election	38th	Mayor	Seoul	Basic Income Party	23,628	0.48%	5th	Lost
2022	Local elections	39th	Mayor	Seoul	Basic Income Party	12,619	0.28%	4th	Lost
2026	By-election	22nd	Member of the National Assembly	Gwangsan B, Gwangju	Basic Income Party	3,075	3.24%	5th	Lost
