= Na Gyung-che =

South Korean politician

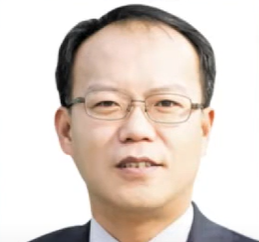
- Born: 18 September 1973 (age 52); Seoul, South Korea
- Title: Gwanak District Council: Member of 6th district council (2010–2014); Labor Party: Delegate (2015); Justice Party: Co-representative (2015)
- Predecessor: Lee Yong-gill
- Successor: Kim Sang-chul
- Political party: Justice Party (2015–); Labor Party (2013–2015); New Progressive Party (2008–2013); Democratic Labor Party (2002–2008)

Korean name
- Hangul: 나경채
- Hanja: 羅景埰
- RR: Na Gyeongchae
- MR: Na Kyŏngch'ae

Na Gyung-che (Korean: 나경채; born 18 September 1973) is the co-representative of the Justice Party in South Korea. He was a delegate of the Labor Party in South Korea.

Party political offices
Preceded by Lee Yong-gill as leader of the 5th delegation	leader of the Labor Party; 2015	Succeeded by Kim Sang-chul as Leader of Emergency Response Commission
Preceded by Sim Sang-jung as leader of the 3rd delegation	Co-representative of the Justice Party; 2015	Succeeded by (None)
