= Park Eun-ji =

Park Eun-ji (Korean: 박은지) is a Korean name consisting of the family name Park and the given name Eun-ji, and may also refer to:

- Park Eun-ji (politician) (1979-2014), South Korean politician
- Park Eun-ji (television personality) (born 1983), South Korean television personality

== See also ==
- J.Y. Park (born 1971), South Korean singer-songwriter
