= Koo Kyo-hyun =

South Korean politician

- Born: 31 July 1977 (age 48); South Korea
- Organization: Arbeit Workers Union (2013–)
- Title: New Progressive Party: Leader of Committee on Youth and Student (2012–2013); Arbeit Workers Union: Convener (2013–); Labor Party: Delegate (2015)
- Predecessor: Kim Sang-chul
- Political party: Labor Party (2013–); New Progressive Party (2012–2013); Socialist Party (2001–2012)

Korean name
- Hangul: 구교현
- RR: Gu Gyohyeon
- MR: Ku Kyohyŏn
- Website: blog.naver.com/12dypro

Koo Kyo-hyun is a delegate of the Labor Party, and a convener of the Arbeit Workers Union in South Korea.

== See also ==
- Arbeit Workers Union

Party political offices
Preceded by Kim Sang-chul as leader of Emergency Response Commission	leader of the Labor Party; 2015	Succeeded by None
