= Lee Yong-gill =

South Korean politician

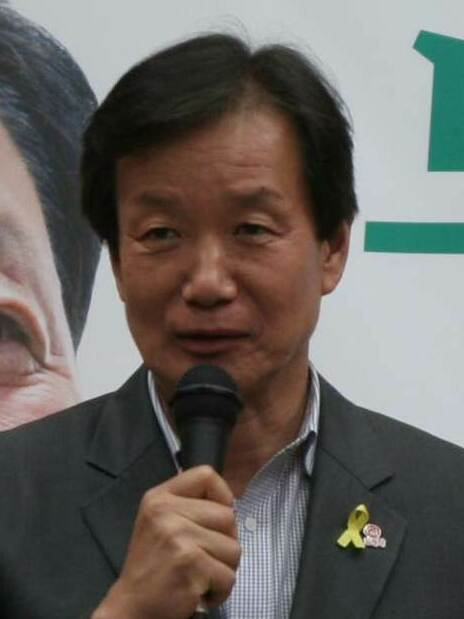
- Lee in 2014
- Born: April 19, 1954 (age 72); Seoul, South Korea
- Organization: Director of the Chungnam branch of KCTU (1996)
- Title: New Progressive Party: Deputy delegate (2009–2010); Secretary General (2012–2013); Delegate (2013); Labor Party: Delegate (2013–2015)
- Predecessor: Kim Il-ung
- Successor: Na Gyung-che
- Political party: Labor Party (2013–2017); New Progressive Party (2008–2013); Democratic Labor Party (2002–2008)

Korean name
- Hangul: 이용길
- Hanja: 李鏞吉
- RR: I Yonggil
- MR: I Yonggil

Lee Yong-gill is a former delegate of the Labor Party in South Korea.

== See also ==
- Hong Sehwa

Party political offices
| Preceded by Kim Il-ung as leader of Emergency Response Commission | leader of the New Progressive Party; 2013 | Succeeded by (None) |
| Preceded by (None) | leader of the Labor Party; 2013–2015 | Succeeded by Na Gyung-che as leader of the 6th delegation |
