= Progressive Political Alliance =

1997 Political Party in South Korea

Progressive Political Alliance 진보정치연합
- Leader: Cho Seung-su; Roh Hoe-chan
- Founded: February 26, 1997
- Dissolved: September 7, 1997
- Preceded by: Popular Party
- Succeeded by: Construction National Victory 21
- Ideology: Progressivism; Progressive Democracy
- Political position: Centre-left to left-wing
- Colors: Orange

Korean name
- Hangul: 진보정치연합
- RR: Jinbo jeongchi yeonhap
- MR: Chinbo chŏngch'i yŏnhap

The Progressive Political Alliance (Korean: 진보정치연합) was a progressive political party in South Korea, founded on 26 February 1997 with a core group consisting of members of the Popular Party’s reconstruction faction such as Roh Hoe-chan and Cho Seung-su. The party advocated for progressive politics and progressive democracy but was automatically dissolved after joining the founding of Construction National Victory 21 ahead of the 1997 South Korean presidential election.

== See also ==
- Roh Hoe-chan
- List of political parties in South Korea
- Popular Party (South Korea)
