= Goyang A =

Constitutency of South Korea

- Single-member constituency for the National Assembly
- Location of the constituency
- District(s): Goyang (part)
- Region: Gyeonggi
- Electorate: 228,942 (2024)

Current constituency
- Created: 2016
- Seats: 1
- Party: Democratic Party
- Member: Kim Sung-hoi
- Created from: Goyang Deogyang A Goyang Ilsandong

Goyang A (Korean: 고양시 갑) is a constituency of the National Assembly of South Korea. The constituency consists of parts of Goyang, Gyeonggi Province. As of 2024, 217,323 eligible voters were registered in the constituency. The constituency was created in 2016 from parts of the former Goyang Deogyang A and Goyang Ilsandong constituency.

== History ==
Goyang A is widely regarded as a progressive and liberal stronghold constituency, as the area has consistently elected members of center-left political parties except for the 2008 South Korean legislative election.

From 2016 to 2024, the constituency was represented by Justice Party leader Sim Sang-jung. It was also the only regional single-member constituency represented by the Justice Party in the National Assembly until 2024. Sim was succeeded by Kim Sung-hoi of the Democratic Party after being defeated by a wide margin in the 2024 South Korean legislative election.

== List of members of the National Assembly ==
Election	Member	Party	Dates	Notes
2016	Sim Sang-jung	Justice	2016–2024	Leader of the Justice Party (2015–2017, 2019–2020)
2020	Sim Sang-jung	Justice	2016–2024	Leader of the Justice Party (2015–2017, 2019–2020)
2024	Kim Sung-hoi	Democratic	2024–present	

== Election results ==
=== 2024 ===
Legislative Election 2024: Goyang A
Party	Candidate	Votes	%	±%
Democratic	Kim Sung-hoi	69,617	45.30	+17.94
People Power	Han Chang-seob	54,308	35.34	+1.59
Green Justice	Sim Sang-jung	28,293	18.41	−20.97
Independent	Kim Seong-nam	1,435	0.93	new
Rejected ballots		1,344	–	–
Turnout		153,653	67.11	+0.47
Registered electors		228,942		
Democratic gain from Green Justice		Swing	+17.94	

=== 2020 ===
Legislative Election 2020: Goyang A
Party	Candidate	Votes	%	±%
Justice	Sim Sang-jung	56,516	39.38	−13.59
United Future	Lee Kyung-hwan	47,003	32.75	−4.05
Democratic	Moon Myung-soon	39,268	27.36	+18.62
National Revolutionary	Go Pyeong-gi	704	0.49	new
Rejected ballots		1,339	–	–
Turnout		144,830	66.64	+6.23
Registered electors		217,323		
Justice hold		Swing		

=== 2016 ===
Legislative Election 2016: Goyang A
Party	Candidate	Votes	%	±%
Justice	Sim Sang-jung	71,043	52.97	–
Saenuri	Son Bum-gyu	49,356	36.80	–
Democratic	Park Jun	11,726	8.74	–
Labor	Shin Ji-hye	1,992	1.48	–
Rejected ballots		1,448	–	
Turnout		135,565	60.41	–
Registered electors		224,395		
Justice win (new seat)				

== See also ==
- List of constituencies of the National Assembly of South Korea
