= Kim Il-ung =

South Korean politician

- Born: 12 November 1976 (age 49); Osan, South Korea
- Title: New Progressive Party: Leader of 2nd Emergency Response Commission (2012–2013); Leader of Party Commission of Seoul (2011–2013); Labor Party: Leader of Party Commission of Seoul (2013–)
- Predecessor: Hong Sehwa
- Successor: Lee Yong-gill
- Political party: Labor Party (2013–); New Progressive Party (2008–2013); Democratic Labor Party (2002–2008)

Korean name
- Hangul: 김일웅
- Hanja: 金一雄
- RR: Gim Ilung
- MR: Kim Irung

Kim Il-ung is a former Leader of the 2nd Emergency Response Commission of the Labor Party in South Korea.

Party political offices
Preceded by Hong Sehwa; An Hyo-sang as Co-representative of the 4th delegation	Leader of 2nd Emergency Response Commission of the New Progressive Party; 2012–2013	Succeeded by Lee Yong-gill as leader of the 5th delegation
