= Construction National Victory 21 =

Construction National Victory 21 건설국민승리21
- Abbreviation: People's Victory 21; National Victory 21
- Leader: Kwon Young-ghil; Lee Chang-bok
- Founded: September 7, 1997
- Dissolved: November 3, 1999
- Preceded by: Progressive Political Alliance; Progressive Political Union; Popular Party
- Succeeded by: Democratic Labor Party (2000)
- Ideology: Democratic socialism Left-wing nationalism Progressivism
- Political position: Left-wing
- Colors: Orange

Korean name
- Hangul: 건설국민승리21
- Hanja: 建設國民勝利21
- RR: Geonseol gungmin seungni 21
- MR: Kŏnsŏl kungmin sŭngni 21

Construction National Victory 21 (Korean: 건설국민승리21) was a progressive political party in South Korea registered on 7 September 1997, commonly abbreviated as National Victory 21 or People's Victory 21.

== History ==
The Popular Party was the first progressive party established after the democratisation of 1987, was dissolved by the National Election Commission for failing to meet the required vote threshold. Its dissolution caused a rift among the labor activists who had helped found it, splitting them into factions favouring the party's reconstruction and those favouring joining the Democratic Liberal Party (DLP). The faction favouring the DLP, led by figures such as Lee Jae-oh and Kim Moon-soo joined the DLP alongside Kim Young-sam, the former presidential candidate of the Reunification Democratic Party, while the reconstruction faction sought a comeback by founding the Progressive Politics Alliance. In 1995 the Progressive Politics Alliance invited Kwon Young-ghil, the prominent labor activist and chairman of the Korean Confederation of Trade Unions (KCTU), to serve as its representative; however, Kwon declined, stating that it was a time to focus on labor, farmer, and urban poor movements rather than party politics. Subsequently, the National Alliance for Democracy and National Unification of Korea, the country's largest progressive political organisation, joined the Progressive Politics Alliance but later withdrew due to internal ideological conflicts; unlike the Progressive Politics Alliance, which remained sceptical about the founding of "Victory 21", the National Alliance participated directly in its establishment. Ultimately, weakened by the National Alliance's withdrawal, the Progressive Politics Alliance changed its course and decided to join Victory 21.

Galvanised by the 1996 incident in which the New Korea Party derailed labor law amendments through the National Assembly, the labor movement and its activists sought to field a progressive presidential candidate for the 1997 South Korean presidential election; consequently, the Korean Confederation of Trade Unions (KCTU) joined the founding "People's Victory 21". On 7 September 1997 the group nominated Kwon Young-ghil, then chairman of the KCTU, as its presidential candidate.Campaigning under the slogans "Rise Up, Korea" and "Overcome Existing Political Forces to Pursue True Reform and Progressive Politics," Kwon secured 306,026 votes, achieving a vote share of 1.2%. Subsequently, People's Victory 21 adopted a co-leadership system, electing Kwon Young-ghil (the inaugural KCTU chairman) and Lee Chang-bok (former representative of the National Alliance for Democracy and National Unification of Korea) as joint representatives.

During the South Korea's second simultaneous local elections in 1998, the group ran independent candidates in alliance with the labor sector and contributed to the election of two heads of local governments in Ulsan Metropolitan City. Additionally, they helped elect local council members in Seongnam City and South Jeolla Province through alliances with independent candidates from the labor sector. Subsequently, as the membership of the "People's Victory 21" surged and its influence expanded, the organisation was succeeded by the Democratic Labor Party.

== See also ==
- Kwon Young-ghil
- Democratic Labor Party (South Korea)
- List of political parties in South Korea
- Politics of South Korea
- 1997 South Korean presidential election
- 1998 South Korean local elections
