= Kang Byung-won =

South Korean politician (born 1973)

- 강병원
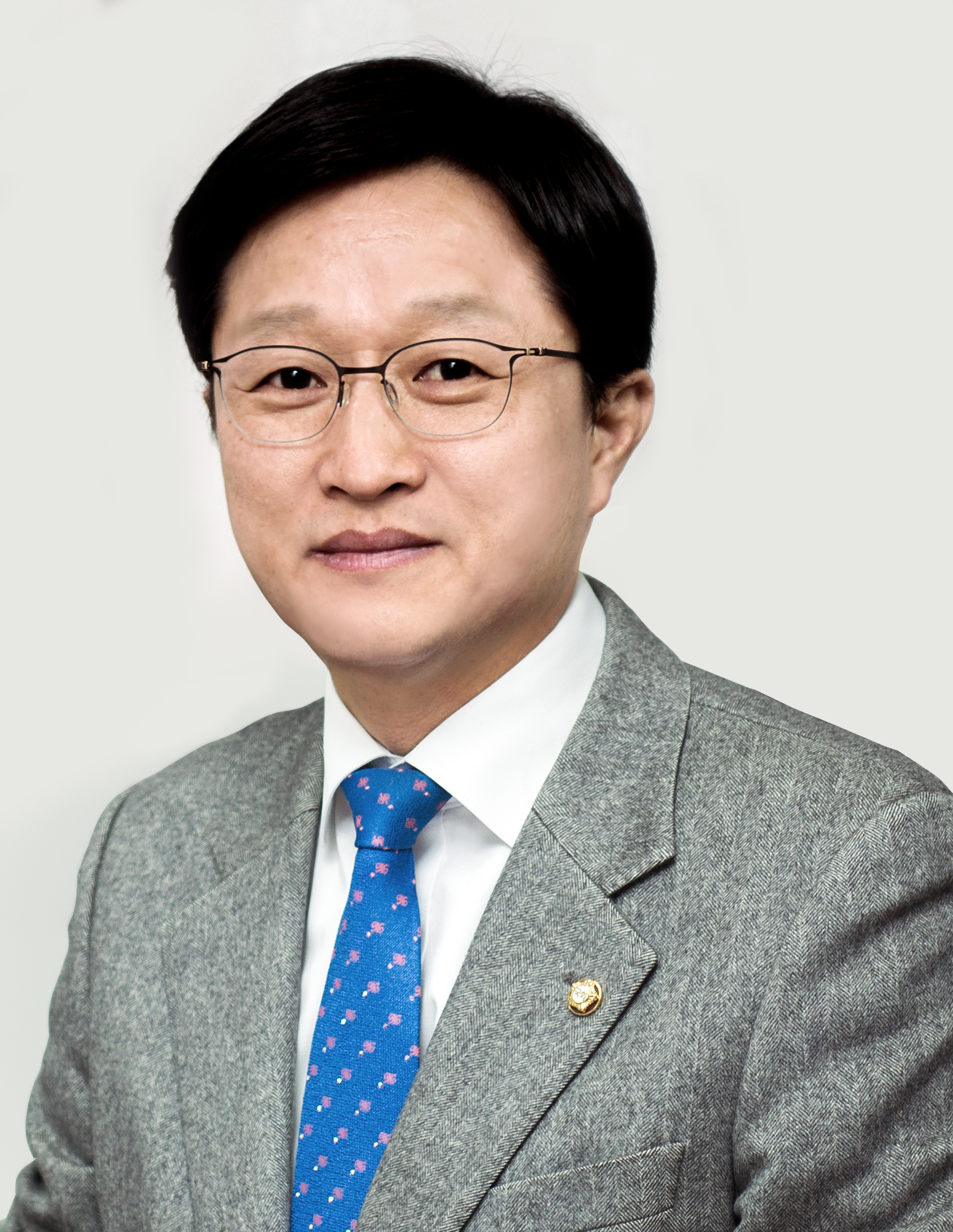

Member of the National Assembly
- In office 30 May 2016 – 29 May 2024
- Preceded by: Lee Jae-oh
- Succeeded by: Kim Woo-young
- Constituency: Seoul Eunpyeong B

Personal details
- Born: 16 March 1970 (age 56) Gochang, North Jeolla Province, South Korea
- Party: Democratic Party of Korea
- Education: Seoul National University
- Occupation: Administrator of Participatory Govt.
- Website: https://blog.naver.com/kangbw89

Korean name
- Hangul: 강병원
- Hanja: 姜炳遠
- RR: Gang Byeongwon
- MR: Kang Pyŏngwŏn

Kang Byung-won (Korean: 강병원; Hanja: 姜炳遠; born 21 November 1973) is a South Korean politician in the liberal Democratic Party of Korea and has been a member of the National Assembly for Seoul Eunpyeong B since 2016.

Since 2 May 2021, he is one of a 5-members of the party's top councilor.

In 2022, Kang ran for party leader.

== Electoral history ==
Election	Year	District	Party affiliation	Votes	Percentage of votes	Results
20th National Assembly General Election	2016	Seoul Eunpyeong B	Democratic Party	42,704	36.74%	Won
21st National Assembly General Election	2020	Seoul Eunpyeong B	Democratic Party	78,897	57.41%	Won
