= Voice of the People (South Korea) =

South Korean online newspaper

Voice of the People (VOP; Korean: 민중의소리) is a South Korean online newspaper launched on May 15, 2000. It was established to represent a progressive viewpoint in the Korean news market dominated by conservative media. In spite of its short history, it has steadily increased its readership especially through its success on social network services.

== Awards ==
- 2002 The 14th Democratic Press Award, Grand Prize (Reporting Team)
- 2003 The 1st Human Rights in the Media Award (Editing Bureau)
- 2005 The 7th Democratic Citizen Press Award (Reporter Kim Cheol-soo)
- 2006 The 2nd Internet Reporter Award (Reporter Kim Do-gyun et al.)
- 2008 The June 15 North-South Joint Declaration Southern Headquarters Achievement Award (CEO Yoon Won-seok)
- 2009 The 11th Democratic Citizen Press Award (Reporters Hong Min-cheol and Chang Myeong-gu)
- 2009 Jeon-ju International Film Festival, Bronze Award (Audio-Video Department Chief Suh Sae-jin)
- 2013 Seoul Independent Film Festival, Outstanding Picture Award (Reporter Goo Ja-hwan)

== See also ==
- Labor Party (South Korea)
- Left-wing nationalism
- Progressive Party (South Korea, 2017)
- Progressivism in South Korea
