= SRWP =

SRWP may refer to:

- Socialist Revolutionary Workers Party (South Africa), a political party in South Africa
- Socialist Revolutionary Workers' Party, a former unregistered political party in South Korea
