= Stay where you are =

Stay where you are may also refer to:

- A track of Call the Doctor by Sleater-Kinney
- Stay where you are (South Korea), a silent march campaign announced by Yong Hyein in the aftermath of the Sinking of the MV Sewol
