= 1956 South Korean presidential election =

- 15 May 1956
- Presidential election
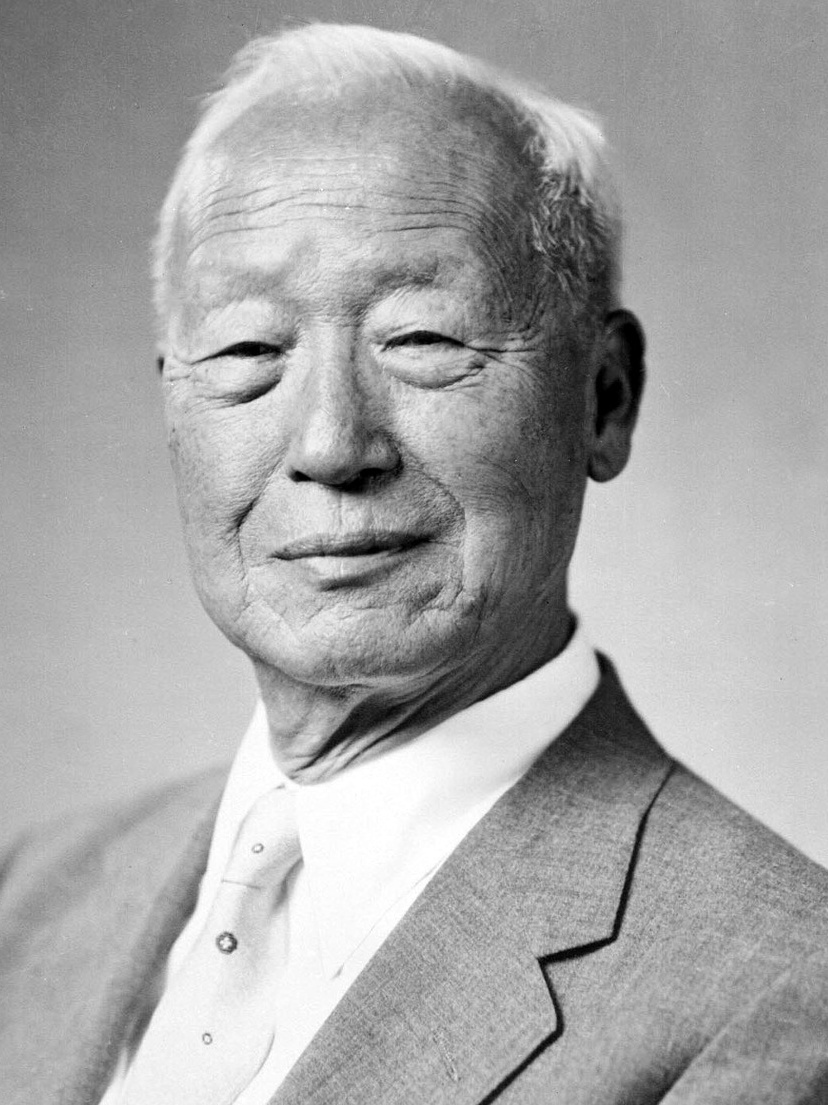

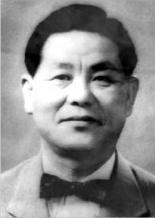
Candidate	Syngman Rhee	Cho Bong-am
Party	Liberal	Progressive
Popular vote	5,046,437	2,163,808
Percentage	69.99%	30.01%
President before election
Syngman Rhee
Liberal
Elected President
Syngman Rhee
Liberal
- Vice presidential election
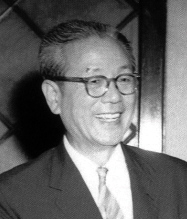

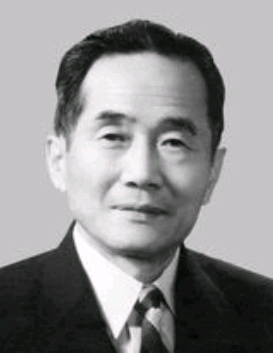
Candidate	Chang Myon	Lee Ki Poong
Party	Democratic	Liberal
Popular vote	4,012,654	3,805,502
Percentage	46.43%	44.03%
Vice president before election
Ham Tae-young
Independent
Elected Vice president
Chang Myon
Democratic

Presidential and vice presidential elections were held in South Korea on 15 May 1956. The result was a victory for Syngman Rhee, who won 70.0% of the vote. Voter turnout was 94.4%.

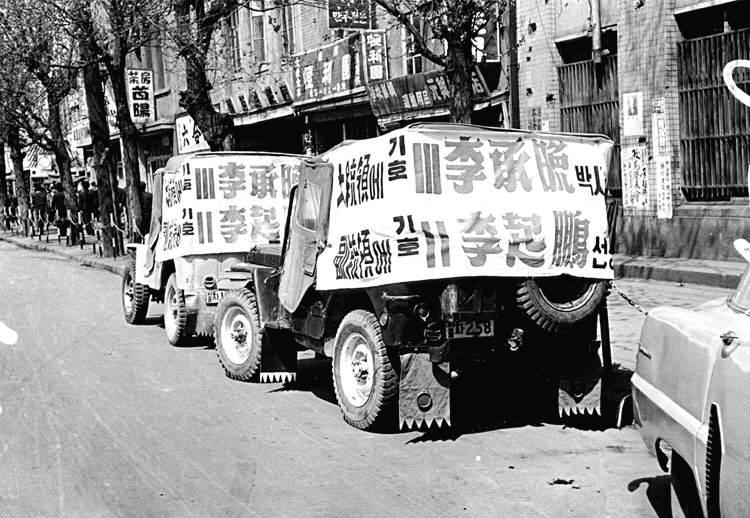
Election posters for Rhee's Liberal party

Rhee, who at that time held a virtual monopoly on political power, was opposed by Shin Ik-hee and Cho Bong-am. Shin died before the election by disease, and Cho campaigned on a platform of peaceful reunification in opposition to Rhee's policy of "March North and unify Korea". Cho exceeded expectations by receiving over 30% of the vote. Three years later, Cho was accused of violating the National Security Law and executed.

== Results ==
=== President ===
Candidate	Party	Votes	%
Syngman Rhee	Liberal Party	5,046,437	69.99
Cho Bong-am	Progressive Party	2,163,808	30.01
Total		7,210,245	100.00
Valid votes		7,210,245	79.52
Invalid/blank votes		1,856,818	20.48
Total votes		9,067,063	100.00
Registered voters/turnout		9,606,870	94.38
Source: Nohlen et al.

==== By province and city ====
Province/City	Syngman Rhee		Cho Bong-am	
Province/City	Votes	%	Votes	%
Seoul	205,253	63.28	119,129	36.72
Gyeonggi	607,757	77.14	180,150	22.86
Gangwon	644,693	90.81	65,270	9.19
North Chungcheong	353,201	86.10	57,026	13.90
South Chungcheong	530,531	77.06	157,973	22.94
North Jeolla	424,674	60.17	281,068	39.83
South Jeolla	741,623	72.11	286,787	27.89
North Gyeongsang	621,530	55.32	501,917	44.68
South Gyeongsang	830,492	62.30	502,507	37.70
Jeju	86,683	87.86	11,981	12.14
Total	5,046,437	69.99	2,163,808	30.01
Source: National Election Commission

=== Vice president ===
Candidate	Party	Votes	%
Chang Myon	Democratic Party	4,012,654	46.43
Lee Ki-poong	Liberal Party	3,805,502	44.03
Lee Beom-seok	Independent	317,579	3.67
Yun Chi-young	Korea Nationalist Party	241,278	2.79
Paeg Song-uk	Independent	230,555	2.67
Yi Yun-yong	Choseon Democratic Party	34,926	0.40
Total		8,642,494	100.00
Valid votes		8,642,494	95.35
Invalid/blank votes		421,700	4.65
Total votes		9,064,194	100.00
Registered voters/turnout		9,606,870	94.35

==== By province and city ====
Province/City	Chang Myon		Lee Ki-poong		Lee Beom-seok		Yun Chi-young		Paeg Song-uk		Yi Yun-yong	
Province/City	Votes	%	Votes	%	Votes	%	Votes	%	Votes	%	Votes	%
Seoul	451,037	76.90	95,454	16.27	21,530	3.67	12,445	2.12	3,802	0.65	2,285	0.39
Gyeonggi	450,140	44.90	424,104	42.30	55,621	5.55	40,720	4.06	25,216	2.52	6,768	0.68
Gangwon	103,493	13.56	611,704	80.16	23,612	3.09	14,046	1.84	7,052	0.92	3,225	0.42
North Chungcheong	159,310	33.66	245,218	51.81	28,264	5.97	14,411	3.04	24,727	5.22	1,347	0.28
South Chungcheong	374,209	43.71	364,750	42.60	51,589	6.03	29,054	3.39	31,895	3.73	4,675	0.55
North Jeolla	428,410	51.04	338,283	40.30	28,954	3.45	25,430	3.03	15,596	1.86	2,738	0.33
South Jeolla	529,341	43.66	549,279	45.30	33,890	2.80	25,979	2.14	70,628	5.83	3,294	0.27
North Gyeongsang	715,342	54.35	475,754	36.15	41,037	3.12	38,188	2.90	40,544	3.08	5,303	0.40
South Gyeongsang	778,903	52.51	623,409	42.03	30,264	2.04	38,288	2.58	7,899	0.53	4,575	0.31
Jeju	22,469	19.89	77,547	68.65	7,818	6.92	2,717	2.41	2,196	1.94	216	0.19
Total	4,012,654	46.43	3,805,502	44.03	317,579	3.67	241,278	2.79	230,555	2.67	34,926	0.40
