= Hankyoreh Democratic Party =

1988–1991 political party in South Korea

Hankyoreh Democratic Party 한겨레민주당
- Abbreviation: HDP, Hankyoreh
- Founded: 6 April 1988
- Dissolved: 13 March 1991
- Merged into: Popular Party (majority); Democratic Party (minority)
- Ideology: Progressivism (South Korean); Social liberalism
- Political position: Centre-left
- Colours: Peach

The Hankyoreh Democratic Party (HDP; Korean: 한겨레민주당; Hanja: 한겨레民主黨; RR: Hangyeore minjudang; lit. 'One Nation Democratic Party') was a political party of South Korea from 1988 to 1991.

== History ==
The party was formed in 1988 as the alternative for 2 main oppositions ― Reunification Democratic Party and Peace Democratic Party. The original name was National Democratic Party (민족민주당), but changed as "sounds like an extremist". Most of members were the crucial figure of the League of National Democratic Youth and Students in 1970s.

The formation took on 17 February 1988, and officially on 29 March. Ye Chun-ho was elected as the Permanent President.

The party participated in 1988 election. Nevertheless, all candidates from party leadership i.e. Ye Chun-ho, Cho Soon-hyung, Goh Young-gu, Yoo In-tae, and so on were lost. Park Hyung-oh, who ran for Shinan, was the sole elected representative due to the political ban of Han Hwa-gap (Peace Democratic Party a.k.a. PDP). Park subsequently joined PDP due to the pre-agreement, made the party as an extra-parliamentary.

After a serious defeat in the general election, the majority of its members left the party and formed the Popular Party in 1989, while some other members joined the Democratic Party (known as Little Democrats). The party soon couldn't meet up with the minimal requirements as a political party, and was deregistered on 13 March 1991.

== Election results ==
Election	Leader	Votes	%	Seats			Position	Status
Election	Leader	Votes	%	Constituency	Party list	Total	Position	Status
1988	Ye Chun-ho	251,236	1.28	1 / 224	0 / 75	1 / 299	5th	Opposition

== Notable figures ==
- Ye Chun-ho
- Cho Soon-hyung
- Goh Young-gu
- Yoo In-tae
- Kim Boo-kyum

== See also ==
- The Hankyoreh
