= Postwar World =

2024 book by Pak Noja

- Author: Pak Noja
- Language: Korean
- Publisher: The Hankyoreh Publisher
- Publication date: February 20, 2024
- Publication place: South Korea
- ISBN: 9791172130015

Postwar World (Korean: 전쟁 이후의 세계) is a Korean-language book by Pak Noja, Russian-Korean scholar and professor of University of Oslo. It discusses the impact of the 2022 to present Russian invasion of Ukraine and its impact on the world order.

== Contents ==
He argues that major wars between powerful nations tend to happen every 30 to 50 years, as the dominant world order weakens.

He points to several historical examples:

- The Napoleonic Wars led to a two-power system with Britain and Russia at the centre. However, the Crimean War chipped away at Russia's dominance, allowing Britain to take the lead.
- Germany's victory in the Franco-Prussian War challenged Britain, but Germany's defeat in the First World War also led to Britain losing its top spot to the United States.
- After the Second World War, the US and the Soviet Union became the two superpowers during the Cold War. However, with the end of the Cold War, the US emerged as the sole superpower.

However, Park observes that this US-led unipolar system is being challenged by major non-Western powers such as China, Russia, and Iran. This is reflected in ongoing conflicts between major powers, such as the Israel–Palestine conflict, the Nagorno-Karabakh War, and the recent war in Ukraine. Park suggests that these events signal a shift towards a new multipolar world order, beginning around 2022.

The author explains why the anti-war movement in Russia is relatively small. Unlike South Korea, where a sense of solidarity developed through the democratisation movement after the 1980s, Russia experienced the collapse of the Soviet Union and the sudden introduction of capitalism. As a side effect, social trust decreased and distrust of others increased, which, it is argued, prevented social movements from developing.

In addition, unlike some Korean 'left' figures who evaluate the Russia–Ukraine war as 'Russia's self-rescue measure against the West' and the Putin regime as a 'progressive alternative' to neoliberalism, he strongly criticises the unethical nature of the Putin regime. He points to the reality of Russia, where the rights of non-regular workers and platform workers are violated and democratic unions are fiercely oppressed, and to the massacres, targeted assassinations, illegal confinement, and forced migration committed by the Putin regime in Ukraine. However, some Korean leftists hold positive views on Putin's Russia. He emphasises that these illusions must be abandoned. Nevertheless, the author argues that for peace on the Korean Peninsula, although Putin's invasion of Ukraine is clearly a crime, South Korea must abandon 'blind obedience to the United States' and restore diplomatic relations with Russia.

== Reviews ==
Reporter Kim Han-byeol of the JoongAng Ilbo agreed with the author's explanation of why the war continues despite international sanctions against Russia and why support for the war is high within Russia. However, he disagreed with the argument that, for peace on the Korean Peninsula, 'blind obedience to the United States' must be abandoned and relations with Russia must be restored.

Yang Seon-ah, a reporter for the Hankyoreh newspaper, said that in this book, the Russian author kindly pointed out the ideological identity and goals of the regime deep in the consciousness of the Putin regime. At the same time, it also reported on the current state of Russian civil society and wrote that it well explains why there is no noticeable strong anti-war movement or movement against the regime in Russia, even though the surveillance and oppression of the Putin regime continues.

The left-wing Korean newspaper Redian reviewed that this book will serve as a reliable compass for readers who are curious about what the 'postwar world' will look like and the path Korea should take.
