= Han Chang-seob =

South Korean politician (born 1967)

Han Chang-seob (Korean: 한창섭; born 13 November 1967) is a South Korean public official. In 2022, he was made Vice Minister of the Ministry of Public Administration and Security. In February 2023, he was made acting Minister of the Interior and Safety after Lee Sang-min was suspended by the National Assembly for his handling of the Seoul Halloween crowd crush.

== Election results ==
Year	Elections	Constituency	Political party	Votes (%)	Results
2024	22nd National Assembly General Election	Goyang A (Gyeonggi)	PPP	54,308 (35.34%)	Defeated
