= Park Eun-ji (politician) =

South Korean politician

Park Eun Ji
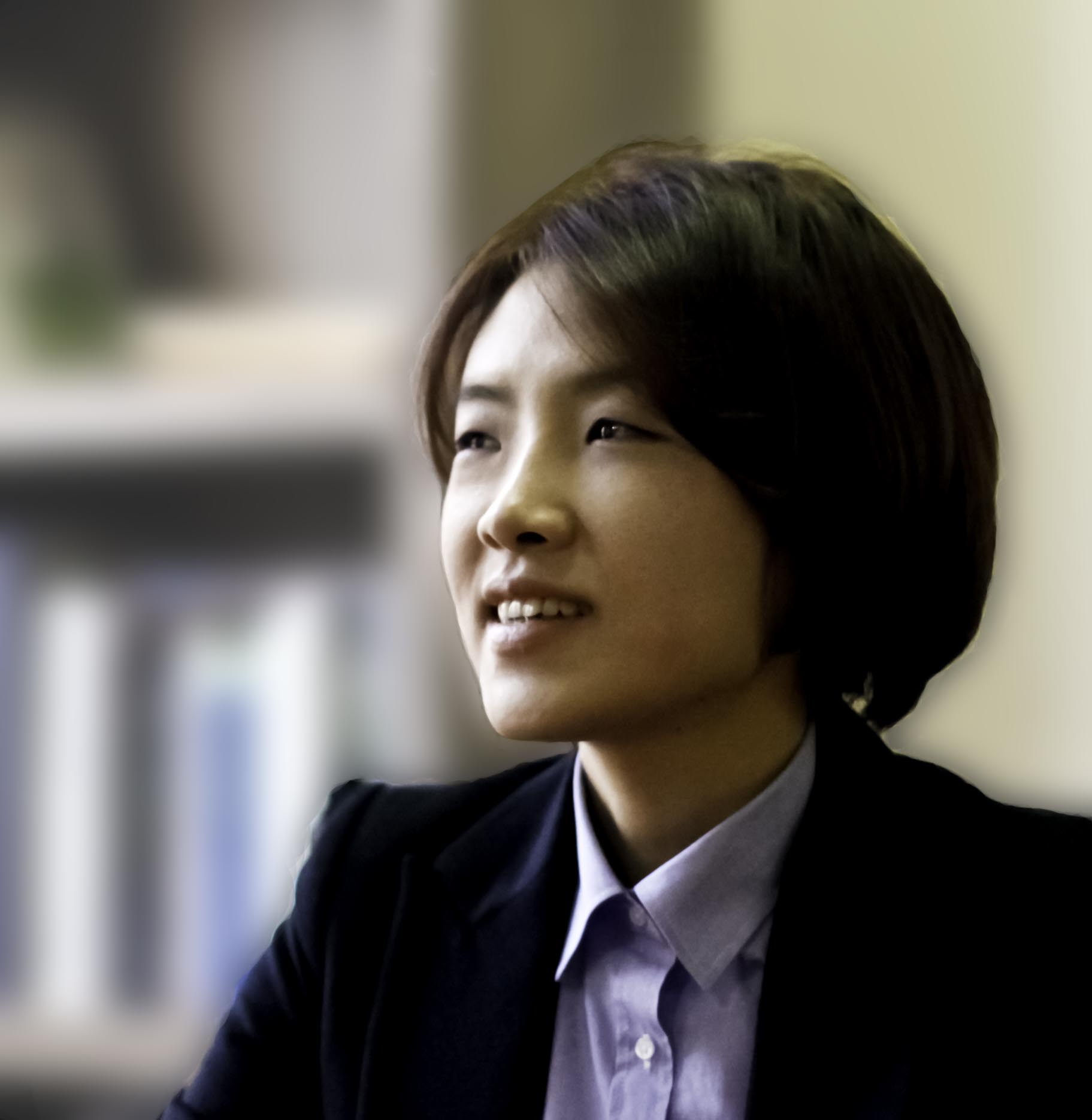
- Park Eun Ji
- Born: January 23, 1979; Seoul, South Korea
- Died: March 8, 2014 (aged 35); Seoul, South Korea
- Education: Korea University (1997–2001)
- Organization: People's Solidarity for Social Progress (2004–2014)
- Title: Labor Party: vice delegate (2013–2014); spokesperson (2013–2014); New Progressive Party: vice delegate (2013); spokesperson (2012–2013); vice spokesperson (2011–2012)
- Political party: Labor Party (2013–2014); New Progressive Party (2008–2013)
- Children: 1

Korean name
- Hangul: 박은지
- Hanja: 朴恩智
- RR: Bak Eunji
- MR: Pak Ŭnji
- Website: blog.naver.com/ejparkchoi

Park Eun Ji (23 January 1979 – 8 March 2014) was the vice delegate of the Labor Party in South Korea. She also was a proportional representation candidate of the New Progressive Party in the 19th legislative election. She died at her house on March 8, 2014. Her death was ruled a suicide by hanging.

== Death ==
Park was found dead at her home on March 8, 2014, and her death was presumed to be a suicide. There was no suicide note.

== See also ==
- Roh Hoe-chan
- Park No-ja
