= 1991 South Korean local elections =

Local elections in South Korea

Two local elections were held in South Korea in 1991. District, city and county councilor elections were held on 26 March 1991, while metropolitan city and provincial councilor elections were held on 20 June 1991.

== District, city and county councilor elections ==
Elections for 4,304 district, city and county councilors were held on 26 March 1991. 13,238,308 voters, or 55% of the 24,067,144 registered voters, voted in the elections.

Party	Votes	%	Seats
Democratic Liberal Party			2,142
New United Democratic Party			785
Democratic Party			33
Independent			1,343
Vacant			1
Total			4,304
Total votes	13,238,308	–	
Registered voters/turnout	24,067,144	55.01	
Source: National Election Commission based on the Democratic Liberal Party's announcement

A re-election was held on 30 April 1991 in a constituency in Seonju-dong, Gumi, North Gyeongsang after Kim Pan-su, a candidate who was set to be elected without a vote, withdrew on 25 March following his arrest for paying the only opposing candidate in the constituency to withdraw from the election.

== Metropolitan city and provincial councilor elections ==
Elections for 866 metropolitan city and provincial councilors were held on 20 June 1991.16,533,934 voters, or 58.9% of the 28,083,024 registered voters, voted in the elections.

=== Results summary ===
Party	Votes	%	Seats
Democratic Liberal Party	6,588,175	40.57	564
New United Democratic Party	3,562,988	21.94	165
Democratic Party	2,316,528	14.27	21
Popular Party	125,488	0.77	1
Justice Democratic Party	1,954	0.01	0
Independent	3,643,965	22.44	115
Total	16,239,098	100.00	866
Valid votes	16,239,098	98.31	
Invalid/blank votes	278,899	1.69	
Total votes	16,517,997	100.00	
Registered voters/turnout	28,083,024	58.82	
Source: National Election Commission, Institute of Developing Economies

=== Results per region ===
Region	Registered voters	Turnout	%	Seats	DLP	NUDP	DP	PP	Ind.
Seoul	7,212,887	3,781,979	52.4	132	110	21	1		
Busan	2,519,619	1,450,847	57.6	51	50		1		
Daegu	1,439,609	762,916	53.0	28	26				2
Incheon	1,243,072	670,328	53.9	27	20	1	3		3
Gwangju	712,477	395,793	55.6	23		19			4
Daejeon	671,919	401,721	59.8	23	14	2	1		6
Gyeonggi	3,958,349	2,195,001	55.5	117	94	3	2		18
Gangwon	1,016,647	696,562	68.5	54	34		1	1	18
North Chungcheong	892,420	583,739	65.4	38	31		2		5
South Chungcheong	1,180,314	816,160	69.1	55	37		4		14
North Jeolla	1,304,059	814,233	62.4	52		51			1
South Jeolla	1,522,590	993,795	65.3	73	1	67			5
North Gyeongsang	1,804,859	1,239,975	68.7	87	66		5		16
South Gyeongsang	2,319,521	1,502,252	64.8	89	73	1	1		14
Jeju	284,682	212,696	74.7	17	8				9
Total	28,083,024	16,517,997	58.9	866	564	165	21	1	115
Source: Council of Local Authorities for International Relations
