= Geum Min =

South Korean politician (born 1962)

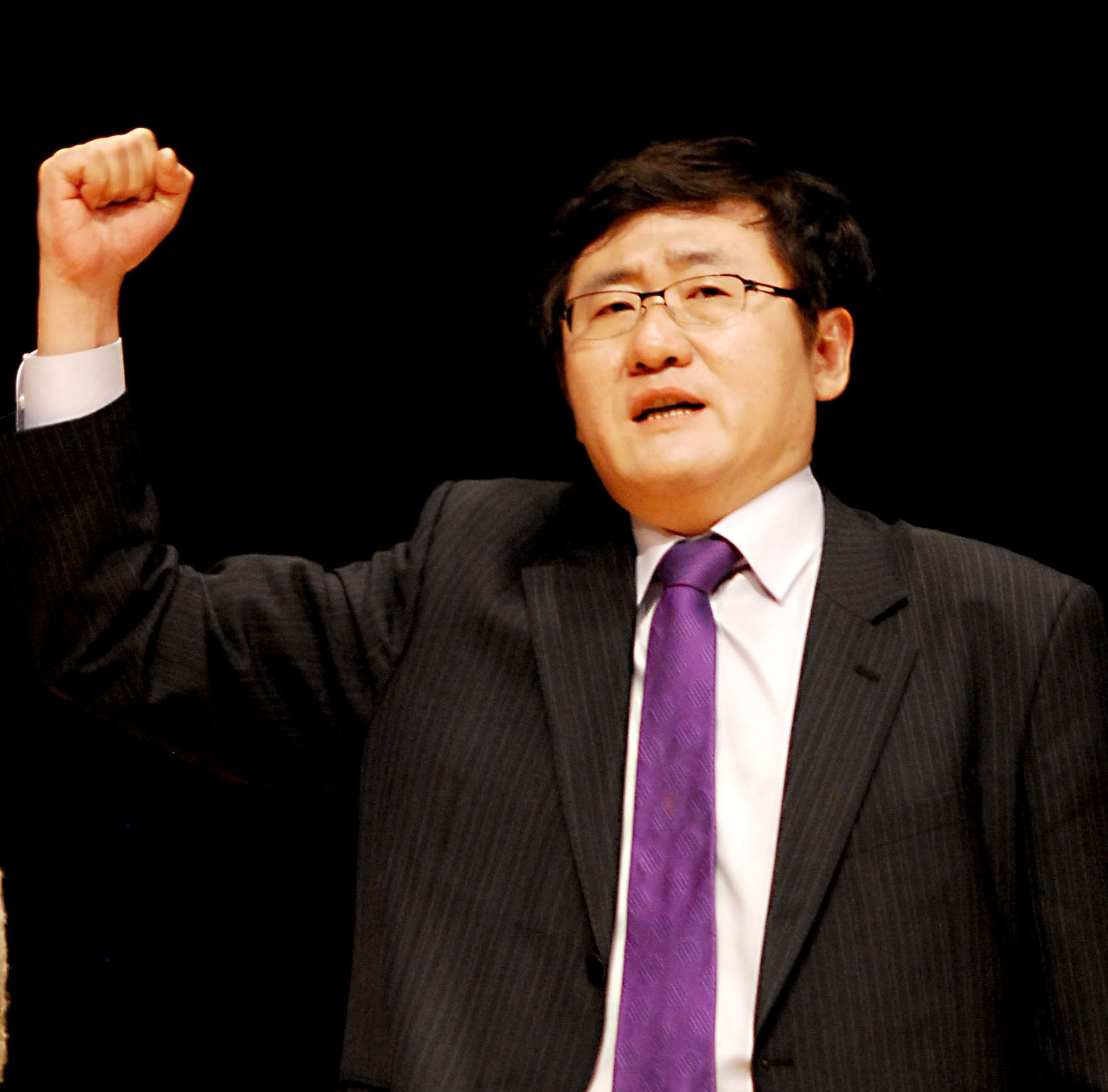
- Geum Min
- Born: September 3, 1962 (age 63); Busan, South Korea
- Education: Korea University (1981–1985); University of Göttingen (1989–2001)
- Organization(s): Preparatory Committee for Collective Action for Basic Income (2014–); Basic Income Korean Network (2009–)
- Title: Socialist Party: Delegate (2006–2008)
- Predecessor: Shin Seog Jun
- Successor: Choi Gwang-eun
- Political party: Labor Party (2013–); Socialist Party (2001–2013)

Korean name
- Hangul: 금민
- Hanja: 琴民
- RR: Geum Min
- MR: Kŭm Min
- Website: geummin.com

Geum Min (Korean: 금민; born September 3, 1962) is a South Korean politician. He was a Socialist Party delegate from 2006 until 2008. He also came forward as a candidate in the 17th presidential election.

== See also ==
- Hong Sehwa

Party political offices
Preceded by Shin Seog Jun	Leader of the Socialist Party; 2006–2008	Succeeded by Choi Gwang-eun
