= Eun-ji =

- Hangul: 은지
- RR: Eunji
- MR: Ŭnji
- IPA: [ɯndʑi]

Eun-ji, also spelled Eun-jee, is a Korean given name. It was the third-most popular name for baby girls born in South Korea in 1990.

== People ==
People with this name include:

Sportspeople

- Lee Eun-ji (cyclist) (born 1989), South Korean track cyclist
- Lim Eun-ji (born 1989), South Korean pole vaulter
- Gim Eun-ji (born 1993), South Korean curler

Entertainers

- MayBee (born Kim Eun-ji, 1979), South Korean singer
- Jo Eun-ji (born 1981), South Korean actress
- Park Eun-ji (television personality) (born 1983), South Korean television personality
- Jung Eun-ji (born Jung Hye-rim, 1993), South Korean singer and actress, member of girl group Apink

Other

- Park Eun-ji (politician) (1979–2014), South Korean politician

== See also ==
- List of Korean given names
