= Progressive Party (South Korea, 1956) =

1956–1959 political party in South Korea

Progressive Party 진보당
- Leader: Cho Pong-am
- General Secretary: Yun Kil-chung
- Founded: January 26, 1956 (de facto); November 10, 1956 (de jure)
- Dissolved: February 25, 1958
- Headquarters: Jongro 2-ga, Jongro-gu, South Korea
- Membership (1956): around 1,500
- Ideology: Progressivism (South Korean); Social democracy (de jure); Social liberalism (de facto)
- Political position: Centre-left

- Progressive Party
- Hangul: 진보당
- Hanja: 進步黨
- RR: Jinbodang
- MR: Chinbodang

Progressive Party (Korean: 진보당) was a short-lived moderate left political party founded after the Korean War in South Korea under the leadership of Cho Bong-am. It was a major political force from 1956 to 1958, and fell apart in 1959.

== History ==
The Progressive Party was founded in the aftermath of the Korean War under Cho's leadership. Cho and his followers were able to build a wide coalition with the country's leftist forces. Cho also successfully created coalitions with right-wing forces opposed to Syngman Rhee's dictatorship. The party's founding and moderate success in Korea's hostile political environment is considered a large result of Bong-am's personal charisma. The Progressive Party advocated peaceful unification with North Korea, through strengthening the country's democratic forces and winning in a unified Korean election. Cho called for both anti-communist and anti-authoritarian politics, as well as advocating for social welfare policies for the peasants and urban poor.

In the 1956 election, Cho ran against Rhee, the anti-communist strongman president. Cho lost with 30% of the vote, which exceeded expectations. Following the election, the Progressive Party broke apart due to factionalism.

== Political position ==
The Progressive Party officially advocated social democracy, but was regarded as a liberal party. In fact, scholars in South Korea evaluated that the Progressive Party and Cho Bong-am were not German "social democracy" but an American "progressive liberalism" route, which was also reported by The Chosun Ilbo, South Korea's right-wing conservative journalist. (At that time, in South Korean politics, the term "liberal" was often used by right-wing conservative and Minjudangkye forces in a similar sense to "anti-communist".)

Cho, who led the party, proposed a policy to appease North Korea, affecting the Sunshine Policy of modern South Korean liberals. At the same time, however, Cho was a strong anti-communist and a believer in liberal democracy.
