= Democratic Party (South Korea, 1990) =

1990–1991 political party in South Korea

Democratic Party 민주당
- Abbreviation: DP; Little Democrats (unofficial)
- Founded: 15 June 1990
- Dissolved: 16 September 1991
- Merged into: Democratic
- Ideology: Liberalism (South Korea); Centrist reformism
- Political position: Centre
- Colours: Red

The Democratic Party (Korean: 민주당) was a political party of South Korea from 1990 to 1991. The party was often called as Little Democrats (꼬마민주당) due to its minority status.

== History ==
The party was formed by the former members of the Reunification Democratic Party (UDP), who opposed the party's merger with the ruling Democratic Justice Party (DJP) and New Democratic Republican Party (NDRP). After UDP declared its combination with DJP and NDRP on 22 January 1990, dissidents refused to join the newly formed Democratic Liberal Party. The dissidents, led by Lee Ki-taek, officially launched Democratic Party on 15 June. The day, the party held a leadership election, and elected Lee as its chairman.

However, due to the few seats in the National Assembly, the party subsequently initiated the combination with the main opposition, Peace Democratic Party (PDP), led by Kim Dae-jung (New Democratic Unionist Party aka NDUP since 15 April 1991). Lee stepped down as the chairman on 16 November, after the first attempt was failed. However, he then returned as the chairman on 3 February 1991, since no one could replace him.

The party faced a huge defeat in 1991 local elections, when DLP won majority. After that, the party initiated the 2nd negotiation with NDUP, and agreed on 11 September. 5 days later, both NDUP and DP was successfully combined and re-built as the new Democratic Party.

== Party leadership ==
=== Party Presidents ===
No.	President(s)	Period
1	Lee Ki-taek	15 June 1990 – 16 November 1990
	Kim Hyun-kyu (interim)	16 November 1990 – 3 February 1991
2	Lee Ki-taek	3 February 1991 – 16 September 1991

== Election results ==
=== Local ===
Election	Leader	Metropolitan mayor/Governor	Provincial legislature
1991	Lee Ki-taek	0 / 15	21 / 866
