= Lee Baek-yun =

South Korean activist (born 1977)

- 이백윤
- Born: 25 May 1977 (age 49); Dongja-dong, Yongsan, Seoul, South Korea
- Education: Chung-Ang University (expelled)
- Occupations: Activist, politician
- Political party: Labour

Korean name
- Hangul: 이백윤
- RR: I Baekyun
- MR: I Paegyun

Lee Baek-yun (Korean: 이백윤, born 25 May 1977) is a South Korean activist and socialist politician. He was the Labour Party presidential candidate at the 2022 presidential election.

== Career ==
Lee was born in 1977 and grew up in Goheung, South Jeolla. His father was a construction worker, and his mother used to work in various sectors, such as food caravans and restaurants.

As a secondary student, he read books about the Gwangju Uprising, which motivated him to be an activist. After graduation, he attended Chung-Ang University in 1996, where he studied Korean but was expelled. He led an occupy movement at the main building.

After finishing national service, Lee did not return to university, but applied to Donghee Auto Co. Ltd., where Kia Morning was produced, in 2005. As a temporary employee, he organised a trade union and fought for the rights of temporary workers. He was, however, fired for not mentioning his university background on his résumé. Another 21 employees that he worked with were also fired. He launched a struggle against the company's decision to dismiss him and his colleagues (including Park Yong-jin), which he claimed as "void". He was arrested and jailed for a year.

After being released from prison, Lee joined the Socialist Revolutionary Workers' Party (SRWP), a left-wing unregistered political party. He served as the SRWP South Chungcheong chairman.

=== 2022 presidential election ===
On 29 December 2021, Lee Baek-yun won Labour-SRWP unitary presidential primary, defeating Lee Gap-yong from the Labour Party. He became the Labour presidential candidate after the SRWP was merged into the Labour. His slogan is "Should we keep living like this? If you want to change, SOCIALISM."

== Election results ==
=== Presidential election ===
Year	Political party	Votes (%)	Remarks
2022	Labour	9,176 (0.03)	Lost
