= United Socialist Party of Korea =

1961–1967 political party in South Korea

United Socialist Party of Korea 통일사회당
- Leader: Kim Chul
- Founded: January 21, 1961
- Dissolved: 1967
- Headquarters: South Korea
- Newspaper: Minjok Ilbo
- Ideology: Social democracy Anti-October Yushin
- Political position: Centre-left to left-wing
- International affiliation: Socialist International

- United Socialist Party of Korea
- Hangul: 통일사회당
- Hanja: 統一社會黨
- RR: Tongil sahoedang
- MR: T'ongil sahoedang

The United Socialist Party (Korean: 통일사회당) was a Left-wing political party in South Korea. The party was founded in the spring of 1961, through the merger of two groups. The party was led by Kim Chul.

The newly founded party applied for membership in the Socialist International. The party was crushed after the 1961 military takeover of the country. It was banned, most of its leading members arrested and three of its leaders (two editors and a publisher of the party organ Minjok Ilbo) were sentenced to death.

The party was refounded at a congress in Seoul on September 20, 1966. At the time, the party was an observer member of the Socialist International. It claimed a membership of 17,500.
