= Cho Bong-am =

South Korean politician (1899–1959)

The Right Honourable Cho Bong-am
- 조봉암
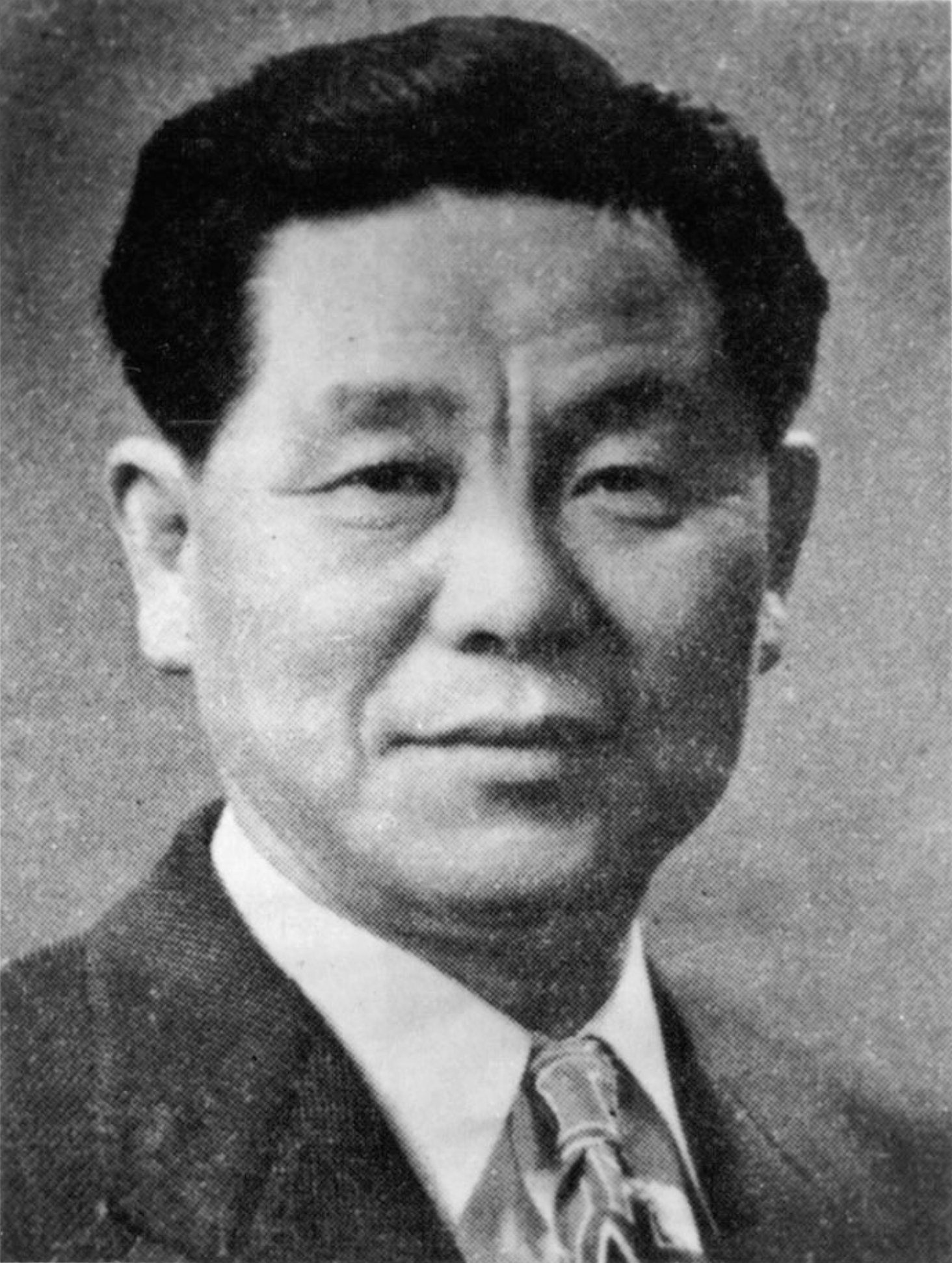

Member of the National Assembly
- In office 31 May 1948 – 30 May 1954
- Constituency: Incheon

Minister of Agriculture and Forestry
- In office 15 August 1948 – 22 February 1949

Personal details
- Born: 25 September 1898 Incheon, Korean Empire
- Died: 31 July 1959 (aged 60) Seodaemun Prison, Seoul, South Korea
- Party: Progressive
- Education: Communist University of the Toilers of the East

- Cho Bong-am
- Hangul: 조봉암
- Hanja: 曺奉岩
- RR: Jo Bongam
- MR: Cho Pongam

Cho Bong-am (Korean: 조봉암; Hanja: 曺奉岩, 25 September 1898 – 31 July 1959) was a Korean socialist independence activist and politician, who ran for president in the South Korean presidential election in 1956. He was a founding member of the Communist Party of Korea (조선공산당; 朝鮮共産黨) and the Progressive Party (진보당; 進步黨), a moderate socialist democratic party in South Korea which was one of the country's major political forces.

In 1919, Cho Bong-am participated in March 1st Movement and was imprisoned for the duration of one year. Cho Bong-am studied in Japan and the Soviet Union. In the 1920s, he was active in the Korean Communist Party. After Japanese rule, Cho left the Communist Party in 1946, criticising it for its subservience to the Soviet Union. After the end of the United States Army Military Government in Korea in 1947, Cho became the Minister of Agriculture under Syngman Rhee's presidency.

In 1952, Cho ran for the presidency for the first time against sitting president Rhee, and Yi Si-yeong. He received only 0.8 million votes out of 5.2 million.

The left-liberal Progressive Party was founded in the aftermath of the Korean War under Cho's leadership. Cho and his followers were able to build a wide coalition with the country's leftist forces. Cho also successfully created coalitions with right-wing forces opposed to Syngman Rhee's dictatorship. The party's founding and moderate success in Korea's hostile political environment is considered a large result of Bong-am's personal charisma. The Progressive Party advocated peaceful unification with North Korea, through strengthening the country's democratic forces and winning in a unified Korean election. Cho called for both anti-communist and anti-authoritarian politics, as well as advocating for social welfare policies for the peasants and urban poor.

In the 1956 election, Cho ran against Rhee, the anti-communist strongman president. Cho lost with 30% of the vote, which exceeded expectations. Following the election, the Progressive Party broke apart due to factionalism.

Three years after the election, Cho was charged with espionage and receiving funds from North Korea. His first trial resulted in an acquittal but he was convicted in a second trial and was executed on 31 July 1959. His death sentence was posthumously overturned in 2011 by the South Korean Supreme Court.
