= Arbeit Workers Union =

South Korean trade union

- Hangul: 아르바이트 노동조합
- Hanja: 아르바이트 勞動組合
- RR: Areubaiteu nodongjohap
- MR: Arŭbait'ŭ nodongjohap

Short name
- Hangul: 알바노조
- Hanja: 알바勞組
- RR: Albanojo
- MR: Albanojo

The Arbeit Workers Union (Korean: 아르바이트 노동조합; AWU), also abbreviated to Albanojo (Korean: 알바노조, literally Arbeit Union), is a trade union of part-time workers called "Areubaiteu" (from German: Arbeit, lit. 'work') in South Korea. The AWU was founded in August 2013.
