= Moon Myung-soon =

South Korean politician

Moon Myung-soon (Korean: 문명순; Hanja: 文明順; 18 October 1962), also known as Moon Myoung-soon, is a South Korean politician based in Goyang.

== Career ==
After graduating Seoul Girls' Commercial High School, Moon had worked at Kookmin Bank for three decades. From 2008 to 2011 she led the biggest trade union of Federation of Korean Trade Unions, National Financial industry labour union (Korean: 전국금융산업노동조합), as its senior vice president. Moon holds three degrees - a bachelor in business administration from Korea National Open University, an LLM from Kyung Hee University and a master's in economics from Sogang University.

In the 2012 election, Moon was placed as the number 23 of the proportional representation list of her party but failed to be elected. In 2020 election, Moon ran for the constituency in Goyang represented by Sim Sang-jung from 2012. Although they were neck and neck in the opinion polls, Moon was defeated by Sim who, according to Moon, has not done anything for the constituency but being the loud mouth and would not be supportive of making Moon Jae-in administration successful.

Moon previously worked for Moon Jae-in's presidential campaigns as the chair of special committee for Financial Economy in 2012 and Financial Consumer Protection in 2017. She is now an advisor to government finance institutions - Korea Deposit Insurance Corporation and Korea Inclusive Finance Agency - and a special member of Presidential Committee for Balanced National Development. She is well known to party members for greeting then-former party leader Moon Jae-in at the Incheon International Airport by herself when he returned to Seoul from Himalayas in 2016.

From 2019 Moon has served as one of vice chairs of Policy Planning Committee of Democratic Party and a member of financial stability task force of its COVID-19 committee.

== Electoral history ==
Election	Year	District	Party affiliation	Votes	Percentage of votes	Results
19st National Assembly General Election	2012	Proportional representation	Democratic Party	7,777,123	36.45%	Lost
21st National Assembly General Election	2020	Gyeonggi Goyang A	Democratic Party	39,268	27.36%	Lost
