= Sim Sang-jung =

South Korean politician (born 1959)

- 심상정
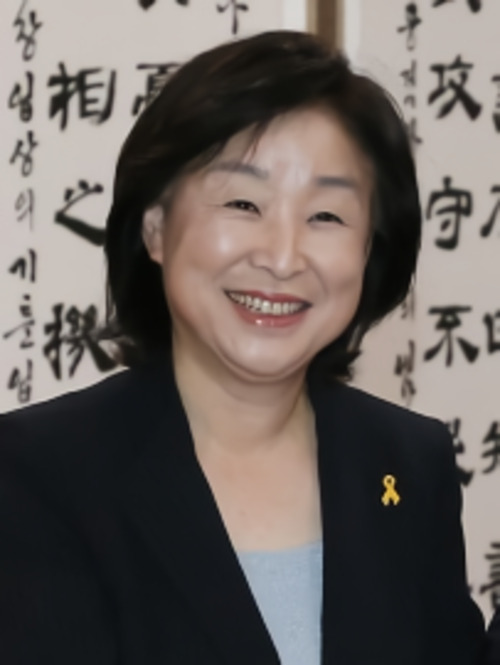
- Sim Sang-jung in 2015

Member of the National Assembly
- In office 30 May 2012 – 29 May 2024
- Preceded by: Son Beom Gyu
- Succeeded by: Kim Sung-hoi
- Constituency: Gyeonggi Goyang A
- In office 30 May 2004 – 29 May 2008
- Constituency: Proportional representation

Leader of the Justice Party
- In office 18 July 2015 – 11 July 2017
- Preceded by: Cheon Ho-sun
- Succeeded by: Lee Jeong-mi
- In office 13 July 2019 – 12 October 2020
- Preceded by: Lee Jeong-mi
- Succeeded by: Kim Jong-cheol

Personal details
- Born: 20 February 1959 (age 67) P'aju, Kyonggi Province, South Korea
- Party: Justice Party
- Other political affiliations: Democratic Labor Party (2000–2008); New Progressive Party (2008–2011); Solidarity for New Progressive Integration (2008); Unified Progressive Party (2011–12)
- Education: Seoul National University

Korean name
- Hangul: 심상정
- Hanja: 沈相奵
- RR: Sim Sangjeong
- MR: Sim Sangjŏng

Sim Sang-jung (Korean: 심상정; born 20 February 1959) is a South Korean labor rights activist and former politician. She was one of the five major presidential candidates in the 2017 South Korean presidential election, running as the Justice Party's nominee. She again ran as the Justice Party's nominee in the 2022 presidential election, finishing in 3rd place.

She has been a member of the National Assembly since 2012, having previously served from 2004 to 2008, and was the leader of the Justice Party from 2015 to 2017 and 2019 to 2020. She announced her retirement from politics following the 2024 legislative election, effective at the end of the National Assembly's term on 29 May.

== Education and early career ==
Sim obtained her bachelor's degree in education from Seoul National University. She switched degrees from history, with the aspiration to become a history teacher.

At the age of 21, she worked at a cassette tape factory where her days as a labor rights activist began. Sim was subsequently fired for mobilizing workers to demand higher wages and better meals. She "hopped from job to job" to earn a wage but continued her labor activism. In 1985, she was on the country's most wanted list for instigating labor strikes. She was on the list for 9 years, and married her husband, a fellow activist, during that time. She was formally charged for 'instigation of mass harm' and 'instigation of arson', and was sentenced to 1.5 years imprisonment, but a 2-year suspended sentence, soon after she became pregnant.

== Political career ==
Sim was first elected in 2004 in the 17th National Assembly as a member of the Democratic Labor Party. She won her first direct election in the 19th National Assembly as a member of the UPP with 49.37% of the votes in an area of Gyeonggi Goyang in 2012.

Following the disintegration of the Unified Progressive Party after the Park Geun-hye government's petition to the Constitutional Court of Korea for the UPP's alleged pro-North Korean views in 2013, Sim helped found the Justice Party. She was elected party chair in 2015. Sim won another seat in the 20th National Assembly in 2016, again in an area of Goyang with 53% of the vote. In the 2020 election, she defeated Moon Myung-soon from Democratic Party and Lee Kyung-hwan from the United Future Party, becoming the first four-term parliamentarian from a progressive party in Korea. She announced her retirement from politics following the 2024 legislative election after the Justice Party failed to win seats for the first time since its foundation.

== Political positions and ideology ==
=== Economy ===
Her economic positions reflect the progressive platform of the Justice Party. This includes reforming chaebols (Korean conglomerates) so that hereditary succession is banned. Her key policy in the 2022 South Korean election was the proposal of a four-day work week, which has been described as "a revolutionary idea in a country where workers endure notoriously long hours".

=== Social issues ===
In the 2017 South Korean presidential election, Sim was the only major presidential candidate to openly support LGBT rights in South Korea.

=== National security ===
Sim opposes the deployment of THAAD, a U.S. anti ballistics missile defense system, and supports a nuclear-free Korean Peninsula.

=== Feminism ===
Sim self-identifies as a feminist. She has said that, "Sexism clearly exists in South Korean society". Polling in the 2022 South Korean presidential election suggested her strongest support came from women in their 20s. Vladimir Tikhonov, professor of Korean studies at the University of Oslo, has said that some younger women consider her a hero for what he describes as being able to "articulate the women's rights agenda".

== Election results ==
Year	Elections	Constituency	Political party	Votes (%)	Results
2004	17th National Assembly General Election	Proportional representation (1st)	DLP	2,774,061 (13.03%)	Elected
2008	18th National Assembly General Election	Goyang Deogyang A (Gyeonggi)	NPP	25,049 (37.67%)	Defeated (2nd)
2010	5th Iocal Election	Gyeonggi (Governoral Elections)	NPP	–	Resigned
2012	19th National Assembly General Election	Goyang Deogyang A (Gyeonggi)	UPP	43,928 (49.37%)	Won
2016	20th National Assembly General Election	Goyang A (Gyeonggi)	Justice	71,043 (52.97%)	Won
2017	2017 Presidential Election	South Korea	Justice	2,017,458 (6.17%)	Defeated (5th)
2020	21st National Assembly General Election	Goyang A (Gyeonggi)	Justice	56,516 (39.38%)	Won
2022	2022 Presidential Election	South Korea	Justice	803,358 (2.37%)	Defeated (3rd)
2024	22nd National Assembly General Election	Goyang A (Gyeonggi)	Green Justice	28,293 (18.41%)	Defeated (3rd)
