= Lee Jae-oh =

South Korean politician

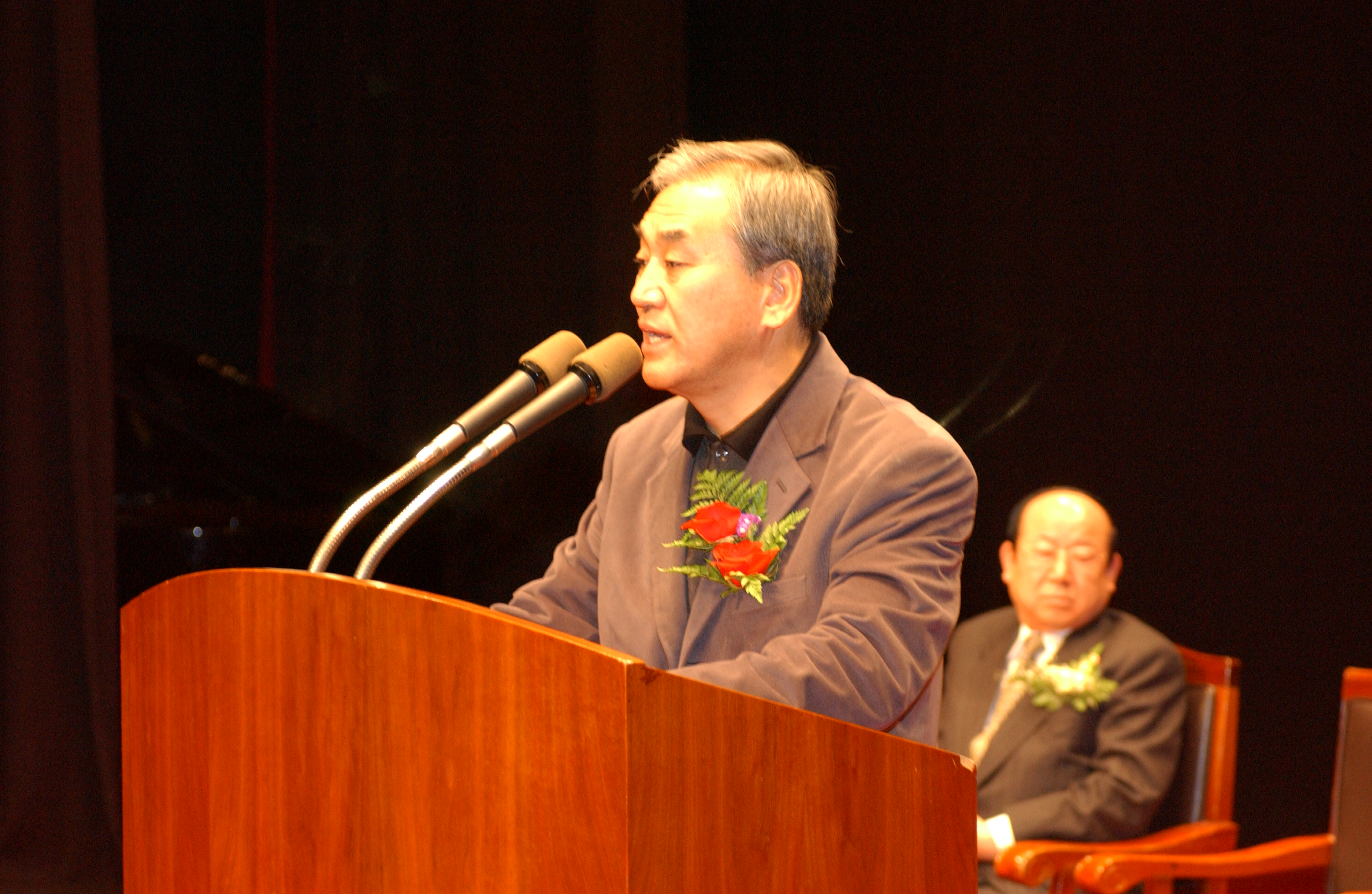
- Lee Jae-oh in 2003

Korean name
- Hangul: 이재오
- Hanja: 李在五
- RR: I Jaeo
- MR: I Chaeo

Lee Jae-oh (Korean: 이재오; born 11 January 1945) is a conservative South Korean politician of the People Power Party. He was member of the National Assembly for Eunpyeong B, Seoul, and served as Minister for Government Legislation and Special Affairs in Lee Myung-bak's administration. He is regarded as a close associate of Lee Myung-bak, and ran unsuccessfully as a candidate for the Saenuri nomination in the 2012 presidential election.

== Election results ==
Year	Elections	Constituency	Political party	Votes (%)	Results
1992	14th National Assembly General Election	Eunpyeong B (Seoul)	Popular	21,716 (17.42%)	Defeated (4th)
1996	15th National Assembly General Election	Eunpyeong B (Seoul)	NKP	48,146 (43.63%)	Won
2000	16th National Assembly General Election	Eunpyeong B (Seoul)	GNP	53,121 (51.04%)	Won
2004	17th National Assembly General Election	Eunpyeong B (Seoul)	GNP	53,107 (45.25%)	Won
2008	18th National Assembly General Election	Eunpyeong B (Seoul)	GNP	38,164 (40.81%)	Defeated (2nd)
2010	2010 By-election	Eunpyeong B (Seoul)	GNP	48,311 (58.33%)	Won
2012	19th National Assembly General Election	Eunpyeong B (Seoul)	Saenuri	63,238 (49.51%)	Won
2016	20th National Assembly General Election	Eunpyeong B (Seoul)	Independent	34,318 (29.52%)	Defeated (2nd)
2017	2017 Presidential Election	South Korea	EKP	9,140 (0.02%)	Defeated (12nd)
