= Socialist Revolutionary Workers' Party =

2016–2022 political party in South Korea

Socialist Revolutionary Workers' Party 사회변혁노동자당
- Abbreviation: Revolutionary Party (변혁당)
- Leader: Yi Jong-hoe
- Founded: January 31, 2016
- Dissolved: February 5, 2022
- Preceded by: Promotion Committee for Revolutionary On-site Practice and Working Class Party
- Merged into: Labor Party
- Headquarters: Changsin Building, 602-127, Yeongdeungpo-dong, Yeongdeungpo District, Seoul
- Newspaper: Revolutionary Politics
- Student wing: Committee on Student
- Ideology: Socialism; Anti-war; Anti-capitalism; Anti-imperialism
- Political position: Left-wing to far-left
- Colors: Red

Party flag

Website
- rp.jinbo.net
- Politics of South Korea; Political parties; Elections; A: The SRWP opposes imperialism, but does not support left-wing nationalism, and advocates the view of Proletarian internationalism.

- Socialist Revolutionary Workers' Party
- Hangul: 사회변혁노동자당
- Hanja: 社會變革勞動者黨
- RR: Sahoe byeonhyeok nodongjadang
- MR: Sahoe pyŏnhyŏk nodongjadang

The Socialist Revolutionary Workers' Party (Korean: 사회변혁노동자당) was an unregistered political party in South Korea.

On 5 February 2022, the Socialist Revolutionary Worker's Party agreed to merge into the Labor Party in order to create a unified socialist party in Korea, as well as assisting unified candidate Lee Baek-yun in the 2022 presidential election.

== Leadership ==
=== Leaders of the Socialist Revolutionary Workers' Party ===
- Leader (January 31, 2016 – January 21, 2017)
  - Yi Jong-hoe
- Co-representative (January 22, 2017 – present)
  - Yi Jong-hoe
  - Jo Hui-ju
