= Hong Sehwa =

South Korean politician (1947–2024)

- 홍세화
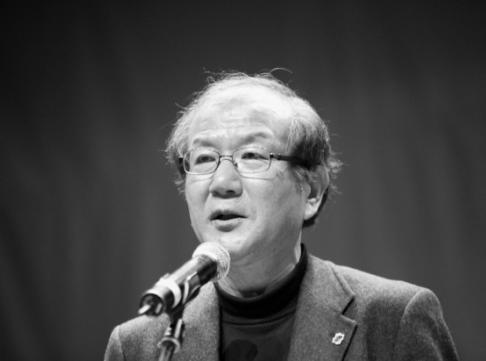
- Hong in 2012
- Born: 10 December 1947; Seoul, US-occupied Korea
- Died: 18 April 2024 (aged 76)
- Education: Seoul University (1966–1967, 1969–1977)
- Organization: Preparatory Committee for Collective Action for Basic Income (2014–)
- Notable work: Korean Le Monde diplomatique (2010–); Outsider (2000–2005)
- Title: New Progressive Party: Delegate (2011–2012); Co-representative (2012)
- Predecessor: Cho Seung-soo
- Successor: Kim Il-ung
- Political party: Labor Party (2013–); New Progressive Party (2008–2013); Democratic Labor Party (2002–2008)
- Awards: Democratic Citizen Media Award (2002)

Korean name
- Hangul: 홍세화
- Hanja: 洪世和
- RR: Hong Sehwa
- MR: Hong Sehwa
- Website: www.hongsehwa.pe.kr

Hong Sehwa (Korean: 홍세화; Hanja: 洪世和; 10 December 1947 – 18 April 2024) was a South Korean journalist and New Progressive Party delegate. He was known as a representative South Korean socialist. Hong criticised imperialism and nationalism, according to the socialist perspective.

== Political views ==
Hong evaluated that both extreme right-wing anti-North Korean statist "conservatives" and anti-Japanese nationalist "liberals" are [anti-socialist] conservatives, and that true progressives or leftists have never had a government in South Korean politics.

Hong Sehwa was critical of South Korean liberals' anti-Japanese nationalism. He saw liberals using radical rhetoric that appears to be anti-imperialist on the outside, ironically curbing the growth of the South Korean socialist movement. He thought neither Japanese conservative-nationalists nor South Korean liberal-nationalists speak for the working class.

He took the view that the term "Japanese imperialism" was somewhat exaggerated by liberals, and liberals compromise with chaebol for anti-Japanese nationalistic reasons. He also took a critical view of the fact that South Korean [mainly DPK] liberals never criticize American imperialism. South Korean socialists criticize American imperialism, that Japanese nationalism is encouraged by the United States to keep China in check. (Note: By 21st century standards, South Korean [non-Juche] socialists do support anti-imperialism, but not support "resistance [anti-Japanese] Korean nationalism". Therefore, The South Korean socialists view that Japanese imperialism has been extinguished since 1945, and they believe that right-wing Japanese nationalistic move to revise Article 9 of the Japanese Constitution and strengthen its military power in the 21st century is not [Japanese] imperialism, but part of the American imperialist project to check China. In contrast, South Korean liberals who support Korean nationalism, they accuse post-1945 Japan of "Japanese imperialism" as well. However, South Korean [mainly DPK] liberals do not criticize American imperialism because they believe that the United States freed the Korea from Japanese colonial rule and protected the South Korea from communist aggression.)

In 2022, Hong joined the Green Party Korea, making him a dual member of Green Party and the Labor Party.

Hong died from cancer on 18 April 2024, at the age of 76.

== See also ==
- Pak Noja

== Notes ==
Party political offices
Preceded by Kim Hye-kyoung as Leader of Emergency Response Commission	Leader of the New Progressive Party; 2011–2012	Succeeded by Hong Sehwa; An Hyo-sang as Co-representative of the 4th delegation
Preceded by Hong Sehwa as leader of the 4th delegation	Co-representative of the New Progressive Party; 2012	Succeeded by Kim Il-ung as Leader of Emergency Response Commission
