= Popular Party (South Korea) =

1990–1992 political party in South Korea

Popular Party 민중당
- Abbreviation: PP
- Founded: 10 November 1990
- Dissolved: 23 March 1992
- Succeeded by: Progressive Political Alliance
- Ideology: Progressivism (South Korean); Social democracy; Democratic socialism
- Political position: Centre-left to left-wing

The Popular Party (Korean: 민중당; RR: Minjungdang) was a left-wing political party of South Korea from 1989 to 1992.

== History ==
A part of socialist movements in the late 1980s, the party was formed by the former members of the Hankyoreh Democratic Party (HDP) and the Party of the People (PotP). The HDP, which was originally formed in 1988, lost its sole elected representative, Park Hyung-oh, and kept declining. The PotP was also in difficulties with its minority status. This environment stimulated the pan-alliance of left-wings.

The party was founded on 10 November 1989 with its unofficial name, Preparation Group for the Establishment of Progressive Popular Party (진보적 대중정당 건설을 위한 준비모임), and officially formed on 10 November 1990 as Popular Party. That day, they also elected Lee Woo-jae as its Permanent President, Kim Sang-ki and Kim Nak-joong as the Co-Presidents, Jang Gi-pyo as the Chairman of Policy, and Lee Jae-oh as the Secretary-General.

During the 1991 local elections, 42 candidates ran under the PP banner but only 1 (Sung Hui-jik) was elected. In the 1992 election, 51 were running, and no one was elected. The party was immediately deregistered under the electoral law.

Many of members changed their ideology to right. Notable figures i.e. Kim Moon-soo, Lee Jae-oh, and Cha Myong-jin, later joined the right-wing Democratic Liberal Party. Lee Woo-jae, who was also one of them, later joined Uri Party, but subsequently retired. Only few members including Roh Hoe-chan, remained as left.

== Policies ==
The party advocated planned economy, and sought for the nationalisation of industries, financial institutions, natural resources, and land. It also supported the labour policies of Swedish Social Democratic Party.

The party refused to merge with Democratic Party, although they considered about electoral alliances.

=== 1992 election manifestos ===
The party announced its 15 manifestos for 1992 election.

- Limit the personal stock ownership to maximum 5%
- Reduce the period of national service till 18 months (= 1.5 years)
- Nationalisation of land
- Introduction of real-name financial transaction system
- Application of public operating system for bus, and private ownership of taxis
- Abolition of the National Security Act
- Allow political activities for trade unions
- Open ballot system for general election
- Two-round system for presidential election
- Increase domestic spending by 20% for welfare system
- Protect agricultural industry and allow co-operative
- Stop the streamlining of coal industry, and public corporatisation of coal mine
- Gender equality and introduction of Anti-Sexual Harassment Act
- Reinstatement of teachers from KTU and the expansion of compulsory education
- Harsher penalties for environmental pollution and build nuclear plants by referendum

== Election results ==
=== Legislature ===
| Election | Leader | Votes | % | Seats | | | Position | Status |
| Election | Leader | Votes | % | Constituency | Party list | Total | Position | Status |
|---|---|---|---|---|---|---|---|---|
| 1992 | Kim Sang-ki; Kim Nak-joong | 319,041 | 1.55 | 0 / 237 | 0 / 62 | 0 / 299 | 5th | Extra-parliamentary |

=== Local ===
| Election | Leader | Metropolitan mayor/Governor | Provincial legislature |
|---|---|---|---|
| 1991 | Collective leadership | 0 / 15 | 1 / 866 |
