= Labor Party (South Korea) =

Labor Party 노동당
- Leader: Lee Baek-yun, Go Yu-mi
- Secretary-General: Jeong Sang-cheon
- Vice Leader: Kim Seong-bong
- Chair of the Policy Planning Committee: Jang Hye-kyung
- Founded: 2013
- Merger of: Socialist Revolutionary Workers' Party; (2022)
- Preceded by: New Progressive Party
- Headquarters: Hanheung Building, 29-28, Yeongdeungpo-dong 7-ga, Yeongdeungpo District, Seoul
- Newspaper: Letter from the Future
- Youth wing: Committee on Youth and Students
- Membership (December 2020): 11,045
- Ideology: Progressivism (South Korean); Democratic socialism; Until 2021: Social democracy
- Political position: Left-wing; Until 2021: Centre-left to left-wing
- Colors: Red
- National Assembly: 0 / 300

Website
- laborparty.kr

- Labor Party
- Hangul: 노동당
- Hanja: 勞動黨
- RR: Nodongdang
- MR: Nodongdang

The Labor Party (Korean: 노동당) is a democratic socialist political party in South Korea.

== History ==
After the New Progressive Party and the Socialist Party voted to unite in 2012, the Labor Party was officially formed the following year. It held its interim party congress on 21 July 2013.

On 5 February 2022, it was announced that the unregistered Socialist Revolutionary Workers' Party agreed to merge with the Labor Party in order to create a unified socialist vision for the 2022 South Korean presidential election under candidate Lee Baek-yoon.

Since 2025, the Labor Party has been working in solidarity with the Justice Party and Green Party, creating Korea's version of a left-wing traffic light coalition. The Labor Party announced in early 2025 that they would join the alliance, forming the traffic light coalition. Since the impeachment of President Yoon Suk-yeol triggered a Presidential Election, the three progressive parties have announced that they will field a joint candidate.

== Ideologies and political positions ==
The Labor Party is a political party led by the Minjungminju (PD) faction, a non-nationalist left-wing tendency. The Labor Party officially supports "definitely left-wing politics", "environmentalism" and "democratic socialism". LP also showed a centre-left social democratic character until it absorbed the Socialist Revolutionary Workers' Party. Major Labor politicians are critical of "liberal politics" (mainly seen in the Democratic, Justice, and Progressive parties), and hold that true progressivism is only possible through socialism. LP envisions the realization of "socialist politics" beyond 'left-liberal politics' and 'conservative politics' that have dominated South Korean politics.

A Labor Party major politician, Lee Gap-yong (Korean: 이갑용; Hanja: 李甲用), has critiqued the Progressive Party and Justice Party for not being truly "progressive". According to him, the Progressive Party, classified as far-left in the South Korean political context, has "given up" socialism. Unlike the Progressive Party, the Labor Party is not classified as far-left because it has a critical tendency toward North Korea.

== Leadership ==
- Hong Sehwa and An Hyo-sang, 2012
- Kim Jong-cheol, 2012 (acting)
- Kim Il-ung, 2012–2013
- Lee Yong-gill, 2013–2015
- Na Gyung-che, 2015
- Choe Seung-hyeon, 2015 (acting)
- Kim Sang-cheol, 2015
- Koo Kyo-hyun, 2015–2016
- Kim Gang-ho, 2016 (acting)
- Lee Gap-yong, 2016–2018
- Na Do-won, 2018–2019 (acting)
- Shin Ji-hye, Yong Hye-in, 2019
- Hyun Lin, 2019 (acting)
- Hyun Lin, 2019–2021
- Na Do-won, 2021–2022
- Na Do-won, Yi Jong-hoe, 2022–present

== Election results ==
=== President ===
Election	Candidate	Votes	%	Result
2022	Lee Baek-yun	9,176	0.03	Not elected

=== Legislature ===
Election	Leader	Constituency				Party list				Seats		Position	Status
Election	Leader	Votes	%	Seats	+/-	Votes	%	Seats	+/-	No.	+/–	Position	Status
2016	Koo Kyo-hyun	46,949	0.2	0 / 253	new	91,705	0.39	0 / 47	new	0 / 300	new	▲11th	Extra-parliamentary
2020	Hyun-lin	15,752	0.05	0 / 253	0	34,272	0.12	0 / 47	0	0 / 300	0	▼19th	Extra-parliamentary
2024	Na Do-won	7,465	0.03	0 / 253	0	25,937	0.09	0 / 47	0	0 / 300	0	19th	Extra-parliamentary

=== Local ===
Election	Leader	Metropolitan mayor/Governor	Provincial legislature	Municipal mayor	Municipal legislature
2014		0 / 17	1 / 789	0 / 226	6 / 2,898
2018		0 / 17	0 / 789	0 / 226	0 / 2,898

== Images ==
Headquarters and Seoul bureau building of the Labor Party in 2018

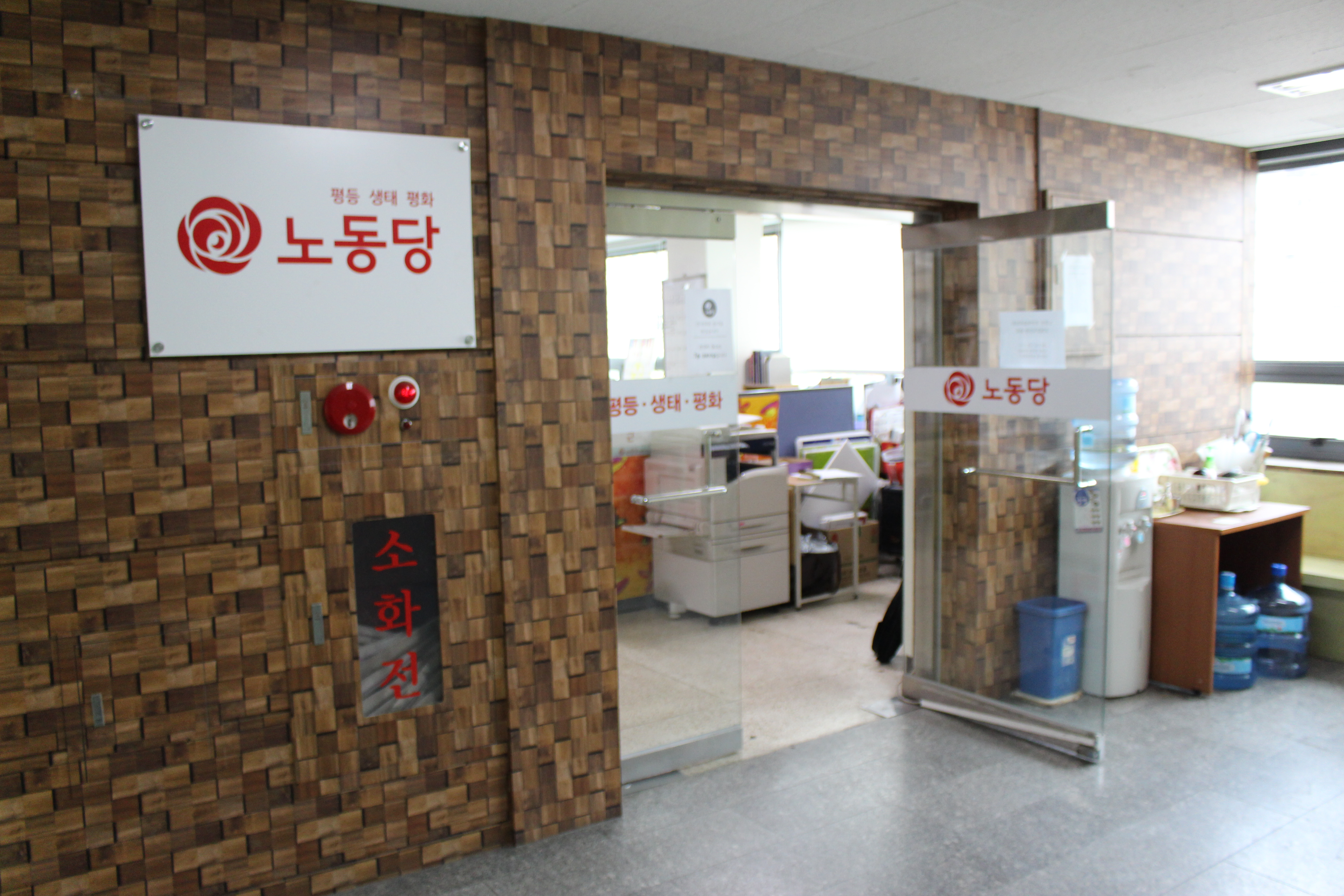
Headquarters and Seoul bureau building of the Labor Party in 2018

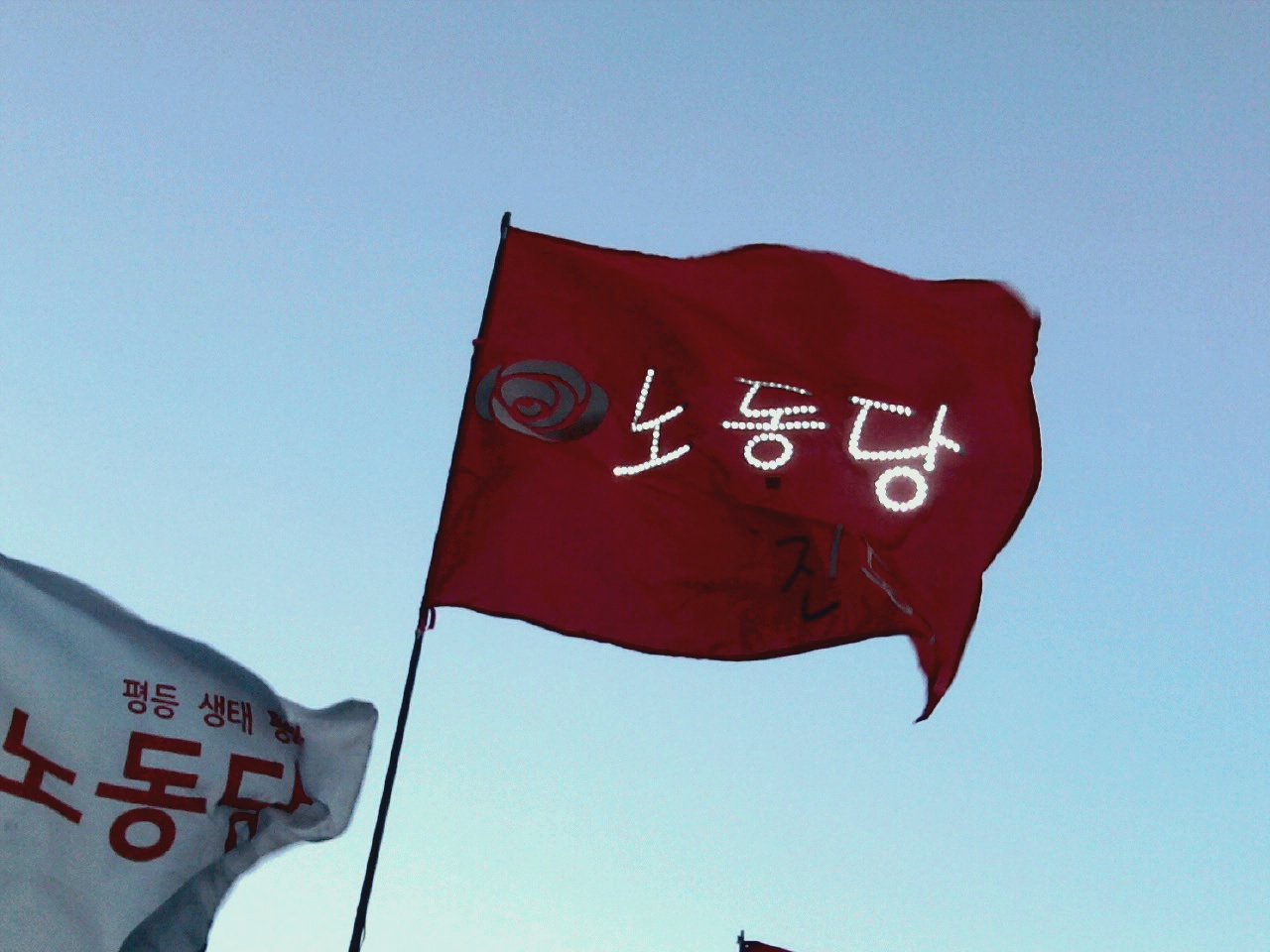
Party flag being flown the Korean Confederation of Trade Unions General Strike in 2013

Simplified logo of the Labor Party

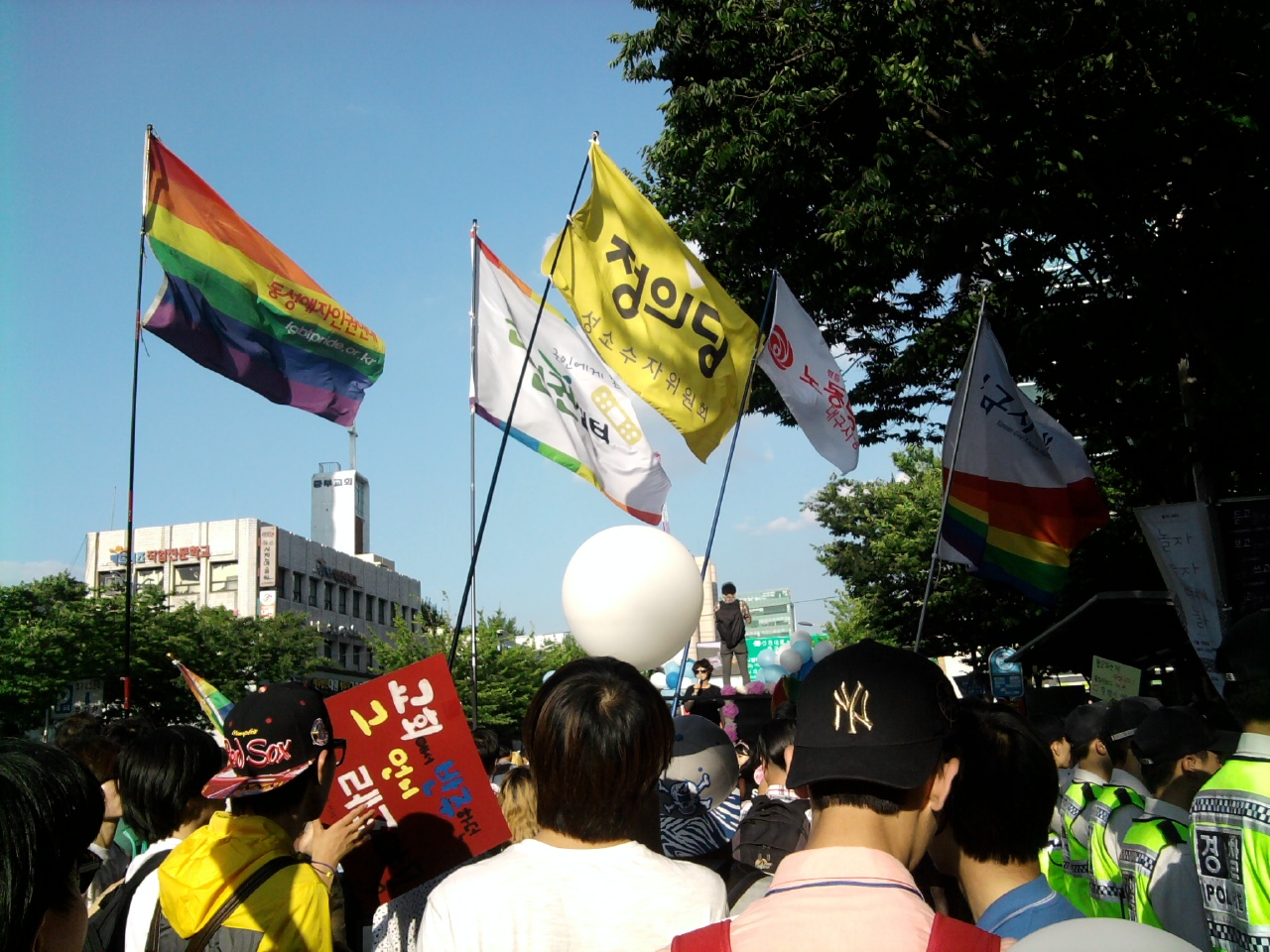
Labor Party at Daegu LGBT Pride Parade

== See also ==
- Pak Noja
- Park Eun-ji
- Progressivism in South Korea
- Socialism in South Korea
- Progressive Gathering+
- Justice Party (South Korea)
- Basic Income Party
