= Socialist Party (South Korea) =

1998–2012 political party in South Korea

Socialist Party 사회당
- President: Ahn Hyo-sang
- Founded: 29 November 1998
- Dissolved: 4 March 2012
- Merged into: New Progressive Party
- Headquarters: 11F Nagyeong Building, 115-62 Gongdeok-dong, Mapo-gu, Seoul
- Ideology: Social democracy
- Political position: Centre-left to left-wing
- Colours: Red, Black and Green

- Socialist Party
- Hangul: 사회당
- Hanja: 社會黨
- RR: Sahoedang
- MR: Sahoedang

The Socialist Party (SP; Korean: 사회당) was a minor left-wing political party in South Korea, founded in 1998. It advocated an ideology of socialism, social republicanism, peace and environmentalism.

On 19 February 2012, at its final Sixteenth Party Congress, the Socialist Party voted by 404 votes to 54 to merge with the New Progressive Party. The party was formally dissolved on 4 March 2012.

== History ==
The People's Victory 21 (Korean: 국민승리21) party (the later DLP) was formed in preparation for the presidential election of 1997. This was an attempt to unite South Korean progressives in a single party, but dissenting progressives who focused on class struggle argued that there was an excess of nationalism in the VoP21 platform. As an example, they pointed to the slogan of Kwon Young-ghil, VoP21's presidential candidate, "Stand up, Korea!" (Korean: "일어나라 코리아!"). After the election, these dissenting progressives formed the "Youth Progressive Party" (Korean: 청년진보당).

The Youth Progressive Party ran for election to the National Assembly in the Guro-gu local constituency, and attained 4.1% of the votes cast. In August 2001, the party changed its name to "Socialist Party" under the slogan "Against Capitalism, Against WPK", targeting certain nationalists known as the "NL" (National Liberation) faction within the Democratic Labor Party.

The party changed its name to "Hope Socialist Party" (Korean: 희망사회당) in April 2006, and to "Korea Socialist Party" (Korean: 한국사회당) in October 2006 due to the Korean law forbidding the usage of a party name for four years when registration is canceled.

In the 2008 parliamentary elections, the party amassed less than 3% of the vote, and the national election committee consequently canceled its registration. In November, the party re-registered with the name "Socialist Party".

== Elections ==
On several occasions, the party ran candidates for president or parliament, for example Kim Yeong-gyu in the 2002 presidential election, but it never won any elections.

For the 2007 presidential election, Geum Min ran as the party's candidate for president. He proposed the idea of social republicanism, subsequently adopted as a component of the party's platform.

== Election results ==
=== President ===
Election	Candidate	Votes	%	Result
2007	Geum Min	18,223	0.08	Not elected

=== Legislature ===
Election	Leader	Constituency				Party list				Seats		Position	Status
Election	Leader	Votes	%	Seats	+/-	Votes	%	Seats	+/-	No.	+/–	Position	Status
2004	Geum Min	8,004	0.04	0 / 243	new	47,311	0.22	0 / 56	new	0 / 299	new	9th	Extra-parliamentary
2008	Ahn Hyo-sang					35,496	0.21	0 / 54	Steady	0 / 299	Steady	11th	Extra-parliamentary

== See also ==
- List of political parties in South Korea
- Politics of South Korea
- Elections in South Korea
- Basic income
- Basic Income Party
- Progressivism in South Korea
