= Pak Noja =

Soviet South Korean academic (born 1973)

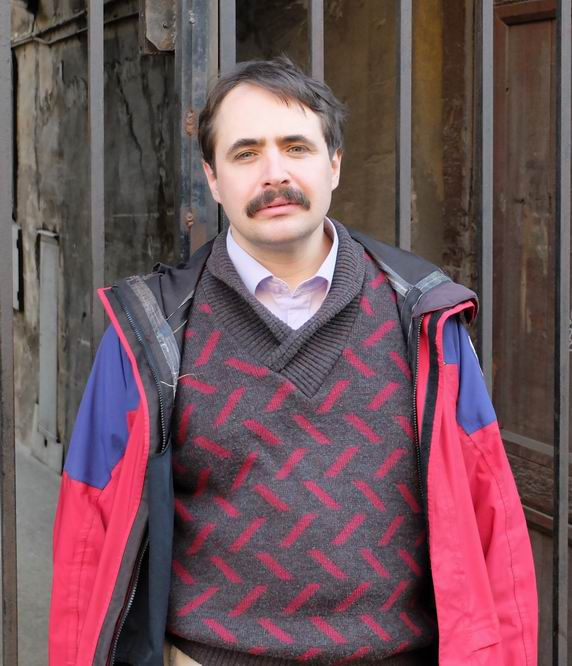
- Pak, photo by Yuri Khanon, 2014
- Born: Vladimir Tikhonov; February 5, 1973 (age 53); Leningrad, Soviet Union
- Other name: Volodja
- Education: Korean Studies, Leningrad (St.-Petersburg) State University; MA in Korean History Moscow State University (Institute of Asian and African Studies, International Centre for Korean Studies); PhD in Korean History
- Title: Professor of University of Oslo
- Political party: Labor Party, Red Party (Norway)
- Spouse: Paik Myong-jong
- Children: 2

Korean name
- Hangul: 박노자
- Hanja: 朴露子
- RR: Bak Noja
- MR: Pak Noja

Vladimir Tikhonov (Russian: Влади́мир Миха́йлович Ти́хонов, romanized: Vladimir Mikhaylovich Tikhonov; born on February 5, 1973), known mainly by his Korean art name Pak Noja (Korean: 박노자), is a Russian and Korean activist, historian, Koreanist, and writer.

== Biography ==
Pak was born to a Russian Jewish family in Leningrad, Soviet Union. His Russian name is Vladimir Tikhonov, but after immigrating to South Korea in 1997, he changed his name to a Korean name, Pak Noja, and became naturalised as a South Korean citizen in 2001.

Fascinated by Korean movies and classical literature during his high school years, he decided to study Korean history. At the age of sixteen, he entered the Department of Korean Studies at St. Petersburg National University of Russia, and he made his first visit to Korea as an exchange student in 1991, staying in Seoul for about three months.

After his bachelor's degree, Pak continued studying Korean history and was awarded a doctorate from Moscow State University for his thesis on Gaya, a confederation of city-states that lasted until the 6th century in the southern part of Korea.

While working on his degree, in 1992, Pak met a Korean violinist, Paik Myong-jong (백명정, born 1971), who was at that time studying at the Leningrad University of Russia; they married in 1995.

Pak worked on translating Korean literature into Russian and wrote several liberal arts and sociology books about Korean culture and politics, including his best-selling book, Your Korea (당신들의 대한민국). His writings made him known as one of Korea's influential progressive intellectuals, and brought on many controversial issues within Korea through sharp criticism.

Pak has taught Russian at Kyunghee University in Korea, and is currently teaching Korean studies as a professor at the Department of Culture Studies and Oriental Languages at the University of Oslo in Norway.

== Views ==
=== Statements on China ===
In 2009, Pak remarked that the "Korean economy will be annexed by the Chinese economic zone within 5–10 years". The Korean left responded critically to this claim, but Pak went on to clarify his thesis. According to his column, "it is not proper, I just said inescapable".

Moreover, he supported the Chinese government with respect to Liu Xiaobo's Nobel Peace Prize. Pak criticized Liu Xiaobo as a "follower of Western countries" and "a supporter of colonialism in China". According to Pak, "the process of democratization in China is not only elite, but also working-class".

Pak suggests that Liu's support in his Charter 08 of 'legislative democracy' and the 'protection of private property' raises doubts on whether "Liu Xiaobo wants a 'non-communist, dictatorial China' or a 'worker-friendly China'". Pak claims that "true reform must be undertaken by the working class".

Pak is critical about China's policy on Uyghur. In a column written in 2019 he argued "Policies against the Uyghur people, whose right to survive is threatened, are reminiscent of the national annihilation measures that the Korean people experienced at the end of the Japanese colonial period."

=== Statement about Ukraine War ===
He criticized some South Korean left nationalists for supporting the Russian invasion of Ukraine. In his column in the Hankyoreh, he argued, "The courage that Ukrainian citizens are demonstrating in their struggle against aggression will long provide inspiration for Russians, too!" He supports South Korea accepting Ukraine refugees however he is against South Korea's involvement in the conflict.

=== About Hamas-Israel War ===
He criticized Benjamin Netanyahu as a war criminal like Putin that should be punished and Israel as a criminal state that commits genocide worthy of being found guilty in an international court but he criticized some of the leftists in South Korea supporting Hamas. He said "Is this thoughtless siding with the far-right group Hamas really helpful in creating peace?"

== Bibliography ==
- Postwar World (전쟁 이후의 세계, 2024)
- Lectures on the History of the Russian Revolution(러시아 혁명사 강의, 2018)
- Your Korea 2 (당신들의 대한민국2, 2006)
- I Accuse of the Century of Violence (나는 폭력의 세기를 고발한다, 2005)
- The History which Betrayed Me (나를 배반한 역사, 2003)
- There are Right and Left but not High and Low (좌우는 있어도 위아래는 없다 (박노자의 북유럽 탐험), 2002)
- Your Korea 1 (당신들의 대한민국1, 2001)
- Imaginative Power Changing the 21st Century (6인 6색 21세기를 바꾸는 상상력, 2005)
- Surviving in a Swirl of the Great Powers (열강의 소용돌이에서 살아남기, 2005)
- Realization in My Early Days (젊은 날의 깨달음, 2005)
- The Age of Anxieties, in the Middle of Pain (불안의 시대 고통의 한복판에서, 2005)
- The Empire of a White Mask (하얀 가면의 제국 (오리엔탈리즘, 서구 중심의 역사를 넘어), 2003)
- Outsiders 6,8,10,12,13 (아웃사이더 6,8,10,12,13, 2002–2003)
- In the Front Line of Our History (우리 역사 최전선, 2003)
- Monuments of Deserters (탈영자들의 기념비, 2003)
