= New Progressive Party (South Korea) =

2008–2012 political party in South Korea

New Progressive Party 진보신당
- President: Hong Se-hwa (former)
- Founded: 16 March 2008; 22 October 2012 (re-form)
- Dissolved: 12 April 2012 (dissolution); 23 June 2013 (Labor Party)
- Merger of: Socialist Party
- Split from: Democratic Labor Party
- Succeeded by: Labor Party
- Headquarters: Daeha Building, 14-11 Yoido-dong, Youngdungpo-gu, Seoul
- Ideology: Progressivism (South Korean); Feminism (South Korean); Social democracy
- Political position: Centre-left to left-wing
- Colours: Red

Website
- newjinbo.org (archived)

- New Progressive Party
- Hangul: 진보신당
- Hanja: 進步新黨
- RR: Jinbosindang
- MR: Chinbosindang

The New Progressive Party (NPP; Korean: 진보신당) was a political party in South Korea. The New Progressive Party was established by a number of Democratic Labor Party members (known as 'People's Democracy Faction') who left the party in reaction to the dominating Minjokhaebang factions.

== History ==
The first party president was Roh Hoe-chan, who was elected at the 2004 Parliamentary election as a member of the Democratic Labor Party.

The NPP failed to take seats in the National Assembly in the 2008 general election, despite Roh Hoe-chan being expected to win a seat, being that he was winning in most of the pre-vote surveys.

In the 29 April 2009 by-election, the NPP looked to win a seat for the district of Ulsan based on its pro-Labor population statistics. The NPP nominated Cho Seung-soo, former AM in Ulsan Buk-gu, 2005. The NPP negotiated with the Democratic Labor Party to nominate the Progressive sole candidate before the beginning of the by-election. The NPP and DLP finally negotiated the nomination of the candidate Cho Seung-soo to run against the conservative candidates. In the by-election, Cho beat the GNP (Grand National Party) candidate and the NPP finally took one seat.

In the 2010 local government election of mayor of Seoul, NNP candidate Roh Hoe-chan received 3% of the vote. But, the Democratic Party's Han Myung-sook was just behind Oh Se-hoon for 1~2% so, whose supporters criticised him for not retiring.

In 2011, Democratic Labor Party suggested to merge, but in referendum of party members, the proposal failed with 50% approval. Cho Seung-soo left the party, thus the New Progressive Party lost one seat in the Korean National assembly. In December 2011, a faction of the NPP, led by Sim Sang-jeong, left to join the Unified Progressive Party.

In 2012, the New Progressive Party proposed to unite with the Socialist Party. The Socialist Party agreed to unity at its last party congress on 19 February 2012, with a vote of 93% in favour. Both parties held a unity ceremony on 4 March 2012.

Since NPP couldn't gain the 3% of proportional vote in 19th National Assembly Election held on 11 April 2012, party's status is now unregistered by South Korean law, which indicates which party couldn't gain 2% of votes in election will be deregistered automatically. Deregistration made the NPP to form a new party as a new leftist party which will represent Labor Party. On April 24, the party convened national committee (which now is private club level) and decided to form a 'New party forming committee', as the NPP was not allowed to use its current name until 2016.

== Political position ==
The NPP aims for social democracy. The NPP criticizes both liberal-nationalism (mostly Minjudang-wing) and leftist-nationalism (mostly Minjokhaebang-wing). In particular, the NPP showed a more hostile tendency than South Korean liberals when it comes to North Korea policy. For this reason, media in South Korea described the NPP as "anti-North Korean progressive".

The NPP officially advocated feminism from the party code. The NPP declared that it would become a "party for women", saying that there were not enough discourse on women's rights (including the DLP).

The NPP was also the most active in the South Korean progressive camp at the time in the issue of LGBT rights. The party ran the "Sexual Politics Committee" (성정치위원회). Especially in 2008, the NPP put forward the coming out lesbian as a candidate for the National Assembly. (This was the 'first' case in relatively conservative South Korean political standards compared to other developed countries.)

== Election results ==
=== Legislature ===
Election	Leader	Constituency				Party list				Seats		Position	Status
Election	Leader	Votes	%	Seats	+/-	Votes	%	Seats	+/-	No.	+/–	Position	Status
2008	Roh Hoe-chan; Sim Sang-jung; Park Kim Young-hee; Lee Doug-woo; Kim Seok-joon	229,500	1.33	0 / 245	new	504,466	2.94	0 / 54	new	0 / 299	new	7th	Extra-parliamentary
2012	Hong Se-hwa; An Hyo-sang	101,614	0.47	0 / 246	Steady	243,065	1.13%	0 / 54	Steady	0 / 300	Steady	6th	Extra-parliamentary

=== Local ===
Election	Leader	Metropolitan mayor/Governor	Provincial legislature	Municipal mayor	Municipal legislature
2010	Roh Hoe-chan	0 / 16	3 / 761	0 / 228	22 / 2,888

== See also ==
- Politics of South Korea
- Socialism in South Korea
- Liberal socialism - In particular, Chin Jung-kwon and Sim Sang-jung, who were key party members at the time, were criticized as "liberal" in a derogatory sense by authoritative left-wing intellectuals.
- List of political parties in South Korea
- LGBT rights in South Korea
- Socialist Party (South Korea)
- Justice Party (South Korea)
- Social Democratic Party (Japan) - NPP interacted with major Japanese social democrats and democratic socialist politicians, including Mizuho Fukushima.
