= Shin Dong-kun =

South Korean politician (born 1961)

- 신동근

Member of the National Assembly
- In office 30 May 2016 – 29 May 2024
- Preceded by: Lee Hak-jae (Seo–Ganghwa A, Incheon); Ahn Sang-soo (Seo–Ganghwa B, Incheon)
- Succeeded by: Lee Yong-woo (Seo B, Incheon); Mo Gyeong-jong (Seo C, Incheon)
- Constituency: Incheon Seo B

Vice Mayor for Political Affairs of Incheon Metropolitan City
- In office 20 June 2010 – 16 October 2011
- Governor: Song Young-gil, Mayor
- Preceded by: Hong Jong-il
- Succeeded by: Kim Jin-young

Personal details
- Born: 22 December 1961 (age 64) Hadong South Gyeongsang, South Korea
- Party: Democratic
- Education: Kyung Hee University; Seoul National University

Korean name
- Hangul: 신동근
- Hanja: 申東根
- RR: Sin Donggeun
- MR: Sin Tonggŭn

Shin Dong-kun (Korean: 신동근; born 22 December 1961) is a South Korean dentist-turned politician representing Incheon's Seo District at the National Assembly from 2016.

== Biography ==
=== Before entering politics ===
During his studies at Kyung Hee University, he led his university branch of student-organised group calling for the U.S. to stop providing legitimacy to authoritarian Chun Doo-hwan regime. In May 1985, this group even occupied American cultural center in Seoul. The prosecution service branded this group as "North Korean collaborators" defined by National Security Law. After spending in jail for a year and a half, Shin was pardoned and able to go back to continue his studies. In 2000 he was recognised as a person of distinguished service to the Republic for his participation in democracy movement.

After completing his first dentistry degree, Shin opened his own dental clinic in Seo District, Incheon in 1990.

=== Political career ===
Shin first entered politics upon suggestions made by Kim Geun-tae, senior figure of his party. After losing two elections in 2002 and 2004, he failed to earn his party's nomination for the same constituency for the 2008 general election.

From 2010 to 2011 he has served as the first deputy of newly elected Mayor of Incheon, Song Young-gil. He resigned for the 2012 general election but lost.

In the 2016 general election, conservative Ganghwa County merged with Jung District, Incheon to form a parliamentary constituency. This helped Shin to win his seat after 4 loses and to defeat former Deputy Prime Minister, five-term parliamentarian Hwang Woo-yea. He then took multiple roles in his party such as deputy chair of its Policy Planning Committee from 2016 to 2017 and deputy floor leader from 2018 to 2019.

In the 2020 general election, Shin won the seat by the biggest margin among 13 constituencies of Incheon becoming the only dentist to be elected. In June 2020 he criticised Gyeonggi Provincial Governor Lee Jae-myung for incorrectly branding COVID-19 emergency relief fund as Universal basic income and promoting UBI preferable to developing social safety net in addressing inequality.

In July 2020 Shin announced his campaign to become one of five elected member of his party's Supreme Council. In August 2020 he was elected as Supreme Council member for fixed term of 2 years receiving most votes after Kim Jong-min and Yeom Tae-young.

From September 2020 Shin chairs party's task force for political reforms.

=== Education ===
He holds two degrees in dentistry - D.M.D. from Kyung Hee University and a master's in dentistry from Seoul National University where he also completed his doctorate programme on dentistry. He is a Chonbuk Mechanical Technical High School graduate.

== Electoral history ==
Elections	Year	Constituency	Party affiliation	Votes	Percentage of votes	Results
2002 By-election	2002	Incheon Seo–Ganghwa B	Millennium Democratic Party	8,144	26.40%	Lost (2nd)
17th National Assembly General Election	2004	Incheon Seo–Ganghwa B	Uri Party	21,563	38.98%	Lost (2nd)
19th National Assembly General Election	2012	Incheon Seo–Ganghwa B	Democratic United Party	35,139	41.15%	Lost (2nd)
2015 By-election	2015	Incheon Seo–Ganghwa B	New Politics Alliance for Democracy	26,340	42.85%	Lost (2nd)
20th National Assembly General Election	2016	Incheon Seo B	Democratic Party of Korea	45,841	45.84%	Won
21st National Assembly General Election	2020	Incheon Seo B	Democratic Party of Korea	83,671	61.64%	Won
