= List of members of the National Assembly (South Korea), 2012–2016 =

The 19th session of the National Assembly of South Korea first convened on 30 May 2012, and was seated until 29 May 2016. Its members were first elected in the 2012 legislative election held on 11 April 2012. It was preceded by the 18th National Assembly of South Korea and succeeded by the 20th National Assembly of South Korea.

== Composition ==
As of 20 May 2016, there are four political parties represented in the National Assembly.

| Party | Seats | | | Percentage | Floor leader |
| Party | Constituency | Proportional | Total | Percentage | Floor leader |
|---|---|---|---|---|---|
| Saenuri Party | 118 | 27 | 145 | 48.3% | Won Yoo-chul |
| Minjoo Party | 83 | 20 | 103 | 34.3% | Lee Jong-kul |
| People's Party | 20 | 0 | 20 | 6.7% | Joo Seung-Yong |
| Justice Party | 1 | 4 | 5 | 1.7% | Jeong Jin-hoo |
| Minjoo Party | 1 | 0 | 1 | 0.3% | Shin Ki-nam |
| Independent | 17 | 0 | 17 | 5.7% | |
| Vacant | 6 | 3 | 9 | 3.0% | |
| Totals | 246 | 54 | 300 | 100.0% | |

↓
| 145 | 103 | 20 | 5 | 1 | 17 | 8 |
| S | M | P | J | M | I | V |

== Members ==
| Province/city | Constituency | Member | Party | |
| Province/city | Constituency | Member | At election | At term's end |
|---|---|---|---|---|
| Seoul | Jongno | Chung Sye-kyun | DUP | Democratic |
| Seoul | Jung | Chyung Ho-joon | DUP | People |
| Seoul | Yongsan | Chin Young | Saenuri | Democratic |
| Seoul | Seongdong A | Choi Jae-cheon | DUP | Independent |
| Seoul | Seongdong B | Hong Ihk-pyo | DUP | Democratic |
| Seoul | Gwangjin A | Kim Han-gil | DUP | People |
| Seoul | Gwangjin B | Choo Mi-ae | DUP | Democratic |
| Seoul | Dongdaemun A | Ahn Gyu-back | DUP | Democratic |
| Seoul | Dongdaemun B | Min Byung-doo | DUP | Democratic |
| Seoul | Jungnang A | Seo Young-kyo | DUP | Democratic |
| Seoul | Jungnang B | Park Hong-keun | DUP | Democratic |
| Seoul | Seongbuk A | You Seung-hee | DUP | Democratic |
| Seoul | Seongbuk B | Shin Gye-ryoon | DUP | Democratic |
| Seoul | Gangbuk A | Oh Young-sik | DUP | Democratic |
| Seoul | Gangbuk B | You Dae-won | DUP | Democratic |
| Seoul | Dobong A | In Jae-keun | DUP | Democratic |
| Seoul | Dobong B | Yoo Ihn-tae | DUP | Democratic |
| Seoul | Nowon A | Lee No-keun | Saenuri | Saenuri |
| Seoul | Nowon B | Woo Won-shik | DUP | Democratic |
| Seoul | Nowon C | Roh Hoe-chan (Note: Roh Hoe-chan was removed on 14 February 2013.) | UPP | PJP |
| Seoul | Nowon C | Ahn Cheol-soo (Note: Ahn Cheol-soo was by-elected on 24 April 2013, to succeed Roh Hoe-chan.) | Independent | People |
| Seoul | Eunpyeong A | Lee Mi-kyung | DUP | Democratic |
| Seoul | Eunpyeong B | Lee Jae-oh | Saenuri | Independent |
| Seoul | Seodaemun A | Woo Sang-ho | DUP | Democratic |
| Seoul | Seodaemun B | Chung Doo-un | Saenuri | Saenuri |
| Seoul | Mapo A | Noh Woong-rae | DUP | Democratic |
| Seoul | Mapo B | Jung Cheong-rae | DUP | Democratic |
| Seoul | Yangcheon A | Kil Jeong-woo | Saenuri | Saenuri |
| Seoul | Yangcheon B | Kim Yong-tae | Saenuri | Saenuri |
| Seoul | Gangseo A | Shin Ki-nam | DUP | Minjoo |
| Seoul | Gangseo B | Kim Sung-tae | Saenuri | Saenuri |
| Seoul | Guro A | Lee In-young | DUP | Democratic |
| Seoul | Guro B | Park Young-sun | DUP | Democratic |
| Seoul | Geumcheon | Rhee Mok-hee | DUP | Democratic |
| Seoul | Yeongdeungpo A | Kim Young-joo | DUP | Democratic |
| Seoul | Yeongdeungpo B | Shin Kyoung-min | DUP | Democratic |
| Seoul | Dongjak A | Jun Byung-hun | DUP | Democratic |
| Seoul | Dongjak B | Chung Mong-joon (Note: Chung Mong-joon resigned on 15 May 2014, to run in the 2014 Seoul mayoral election.) | Saenuri | Saenuri |
| Seoul | Dongjak B | Na Kyung-won (Note: Na Kyung-won was by-elected on 30 July 2014, to succeed Chung Mong-joon.) | Saenuri | Saenuri |
| Seoul | Gwanak A | Yoo Ki-hong | DUP | Democratic |
| Seoul | Gwanak B | Lee Sang-kyu (Note: Lee Sang-kyu was removed on 19 December 2014.) | UPP | UPP |
| Seoul | Gwanak B | Oh Shin-hwan (Note: Oh Shin-hwan was by-elected on 29 April 2015, to succeed Lee Sang-kyu.) | Saenuri | Saenuri |
| Seoul | Seocho A | Kim Hoe-sun | Saenuri | Saenuri |
| Seoul | Seocho B | Kang Seog-hoon (Note: Kang Seog-hoon resigned on 19 May 2016, upon being appointed as Senior Presidential Secretary for Economic Affairs.) | Saenuri | Saenuri |
| Seoul | Gangnam A | Shim Yoon-joe | Saenuri | Saenuri |
| Seoul | Gangnam B | Kim Jong-hoon | Saenuri | Saenuri |
| Seoul | Songpa A | Park In-sook | Saenuri | Saenuri |
| Seoul | Songpa B | Yoo Il-ho | Saenuri | Saenuri |
| Seoul | Songpa C | Kim Eul-dong | Saenuri | Saenuri |
| Seoul | Gangdong A | Shin Dong-woo | Saenuri | Saenuri |
| Seoul | Gangdong B | Shim Jae-kwon | DUP | Democratic |
| Busan | Jung–Dong | Chung Ui-hwa | Saenuri | Independent |
| Busan | Seo | Yoo Ki-June | Saenuri | Saenuri |
| Busan | Yeongdo | Lee Jae-kyun (Note: Lee Jae-kyun was removed on 14 February 2013.) | Saenuri | Saenuri |
| Busan | Yeongdo | Kim Moo-sung (Note: Kim Moo-sung was by-elected on 24 April 2013, to succeed Lee Jae-kyun.) | Saenuri | Saenuri |
| Busan | Busanjin A | Na Seong-lin | Saenuri | Saenuri |
| Busan | Busanjin B | Lee Hun-seung | Saenuri | Saenuri |
| Busan | Dongnae | Lee Jin-bok | Saenuri | Saenuri |
| Busan | Nam A | Kim Jung-hoon | Saenuri | Saenuri |
| Busan | Nam B | Seo Yong-gyo | Saenuri | Saenuri |
| Busan | Buk–Gangseo A | Park Min-shik | Saenuri | Saenuri |
| Busan | Buk–Gangseo B | Kim Do-eup | Saenuri | Saenuri |
| Busan | Haeundae–Gijang A | Suh Byung-soo (Note: Suh Byung-soo resigned on 15 May 2014, to run in the 2014 Busan mayoral election.) | Saenuri | Saenuri |
| Busan | Haeundae–Gijang A | Bae Duk-kwang (Note: Bae Duk-kwang was by-elected on 30 July 2014, to succeed Suh Byung-soo.) | Saenuri | Saenuri |
| Busan | Haeundae–Gijang B | Ha Tae-keung | Saenuri | Saenuri |
| Busan | Saha A | Moon Dae-sung | Saenuri | Saenuri |
| Busan | Saha B | Cho Kyoung-tae | DUP | Saenuri |
| Busan | Geumjeong | Kim Se-yeon | Saenuri | Saenuri |
| Busan | Yeonje | Kim Hee-jung | Saenuri | Saenuri |
| Busan | Suyeong | Yoo Jae-jung | Saenuri | Saenuri |
| Busan | Sasang | Moon Jae-in | DUP | Democratic |
| Daegu | Jung–Nam | Kim Hee-kuk | Saenuri | Saenuri |
| Daegu | Dong A | Yoo Sung-kull | Saenuri | Independent |
| Daegu | Dong B | Yoo Seong-min | Saenuri | Independent |
| Daegu | Seo | Kim Sang-hoon | Saenuri | Saenuri |
| Daegu | Buk A | Kwon Eun-hee | Saenuri | Independent |
| Daegu | Buk B | Suh Sang-kee | Saenuri | Saenuri |
| Daegu | Suseong A | Lee Hahn-koo | Saenuri | Saenuri |
| Daegu | Suseong B | Joo Ho-young | Saenuri | Independent |
| Daegu | Dalseo A | Hong Ji-man | Saenuri | Saenuri |
| Daegu | Dalseo B | Yoon Jae-ok | Saenuri | Saenuri |
| Daegu | Dalseo C | Cho Won-jin | Saenuri | Saenuri |
| Daegu | Dalseong | Lee Jong-jin | Saenuri | Saenuri |
| Incheon | Jung–Dong–Ongjin | Park Sang-eun (Note: Park Sang-eun was removed on 24 December 2015.) | Saenuri | Saenuri |
| Incheon | Nam A | Hong Il-pyo | Saenuri | Saenuri |
| Incheon | Nam B | Yoon Sang-hyun | Saenuri | Independent |
| Incheon | Yeonsu | Hwang Woo-yea | Saenuri | Saenuri |
| Incheon | Namdong A | Park Nam-choon | DUP | Democratic |
| Incheon | Namdong B | Youn Kwan-suk | DUP | Democratic |
| Incheon | Bupyeong A | Moon Byeong-ho | DUP | People |
| Incheon | Bupyeong B | Hong Young-pyo | DUP | Democratic |
| Incheon | Gyeyang A | Shin Hak-yong | DUP | People |
| Incheon | Gyeyang B | Choi Won-sik | DUP | People |
| Incheon | Seo–Ganghwa A | Lee Hag-jae | Saenuri | Saenuri |
| Incheon | Seo–Ganghwa B | Ahn Deok-su (Note: Ahn Deok-su was removed on 12 March 2015, after his election was invalidated.) | Saenuri | Saenuri |
| Incheon | Seo–Ganghwa B | Ahn Sang-soo (Note: Ahn Sang-soo was by-elected on 29 April 2015, to succeed Ahn Deok-su.) | Saenuri | Independent |
| Gwangju | Dong | Park Joo-sun | Independent | People |
| Gwangju | Seo A | Park Hae-ja | DUP | Democratic |
| Gwangju | Seo B | Oh Byung-yoon (Note: Oh Byung-yoon was removed on 19 December 2014.) | UPP | UPP |
| Gwangju | Seo B | Chun Jung-bae (Note: Chun Jung-bae was by-elected on 29 April 2015, to succeed Oh Byung-yoon.) | Independent | People |
| Gwangju | Nam | Chang Byoung-wan | DUP | People |
| Gwangju | Buk A | Kang Gi-jung | DUP | Democratic |
| Gwangju | Buk B | Lim Nae-hyun | DUP | People |
| Gwangju | Gwangsan A | Kim Dong-cheol | DUP | People |
| Gwangju | Gwangsan B | Lee Yong-sup (Note: Lee Yong-sup resigned on 15 May 2014, to run in the 2014 Gwangju mayoral election.) | DUP | Independent |
| Gwangju | Gwangsan B | Kwon Eun-hee (Note: Kwon Eun-hee was by-elected on 30 July 2014, to succeed Lee Yong-sup.) | NPAD | People |
| Daejeon | Dong | Lee Jang-woo | Saenuri | Saenuri |
| Daejeon | Jung | Kang Chang-hee | Saenuri | Saenuri |
| Daejeon | Seo A | Park Byeong-seug | DUP | Democratic |
| Daejeon | Seo B | Park Beom-kye | DUP | Democratic |
| Daejeon | Yuseong | Lee Sang-min | DUP | Democratic |
| Daejeon | Daedeok | Park Seoung-hyo (Note: Park Seoung-hyo resigned on 15 May 2014, to run in the 2014 Daeju mayoral election.) | Saenuri | Saenuri |
| Daejeon | Daedeok | Jeong Yong-ki (Note: Jeong Yong-ki was by-elected on 30 July 2014, to succeed Park Seoung-hyo.) | Saenuri | Saenuri |
| Ulsan | Jung | Jeong Kab-yoon | Saenuri | Saenuri |
| Ulsan | Nam A | Lee Chae-ik | Saenuri | Saenuri |
| Ulsan | Nam B | Kim Gi-hyeon (Note: Kim Gi-hyeon resigned on 15 May 2014, to run in the 2014 Ulsan mayoral election.) | Saenuri | Saenuri |
| Ulsan | Nam B | Bak Maeng-woo (Note: Bak Maeng-woo was by-elected on 30 July 2014, to succeed Kim Gi-hyeon.) | Saenuri | Saenuri |
| Ulsan | Dong | Ahn Hyo-dae | Saenuri | Saenuri |
| Ulsan | Buk | Park Dae-dong | Saenuri | Saenuri |
| Ulsan | Ulju | Kang Ghil-boo | Saenuri | Independent |
| Sejong | Sejong | Lee Hae-chan | DUP | Independent |
| Gyeonggi Province | Suwon A | Lee Chan-yeol | DUP | Democratic |
| Gyeonggi Province | Suwon B | Shin Jang-yong (Note: Shin Jang-yong was removed on 16 January 2014.) | DUP | DP |
| Gyeonggi Province | Suwon B | Chung Mi-kyung (Note: Chung Mi-kyung was by-elected on 30 July 2014, to succeed Shin Jang-yong.) | Saenuri | Saenuri |
| Gyeonggi Province | Suwon C | Nam Kyung-pil (Note: Nam Kyung-pil resigned on 15 May 2014, to run in the 2014 Gyeonggi gubernatorial election.) | Saenuri | Saenuri |
| Gyeonggi Province | Suwon C | Kim Yong-nam (Note: Kim Yong-nam was by-elected on 30 July 2014, to succeed Nam Kyung-pil.) | Saenuri | Saenuri |
| Gyeonggi Province | Suwon D | Kim Jin-pyo (Note: Kim Jin-pyo resigned on 15 May 2014, to run in the 2014 Gyeonggi gubernatorial election.) | DUP | NPAD |
| Gyeonggi Province | Suwon D | Park Kwang-on (Note: Park Kwang-on was by-elected on 30 July 2014, to succeed Kim Jin-pyo.) | NPAD | Democratic |
| Gyeonggi Province | Sujeong, Seongnam | Kim Tae-nyeon | DUP | Democratic |
| Gyeonggi Province | Jungwon, Seongnam | Kim Mi-hyul (Note: Kim Mi-hyul was removed on 19 December 2014.) | UPP | UPP |
| Gyeonggi Province | Jungwon, Seongnam | Shin Sang-jin (Note: Shin Sang-jin was by-elected on 29 April 2015, to succeed Kim Mi-hyul.) | Saenuri | Saenuri |
| Gyeonggi Province | Bundang A, Seongnam | Rhee Chong-hoon | Saenuri | Saenuri |
| Gyeonggi Province | Bundang B, Seongnam | Jhun Ha-jin | Saenuri | Saenuri |
| Gyeonggi Province | Uijeongbu A | Moon Hee-sang | DUP | Democratic |
| Gyeonggi Province | Uijeongbu B | Hong Moon-jong | Saenuri | Saenuri |
| Gyeonggi Province | Manan, Anyang | Lee Jong-kul | DUP | Democratic |
| Gyeonggi Province | Dongan A, Anyang | Lee Seok-hyun | DUP | Democratic |
| Gyeonggi Province | Dongan B, Anyang | Shim Jae-chul | Saenuri | Saenuri |
| Gyeonggi Province | Wonmi A, Bucheon | Kim Kyung-hyub | DUP | Democratic |
| Gyeonggi Province | Wonmi B, Bucheon | Sul Hoon | DUP | Democratic |
| Gyeonggi Province | Sosa, Bucheon | Kim Sang-hee | DUP | Democratic |
| Gyeonggi Province | Ojeong, Bucheon | Won Hye-young | DUP | Democratic |
| Gyeonggi Province | Gwangmyeong A | Baek Jae-hyun | DUP | Democratic |
| Gyeonggi Province | Gwangmyeong B | Lee Un-ju | DUP | Democratic |
| Gyeonggi Province | Pyeongtaek A | Won Yoo-chul | Saenuri | Saenuri |
| Gyeonggi Province | Pyeongtaek B | Lee Jae-young (Note: Lee Jae-young was removed on 16 January 2014.) | Saenuri | Saenuri |
| Gyeonggi Province | Pyeongtaek B | Yu Eui-dong (Note: Yu Eui-dong was by-elected on 30 July 2014, to succeed Lee Jae-young.) | Saenuri | Saenuri |
| Gyeonggi Province | Yangju–Dongducheon | Jung Sung-ho | DUP | Democratic |
| Gyeonggi Province | Sangnok A, Ansan | Jeon Hae-cheol | DUP | Democratic |
| Gyeonggi Province | Sangnok B, Ansan | Kim Young-hwan | DUP | People |
| Gyeonggi Province | Danwon A, Ansan | Kim Myung-yeon | Saenuri | Saenuri |
| Gyeonggi Province | Danwon B, Ansan | Boo Jwa-hyun | DUP | People |
| Gyeonggi Province | Deogyang A, Goyang | Sim Sang-jung | UPP | Justice |
| Gyeonggi Province | Deogyang B, Goyang | Kim Tae-won | Saenuri | Saenuri |
| Gyeonggi Province | Ilsandong, Goyang | Yoo Eun-hae | DUP | Democratic |
| Gyeonggi Province | Ilsanseo, Goyang | Kim Hyun-mee | DUP | Democratic |
| Gyeonggi Province | Uiwang–Gwacheon | Song Ho-chang | DUP | Democratic |
| Gyeonggi Province | Guri | Yun Ho-jung | DUP | Democratic |
| Gyeonggi Province | Namyangju A | Choi Jae-sung | DUP | Democratic |
| Gyeonggi Province | Namyangju B | Park Ki-choon | DUP | Independent |
| Gyeonggi Province | Osan | An Min-suk | DUP | Democratic |
| Gyeonggi Province | Hwaseong A | Ko Hee-sun (Note: Ko Hee-sun died on 25 August 2013.) | Saenuri | Saenuri |
| Gyeonggi Province | Hwaseong A | Suh Chung-won (Note: Suh Chung-won was by-elected on 30 October 2013, to succeed Ko Hee-sun.) | Saenuri | Saenuri |
| Gyeonggi Province | Hwaseong B | Lee Won-wook | DUP | Democratic |
| Gyeonggi Province | Siheung A | Ham Jin-gyu | Saenuri | Saenuri |
| Gyeonggi Province | Siheung B | Cho Jeong-sik | DUP | Democratic |
| Gyeonggi Province | Gunpo | Lee Hack-young | DUP | Democratic |
| Gyeonggi Province | Hanam | Lee Hyun-jae | Saenuri | Saenuri |
| Gyeonggi Province | Paju A | Yoon Hu-duk | DUP | Democratic |
| Gyeonggi Province | Paju B | Hwang Jin-ha | Saenuri | Saenuri |
| Gyeonggi Province | Yongin A | Lee Woo-hyun | Saenuri | Saenuri |
| Gyeonggi Province | Yongin B | Jung Sung-ho | DUP | Democratic |
| Gyeonggi Province | Yongin C | Han Sun-kyo | Saenuri | Saenuri |
| Gyeonggi Province | Anseong | Kim Hack-yong | Saenuri | Saenuri |
| Gyeonggi Province | Gimpo | Yoo Jeong-bok (Note: Yoo Jeong-bok resigned on 15 May 2014, to run in the 2014 Incheon mayoral election.) | Saenuri | Saenuri |
| Gyeonggi Province | Gimpo | Hong Chul-ho (Note: Hong Chul-ho was by-elected on 30 July 2014, to succeed Yoo Jeong-bok.) | Saenuri | Saenuri |
| Gyeonggi Province | Gwangju | Roh Chul-rae | Saenuri | Saenuri |
| Gyeonggi Province | Pocheon–Yeoncheon | Kim Young-woo | Saenuri | Saenuri |
| Gyeonggi Province | Icheon | Yoo Seung-woo | Saenuri | Independent |
| Gyeonggi Province | Yeoju–Yangpyeong–Gapyeong | Choung Byoung-gug | Saenuri | Saenuri |
| Gangwon Province | Chuncheon | Kim Jin-tae | Saenuri | Saenuri |
| Gangwon Province | Wonju A | Kim Ki-sun | Saenuri | Saenuri |
| Gangwon Province | Wonju B | Lee Kang-hoo | Saenuri | Saenuri |
| Gangwon Province | Gangneung | Kweon Seong-dong | Saenuri | Saenuri |
| Gangwon Province | Donghae–Samcheok | Lee Lee-jae | Saenuri | Saenuri |
| Gangwon Province | Sokcho–Goseong–Yangyang | Chung Moon-hun | Saenuri | Saenuri |
| Gangwon Province | Hongcheon–Hoengseong | Hwang Young-cheul | Saenuri | Saenuri |
| Gangwon Province | Taebaek–Yeongwol–Pyeongchang–Jeongseon | Yeom Dong-yeol | Saenuri | Saenuri |
| Gangwon Province | Cheorwon–Hwacheon–Yanggu–Inje | Han Ki-ho | Saenuri | Saenuri |
| North Chungcheong Province | Sangdang, Cheongju | Chung Woo-taik | Saenuri | Saenuri |
| North Chungcheong Province | Heungdeok A, Cheongju | Oh Jae-sae | DUP | Democratic |
| North Chungcheong Province | Heungdeok B, Cheongju | Noh Young-min | DUP | Democratic |
| North Chungcheong Province | Chungju | Yoon Jin-sik (Note: Yoon Jin-sik resigned on 15 May 2014, to run in the 2014 North Chungcheong gubernatorial election.) | Saenuri | Saenuri |
| North Chungcheong Province | Chungju | Lee Jong-bae (Note: Lee Jong-bae was by-elected on 30 July 2014, to succeed Yoon Jin-sik.) | Saenuri | Saenuri |
| North Chungcheong Province | Jecheon–Danyang | Song Kwang-ho (Note: Song Kwang-ho was removed on 12 November 2015.) | Saenuri | Saenuri |
| North Chungcheong Province | Cheongwon | Byun Jae-ill | DUP | Democratic |
| North Chungcheong Province | Boeun–Okcheon–Yeongdong | Park Duk-hyum | Saenuri | Saenuri |
| North Chungcheong Province | Jeungpyeong–Jincheon–Gwisan–Eumseong | Kyung Dae-soo | Saenuri | Saenuri |
| South Chungcheong Province | Cheonan A | Yang Seoung-jo | DUP | Democratic |
| South Chungcheong Province | Cheonan B | Park Wan-ju | DUP | Democratic |
| South Chungcheong Province | Gongju | Park Soo-hyun | DUP | Democratic |
| South Chungcheong Province | Boryeong–Seocheon | Kim Tae-heum | Saenuri | Saenuri |
| South Chungcheong Province | Asan | Lee Myoung-su | LFP | Saenuri |
| South Chungcheong Province | Seosan–Taean | Sung Woan-jong (Note: Sung Woan-jong was removed on 26 June 2014.) | LFP | Saenuri |
| South Chungcheong Province | Seosan–Taean | Kim Je-sik (Note: Kim Je-sik was by-elected on 30 July 2014, to succeed Sung Woan-jong.) | Saenuri | Saenuri |
| South Chungcheong Province | Nonsan–Gyeryong–Geumsan | Lee In-je | LFP | Saenuri |
| South Chungcheong Province | Buyeo–Cheongyang | Kim Geun-tae (Note: Kim Geun-tae was removed on 28 February 2013.) | Saenuri | Saenuri |
| South Chungcheong Province | Buyeo–Cheongyang | Lee Wan-koo (Note: Lee Wan-koo was by-elected on 24 April 2013, to succeed Kim Geun-tae.) | Saenuri | Saenuri |
| South Chungcheong Province | Hongseong–Yesan | Hong Moon-pyo | Saenuri | Saenuri |
| South Chungcheong Province | Dangjin | Kim Dong-wan | Saenuri | Saenuri |
| North Jeolla Province | Wansan A, Jeonju | Kim Yun-duk | DUP | Democratic |
| North Jeolla Province | Wansan B, Jeonju | Lee Sanng-jik | DUP | Democratic |
| North Jeolla Province | Deokjin, Jeonju | Kim Sung-ju | DUP | Democratic |
| North Jeolla Province | Gunsan | Kim Kwan-young | DUP | People |
| North Jeolla Province | Iksan A | Lee Choon-suak | DUP | Democratic |
| North Jeolla Province | Iksan B | Jeon Jeong-hee | DUP | People |
| North Jeolla Province | Jeongeup | Yu Sung-yup | Independent | People |
| North Jeolla Province | Namwon–Sunchang | Kang Dong-won | UPP | Independent |
| North Jeolla Province | Gimje–Wanju | Choi Gyu-sung | DUP | Democratic |
| North Jeolla Province | Jinan–Muju–Jangsu–Imsil | Park Min-soo | DUP | Democratic |
| North Jeolla Province | Gochang–Buan | Kim Choon-jin | DUP | Democratic |
| South Jeolla Province | Mokpo | Park Jie-won | DUP | People |
| South Jeolla Province | Yeosu A | Kim Sung-gon | DUP | Democratic |
| South Jeolla Province | Yeosu B | Joo Seung-yong | DUP | People |
| South Jeolla Province | Suncheon–Gokseong | Kim Sun-dong (Note: Kim Sun-dong was removed on 12 June 2014.) | UPP | UPP |
| South Jeolla Province | Suncheon–Gokseong | Lee Jung-hyun (Note: Lee Jung-hyun was by-elected on 30 July 2014, to succeed Kim Sun-dong.) | Saenuri | Saenuri |
| South Jeolla Province | Naju–Hwasun | Bae Ki-woon (Note: Bae Ki-woon was removed on 12 June 2014.) | DUP | NPAD |
| South Jeolla Province | Naju–Hwasun | Shin Jeung-hoon (Note: Shin Jeung-hoon was by-elected on 30 July 2014, to succeed Bae Ki-woon.) | NPAD | Democratic |
| South Jeolla Province | Gwangyang–Gurye | Woo Yoon-keun | DUP | Democratic |
| South Jeolla Province | Damyang–Hwapyeong–Yeonggwang–Jangseong | Lee Nak-yon (Note: Lee Nak-yon resigned on 12 March 2014, to run in the 2014 South Jeolla gubernatorial election.) | DUP | DP |
| South Jeolla Province | Damyang–Hwapyeong–Yeonggwang–Jangseong | Lee Kai-ho (Note: Lee Kai-ho was by-elected on 30 July 2014, to succeed Lee Nak-yon.) | NPAD | Democratic |
| South Jeolla Province | Goheung–Boseong | Kim Seung-nam | DUP | Democratic |
| South Jeolla Province | Jangheung–Gangjin–Yeongam | Hwang Ju-hong | DUP | People |
| South Jeolla Province | Haenam–Wando–Jindo | Kim Yung-rok | DUP | Democratic |
| South Jeolla Province | Muan–Sinan | Lee Yoon-seok | DUP | Independent |
| North Gyeongsang Province | Buk, Pohang | Lee Byung-suk | Saenuri | Saenuri |
| North Gyeongsang Province | Nam, Pohang–Ulleung | Kim Hyung-tae (Note: Kim Hyung-tae was removed on 25 July 2013.) | Saenuri | Independent |
| North Gyeongsang Province | Nam, Pohang–Ulleung | Park Myung-jae (Note: Park Myung-jae was by-elected on 30 October 2013.) | Saenuri | Saenuri |
| North Gyeongsang Province | Gyeongju | Jung Soo-sung | Saenuri | Saenuri |
| North Gyeongsang Province | Gimcheon | Lee Cheol-woo | Saenuri | Saenuri |
| North Gyeongsang Province | Andong | Kim Gwang-lim | Saenuri | Saenuri |
| North Gyeongsang Province | Gumi A | Sim Hag-bong (Note: Sim Hag-bong resigned on 12 October 2015.) | Saenuri | Independent |
| North Gyeongsang Province | Gumi B | Kim Tae-whan | Saenuri | Independent |
| North Gyeongsang Province | Yeongju | Chang Yoon-seok | Saenuri | Saenuri |
| North Gyeongsang Province | Yeongcheon | Chung Hee-soo | Saenuri | Saenuri |
| North Gyeongsang Province | Sangju | Kim Jong-tae | Saenuri | Saenuri |
| North Gyeongsang Province | Mungyeong–Yecheon | Lee Han-sung | Saenuri | Saenuri |
| North Gyeongsang Province | Gyeongsan–Cheongdo | Choi Kyoung-hwan | Saenuri | Saenuri |
| North Gyeongsang Province | Goryeong–Seongju–Chilgok | Yi Wan-young | Saenuri | Saenuri |
| North Gyeongsang Province | Gunwi–Uiseong–Cheongsong | Kim Jae-won | Saenuri | Saenuri |
| North Gyeongsang Province | Yeongyang–Yeongdeok–Bonghwa–Uljin | Kang Seok-ho | Saenuri | Saenuri |
| South Gyeongsang Province | Uichang, Changwon | Park Seong-ho | Saenuri | Saenuri |
| South Gyeongsang Province | Seongsan, Changwon | Kang Gi-yun | Saenuri | Saenuri |
| South Gyeongsang Province | Masanhappo, Changwon | Lee Ju-young | Saenuri | Saenuri |
| South Gyeongsang Province | Masanhoewon, Changwon | Ahn Hong-joon | Saenuri | Saenuri |
| South Gyeongsang Province | Jinhae, Changwon | Kim Sung-chan | Saenuri | Saenuri |
| South Gyeongsang Province | Jinju A | Park Dae-chul | Saenuri | Saenuri |
| South Gyeongsang Province | Jinju B | Kim Jae-kyung | Saenuri | Saenuri |
| South Gyeongsang Province | Tongyeong–Goseong | Lee Koon-hyon | Saenuri | Saenuri |
| South Gyeongsang Province | Sacheon–Namhae–Hadong | Yeo Sang-kyoo | Saenuri | Saenuri |
| South Gyeongsang Province | Gimhae A | Min Hong-chul | DUP | Democratic |
| South Gyeongsang Province | Gimhae B | Kim Tae-ho | Saenuri | Saenuri |
| South Gyeongsang Province | Miryang–Changnyeong | Cho Hae-jin | Saenuri | Independent |
| South Gyeongsang Province | Geoje | Kim Han-pyo | Independent | Saenuri |
| South Gyeongsang Province | Yangsan | Yoon Young-seok | Saenuri | Saenuri |
| South Gyeongsang Province | Uiryeong–Haman–Hapcheon | Cho Hyun-yong (Note: Cho Hyun-yong was removed on 27 November 2015.) | Saenuri | Saenuri |
| South Gyeongsang Province | Sancheong–Hamyang–Geochang | Shin Sung-bum | Saenuri | Saenuri |
| Jeju Province | Jeju City A | Kang Chang-il | DUP | Democratic |
| Jeju Province | Jeju City B | Kim Woo-nam | DUP | Democratic |
| Jeju Province | Seogwipo | Kim Jae-yun (Note: Kim Jae-yeon was removed on 12 November 2015.) | DUP | NPAD |
| National | Proportional representation | Min Byung-joo | Saenuri | Saenuri |
| National | Proportional representation | Kim Jung-rok | Saenuri | Saenuri |
| National | Proportional representation | Yoon Myung-hee | Saenuri | Saenuri |
| National | Proportional representation | Cho Myung-chul | Saenuri | Saenuri |
| National | Proportional representation | Kang Eun-hee (Note: Kang Eun-hee resigned on 19 June 2016, upon being appointed as Minister of Gender Equality and Family.) | Saenuri | Saenuri |
| National | Proportional representation | Joo Young-soon | Saenuri | Saenuri |
| National | Proportional representation | Shin Yee-jin | Saenuri | Saenuri |
| National | Proportional representation | Lee Sang-il | Saenuri | Saenuri |
| National | Proportional representation | Lee Elisa | Saenuri | Saenuri |
| National | Proportional representation | Lee Man-woo | Saenuri | Saenuri |
| National | Proportional representation | Park Geun-hye (Note: Park Geun-hye resigned on 10 December 2012, to run in the 2012 South Korean presidential election.) | Saenuri | Saenuri |
| National | Proportional representation | An Chong-bum (Note: An Chong-bum resigned on 16 June 2014, upon being appointed as Senior Presidential Secretary for Economic Affairs.) | Saenuri | Saenuri |
| National | Proportional representation | Kim Hyun-sook (Note: Kim Hyun-sook resigned on 4 August 2015, upon being appointed as Senior Presidential Secretary for Employment and Wealth.) | Saenuri | Saenuri |
| National | Proportional representation | Kim Jang-shil | Saenuri | Saenuri |
| National | Proportional representation | Jasmine Bacurnay Lee | Saenuri | Saenuri |
| National | Proportional representation | Choi Bong-hong | Saenuri | Saenuri |
| National | Proportional representation | You Jee-young | Saenuri | Saenuri |
| National | Proportional representation | Song Young-keun | Saenuri | Saenuri |
| National | Proportional representation | Min Hyun-joo | Saenuri | Saenuri |
| National | Proportional representation | Park Chang-sik | Saenuri | Saenuri |
| National | Proportional representation | Shon In-chun | Saenuri | Saenuri |
| National | Proportional representation | Kim Sang-min | Saenuri | Saenuri |
| National | Proportional representation | Hyun Young-hee (Note: Hyun Young-hee was removed on 16 January 2014, after her election was invalidated.) | Saenuri | Independent |
| National | Proportional representation | Lee Jae-young | Saenuri | Saenuri |
| National | Proportional representation | Shin Kyung-rim | Saenuri | Saenuri |
| National | Proportional representation | Lee Un-ryong (Note: Lee Un-ryong took office on 10 December 2012, to succeed Park Geun-hye.) | Saenuri | Saenuri |
| National | Proportional representation | Park Yoon-ok (Note: Park Yoon-ok took office on 16 January 2014, to succeed Hyun Young-hee.) | Saenuri | Saenuri |
| National | Proportional representation | Jang Jung-eun (Note: Jang Jung-eun took office on 4 August 2015, to succeed Kim Hyun-sook.) | Saenuri | Saenuri |
| National | Proportional representation | Chun Soon-ok | DUP | Democratic |
| National | Proportional representation | Choi Dong-ic | DUP | Democratic |
| National | Proportional representation | Eun Soo-mi | DUP | Democratic |
| National | Proportional representation | Hong Jong-haak | DUP | Democratic |
| National | Proportional representation | Jin Sun-mee | DUP | Democratic |
| National | Proportional representation | Kim Yong-ik | DUP | Democratic |
| National | Proportional representation | Bae Jae-jeung | DUP | Democratic |
| National | Proportional representation | Baek Kun-ki | DUP | Democratic |
| National | Proportional representation | Nam In-soon | DUP | Democratic |
| National | Proportional representation | Kim Kwang-jin | DUP | Democratic |
| National | Proportional representation | Han Jeoung-ae | DUP | Democratic |
| National | Proportional representation | Kim Gi-juhn | DUP | Democratic |
| National | Proportional representation | Chang Ha-na | DUP | Democratic |
| National | Proportional representation | Kim Ki-sik | DUP | Democratic |
| National | Proportional representation | Han Myeong-sook (Note: Han Myeong-sook was removed on 20 August 2015.) | DUP | NPAD |
| National | Proportional representation | Do Jong-hwan | DUP | Democratic |
| National | Proportional representation | Kim Hyun | DUP | Democratic |
| National | Proportional representation | Jin Sung-joon | DUP | Democratic |
| National | Proportional representation | Choi Min-hee | DUP | Democratic |
| National | Proportional representation | Hong Eui-rak (Note: Hong Eui-rak was removed on 18 May 2016.) | DUP | Democratic |
| National | Proportional representation | Lim Su-kyung | DUP | Democratic |
| National | Proportional representation | Shin Moon-sik (Note: Shin Moon-sik took office on 20 August 2015, to succeed Han Myeong-sook.) | NPAD (Note: Included in the Democratic United Party list in the 2012 election.) | Democratic |
| National | Proportional representation | Yoon Geum-soon (Note: Yoon Geum-soon resigned on 9 July 2012.) | UPP | UPP |
| National | Proportional representation | Lee Seok-ki (Note: Lee Seok-ki was removed on 19 December 2014.) | UPP | UPP |
| National | Proportional representation | Kim Jae-yeon (Note: Kim Jae-yeon was removed on 19 December 2014.) | UPP | UPP |
| National | Proportional representation | Chung Jin-hu | UPP | Justice |
| National | Proportional representation | Kim Je-nam | UPP | Justice |
| National | Proportional representation | Park Won-suk | UPP | Justice |
| National | Proportional representation | Seo Gi-ho (Note: Seo Gi-ho took office on 9 July 2012, to succeed Yoon Geum-soon.) | UPP | Justice |
| National | Proportional representation | Moon Jung-rim | LFP | Saenuri |
| National | Proportional representation | Kim Young-ju (Note: Kim Young-ju was removed on 12 December 2013.) | LFP | Saenuri |
| National | Proportional representation | Hwang In-ja (Note: Hwang In-ja took office on 16 December 2013, to succeed Kim Young-ju.) | Saenuri (Note: Included in the Liberty Forward Party list in the 2012 election.) | Saenuri |

== Notes ==
| Preceded by 2008–2012 | Members of the National Assembly | Succeeded by 2016–2020 |
