= Park Nam-choon =

South Korean politician (born 1958)

- 박남춘
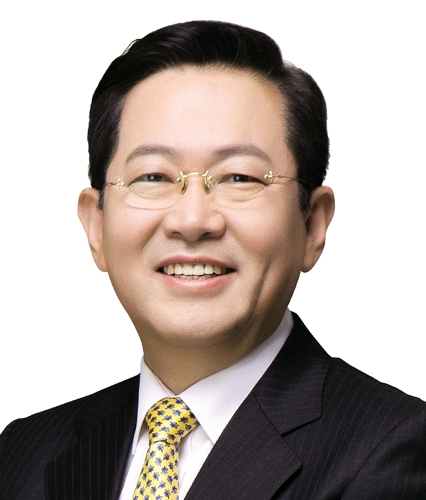

Mayor of Incheon
- In office 1 July 2018 – 30 June 2022
- Preceded by: Yoo Jeong-bok
- Succeeded by: Yoo Jeong-bok

Member of the National Assembly
- In office 30 May 2012 – 14 May 2018
- Preceded by: Lee Yun-sung
- Succeeded by: Maeng Sung Kyu
- Constituency: Namdong A (Incheon)

Senior Presidential Secretary for Personnel Management
- In office 3 May 2006 – 21 December 2007
- President: Roh Moo-hyun
- Prime Minister: Han Myeong-sook; Kwon O-kyu (acting); Han Duck-soo
- Preceded by: Kim Wan-ki
- Succeeded by: Jeong Yeong-ae

Chairman of the Incheon International Airport Corporation
- Incumbent
- Assumed office 19 November 2026
- President: Lee Jae Myung
- Prime Minister: Han Seong-sook
- Preceded by: Lee Hak-jae; Kim Beom-ho (acting)

Personal details
- Born: 2 July 1958 (age 68) Jemulpo, Incheon, South Korea
- Party: Democratic
- Education: Korea University; University of Wales
- Religion: Roman Catholic (Christian name : Andrew)
- Website: Park Nam-chun's Blog

Korean name
- Hangul: 박남춘
- Hanja: 朴南春
- RR: Bak Namchun
- MR: Pak Namch'un

Park Nam-choon (Korean: 박남춘; born 2 July 1958) is a South Korean public servant and politician who served as the Mayor of Incheon from 1 July 2018 to 30 June 2022.

== Mayor of Incheon (2018–2022) ==
Park visited the production facility of Samsung Biologics to seek city support to turn Songdo International City into a world-class biocluster.

"My ultimate goal is not only nurturing our own manpower, but also from elsewhere in Asia, as interest in biotechnology is high on the continent. Since we are equipped with an Incheon International Airport with good infrastructure, the city can play a role in training those who wish to be taught."

— Mayor Park from an interview with Korea JoongAng Daily,

== Election results ==
=== General elections ===
Year	Elections	Constituency	Political party	Votes (%)	Results
2012	19th National Assembly General Election	Namdong A (Incheon)	DUP	56,283 (46.97%)	Won
2016	20th National Assembly General Election	Namdong A (Incheon)	Democratic	56,857 (50.58%)	Won

=== Local Elections ===
==== Mayor of Incheon ====
Year	Elections	Constituency	Political party	Votes (%)	Results
2018	7th Iocal Election	Incheon (Mayoral Elections)	Democratic	766,186 (57.66%)	Won
2022	8th Iocal Election	Incheon (Mayoral Elections)	Democratic	545,885 (44.55%)	Defeated (2nd)

National Assembly of the Republic of Korea
Preceded by Lee Yun-sung	Member of the National Assembly for Namdong A (Incheon); 30 May 2012–14 May 2018	Succeeded by Maeng Sung-kyu
Political offices
Preceded by Yoo Jeong-bok	Mayor of Incheon; 1 July 2018–30 June 2022	Succeeded by Yoo Jeong-bok
Preceded by Lee Hak-jae; Kim Beom-ho (Acting)	Chairman of the Incheon International Airport Corporation; 19 November 2026–	Incumbent
Preceded by Kim Wan-ki	Senior Presidential Secretary for Personnel Management; 3 May 2006–21 December 2007	Succeeded by Jeong Yeong-ae
