= Deok-su =

- Hangul: 덕수
- RR: Deoksu
- MR: Tŏksu
- IPA: [tʌk̚s͈u]

Deok-su, also spelled Deok-soo, Duk-soo, or Duck-soo, is a Korean given name.

People with this name include:

- Chang Deok-soo (1894–1947), Korean journalist and independence activist
- Han Duk-su (1907–2001), North Korean activist
- Moon Deoksu (born 1928), South Korean poet
- Ahn Deok-su (born 1946), South Korean politician
- Han Duck-soo (born 1949), South Korean politician
- Kang Duk-soo (born 1950), South Korean businessman
- Kim Deok-soo (born 1987), South Korean football player
- Kim Duk-soo (born 1952), South Korean musician

== See also ==
- List of Korean given names
