= Ahn Sang-soo (Incheon mayor) =

South Korean politician (born May 1946)

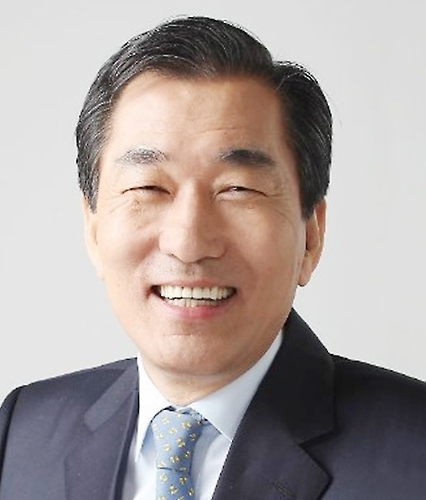

Member of the National Assembly
- In office 4 June 1999 – 29 May 2000
- Preceded by: Lee Ki-mun
- Succeeded by: Song Young-gil (Gyeyang, Incheon)
- Constituency: Gyeyang–Ganghwa A (Incheon)
- In office 30 April 2015 – 29 May 2016
- Preceded by: Ahn Deok-su
- Succeeded by: Himself (Jung–Dong–Ganghwa–Ongjin, Incheon); Lee Hak-jae (Seo A, Incheon); Shin Dong-kun (Seo B, Incheon)
- Constituency: Seo–Ganghwa B (Incheon)
- In office 30 May 2016 – 29 May 2020
- Preceded by: Park Sang-eun (Jung–Dong–Ongjin, Incheon); Himself (Seo-Ganghwa B, Incheon)
- Succeeded by: Bae june-young (Jung–Ganghwa–Ongjin, Incheon); Heo Jong-sik (Dong–Michuhol A, Incheon)
- Constituency: Jung–Dong–Ganghwa–Ongjin (Incheon)

Mayor of Incheon
- In office 1 July 2002 – 30 June 2010
- Preceded by: Choi Ki-sun
- Succeeded by: Song Young-gil

Personal details
- Born: 28 May 1946 (age 80) Seosan, South Chungcheong, USAMGIK
- Party: Independent
- Spouse: Jeong Gyeong-im
- Education: Seoul National University
- Religion: Christian (Methodist)

Korean name
- Hangul: 안상수
- Hanja: 安相洙
- RR: An Sangsu
- MR: An Sangsu

Ahn Sang-soo (Korean: 안상수; born 28 May 1946) is a South Korean politician of the People Power Party who served as two-time mayor of Incheon from 2002 to 2010. In the 2010 local elections he lost his position to Song Young-gil of the Democratic Party. He was a candidate for the Saenuri nomination in the 2012 presidential elections. As mayor, Ahn was responsible for initiating a range of expensive construction projects which have been implicated in causing financial difficulties.

On November 22, 2019, while serving in the National Assembly representing the opposition Liberty Korea party, he introduced an amendment to remove homophobia and transphobia from a list of violations of an anti-discrimination law. He used a poster that compared homosexual marriage to a picture of a woman marrying a dog.

== Election results ==
=== General elections ===
Year	Elections	Constituency	Political party	Votes (%)	Results
1996	15th National Assembly General Election	Gyeyang–Ganghwa A (Incheon)	NKP	24,697 (27.93%)	Defeated (2nd)
1999	June 1999 By-election	Gyeyang–Ganghwa A (Incheon)	GNP	36,784 (54.89%)	Won
2000	16th National Assembly General Election	Gyeyang (Incheon)	GNP	48,953 (44.41%)	Defeated (2nd)
2015	2015 By-election	Seo–Ganghwa B (Incheon)	Saenuri	33,256 (54.11%)	Won
2016	20th National Assembly General Election	Jung–Dong–Ganghwa–Ongjin (Incheon)	Independent	41,504 (31.87%)	Won
2020	21st National Assembly General Election	Dong–Michuhol B (Incheon)	UFP	17,843 (15.57%)	Defeated (3rd)

=== Local elections ===
==== Mayor of Incheon ====
Year	Elections	Constituency	Political party	Votes (%)	Remarks
1998	2nd Iocal Election	Incheon (Mayoral Elections)	GNP	238,708 (34.26%)	Defeated (2nd)
2002	3rd Iocal Election	Incheon (Mayoral Elections)	GNP	393,932 (56.17%)	Won
2006	4th Iocal Election	Incheon (Mayoral Elections)	GNP	526,932 (61.93%)	Won
2010	5th Iocal Election	Incheon (Mayoral Elections)	GNP	469,040 (44.38%)	Defeated (2nd)

==== Mayor of Incheon Ganghwa ====
Year	Elections	Constituency	Political party	Votes (%)	Remarks
2024	2024 By-election	Mayor of Incheon Ganghwa	Independent	2,280 (6.25%)	Defeated (3rd)

National Assembly of the Republic of Korea
Preceded by Lee Ki-mun	Member of the National Assembly for Gyeyang–Ganghwa A (Incheon); 4 June 1999–29 May 2000	Succeeded by Song Young-gil (Gyeyang, Incheon)
Preceded by Ahn Deok-su	Member of the National Assembly for Seo–Ganghwa B (Incheon); 30 April 2015–29 May 2016	Succeeded by Himself (Jung–Dong–Ganghwa–Ongjin, Incheon); Lee Hak-jae (Seo A, Incheon); Shin Dong-kun (Seo B, Incheon)
Preceded by Park Sang-eun (Jung–Dong–Ongjin, Incheon); Himself (Seo–Ganghwa B, Incheon)	Member of the National Assembly for Jung–Dong–Ganghwa–Ongjin (Incheon); 30 May 2016–29 May 2020	Succeeded by Bae June-young (Jung–Ganghwa–Ongjin, Incheon); Heo Jong-sik (Dong–Michuhol A, Incheon)
Political offices
Preceded by Choi Ki-sun	Mayor of Incheon; 1 July 2002–30 June 2010	Succeeded by Song Young-gil
