= Bupyeong High School =

Public boys' school in Incheon, South Korea

Bupyeong High School (BHS)
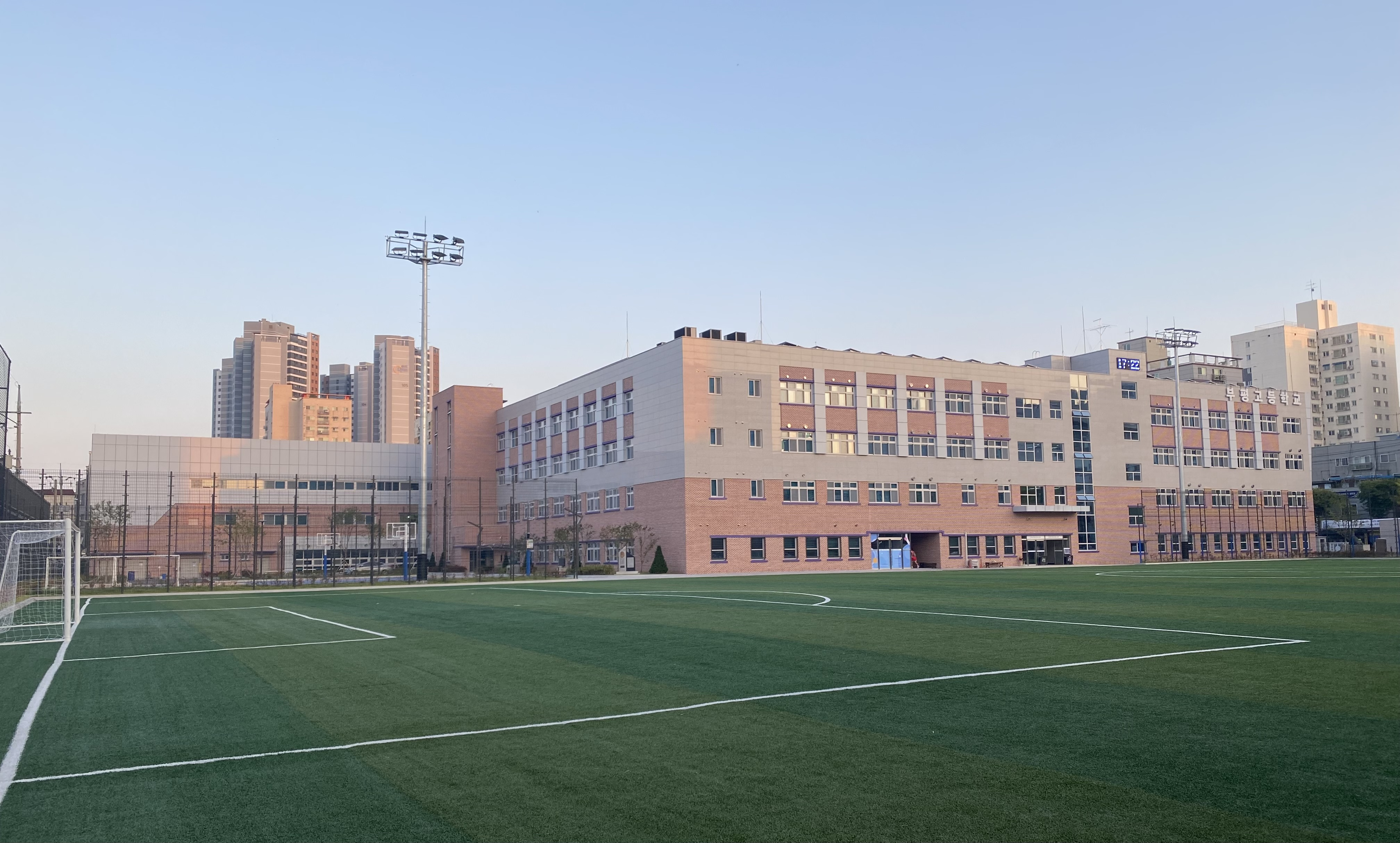

Location
- 43, Buheungbuk-ro; Bupyeong-gu, Incheon; South Korea; 37.50224°N 126.72757°E

Information
- Type: Public School for boys (Charter School)
- Motto: Sincerity (Korean: 성실; Hanja: 誠實)
- Established: 1971
- School district: Incheon Metropolitan City Office of Education
- Principal: Kim Jeong-soo
- Faculty: 88 (2021)
- Grades: 10-12
- Enrollment: 679 (2021)
- Colors: Green (Lion); Rose (Flower); Gold (Ginkgo)
- Mascot: Green Lion (Korean: 녹사자; Hanja: 綠獅子)
- Website: bupyeong.icehs.kr/main.do

- Bupyeong High School
- Hangul: 부평고등학교
- Hanja: 富平高等學校
- RR: Bupyeong godeunghakgyo
- MR: Pup'yŏng kodŭnghakkyo

Bupyeong High School (BHS, Korean: 부평고등학교; Hanja: 富平高等學校) is a public secondary school (grades 10-12 high school) for boys in South Korea, which is located in Bupyeong-dong, Bupyeong-gu, Incheon, South Korea. The BHS was opened on March 6, 1972. The School Mascot is a “Green Lion”.

Established in 1971 to educate selected boys from Gyeonggi Province including Incheon, the BHS later became one of the public schools for boys in Incheon was granted Directly Governed City status in 1981(Incheon was officially separated from Gyeonggi Province) is now home to a diverse student body from all backgrounds in Incheon. Among Bupyeong High School students, almost 80% enroll in a four-year college. The BHS was designated as charter public high school in 2024.

== History ==
- 1971 Established
- 1972 Opened
- 1975 Held the 1st commencement
- 1978 Founded ssireum club
- 1982 Founded football club
- 1994 Held the 20th commencement
- 2024 Constructed all new facilities
- 2024 designated as charter public high school

== Curriculum ==
Bupyeong High School offers Music, Fine Arts, Literature, General Science, General Math, Precalculus, Korean Language, Korean History, World History, Ethics, Economics, World Languages including English and Japanese, Classical Chinese (Hanmun), and a variety of Electives to students.

Upperclassmen are allowed to take Advanced English Language, Calculus, Physics, Chemistry and Biology as early as their 11th grade year. Among BHS students, almost 80% enroll in a four-year college.

== Cultural festival: Budeokje ==
The BHS has Bugeokje(Korean: 부덕제; Hanja: 富德祭) is the cultural festival held in November or December annually. Most students have been took part in chorus, dance, play, photography, sports, science experiments, and among other club programs show off their talents in the festival. Also, some clubs like chorus or K-pop dance from neighboring girl's high schools used to take part in the festival.

== Athletics ==
The BHS is famous for its excellent sports teams, especially football club and ssireum club. In 2018, the Bupyeong High School Football Club (BHSFC) became the champion of the National High School Football League sponsored by the president of the Republic of Korea. It was the 6th champion title.

In 2019, the Bupyeong High School Ssireum Club (BHSSC) became the high school champion team of the Haksan National Ssireum League.

== Notable alumni ==
=== Politics ===
- Lee Hak-jae, South Korean Politician 이학재_(정치인)
- Cha Jun-taek, South Korean Politician 차준택
- Choi Won-sik, South Korean Politician 최원식_(1963년)
- Maeng Sung-kyu, South Korean Politician 맹성규
- Yoo Young-rok, South Korean Politician 유영록
- Do Sung-hoon, South Korean Politician 도성훈
- Hong Cheol-ho, South Korean Politician 홍철호
- Noh Jong-myeon, South Korean Politician, Journalist, YTN News Presenter노종면

=== Media ===
- Kim Yeon-kwang, Journalist

=== Business ===
- Nam Bong-hyun, CEO of Incheon Port Authority (IPA)
- Kang Shin-woo, CIO of Korea Investment Corporation (KIC)

=== Sports ===
- Kim Bong-gil, South Korean Footballer
- Lee Chun-soo, South Korean Footballer
- Choi Tae-uk, South Korean Footballer
- Kim Nam-il, South Korean Footballer
- Noh Jung-yoon, South Korean Footballer
- Gwak Kyung-keun, South Korean Footballer
- Lee Lim-saeng, South Korean Footballer
- Kim Jung-woo, South Korean Footballer
- Kim Min-tae, South Korean Footballer
- Kim Seung-yong, South Korean Footballer
- Kim Young-chul, South Korean Footballer
- Kim Tae-ho, South Korean Footballer
- Kim Hyung-il, South Korean Footballer
- Do Hwa-sung, South Korean Footballer
- Park Byung-gyu, South Korean Footballer
- Park Sung-ho, South Korean Footballer
- Park Yong-ho, South Korean Footballer
- Park Won-hong, South Korean Footballer
- Baek Jong-hwan, South Korean Footballer
- An Sung-min, South Korean Footballer
- Ahn Hyeon-beom, South Korean Footballer
- An Hyo-yeon, South Korean Footballer
- Lee Keun-ho, South Korean Footballer
- Jeong Yeong-chong, South Korean Footballer
- Cho Yong-hyung, South Korean Footballer
- Ha Dae-sung, South Korean Footballer
- Ha Sung-min, South Korean Footballer
- Han Jae-woong, South Korean Footballer
- Ko Gyeong-cheol, South Korean Ssireum Wrestler고경철_(씨름_선수)
- Kasugaō Katsumasa, South Korean Sumo Wrestler

=== Entertainment ===
- Kwon Hyuk-soo, South Korean Actor
- Jeong Yoon-ho, South Korean Comedian 정윤호_(희극인)
