= Choi Min-hee =

South Korean journalist (born 1960)

Choi Min-hee (Korean: 최민희; born 3 December 1960) is a South Korean journalist and politician who serves in the National Assembly for Namyangju A, representing the Democratic Party.

In October 2026, in a leaked conversation in a private meeting, Choi claimed that President Lee Jae-Myung had opposed the impeachment of then-President Yoon Suk Yeol following the 2024 South Korean martial law crisis, preferring instead that Yoon voluntarily resign and cooperate with former Prime Minister Han Duck-soo. These remarks allegedly caused a rift within the Democratic Party, and while Choi subsequently apologized for the remarks following the leak, attributing them to a lapse in memory, she denied the remarks led to this rift. She claimed that the rift began in August 2026, when Kim Min-seok accused the rival pro-Jung Chung-rae faction, to which Choi belongs, of collaborating with the Shincheonji Church of Jesus to interfere in the party's August leadership election that Kim ultimately won, and for Kim not "genuinely" apologizing when he claimed the party had no evidence to prove his accusation. Three members of the Democratic Party's Supreme Council ultimately boycotted the ethics probe into Choi's comments about the impeachment on 15 November 2026. That same week, Choi also came under criticism for comments she made in a KakaoTalk group chat referring to journalists as "a pack of hyenas".

== Election results ==
=== General elections ===
Year	Elections	Constituency	Political party	Votes (%)	Results
2012	19th National Assembly General Election	Proportional representation (19th)	DUP	7,777,123 (36.45%)	Elected
2016	20th National Assembly General Election	Namyangju C (Gyeonggi)	Democratic	39,425 (38.42%)	Defeated (2nd)
2024	22nd National Assembly General Election	Namyangju A (Seoul)	Democratic	58,135 (51.08%)	Won

=== Local elections ===
==== Mayor of Gyeonggi Namyangju ====
Year	Elections	Constituency	Political party	Votes (%)	Remarks
2022	8th Iocal Election	Mayor of Gyeonggi Namyangju	Democratic	137,915 (46.55%)	Defeated (2nd)

== See also ==
- List of members of the National Assembly (South Korea), 2012–2016
- List of members of the National Assembly (South Korea), 2016–2020
- List of members of the National Assembly (South Korea), 2024–2028
