= Yoon Geum-soon =

South Korean politician and farmer (born 1959)

- 윤금순

Member of the National Assembly
- In office 30 May 2012 – 9 July 2012
- Constituency: Proportional representation

Personal details
- Born: 1 October 1959 (age 67)
- Citizenship: South Korea
- Party: Independent
- Other political affiliations: Unified Progressive Party; Democratic Labor Party

Yoon Geum-sun (Korean: 윤금순, born 1 October 1959) is a politician of the Unified Progressive Party who was a farmers' rights activist.

== History ==
Yoon Geum-sun was elected to the National Assembly in the 2012 South Korean legislative election as the number one proportional representation candidate for the Unified Progressive Party, but she announced her intention to resign following the controversy surrounding the party's rigged primary election. However, because her resignation would have resulted in the seat passing to Cho Yoon-sook, who was ranked seventh and refused to step down, the party decided to submit the resignation only after expelling the candidates who were refusing to withdraw. Consequently, Yoon temporarily retained her parliamentary seat, though she declared that she would forgo all associated benefits, including her salary. On 9 July 2012, the National Assembly approved Yoon's resignation, allowing Seo Ki-ho, the 14th-ranked proportional representation candidate, to succeed her in the seat.

Afterwards, she returned to farming. She currently lives in Seongju-gun, her husbands families hometown, where she grows Korean melons. In 2016, she campaigned against the deployment of THAAD on the Korean Peninsula.

=== Election results ===
Year	Election	Assembly	Position	Electoral system	Party	Votes	Vote share	Rank	Result	Notes
2012	2012 Legislative election	19th	Member of the National Assembly	Proportional representation	Unified Progressive Party	2,198,405	10.3%	1st	Elected	First-term

== See also ==
- List of members of the National Assembly (South Korea), 2012–2016
- Unified Progressive Party
- Lee Jung-hee
- Kim Jae-yeon
