= Chung Jin-hu =

South Korean teacher and politician (born 1957)

- 정진후

Floor leader of the Justice Party
- In office 9 June 2015 – 29 May 2016
- Preceded by: Sim Sang-jung
- Succeeded by: Roh Hoe-chan

Member of the National Assembly
- In office 30 May 2012 – 29 May 2016
- Constituency: Proportional representation

Personal details
- Born: 11 June 1957 (age 69)
- Party: Independent (2018–)
- Other political affiliations: Justice Party (2012–2018); Unified Progressive Party (2011–2012)

Chung Jin-hu (Korean: 정진후, born 6 November 1957) is a South Korean politician and former teacher.

He served as chairperson of the Korean Teachers and Education Workers Union (KTU) and was a proportional representation member of the 19th National Assembly, initially representing the Unified Progressive Party and later the Justice Party.

== Career ==
He served as a teacher at Anyang Arts High School before moving on to teach at Baegun Middle School and Suwon Jeil Middle School. In 2008, he was elected chairman of the Korean Teachers Union with 29,962 votes. In the 2012 South Korean legislative election, he was elected to the National Assembly as number four on the Unified Progressive Party proportional representation list. In 2012, he joined the Justice Party. He subsequently served as the floor leader of the Justice Party. He later became President of Gyeongju University.

== Election history ==
Year	Election	Term	Office	Constituency	Party	Votes	Vote share	Rank	Result	Notes
2012	2012 South Korean legislative election	19th	Member of the National Assembly	Proportional representation	Unified Progressive Party	2,198,405	10.30%	4th	Elected	First election
2016	2016 South Korean legislative election	20th	Member of the National Assembly	Dong-an-gu, Anyang, Gyeonggi	Justice Party	16,581	19.01%	3rd	Not elected	

== See also ==
- List of Members of the 19th National Assembly
- Unified Progressive Party
- Justice Party
