= Nakgasan =

Mountain in South Korea

Highest point
- Elevation: 235 m (771 ft)
- Coordinates: 37°41′26″N 126°19′21″E

Geography
- Location: South Korea

Korean name
- Hangul: 낙가산
- Hanja: 落袈山
- RR: Nakgasan
- MR: Nakkasan

Nakgasan (Korean: 낙가산) is a mountain in Incheon, South Korea. It sits on the island of Seongmodo in Ganghwa County. Nakgasan has an elevation of 235 m (771 ft).

== See also ==
- List of mountains in Korea
