= Yoo Jeong-bok =

South Korean politician (born 1957)

- 유정복
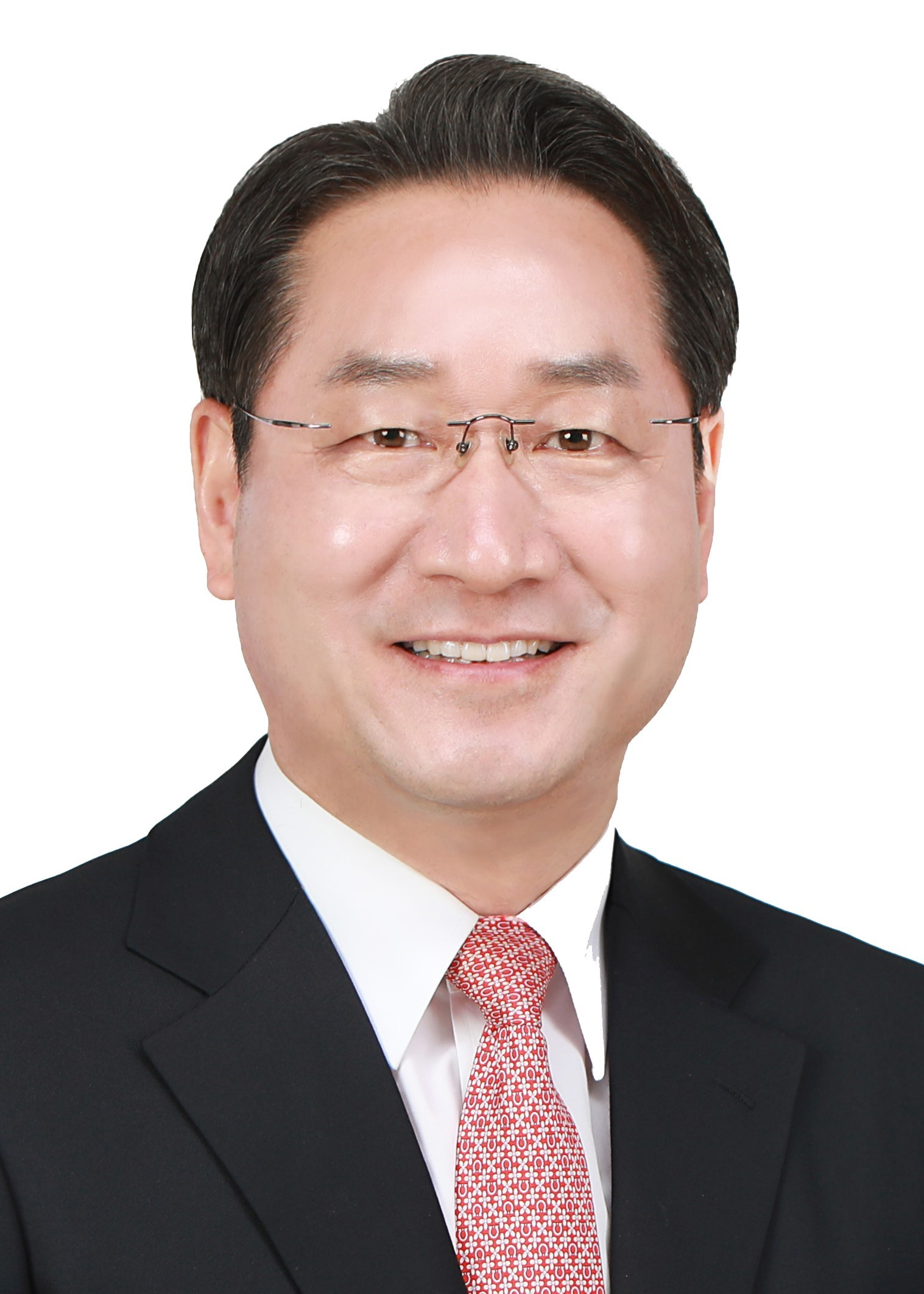

Mayor of Incheon
- In office 1 July 2022 – 30 June 2026
- Preceded by: Park Nam-choon
- Succeeded by: Park Chan-dae
- In office 1 July 2014 – 30 June 2018
- Preceded by: Song Young-gil
- Succeeded by: Park Nam-choon

Minister of Security and Public Administration
- In office 13 March 2013 – 6 March 2014
- President: Park Geun-hye
- Prime Minister: Chung Hong-won
- Preceded by: Position established
- Succeeded by: Kang Byung-kyu

Minister for Food, Agriculture, Forestry and Fisheries
- In office 30 August 2010 – 1 June 2011
- President: Lee Myung-bak
- Prime Minister: Yoon Jeung-hyun (acting); Kim Hwang-sik
- Preceded by: Jang Tae-pyung
- Succeeded by: Seo Kyu-yong

Member of the National Assembly
- In office 30 May 2004 – 15 May 2014
- Preceded by: Park Jong-woo
- Succeeded by: Hong Cheol-ho
- Constituency: Gimpo (Gyeonggi)

Personal details
- Born: 17 June 1957 (age 69) Jemulpo, Incheon, South Korea
- Party: People Power
- Education: Yonsei University (BA, PhD); Seoul National University (MPA)
- Religion: Roman Catholic (Christian name : Paul)

Korean name
- Hangul: 유정복
- RR: Yu Jeongbok
- MR: Yu Chŏngbok

Yoo Jeong-bok (Korean: 유정복; born 17 June 1957) is a South Korean politician who served as the Mayor of Incheon from 2014 to 2018 and from 2022 to 2026. A member of the People Power Party, he previously served as the Minister of security and public administration from 2013 to 2014.

== Life ==
Yoo Jeong-bok was born on 17 June 1957, in Songrim-dong of Dong District, Incheon. His parents were Internally displaced person from Cheongdan area, Hwanghae Province

He passed the civil service exam in his last year of college. After serving in the military, he became a public servant. In 1994, he was appointed a Mayor of Gyeonggi Gimpo County. He agreed absorption of Geomdan Myeon into Incheon and appointed as a Mayor of Incheon Seo District, which absorbed Geomdan Myeon. In 1995, South Korea expanded local autonomy. He resigned to run for 1995 South Korean local elections and elected as a mayor of Gimpo County. In 1998, Gimpo County was promoted to Gimpo. He served two terms for Mayor of Gyeonggi Gimpo. After the loss in 2002 South Korean local elections, he was elected as a member of the National Assembly to represent Gyeonggi Gimpo three times since 2004. In 2014, he resigned his seat in the National Assembly to run for Mayor of Incheon and was elected. He lost in the 2018 elections but was elected in 2022.

On 31 August 2022, he announced administrative reorganization plans for Incheon. Seohae District, Geomdan District will become a new separate District from Seo District(Seo District South area Seohae District, North area Geomdan District). Old downtown area of Jung District and Dong District will be merged into Jemulpo District and Yeongjong-Yongyu will be an independent Yeongjong District. Mayors of Jung, Dong and Seo District agreed this proposal.

On 9 April 2025, Yoo, a member of the People Power Party, announced his candidacy for the 2025 South Korean presidential election, saying he would "pave the way for proper national unity." He lost in the party primaries.

== Election results ==
=== General elections ===
Year	Elections	Constituency	Political party	Votes (%)	Results
2004	17th National Assembly General Election	Gimpo (Gyeonggi)	GNP	43,344 (47.74%)	Won
2008	18th National Assembly General Election	Gimpo (Gyeonggi)	GNP	44,551 (65.57%)	Won
2012	19th National Assembly General Election	Gimpo (Gyeonggi)	Saenuri	61,591 (56.48%)	Won
2020	21st National Assembly General Election	Namdong A (Incheon)	UFP	59,466 (44.44%)	Defeated (2nd)

=== Local Elections ===
==== Mayor of Incheon ====
Year	Elections	Constituency	Political party	Votes (%)	Results
2014	6th Iocal Election	Incheon (Mayoral Elections)	Saenuri	615,077 (49.95%)	Won
2018	7th Iocal Election	Incheon (Mayoral Elections)	LKP	470,937 (35.44%)	Defeated (2nd)
2022	8th Iocal Election	Incheon (Mayoral Elections)	PPP	634,250 (51.76%)	Won
2026	9th Iocal Election	Incheon (Mayoral Elections)	PPP	705,622 (46.06%)	Defeated (2nd)

==== Mayor of Gyeonggi Gimpo ====
Year	Elections	Constituency	Political party	Votes (%)	Results
1995	1st Iocal Election	Mayor of Gyeonggi Gimpo	Independent	18,298 (38.00%)	Won
1998	2nd Iocal Election	Mayor of Gyeonggi Gimpo	NCNP	29,625 (63.01%)	Won
2002	3rd Iocal Election	Mayor of Gyeonggi Gimpo	MDP	27,832 (45.35%)	Defeated (2nd)

National Assembly of the Republic of Korea
Preceded by Park Jong-woo	Member of the National Assembly for Gimpo (Gyeonggi); 30 May 2004–15 May 2014	Succeeded by Hong Cheol-ho
Political offices
Preceded by Jang Tae-pyung	Minister for Agriculture, Forestry and Fisheries; 30 August 2010–1 June 2011	Succeeded by Seo Kyu-yong
Preceded by New Office	Minister of Security Public Administration; 13 March 2013–6 March 2014	Succeeded by Kang Byung-kyu
Preceded by Song Young-gil	Mayor of Incheon; 1 July 2014–30 June 2018	Succeeded by Park Nam-choon
Preceded by Park Nam-choon	Mayor of Incheon; 1 July 2022–30 June 2026	Succeeded by Park Chan-dae
