= Manisan =

Manisan may refer to:

- Manisan (Incheon), a mountain of South Korea
- Manisan (Chungcheongbuk-do), a mountain of South Korea
