= Citizens Unity Party =

2011 political party in South Korea

- Leader: Lee Yong-sun
- Secretary-General: Choi Min-hee
- Founded: December 7, 2011
- Dissolved: December 18, 2011
- Split from: People's Participation Party; New Progressive Party
- Merged into: Democratic United Party
- Headquarters: 14-8 Yeouido-dong, Yeongdeungpo-gu, Seoul VIP Building Room 907
- Ideology: Liberalism; Social liberalism Pro-Roh Moo-hyun
- Political position: Centre to centre-left
- Colors: Yellow

Website
- tongnews.net

Korean name
- Hangul: 시민통합당
- RR: Simin tonghapdang
- MR: Simin t'onghaptang

The Citizens Unity Party (Korean: 시민통합당) was a South Korean political party within the democratic camp, formed primarily by figures from liberal civic groups and pro-Roh Moo-hyun factions. It was established with the aim of merging with the Democratic Party to create a new party.

== Party Founding Convention ==
Breaking away from the practice of holding party-founding conventions in conventional gymnasiums, the convention was held at Platoon Kunsthalle, a multicultural space located in Nonhyeon-dong, Gangnam District, Seoul.

== Grand Integration of the Opposition Bloc ==
After the Democratic Party resolved to merge on 11 December 2011, the Federation of Korean Trade Unions (FKTU) and the Citizens Unity Party agreed to complete the merger by the 18th.

== Leadership ==
- Party Leader
  - Lee Yong-sun
- Standing Representative
  - Kim Doo-kwan (Governor of South Gyeongsang Province at the time)
- Nam In-soon, Co-chair of the Preparatory Committee
- Moon Jae-in (Chairperson of the Roh Moo-hyun Foundation)
- Lee Hae-chan (Standing Representative of the Citizens Sovereignty)
