= Ahn Deok-su =

South Korean politician

- 안덕수

Member of the National Assembly
- In office 30 March 2012 – 12 March 2015
- Preceded by: Lee Gyong-jae
- Succeeded by: Ahn Sang-soo
- Constituency: Seo–Ganghwa B (Incheon)

Personal details
- Born: 26 January 1946 (age 80) Incheon, Korea
- Party: People Power

Korean name
- Hangul: 안덕수
- Hanja: 安德壽
- RR: An Deoksu
- MR: An Tŏksu

Ahn Deok-su (Korean: 안덕수, born 26 January 1946) is a South Korean politician. He served as a member of the National Assembly for the Saenuri Party between 2012 and 2015.

== Biography ==
Ahn was elected to the local council of Ganghwa County in 2006 as an independent, and was re-elected in 2010.

In the 2012 National Assembly elections he ran in the Seo–Ganghwa 2nd constituency in Incheon as a member of the Saenuri Party, and was elected with 51% of the vote. He lost his seat in March 2015 after his finance manager was jailed for violations of electoral law.
