= Sangbongsan =

Mountain in South Korea

Coordinates: 37°42′N 126°19′E

Highest point
- Elevation: 316 m (1,037 ft)

Geography
- Location: South Korea

Korean name
- Hangul: 상봉산
- Hanja: 上峰山
- RR: Sangbongsan
- MR: Sangbongsan

Sangbongsan (Korean: 상봉산) is a mountain in Incheon, South Korea. It sits on the island of Seongmodo in Ganghwa County. Sangbongsan has an elevation of 316 m (1,037 ft).

== See also ==
- List of mountains in Korea
