= Lee Hak-jae =

South Korean politician

Chairman and President of Incheon International Airport Corporation
- In office June 18, 2023 – February 23, 2026
- President: Yoon Suk Yeol; Han Duck-soo (acting); Choi Sang-mok (acting); Han Duck-soo (acting); Lee Ju-ho (acting); Lee Jae Myung
- Prime Minister: Han Duck-soo; Choi Sang-mok (acting); Han Duck-soo; Lee Ju-ho (acting); Kim Min-seok
- Preceded by: Kim Kyung-wook; Lee Hee-jung (acting)
- Succeeded by: Kim Beom-ho (acting); Park Nam-choon

Deputy Floor Leader of the Grand National Party
- In office 2014–2015

Member of the National Assembly
- In office May 30, 2008 – May 29, 2020
- Preceded by: Kim Kyo-heung
- Succeeded by: Kim Kyo-heung
- Constituency: Seo–Ganghwa A (Incheon, 2008–2016); Seo A (Incheon, 2016–2020)

Mayor of Incheon Seo District
- In office July 1, 2002 – December 11, 2007
- Preceded by: Park Hyun-yang
- Succeeded by: Baek In-Suk (acting); Lee Hoon-guk

Personal details
- Born: August 19, 1964 (age 62) Geomdan, Incheon, South Korea
- Education: Seoul National University; Chung-Ang University

Lee Hak-jae (born August 19, 1964) is a South Korean politician. Lee was the CEO and President of the Incheon International Airport Corporation, a member of the National Assembly, Deputy Floor Leader of the Grand National Party, and Mayor of Seo District, Incheon.

== Early life ==
Lee was born on August 19, 1964 in Gimpo, South Korea. Kim graduated from Bupyeong High School. Kim graduated from Seoul National University with a degree in animal science and Chung-Ang University with a master's and doctorate in economics.

== Career ==
In 1991, Lee was an employee of the Local Research Institute of the Ministry of Home Affairs. In 1992, Lee became a researcher for the Korea Rural Economic Institute. In 1993, Lee became a researcher for the Environmental Technology Development Institute. Lee became an executive committee member of the Incheon Environmental Movement Union. From 2002 to 2007, he was mayor of Seo District, Incheon.

In 2003, Lee became an advisor of the Incheon-China Economic Exchange Council. In 2004, Lee became chairman of the Incheon Taekkyeon Association. Lee was elected to the 18th National Assembly representing Seo-gu and Ganghwa-gap in 2008. In 2009 and 2010, Lee was the Deputy Floor Leader for the Grand National Party. In 2011, Lee became Chief of Staff to Park Geun-hye. In 2012, Lee was reelected to the National Assembly. Lee became the Chief of Staff of Park Geun-hye during her leadership of the Saenuri Party and presidential campaign. From 2013 to 2015, Lee was the President of the Korea Canoe Federation. In 2013 and 2014, Lee was the Chairman of the Saenuri Party Incheon City Committee.

In 2013, Lee was a member of the National Assembly Special Committee on the Development of Inter-Korean Relations. In 2014 and 2015, Lee was the Secretary of the National Assembly Special Committee on Budget and Accounts. In 2015, Lee became the Vice Chair of the Policy Committee of the Saenuri Party. In 2016, Lee was elected to the National Assembly representing Seo-gu-gap and became a member of the Korean Parliamentarians’ Coalition for Population and Development.

In 2017 and 2018, Lee was the Secretary of the National Assembly Land, Infrastructure, and Transport Committee. In 2018 Lee became the co-chair of the Incheon City Committee of the Bareunmirae Party, and the Chair of Intelligence Committee of the National Assembly.

In 2020, Lee became the Chairman of the Incheon City Committee of the United Future Party. In March 2021, Lee was appointed a special professor at Sangmyung University. In 2020, Lee was defeated in the general election for the 21st National Assembly. In June 2023, Lee became CEO and President of Incheon International Airport Corporation.

In March 2025, a Government Ethics Committee disclosure found that Lee was the richest executive under the Ministry of Land, Infrastructure and Transport. President Lee Jae Myung expressed his anger against Lee for avoiding a question relating to the illegal exportation of United States dollars by travelers. In January 2026, two employees of the airport sued Lee for abuse of authority. On February 23, 2026, Lee resigned run for Mayor of Incheon. In September 2026, the Anti-Corruption and Economic Crimes Investigation Unit of the Incheon Metropolitan Police Agency decided against charging Lee regarding accusations of abuse of authority.

== Election results ==
=== General elections ===
Year	Elections	Constituency	Political party	Votes (%)	Results
2008	18th National Assembly General Election	Seo–Ganghwa A (Incheon)	GNP	45,356 (53.80%)	Won
2012	19th National Assembly General Election	Seo–Ganghwa A (Incheon)	Saenuri	64,202 (52.65%)	Won
2016	20th National Assembly General Election	Seo A (Incheon)	Saenuri	52,595 (44.45%)	Won
2020	21st National Assembly General Election	Seo A (Incheon)	UFP	60,733 (42.50%)	Defeated (2nd)

=== Local elections ===
==== Mayor of Incheon Seo ====
Year	Elections	Constituency	Political party	Votes (%)	Remarks
2002	3rd Iocal Election	Mayor of Incheon Seo	GNP	37,216 (43.90%)	Won
2006	4th Iocal Election	Mayor of Incheon Seo	GNP	71,346 (63.06%)	Won

==== Incheon Seo Council ====
Year	Elections	Constituency	Political party	Votes (%)	Remarks
1995	1st Iocal Election	Incheon Seo Geomdan-Dong	Independent	3,925 (47.63%)	Won
