= Let's Go! People-Centered Party =

2011–2012 political party in South Korea

- Leader: Koo Cheon-seo
- Founded: October 25, 2011
- Dissolved: April 12, 2012
- Headquarters: Jeokseon, 1300 Sajik-ro, Jongno-gu, Seoul
- Ideology: Conservatism
- Political position: Right-wing
- Colors: Blue

Korean name
- Hangul: 가자! 대국민중심당
- RR: Gaja! Daegungmin jungsimdang
- MR: Kaja! Taegungmin chungsimdang

Let's Go! People-Centered Party (Korean: 가자!대국민중심당) was a conservative political party in South Korea that was founded on 25 October 2011, and dissolved on 12 April 2012.

The party was founded on 25 October 2011 by Yoon Young-o under the name New Hope Elderly Rights Coalition, initially positioning itself as a party dedicated to the interests of the elderly. Later, former National Assembly member Koo Cheon-seo joined the group and on the 5 March 2012, the party changed its name to "Let's Go! People-Centered Party. At the national convention held on 12 March 2012, he was appointed as party leader.

In the 19th National Assembly election held on 11 April 2012, the party fielded seven proportional representation candidates but no constituency candidates; it failed to secure a seat in the legislature, gaining only 0.28% of the vote. Consequently, the National Election Commission revoked the party's registration on 12 April 2012.

== Historical election results ==
=== National Assembly elections ===
Year	Election	Constituency		Proportional representation		Total seats	
		Seats won	Share	Seats won	Vote share	Seats won	Share
2012	19th	0/246	0%	0/54	0.22%	0/300	0%
