= Mayor of Incheon =

Mayor in South Korea

- 인천광역시장
- Seal of Incheon

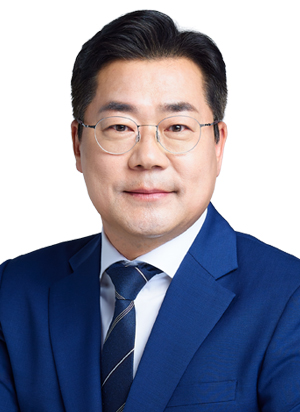
- Incumbent; Park Chan-dae since 1 July 2026
- Term length: Four years
- Inaugural holder: Lim Hong-jae
- Formation: 8 October 1945; 81 years ago

The Mayor of Incheon (Korean: 인천광역시장; Hanja: 仁川廣域市長) is the head of the local government of Incheon who is elected to a four-year term.

== List of mayors ==
=== Appointed mayors (before 1995) ===
From 1945 to 1995, the Mayor of Incheon was appointed by the President of the Republic of Korea.

=== Directly elected mayors (1995–present) ===
Since 1995, under provisions of the revised Local Government Act, the Mayor of Incheon is elected by direct election.

Political parties
Conservative
Liberal

Term	Portrait	Name (Birth–Death)	Term of office			Political party	Elected
Term	Portrait	Name (Birth–Death)	Took office	Left office	Time in office	Political party	Elected
1st		Choi Ki-sun 최기선 崔箕善 (1945–2018)	1 July 1995	30 June 2002	7 years, 0 days	Democratic Liberal → New Korea → Grand National → United Liberal Democrats	1995
2nd		Choi Ki-sun 최기선 崔箕善 (1945–2018)	1 July 1995	30 June 2002	7 years, 0 days	Democratic Liberal → New Korea → Grand National → United Liberal Democrats	1998
3rd		Ahn Sang-soo 안상수 安相洙 (born 1946)	1 July 2002	30 June 2010	8 years, 0 days	Grand National	2002
4th		Ahn Sang-soo 안상수 安相洙 (born 1946)	1 July 2002	30 June 2010	8 years, 0 days	Grand National	2006
5th		Song Young-gil 송영길 宋永吉 (born 1963)	1 July 2010	30 June 2014	4 years, 0 days	Democratic ('08) → Democratic United → Democratic ('11) → NPAD	2010
6th		Yoo Jeong-bok 유정복 劉正福 (born 1957)	1 July 2014	30 June 2018	4 years, 0 days	Saenuri → Liberty Korea	2014
7th		Park Nam-choon 박남춘 朴南春 (born 1958)	1 July 2018	30 June 2022	4 years, 0 days	Democratic	2018
8th		Yoo Jeong-bok 유정복 劉正福 (born 1957)	1 July 2022	30 June 2026	4 years, 0 days	People Power	2022
9th		Park Chan-dae 박찬대 朴贊大 (born 1967)	1 July 2026	Incumbent	108 days	Democratic	2026

== Elections ==
=== 1995 ===
1995 Incheon mayoral election
Party	#	Candidate	Votes	Percentage
Democratic Liberal	1	Choi Ki-sun	383,965	40.81%
Democratic	2	Shin Yong-seok	298,544	31.73%
United Liberal Democrats	3	Kang Woo-hyuk	258,175	27.44%
Total			940,684	100.00%
Voter turnout			62.02%	

=== 1998 ===
1998 Incheon mayoral election
Party	#	Candidate	Votes	Percentage
United Liberal Democrats	3	Choi Ki-sun	375,051	53.49%
Grand National	1	Ahn Sang-soo	238,708	34.04%
New National	4	Kim Ki-jae	87,327	12.45%
Total			701,086	100.00%
Voter turnout			43.19%	

=== 2002 ===
2002 Incheon mayoral election
Party	#	Candidate	Votes	Percentage
Grand National	1	Ahn Sang-soo	393,932	56.17%
Millennium Democratic	2	Park Sang-eun	225,210	32.11%
Democratic Labor	4	Kim Chang-han	35,234	5.02%
Green Peace	3	Shin Maeng-soon	29,473	4.20%
Socialist	5	Kim Young-kyu	17,404	2.48%
Total			701,253	100.00%
Voter turnout			39.32%	

=== 2006 ===
2006 Incheon mayoral election
Party	#	Candidate	Votes	Percentage
Grand National	2	Ahn Sang-soo	526,932	61.93%
Uri	1	Choi Ki-sun	200,650	23.58%
Democratic Labor	4	Kim Sung-jin	78,898	9.27%
Democratic	3	Shin Kyung-cheol	44,339	5.21%
Total			850,819	100.00%
Voter turnout			44.30%	

=== 2010 ===
2010 Incheon mayoral election
Party	#	Candidate	Votes	Percentage
Democratic	2	Song Young-gil	556,902	52.69%
Grand National	1	Ahn Sang-soo	469,040	44.38%
New Progressive	7	Kim Sang-ha	19,580	1.85%
Peace Democratic	8	Paik Seok-doo	11,258	1.06%
Total			1,056,780	100.00%
Voter turnout			50.91%	

=== 2014 ===
2014 Incheon mayoral election
Party	#	Candidate	Votes	Percentage
Saenuri	1	Yoo Jeong-bok	615,077	49.95%
NPAD	2	Song Young-gil	593,555	48.20%
Unified Progressive	3	Shin Chang-hyun	22,651	1.83%
Total			1,231,283	100.00%
Voter turnout			53.66%	

=== 2018 ===
2018 Incheon mayoral election
Party	#	Candidate	Votes	Percentage
Democratic	1	Park Nam-choon	766,186	57.66%
Liberty Korea	2	Yoo Jeong-bok	470,937	35.44%
Bareunmirae	3	Moon Byung-ho	54,054	4.06%
Justice	5	Kim Eung-ho	37,472	2.82%
Total			1,328,649	100.00%
Voter turnout			55.27%	

=== 2022 ===
2022 Incheon mayoral election
Party	#	Candidate	Votes	Percentage
People Power	2	Yoo Jeong-bok	634,250	51.76%
Democratic	1	Park Nam-choon	545,885	44.55%
Justice	3	Lee Jeong-mi	38,921	3.17%
Basic Income	4	Kim Han-byeol	6,079	0.49%
Total			1,225,135	100.00%
Voter turnout			48.95%	

=== 2026 ===
Candidate	Party	Votes	%
Park Chan-dae	Democratic Party	809,426	52.84
Yoo Jeong-bok (incumbent)	People Power Party	705,622	46.06
Rhee Kee-Bung	Reform Party	16,788	1.10
Total		1,531,836	100.00
Valid votes		1,531,836	98.90
Invalid/blank votes		17,078	1.10
Total votes		1,548,914	100.00
Registered voters/turnout		2,663,459	58.15
Democratic gain from People Power			

== See also ==
- Government of South Korea
- Politics of South Korea
