= Manisan (Incheon) =

Mountain in South Korea

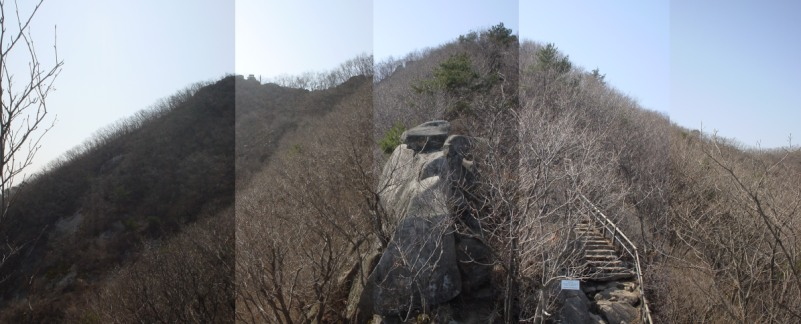

Highest point
- Elevation: 469.4 m (1,540 ft)
- Prominence: 469 m (1,539 ft)
- Coordinates: 37°36′41.77″N 126°26′5.38″E

Geography
- Location: Ganghwa County Incheon, South Korea

Korean name
- Hangul: 마니산
- Hanja: 摩尼山
- RR: Manisan
- MR: Manisan

Manisan (Korean: 마니산) is a mountain in Incheon, South Korea. It is situated in Ganghwa County and is the highest peak on Ganghwa Island. Manisan has an elevation of 469.4 m (1,540 ft). There is a popular hiking trail to the summit; at the summit is Chamseongsdan, an altar where Dangun (the founding father of Korea) performed ritual ceremonies.

== See also ==
- List of mountains in Korea
