= Kim Deok-soo =

South Korean footballer (born 1987)

Kim Deok-Soo
Personal information
- Full name: Kim Deok-Soo
- Date of birth: 24 April 1987 (age 39)
- Place of birth: South Korea
- Height: 1.90 m (6 ft 3 in)
- Position: Goalkeeper

Team information
- Current team: Siheung Citizen FC
- Number: 1

Youth career
- Woosuk University

Senior career*
Years	Team	Apps	(Gls)
2010–2011	Mokpo City	2	(0)
2012	Goyang Citizen		
2013	Bucheon FC	28	(0)
2021	Paju Citizen FC	14	(0)
2022-	Siheung Citizen FC	21	(0)
- * Club domestic league appearances and goals as of 19 December 2013

Kim Deok-Soo (Korean: 김덕수; born 24 April 1987) is a South Korean footballer who plays as goalkeeper for Siheung Citizen FC in K3 League.

== Career ==
He was selected by Bucheon FC 1995 in 2013 K League Draft. He made his debut against Suwon FC on 16 March 2013.
