= Lee Jung-hee =

South Korean politician (born 1969)

- 이정희

Personal details
- Born: December 22, 1969 (age 56) Seoul, South Korea
- Party: Unified Progressive Party
- Spouse: Shim Jae-hwan
- Occupation: Politician, lawyer, activist

Korean name
- Hangul: 이정희
- Hanja: 李正姬
- RR: I Jeonghui
- MR: I Chŏnghŭi

Lee Jung-hee (Korean: 이정희; born December 22, 1969) is a South Korean politician, lawyer and activist. She was a member of the 18th National Assembly of South Korea. She was one of the candidates for the 2012 presidential election.

== Biography ==
=== Early years ===
Lee was born in Seoul in 1969. A graduate of Somun Women's High School and Seoul National University, she joined the student movement in 1992. During her early years, she was a human rights, workers' rights, and women's rights activist.

=== Political activities ===
In 2007 she joined the Democratic Labor Party. She was elected as a member of the National Assembly in 2008.

In 2008 she was Vice Leader of Democratic Labor Party and next year was elected as the Democratic Labor Party's leader. In 2011, the DLP joined with other parties to form the Unified Progressive Party (UPP).

Lee Jung-hee was the UPP candidate in the 2012 South Korean presidential election. Lee admitted her entry in the race was mainly to castigate Park Geun-hye, the Saenuri Party candidate, whom she called the "first lady of the dictatorial era". Although she polled less than one percent, she was invited to join the presidential debate because her party had more than five seats in the National Assembly. In the debate, she drew controversy by referring to Park's father, former president and dictator Park Chung Hee, by his Japanese name; and by referring to the government in Seoul as "the government of the South"— a phrase rarely used in South Korea but commonly used by North Korea. Her performance was thought to have damaged fellow left-wing candidate Moon Jae-in's chances. On December 16, three days before the election, she withdrew from the contest, "in accordance with the people's hope for integrating (opposition) progressive, democratic and reform-minded forces to achieve a change of government" and warned that Park's victory would mean an "irrevocable regression of history". Park ultimately won the election; analysts suggested that Lee's attacks motivated the conservative Saenuri voters to turn out for Park.

On September 2, 2013, Lee declared that she would go on hunger strike to protest what she called the "witch hunt" against UPP member Lee Seok-ki, whom the National Intelligence Service charged with planning armed rebellion against the South Korean government.

On December 19, 2014, the Constitutional Court of Korea dissolved the UPP, finding the party "aimed at using violent means to overthrow our free democratic system"; it was the first time the constitutional court of Korea banned a political party since 1988. Lee Jung-hee denounced the decision, saying it "opened a dark age with an authoritarian decision" and turned South Korea into a "dictatorial country".

On April 8, 2020, Lee appeared on the official youtube for the Minjung Party and expressed support for the Minjung party in the 2020 South Korean legislative elections.

== Election results ==
Year	Elections	Constituency	Political party	Votes (%)	Results
2008	18th National Assembly General Election	Proportional representation (3rd)	MDP	973,445 (5.68%)	Elected
2012	2012 Presidential Election	South Korea	UPP	–	Resigned

== Books ==
- Love and Song and sick (2010)
- Future advances
- Learned woman

== See also ==
- Sim Sang-jung
- Roh Hoe-chan
- Ma Kwang-soo
- Kim Jae-yeon
- Yoon Geum-soon
