= Maeng Sung Kyu =

South Korean politician

Chairman of the National Assembly Land, Infrastructure and Transport Committee
- In office June 10, 2024 – 29 May 2026

Member of the National Assembly
- Incumbent
- Assumed office 14 June 2018
- Preceded by: Park Nam-choon
- Constituency: Namdong A (Incheon)

Vice Land Minister
- In office 1 June 2017 – 30 March 2018

Personal details
- Party: Democratic Party of Korea

Maeng Sung Kyu (Korean: 맹성규) is a South Korean politician. Maeng is a member of the South Korean National Assembly and Chairman of the Land, Infrastructure, and Transport Committee. In 2017, Maeng was made the Vice Land Minister.

In 2025, Maeng was part of a delegation to Canada meant to expand the cooperation between South Korea and Canada in the sectors of security, defense, and energy. In 2026, Maeng led a delegation to Canada to negotiate a submarine contract.

== Election results ==
Year	Elections	Constituency	Political party	Votes (%)	Results
2018	2018 By-election	Namdong A (Incheon)	Democratic	69,786 (61.62%)	Won
2020	21st National Assembly General Election	Namdong A (Incheon)	Democratic	72,773 (54.38%)	Won
2024	22nd National Assembly General Election	Namdong A (Incheon)	Democratic	73,764 (56.96%)	Won
