= Jeong Yeong-chong =

South Korean footballer (born 1992)

Personal information
- Date of birth: 24 June 1992 (age 34)
- Place of birth: Incheon, South Korea
- Height: 1.80 m (5 ft 11 in)
- Position: Forward

Team information
- Current team: FC Namdong

Youth career
- 2011–2014: Hanyang University

Senior career*
| Years | Team | Apps | (Gls) |
| 2015–2016 | Jeju United | 30 | (1) |
| 2017– | Gwangju FC | 34 | (5) |
| 2020- | → FC Namdong (loan) | | |
- * Club domestic league appearances and goals as of 1 January 2020

Jeong Yeong-chong (Korean: 정영총; born 24 June 1992) is a South Korean footballer who plays as forward for FC Namdong in K4 League.

== Career ==
He signed with Jeju United in January 2015. He scored his debut goal for Jeju United against FC Seoul on 6 June 2016.
