= Democratic Party (South Korea, 2013) =

2011–2014 political party in South Korea

- Founded: 15 December 2011 (Note: as Democratic United Party); 4 May 2013 (Note: as Democratic Party)
- Dissolved: 26 March 2014
- Merger of: Democratic Party (2008); Citizens Unity Party; Creative Korea Party (factions)
- Merged into: NPAD
- Ideology: Liberalism (South Korean); Social liberalism
- Political position: Centre to centre-left
- International affiliation: Progressive Alliance
- Colors: Blue (Note: Democratic Party) Historical: Yellow (Note: as Democratic United Party); Green (Note: as Democratic United Party)

- Democratic Party
- Hangul: 민주당
- Hanja: 民主黨
- RR: Minjudang
- MR: Minjudang

Democratic United Party
- Hangul: 민주통합당
- Hanja: 民主統合黨
- RR: Minju tonghapdang
- MR: Minju t'onghaptang

DUP logo (2011–2013)

Logo of the Democratic Party May 2013 to September 2013

The Democratic Party (DP; Korean: 민주당), formerly the Democratic United Party (DUP; 민주통합당) until 2013, was a liberal political party in South Korea, and for the duration of its existence the country's main opposition force.

On 15 December 2011, the Democratic Party, which had been the main opposition in the 18th Assembly, merged with the minor Citizens Unity Party to form the DUP. The Democratic United Party had strong connections with the Federation of Korean Trade Unions. The forming of the party took place against the background of the forthcoming April 2012 legislative election, in which the centre-left opposition sought to defeat the ruling Saenuri Party.

At the party's first congress on 15 January 2012, the DUP voted Han Myeong-sook chairwoman of the supreme council. Han was from 2006 to 2007 South Korea's first and so far only female Prime Minister. Han Myeong-sook vowed to retaliate against the Supreme Prosecutors' Office of South Korea for hiding corruption and malpractice by the Lee Myung-bak administration. The New Politics Alliance for Democracy followed the Party's position.

== List of leaders ==
=== Chairpersons ===
- Preceding party: Democratic Party (2008)

Won Hye-young and Lee Yong-sun (Interim, 21 November 2011 – 16 January 2012)

1. Han Myeong-sook (16 January 2012 – 16 April 2012)
  - Moon Sung-keun (Interim, 17 April 2012 – 3 May 2012)
  - Park Jie-won (Interim, 4 May 2012 – 8 June 2012)
2. Lee Hae-chan (9 June 2012 – 18 November 2012)
  - Moon Jae-in (Interim, 18 November 2012 – 28 December 2012)
  - Park Ki-choon (Interim, 28 December 2012 – 9 January 2013)
  - Moon Hee-sang (Emergency Response Commission, 9 January 2013 – 4 May 2013)
3. Kim Han-gil (since 4 May 2013)
- Succeeding party: New Politics Alliance for Democracy

=== Assembly leaders ===
1. Kim Jin-pyo (23 December 2011 – 4 May 2012)
2. Park Jie-won (4 May 2012 – 21 December 2012)
3. Park Ki-choon (21 December 2012 – 15 May 2013)
4. Jeon Byeong-hun (since 15 May 2013)

== Election results ==
=== President ===
Election	Candidate	Votes	%	Result
2012	Moon Jae-in	14,692,632	48.02	Lost

=== Legislature ===
Election	Leader	Constituency			Party list			Seats	Position	Status
Election	Leader	Votes	%	Seats	Votes	%	Seats	Seats	Position	Status
2012	Han Myeong-sook	8,156,045	37.85	106 / 246	7,777,123	36.46	21 / 54	127 / 300	2nd	Opposition
