= Seo District, Incheon =

1988–2026 district of Incheon, South Korea

Seo
- Autonomous District
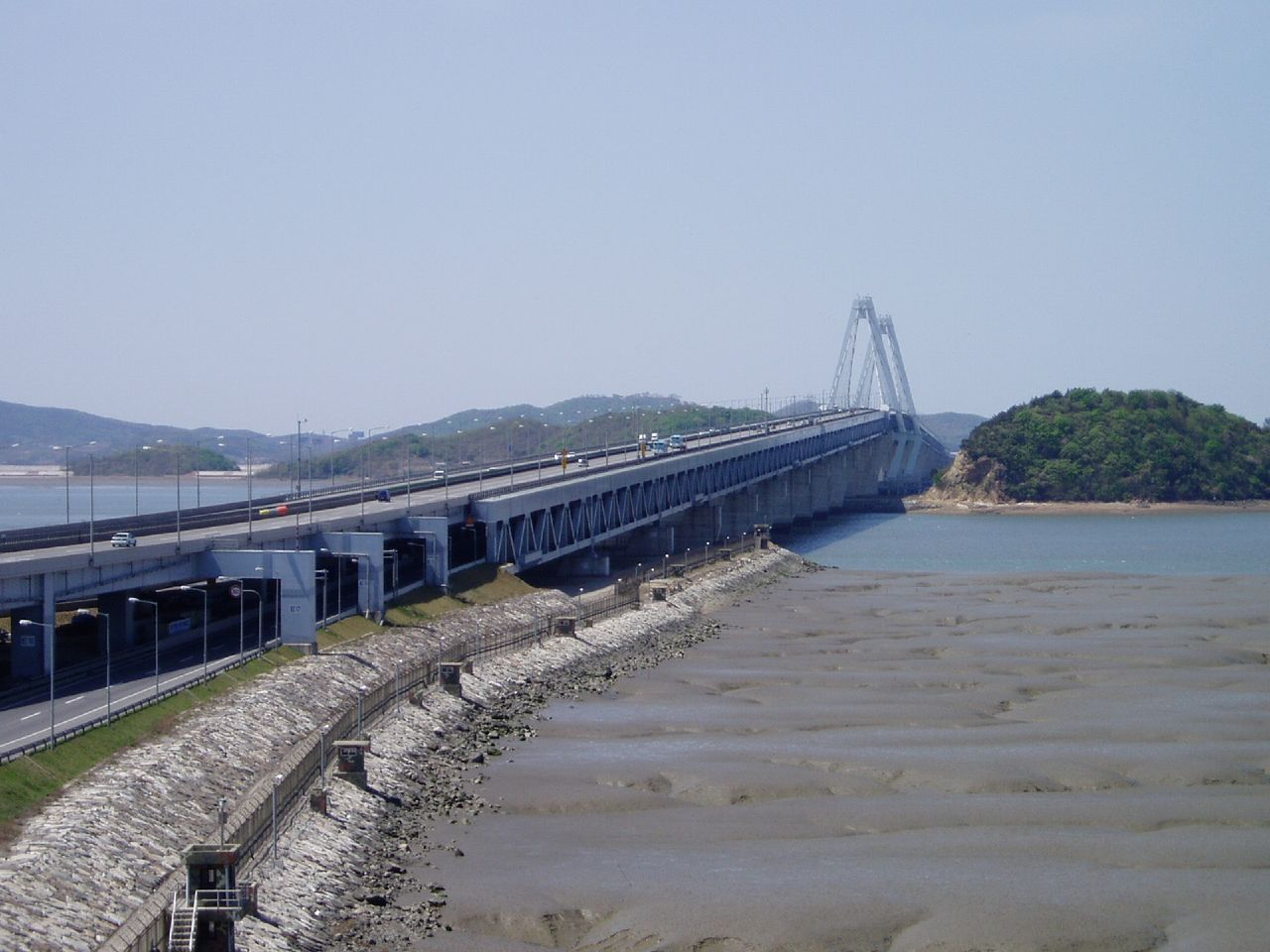
- Yeongjong Bridge

- Flag

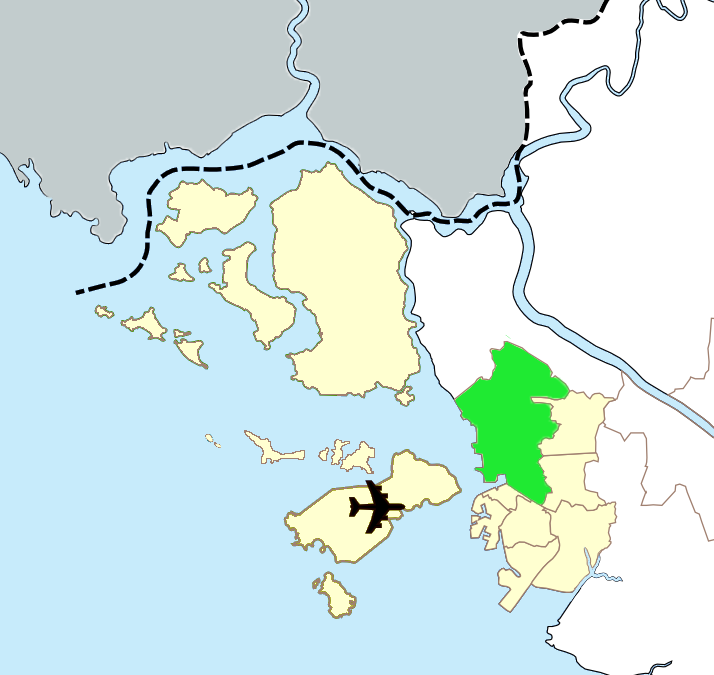
- Coordinates: 37.55°N 126.68°E
- Country: South Korea
- Region: Sudogwon
- Provincial level: Incheon

Area
  - Total: 137.12 km^{2} (52.94 sq mi)

Population (September 2024)
  - Total: 631,652
  - Density: 4,606.6/km^{2} (11,931/sq mi)
  - Dialect: Seoul
- Website: Seo District Office

Korean name
- Hangul: 서구
- Hanja: 西區
- RR: Seo-gu
- MR: Sŏ-gu

Seo District (Korean: 서구; lit. 'West District') was the largest district in Incheon, South Korea. It was established in 1988 and then made defunct on July 1, 2026. Its former area was split into Seohae District and Geomdan District.

It had an area 111.2 square kilometres (42.9 sq mi), and it had the largest area of farmland in Incheon. Before Seo District was part of Buk District. In 1988, a part of the ward was separated to form the district.

== History ==
=== Before formation ===
- 1413: Seokgot-myeon, Mowolgot-myeon, Bupyeongdoho-bu
- 1895: Seokgot-myeon, Mowolgot-myeon, Bupyeong-gun, Incheon-bu
- 1896: Seokgot-myeon, Mowolgot-myeon, Bupyeong-gun, Gyeonggi-do
- 1914: Seogot-myeon, Bucheon-gun
- April 1, 1940: Included in Incheon-bu
- August 15, 1949: Seogot Branch, Incheon
- January 1, 1968: Segot Branch, Buk-gu, Incheon
- July 1, 1981: Seogot Branch, Buk-gu, Incheon Direct Governing City

=== After formation ===
- January 1, 1988: Part of Buk-gu absorbed by Seo-gu
- March 1, 1995: Annex of Geomdan-myeon, Gimpo-gun, Gyeonggi-do.
- January 1, 2002: Division of Geomdan-dong into Geomdan-1-dong and Geomdan-2-dong.
- September 1, 2005: Sub-division of Geomdan-1-dong and Geomdan-2-dong into Geomdan-3-dong.
- September 1, 2006: Geomdan-1-dong sub-divided into Geomdan-1-dong and Geomdan-4-dong.
- September 17, 2008: Name change of Bulno-dong to Bullo-dong.
- June 10, 2010: Absorption of Cheongna-dong, of parts of Gyeonseo-dong-Yeonhui-dong-Wonchang-dong.
- July 9, 2012: Sub-division of Cheongna-dong into Cheongna-1-dong and Cheongna-2-dong.
- September 2, 2013: Sub-division of parts of Geomdan-1-dong (Oryu-dong, Wanggil-dong) into Geomdan-5-dong, and transfer of metropolitan area landfill from Geomamgyeongseo-dong to Geomdan-5-dong.
- July 1, 2026: Made defunct and split into Seohae District and Geomdan District

== Education ==
International schools:

- Cheongna Dalton School

== Administrative Divisions of Incheon Seo-gu ==
Administrative divisions

- Geomam-Gyeongseo-dong (검암경서동)
- Sinhyeon-Wonchang-dong (신현원창동)
- Yeonhui-dong (연희동)
- Gajeong 1 to 3 Dong (가정1~3동)
- Seongnam 1 to 3 Dong (석남1~3동)
- Gajwa 1 to 4 Dong (가좌1~4동)
- Geomdan 1 to 4 Dong (검단1~4동)

== See also ==
- Cheongna International City
