= Ganghwa County =

Coordinates: 37°44′20″N 126°29′22″E

Ganghwa
- County
- Gyodong Island A panoramic view of the Seongmo Island

- Flag

- Location of Ganghwa County in South Korea
- Country: South Korea
- Region: Sudogwon
- Provincial level: Incheon
- Administrative divisions: 1 eup, 13 myeon, 96 ri

Area
  - Total: 411.4 km^{2} (158.8 sq mi)

Population (September 2024)
  - Total: 68,891
  - Density: 167.5/km^{2} (433.7/sq mi)
  - Dialect: Seoul
- Website: Ganghwa County Office

Korean name
- Hangul: 강화군
- Hanja: 江華郡
- RR: Ganghwa-gun
- MR: Kanghwa-gun

Ganghwa County (Korean: 강화군) is a county in Incheon, South Korea. The county is composed of Ganghwa Island and the minor islands around it.

== History ==
Ganghwa County contains some of the most important historical sites in Korea. These sites cover the prehistoric old and new stone ages as well as the bronze and iron ages.

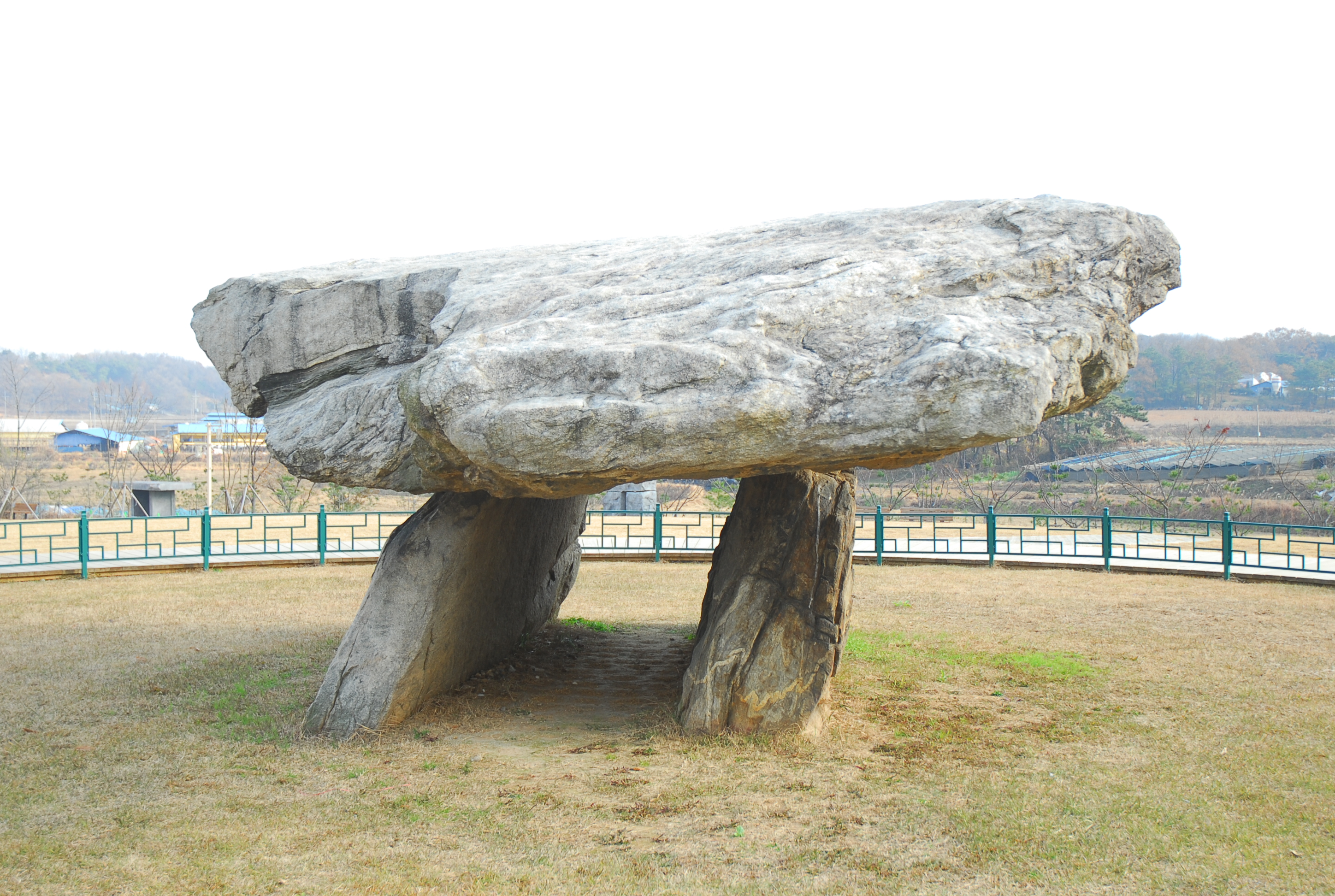
An example of a dolmen on Ganghwa

Ganghwa Island is rich in dolmen that have been designated as World Heritage Sites. There are about 150 dolmen on the island. Their distribution shows they were closely related to fishing in the Bronze Age although they are now separated from the sea. They are located on the slopes of mountains and are thus higher in elevation than their counterparts. It is believed but not proven that the Ganghwa dolmen are the earliest Korean ones made because the dolmen in Bugeun-ri and Gocheon-ri resemble those in Ganghwa.

Dangun, the founder of Gojoseon, is said to have made an altar on top of Mani-san and offered sacrifices to his ancestors.

In the 9th century, the Unified Silla established a garrison on the island to combat piracy. Their commander, Wang Geon, established his military reputation at the garrison and later went on to found the Kingdom of Goryeo. In the 13th century, the court of Goryeo took refuge on the island as Mongol forces invaded in 1232. After Goryeo capitulated to the Mongols, the elite forces on the island rose up and began the Sambyeolcho Rebellion.

In the early 19th century, Catholicism was introduced into Korea despite its official proscription by the Korean court. The Korean court clamped down on the illicit French missionaries, massacring French Catholic missionaries and Korean converts alike which led to the French launching a punitive expedition to Korea in 1866. The encounter lasted nearly six weeks. In the first battle, a Korean infantry division suffered heavy losses, and Korean general Yang Heon-su concluded that only a large cavalry division could stand up to French firepower. On 9 November, the French forces were routed when they attempted to occupy the strategically important Cheondeung Temple on the island's south coast. Stiff Korean resistance coupled by the overwhelming numerical superiority of the Korean defenders, now numbering 10,000 men, forced a French retreat with dozens of casualties but no deaths, ultimately resulting in the French retreating and abandoning the island.

In 1871, following the General Sherman Incident, the United States Navy launched an expedition against the soldiers at Ganghwa Island, resulting in the Battle of Ganghwa.

In 1875, the Japanese ship Unyo made an incursion into the island's restricted coastal zone under the guise of measuring the coastline. It fired a few shots at the fortress on the island. When the Unyo sent a boat to the island, the Korean garrison fired a few shots back. The Japanese argued that this was an aggressive act and demanded concessions. Early in the following year, Japan sent a large Imperial Japanese Navy fleet to Korea which forced the government to sign the unequal Treaty of Ganghwa. That agreement, concluded on Ganghwa Island, officially opened Korea to Japanese trade for the first time in the 19th century.

Ganghwa was raised to the status of county in 1906 and incorporated into the Incheon Metropolitan City in 1995.

== Climate ==
Climate data for Ganghwa (1991–2020 normals, extremes 1972–present)
Month	Jan	Feb	Mar	Apr	May	Jun	Jul	Aug	Sep	Oct	Nov	Dec	Year
Record high °C (°F)	12.6 (54.7)	17.4 (63.3)	22.3 (72.1)	29.2 (84.6)	31.0 (87.8)	33.2 (91.8)	35.5 (95.9)	35.8 (96.4)	31.7 (89.1)	28.3 (82.9)	23.8 (74.8)	16.0 (60.8)	35.8 (96.4)
Mean daily maximum °C (°F)	1.7 (35.1)	4.5 (40.1)	9.8 (49.6)	16.2 (61.2)	21.4 (70.5)	25.4 (77.7)	27.6 (81.7)	29.0 (84.2)	25.5 (77.9)	19.5 (67.1)	11.5 (52.7)	3.9 (39.0)	16.3 (61.3)
Daily mean °C (°F)	−3.2 (26.2)	−0.7 (30.7)	4.6 (40.3)	10.7 (51.3)	16.0 (60.8)	20.5 (68.9)	23.7 (74.7)	24.7 (76.5)	20.2 (68.4)	13.7 (56.7)	6.3 (43.3)	−0.9 (30.4)	11.3 (52.3)
Mean daily minimum °C (°F)	−8.1 (17.4)	−5.8 (21.6)	−0.6 (30.9)	5.3 (41.5)	11.0 (51.8)	16.3 (61.3)	20.6 (69.1)	21.2 (70.2)	15.6 (60.1)	8.1 (46.6)	1.2 (34.2)	−5.7 (21.7)	6.6 (43.9)
Record low °C (°F)	−22.5 (−8.5)	−19.4 (−2.9)	−11.3 (11.7)	−4.4 (24.1)	1.6 (34.9)	6.9 (44.4)	12.7 (54.9)	12.5 (54.5)	3.0 (37.4)	−4.2 (24.4)	−12.0 (10.4)	−19.8 (−3.6)	−22.5 (−8.5)
Average precipitation mm (inches)	15.6 (0.61)	22.5 (0.89)	31.4 (1.24)	64.9 (2.56)	110.9 (4.37)	110.0 (4.33)	355.6 (14.00)	300.4 (11.83)	131.5 (5.18)	55.8 (2.20)	46.3 (1.82)	21.3 (0.84)	1,266.2 (49.85)
Average precipitation days (≥ 0.1 mm)	5.0	4.8	6.0	7.5	8.2	8.6	14.1	11.9	7.4	5.6	7.5	6.6	93.2
Average snowy days	7.3	4.3	2.4	0.2	0.0	0.0	0.0	0.0	0.0	0.1	1.5	5.1	20.6
Average relative humidity (%)	63.6	61.0	61.4	62.4	68.6	75.1	82.8	79.9	73.8	68.9	67.8	65.4	69.2
Mean monthly sunshine hours	186.2	186.5	217.0	221.7	235.3	208.5	153.0	184.9	203.8	214.3	166.0	171.8	2,349
Percentage possible sunshine	58.7	61.8	58.9	59.0	54.8	50.0	38.6	47.7	57.4	63.3	55.7	55.6	54.6
Source: Korea Meteorological Administration (snow and percent sunshine 1981–2010)

== Economy ==
About 70% of Ganghwa's citizens are engaged in farming with rice as the main commodity. Other occupations include fishery and forestry.

Hwamunseok is a well-known traditional woven mat that has been produced and exported to China and Japan since the Goryeo dynasty. The mats are produced in the home handicraft industry. During the Joseon dynasty over 100 years, craftsman Han Chunggyo from the white-mat producing village Yango-ri in Haesongmyeon successfully designed his own product. Thereafter, various designs have been developed and manufacturing techniques have been improved.

The Ganghwa turnip is another specialty of the area. It has been cultivated since the 5th century as recorded in the 17th-century Dongui Bogam, a book of oriental medicine.

== Culture ==
In Ganghwa County, dolmens are registered by UNESCO as a World Heritage Site. In three regions of South Korea including Hwasun and Gochang, Ganghwa's dolmens are famous sites to study ancient culture.

== Administrative divisions ==
Administrative divisions

- Ganghwa-eup (강화읍)
- Seonwon-myeon (선원면)
- Bureun-myeon (불은면)
- Gilsang-myeon (길상면)
- Hwado-myeon (화도면)
- Yangdo-myeon (양도면)
- Naega-myeon (내가면)
- Hajeom-myeon (하점면)
- Yangsa-myeon (양사면)
- Songhae-myeon (송해면)
- Gyodong-myeon (교동면)
- Samsan-myeon (삼산면)
- Seodo-myeon (서도면)

== Sister cities ==
- Soeda, Japan
