= 2012 South Korean legislative election =

- 11 April 2012

All 300 seats in the National Assembly 151 seats needed for a majority
- Turnout: 54.24% (▲8.16pp; Const. votes); 54.24% (▲8.16pp; PR votes)
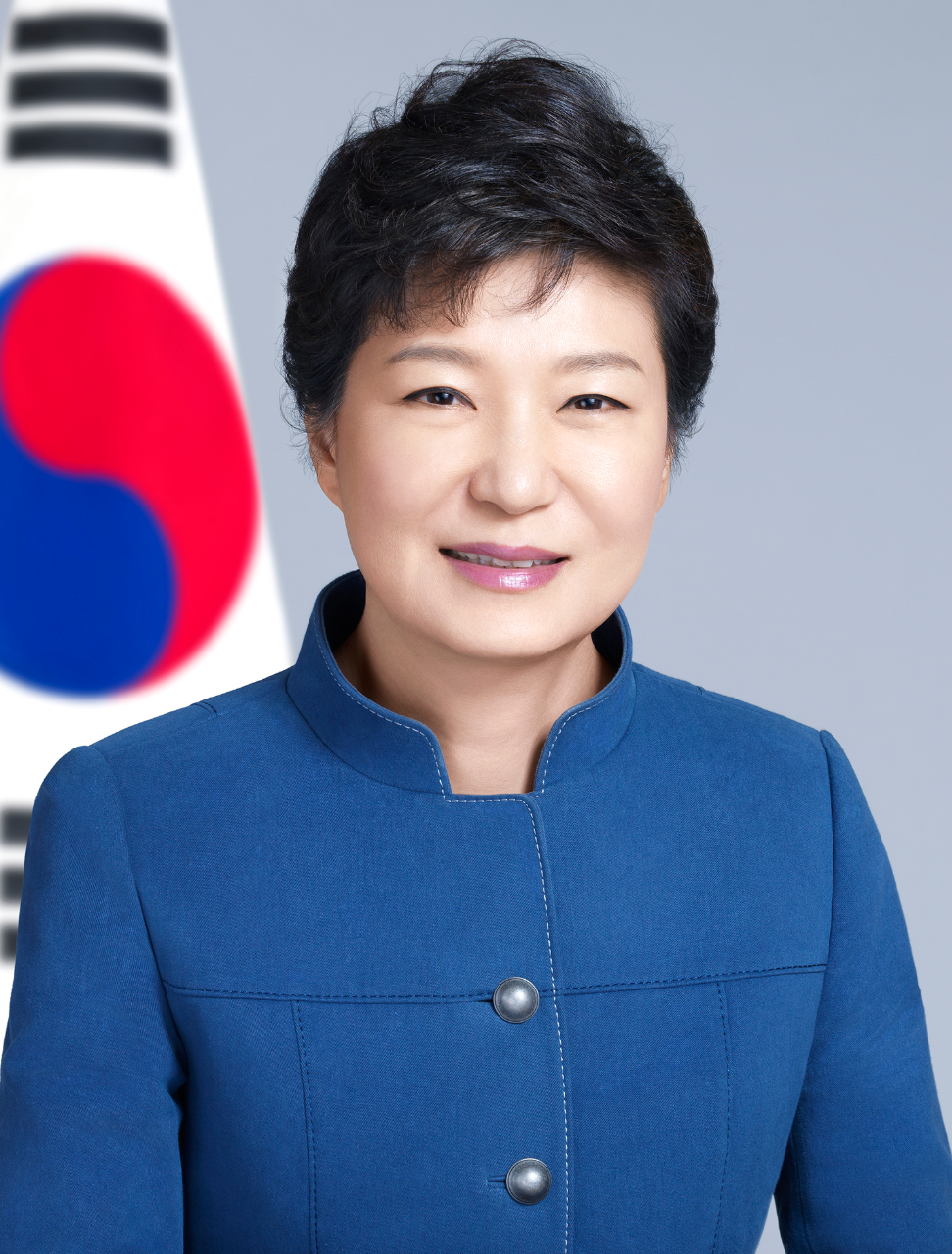

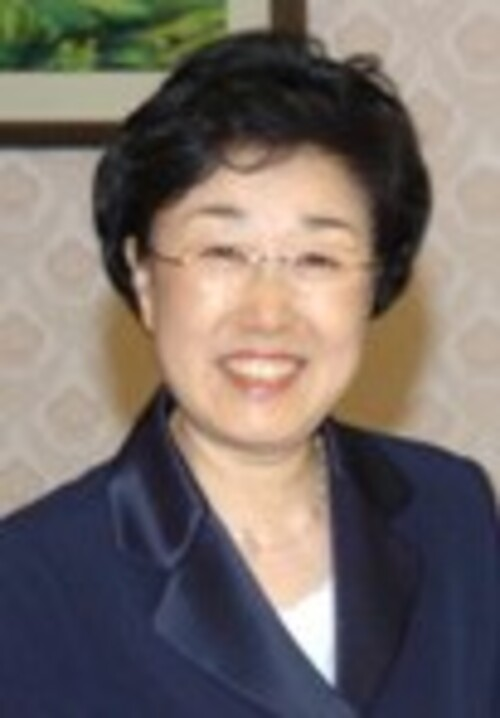

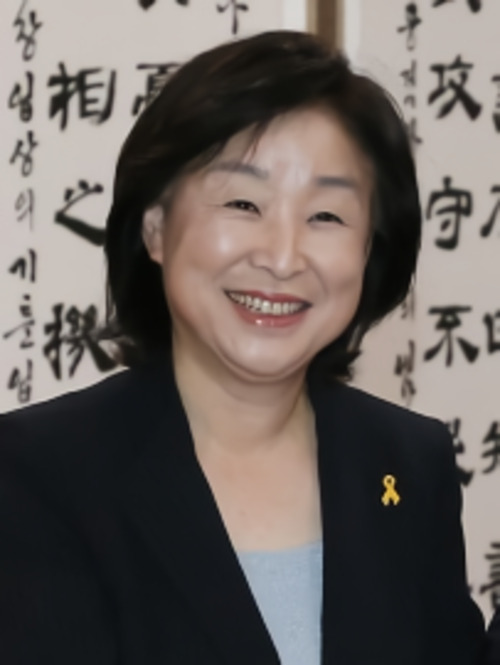
	Majority party	Minority party
Leader	Park Geun-hye	Han Myeong-sook
Party	Saenuri	Democratic United
Last election	167 seats (Note: Grand National Party and Future Hope Alliance)	81 seats (Note: as Democratic Party)
Seats won	152	127
Seat change	▼15	▲46
Constituency vote	9,324,911	8,156,045
% and swing	43.28% (▼3.87pp)	37.85% (▲8.93pp)
Regional vote	9,130,651	7,777,123
% and swing	42.80% (▼7.86pp)	36.46% (▲11.28pp)
	Third party	Fourth party
Leader	Lee Jung-hee; Rhyu Si-min; Sim Sang-jung	Sim Dae-pyung
Party	Unified Progressive	Liberty Forward
Last election	5 seats (Note: as Democratic Labor Party)	18 seats
Seats won	13	5
Seat change	▲8	▼13
Constituency vote	1,291,306	474,001
% and swing	5.99% (▲2.60pp)	2.20% (▼3.52pp)
Regional vote	2,198,405	690,754
% and swing	10.31% (▲4.63pp)	3.24% (▼3.61pp)
- Results of the election.
Speaker before election
Chung Eui-hwa
Saenuri
Elected Speaker
Kang Chang-hee
Saenuri

Legislative elections were held in South Korea on 11 April 2012. The election was won by the ruling Saenuri or New Frontier Party, which renewed its majority in the National Assembly, despite losing seats. The election was read as a bellwether for the presidential election to be held later in the year. The result confounded exit polls and media analysis, which had predicted a closer outcome.

== Background ==
The South Korean National Assembly consists of 246 directly elected seats and 54 nationwide proportional representation seats chosen under an FPTP-PR parallel voting system. Proportional seats were only available to parties which one three percent of the national valid vote among seat-allocated parties and/or won five or more constituency seats. In South Korea's presidential system, the head of state controls the executive, but the loss of control in congress could have hampered President Lee's ability to govern alone.

== Political parties ==
Parties	Leader	Ideology	Seats		Status
Parties	Leader	Ideology	Last election	Before election	Status
Saenuri Party	Park Geun-hye	Conservatism	153 / 299 (Note: as Grand National Party)	163 / 299	Government
Saenuri Party	Park Geun-hye	Conservatism	14 / 299 (Note: Future Hope Alliance)	163 / 299	Government
Democratic United Party	Han Myeong-sook	Liberalism	81 / 299	79 / 299	Opposition
Liberty Forward Party	Lee Hoi-chang	Conservatism	18 / 299	13 / 299	Opposition
Unified Progressive Party	Lee Jung-hee; Rhyu Si-min; Sim Sang-jung	Progressivism	5 / 299	7 / 299	Opposition
Creative Korea Party	Han Myeon-hee	Centrist reformism	3 / 299	0 / 299	Opposition

Four parties won seats in the 2012 election:

- Saenuri Party (Korean: 새누리당, Saenuri-dang), led by Park Geun-hye.
  The largest conservative party and incumbent government. Formerly name the Grand National Party, the party was renamed in February after a period of internal crisis in which an Emergency Response Commission assumed control of the party.
- Democratic United Party (Korean: 민주통합당, Minju Tonghap-dang), led by Han Myeong-sook. The largest liberal party and principal opposition.
- Liberty Forward Party (Korean: 자유선진당, Jayu Seonjin-dang), led by Sim Dae-pyung. The second-largest conservative party with its primary support base in Chungcheong.
- Unified Progressive Party (Korean: 통합진보당, Tonghap Jinbo-dang), led jointly by Rhyu Si-min, Lee Jung-hee, and Sim Sang-jeong. The largest left-progressive party.

Other parties that put forward candidates included the left-wing New Progressive Party and the centre-right Korea Vision Party.

The conservative parties were fragmented, particularly between Saenuri and the new KVP over the latter recruiting high-profile defected members of the incumbent party and those who were denied tickets in the election, which was also reflective of a division grew between Park's leadership and loyalists of Lee Myung-bak. However, the DUP–UPP coalition also came under strain due to irregularities in the UPP's primaries that involved co-leader Lee Jung-hee.

== Campaign ==
Campaigning for the election officially began on 29 March, though party leaders toured the country beforehand to rally support for their bids. The international media suggested that the main issues in the campaign were economic, including inflation, educational and housing costs, unemployment and underemployment, the income gap, and social welfare, while the North Korean issue did not play a role.

The opposition DUP tried to harness discontent with the incumbent Lee's administration, and called on the electorate to adjudge the election as a referendum on Lee's presidency. The opposition coalition endeavored to depict the ruling party as unsocial and favoring the rich, while promising to create jobs. The incumbent government emphasised the threat of North Korea and made the case for continuing their hard line towards the northern neighbour and maintaining a close alliance with the United States. They accused the opposition of jeopardising the free trade agreement with the U.S. The DUP had demanded renegotiation of the treaty and threatened to cancel it in case of the United States' refusal to negotiate.

The international media highlighted the candidacy of Cho Myung-chul, a professor who defected from North Korea in 1994. In its newspaper Rodong Sinmun, the North Korean Workers' Party called on the electorate to vote out the incumbent government: "Young voters, students and people must deliver a crushing defeat to the traitors."

=== Scandals ===
After accusations of unauthorized government surveillance surfaced, legislators called for an investigation, while the ruling party accused the previous government of doing the same. The presidential office published an analysis stating that 84% of the recorded incidents had taken place under the previous administration of Roh Moo-hyun. A post-election analysis by polling institute Realmeter showed that the ruling party's handling of scandal was effective, and that the surveillance scandal didn't affect voters' decision much. A DUP candidate, Kim Yong-min, was also accused of having made numerous offensive comments on the podcast-talk-show Naneun Ggomsuda, for which he apologized but refused to rescind his candidacy, despite the DUP leadership advising him to do so. Kim subsequently failed to win his seat in the election.

== Opinion polling ==
Polls were barred in the final week of the election, just before indications suggested the two largest parties would get somewhere between 130 and 135 seats each. A high turnout, particularly with the youth, was seen as beneficial to the opposition.

Institute	Date	Saenuri (SP)	Democratic United (DUP)	Unified Progressive (UPP)	Liberty Forward (LFP)	Korea Vision (KVP)	New Progressive (NPP)
Realmeter	23 December 2011	31.2%	30.9%	6.1%	2.2%	–	1.3%
Realmeter	13 January 2012	29.5%	34.7%	3.2%	2.4%	–	1.8%
Realmeter	Jan.25–27, 2012	30.3%	37.1%	4.0%	2.0%	–	1.0%
Realmeter	Jan.30–Feb.2, 2012	32.9%	36.9%	3.9%	1.5%	–	0.9%
Realmeter	Feb.6–10, 2012	33.9%	35.8%	4.2%	2.4%	–	0.8%
Hankyoreh / KSOI	Feb.24–25, 2012	38.2%	32.9%	3.1%	1.7%	1.5%	1.1%
Realmeter	Feb.27–Mar.2, 2012	36.3%	36.3%	6.1%	1.7%	0.4%	–
Realmeter	5–9 March 2012	40.3%	32.7%	4.8%	2.3%	–	–
KBS^{[nb 2]}	10–11 March 2012	34.1%	35.4%	3.6%	1.7%	–	–
Realmeter	12–16 March 2012	39.4%	33.7%	5.7%	2.3%	–	–
Realmeter	19–23 March 2012	37.4%	33.3%	7.5%	2.1%	–	–
Realmeter	26–30 March 2012	39.8%	30.5%	8.1%	2.3%	–	–
Realmeter^{[nb 3]}	28 March 2012	37.8%	30.5%	12.1%	2.3%	1.9%	1.6%
Hankyoreh / KSOI	31 March 2012	38.3%	33.5%	7.2%	2.4%	0.3%	1.0%
Research View	1 April 2012	42.3%	29.5%	9.7%	3.9%	1.1%	2.1%

== Results ==
The voting centres were open from 6:00−18:00. Voting occurred via electronic ballot counting and scanning that gave an instantaneous result. Cho Myung-chul's successful candidature was the first time that one of the 23 thousand North Korean refugees living in the South was elected to the National Assembly.

Graph of the party split among 300 seats.
Party	Proportional			Constituency			Total seats	+/–
Party	Votes	%	Seats	Votes	%	Seats	Total seats	+/–
Saenuri Party	9,130,651	42.80	25	9,324,911	43.28	127	152	–15
Democratic United Party	7,777,123	36.46	21	8,156,045	37.85	106	127	+46
Unified Progressive Party	2,198,405	10.31	6	1,291,306	5.99	7	13	+8
Liberty Forward Party	690,754	3.24	2	474,001	2.20	3	5	–13
Christian Liberal Democratic Party	257,190	1.21	0	2,241	0.01	0	0	0
New Progressive Party	243,065	1.14	0	101,614	0.47	0	0	0
Hannara Party	181,822	0.85	0	454	0.00	0	0	New
Korea Vision Party	156,241	0.73	0	44,379	0.21	0	0	New
Pro-Park United	134,898	0.63	0	25,302	0.12	0	0	New
Green Party Korea	103,842	0.49	0	4,843	0.02	0	0	New
Creative Korea Party	91,935	0.43	0	3,624	0.02	0	0	–3
Youth Party	73,194	0.34	0	5,569	0.03	0	0	New
Let's Go! People-Centered Party	60,428	0.28	0				0	New
Korean Christian Party	54,332	0.25	0				0	New
Authentic Democratic Party	48,648	0.23	0	71,867	0.33	0	0	New
United Buddhist Party	36,262	0.17	0	68	0.00	0	0	New
People's Happiness Party	35,846	0.17	0	18,028	0.08	0	0	New
Party for Culture and Art	23,330	0.11	0				0	0
Future Union	19,962	0.09	0	5,403	0.03	0	0	New
Great Korea Party	14,133	0.07	0	887	0.00	0	0	New
Democratic Unification Party				524	0.00	0	0	New
People's Power				153	0.00	0	0	New
Independents				2,014,777	9.35	3	3	–22
Total	21,332,061	100.00	54	21,545,996	100.00	246	300	+1
Valid votes	21,332,061	97.82		21,545,996	98.87			
Invalid/blank votes	474,737	2.18		246,855	1.13			
Total votes	21,806,798	100.00		21,792,851	100.00			
Registered voters/turnout	40,205,055	54.24		40,181,623	54.24			
Source: NEC, CLEA, IPU

=== By city/province ===
Constituency results by city/province
Region	Saenuri		DUP		UPP		LFP		Ind.		Total seats
Region	Seats	%	Seats	%	Seats	%	Seats	%	Seats	%	Total seats
Seoul	16	44.4	30	45.4	2	3.4	0	0.4	0	4.6	48
Busan	16	49.9	2	34.6	0	4.7	0	0.1	0	9.7	18
Daegu	12	60.3	0	16.6	0	4.5	0	0.7	0	16.5	12
Incheon	6	47.2	6	44.7	0	3.0	0	1.2	0	2.7	12
Gwangju	0	5.2	6	49.4	1	21.5	0	0.1	1	22.9	8
Daejeon	3	35.3	3	36.8	0	4.0	0	22.4	0	0.8	6
Ulsan	6	54.3	0	13.5	0	26.0	0	0.3	0	4.7	6
Sejong	0	13.9	1	47.9	–		0	33.8	0	4.4	1
Gyeonggi	21	46.1	29	43.6	2	4.3	0	0.1	0	4.8	52
Gangwon	9	52.8	0	37.2	0	1.0	0	0.4	0	8.1	9
North Chungcheong	5	50.1	3	38.0	0	3.8	0	3.6	0	4.1	8
South Chungcheong	4	36.5	3	32.7	0	2.1	3	27.4	0	0.8	10
North Jeolla	0	7.6	9	51.8	1	10.8	0	0.5	1	28.6	11
South Jeolla	0	3.5	10	56.7	1	17.5	–		0	22.0	11
North Gyeongsang	15	60.4	0	8.7	0	5.6	0	0.0	0	23.2	15
South Gyeongsang	14	51.5	1	18.4	0	10.5	0	0.1	1	16.7	16
Jeju	0	25.7	3	48.9	–		0	5.0	0	17.0	3
Total	127	43.3	106	37.9	7	6.0	3	2.2	3	9.4	246

Party list vote results by city/provinces
Region	Saenuri	DUP	UPP	LFP	Other
Seoul	42.3	38.2	10.6	2.1	6.9
Busan	51.3	31.8	8.4	1.9	6.6
Daegu	66.5	16.4	7.0	2.0	8.1
Incheon	42.9	37.7	9.7	2.6	7.1
Gwangju	5.5	68.9	18.6	1.0	5.9
Daejeon	34.3	33.7	9.0	17.9	5.1
Ulsan	49.5	25.2	16.3	1.6	7.4
Sejong	27.8	38.7	5.4	22.6	5.5
Gyeonggi	42.4	27.7	11.0	2.2	6.7
Gangwon	51.3	33.5	6.6	1.8	6.8
North Chungcheong	43.8	36.0	7.7	5.3	7.1
South Chungcheong	36.6	30.4	6.8	20.4	5.8
North Jeolla	9.6	65.6	14.2	1.4	9.2
South Jeolla	6.3	69.6	14.8	1.2	8.2
North Gyeongsang	69.0	13.4	6.2	1.4	9.9
South Gyeongsang	53.8	25.6	10.5	1.6	8.5
Jeju	38.5	39.5	12.4	2.0	7.6
Overall total	42.8	36.5	10.3	3.2	7.2
Seat allocation	25	21	6	2	0

== Reactions and aftermath ==
President Lee said that the "people made wise choices. The government will do its best to manage state affairs in a stable manner and take care of the people's livelihood". The DUP's secretary-general Park Sun-sook conceded the election and added: "The DUP failed to turn public calls for punishing the ... ruling party into reality. We apologise for disappointing supporters. We will sincerely think over what today's election means and try ceaselessly to be reborn as a party the people can lean and rely on." Sim Dae-pyung, leader of the Liberty Forward Party, announced his resignation after the party's poor performance.

On 13 April, the DUP leader Han Myeong-sook announced her resignation on account of her party's defeat.

== See also ==
- List of members of the National Assembly (South Korea), 2012–2016

== Notes ==
1. Comparison includes the Pro-Park Coalition, which split from and subsequently reintegrated with the Grand National Party.
2. This survey asked separate questions on party support and voting intention. The latter result is reported here.
3. This survey dealt specifically with seats allocated by proportional representation.
