= Choi Jae-cheon =

South Korean politician

Choi Jae-cheon (Korean: 최재천; born November 19, 1963) is an attorney and a politician in South Korea. He was elected a member of the National Assembly from Seongdong A, Seoul in 2004 and was a member of the Democratic Party (Uridang) from 2004 to 2008.

== Career ==
After graduating in law at Chonnam National University in February 1986, he passed the 29th judicial examination in 1987 and completed the whole course of the Judicial Research and Training Institute in February 1990. He then served as a military judicial officer from 1990 to 1993. He obtained a master's degree in law at the Chonnam National University in February 1993 and a Ph.D. from the same university in February 2000.

He opened a law office at Seoul in March 1993, and founded the Han-gang Law Corporation in March 2003. After he was elected as the 17th lawmaker of Uri-party (in 2004, he served as a member of the Legislation and Judiciary Committee, the Intelligence Committee, the Foreign affairs, Trade & Unification Committee, and the Food, Agriculture, Forestry & Fisheries Committee. He also worked as a spokesman of a presidential candidate of the Democratic Party from October to December 2007.

Currently he is a representative of the Heritage Law Firm.

== Election results ==
Year	Elections	Constituency	Political party	Votes (%)	Results
2004	17th National Assembly General Election	Seongdong A (Seoul)	Uri	35,617 (40.88%)	Won
2008	18th National Assembly General Election	Seongdong A (Seoul)	UDP	28,794 (44.17%)	Defeated (2nd)
2012	19th National Assembly General Election	Seongdong A (Seoul)	DUP	37,656 (52.08%)	Won

National Assembly of the Republic of Korea
Preceded by Im Jong-seok (Seongdong, Seoul)	Member of the National Assembly for Seongdong A (Seoul); 30 May 2004–29 May 2008	Succeeded by Chin Soo-hee
Preceded by Chin Soo-hee	Member of the National Assembly for Seongdong A (Seoul); 30 May 2012–29 May 2016	Succeeded by Hong Ihk-pyo (Jung–Seongdong A, Seoul); Ji Sang-wook (Jung–Seongdong B, Seoul)
