= Han Wha-jin =

South Korean Minister of Environment

20th Minister of Environment
- In office 11 May 2022 – 24 July 2024
- President: Yoon Suk-Yeol
- Deputy: Lim Sang-jun
- Preceded by: Han Jeoung-ae
- Succeeded by: Kim Wan-sup

Personal details
- Born: December 23, 1959 (age 66) Daejeon, South Korea
- Education: Korea University (BA, MA) University of California, Los Angeles (PhD)

Han Wha-jin (Korean: 한화진; born 1959) is a South Korean researcher and politician who served as the minister of environment from 2022 to 2024. She was appointed by President Yoon Suk-Yeol. She previously served as an honorary researcher at the Korea Environment Institute, where she specialized in air pollution and climate change.

== Early life and education ==
Han was born December 23, 1959, in Daejeon. Han received her bachelor's and master's degrees in chemistry from Korea University. She later earned her doctorate degree in chemistry from the University of California, Los Angeles.

== Career ==
Han was a founding member of the Korea Environment Institute, where she worked for 23 years. Starting in 2009, Han served as the presidential secretary for environment at the Blue House under President Lee Myung-bak. Later, Han served as a member of the Nuclear Safety and Security Commission and the Green Growth Committee under the Prime Minister's Office. From 2016 to 2019, Han headed the Korea Foundation for Women in Science Engineering and Technology.

=== Minister of Environment ===
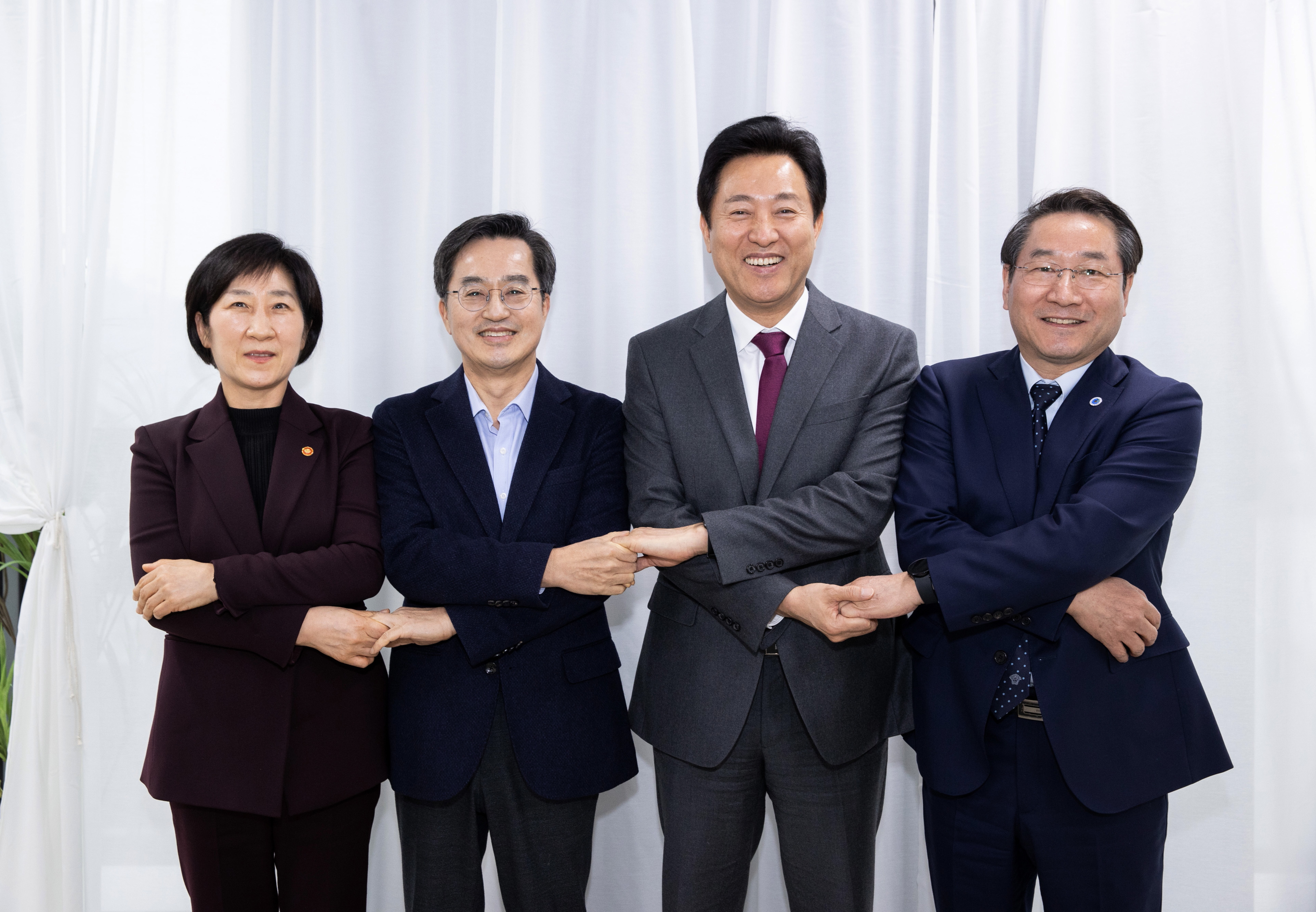
Han after a meeting with Kim Dong-yeon, Oh Se-hoon, and Yoo Jeong-bok

Han was appointed as a candidate for the Minister of Environment by president Yoon Suk-yeol on April 13, 2022. She assumed office on May 11. Han has indicated that she hopes to focus less on regulation and more on autonomy, social cooperation, and opinion gathering. She has also emphasized the importance of advanced technologies such as artificial intelligence (AI), Internet of things (IoT), and big data.

Han has strengthened Yoon's policies of expanding the role of nuclear power. In a 2022 June 15 press conference, she asserted that "the classification of nuclear power as green energy is an international trend," and "how nuclear power and renewable energy will be mixed in harmony" is what matters. (Note: 한화진은 2022년 6월15일 기자간담회에서 "원전이 친환경 녹색에너지로 분류되는 건 국제적 추세"라며 "지난 정부가 재생에너지를 강조하는 차원에서 원전이 밀린 것 같은데 결국 원전과 재생에너지를 어떻게 조화롭게 믹스(mix)하느냐가 중요하다"고 말했다.)

On May 9, 2023, Han announced in a press conference that she will "actively use the four river's weirs" and "diligently execute the cooperative management" of weirs and dams to prepare for droughts and floods. She also claimed that the Moon administration's decisions to remove the weirs "cannot be seen as a decision based on science".
