= Kim Joong-wi =

South Korean politician (1939–2026)

- 김중위

Member of the National Assembly of South Korea
- In office 11 April 1985 – 29 May 2000

Minister of the Environment
- In office 21 December 1994 – 21 December 1995
- Preceded by: Whang San-sung
- Succeeded by: Jeong Jong-taek

Personal details
- Born: 28 October 1939 Bonghwa County, Korea, Empire of Japan
- Died: 18 July 2026 (aged 86)
- Party: DJP; NKP
- Education: Korea University (BA, MA)
- Occupation: Journalist

Kim Joong-wi (Korean: 김중위; 28 October 1939 – 18 July 2026) was a South Korean politician. A member of the Democratic Justice Party and the New Korea Party, he served in the National Assembly from 1985 to 2000 and was Minister of the Environment from 1994 to 1995.

Kim died on 18 July 2026, at the age of 86.
