= Kosha (disambiguation) =

- Kosha a covering
- Kosha Dillz American rapper
- Korea Occupational Safety and Health Agency an organization in Asia
- Jahan Kosha Cannon a weapon
