= List of government agencies of South Korea =

This is a partial list of government agencies of South Korea, under the executive branch.

== Ministries ==
- Ministry of Culture, Sports and Tourism (문화체육관광부, 文化體育觀光部)
- Ministry of Education (교육부, 敎育科學技術部)
- Ministry of Environment (기후에너지환경부, 氣候에너지環境部)
- Ministry of Agriculture, Food and Rural Affairs (농림축산식품부, 農林水産食品部)
- Ministry of Foreign Affairs (외교부, 外交通商部)
- Ministry of Gender Equality and Family (성평등가족부, 性平等家族部)
- Ministry for Health and Welfare (보건복지부, 保健福祉部)
- Ministry of Justice (법무부, 法務部)
- Ministry of Trade and Industry (산업통상부, 産業通商部)
- Ministry of Employment and Labor (고용노동부, 勞動部)
- Ministry of Land, Infrastructure and Transport (국토교통부, 國土海洋部)
- Ministry of National Defense (국방부, 國防部)
- Ministry of Patriots and Veterans Affairs (국가보훈부, 國家報勳部)
- Ministry of the Interior and Safety (행정안전부, 行政安全部)
- Ministry of Economy and Finance (기획재정부, 企劃財政部)
- Ministry of Unification (통일부, 統一部)
- Ministry of SMEs and Startups (중소벤처기업부)
- Ministry of Science and ICT (과학기술정보통신부)

=== Independent agencies ===
- National Security Council(국가안전보장회의)
- Advisory Council on Democratic and Peaceful Unification(민주평화통일자문회의)
- Presidential Council on Science and Technology(국가과학기술자문회의)
- Civil Service Commission(시민사회위원회)
- Korea Independent Commission Against Corruption(고위공직자범죄수사)
- Truth Commission on Suspicious Deaths(진실화해위원회)
- Board of Audit and Inspection(감사원)
- National Intelligence Service(국가정보원)
- Fair Trade Commission(공정거래위원회)
- National Tax Service(국세청)
- Ministry of Data and Statistics(국가데이터처)
- Supreme Public Prosecutors Office(검찰청)
- Military Manpower Administration(병무청)
- National Police Agency(경찰청)
  - National Police Commission(국가경찰위원회)
- Korea Meteorological Administration(기상청)
- Cultural Properties Administration(국가유산청)
- Rural Development Administration(농촌진흥청)
- Korea Forest Service(산림청)
- Ministry of Government Legislation (법제처, 法制處)
- Ministry of Intellectual Property(지식재산처)
- National Maritime Police Agency(해양경찰청)
- Korea Creative Content Agency(한국콘텐츠진흥원)
- Korean Asset Management Company (한국자산관리공사)
- KOTRA (Korea Trade Promotion Corporation)(대한무역투자진흥공사)

== See also ==
- Government of South Korea
