= Kim Wan-sup =

South Korean politician (born 1968)

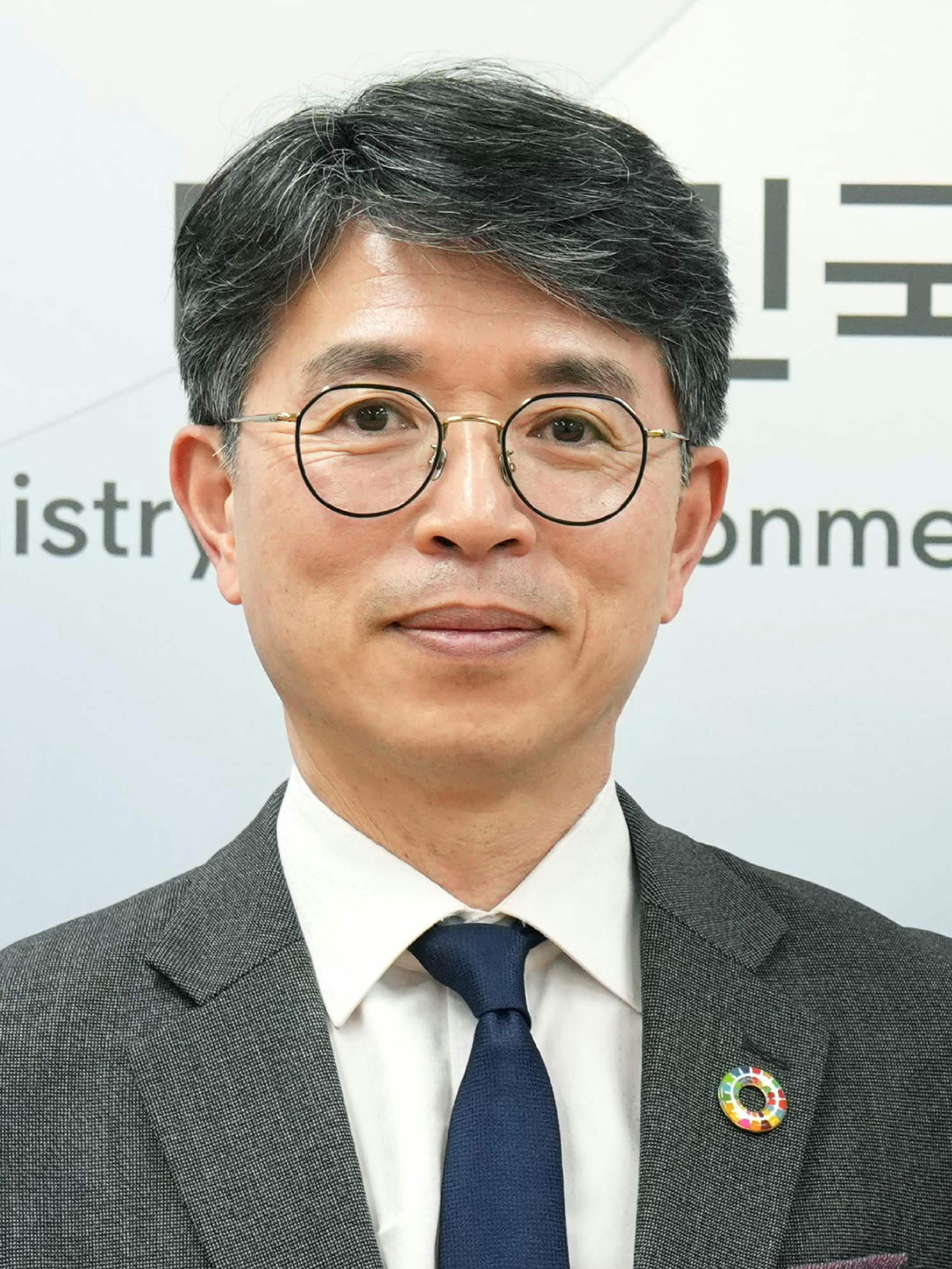
- Kim in 2025

Minister of Environment
- In office July 2024 – July 2025
- President: Yoon Suk-Yeol
- Preceded by: Han Wha-jin
- Succeeded by: Kim Sung-hwan

Vice Minister of Economy and Finance
- In office July 2023 – December 2023

Personal details
- Born: April 19, 1968 (age 58) Wonju, South Korea
- Education: Korea University; Seoul University (MD); University of Missouri (PhD)

Kim Wan-sup (Korean: 김완섭; born April 19, 1968) is a South Korean politician who served as the vice minister of economy and finance in 2023 and as the minister of environment from 2024 to 2025.

== Biography ==
Kim was born on April 19, 1968 in Wonju. He obtained a degree at Korea University, a master's degree from Seoul University, and a Ph.D. in economics from the University of Missouri.

From December 2018 to May 2020, Kim became the Chief of Staff to the Deputy Prime Minister and Minister of Strategy and Finance. Kim was appointed to the 20th Presidential Transition Committee in March 2022. From July to December 2023, Kim was the Vice Minister of Economy and Finance. He unsuccessfully ran for the National Assembly in April 2024.

In July 2024, Kim became the Minister of Environment. He replaced Yoon Suk Yeol's original Minister of Environment, Han Wha-jin. Kim gave a speech at the 2024 United Nations Climate Change Conference.
