= Han Myeong-sook =

Prime Minister of South Korea from 2006 to 2007

Her Excellency Han Myeong-sook
- 한명숙
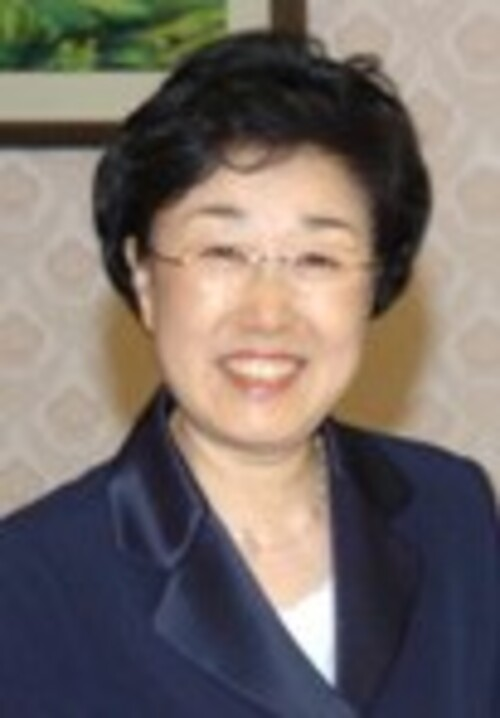
- Han in 2006

Leader of the Democratic United Party
- In office 16 January 2012 – 12 April 2012
- Preceded by: Won Hye-young, Lee Yong-sun (acting)
- Succeeded by: Moon Sung-keun (acting); Park Jie-won (interim); Lee Hae-chan

37th Prime Minister of South Korea
- In office 20 April 2006 – 6 March 2007
- President: Roh Moo-hyun
- Preceded by: Lee Hae-chan; Han Duck-soo (acting)
- Succeeded by: Kwon O-kyu (acting); Han Duck-soo

Minister of Environment
- In office 27 February 2003 – 16 February 2004
- Prime Minister: Goh Kun
- Preceded by: Kim Myung-ja
- Succeeded by: Kwak Kyul-ho

Minister of Gender Equality
- In office 29 January 2001 – 26 February 2003
- Prime Minister: Lee Han-dong; Chang Sang (acting); Jeon Yun-churl (acting); Chang Dae-hwan (acting); Kim Suk-soo
- Preceded by: Position established
- Succeeded by: Ji Eun-hee

Personal details
- Born: 24 March 1944 (age 82) Heijō, Korea, Empire of Japan
- Party: National Congress for New Politics (Before 2000); Millennium Democratic Party (2000–2003); Independent (2003); Uri Party (2003–2007); United New Democratic Party (2007–2008); United Democratic Party (2008); Democratic Party (2008) (2008–2011); Democratic United Party (2011–2013); Democratic Party (2013) (2013–2014); New Politics Alliance for Democracy (2014–2015); Independent (2015–2025); Democratic Party (2015) (2025–present)
- Spouse: Park Seong-jun
- Education: Ewha Womans University
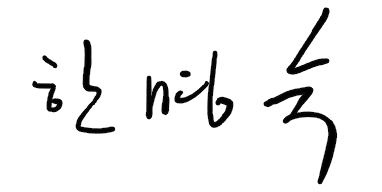
- Signature

Korean name
- Hangul: 한명숙
- Hanja: 韓明淑
- RR: Han Myeongsuk
- MR: Han Myŏngsuk
- Korean royal family (Cheongju Han clan)

Han Myeong-sook (Korean: 한명숙; Korean pronunciation: [han mjʌŋsʰuk]; born 24 March 1944) is a South Korean politician who served as the prime minister of South Korea from 2006 to 2007. A former member of the United New Democratic Party (UNDP), she was South Korea's first female prime minister (second female prime minister overall if the acting premiership of Chang Sang is included).

Born in modern-day Pyongyang, Han graduated from Ewha Womans University in Seoul with a degree in French literature. In 2000, she was elected as a member of the National Assembly for Ilsan-gab. She served as Prime Minister of South Korea under Roh Moo-hyun from 2006 until her resignation on 7 March 2007, to begin her presidential candidacy. After losing her party's nomination, Han ran for a seat in the National Assembly, but was ultimately defeated. However, in January 2012, she was elected leader of the Democratic United Party (DUP) before the April legislative elections, in which they failed to defeat the ruling Saenuri Party. Han stepped down as party leader in April 2012. In August 2015, Han was convicted of receiving illegal donations and sentenced to two years in prison. She was granted special amnesty by the government and her constitutional rights were restored in 2021.

== Pre-Prime Ministerial career ==
She was imprisoned from 1979 to 1981 after she confessed to teaching pro-Communist ideas to workers, farmers and low-income women, but it is now accepted she was imprisoned for pro-Democratic activities. A government committee exonerated her of any wrongdoing in 2001, ruling her confession was elicited through torture.

In 1999, she joined the National Congress for New Politics, and entered politics. In 2000, she was elected as a member of the 16th Korean National Assembly (for Proportional representation). In 2004, she ran for a member of the National Assembly in Ilsan of Goyang and was elected.

Han was the first Minister of Gender Equality, serving from 2001 to 2003. She served as the Minister of Environment from 2003 to 2004.

== Appointment ==
On 24 March 2006, following the resignation of Prime Minister Lee Hae-chan, President Roh Moo-hyun nominated Han to become the first female prime minister of South Korea. Han is only the second woman to be nominated for the prime ministership. On 20 April 2006, Han Myeong-Sook was sworn in, becoming the first female Prime Minister of South Korea.

== Premiership ==
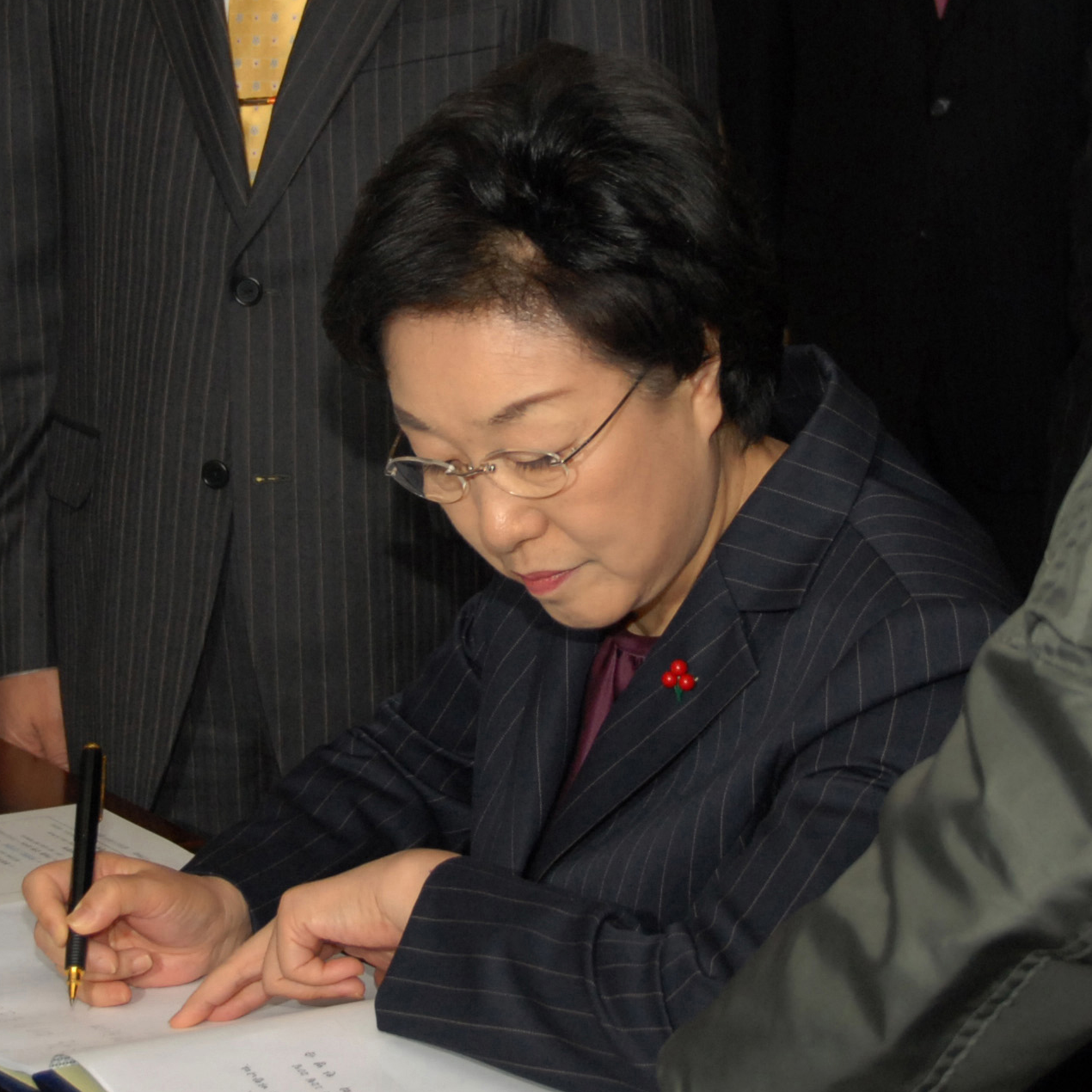
- Premiership of Han Myeong-sook; April 19, 2006 – March 7, 2007
- President: Roh Moo-hyun
- Cabinet: Full list
- Party: Uri
- Seat: Sejong City

=== Libya-South Korea relations ===
Han visited Libya on 19 September 2006 and 20 September 2006.

=== South Korea-United Arab Emirates relations ===
Han went to the United Arab Emirates on 24 September and held high level talks with Prime Minister Mohammed bin Rashid Al Maktoum. Han said she wanted to cultivate "the potential for bilateral cooperation in... trade, investment, IT and tourism." According to Han, "around 50 South Korean companies of global competitiveness have established headquarters of the Middle East region in Dubai." UAE companies invested $8 billion in South Korea from 2002 to 2006, but South Korea total investment in the UAE is only $25 million.

Han was interviewed by Gulf News in September 2006. She expressed a desire to increase South Korean investment in the UAE and sign a Free Trade Agreement with the Gulf Cooperation Council. When asked about gender equality in the UAE, she expressed interest in Muslim women, and commended the fact that the "status of women in Islam is a historic and religious outcome that is regulated by the Quran and Hadith." She pointed to the efforts of Sheikha Fatima bint Mubarak Al Ketbi, the mother of the UAE, the appointment of Sheikha Lubna Khalid Al Qasimi, the first appointment of a female minister, as the Minister of Economy, and the February 2006 appointment of Maryam Mohammed Khalfan Al Roumi as the Minister of Social Affairs as positive signs of the UAE's adapting to social changes. She rejected the idea of "imposing a U.S. or Western-style democracy on the Arab world" saying, "the values of democracy are not to be imposed." Han expressed her friendship towards Lebanon and Israel and her support for UN Security Council Resolution 1701, UNIFIL, United Nations Secretary-General Kofi Annan's efforts at securing peace, and Foreign Minister Ban's candidacy to be the next Secretary General.

=== Kazakhstan-South Korea relations ===
Han met with Daniyal Akhmetov, the Prime Minister of Kazakhstan, on 23 September 2006 in Astana, Kazakhstan. They signed several bilateral agreements enhancing economic ties. The Government of South Korea agreed to invest an additional $2 billion in joint projects in the energy, uranium-extraction, construction, transportation, and banking sectors. Akhmetov offered South Korea the option of participating in developing a new type of nuclear reactor. South Korean investors have stakes in more than 300 Kazakhstan-based companies. Han was in Kazakhstan until 24 September. She then traveled to Uzbekistan.

Han invited President Nazarbayev to visit South Korea in 2007 on behalf of President Roh, and on 25 September, after talking to Nazarbayev, she announced to the press that he had accepted and expressed hope that the trip would help to increase cooperation in the petrochemical industry, information technology and education.

=== South Korea-Uzbekistan relations ===
Han and Shavkat Mirziyoyev, the Prime Minister of Uzbekistan, met in Tashkent, Uzbekistan on 25 September 2006. They signed several agreements, including one deal in which Uzbekistan will send 300 tons of Uzbek uranium ore to South Korea every year from 2010 to 2014. The deal bypasses U.S. companies that acted previously as middlemen for South Korean imports of Uzbek uranium ore. Han also met with President Islam Karimov and parliament speaker Erkin Khalilov. Han and Mirziyoyev boosted cooperation in the energy, agriculture, construction, architecture, and information technology sectors. Trade between South Korea and Uzbekistan increased by nearly 40% between 2005 and 2006, to $565 million.

=== Resignation ===
Han resigned from her position as prime minister on 7 March 2007, amidst speculation that she would run in the December 2007 presidential elections. After the informal meeting with former justice minister Kang Kum-Sil just before her resignation, Han said she would continue as a legislator and think about running for president.

== Post-Prime Ministerial career ==
In 2007, Han ran for the party presidential candidacy but did not succeed in the nominations. She endorsed Chung Dong-young. In 2008, she ran for re-election to parliament, but was defeated by a candidate of Grand National Party. In 2010, she declared to run for Seoul's mayor position, but was very narrowly defeated by Oh Se-hoon of GNP by less than one percentage point.

On the first congress of the Democratic United Party on 15 January 2012, Han was voted chairwoman of the supreme council of the party with 24.5 per cent support rate. The liberal party was created by a merger of the Democratic Party with the minor Citizens Unity Party, and is South Korea's main oppositional force. Han was elected to parliament in the April legislative elections, but the liberals did not manage to oust the ruling party and Han stepped down as DUP head on 16 April 2012. For three months the leaders of the two major Korean parties were women: Park Geun-hye of the Grand National Party and Han Myeong-sook for the DUP.

== Election results ==
=== General elections ===
Year	Elections	Constituency	Political party	Votes (%)	Results
2000	16th National Assembly General Election	Proportional representation (5th)	MDP	6,780,625 (35.87%)	Elected
2004	17th National Assembly General Election	Goyang Ilsan A (Gyeonggi)	Uri	48,286 (49.00%)	Won
2008	18th National Assembly General Election	Goyang Ilsandong (Gyeonggi)	UDP	37,902 (43.83%)	Defeated (2nd)
2012	19th National Assembly General Election	Proportional representation (15th)	DUP	7,777,123 (36.45%)	Elected

=== Local elections ===
==== Mayor of Seoul ====
Year	Elections	Constituency	Political party	Votes (%)	Remarks
2010	5th Iocal Election	Seoul (Mayoral Elections)	Democratic	2,059,715 (46.83%)	Defeated (2nd)

Political offices
New office	Minister of Gender Equality; 29 January 2001–26 February 2003	Succeeded by Ji Eun-hee
Preceded by Kim Myung-ja	Minister of the Environment; 27 February 2003–16 February 2004	Succeeded by Kwak Kyul-ho
Preceded by Lee Hae-chan; Han Duck-soo (Acting)	Prime Minister of South Korea; 20 April 2006–6 March 2007	Succeeded by Kwon O-kyu (Acting); Han Duck-soo
National Assembly of the Republic of Korea
Preceded by	Member of National Assembly from Proportional representation (5th, Millennium Democratic Party); 30 May 2000–29 January 2001	Succeeded by
Preceded by Jeong Beom-gu	Member of National Assembly Goyang Ilsan A (Gyeonggi); 30 May 2004–29 May 2008	Succeeded by Baek Seong-hun (Goyang Ilsan Dong, Gyeonggi)
Preceded by	Member of National Assembly Proportional representation (15th, Democratic United Party); 30 May 2012–20 August 2015	Succeeded by
Party political offices
Preceded by Won Hye-young, Lee Yong-sun (Co-Acting)	Chairman of Democratic United Party; 16 January 2012–16 April 2012	Succeeded by Moon Sung-keun (Acting); Park Jie-won (Interim); Lee Hae-chan
