= National Public Safety Commission =

The National Public Safety Commission is the policy making and oversight body of the national police forces in Japan and South Korea.

- National Public Safety Commission (Japan)
- National Public Safety Commission (South Korea)

== See also ==
- Public safety
