= Han Jeoung-ae =

South Korean politician

- 한정애
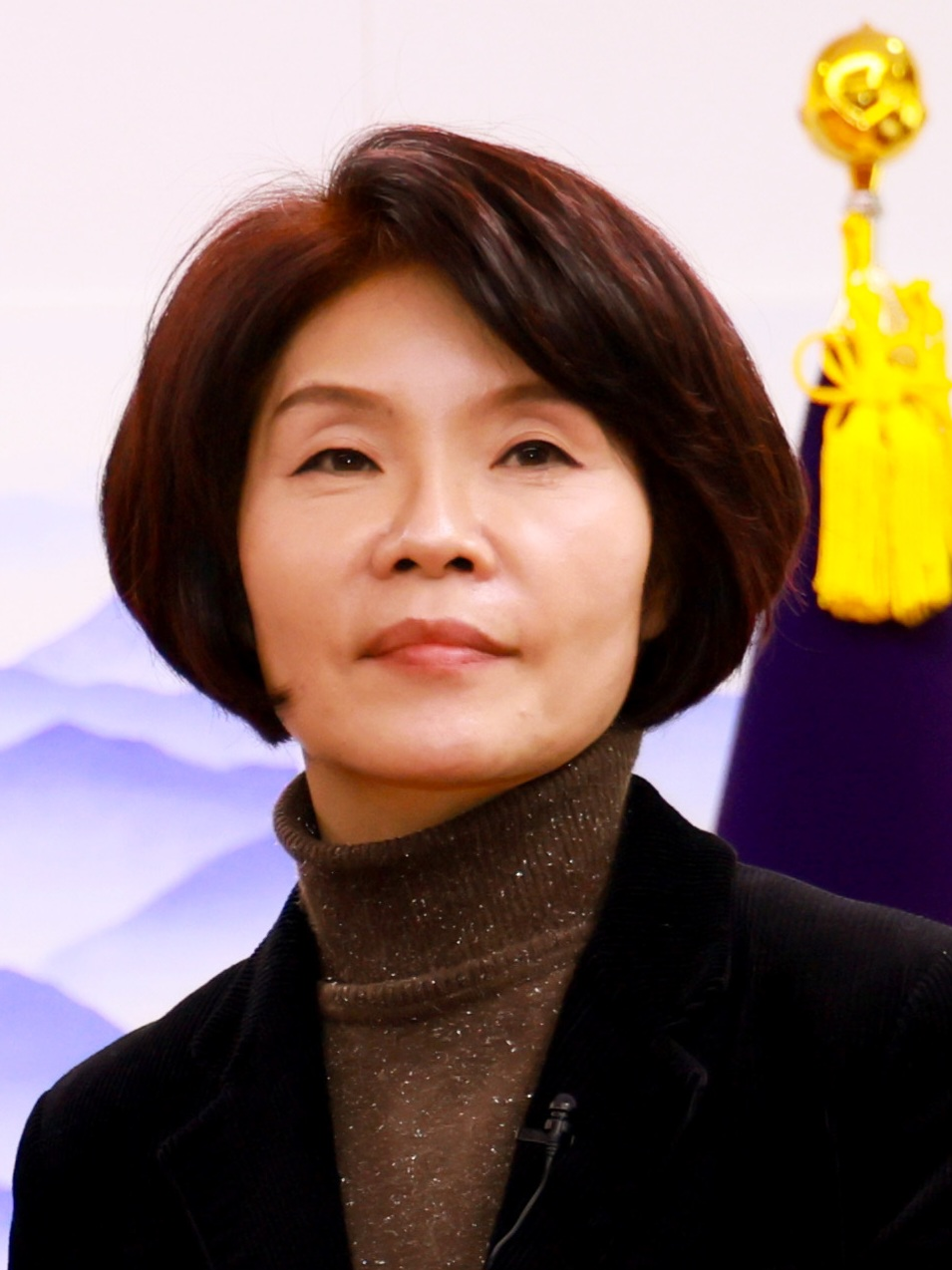
- Han Jeoung-ae

Minister of Environment
- In office 22 January 2021 – 9 May 2022
- President: Moon Jae-in
- Prime Minister: Chung Sye-kyun; Hong Nam-ki (acting); Kim Boo-kyum
- Preceded by: Cho Myung-rae
- Succeeded by: Han Hwa-jin

Secretary-General of the Democratic Party
- Incumbent
- Assumed office 18 August 2026
- Preceded by: Yoo Dong-su

Member of the National Assembly
- Incumbent
- Assumed office 30 May 2016
- Preceded by: Shin Ki-nam (Gangseo A, Seoul); Kim Sung-tae (Gangseo B, Seoul)
- Constituency: Seoul Gangseo C
- In office 30 May 2012 – 29 May 2016
- Constituency: Proportional representation

Personal details
- Born: 8 January 1965 (age 61)
- Party: Democratic
- Education: Busan National University; University of Nottingham
- Religion: Roman Catholic (Christian name : Gabrielle)
- Website: hanjeoungae.com

Han Jeoung-ae (Korean: 한정애; Hanja: 韓貞愛; born 8 January 1965) is a South Korean politician and a three-term parliamentarian representing Gangseo District of Seoul at the National Assembly from 2016. Han also served as Minister of Environment under President Moon Jae-in from 2021 to 2022.

== Trade unionist ==
After graduating from Pusan National University, she worked at Korea Occupational Safety and Health Agency. After completing her doctorate studies in the UK, she returned to the Agency. In 2005 she became the head of its trade union. And in 2006 she became the deputy chair of Federation of Korean Trade Unions's public servants bureau. She continued to take leadership roles in the trade unions before entering politics for the 2012 general election. From 2006 to 2011, she has taken multiple roles in formulating labor-related policy, such as a member of sub-committees of then-Economic and Social Development Commission (now-Economic, Social and Labor Council) and the highest governing bodies of National Pension Service and National Health Insurance Service, as a trade union representative.

== Parliamentarian ==
In the 2012 general election, she was placed as the number 11 of the party's proportional representation list. In the 2016 general election, she defeated the former Gangseo District mayor from the opposition party.

She has taken multiple roles in her party and its preceding parties including one of members its Supreme Council, its deputy floor leader and its spokesperson as well as deputy chair and senior deputy chair of its Policy Planning Committee.

In 2018 she received Lush Prize in lobbying category for her legislative work in supporting alternative safety testing to animal testing.

In 2020 she was elected as the chair of National Assembly's Health and Welfare Committee responsible for scrutinising Ministry of Health and Welfare, Ministry of Food and Drug Safety and related agencies. In August 2020 newly elected leader of her party, Lee Nak-yeon, appointed her as the chair of party's Policy Planning Committee and she subsequently resigned from the elected chair of the Health and Welfare Committee. In September Lee appointed her and Yang Hyang-ja as the co-deputy chair of party's K-New Deal Committee led by party floor leader Kim Tae-nyeon.

== Minister ==
President Moon Jae-in nominated Han as his next Minister of Environment on 30 December 2020. Democratic party leader Lee Nak-yon replaced Han with Hong Ik-pyo to chair the party's policy planning committee.

== Education ==
Han holds two degrees - a bachelor in environmental engineering from Pusan National University and a doctorate in industrial engineering from University of Nottingham. She also completed postgraduate programme in environmental engineering at Pusan National University.

== Electoral history ==
Elections	Year	District	Party affiliation	Votes	Percentage of votes	Results
19th National Assembly General Election	2012	Proportional representation (11st)	Democratic United Party	7,777,123	36.45%	Elected
20th National Assembly General Election	2016	Seoul Gangseo C	Democratic Party	39,992	43.54%	Won
21st National Assembly General Election	2020	Seoul Gangseo C	Democratic Party	64,515	59.92%	Won
22nd National Assembly General Election	2024	Seoul Gangseo C	Democratic Party	62,297	59.13%	Won
