= Hong Ihk-pyo =

South Korean politician

- 홍익표
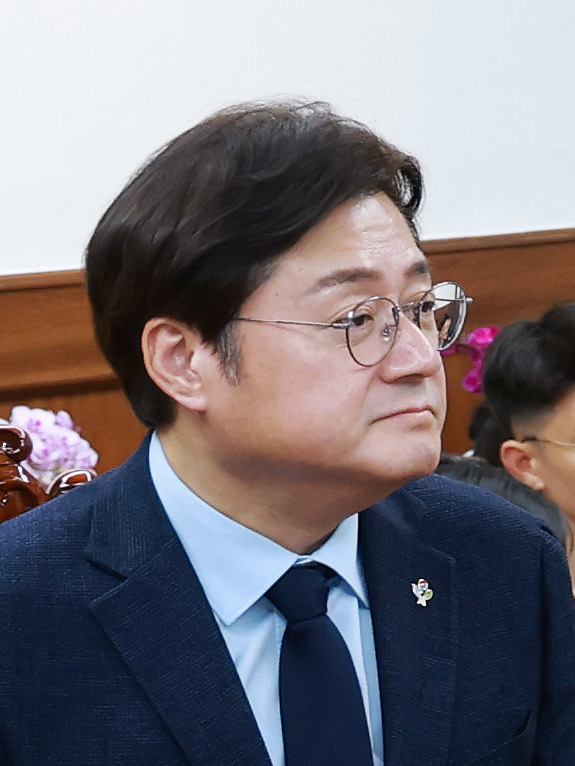
- Hong in 2026

Member of the National Assembly
- In office 30 May 2016 – 29 May 2024
- Preceded by: Choi Jae-cheon (Seongdong A, Seoul); Himself (Seongdong B, Seoul)
- Succeeded by: Jeon Hyun-hee
- Constituency: Seoul Jung–Seongdong A
- In office 30 May 2012 – 29 May 2016
- Preceded by: Kim Dong-seong
- Succeeded by: Himself (Jung–Seongdong A, Seoul); Ji Sang-wook (Jung–Seongdong B, Seoul)
- Constituency: Seoul Seongdong B

13rd Floor Leader of the Democratic Party
- In office 26 September 2023 – 3 May 2024
- Preceded by: Park Kwang-on; Song Gi-heon (acting)
- Succeeded by: Park Chan-dae

Senior Secretary to the President for Political Affairs
- In office 20 January 2026 – 6 November 2026
- President: Lee Jae Myung
- Prime Minister: Kim Min-seok; Han Seong-sook
- Preceded by: Woo Sang-ho
- Succeeded by: Choi In-ho

Personal details
- Born: 20 November 1967 (age 58) South Korea
- Party: Democratic
- Relatives: See Namyang Hong clan
- Education: Hanyang University
- Religion: Roman Catholic (Christian name: Andrew)

- Hong Ihk-pyo
- Hangul: 홍익표
- Hanja: 洪翼杓
- RR: Hong Ikpyo
- MR: Hong Ikp'yo

Hong Ihk-pyo (Korean: 홍익표; born 20 November 1967) is a South Korean academic and politician in the liberal Democratic Party (2015). Since 2012 he has been Member of the National Assembly for Seongdong, Seoul. He is considered a member of the party's pro–Roh Moo-hyun faction.

Hong attracted attention in July 2013 as a spokesman for the Minjoo Party's predecessor, the Democratic Party (2013), when he described President Park Geun-hye as a gwitae (귀태; 鬼胎), literally a "baby born to a ghost or demon or the Devil" or "ghost fetus or demon fetus", an uncommon term that has been applied in an abstract sense to Japanese militarism. A presidential spokesman stated that the label was "verbal abuse and a slur" and questioned Hong's "qualification as a lawmaker". Hong was forced to resign as party spokesman following the remark.

Before becoming a National Assembly member, Hong was a professor at the University of North Korean Studies. He previously worked as an advisor in the Korea Institute for International Economic Policy, and later in the Economic Research Institute for Northeast Asia from 2005 to 2006 in Japan and as senior policy advisor in the Ministry of Unification from 2007 to 2008.

== Works ==
- 1998: (with Cho Myung-chul) North Korea's Investment Environment and Policy for Inducing Investment. Seoul: Korea Institute for International Economic Policy.
- 2000: (with Cho Myung-chul) 中國ㆍ베트남의初期改革ㆍ開放政策과北韓의改革方向 [China and Vietnam's Early Reforms and Opening-up Policies and North Korea's Reform Direction] (in Korean). Seoul: Korea Institute for International Economic Policy.
- 2002: "A Shift Toward Capitalism? Recent Economic Reforms in North Korea". East Asia Review. 14 (4): 93–106.
- 2011: (with others) 북한 의 대외 경제 10년 평가: 2001-10년 [North Korea's International Economic Relations, 2001–2010] (in Korean). Seoul: Korea Institute for International Economic Policy.
- 2014: 한반도를 넘어 유라시아로: 홍익표의 한반도 미래전략 제안 [Beyond the Korean Peninsula to Eurasia: Hong Ihk-pyo's Future Strategy Proposals for the Korean Peninsula] (in Korean). Seoul: I&R.

== Electoral history ==
Election	Year	District	Party affiliation	Votes	Percentage of votes	Results
19th National Assembly General Election	2012	Seoul Seongdong B	Democratic United Party	31,564	49.66%	Won
20th National Assembly General Election	2016	Seoul Jung–Seongdong A	Democratic Party	50,630	45.07%	Won
21st National Assembly General Election	2020	Seoul Jung–Seongdong A	Democratic Party	70,387	54.25%	Won
22nd National Assembly General Election	2024	Seoul Seocho B	Democratic Party	57,404	42.50%	Defeated (2nd)

National Assembly of the Republic of Korea
Preceded by Kim Dong-seong	Member of the National Assembly for Seongdong B (Seoul); 30 May 2012–29 May 2016	Succeeded by Himself (Jung–Seongdong A, Seoul); Ji Sang-wook (Jung–Seongdong B, Seoul)
Preceded by Choi Jae-cheon (Seongdong A, Seoul); Himself (Seongdong B, Seoul)	Member of the National Assembly for Jung–Seongdong A (Seoul); 30 May 2016–29 May 2024	Succeeded by Jeon Hyun-hee
Political offices
Preceded by Woo Sang-ho	Senior Secretary to the President for Political Affairs; 20 January 2026–6 November 2026	Succeeded by Choi In-ho
Party political offices
Preceded by Park Kwang-on; Song Gi-heon (Acting)	Floor Leader of the Democratic Party; 26 September 2023–3 May 2024	Succeeded by Park Chan-dae
