= Kim Myung-ja (politician) =

South Korean politician and scientist (born 1944)

- 김명자

Minister of Environment
- In office 27 June 1999 – 27 February 2003
- President: Kim Dae-jung
- Prime Minister: Kim Jong-pil; Park Tae-joon; Lee Han-dong; Kim Suk-soo
- Preceded by: Son Sook
- Succeeded by: Han Myeong-sook

Member of the National Assembly
- In office 30 May 2004 – 29 May 2008
- Constituency: Proportional representation

Personal details
- Born: 13 July 1944 (age 82) Keijō, Korea, Empire of Japan
- Education: Seoul National University; University of Virginia

Korean name
- Hangul: 김명자
- Hanja: 金明子
- RR: Gim Myeongja
- MR: Kim Myŏngja

Kim Myung-ja (Korean: 김명자; born 13 July 1944) is a South Korean scientist, educator and politician previously served as the longest serving minister of Kim Dae-jung administration and female minister in South Korean history respectively.

Kim has been very active in participating in policy making process and taking advisory roles across public and private sectors, academia and civil societies.

Before joining the cabinet of President Kim Dae-jung, Kim took numerous advisory roles in the central government through presidential advisory councils, such as National Unification Advisory Council and Presidential Advisory Council on Education, Science ＆ Technology, as well as committees chaired by prime ministers and ministers from now Ministry of Science and ICT, Ministry of Education and now Ministry of Trade, Industry and Energy.

As Minister of Environment, Kim initiated policies to increase eco-friendly Natural gas buses. Under her leadership, the Ministry topped the first-ever created government agencies evaluation twice in 2001 and 2002.

For the 2004 general election, Kim was placed as the number 3 of the proportional list for liberal, then-ruling party Uri Party. From 2006 to 2008 Kim chaired the ethics committee of the National Assembly. She has participated in advisory committee of successor of Uri Party's opposition party, Saenuri Party.

Kim is the President of the board of the Korean Federation of Science and Technology Societies and has served as the 1st president of the board of Center for Women in Science, Engineering, and Technology from 2014 to 2016, the 6th president of Korea Federation of Women's Science and Technology Association from 2012 to 2013.

Kim is Non-executive director of Hyosung from 2017 and an advisor to GS Caltex from 2013. She was NED of other Chaebol, Doosan Group, from 2009 to 2012.

Kim is a member of an international advisory panel of Asian Infrastructure Investment Bank.

Kim taught at her alma mater - Seoul National University - and Sookmyung Women's University before entering politics and previously was a visiting professor at her alma mater and KAIST as well as an endowed-chair professor at Myongji University.

Kim holds three degrees in chemistry - a bachelor from Seoul National University and a master's and a doctorate from University of Virginia.

== Electoral history ==
Election	Year	District	Party affiliation	Votes	Percentage of votes	Results
17th National Assembly General Election	2004	Proportional representation	Uri Party	8,145,824	38.26%	Won

== Awards ==
- Order of Science and Technological Merit by the government of South Korea (2015)
- Order of Service Merit by the government of South Korea (2004)
- 1st "Scientist to Become" Award by now Ministry of Science and ICT (2002)
- now-Korea Best Scientist Award (then Presidential Award for the Advancement of Science and Technology) by the government of South Korea (1994)
