= Jung–Seongdong A =

Constituency in Seoul, South Korea

- Single-member constituency for the National Assembly
- Location of the constituency
- District(s): Seongdong District (part)
- Region: Seoul
- Electorate: 180,528 (2024)

Current constituency
- Created: 2016
- Seats: 1
- Party: Democratic Party
- Member of Parliament: Jeon Hyun-hee
- Council constituency: Seongdong 2nd district Seongdong 3rd district Seongdong 4th district
- Created from: Seongdong A (part); Seongdong B

Jung–Seongdong A (Korean: 중구·성동구 갑) is a constituency of the National Assembly of South Korea. The constituency consists of part of Seongdong District, Seoul. As of 2024, 180,528 eligible voters were registered in the constituency.

== List of members of the National Assembly ==
Election	Member	Party	Dates	Notes
2016	Hong Ihk-pyo	Democratic	2016–2024	Assembly spokesperson of the Democratic Party (2013); Floor leader of the Democratic Party (2023–2024); Senior Secretary for Political Affairs (2026–)
2020	Hong Ihk-pyo	Democratic	2016–2024	Assembly spokesperson of the Democratic Party (2013); Floor leader of the Democratic Party (2023–2024); Senior Secretary for Political Affairs (2026–)
2024	Jeon Hyun-hee	Democratic	2024–present	Chairperson of the Anti-Corruption and Civil Rights Commission (2020–2023)

== Election results ==
=== 2024 ===
Legislative Election 2024: Jung–Seongdong A
Party	Candidate	Votes	%	±%
Democratic	Jeon Hyun-hee	65,204	52.61	▼1.64
People Power	Yun Hee-suk	58,726	47.38	▲6.45
Rejected ballots		1,765	–	
Turnout		123,930	69.6	▲1.33
Registered electors		180,528		
Democratic hold		Swing		

=== 2020 ===
Legislative Election 2020: Jung–Seongdong A
Party	Candidate	Votes	%	±%
Democratic	Hong Ihk-pyo	70,387	54.3	+9.2
United Future	Jin Soo-hee	53,107	41.0	+1.6
Justice	Jeong Hye-yeon	5,465	4.2	+2.1
National Revolutionary Dividends	Lee Jeong-seop	786	0.6	new
Rejected ballots		1,455	–	–
Turnout		131,200	68.3	–
Registered electors		192,161		
Democratic hold				

=== 2016 ===
Legislative Election 2016: Jung–Seongdong A
Party	Candidate	Votes	%	±%
Democratic	Hong Ihk-pyo	50,630	45.1	new
Saenuri	Kim Dong-sung	44,253	39.4	new
People's	Seo Kyung-sun	15,059	13.4	new
Justice	Jang Ji-woong	2,379	2.1	new
Rejected ballots		1,100	–	–
Turnout		113,421	59.8	–
Registered electors		189,620		
Democratic win (new seat)				

== See also ==
- List of constituencies of the National Assembly of South Korea
