= Pak Un-jong =

South Korean ethicist (born 1952)

- 박은정
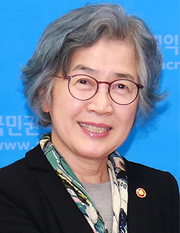

Chairperson of Anti-Corruption and Civil Rights Commission
- In office 29 June 2017 – 26 June 2020
- President: Moon Jae-in
- Prime Minister: Lee Nak-yeon; Chung Sye-kyun
- Preceded by: Sung Yung-hoon
- Succeeded by: Jeon Hyun-hee

Personal details
- Born: 3 October 1952 (age 74) Andong, South Korea
- Education: Ewha Womans University (LLB); University of Freiburg (J.D.)

Pak Un-jong or Park Un-jong (Korean: 박은정; Hanja: 朴恩正; born 2 October 1952) is a South Korean bioethics expert previously served as President Moon Jae-in's first chairperson of Anti-Corruption and Civil Rights Commission. She is the sixth person and second woman to lead the Commission ever since it was created in 2008.

Pak has developed her career as an expert in law and bioethics.

She taught at College of Law of Ewha Womans University for over two decades as an assistant professor from 1980, an associate professor from 1985 and a professor from 1990. In 2004 she became the first non-Seoul National University-graduate to become a law professor at the SNU law school which she assumed till 2018. From 1998 to 2002 she served as the 7th president of Korean Association of Legal Philosophy. From 1999 to 2001 she was a member of Administrative Appeals Commission. From 2010 she is leading Asian Women Law Society and its research Institute.

Pak was a member of International Bioethics Committee of UNESCO from 1998 to 2004 and Council for Comprehensive Biotechnology Policy of now-Ministry of Science and ICT, which is established by Biotechnology Support Act, from 2000 to 2004. In 2002 she was elected as the vice chair of Korean Association of Institutional Review Boards. From 2002 to 2007 she chaired Ethics Committee of Stem Cell Research Center for Drug Development of Korea. She was vice chair of Asian Bioethics Association from 2004 to 2008 and National Bioethics Committee of Korea from 2008 to 2011.

She graduated from Ewha Womans University in 1974 and University of Freiburg in 1978 with Bachelor and Doctoral degree in law respectively.

== Awards ==
- 46th National Academy of Sciences Award Humanities and Social Sciences division by National Academy of Sciences of South Korea (2001)
- Order of Service Merit by the government of South Korea (2002)
