= Kim Jong-hoon (politician, born 1952) =

South Korean politician

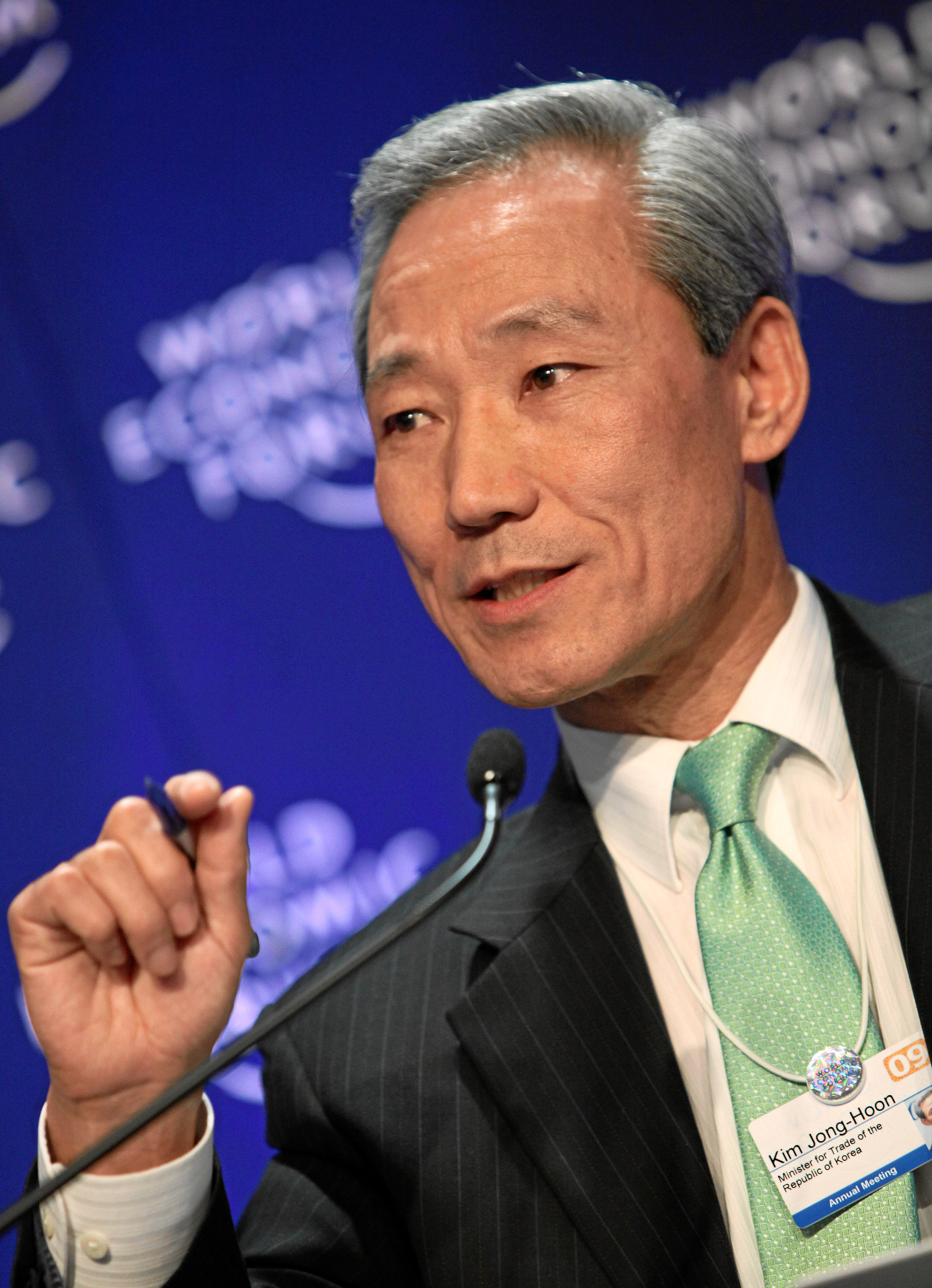
Kim Jong-Hoon at the World Economic Forum Annual Meeting in Davos, in 2009.

Kim Jong-hoon (Korean: 김종훈; Hanja: 金宗壎, born 5 May 1952) is a South Korean diplomat and politician who served as a parliamentarian and Director of the Ministry of Foreign Affairs and Trade. He played a major role in the South Korea–United States Free Trade Agreement.

== Biography ==
Born in Daegu, he entered the Ministry of Foreign Affairs in 1974. He worked for Korean embassies in France, Upper Volta (now Burkina Faso), Canada, and the United States. He then served as the Korean representative to international organizations in Geneva, such as the WTO.

During the presidency of Roh Moo-hyun, he began working on FTA negotiations between South Korea and the United States. Partly due to his efforts, the negotiations came through, forming the South Korea-United States Free Trade Agreement. After the negotiations, he served as chairman of UNESCAP in 2008 and 2010.

In 2012, he won a parliamentary race in the Seoul Gangnam B district as a member of the conservative Saenuri Party. He served on several party committees during his four-year term. He lost re-election to his seat in 2016, being defeated by Jeon Hyun-hee of the Democratic Party.

== Election results ==
Year	Elections	Constituency	Political party	Votes (%)	Results
2012	19th National Assembly General Election	Gangnam B (Seoul)	Saenuri	73,346 (59.48%)	Won
2016	20th National Assembly General Election	Gangnam B (Seoul)	Saenuri	41,757 (44.41%)	Defeated (2nd)
