= Park Sung-joon (politician) =

South Korean politician

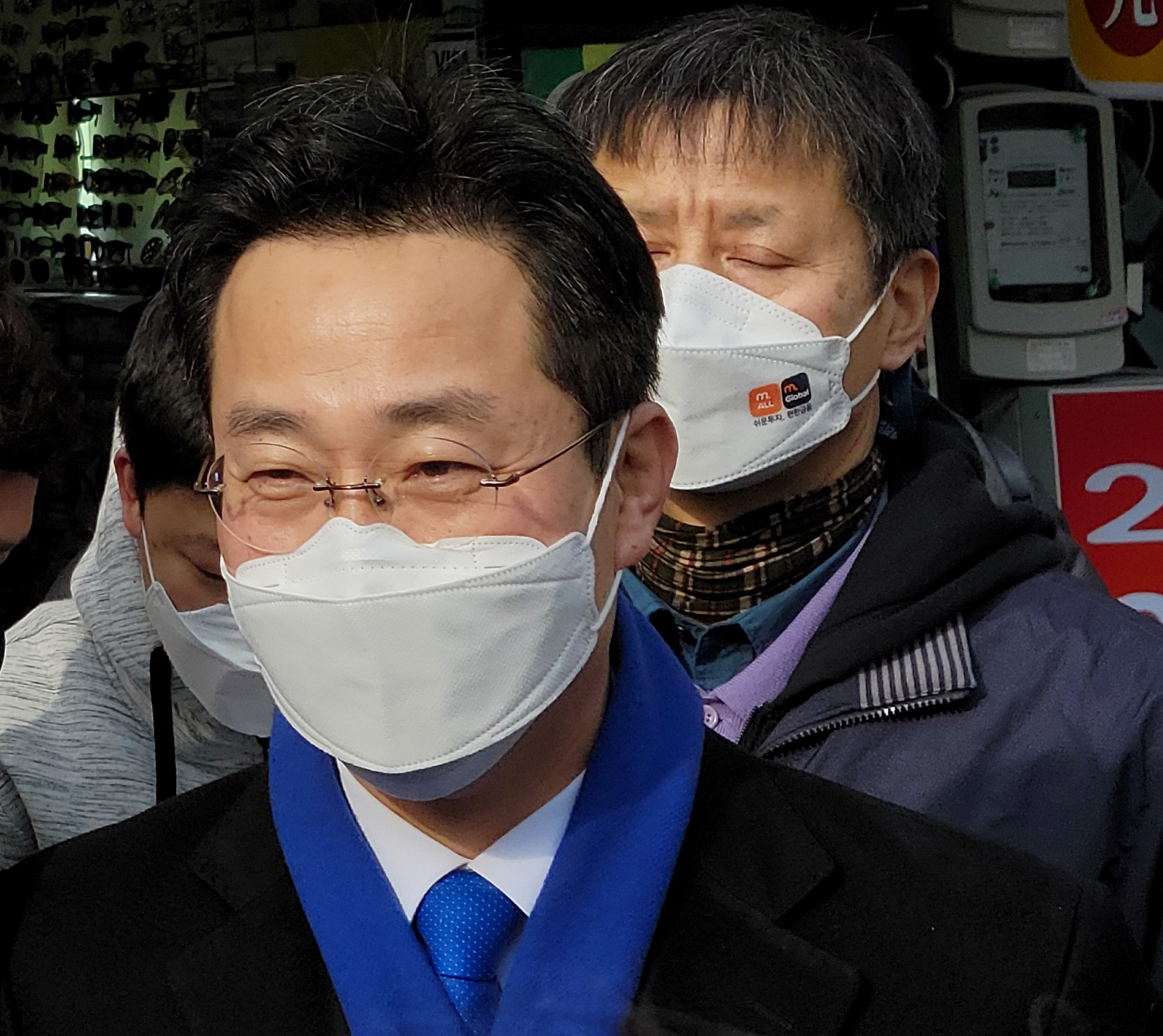

Member of the National Assembly of South Korea
- Incumbent
- Assumed office 30 May 2020
- Preceded by: Ji Sang-wook
- Constituency: Seoul Jung–Seongdong B

Personal details
- Born: 23 April 1969 (age 57)
- Party: Democratic Party

Park Seong-jun, alternatively spelled Park Sung-joon (born 23 April 1969), is a South Korean politician from the Democratic Party. He represents Jung–Seongdong B district in the National Assembly of South Korea since 2020.

Before politics, he worked as a television presenter for the Korean Broadcasting System.

== Election results ==
Year	Elections	Constituency	Political party	Votes (%)	Results
2020	21st National Assembly General Election	Jung–Seongdong B (Seoul)	Democratic	64,071 (51.96%)	Won
2024	22nd National Assembly General Election	Jung–Seongdong B (Seoul)	Democratic	61,728 (50.81%)	Won

== See also ==
- List of members of the National Assembly (South Korea), 2020–2024
- List of members of the National Assembly (South Korea), 2024–2028
