= Choi Jae-uk =

South Korean politician (1940–2024)

- 최재욱

Minister of Environment
- In office 3 March 1998 – 24 May 1999
- Preceded by: Yun Yeo-Jun
- Succeeded by: Son Sook

Member of the National Assembly of South Korea
- In office 30 May 1988 – 29 May 1996
- Preceded by: constituency established
- Succeeded by: Lee Hae-bong
- Constituency: proportional representation (1988–1992); Dalseo B (1992–1996)

Personal details
- Born: 1 October 1940 Goryeong County, Korea, Empire of Japan
- Died: 17 November 2024 (aged 84)
- Party: DJP; DLP
- Education: Yeungnam University
- Occupation: Reporter

Choi Jae-uk (Korean: 최재욱; 1 October 1940 – 17 November 2024) was a South Korean reporter and politician. A member of the Democratic Justice Party and later the Democratic Liberal Party, he served in the National Assembly from 1988 to 1996 and was Minister of Environment from 1998 to 1999.

Choi died on 17 November 2024, at the age of 84.
