= Jeon Hyun-hee =

South Korean dentist, lawyer, and politician

- 전현희
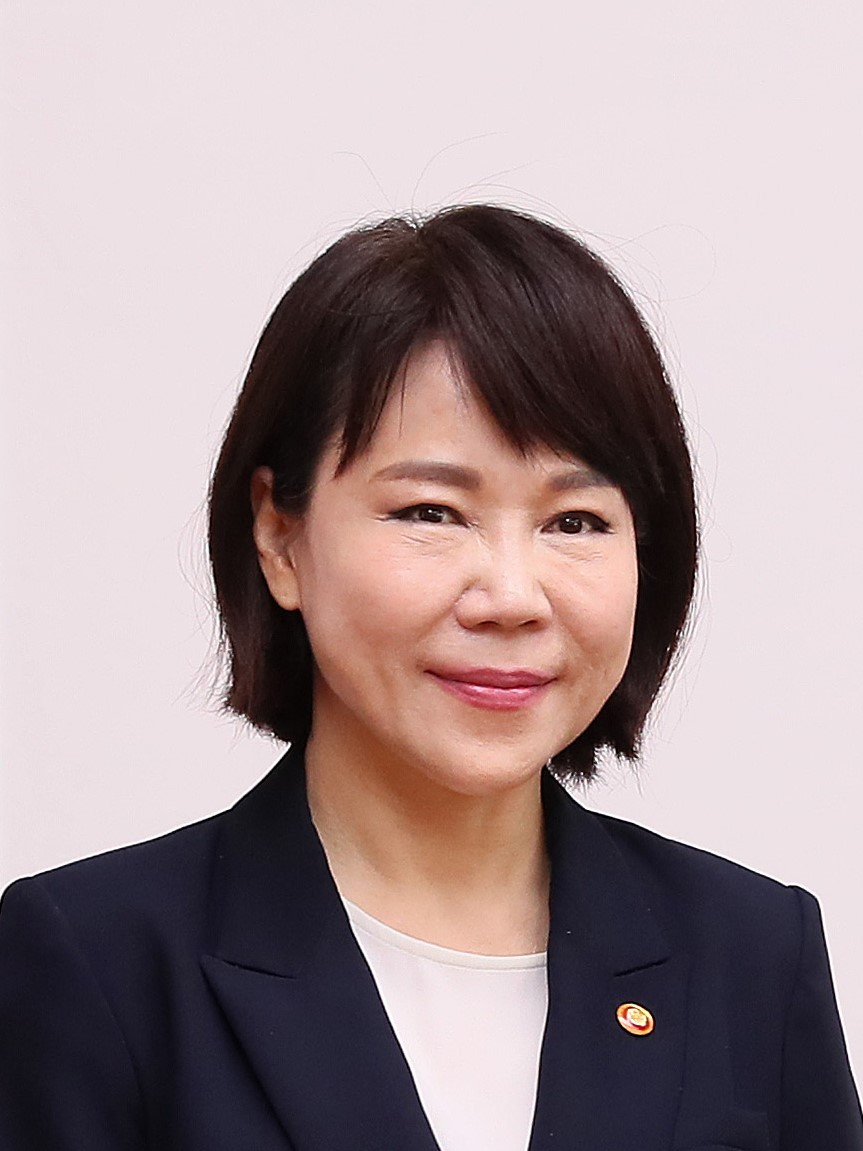

Chairperson of Anti-Corruption and Civil Rights Commission
- In office 29 June 2020 – 27 June 2023
- President: Moon Jae-in; Yoon Suk Yeol
- Prime Minister: Chung Sye-kyun; Hong Nam-ki (acting); Kim Boo-kyum; Choo Kyung-ho (acting); Han Duck-soo
- Preceded by: Pak Un-jong
- Succeeded by: Kim Hong-il

Member of the National Assembly
- In office 30 May 2008 – 29 May 2012
- Constituency: Proportional representation
- In office 30 May 2016 – 29 May 2020
- Preceded by: Kim Jong-hoon
- Succeeded by: Park Jin
- Constituency: Seoul Gangnam B
- Incumbent
- Assumed office 30 May 2024
- Preceded by: Hong Ihk-pyo
- Constituency: Seoul Jung–Seongdong A

Personal details
- Born: 4 November 1964 (age 62) Tongyeong, South Korea
- Party: Democratic (2015)
- Other political affiliations: Grand Unified Democratic New Party (2008); United Democratic Party (2008); Democratic (2008) (2008–2011); United Democratic Party (2011–2013); Democratic Party (2013) (2013–2014); New Politics Alliance for Democracy (2014–2015); Democratic (2015) (2015–2020); Independent (2020–2023)
- Education: Seoul National University; Korea University

Jeon Hyun-hee (Korean: 전현희; Hanja: 全賢姬; born 4 November 1964) is a South Korean dentist-turned lawyer and politician currently who served as the Chairperson of Anti-Corruption and Civil Rights Commission under President Moon Jae-in from June 2020 until June 2023. She also previously served as a two-term parliamentarian.

== Early life and career ==
After graduating from dentistry school she worked as a dentist. In 1996 she became the first dentist to ever pass the state bar exam. In the early 2000s she persuaded the people infected with AIDS from Haemophilia medicine and their families and began the pro bono lawsuit against the pharmaceutical companies. In 2011 the Supreme Court ruled in favour of victims.

In the 2008 general election, Jeon was placed as the number 7 on the proportional list for democratic party. For the 2012 general election, she applied to become the party's candidate for Seoul Gangnam B constituency. After losing party nomination for the constituency to Chung Dong-young, her party's candidate in the previous presidential election, she was given other constituency but rejected the offer. In 2016 she was the first to win party's nomination among the candidates for Seoul's constituencies. In the 2016 general election she defeated the incumbent Kim Jong-hoon becoming the first liberal parliamentarian to represent Gangnam District in two decades.

Jeon is best to known to the public through her work as the head of Carpool-Taxi TF of her party's Policy Planning Committee. After visiting representatives of taxi industry for over 200 times, she successfully mediated two sides to reach an agreement.

A month after losing her re-election in 2020, Jeon was appointed by President Moon as the chair of Anti-Corruption and Civil Rights Commission. She has called for proactive public administration in fulfilling its mandate of fighting against corruption and securing citizens' civil rights.

Jeon holds two degrees - a DDS from Seoul National University and a master's in law from Korea University.

== Electoral history ==
Election	Year	District	Party affiliation	Votes	Percentage of votes	Results
18th National Assembly General Election	2008	Proportional Representation (7th)	United Democratic Party	4,313,645	25.17%	Elected
20th National Assembly General Election	2016	Seoul Gangnam B	Democratic Party	48,381	51.46%	Won
21st National Assembly General Election	2020	Seoul Gangnam B	Democratic Party	47,157	46.41%	Lost (2nd)
22nd National Assembly General Election	2024	Seoul Jung–Seongdong A	Democratic Party	65,204	52.61%	Won
