= Korea Independent Commission Against Corruption =

- Hangul: 국가청렴위원회
- Hanja: 國家淸廉委員會
- RR: Gukga cheongnyeom wiwonhoe
- MR: Kukka ch'ŏngnyŏm wiwŏnhoe

The Korea Independent Commission Against Corruption is an independent commission that reports to the president in its fight against corruption and the consequent promotion of the clean administration of South Korea.

The Korea Independent Commission Against Corruption (KICAC) was established on 25 January 2002, under the Anti-Corruption Act of Korea, which was enacted by the Korean National Assembly on 24 July 2001, which sought to prevent corruption and promote transparency in Korean society.

In a coordinated effort with other monitoring agencies, also known proverbially as watchdogs, the KICAC is involved in producing policies, orchestrating preventive activities such as institutional improvement and educational programs, works to detect corruption by investigative processes and receiving complaints from the public, and also evaluates the anti-corruption activities of other national, and international, organizations.

The KICAC was integrated into a larger agency entitled the Anti-Corruption and Civil Rights Commission (ACRC), which was formally launched on 29 February 2008. This integration involved not only the KICAC, but also the ombudsman of Korea and the Administrative Appeals Commission.

== Organization history ==
Amongst other stimuli, the 1997 Asian financial crisis resulted in the bankruptcy of major Korean companies, provoking not only corporation, but also government officials towards corruption. Korean companies received preferential treatment from the government, resulting in poor financial structure, excessive corporate debt, and an enervated competition between businesses both nationally and abroad.

In the aftermath of the financial crisis, the Korean government realized that it must reanimate its economic competitiveness in the global market. In light of such, the government implemented regulatory reforms, improving the transparency of business, and invested great efforts in anti-corruption legislation and practices.

In February 1998, Kim Dae-jung was inaugurated as the president of South Korea. In the following months, the president-elect directed anti-corruption legislation, particularly the protection of whistleblowers and the establishment of investigative bodies that would exercise searches of government offices. However, this development was stunted by various factors, such as rescinding opinions of government authorities.

During the 16th National Assembly, which was formed in May 2000, civic groups came together to form the Citizens' Coalition for Anti-Corruption Legislation in order to file a petition for the legislation of anti-corruption policies during the National Assembly. The public responded favorably to this audacious move by the civic groups, whose subsequent outcome was the passing of the Anti-Corruption Act (ACA) on 28 June 2001. The ACA was roughly sketched, lacking substantive provisions and measures against corruption. It was through the ACA, however, that KICAC was born.

In spite of the KICAC's debut, corruption in South Korea wasn't pointedly affected, raising feelings of doubt and skepticism about the necessity of an anti-corruption agency. Roh Moo Hyun's presidency, however, prioritized the fight against corruption, which led not only to the evolution of the KICAC but other corruption-resisting bodies as well. This positive move towards anti-corruption led to the creation of the Minister-Level Meeting on Corruption (MLMC) in 2004, the Defense Acquisition Program Administration (DAPA), along with the issuance of such programs such as the Act on the Election of Public Officials and the Prevention of Election Malpractices and the Korean Pact on Anti-Corruption and Transparency (K-PACT).

The KICAC was integrated into the Anti-Corruption and Civil Rights Commission (ACRC) in February 2008 to provide a consolidated service for the public. The ACRC is currently located in the Seodaemoon district of Seoul, South Korea.

== Structure of the KICAC ==
The decision-making body of the KICAC consists of nine commissioners: three commissioners recommended by the national assembly, three by the chief justice of the Supreme Court, and three by the president. These commissioners are in office for three year cycles and may be reappointed for additional terms. They are granted full independence while fulfilling their duties as public figures.

As of February 2007, the KICAC employed 210 public servants.

== Chairmen of the commission ==
- Lee Jong Baek (August 2007 – March 2008)
- Chung Soung-jin (August 2005 – August 2007)
- Lee Nam-joo (March 2003 – August 2004)
- Kang Chul-kyu (January 2002 – March 2003)

== Main functions ==
The KICAC engages in nine major functions:

1. Establishing and coordinating anti-corruption policies
2. Evaluating the levels of integrity and assessing the anti-corruption practices of public-sector organizations
3. Improving the legal and institutional framework
4. Handling reports on allegations of corrupt conduct
5. Offering protection and rewards to whistleblowers
6. Promoting ethics in public services
7. Raising public awareness on the risks of corruption
8. Promoting public and private partnership against corruption
9. Engaging in the global fight against corruption

The KICAC guides the Korean government in the elimination of corruption by ensuring its anti-corruption policies are implemented by the government and its agencies. The KICAC also refers cases of corruption, reported by general citizens and by public officials, to the relevant authorities for further action.

== Recent accomplishments ==
- Corruption Impact Assessment (April 2006): A shift from penalty-based anti-corruption methods to the analysis of the factors that cause corruption. Upon analysis, there can be a more direct and systemic response to corruption. Through this systematic assessment, the KICAC identified 358 corruption-causing factors from 113 government proposals in December 2006. These identified factors.
- KICAC forged alliances with other anti-corruption agencies around the world, such as the Komisi Pemberantasan Korrupsi (KPK), also known as the Corruption Eradication Commission of Indonesia (CEC), in December 2006. Another important cooperative effort established was with the United Nations Development Program, with which KICAC is conducting a two-year program to provide technical support to four Asian-Pacific countries in their respective battles against corruption.
- Amplified democratic systems by acting as a loudspeaker for citizens to speak out against government officials that are suspected of being corrupt. The Citizen Recall Act (May 2006), for instance, allowed voters to oust governors, mayors or local council members who engaged in corrupt practices, negligence of duties, or power abuse.
- Blind Trust System (November 2005): financial accounts of senior officials are put into bank trust accounts, which help them carry out their public duties in a transparent manner by preventing possible financial incentives that may compromise their public service ethic.
- Expansion of the Korean Pact on Anti-Corruption and Transparency (K-PACT) to include endorsements by 10 central government agencies, 18 public corporations, and 11 local government as of December 2006.

== Anti-Corruption and Civil Rights Commission (ACRC) ==
The ACRC has a total of 15 commissioners, which include one minister-level chairman, three vice-chairmen, three standing commissioners, and 8 non-standing commissioners. The ACRC has four departments: the Bureau of the Ombudsman, the Bureau of Anti-Corruption, the Bureau of Administrative Appeals, and the Office of Planning and Coordination, which acts as the secretariat.

The ACRC follows three policy directions:

1. Developing an efficient and integrated system designed to reinforce civil rights
2. Improving the laws and regulations aimed at protecting the population's rights and interests
3. Cultivating a sense of integrity in society

The main functions of the ACRC include:

1. Responding to public complaints against ineffectual public systems
2. Preventing and deterring corruption in the public center
3. Protecting people from illegal and unfair administrative practices through a system of appeals

== See also ==
- Political corruption
- Politics of South Korea
- List of government agencies of South Korea
