= Kim Eun-kyung (politician) =

South Korean politician

- 김은경

Minister of Environment
- In office 4 July 2017 – 9 November 2018
- President: Moon Jae-in
- Prime Minister: Lee Nak-yeon
- Preceded by: Cho Kyeong-gyu
- Succeeded by: Cho Myung-rae

Personal details
- Born: 9 June 1956 (age 70) Seoul, South Korea
- Party: Democratic
- Education: Korea University; University of Seoul

Korean name
- Hangul: 김은경
- Hanja: 金恩京
- RR: Gim Eungyeong
- MR: Kim Ŭn'gyŏng

Kim Eun-kyung (Korean: 김은경; born 9 June 1956) is a South Korean politician who served as President Moon Jae-in's first Minister of Environment. She was later jailed for two years and sixth months for abuse of power during her term as environment minister.

== Career ==
Kim was previously widely known to the public as "Ms. Phenol" due to her activism as a citizen representative during 1991 Nakdong River phenol contamination incident.

She first started public service in 1995 when she was elected as Nowon District Council member. On 1998, she was elected as a Seoul Metropolitan Council member. After losing her re-election in 2002, she joined then-candidate Roh Moo-hyun's presidential campaign as his special advisor on environment. She continued working with Roh at his transition team and Blue House until the end of his presidency in 2006.

Kim served as the environment minister from July 2017 to November 2018. In January 2018, the Environment Ministry created a blacklist of 24 public servants associated with the previous Park Geun-hye administration. Kim pressured 15 executives of state-run companies to step down and be replaced by loyalists to the Moon administration. 13 of 24 individuals on the list resigned due to government pressure.

On February 9, 2021, the Seoul Central District Court sentenced Kim Eun-kyung to 2 years and six months of prison for the environment ministry blacklist case. The court also ordered her to be immediately jailed to prevent the possible destruction of evidence.

== Education ==
She holds three degrees - a bachelor and doctorate in management from Korea University and a master's in urban administration from University of Seoul.

== Awards ==
- Order of Service Merit by the government of South Korea (2005)
