= National Tax Service (South Korea) =

Tax organization of South Korea

- 국세청
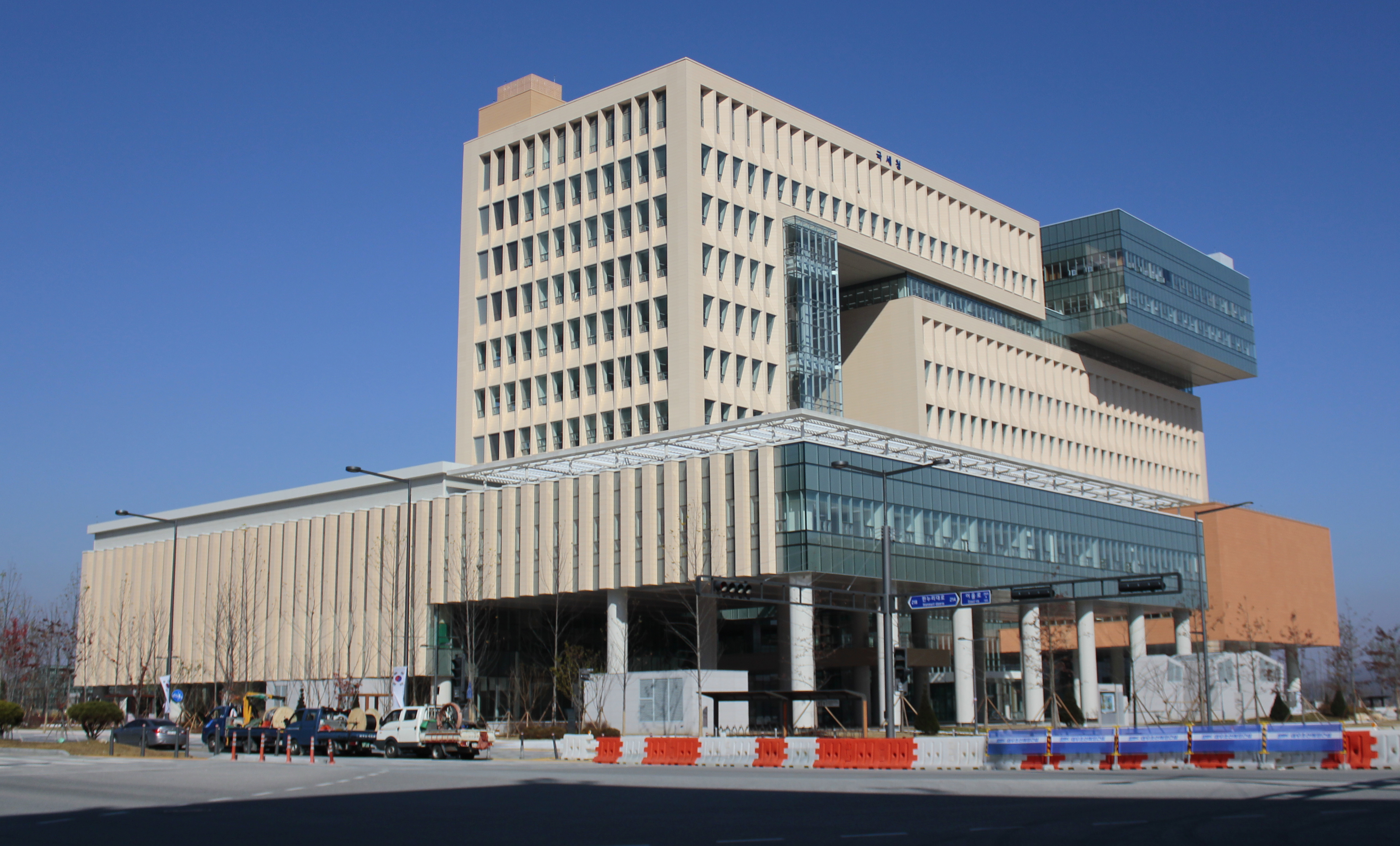
- NTS headquarters in Sejong

Agency overview
- Formed: 1966; 60 years ago
- Jurisdiction: Government of South Korea
- Headquarters: Sejong, South Korea
- Agency executive: Kim Chang-ki, Commissioner
- Parent agency: Ministry of Economy and Finance
- Website: nts.go.kr

Korean name
- Hangul: 국세청
- Hanja: 國稅廳
- RR: Guksecheong
- MR: Kuksech'ŏng

The National Tax Service (Korean: 국세청) is the tax organization in South Korea and is run under the Ministry of Economy and Finance. The headquarters are in Sejong City.

== Whistleblower reward program ==
Whistleblowers can be eligible for rewards under reward programs simultaneously and rewards are for 5-20% of the collected proceeds.

== See also ==
- Korea Customs Service
- List of government agencies of South Korea
