= Anti-Corruption and Civil Rights Commission =

South Korean government agency

- 국민권익위원회

Agency overview
- Formed: February 29, 2008; 18 years ago
- Jurisdiction: Government of South Korea
- Headquarters: 20, Doum 5-ro, Sejong-si, Republic of Korea
- Agency executive: Kim Hong-il, Chairperson of ACRC
- Website: www.acrc.go.kr

Korean name
- Hangul: 국민권익위원회
- Hanja: 國民權益委員會
- RR: Gungmin gwonik wiwonhoe
- MR: Kungmin kwŏnik wiwŏnhoe

The Korean Anti-Corruption and Civil Rights Commission (ACRC) was launched on February 29, 2008, by merging three related government entities: the Ombudsman of Korea, the Korea Independent Commission Against Corruption and the Administrative Appeals Commission. The consolidation of these three organizations was intended to provide citizens with a speedier and more convenient service for filing public complaints and administrative appeals, and for thereby fighting corruption.

ACRC is intended to overhaul the legal and institutional framework in order to offer more convenient and efficient public service to the people by swiftly resolving grievances and spreading a culture of integrity.

== Functions ==
The Anti-Corruption and Civil Rights Commission (ACRC) performs the following three functions:

- Handle and address public complaints and improve related unreasonable systems
- Build a clean society by preventing and deterring corruption in the public sector
- Protect people's rights from illegal and unfair administrative practices through the administrative appeals system

The legal ground for the foundation of ACRC is the Act on the Prevention of Corruption and the Establishment and Management of the Anti-Corruption and Civil Rights Commission (Act No. 9402).

== Chairpersons of the Commission ==
- Jeon Hyun-hee (June 2020 – incumbent)
- Pak Un-jong (June 2017 – June 2020)
- Sung Yung Hoon (December 2015 – June 2017)
- Lee Sung Bo (December 2012 – December 2015)
- Kim Young Ran (January 2011 – November 2012)
- Lee Jae Oh (September 2009 – June 2010)
- Yang Kun (March 2008 – August 2009)

== Structure ==
ACRC consists of a total of 15 commissioners including 1 Chairman (minister-level), 3 Vice-Chairmen (vice minister-level), 3 Standing Commissioners and 8 Non-standing Commissioners. To deal with administrative tasks, the secretariat is set up, divided into three bureaus of Ombudsman, Anti-Corruption and Administrative Appeals. They are headed by each vice-chairman. The status and independence in work of all commissioners are guaranteed by the law.

== See also ==
- List of government agencies of South Korea
- Corruption Investigation Office for High-ranking Officials – Separate office established for investigating and prosecuting corruption.
