= Cho Myung-rae =

South Korean urban planner (born 1955)

- 조명래

Minister of Environment
- In office November 10, 2018 – January 22, 2021
- President: Moon Jae-in
- Prime Minister: Lee Nak-yeon; Chung Sye-kyun
- Preceded by: Kim Eun-kyung
- Succeeded by: Han Jeoung-ae

Personal details
- Born: March 22, 1955 (age 71) Andong, South Korea
- Party: independent
- Education: Dankook University; Seoul National University; University of Sussex

Korean name
- Hangul: 조명래
- Hanja: 趙明來
- RR: Jo Myeongrae
- MR: Cho Myŏngnae

Cho Myung-rae (Korean: 조명래; born March 22, 1955) is a South Korean professor of urban planning at Dankook University who previously served as the Minister of Environment under President Moon Jae-in from 2018 to 2021.

Before appointed the Minister, he was the president of the government-funded research institute, Korea Environment Institute, and the association of heads of the environmental research organisations.

He was previously the co-president of an environment NGO, Environmental Justice (환경정의), from 2011 to 2017 and chair of Seoul's Sustainable Development Committee from 2013 to 2015.

Cho holds four degrees - a bachelor in regional development from Dankook University, a master's in environmental planning from Seoul National University and a master's and a doctorate in urban and regional studies from University of Sussex.
