= Ilsan-gu =

Two districts in Goyang, South Korea

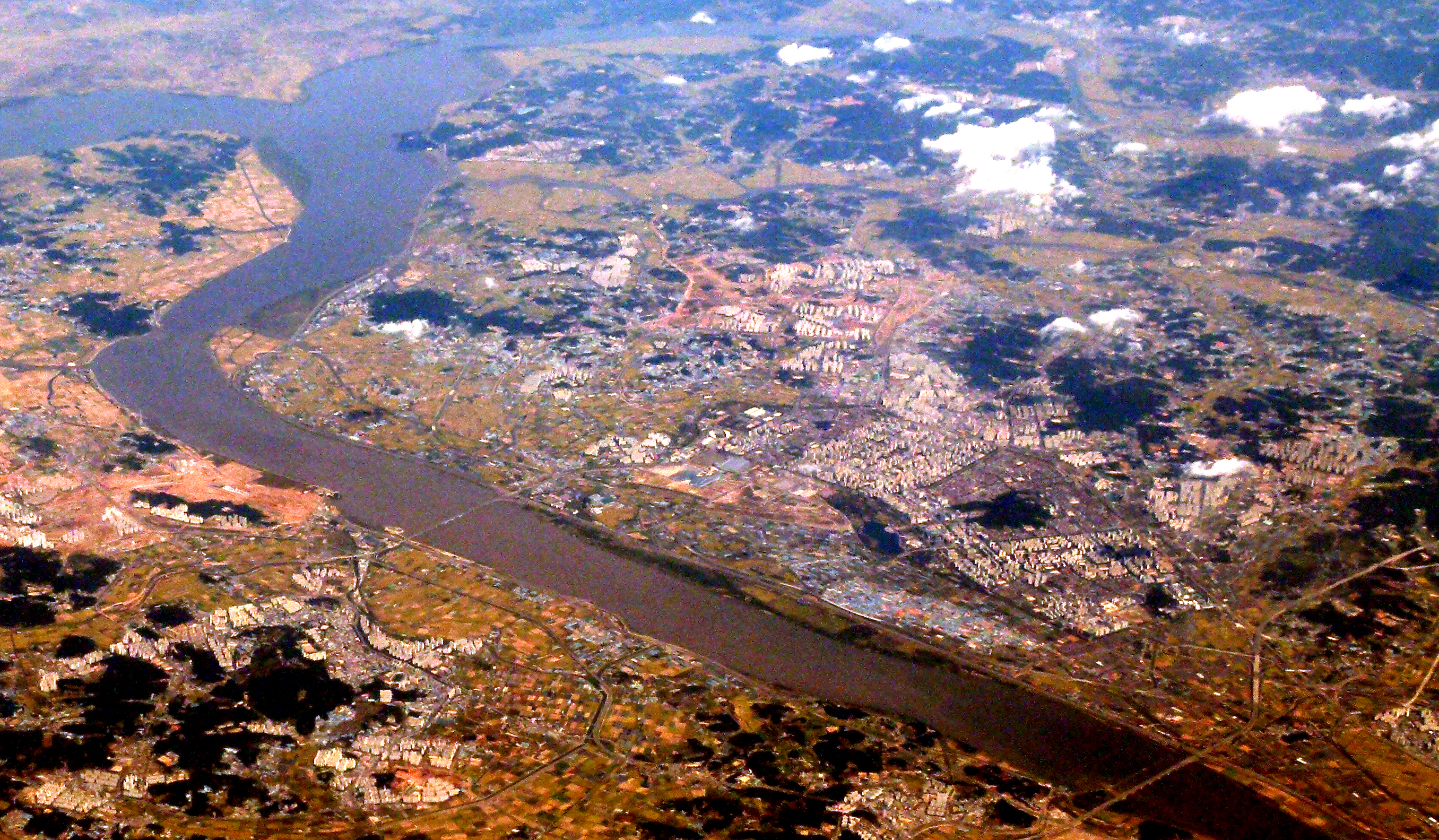
- Bird's-eye view of Ilsanseo-gu of Goyang city

Korean name
- Hangul: 일산구
- Hanja: 一山區
- RR: Ilsan-gu
- MR: Ilsan-gu

Ilsan-gu is the name of two districts or wards (Ilsandong-gu, literally “Eastern Ilsan district”, and Ilsanseo-gu, literally “Western Ilsan district”) in Goyang, Gyeonggi-do, South Korea. Ilsan-gu was divided into Ilsandong-gu and Ilisanseo-gu on May 16, 2005.
