= National Police Commission (South Korea) =

- Hangul: 경찰위원회
- Hanja: 警察委員會
- RR: Gyeongchal wiwonhoe
- MR: Kyŏngch'al wiwŏnhoe

The National Police Commission is the policy making and oversight body of the National Police Agency of South Korea. It is headquartered in Seoul. It was established on July 31, 1991, as part of a general reorganization of the national police force.

== See also ==
- Government of South Korea
- List of South Korean government agencies
- List of law enforcement agencies
- Public safety
