= OnBid =

OnBid, an on line Korean language based South Korean facility, is "the required venue for public notifications regarding the management or disposition of national/public assets or properties" in that country. But chiefly, in conjunction with this, it was designed to facilitate the online trading of property owned by public-sector entities in South Korea. It went into operation in October [2002] and is managed by the Korean Asset Management Company (KAMCO), itself a government run company in South Korea.

As of the end of 2006 some 5,000 public sector institutions and 333,000 private sector individuals and organizations had already become OnBid members.

== Antecedents ==
As of 2003 OnBid was being used as a place where information could be stored and gleaned as regards the property owned by the then 234 provincial and government organizations as well as the Korea Land Corporation, for purposes of auctioning and leasing it.

== From Offline to Online Auctions ==
In 2004 KAMCO decided to cease all offline auctions of property and move it all to the OnBid site where bidding and selling could be done online.

== Interface ==
In order to facilitate immediate communication, essential for the auctioneering process, the use of short message servicing is also used. Also for those not familiar with the Internet, a proxy bid system was also introduced via which online bidding could be effected.

== Future development ==
The OnBid site is managed by KAMCO but the organization continues to seek partnership with online real estate companies and also to offer its facilities to other financial institutions through business relationship. Ultimately OnBid is expected to play an increasingly important role in real estate e-commerce.
