= Korea Institute for International Economic Policy =

South Korean think tank

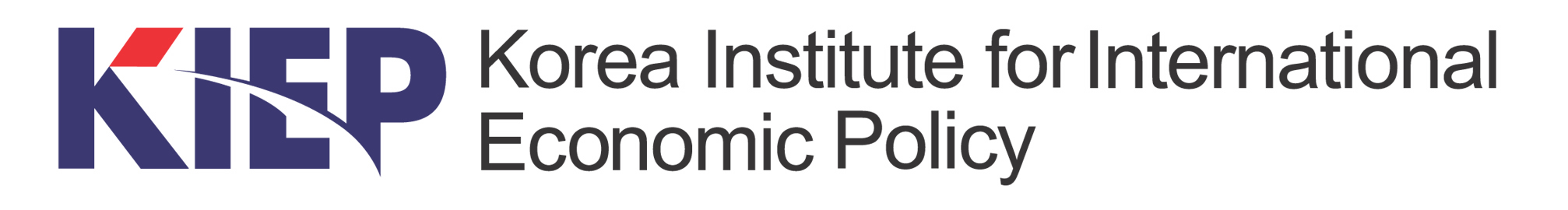
- Abbreviation: KIEP
- Formation: 1989
- Type: Think Tank
- Headquarters: Sejong National Research Complex, 370, Sicheong-daero
- Location: Sejong, South Korea
- Website: https://www.kiep.go.kr/eng/

Korean name
- Hangul: 대외경제정책연구원
- Hanja: 對外經濟政策硏究院
- RR: Daeoe gyeongje jeongchaek yeonguwon
- MR: Taeoe kyŏngje chŏngch'aek yŏn'guwŏn

The Korea Institute for International Economic Policy (KIEP; Korean: 대외경제정책연구원), established in 1989, is a government-funded economic research institute addressing the international economy and its relationship with Korea. The institute's goal is aimed to be a regional hub for international economic policy research and has served as a warehouse of information on Korea's international economic policies for nearly 30 years.

As a government-funded research institute, the KIEP have claimed to accomplished critical research and in-depth analysis on international economic policy issues, including international macroeconomics, finance, trade and commerce, international investment, international financial cooperation, and regional studies for a variety of governmental agencies and research partners.

In July 2023, Professor Siwook Lee was appointed the president of the institute.

The Korea Economic Institute of America is run by the KEIP, and is registered under the Foreign Agents Registration Act.

== History ==
- 1989 KIEP (Korea Institute for International Economic Policy) Foundation established.
- 1989 Special Act for Foundation of KIEP announced; Korea Institute for International Economic Policy officially founded. (KIEP Foundation disbanded.)
- 1990 Supervisory responsibility over US KEI transferred to KIEP, and KOPEC Secretariat relocated to KIEP.
- 1992 Establishment of the Northern Regional Center. (Int’l Private Economic Council of Korea disbanded.)
- 1992 Northern Regional Center renamed as Center for Regional Information.
- 1994 Designated as the secretariat for Korea's Official Pool of International Economists.
- 1994 Designated as the Korea APEC Study Center. (International Economy Coordinating Committee.)
- 1995 KIEP Beijing Office established.
- 1997 Establishment of Center for Northeast Asia Research and Development (CNARD).
- 1997 Center for Regional Information becomes part of KIEP.
- 1999 The Act for the establishment of KIEP changed. (KIEP Act → Act for establishment, operation, and development of government-funded research institutions.)
- 2000 Regional Information Center abolished, and Center for Regional Economic Studies & Research established.
- 2002 Establishment of the DDA Research Center.
- 2003 Center for Northeast Asia Research Development abolished, and Center for Northeast Asian Cooperation established.
- 2005 Establishment of the SNU-KIEP EU Center.
- 2008 Center for Northeast Asian Cooperation abolished, and Center for International Development Cooperation established.
- 2010 China Regional and Provincial Research Group launched.
- 2011 Responsibility for KOPEC Secretariat services transferred to KIEP. (The incorporated association of the KOPEC disbanded and absorbed into KIEP.)
- 2011 Center for Regional Economic Studies & Research abolished, and Center for Emerging Economies Research established.
- 2012 Designated as a specialized research institution for international events by the instructions of the Ministry of Strategy and Finance. (Regulation on international event invitation and hosting.)
- 2012 Korea-China FTA Research Support Group launched.
- 2013 East Asia FTA (EAFTA) Research Support Group launched.
- 2014 G20 Research Support Group launched.
- 2014 Establishment of the KU-KIEP EU Center.
- 2015 Establishment of the Department of Northeast Asian Economies, and the Strategy Research Team.
- 2017 KIEP awarded as a leading research institute in 2016.
- 2018 Center for Area Studies established. (Chinese Economy Department, Advanced Economies Department, New Southern Policy Department, New Northern Policy Department expanded and reorganized.)
- 2020 Center for International Development Cooperation established.

== Organization ==
- International Macroeconomics & Finance Dept.
- International Trade Dept.
- Center for Area Studies
  - Chinese Economy Dept. analyzes Chinese economy.
  - Advanced Economies Dept. analyzes advanced regional economies in America, the EU and Japan and economic cooperation with East Asian nations.
  - New Southern Policy Dept
  - New Northern Policy Dept.
- Center for International Development Cooperation
  - Center for International Development Cooperation
