= Whang San-sung =

South Korean politician

Hwang San-sung
- 황산성

Minister of Environment
- In office February 26, 1993 – December 22, 1993
- President: Kim Young-sam

Personal details
- Born: November 13, 1944 (age 80); Jinju, Korea, Empire of Japan
- Political party: Independent
- Education: Seoul National University
- Religion: Protestant

Hwang San-sung (Korean: 황산성; Hanja: 黃山城; born 13 November 1944) is a retired South Korean politician from Jinju. She was appointed Minister of Environment 1993.
