= Jeong Jong-taek =

South Korean politician (1935–2025)

- 정종택

Member of the National Assembly of South Korea
- In office 11 April 1981 – 29 May 1992

Personal details
- Born: 20 February 1935 Cheongwon County, Korea, Empire of Japan
- Died: 5 November 2025 (aged 90)
- Political party: DJP
- Education: Seoul National University (BA)
- Occupation: Schoolteacher

Jeong Jong-taek (Korean: 정종택; 20 February 1935 – 5 November 2025) was a South Korean politician. A member of the Democratic Justice Party, he served in the National Assembly from 1981 to 1992.

Jeong died on 5 November 2025, at the age of 90.
