= Korea Occupational Safety and Health Agency =

Korea Occupational Safety & Health Agency (Korean: 안전보건공단; Hanja: 韓國産業安全保健公團) is a body in South Korea, which serves to protect the health and safety of Korean workers.

== The advent of KOSHA ==
It was late 1980s that KOSHA (Korea Occupational Safety & Health Agency) Law was released to the public. After the KOSHA Act was released in 1986, the labor department of Korea, which is the competent organization of KOSHA, moved to the next step that set up the plan for establishing KOSHA and inaugurated the institution committee for KOSHA in 1987. Since then, KOSHA has been taking responsibility for the important role in occupational safety and health in the workplace.

It had been a long time for people to look forward to working at the workplace without getting involved in occupational accidents or diseases. It was one of the fastest changing periods for Koreans who lived in during the industrial revolution of Korea. Before moving to the history of KOSHA, we need to examine the environmental and societal circumstances that lead to its development.

Korea experienced significant economic growth, the so-called "the miracle of Han river", during a five-year-long Economic Development Plan beginning in 1962. It resulted from two societal factors, the movement of population from rural to urban environments and the change of major industry. According to the statistic of Koreans agricultural department, the majority of Korean made a living engaging in farming and over 80% of people in Korea belonged to the rural community at that time. In particular, the rice culture that has been the most important crop in Korea since the Lee Dynasty, it required significant physical labor, but the gains from that were in vain, compared to the time and labor that farmers spent on doing that. Also, the Korean government tried to improve the quality of life in an agricultural village, but people who knew a vicious circle of farming were driven into cities which needed less expensive labor. At the very beginning of industrial boom, most small-medium factories and industries could take-off to increase in light of size and quality through using these affluent labor powers.

Thus, as industrial facilities became larger and the process became varied, the rate of exposure to the dangerous materials were increased, numerous occupational disasters and diseases broke out and started to affect the health of workers, both directly and indirectly. Since the statistics of occupational disaster were begun during July, 1964, taking the industrial accidents compensation insurance effect, over two million of workers were involved in occupational accidents. Among them, over 20,000 workers died, the remained became the disabled and the economic loss reached the amount of 6,000 million dollars (KOSHA 20th annual report).

Likewise, as occupational disasters became a bigger issue in the view of society and economics, the Korean government established and released the Occupational and Safety Law in 1981. But that was not enough to stop the growth of the rate of occupational disasters. Even the casualties of industrial accidents continued to increase because of the shortage of the experts and because owners of industries lacked interest. Hence, there were few effective ways to prevent those accidents. Accordingly, the government recognized the seriousness of the incident's harm and searched for a solution by establishing a professional organization for preventing occupational disaster.

Also, there has been pressure from labor unions and from society. Until that time, Korea had been ruled by presidents from army circles since President Park was inaugurated by a military coup in 1961. They did not allow workers to establish trade unions or ask for the enactment of the Labor Union Act, although there were, in name only, Labor Acts such as the Labor Standard Act, the Mediation Act in labor trouble. These were used for the benefit of owners. When seen from the political view, there were a significant number of demonstrations for democracy in Korea. The different point is that workers, including white collar workers, and the general public joined the request. Demonstrations were usually college students' before 1986. Especially, workers called upon substantial laws to reinforce owners who pursued the profit, but were not interested in employees' basic rights. Consequently, the Korean government stepped forward to establish a professional organization intended to protect the basic rights of workers at worksites.

KOSHA's goals involve promoting the safety and health of workers, encouraging efficient business to prevent industrial accidents, and to motivate business proprietors into joining them, contributing to the improvement of economic development. The meanings of the establishment can be summarized as follows.

1. KOSHA offers professional knowledge and experts to establish, national, synthetic and technical systems of occupational accident prevention.
1. KOSHA advocates for providing safe and clean environments for workers and contributes to enlighten Korean society about safety.
1. KOSHA seeks to reduce the rate of industrial disasters that prevent Korea from entering the developed country; it raised the power of national competition to join the OECD. (E-book of the history of KOSHA)

Likewise, KOSHA was established having a significant mission to protect the precious life, physical safety, and health of workers. Also, KOSHA uplifted the quality of life while growing into a professional organization.

== The office organization and staff of KOSHA ==
At the beginning of the institution, there was one headquarters, two branch offices, and one education center. It had 368 employees including, one president and three trustees. KOSHA has reorganized twenty-one times to provide the best service for workers and to deal with the ever-changing society and occupational safety policy of government. The contents of important reforms are as follows.

1. In 1989, the research center was newly established.
1. In 1991, KOSHA extensively reformed the staff organization in accordance with KOSHA Act. Thus, the size of the organization increased and employed over 800 people.
1. In 1995, KOSHA needed to form a division into the department for promoting safety culture to let people get to know the safety at the worksites because big accidents kept occurring.
1. In 2001, KOSHA reorganized the division into teams and founded Human Resource Development (HRD) team.
1. In 2003, KOSHA added one more branch office in Jeju and two chemical research centers to manage chemical materials.
1. In 2004, human power at headquarters was reduced and transferred to 20 branch offices.
1. In 2006, KOSHA has become a flexible organization to support the relationship between businesses and, to make it possible to focus on the scene of labor. Also, the human resources that were separated into technical and management parts, were integrated on one part.
1. At present, KOSHA has a headquarters that consists of nine departments and 19 teams, an education center, a research center, and 20 branch offices around Korea where over 1,300 occupational experts do their best to prevent industrial disasters from happening at the worksite.

Likewise, KOSHA has been required to change with respect to office and staff organization to adapt to the new environment that the world entered into as the age of information and globalization.

== Basic businesses ==
From the beginning, KOSHA played a significant role preventing occupational hazards, accidents, and diseases from worksites. Speaking of the businesses, first we cannot help but talk about the development and spread of prevention technologies, support to educate workers visiting worksites, as well as, analysis and inspection of facilities that are likely to bring the danger or harmfulness, since KOSHA was released.

KOSHA focused on activities such as safety diagnoses, guiding new technologies, and education for workers concerned with safety and health that workers and workplaces were asking for in the beginning. It took two years for KOSHA to develop and spread the systematic ways such as visiting worksites and analyzing causes or doing epidemiology research to find the cause of industrial accidents.

It was in 1995 that KOSHA was absorbed in trying to reduce the rate of occupational accidents because the campaign for safety culture at workplaces was widespread all over the country. Therefore, KOSHA started to take an action that put aside the some amount of money to prevent those accidents in small and medium businesses that were blamed for occupying the 73.5% of total occupational disasters. Also, the rate of industrial accidents was plunged under 1% that is the sign of getting into the developed country.
