= Ministry of Climate, Energy and Environment =

Government ministry of South Korea

- 기후에너지환경부

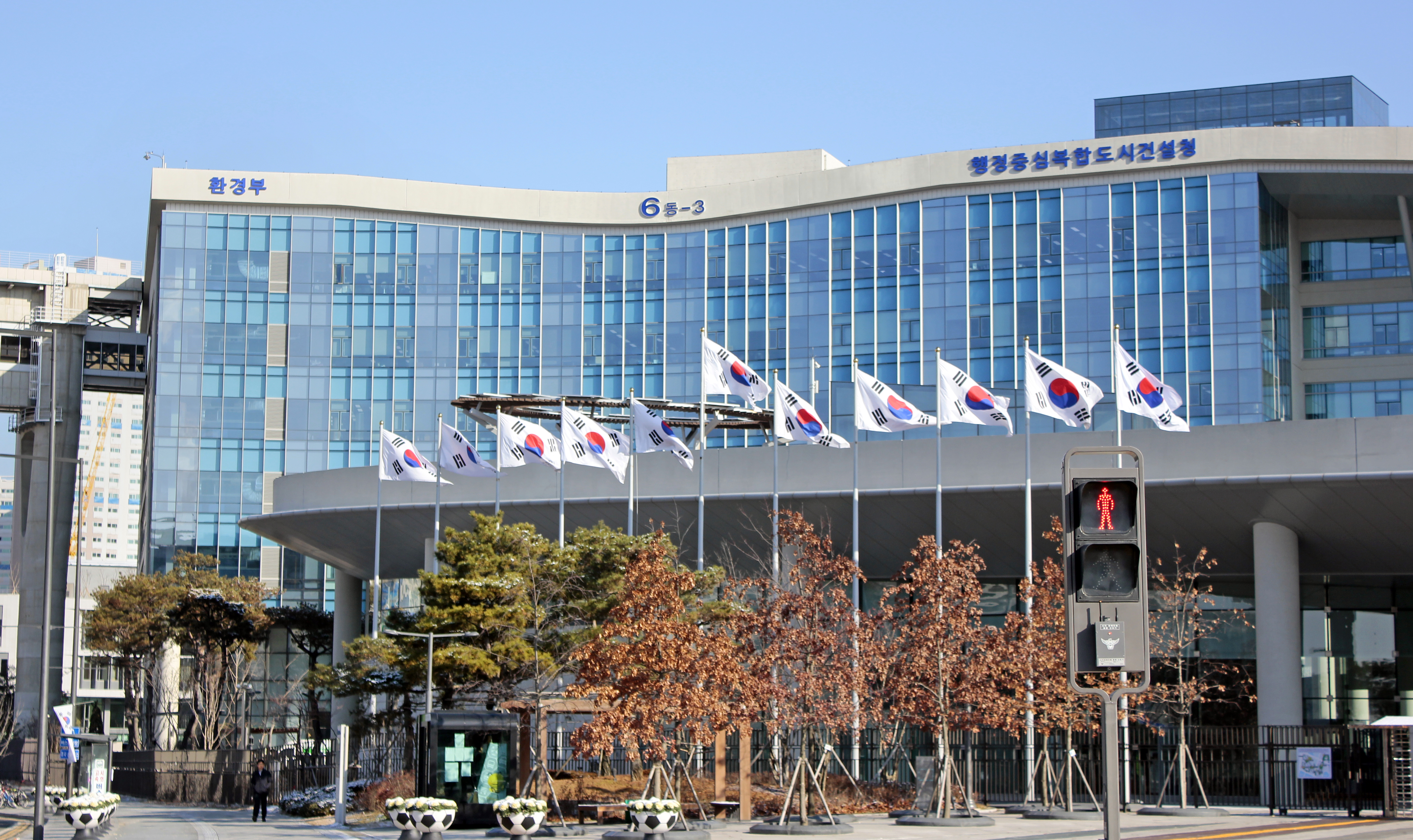
- ME headquarters in Sejong

Agency overview
- Formed: December 24, 1994
- Jurisdiction: Government of South Korea
- Headquarters: Sejong, South Korea
- Minister responsible: Kim Sung-whan
- Deputy Minister responsible: Lee Byeong-hwa
- Child agency: Korea Meteorological Administration
- Website: eng.me.go.kr

Korean name
- Hangul: 기후에너지환경부
- Hanja: 氣候에너지環境部
- RR: Gihu eneoji hwangyeongbu
- MR: Kihu enŏji hwan'gyŏngbu

The Ministry of Climate, Energy and Environment (Korean: 기후에너지환경부) is the South Korea branch of government charged with environmental protection. In addition to enforcing regulations and sponsoring ecological research, the Ministry manages the national parks of South Korea. Its headquarters is in Sejong City.

== Mission ==
The mission of the Ministry of Environment is to protect the national territory from threats of environmental pollution and to improve the quality of life for the public. This includes ensuring the people of South Korea can enjoy the natural environment, clean water and clear skies. Furthermore, the Ministry aims to contribute to the global efforts to protect the Earth. In February 2008, the Korea Meteorological Administration became an affiliate of the Ministry of Environment to facilitate countermeasures against climate change.

Tasks of the Ministry of Environment include

- Enactment and amendment of environmental laws and regulations
- Introduction of environmental institutions
- Building up the framework structure for environmental administration
- Drafting and implementation of mid to long term comprehensive measures for environmental conservation
- Setting up standards for regulations
- Providing administrative and financial support for environmental management to local governments
- Inter-Korean environmental cooperation
- Environmental cooperation with other countries.

== Logo ==
1991~2006

2006-2016

2016~2025

2025~present

== History ==
The environmental authority of the Republic of Korea, began with the Pollution Section of the Ministry of Health and Society, established in 1967, which was expanded to become the Pollution Division, in charge of environmental administration, in 1973. After several reforms and the expansion of environmental authority, the Environment Administration was launched as an affiliate of the Ministry of Health and Society, in 1980. In January 1990, the Environment Administration was elevated to the Ministry of Environment under the Office of the Prime Minister, in order to efficiently integrate and coordinate environmental issues. In December 1994, the Ministry of Environment was given greater authority to establish and implement its own policies. In October 2025 under Lee Jae-myung government, the organization was renamed as the Ministry of Climate, Energy and Environment, in which Ministry of Trade and Industry transferred its energy part.

=== Timeline ===
September 1980	Korea Resources Recovery & Reutilization Corporation (KRRRC) established
July 1980	Six Regional Environmental Monitoring Offices set up
January 1980	Environment Administration (EA) established.
October 1986	The Regional Environmental Monitoring Offices enlarged and re-organized as Environmental Branch Offices.
March 1987	Environmental Management Corporation (EMC) established.
January 1990	EA upgraded to the MOE. Six Regional Environmental Management Offices established.
May. 1991	Central Environmental Disputes Coordination Commission (CEDCC) established.
December 1991	Environmental Officers Training Institute (EOTI) established.
December 1994	As part of a major restructuring of the government, MOE was given greater authority with its functions and manpower increased.
May. 1994	Water Supply and Sewage Treatment Bureau of the Ministry of Construction, Potable Water Management Division of the Ministry of Health and Social Affairs, and Water Quality Inspection Department of the National Health Institute transferred to the MOE. Regional Environmental Management Offices re-organized as four offices, each responsible for one of the four major rivers, and three Regional Environmental Management Offices.
October 1995	The Environmental Investigation Division of the Water Quality Management Bureau and the Incheon Regional Environmental Management Office was established.
August 1996	Marine Environment Division transferred to newly established Ministry of Marine Affairs and Fisheries.
February 1998	Natural Parks Division of the Ministry of Domestic Affairs transferred to the MOE.
May. 1999	The Office of Forestry transferred the operation on protecting wild birds and hunting regulation to the National Institute of Environmental Research.
October 2000	Established National Environmental Conservation to strengthen the efficiency of promoting environmentally friendly National development policy and to prevent environmental damage.
August 2002	Established Total Air Pollution Load Management System.
March 2004	Established Total Air Pollution Load Management System.
January 2005	Established Total Water Pollution Load Management System and Metropolitan Air Quality Management Office.
February 2005	Renamed the Waste Management & Recycling Bureau to the Resource Recirculation Bureau.
April 2005	Unified Innovation & Personnel and Environmental Data & Information to Planning & Management Office for more enhanced policy management functional system.
February 2006	In accordance with the amendment of Toxic Chemicals Control Act, tasks to handle new chemicals and manage restricted and prohibited substances were added.
February 2006	Environmental Assessment Policy Division and Emergency Planning Office were established.
February 2006	Separated Department of Environmental Training under National Institute of Environmental Research and established National Institute of Environmental Human Resources Development.
February 2007	Established National Institute of Biological Resources.
February 2008	Korea Meteorological Administration became an affiliate of the Ministry.
December 2012	Moved its headquarters to Sejong city.
June 2025	Reorganized and Renamed to Ministry of Climate, Environment, and Energy.

== Major policies ==
=== Air ===
- Air Pollutant Emissions Trading System
- Certification of Exhaust Reduction Equipment
- Foul Odor Prevention
- Promotion of Natural Gas Vehicles
- Air Pollution Monitoring
- Clean SYS
- In-use Diesel Vehicle Emissions Control
- Special Measures for Air Quality Improvement in the Seoul Metropolitan Area
- Atmospheric Environmental Standard
- Dust and sandstorms
- Indoor Air Quality
- Volatile Organic Compounds (VOCs) Reduction

=== Water ===
- Drinking Water Quality Standard and Test
- Ecological Stream Restoration Projects
- Environmental Management of Military Facilities
- Environmental Water Quality Standards
- Individual Sewerage
- Non-point Source Pollution Management
- Operation of Water Quality Monitoring Network
- Public Sewerage
- Total Water Pollution Load Management System
- Underground Water Management
- Water Environment Management Master Plan
- Water Use Charge
- Whole Effluent Toxicity Management System

==== Riparian buffer zone designation system ====
This is a system that restricts the construction of restaurants, accommodation, spas, factories, and warehouses by establishing a certain section of a river as a buffer zone connecting the aquatic ecosystem and the terrestrial ecosystem for the purpose of securing a healthy aquatic ecosystem and clean water, and designating a Riparian Buffer Zone to form a Riparian Buffer Forest after buying lands near the waterside one by one, through agreements with residents.

For the Han River watershed, 255 km^{2} adjacent to Paldonghosu, Namhan River, Bukhan River, and Kyoungan stream was first designated as a Riparian Zone in September 1999. Three successive changes have reduced its size to 191.3 km^{2}. For the Nakdong River, Geum River, and Yeongsan River watershed, major dams and the land near stream flow and lakes, which were used as a water source, were designated as Riparian Buffer Zones in September 2003. For the Nakdong River watershed, three changes have been applied, making the designated area 339.9 km^{2}. For the Geum River watershed, three changes have been applied, making the designated area 373.2 km^{2}. For Yeongsan River watershed, four changes have been applied, making the designated area 295.6 km^{2}.

However, the following areas were excluded from the Riparian Buffer Zones: Water source protection areas, development restriction areas, and military facility protection areas, which were already subject to other regulations; sewage disposal areas, anticipated sewage disposal areas, and city areas and settlement areas designated by the Utilization Management of the Land Act that had an existing environmental infrastructure; and natural villages above level 5 for Nakdong River and above level 10 for Geum River and Yeongsan River. For areas designated as Riparian Buffer Zones, new construction of pollution sources such as restaurants, accommodation, spas, apartment housing, factories and warehouses are prohibited. After three years from an area's designation as a Riparian Buffer Zone, the existing pollution sources must discharge sewage only after it has been processed to BOD and SS levels below 10ppm.

==== Toxic pollutants effluent standard ====
To maintain public water quality at a level that is safe for human and animal health and for the growth of plants, pollution materials subject to management are designated under the Act on Water Quality and Ecosystem Conservation. Currently, 40 kinds of organic materials, including copper, lead, nickel, and cyanogens, are designated as water pollutants. To manage water quality safety, heavy metals and phenols are designated as specific water pollution material.

An emission standard is one of the regulatory methods to achieve environmental standards, and restricts the concentration of discharge water from a discharging business. The standard is set with consideration given to environmental standards and purification capacity of a stream. The Act on Water Quality and Ecosystem Conservation applies wastewater emission standards to 29 items (e.g., organic materials, suspended solids, and phenols), and classifies the water quality of each watershed into 4 levels (Clean, Ga, Na, Special) for each region.

Organic material and suspended solids are handled differently according to the amount of wastewater discharged from a business. That is, considering the effect that it has on the stream, stricter emission standards are applied to a business that discharges wastewater in the amount of more than 2,000 m^{3}/day than to smaller businesses, in order to incorporate a quantity regulation method as well as a concentration regulation method. Taking the capacity of wastewater processing facilities into account, special emission standards are applied to businesses whose wastewater flows into wastewater processing facilities in industrial complexes or agricultural/industrial complexes.

Since 1997, emission standards regarding nitrogen and phosphorus materials have been applied to all businesses located at Paldang Lake, Daecheong Lake, Nakdong River and Nakdong Estuary watershed to prevent the eutrophication of lakes and marshes. All businesses in Korea have been subject to the same standards since 2003.

The amount of chemicals discharged from industries into the watershed have increased with the growth of the chemical industry and the increase in international trade. Therefore, pilot studies on the ecotoxicity of discharged water for fish (minnow), daphnia magna, and birds have been undertaken since 2002, to examine the toxicity of unknown harmful materials outside of emission standards items. The Act on Water Quality and Ecosystem Conservation was amended in November 2007 to adopt an integrated toxicity management system based on the result of this research.

==== Telemetry Monitoring System (TMS) ====
Tele-Monitoring System (TMS) refers to a system that monitors the emission state of pollution materials on a 24-hour basis by creating an online connection between automatic measurement devices, which are attached to the discharging outlet of wastewater processing facilities and wastewater-producing businesses, and a remote water quality control center.

The objective is to prevent water pollution by managing and monitoring the quality of discharged water, while inducing each business to make efforts for production process improvement by analyzing and managing water pollution levels. A reasonable and objective effluent charge is determined in order to improve policy credibility by identifying the exact pollution level for each period of time. Technical support and consultation for the establishment of control methods for the pollutants discharged by a business are provided, through the continuous assessment and analysis of the pollution level by the remote control of water quality.

Business	Wastewater Amount or Process Capacity	Period
Class 1	2,000 m3/day or more	2008.9.30
Class 2	700 m3/day to 1,999 m3/day	2009.9.30
Sewage processing facilityㆍ Wastewater processing facility	Sewage: More than 100,000 m3/day Wastewater: Less than 10,000m3/day	2008.5.·19
Sewage processing facilityㆍ Wastewater processing facility	Sewage: More than 10,000 m3/day / Less than 100,000 m3/day Wastewater: Process capacity less than 10,000 m3/day (Discharged amount: 700 m3/day or more)	2008.11.19
Sewage processing facilityㆍ Wastewater processing facility	Sewage: 2,000 m3/day or more / Less than 10,000 m3/day	2009.11.19

=== Soil ===
Soil pollution is different from other environmental pollution in that it is almost impossible to detect soil contamination by eye. Such pollution cannot be recognized until it has progressed to a certain level, and there is a long time delay between the pollution activity and the onset of damage. In addition, the effect of soil pollution is very long-lasting. Once soil is polluted, it is hard to remove the pollution; it takes a great deal of time and expense.

Soil goes through three phases: solid, liquid and gas. The solid phase consists of inorganic material from stone weathering, dead bodies of animals and plants, and organic materials of living organisms. The liquid phase refers to soil water. The gas phase refers to soil air. Though soil comes from stone weathering, it takes various forms such as clay, silt, sand, and gravel, depending on the mineral compositions of rocks and metamorphic processes. Soil performs numerous environmental functions, including flood prevention, water containment, water purification, landslide prevention, erosion prevention, pollutant filtering, regulation of surface temperature and humidity, and protection of living organisms and vegetation.

Seventeen materials are designated as soil pollutants in Korea according to the Soil Environment Conservation Act, including cadmium, copper, arsenic, mercury, oil, and organic solvents. Each material is subject to two standards: one represents a pollution level that could negatively affect people's health and property and the growth of animals and plants; the other is for soil pollution countermeasures where pollution exceeds the standard and actually harms people's health and property and the growth of animals and plants.

Soil pollution standards classify soil by its various uses in accordance with the Cadastral Act. That is, farms and woodlands that are less likely to be polluted are classified as 'Ga' areas; factory sites, roads and railway sites that are more likely to be polluted are classified as 'Na' areas.

Soil is mainly polluted by human activities, production activities in agriculture and manufacturing, the overuse of pesticides and fertilizers, mineral discharge from mining activities, heavy metals and noxious chemicals from industrial activities, waste reclamation, and the diffusion and falling of pollutants from the air. The efforts made by the government to manage soil and protect it from such pollution sources are as follows:

- To utilize soil pollution status and trends as basic data for establishing policies, the levels of pollution in the entire country have been continuously monitored. Currently, soil pollution surveys are done in two different ways: one is through networks that are operated by the Minister of Environment; the other is through soil pollution status surveys that are performed on behalf of mayors and provincial officers (the heads of Gun and the heads of Gu).
- Targets for special soil pollution management such as oil manufacturing and storage facilities whose capacity is bigger than 20,000 liters, noxious material manufacturers and storage facilities, and pipeline facilities must be reported to mayors, the head of Gun, and the head of Gu, and checked for soil pollution level inspection and leakage tests for the purpose of reinforcing the soil pollution preventive system.
- Five major oil refining companies have voluntarily signed an agreement to prevent soil pollution and restore degraded soil environment. They are SK Co. Ltd., GS Caltex Co. Ltd., and Hyundai Oilbank Co. Ltd. which handle more than 90% of the distributed oil in the country and the Korea National Oil Corporation which possesses large-scale oil storage facilities.
- Both general and detailed surveys on the soil pollution status of 936 deserted metal mines across the country have been executed since 1992. Related ministries and offices carried out soil pollution prevention projects for mines in which contamination had been identified, such as the prevention of damage caused by mine-related pollution and improvement of farmland soil.
- 'Clean Gas Stations', which are equipped with dual-wall tanks, dual pipe lines, tanks and pumps have been designated to prevent soil pollution caused by facility corrosion and oil leakage from superannuated facilities.

=== Waste ===
- Business Waste Minimization System
- Control of Packaging Waste
- Control on Waste Import and Export
- Designated (Hazardous) Waste Management
- EPR (Extended Producer Responsibility)
- Empty Container Return Deposit System
- Mandatory Use of Electronic Report on Waste Transfer
- Medical Waste Management
- Recycling of Electrical and Electronic Equipment and Vehicles
- Restriction on the Use of Disposable Products
- Volume Based Waste Fee System
- Waste to Energy Policy

==== Food waste reduction ====
Each local government has established different standards for the separation and discharge of food waste according to the status of disposal facilities in its region, such as whether it is possible to reutilize food waste as a resource.

As food waste, which belongs to household wastes, causes secondary environmental pollution such as the odor or sewage produced from landfill sites, the government established in July 1995 the 'Committee for the Management of Food Waste' which involves 8 central agencies, and this committee worked together to prepare measures for the handling of food waste. In 2002, with the Korea-Japan FIFA World Cup providing momentum for the establishment of an eco-friendly food consumption culture, the government pushed local governments, restaurant organizations, and civil organizations to establish a voluntary agreement for the reduction of food waste, and implemented it with a focus on the cities in which the football games of the World Cup were to be held. This voluntary agreement has been applied to the entire country since 2003.

The government has been working with civil organizations since 2002 to develop an educational program that encourages the reduction of food waste. Major projects included holding "The day of no food waste" every Wednesday, "Designating Eco-Friendly Restaurant" and launching a "Plates with No Food Left" campaign. Advertisements for food waste reduction have been broadcast on TV, radio, and electric billboards, and a cartoon was produced and distributed to elementary schools across the country to familiarize children with the concept of food waste reduction. It is considered that these activities have helped to inspire a culture of food waste reduction among the people of Korea.

As a result of the public awareness campaign for food waste reduction, the amount of daily food waste in 2006 was at 13,372 tons and accounted for 27.4% of the total amount of daily household waste (48,844 tons), which is still a relatively high percentage, yet shows a downward trend compared with 29.1% in 1996.

However, as food waste that was discharged separately from other wastes increased following the prohibition of direct food waste landfill (January 1, 2005), and the consumption of fruits and vegetables increased with the trend to a healthy lifestyle, it turned out that the amount of food waste produced in 2006 increased significantly.

Therefore, the government began to provide funds (30% of the total funds required) to establish public disposal facilities that transform food waste into feed for poultry, compost and bio-mass, and has been promoting the cooperation and participation of citizens to establish a culture of resource recycling in Korean society.

==== Waste charge system ====
The waste charge system is a system that charges the manufacturer of the product part of the cost involved in disposing of a product that contains hazardous materials or that is not easy to recycle and may cause problems in waste management, in order to restrict waste generation and prevent the wasteful use of resources.

The waste charge system is intended to reduce the production of waste from the manufacturing stage and promote the efficient disposal of waste.

The items on which waste charges are imposed include insecticides, containers of toxic chemicals, antifreeze, chewing gum, disposable diapers, cigarettes, and plastic products.

Waste charges are used for the research and development of technology to reduce the weight of waste and recycle waste, the installation of waste disposal facilities, financing for waste recycling projects, financial support for local governments to collect and recycle waste, and the purchase and storage of recyclable resources.

=== Green growth ===
The concept of "green growth" was first adopted at the "Ministerial Conference on Environment and Development" jointly hosted by the Ministry of Environment and UNESCAP in 2005. It was initiated by Korea, the host country, and included in the outcome of the Conference, "Seoul Initiative Network on Green Growth".

Green growth is developed to introduce sustainable economic growth model for the future based on Korea's experience in implementing environmental protection with economic growth. Green Growth is a concept developed to complement the existing concept of sustainable development (integration of economic, social development and environmental conservation) since 'sustainable development' is too abstract and broad. Green Growth aims to shift the pattern of economic growth into an environment friendly one.

The project to develop the concept of green growth was supported by many research institutes including the Korea Environment Institute, the Korea Institute for Industrial Economics and Trade, the Korea Institute of Public Finance, and scholars from the fields of economics and the environment.

The concept of environmentally sustainable green growth links 'Environmental Performance' and 'Environmental Sustainability'. Policy measures to pursue green growth are eco-tax reform, and disclosure of company's environmental information.

Green growth is the concept that embodies the harmony of environment (Green) and economy (Growth). Green growth 2 has two implication in term of the relationship of economy and environment. Green growth 1 (Economy→Environment) means that economic growth does not harm but improves the environment. Green growth 2 (Environment → Economy) means that environment conservation can be the new growth driver of the economy.

=== Green living ===
- Eco-labeling system
- Environmental Education
- Environmental Industry
- Environmental Technology
- Environmental-friendly Products
- Environmentally-friendly Company Designation System

=== Nature ===
- Eco-Village
- Ecosystem and Landscape Conservation Areas
- Endangered Species Protection
- Environmental Impact Assessment System
- LMOs (Living Modified Organisms)
- National Long-term Ecological Research Project
- National Trust System for the Natural Environment
- Nature Park
- Prior Environmental Review System
- Wetland Protection Areas
- Wildlife Protection and Management

=== Human health & chemicals ===
- Asbestos
- Chemical Terrorism and Accidents
- Dioxin aka "Agent Orange" was used in South Korea during the Vietnam War era, to defoliate areas along the DMZ. The South Korean Army also used Agent Orange to spray areas around NIKE Missile sites in the 1960s and 1970s at such bases as Camp Humphreys.
- Endocrine Disruptors
- Hazardous Chemicals Control
- Health Impact Assessment System
- Nano Materials
- POPs (Persistent Organic Pollutants)
- Polychlorinated biphenyls (PCBs)
- Response to REACH
- Restricted or Prohibited Chemicals Designation System
- Risk Assessment
- Toxics Release Inventory(TRI)

=== International cooperation ===
- CBD (Convention on Biological Diversity)
- Cooperation with America
- Cooperation with OECD
- Cooperation with UNEP
- Korea-China-Japan Cooperation
- Cooperation with Africa
- Cooperation with ESCAP
- Cooperation with Southeast Asia
- FTA-related Environmental Agreement
- Ramsar Convention
- Cooperation with Europe
- Cooperation with UNCSD
- International Climate Change Negotiations
- CITES

=== Climate change ===
- CDM Projects
- Greenhouse Gas Labeling System
- Smart ways to reduce CO_{2}
- Support for Local Governments In Responding to Climate Change

== Offices ==
Previously the ministry had its headquarters in Gwacheon, Gyeonggi Province. In 2013, the ministry moved its headquarters to Sejong City.

== Regulatory reform ==
The Ministry of Environment has made significant success in improving water and air quality and conserving ecosystems by introducing various environmental regulations. However, in order to overcome the recent economic downturn and strengthen national competitiveness, it is necessary to conduct regulatory reforms, without undermining environmental quality, to create a better business environment, reduce public inconvenience and to raise the effectiveness of regulations.

To this end, Ministry of Environment will consider the life cycle and characteristics of companies in carrying out regulatory reforms, and ensure that such reforms contribute to improvements in the daily lives of the general public.

A more prudent approach is needed for environmental regulations as environmental issues often involve conflicts of interests and lack of scientific evidence. Therefore, the ministry plans to prevent social conflicts and environmental degradation by promoting communication among various stakeholders and securing environmental expertise.

=== Environmental impact assessment ===
The Korean government introduced systems to examine the environmental impacts of land development projects such as environmental impact assessment (EIA) and prior environmental review system (PERS). The government came up with measures to improve the systems to shorten time and avoid overlapping each other.

1. Under the EIA, all projects were subject to all test items (a total of 20) in the past, but now the government has adopted two streamlined processes according to the characteristics of a specific project. One is the "Scoping Process" under which an examination is conducted on necessary test items only. The other is "Simplified Assessment" which streamlines requirements for getting consent from local communities and consultation on documents of assessment when a project has a lesser environmental impact. "Scoping Process" and "Simplified Assessment" have been in effect since January 2009.
2. Small factories in "Planned Areas" are now exempted from PERS which had been applied to all factories.
3. As Korea has advanced its IT infrastructure, the government established the "Environmental Impact Assessment Support System" (EIASS) to provide all the information needed to draw up assessment documents. The EIASS provides free data, including measurements of environmental quality, ecosystem maps, historic sites, information on forests, geographical data, cadastral maps, and meteorological information.
4. To fundamentally solve problems with EIA and PERS, the government is working to unify the legal basis of EIA and PERS into a single law. "The Act on EIA and Other Environmental Assessment Systems" is in the making with a focus on the aims and process of consultation and ways of assessment. When the act comes into force in 2010, the period of assessment will be shortened by 30-40% (about 5–6 months), and the cost for drawing up assessment documents will be cut by 30%.

=== Seoul metropolitan area regulations ===
Areas allowed for land development within regions subject to Total Maximum Daily Load (TMDL) will be increased. Environmental protection areas in and around the capital city of Seoul (including eight local governments in Gyeonggi Province) were banned from large-scale development projects as those areas are mostly located near the catchment area of the Paldang Dam which supplies drinking water to about 23 million people in Seoul, the city of Incheon and Gyeonggi Province. However, progress in enhancing the water quality of the Paldang Dam has been slow, due to small development projects that are not subject to the above-mentioned regulation.

Therefore, the government changed the direction of water quality policy from regulations on the size of developed areas to the amount of water pollutants. In January 2009, the government allowed areas with the TMDL system to carry out development projects regardless of the scale of the projects if they meet the TMDL standard.

The environmental protection areas in the Seoul metropolitan area are known for their beautiful landscapes and being accessible to large cities. With focus on eco-tourism, the regulations are eased for investment to create large tourist areas.

=== Discharge of industrial wastewater ===
Under the past regulation, building factories was banned within a certain distance from the upstream areas of water source. As a result, wide areas near the water source (at maximum of 20 km from the point of collecting water) were strictly controlled.

But some expressed concern that the regulation is too strict for plants discharging only pollutants similar to sewage from households.

To solve that problem, the government revised relevant laws in December 2008. It eased the regulation on factories that meet certain standards such as not discharging industrial waste waster and treating all emitted sewage through public sewerage system. So the limit on distance was reduced to 7 km upstream from water collection sites.

=== Advanced air pollution management ===
To control air pollutants more effectively, Ministry of Environment introduced the Telemetry Monitoring System (TMS) on the smokestacks of plants in 1997, and Total Air Pollution Load Management System in 2007.

TMS and Total Air Pollution Load Management System have been recognized as advanced systems in that TMS enables real-time monitoring of the concentrations of air pollutants and Total Air Pollution Load Management System encourages effective management of air pollution in places of business through a quota system. However, the two systems put economic burdens on companies. Therefore, the government has come up with measures to reduce such burdens without undermining the effectiveness of the systems.

First of all, improvements made on Total Air Pollution Load Management System include:

1. the allocation of the quota on dust has been suspended as it is difficult to set the quota because dust varies in types and characteristics.
2. currently the government is going to exclude Type 3 plants (mid-sized plants) from the system by revising relevant laws as those plants emit few air pollutants.

Next, some changes were made on TMS System as follows:

1. Installing and managing TMS device is expensive. So the government has decided not to impose the Basic Emission Charge, which is determined according to the amount of air pollutants emitted.
2. if companies exceed their quota unavoidably for a short period of time due to problems with their production system, they are exempted from administrative penalties.
3. the government will provide financial support to small- and medium-sized companies from 2009 for installing and managing TMS devices.

=== Condominiums and cable cars in natural parks ===
Heavy restrictions have been put on land development in protected areas and on historic sites designated as natural parks for public interest. However, building tourist facilities such as accommodation was also limited, causing inconveniences to local residents and visitors. Constructing condominiums in natural parks has been restricted since early 1990, because such buildings could lead to a sense of inequality among different social classes. But recent surveys on local residents near natural parks and the general public showed that the majority of respondents were in favor of building condominiums in natural parks. And the demand for tourism has been increasing since the introduction of a 5-day workweek system. For these reasons, the government decided to lift restrictions on building condominiums in natural parks. Also, the government has eased regulations on establishing cable cars in natural parks. In the latter half of 2009, limits on distance will be lowered from 2 km to 5 km, which will lead to more cable cars in natural parks. Such deregulation will enable more convenient trips for visitors and attract investment from the private sector for local development.

=== Toxicity of new chemicals ===
In Korea, manufacturers or importers of new chemicals are required to get toxicity examination on the chemicals by submitting a document on toxicity issued by certified laboratories. Certified laboratories were limited to domestic organizations only, so companies that had examination documents issued by overseas laboratories could not use their documents.

To resolve this, the government altered laws in June 2008 so that certified laboratories include laboratories in OECD countries. That reduced costs and time for drawing up examination documents, and laid the foundation for improved management of harmful chemicals through mutual recognition of test data with OECD countries.

If companies produce or import a small amount of new chemicals, or new chemicals are embedded in machines or equipment, it is not necessary to conduct a toxicity examination. Those companies or chemicals are given exemption from toxicity examinations, which reduces the time it takes to produce or import such chemicals.

== List of ministers ==
Title	Minister	Incumbency	Under
Administrator of the Environmental Protection Agency	Bark Seung-Gyu	1980-01-01/1980-07-02	
Administrator of the Environmental Protection Agency	Bark Jun-Ik	1980-07-19/1983-07-09	
Administrator of the Environmental Protection Agency	Choe Suh-Il	1983-07-09/1986-05-24	
Administrator of the Environmental Protection Agency	Bark Pan-Jae	1986-05-24/1988-05-20	
Administrator of the Environmental Protection Agency	Lee Sang-Bae	1988-05-20/1989-07-21	
Administrator of the Environmental Protection Agency	Lee Jae-Chang	1989-07-21/1990-01-03	
Minister of the Environment	Jo Gyeong-Sik	1990-01-03/1990-09-19	
Minister of the Environment	Heo Nam-Hoon	1990-09-19/1991-04-26	
Minister of the Environment	Gwon Lee-Hyuk	1991-04-26/1992-06-26	
Minister of the Environment	Lee Jae-Chang	1992-06-26/1993-12-22	
Minister of the Environment	Whang San-sung	1993-12-22/1994-12-21	
Minister of the Environment	Kim Joong-wi	1994-12-21/1995-12-21	
Minister of the Environment	Jeong Jong-taek	1995-12-21/1996-12-20	
Minister of the Environment	Kang Hyun-wook	1996-12-20/1997-08-06	
Minister of the Environment	Yun Yeo-Jun	1997-08-06/1998-03-03	
Minister of the Environment	Choi Jae-uk	1998-03-03/1999-05-24	
Minister of the Environment	Son Sook	1999-05-24/1999-06-25	
Minister of the Environment	Kim Myung-Ja	1999-06-27/2003-02-27	
Minister of the Environment	Han Myung-Sook	2003-02-27/2004-02-16	
Minister of the Environment	Kwak Kyul-Ho	2004-02-18/2005-06-28	
Minister of the Environment	Lee Jae-Yong	2005-06-29/2006-03-21	
Minister of the Environment	Lee Chi-Beom	2006-04-07/2007-09-04	
Minister of the Environment	Lee Kyoo-Yong	2006-09-21/2008-02-29	
Minister of the Environment	Lee Maan-Ee	2008-02-29/2013-02-24	
Minister of the Environment	Yoon Seong-kyu	2013-02-25/2016-09-04	
Minister of the Environment	Cho Kyeong-gyu	2016-09-05/2017-07-03	
Minister of the Environment	Kim Eun-kyung	2017-07-04/2018-11-09	
Minister of the Environment	Cho Myung-rae	2018-11-10/2021-01-22	
Minister of the Environment	Han Jeoung-ae	2021-01-22~present	

== See also ==
- Environment of South Korea
