= Jung–Seongdong B =

Political constituency in South Korea

- Single-member constituency for the National Assembly
- Location of the constituency
- District(s): Jung District; Seongdong District (part)
- Region: Seoul
- Electorate: 177,422 (2024)

Current constituency
- Created: 2016
- Seats: 1
- Party: Democratic Party of Korea
- Member of Parliament: Park Sung-joon
- Council constituency: Jung 1st district Jung 2nd district Seongdong 1st district
- Created from: Jung; Seongdong A (part)

Jung–Seongdong B (Korean: 중구·성동구 을) is a constituency of the National Assembly of South Korea. The constituency consists of Jung District and part of Seongdong District. As of 2024, 177,422 eligible voters were registered in the constituency.

== List of members of the National Assembly ==
Election	Member	Party	Dates	Notes
2016	Ji Sang-wook	Saenuri	2016–2020	Spokesperson of the Saenuri Party (2016)
2020	Park Sung-joon	Democratic	2020–present	KBS Daejeon Television Station announcer (1996–2011); JTBC announcer (2011–2020)
2024	Park Sung-joon	Democratic	2020–present	KBS Daejeon Television Station announcer (1996–2011); JTBC announcer (2011–2020)

== Election results ==
=== 2024 ===
Legislative Election 2024: Jung–Seongdong B
Party	Candidate	Votes	%	±%
Democratic	Park Sung-joon	61,728	50.81	▼1.15
People Power	Lee Hye-hoon	58,961	48.53	▲1.26
Korea National	Kim Young-ki	787	0.65	new
Rejected ballots		1,611	–	
Turnout		123,087	69.38	▲1.53
Registered electors		177,422		
Democratic hold		Swing		

=== 2020 ===
Legislative Election 2020: Jung–Seongdong B
Party	Candidate	Votes	%	±%
Democratic	Park Sung-joon	64,071	52.0	+27.7
United Future	Ji Sang-wook	58,300	47.3	+9.3
National Revolutionary Dividends	Lee Ju-yang	937	0.8	new
Rejected ballots		1,392	–	–
Turnout		124,700	67.9	–
Registered electors		183,779		
Democratic gain from United Future		Swing		

=== 2016 ===
Legislative Election 2016: Jung–Seongdong B
Party	Candidate	Votes	%	±%
Saenuri	Ji Sang-wook	37,981	38.0	new
People	Chung Ho-joon	36,231	36.3	new
Democratic	Lee Ji-su	24,307	24.3	new
People's United	Kim Su-jung	1,096	1.1	new
Let's go Korea	Jeong Jae-bok	253	0.3	new
Rejected ballots		1,056	–	–
Turnout		100,924	58.5	–
Registered electors		172,600		
Saenuri win (new seat)				

== See also ==
- List of constituencies of the National Assembly of South Korea
