= Lee Sang-kyu =

South Korean politician (born 1965)

- 이상규
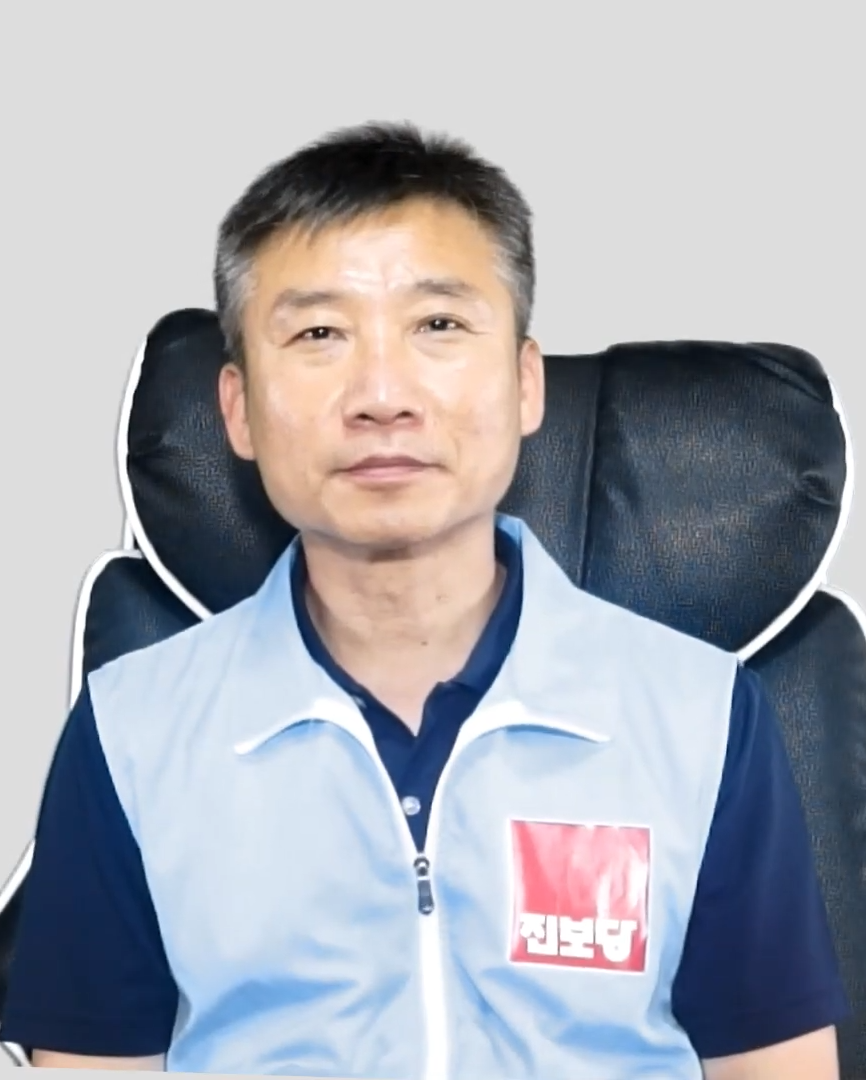
- Lee Sang-kyu in 2023

Permanent President of the Minjung Party
- In office 26 August 2018 – 20 June 2020
- Preceded by: Kim Jong-hoon; Kim Chang-han
- Succeeded by: Kim Jae-yeon

Member of the National Assembly
- In office 30 May 2012 – 19 December 2014
- Preceded by: Kim Hui-chul
- Succeeded by: Oh Shin-hwan
- Constituency: Gwanak B (Seoul)

Personal details
- Born: 7 January 1965 (age 61) Jecheon, North Chungcheong, South Korea
- Party: Progressive
- Other political affiliations: NVD21 (1997–1999); DLP (2000–2011); UPP (2011–2014); PUP (2016–2017); NPP (2017); Minjung (2017–2020)
- Spouse: Kim Hyang-soo
- Children: 3
- Education: Seoul National University
- Occupation: Activist, labourer, politician

Lee Sang-kyu (Korean: 이상규, born 7 January 1965) is a South Korean activist, labourer and politician. He was the Permanent President of the Minjung Party, a minor left-wing nationalist political party. He was elected as the Member of National Assembly for Gwanak 2nd constituency in 2012 but invalidated by court order in 2014.

== Early life ==
Born in Jecheon, Lee attended Yongmoon High School, and earned a bachelor's degree in public law from Seoul National University. He joined a student movement, as well as serving as the President of the Student Council of his faculty. Following the graduation, he became a labourer, working at print shops and construction sites. He was also a member of the Korean Confederation of Trade Unions.

He is also a colleague to Kim Jin-tae, the Liberty Korea MP for Chuncheon.

== Political career ==
Lee was an independent Guro District Council member candidate for Sindorim-dong in 1995 but was not elected. He helped Kwon Young-ghil, the presidential candidate of the National Victory for Development 21 in 1997. After the party was refounded as the Democratic Labour Party (DLP; then Unified Progressive Party), he subsequently joined and ran for a Seoul Metropolitan Council member in 2002 but lost.

Lee ran 8th in the DLP list at the 2008 election but was not elected; in fact, DLP only gained 2 FPTPs and 3 PRs. He was selected as the DLP MP candidate for Eunpyeong 2nd constituency at the 2010 by-election, though he abandoned his campaign.

At the 2012 election, both the Democratic Unionist Party (DUP) and the Unified Progressive Party (UPP) agreed to put unity candidates in some constituencies, including Gwanak 2nd. Originally, Lee Jung-hee, one of the co-Presidents of the UPP, won the opposition preselection over Kim Hui-chul, the DUP candidate and the incumbent MP. However, Kim subsequently left DUP and ran as an independent candidate, citing that the preselection was rigged. Lee Jung-hee was forced to withdraw, making Lee Sang-kyu to replace her. He received 38.24%, defeating Oh Shin-hwan (Saenuri) and Kim Hui-chul (Independent).

The UPP was banned by the court order on 19 December 2014, in which the elections of its all MPs were nullified. Lee announced his bid as an independent candidate at the 2015 by-election, but then withdrew. In the end, the Saenuri candidate Oh Shin-hwan, who lost to Lee in 2012, was finally elected, making him as the first conservative candidate of the liberal-leaning constituency since its creation in 1988.

Prior to the 2016 election, Lee joined the People's United Party (PUP, then Minjung Party), a minor left-wing party formed by several notable ex-UPP members. He was selected as the PUP's MP candidate for Gwanak 2nd, but ended up with 1.91%. After that, he shortly left politics and worked as a plumber, till returned to help the party's presidential candidate Kim Sun-dong at the 2017 presidential election.

In 2018, Lee announced his bid for Seoul mayorship. In fact, he showed his intention to run in 2010 but endorsed Han Myeong-sook. He lost to Kim Jin-sook in preselection.

On 26 August 2018, Lee was elected as the Permanent President of the Minjung Party, received 96%.

== Controversy ==
On 22 May 2012, Lee was questioned by an audience in MBC 100 Minutes Debate, to explain his position and opinion about the issues regarding North Korea i.e. human rights and nuclear. He replied that the question has a problem, adding that people should look the exact appearance of the country. This was criticised by Chin Jung-kwon, saying "All politicians should ensure their ideologies and orientations to the voters. Otherwise, he or she is not supposed to take any duties."

== Personal life ==
Lee married to Kim Hyang-soo, who is 15 years younger than him. Both have 3 children.

== Election results ==
=== General elections ===
Year	Elections	Constituency	Political party	Votes (%)	Remarks
2008	18th National Assembly General Election	PR (8th)	DLP	973,445 (5.68%)	Not elected
2010	2010 By-election	Eunpyeong B (Seoul)	DLP		Withdrawn
2012	19th National Assembly General Election	Gwanak B (Seoul)	UPP	43,158 (38.24%)	Won
2015	2015 By-election	Gwanak B (Seoul)	Independent		Withdrawn
2016	20th National Assembly General Election	Gwanak B (Seoul)	PUP	2,354 (1.91%)	Defeated (4th)
2020	21st National Assembly General Election	PR (4th)	Minjung	295,612 (1.05%)	Not elected
2024	22nd National Assembly General Election	Gwanak B (Seoul)	Progressive	4,050 (3.18%)	Defeated (3rd)

=== Local elections ===
==== Seoul Guro District Council ====
Year	Elections	Constituency	Political party	Votes (%)	Remarks
1995	1st Iocal Election	Seoul Guro Sindorim-dong	Independent	2,484 (43.12%)	Defeated (2nd)

==== Seoul Metropolitan Council ====
Year	Elections	Constituency	Political party	Votes (%)	Remarks
2002	3rd Iocal Election	Seoul Guro 2nd	DLP	3,369 (8.01%)	Defeated (3rd)
