= Kim Jae-yeon (politician) =

South Korean politician (born 1980)

- 김재연
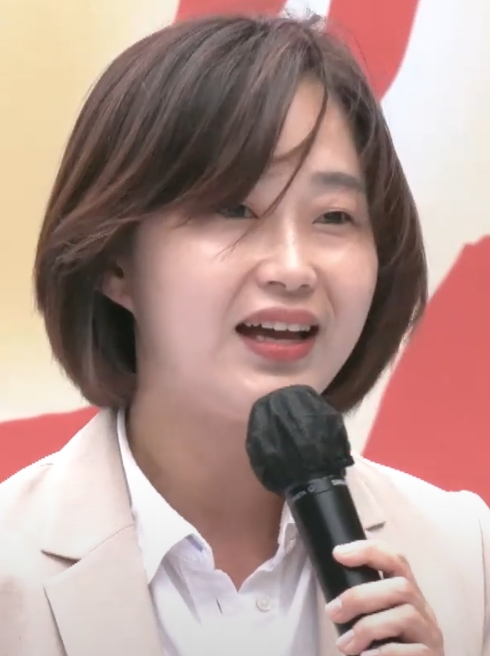

Leader of the Progressive Party
- In office 15 June 2024 – 24 July 2026
- Preceded by: Yoon Hee-suk
- Succeeded by: Kim Jong-hoon
- In office 20 June 2020 – 31 July 2022
- Preceded by: Lee Sang-kyu
- Succeeded by: Yoon Hee-suk

Member of the National Assembly
- In office 30 May 2012 – 19 December 2014
- Constituency: Proportional

Personal details
- Born: 30 October 1980 (age 46) Daegu, South Korea
- Party: Progressive
- Other political affiliations: DLP (2006–2011); UPP (2011–2014); PUP (2016–2017); Minjung (2017–2020)
- Spouse: Choi Ho-hyun (m. 2010; died 2023)
- Education: Hankuk University of Foreign Studies
- Occupation: Activist, politician

Korean name
- Hangul: 김재연
- RR: Gim Jaeyeon
- MR: Kim Chaeyŏn

Kim Jae-yeon (Korean: 김재연; born 30 October 1980) is a South Korean politician and former activist who has served as the leader of the Progressive Party from 2020 to 2022 and since 2024. She was a member of the National Assembly from 2012 to 2014 and the Progressive Party's presidential candidate during the 2022 South Korean presidential election.

A former activist, she joined and led various social activities. Being similar to Lee Jung-hee, she was often known as "the other Lee". However, right-wing critics have criticized her soft stance on North Korea and denounced her as "pro-North Korea".

== Early life and education ==
Kim Jae-yeon was born as a daughter of a conservative family in Daegu but moved to Seoul for secondary education. She joined MBC Children Choir during primary Form 4.

She was educated at Daeil Foreign Language High School. However, in an interview with the left-leaning Voice of the People, she revealed that she did not study properly as a protest against the high school's "competitive" system, adding that the high school was what her parents wanted. She also continued that she rather wrote several poems and fell in love with student activism.

Following the graduation, she attended Hankuk University of Foreign Studies in 1999 where she studied Russian.

== Career ==
She began her activist career in 2000, when the demolition of the shooting range of Maehyang-ri (owned by United States Forces Korea) had become an issue. In 2002, she was elected the President of the Student Council of her university. The same year, she ran for the presidency of the South Korean Federation of University Students Councils (SKFUSC), a notable left-leaning student organisation in South Korea, but lost. She was a reformist with in the organisation.

Due to this career, she and other members were wanted by the government for three years. However, she later revealed that she was never arrested as police are not allowed to enter the campus. She was first detained by police in November 2004 for leading a protest for the abolishment of the National Security Act in front of the National Assembly Proceeding Hall.

=== Political career ===
In 2006, she joined the Democratic Labour Party (DLP) and was subsequently appointed the Deputy Spokesperson, as well as the Director of the Student Organisation.

Prior to the 2008 election, the DLP faced an internal conflict and the dissidents including Sim Sang-jung left the party and formed the New Progressive Party (NPP). In order to overcome its hardship, the party brought a decision to put as many candidates for constituencies as possible. As no candidates were in Gangnam District, Seoul, Kim registered for Gangnam 2nd constituency to be "rooted" in the area. She received approximately 4.9% and was not elected.

Following the defeat, she briefly returned as an activist amid the US beef protest. In 2011, she served as the President of the Commission of 21C Korea College Students' Union.

=== Member of the National Assembly ===
On 12 March 2012, prior to the 2012 election, Kim was selected the 3rd list of the Unified Progressive Party (UPP), defeating Kim Ji-yoon. She was elected to the National Assembly, making her as the first MP graduated from foreign language school in South Korean history.

From 9 to 28 November, she visited nine universities, including Jeonbuk National University, Pusan National University and Korea University. In Chungbuk National University, she received requests from students to change the old chairs and desks, as well as enhancing the air conditioning and heating systems. She then sent these requests to the Chancellor. Some students gave positive and supportive responds.

On 20 January 2013, Kim suggested an amendment of the Income Tax Act that includes religious taxation. On 22 February, during the hearing session of the Deputy Prime Minister-nominee Hyun Oh-seok, she revealed that Hyun had acquired a master's degree in public administration at Seoul National University during the national service. On 5 September, she was appointed the spokesperson of the UPP, formerly solely served by Hong Sung-kyu.

On 6 November, the UPP MPs including Kim, shaved their heads as a sign of protest against the Government's suggestion to ban and dissolve their parties, suggested by the then Justice Minister Hwang Kyo-ahn. Soon, they also launched an indefinite hunger strike. 15 days later, she was brought to a hospital. Despite their protests, the Constitutional Court ordered the dissolution and prohibition of the party on 19 December 2014, in which the elections of its all MPs were nullified.

=== Post-MP career ===
Following her removal as an MP, she opened an AfreecaTV account on 25 August 2015.

On 20 March 2016, prior to the 2016 election, she joined the newly formed People's United Party (PUP), which was denounced as "another UPP" by critics. She ran for Uijeongbu 2nd constituency but lost. In the end of the year, she opened a bookshop named Bookshop of Life.

In December 2017, following the PUP's merger with the New People's Party (NPP) into the Minjung Party, she was appointed the spokesperson. In February 2020, she was again selected the Minjung candidate for Uijeongbu 2nd constituency at the 2020 election, but came behind of Kim Min-chul and Lee Hyung-seop.

=== Leader of the Progressive Party ===
On 20 June 2020, Kim was elected the Leader of the Minjung Party, following the resignation of the predecessor Lee Sang-kyu. The party also changed its name to the Progressive Party.

== Political positions ==
=== Education ===
Kim is a supporter of full free education, from kindergarten to university. In 2007, she said that should the then President Roh Moo-hyun purchased at least 6% of the education budget, at least 70% students can be educated freely. She also advocates an interest-free student loans.

=== LGBT rights ===
In April 2013, she was one of MPs suggested the Anti-discrimination Law to the National Assembly. The law prohibits discrimination against minorities such as LGBT people, immigrants, and women. Though the law was advocated by LGBT activists, those on the Christian right harshly criticised the law. Two DUP MPs — Kim Han-gil and Choi Won-shik, who also suggested the law — withdrew their decisions.

In January 2018, she publicly supported a TV programme Candid Men and Women for broadcasting issues related to LGBT rights.

=== North Korea ===
Since her MP career, right-leaning critics have been denouncing her as "pro-North Korea".

On 4 June 2012 during an interview with KBS, the emcee asked her to confirm her view towards North Korea. She answered, "If a person does not want to recognise North Korean regime, it means that he/she wants a war with them". When the emcee also asked about what if North Korea attacks the South, she replied, "Still, we should not fight back."

== Personal life ==
Kim met Choi Ho-hyun, the founder of the Capitalism Research Society, in 2009. Both then married in March 2010. She was arrested by police in April 2011 for owning approximately 90 books praising Kim Il Sung and Kim Jong Il, such as With the Century. According to police, she also shared the book to her fellow party members in September 2007. She had also previously visited Venezuela and Cuba. In February 2017, she revealed that her husband was studying in Germany. Her husband died on 22 April 2023.

== Electoral results ==
Year	Elections	Constituency	Political party	Votes (%)	Remarks
2008	18th National Assembly General Election	Gangnam B (Seoul)	DLP	4,535 (4.93%)	Defeated (5th)
2012	19th National Assembly General Election	PR (3rd)	UPP	2,198,082 (10.30%)	Elected
2016	20th National Assembly General Election	Uijeongbu B (Gyeonggi)	PUP	3,810 (3.76%)	Defeated (4th)
2020	21st National Assembly General Election	Uijeongbu B (Gyeonggi)	Minjung	5,536 (4.33%)	Defeated (3rd)
2022	2022 Presidential Election	South Korea	Progressive	37,366 (0.11%)	Defeated (5th)
2026	2026 By-election	Pyeongtaek B (Gyeonggi)	Progressive	2,844 (2.95%)	Defeated (5th)
