= Kim Jong-hoon (politician, born 1964) =

South Korean politician (born 1964)

- 김종훈
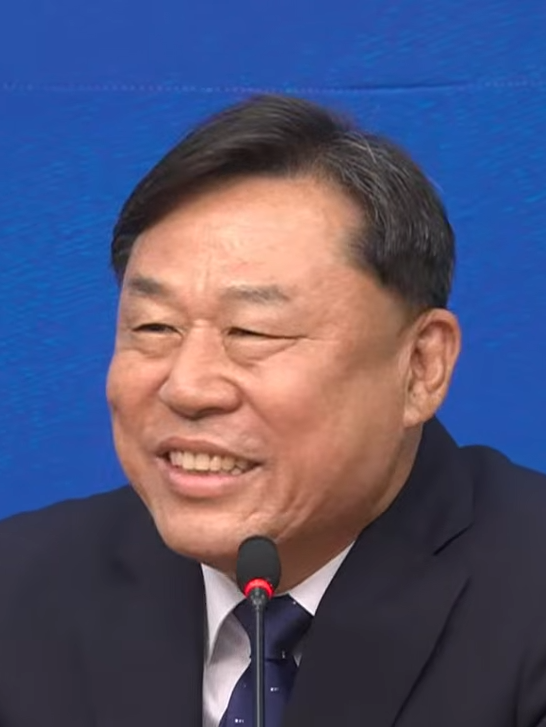
- Kim in 2026

Leader of the Progressive Party
- Incumbent
- Assumed office 24 July 2026
- Preceded by: Kim Jae-yeon

Member of the National Assembly
- In office 30 May 2016 – 29 May 2020
- Constituency: Ulsan Dong-gu

Leader of the New People's Party
- In office 3 September 2017 – 15 October 2017
- Preceded by: Ahn Hyo-dae

Floor Leader of the Minjung Party
- In office 22 December 2017 – 29 May 2020
- Preceded by: Yoon Jong-o

Personal details
- Born: 3 July 1964 (age 62) Gyeongju, North Gyeongsang Province, South Korea
- Party: Minjung Party
- Other political affiliations: New People's Party (2017) Independent (2014–2016); Unified Progressive Party (2011–2014) Democratic Labor Party (2002–2011)
- Education: University of Ulsan

Korean name
- Hangul: 김종훈
- Hanja: 金鍾勳
- RR: Gim Jonghun
- MR: Kim Chonghun

Kim Jong-hoon (Korean: 김종훈; Hanja: 金鍾勳; born 3 July 1964) is a South Korean politician. He is the current leader of the Progressive Party. He was the only Minjung Party member in the National Assembly, and hence Floor leader, until he lost his seat in the 2020 elections.

== Early life and education ==
Kim Jong-hoon was born on July 3, 1964. He graduated from Ulsan University.

== Political career ==
=== Member of Ulsan Metropolitan Council and Mayor (2002–2011) ===
Kim was elected as a member to the Ulsan Metropolitan Council in 2002 as a member of the Democratic Labor Party.

During the 18th South Korean legislative election in 2008, he planned to run for the Ulsan Dong-gu constituency, but withdrew is candidacy and endorsed Noh Ok-hee of the New Progressive Party.

He became the mayor of Dong-gu in 2011 through snap elections that were held for the position.

=== Representative of Dong-gu district (2016–present) ===
After the dissolution of the Unified Progressive Party in 2014, Kim was an independent. He later ran in the 20th South Korean legislative election in 2016 as an independent and was elected representative of Dong-gu.

In 2017, along with Yoon Jong-o, Kim established the New People's Party in an attempt to unite progressive politicians in South Korea. He served as the leader of the New People's Party until its merger with the People's United Party. On December 22, 2017, he became the Floor Leader of the Minjung Party after Yoon Jong-o became involved in an election fraud scandal. He has announced that he will be running for representative of Dong-gu in the upcoming 2020 South Korean legislative election, which he later lost.

== Personal life ==
Kim is not married nor does he have any children. He is the author of two books. His hobbies include watching soccer and hiking.

== Election results ==
Year	Elections	Constituency	Political party	Votes (%)	Results
2002	3rd Iocal Election	Ulsan Dong 3rd (Ulsan Metroplitan Council)	DLP	9,313 (38.81%)	Won
2006	4th Iocal Election	Mayor of Ulsan Dong	DLP	18,622 (24.83%)	Defeated (2nd)
2010	5th Iocal Election	Mayor of Ulsan Dong	DLP	36,550 (48.66%)	Defeated (2nd)
2011	2011 By-election	Mayor of Ulsan Dong	DLP	29,561 (47.30%)	Won
2014	6th Iocal Election	Mayor of Ulsan Dong	UPP	33,428 (40.44%)	Defeated (2nd)
2016	20th National Assembly General Election	Dong (Ulsan)	Independent	52,396 (58.88%)	Won
2020	21st National Assembly General Election	Dong (Ulsan)	Minjung	29,889 (33.88%)	Defeated (2nd)
2022	8th Iocal Election	Mayor of Ulsan Dong	Progressive	36,699 (54.83%)	Won
2026	9th Iocal Election	Ulsan (Mayoral Elections)	Progressive	–	Resigned

== Controversy ==
On April 15, 2016, former representative of Dong-gu; Ahn Hyo-dae reported Kim for election fraud to the Supreme Prosecutors' Office of the Republic of Korea. All charges against Kim were later dropped.
