= Kang Sung-hee (politician) =

South Korean politician (born 1972)

- 강성희
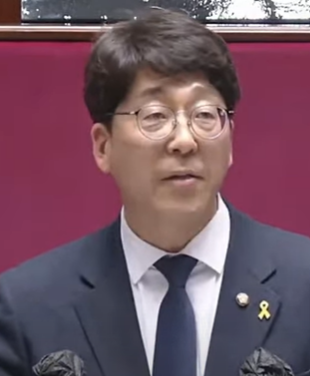
- Kang in 2023

Member of the National Assembly
- In office 6 April 2023 – 29 May 2024
- Preceded by: Lee Sang-jik
- Succeeded by: Lee Seong-yoon
- Constituency: Jeonju B (North Jeolla)

Floor Leader of the Progressive Party
- In office 6 April 2023 – 29 May 2024
- Preceded by: Office established
- Succeeded by: Yoon Jong-oh

Personal details
- Born: 7 September 1972 (age 54) Seoul, South Korea
- Party: Progressive Party
- Education: Hankuk University of Foreign Studies

Korean name
- Hangul: 강성희
- Hanja: 姜聖熙
- RR: Gang Seonghui
- MR: Kang Sŏnghŭi

Kang Sung-hee (Korean: 강성희; Hanja: 姜聖熙; born 7 September 1972) is a South Korean politician and labour activist who was the floor leader of the Progressive Party from 2023 to 2024. He was a member of the 21st National Assembly representing the Jeonju B constituency.

== Early life and early career ==
Kang was born 7 September 1972, in Seoul, South Korea. He attended Whimoon High School and later studied at Hankuk University of Foreign Studies; graduating with a bachelor's degree in linguistics. After graduating, he worked at a Hyundai Motors' manufacturing plant located in Jeonju. There, he served as the President of the Hyundai Motors contracted workers branch of the Korean Confederation of Trade Unions. As branch President, he successfully assisted in converting many contracted worker positions at Hyundai Motors to full-time positions. He also served as a senior branch manager at the Korean Metal Workers' Union.

== Election results ==
=== General elections ===
Year	Elections	Constituency	Political party	Votes (%)	Results
2023	2023 By-election	Jeonju B (North Jeolla)	Progressive	17,382 (39.07%)	Won
2024	22nd National Assembly General Election	Jeonju B (North Jeolla)	Progressive	12,828 (11.50%)	Defeated (3rd)

=== Local elections ===
==== Mayor of Jeonju ====
Year	Elections	Constituency	Political party	Votes (%)	Remarks
2026	9th Iocal Election	Mayor of Jeonju	Progressive	68,252 (22.34%)	Defeated (2nd)

==== North Jeolla Wanju Council ====
Year	Elections	Constituency	Political party	Votes (%)	Remarks
2014	6th Iocal Election	North Jeolla Wanju 3rd	UPP	1,678 (11.35%)	Defeated (5th)

== Political career ==
Kang ran as the left-wing Unified Progressive Party's candidate in the Wanju County Council election during the 2014 South Korean local elections, but was unsuccessful in being elected.

He ran as the Progressive Party's candidate for a by-election held for the Jeonju B constituency of the National Assembly. He won the election with 39 percent of the vote, becoming the Progressive Party's first National Assembly member.

=== Alleged assault by Kim Yong-hyun ===
PD Note's coverage on the incident

On 18 January 2024, Kang Sung-hee. the floor leader of the Progressive Party, was forcefully carried out and removed by presidential security agents at a ceremony launching North Jeolla Province as a special self-governing province after verbally urging President Yoon to "change [his] approach to governance." Footage of the incident shows Kim Yong-hyun, then-Chief of the Presidential Security Service, raising his hand and making a gesture as if he was physically striking Kang. Whether or not Kim actually assaulted Kang is unknown. Kang later attempted to re-enter but was again stopped by security guards. Footage of the gesture went viral and sparked mass controversy. The Progressive Party announced they would "hold Yoon's administration accountable" for the incident. Rep. Jeong Seong-ho would call the incident "inappropriate" and would claim Yoon Suk Yeol's administration is "worst than Park Geun-hye's administration," in reference to President Park Geun-hye and scandals involving her administration. Democratic Party leader Lee Jae Myung would call Yoon Suk Yeol's administration a "monarchy" in response to the incident.
