= Kim Hui-chul =

South Korean politician (born 1947)

- 김희철

Member of the National Assembly
- In office 30 May 2008 – 29 May 2012
- Preceded by: Lee Hae-chan
- Succeeded by: Lee Sang-kyu
- Constituency: Gwanak B (Seoul)

Mayor of Gwanak
- In office 1 July 1998 – 30 June 2006
- Preceded by: Chin Jin-hyung
- Succeeded by: Kim Hyo-kyum

Personal details
- Born: 15 December 1947 (age 78) Gochang, North Jeolla, southern Korea
- Citizenship: South Korean
- Party: Democratic
- Other political affiliations: Peace Democratic Party (1987–1991); New Democratic Unionist Party (1991); Democratic Party (1991–1995); National Congress for New Politics (1995–2000); Millennium Democratic Party (2000–2005); Democratic Party (2005–2008); United Democratic Party (2008); Democratic Party (2008–2011); Democratic Unionist Party (2011–2012); Independent (2012–2014); New Politics Alliance for Democracy (2014–2015); Independent (2015–2016); People's Party (2016–2018); Bareunmirae (2018); Independent (2018); Democracy and Peace (2018–2019); Independent (2019–2020); New Alternatives (2020); Minsaeng (2020); Independent (2020)
- Education: Konkuk University
- Occupation: Politician

Kim Hui-chul (Korean: 김희철, born 15 December 1947) is a South Korean politician. He was the former Mayor of Gwanak District (1998–2006), as well as the Member of National Assembly for Gwanak 2nd constituency (2008–2012).

== Career ==
Born in Gochang, Kim attended to Gochang High School in 1966. He earned a bachelor's degree in political diplomacy, as well as a master's degree and a doctorate in public administration from Konkuk University.

He joined the Peace Democratic Party in 1987, and worked as an aide for MP Han Kwang-ok. In 1998, he was elected as the Mayor of Gwanak, and won again in 2002. He lost to Kim Hyo-kyum in 2006.

Prior to the 2008 election, Kim was selected as the United Democratic Party's candidate for Gwanak 2nd constituency, after the incumbent Lee Hae-chan did not seek re-election. He defeated Kim Cheol-soo of the ruling Grand National Party.

Kim announced his bid for re-election in 2012, and was selected as the candidate of the Democratic Unionist Party (DUP). However, DUP agreed to put unity candidates with the Unified Progressive Party (UPP) in some constituencies, including Gwanak 2nd. In the opposition preselection, he lost to the UPP's co-President Lee Jung-hee. Shortly after, he left DUP and declared to run as an independent candidate, citing that the preselection was rigged. Lee Jung-hee was forced to withdraw, making Lee Sang-kyu to replace her. In the end, Kim received 28.47%, came behind to Lee Sang-kyu (UPP) and Oh Shin-hwan (Saenuri).

The UPP was banned by the court order on 19 December 2014, in which the elections of its all MPs were nullified. Kim contested NPAD preselection, but lost to Chung Tae-ho. He then left NPAD along with the party's dissidents and formed the People's Party (PP). He also lost to Lee Haeng-ja in the PP preselection prior to the 2016 election.

Kim quitted PP in February 2018, and joined Party for Democracy and Peace. He tried to come back as the Mayor of Gwanak in the year but ended up with 6.16%, far behind of Park Joon-hui (DPK).

== Election results ==
=== General elections ===
Year	Elections	Constituency	Political party	Votes (%)	Remarks
2008	18th National Assembly General Election	Gwanak B (Seoul)	UDP	43,235 (46.50%)	Won
2012	19th National Assembly General Election	Gwanak B (Seoul)	Independent	32,127 (28.47%)	Defeated

=== Local elections ===
==== Mayor of Gwanak ====
Year	Elections	Constituency	Political party	Votes (%)	Remarks
1998	2nd Iocal Election	Mayor of Gwanak	NCNP	102,629 (56.54%)	Won
2002	3rd Iocal Election	Mayor of Gwanak	MDP	95,897 (53.13%)	Won
2006	4th Iocal Election	Mayor of Gwanak	DP	69,552 (33.41%)	Defeated
2018	7th Iocal Election	Mayor of Gwanak	PDP	16,031 (6.16%)	Defeated
