= Parliamentary immunity =

Legal protection from prosecution for legislators

Parliamentary immunity, also known as legislative immunity, is a system in which politicians or other political leaders are granted full immunity from legal prosecution, both civil prosecution and criminal prosecution, in the course of the execution of their official duties. Advocates of parliamentary immunity suggest the doctrine is necessary to keep a check on unauthorised use of power of the judiciary, to maintain judicial accountability, and to promote the health of democratic institutions. The prosecution of former heads of government has increased globally since 2000.

== Westminster system countries ==
Legislators in countries using the Westminster system, such as the United Kingdom, are protected from civil action and criminal law for slander and libel by parliamentary immunity whilst they are in the House. This protection is part of the privileges afforded the Houses of Parliament under parliamentary privileges. Parliamentary immunity from criminal prosecution is not enjoyed by Members of Parliament under the Westminster system. This lack of criminal immunity is derived from the key tenet of the British Constitution that all are equal before the law.

== Brazil ==
The Constitution of Brazil (1988) grants parliamentary immunity to members of both the Chamber of Deputies and the Senate. Unlike other countries, Brazilian parliamentary immunity is also extended to crimes committed outside a parliamentarian's official duties (murder, theft, etc.). This does not apply for crimes committed before the member of parliament takes office. Members of parliament can be arrested only for crimes if caught at the time of the criminal act in flagrante for a crime with no possibility of bail. These arrests can be overruled by a floor vote of the particular parliament chamber that parliamentarian belongs to.

Criminal proceedings may be suspended for crimes committed only after a parliamentarian begins his term of office, and requests for suspensions need to be approved by majority of members of Parliament. Members of the National Congress as well as other high level politicians are prosecuted and judged exclusively by the Supreme Court, as opposed to the lower courts. As of 2007, no Brazilian politician has ever been convicted by the Supreme Federal Tribunal of any crime since parliamentary immunity was instituted in 1988. After the Mensalão scandal in 2005, the Supreme Federal Tribunal surprised many when, on August 24, 2007, it accepted the indictments of 40 individuals, most of which are former or current federal deputies, all of which were allies of Brazilian president Luiz Inácio Lula da Silva.

== France ==
Members of the Parliament of France enjoy irresponsibility for what they did as parliamentarians, and partial inviolability – that is, severe restrictions for the police or justice to arrest or detain them. Both irresponsibility and inviolability are mandated by article 26 of the Constitution of France. These dispositions are somewhat controversial, following abuse of such privileges.

== Georgia ==
The Constitution of Georgia states: "The arrest or detention of a Member of Parliament, or searches of his/her place of residence, place of work, vehicle or person, shall be permitted only with the prior consent of Parliament, except when a Member of Parliament is caught at the crime scene, in which case Parliament shall be notified immediately. Unless Parliament consents to the detention within 48 hours, the arrested or detained Member of Parliament shall be released immediately."

== Germany ==
Article 46 of Germany's Constitution states: "At no time may a Member be subjected to court proceedings or disciplinary action or otherwise called to account outside the Bundestag for a vote cast or for any speech or debate in the Bundestag or in any of its committees," with exceptions made for "defamatory insults." It also states that "a Member may not be called to account or arrested for a punishable offence without permission of the Bundestag unless he is apprehended while committing the offence or in the course of the following day." Furthermore, the Bundestag may also order that a detainment or prosecution of a member be suspended. The states of Germany also have similar procedures for their legislative bodies.

== Greece ==
Members of the Hellenic Parliament are immune from criminal prosecution, arrest or detention while in office, with the exception of crimes committed in flagrante delicto. They are also immune from having to provide any information to any authority regarding their legislative functions and deliberations. However, both the Constitution and the Standing Orders allow for the Public Prosecutor's Office to request from Parliament to lift an MP's immunity for a particular crime, with MPs deciding through open balloting. Alleged crimes committed by members of the Cabinet (including non-MPs) or the President of the Republic are first investigated by an ad hoc parliamentary committee, with MPs then voting on the committee's recommendations. Should parliament determine that there is sufficient evidence for prosecution, an ad hoc Special Court is set up.

== Italy ==
Parliamentary immunity in Italy was re-instated in 1948 by the Constituent Assembly to prevent cases such as "Francesco Saverio Nitti, whose house was searched and ransacked by the fascist police in the fall of 1923; Giacomo Matteotti, murdered by fascists on 10 June 1924 for his work as a deputy of opposition; Giovanni Amendola, beaten in Montecatini in 1925 and died in Cannes in April 1926; Antonio Gramsci, whose parliamentary mandate was revoked on 9 November 1926 and who was tried in 1928 by a special court for his activities as a Member of Parliament and as a political opponent. The same court had him imprisoned and his correspondence was seized." Immunity was limited in 1993; however, abuse continues by means of denying authorizations to certain judiciary acts, such as wiretapping. As a result, in the final judgment, the Constitutional Court often overturns the decisions of Parliament to protect its members, authorising the activities of the judiciary.

== Portugal ==
Parliamentary immunity in Portugal is provided for in the Constitution of the Portuguese Republic and aims to protect MPs in the exercise of their duties, guaranteeing them independence and autonomy from possible pressure or reprisals, through a two-tiered immunity:

- Inviolability: Members of Parliament cannot be held responsible for the opinions they express or the votes they cast in the exercise of their duties. This immunity is absolute and permanent, meaning that it applies even after their mandate has ended.
- Procedural immunity: Members of Parliament may not be subjected to arrest, pre-trial detention or any measure depriving them of their liberty without the authorisation of the Assembly of the Republic, except in cases of flagrante delicto for a crime punishable by a prison sentence of more than three years.

=== Waiving of Immunity ===
Parliamentary immunity can be waived in certain circumstances, following a specific procedure:

1. Request to Lift Immunity: this can be requested by the Public Ministry or by a judge in the context of legal proceedings, which is addressed President of the Assembly of the Republic, who forwards it to the Ethics Committee.
2. Ethics Committee: the Assembly of the Republic's Ethics, Rights and Guarantees Commission analyses the request. The Committee assesses whether the request is legally founded and is not an attempt at political persecution. Upon said analysis the committee draws up an opinion which is then submitted to the plenary of the Assembly.
3. Plenary decision: the plenary of the Assembly of the Republic votes on the opinion of the Ethics Commission. Immunity is only lifted if the majority of deputies present vote in favour. If the plenary approves the lifting of immunity, the MP may be subject to legal proceedings and coercive measures.

=== Exemptions ===
Parliamentary immunity does not prevent a member of parliament from being investigated or the judicial process from going ahead. It only protects the MP from being arrested or detained without the due authorisation of the Assembly of the Republic, except in situations of flagrante delicto for serious crimes.

=== Autonomous Regions ===
Parliamentary immunity in the Autonomous Regions of the Azores and Madeira in Portugal follows similar principles to those applied to members of the Assembly of the Republic, but adapted to the context of the regional Legislative Assemblies. This immunity is regulated by the respective Political-Administrative statutes of the Autonomous Regions and by the Constitution of the Portuguese Republic.

== South Korea ==
Legislative immunity in South Korea was established in the 1987 Constitution, which ended nearly 30 years of military dictatorship following pro-democracy movements. The Constitution grants lawmakers two types of immunity: immunity from arrest and detention and immunity from criminal and civil liabilities for speeches made during sessions or votes cast in the Assembly. According to Article 44 of the Constitution, members of the National Assembly cannot be arrested or detained during legislative sessions unless the Assembly approves it or the member is caught in the act of committing a crime (i.e., caught in flagrante delicto). Article 44 was established in response to South Korea’s long history of dictatorial regimes detaining legislators to prevent them from voting in a way that the President might disagree with or to check the President’s powers.

While Article 44 specifically addresses arrests and detentions, Article 45 immunizes members of the National Assembly against criminal and civil liabilities for opinions officially expressed or for votes cast in the Assembly. However, unlike presidential immunity, which shields the president from criminal charges while in office, legislative immunity does not protect legislators from criminal charges for conducts that fall outside of Article 45, even during legislative sessions. Most notably in 2013, the arrest motion of Assemblyman Lee Seok-ki—suspected of plotting with several members of his party to overthrow the government if a war broke out with North Korea—was submitted to the National Assembly. The motion passed, leading to Lee's arrest, indictment, trial, and conviction.

== Spain ==
In Spain, parliamentarians in the national Congress of Deputies and senators as well as legislators serving in regional administrations and certain members of the Spanish royal family are afforded 'Aforos', thus becoming 'aforados' (lit. 'afforded ones') and enjoy privileges granted in the Constitution of Spain. These self-regulatory organizations' membership privileges are reflected in the following parliamentary prerogatives:

- Inviolability: Legislators can not be judicially prosecuted for opinions expressed or votes cast in the exercise of their official duties (Article 71.1 of the Spanish Constitution of 1978).
- Immunity: Legislators may only be detained in flagrante delicto, and so plaintiffs and prosecutors must seek authorisation from the assembly in which the accused is elected before any legal process is initiated (Article 71.2 of the Spanish Constitution of 1978). although the final authority rests with the Supreme Court of Spain
- Specific jurisdiction: Parliamentarians can only be judged in the first instance by the Supreme Court, a practice that has been criticised as potentially undermining any right of appeal to a higher court.

There are 10,000 persons in Spain with parliamentary immunity, and only a fifth of them are politicians.

== Turkey ==
Between 26 October 1961 and 12 March 1998 Turkish prosecutors made 2,713 requests to suspend the immunity of 1,151 deputies. Only 29 requests were granted. Six of these were the deputies of the Democracy Party arrested in 1994 because of their openly support for the Kurdistan Workers' Party (PKK) and separatist activities like the one as Leyla Zana wore a napkin in the Kurdish colors red, green, yellow. In connection with the Ergenekon trials (from 2008), some accused have been selected as parliamentary candidates specifically to give them legal protection via parliamentary immunity.

On 20 May 2016, an amendment to the Constitution has been passed by the Parliament, removing parliamentary immunity for the existing requests for removal of immunity. Due to surpassing the two-thirds majority threshold, a provisional amendment was able to pass without a constitutional referendum. In November of the same year, nine members of parliament of the Peoples Democratic Party (HDP) were arrested. On the 4 June 2020 another three Turkish MPs were dismissed from parliament and arrested, two from the HDP and one from the Republican People's Party (CHP).

== Ukraine ==
Article 80 of the Ukrainian Constitution states that parliamentary immunity is guaranteed to the peoples' deputies of Ukraine. The peoples' deputies of Ukraine do not have legal responsibility for their votes and opinions in parliament and its appendant bodies, except for responsibility for insult or defamation.

== United States ==
Mason's Manual notes, "The courts, by a series of decisions, have explained away almost every essential feature of the privilege from arrest as it once existed...A member of the legislature has no right to physically resist an officer attempting to make an arrest to the extent of assaulting such officer." Members of the United States Congress enjoy a similar parliamentary privilege as members of the British Parliament; that is, they cannot be prosecuted for anything they say on the floor of the House or Senate. They also enjoy the right to be present in Congress: that is, they may be in prison or jail the rest of the time, but they have the right to attend congressional sessions, speak on the floor, vote, etc. These rights are specified in the Constitution and have been fairly uncontroversial in U.S. history. Courts have consistently interpreted them very narrowly. Several state constitutions provided equivalent protections for members of state legislatures.

== Vietnam ==
National Assembly deputies and delegates of the People's Council are protected from being arrested and prosecuted. National Assembly deputies cannot be dismissed or sacked by the agency, organization or unit where the deputy works. These protections can be revoked by the National Assembly (usually as approval from the Standing Committee) or the People's Council (local legislatures), respectively.

LAW ON ORGANIZATION OF THE NATIONAL ASSEMBLY

Article 37. The right to immunity of National Assembly deputies

1. No National Assembly deputy may be arrested, held in custody, detained, prosecuted or have his/her place of residence or workplace searched, unless so consented by the National Assembly or, when the National Assembly is in recess, by the Standing Committee of the National Assembly. The proposal to arrest, put in custody, detain or prosecute a National Assembly deputy or to search his/her place of residence and workplace must fall under the jurisdiction of the Procurator General of the Supreme People’s Procuracy.

In case a National Assembly deputy is taken into custody for a flagrant offense, the agency holding the deputy in custody shall immediately report the case to the National Assembly or its Standing Committee for consideration and decision.

2. No National Assembly deputy may be removed from office, dismissed, forced to resign or sacked by the agency, organization or unit where he/she works, unless so consented by the Standing Committee of the National Assembly.

LAW ON ORGANIZATION OF LOCAL GOVERNMENT

Article 100. Immunities of delegates of the People’s Council

1. Delegates of the People’s Council shall not be subjected to imprisonment, custody, detention, prosecution, or house or office search within the meeting of the People’s Council, or without consent from the People’s Council or the Standing Committee of the People’s Council.

2. In case delegates of the People’s Council is temporarily suspended because of criminals caught in the act, the detaining authority must immediately report to the People’s Council or the Standing Committee of the People’s Council for consideration and decision.

== See also ==
- Legal immunity
- Political prisoner
- Sovereign immunity
