= 2013 South Korean sabotage plot =

2013 plot by South Korean lawmakers to overthrow the government

Lee Seok-ki being arrested for the sabotage plot in 2013

In August 2013, South Korea's spy agency, the National Intelligence Service (NIS), accused Lee Seok-ki, a lawmaker from the leftist Unified Progressive Party (UPP), of plotting to overthrow the country's government if war broke out with North Korea. He was alleged by NIS to have led a secret meeting in May 2013 of 130 members of his party aimed at attacking South Korean infrastructure if the heightened tensions between Koreas in the spring of 2013 had led to war.

After further investigation, on 26 September 2013, South Korean prosecutors indicted Lee Seok-ki on charges that he was plotting a pro-North Korea rebellion to overthrow the government, saying his plan posed a "grave" national security threat. On 17 February 2014, he was sentenced to 12 years of prison by a district court although the sentence was reduced to 9 years by the Seoul High Court upon appeal, which was upheld by South Korea's Supreme Court.

On 3 November 2014, following Lee's initial conviction, the government of President Park Geun-hye asked the Constitutional Court of South Korea to disband the UPP. The Constitutional Court disbanded the party on 18 December 2014 and stripped Lee and four other lawmakers of their seats in the National Assembly.

== Investigation and legal proceedings ==
=== The National Intelligence Service's (NIS) investigation ===
"The National Intelligence Service carried out detailed investigations into this case for the past three years and confirmed Representative Lee Seok-ki is suspected of assisting the national enemy and conspiring in a rebellion based on various evidences, such as the testimony of witnesses, the comments Lee made at several secret meetings, confiscated documents and some other materials contained in USB devices," Justice Minister Hwang Kyo-an said during a speech at the National Assembly on 4 September 2013.

The 10 major suspects who had been investigated by NIS are Lee Seok-ki (a lawmaker of the UPP), Woo Wi-young (an ex-spokesman of the UPP), Kim Hong-ryul (the Gyeonggi provincial chairman of the UPP), Kim Keun-rae (a Gyeonggi provincial vice chairman of the UPP), Hong Soon-seok (a Gyeonggi provincial vice chairman of the UPP), Lee Sang-ho (an adviser of Gyeonggi Alliance for Progressive Movement), Lee Young-chun (a Gyeonggi-Paju branch manager of Korean Confederation of Trade Union), Jo Yang-won (the representative of Social Trend Institute), Han Dong-geun (a former Suwon chairman of the UPP), Park Min-jung (a former youth chairman of the UPP). NIS had acquired court approvals for wiretapping and had been collecting a wide range of evidence by closely monitoring the secret meetings of Lee Seok-ki and his colleagues. The NIS is said to have secured recordings of Lee's speech at a meeting of the East Gyeonggi Coalition, the mainstream faction of the UPP.

The NIS investigation focuses on "Revolutionary Organization (RO)," the true nature of which was first informed by an internal whistle blower of the UPP. He, identified only as 40-year-old Mr. Yi, is known to have been one of the core members of the insurgent group. Reports said Mr. Yi had been disappointed by North Korean submarine attack on a South Korean corvette "Cheonanham" in March 2010, and the RO's unconditional loyalty to North Korean regime, and he finally decided to reveal the treason plot and get a 'new life.' He allegedly handed in a USB drive containing the RO's doctrine and goal, members' activities, and materials for ideological study. The NIS was reported to have said that Mr. Yi's statements coincide largely with what was found from the subsequent probe.

On 17 September 2013, the NIS searched and seized the houses of five people: Hong Sung-gyu (spokesman for the UPP), Kim Yang-hyun (Pyeongtaek chairman of the UPP), Kim Seok-young (Ansan Sangrok Gap area chairman of the UPP), Choi Jin-seon (the representative of Hwasung Center for Labour and Human Rights), Yoon Yong-bae (chairman of the organizing committee of the Korea Alliance for Progressive Movements).

On 24 September 2013, the NIS additionally searched and seized the office of Ahn So-hee, a member of Paju city council, for violating the National Security Act.

=== Arrest, search, and seizure ===
On 28 August 2013, agents from the National Intelligence Service raided the homes and offices of an opposition lawmaker, Lee Seok-ki, and other members of a far-left opposition party, detaining three of them on charges of plotting to overthrow the government.

The three persons detained were Hong Soon-seok, a Gyeonggi provincial vice chairman of the UPP; Han Dong-geun, a former Suwon chairman of the UPP; and Lee Sang-ho, an adviser of Gyeonggi Alliance for Progressive Movement. And a total of 14 have been banned from leaving the country.

The NIS agents, who raided Lee Seok-ki's office in the National Assembly with the warrant at 8:10 am, faced resistance of Lee's aides and were able to enter the office only after 20 minutes of struggle. But inside the office, Lee Seok-ki's fellow lawmakers including Kim Mi-hee blocked the door of another Lee's office room until 3:00 pm. Ahead of the raid, Lee's aides are alleged to have shredded documents of unknown content.

Lee Seok-ki was said to appear at 6:58 am, 28 August at his studio apartment at Mapo District, the western part of Seoul, disguised and wearing a cap, and ran away in a cab as soon as he found his place was being searched by investigators. He showed up at the National Assembly Building on the next day with the suspicion that he had already destroyed important evidence. Investigators allegedly seized 57 letters of vowing loyalty to Lee Seok-ki, tap detection equipment, and 91 million won worth of bank notes (approx. $82,700 USD)).

=== The National Assembly's approval for arrest ===
On 2 September 2013, South Korea's National Assembly received the government's arrest motion for lawmaker Lee Seok-ki, signed by President Park Geun-hye. According to the Korean National Assembly Act, the arrest motion should be decided by vote in the plenary session 24 hours after and within 72 hours from the report of the motion. Kang Chang-hee, the speaker of the National Assembly, submitted the proposal of opening plenary session from 2 September to 10 December and put it to a vote, which was the preliminary procedure to pass the arrest motion. The proposal was passed with 255 in favor, 2 against, and 7 abstentions. Kim Mi-hee and Kim Jae-yeon from the UPP opposed the proposal. Seven abstainers, all of whom were from the opposition Democratic Party, were Moon Jae-in, Lee In-young, Kim Yong-ik, Do Jong-hwan, Yu Sung-yeop, Eun Soo-mi, and Lim Soo-kyung. Lee Seok-ki didn't participate in the vote at all.

On 4 September 2013, the South Korean National Assembly overwhelmingly passed a proposal that would lift Lee Seok-ki's legislative immunity against arrest. It is believed to be the first time the assembly has passed such a motion over rebellion charges. The vote was 258 in favor and 14 against, with 11 abstentions and 6 invalid. After the vote the Suwon District Court issued a warrant against Lee Seok-ki, and the arrest was made by the National Intelligent Service in a speedy manner. In executing the warrant at Lee's office in the National Assembly, NIS investigators had nearly an hour-long confrontation with vehemently-resisting UPP members who blocked the path to Lee's Office.

Prior to the National Assembly's vote, Justice Minister Hwang Kyo-an attended the session and explained the reasons of filing the arrest motion against Lee. "Lee Seok-ki organized and led the Revolutionary Organization (RO), a rebel group, the purpose of which was to revolutionize South Korean society with Juche, the guiding ideology of the North Korean state. He plotted a pro-North rebellion by instigating the RO members to make physical and military preparation for war between North and South Korea, and by drawing up riot plans such as destroying the nation's infrastructure.

Minister Hwang declared that Lee Seok-ki committed following three crimes:

1. Rebellion conspiracy: A collusion and an agreement between two or more persons on plans and contents of rebellion crime. According to the judicial precedent of the Supreme Court of Korea, it does not require that a detail plan of action must be conspired to constitute an offense. 2. Instigation of rebellion: Any word or action that promotes or stimulates to commit insurgency. 3. Benefiting enemy, the offense under National Security Act: To praise, inspire, propagate or conform to the activities of anti-government organization while knowing that such an act endangers national security or free democratic basic order.

According to Minister Hwang, the Prosecutor's Office made a decision that Lee Seok-ki and his followers' crime is a clear danger and defiance to the free democratic basic order of the Republic of Korea, after a close analysis of the evidence. Prosecutors also said there are enough grounds for imprisonment of Lee Seok-ki and his accomplices, considering the following facts. The members of RO, a rebellion group, abided by the rules of organizational security. Under the rules they planned and executed detailed security principles and guidelines, such as destroying evidences. It was highly possible for the criminals to obstruct the investigators' activities of identifying the true nature of the RO.

=== Criminal charges and suspicion ===
Lee Seok-ki allegedly called on his colleagues to prepare to conduct a "speedy war" against the South Korean government should Pyongyang issue an order to attack, according to a transcript of his address during their secret meeting in May 2013. Lee, of the minor opposition Unified Progressive Party, was accused of forming an underground pro-North Korean organization and plotting and instigating an armed revolt. The group, known as "RO" is thought to have been formed within the East Gyeonggi Coalition and have around 130 members. The East Gyeonggi Coalition is a left-leaning political group that backs Lee.

According to the request for Lee Seok-ki's arrest submitted to the National Assembly on 2 September 2013, Lee claimed at a meeting of the group in May 2013 that North Korea had effectively declared war and that they should prepare an offensive. "As of 5 March, the North Korean People's Army command declared the armistice agreement invalid. Scrapping the armistice agreement means war. Let's prepare for war throughout the country," Lee is quoted as saying. Lee Seok-ki is also alleged to have called on his "comrades" to collaborate to show "limitless creative thinking" in their attacks. Lee also allegedly told the attendants of his supporters' rally in March 2012 that the National Assembly would become the "frontline for class strife," and that the current political environment would lead to separation of "revolutionary and anti-revolutionary forces."

Lee Seok-ki was reported to have said that the current bipartisan system in South Korea was a result of American colonists' strategy to divide and control South Korea. At a secret meeting held in August 2012 near Seoul area, Lee presented the plan to 'seize power' by making his party the largest opposition party through the 2014 local election and the 2016 general election, and by finally winning the presidential election in 2017.

The RO group allegedly discussed details of how to make preparations to strike the South Korean government and the U.S. military, such as by incapacitating internet networks and infrastructure for oil and gas supplies and other major logistical facilities in the Seoul area.

Specifically, they are known to have conspired to destroy the Hye-hwa branch of Korea Telecom Corporation, the Internet Data Center in Bundang, and the Pyeongtaek distribution base.

Hye-hwa branch of KT is in charge of core telephone business and internet service. If Hye-hwa branch goes wrong, the internet speed in the country can be substantially slower. The "Internet Chaos" of South Korea in 2003 was caused by a server outage in the Hye-hwa branch, paralyzing the nationwide internet service network.

The Internet Data Centre in Bundang is also equipped with various internet server platforms. Even though the IDCs are located separately at various places such as Mapo District, Seon-reung in Seoul, a terrorist attack on even a single IDC can cause serious telecommunication problems.

In Pyeongtaek distribution base, Korea National Oil Corporation maintains a large-scale facilities that store about 6.2 million barrels of oil and liquefied petroleum gas for use in case of national emergency or war. If the base is attacked, a large explosion and fire will seriously damage the storage facilities and nearby area.

In March 2013, when tension rose in Korean peninsula after North Korea vowed to nullify the armistice agreement, Lee Seok-ki allegedly issued "three major guidelines of preparing war" for the members of RO, the insurgent group. The guidelines, which were delivered by regional RO leaders like Hong Soon-seok (a Gyeonggi provincial vice chairman of UPP), are as follows.

1. Build a solidarity organization for emergency as soon as possible. 2. Perform a large-scale propaganda using a crowd of people just like the time when "the Mad Cow Disease riot" hit the nation. 3. Gather information on military facilities such as U.S. Army camps, U.S. radar bases, and power plants.

The leaders of the RO allegedly educated its members the method of destroying criminal evidence. On 8 May 2013, Hong Soon-seok (a Gyeonggi provincial vice chairman of the UPP) gave a guideline to Han Dong-geun (a former Suwon chairman of the UPP), urging him to break and swallow USB drives in case of emergency like investigators' raid. There is also an instruction for escape, under which RO members have to look for a hiding place of their own and always possess 100 thousand Korean won in cash. They were also told to evade the investigators' chase by fleeing and exchanging secret passwords when reconnecting a RO member.

On 5 April 2013, at the office of Suwon Medical Cooperation, Hong Soon-seok and Han Dong-geun had a secret meeting with the RO "cell" members, according to Lee Seok-ki's prior order. At the meeting all the members vowed loyalty to North Korea, watching the North Korean war movie "Wol-mi do island (1982)." The movie makes a hero of the North Korean artillery soldiers stationed in 'Wol-mi do' island, who fought U.N. troops conducting the famous Incheon landing operation during the Korean War.

Lee Seok-ki requested over 80 documents from the government including confidential national defense materials related to the American and the South Korean armed forces. He requested confidential material on the U.S. and South Korean joint strategic response in case of an attack from North Korea. Since Lee was elected as a proportional representative to the National Assembly in April 2012, he requested 84 documents from 10 different government branches, of which 46 were related to military issues and 36 were related to U.S.-South Korea armed forces and relations between Seoul and Washington.

In April 2013, when North Korea was protesting annual joint military drills by South Korea and the U.S., Lee requested from the Defense Ministry materials on Seoul and Washington's joint strategy in case of attack by Pyongyang. He also requested materials on the March 2013 South Korea-U.S. agreement to carry out a joint counterattack in case of any surgical strike on the South from the North, the strength of a counter-provocation plan and details on the military command in such cases of attacks. He looked into what kind of military support was available to the South in case of such an attack, including from U.S. Forces Japan and the Unified Nations Command. He wanted information on who has operational control in times of crisis on the Korean Peninsula and cooperation among the armed forces of South Korea, the United States, and Japan.

Lee Seok-ki had visited North Korea on two different occasions, the South Korean government said on 2 September 2013. Reports said Lee Seok-ki traveled to North Korea to secretly meet with North Korean officials. Any such meeting could link the rebellion plot to North Korea. "Records showed he was at the Mount Kumgang resort on 31 March-1 April 2005 and again on 16–18 March 2007," Unification Ministry spokesman Kim Hyung-suk said. Kim said that Lee went to the scenic mountain on a package tour with members of CN Communications, an advertising company he managed. The spokesman said that during the 2005 trip, Lee Seok-ki was on parole after being released from prison. He had been imprisoned for pro-North Korean activities.

Authorities reportedly found circumstantial evidence, from which it could be inferred that RO members secretly visited North Korea, contacted the North Korean spy agency, and maintained liaison with highly trained reconnaissance agents of the North. "Lee Seok-ki and the RO's core members had worked in the People's Democratic Revolution Party (PDRP). Since PDRP had conducted espionage activities for North Korea receiving orders from it, it is also highly likely that the RO is connected to North Korea in one way or another," the authorities said. Especially the fact that Kim Keun-rae (a Gyeonggi provincial vice chairman of the UPP), Jo Yang-won (the representative of Social Trend Institute), and other RO members had visited North Korea individually or in a group, was presented as strong circumstantial evidence.

The National Intelligence Service found core members of the RO had kept in contact with an unidentified person suspected of being a North Korean spy. The NIS continues to probe into their contact route and the contents of communication among them. Last year they detected Lee Sang-ho (an adviser of Gyeonggi Alliance for Progressive Movement) and Hong Soon-seok (a Gyeonggi provincial vice chairman of the UPP) had made an international calls on a regular basis, using specific public phones in Seoul and Suwon. The NIS tapped those public phones legitimately with warrants issued by the court. As a result, they found Lee Sang-ho and other suspects showed a consistent pattern of behavior: The always sent an e-mail to an unknown G-mail user in the U.S. right after they made an international call to the suspected spy from North. During the phone call, they allegedly mentioned the activities of the RO and had dialogue like "I will send you an e-mail."

The suspected spy, who communicated with the RO members, was also found to have forward the e-mails to China using a sophisticated security tool to evade tracking.

=== Prosecutor's indictment ===
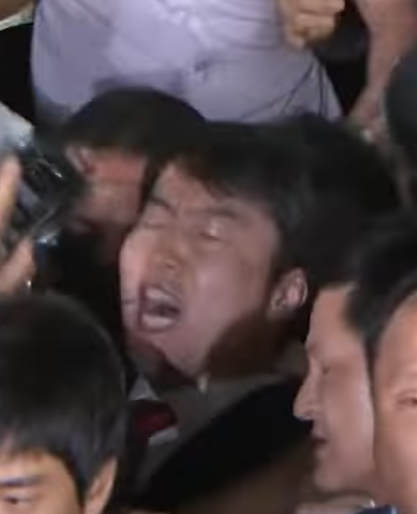
Lee Seok-gi shouting he is innocent while being arrested for organizing the sabotage plot.

On 26 September 2013, South Korean prosecutors indicted Lee Seok-ki, a left-wing lawmaker, on charges that he was plotting a pro-North Korea rebellion to overthrow the government, saying his plan posed a "grave" national security threat. Senior prosecutor Kim Soo-nam told a news conference that Lee and his colleagues specifically brought up possible targets to attack, including a telecommunications facility in Seoul, during the May meeting, which drew 130 people. He said the plotters also discussed using websites to find ways to manufacture firearms and bombs. According to transcripts of conversations at the meeting publicized by South Korean media, some participants talked about ways to make powerful BB guns and searching the internet to find ways to build homemade bombs.

Kim said Lee Seo-ki believed that high tensions between the two Koreas in 2013 spring would lead to war. "It's an incident that an underground revolutionary organization...systemically and collectively plotted to overthrow a free democracy and posed a grave threat to" South Korea's national security, Kim said. He said Lee Seok-ki was indicted on two other charges-inciting a rebellion and praising North Korea in violation of South Korea's anti-Pyongyang security law.

On 25 September 2013, three of Lee Seok-ki's colleagues were also indicted. They are Hong Soon-seok (a Gyeonggi provincial vice chairman of the UPP), Lee Sang-ho (an adviser of Gyeonggi Alliance for Progressive Movement), and Han Dong-geun (a former Suwon chairman of the UPP).

As of 26 September 2013, a total of 4 suspects were indicted after searching and seizing 16 people. The investigation continues into other suspects such as lawmakers Kim Mi-hee and Kim Jae-yeon, both of whom are suspected of participating in the secret meeting of the rebellion group.

The two major criminal charges of Lee Seok-ki presented in the bill of indictment are as follows:

1. "Plotting insurgency" with a resolution of violent revolution In March 2013, Lee issued the three guidelines for war:

a. Build a solidarity organization for emergency as soon as possible. b. Perform a large-scale propaganda using a crowd of people just like the time when "the Mad Cow Disease riot" hit the nation. c. Gather information on military facilities such as U.S. Army camps, U.S. radar bases, and power plants. He made a lecture to 20 people from the CNP Group, which was responsible for the finance and the strategy of the RO, that they should resolve to make ideological and physical preparation; strengthen security against white terror and preventive custody; and wage an unconventional partisan war in the rear.

2. Violation of the National Security Act, by praising and inspiring Lee participated in "the rally for supporting Lee Seok-ki" with Hong Soon-seok (a Gyeonggi provincial vice chairman of the UPP) and other 400 members of the organization and sang "the song for comrades of revolution." He also violated the National Security Act by possessing materials for "benefiting" the enemy: 90 original North Korean contents including a CD of "the works of the great general Kim Jung-il"; 15 North Korean movies; 30 North Korean novels; 27 materials written by pro-North organization and people; and 28 other works.

=== Judgment of first trial ===
On 18 February 2014, Suwon district court adjudicated that Lee serve 12 years in prison, and other prosecuted defendant were adjudicated for 4 to 7 years in prison. And the prosecutions are imminent to prosecute other RO members. Lee's attorney said that they will appeal the adjudication.

== RO (Revolutionary Organization), the insurgent group ==
The RO, organized in August 2003 (the NIS's estimation) after the leader Lee Seok-ki was released from prison, can be described as an updated version of the People's Democratic Revolutionary Party (PDRP), a former underground insurgent organization. The RO, like the PDRP, has a goal of destroying free democratic system of South Korea with more reinforced leadership and security system than its predecessor. The RO has a centralized leadership structure where all the members protect and follow orders from one strong leader, Lee Seok-ki. They observe very strict security rules of their own to hide their existence: They used encrypting software when sending e-mails; Clone Phones of stolen identities are used in communication among members; and especially they used Steganography, a technique of hiding messages in a picture or a text file, typically used by North Korean spies. During 2003–2013 the RO members reportedly infiltrated political parties and NGOs in South Korea and pursued a communist revolution in the country.

=== Three doctrines and five obligations ===
The three doctrines of the RO are as below:

1. Conducting revolution activities for the change of South Korean Societies with "Juche", North Korea's guiding ideology
2. The realization of "independence", "democratization", and "unification" of South Korea
3. The intensified propaganda of Juche. According to the South Korean authorities, the terms "independence", "democratization", and "unification", when used by North Korean regime and its followers, have quite different meanings from the ones in the dictionary. The Workers' Party of Korea, the only party in North Korea, designated those terms as the "three major tasks" for fighting South Korea, in their 5th general assembly in 1970. For North Koreans and the RO members, "Independence" means anti-American movement to expel "the American colonists" from South Korea. "Democratization" is to overthrow the current South Korean government, which they consider to be fascist. For them "Unification" must be realized under the North Korean Juche system.

The RO members' five major obligations are as follows

1. Protection of organization
2. Learning of ideology
3. Share of expenses
4. Division of work
5. Conforming to the organizational culture.

=== Organizational structure ===
The RO was reported to have been organized in 2003 under the guidance of Lee Seok-ki with about 130 persons, most of whom had been the member of the South Kyunggi Committee of the People's Democratic Revolutionary Party (PDRP), the illegal pro-North Korean organization.

The organizational structure of the RO, provided by the National Intelligence Service, is as follows. Under Lee Seok-ki, the person in charge, the RO has "the Central Committee" which consists of four regional and two sectional divisions. The four regional divisions are the East Kyunggi, the South Kyunggi, the Central West Kyunggi, and the North Kyunggi, where "Kyunggi" is the name of a province that forms a big metropolitan area around Seoul. the East Kyunggi is led by Jo Yang-won (the representative of Social Trend Institute) as a senior cell leader, and Kim Keun-rae (a Kyunggi provincial vice chairman of the UPP) as a junior cell leader. Lee Sang-ho (an adviser of Kyunggi Alliance for Progressive Movement), as a senior cell leader, is in charge of the South Kyunggi. The Central West Kyunggi is controlled by Hong Soon-seok (a Kyunggi provincial vice chairman of the UPP) as a senior cell leader, and Han Dong-geun (a former Suwon chairman of the UPP) as a junior cell leader. The North Kyunggi is under the charge of Kim Hong-ryul (the Kyunggi provincial chairman of the UPP) as a senior cell leader, and Lee Young-chun (a Kyunggi-Paju branch manager of Korean Confederation of Trade Union) as a junior cell leader. The two sectional divisions are the Central Team led by Woo Wi-young (an ex-spokesman of the UPP) and the Youth Team managed by Park Min-jung (a former youth chairman of the UPP).

Evidence showed several public servants are included among 130 RO members. Those public servants also participated in the secret meeting of the RO. They were known to work at the community centers or county offices in Kyunggi Province, where most members of the East Kyunggi Coalition of the UPP have residence.

=== Affiliation and conforming process ===
The procedure for affiliation with the RO is made up of three stages, which are "education meeting", "ideology circle", and "acquisition of membership". In the "education meeting" level, the RO candidates learn the basic communist ideology with text books like "the Rewritten Modern History of Korea", in order to become "Juche" (the North Korean philosophy of communism) activists. Those who showed eagerness to learn and finished the first stage move up to the second level of "ideology circle," where they get intensified ideological education with the original North Korean textbooks such as "About Juche ideology," "The Juche revolutionary view on organizations," "Memoirs of Kim Il Sung," and "The collection of Kim Il Sung's writings." At the final stage, candidates formally become members of the RO through the procedures like writing and evaluating resumes, statement of resolution, and recommendation letters. In the initiation ceremony, usually held in an isolated place near seashore or mountain, when the question is asked "Who is our boss?", candidates have to answer "Secretary Kim Jong Il," the former leader of North Korea who died in November 2011.

=== History of RO ===
The origin of the RO is closely related to the People's Democratic Revolutionary Party (PDRP), the underground insurgent organization founded back in the 1990s. In 1998 the National Intelligence Service of South Korea found the connection between North Korean spies and the PDRP through analyses on the evidences like North Korean spies' note books secured from wrecked North Korean semi-submarine boat. The core figure of the PDRP was Kim Young-hwan who wrote the book "Iron Letters" widely known as a textbook of "Juche", the North Korean communist ideology, in the 1980s. In 1989 Kim Young-hwan secretly visited North Korea, joined the communist Workers' Party of Korea, and met Kim Il-song, the leader of North Korea at the time. After that he organized the PDRP with comrades like Ha Young-wook, his alumnus of Seoul University law major. In 1999 Kim Young-hwan was imprisoned for violation of National Security Act, but soon walked out of jail with indictment postponed, after having written a pledge for "ideology change."

Lee Seok-ki also played an important role in the foundation of PDRP as by participating in the inaugural ceremony and actively supporting the party's doctrine "Let's win the people's independence under the ideological guidance of 'Juche', the North Korean communism." In 2002 Lee Seok-ki was involved in the espionage case centered on the PDRP, and in 2003 he was sentenced to 30 months in prison for violating the National Security Act. But on 15 August 2003, he was granted a special pardon for the Independence Day commemoration and released on parole.

The National Intelligence Service believes that the PDRP's doctrines and the goal of communist revolution survived in the RO even though the PDRP itself had been broken up. The ground for the belief is that the RO's four regional divisions of Kyunggi came from "the Committee of South Kyunggi" which was one of the branches of PDRP, and that Lee Seok-ki, the RO's leader, was found to have served as the chief of the committee. The NIS estimates that the RO was organized in late 2003 when Lee Seok-ki was released from prison by the special pardon.

== United Progress Party's resistance ==
=== NIS agents raiding Lee Seok-ki's office ===
On 28 August 2013, the NIS agents raided Lee Seok-ki's office with the warrant at 8:10 am, but faced resistance of Lee's aides and succeeded to enter the office only after 20 minutes of struggle. Inside the office, Lee Seok-ki's fellow lawmakers including Kim Mi-hee blocked the door of another Lee's office room until 3:00 pm.

On 28 August 2013, Lee Seok-ki allegedly took a taxi and ran away in disguise when he found the investigators searching and seizing his place, according to the report of Channel A, a South Korean TV network. On the next day Lee explained he stayed in Seoul. Owing to his running away the execution of the search warrant on his body had to be delayed until the next day.

=== Resisting arrest ===
On 2 September at 10:30 a.m., at one of the National Assembly's meeting rooms, Kim Jae-yeon and Kim Mi-hee, fellow lawmakers of Lee Seok-ki from Unified Progressive Party (UPP), confronted with the passage of the arrest motion for Lee, appealed to lawmakers from the Democratic Party to help Lee. They distributed "the statement of appeal" saying that Lee is innocent of insurgency plot and the NIS investigation is merely McCarthyism and a witch hunt. And about 200 members of the UPP's regional committee crowded in front of the National Assembly's building and collided with security guards there shouting "Stop approving the arrest motion for Lee."

On 4 September 2013, members of the UPP fiercely protested and collided with the NIS investigators executing the arrest warrant for Lee Seok-ki. The NIS, for the execution of the warrant, sent about 60 investigators to Lee's office in the National Assembly's hall, but they were blocked by UPP members. About 30 people from UPP cursed, pushed, and fought against the NIS investigators.

=== Denying of charges ===
On 31 August 2013, the Unified Progressive Party (UPP) held a demonstration in protest of NIS's investigation of Lee Seok-ki and other members of the party on charge of insurgency plot, in front of NIS building in Seocho District, Seoul. In the protest, titled as "a rally against NIS's fabrication of charges and repression", the UPP lawmakers Lee Seok-ki, Lee Jung-hee, and Oh Byung-yoon participated and about 1,500 people (calculation by police) rallied. "This case is a complete set-up. The NIS must stop spreading false information and reveal the video recordings of the meeting, if they have any" the UPP chairwoman Lee Jung-hee said in the rally.

The UPP lawmakers' continuous changing of their previous comments aroused controversies. At first, Lee Seok-ki said "I have never mentioned firearms" denying all the suspicions. But he changed his initial statement and said "It is just a piece of transcript edited with a few keywords," soon after the recording of the meeting was released. He was found to have said "Even a gun can be more valuable than tens of thousands of nuclear weapons," at the meeting. After the detailed transcript of the meeting was open to the public, the UPP spokesman Hong Sung-gyu explained, "The meeting was held by Kyunggi regional branch of the UPP, where Lee Seok-ki was invited to make lectures on current political issues". The UPP lawmaker Kim Jae-yeonn also changed her comments from "There was no such meeting in May" to "I participated in the meeting".

On 4 September 2013, the UPP Chairwoman Lee Jung-hee convened a press conference and told reporters that everything Lee Seok-ki and RO members said at the 12 May meeting was a "joke." "Among the 130 attendees, only one or two of them mentioned weapons or destroying facilities, but it was a kind of a joke, and although some said things like that, the others just laughed," the chairwoman said.

On 4 September 2013, just before the passage of arrest motion for Lee Seok-ki in the National Assembly, Lee claimed: "In a report of the New York Times, they compared the NIS investigation to the past regime's political repression on dissidents in the 1970s, "Yushin" era." However, it was noted that the corresponding report of NYT merely quoted the UPP's comments. The original text of NYT report on 28 August 2013, is as follows; On Wednesday, the Unified Progressive Party said that the raid was reminiscent of the Yushin, or "revitalization," era, when Ms. Park's father, Park Chung Hee ruled the country with an iron fist.
