= Ulsan Metropolitan Council =

Ulsan Metropolitan Council 울산광역시의회
- 8th Ulsan Metropolitan Council

Type
- Type: Unicameral

History
- Founded: 15 July 1997

Leadership
- Chairman: Kim Ki-hwan, People Power
- Vice Chairman: Lee Seong-ryong, People Power
- Vice Chairman: Kang Dae-gil, People Power

Structure
- Seats: 22
- Political groups: People Power (21) Democratic (1)
- Length of term: 4 years

Elections
- Voting system: Parallel voting: First-past-the-post (19 seats); Party-list proportional representation (3 seats)
- Last election: 1 June 2022

Meeting place
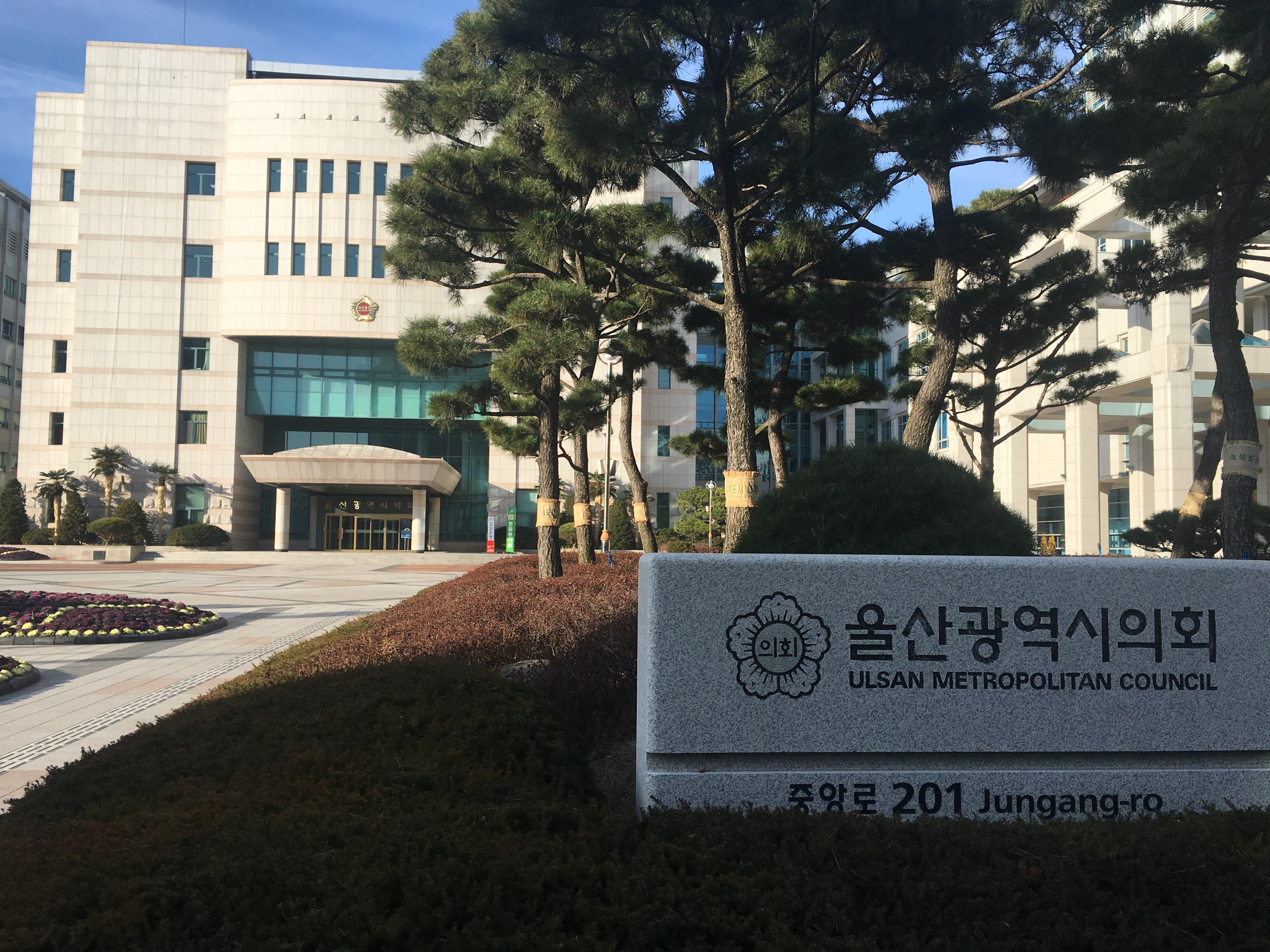

Website
- www.council.ulsan.kr

- Ulsan Metropolitan Council
- Hangul: 울산광역시의회
- Hanja: 蔚山廣域市議會
- RR: Ulsan-gwangyeoksi uihoe
- MR: Ulsan-gwangyŏksi ŭihoe

The Ulsan Metropolitan Council (Korean: 울산광역시의회) is the local council of Ulsan, South Korea.

There are a total of 22 members, with 19 members elected in the First-past-the-post voting system and 3 members elected in Party-list proportional representation.

== Current composition ==
Political party	Seats
People Power	21
Democratic	1
Total	22

The Ulsan Metropolitan Council has no regulations on the negotiation group.

== Organization ==
The structure of Council consists of:

- Chairman
- Two Vice-chairmen
- Standing Committees
  - Steering Committee of Council
  - Administration and Autonomy Committee
  - Environment and Welfare Committee
  - Industry and Construction Committee
  - Education Committee
- Special Committees
  - Special Committees on Budget and Accounts
  - Special Committees on Ethics

== Recent election results ==
=== 2018 ===
Summary of the 13 June 2018 Ulsan Metropolitan Council election results
Party	Constituency				Party list				Total seats	
Party	Votes	%	Seats	±	Votes	%	Seats	±	Seats	±
Democratic Party of Korea	277,409	46.95	15	▲15	281,772	47.00	2	▲1	17	▲16
Liberty Korea Party	231,240	39.14	4	▼15	199,505	33.28	1	▼1	5	▼16
Justice Party	3,366	0.57	0	0	38,680	6.45	0	0	0	0
Minjung Party	52,159	8.83	0	new	31,932	5.32	0	new	0	new
Bareunmirae Party	3,597	0.61	0	new	31,414	5.24	0	new	0	new
Labor Party	6,458	1.09	0	0	10,439	1.74	0	0	0	0
Korean Patriots' Party	—				2,872	0.47	0	new	0	new
Green Party Korea	—				2,824	0.47	0	new	0	new
Other parties	679	0.11	0	0	—				0	0
Independents	15,962	2.70	0	0	—				0	0
Total	590,870	100.00	19	–	599,438	100.00	3	–	22	–
