= Solidarity for New Progressive Integration =

2011 political party in South Korea

- Leader: Cho Seung-su
- Founded: 23 September 2011
- Dissolved: 6 December 2011
- Split from: New Progressive Party
- Merged into: Unified Progressive Party
- Ideology: Progressivism
- Political position: Centre-left
- Colors: Red
- National Assembly: 1 / 299

Korean name
- Hangul: 새진보통합연대
- RR: Sae jinbo tonghap yeondae
- MR: Sae chinbo t'onghap yŏndae

The Solidarity for New Progressive Integration (Korean: 새진보통합연대) was a progressive political party in South Korea founded on 23 September 2011. It was founded by former members of the New Progressive Party, including Sim Sang-jung and Roh Hoe-chan, and merged into the Unified Progressive Party on 5 December 2011.

== History ==
After the New Progressive Party's poor performance in the 2010 local elections, its integration faction, including Sim Sang-jung, Cho Seung-su, and Roh Hoe-chan, advocated for the integration of progressive parties. However, when a proposal to integrate progressive parties was rejected at an internal party meeting, the integration faction left the New Progressive Party and founded the Solidarity for New Progressive Integration on 23 September 2011 to join the Unified Progressive Party.

After its founding, the Solidarity for New Progressive Integration discussed the formation of a unified leadership of progressive parties with the Democratic Labor Party, a progressive party, and the People's Participation Party, a pro-Roh party. The proposal to form the Unified Progressive Party was approved, and the alliance joined the Unified Progressive Party in December 2011.

== See also ==
- Roh Hoe-chan
- Sim Sang-jung
- New Progressive Party
- Unified Progressive Party
