= Bumingwan =

Historic building in Seoul, South Korea

- 부민관
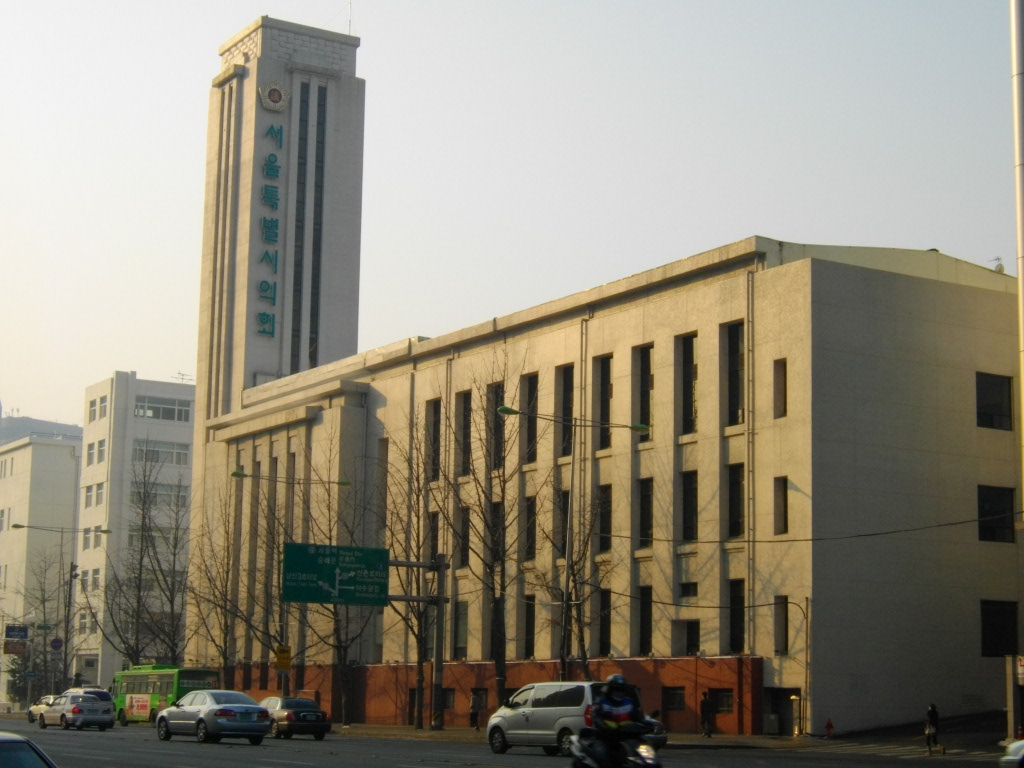
- The building (2009)
- Interactive map of the Bumingwan area

General information
- Type: Multi-purpose
- Location: 125 Sejong-daero, Jung District, Seoul, South Korea
- Coordinates: 37.5676°N 126.9767°E
- Construction started: July 30, 1934
- Completed: December 10, 1935
- Owner: Seoul Metropolitan Government

Bumingwan (Korean: 부민관; Hanja: 府民館; MR: Pumin'gwan; Modified Hepburn: Fuminkan) is a historic building in Seoul, South Korea. It previously served as the building for Korea's National Assembly. It now currently serves as a building for the Seoul Metropolitan Council. It was designated a Registered Cultural Heritage in 2002.

== History ==
The building was originally designed to be a multi-purpose entertainment building, with spaces for plays, movies, lectures, and meetings. Construction began on July 30, 1934, and ended on December 10, 1935. It had three floors above ground, and one underground. It had a large auditorium that could seat 1,800, a medium auditorium with capacity for 400, and a small one for 160. It had a large variety of rooms beyond that, including space for a restaurant, a barbershop, and for hosting guests. It was rare for the time for its modern amenities, which included air conditioning and heating.

The facilities in the building were available to rent for various purposes. Accordingly, events like weddings, memorial ceremonies, and celebrations were held at the building. It was used as a theater by many significant Korean theater companies during the colonial period. Some historic Korean plays were written with the stage of Bumingwan in mind.

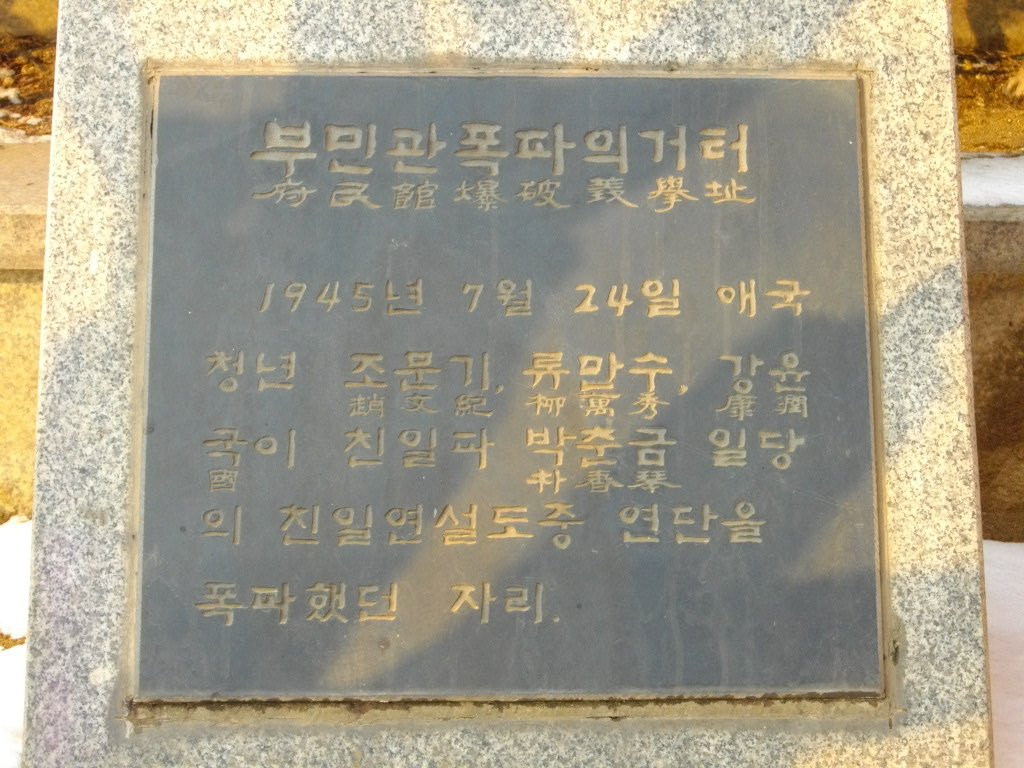
Monument to the bombing incident at the building (2009)

In 1937, after the beginning of the Second Sino-Japanese War, the building became a center for coordinating propaganda and the forced mobilization of Koreans. Eventually, it was targeted by the Korean independence movement because of this. On July 24, 1945, the building was the site of the Bumingwan bombing incident. A conference for pro-Japanese Korean collaborators was being held at the building at the time. The attack occurred just weeks before the surrender of Japan, the liberation of Korea, and the end of the Korean independence movement.

After liberation, the building was used by the United States Army Military Government in Korea. General John R. Hodge, head of the military government, hosted a series of meetings in the building in September 1945.

In 1949, it became owned by the Seoul Metropolitan Government. On April 29, 1950, the National Theater Company of Korea was founded, and it used the building as its headquarters. Shortly afterwards, the Korean War began, and the theater company fled to Daegu for safety. The building was then used as the meeting hall for the National Assembly beginning in June 1954 until the National Assembly Proceeding Hall was completed in 1975. It was then used as a civic center, then annex for the Sejong Center. Since 1991, it has been a building for the Seoul Metropolitan Council.
