= National Assembly Building (South Korea) =

South Korean capitol building

Coordinates: 37°31′55.21″N 126°54′50.66″E

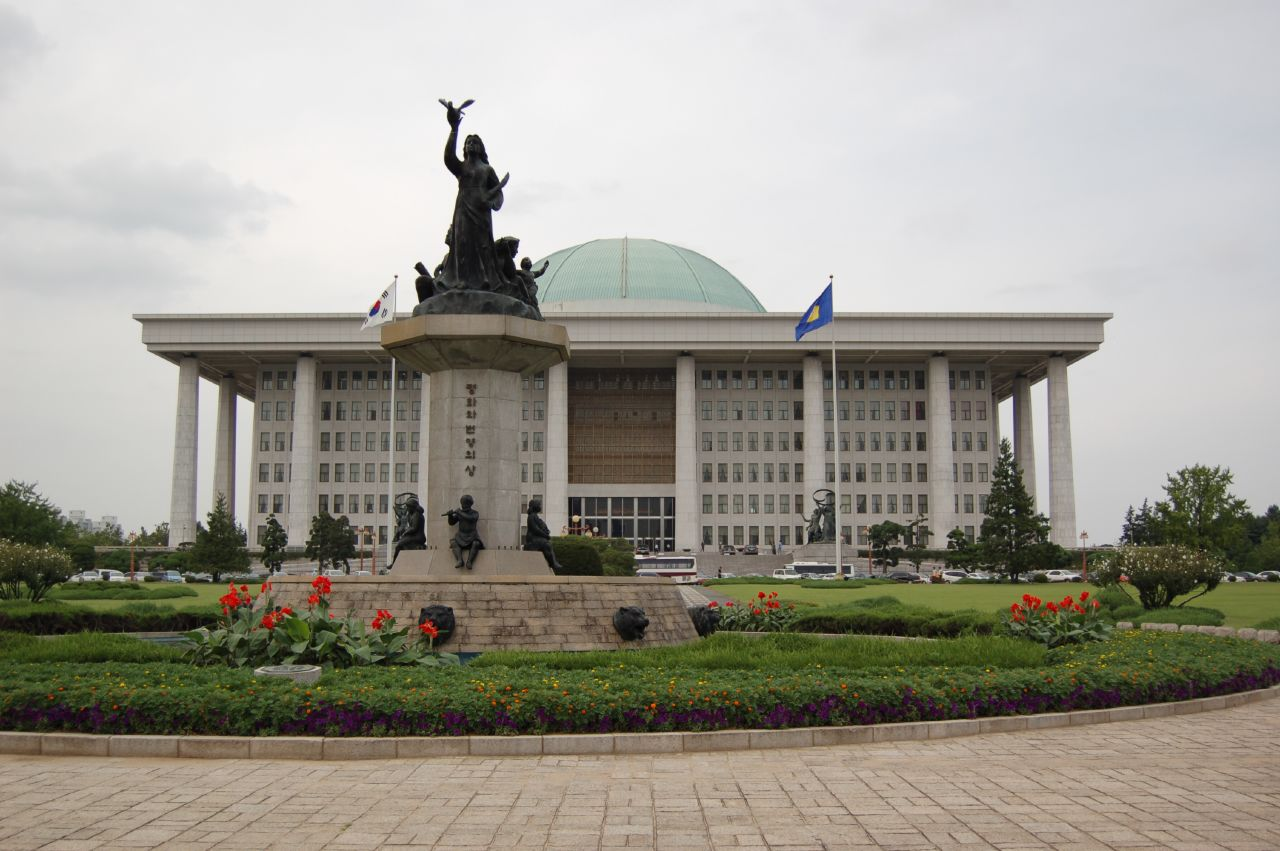
- The Korean National Assembly Building in Yeouido, Seoul

Korean name
- Hangul: 국회의사당
- Hanja: 國會議事堂
- RR: Gukhoe uisadang
- MR: Kukhoe ŭisadang

Korea National Assembly Proceeding Hall in 2019

The National Assembly Building (Korean: 국회의사당) is a building in Yeouido-dong, Yeongdeungpo District, Seoul which serves as the location of the National Assembly of the Republic of Korea, the legislature of South Korea.

== History ==
The current building was completed in 1975. Before 1975 the South Korean government used the colonial-era Bumingwan, which is now used by the Seoul Metropolitan Council. The plenary chamber has seating for 400 people, ostensibly in preparation for new lawmakers in case Korean reunification occurs. The National Assembly Proceeding Hall has been used for the inaugurations for several presidents Roh Tae-woo in 1988, Kim Young-sam in 1993, Kim Dae-jung in 1998, Roh Moo-hyun in 2003, Lee Myung-bak in 2008, Park Geun-hye in 2013, Moon Jae-in in 2017, Yoon Suk-yeol in 2022 and Lee Jae-Myung in 2025.

During the period of the 2024 South Korean martial law, South Korean President Yoon Suk-yeol sent troops to storm the building where clashes occurred between the soldiers and civilians including parliamentary staff. The soldiers were prevented from reaching the session hall, enabling lawmakers to vote down the declaration of martial law and forcing the military to withdraw.

== See also ==
- National Assembly of South Korea
- Blue House, the South Korean president's official residence
