= Seoul Metropolitan Council =

Local council of Seoul, South Korea

Seoul Metropolitan Council 서울특별시의회
- 12nd Seoul Metropolitan Council

Type
- Type: Unicameral

History
- Founded: 5 September 1956

Leadership
- Chairman: Kim Hyeon-gi, People Power
- Vice Chairman: Nam Chang-jin, People Power
- Vice Chairman: Woo Hyeong-chan, Democratic

Structure
- Seats: 118
- Political groups: Democratic (80) People Power (38)
- Length of term: 4 years

Elections
- Voting system: Parallel voting: First-past-the-post (103 seats); Party-list proportional representation (15 seats)
- Last election: 3 June 2026

Meeting place
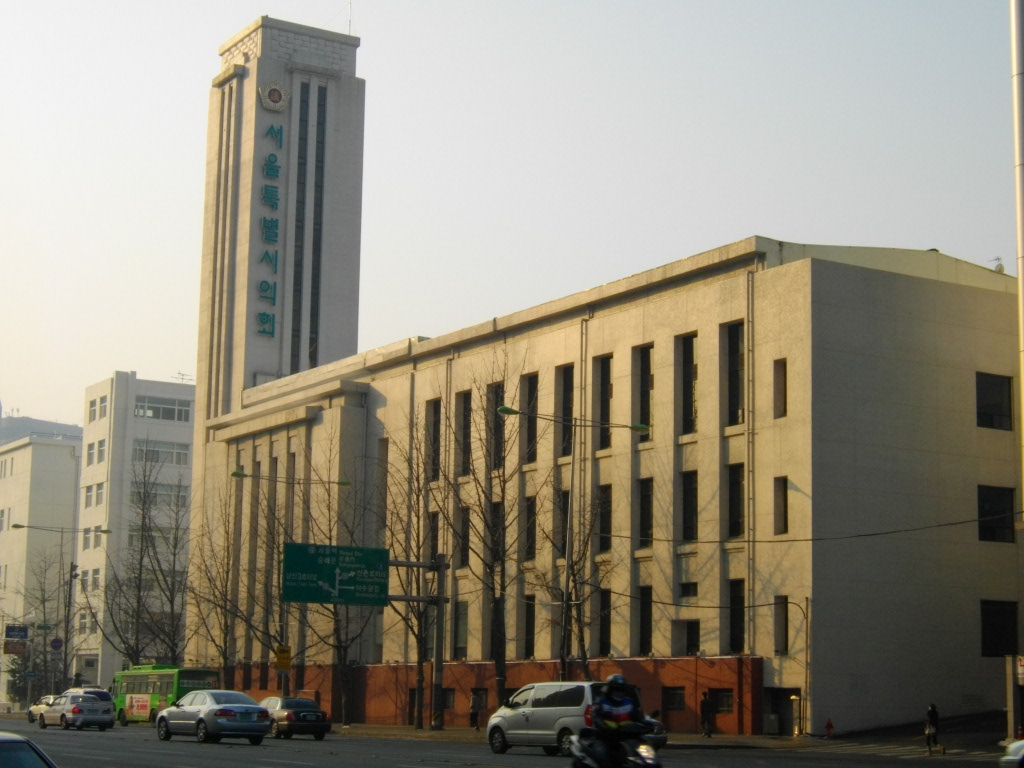
- Bumingwan

Website
- Seoul Metropolitan Council (Korean); Seoul Metropolitan Council (English)

- Seoul Metropolitan Council
- Hangul: 서울특별시의회
- Hanja: 서울特別市議會
- RR: Seoul-teukbyeolsi uihoe
- MR: Sŏul-t'ŭkpyŏlsi ŭihoe

The Seoul Metropolitan Council (Korean: 서울특별시의회) is the local council of Seoul.

There are a total of 118 members, with 103 members elected in the First-past-the-post voting system and 15 members elected in Party-list proportional representation.

The council uses the historic building Bumingwan in Jung District.

== Current composition ==
| Political party | Seats |
|---|---|
| People Power | 76 |
| Democratic | 36 |
| Total | 112 |

Negotiation groups can be formed by 10 or more members.

=== List of council members ===
| Constituency | Member | Political party |
|---|---|---|
| Gangnam 1st | Lee Sae-nal | People Power |
| Gangnam 2nd | Kim Hyeong-jae | People Power |
| Gangnam 3rd | Kim Hyeong-gi | People Power |
| Gangnam 4th | Yoo Man-hee | People Power |
| Gangnam 5th | Kim Dong-uk | People Power |
| Gangnam 6th | Kim Gil-yeong | People Power |
| Gangdong 1st | Kim Hye-ji | People Power |
| Gangdong 2nd | Lee Jong-tae | People Power |
| Gangdong 3rd | Park Chun-seon | People Power |
| Gangdong 4th | Chang Tae-yong | People Power |
| Gangdong 5th | Kim Yeong-cheol | People Power |
| Gangbuk 1st | Lee Jong-hwan | People Power |
| Gangbuk 2nd | Lee Sang-hoon | Democratic |
| Gangbuk 3rd | Lee Yong-gyun | Democratic |
| Gangbuk 4th | Park Su-bin | Democratic |
| Gangseo 1st | Kim Kyeong | Democratic |
| Gangseo 2nd | Kang Seok-joo | People Power |
| Gangseo 3rd | Choi Jin-kyeok | People Power |
| Gangseo 4th | Kim Chun-gon | People Power |
| Gangseo 5th | Kim Kyeong-hoon | People Power |
| Gangseo 6th | Kyeong Ki-moon | People Power |
| Gwanak 1st | Song Do-ho | Democratic |
| Gwanak 2nd | Wang Jeong-soon | Democratic |
| Gwanak 3rd | Lim Man-kyun | Democratic |
| Gwanak 4th | Yoo Jeong-hee | Democratic |
| Gwangjin 1st | Jeon Byeong-ju | Democratic |
| Gwangjin 2nd | Park Seong-yeon | People Power |
| Gwangjin 3rd | Kim Yeong-ok | People Power |
| Gwangjin 4th | Kim Hye-yeong | People Power |
| Guro 1st | Seo Sang-yeol | People Power |
| Guro 2nd | Kim In-je | Democratic |
| Guro 3rd | Seo Ho-yeon | People Power |
| Guro 4th | Park Chil-seong | People Power |
| Geumcheon 1st | Kim Seong-jun | People Power |
| Geumcheon 2nd | Choi Gi-chan | Democratic |
| Nowon 1st | Shin Dong-won | People Power |
| Nowon 2nd | Park Hwan-hee | People Power |
| Nowon 3rd | Bong Yang-soon | Democratic |
| Nowon 4th | Seo Jun-oh | Democratic |
| Nowon 5th | Yoon Ki-seop | People Power |
| Nowon 6th | Song Jae-hyuk | Democratic |
| Dobong 1st | Lee Kyeong-suk | People Power |
| Dobong 2nd | Hong Kuk-pyo | People Power |
| Dobong 3rd | Park Seok | People Power |
| Dobong 4th | Lee Eun-rim | People Power |
| Dongdaemun 1st | Lee Byeong-Yoon | People Power |
| Dongdaemun 2nd | Shim Mi-gyeong | People Power |
| Dongdaemun 3rd | Nam Kung-yeok | People Power |
| Dongdaemun 4th | Shin Bok-ja | People Power |
| Dongjak 1st | Lee Bong-jun | People Power |
| Dongjak 2nd | Choi Min-kyu | People Power |
| Dongjak 3rd | Kwak Hyang-gi | People Power |
| Dongjak 4th | Lee Hee-won | People Power |
| Mapo 1st | Lee Min-seok | People Power |
| Mapo 2nd | Soh Yeong-cheol | People Power |
| Mapo 3rd | Jeong Jin-sul | Democratic |
| Mapo 4th | Kim Ki-deok | Democratic |
| Seodaemun 1st | Cheong Ji-ung | People Power |
| Seodaemun 2nd | Moon Seong-ho | People Power |
| Seodaemun 3rd | Lee Seung-mi | Democratic |
| Seodaemun 4th | Kim Yong-il | People Power |
| Seocho 1st | Park Sang-hyeok | People Power |
| Seocho 2nd | Lee Suk-ja | People Power |
| Seocho 3rd | Ko Kwang-min | People Power |
| Seocho 4th | Choi Ho-jeong | People Power |
| Seongdong 1st | Park Chung-hwa | People Power |
| Seongdong 2nd | Ku Mi-gyeong | People Power |
| Seongdong 3rd | Lee Min-ok | Democratic |
| Seongdong 4th | Hwang Cheol-gyu | People Power |
| Seongbuk 1st | Han Shin | Democratic |
| Seongbuk 2nd | Kim Won-jung | People Power |
| Seongbuk 3rd | Kang Dong-gil | Democratic |
| Seongbuk 4th | Kim Tae-su | People Power |
| Songpa 1st | Kim Kyu-nam | People Power |
| Songpa 2nd | Nam Chang-jin | People Power |
| Songpa 3rd | Lim Chun-dae | People Power |
| Songpa 4th | Lee Seong-bae | People Power |
| Songpa 5th | Yoo Jeong-in | People Power |
| Songpa 6th | Kim Won-tae | People Power |
| Yangcheon 1st | Chae Su-ji | People Power |
| Yangcheon 2nd | Heo Hun | People Power |
| Yangcheon 3rd | Woo Hyoung-chan | Democratic |
| Yangcheon 4th | Lee Seung-bok | People Power |
| Yeongdeungpo 1st | Choi Woong-shik | Democratic |
| Yeongdeungpo 2nd | Kim Jae-jin | People Power |
| Yeongdeungpo 3rd | Doe Mun-yeol | People Power |
| Yeongdeungpo 4th | Kim Ji-hyang | People Power |
| Yongsan 1st | KIm Yong-ho | People Power |
| Yongsan 2nd | Choi Yoo-hee | People Power |
| Eunpyeong 1st | Seong Heum-je | Democratic |
| Eunpyeong 2nd | Lee Byung-do | Democratic |
| Eunpyeong 3rd | Park Yoo-jin | Democratic |
| Eunpyeong 4th | Jeong Jun-ho | Democratic |
| Jongno 1st | Yoon Jong-bok | People Power |
| Jongno 2nd | Lim Jong-guk | Democratic |
| Jung 1st | Park Yeong-han | People Power |
| Jung 2nd | Ok Jae-eun | People Power |
| Jungnang 1st | Lee Young-sil | Democratic |
| Jungnang 2nd | Lim Kyu-ho | Democratic |
| Jungnang 3rd | Park Seung-jin | Democratic |
| Jungnang 4th | Min Byeong-ju | People Power |
| Proportional representation | Hwang Yoo-jeong | People Power |
| Proportional representation | Lee Sang-uk | People Power |
| Proportional representation | Yoon Yeong-hee | People Power |
| Proportional representation | Lee Jong-bae | People Power |
| Proportional representation | Lee Hyo-won | People Power |
| Proportional representation | Song Kyeong-taek | People Power |
| Proportional representation | Lee So-ra | Democratic |
| Proportional representation | Park Kang-san | Democratic |
| Proportional representation | Ai Su Luu | Democratic |
| Proportional representation | Lee Won-hyeong | Democratic |
| Proportional representation | Choi Jae-ran | Democratic |

== Organization ==
The structure of Council consists of:

- Chairman
- Two Vice Chairmen
- Standing Committees
  - Council Steering Committee
  - Administration & Autonomy Committee
  - Planning & Economy Committee
  - Environment & Water Resources Committee
  - Culture, Sports & Tourism Committee
  - Health & Social Affairs Committee
  - Public Safety & Construction Committee
  - City Planning & Management Committee
  - Transportation Committee
  - Education Committee
- Special Committees
  - Special Committees on Budget & Accounts
  - Special Committees on Ethics

== Recent election results ==
=== 2018 ===
Summary of the 13 June 2018 Seoul Metropolitan Council election results
| Party | Constituency | | | | Party list | | | | Total seats | |
| Party | Votes | % | Seats | ± | Votes | % | Seats | ± | Seats | ± |
|---|---|---|---|---|---|---|---|---|---|---|
| Democratic Party of Korea | 3,022,905 | 61.89 | 97 | ▲25 | 2,523,110 | 50.92 | 5 | 0 | 102 | ▲25 |
| Liberty Korea Party | 1,400,927 | 28.68 | 3 | ▼21 | 1,250,856 | 25.24 | 3 | ▼2 | 6 | ▼23 |
| Bareunmirae Party | 419,635 | 8.59 | 0 | new | 569,224 | 11.48 | 1 | new | 1 | new |
| Justice Party | —N/a | | | | 480,371 | 9.69 | 1 | ▲1 | 1 | ▲1 |
| Party for Democracy and Peace | 10,668 | 0.22 | 0 | new | 43,839 | 0.88 | 0 | new | 0 | new |
| Green Party Korea | —N/a | | | | 37,974 | 0.76 | 0 | 0 | 0 | 0 |
| Minjung Party | 12,989 | 0.27 | 0 | new | 17,249 | 0.34 | 0 | new | 0 | new |
| Korean Patriots' Party | 789 | 0.02 | 0 | new | 15,726 | 0.31 | 0 | new | 0 | new |
| Other parties | 1,537 | 0.03 | 0 | 0 | —N/a | | | | 0 | 0 |
| Independents | 14,560 | 0.30 | 0 | 0 | —N/a | | | | 0 | 0 |
| Total | 4,884,010 | 100.00 | 100 | – | 4,954,933 | 100.00 | 10 | – | 110 | – |

== See also ==
- Seoul Metropolitan Government
- Seoul City Hall
