= Daeil Foreign Language High School =

Coordinates: 37°36′48″N 127°00′48″E

- 대일외국어고등학교; Hanja: 大一外國語高等學校
- Seongbuk-Gu, Seoul; Korea, Republic of

Information
- Type: Private
- Established: 1983
- Principal: 이도훈
- Faculty: approx. 90
- Enrollment: approx. 1,200
- Slogan: (너가 해석해봐)
- Tree: Zelkova
- Flower: Rose

Daeil Foreign Language High School (Korean: 대일외국어고등학교; Hanja: 大一外國語高等學校), located in Seoul, is one of the most prestigious high schools in South Korea. The private, coeducational, college preparatory school was founded in 1983 as the first foreign language high school to be established in South Korea aiming the goal of nurturing future global Leaders. Daeil offers the largest variety of curricula among all foreign language high schools in the nation. The school's primary language of instruction is Korean, regardless of which focus subject students choose when entering the school.

While the school was founded to focus on the education of the rich, it has over time come to serve more as a preparatory school for selective Korean universities and prestigious foreign universities in the United States, the United Kingdom, Japan, etc. According to 2008 university entrance statistics, Daeil achieved the highest number of students (248 in total) entering the three top national universities (Seoul National University, Yonsei University, and Korea University) among all kinds of 2200 high schools in Korea. Recently in 2023, Daeil achieved 113 students entering the above three universities.

Like most schools in Korea, Daeil starts its school year in March, starts its second semester in September, and ends the school year in February.

== School facilities ==
Daeil consists of four main buildings (Main Building, Central Building, Language Lab, and Yul-gok Building), a garden, a dormitory, and a cafeteria.

10th grade and 11th grade students study in the Central Building, while 12th grade seniors study in the Main Building.

The school library is located within the Language Lab.

In addition to the library, foreign language conversation classrooms are located in the Lab.

This particular area is designated as the 'FOZ'; Foreign Language Only Zone, where students must speak in a foreign language to earn 'language points' and to avoid penalty - both of which are tallied in the official school records.

== Extracurricular activities ==
Unlike most Korean high schools, Daeil has no varsity sports teams, but there are more than 30 extracurricular activities clubs available to students.

== Admissions ==
The school receives applications from junior-high school students from Seoul only (starting 2009). An official admissions exam takes place annually, usually around late autumn. For the most part, students must achieve exceptional scores on this exam, as well as having a prominent middle school record, and various accolades. In its promotional material, Daeil claims to draw students from the top 1% of Korean junior-high school students. Also, the admission exam includes a formal interview, which is overall considered challenging. As such, students who wish to be admitted undertake rigorous test preparation regimes.

== Faculty ==
The Daeil faculty includes graduates of top ranking Korean universities such as Seoul National University, Yonsei University, and Korea University, as well as native foreign language instructors who teach Chinese, Japanese, French, Spanish, German, Russian, and English conversation and comprehension classes.

== DOSP ==
DOSP (Daeil Overseas Study Program) is a sectioned, optional studies track for students wishing to study abroad, i.e. to apply to foreign universities.

Students wishing to join the DOSP must sign up at the beginning of each year, and a nonformal interview type acceptance is required.

DOSP classes are scheduled after regular school hours, and students mainly take subjects to earn credits for Advanced Placement exams, the SAT I, SAT Subject tests, and other preparation classes to studying abroad. However, teachers and counselors for the DOSP are not provided by the school, which leaves the burden of payment and scouting to the hands of the students and their parents.

Daeil DOSP program has been discontinued indefinitely since August 2010 due to the lack of support and subsidies from the school and declined popularity.

== Admittance to universities ==
According to 2008 university entrance statistics, Daeil achieved the highest number of students (248 in total) entering the three top national universities (Seoul National University, Yonsei University, and Korea University).

== Incumbent principal ==
Lee Yong Jae 이용재

Mr. Lee was the vice-principal of the school under Mr. Kong until February 2013.

== Contact information ==
- Address: (Zipcode: 136-100) 17-180 Jeongneung-dong Sungbuk-gu Seoul, ROK
