= Progressive Party (South Korea, 2017) =

Political party in South Korea

Progressive Party 진보당
- Leader: Kim Jong-hoon
- Secretary-General: Shin Chang-hyun
- Floor Leader: Yoon Jong-oh
- Co-leaders: See list: Jang Jin-suk; Jung Tae-heung; Jung Hee-sung; Kim Bong-yong; Lee Kyung-min; Jang Ji-hwa; Hong Hee-jin
- Chair of the Policy Planning Committee: Jang Jin-sook
- Founded: 15 October 2017
- Merger of: New People's Party; People's United Party
- Headquarters: 130 Sajik-ro, Jongno District, Seoul
- Youth wing: 청년진보당 (Youth Progressive Party)
- Membership (2023): 98,074
- Ideology: Progressivism (South Korean); Anti-imperialism; Left-wing nationalism; Left-wing populism
- Political position: Left-wing to far-left
- National affiliation: Democratic Alliance of Korea (2024)
- Colors: Red (Note: as Progressive Party); Historical; Orange (Note: as Minjung Party)
- Slogan: 든든한 우리편 ('Always reliable and at our side')
- National Assembly: 4 / 300
- Metropolitan Mayors and Governors: 0 / 16
- Municipal Mayors: 0 / 227
- Provincial and Metropolitan Councillors: 7 / 933
- Municipal Councillors: 34 / 3,034

Website
- jinboparty.com

Korean name
- Hangul: 진보당
- Hanja: 進步黨
- RR: Jinbodang
- MR: Chinbodang

Minjung Party
- Hangul: 민중당
- Hanja: 民衆黨
- RR: Minjungdang
- MR: Minjungdang

The Progressive Party (Korean: 진보당) is a left-wing to far-left progressive and left-wing nationalist political party in South Korea.

The Progressive Party was founded in October 2017 as a merger of the New People's Party and People's United Party, both of which were de facto continuations of the banned Unified Progressive Party. Initially holding three seats in the National Assembly, the party lost its remaining seat in the 2020 legislative election. In June 2020, the party changed its name to the Progressive Party. In 2023, the party came under investigation by President Yoon Suk-yeol's administration for its alleged links to North Korea. In an April 2023 by-election, it gained one seat in the National Assembly. In the 2024 legislative election, they joined the Democratic Party-led Democratic Alliance of Korea and gained three seats.

The Progressive Party is generally considered to be left-wing and progressive, and is sometimes labeled as far-left, mostly due to its sympathies toward North Korea, opposition to the U.S. military presence in South Korea, and political similarities to the defunct Unified Progressive Party (UPP; 통합진보당). The party is economically progressive, and favors policies to redistribute wealth and regulate chaebol companies. It holds socially progressive views, favoring ending conscription and expanding women's rights and LGBT rights. It advocates dissolving the alliance between the United States and South Korea and reconciling and lifting sanctions on North Korea.

== History ==
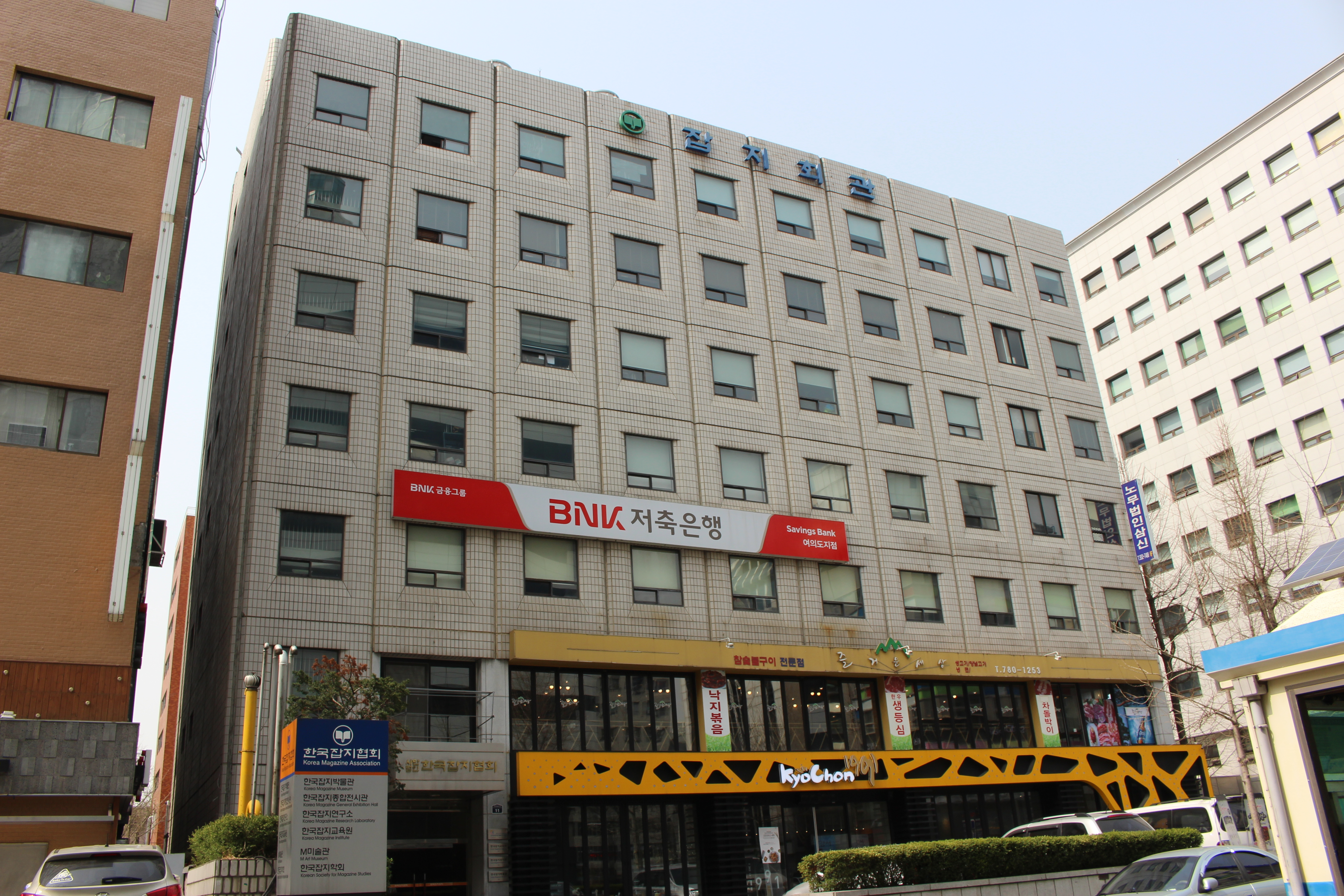
Party headquarters

The Minjung Party (민중당; lit. 'People's Party') was formed on 15 October 2017 as a merger of the New People's Party and People's United Party. Both parties were continuations of the Unified Progressive Party, a party that was dissolved and banned by a Constitutional Court ruling in 2014 for its allegedly pro-North Korean and "anti-constitutional" activity. When it formed, the party had two members in the National Assembly, both from Ulsan. On 22 December 2017, the supreme court convicted representative Yoon Jong-oe of breaking campaign laws and he was removed from office.

In July 2018, members of the Minjung Party met with members of the North Korean Social Democratic Party in China. The meeting was not authorized by the Ministry of Unification which could have punished the party for violations of South Korea's National Security Act. Jung Tae-heung, the co-chair of the Minjung Party, stated that he was warned the party may be fined for the meeting. In August 2019, the party supported the nationwide protests against Japanese prime minister Shinzo Abe and the boycott against Japanese products.

The party lost its remaining seat in the 2020 legislative election. The Minjung Party tried to join the Platform Party, a proportional party created by the Democratic Party of Korea (DPK). However, the DPK refused to let them do so. On 6 June 2020, the party changed its name from the Minjung Party to the Progressive Party.

In March 2022, suspicions arose that some party officials were operating in South Korea while receiving orders from North Korea. The Progressive Party denied that they had ever received orders. In January 2023, President Yoon Suk-yeol's administration launched investigations into Progressive Party members for allegedly planning anti-American and anti-government activities by receiving orders from North Korea spies. The Progressive Party protested that this was simply a crackdown on progressive political groups. Editorials in the Kyunghyang Shinmun expressed concerns that the Yoon Suk-yeol administration was pressuring labor unions and civic groups and creating a police state through counterintelligence investigations.

In a by-election held on 5 April 2023, the Progressive Party once again became a parliamentary party after securing one seat. Kang Sung-hee was elected in Jeonju B district, which was a stronghold of the DPK. The DPK does not run candidates in by-elections if the Democratic politician was removed from office due to breaking the law, and their former representative had been arrested and removed from office for bribing voters with cash handouts. The election was held as a six-way contest between a Progressive Party candidate, the conservative People Power Party and four independents, including two Democrats who ran as independents. The Progressive Party's re-entry into Parliament drew intense criticism from right-wing conservative media. In particular, right-wing newspaper The Chosun Ilbo criticized in articles and editorials that some of the members of the Progressive Party were suspected of pro-North Korea espionage and that the party was the successor of the Unified Progressive Party. Meanwhile, media outlets with a liberal/progressive stance, such as Hankyoreh, gave a positive assessment. They suggested that the party's candidate would secure a seat, largely due to the Democratic Party of Korea employing 'color theory' tactics.

In the 2024 legislative election, the joined the Democratic Party-led Democratic Alliance of Korea and gained three seats.

== Political positions ==
The Progressive Party is left-wing. It is usually classified by Korean media outlets as "far-left" (Korean: 극좌; Hanja: 極左) or "radical left". The Progressive Party supports the restoration of South Korea's sovereignty and full "independence" in the international community. The term "independence" here means opposition to Japanese imperialism, support for reunification with North Korea, a protectionist trade policy, and establishment of equitable diplomatic relations with world powers such as the United States. The party's official ideology is "progressivism", not "socialism". The Progressive Party is in favour of direct democracy, to be used as a mean for the minjung to actively participate in politics.

The most important reason for the Progressive Party's classification as far-left in South Korean politics is opposition to American imperialism. The Progressive Party believes that South Korea's socioeconomic contradictions are primarily due to the United States, rather than China or Japan, and hence opposes American domination of the Korean economy. Liberal parties such as the DPK and JP contrast sharply, being hostile to China and Japan but somewhat favourable to the United States as a counterweight to their hegemony. The Progressive Party, in particular, advocates dissolving the alliance between the United States and South Korea.

=== Economic policy ===
The party supports the redistribution of wealth and economically progressive positions such as imposing a 90% tax rate on inheritances of more than 3 billion won (roughly US$2,500,000). The Progressive Party opposes restricting the labour of senior citizens over the age of 60. Their justification is that, because South Korea is not a European welfare state, there is a livelihood problem for the elderly. Some socialists in South Korea consider it a liberal party, instead of a left-wing party.

The party has a negative view of multinational corporations and the chaebols (industrial conglomerates). Their official party platform proposes to "dismantle the monopoly economy of transnational capital and chaebol". The party also maintains an active cooperative relationship with the Korean Confederation of Trade Unions.

=== Foreign policy ===
The Progressive Party is an anti-imperialist party. Following a policy of left-wing nationalism, the party seeks to liquidate the remnants of colonialism from the Japanese imperialist era and end the inequality in South Korea–United States relations. They advocate dissolving the alliance between the United States and South Korea. In 2019, The Progressive Party issued a joint statement opposing Japanese imperialism with the Korean Social Democratic Party (a North Korean party).

The Progressive Party opposes supplying lethal aid to Ukraine in the Russian invasion of Ukraine. The Progressive Party accused the Yoon Suk-yeol government of engaging in diplomacy to antagonize Russia.

==== North Korea ====
The Progressive Party takes a minjokjuui (Korean: 민족주의; Hanja: 民族主義; lit. '[Korean ethnic] nationalism') view on the topic of North Korea, rather than the kukkajuui (Korean: 국가주의; Hanja: 國家主義; lit. 'Statism' or 'State-aligned nationalism') they allege is advocated by conservatives in South Korea. The Progressive Party argues that kukkajuui accepts American imperialism and the division of Korea into north and south, whereas minjokjuui embraces all Koreans and is opposed to foreign imperialism. They support reunification with North Korea and an official end to the (technically still ongoing) Korean War. Therefore, they oppose sanctions on North Korea and argue that only removing sanctions will bring peace to the Korean peninsula. They support the Sunshine Policy, a policy of reconciliation towards North Korea.

The Progressive Party has been criticized for taking what others have characterized as a friendly stance toward North Korea. The centrist daily newspaper Hankook Ilbo has called the Progressive Party 'pro-North Korea'.

==== International exchange ====
The Progressive Party has frequently engaged in dialogue with the American left. When the party was founded, American left-wing intellectuals such as Ramsey Clark and Noam Chomsky expressed their sympathy for the cause, especially with respect to attitudes regarding Korean reunification, and policy towards North Korea. The Progressive Party also contacted certain American politicians such as Jesse Jackson and Bernie Sanders in 2018 to draw support for the declaration of the end of the Korean War.

The Progressive Party has liaison support with the Green Party of the United States in policies concerning inter-Korean relations, for example the symbolic goal of a formal end to the Korean War.

=== Social policy ===
The party also supports women's rights, LGBT rights, youth politics and labor-oriented politics. The Progressive Party maintains active cooperative relationships with various organizations associated with the feminist movement in Korea, and adopted feminism as one of its major agendas in the 2022 presidential election.

==== Multiculturalism ====
The Progressive Party is a Korean nationalist party, but they believe that Korean ethnic nationalism is not racism, and they support multiculturalism and the rights of immigrants to South Korea. In addition, the Progressive Party opposes neoliberalism, believing it promotes discrimination against immigrants. The Progressive Party, along with human rights groups, accused the Moon Jae-in government's COVID-19 quarantine policy in March 2021 of being discriminatory against foreign workers.

== Criticism ==
Political conservatives accused the Progressive Party of being merely an attempt to re-establish the Unified Progressive Party (UPP). The Korea Herald in April 2023 also matched the party with the previously dissolved UPP. Some politicians affiliated with the liberal Democratic Party of Korea also have criticized the Progressive Party for its anti-American activities.

In South Korea, critics including the Labor Party allege the Justice Party and Progressive Party are liberal rather than progressive; differing diplomatic views, however, make the Labor Party more moderate than the Progressive Party. Some equate the Progressive Party's line with the Justice Party and the Labor Party's centre-left social democracy.

== Leadership ==
=== Leaders ===
1. Kim Jong-hoon, Kim Chang-han (co-serving; 15 October 2017 – 25 August 2018)
2. Lee Sang-kyu (26 August 2018 – 20 June 2020)
3. Kim Jae-yeon (20 June 2020 – 31 July 2022)
4. Yoon Hee-suk (1 August 2022 – 14 June 2024)
5. Kim Jae-yeon (15 June 2024 – 24 July 2026)
6. Kim Jong-hoon (24 July 2026 - present)

=== Floor leaders ===
1. Yoon Jong-o (15 October 2017 – 22 December 2017)
2. Kim Jong-hoon (22 December 2017 – 29 May 2020)
3. Kang Sung-hee (6 April 2023 – 29 May 2024)
4. Yoon Jong-o (30 May 2024 – present)

== Election results ==
=== Presidential ===
Election	Candidate	Votes	%	Result
2022	Kim Jae-yeon	37,366	0.11	Lost

=== Local ===
Election	Leader	Metropolitan mayor/Governor	Provincial legislature	Municipal mayor	Municipal legislature
2018	Kim Jong-hoon; Kim Chang-han	0 / 17	0 / 824	0 / 226	11 / 2,927
2022	Kim Jae-yeon	0 / 17	3 / 872	1 / 226	17 / 2,987
2026	Kim Jae-yeon	0 / 16	7 / 933	0 / 227	34 / 3,034

=== By-elections ===
Election	Leader	National Assembly	Metropolitan mayor/governors	Municipal mayor	Provincial/metropolitan councillors	Municipal councillors
April 2023	Yoon Hee-suk	1 / 1	—N/a	0 / 1	0 / 2	0 / 4
October 2023	Yoon Hee-suk	—N/a	—N/a	0 / 1	—N/a	—N/a
April 2024	Yoon Hee-suk	—N/a	—N/a	0 / 2	1 / 17	1 / 26

== Logos ==
First logo of the Jinbo (formerly known as Minjung) Party

Second logo of the Jinbo (formerly known as Minjung) Party

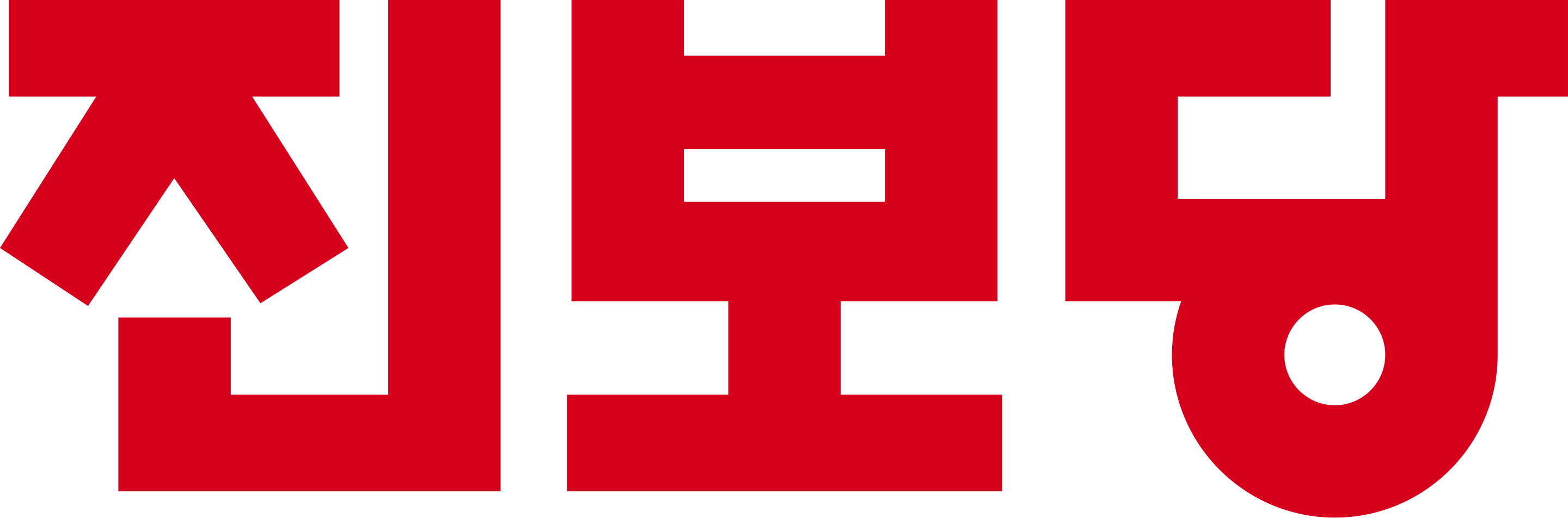
Third logo of the Jinbo party (formerly known as Minjung) Party

== See also ==
- Hanchongnyon
- Minjung
- Undongkwon
- Voice of the People (website)
