= New People's Party (South Korea) =

2017 political party in South Korea

New People's Party 새민중정당
- Founded: 3 September 2017
- Dissolved: 15 October 2017
- Succeeded by: Minjung Party
- Ideology: Progressivism; Korean nationalism
- Political position: Left-wing

The New People's Party (Korean: 새민중정당; Hanja: 새民衆政黨; lit. New People's Political Party) was a South Korean left-wing political party that formed on 3 September 2017. The original name was "Dream of People" (민중의 꿈) as a civic group, but it was changed to its current name by July 2017. The party was planning to combine with the People's United Party, also a left-wing party. Both parties were created by former members of the Unified Progressive Party, which dissolved in 2014. The party gained 2 seats out of 300 in the National Assembly in 2016, both of them from Ulsan.

On 15 October 2017, the combination was done and rebuilt as Minjung Party.
