= People's United Party (South Korea) =

2016–2017 political party in South Korea

People's United Party 민중연합당
- Leader: Son Sol; Lee Gwang-seok; Kang Seung-cheol
- Founded: 27 February 2016
- Dissolved: 15 October 2017
- Succeeded by: Minjung Party
- Headquarters: Hanheung Building, 29-28, Yeongdeungpo-dong 7-ga, Yeongdeungpo District, Seoul
- Membership (2016): 21,712
- Ideology: Progressivism; Left-wing nationalism
- Political position: Left-wing
- Colors: Orange
- Slogan: The hope of the 99% (99%의 희망 99%-ui huimang)

Website
- 99people.kr

- People's United Party
- Hangul: 민중연합당
- Hanja: 民衆聯合黨
- RR: Minjung yeonhapdang
- MR: Minjung yŏnhaptang

Logo of the People's Political Alliance

The People's United Party (Korean: 민중연합당) was a left-wing political party in South Korea that was formed on 27 February 2016. Many of its members came from the Unified Progressive Party.

The party participated in the 2016 South Korean legislative election and the 2017 South Korean presidential election but none of its candidates won.

The party was officially combined with New People's Political Party on 15 October 2017, as the new party named Minjung Party.
