= Unified Progressive Party =

2011–2014 political party in South Korea

Unified Progressive Party 통합진보당
- Leader: Lee Jung-hee
- Founded: 13 December 2011
- Banned: 19 December 2014
- Merger of: People's Participation Party; Democratic Labor Party; New Progressive Party (factions)
- Succeeded by: Justice Party (2012) (Note: factions from People's Participation Party and New Progressive Party); People's Democracy Party (Note: Korea Solidarity); People's United Party (Note: Eastern Gyeonggi Federation et al, later merged into Progressive Party); New People's Party (Note: Ulsan Union et al, later merged into Progressive Party); National Gathering (Note: factions, later merged into the Justice Party)
- Headquarters: Noryangjin-ro 12, Solbom Building 12th floor, Dongjak-gu, Seoul
- Ideology: Progressivism (South Korean)
- Political position: 2011–2012: Centre-left to left-wing; 2012–2014: Left-wing to far-left
- Colours: Purple
- Politics of South Korea; Political parties; Elections; a: By September 2012, the Minjungminju-wing (People's Democracy faction) within the UPP left in large quantities, and the Minjokhaebang-wing (National Liberation faction) (anti-American/pro-North Korean or left-wing nationalists) became the main players.

- Unified Progressive Party
- Hangul: 통합진보당
- Hanja: 統合進步黨
- RR: Tonghap jinbodang
- MR: T'onghap chinbodang

The Unified Progressive Party (UPP; Korean: 통합진보당) is a banned political party in South Korea. It was founded on 13 December 2011 as a merger of the Democratic Labor Party, the People's Participation Party of Rhyu Si-min, and the Solidarity for New Progressive Integration, a faction of the New Progressive Party. Until 12 May 2012 it was jointly chaired by Rhyu Si-min, Lee Jung-hee, and Sim Sang-jung.

== History ==
The UPP proposed an alliance with the major liberal Democratic Party, which the Democrats rejected.

In the 2012 National Assembly election the party gained eight seats for a total of thirteen seats out of 300, advancing to the third position, well ahead of the conservative Liberty Forward Party (which lost most of its seats).

On 24 April 2012, the party provisionally voted to drop the "Unified" component of its name, and adopt the name "Progressive Party". The change was subject to a vote of the party's Central Committee on 13 May. On 3 May 2012, the party internal investigation revealed that wide-ranging irregularities occurred in selecting UPP's proportional representation candidates. UPP won six proportional representatives in 11 April general election, but one legislator resigned amid the election scandal. All four co-leaders of the party subsequently resigned on 12 May.

The South Korean government petitioned the Constitutional Court of Korea to dissolve the UPP due to their alleged pro-North Korea views in November 2013, two months after the UPP members allegedly involved in the 2013 South Korean sabotage plot were arrested. On 19 December 2014 the Constitutional Court of Korea ruled 8–1 in favour of the dissolution. The five UPP lawmakers were also deprived of their National Assembly seats. According to Amnesty International, the UPP's ban raised "serious questions as to the authorities' commitment to freedom of expression and association".

After the dissolution, some of the members joined People's United Party in 2016.

== Political positions ==
Since the United Progressive Party was a big tent party until 2012 and before, there was no consistent ideology except for the motto of a "leftist" party. Before the 2012 party's controversy over fraudulent elections, the United Progressive Party was led by moderates, so some evaluated that "progressivism" was closer to "American (modern) liberalism" than "socialism". However, after 2012, liberals and social democrats within the party left the party, and left-wing nationalists led the party much more, and afterwards were embroiled in controversy over allegations of being "far-left" or "pro-North Korea" (종북).

=== Lee Seok-ki sabotage plot ===
On 5 September 2013, South Korea's intelligence agency, NIS, accused UPP lawmaker Lee Seok-ki of plotting a pro-North Korean rebellion. The case triggered a political and media firestorm in a nation where even praising the North can be considered a crime. He allegedly led a May 2013 meeting, comprised partly of UPP members, in which reference was made to the prospect of attacking South Korean infrastructure in the event that recently heightened tensions between the Koreas led to war.

South Korean prosecutors subsequently indicted Lee on charges of plotting a pro-North Korea rebellion to overthrow the government, saying his plan posed a "grave" national security threat. However, UPP lawmakers say that while the meeting in question did take place, they had no intention of destroying South Korean government infrastructure.

On 17 February 2014, Lee was sentenced by a district court to 12 years in prison.

== Electoral results ==
=== Legislative ===
Election	Leader	Constituency			Party list			Seats	Position	Status
Election	Leader	Votes	%	Seats	Votes	%	Seats	Seats	Position	Status
2012	Lee Jung-hee	1,291,306	5.99	7 / 246	2,198,405	10.31	6 / 54	13 / 300	3rd	Opposition

=== Local ===
Election	Leader	Metropolitan mayor/Governor	Provincial legislature	Municipal mayor	Municipal legislature
2014	Lee Jung-hee	0 / 17	0 / 789	0 / 226	34 / 2,898
