= Kang Do-hyung =

South Korean politician (born 1970)

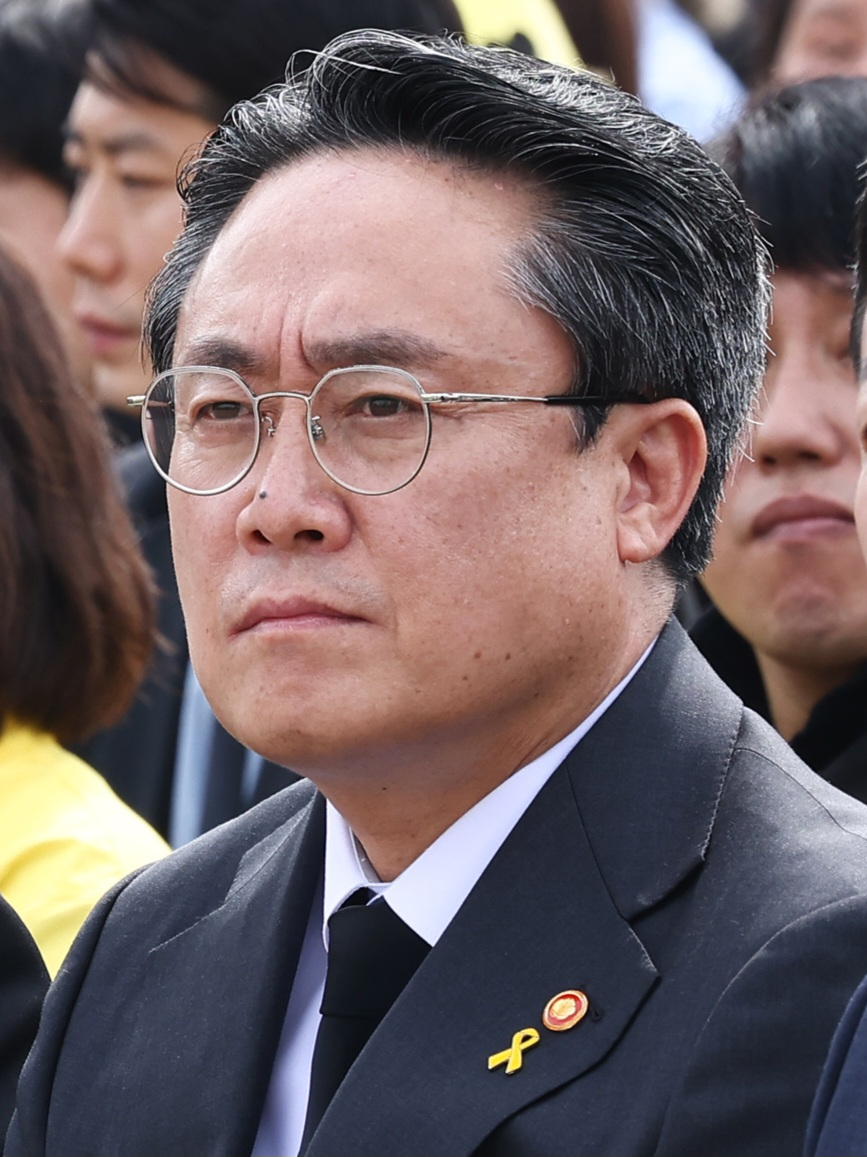
- Kang in 2025

Minister of Oceans and Fisheries
- In office December 29, 2023 – July 23, 2025
- President: Yoon Suk Yeol; Han Duck-soo (acting); Choi Sang-mok (acting); Han Duck-soo (acting); Lee Ju-ho (acting); Lee Jae Myung
- Prime Minister: Han Duck-soo; Choi Sang-mok (acting); Han Duck-soo; Lee Ju-ho (acting); Kim Min-seok
- Preceded by: Cho Seung-hwan
- Succeeded by: Chun Jae-soo

Member of South Korea's National Commission for UNESCO
- In office February 2023 – December 2023

Personal details
- Born: September 30, 1970 (age 56) Jeju Island
- Education: Inha University (BS); Jeju National University (MS, PhD)

Kang Do-hyung (born September 30, 1970) is a South Korean oceanographer who served as the minister of oceans and fisheries from December 2023 to July 2025.

== Biography ==
Kang was born on Jeju Island. He gained a degree from Inha University and his master's and doctoral degrees in Fishery Biology from Jeju National University.

From 2006 to until February 2023 Kang held various positions in the Korea Institute of Ocean Science and Technology. From February to December 2023 he was the president of the institute. His role as president of the Korea Institute of Ocean Science and Technology also made him the director of the Korea Ocean Foundation, chairman of the Korean Oceanographic Commission, and a member of the South Korea's National Commission for UNESCO. Kang became the Minister of Oceans and Fisheries on December 29, 2023, leaving the Ministry on July 23, 2025.
