= North Korean ghost ships =

Derelict boats from North Korea

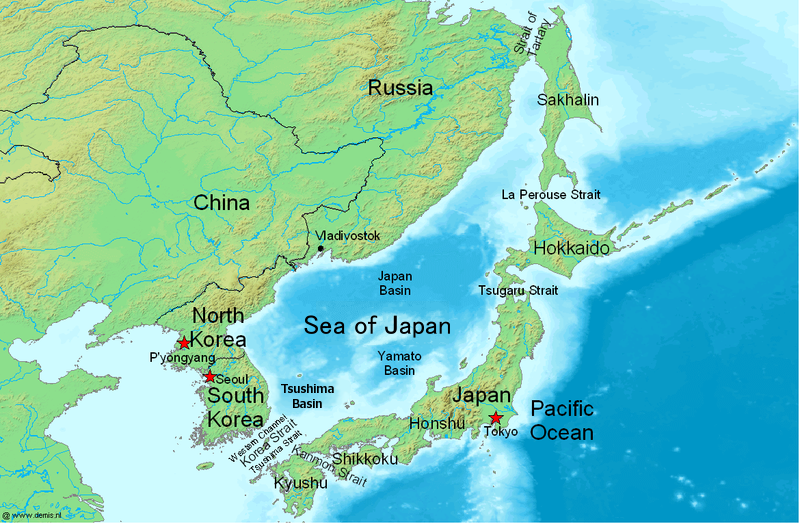
Sea of Japan

Every year, dozens of derelict boats from North Korea wash up on Japanese shores, some carrying the remains of their crew. These "ghost ships" are believed to result when North Korean fishermen are lost at sea and succumb to exposure or starvation. The fishermen often have to travel far out to sea to catch fish due to China's overfishing in North Korean waters.

== Analysis ==
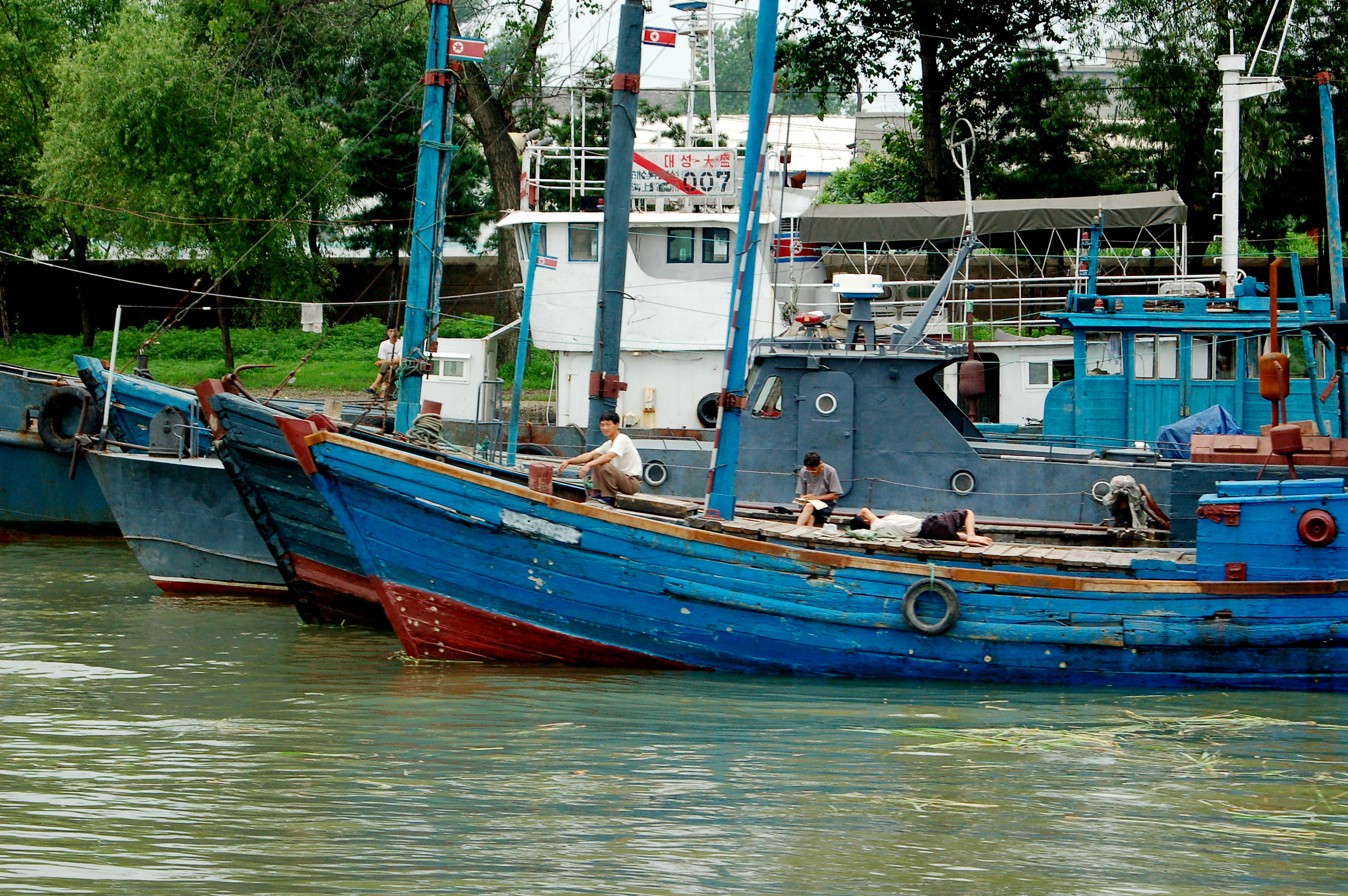
North Korean boats at their home port in Sinuiju, North Korea, as seen from Dandong, China.

Fishing is a dangerous occupation worldwide; for example, the work-related fatality rate for Australian fishermen in one study was 143 per 100,000 man-hours, which was 18 times the Australian national average work-related fatality rate. During the winter, North Korean fishing boats go out searching for king crab, squid and sandfish. Some of the boats appear to be either operated by soldiers or rented by the army to civilians. Fish is one of the main exports from North Korea to China. Wreckage from North Korean boats often washes ashore in northern Japan during winter due to seasonal winds.

Ships washing up without living crewmen typically are old, lack powerful modern engines, and have no GPS. A lack of food may play a role in crew death; with little food on board, exposure and starvation can become significant dangers. Sources in Wajima said the unclaimed bodies are cremated and their ashes stored in a Buddhist compound. The boats are dismantled, destroyed and incinerated.

Scholars such as John Nilsson-Wright of Chatham House find it unlikely that the boats resulted from attempts to defect; given that South Korea has closer cultural and linguistic ties, and is closer to North Korea by boat than Japan is, defection via Japan rather than South Korea by boat is uncommon. An analyst quoted by the South China Morning Post said it is unlikely vessels are being used to infiltrate North Korean agents into Japan, as it would be easier for them to use fake passports and put the agents aboard a flight or a ferry ship to Japan.

Fishing boats with living crew have also washed up on Japanese shores. In November 2017, eight North Korean men and a broken boat were found on Japan's northern coast; the men said they had washed ashore after their boat broke down. There are a few, rare, precedents for defectors ending up near Japan. In 1987, eleven defectors drifted from North Korea to west Japan. In 2006, four defectors floated to northern Japan. In September 2011, nine defectors accidentally made a five-day voyage to Japanese waters in a small boat while attempting to travel to South Korea.

=== Chinese illegal fishing explanation ===
Chinese commercial fishermen have engaged in large-scale squid fishing in North Korean waters in violation of U.N. sanctions which prohibit foreign fishing vessels from fishing in North Korean waters. The Chinese squid fishing fleet in North Korean waters has at times numbered up to 800 vessels and has caused a 70% decline in squid stock in those waters. According to Global Fisheries Watch "This is the largest known case of illegal fishing perpetrated by a single industrial fleet operating in another nation's waters." The decline in the squid stocks as a result of this illegal fishing is also believed to be a contributing factor to the increase in North Korean ghost ships. This is believed to have forced North Korean fishermen to venture further from shore and stay out longer, greatly increasing the risks of an already risky job. The so-called "dark fleet" of Chinese vessels has harvested half a billion dollars' worth of squid in North Korean waters since 2017.

== Statistics ==
- 2011 – First year for which official data is available from the Japanese Coast Guard; the counts from previous years may be similar, but no pre-2011 data is currently available. 57 boats reported in 2011; number of bodies is not disclosed. Because each piece of wreckage is counted as a separate incident, the number of boats may be overstated. Most are believed to be North Korean in origin, due to the typical lettering, the primitive nature of the boats, and occasionally other clues; however, it cannot be ruled out that some of the boats could be from South Korea or elsewhere.
- 2012 – 47 boats reported.
- 2013 – 80 boats reported.
- 2014 – 65 boats reported.
- 2015 – 34 boats reported for the year to date, as of November 27 2015. According to the NHK, the wrecks reported in October and November contain the remains of 25 bodies total. The coast guard stated that the bodies were badly decomposed; one boat contained six skulls, suggesting the boat had been adrift a long time.
- 2016 – Around 24 boats reported to reach the Japanese coast, according to Fox News. Sky News reported 66 or more boats, including boats found drifting off the coast.
- 2017 – 104 boats with at least 31 bodies (and at least 42 survivors) were reported, including a 22-foot wooden boat containing eight skeletonized bodies found in late November. Analysts quoted by Fox News attributed the increase in North Korean ghost ships to North Korean food shortages and to mounting sanctions against Kim Jong Un.
- 2018 – 89 boats with 12 bodies were reported for the year to date, as of 13 November 2018.
- 2019 – At least 156 boats were reported. In one case, seven bodies washed up on the island of Sado on December 28, 2019.

North Korean ghost ships have also been reported in the Russian Far East.

== See also ==
- Fishing industry in North Korea
- Fushin-sen
- Ghost ships
- Illegal, unreported and unregulated fishing
- China's dark fleet
- Iran's ghost fleet
- Myanmar ghost ships
