= Oceans and Fisheries =

Oceans and Fisheries may refer to:

- Ministry of Oceans and Fisheries of South Korea
- Minister of Fisheries and Oceans of Canada
- Department of Fisheries and Oceans of Canada

== See also ==
- List of agriculture ministries
- Aquaculture
- Fishery
- Ocean
