= Ministry of Maritime Affairs and Fisheries =

Ministry of Maritime Affairs and Fisheries can refer to:

- Ministry of Marine Affairs and Fisheries (Indonesia)
- Ministry of Oceans and Fisheries (South Korea)
