= Fishing industry in North Korea =

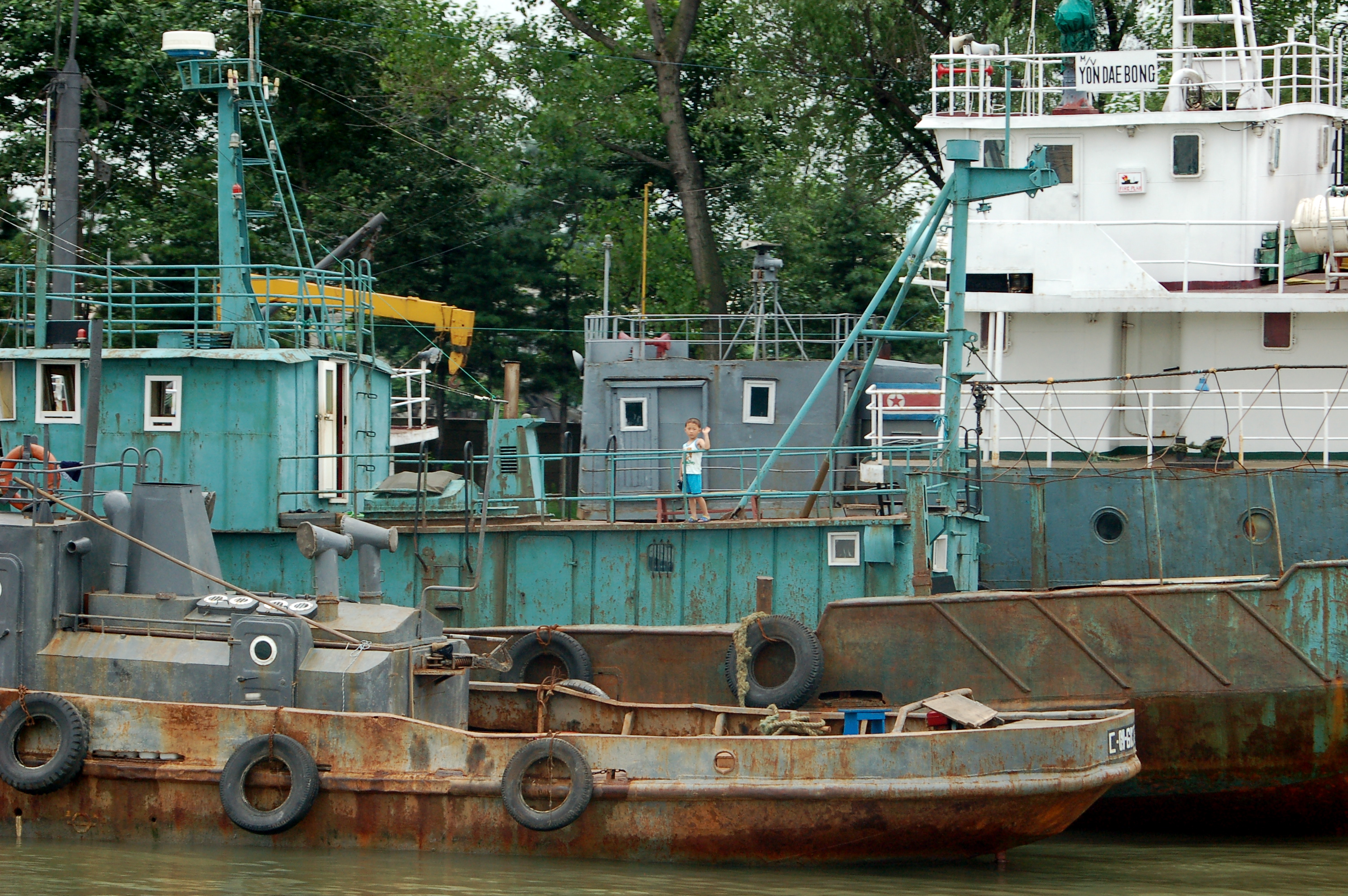
- North Korean fishing vessel in Sinuiju

General characteristics
- Coastline: 2,495 km
- EEZ area: Unknown
- Land area: 120,408 km^{2}
- MPA area: 3.6 km^{2}
- Fishing fleet: Unknown
- Export value: US$300 million (2017 est.)

Harvest
- Wild total: 200,000 tons
- Aquaculture total: 63,700 tons
- Overall total: 263,700 tons

The fishing industry in North Korea is important for diet and for export. For instance, the 2001 catch amounted to 200,000 tons and aquaculture produced 63,700 tons. The major fishing grounds are in the coastal areas of the Sea of Japan to the east and the Yellow Sea to the west. The main fishery ports are Sinpo, Kimchaek, and the nearby deep-sea fishery bases of Yanghwa and Hongwfin. The principal catch from the Sea of Japan is pollock.

Fishing targets in seven-year plans were met until 1993, after which there was a shortage. Present catches are unknown, as is the size of the fishing fleet. Fishing is conducted under military supervision to prevent defections. Military service also affects both men and women. Conscripted men can acquire fishing skills while women are left to work in fish processing plants in their place. North Korea sells fishing quotas in its own EEZ through agents in China. This has forced North Korean fishers to poach in Chinese and Russian waters, where they are ill-equipped to sail. The situation has resulted in numerous shipwrecks, particularly in the Japanese archipelago where "ghost ships" with their dead crew has washed ashore.

== Geography ==
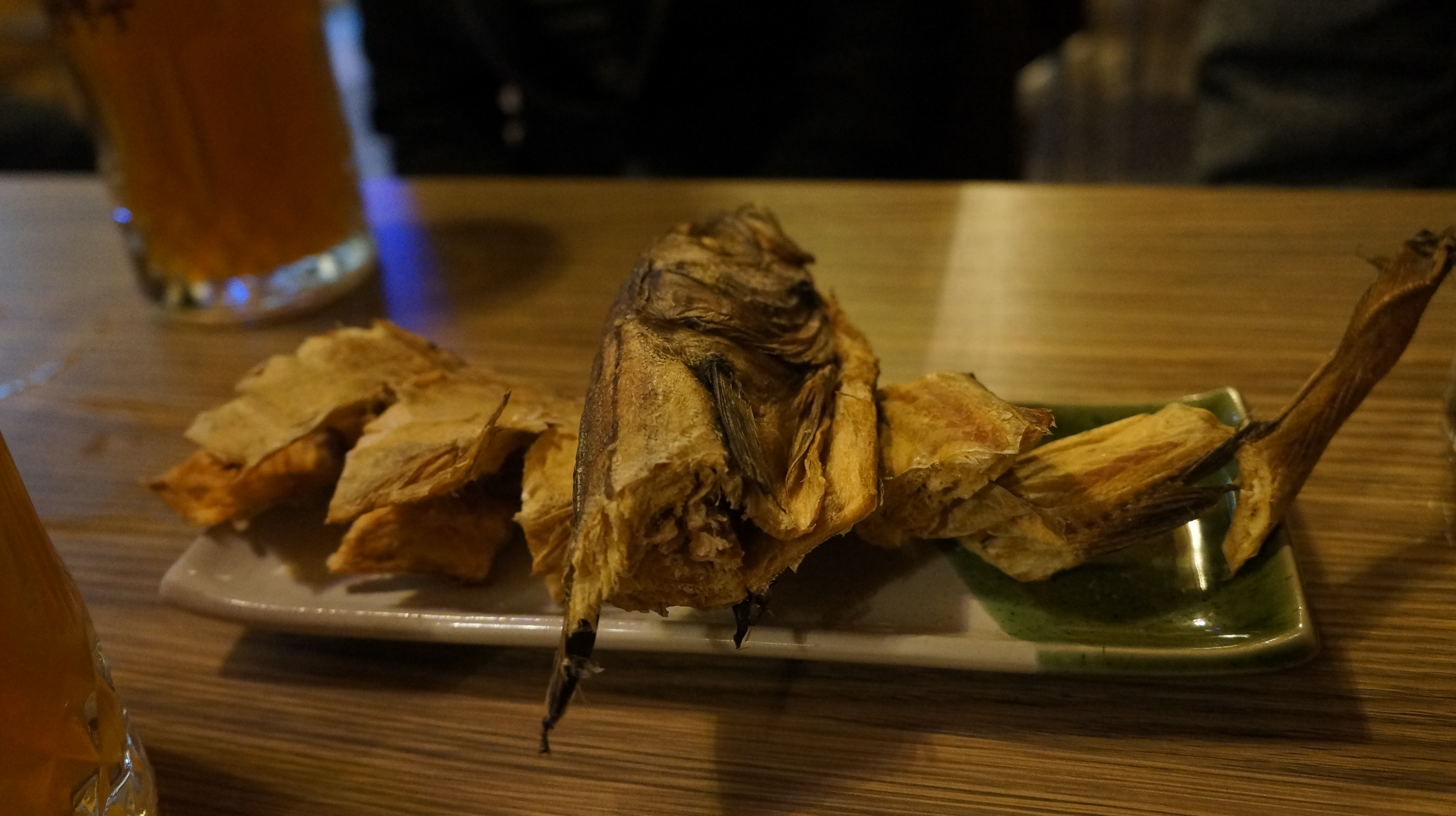
Anju at a North Korean bar. Pollock is a favorite fish of Koreans and the principal catch of North Korea.

North Korea's coastline of about 2,495 kilometers, mixture of warm and cold ocean currents, and many rivers, lakes, and streams make its potential for fishery development better than for most other countries.

The major fishing grounds are in the coastal areas of the Sea of Japan to the east and the Yellow Sea to the west. The principal catch from the Sea of Japan is pollock. Sardine and squid catches are also significant. From the west coast, yellow corvina and hairtail are the most common varieties of fish. Deep-sea catches include herring, mackerel, yellowtail. Shellfish and mollusks are caught too.

As of 1980, there are more than thirty state-run fishery stations and about three-fourths of them are located on the east coast. The main fishery ports are Sinpo, Kimchaek, and the nearby deep-sea fishery bases of Yanghwa and Hongwfin. Most large-scale storage and canning facilities also are located on the east coast as well. Besides the fishery stations, smaller fishery cooperatives are located along both coasts in traditional fishing centers. Aquaculture and freshwater fishing take place on regular cooperative farms.

== History ==
A major expansion of technical schools was undertaken since the 1950s, with specialized courses including fishing. Not until the early 1960s, however, did the domestic fishing industry begin to expand rapidly, receiving increased investment in vessels, equipment, and port facilities. Deep-sea fishing began in earnest in the 1970s.

Total marine products increased from 465,000 tons in 1960 to 1.14 million tons in 1970, registering an annual growth rate of 9.4 percent compared with the planned rate of 14.5 percent. The Six-Year Plan target of 1 .6 million tons was met in 1976.

In 1977 the government reorganized the fishery administration and pledged to continue improving port facilities and building bigger and better trawlers and processing ships. Improvements were slated for the fishery centers and deep-sea stations, and fishery cooperatives were reportedly given more autonomy to use their profits as they thought best. The government also urged the expansion of processing and storage facilities at the local level. In 1980 the largest stern-trawlers were of the 3,750-ton class, but most processing mother ships were imported. The completion of one 24,000-ton mother ship in celebration of the Sixth Congress of the Workers' Party of Korea was an indication of the government's commitment to improving the fishing industry in the Second Seven-Year Plan. The projected budget for 1980 called for a 70 percent increase in direct government investment in fisheries. The target for 1984 – 3.5 million tons of marine and freshwater fishery products, of which 2.7 million tons represented the fish catch – was met. Through the 1970s and 1980s, in a bit to boot production by ideological means, Three Revolutions teams were sent to fishing villages for on-the-spot guidance and problem solving in close consultation with local personnel.

The output target for the Third Seven-Year Plan was 11 million tons by 1993, including a catch of 3 million tons of fish. In order to expand marine products, the Third Seven-Year Plan called for modernizing the fishery industry. Specifically, the plan urged increasing the numbers of 14,000-ton class processing ships, 3,750-ton class stern-trawlers, and 1,000-ton and 480-ton class fishing vessels, as well as generally increasing the size of vessels. The government also called for widespread introduction of modern fishing implements and rationalizing the fishery labor system. Improvements also are slated for expanding and modernizing the cold-storage and processing facilities in order to facilitate speedy processing of catches. With an estimated total output of 1.5 million tons in 1990, down from 1.6 million tons in 1989, it was estimated that the 1993 target for marine products would not be met. The slow progress in state investment, combined with the shortages of oil, are the main factors in the disappointing record of marine output in the late 1980s and early 1990s. At that time, veritable shortages of fish occurred.

The catch in 2001 totaled 200,000 tons of wild-caught freshwater and saltwater fish, shellfish, and mollusks and about 63,700 tons produced using aquaculture. The exact numbers of present catches are unknown. Unlike most countries, North Korea does not report its annual catch to the Food and Agriculture Organization (FAO), of which it is a member.

== Fleet ==
The exact numbers of the fishing fleet, thought to be in poor condition, are not known. In 1998, North Korea had eight large fishing vessels (3,750 displacement tonnage, 2,759 gross tons, 83 m length, 2,250 horsepower) and 1,545 small vessels (485 displacement tonnage, 267 gross tons, 39 m length, 400 horsepower). Numbers of smaller vessels were not reported.

== Export and international relations ==
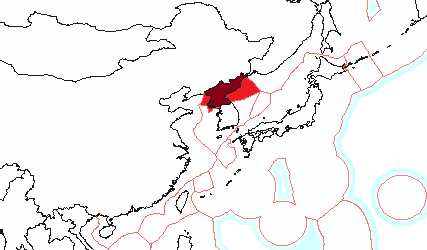
Exclusive economic zone (EEZ) of North Korea

Fish is an important export commodity to North Korea. Fish and seafood are particularly exported to China. The United Nations Security Council sanctions from 2017 banned North Korean exports of seafood. Prior to the ban, North Korean exports of seafood were estimated at US$300 million annually.

According to a 1988 agreement with the United Nations Development Programme, North Korea was to receive assistance in construction of a fish farm.

The first joint venture North Korea established with China, in 1989, was a marine fishery products firm located in Chongjin that had an initial capitalization of US$1 million.

Thousands of North Korean vessels fish in the waters of Russia and Japan annually. Typically small boats unsuited for the high seas, they are sometimes shipwrecked, on Russian shores, but particularly on the Japanese archipelago. The boats, usually carrying a dead crew, have been dubbed "ghost ships". Several reasons have been suggested for their accumulation on the Japanese shores including weather patters, poor condition of the fleet, and originating from Russian and Chinese waters where they have been ill-equipped to sail. Poaching in Russian waters was limited to the southern end of the Russian EEZ until the late 2010s when poachers moved further north.

North Korea conducts fishing in its own EEZ, the extent of which is unknown because North Korea has not passed a law on it, mainly for the industrial sector. Some fishing for the artisanal sector takes place, too. Subsistence fishing has declined considerably over the years.

A 2000 agreement between non-governmental fishing organizations of North and South Korea allowed South Koreans to fish inside the North Korean EEZ in the Sea of Japan until 2005. About 400 South Korean fishing vessels conducted fishing in the area.

North Korea sells fishing quotas to its EEZ to foreigners through agents China. North Korean fishermen who are deprived of quotas to the EEZ then resort to poaching in the waters of China and Russia.

== Social issues ==
Fish is important to the diet of North Koreans. Pollock is considered a favorite fish of most Koreans. Food stores in self-sufficient urban neighborhoods typically sell fish. The only exception to controlled markets is the peasant market, where surplus fish is sold at free-market prices based on supply and demand.

In the public distribution system of North Korea, ocean fishermen and others doing heavy work are allotted more grain than government and party officials engaged in less strenuous physical activities.

Fishing boats may be owned by cooperative organizations – instead of directly by the state – according to the constitution of North Korea. Young people might have simple fishing equipment to fish recreationally.

The Coastal Security Bureau is responsible for policing and protecting the nation's fishing areas. At the county level, the county Cooperative Farm Management Committees include fishery agents if there are fisheries in the county.

The military of North Korea is related to fishing in many ways. Not only is it heavily involved in fishing, but conscription affects how people relate to the economic sector in complex ways. Fishing is conducted under military supervision to prevent defections. Fishermen hand over their catch to the production unit they are assigned to, which in turn gives the fish to the military. The military uses it to feed troops, who are in line with the Songun ("military-first") policy privileged for food. Men in North Korea have to spend several years conscripted in the military. For them, it improves the chances of getting a good job after discharge. A sailor trained as a radio operator, for example, later might be assigned as the radio operator on a civilian fishing boat. They may also have experience due to the fact that soldiers have to supplement their rations, fishing being one way to do so. For women, the long absence of men from the workforce causes hardship. Women have for instance had to work in their place in fish-processing plants in temperatures well below freezing.

A struggle over the control of fisheries between the military and Jang Song-thaek was the final straw leading to the latter's downfall and purge in 2013.

== See also ==
- Economy of North Korea
- Illegal, unreported and unregulated fishing
- North Korean cuisine
- North Korean ghost ships
