= Chun Jae-soo =

South Korean politician (born 1971)

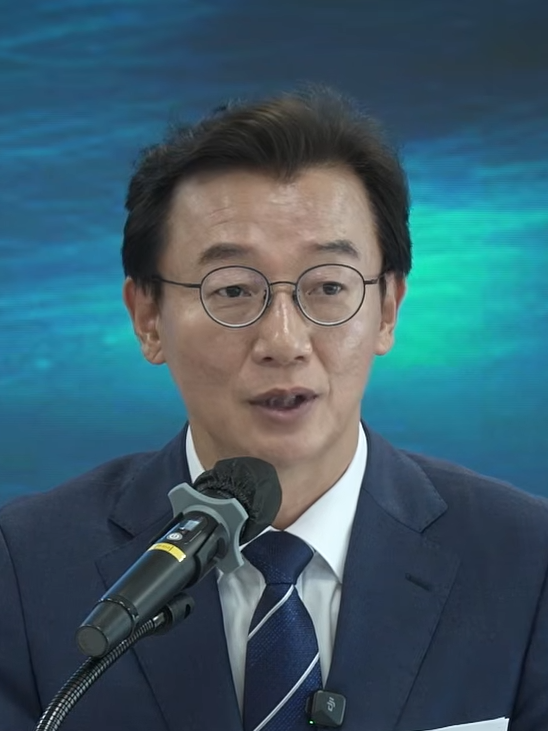
- Chun in 2026

Mayor of Busan
- Incumbent
- Assumed office 1 July 2026
- Preceded by: Park Heong-joon

Minister of Oceans and Fisheries
- In office 23 July 2025 – 11 December 2025
- President: Lee Jae Myung
- Prime Minister: Kim Min-seok
- Preceded by: Kang Do-hyung
- Succeeded by: Kim Sung-bum (acting); Hwang Jong-woo

Member of the National Assembly
- In office 30 May 2016 – 29 April 2026
- Preceded by: Park Min-shik
- Succeeded by: Han Dong-hoon
- Constituency: Busan Buk–Gangseo A (2016–2024); Busan Buk A (2024–2026)

Personal details
- Born: April 1971 (age 55) Uiryeong County, South Korea
- Party: Democratic Party of Korea
- Other political affiliations: Democratic United Party
- Education: Dongguk University

Chun Jae-soo (Korean: 전재수; born 1971) is a South Korean politician who has served as the mayor of Busan since 2026. A member of the Democratic Party of Korea (DPK), he served as a member of the National Assembly from 2016 to 2025 and as the minister of oceans and fisheries in 2025.

== Biography ==
Chun was born in April 1971 in Uiryeong County. He gained a bachelor's and master's degrees from Dongguk University.

Chun was Chief Secretary of the Second Presidential Secretariat. Chun unsuccessfully attempted to be elected to the National Assembly in the 18th and 19th general elections as a member of the Democratic United Party, but was elected to the National Assembly in the 20th National Assembly as a member of the Democratic Party of Korea. Chun served three terms in the National Assembly. Chun was nominated to become the Minister of Oceans and Fisheries in June 2025.

Chun resigned from the ministry due to allegations regarding Chun receiving illegal payments from the Unification Church on 11 December 2025. According to Yun Young-ho, the former head of the Unification Church's global headquarters, Chun was alleged to have received 20 million won and a luxury watch in 2018 and another watch and more won in 2020 in exchange for help getting approval for an undersea tunnel between South Korea and Japan. Police questioned him for more than 14 hours. A task force of prosecution and police officials refused to prosecute Chun due to a lack of evidence. The task force indicted 4 of Chun's aides for destroying evidence.

Chun became the Democratic Party of Korea's candidate for the mayor of Busan on 9 April 2026. He won the mayoral election on 4 June, defeating the People Power Party nominee and incumbent mayor Park Heong-joon.

== Election results ==
=== General elections ===
Year	Elections	Constituency	Political party	Votes (%)	Results
2008	18th National Assembly General Election	Buk–Gangseo A (Busan)	UDP	20,322 (38.57%)	Defeated (2nd)
2012	19th National Assembly General Election	Buk–Gangseo A (Busan)	DUP	35,069 (47.60%)	Defeated (2nd)
2016	20th National Assembly General Election	Buk–Gangseo A (Busan)	Democratic	48,887 (55.92%)	Won
2020	21st National Assembly General Election	Buk–Gangseo A (Busan)	Democratic	48,733 (50.58%)	Won
2024	22nd National Assembly General Election	Buk A (Busan)	Democratic	43,548 (52.31%)	Won

=== Local elections ===
==== Mayor of Busan ====
Year	Elections	Constituency	Political party	Votes (%)	Remarks
2026	9th Iocal Election	Busan (Mayoral Elections)	Democratic	885,608 (50.52%)	Won

==== Mayor of Busan Buk ====
Year	Elections	Constituency	Political party	Votes (%)	Remarks
2006	4th Iocal Election	Mayor of Busan Buk	Uri	32,917 (32.80%)	Defeated (2nd)

National Assembly of the Republic of Korea
Preceded by Park Min-shik	Member of the National Assembly from Buk–Gangseo A (Busan); 30 May 2016–29 May 2024	Succeeded by Himself (Buk A, Busan); Park Seong-hoon (Buk B, Busan)
Preceded by Himself (Buk–Gangseo A, Busan); Kim Do-eup (Buk–Gangseo B, Busan)	Member of the National Assembly from Buk A (Busan); 30 May 2024–29 April 2026	Succeeded by Han Dong-hoon
Political offices
Preceded by Kang Do-hyung	Minister of Oceans and Fisheries; 24 July 2025–11 December 2025	Succeeded by Kim Sung-bum (Acting); Hwang Jong-woo
Preceded by Park Heong-joon	Mayor of Busan; 1 July 2026–	Incumbent
