= Cho Sung-hwan =

Cho Sung-hwan may refer to:

- Cho Seong-hwan (independence activist) (born 1875), Korean independence activist
- Cho Seung-hwan, South Korean politician
- Cho Sung-hwan (cyclist) (born 1943), South Korean cyclist
- Jo Sung-hwan (born 1970), South Korean football player and manager
- Cho Sung-hwan (baseball) (born 1976), South Korean baseball player
- Cho Sung-hwan (footballer, born 1982), South Korean football player
- Cho Sung-hwan (footballer, born 1985), South Korean football player
