= Battle of Amami-Ōshima =

2001 armed naval confrontation between Japan and North Korea

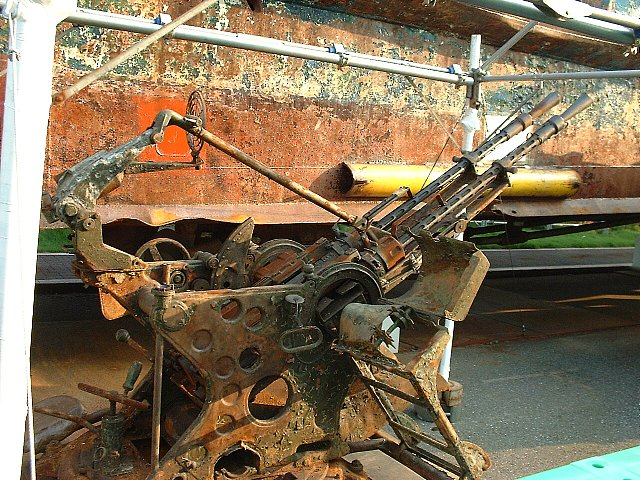
- A ZPU-2 anti-aircraft gun that was mounted on the North Korean spy vessel
Date	22 December 2001
Location	Off the coast of Amami-Ōshima, in the East China Sea
Result	Japanese victory

Belligerents
North Korea	Japan

Units involved
Korean People's Navy	Japan Coast Guard

Strength
1 naval trawler	2–3 patrol boats 70 men

Casualties and losses
15 killed 1 naval trawler sunk	3 wounded 1 patrol boat damaged

The Battle of Amami-Ōshima, known in Japan as the Spy Ship Incident in the Southwest Sea of Kyūshū (九州南西海域工作船事件, kyūshū-nansei-kaiiki-kōsakusen-jiken), was a naval confrontation between Japan and North Korea. It took place in waters within Japan's exclusive economic zone, off the coast of Amami Ōshima, in the East China Sea on 22 December 2001.

After a six-hour firefight, the North Korean vessel was deliberately sunk by its crew of 15, which had survived the initial sinking but were not rescued. The Japanese authorities later announced that the vessel was a spy craft.

== Background ==
An unidentified ship was spotted in Japanese waters on 21 December 2001. The armed trawler was detected by a communications station in Kikaijima, Kagoshima, which was under control of the Japanese Defense Intelligence Headquarters.

In 1999, another North Korean vessel encountered by the Japanese Coast Guard was claimed by Japan to have been a spy craft, though North Korea denied it.

These North Korean vessels are known as fushin-sen (lit. 'suspicious ship') in Japan, they are suspected of criminal activity officially sanctioned by the North Korean government, such as poaching or the smuggling of people and drugs. Encounters with such vessels that intruded into Japanese waters usually resulted in the vessels fleeing before Japanese authorities could respond.

== Battle ==
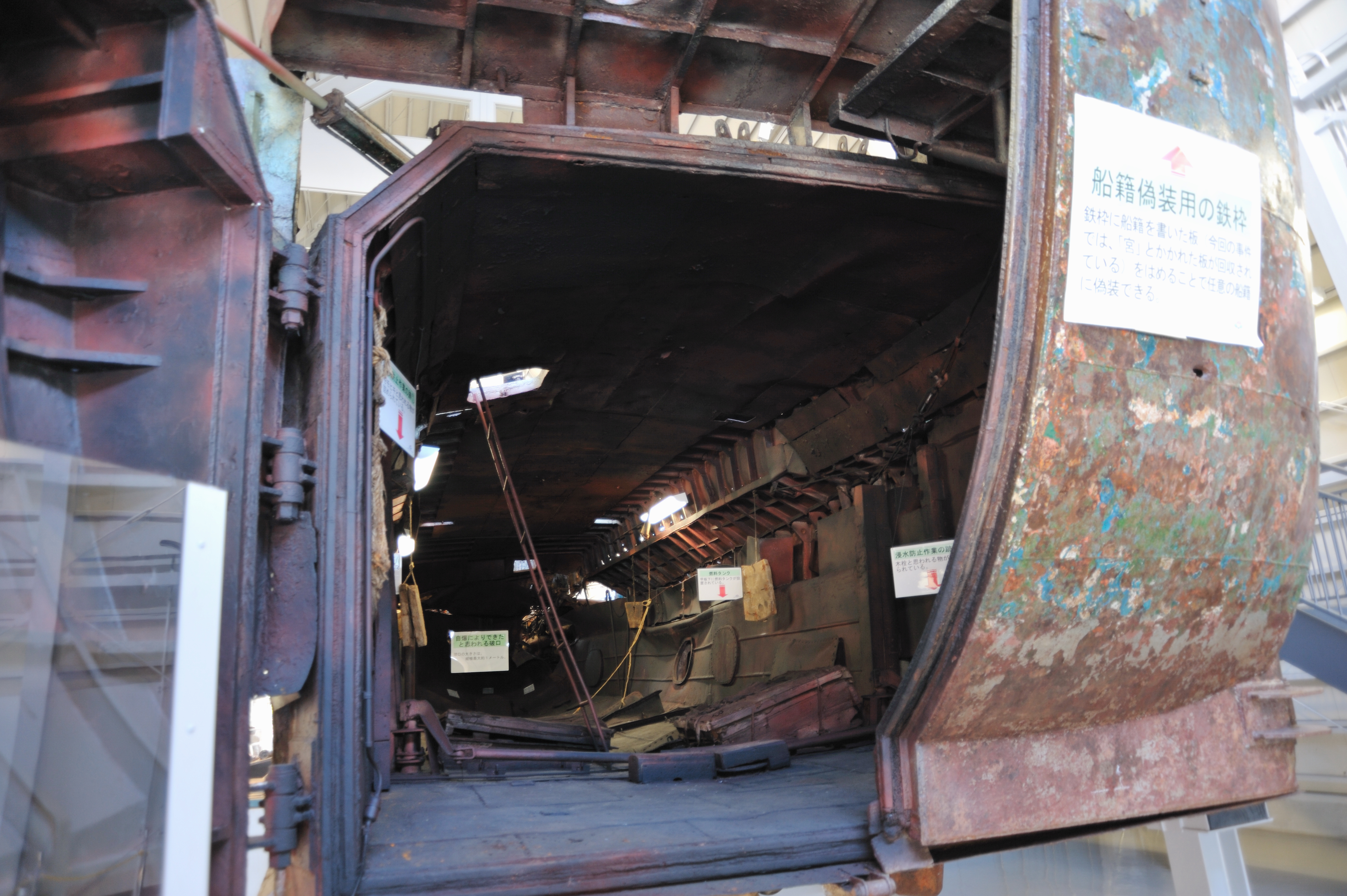
Dual hatch found in the stern of the North Korean spy trawler

Early the following morning, the ship was chased by four Japanese Coast Guard vessels, who ordered it to halt using signal flares, signal flags, signal lamps as well as multilingual loudspeaker and radio broadcasts. When North Korean crewmen on deck fired upon patrol boats coming alongside the trawler, the JCG returned fire with 25 warning shots. A six-hour firefight then ensued, in which over 1,000 rounds were fired by both sides; the North Korean crew also fired rocket propelled grenades. One JCG patrol boat was damaged and 3 sailors were wounded.

The North Korean trawler was hit by a number of 20 mm (0.79 in) rounds fired from a JM61-RFS rotary cannon. The Japanese aimed for the trawler's stern in an attempt to disable its engines. According to The Guardian, such rounds are usually not considered to be powerful enough to sink a ship. Several explosions not directly attributed to Japanese attacks rocked the ship before it was sunk, Japanese authorities believe that the vessel was deliberately sunk by its crew. The Guardian reported that "fifteen survivors were seen clinging to a buoy in heavy seas, but the Japanese ships were ordered to ignore them because of fears that they would use force to resist capture". Two bodies were recovered, thirteen more persons were declared missing and presumed dead several days later. According to the then-navigational officer on board JCGS Inasa, the ship positioned itself upwind of the sinking suspicious ship and dropped lifebuoys, but no survivors were recovered.

The Special Boarding Unit was mobilized to board the ship, but did not do so as they had to wait for official orders from the Japanese Defense Agency. The ship sank before such orders arrived.

== Aftermath ==
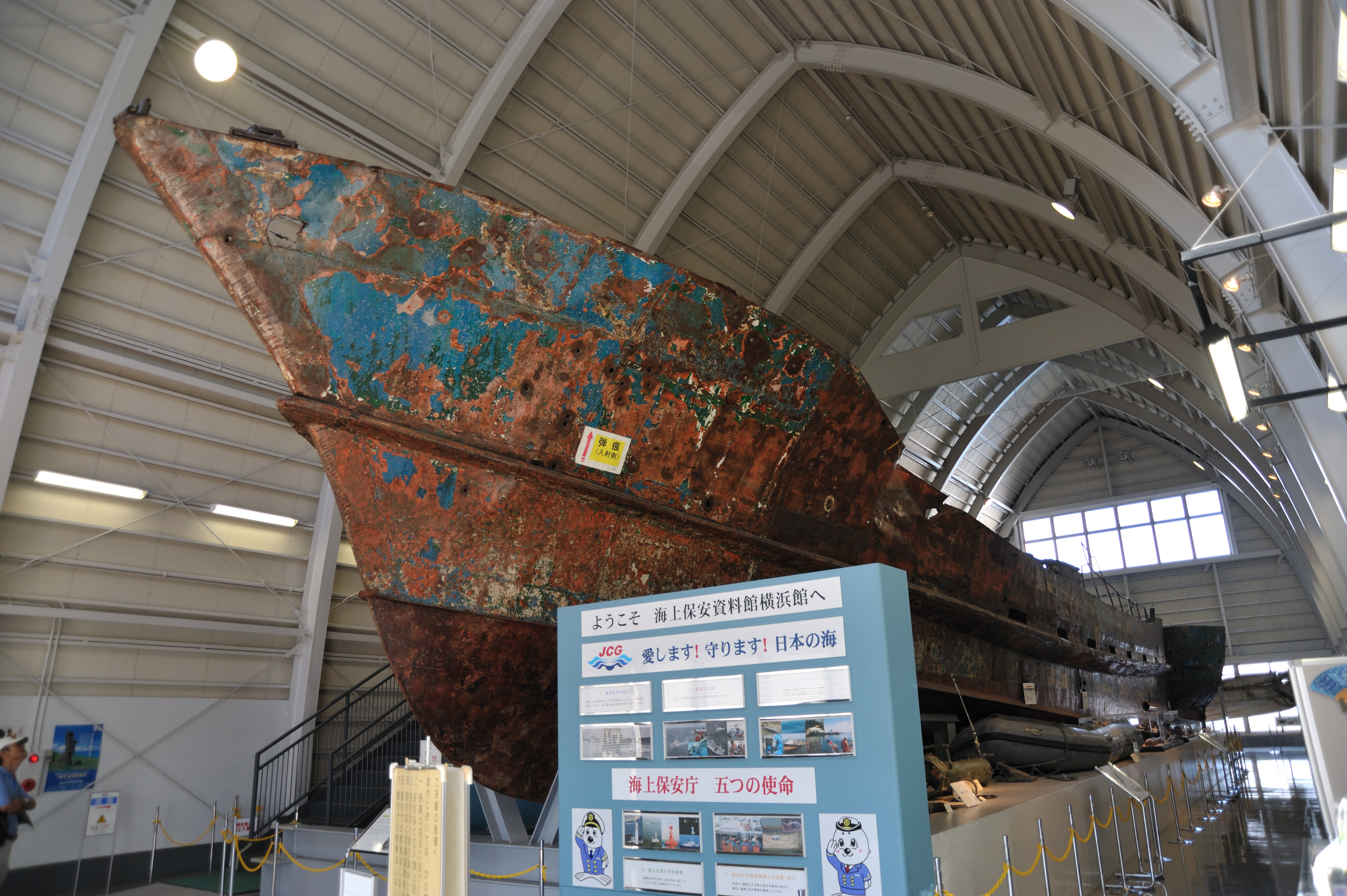
- Changyu 3705 at the JCG Museum

History

North Korea
- Name: Changyu 3705
- Out of service: 10 December 2001
- Fate: Sunk by Japan Coast Guard

General characteristics
- Class & type: Fushin-sen
- Displacement: 44 tons
- Length: 29.68 m (97.4 ft)
- Beam: 4.66 m (15.3 ft)
- Draught: 2.30 m (7 ft 7 in)
- Propulsion: 4 Russian High-Speed Diesel Engines
- Speed: 33 kn (61 km/h; 38 mph)
- Range: 1,200nm (2,200 km)
- Complement: 10
- Armament: 14.5mm anti-aircraft gun
- Notes: Bow and super structure similar to a long-liner, but with a hard chined V-bottom hull and a hidden well deck in the stern.

In 2002, following the Japan–North Korea Pyongyang Declaration, Kim Jong-il apologized for the North Korean abductions of Japanese citizens, and promised to halt the operation of spy ships in Japanese waters.

In 2003 the trawler was raised by the Japanese to confirm its origin and intentions. Inspection of the hull determined it was of North Korean origin and most likely an infiltration and spy vessel. It was revealed that the vessel was camouflaged as a Chinese or Japanese fishing boat and that it could reach a speed of 33 knots (61 km/h; 38 mph), far faster than any commercial trawler. The ship also contained a hidden double-hatch located in the stern to be used as an exit door for speedboats.

Once the inspections were completed, the hull was displayed at the Japanese Coast Guard Museum Yokohama in Yokohama, where the trawler became a popular tourist attraction. The Nippon Foundation proposed to the JCG to keep the damaged hull to educate the public instead of scrapping it.

Among the items found in the trawler include anti-aircraft guns, a B-10 recoilless rifle, an SA-16 MANPAD, RPG-7s, a PKM machine gun and Type 88 assault rifles.

== See also ==
- Fushin-sen – Battle of Amami-Ōshima is one of the most notable Fushin-sen type of incidents
