= Exclusive economic zone of South Korea =

South Korean maritime boundary

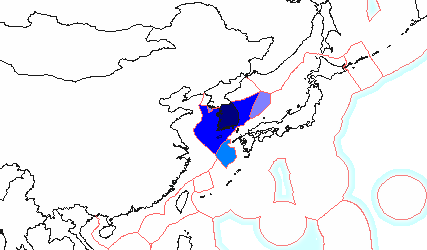
Exclusive economic zone of South Korea

Exclusive economic zone of South Korea (대한민국의 배타적 경제 수역) is the 63rd largest EEZ in the world and covers an area of 288,045 square kilometers. The area of the EEZ of the entire Korean Peninsula is 4.38 million square kilometers.

== History ==
Joseon produced maps of the Yellow Sea, the South Sea, and the East Sea which surround the Korean Peninsula, with ancient maps such as Honilgangri Great Country Map and the Hangul Chosun Exhibition Map. These old maps accurately indicate Joseon's sovereignty over Ulleungdo and Dokdo.

During the period of Joseon and the Korean Empire, Western imperialist countries such as Britain, Russia, and France measured the seas on the Korean Peninsula without prior authorization of Korea. And the Japanese Empire obtained the right to survey the seas through the Treaty of Ganghwa.

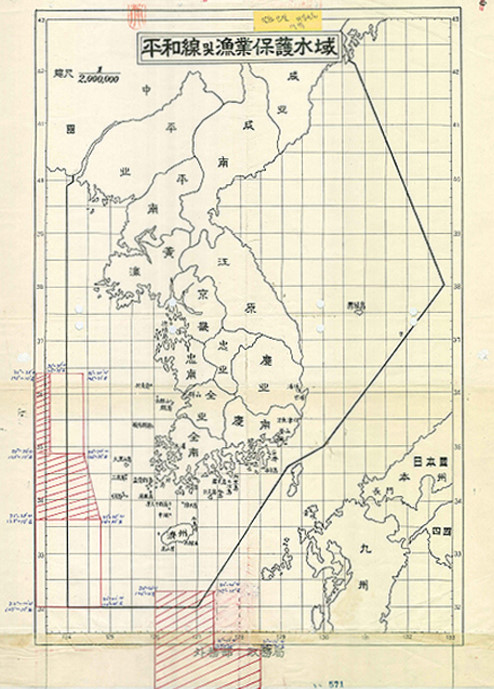
Syngman Rhee Line

After Korea under Japanese rule era and United States Army Military Government in Korea era, First Republic of Korea was established in 1948, and the Korean government began to manage exclusive economic zones in earnest. The first political declaration that embodied this was President Rhee's Syngman Rhee Line. It was declared on January 18, 1952, to cope with the illegal fishing activities of Japanese fishermen and the invasion of Dokdo. The background of this declaration of the Peace Line is not irrelevant to the fact that in the 1950s, Japanese fishing boats formed large-scale boats in the southwest waters of the Korean Peninsula, centered on Jeju Island and Heuksando. At that time, conflicts between the Korea Coast Guard and Japanese fishermen frequently occurred, and the Daihomaru incident also occurred in this context.

In 1965, President Park Chung-hee signed the Korea-Japan Fisheries Agreement as an annex to the to improve relations with Japan and established standards for maritime territory. However, the boundary between the exclusive economic zone between the Republic of Korea and Japan was not finally established, and the area near Dokdo was designated as a common fishing zone.

The Republic of Korea ratified the United Nations Convention on the Law of the Sea which was adopted in 1983 in February 1994 after the joint accession of the two Koreas to the United Nations and entered into force in November of the same year. Through this, the Republic of Korea can establish EEZ under international law like other UN member states. In 1996, the exclusive economic zone of the Republic of Korea was declared, and the Prime Minister's Order No. 158: "Regulations on the Exercise of Rights in Exclusive Economic Zone" was enacted.

== Geography ==
Regions and Sea	Size of the EEZ (km^{2})
Jeju Island	120,000km^{2}
Ulleungdo, Dokdo	50,000km^{2}~60,000km^{2}
East Sea	86,000km^{2}
Namhae	130,000km^{2}
Yellow Sea	77,000km^{2}~90,000km^{2}
Total	463,000km^{2}~486,000km^{2}

== Tensions with its neighbors ==
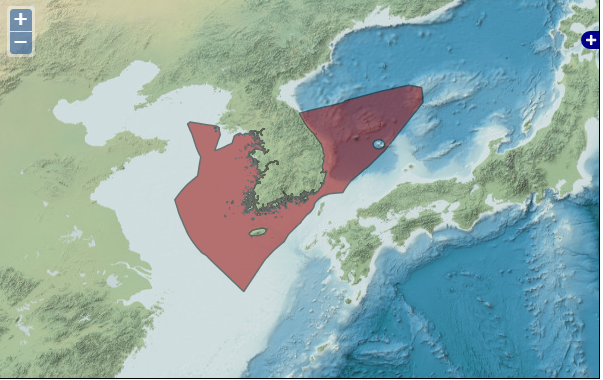
EEZ of South Korea

=== Japan ===
On January 23, 1998, Japan unilaterally canceled the existing Korea-Japan Fisheries Agreement, taking advantage of the launch of the Korean government in Kim Dae Jung and Korea's request for IMF bailout. After Japan's unilateral destruction, the two countries concluded the Shinhan-Il Fisheries Agreement on September 25, 1998 after negotiations. The signing of the Shinhan-Il Fisheries Agreement established intermediate waters in the South Sea and the East Sea and regulated the fishing activities of fishing boats from both countries.

Apart from the New Korea-Japan Fisheries Agreement, Japan continues to cause tensions with Dokdo. In particular, Japan claims that Dokdo is recognized as belonging to Shimane Prefecture in the Honshu Chugoku region of Japan, and its textbooks state that the Republic of Korea illegally occupies Dokdo. And Dokdo is listed as its territory in the official document of the Japanese government which is often criticized by Korean government,

=== North Korea ===
The Northern Limit Line (NLL) in the Yellow Sea

North Korea is very sensitive to the sea boundary line established between the 5th West Sea of the Republic of Korea and the coast of South Hwanghae Province of the Democratic People's Republic of Korea. North Korea had not expressed its position until the 2000s, but changed its position and unilaterally rejected the existing Northern Limit Line and insisted on a new military demarcation line in the West Sea of Joseon. However, the Republic of Korea did not accept this. Tensions between the two countries led to a substantial armed conflict between the two Koreas, leading to the 1st Yeonpyeong Naval War, the 2nd Yeonpyeong Naval War, and the Daecheong Naval War.

=== China ===
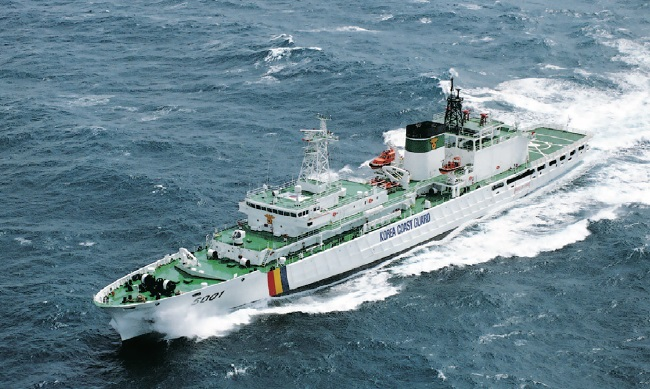
Korea Coast Guard

In 1998, two years after the Republic of Korea declared its exclusive economic zone in 1996, China also declared its own exclusive economic zone. Thus, since the maritime boundary between the two countries was not clearly distinguished, it was agreed to establish the maritime boundary through the signing of the Korea-China Fisheries Agreement in 2000. However, it was agreed to establish the overlapping waters of the two countries in the Yellow Sea as a provisional measure zone. However, due to the unclear boundary, illegal fishing activities of Chinese fishing boats frequently occur in the waters of the Republic of Korea. Although the Korean Coast Guard continues to crack down on these illegal Chinese fishing boats, there is no effective countermeasure against the Chinese fleet crossing the Northern Limit Line to avoid crackdown.

== Economy ==
South Korea conducts fishing in its EEZ, mainly for the industrial sector. A 2000 agreement between non-governmental fishing organizations of North and South Korea allowed South Koreans to fish inside the North Korean EEZ in the Sea of Japan until 2005. About 400 South Korean fishing vessels conducted fishing in the area.

== See also ==
- Economy of South Korea
- Exclusive economic zone of North Korea
- Geography of South Korea
- List of border incidents involving North and South Korea
- China-South Korea border
