= Special Boarding Unit =

- 特別警備隊
- Active: March 27, 2001 – present
- Country: Japan
- Branch: Japan Maritime Self-Defense Force
- Type: Special forces
- Role: Special operations VBSS
- Size: Classified, estimated at 90 operators in 2007
- Part of: Self Defense Fleet
- Garrison/HQ: Etajima, Hiroshima
- Nicknames: SBU; Tokketai (In Japanese)
- Engagements: Battle of Amami-Ōshima (Did not intervene); Counter-piracy operations in Somalia

Commanders
- Current commander: Kazuhiro Kuroki
- Notable commanders: Toru Yamaguchi

Insignia
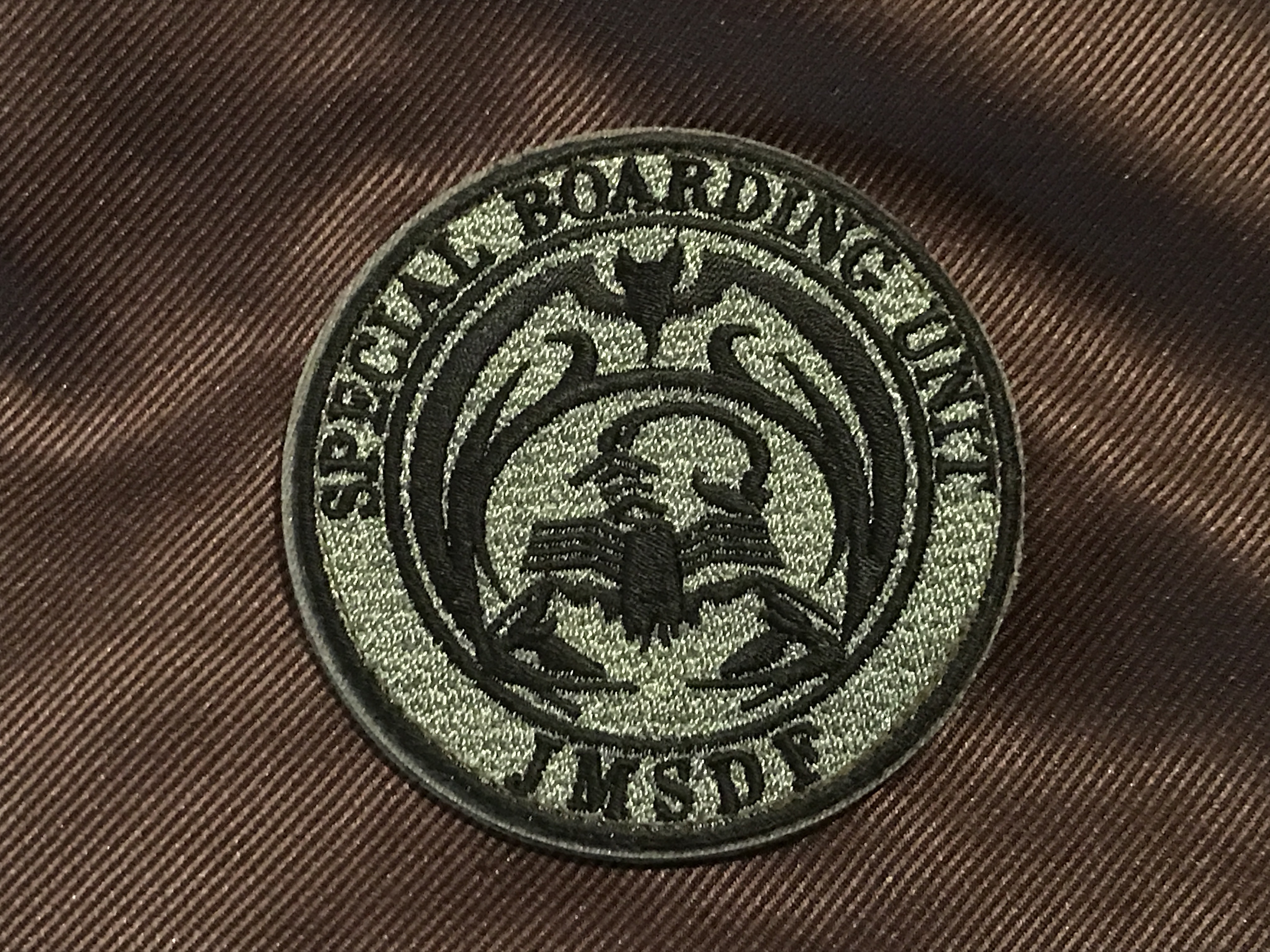
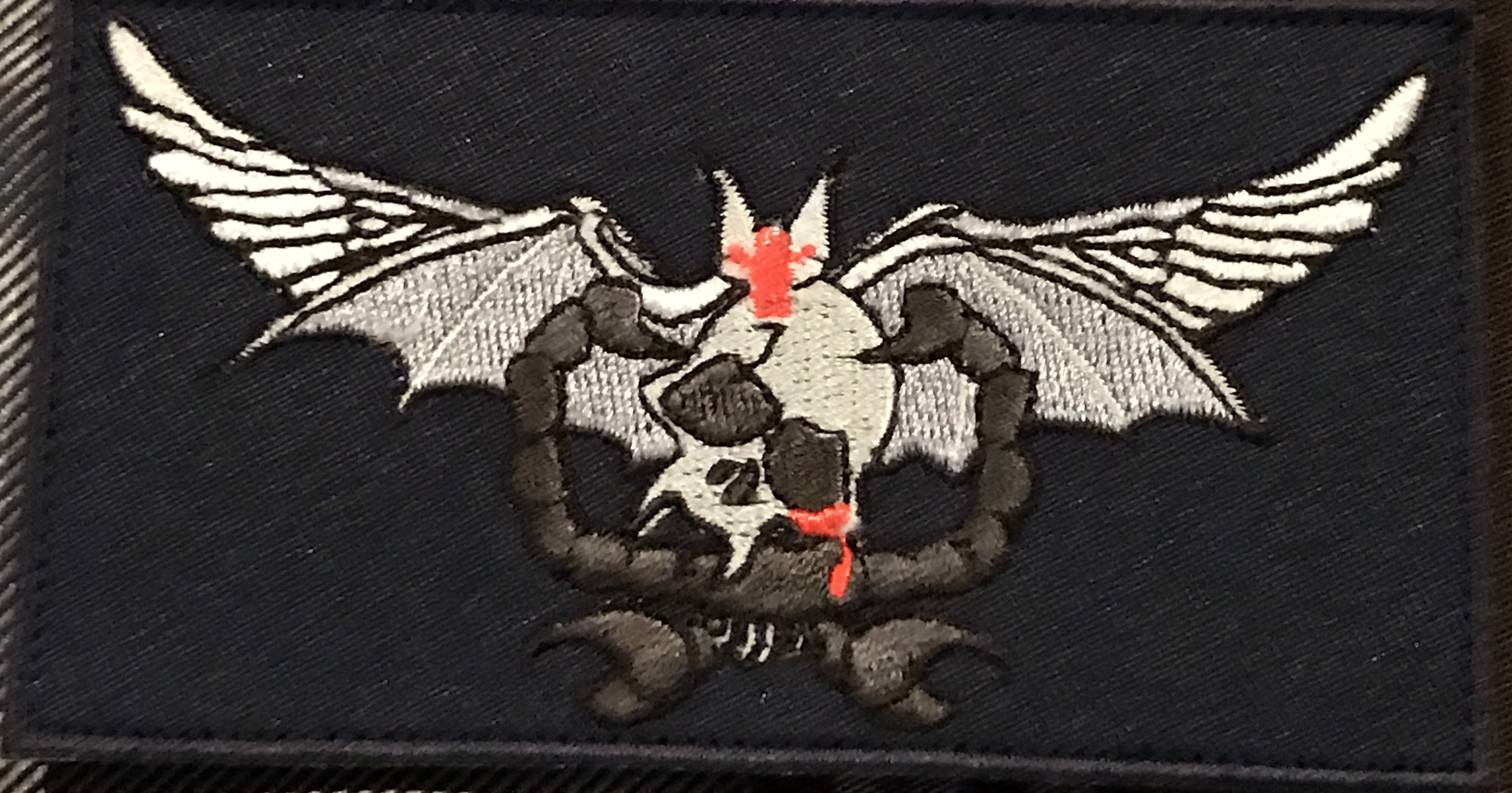
- Green SBU Patch Blue SBU Patch

The Special Boarding Unit (特別警備隊, Tokubetsukeibitai) is a special forces unit established by the Japan Maritime Self-Defense Force (JMSDF) on March 27, 2001, in response to a suspected North Korean spy ship incursion that had taken place on the Noto Peninsula in 1999.

The unit was created to perform similar roles to those undertaken by American Navy SEALs and the British SBS. Its structure is based on that of the SBS. It is based in Etajima, Hiroshima.

The unit's roles involve maritime counterterrorism and hostage rescue duties, including special operations where arms are known to be involved. However, its duties and responsibilities overlap with those of the Special Security Team, the Japan Coast Guard's counter-terrorist unit. However, the SST has the right to detain anyone lawfully.

Information on SBU personnel, training and weapons is classified and not available. Its operators wear balaclavas to protect their identities when operating where they can be seen. Due to the nature of their duties and responsibilities, an amendment had been passed to raise their salaries.

== History ==
After a failed Japanese Maritime Self-Defense Forces mission to stop North Korean spy ships that were in Japanese territorial waters off the Noto Peninsula, the SBU was established with its headquarters in Etajima, Hiroshima. The unit had conducted some covert training in Etajima after its creation, including exercises on boarding tactics to enter ships. Training was completed in 2000, a year after the SBU was created. A ship reported to have illegally entered Amami Ōshima was seen nearby, which led to the mobilization of the SBU. The ship, however, was said to have been scuttled before they could intervene. The unit made its existence known to the public in 2007 during a training exercise, which involved the deployment of Howa Type 89–armed SBU operators via RHIBs and SH-60J helicopters.

When the unit was created, it had requested training with the US Navy SEALs, but had not been able to do so due lack of available personnel who could train the candidates. To resolve this, the SBU had requested training assistance from the SBS to help in founding the unit. An SBS instructor was sent to Japan from February to March 2000.

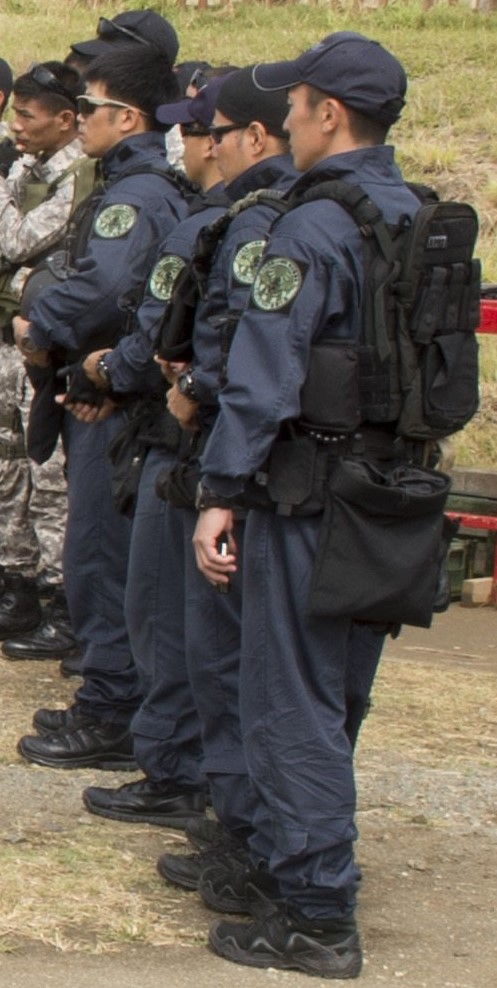
SBU operators (in caps) in the USA under Rim of the Pacific (RIMPAC) 2018 exercises.

In 2006, Iku Aso of the Shūkan Bunshun reported that the SBU was discreetly deployed to Iraq to work with American special forces in a mission to save Japanese nationals taken hostage under "Operation Babylon's Sakura", but they were never given the orders to intervene.

It was announced in January 2009 by Yasukazu Hamada that the SBU would possibly be deployed for its first mission to Somalia to engage in anti-piracy operations. The SBU was involved in anti-pirate exercises with the Samidare and the Sazanami at Bungo Channel between Shikoku and Kyushu on February 11, 2019. SBU operators had left Japan on March 14, 2009, deployed on board the Murasame-class destroyer JDS DD-106 Samidare and the Takanami-class destroyer JDS DD-113 Sazanami. The SBU would be deployed in operations with SH-60K helicopters. The deployment was made under Article 82 of the SDF Law.

Prior to the SBU's overseas deployment to Somalia, the unit had practiced alongside Japan Coast Guard units in simulating a raid on a pirate vessel played by JCG officers without any warning shots fired by SBU operators off the coast of Kure, Hiroshima with a total of 250 people participating, 60 from the JCG. In the Somali deployment, SBU forces don't have the power to detain suspected pirates, so JCG officers would be responsible for making arrests.

In 2012, restrictions for female JMSDF personnel to join the SBU were lifted.

The SBU was deployed in 2016 at the 42nd G7 summit, providing security alongside the Special Assault Team. In 2017, they were deployed under the Combined Maritime Forces mandate from the JS Teruzuki. During that time, the SBU responded to a boat that was drifting in the Gulf of Aden.

SBU operators participated with the Commandos Marine in maritime exercises in August 2019. The unit participated in the Malabar 2021 military exercises with United States Naval Special Warfare Command and MARCOS commandos.

On March 11, 2023, the SBU logo for the 1st Platoon was unveiled to the public.

=== Controversy ===
Controversy had developed from the SBU when a Japanese Maritime Self-Defense Forces cadet had died during a supposed training exercise prior to admission to the unit when it was reported in October 2008. The incident consisted of 15 levels of unarmed combat training. The JMSDF has refused to provide more details on the incident, which remains classified. However, a special committee was established to determine whether the cadet's death was murder or an accident. Investigators of the Criminal Investigation Command had assessed the incident.

Reports on the incident have identified it as a case of bullying by senior JMSDF sailors against junior sailors. The committee suggested that the deceased cadet was killed accidentally after receiving a right hook punch by his 14th opponent during the exercise, specifically to the chin.

Four JMSDF sailors were charged for their involvement in the cadet's death.

A report filed by the Ministry of Defense recommended the implementation of stringent safety standards, especially on concerns when highly strenuous activities such as physical combat training are taking place.

== Foreign relations ==
The SBU has been involved in matters involving Asia-Pacific defense, with representatives sent to the Asia Pacific Defense Forum Summer 2002 and the Asia Pacific Defense Forum 2004.

== Organization ==
As of 2014, the SBU has six platoons with one main headquarters.

90 operators are known to be in the SBU.

=== Weapons and equipment ===
It is known that the SBU uses the Heckler & Koch MP5A5 as the primary submachine guns. Their service assault rifle is the Howa Type 89, M4 carbine and HK416, while their sidearm is the SIG Sauer P226R. The SBU has been armed with the SIG-Sauer MPX with 9mm and training versions acquired.

Sniper rifles were purchased for the SBU under the 2004 defense budget under the JMSDF, but the type chosen has not been revealed to the public. It is known that they have used the Heckler & Koch MSG-90.

The SBU has use of RHIBs for maritime operations while SH-60J helicopters are used for aerial insertions during shipboarding missions.

SBU operators in Somalia were spotted wearing Ops-Core helmets.

== Training ==
SBU candidates are schooled at the Naval Academy Etajima's 1st Service School. Basic education is done at the school while the rest is done in a training program prior to recruitment.
