= Fushin-sen =

Japanese term for unknown ships

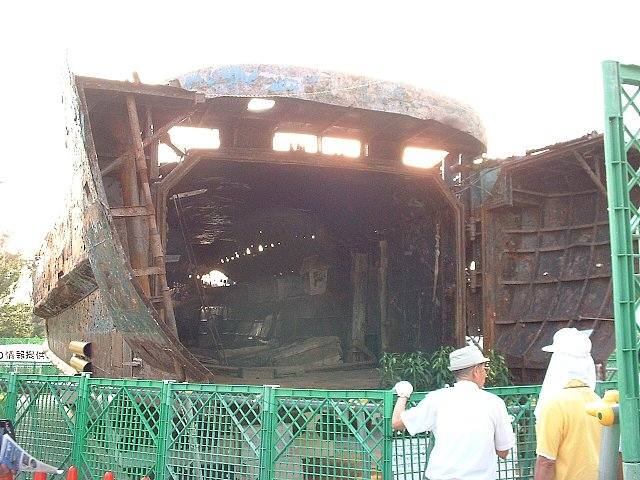
Example of a fushin-sen: A North Korean ship exhibited at the Museum of Maritime Science. View from the stern (photographed in September 2003)

Fushin-sen (不審船; lit. 'suspicious ship') is a Japanese term that generally refers to any seaborne vessel that behaves suspiciously. In Japan, this term is often used to refer to North Korean vessels found in the waters near Japan which are suspected of criminal activity, such as poaching or smuggling. These vessels have also operated in or around South Korean waters.

== North Korean fushin-sen ==
The term fushin-sen has become synonymous with North Korean vessels that serve as a connection between North Korean criminal activity and the Yakuza. There are incidents of fushin-sen being involved in the smuggling of agents, illegal immigrants, and drugs, as well as the abduction and trafficking of Japanese people. According to the former Secretary of the Public Security Intelligence Agency, criminal activity such as organized crime and front companies are suspected of using fushin-sen to supply drugs to the Yakuza, who already have connections with North Korean agents and institutions.

Fushin-sen are used by a special unit of the North Korean regime, and the operatives on board are carefully selected. These operatives may be trained in combat tactics, such as sniping and Kyeok Sul Do. They may also have advanced foreign language skills, used to impersonate citizens and establish permanent residency in their destination. Operatives smuggled into Japan by seacraft are usually concealed and blend in as members of society, while they gather intelligence or carry out orders. Such operatives may coerce others to carry out criminal activities for them. In Japan, several such operatives are wanted by Interpol.

Since 1999, the Japanese police and Coast Guard are actively working to educate civilians about the fushin-sen issue and the dangers they pose to public safety. In coastal areas, prefectural police headquarters and police stations have been conducting active seminars for companies and fishermen since the 1950s. It has not always been possible to prevent abduction and smuggling. The Japan Coast Guard recommends that citizens call 118 (the telephone number for emergency calls for incidents and accidents at sea in Japan) if a person witnesses a suspicious ship that appears to be of North Korean origin.

=== Features ===
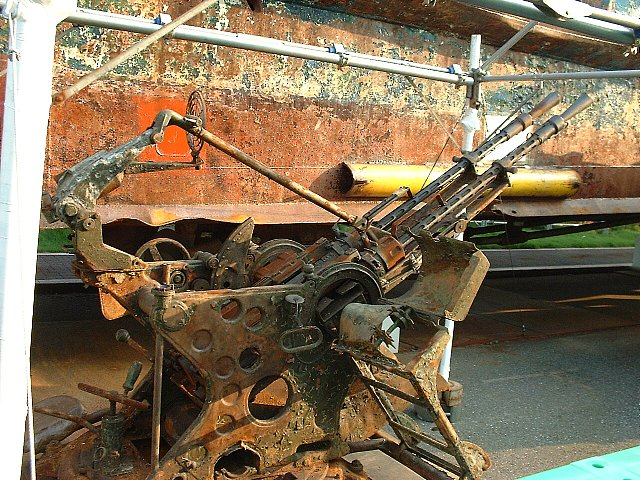
A ZPU-2 anti-aircraft gun from the fushin-sen involved in the Battle of Amami-Ōshima. Having heavy anti-aircraft and/or anti-tank weapons aboard is one of the signs of a fushin-sen type of ship.

The following list describes possible features of suspected North Korean fushin-sen:

- The ship may be (or be disguised as) a Japanese or Chinese fishing vessel; or as a North Korean cargo ship.
- The ship may be equipped with a large number of antennas, which improve the signal of wireless equipment such as shortwave radios.
- The ship's mast may be equipped with radar more powerful than those of normal fishing boats. This is used to quickly detect the approach of Japan Maritime Self-Defense Force vessels and fishery patrol boats, in order to take evasive action.
- The ship may have unused fishing gear mounted on the bow, or none at all.
- The ship may contain a small, high-speed boat for landing (often similar to small, coastal Japanese fishing boats) and a door at the ship's stern for deploying it. When infiltrating South Korea, a semi-submersible may be installed. This is because in South Korea, if a suspected spy ship attempts to escape, the ROK Navy will sink it.
- The ship's lights may be switched off in order to facilitate covert drop-offs during nighttime.
- The ship may contain hidden weapons. An investigation of the North Korean vessel used in the Spy Ship Incident in the Southwest Sea of Kyūshū revealed that it was equipped with a large number of weapons, including anti-aircraft weapons and anti-tank weapons.
- The ship may be equipped with engines atypically powerful for fishing boats. This enables high-speed navigation equal to or higher than that of warships. However, when a research team at the Japan Coast Guard Academy inspected a suspicious ship that was pulled up during the Battle of Amami-Oshima in the southwestern part of Kyushu, it seems that the speed will drop significantly in bad weather with a wave height of 3 meters (9.8 ft) or more.
- A (North Korean) contact ashore may communicate with a suspicious ship offshore at night using a light emitting signal or a mobile phone, from a vehicle such as a rental car. In particular, freight vehicles—such as cold storage trucks and aluminum vans—are preferred when accepting operatives and smuggled goods.

== Encounters ==
=== Niigata JRCS center bombing attempt ===
On December 4, 1959, the South Korean government conducted a joint return project for Koreans in Japan with the Japanese Red Cross Society. In response, the North Korean government and Koreans in Japan jointly carried out terrorist activities, such as the bombing of trains and ships in Japan and the abductions of important people.

=== Kidnapping of Kim Dae-jung ===
Kim Dae-jung, a South Korean politician, was living in exile in Japan due to his opposition to the power regime in South Korea at that time. On August 8, 1973, as he left a meeting in Tokyo, he was kidnapped by agents working for the Korean Central Intelligence Agency. He was taken to Osaka and put aboard a boat which sailed towards South Korea. The vessel was tracked by an airplane of the Japanese Maritime Defense Force which fired an illuminating shell as the kidnappers brought Kim (with weights attached to him) on deck, apparently intending to drown him. The vessel continued to South Korea and Kim was put under house arrest. In 1998, Kim became the president of South Korea.

=== Suspicious ship off the Noto Peninsula ===
On March 23, 1999, a ship believed to be a North Korean craft ship appeared off the Noto Peninsula in the Sea of Japan. It was tracked by the Japan Coast Guard and the Maritime Self-Defense Force. For the first time, the Maritime Self-Defense Force was issued a maritime security action, a de facto battle order. The craft ship was missed, but this incident triggered the realization of hull shooting and the maintenance of patrol boats due to the revision of the Japan Coast Guard Law, as well as the formation of the Maritime Self-Defense Force's Special Boarding Unit and on-site inspection team with escort vessels.

=== Kyushu Southwest Sea Area Fushin-sen Incident (Battle of Amami-Ōshima) ===
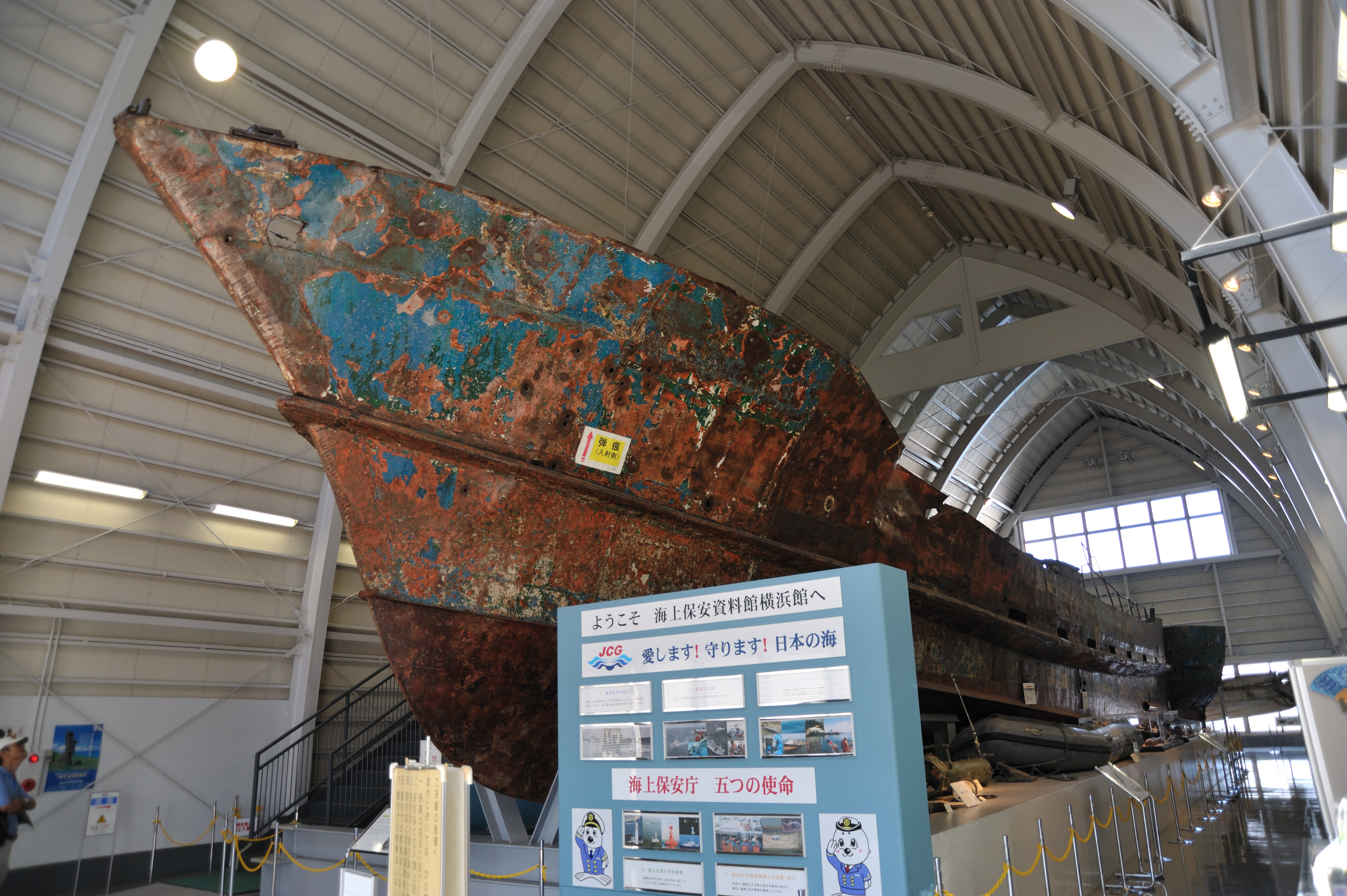
The ship used by North Koreans during the Battle of Amami-Ōshima on display at the Yokohama marine disaster prevention base.

On December 22, 2001, an unidentified vessel was detected in the East China Sea off the southwest coast of Kyushu. Four Coast Guard ships approached the vessel and ordered it to halt. When it did not, the Coast Guard fired warning shots, and the unidentified vessel returned fire. A six-hour gun battle ensued, ending when the unidentified vessel apparently scuttled itself, and the Coast Guard was ordered to leave the fifteen survivors to drown. In 2003, Japan raised the hull in order to identify the vessel and determined that it was a North Korean spy ship.

=== Other incidents ===
- Suspicious ship off the coast of Kaga City (July 31, 1971).
- Hyuga Nada Suspicious Ship Case (April 25–27, 1985).
- Mihama Incident (October 28, 1990): An incident in which a small boat for landing was washed ashore on the coast of Mihama-cho, Mikata-gun, Fukui Prefecture. (Note: For more information, see Mihama case seen in the picture (Fukui Prefectural Police))
- North Korean semi-submersible sinking incident (December 18, 1998): A suspicious ship found by South Korean coastal guards invading South Korean waters fled into Japanese waters. When the South Korean Navy pursued the ship, an incident occurred in which it was sunk on the open sea 70 km (43 mi) off Tsushima, Nagasaki Prefecture. A later pull-up investigation revealed that the suspicious ship was a North Korean semi-submersible. Until March 1999, the Japan Coast Guard strengthened vigilance off the coast of Tsushima and provided crime prevention guidance to residents of Tsushima and the Goto Islands.
- Suspicious Ship Case in Central Sea of Japan (September 4–5, 2002).
- Man Gyong Bong 92, a cargo-passenger ferry between Japan and North Korea which ran from 1992 until 2006, was claimed to be used for smuggling.

== See also ==
- Illicit activities of North Korea
- Pong Su incident
- 1996 Gangneung submarine infiltration incident
