= Hwang Jong-woo =

South Korean politician (born 1967)

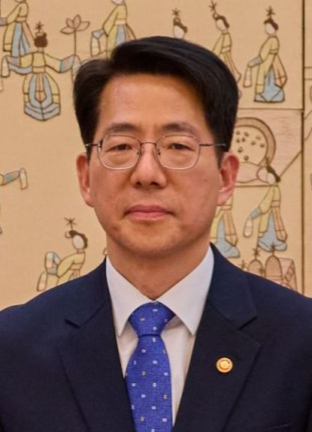
- Hwang in 2026

Minister of Oceans and Fisheries
- Incumbent
- Assumed office 25 March 2026
- President: Lee Jae Myung
- Prime Minister: Kim Min-seok; Han Seong-sook
- Preceded by: Chun Jae-soo; Kim Sung-bum (acting)

Personal details
- Born: 1967 (age 58–59) Busan, South Korea
- Education: Seoul National University

Hwang Jong-woo (Korean: 황종우; born 1967) is a South Korean politician who has served as the minister of oceans and fisheries since 2026.

== Biography ==
Hwang was born in Busan in 1967. He graduated with a bachelor's degree in law and a master's degree in public administration from Seoul National University. Hwang served in the Roh Moo-hyun and Moon Jae-in administrations. Hwang also held several director positions at the Ministry of Land, Transport, and Maritime affairs and Ministry of Oceans and Fisheries.

On March 2, 2026, Hwang was nominated Ocean Minister. Before becoming the Minster of Oceans and Fisheries, Hwang served as chair of the Korea Maritime Cooperation Center's international cooperation committee. According to Hwang, the Ministry is attempting to turn South Korea's southeastern region into a maritime center to prepare for the expansion of Arctic shipping routes. Hwang opposed Iranian fees in the Strait of Hormuz because he saw it as a violation of international law.
