= Ji Guoxing =

Chinese academic

Ji Guoxing (季国兴) is a Chinese academic, author, political scientist and professor at Shanghai Jiaotong University.

== Career ==
In 2009, he was Director of Maritime Security Studies Program of the Shanghai Center for RimPac Strategic and International Studies (CPSIS) at the Shanghai Institute for International Studies.

From November 1994 through October 1995, Professor Ji was a visiting fellow at the Institute on Global Conflict and Cooperation in Berkeley, California.

== Selected works ==
In a statistical overview derived from writings by and about Ji Guoxing, OCLC/WorldCat encompasses roughly 4 works in 6 publications in the English language and 30+ library holdings.

- The Spratlys Disputes and Prospects for Settlement (1992)
- 东南亚概览: 当今世界经济高速发展的热点地區 Dong nan Ya gai lan : dang jin shi jie jing ji gao su fa zhan de re dian di qu (1994)
- Energy Security Cooperation in the Asia Pacific (1996)
- China Versus South China Sea Security (1998)
- Asian Pacific SLOC Security: the China Factor (2001)
- 中国的海洋安全和海域管辖 Zhongguo de hai yang an quan he hai yu guan xia (2009)
