= Cho Seung-hwan =

South Korean politician

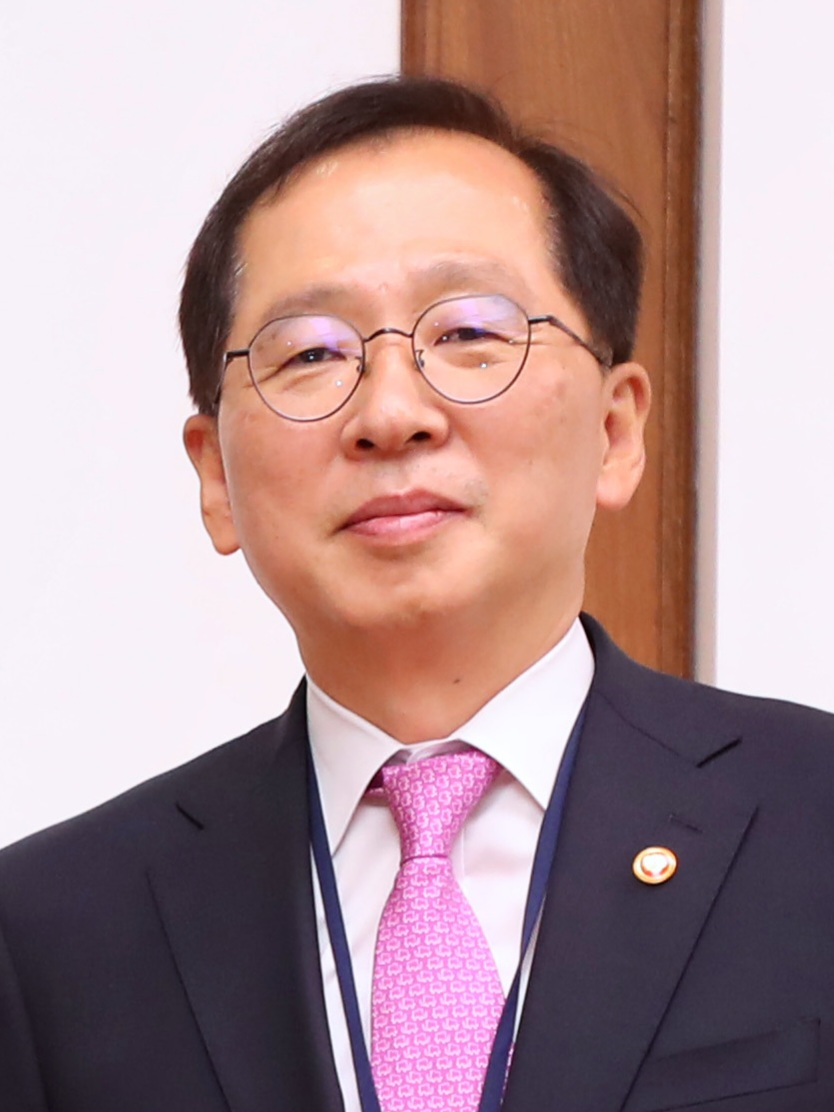
- Cho in 2022

Minister of Oceans and Fisheries
- In office May 10, 2022 – December 28, 2023

Personal details
- Born: 1966 (age 59–60) Busan, South Korea
- Education: Korea University; University of Washington

Cho Seung-hwan (Korean: 조승환; born 1966) is a South Korean politician. Cho was the Minister of Oceans and Fisheries.

== Biography ==
Cho was born in 1966 in Busan, South Korea. He graduated from the Korea University in Seoul with bachelor´s and master´s degrees in law in 1990, and passed the civil service exam in the same year. Cho gained a Master of Laws degree from the University of Washington.

In 1992, Cho worked in the Ministry of Unification´s Unification Policy Office. In 2003, Cho became the Director of the Coastal Planning Division in the Ministry of Oceans and Fisheries. In 2006, Cho became the Director of the Port Logistics Division in the Busan Regional Maritime Affairs and Fisheries Office. In 2011, Cho became the Director of the Incheon Regional Maritime Affairs and Port Office.

In 2016, he was head of the Busan Regional Office of Oceans and Fisheries. From 2018 to 2021, Cho was head of the Korea Institute of Marine Science and Technology Promotion. Cho was president of the Ministry of Ocean and Fisheries´s Research and Development branch.

According to the Korean Herald, when Cho was nominated to become Minister of Oceans and Fisheries, he was most famous for successfully dealing with the fallout that happened because of the bankruptcy of Hanjin Shipping in 2017. On May 10, 2022, Cho became the Minister of Oceans and Fisheries.

In August 2022, Cho stated in an interview with Maeil Business Newspaper that Hyundai Merchant Marine should be privatized. On June 27, 2023, Cho spoke at a meeting of the National Assembly´s agriculture and fisheries committee alongside head of the rural development agency Cho Chae-ho. Cho told the Korea Times that one of Ministry of Ocean and Fisheries´s biggest achievements was preventing a decrease in seafood consumption after Japan started to release treated radioactive wastewater from the Fukushima Daiichi Nuclear Power Plant into the ocean in August 2023. During Cho´s term, South Korea joined the International Maritime Organization’s top council for the 12th time in a row.
