= ZPU =

Type of Soviet anti-aircraft gun

ZPU anti-aircraft gun
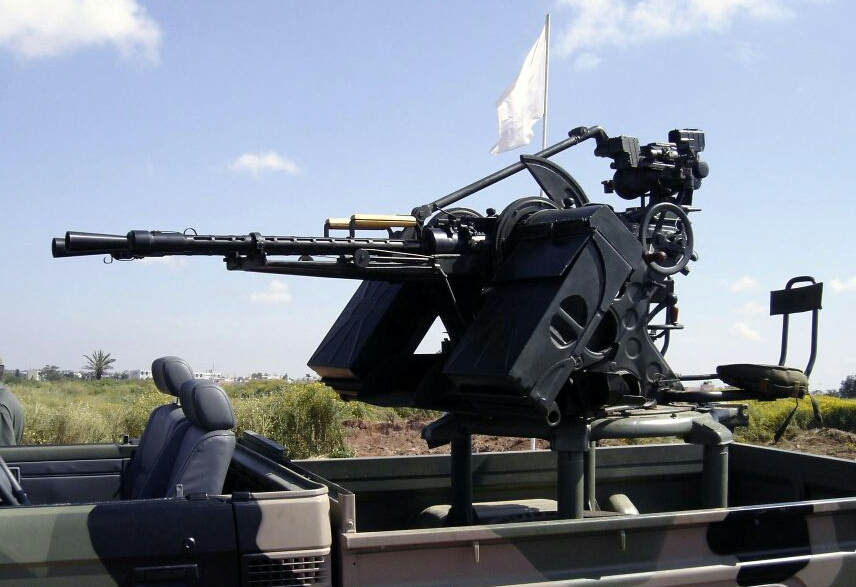
- ZPU-2
- Type: Anti-aircraft gun Heavy machine gun
- Place of origin: Soviet Union

Service history
- In service: 1949–present
- Used by: See Operators for users
- Wars: See Wars for wars

Production history
- Manufacturer: Degtyaryov Plant
- Variants: ZPU-1, ZPU-2, ZPU-4

Specifications
- Shell: 14.5x114mm
- Caliber: 14.5 mm
- Barrels: 1-4
- Action: Short recoil operation
- Effective firing range: 1.4 km (0.87 mi)
- Maximum firing range: 4 km (2.5 mi)
- Feed system: 150 round belt each

The ZPU (Russian: ЗПУ; зенитная пулемётная установка, romanized: zenitnaya pulemotnaya ustanovka, lit. 'anti-aircraft machine gun mount') is a family of towed anti-aircraft guns based on the Soviet 14.5×114mm KPV heavy machine gun. It entered service with the Soviet Union in 1949 and is used by over 50 countries worldwide.

Quadruple-barreled (ZPU-4), double-barreled (ZPU-2 and ZU-2), and single-barreled (ZPU-1) versions of the weapon exist.

== Precursor ==
The first dedicated Soviet mount for anti-aircraft machine guns was developed around 1928 by Fedor Tokarev and was adopted for service in 1931. It was a base for mounting up to four 7.62 mm PM M1910 (Russian Maxim) guns. This was also called a ZPU, although the name М-4 was also assigned to it. It served the Soviet armed forces in all major conflicts until 1945. 12.7 mm DShK 1938 was used an anti-aircraft weapon it was mounted on pintle and tripod mounts, and on a triple mount on the GAZ-AA truck. Late in the war, it was mounted on the cupolas of IS-2 tanks and ISU-152 self-propelled guns. As an infantry heavy support weapon it used a two-wheeled trolley which unfolded into a tripod for anti-aircraft use.

== Description ==
Development of the ZPU-2 and ZPU-4 began in 1945, with development of the ZPU-1 starting in 1947. All three were accepted into service in 1949. Improved optical predicting gunsights were developed for the system in the 1950s.

All weapons in the ZPU series have air-cooled quick-change barrels and can fire a variety of ammunition including API (B32), API (BS41), API-T (BZT) and I-T (ZP) projectiles. Each barrel has a maximum rate of fire of around 600 rounds per minute, though this is practically limited to about 150 rounds per minute.

The quad-barrel ZPU-4 uses a four-wheel carriage similar to that once used by the obsolete 25 mm automatic anti-aircraft gun M1940. In firing position, the weapon is lowered onto firing jacks. It can be brought in and out of action in about 15 to 20 seconds, and can be fired with the wheels in the traveling position if needed.

The double-barrel ZPU-2 was built in two different versions; the early model has large mud guards and two wheels that are removed in the firing position, and the late model has wheels that fold and are raised from the ground in the firing position.

ZPU-2 turned out to be too heavy for the airborne troops, so a new UZPU-2 (later redesignated as ZU-2) was developed from ZPU-1.

The single-barrel ZPU-1 is carried on a two-wheeled carriage and can be broken down into several 80-kilogram pieces for transport over rough ground.

Versions of the weapon are built in China, North Korea and Romania.

== History ==
The series was used during the Korean War by Chinese and North Korean forces, and was later considered to be the most dangerous opposition to U.S. helicopters in Vietnam. Later it was used by Morocco and the Polisario Front in the Western Sahara War. It was also used by Iraqi forces during Operation Desert Storm and again in Operation Iraqi Freedom. In 1974 the Cyprus National Guard artillery batteries used their ZPU-2s against the Turkish air force. In the Russian military, it was replaced by the newer and more powerful ZU-23 23 mm twin automatic anti-aircraft gun.

During the Lebanese Civil War, the Lebanese militias mounted the ZPU-2 and ZPU-4 on various vehicles, such as M113 armored personnel carriers, to create self-propelled support vehicles.

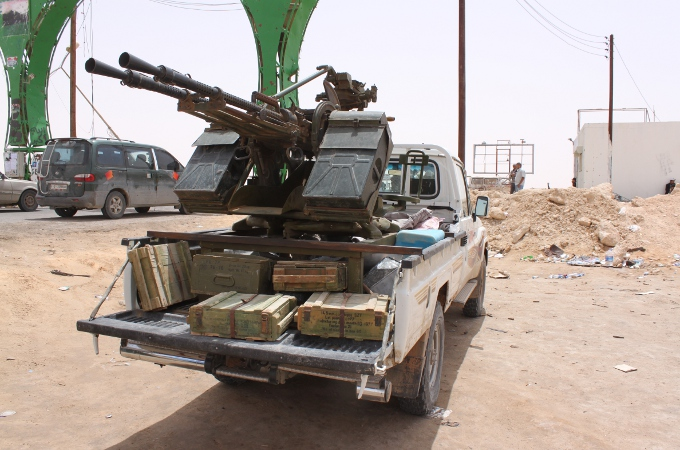
A Libyan technical with ZU-2.

The ZPU has seen widespread use by both sides in the Libyan Civil War, Syrian Civil War, and Yemeni Civil War, being often mounted on technical pickup trucks. The weapon is credited for bringing down several Syrian Air Force helicopters.

In North Korea, ZPU systems have been modified to be able to be directed by a MR-104 "Drum Tilt", where the guns are shown to be fired without personnel manning them. Several ZPU-4 weapons are suspected to have been used in public executions in the country in October 2014.

During the Donbas War, ZPUs were observed in use with Ukrainian and pro-Russian separatists forces.

Czech company Excalibur Army developed the MR-2 Viktor mobile gun air defense system consisting of a ZPU-2 equipped with day/night sights mounted on a pickup truck chassis upgraded with a reinforced suspension and modified body. The Viktor was supplied to Ukraine in late 2022 during the Russian invasion of Ukraine to combat low-altitude aerial targets, particularly unmanned aerial vehicles.

== Ammunition ==
- API (BS.41): Full metal jacket bullet round with a tungsten carbide core. Projectile weight is 64.4 g (2.27 oz) and muzzle velocity is 1000 metres per second (3,281 ft/s). Armor-penetration at 500 m (550 yd) is 32 mm (1.3 in) of RHA at 90 degrees.
- API-T (BZT): Full metal jacket round with a steel core. Projectile weight is 59.56 g (2.101 oz) and muzzle velocity is 1,005 m/s (3,297 ft/s). Tracer burns to at least 2,000 m (2,200 yd).
- I-T (ZP): "Instantaneous Incendiary" bullet with internal fuze, incendiary in tip, tracer container in base. Projectile weight is 60.0 g (2.12 oz).

Rounds are also produced by Bulgaria, China, Egypt, Poland, and Romania.

== Variants ==
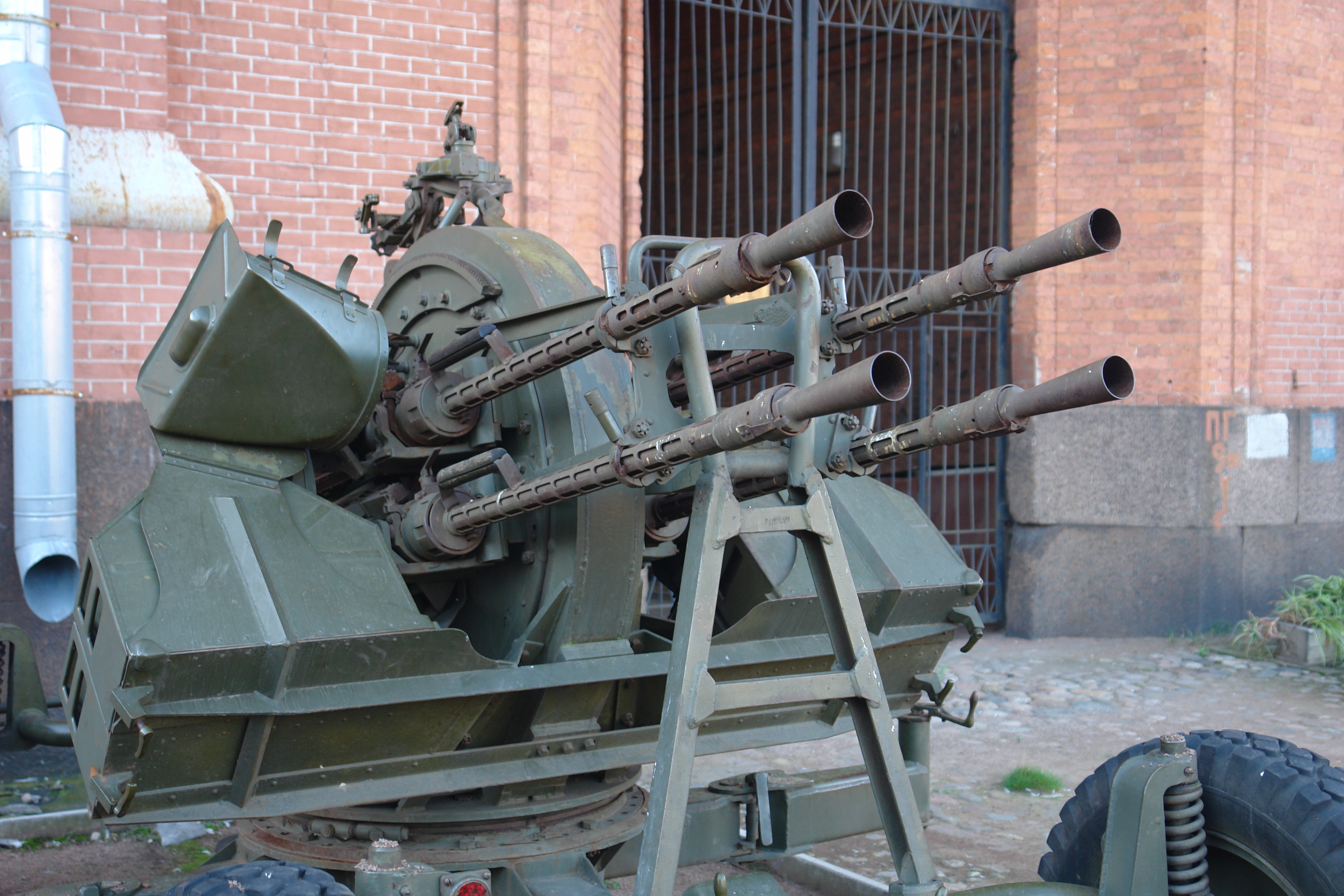
Original ZPU-4.

- ZPU-4
  - Type 56: Chinese-built version.
  - MR-4: Romanian-built version with a two-wheel carriage designed locally.
  - PKM-4: Polish designation for an imported Soviet ZPU-4
- ZPU-2
  - Type 58: Chinese-built version.
  - PKM-2: Polish-built version.
- ZU-2
- ZPU-1
  - Type 75 and Type 75-1: Chinese built-versions.
- BTR-40A SPAAG: A BTR-40 APC with a ZPU-2 gun mounted in the rear. Entered service in 1950.
- BTR-152A SPAAG: A BTR-152 with a ZPU-2 mounted in the rear. Entered service in 1952.

== Specifications ==
Model	ZPU-1	ZPU-2	ZU-2	ZPU-4
Barrels	1	2	2	4
Weight (travelling)	413 kg (910 lb)	994 kg (2,191 lb)	649 kg (1,430 lb)	1,810 kg (3,990 lb)
Weight (firing)	413 kg (910 lb)	639 kg (1,408 lb)	621 kg (1,369 lb)	1,810 kg (3,990 lb)
Length (travel)	3.44 m (11 ft 3 in)	3.54 m (11 ft 7 in)	3.87 m (12 ft 8 in)	4.53 m (14 ft 10 in)
Width (travel)	1.62 m (5 ft 4 in)	1.92 m (6 ft 4 in)	1.37 m (4 ft 6 in)	1.72 m (5 ft 8 in)
Height (travel)	1.34 m (4 ft 5 in)	1.83 m (6 ft 0 in))	1.1 m (3 ft 7 in)	2.13 m (7 ft 0 in)
Elevation	+88 °/−8 °	+90 °/−7 °	+85 °/−15 °	+90 °/−10 °
Traverse	360 °			
Maximum range	8,000 m (8,750 yds)			
Maximum altitude	5,000 m (16,400 ft)			
Effective altitude	1,400 m (4,590 ft)			
Ammunition (rounds)	1,200	2,400		4,800
Crew	4	5		

== Operators ==
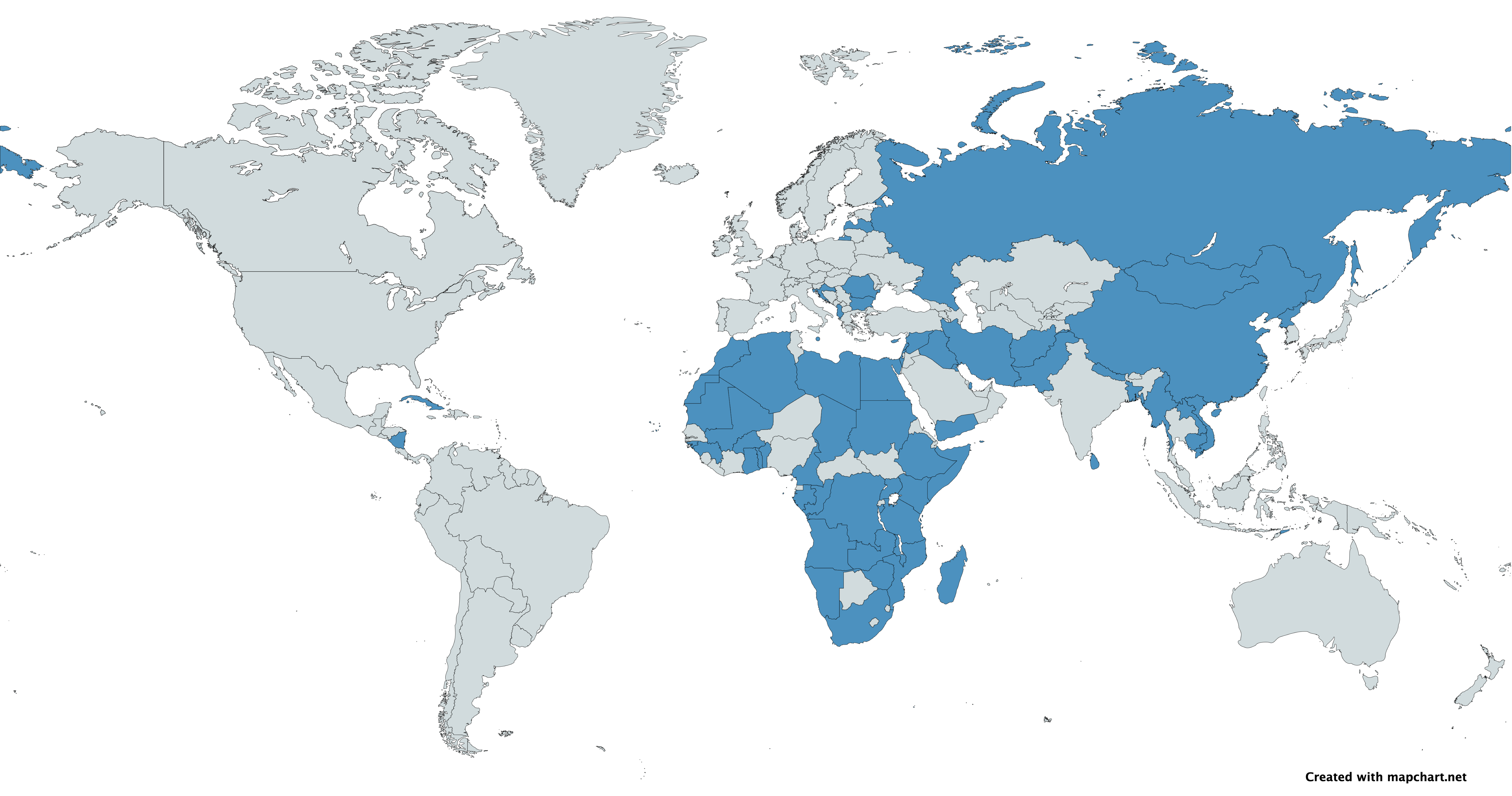
A map of nations that use the ZPU

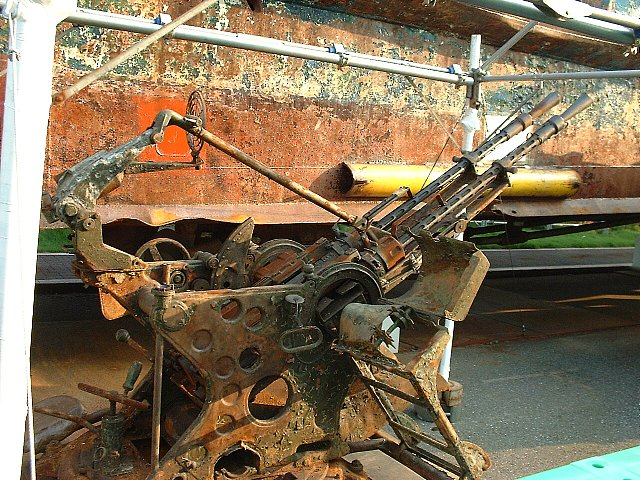
A North Korean ZPU-2, recovered from the naval trawler sunk by the Japan Coast Guard during the Battle of Amami-Ōshima

- Afghanistan
- Albania - 336
- Algeria – 100 (40 ZPU-4 and 60 ZPU-2)
- Angola
- Bangladesh Type-56
- Benin
- Bulgaria
- Burkina Faso
- Burundi – 15
- Cambodia
- Cameroon - 18
- Cape Verde - 18
- Chad
- China
- Congo-Brazzaville
- Congo-Kinshasa - 12
- Croatia
- Cuba
- Cyprus: ZPU-2s used against Turkish aircraft during Turkish invasion of Cyprus.
- Djibouti
- East Timor
- Egypt
- Ethiopia
- Gabon
- Ghana - 4+
- Guinea
- Guinea-Bissau
- Hungary
- Iran
- Iraq
- Islamic State
- Israel
- Kenya
- Laos
- Latvia – 2
- Lebanon
- Libya
- Madagascar – 50
- Malawi – 40
- Mali
- Malta – 50
- Mauritania – 12
- Mongolia
- Morocco – 19
- Mozambique
- Myanmar
- Namibia
- Nepal – 36
- Nicaragua
- North Korea
- Pakistan
- Panama
- People's Defense Units (YPG): ZPU-4
- Poland
- Qatar – ZPU-2
- Romania
- Russia
- Sahrawi Republic – ZPU-2 and ZPU-4
- São Tomé and Príncipe
- Seychelles
- Somalia
- South Africa
- Soviet Union
- Sri Lanka
- Sudan
- Syria
- Tanzania – 21
- Togo – 38
- Transnistria
- Uganda
- Ukraine
- Vietnam
- Yemen – ZPU-1, ZPU-2 and ZPU-4
- Zambia
- Zimbabwe – 36

=== Former operators ===
- Czechoslovakia
- East Germany − Used by the Combat Groups of the Working Class.
- Yugoslavia: Passed on to successor states.

== Wars ==
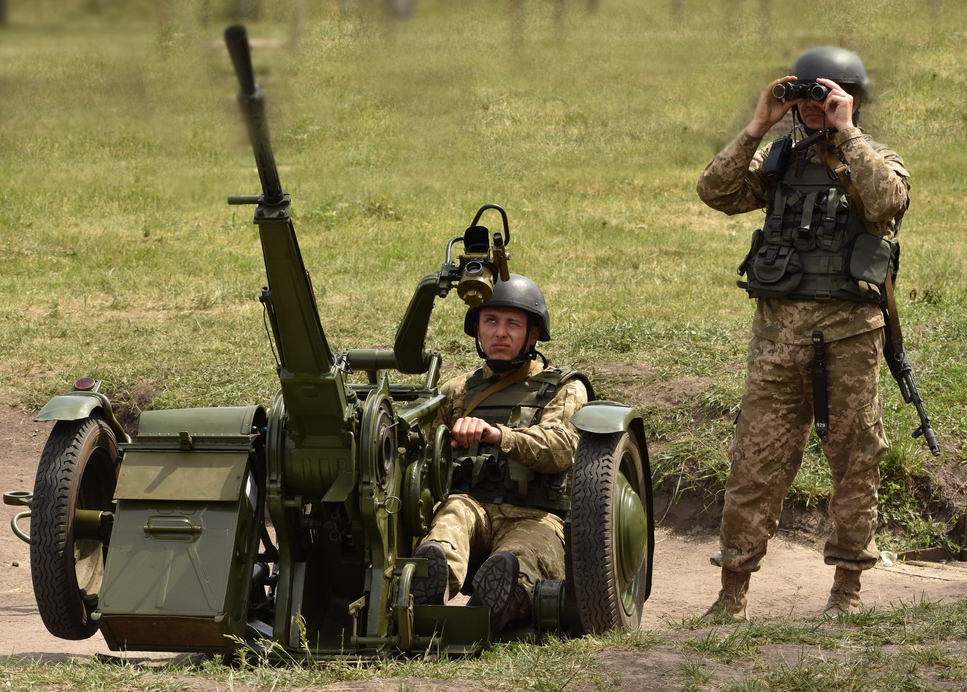
A Ukrainian ZPU-1

The ZPU served in several conflicts:

- Korean War
- Invasion of Panama
- Vietnam War
- Yom Kippur War
- Rhodesian Bush War
- Western Sahara War
- Angolan Civil War
- Cambodian Civil War
- Lebanese Civil War
- Soviet–Afghan War
- South African Border War
- Somali Civil War
- Gulf War
- Georgian Civil War
- South Lebanon conflict (1985–2000)
- Bosnian War
- First Chechen War
- Second Congo War
- Second Chechen War
- War in Afghanistan (2001–2021)
- Iraq War (2003-2011)
- 2006 Lebanon War
- Russo-Georgian War
- First Libyan Civil War
- Sudanese conflict in South Kordofan and Blue Nile
- Syrian Civil War
- Russo-Ukrainian War
  - War in Donbas
  - Russian invasion of Ukraine
- Second Libyan Civil War
- Yemeni Civil War (2014–present)
- Saudi Arabian-led intervention in Yemen

== Gallery ==
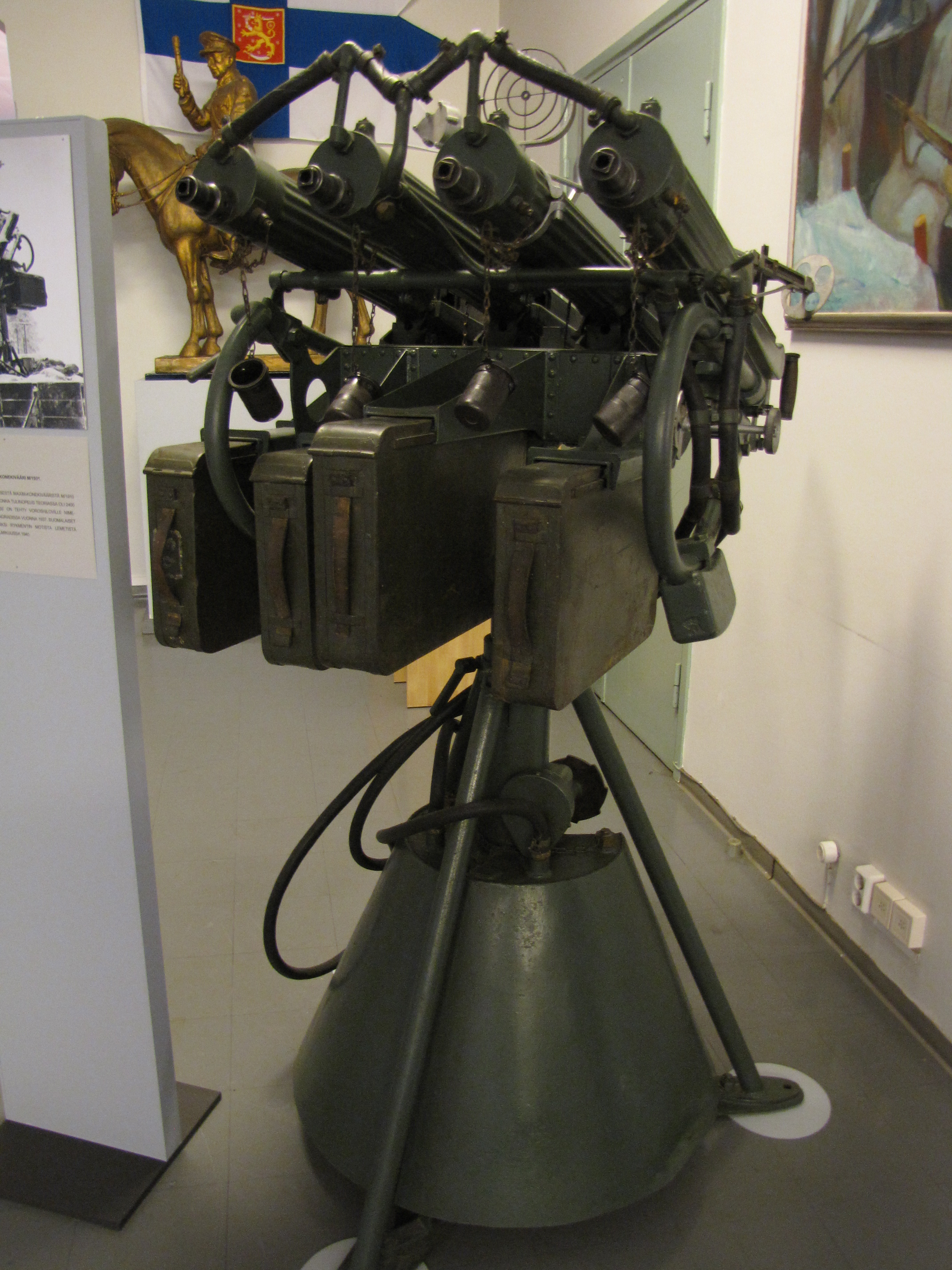
The 1931 ZPU for 7.62 mm machine guns

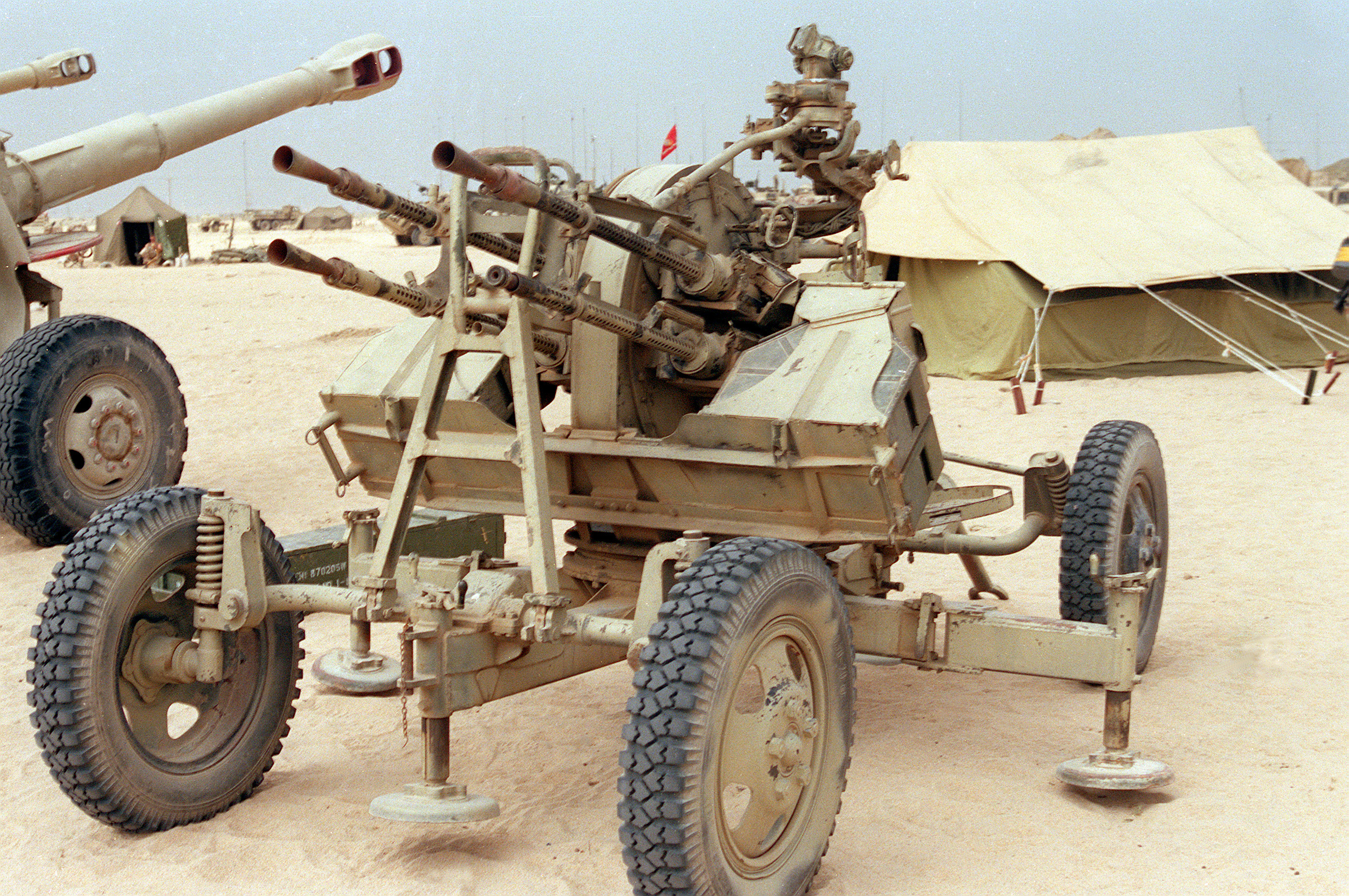
Iraqi ZPU-4 captured during Operation Desert Storm

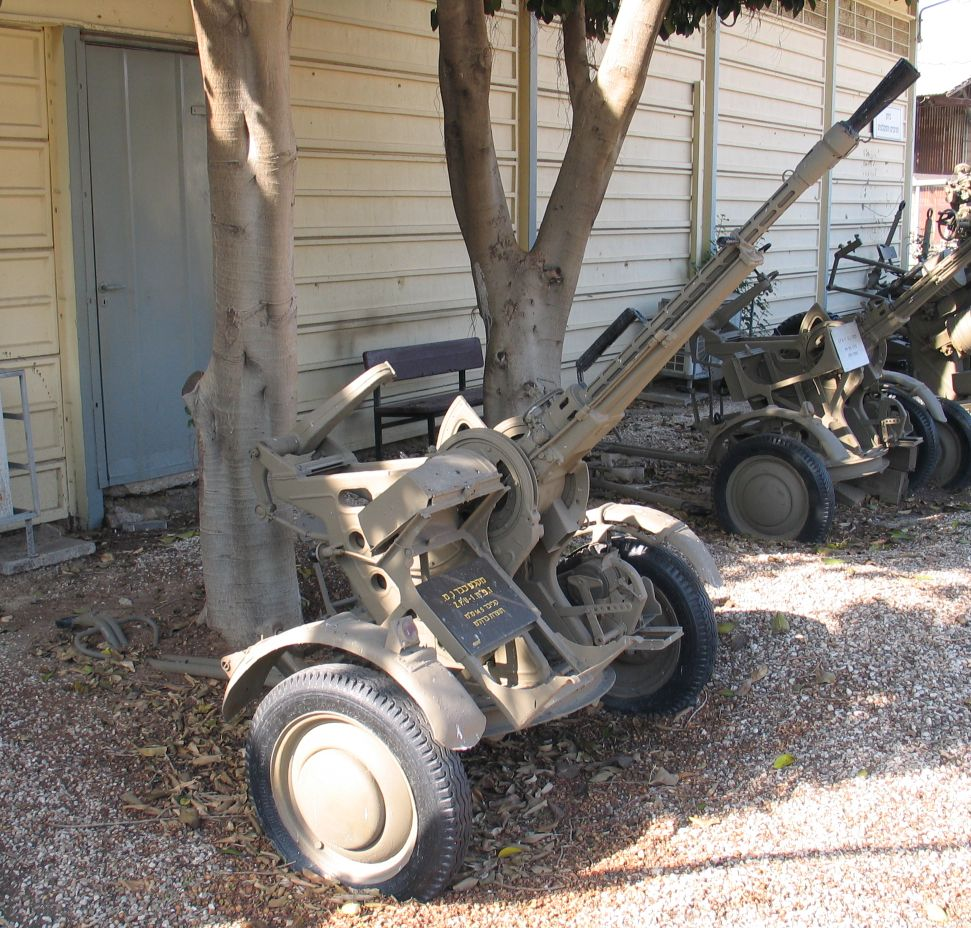
ZPU-1 gun in Batey ha-Osef Museum, Tel Aviv, Israel

== See also ==
- Zastava M55
- ZU-23-2
