= Exclusive economic zone of North Korea =

North Korean maritime boundary

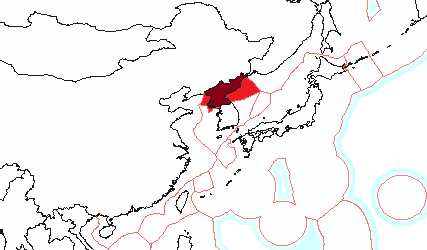
The exclusive economic zone (EEZ) of North Korea

The exclusive economic zone of North Korea stretches 200 nautical miles from its basepoints in both the Yellow Sea and the Sea of Japan. The exclusive economic zone (EEZ) was declared in 1977 after North Korea had contested the validity of the Northern Limit Lines (NLL) set up after the Korean War as maritime borders. The EEZ has not been codified in law and North Korea has never specified its coordinates, making it difficult to determine its specific scope.

In the Yellow Sea, the EEZ remains unspecified in the Korean Bay because China has not determined its own EEZ in the area. The border between the North Korean and South Korean EEZs in the Yellow Sea cannot be determined because of potential overlap and disputes over certain islands.

In the Sea of Japan, the North Korean EEZ can be approximated to be trapezoidal-shaped. The border between North Korea and Russia's respective EEZs is the only such border that has been determined in Northeast Asia. Here, the EEZ does not cause many problems, even with regard to South Korea, because the sea is not thought to be rich in natural resources.

== History ==
The Northern Limit Line (NLL) in the Yellow Sea

The Korean Armistice Agreement specified a Military Demarcation Line as a land border between North and South Korea, but failed to determine a maritime border. The United Nations Command of the Military Armistice Commission (UNCMAC), however, unilaterally set two maritime borders, one at the Yellow Sea and one at the Sea of Japan, known as Northern Limit Lines (NLL). Ever since the legal status of the NLLs has been contested and clashes have taken place. In 1973, North Korea explicitly challenged the validity of the Yellow Sea NLL. UNCMAC had accused North Korea of intruding to the south of the NLL, to which North Korea responded by claiming that its maritime boundary lies south of the NLL.

On 18 January 1952, South Korean President Syngman Rhee declared a "Peace Line" establishing a wide area of maritime sovereignty around the entire Korean Peninsula, including North Korea, on the basis that this was the legal government for all of Korea. It claimed an area averaging 60 nautical miles from the Korean coast. This claim, generally called the Syngman Rhee Line, was not internationally accepted.

On 21 June 1977, North Korea declared an economic zone of 200 nautical miles. The zone became effective on 1 August. That day, North Korea also declared 50-nautical mile Military Boundary Zones in both the Yellow Sea and the Sea of Japan. The North Korean exclusive economic zone (EEZ) had been born.

South Korea objected to North Korea's EEZ plans, and has given a statement: "The [South] Korean government makes it clear that it is not recognizing North Korea's Military Boundary Zones and 200-nautical mile EEZs because they may bring about change in the status quo of the Korean Peninsula since armistice in 1953". Japan protested the move as well, but China did not.

== Extent ==
North Korea has not passed a law on its EEZ. For this reason, it is not possible to define its outer limits. The country has, however, stated that the EEZ between neighboring countries or countries that are opposite one another "should be determined by consultation in accordance with the principle of an equidistant line or a median line". North Korea has never specified the geographical coordinates of its EEZ claims.

=== Yellow Sea ===
The border between the North Korean and Chinese EEZs is not clear. It can be inferred from North Korean statements that the limit of its EEZ in the Yellow Sea coincides with the limit of its Military Boundary Zone. Because the Yellow Sea is fairly narrow, the combined 400-nautical mile EEZs of North Korea and China will overlap.

The China–North Korea border on land has not been formally defined, but from treaties and statements it can be inferred to be the Yalu (Amnok) river. North Korea disputes with China a number of small islands at the mouth of the Yalu. The ownership of these islands affects the possible course that the maritime border between the two countries, and thus the border of their respective EEZs, will take. North Korea has specified its EEZ using the equidistant line method, while China, in general, prefers the natural prolongation of land territory method. In the Korean Bay in the Yellow Sea, however, China also prefers the equidistant line method, because that would give it the maximum share of the waters. Chinese academician Ji Guoxing has argued that the EEZs should take into account the specific conditions of the Korean Bay, such as China's longer coastline and historical fishing activities, and be based on the principles of equity and proportionality. On the other hand, because China has not determined its EEZ in the Yellow Sea, North Korea has probably adopted a similarly vague position so as to be flexible toward China. Some kind of agreement about the maritime border reportedly exists between North Korea and China, but it is unclear if this pertains to the EEZ or the continental shelf boundary. Which of the islands in the Yellow Sea belong to North and which to South Korea will also affect the boundaries of the EEZs of the three countries there.

Even if the issue with the islands were to be resolved, the North and South Korean EEZs would overlap, necessitating either one party to reduce its claim or the two to share some of the EEZ. According to the United Nations Convention on the Law of the Sea, the EEZs in both the Yellow Sea and the Sea of Japan should be divided so as to leave no international waters between them, because the sea areas are less than 400 nautical miles in breadth. The Yellow Sea NLL would probably not legal as a permanent boundary of territorial waters because it violates the non-encroachment principle of the convention by cutting of North Korea from the open seas. This also has implications for the EEZ. North Korea has signed the convention but not ratified it.

=== Sea of Japan ===
The EEZ in the Sea of Japan is trapezoidal-shaped. The area is not a source of great confrontation between North and South Korea because South Korean vessels avoid it. It is also not thought to be rich in natural resources.

The border between North Korea's EEZ with that of Russia is the only determined border of its EEZs, and indeed the only fully determined border of EEZs in all of Northeast Asia. It was determined in 1986. The problem with it is however that its terminus is not equidistant with South Korean or Japanese territory.

North Korea is geographically disadvantaged when it comes to the determination of EEZs, especially in the Sea of Japan where it is sandwiched between Russia and South Korea. This fact might contribute to North Korea's reluctance to commit fully to the EEZ regime and negotiate EEZ boundaries with its neighbors.

== Economy ==
North Korea conducts fishing in its EEZ, mainly for the industrial sector. Some fishing for the artisanal sector takes place, too. Subsistence fishing has declined considerably over the years.

A 2000 agreement between non-governmental fishing organizations of North and South Korea allowed South Koreans to fish inside the North Korean EEZ in the Sea of Japan until 2005. About 400 South Korean fishing vessels conducted fishing in the area.

Although China did not initially protest the establishment of the North Korean EEZ, it has subsequently accused it of hampering economic development on the mouth of the Yalu River, especially at Bohai Bay.

North Korea sells fishing quotas to its EEZ to foreigners through agents in China. North Korean fishermen who are deprived of quotas to the EEZ then resort to poaching in the waters of China and Russia.

== See also ==
- Economy of North Korea
- Exclusive economic zone of Japan
- Geography of North Korea
- List of border incidents involving North and South Korea
- North Korea–Russia border
