= Ministry of Oceans and Fisheries =

Government ministry of South Korea

- 해양수산부

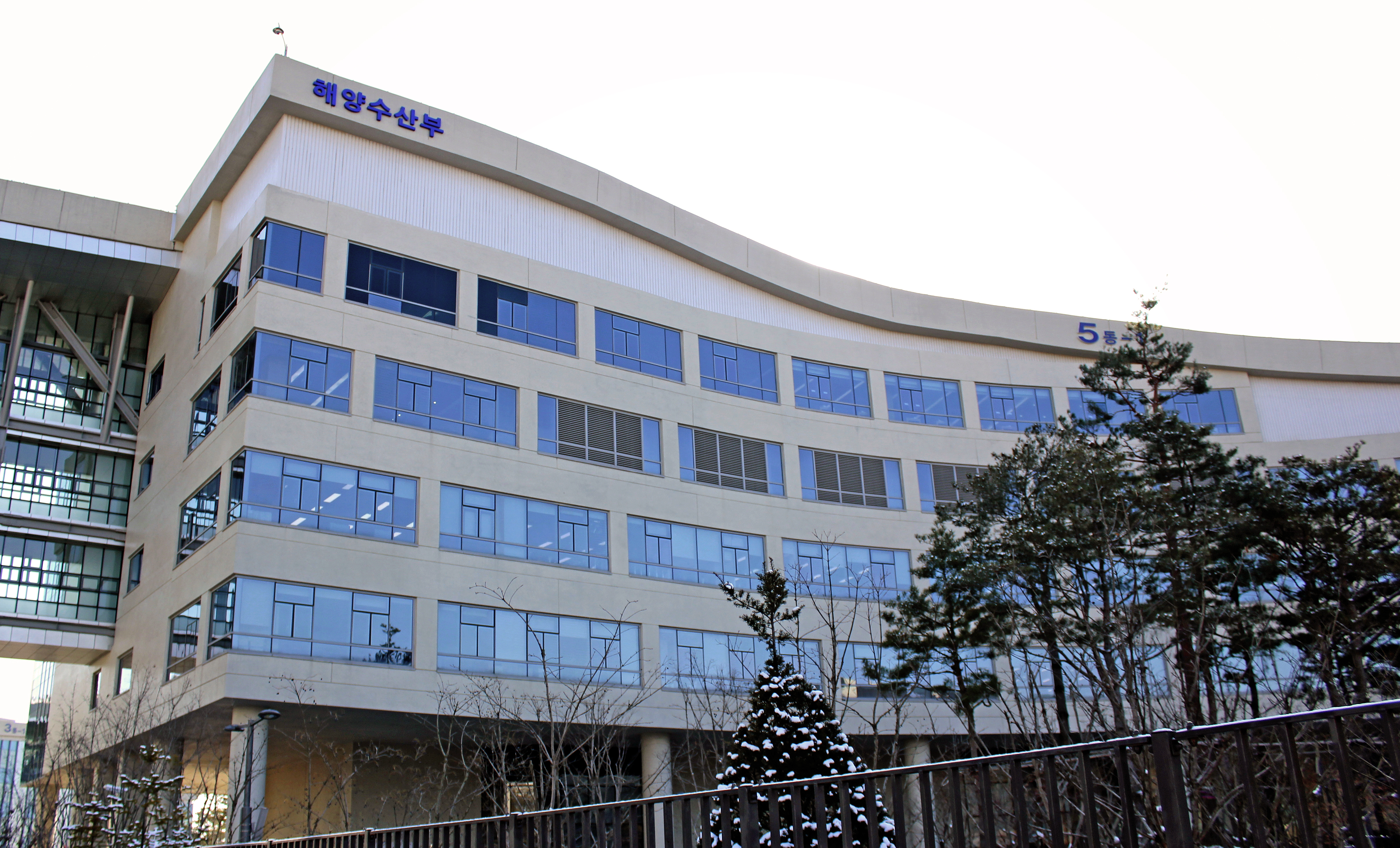
- MOF headquarters in Sejong

Agency overview
- Formed: March 23, 2013
- Preceding agencies: Ministry of Oceans and Fisheries (1996-2008); Ministry for Food, Agriculture, Forestry and Fisheries (2008-2013); Ministry of Land, Transport and Maritime Affairs (2008-2013)
- Jurisdiction: Government of South Korea
- Headquarters: Sejong City
- Minister responsible: Hwang Jong-woo
- Deputy Minister responsible: Kim Sungbum
- Child agency: Korea Coast Guard
- Website: www.mof.go.kr/en/index.do

Korean name
- Hangul: 해양수산부
- Hanja: 海洋水産部
- RR: Haeyang susanbu
- MR: Haeyang susanbu

The Ministry of Oceans and Fisheries (MOF; Korean: 해양수산부) is a cabinet-level organization of the government of South Korea.

== History ==
It takes overall responsibilities for maritime and fisheries sectors in general, ranging from the promotion of maritime safety and security, the protection of the marine environment, the development of port and fishing ports, the research and development on polar issues to the management and sustainable use of fishery resources and the promotion of marine leisure activities. Its headquarters is located at 94 Dasom-2 ro, Sejong City. Before the merger in 2008, the Ministry of Maritime Affairs and Fisheries was located in 140-2 Kye-Dong, Jongro-gu, Seoul City.

MOF was established as part of a general cabinet reorganization in 1996. For the preceding 35 years, maritime functions had been divided among various departments. From 1955 to 1961, under the First Republic, a Ministry of Marine Affairs existed, and the current ministry traces its origin to that body.

In 2008, with the merging of the Ministry of Construction and Transportation and MOMAF, the Ministry of Land, Transport and Maritime Affairs was established. In 2013, the Ministry of Oceans and Fisheries was reestablished with government reorganization.

In 2025, President Lee Jae Myung ordered the ministry to transfer its headquarters to Busan.

== Logos ==
1996~2008

2008~2013

2013~2016

2016~present

== See also ==
- Exclusive economic zone of South Korea
- Fishing industry of South Korea
- Korea Coast Guard
