= Agriculture in South Korea =

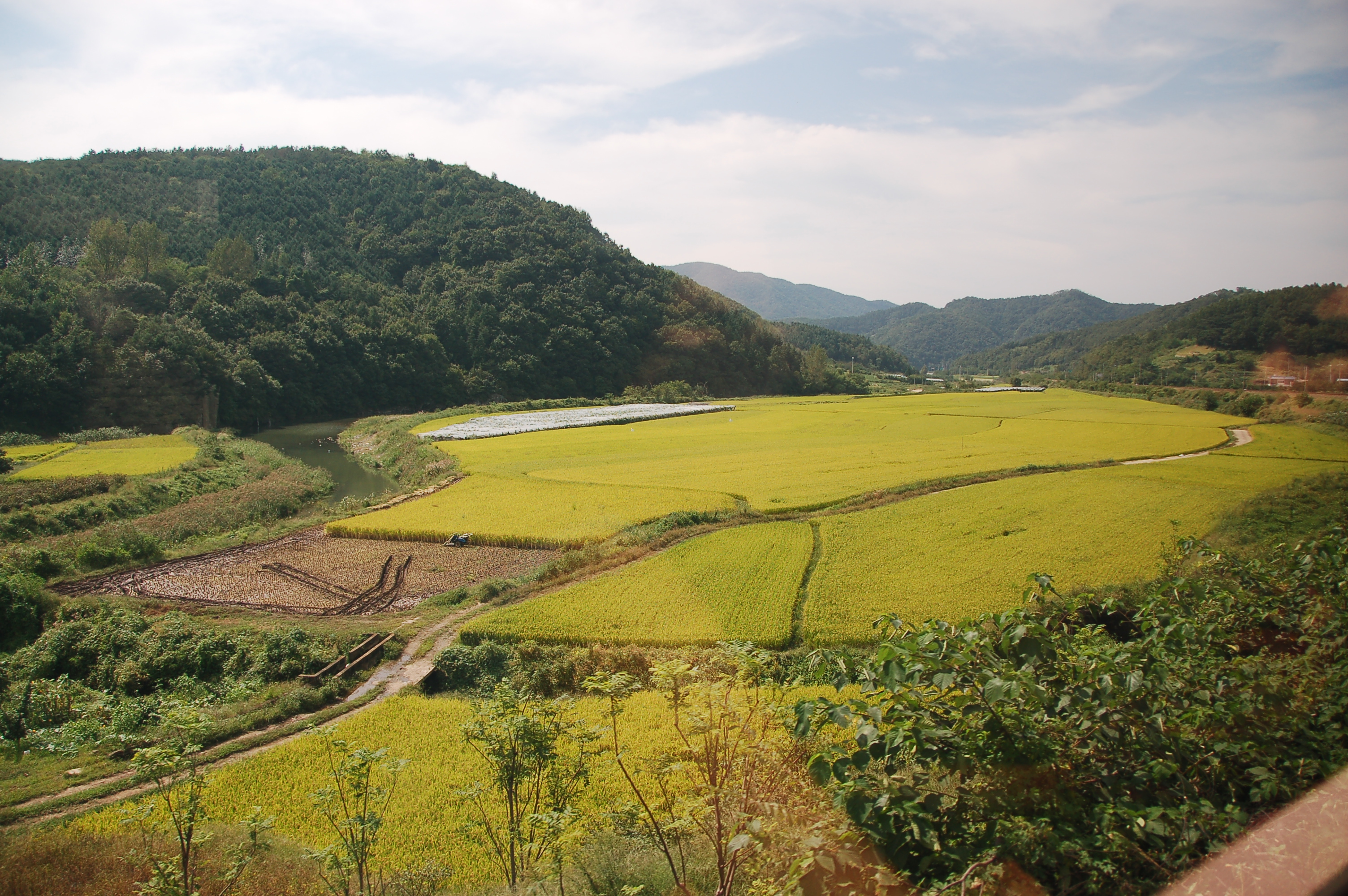
Cultivated fields in Gyeongju, South Korea (2006), display intensive use of land, dominated by the rice crop.

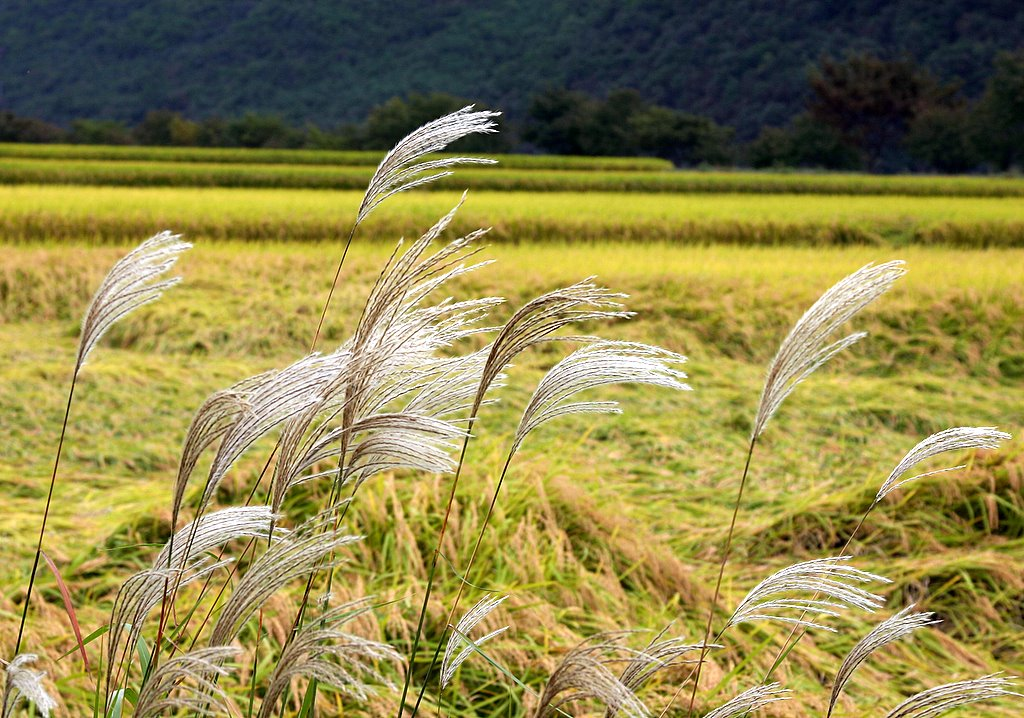
Andong-Hahoe Folk Village (2005) showing high-productivity rice field

Agriculture in South Korea is a sector of the economy of South Korea. Korean agriculture is the basic industry of the Korean economy, consisting of farming, animal husbandry, forestry and fishing. At the time of its founding, Korea was a typical agricultural country, with more than 80% of the population engaged in agricultural production. After land reform under the Syngman Rhee administration, economic revitalization under the Park Chung-hee military government and the wave of world trade liberalization that began in the 1980s, Korean agriculture has undergone dramatic changes. Through the Green Revolution, Korea became self-sufficient in rice, the staple food, in 1978, and in 1996, Korea became the first Asian country after Japan to mechanize its agriculture with fine-grained cultivation. The development of Korean agriculture has also led to the development of agriculture-related industries such as fertilizer, agricultural machinery and seed.

The natural resources required for agriculture in South Korea are not abundant. Two thirds of the country are mountain and hill. Arable land only accounts for 22 percent of the country's land. It is one of the countries with the least arable land per capita in the world. Korea has a very low self-sufficiency rate for agricultural products, except for rice and potatoes, which are largely self-sufficient, while 85% of other foodstuffs need to be imported. In addition, Korea imports more than 60% of its beef, fish and shellfish, 20% of its fruit, poultry and milk from abroad, and only sugar and eggs are self-sufficient. Since the 1980s, with the restructuring of Korean agriculture, the area of food crops has tended to decrease, while the area of high value-added crops, vegetables and fruits has increased in proportion to the plantation industry. The most important crop in South Korea is rice, accounting for about 90 percent of the country's total grain production and over 40 percent of farm income. Other grain products heavily rely on imports from other countries. Farms range in size from small, family-owned farms to large corporations, but most are small-scale and rely heavily on government support and services in order to survive.

In the 1960s, Korea's economy began to grow at a rapid pace, creating the "Han River Miracle". In 2005, the share of agriculture in Korea's GDP fell to 2.9 percent from 50 percent at the start of the country's history. With urbanization and industrialization, Korea's agricultural population has been lost and is aging, with the proportion of people employed in agriculture falling from 50% to 8.5% between 1970 and 2000, and to 7% in 2008.

== History ==
=== Early history ===
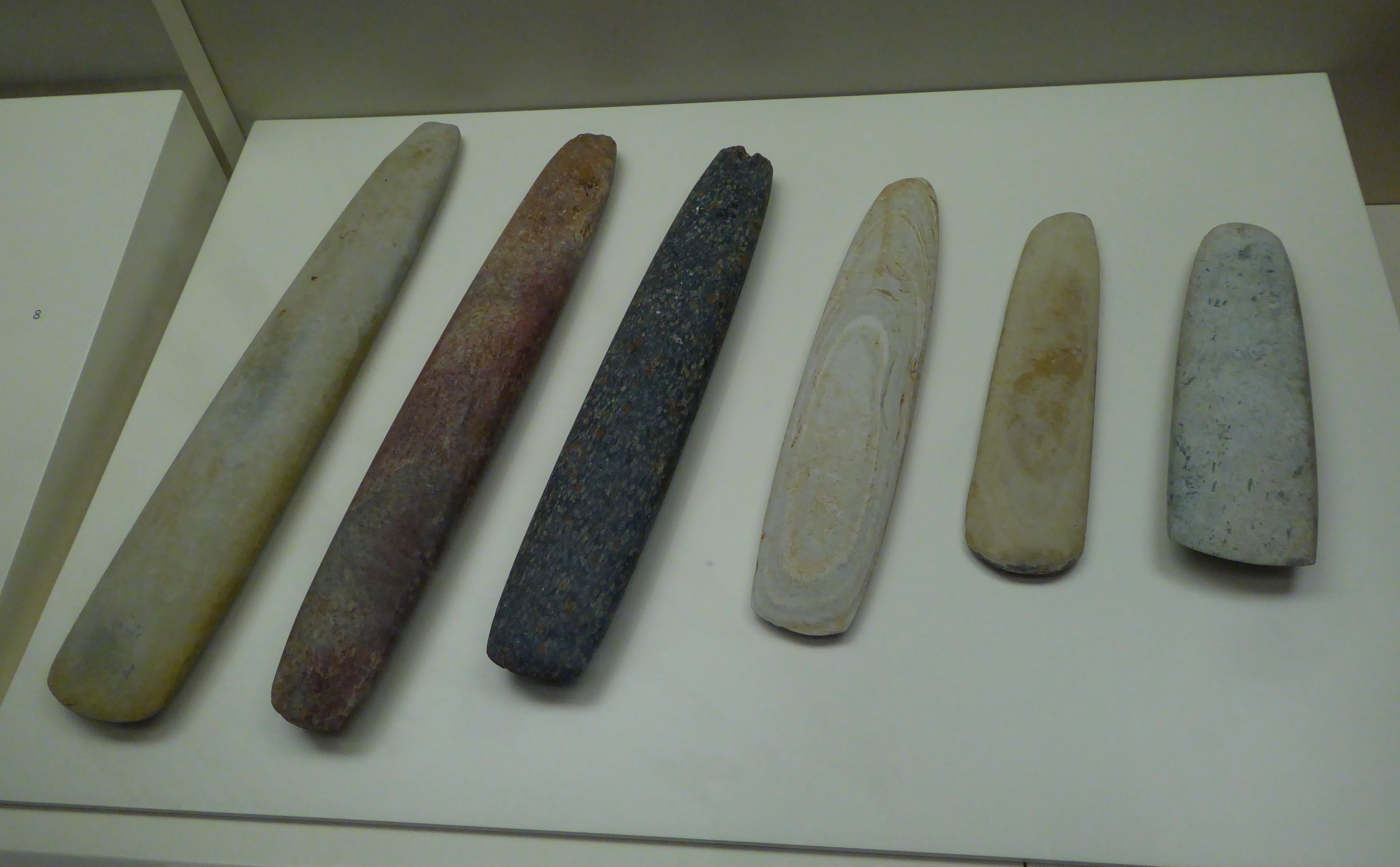
High quality Neolithic polished stone axes from Uljin in Gyeongsangbuk-do

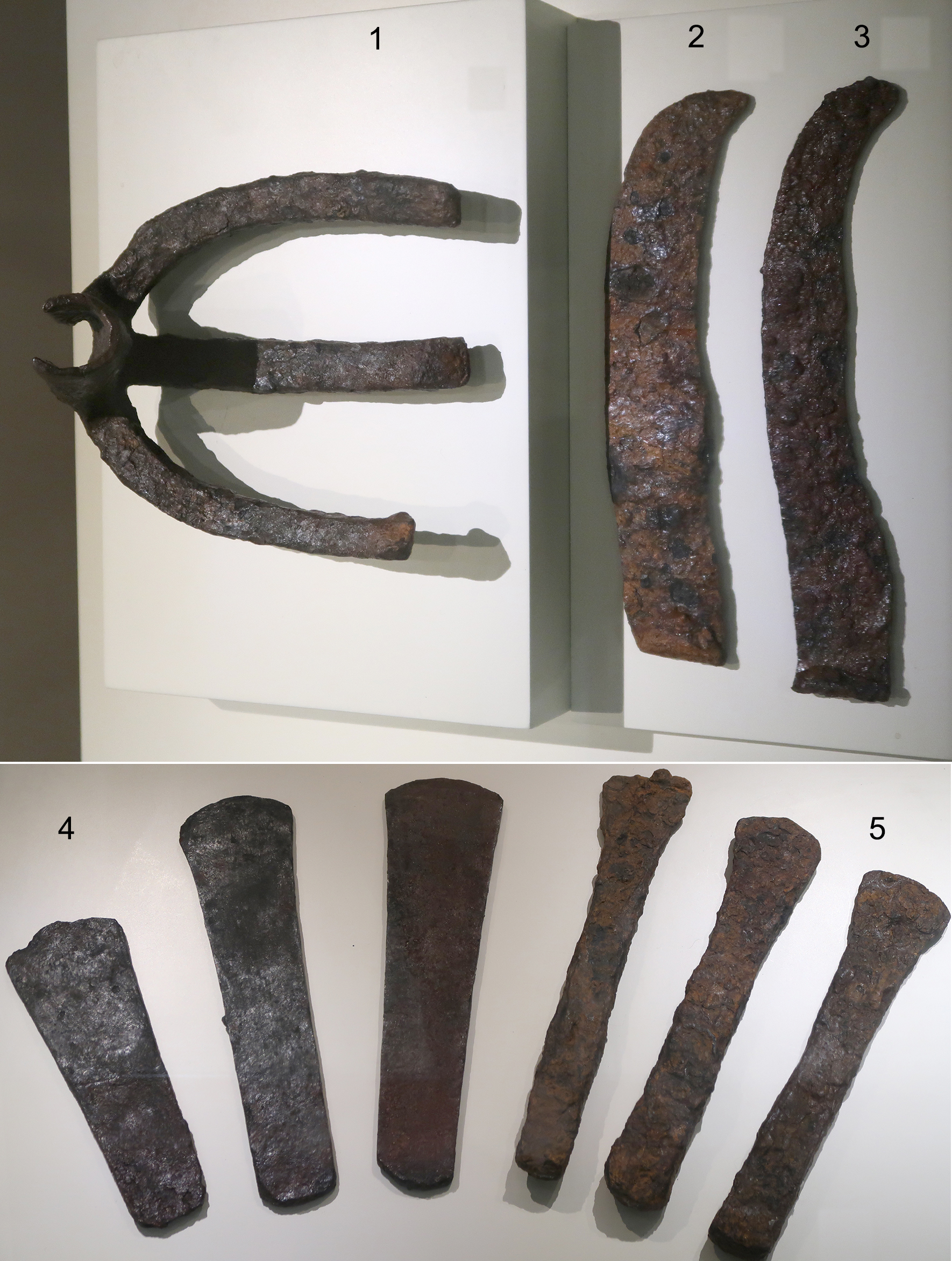
First century Korean iron tools: rake, sickle, axes. The sickles found lead to speculation as to changed planting and harvesting patterns.

During the Paleolithic period (in Korea beginning approximately 10,000 years ago), hunting and gathering took place on the Korean Peninsula. Primitive grain grinding stones and various types of picks excavated from the Neolithic remains at Watpo-ri, Rojin Pioneer City, North Hamgyong Province, indicate that primitive agricultural cultivation had also begun there. Due to low productivity, hunting and gathering were still the main means of survival. Settled subsistence farming and complex societies with mixed crop farming and bulk fish capture are deduced from over 500 Neolithic Korean sites. The Chulmun/Jeulmun sites are an example. Early crops included millet and rice. However, the precise date of domesticated rice cultivation in Korea has been disputed for early periods. It is accepted for 3,000 BC onwards (late Neolithic) as infrequent, but very frequent for the Bronze Age onwards (in Korea 1300 - 300 BC). It has also been suggested that the Bronze Age culture of Songguk-ri provides evidence of a change in subsistence strategy to the establishment of rice paddy culture and away from a hunter-gatherer emphasis. During the Bronze Age, the production of bronze agricultural tools indicates the importance of agriculture as against hunting and gathering. Based on remains of rice at Songguk-ri, it is considered that at this time, rice was a community food, not the luxury/ currency that it became in historical times. At the beginning of the Iron Age, irrigated plow farming methods began to appear, and productivity was further improved. Iron sickles are thought to indicate that longer-grain plumper rice varieties ripened together and were harvested together.

=== 8th to 14th centuries ===
In the Silla period (57 BC- 935) there were government programmes for securing the promulgation of better seeds, of irrigation and for reduction of pests. The early study of agronomy and the means of improving agricultural practice are seen in public farming during the reign of Seongdeok of Silla (AD 722). Heungdeok of Silla in the early ninth century secured the introduction of ginseng seeds from Tang China and growth of them experimentally in Chiri/ Jirisan. At this time, teas and silk were also propagated.

In the Goryeo period (918-1392), various farm tools were invented (spades, plows, shovels) and water wheels were introduced from South China. In 1365 cotton was brought for cultivation from the area of Vietnam.

=== The Joseon dynasty ===
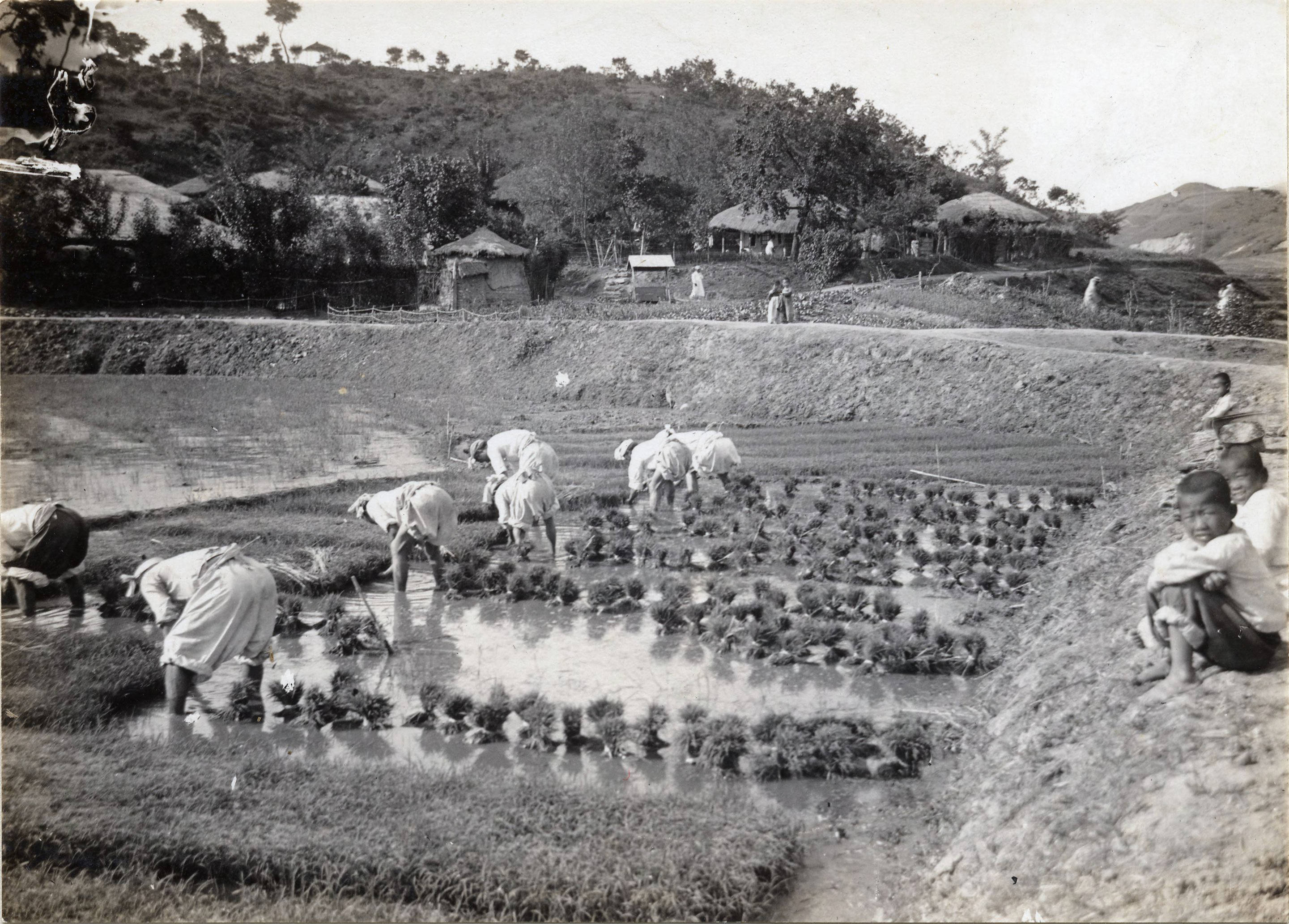
Transplanting by hand method of cultivation, photographed in the early 20th century. This can be seen to be slow, labour-intensive work requiring high levels of rural population.

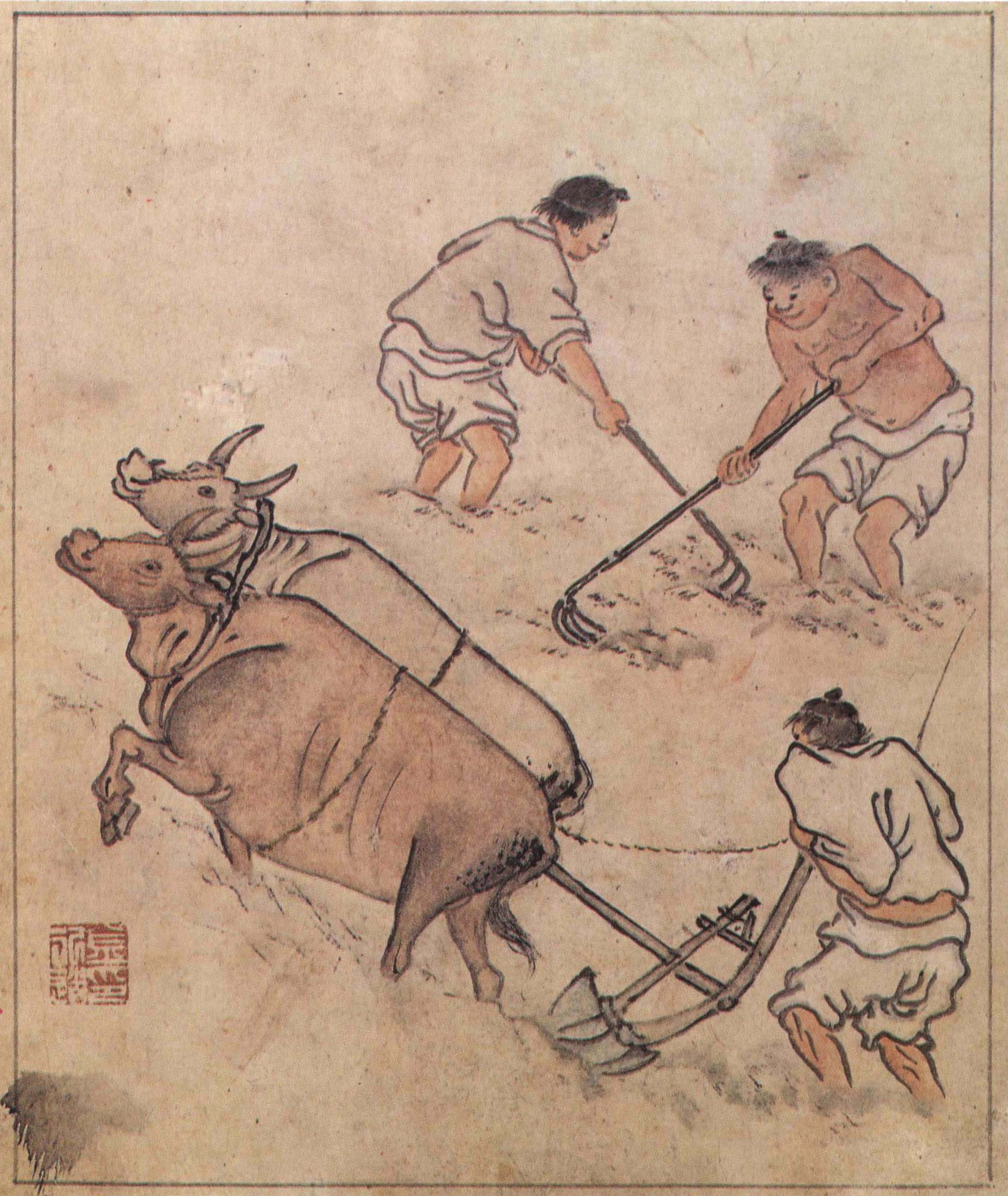
Plowing a rice field c1780 by Kim Hong-do 1745-1806 (aka Danwon), one of Korea's greatest painters. The plow is pulled through heavy ankle-deep mud by a team of two bullocks.

According to the oldest agricultural book in South Korea, "Nongsa chiksŏl", in the 15th century, the most extensive agricultural cultivations in South Korea were yellow rice, millet, soybeans and rice, followed by crops such as wheat and ginseng. In the mid- sixteenth century, the transplanting method gradually became a common method of paddy field cultivation. In the 18th century, the transplanting method was not only extended to Tianshui paddy fields (rice fields that can only be irrigated by rain), but also used in paddy and dry land agriculture. The original direct seeding method of planting rice was also improved. Fertilisation techniques date from the 16th century, and from the 18th century irrigation and double-cropping of mixed crops ensured high produce yields.

Writings in agronomy flourished in the 18th and early 19th centuries. Pak Chiwŏn was one of several contemporary writers attempting to improve production methods in Korea.

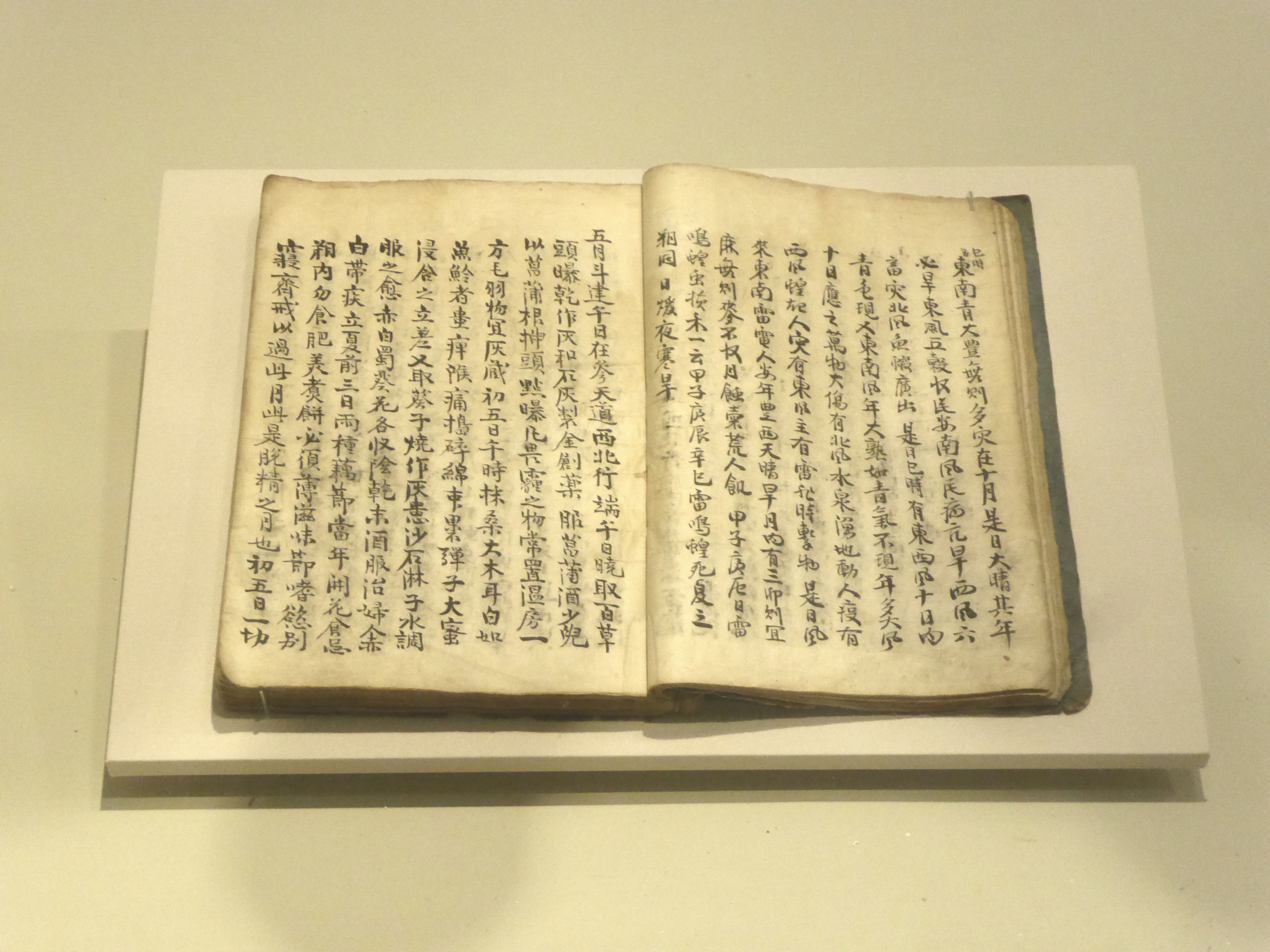
Part of a flourishing farming literature is this 16 volume work in manuscript (1766), Jeungbo sallim gyeongje (Revised Farm Management) by Yu Jung-rim, a doctor.

During the Joseon Dynasty, agriculture developed to a more advanced level again, but forest degradation was a major result of the firewood burning heating systems of homes. In the 18th century rationalist scholar Seo Yu Gu, author of the 113-volume Encyclopedia Koreana on Rural Living, complained about the huge cost and environmental impact of the heating systems (Ondol). By the 19th century Ondol had caused whole mountains to be completely bare and prone to landslides in rain whereby crops were destroyed. According to the Geography Records of Sejong, the agricultural early field in the early Joseon Dynasty had an absolute advantage: the estimated ratio of water early field in Gyeonggi Province and other areas was 28% to 72%.

=== The 20th century ===
==== The Japanese colonial period 1910-1945 ====
From 1907 Japanese nationals were legally able to own Korean farmland. The Oriental Development Company (a Japanese concern) was set up in 1908 with the aim of controlling Korean lands, initially under its 10-year plan. By 1916 that company owned approximately 104,000 hectares of Korean farmland. The Land Survey Bureau of the Governor-General embarked upon a recording of ownerships and boundaries, a process said to have led to educated yangban exploiting the system for their own benefit and to some 331,748 farmers finding they were landless and needing to work the land of another. In the period 1910 - 1925 over 278,000 farmers emigrated to Manchuria, and a further 126,000 left for unskilled labouring jobs in Japan. Japanese fiscal policy designed to modernise and increase production saw production rise, but not so as to keep pace with exports of food to Japan. Efforts were made to bridge the Korean food gap with coarse grain imported from Manchuria but extreme poverty and regular starvation of the Korean peasant class (73.6% of the Korean population) resulted.

The Japanese founded around 1920 the first Korean agriculture college, at Suwon. The college ran Stations for the students, each with a specific focus. Thus, for example, there were the Silk Worm Station, the Forest Station, the Agricultural Experimentation Station, and the Animal-care Station. Around one quarter of the students were Korean.

==== After the Second World War ====
In the 1945-1960 period, annual increases of farm production took place. The agricultural industry in this period experienced land redistribution, rural poverty and late investment as well as the disruption of war.

The Farmland Reform Law of 1949 abolishing tenancies in South Korea was designed to effect changes in land tenure. Under the new law, the government purchased land from landlords then allocated a maximum of 3 hectares of land to each farmer. In the 4 years prior to it, 44% of tenanted land was sold. The remaining 56% was redistributed under the reform. This affected approximately 470,000 hectares of agricultural land. Owner-operators were 14% of total in 1945, rising to 70% by 1965.

Government policy in the years immediately following the Korean War 1950-1953 did not permit of much investment in agriculture, despite its importance to many people, because of the urgent need to reinvest in defence and reconstruction. Less than 10% of spending went for agriculture, and was largely limited to restoration works for irrigation and purchase of fertiliser from the United States. Grain imports from the US met food gaps.

In 1957 of 9.5 million cultivated hectares 21% was forest land, 17% was uplands, 8.6% was rice paddies and 7.7 was for "miscellaneous" uses. Land was nowhere used exclusively for livestock pasture. The per-farmer-cultivated area was 1.1 acres. The 1953-7 period saw a 5 year plan for agriculture, to be followed by a further 5 year plan commencing in 1958. Improvements to land, and their financing, were intended by the Agriculture Guidance Law of 1957. The Academy of Agriculture (1957) was followed by creation of a specialised agricultural lending bank in 1958 (after the 1957 Agricultural Bank Law). In its first year of operation (1958) it loaned out 78,856 million hwan using the rice crops as security. The Federation of Farmers' Cooperatives was initiated in 1958. In 1957 the large areas classified as forests included 49% wasteland as a result of erosion, and the remaining forests were thinly covered by trees, half of which were seedlings only. The cause of the degradation was traditional Korean under-floor heating which burned trees, leaves and timber. In the late 1950s this consumed 16 million tons of firewood annually.

==== 1960 onwards ====
A shift in policy towards expanding food production in the early 1960s led to scale investment in agriculture to 20% of government spending overall. This different policy was reflected in the 5 year plans for self-sustaining economic expansion 1962-1966 and 1967-1971.

National Agricultural Cooperative Federation (NACF) is South Korea's agricultural cooperative, which is a nationwide organization in charge of agriculture banking, supply of agriculture input factors and sales of agriculture products. The NACF was founded in 1961 with the goal of "improving the economic, social, cultural and status of agriculture people and enhancing the competitiveness of agriculture to improve the quality of life of farmers and contribute to the balanced development of the national economy. 1962 saw the creation of the Office of Rural Development, but grain prices were kept low so as to prevent inflation and keep labour costs low in an economy where over half of industrial wages were spent on food. Food imports made up the 95% drop in self-sufficiency

Following on the reform of the land equalization system after World War II, South Korea's policy reclaimed the land occupied by Japanese officials and citizens and allocated it to South Korean farmers. It promulgated the Land Reform Law to purchase more than 3 hectares of land from farmers at low prices, and sold it to tenants at a lower price. After this round of land reform, South Korea basically achieved the goal of a land equalization system.

The next step was to support intensive distribution of land. In the 15 years following 1961, South Korea completed the transition from an agricultural country to an industrial country. The government begun gradually to loosen restrictions on land sales and to encourage active working farmers to return their land. Farmers engaged in agriculture also expanded their scale of business.

==== 1970 onwards ====
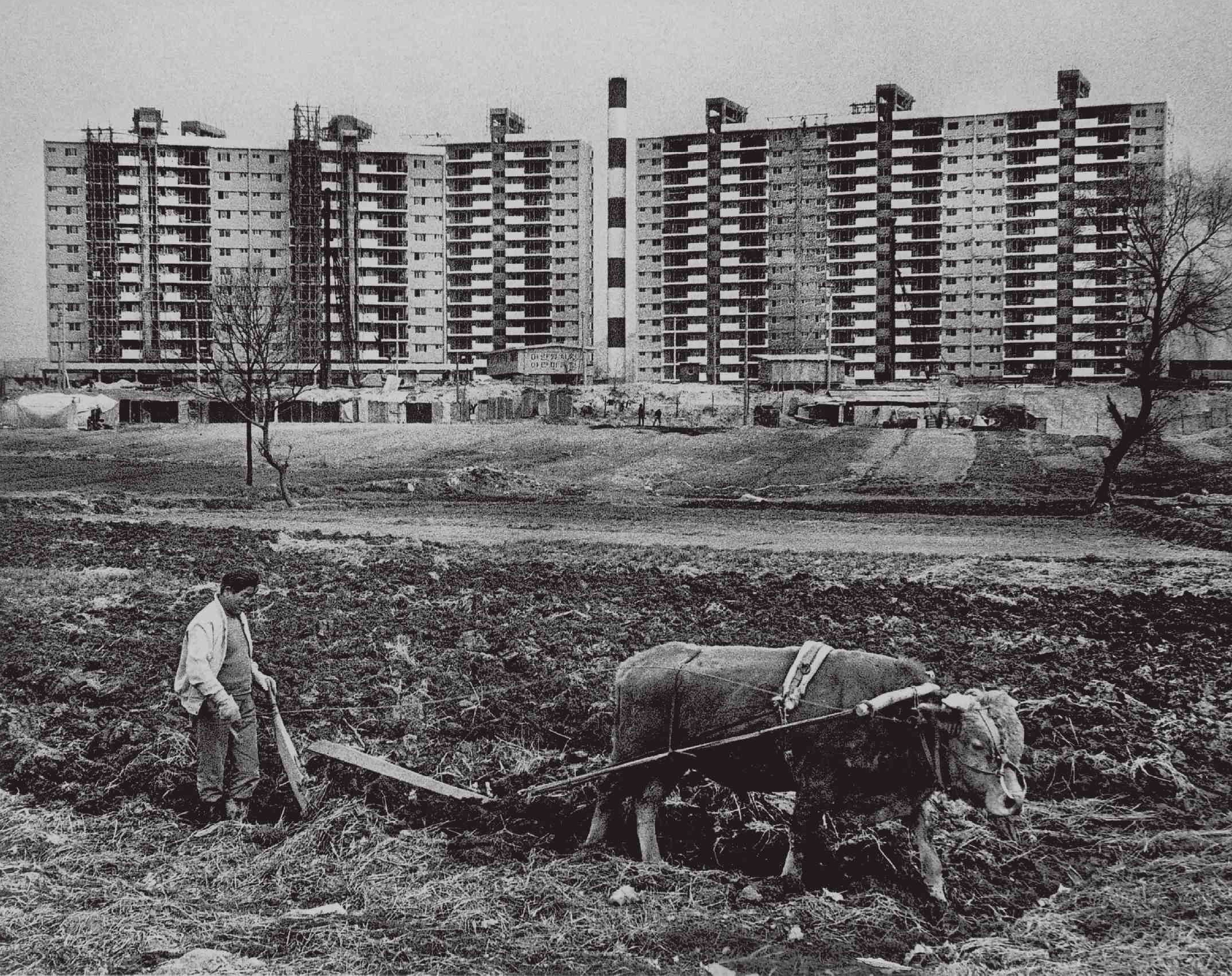
The 1970s saw the expansion of urban areas as well as retrenchment of a food production focus in policy. Here is a farmer plowing for the last season before Seoul expands onto his land (1978).

Policy in the 1970s for agricultural expansion included the Saemaul (New Community) Movement to promote rural industrial infrastructure development. Higher grain prices were permitted and food imports were limited so as to cover only gaps in domestic output. This policy also included higher purchase prices by government for grain producers, but lower sale prices for industrial labour-force consumption. The deficit was financed by the Bank of Korea on overdraft, which led in the late 1970s to policy modification.

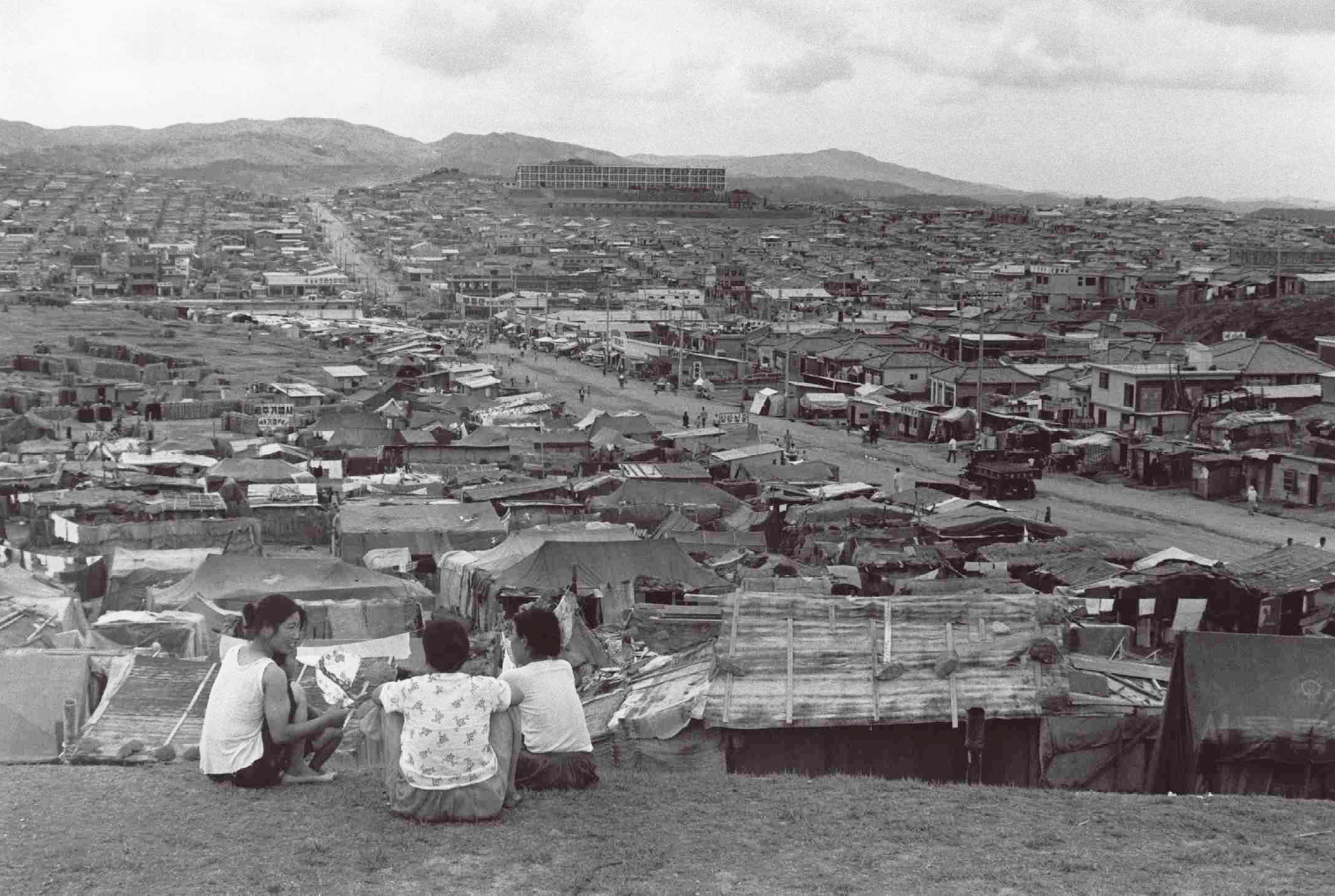
Rural depopulation led to over-rapid population increases in cities, above all in Seoul. Price payments to agriculture had to be coupled with protective pricing for the urban dwellers. Here a shanty town is photographed in 1971.

In the 1970s, the global oil crisis and the outbreak of food shortages forced South Korea to promulgate the Agricultural Land Protection and Utilization Act in 1972, which strictly restricted the conversion of agricultural land to other uses. In 1975, South Korea enacted the Agricultural Land Expansion and Development Promotion Law.

The implementation of the Agricultural and Fishery Village Development Special Measures Law in the late 1980s changed the ownership of land away from the original ownership of independent family farms so as to allow companies legally to engage in land ownership. The smallholder structure of Korean agriculture hindered economies of scale and limited participation in marketing and modernisation schemes.

==== 1980 onwards ====
The Farm Household Income Source Development Act in 1981 was designed to further enhance non-farming income in rural areas by relocating industries there, despite concerns that it might provoke land price inflation.

==== 1990 onwards ====
In 1994, South Korea enacted a new Farm Land Basic Law, which further relaxed restrictions on land sales and leases, allowing the establishment of agricultural corporations with a maximum of 100 hectares of land. The new Agricultural Land Law integrated previous agricultural land law and regulations. Although the Agricultural Land Law followed the principle of farmers owning their land, restrictions on land ownership and use rights were significantly relaxed. The government offered farmers over the age of 65 years a subsidy of US$2,580 per hectare if they were to sell or lease their land for more than 5 years to active farmers.

=== The 21st century ===
==== General ====
Following on the general liberalisation of land ownership and use in the late 20th century, in 2002, all restrictions on land ownership were finally abolished. In a 2023 study of the impact of climate change and technology on South Korean rice production, it was concluded that farmer awareness of fertiliser and pesticide improved use was needed. It recommended that future food security issues would easiest be safeguarded against by allotting arable land to more efficient farmers. In a detailed market analysis in 2023 it was concluded that due to recent policy changes farm households were increasing and that incomes were increasing. A study in 2020 indicate that a 12% average increase in productivity is associated with government direct payments and is an effective policy tool.

==== Trends following urbanisation ====
With the rapid growth of South Korea's economy and urbanization, areas of farmland have been decreasing and rural populations have moved from the countryside to cities. In addition to the decrease in farmland, there has been a decrease in rice demand due to the declining rates of rice consumption. These trends continued in 2022 and 2023. In 1980, the average consumption of rice per capita was 137.7 kg. In 2018, only 61 kg of rice was eaten per capita. This decrease is partially due to the rise of wheat consumption. In 2016, the average South Korean consumed 33.2 kg of wheat flour.

==== Urban agriculture ====
In November 2011, the government passed the Act on Development and Support of Urban Agriculture. It was based upon the National Land Planning and Utilization Act which strives to create more farmland. The goal of the Act was to "develop a nature-friendly urban environment and contribute to the harmonious development of cities and rural communities by raising urban residents' understanding in agriculture". The Act authorises the creation of comprehensive 5 year plans by the Minister of Agriculture, Food and Rural Affairs for the advancement of safe urban agriculture and the revitalisation of that sector. There must be annual public reports on progress by the Minister of Agriculture, Food and Rural Affairs and any relevant Mayor/Do Governor. Plans are scrutinised by an Urban Agriculture Council, and if need be modified. The Minister may provide suitable training and basic supplies. The Minister may also start up and keep up to date an integrated urban agricultural information system. Types of location suitable for such a project are specified. Land may be selected for public urban farms.

Seoul, South Korea's capital and largest, densest city, developed four categories of urban agriculture. These were: "housing" which included private homes and apartments, both indoors and outdoors; "in-city" meaning the rooftops of public buildings; "farm-park" using abandoned land; and "education" including schools and colleges. To promote the idea of urban agriculture, the municipal government of Seoul offered agricultural training classes and supplies (such as seeds, tools, and containers) to interested residents. By 2015, the municipal government had assisted in the development of "vegetable gardens on the rooftops of 267 buildings" and had provided "43,785 box-typed vegetable pots for 15,866 places".

The presence of urban farming has a significant positive effect on housing prices in the area within 500 metres of it. The satisfaction of participants in the urban farming scheme in Seoul shows (2017) marked differences depending on the length of involvement, the supply by the local authority and the participation of women.

==== Smart farming ====
Due to challenges with an aging population of farmers, a shrinking number of farm laborers, the weakening of the Korea domestic farm market, and uncommon weather patterns, the government of South Korea has been promoting the idea of smart farms to farmers. By offering financial and training support, the government hoped to "bolster the competitiveness of domestic agriculture". Smart farms use information and communication technologies (ICT) to send real time information to farmers' mobile devices. Though the government has promoted smart farms, only a small percentage of farms have begun using the technology. Most farmers remain unable to afford this technology or may not have the skills required for a "digital environment". In 2019, the agriculture ministry announced that 248 billion won would be budgeted for promoting smart farm technology. The expenditure is planned with specific achievement targets so as to make holistic change in the direction of rural regeneration and to counterbalance the aging of the Korean farmer base where over half were as at 2021 over the age of 65).

==== Agriculture Plan 2023-2027 ====
A major focus of the 2023-2027 Agriculture Plan is the need to increase the percentage of "young" farmers (meaning aged under 40) up to 10% of total farmers by the close of the plan period. Encouragement takes the form of direct monthly payments for persons relocating from urban areas, and generous farm loan terms (loans spread over 25 years not 15). The need is for high tech, AI-assisted and digital farming. Education and consultancy services are to be provided by way of support. A development fund of 100 billion won is available to cover support for housing and other needs. In 2024 4,000 young farmers will be provided for 3 years with a monthly 1.1 million won (785 Euros approximately, 2023 values).

== Resources ==
=== Farmland ===
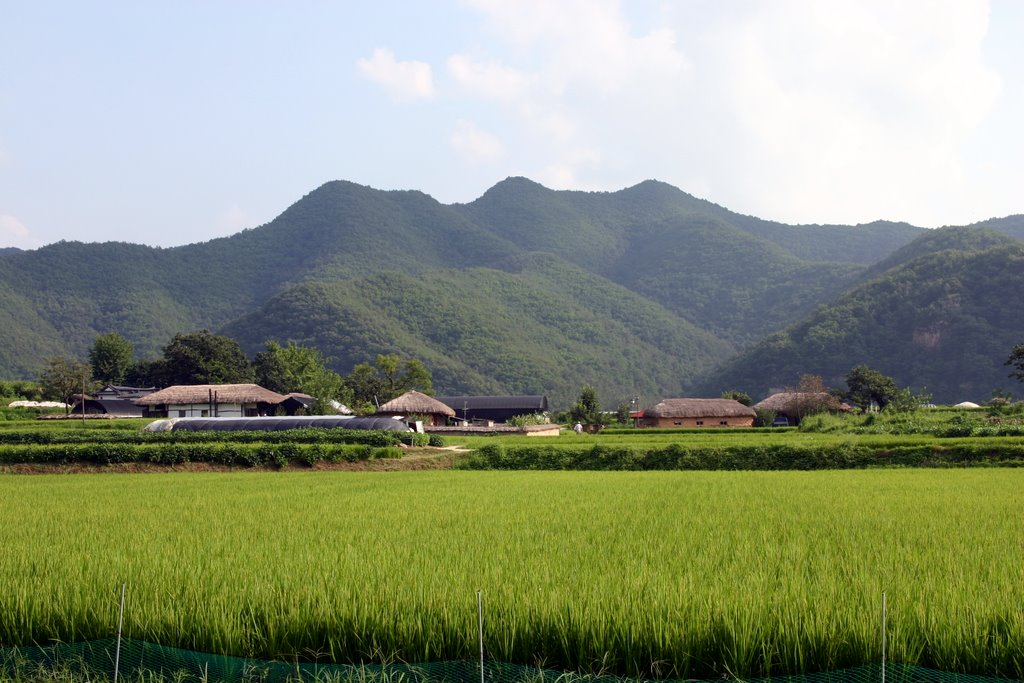
Korea-Andong-Hahoe Folk Village

With the development of urbanization and industrialization, South Korea's self-sufficiency rate in food is decreasing due to the continuous decline of arable land. In 2011, the area of rice fields in South Korea was approximately 854,000 hectares, accounting for 50.3% of the cultivated land area. By 2019 (at 1.58 million hectares) there had been a 29% decrease in the area of farmed land due to industrial and housing uses replacing farming. In 2022, South Korea's agricultural land area was 1.698 million hectares, accounting for 17% of South Korea's land area, of which two-thirds of the arable land was paddy fields, mainly for the cultivation of rice.

=== Agricultural population ===
==== Ageing of rural population ====
With the rapid development of South Korea's industrialization and urbanization, the percentage contribution of agriculture in South Korea's GDP and the percentage of agriculturalists within the total population have both seen rapid decline. From 1970 to 2005, the share of agriculture in South Korea's GDP fell from 25.5% to 2.9%, an average annual decline of 6%. The percentage of agriculturalists in the total population of South Korea fell in the same period from 49.5% to 7.6%, an average annual decline of 5.2%. The decline in the agricultural population is slower than the decline in the percentage contribution of agriculture in GDP. Accordingly, there has evolved a surplus of agricultural population. Statistics show that overpopulation in agriculture is also due to the fact that people over the age of 40 cannot find jobs in new industries and so turn to agriculture. The average age of the agricultural population has increased, which may be regarded as reducing competitiveness of the structure of the labor force.

==== Decreasing affluence of rural population ====
As the agricultural population ages, the family size and income situation of South Korean farming households has deteriorated. In the 1960s, the average number of family members contributing towards farming households was six. By 2005, this number decreased to 2.7. The number of farming households with less than two members is growing rapidly. From 1995 to 2005, the proportion of farm operators under the age of 50 fell from 27.9% to 17.0%, while the proportion of farm operators above the age of 70 increased from 12.7% to 24.3%.

Meanwhile, the income gap between farmers and urban residents began to widen. In the mid-1990s, the income of farm households was 90 percent of the income of urban households. By 2009, this figure had dropped to 66.0%. The 2023 published statistic for average farm household income is 46,153 won.

=== Agricultural cooperatives ===
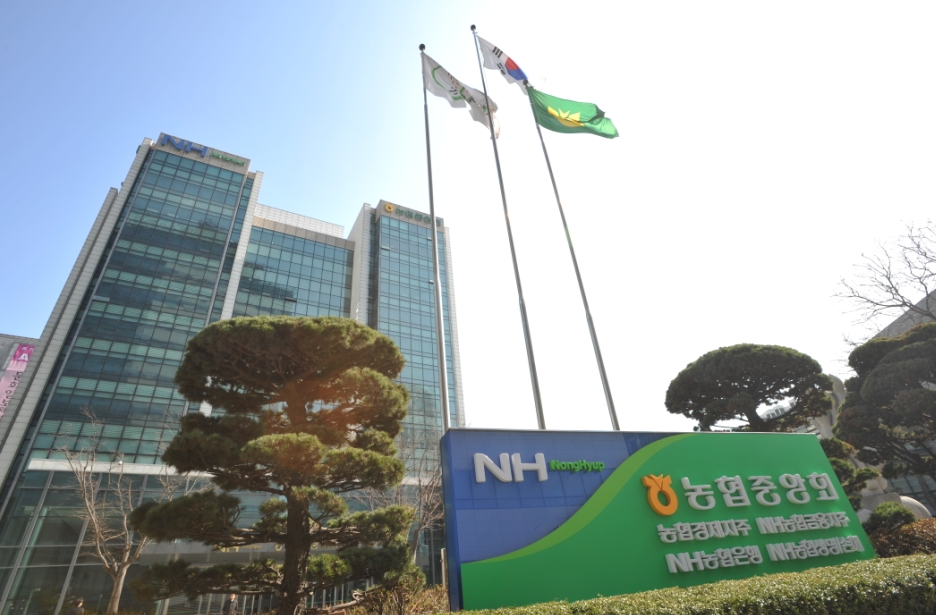
NACF headquarters

Ninety-eight percent of agricultural households in South Korea are members of agricultural cooperatives. The greatest achievement of South Korean agricultural cooperatives, which is recognised internationally, is that they have solved the problem of pernicious unfairly high interest rates on loans. This problem is a widespread one in underdeveloped economies worldwide.

Agricultural cooperatives in South Korea were originally only responsible for economic activities such as the marketing of agricultural products, while financial operations were handled by agricultural banks. In order to solve the problem of financing cooperatives, the Agricultural Cooperative Association Act was enacted on 29 July 1961 to integrate agricultural cooperatives and agricultural banks into a national agricultural cooperative organisation. In 1981, the city-run co-operative became a branch of the Central Association of Agricultural Co-operatives and lost its independent legal personality, thus creating a two-tier system comprising grassroots co-operatives and also the Central Association of Agricultural Co-operatives. On 5 February and 9 September 1999, the new Basic Act on Agriculture and Rural Development and the Act on Agricultural Cooperatives were enacted. The former Central Association of Agricultural Cooperatives, the Central Association of Pastoral Cooperatives and the Central Association of Ginseng Cooperatives were merged into the National Central Association of Agricultural Cooperatives, which has one legal personality. The grassroots cooperatives were divided into regional agricultural cooperatives, regional pastoral cooperatives, specialized agricultural cooperatives and specialized agricultural cooperative federations, so that comprehensive and specialized cooperatives could coexist and complement each other.

South Korean agricultural cooperatives are generally considered to be more focused on the more profitable banking business at the expense of agricultural marketing, and their marketing role has become particularly important to farmers since the 1990s as agricultural trade liberalization has deepened. In response, agricultural cooperatives have made plans to strengthen their marketing business.

== Types of production ==
=== Crops ===
==== The grain industry ====
The main crop grown for food in South Korea is rice. Eighty percent of South Korea's agricultural population is involved in rice production, and 54 percent of the arable land is rice fields. In 1978, South Korea became self-sufficient in rice through the promotion of new high-yielding rice varieties. Mechanization of rice field operations was achieved in 1996. In addition to rice, the main food crops in South Korea are barley, soybeans, corn and wheat. These crops are mainly used for processing in South Korea, and only a small proportion is used for human consumption. With the exception of rice, which is self-sufficient, South Korea's self-sufficiency in food production is very low and requires significant imports. Wheat and maize have a self-sufficiency rate of less than 1% and are almost entirely dependent on imports. For grains other than rice the self-sufficiency rate fell below 20% in 2020. Overall grain self-sufficiency including rice is now targeted by the South Korean government's 2023 policies to be raised to 55% by 2027.

==== Rice ====
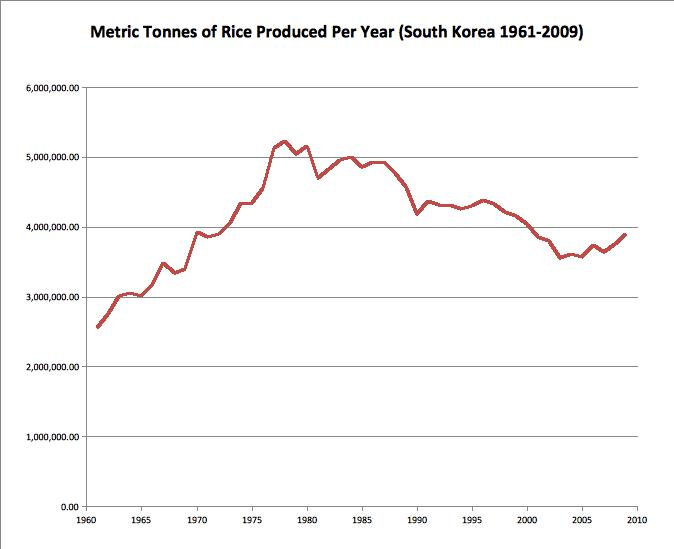
South Korean Rice Production 1961-2009

===== Reduced rice production, consumption and labour supply =====
Rice is the most widely grown crop in South Korea. In 2009, it was grown on 924,000 hectares of land, accounting for 53.2% of the country's agricultural land, and for 82% of the country's agricultural population. Since the 21st century, with the increasing westernization of South Korean dietary habits, the per capita consumption of rice in South Korea has been decreasing year by year. In 2009, the total production of rice in South Korea decreased from 5.606 million tons in 1990 to 4.916 million tons. The area of rice fields decreased from 1.244 million hectares in 1990 to 924,000 hectares in 2009. Korean rice cultivation by irrigated fields is more biodiverse than that by terracing and the need to integrate good management has been recognised as a possible solution to reduced rural manpower.

===== Rice imports into South Korea =====
Between 1990 and 1994, South Korea bought an average of 22-30% of its domestic rice production at 1.2 times the market price each year, resulting in an oversupply of rice. With the Uruguay Round negotiations in 1993 and the establishment of the World Trade Organisation in 1995, South Korea began to reduce its rice subsidies in line with its international commitments. Accordingly, in 2004, South Korea's rice subsidies fell from 21.8 trillion won in 1995 to 14.9 trillion won. There remains an oversupply of rice in South Korea. According to relevant international agreements, South Korea has to import a certain amount of rice from China, the United States and other countries every year. US imported rice is auctioned on a weekly basis. Auctions resumed in June 2023 after a 9 month hiatus in September 2022.

==== Barley ====
Barley used to be an important substitute for rice in Korea in times of food shortage. With the increase in rice production and wheat imports, barley has lost its status as a major food crop in South Korea. In 2006, the area planted with barley in South Korea had fallen to 5.7 hectares from 730,000 hectares in 1970. Eighty percent of South Korea's barley demand is for processing and is mainly imported, with human consumption demand accounting for only 15 percent of total demand. Historically, the South Korean government adopted the same high price policy for barley as for rice. The barley market has been liberalized since the Uruguay Round negotiations in 1993. From 1990 to 2011, South Korea's self-sufficiency rate for barley fell from 96.1 percent to 22.5 percent.

==== Soybean ====
South Korea has an annual demand for soybeans of 1.3-1.6 million tonnes and is largely dependent on imports. Soybeans are mainly used for fodder processing in South Korea, with consumption of edible soybeans accounting for only 3.97% of total production. Historically, South Korea had implemented government above-market price purchases to boost soybean production. To alleviate the problem of rice supply exceeding demand, the Korean government also encouraged farmers to grow soybeans in their rice fields and set the purchase price of soybeans in rice fields at the level of income from rice cultivation. With the implementation of South Korea's import liberalization policy, government procurement has been significantly reduced. South Korea's soybean self-sufficiency rate, which had been as high as 99.4% in 1966, began to decline steadily in 1969, falling to just 6.4% in 2011.

==== Maize ====
Maize is also one of the commodities purchased and stockpiled by the South Korean government. Maize consumption in Korea is almost entirely for processing, with food consumption accounting for only 0.9 percent of total consumption. Production of maize in South Korea is very low, and in 2011 the country was only 0.8% self-sufficient in maize.

==== Wheat ====
Wheat was the first crop to be affected by market liberalization in South Korea. In 1966, the country's wheat self-sufficiency rate was 43.4%. It then declined rapidly year on year such that from 1972 onwards, South Korea's wheat self-sufficiency rate fell below 10%. In 1984, the government stopped the government wheat purchase programme. Since then, South Korea's wheat self-sufficiency rate has been less than 1% and consumption is almost entirely dependent on imports. South Korea's main wheat suppliers are the USA, Australia and Canada.

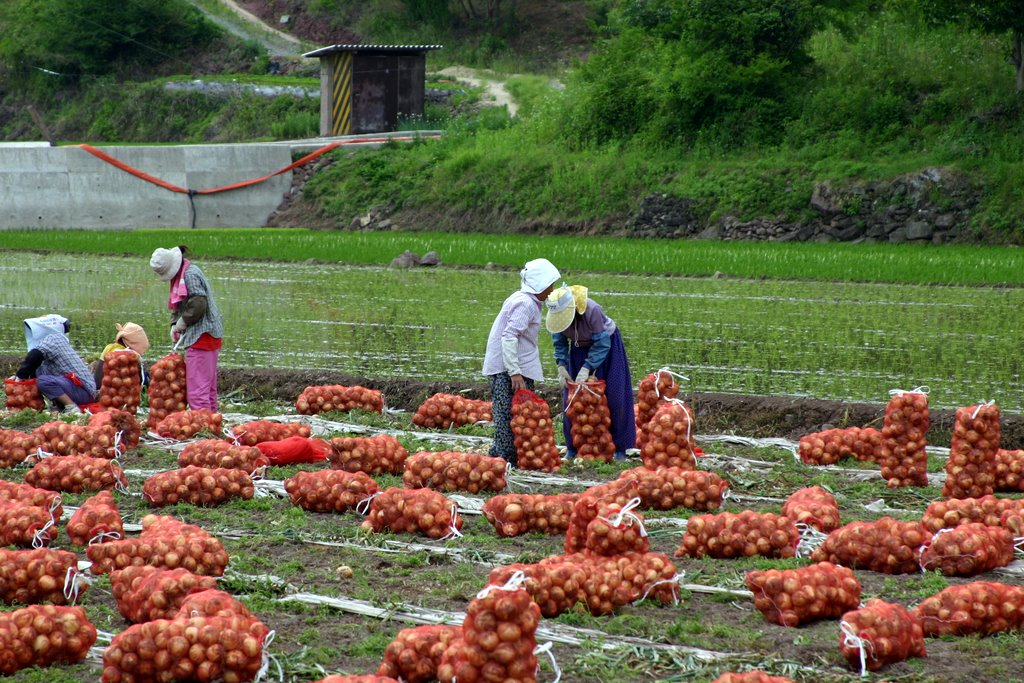
Korea-Andong-Gohari-Harvesting onions

==== Horticulture and special crops ====
Since joining the World Trade Organisation, the acreage of vegetables and fruits in South Korea has been declining, although the total production of vegetables and fruits has been increasing due to technological progress and the increase in the acreage of greenhouse vegetables. In 2009, the acreage of vegetables and fruits in South Korea was 280,000 hectares and 157,000 hectares respectively, and the production was 1.3 million tons and 2.88 million tons respectively. Due to the liberalization of agricultural products, the share of the output value of the vegetable and fruit industries in the total agricultural output value has been on the decline. The share of vegetables at 46.7 percent in 1995 fell to 18.3 percent in 2009. The share of fruits at 11.7 percent in 1995 fell to 8.5 percent in 2009. In the Korean vegetable market as surveyed in 2023, for certain key crops (cabbage, garlic and radish) price variations are considered to result from levels of domestic output. By contrast, the variations for dried red pepper and onions correlate to changes in levels of imports and exports. There is not a uniform pattern of price response.

The area under flower cultivation in South Korea shows positive values relative to areas involved in production. In 2009, South Korea's flower production accounted for only 0.4% of the total agricultural area, but 2.6% of the total agricultural production value.

Panax ginseng cultivation in South Korea has been on the rise since 1997. In 2009, 19,702 hectares of panax ginseng were planted with a production of 27,460 tonnes, 2.7 times more than in 1996.

=== Animal products ===
==== General ====
From 1990 to 2009, per capita meat consumption in South Korea grew at an annual rate of 3.3%. In the same period, meat production grew by 2.6% annually. The gap between supply and demand has led to an increase in meat imports.

The value of meat production in South Korea rose from 3.9516 trillion won in 1990 to 16.484 trillion won in 2009. Its share of agricultural production in the same period rose from 25.3 percent to 39.9 percent. Since 2005, the value of animal husbandry in South Korea has begun to exceed that of rice. In 2009, the shares of livestock products in total agricultural production in South Korea were: 33.2% for pork, 24.8% for beef, 12.3% for chicken, 10.5% for milk and 8.2% for eggs.

==== Beef ====
Before the Asian financial crisis, the South Korean beef cattle population had been increasing, reaching approximately 2.8 million head of cattle in 1996. As a result of the financial crisis and the full liberalization of South Korean beef imports under the Uruguay Round negotiations, the number of beef cattle decreased to approximately 1.4 million head of cattle in 2001. After that, the number of beef cattle began to rise gradually as demand also rose. To meet the challenges of World Trade Organisation accession, the South Korean government sought to expand the size and number of specialist cattle farms. The number of specialist cattle farms with 50 or more head of beef cattle increased from 956 in 1990 to 11,148 in 2009. In the same period, the number of beef cattle increased from 88,505 to 696,139. There was at the same time a parallel development whereby the number of small farms with 10 or fewer head of cattle declined significantly. The average number of beef cattle kept on farms increased from 2.6 in 1990 to 10.6 in 2009.

With the rise in national income, annual per capita beef consumption in South Korea increased from 4.1 kg in 1990 to 8.1 kg in 2003. The beef self-sufficiency rate, which was above 50 percent until 2000, fell to 42.8 percent in 2001. It fell further to 36.2 percent in 2003. Due to the outbreak of bovine spongiform encephalopathy (BSE) in the United States in December 2003, beef consumption in South Korea began to decline. In 2005, per capita annual beef consumption dropped to 6.6 kg. In 2009, per capita annual beef consumption slowly recovered to 8.1 kg. South Korea's beef self-sufficiency rate returned to 50% in 2009.

BSE had a significant impact on the import mix of South Korean beef. Prior to the outbreak of BSE, South Korea imported more than 60% of its beef from the US. In 2009, beef imports from Australia accounted for 59.0 percent of South Korea's total beef imports, while the share of US beef imports dropped to 25.3 percent.

==== Milk ====
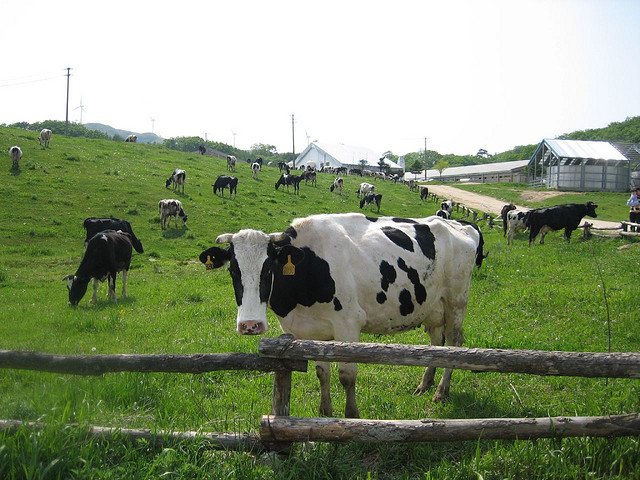
Cattle grazing in May 2007 on high land (800 metres above sea level) in the eastern mountainous area of South Korea at Daegwallyeong

Looking at the dairy industry as a whole, the number of dairy farms and cows in South Korea is on a downward trend. However, milk production has continued to grow due to an increase in milk produced per cow. From 1990 to 2009, the number of specialised dairy herds with more than 50 cows increased from 659 to 44,068. In the same period, the number of cows increased from 57,455 to 366,114. The percentage of specialised dairy farms in the total number of farms increased from 2.0% in 1990 to 65.1% in 2009. In the same period, the percentage number of cows they kept compared to total cow numbers increased from 11.4% to 82.3%.

South Korea's milk consumption showed a year-on-year increase until 2002, from 42.8 kg per capita in 1990 to 64.2 kg per year in 2002. In 2003, dairy products began to increase, especially for cheese, powdered milk, frozen milk and butter. South Korea's milk self-sufficiency rate fell from 90.1 percent in 1995 to 69.5 percent in 2009. Self-sufficiency in milk continued a steady downwards trend from 2014 such that by 2021 the self-sufficiency rate was 45.7%.

==== Pork ====
There has been a general move towards specialised pig farms. The contribution of pork production value to South Korea's overall animal husbandry has remained at around 30%. After 2000, the number of small pig farms gradually decreased due to the spread of chronic pig diseases. Between 1990 and 2009, the percentage of specialised pig farms of total pig farms increased from 0.3% to 39.57%. In the same period, the percentage of pigs raised on such farms out of the total number of pigs increased from 23.3% to 86.5%. As a result, the average number of pigs kept on farms in South Korea in those periods increased from approximately 34 to approximately 1,204.

The annual per capita consumption of pork has been increasing year on year, from 11.8 kg in 1990 to 19.1 kg in 2009. By 2022 the annual per capita pork consumption had increased to 28.5 kg. Between 1990 and 2009, South Korea's pork self-sufficiency rate fell from 99.5% to 78.9% in 2009. By July 1997, South Korea began to fully liberalize pork imports. At the same time, South Korea exported pork to countries such as Japan, the Philippines, Russia and Mongolia.

==== Chicken and eggs ====
The chicken industry is the industry with the most mergers and acquisitions of all of South Korea's livestock industries, with the concentration of the chicken industry increasing between 1989 and 2006 from 15% to 80% . The value of the industry at the end of the period was 2.0229 trillion won. It accounted for 12.3% of South Korea's livestock industry, and the self-sufficiency rate of South Korea in broilers was 87.0%.

Between 1990 and 2009, the percentage of specialised farms with more than 10,000 hens out of all farms producing chickens increased from 26.7% to 80.0 percent. The overall percentage of hens kept by these specialised farms as compared to all farms producing chickens increased during the same period from 73.7% to 96.6%. In that time, the average number of hens kept by farms increased from 10,491 to 37,325. In 2009, South Korea's egg production was 579,276 tonnes, with a self-sufficiency rate of 99.7%.

== Agricultural protection policy ==
Policy goals include the following:

To increase the purchase price of agricultural products by promoting the "balanced price" system (cost + non-agricultural product price changes over the same period).

To improve the circulation conditions of agricultural products and agricultural machinery. A large number of agricultural product trading markets have been established, and agricultural machinery subsidies have been issued to farmers.

To promote the construction of an "agricultural industrial area" plan. In the rural areas of counties and towns with less than 200,000 people, the government will select sites and carry out infrastructure construction to attract "private" capital to set up factories and enterprises, thereby reducing the proportion of local agriculture.

To adjust the rural industrial structure and agricultural structure. The government has invested heavily in adjusting the industrial structure, focusing on the development of secondary and tertiary industries, guiding scientific farming, supporting deep processing of agricultural products, and improving agricultural product circulation facilities.

To improve infrastructure. The South Korean government has adopted measures such as supporting the development of agricultural associations, increasing agricultural loans, and restricting the import of foreign agricultural products to protect and support the development of the country's agriculture.

== Production statistics and trends ==
Volumes of agricultural output for South Korea in 2018 were as follows. Measured by millions of tons, the principal products were: rice (15th largest producer in the world), 5.1; vegetables, 3.3; cabbage (4th largest producer in the world after China, India and Russia) 2.5; onions (13th largest producer in the world) 1.5.

Measured by thousands of tons, other agricultural products in 2018 were: tangerines, 646; potatoes, 553; watermelons, 534; apples, 475; persimmon (3rd largest producer in the world, behind only China and Spain), 346; tomatoes, 344; cucumber, 333; garlic, 331; pumpkins, 321; sweet potatoes, 314; peppers, 230; strawberries (7th largest producer in the world), 213; peaches, 205; pears, 203; grapes, 177; melons, 167.

In addition there was that year a lesser production of other agricultural items.

The 2023 agricultural area was 1.512 million hectares, a 16 thousand hectare decrease from the previous year (1.1% reduction). The paddy field and upland field areas (764 thousand hectares) were 50.5% of the total.

As at June 2024, approximately 1.75% of GDP derived from agriculture, fisheries and forestry products. The agricultural sector was expected to decline in value due to changes in consumer preferences in choosing more meat and fish as opposed to rice and grains. Over half of the farming population was aged 65 or over, whilst smart farming was a rising contributor (value estimated at around 5.4 trillion won in 2020) to the sector's total value. Sales of organic produce were at an average 25% premium price.

== South Korean agricultural diplomacy ==
=== South Korean soft power diplomacy ===
From at least 2016, adaptations of Western "middle power" concepts have been criticised as not working well for Korea as opposed to a suggested "soft power" diplomacy whereby South Korea exercise its resources to present constructive and creative foreign policy options. Prior to that time, the perception of South Korea as a major cultural influence was so unsatisfactory that the National Image Committee in charge of top-down promotion of South Korean culture was disbanded in 2008. With the success of the Korean Wave (Hallyu), government cultural support switched away from primarily top-down activity to work more with private organisations from 2003 with the Korea Foundation for Cultural Industries Exchange (KOFICE). Cultural diplomacy has come to mean cultural display and exchange as part of a wider approach to influence. The Chinese Belt and Road Initiative includes South Korea, whose influence in and support for Africa in particular is furthered by Korea's K-Ricebelt Project.

The G7 meeting in Hiroshima, Japan, in May 2023, saw South Korea promise to expand its support for nations in food crisis, which it did. Including the K-Ricebelt Initiative, the 2024 South Korean budget for Overseas Development Aid is $5.3 billion. This is will place South Korea in the top ten most generous donors in the world.

=== K-Ricebelt Project ===
President Yoon Suk Yeol's 2023 K-Ricebelt initiative was expressly created because when South Korea needed outside help, others helped. Now South Korea has the resources and goodwill to help others in need. The K-Ricebelt Project is for South Korea to help African nations to cut their dependence (currently 40% of total requirement) on expensive imported rice and instead grow more and better for themselves. The South Korean government as at July 2023 had a spending target for this project of 100 billion won (77 million US dollars, 2023 values) over 4 years with the aim of delivering 10,000 tonnes of rice seeds annually. These will be specially developed high-productivity seeds (triple or quadruple productive) adapted to the particular African climate conditions, and to be grown at new Korean-built facilities in the relevant countries. The first eight countries to join the scheme were: Cameroon, Gambia, Ghana, Guinea, Guinea-Bissau, Kenya, Senegal and Uganda. As part of the project, the South Korean government will supply machinery, and share know-how and technology. The aim is to assist small farmers. On 16 October 2023 Sierra Leone became the ninth African country to join the initiative by concluding a Memorandum of Understanding with South Korea. On 23 October 2023 a partnership with the Ivory Coast was announced as part of the K-Ricebelt project. The new rice types were a cross-breed of high-yielding Korean varieties with African local varieties and were developed in a research facility in Senegal. The high-yield rice can in the right conditions be cropped twice a year. Successful hybrids initially available were ISRIZ-6, ISRIZ-7 and ISRIZ-8. In March 2024 it was reported that the initiative had exceeded its initial targets by 14% because 6 African countries were able to harvest 2,321 tons of rice seeds.

The activities of the Kerala government in providing Sabari K-Rice, branded "K-Rice," are not connected to the Korean initiative.

=== AGRI-Ukraine assistance ===
In September 2023 South Korea committed to provision of 5 million US dollars' worth of fertiliser to assist agriculture in Ukraine. The delivery is planned in cooperation with the U.S. Agency for International Development (USAID).

=== Green Digital Economy platform (GDEP) ===
GDEP is a digital platform agreed to be created whereby farmers in Indonesia can participate in access to agricultural and carbon-trading information. The platform is the joint initiative of South Korea and Indonesian governments. It aimed from September 2023 onwards to run a pilot scheme for 10 million Indonesian farmers to access the platform and benefit from AI. Skills training is part of the project, which is expected to generate 1 billion US dollars investment in the platform. The ultimate users will be 62 million small farmers in Indonesia.

== See also ==
- Aquaculture in South Korea
- Fishing industry in South Korea
- Geography of South Korea
- Korea Forest Service
- Ministry of Agriculture, Food and Rural Affairs (South Korea)
- New Community Movement
