= Aquaculture in South Korea =

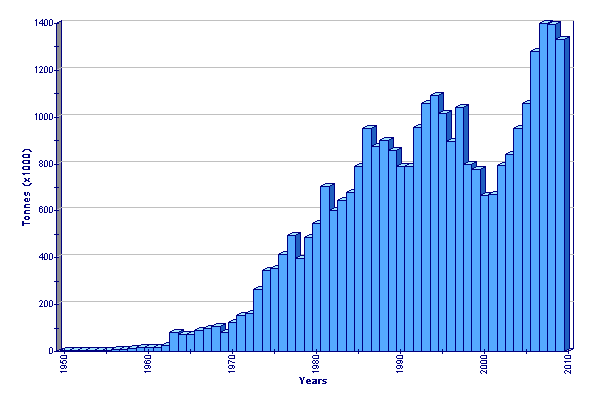
Global Aquaculture Production in South Korea

South Korea is a major center of aquaculture production, and the world's third largest producer of farmed algae as of 2020.

South Korea occupies the southern portion of the Korean peninsula. The total land mass of the country is 98,480 km^{2} but only 20% consists of arable land and thus the population is concentrated around the coast. The Korean Peninsula is surrounded by the East, West and South Seas, a coastline that extends for about 2,413 km. Endowed with an abundance of fisheries resources, Koreans have developed a distinct seafood culture with annual per capita seafood consumption of 48.1 kg in 2005.

Years of capturing wild fish combined with improved fishing technology have led to a continuous decrease in capture production in South Korea in recent years, and consequently led to a greater attention to aquaculture to meet the increasing demand for aquatic products.

Extensive aquaculture has been practiced in Korea for several hundred years, with seaweed farming beginning in the 1600s, but modern intensive aquaculture (mainly for seaweed and shellfish) did not emerge until the 1960s. However, total annual aquaculture production was less than 100,000 tonnes in this period. Aquaculture production increased from 147,000 tonnes in 1971, to over 1.2 million tonnes in 2006, and 2.3 million tonnes by 2017.

== Cultured species ==
Current aquaculture production in South Korea is dominated by seaweeds, followed by molluscs and finfish.

Fishery products	Tonnes (2008)	Percentage (2008)	Percentage (2017)
Seaweed	764 913	60.7	76
Shellfish	391 060	31.1	18
Finfish	91 123	7.2	4
Others	12 128	0.9	2
Total	1 259 274	100	100

Aquaculture in the sea has developed differently due to the variation of three different coastal regions.

- East Coast - Because of simple coastline and strong wave action, there are only land-based cultures near the coast. Flatfish (Paralichthys olivaceus) and scallop (Patinopecten yessoensis) are the main species cultured on the east coast of South Korea.
- South Coast - There are a number of semi-enclosed bays, islands and estuaries with moderate tidal ranges. An archipelagic environment makes it an ideal place for installation of cages. Aquaculture production on the south coast is much higher than on the east or west coast. The southwest is dominated by seaweed farms, while the southeast is mostly given over to shellfish.
- West Coast - Warm (up to 26 °C) estuarine environment with a high tidal range and well developed tidal flats enables crustacean and shellfish production in this region. Trials for the use of earthen ponds for finfish have been successful.

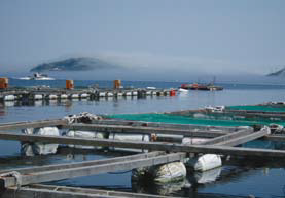
Cage farms for finfish production near the coast

=== Seaweed ===
Most aquaculture in South Korea consists of seaweed farming. In 2005, 55% of aquaculture production in South Korea consisted of seaweed. By 2017, that had increased to 76% of all aquaculture production, totaling 1,761,526 tonnes. Seaweed culture is mainly concentrated on the southwest coast, where almost 90% of South Korean seaweed cultivation takes place. Cultured seaweed species include sea mustard (Caulerpa sp.), gim (Porphyra and Pyropia spp.), kelp (Laminaria spp.), hijiki (Hizikia fusiformis), green laver (Monostroma sp.), daisima (Saccharina japonica), and codium (Codium sp.). The brown seaweed Undaria dominates algal aquaculture production, constituting 42% of the total wet weight. Gim, however, is the most valuable, making up 71% of the total seaweed production value. The production was estimated to be 217,559 tonnes in 2008 (wet weight) which is equivalent to more than 10 billion sheets of dried gim, making South Korea the world's largest exporter of gim.

South Korea was a pioneer of selective seaweed breeding, with government-supported research beginning in the 1980s and continuing to the present day. Winter harvesting of seaweed takes place and the process of preparation involves repeatedly wetting and drying the seaweed. Jeonnam Province produced in 2023 approximately 78% of South Korean seaweed. In an endeavour to improve the international export price for South Korean seaweed, new systems of quality control and management were announced as being introduced in the province. South Korean seaweed was at the time sold for well under half the price of its Japanese equivalent. Sinan Bada Fishery Corporation operating on the Western Coast of Korea in Shinan County obtained in 2024 the first designation world-wide of sustainable seaweed certified both by the Marine Stewardship Council and the Aquaculture Stewardship Council.

=== Shellfish ===
Molluscs are the second-most important group of marine aquaculture products. The primary species produced, including the oysters (Crassostrea gigas and Pinctada fucata), Korean mussel (Mytilus coruscus ), the sea squirt red oyas (Halocynthia roretzi), the Japanese carpet shell (Ruditapes philippinarum ), ark shells (Anadara satowi and A. broughtonii), cockles (A. granosabisenensis and A. subcrenata), Yesso scallop (Patinopecten yessoensis) and abalone (Haliotis discus hannai). Production of molluscs reached 391,060 tonnes in 2006, making up 31.1% of the total aquaculture production of South Korea.

Oysters are considered to be the most important molluscan shellfish in the aquaculture industry of South Korea, which, in 2005, produced 251,706 tonnes of oysters. Approximately 90% of the Korean oysters come from farms located in small bays and off islands along the southern coast. Oyster farming is highly popular, as it produces high profits. For example, in 2003, one oyster farming family worked on 126 oyster long-lines producing a net profit of 33,000 US dollars.

=== Finfish ===
Marine finfish culture is dominated by bastard halibut (Paralichthys olivaceus), Korean rockfish (Sebastes schlegeli), mullet, seabass, yellowtail, red seabream, black seabream, brown croaker and puffers.

Finfish are the most important species in freshwater aquaculture; species in this group include trout, mud fish (Clarias sp.), Japanese eel (Anguilla japonica), tilapia, common carp, loach, colored carp, snakehead (Channa sp.), sweet fish, Korean bullhead (Pelteobagrus fulvidraco), goldfish and mountain trout.

=== Crustacean ===
Crustacean culture is primarily concerned with two species of shrimp and some crabs. Fleshy prawn (Fenneropenaeus chinensis) and kuruma prawn (Marsupenaeus japonicus) are the prime species of shrimp being farmed with the former raised mostly in farms along the west of the peninsula and the latter in farms in the southern region.

== Trends and development 1990s-2000s ==
There have been deliberate efforts to shift from the production of low value aquaculture species such as seaweeds to high value species like finfish in South Korea. The government has been pursuing a long-term aquaculture development programme through the expansion of areas for aquaculture and the intensified development of both profitable and unexploited species. Already certain tidal areas in the southern provinces have been designated for shellfish culture. Korea planned to reduce by 10% production facilities devoted to products such as laver and sea-mustard, with no new licences to be issued between 2000 and 2005. Another reason for the slow down in growth is the loss of some aquaculture areas to industrial pollution, such as the case with oysters, due to the reclamation works and construction of industrial complexes in coastal districts.

The Ministry of Oceans and Fisheries encouraged the industry to reduce production costs so that it can compete with foreign counterparts. Between the period of 1997 and 2003, aquaculture production of aquatic plants dropped by 30% and mussels by 75%. On the other hand, olive flounder and black rockfish production increased by 78%. There was also an increased interest in farming of shrimps (P. chinensis and P. japonicus) and the mitten-handed crabs, previously only cultured in China. As a result, crustacean production has increased by 48% between 1997 and 2003.

In 2006, the integrated aquaculture management created an alternate plan to overcome problems such as harmful algal blooms, typhoons, and pollution created by human activities. In this plan, the scope of 'aquaculture ground' extends to open areas. It is divided into three subdivisions; land-based aquaculture, integrated multi-trophic aquaculture, and offshore aquaculture.

== Current and future directions ==
Despite increases in finfish production, Korean aquaculture is still dominated by seaweeds. There was an rise in production of high value fish species, such as olive flounder and black rockfish beginning in the 1990s and a new interest in culturing penaeid shrimp, but the increase slowed and even reversed by the mid-2010s. As of 2021, the major issues facing Korean aquaculture are eutrophication, disease, rising sea temperatures, and ocean acidification.

=== Eutrophication and disease ===
The increase in finfish aquaculture from the 1990s to the 2000s coincided with an rise in the incidence of harmful algal blooms in southeast Korea. Excess nutrients from finfish feces and uneaten feed probably bear some of the blame, especially as Korean finfish cages are often located far from nutrient sinks like seaweed or sea cucumber farms.

Excess nutrients can act as a reservoir for diseases and parasites as well. Sicknesses like red rot disease in Pyropia, Vibrio in shellfish, and parasites in fish are a major research subject in Korea due to their ability to ruin production. The Korean government began a project funding selective breeding of seaweeds for disease resistance and growth rate in the mid-2010s, referred to as Golden Seed.

A possible solution would be to shift to IMTA. While it is not widely practiced in Korea as yet, the first Korean IMTA farm opened in 2012 with black rockfish as the main species, and Pacific oyster, sea cucumbers, and two seaweeds as nutrient removers. It was successful in matching or increasing organism growth when compared to monocultures.

=== Climate change ===
Korean sea temperatures are predicted to rise by several degrees by 2100, with temperature-sensitive species such as gim and Korean rockfish suffering the worst. Overall, seaweeds and sea squirts are the most vulnerable to changing temperature and salinity. Already, a heatwave in 2016 raised sea temperatures by over 2 degrees, resulting in the loss of over 60 million cultured organisms and leaving many others more vulnerable to disease. Ocean acidification is linked to the deaths of bivalves, particularly littleneck clams, through degradation of their shells. Because the east and west coast of the country are predicted to warm faster than the south, however, it is unlikely that farms will be able to move production northwards to escape the effects of climate change.

=== Export trade ===
Dried seaweed ("gim") is a major export commodity of South Korea. In 2023 the period January to October saw exports rise by over 20% on the previous year to US $670 million. These exports in 2023 were made to 124 countries, and the year-end total exports were US $763 million.

== See also ==
- Geography of South Korea
- Fishing industry in South Korea
- Agriculture in South Korea
