= National Institute of Fisheries Science =

Scientific body in South Korea

Coordinates: 35.1911966°N 129.2228566°E

- Hangul: 국립수산과학원
- Hanja: 國立水産科學院
- RR: Gungnip susan gwahagwon
- MR: Kungnip susan kwahagwŏn

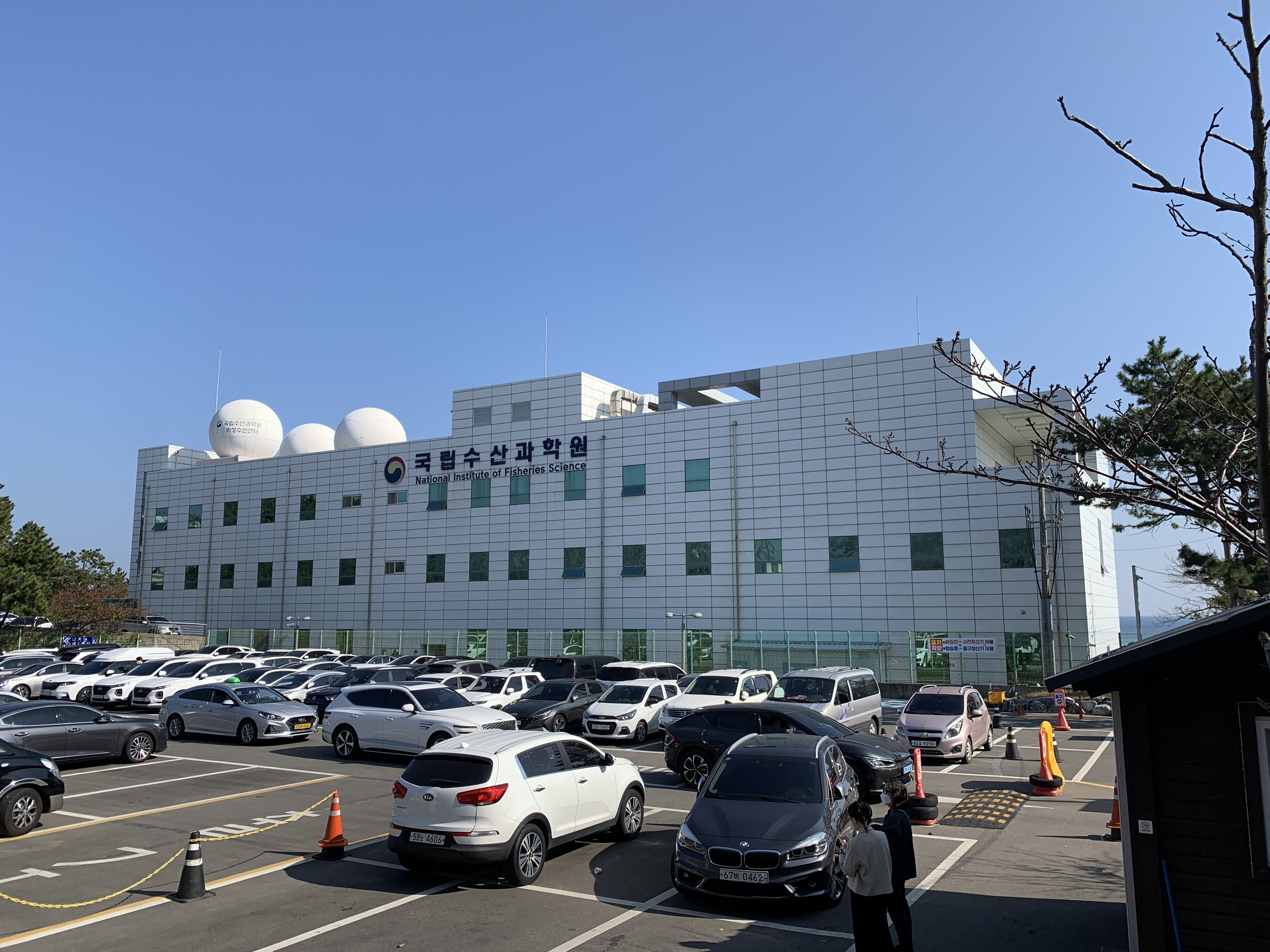
Headquarters

The National Institute of Fisheries Science (NIFS), previous called the National Fisheries Research and Development Institute (NFRDI), is a scientific body operated by the South Korean government, under the authority of the Ministry for Food, Agriculture, Forestry and Fisheries. It was established in 1921. Subsidiary institutes operate in each of the major Korean fisheries.

The NFRDI is headquartered in Gijang-eup, Gijang-gun, northern Busan.

== See also ==
- Fishing industry of South Korea
- Fisheries management
