= Korea Institute of Maritime and Fisheries Technology =

South Korean research institute

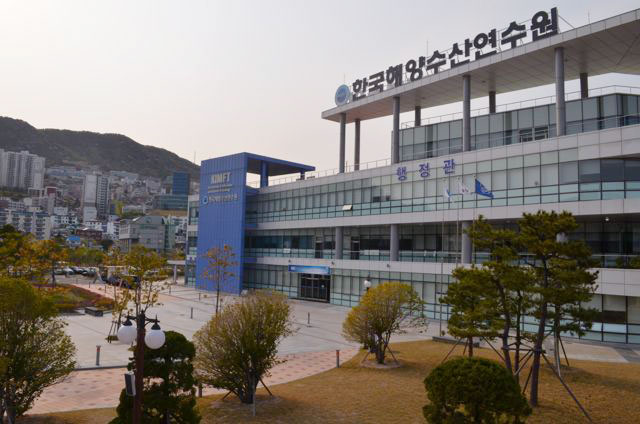
- KIMFT head office, Busan, 2013

Korean name
- Hangul: 한국해양수산연수원
- Hanja: 韓國海洋水産硏修院
- RR: Hanguk haeyang susan yeonsuwon
- MR: Han'guk haeyang susan yŏnsuwŏn

The Korea Institute of Maritime and Fisheries Technology, or KIMFT, is a maritime education and research institute operated by the government of South Korea. It is based in Yeongdang-dong, Nam-gu, Busan, with an auxiliary campus on Yeongdo island near Busan Port. Each campus includes a dormitory for trainees.

The Institute was formed in 1998 from the merger of the Korea Fishing Training Center with the Korea Maritime Training and Research Institute. The first was established in 1965 as the Korea Deep-sea Training Institute. In 1978, it became an independent corporation. The research institute was founded in 1983, attached to Korea Maritime and Ocean University. The two were merged by an act of the National Assembly of South Korea passed in 1997.

In addition to its research work, KIMFT offers a range of professional certifications. These include a certification in fish medicine.

== See also ==
- Fishing industry of South Korea
- Government of South Korea
- Education in South Korea
