= Korea Maritime Institute =

South Korean research institute

- Hangul: 한국해양수산개발원
- Hanja: 韓國海洋水産開發院
- RR: Hanguk haeyang susan gaebarwon
- MR: Han'guk haeyang susan kaebarwŏn

The Korea Maritime Institute (KMI) is a think tank and research center developing South Korean policies on marine affairs and fisheries, operated by the South Korean government through the Office of Government Policy Coordination. KMI was established under its current name in 1997, though expanded from a research center created in 1984 specializing in shipping economics.

KMI is organized into five research divisions as of 2011:

- Marine & Coastal Policy Research Department
- Shipping, Port & Logistics Research Department
- Fisheries Policy Research Department
- Marine Territory and Industry Research Department
- Fisheries Outlook Center

and has two overseas centers:

- Shanghai Research Center
- Korea-US Marine Policy Joint Research Center, at the University of Rhode Island

KMI is headquartered in Mapo-gu, Seoul, having a staff of about 180.

The institute is an active member of the University of the Arctic. UArctic is an international cooperative network based in the Circumpolar Arctic region, consisting of more than 200 universities, colleges, and other organizations with an interest in promoting education and research in the Arctic region.

== See also ==
- Fishing industry of South Korea
