= List of countries by food self-sufficiency rate =

== List by Food and Agriculture Organization ==
Countries with highest caloric self-sufficiency ratio in 2010
Rank	Country	Ratio (%)
1	Argentina	273
2	Uruguay	232
3	Australia	207
4	Ukraine	193
5	New Zealand	185
6	Canada	183
7	Bulgaria	171
8	Hungary	162
9	Lithuania	149
10	Malaysia	145

== List by Japan's Ministry of Agriculture, Forestry and Fisheries ==
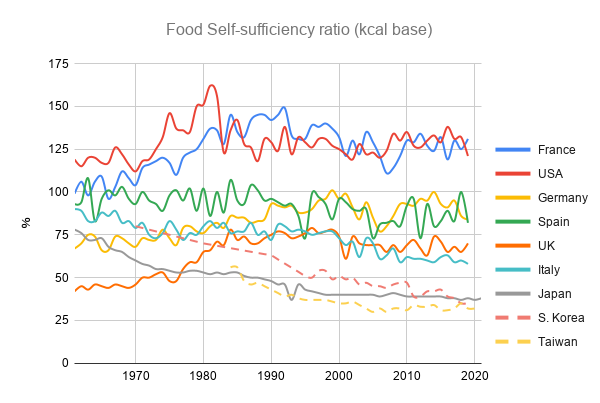
Graph of food self-sufficiency rates

This is a 2010 list of major countries by food self-sufficiency rates on a calorie supply basis.

Ranking	Country	Rate (%)	Year
1	Australia	173	2007
2	United States	124	2007
3	France	111	2007
4	Germany	80	2007
5	United Kingdom	65	2007
6	Italy	63	2007
7	Switzerland	54	2007
8	South Korea	44	2007
9	Japan	40	2009

== See also ==
- Self-sustainability
- Food security
