= Pablo (tanker) =

History

Gabon
- Name: Pablo
- Launched: 1997
- In service: 1997
- Identification: IMO number: 9133587; MMSI number: 626270000; Callsign: TRAR9
- Status: In service

General characteristics
- Type: Aframax tanker
- Length: 232 m (761 ft 2 in)
- Capacity: Crude oil 700,000 bbl (110,000,000 L; 29,000,000 US gal)

Pablo was a crude oil tanker. The tanker was built in 1997 and currently registered in Gabon. The ownership of the ship remains unclear. The tanker is part of the Iranian and Russian Ghost Fleets.

After a devastating accident in May 2024, the owners went into hiding and months later the Malaysian authorities scrapped the wreck.

== Ship ==
Pablo was built in 1997 and is an Aframax tanker of 232 metres (761 ft 2 in) length. The tanker has a capacity of 700,000 barrels (110,000 m^{3}).

== Ownership ==
The ship had various owners. The ship was sold to an undisclosed buyer for demolition. However, a few days later, the deal quietly fell through, and the vessel began operating in the shadows of Iranian and Russian ghost fleets. The ship's registered owner, Pablo Union Shipping, is a shell company that cannot be traced.

After the 2024 incident the vessel's insurance is listed as "withdrawn" on most shipping websites.

== History ==
Pablo allegedly has a record of carrying sanctioned Iranian crude oil, and had probably just delivered Russian oil to a Chinese refinery. Pablo has been transporting fuel oil from Iran for a long period. The ship is also featured on a list of ships under investigation for sanctions-busting by the organization United Against Nuclear Iran.

The ship was first named Olympic Spirit II, then Mockingbird, Helios, Adisa, and then a handful of other names. It was rechristened Pablo in recent years. Already past its prime, the ship was sold to an undisclosed buyer for demolition. But a few days later, the deal quietly fell through, and the vessel began operating in the shadows.

A shipment in March 2024 most probably came from Russia, according to Kpler, via several transshipments on the high seas: First in the Strait of Gibraltar, south of Spain, then near Malaysia from the vessel Ocean Hermana. On first of May 2024 an explosion happened aboard Pablo. The explosion took place off the coast of Malaysia, in one of the busiest shipping channels in the world, but beyond the congested waters of Singapore. According to data from Kpler, a firm specializing in maritime data analysis, the ship was carrying a highly polluting heavy fuel oil used for electricity generation or fuel, especially in Asia. The vessel was traversing the South China Sea after unloading crude oil in China and was nearly empty. Out of the 28 crew members on board, officials report that 25 were rescued by passing vessels. Two Indians and one Ukrainian were not found. Pablo was reportedly heading for Singapore.

The tanker was abandoned than for at least 128 days, untended, at anchor at the place of the incident.

After seven months, Malaysian authorities finally decided to remove the wreck of Pablo and bring it to a ship scrapping facility to the west of Jakarta.

== AIS manipulation ==
Despite being broken up on 1 May 2024, Pablo's signals were first broadcast from the Russian port of Novorossiysk between 22 and 30 March 2024.
