= Ship-to-ship =

Ship-to-ship may refer to:

- Ship-to-ship cargo transfer
- Ship-to-ship radiotelephony
- Type 90 Ship-to-Ship Missile
