= Foreign trade of Iran =

Iran as of 2020 has a $478.1 billion economy. Major companies or sectors, including the Iranian oil industry are controlled or partially controlled by the Iranian Islamic revolutionary Guard corps. According to official data Iran's major trade patterns are the People's Republic of China accounting for about 30% of trade, followed by Turkey (9.0%), the United Arab Emirates (7.3%), and Afghanistan (2.7%). 34.6% of Iranian exports are to China, consisting mainly of oil, in violation of international sanctions, its second, third and fourth largest export partners are Turkey, India and Pakistan respectively. 34.4% of Iranian imports are from China, followed by the UAE at 19.8% and Turkey at 10.5%.

The Times reported that Iranian oil accounts for 15% of China's demand, which would roughly equate to 90% of Iran's total exports.

== Major exports ==
Exports of Iran by product category (2019) Chemical products Transportation Machines Mineral products Plastics and rubbers Metals Foodstuffs Precious metals Textiles Instruments Animal products Vegetable products Paper goods Footwear and headwear Miscellaneous Stone and glass Wood products Animal and vegetable bi-products Animal hides Arts and antiques Weapons

=== Oil and other hydrocarbons ===
China buys 15% of its oil from Iran. Chinese demand has resurrected the Iranian oil industry to the level it was prior to the 2018 American sanctions by US President Donald Trump. In order to transport the oil despite Western sanctions the Iranians and Chinese use a 400 ship "ghost armada". Had this fleet not been able to operate, Iran would have lost $100 billion in revenue between 2020 and 2024 according to interviewee in the Times article. In order to evade detection, the ghost fleet uses deceptive techniques including transferring oil between ships in the open sea, changing flags under which they sail, masquerading and forging cargo documents.

The ghost fleet has caused multiple oil spills according to Samir Madani. Madani also said spills, usually in the Middle East or Southeastern Asia, were growing common and were at times unnoticed. "The dark fleet activity posed a “huge threat” to marine and human health" due to inpurities in the Iranian oil. Cancer and irritations are among several health consequences of such health spills.

Upon arrival in China, the Iranian oil is rebranded as Malaysian or Middle Eastern crude and sold to independent refineries known as "teapots." These refineries reportedly pay Iran in renminbi through smaller, US-sanctioned banks like the Bank of Kunlun, shielding China's major financial institutions from the risk of US sanctions.

According to the Atlantic Council, Iran primarily utilizes renminbi received from oil exports to China by purchasing Chinese goods or holding reserves in Chinese banks. Due to the currency's limited global acceptance and restricted convertibility, Iran does not widely use the currency outside China. The renminbi's role in international trade has expanded in recent years, though primarily within China's trade partnerships. In 2022, Iran imported $2.12 billion worth of machinery and $1.43 billion worth of electronics from China, with these transactions likely conducted in renminbi. However, detailed financial data on trade settlements between the two countries remain unavailable.

The Atlantic council also suggested Iran may be accumulating renminbi as part of its foreign exchange reserves. In October 2023, an official from the Central Bank of Iran reported an increase in the country's reserves, attributed to growing oil and non-oil exports. Around 90% of Iran's oil exports are directed to China, a significant portion of its reserves may be denominated in renminbi. The council said that Iran's efforts to reduce dependence on the United States dollar align with China's broader strategy to internationalize its currency.

Natural gas

Iran is the world's 4th largest producer of natural gas and has the world's second largest natural gas reserves after Russia. 260 billion cubic metres of gas is produced by Iran. China is the largest importer of Iranian natural gas, importing 70,000 barrels of mazut, followed by the United Arab Emirates, importing 60,000 barrels.

Iran has forecasted it will export 16 billion cubic meters at a value of $5.2 billion in 2024.

Iran sued Pakistan for delaying importation of natural gas from Iran. Pakistan said US sanctions caused it to have concerns regarding the importation of gas from Iran.

=== Military ===
==== UAVs ====
Iran has exports unmanned aerial vehicles (UAVs), with reports indicating that it has supplied Mohajer-6 drones to the Sudanese Armed Forces amid the ongoing Sudanese civil war. This development aligns with Iran's broader strategy of increasing arms sales to various global actors, including Ethiopia, Bolivia, Venezuela, and the Polisario Front. The sell price of a Shahed-136 drone was estimated at $20,000–$40,000.

Iran has exported UAVs to Russia which were then used by it in its war against Ukraine. According to Reuters, Iran supplied Russia with hundreds of drones with which it made use against Ukraine. Iranian drones were transported to Russia via civilian airlines and boats. The Ukrainian capital, Kyiv was hit by Iranian Shahed 136 drones.

== Imports ==
=== Military ===
North Korea had historically supplied Tehran with ballistic missile technology and conventional weapons. A 2024 visit of a North Korean delegation to Iran has heightened concerns in Washington and Brussels about potential cooperation on missile and nuclear technology according to Radio Free Europe. Reports in RFE article suggested North Korean weapons have appeared in the hands of Iranian proxies, while Iran's experience with air-defense systems and drone production may be of interest to Pyongyang. According to Scollon, North Korea, which supplies munitions to Russia, may be deepening its ties with Iran regarding military trade.

== See also ==
- China–Iran trade relations
