= China–Iran trade relations =

China–Iran trade relations have expanded in recent years, driven by economic, energy, and strategic cooperation. As Iran's largest trading partner, China conducts billions of dollars in bilateral trade annually, primarily through Iranian oil exports and Chinese manufactured goods. Despite international sanctions, China has sustained economic engagement with Iran, often employing alternative financial mechanisms to bypass restrictions. Chinese investments span multiple sectors, including infrastructure, transportation, energy, and defense, and also Iran's nuclear program.

== Modern time history ==
During the Cold War era, Iran and China maintained informal trade ties, which gradually expanded. By the 1980s, their trade volume had reached $1.63 billion, growing to $15 billion by 2007. In 2001, trade between the two nations stood at $3.3 billion, increasing to $9.2 billion by 2005.

By 2005, China supplied 8.3% of Iran's total imports, ranking as the second-largest exporter after Germany. Between 2000 and 2005, Iran's imports from China surged by 360%, with China accounting for 9.5% of Iran's total imports. According to Middle East Policy this rapid expansion was attributed to China's economic restructuring in 1988, which facilitated a greater influx of Chinese products into Iranian markets.

== Chinese investments in Iran ==
China invested heavily in key infrastructure projects in Iran. Chinese firms were involved in Tehran's subway system, dam construction, fisheries, and cement factories. Meanwhile, Iran supplied China with essential minerals, including coal, zinc, lead, and copper. Trade also expanded into power generation, mining, transportation equipment, arms, electronics, auto parts, and consumer goods, with Chinese-manufactured products and vehicles becoming increasingly prevalent in Iran.

The original plan for the Iran–China 25-year Cooperation Program proposed by General Secretary of the Chinese Communist Party Xi Jinping during a 2016 visit to Iran.

== Growth of bilateral trade ==
By 2011, Iran-China trade had reached $45 billion. In January 2023, Amir Moghaddam, head of the Chabahar Free Zone Organization, announced the launch of the first direct shipping route from China to Iran. Previously, Chinese cargo was shipped to Bandar Abbas and then transported via smaller vessels to Chabahar. The new direct route reduced shipping times by 10 days and lowered loading and unloading costs by $400 per container.

By 2023, Iran's exports to China totaled $4.59 billion, primarily consisting of:

- Ore, slag, and ash (29.5%),
- Plastics and steel/iron products (27.5%),
- Organic chemicals (15.9%).

Meanwhile, China's exports to Iran reached $10 billion, with the main categories being:

- Machinery, mechanical appliances, and parts (22.4%),
- Electrical machinery and electronics (15.5%),
- Automobiles, tractors, and trucks (24.9%).

== Trade amid the international sanctions ==
China has played a key role in helping Iran circumvent international sanctions, particularly through complex networks that facilitate the importation of Iranian oil.

=== Mechanisms of evasion ===
==== Teapot refineries ====
Sino-Iranian evasion from sanctions is conducted in part through small, semi-independent Chinese refineries known as "teapots." These refineries account for nearly 90% of Iran's oil exports, as larger state-owned enterprises have scaled back transactions with Iran due to fears of secondary sanctions. Teapot refineries acquire Iranian crude oil at significant discounts and often rebrand it as originating from other countries, such as Malaysia or the United Arab Emirates (UAE), to obscure its true origin. This strategy helps shield major Chinese firms from potential sanctions and scrutiny by Western authorities.

==== Dark fleet tankers ====
Iran's sanctions evasion strategy includes "dark fleet" tankers, which operate without transponders to avoid detection. These vessels transport Iranian oil directly to China, where payments are typically made in renminbi through smaller banks that attract less international scrutiny by Western enforcement.

=== Economic impact ===
The deepening financial ties between China and Iran have helped sustain Iran's economy despite intensified U.S. sanctions. Reports collected by the Atlantic Council indicate that approximately 91% of Iran's oil exports now flow to China. The alternative market created by China for sanctioned oil allows both nations to continue trading despite restrictions, thereby diminishing the intended impact of international sanctions.

=== Recent developments ===
Tracking data suggests that Chinese ports, such as Dongying, have become key hubs for receiving sanctioned oil from both Iran and Russia. U.S. lawmakers have raised concerns over Chinese state-owned enterprises allegedly assisting Iran's energy sector.

== Iran, China and the Iranian arms industry ==
=== Historical support ===
==== 1980s–1990s ====
During this period, China was a major supplier of arms to Iran, providing Soviet-sourced or reverse-engineered weapons, including tanks, missiles, fighter aircraft, and naval vessels. Additionally, China assisted in the establishment of local production facilities for cruise missiles, artillery, and other defense systems. China also contributed to Iran's nuclear, chemical, and missile programs by transferring critical technologies and scientific expertise.

==== Missile development ====
According to Bates China played a crucial role in Iran's development of indigenous missile production capabilities. Notably, Chinese assistance included modifications to missile systems such as the HY-2 Silkworm, as well as the transfer of blueprints, dual-use technologies, and technical expertise.

=== Decline in arms trade ===
==== Post-2005 shift ====
China ceased signing new arms export agreements with Iran in 2005, aligning with international sanctions and its support for United Nations Security Council resolutions against Iran. While deliveries from pre-existing contracts continued until 2015, no significant arms sales have been reported since then.

==== Iran's shift to domestic production ====
Following China's reduction in arms exports, Iran turned to domestic production and Russian imports to meet its defense needs. Although China remains a potential supplier of strategic materials, its direct role in Iran's conventional weapons inventory has significantly diminished.

=== Recent developments ===
==== Dual-use materials ====
CNN reported that a decline in direct arms sales, China continues to supply Iran with dual-use materials that may support its military programs. For example, recent shipments of sodium perchlorate from China were reportedly used as fuel for Iranian ballistic missiles.

==== Drone components ====
Reports indicate that Chinese-manufactured components have been found in Iranian drones used in conflicts, including the Russia-Ukraine war.

=== Strategic cooperation ===
In 2021, Iran and China signed a 25-year strategic agreement that includes provisions for defense collaboration. While the pact envisions joint ventures in military technology and training, it does not indicate a return to large-scale arms transfers.

== China and the Iranian nuclear program ==
=== Historical cooperation ===
==== 1980s–1990s ====
During this period, China was a key partner in Iran's nuclear development. It assisted in building research reactors, supplied uranium hexafluoride for enrichment, and helped construct facilities such as a uranium enrichment plant near Isfahan. Two nuclear cooperation protocols were signed in 1985 and 1990.

==== Covert agreements ====
In 1990, a covert nuclear agreement between China and Iran was uncovered, followed by a broader nuclear cooperation agreement in 1992. Despite U.S. objections, these agreements continued, raising concerns about potential weapons-related nuclear development.

==== Shift in policy ====
By 1997, under pressure from the United States, China ceased direct nuclear assistance to Iran. This included halting sales of nuclear reactors and enrichment technology. However, reports indicate that indirect support continued through dual-use technologies and expertise transfers.

=== Role in the JCPOA ===
==== Mediation and support ====
China played a significant role in the negotiations leading to the Joint Comprehensive Plan of Action (JCPOA) in 2015 according to Maylafayza. It supported Iran's right to peaceful nuclear enrichment under International Atomic Energy Agency (IAEA) provisions while advocating for a diplomatic resolution.

==== Technical assistance ====
As part of the JCPOA framework, China agreed to assist in modernizing Iran's Arak heavy water reactor. This collaboration according to Maylafayza aimed to reduce the reactor's potential for producing weapons-grade plutonium and ensure its operation remained in line with peaceful nuclear objectives.

=== Current stance ===
==== Support for JCPOA revival ====
Since the US withdrawal from the JCPOA in 2018, China has called for its restoration. It has opposed unilateral sanctions on Iran and called for diplomacy as the primary means of resolving nuclear disputes.

China and Iran are involved in oil for goods trade. However, Masoud Daneshmand, a member of the Iranian Chamber of Commerce, criticized the government's policies on bartering oil for goods, saying that the Chinese gave Iran all the shoddy goods they had in exchange for the oil they took from Iran, causing Iran huge losses, even for years to come. For instance, China supplied Iran bad pesticide that have caused a sharp decline in the exports of some Iranian agricultural products.
