= An Yang 2 =

Ship built in 2010

The An Yang 2 is a Chinese bulk carrier cargo ship built in 2010.

In 2025, the ship ran aground off the coast of Sakhalin, Russia, on 8 February 2025, after it lifted anchor from a temporary near-coastal anchorage, but did so during a heavy storm. The Russian News Agency TASS said the ship was transporting coal, fuel oil, and motor oil and that no spill has been detected. As of 9 February, the ship was located approximately 200 m (0.12 mi) from the coastline, and neither divers nor rescue vessels have been able to approach the vessel due to the storm.

A strong storm was reported to a factor in the vessel running aground. Although 20 crew were on board, the ship did not issue a distress signal. The governor of Sakhalin Valery Limarenkov placed the region on high alert. The grounding resulted in multiple ballast tanks holed, but still no oil leaks reported after two days.

By 10 February, Russian Authorities were preparing to pump out the remaining 700 tons of fuel oil and deploying containment booms to attempt to prevent the spread of any oil spill, but the continuing storm was hampering the effort.

The An Yang 2 has been part of the Russian shadow fleet of hundreds of older ships being used to skirt international sanctions on Russia during the 2022 Russian invasion of Ukraine.

== An Yang 2 description ==
The An Yang 2 is a 190 m-long (620 ft) 56,700 deadweight tonnes (55,800 deadweight tons) bulk carrier that was built in 2010.
