= Iranian shadow fleet =

Secret group of oil tankers and companies

The Iranian shadow fleet is a network of oil tankers, shell companies, and covert logistical operations used by the Islamic Republic of Iran to secretly export oil in defiance of international sanctions, primarily those imposed by the United States. This shadow fleet plays a central role in sustaining Iran's sanctioned economy, particularly in funding the Islamic Revolutionary Guard Corps (IRGC) and its foreign operations.

== Background ==
Following the re-imposition of U.S. sanctions after Washington's 2018 withdrawal from the Joint Comprehensive Plan of Action (JCPOA), Iran turned to covert oil exports to maintain its revenues. With the formal energy sector increasingly isolated from global markets, Iran constructed a clandestine supply chain supported by hundreds of maritime vessels operating under false identities, with manipulated tracking systems and fraudulent documentation.

== Structure and operations ==
The ghost fleet consists of vessels with obscured ownership, often registered under flags of convenience in jurisdictions such as Panama and the Marshall Islands. Many ships operate with automatic identification system (AIS) transponders disabled, engage in ship-to-ship transfers, and employ deceptive shipping practices like falsified bills of lading or misrepresented cargo origins. These practices have enabled Iran to move millions of barrels of crude oil to countries such as China, Syria, and Venezuela, circumventing sanctions enforcement. The most notable area known for this oil transactions is the calm waters near Malaziya, outside its territorial waters, yet still within its exclusive economic zone.

== Modus operandi ==
=== Flag hopping ===
Ships frequently change their country of registration ("flag hopping") to obscure their ownership and avoid detection. This is often done through registries with limited oversight, such as Panama, which currently flags about 17% of the identified ghost fleet vessels.

=== Shell companies and ownership obfuscation ===
The fleet relies on a web of shell and front companies, often registered in jurisdictions like Hong Kong, the UAE, Liberia, and Panama, to mask the true ownership and operation of the vessels.

=== Digital and physical deception ===
Ships may alter their physical markings, change names, and manipulate tracking systems (such as turning off AIS transponders) to avoid detection. Ship-to-ship (STS) transfers are conducted in international waters, especially outside port limits in Southeast Asia, to further obscure the origin and destination of the oil.

=== AIS manipulation ===
Vessels routinely disable or spoof their Automatic identification system (AIS) transponders, making them invisible to global tracking systems or broadcasting false locations.

=== Vessel name changes and repainting ===
Tankers are frequently renamed and repainted, further frustrating efforts to link them to Iranian interests.

=== Ship-to-Ship (STS) transfers ===
Oil is often transferred between ships in international waters, especially near the Gulf of Oman, off Iraq, and near the UAE, to obscure the origin of the cargo.

=== Deceptive documentation and blending ===
Iranian oil is sometimes blended with oil from other countries and shipped with falsified documents listing incorrect origins, allowing it to enter legitimate markets.

== IRGC involvement ==
The IRGC is believed to control or benefit from a significant portion of the ghost fleet's activities. According to Reuters, nearly half of Iran's oil exports are under the control of the IRGC and its affiliates, often via front companies and cutout operators. These revenues are used to fund military operations and proxy groups across the Middle East, as well as to prop up allied regimes.

== Notable case studies ==
In February 2024, the U.S. Department of Justice announced seizures and criminal charges against individuals and entities linked to a billion-dollar trafficking network that had delivered illicit Iranian oil to foreign buyers using a series of front companies, tankers, and brokers. Among the sanctioned facilitators was an Iranian-linked network operating through Turkey, the UAE, and Malaysia.

== Insurance from privately owned UK firm ==
In October 2025, Reuters exposed the involvement of the Maritime Mutual Insurance Association (MMIA), also known as the New Zealand P&I Club, a New Zealand-based insurance company owned by UK citizen Paul Rankin, along with two affiliates in Dubai, MME Services and Maritime Reinsurance, in the violation of sanctions against Iran. According to the report, the company facilitated the trade of billions of dollars worth of Iranian and Russian oil by providing insurance to vessels that evade Western sanctions, without which they would not be able to enter any ports, including those in Russia and Iran. Among the vessels insured by the company are one sixth of the tankers in the "shadow fleet", a network that conceals its activities through falsified tracking data and documents. According to David Tannenbaum, director of sanctions consultancy Blackstone Compliance Services and a former US Treasury sanctions specialist, the number of shadow fleet vessels insured by Maritime Mutual, far exceeds that of other major actors in sanctions evasion. Of 231 tankers identified by Reuters to have been insured by Maritime Mutual, 130 were exposed as having carried sanctioned cargo. According to Centre for Research on Energy and Clean Air (CREA) calculations based on commercial databases of individual oil trades and historic prices, vessels insured by Maritime Mutual carried $18.2 billion of Iranian oil and energy products and $16.7 billion of Russian energy products, since the sanctions were imposed. Despite the company's claims of compliance with international laws, New Zealand authorities are also investigating Maritime Mutual for additional potential violations related to money laundering and terrorism financing. During a police search of the Auckland and Christchurch premises various documents and records were confiscated. According to Global Fishing Watch, between 2018 and 2025 there were 274 cases in which ships insured by Maritime Mutual disabled their automatic identification system (AIS) or altered it to transmit false tracking data, a practice known as spoofing, commonly used by crews to hide their movements.

== Chinese purchasers and global impact ==
Despite sanctions, Chinese refiners remain the primary recipients of Iranian oil via the ghost fleet. United Against Nuclear Iran (UANI) has documented extensive evidence of China-based entities purchasing Iranian crude under falsified documentation, often labeled as Malaysian or Omani origin. This trade undermines international sanctions and contributes to increased regional tensions.

== Ties to Venezuela ==
Iran's “shadow fleet” assisted Venezuela sell oil despite international sanctions. The sanctions on both states tightened the connections between both countries. U.S. authorities and independent experts have found that tankers once used to avoid sanctions on Iranian oil were also used to carry Venezuelan oil. Ships moved oil from tanker to tanker, concealing the oil's origin, turned off or manipulated tracking systems, changed flags, and used shell companies to hide ownership. In several cases, the same ships first transported Iranian oil and later carried Venezuelan oil, which was then mixed or relabeled and sent mainly to Asian markets. This allowed Venezuela to use Iran's existing system for avoiding oil sanctions. U.S. seizures and sanctions against ships near Venezuela specifically mention their ties to Iran's shadow fleet, showing that both countries use many of the same methods and vessels to bypass oil sanctions.

In December 2025, during the United States operations of the coast of Venezuela, it increased pressure on Venezuela's sanctioned oil trade, closely linked to Iran's shadow fleet. U.S. forces seized the tanker Skipper near Venezuela, saying it was part of a network moving Iranian and Venezuelan oil to evade sanctions. After this, the U.S. added new sanctions on Venezuelan tankers and Maduro allies. President Donald Trump ordered a blockade of sanctioned oil ships entering or leaving Venezuelan waters. These actions caused some tankers to turn away and led to a sharp drop in oil traffic.

== Sanctions and enforcement efforts ==
U.S. authorities have targeted the ghost fleet through sanctions, seizures, and criminal indictments. UANI and other watchdogs regularly publish updated maps and trackers of Iranian tankers, some of which are refurbished vessels rebranded under new flags and ownership structures. The U.S. government has also seized multiple cargoes of smuggled oil and prosecuted those aiding Iran's efforts to bypass restrictions. On 23 January 2026 it was reported that the U.S. has sanctioned 9 more vessels connected to Iran's shadow fleet, as well as 8 firms related to it. In February 2026, it was reported that India had seized 3 Iranian oil tankers, sanctioned by the U.S.

== 2026 Iran war ==
During the 2026 Iran war, Iran's shadow fleet, became a crucial part of its income, as it kept Iran's export going, generating billions in revenue, while operating in a militarized shipping environment. Dozens of tankers continuously transported oil from Iran to Southeast Asia, mainly conducting Ship to Ship transfers close to Malaysia, before delivering it to China. As Iran closely controlled the traffic through the Strait of Hormuz, its shadow was a large share of the limited ships allowed through. Its fleet was a crucial financial lifeline, allowing Iran to sustain export during the war, while influencing traffic through the straits.

According to reports based on tracking data, during the US blockade on the Strait of Hormuz, more than 26 ships of Iran's shadow fleet managed to bypass the blockade. A report by the WSJ from May 2026, estimates that Iran's shadow fleet still holds 90 million oil barrels, outside of the American blockade. this estimates say this oil can hold Iran up to October 2026.

== Notable vessels and companies ==
Recent U.S. sanctions have targeted specific vessels, including:

- BENDIGO (IMO: 9289491)
- CARNATIC (IMO: 9304655)
- SALVIA (IMO: 9297319)
- LUNA PRIME (IMO: 9174220)
- ELZA (IMO: 9221671)
- GOODWIN (IMO: 9379703)
- ANHONA (IMO: 9354521)
- WEN YAO (IMO: 9288095)
- SPIRIT OF CASPER (IMO: 9224271)
- CRYSTAL ROSE (IMO: 9292228)
- CARINA (IMO: 9240512)
- DIMITRA II (IMO: 9208215)
- TYCHE I (IMO: 9247390)
- SATINA (IMO: 9308778)
- CROSS OCEAN (IMO: 9251810)
- AVENTUS I (IMO: 9280873)
- DAVINA (IMO: 9259367)
- BERG 1 (IMO: 9262168)
- VORAS (IMO: 9203265)
- HORNET (IMO: 9197844)
- SHANAYE QUEEN (IMO: 9242118)
- CAROL (IMO: 9070072)
- OCTANS (IMO: 9224295)
- Sea Bird
- Al Diab II
- Cesaria

== See also ==
- Axis of Unity
- Chinese shadow fleet
- Islamic Revolutionary Guard Corps
- Myanmar ghost ships
- Oil smuggling in Iran
- Sanctions against Iran
- United Against Nuclear Iran
- Venezuela Iran ghost flights
