= Chinese shadow fleet =

Chinese fleet involved in illegal activities

Ships from the People's Republic of China or those operated by Chinese nationals sometimes use methods to evade economic sanctions in order to fish illegally or import oil from Iran, operating as a shadow fleet.

== Background ==
China's dark fleet expanded during the 2000s, first to increase amounts of seafood fishing and later for obtaining oil from countries like Iran and Venezuela. Chinese and Taiwanese fishing fleets are the world's largest, followed by those of Japan, South Korea, and Spain.

== Methods ==
Ships of Chinese origin employ several means to evade detection. Like other dark fleets, they can disable their automatic identification system (AIS) transponders. They may be registered under various flags-of-convenience such as Panama, Liberia, or Gambia in order to obscure ownership, skirt regulations, and avoid accountability. Crude oil from sources under sanctions can be transferred from vessel to vessel in international waters before ending up in China. GPS spoofing, also known as software defined geofencing, is used to send a fake location signal while a ship is actually at a different location.

== Locations ==
Fleets from China have fished illegally off the coasts of Ecuador and Peru near the Galápagos Islands, into the Argentine Sea of Argentina, along the shores of West Africa, as well as in North Korean waters, creating impacts that are felt among coastal communities of South Korea and Russia. Transfers of crude oil from Iran to China have taken place in the waters off Malaysia; neither China nor Malaysia are legally bound by United States sanctions against Iran.

== Implications ==
=== Economic ===
Most of the vessels in the Chinese shadow fleet operate without the overt oversight of large entities. Some of them are more than a decade old and can be difficult to detect when their AIS transponders are off. This increases the risk of a collision or oil spill. In the past when other dark fleet vessels had accidents, their owners were difficult to identify and track down.

=== Geopolitical ===
China's dark fleet is used by Beijing to maintain independence in areas like energy and food supply. It is a powerful tool for the country's strategy in sensitive areas such as the South China Sea, East China Sea, and Yellow Sea, where they can collect intelligence, monitor foreign activity, and strengthen China's territorial claims in disputed water.

== Reactions ==
=== United States ===
In recent years the United States has issued new sanctions targeting more than 50 individuals, entities, and over 50 vessels linked to China's dark fleet and its clandestine oil transport networks, supporting Iran. The United States regards these actions as the most extensive since the 2018 "maximum pressure" campaign. Investigations that were conducted have monitored an rise in ship-to-ship oil transfers in international waters near Malaysia. In addition, the United States and other international officials documented unprecedented activity and revenue flows of up to $70 billion, enabling Iran to sustain its regime and nuclear ambitions despite sanctions. The vessels Alps (alias), Eon, and Stellar Oracle have been sanctioned for their involvement.

=== Other countries ===
In addition to the United States, United Kingdom and the European Union have tried to ban certain ships and limit the insurance and shipping services that support China's dark fleet. But as different countries have different standards, these efforts have encountered problems. Trying to target companies and insurers involved in these illegal actions has made it harder for global businesses to handle risks and follow maritime trade rules.

== See also ==
- Economy of China
- Illegal, unreported and unregulated fishing
- Iranian shadow fleet
- Oil smuggling in Iran
- North Korean ghost ships
- Russian shadow fleet
