= Shadow fleet =

Sanction evasion in the maritime domain

A shadow fleet, also referred to as a dark fleet, is a ship or group of such shadow ships, "...that uses concealing tactics to smuggle sanctioned goods". Shadow fleets are a direct response to international or unilateral economic sanctions. The term therefore more broadly refers to practices of sanction-busting in the maritime domain through the use of unregistered or fraudulent vessels. Goods commonly exported and imported include raw materials such as oil and iron, luxury goods, and weapons and defense technologies.

Shadow fleets use a wide range of layered techniques, aimed at obscuring their activities or keeping plausible deniability. Though those techniques are well documented and are similar across actors, they create enforcement problems for authorities due to lack of coordination, cooperation, or resources and political will. Moreover, shadow fleets operate in legal grey zones, often on the high seas beyond the jurisdiction of coastal states, making arrests and seizures difficult.

Since the Russian invasion of Ukraine in 2022, the Russian shadow fleet smuggling Russian oil for export has drawn renewed attention. This has led to growing concerns about the geopolitical impacts of such fleets, their significance with regards to sanctions' enforcement and efficacy, and the safety and security risks they create. Indeed, as 'dark' vessels use deceptive practices and often constitute ageing vessels, they "present a serious threat to maritime security, safety and the marine environment". The International Maritime Organization signaled its desire to create new enforcement mechanisms against grey ships, signing a resolution in October 2023 that defined for the first time the term 'dark' ship. It noted that:

a fleet of between 300 and 600 tankers primarily comprised of older ships, including some not inspected recently, having substandard maintenance, unclear ownership and a severe lack of insurance, was currently operated as a 'dark fleet' or 'shadow fleet' to circumvent sanctions and high insurance costs.

— IMO, Addressing ship-to-ship oil transfers and tankers in the "dark fleet", 110th session of the Legal Committee (April 2023)

== Practices and techniques ==
Various techniques are employed by shadow fleets in order to mask the identity of the vessels, their destination and origin points, or to fabricate paperwork for trading purposes. Such techniques are often used in a layered and complex manner making enforcement more difficult and generating additional compliance costs and risk for private companies across the maritime supply chain. Those practices may exploit legal flaws in the International Maritime Organization (IMO) registration and transmission requirements, insurance loopholes, and the lack of cooperation between geopolitical adversaries.

=== Automatic Identification System manipulation ===
Automatic identification system or AIS is an IMO-mandated transponder aboard all registered vessels which transmits the identity and location of ships. This is publicly accessible data. The technology allows data-tracking for ships on the high seas, and underpins the system as both a "regulatory weapon and compliance shield". Yet its limitations have been exploited thoroughly by sanction busting actors. Because of the voluntary nature of the system, AIS-data transmission can be turned off, allowing for ships to 'disappear' when engaging in illegal or illicit activities.

Sanction enforcement can counter such practices by including AIS switch-off clauses in insurance contract. They can also track the AIS switch offs with satellite imagery or artificial intelligence to track suspicious ships. However, the system allows for plausible deniability, as for example the transponder could have been switched off for security reasons, or due to power-outages on board.

Spoofing, which is largely used by Iran's ghost fleet, has been defended by industry experts as a means to counter piracy, and can involve the large-scale transmission of data to drown sensitive information. This explains the industry pressure for the transmission system to remain voluntary and not mandatory, which would help enforce sanctions. AIS spoofing also refers more generally to the deliberate manipulation of ship location or identification data to mask a 'shadow' vessel's illegal activity.

Failure to broadcast or malfunctioning AIS can also have serious consequences and decreases safety at the seas.

=== Ship-to-ship transfers ===
Ship-to-ship cargo transfers refer to the use of intermediary vessels to bring goods to shore. This allows shadow fleets to stay on the high seas, avoid detection and seizure by coastal authorities, and smuggle their cargo in.

Bunkering refers to the re-fueling of ships at sea through an intermediary tanker. This allows illegal vessels to remain on the high seas for extended period of time and avoid detection.

Both practices are legal but regulated in the territorial waters of coastal states. The use of such strategies on the high seas exists in a legal grey zone and is difficult to detect, though sanctioned entities are often prohibited from benefiting from such transfers. In a report in 2013, the International Maritime organization acknowledged that such practices generated considerable risks to commercial shipping, safety, and environmental security:

ship-to-ship transfers in the high seas were high risk activities that undermined the international regime with respect to maritime safety, environmental protection and liability and compensation needed to be urgently addressed

— IMO, Addressing ship-to-ship oil transfers and tankers in the "dark fleet", 110th session of the Legal Committee (April 2023)

=== Registration and identity laundering ===
Generally speaking, vessel identity tampering refers to the process of masking 'shadow' vessels real identities in order to trade sanctioned goods, and make detection more difficult.

The concept of vessel identity laundering represents a new and more sophisticated method employed by several North Korean ships, and likely vessels from other sanctioned states. Unlike traditional identity tampering, which involves blurring the ship's physical, digital, and registered identities, vessel identity laundering exploits flaws in the IMO numbering system to create a complete shell identity. Direct identity laundering refers to the creation of a new legitimate ship identity by registering an unclean vessel under a new clean identity. Indirect laundering refers to the use of a second 'clean' ship loaning its identity to the dark ship.

Those techniques are efficient due to a multitude of factors. First, it leaves plausible deniability to companies involved, therefore encouraging reduced due diligence by private actors. Second, it exploits the flaws in the IMO registration process which does not require in-person verification of a new vessel identity. Third, it profits from the weak protection granted by AIS and MMSI numbering systems.

Vessel identity laundering is also tied to routine flag changes aimed at obscuring a vessel's origin. A U.S. Department of The Treasury report detailed that out of the six vessels involved in sanction evasion, three were sailing under the flag of Cameroon, one under Liberia, and two under the Russian flag at the time of the report. Currently, none of these vessels, identified by their IMO numbers, are registered under their previous flags. Instead, six out of the seven have switched to the convenience flag of Cameroon, while one has opted for the flag of Tanzania.

=== Financial ===
As soon as shadow ships have made a delivery, the question arises how this delivery will be reimbursed. Many sanctioned entities face here the difficulty of being effectively paid. US and EU sanctions can seriously restrict the use of the international banking system (SWIFT) and access to Dollars and Euros, the two main currencies used in international trade. Sanctioned countries and their trade partners must therefore be inventive to circumvent the financial aspect of a sanctions regime. This shows that the intended functioning of a shadow fleet is dependent on a complex layer of on-shore strategies. Shadow fleets are therefore often deeply intertwined with illicit activities beyond the maritime domain like financial and administrative fraud.

For example, in the case of North Korea, Stanton points out that "long before North Korean vessels conduct ship-to-ship transfers under the cover of night, on-shore operatives go to extraordinary lengths to establish anonymous shell companies, falsify financial and ownership records and bribe customs officials".

Common methods to circumvent financial sanctions that can be employed for the reimbursement of sanctioned goods, at least in the case of Iran, include:

==== Front companies ====
Sanctioned entities may decide to found shell companies in non-sanctioned countries through which business with the rest of the world can then be further facilitated, on behalf of the in-reality sanctioned entity. For trade partners it is often, at first glance, not necessarily obvious anymore that they do business with a sanctioned entity. When links to the sanctioned entity are uncovered, the front company will in many cases be struck by secondary sanctions. Front companies will therefore be usually set up in countries where compliance oversight is low and/or where political elites generally disagree with the imposition of sanctions.

==== Local and cryptocurrency use ====
A sanctioned entity might just accept the local currency of the country it ships goods to. The problem here is that these currencies are often less useful on international markets than, for example, the US Dollar. It can still be used for purchases within that specific country and money transfers can happen through non-Western financial mechanisms (e.g. SEPAM by Iran, SPFS by Russia, CIPS by China as alternatives to SWIFT). The relative anonymity of cryptocurrencies offers a new way to get around financial sanctions.

==== Exchange offices ====
Exchange offices offer an opportunity to launder a "weak", local currency into a hard one. Exchange offices can also technically serve as bank branches when a money transfer is carried out by one person paying in a certain amount of money in one office and another receiving the equivalent amount of money in a hard currency on the other end. Again, limited oversight is important for such operations.

==== Bartering ====
Bartering describes the practice of the direct exchange of goods. That way, exports can be reimbursed non-monetarily. These exchanges can theoretically include specifically requested goods, consumer products or goods of generally assumed value, like gold.

== Flag states ==
Flags of convenience, also referred to as open registries, are maritime flags associated with countries that impose minimal to no nationality requirements on vessel owners and operators. These registries, predominantly managed by approximately forty states worldwide, are thought to prioritize profit over safety, environmental protection, and compliance with international regulations. Flags of convenience serve as a central component in facilitating maritime sanctions evasion by offering a streamlined process for flag registration. Vessels registered under these flags frequently engage in deceptive shipping practices, including flag hopping, disabling vessel identification systems, and conducting ship-to-ship oil transfers, particularly involving aged tankers operating in sanctioned oil trades.

=== Prominent open registries ===
Identifying open registries engaged in sanctions evasion poses a challenge due to the clandestine nature of such activities. However, among the most prominent open registries possibly implicated in sanctions evasion are Panama, Liberia, and the Republic of the Marshall Islands.

Panama, with its registry dating back to 1916, has grown substantially over the years, accounting for one of the largest share of ships worldwide. It has been implicated in sanction evasion schemes involving Russian, Iranian, and Venezuelan oil.

Historically tied to the United States, Liberia's registry quickly gained momentum as an alternative to Panama. Recent developments indicate a shift away from the Liberian flag, particularly of the Russian dark fleet, due to increased sanctions enforcement by the United States .

The Republic of the Marshall Islands emerged as another significant flag state, with its registry managed by a privately held maritime and corporate registry service based in the United States. Similar to Liberia, recent developments indicate a decrease in vessels flying the Marshallese flag, with dozens of oil tankers ceasing to sail under its flag in response to increased US sanctions enforcement.

After Panama has removed almost 70 ships from its register, Barbados followed suit in 2025: The ship registry of the Caribbean state announced that 46 ships from the Russian shadow fleet would be flagged out. The owners have been asked to take up the country's flag due to new sanctions by UK.

=== Other implicated flags ===
Other flags under scrutiny for sanctions evasion include Tanzania, Fiji, Cambodia, Mongolia, and Gabon. These registries have been found to facilitate illegal activities, particularly in relation to North Korea. Despite efforts to address these issues, concerns remain about their role in facilitating sanction-busting activities.

Before its closure in 2002, Cambodia's registry was involved in a wide variety of illegal activities, including smuggling and trafficking. Cambodia claimed to have terminated its contract with the Cambodian Ship Registration Management Committee and ceased the flag of convenience business. However, reports from 2020 indicate that North Korean vessels still manipulate Cambodian flags to evade sanctions.

Despite being landlocked, Mongolia emerged as a flag of convenience, attracting sanctioned states with lax regulations and quick registration processes. Concerns have been raised about its involvement in controversial maritime activities and facilitation of sanction evasion.

Gabon is possibly rising as a new flagging option for Russia and Iran-linked tankers. A surge in vessels flying the Gabon flag has been reported following increased sanctions enforcement on Liberian and Marshall Islands flags.

=== Fraudulent use of flags ===
Throughout 2025, the fraudulent use of flags has become more and more common across the Russian shadow fleet. GISIS, the ships database of the International Maritime Organisation (IMO) listed 367 tankers as false flagged as of April 4, 2026. These ships fly the flag of a state without actually being registered in that country's international ship register.

This is often due to fraudulent websites pretending to represent the international ship registry of a country, without having obtained the mandate for doing so by that country. In July, 2025, Lloyd’s List reported to have uncovered 21 inter-linked fraudulent flag and crewing operations, all linked back to the same scam operation. In September 2025, Lloyd’s reported that also a registry claiming to act on behalf of Mozambique was linked to this scam operation.

==== Flag states exploited by fraudulent registries ====
1. Aruba, Curaçao & Sint Maarten - In Feb 2026, the Netherlands informed on behalf of these autonomous countries within the Kingdom of the Netherlands, that the IMO that Aruba and Sint Maarten do not have an international registry, while Curaçao does but with less than 20 registered vessels, none of them tankers.
2. Botswana - On May 7, Botswana reiterated in a letter to the IMO, that it does not operate either a national nor an international ships register.
3. Guyana - In December 2025, Guyana's Maritime Administration Department (MARAD) released a warning about the fraudulent use of its flag. The EU's ships database Equasis lists 63 ships falsely flagged as Guyana, most of them tankers.
4. Madagascar - In February 2026, Madagascar’s authorities are reported to have stated that the country does not have an international registry but has identified nine ships that are using flag-state documents in its name.
5. Malawi - “In June 2025, the Government of Malawi informed the Organization of the fraudulent use of its flag and of the Maritime Mobile Service Identity numbers being affiliated with the fake Malawi Ship Registry (https://malawi.marinegov.net/). The web page is not accessible anymore. The Government confirmed that it did not operate an international registry and reported the fraud to INTERPOL for the investigation of individuals who posed as public officers and certified the ships as Malawian-registered. As requested, the information was circulated through Circular Letter No.5040. In September 2025, there were 27 ships fraudulently flying the flag of Malawi.”

=== Characteristics and strategies ===
The evasion of sanctions through flags of convenience is facilitated by structural characteristics of the registering states and strategic maneuvers by sanctioned entities. Open registries, being predominantly small states with limited resources, lack the financial incentives to invest in effective regulatory practices, and by taking advantage of jurisdictional control they have through the process of flagging and registering, they prioritize revenue generation over rigorous compliance measures. By providing the possibility for anonymous, online vessel registrations, or by commissioning the practice to privately run registries, open registries obstruct international detection efforts and are more vulnerable to infiltration by individuals with ties to sanctioned activities.

Sanctions evaders also strategically select these registries because to their lower detection rates and cost-saving measures, aiming at exploiting the weaknesses in their enforcement mechanisms. The possibility of capitalizing on the minimal application and administrative fees, as well as nominal tonnage taxes offered by open registries, renders such practice highly economical for sanctioned states.

=== Implications of flagging practices ===
The flagging practice of open registries can have significant implications. The reputation of flag states can be impacted, potentially resulting in economic repercussions such as trade bans. Additionally, the lack of transparency and accountability in vessel ownership complicates efforts to enforce regulations and hold responsible parties accountable in case of accidents or environmental disasters.

== North Korea ==
=== Context ===
The emergence of North Korea's 'shadow fleets' are a direct response to the multilateral comprehensive sanctions imposed against the regime following nuclear ballistic missile tests since 2016. Through the use of more and more sophisticated sanction busting practices in the maritime domain, the Democratic People's Republic of Korea has attempted to maintain imports of basic commodities, raw materials, aid, and luxury goods, but also to finance its regime through the export of iron ore, coal or textiles. The shadow fleets also allow North Korea to continue its proliferation activities through the sale of weapons and to allegedly participate in the illegal narcotics trade.

==== Maritime sanctions ====
Sanction busting practices are a direct response to international sanctions. The sanction regime against North Korea today is very broad and encompassing, but more recently deployed than commonly thought. In the post-Cold War era, the international community responded with openness to the Kim regime following the 1994 famine, despite evidence of growth in transnational criminal activity and nuclear proliferation following the collapse of the USSR and 1994 death of Kim Il-Sung. The Agreed Framework signed under the Clinton administration led to a short-lived relaxation in sanctions as the Democratic People's Republic of Korea (DPRK) committed to divest from its nuclear program.

The pattern of UN sanctions follows missile testing and military provocations by the Kim regime. Sanctions have also been invoked on human rights grounds. The sanction regime has been criticized as "patchwork", "sewn on opportunistically when North Korea provocations create political will" yet drastically challenged by lack of interest or capacity to use the full power of the law.

- UNSC Res. 1718 (2006) was the first large sanction package voted against North Korea. It targeted WMD proliferation and assets used to that purpose – which theoretically includes smuggling ships for coal, oil, weapons and luxury goods, used to support the regime. It also established a monitoring committee ("the 1718 committee").
- It focused on comprehensive and targeted financial sanctions, requiring member states to "freeze immediately the funds, other financial assets and economic resources which are on their territories that are owned or controlled, directly or indirectly, by the persons or entities designated". This first resolution included the maritime domain by specifying that the prohibition extended to flag ships directly or indirectly trading sanctioned goods with North Korea.

Following a lull between 2006 and 2015, mainly due to Chinese and Russian reticence, a fuller and stricter UN sanction regime came into effect starting 2015 following US unilateral sanctions. This "most sophisticated and comprehensive" regime included a wave of sanctions – mainly comprehensive economic ones – between 2016 and 2019. Some included specific recommendations concerning enforcement in the maritime domain:

- UNSC Res. 2270 (2016) which forbids any sale or transfer of coal, iron and iron ore. It includes a clause for the inspection of all passing cargo to and from North Korea, prohibition of all weapons trade, additional restrictions on imports of luxury goods, and expulsion of diplomats suspected of illicit activities.
- UNSC Res. 2321 (2016) specifies that "all Member States are prohibited from leasing, chartering their flagged vessels, aircraft or providing crew services to the DPRK, designated service or entities, or any persons or entities" having assisted in sanction violation. It also includes stricter recommendations for de-registering vessels involved in sanction busting. It furthermore prohibited "from owning, leasing, operating, chartering, or providing vessel classification, certification or associated service and insurance or re-insurance, to any DPRK-flagged, owned, controlled or operated vessel". It therefore broadened the sanction enforcement mechanisms across the maritime supply-chain.
- UNSC Res. 2375 (2017) added quotas on oil, and allowed both the search of suspicious ships, but also their seizure and transfer to port for inspection. It created a process for 'designating vessels' allowing for bans on port entry for vessels transporting items sanctioned under previous resolutions. It also paid close attention to practices which allow for sanction busting: drawing attention to the "facilitating or engaging in ship-to-ship transfers to or from DPRK-flagged vessels of any goods or items that are being supplied, sold or transferred from the DPRK".
- UN Res. 2397 (2017) required member states to de-register any vessels owned or operated by the DPRK, or for which they have "reasonable ground" to believe were involve in transporting sanctioned goods.

The sanction regime against North Korea is unique in its broadness and the fact that it is led by the United Nations Security Council. The DPRK is also under unilateral sanctions and sanctions by other supranational bodies such as the European Union.

==== 2024 developments ====
In April 2024, Russia vetoed the renewal of the panel of expert on North Korean sanctions implementation tasked with assisting the 1718 committee. It highlights that – despite progress in recent years on sanction enforcement – the sanction regime against North Korea is dependent on agreement between the 5 permanent members of the United Nations Security Council. Without the compliance and assistance of both China and Russia, efforts to coordinate surveillance and enforcement against North Korea are subject to fail. This comes as allegations surfaced that North Korea is supplying ammunition to Russia in the context of the invasion of Ukraine.

=== Critical implications ===
==== Sanction architecture and criticisms ====
As a tool of foreign policy, sanctions aim to coerce a member of the international community to comply with demands. From a policy-making perspective, the criteria for measuring the effectiveness of sanctions relies on how it helps achieve the stated goals. We need to distinguish between intermediary and end goals in assessing sanction efficacy: intermediary goals correspond to inflicting (economic) damage, in the hope of achieving larger long-term goals. Thus smart sanctions are to be adjusted with political and economic settings.

In the case of North Korea, sanctions have aimed primarily to force the regime to abandon its nuclear program, uphold human rights, and more broadly produce democratic regime change. In his book "The Root of All Evil", Stanton argues that sanctions against North Korea have not been effective, as they have not led to regime change. Instead, they have led to the consolidation of a system where food and money are monopolized by a small elite. He argues that every crisis emerging from North Korea, including sanction busting for nuclear proliferation or the global arms trade, but also aid-related sanction busting – is "inextricably intertwined with its kleptocracy and corruption". On the one hand, the lack of sanction enforcement at sea contributes to this failure. On the other hand, scholars have been critical of the focus on maritime enforcement rather than the more extensive use of financial tools targeted at individuals and companies supporting the North Korean regime.

The bottom-up design of North Korean sanctions, which aims at generating political pressure for regime change from within by imposing economic hardships has been criticized on humanitarian grounds. The sanction architecture's comprehensive rather than targeted approach (specifically in the financial sector) has been criticized for its inefficiency and humanitarian impacts, as sanction busting allows the maintenance of an enriched and loyal elite while the population bears the cost of wide-ranging bans on commodity goods.

==== Legal debates and counter-proliferation ====
The legal architecture of the sanction regime in the maritime domain has been advanced as an explanation for the failure to achieve its goals.

Non-proliferation is a central focus of the sanction architecture, driving political will for enforcement efforts. However, this emphasis can relegate other maritime concerns – but also diplomatic ones – to secondary status, potentially undermining broader enforcement effectiveness.

The 2003 Proliferation Security Initiative (PSI) stands out as a prominent example of efforts directed at naval interdiction and at-sea enforcement against North Korea's regime. This international cooperation program aims to curb the trafficking of weapons of mass destruction. Though created outside of the UN system, PSI led to the adoption of a Declaration on Interdiction Principles adopted by the United Nation Security Council through Resolution 1540, but measures recommended remain non-binding as the PSI is primarily a coordination and cooperation agreement. Despite the wide-ranging and strict approach promoted, provisions for maritime enforcement create tensions with regard to the United Nations Convention on the Law of the Seas (UNCLOS). Enforcement necessitates stopping and searching vessels in international waters, which is contrary to the norm of Mare Liberum (Freedom of the seas) and with the right of flag states to give or withdraw consent for searches enclosed in UNCLOS.

The PSI when applied to North Korea has garnered legitimacy through IMO protocols, international treaties, and UN Security Council resolutions on sanctions, which make it much more enforceable since 2016. However, the rule of flag-state consent still renders enforcement difficult as North Korean ships register with flags of convenience. The text of UN Security Council Resolutions on North Korea makes clear this legal tension:

12. Affirms that paragraphs 7, 8 and 9 apply only with respect to the situation in the DPRK and shall not affect the rights, obligations, or responsibilities of Member States under international law, including any rights or obligations under the United Nations Convention on the Law of the Sea of 10 December 1982, with respect to any other situation and underscores in particular that this resolution shall not be considered as establishing customary international law

— United Nations Security Council, "Resolution 2375" (2017)

The So San case illustrates the complexities of enforcement. Despite the discovery of Scud missiles aboard a vessel bound for Yemen, legal ambiguity led to the ship's release by the US and Spanish authorities, highlighting the challenges and limitations of maritime sanction enforcement.

Yet, scholars such as Kraska underscore that despite current issues, "the legal process is the best tool available, albeit an imperfect one, to counter North Korea's maritime proliferation of nuclear weapons and technology".

=== Incidents ===
The practices of North Korean 'shadow fleets' always combine various strategies such as automatic identification system (AIS) spoofing or data manipulation, use of flags of convenience, or vessel identity tampering. Techniques are increasing in "scale, scope and sophistication" with enforcement efforts. The comprehensive design of sanctions and the lack of attention to enforcement against private sector partners create a large challenge for sanctions' success.

As of May 2024, there were 59 vessels on the '1718 committee' designated vessels' list.

There is little public record of successful enforcement against North Korean 'shadow' ships, though some cases have been well documented.

- The 2018/2019 Wise Honest incident: this cargo ship was seized by Indonesia on behalf of the United States. It had disabled its AIS transponder and was sailing without a flag to ship heavy machinery and coal. The stoppage of the vessel signaled willingness to enforce sanctions, but did not have a significant impact without additional seizures. The case drew attention because of the involvement of US companies in unwittingly financing its operations. The ship was eventually released and sold for scrap by the United States Marshals and the profits donated to victims of the Kim regime.
- The Chong Chon Gang case involved a North Korean freighter concealing Cuban weapons under sugar. Seized by Panamanian authorities in July 2013, the incident garnered significant media attention. The cargo included two jet fighters and Russian surface-to-air missiles. While satellite tracking played a crucial role in this case, it also highlighted failures, such as the inability to track North Korean proliferation activities. The incident led to a report by the Panel of Experts on North Korean Sanctions, which emphasized the importance of cooperation and information sharing on the modus operandi of sanction busting vessels.
- Chinpo Shipping Company was a company operating out of Singapore allowing for Chong Chon Gang to operate. Studies show Ocean Maritime Management (OMM), the main North Korean government-controlled shipping company used Chinpo to conceal its transactions, using elaborate – but not undetectable – financial fraud to export sanctioned goods. The company was fined $125,700 in 2016 for its role in facilitating the shipment of sanctioned goods.
- De Yi is a cargo ship seized by South Korean authorities in April 2024. The vessel was not flying a flag and allegedly transporting sanctioned goods on route to Russia. South Korea had recently sanctioned two other ships, Angara and Lady R, for allegedly transporting sanctioned goods between Russia and North Korea.

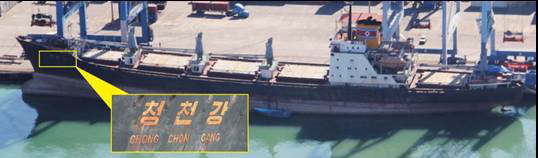
Chong Chon Gang

Other shadow ships allegedly involved in sanction busting have been documented by private companies or news agencies:

- Project Sandstone, by the British defence and security think-tank Royal United Service Institute (RUSI) documents since 2019 the illicit activities of several ships transporting oil, coal and other sanctioned goods from North Korea.
- In its report 'Unmasked', the non-profit C4ADS documents the complex layers of ship identity laundering and tampering used by 11 DPRK vessels using AIS data and satellite imagery. Detailed in the report, are the case of the Kingsway which was sanctioned by the UNSC for engaging in ship-to-ship transfers with a North Korean tanker, and the case of the Subblic which was recommended for designation to the UN Panel of Experts.
- NK Pro, the analysis and research resource of web newspaper NK News uses satellite imagery and AIS data to document North Korean illicit trade with Russia from the port of Rason (Rajin) and the activity of two ships (Lady R and MV Angara) allegedly delivering weapons. It has previously documented vessels transiting goods to Chinese port of Longkou.

==== Trading partners ====
The states and private companies trading with North Korean 'shadow' fleets are not often studied or recorded though Chinese cooperation allows the DPRK to participate in both aid-based and trade-based sanction busting. Chinese non-cooperation alone can undercut international efforts given the large and unsustainable dependency of North Korea on the country: 84% of its external trade is with China. Chinese companies and authorities facilitate the operation of North Korean shadow fleets by letting vessels be registered under their flag, allowing blacklisted vessels to stop and trade through their ports, or providing an alternative to the dollar to make illegal transactions. There is also evidence of Chinese companies selling technological systems to sanctioned countries: for example, the ZTE USA case in the United States involved the prosecution of a large Chinese telecommunications company suspected of trading software and hardware to Iran, and planning to export them to North Korea as well.

Other partners are often other sanctioned states or communist and former communist states which are a major source of exports revenue for the regime. Factors contributing to African states trading ties with North Korea include: historical and ideological links, the need for cheap armament, low capacity for sanction enforcement, a desire to mitigate Chinese influence, or anti-colonialism and anti-western rhetoric on the objectionability of sanctions. Cambodia and Fiji ties with the regime have also been documented, specifically as it provides flags of convenience or MMSI data – sometimes unwittingly – to North Korean ships. Finally, Malaysia-based companies Glocom and Kay Marine have also acted as fronts for the country's arm trade.

== Russia ==
=== Context ===
Oil and natural gas are crucial resources for the Russian economy and its efforts to advance its geopolitical ambitions. To decrease Russian revenues from such products, the EU has implemented 13 sanctions packages since February 2022. Many of these sanctions have targeted ships linked to financial institutions; those that help Russia evade sanctions; those involved in Russia's Ministry of Defense operations; and generally support Russia's efforts to wage war. However, despite the sanctions, Russia's economy seems to have suffered to a limited extent. More precisely, its annual revenues from oil increased by 28% in 2022 from 2021, with energy revenues increasing by 15% in September 2023. In October 2023 statistics have shown that the average price of Russian oil was above $80, despite the price cap of $60 per barrel, and Russia has maintained an important surge of manufactured goods that are used for the military. These factors have likely permitted Russia to increase its defense spending from 3.9 to 6 percent of GDP in 2024, and kept Russia equipped and able to resist Ukraine counteroffensive operations.

Much of the Western strategy to hamper Russia's war efforts has relied on two separate embargoes. First, a price cap of $60 per barrel has been established to decrease oil revenues. The Cap Coalition consists of the G7 countries, the EU, and Australia. These countries are permitted to provide services in support of Russian oil sales, including shipping, insurance and trade finance under the condition that the price of Russian oil does not exceed $60 per barrel. The goal is to keep Russian oil on the market, while decreasing Russian revenues that would aid its war effort. The second embargo from the EU/G7 countries has banned Russian oil imports, which has forced Russia to find new buyers for almost three-quarters of its oil exports, given that Europe has traditionally been Russia's main export market. European waters have been the receiving space for over 80% of seaborne exports, and Russia has turned to China and India among other countries for its exports. In addition to sanctions Russian resources, a third important sanction package has been directed at technology exports in order to deny Russia access to components which can be used for its war weapons. The technologies under scrutiny include ball bearings, electrical transformers, high priority dual use items like integrated circuits, and radio frequency transceiver modules. Through this, the West has attempted to capitalize on the fact that Russia's military production relies on foreign components. That is because its technology is assessed to be 15 years behind the US and China.

=== Circumventing practices used to avoid oil sanctions ===
There are a number of ways in which shadow fleets are used by Russia to evade sanctions. In 2023 small unknown trading firms that do not have history in the business have started to replace the major oil firms and commodity houses that abide international sanctions. These small entities export much of the Russian crude oil to Asia, and then quickly close business. In result, it has been shown that "less than a quarter of the currently used ships are officially sailing under the G7 or Norway's jurisdiction and therefore must respect the cap, reaching numbers estimated around 1.400 ships in 2024. Many of the shadow tankers sail under the flags of countries such as Liberia, Palau, Gabon or Cameroon, since they have not adopted major maritime conventions or do not have the necessary capacity to enforce regulations on their vessels. Furthermore, many tankers that carry Russia crude oil have their origins unknown. The way the strategy works is that before ships reach their destinations, the cargo changes hands, making it more difficult to track. However, if some companies or tankers are identified to be violating sanctions, their company and tanker names are changed. Often the destination of oil tankers is also undisclosed, and after reaching Chinese, Indian, or UAE ports, Russian oil is transferred to other oil tankers, it arrives in the ocean, and it blends into the global market. Turkey, India and the UAE have imported a lot of Russian oil, and have exported it back to Europe in the shape of oil products, which the EU does not restrict. To further minimize the potential of being discovered, many of Russia's oil fleet send fake signals to make their location unclear. They also turn off vessel tracking systems and avoid sharing information with coastal and flag state authorities. Shipping companies also use fake IMO numbers, which is a convenient strategy since officials rarely spend much time investigating IMO numbers. This modus operandi increases Russian crude oil sales and its price.

==== Incidents ====
- As an example of Russia using its shadow fleet to avoid sanctions, Lloyd's Intelligence reported how the tanker Anatoly Kolodkin was sailing for Ust-Luga, but after it was blacklisted it has made a U-turn and started signaling its destination as Novorossiysk.
- on 3 April 2024, Lloyd's Intelligence reported that on 3 April a sanctioned shadow tanker that seemed to not have insurance and had been deflagged by Liberia had left the fuel terminal Ust-Luga to the Baltic Sea through the strait between Denmark and Sweden. After that it continued its journey toward the North Sea and the Mediterranean.
- On 16 June 2025, Frontline Ltd.-owned tanker Front Eagle collided with the tanker Adalynn in the Gulf of Oman. Frontline could not reach Adalynn's owner to talk about the incident, according to CEO Lars Barstad. Adalynn's anonymous controlling interests made no response. Adalynn's operator has an address in an old office complex in Navi Mumbai, India. The building is home to multiple shipping-related firms, but has no public directory to confirm whether Adalynn's operator is a tenant. The same Indian company also operates aging tanker Carcharodon, sanctioned by the United Kingdom for moving Russian oil. Both vessels are sanctioned by the government of Ukraine for involvement in Russia's shadow oil trade.
- On 8 June 2026, Sovcomflot controlled tanker Caroline Bezengi (ex SCF Altai) was damaged by an explosion off the coast of Yemen. The ship, loaded with 110,000 tons of Russian crude oil, and originally on its way to Sikka in India, was evacuated and drifted onto a reef near Al-Qibliyah island where it sprung a leak. By mid August 2026 an oil slick covering 800 square kilometers had developed, risk management firm Ambrey informed, that a "leading international oil spill response company" has been hired to deal with the incident. The official owner is listed as "Rentoor Ship Management", located in an apartment block in Shanghai.

==== Important actors that aid Russia ====
Russia has also developed partnerships or relationships with states that actively support its efforts to evade sanctions. The UAE is one example, and it has allowed Russian oligarchs to launder money through its ports. The UAE also rejected US requests to pump more oil to reduce Russian oil revenue by reducing global oil prices. In the first four months of 2023, out of the top 20 traders of Russian crude oil, almost half were registered in the UAE. Russia has extensively used the port city of Fujairah to continue trading, and the port has increased its storage of Russian oil from zero in April 2022 to 131,000 barrels a day in December 2023. More than that, Russia has redirected its exports to Asia, Africa, and South America. China has been of particular importance, and it did not join the EU's embargo on Russian seaborne crude oil. The Asian power has accounted for 40% of Russian oil sales in 2021. India has also been an important actor. The country has become the biggest buyer of seaborne Russia crude, and it does not recognize the sanctions imposed on Russia. Tanker arrival data and Reuters have assessed that India has imported 10% of Russian imports in the first four months of 2023.

=== Circumventing practices used to evade sanctions on technological components ===
Russia has used a combination of tactics to circumvent restrictions on its technological imports, some of them being "rerouting critical imports via third countries or transshipment points, obfuscating customs data, and using civilian proxy entities to redirect items to military firms". Russia has managed to receive 98% of its components through third countries, and the strategy has been to use intermediaries who hide transactions through shell companies and use neutral third-country ports to receive and ship goods. In effect, these goods are exported to unsanctioned countries and after that are re-exported to Russia without the knowledge or consent of manufacturers. As an example, it has been found that while Texas Instruments shipped 36 direct shipments to Russia, almost 1,300 more shipments have been done through intermediaries. Channels of imports for Russia include Hong Kong and mainland Chinese intermediaries, Georgian port facilities, Kazakhstan, the UAE, North Korea and Iran. Hong Kong, for instance, has held an important transshipment port, and doubled its exports of semiconductors to Russia in 2022, reaching figures of around $400 million, and making it the second supplier of such components, after mainland China. Hong Kong is especially useful since it is hard for export control officials to conduct preshipment screening or post shipment checks, and that is because it has a huge volume or transshipment occurring through it, making it one of the busiest shipping hubs in the world. The ports of Morocco and Turkey have also been used for transshipment, and their ports often received goods from global tech manufacturing, which are then placed on other ships that leave towards Russia. This practice has been supported by trade officials who "shared tips on which ports would transfer goods, who would trade in rubles and where Russian-flagged ships could be repaired".

In addition to redirecting shipments, Russia uses the strategy of exploiting a loophole in the sanctions regime. In this context, Russia purchases foreign advanced electronics under the cover of dual-use. These goods are supposedly used for peaceful projects of space exploration and civilian appliances, but they can also be used for military purposes. The fact that many such non-military tech products are exempt from sanctions enables Russia to import them and use them for military means.

=== Why is enforcement of sanctions difficult ===
It is difficult for the US to challenge and hamper Russia's war effort because Western countries still need Russian oil on the market, especially given the high oil prices that result from growing tensions in the Middle East. If Russian oil was completely removed from the market, the price of oil would increase and energy markets would destabilize. Analysts have warned that if that were to happen, crude prices would increase to $200 a barrel. At the same time, countries that are both friendly to the US and neutral (such as Brazil or the UAE) have incentives to sell products to Russia, since they gain financial benefits from it. Another reason is that developing countries such as India, Indonesia, Brazil, Turkey, or Nigeria seek to maintain flexibility and avoid brawls and entanglements between major powers like China, Russia, and the US. Instead, these countries aim at developing relationships with China, Russia and the US to form a type of insurance policy in the event that these powers might go to war.

=== Russian shadow fleet in the Danish Straits ===
The Danish Straits are very significant for global maritime trade as they serve as a link between the Baltic and North Seas. This is why multiple reports mention the Danish Straits as a main hub for the Russian shadow fleet. On average, 2.9 Russian shadow vessels sail through these waters daily and between 1 October and 8 November 2023, at least 207 such vessels passed through the Danish Straits. From January 2023 to mid-2024, it is estimated that the Russian shadow fleet transported oil worth at least 770 billion DKK (approximately €103 billion) through the Danish Straits.

Navigating the Danish Straits is particularly challenging due to strong currents and winds, narrow and shallow passages, and heavy daily ship traffic. As a result, Danish and international guidelines recommend using a maritime pilot to steer vessels safely through these waters. All vessels with a depth of more than 11 meters are contacted by the Danish Naval Command if the vessel has not ordered a pilot, and are encouraged to order one. The naval command also keeps track of how many vessels refuse pilots and this number has risen from 1 in 20 in July 2023, to 1 in 5 in July 2024. When Russian shadow vessels frequently refuse to have pilots on board, this significantly increases the risk of groundings, collisions, and potentially catastrophic oil spills. Moreover, many of these vessels are staffed with crews unfamiliar with the Danish Straits, further heightening the likelihood of accidents.

Accidents involving the Russian shadow fleet in the Danish Straits have already occurred. One notable example is the Andromeda Star, which collided with another vessel in March 2024 near the northern tip of Jutland. Fortunately, the Andromeda Star was en route back to Russia and was not carrying oil at the time. Engine failures have also plagued these vessels. For instance, the Canis Power suffered an engine failure near the Danish island of Langeland in May 2023. Danish authorities had to board the ship while other oil tankers narrowly navigated between the Canis Power and the coastline, averting a potentially harmful incident. The Canis Power was carrying over 300,000 barrels of Russian oil, and an inspection conducted shortly after revealed 11 critical faults, including issues with its tanks, emergency systems, and fire extinguishing system. Although a major disaster has not yet occurred, analysts and Danish Maritime Pilots warn that it is only a matter of time. The combination of aging vessels in the shadow fleet, insufficient use of maritime pilots, and inadequate insurance poses a threat of collisions and oil spills. Such an incident could have devastating consequences for the environment and international trade that pass through Danish waters.

Danish defence experts have also warned that Russia could use oil tankers from the shadow fleet to deliberately cause an environmental disaster in the Danish Straits. This would increase economic and societal costs for Denmark (and Europe) and the consequences of such a disaster has been described as "insurmountable". By using shadow vessels, that are old and poorly maintained, it would be difficult to determine if an accident were intentional, a hallmark of hybrid warfare. Danish intelligence has previously highlighted Russia's plans for sabotaging critical infrastructure as part of its broader hybrid tactics.

Due to legal and practical limits it is difficult for Danish authorities to stop the Russian shadow vessels from entering its waters. According to the Copenhagen Convention of 1857 Denmark is legally obligated to let "innocent passage" vessels sail through its waters, meaning that shadow vessels cannot be denied access as long as they do not pose a concrete and immediate threat. UNCLOS III also allows for innocent passage. However, UNCLOS doesn't apply to straits in which long-standing treaties apply and the Danish Government asserts that the 1857 Copenhagen Convention qualifies as such a treaty under Article 35, meaning that UNCLOS part III, section 2, does not apply in the Danish Straits. However, there is no significant differences between 1857 Copenhagen convention and UNCLOS part III. It's also the Copenhagen Convention that makes it voluntary for vessels to have a pilot on board. The EU has pushed for Denmark to stop the vessels from sailing through its waters, but this is not a legally sustainable solution as Denmark needs a very good reason to block vessels. It has recently been debated if flying a false flag forfeits a vessel's right to innocent passage. France and Sweden have recently (2026) used this argument to seize the tankers Grinch and Sea Owl I.

Danish authorities have tried to address the issue in numerous ways. The Danish Maritime Authority has further refined the duty of maritime pilots to report defects and deficiencies on vessels, while Danish Defence monitors suspicious ships. The government has also initiated plans to upgrade the Danish marine environmental preparedness, as the current environmental ships are outdated and insufficient to handle large oil spills or other major accidents – these plans have, however, not been finished as of December 2024. Danish Foreign Minister Lars Løkke Rasmussen has said "There is a broad consensus that the dark fleet is an international problem, and that international solutions are required". On 16 December 2024 Denmark, along with the coalition of Nordic-Baltic Eight plus Germany and the United Kingdom, announced new measures to counter the Russian Shadow fleet. The new measures tasks "respective maritime authorities to request relevant proof of insurance from suspected shadow vessels as they pass through the English Channel, the Danish Straits of the Great Belt, the Sound between Denmark and Sweden, and the Gulf of Finland". The Danish Ministry of Foreign Affairs has said that this new measure is a result of Denmark gathering this coalition earlier in 2024 to look at the possibilities within international law to counter the challenges related to the shadow fleet. This initiative was further strengthened by more joint government statements:

- a June 2025 NB8++ joint statement on the shadow fleet stating 'If vessels fail to fly a valid flag in the Baltic Sea and the North Sea, we will take appropriate action within international law'.
- a Jan 2026 Open Letter by the Coastal States of the Baltic Sea and the North Sea with Iceland on the Growing Risks to Maritime Safety to the International Maritime Community signed by Belgium, Denmark, Estonia, Finland, France, Germany, Latvia, Lithuania, the Netherlands, Norway, Poland, Sweden, United Kingdom and Iceland on Feb 2, 2026, stressing that vessels crossing their territorial waters strictly need to comply with applicable international law, in order to exercise freedom of navigation.

== Venezuela and Cuba ==
=== Context ===
Sanctions can have severe consequences for the affected countries, notably for nations like Venezuela and Cuba, where oil export and import dependency is high. Venezuela relies heavily on oil exports to sustain its economy, making it imperative to continue these exports despite international sanctions. The imposition of sanctions on the South American continent has led to the emergence of numerous vessels that often fail to meet proper regulatory requirements.

=== U.S. sanctions on Venezuelan oil trade ===
On 5 April 2019, the U.S. Treasury sanctioned companies that continued trading oil from Venezuela despite existing sanctions. Notably, the trade occurred between two heavily sanctioned countries: Venezuela and Cuba. The vessel involved in this transaction was identified as Despina Andrianna, which was linked to Ballito Bay Shipping Incorporated and ProPer In Management Incorporated . Following its blacklisting by the U.S. government, the Despina Andrianna was reported as "out of service" by various vessel tracking websites in the same year. However, it was last tracked near the port of Saint Petersburg, Russia, on 8 October 2023.

=== Incidents involving Venezuelan oil vessels ===
A vessel named Liberty, carrying oil from Venezuela, was found aground near the shores of Indonesia. The Liberty, over 23 years old, had been deemed high risk in inspections conducted in 2017 and 2019. Additionally, another vessel, named Petition, which was transporting Venezuelan oil, was involved in a collision with another ship at the port of Cienfuegos in Cuba. Both vessels, Liberty and Petition, have a history of evading sanctions, indicating a persistent effort to bypass restrictions and revealing a recurring pattern in the strategies employed by the sanctioned countries.

=== Broader implications of sanctions ===
The U.S. Treasury has highlighted that the relationship between sanctioned nations such as Cuba and Venezuela extends beyond economic trade. In exchange for oil, Cuba provides financial compensation and sends military and medical personnel, political advisors, and engages in intelligence exchanges with the Maduro regime. This interconnectedness indicates the complex nature of the sanctions and their broader geopolitical implications.

=== Sanctions evasion network ===
A 2021 report by the U.S. Treasury identified at least three individuals, six vessels, and fourteen entities involved in the illicit crude oil trade linked to Venezuela . The complexity of these operations is underscored by the involvement of five companies across multiple countries: Jambanyani Safaris in Zimbabwe, D'Agostino & Company, Ltd in Venezuela, Catalina Holdings Corp and 82 Elm Realty LLC in New York City, and Element Capital Advisors Ltd in Panama. These companies are all connected to a key individual with close ties to the Maduro regime.

Mid December 2025 data analysts from Kpler compared the tankers visible on satellite images off Venezuelas oil port Puerto José at the time with the AIS transponder data, revealing that the majority of the ships had their transponders turned off. The transponder data of the tanker Star Twinkle 6 in mid December 2025 showed a fake location near Saint Vincent and the Grenadines while the last officially documented port visit of the ship, based on that data, was in China back on 3 May 2025.

=== International assistance in sanction evasion ===
Russia and China have played significant roles in aiding Venezuela to circumvent U.S. sanctions. Both countries have provided various forms of support, ranging from technological assistance to financial backing.

==== Chinese technological support ====
China has been a crucial partner for Venezuela, offering technology and expertise over the years. In 2017, the Chinese tech giant ZTE was contracted to develop new identification smart cards as part of a $70 million government initiative aimed at enhancing national security by monitoring and controlling citizen behavior. This move was part of broader efforts to consolidate government control and improve surveillance capabilities within Venezuela.

==== Russian financial assistance ====
Similarly, Russia has provided substantial financial support to Venezuela. In 2018, Evrofinance Mosnarbank, a Moscow-based bank primarily owned by entities directly associated with the Russian and Venezuelan governments, sought to finance Venezuela's state-issued cryptocurrency, Petro. This initiative aimed to provide Venezuela with an alternative means of conducting transactions and bypassing the financial restrictions imposed by U.S. sanctions. Despite these efforts, the Petro cryptocurrency has largely been deemed unsuccessful.

== Iran ==
=== Context ===
Iran has been one of the most sanctioned countries in the world. The width of the sanctions regime against the country is mirrored by the mere fact that it was targeted by all the UN, US and EU. Moreover, it is levied due to a wide range of reasons. Specifically high attraction drew the sanctions imposed by the UN between 2006 and 2015 due to the country's nuclear program and offenses against the Non-Proliferation Treaty. Since the US withdrew from the agreement lifting many sanctions in 2018, Iran is again heavily affected by US (secondary) sanctions. Other sanctions, for example some of the EU, relate to human right breaches in Iran and its support of Russia's war efforts in Ukraine. The sanctions regime against Iran is thereby complex and versatile, but remains vivid. It impacts the country's vital oil exports and shipping industry on a massive scale, so that maintaining a shadow fleet has become an essential part of Iranian sanctions circumvention.

=== Sanctions impact ===
The UN Security Council Resolution 1929 from 2010 clamps down remarkably on the Iranian maritime sphere and tightened earlier rounds of sanctions from 2006 insofar as it for example allowed inspections of vessels suspected to carry cargo related to prohibited activities also on the high seas and not only in the territorial waters of member states. Furthermore, it narrowed down the possibility of having any commercial interaction with Iranian ships and oil tankers. The funds and assets of the Islamic Republic of Iran Shipping Lines (IRISL) were frozen and servicing of Iranian vessels inhibited. Because Iran's capacity to act was restrained under these circumstances and regimes like the Iranian one are dependent on the circumvention of sanctions, a shadow fleet would offer a way to keep the country's economy and weapons program alive, since specifically the latter is dependent on foreign supplies of certain critical and dual-use items. Although the UNSCR 1929's validity had run out in 2016 after the JCPOA, it exemplifies very well how sanctions have limited Iran's possibilities to operate in the maritime domain. Iran faces such hardships until today as other, similar, but unilateral sanctions stay in place. Perchance most importantly, however, maritime sanctions have restricted Iran's export of oil via the seaways. Since being a leading provider of crude to world markets and relying greatly on these exports for economic prosperity, Iran has been struck hard by such measures.

=== Incidents ===
The use of highly outdated ships comes not without risk as for example depicted by the lethal accident of the Sanchi. In this incident in January 2018 the Sanchi, a tanker owned by the National Iranian Tanker Company (NITC) and flagged by Panama, heading for South Korea, collided with the cargo ship CF Crystal in the East China Sea, leaving all 32 Sanchi crew members dead and causing rumors about the real destination of the ship, with some pointing at North Korea. Another of the latest displays of how shadow tankers transporting Iranian crude pose risks was the MT Pablo accident off the Malaysian coast in May 2023. Explosions and an outbreak of fire struck the ship, leaving three crew members missing. Returning from a delivery to China, it was a fortunate circumstance that the vessel carried no oil at the incident's happening, foreclosing a larger environmental catastrophe. The incidents have many of the characteristics typically associated with sea-based sanctions evasion: an old tanker, owned by shell companies, with changing names and flagged by states with poor rule enforcement capacities, that sailed with no effective insurance. In this situation, the remaining of the Pablo is for example unclear since in case of an incident the insurer is normally responsible for the removal and wreckage of a ship. The sanctions have, however, also banned the acquisition of insurance.

=== Circumvention practice ===
==== Insurance ====
Such a ban on shipping insurance, a Western-dominated market, for companies involved in Iranian oil and cargo trade, has hit Iran's ability to export goods and first and foremost oil noticeably. However, alternatives were quickly set up in and outside Iran to end the reliance on these insurers and to keep the oil trade somewhat functioning. Asian receiving nations of Iranian crude like China, India, Japan and South Korea (the latter two interestingly despite their steadfast alliance with the West) started to accept novel Iranian insurance for oil transports (e.g. "Moallem Insurance Company", or "Kish P&I"), introduced own state-backed insurance schemes or even applied both methods to enable ongoing shipments of Iranian crude to their countries.

==== Concealment efforts ====
Vessels carrying Iranian crude often employ many more shadowy techniques to conceal their real operations. A popular technique to stay undetected on the seas is to turn off the AIS as explained above. In the Sanchi case, it was reported that the AIS transmission was interrupted with no official or definite reason given for that. Other sources confirm that turning off transponders or transmitting fake communication signals are a common practice for Iranian sanctions evaders. There are cases, involving ships linked to Iran, in which AIS's had been switched off and even assumed by another ship (a practice called "spoofing"), whereby vessels sailed under a false identity. This AIS manipulation was then used to covertly conduct risky ship-to-ship transfers, another popular technique to implement sanctions evasion. It is commonly used technique among sanctions busters including Iran. Hence, Iran seems to apply the prevalent and widespread methods to conceal shipments as they are outlined above. Moreover, "Iranian oil traders have also used false documents in order to bypass sanctions by faking Iraqi documents to make it look that Iranian oil is Iraqi and then selling it to the world market. This method is used in conjunction with ship-to-ship transfers, where Iranian oil is transferred to foreign ships without docking in port". On the level of container-based cargo, Iran has in the meanwhile made use of the practice of expropriating colors and unique serial numbers (called the BIC code) of shipping containers of non-Iranian companies. Also the ownership of IRISL ships ownership was allegedly changed.

==== Foreign accomplices ====
While "an easy and less expensive method for Iran was to use its own tankers or rented vessels to transport petroleum to foreign destinations", ship-to-ship transfers often require facilitation through actors from abroad. There is a selection of such known cases: In one "Iran has used, and may continue to use, the port of Labuan in East Malaysia to avoid international sanctions by using middle-of-the-night ship-to-ship oil transfers to floating storage ships. Then, in a complex set of inter-company transfers, the oil is sold through multiple companies". In another, a Bahraini subsidiary of Vitol bought 2 million barrels of oil in a ship-to-ship transfer off the Malaysian port of Tanjung Pelepas. Interestingly, the Pablo incident occurred likewise in Malaysian waters, as these appear to be an hotspot for such ship-to-ship transfers. Lastly, Greek national and shipping businessman Dimitris Cambis was accused by US authorities of having "purchased at least eight oil tankers on Iran's behalf, took on Iranian oil through ship-to-ship transfers, and sold the oil to international customers who were unaware of the oil's origin".

Of utmost importance are of course the countries importing Iranian crude, of which China is the biggest buyer. There is even talk of a "maritime sleight of hand", "through which China could camouflage its oil imports from Iran by taking advantage of direct means, ship transfers, and third parties". Such third parties encompass a set of countries "from Iraq and Kuwait in the Middle East to Malaysia and Vietnam in Southeast Asia and from Russia and Kazakhstan in Central Asia to Sri Lanka and Bangladesh in South Asia", which "could essentially smooth the way for Chinese oil companies to falsely rebrand Iranian crude oil and ship it to somewhere in mainland China". However, cases like the Iranian crude carrying Pacific Bravo docking unhindered in Hong Kong in 2019 or the Bank of Kunlun provenly facilitating direct business between China and Iran show also a in part blatantly ignorant side of Beijing in respect to sanctions against Iran.

It stands out that Iran often evades sanctions in cooperation with countries that have likewise strained relations with the West, smaller ones that seek bare revenue or with states that putatively aspire to maneuver the world towards a more multipolar order. Worthy of remark is for example not only Iran's (maritime) cooperation with China, but also with other sanctioned entities like Russia and Venezuela. The watchdog NGO "United Against Nuclear Iran" speaks for instance of the "Maduro-Khamenei Oil Alliance" . India, which values an independent foreign policy, also from the West, but without being in conflict with it, agreed with Iran to develop Chabahar Port.

==== Flagging ====
It would be wrong to assume that all vessels transporting Iranian cargo are also flagged by Iran. UANI lists hundreds of ships that are suspected of involvement in the transfer of Iranian crude, calling it "The Ghost Armada". Under the most common flag states for Iran are Panama as the by far most important, followed by the likes of Vietnam, Cameroon, the Comoros, the Cook Islands, Gabon, Hong Kong and Liberia. UANI is also said to play an important role of exposing these ships to known stakeholders, advocating to stop doing business with them and demanding that they are de-flagged, which in fact regularly happens. However, Iran engages pertinently in reflagging, so that the seek and hide is very dynamic in this domain. Iran flies foreign flags also fraudulently, for example that of Guyana.

==== Financials ====
Besides Bank of Kunlun, another remarkable bank that is seen to help Iran circumvent sanctions is Turkish state-controlled Halkbank. Still, Iran's ability to participate in world markets has been limited, because it may have received payments in Lira, Renminbi or Rupees, but not in US Dollars, the primary currency of international trade, to which Iranians continually have had no access due to financial sanctions. To receive payments for sanctioned exports it is therefore reported that Iran fell back on unconventional methods like using the regional Hawala system and bartering. Whatsoever, gold seems to play special role in how Iran circumvents the Western controlled access to hard currency. Energy resources are exchanged for gold or gold is purchased in local currencies: A specifically popular way to receive hard currencies led apparently via Turkey, where gold could be bought for Lira and then be flown out to Dubai. Dubai generally, as a commercial hub, offshore financial center, port city and because of its geographical proximity, has traditionally represented a welcomed opportunity to make use of in sanction evasion processes for Iran. In the UAE, due to lax regulation, the gold could easily be sold for Dollars. Then, "with over 8,000 Iranian-owned businesses operating out of Dubai and over 200 ships leaving daily for Iran, almost anything that can be brought into Dubai can be clandestinely shipped out again to Iran". However, US pressure on UAE-based Iran-related operations allegedly also caused a shift to Turkish and Southeast Asian ports for transshipments.

On the individual level, noteworthy links are found a Turkish-Iranian businessman called Reza Zarrab, found to be a key person behind a gas-for-gold scheme between Turkey and Iran. Another notable person in this context is Babak Zanjani, who "in order to help the Iranian government export more cargoes of its sanctioned oil […] had basically taken advantage of a network of more than 60 businesses registered in the UAE, Turkey, and Malaysia. To sell more crude oil, he had managed to conceal the source of Iranian oil", making it possible to broker it. This points at the importance of front companies for the Iranian shadow fleet: "In the transport sector, the murky nature of the shipping industry makes the tracing of suspicious goods and ships difficult. Iran's use of hitherto unknown companies typically does not raise any eyebrows in the shipping business, unlike in the financial sector, where suspicious front companies are apt to be picked up immediately".The Iranian Revolutionary Guard Corps (IRGC) for example set up the "Mehdi Group" in India that handled vessels and financials, paving "the way for Iran's informal oil business with other nations, including China".

== Role of Western states ==
=== Context ===
The EU and US have for a long time imposed economic sanctions upon various countries' maritime trade. Such sanctions began with measures employed against North Korea, Venezuela and Iran, and have since grown to include Russia following the country's invasion of Ukraine in early 2022. These sanctions have led to a huge rise in the use of shadow fleets as a vehicle to circumnavigate sanctions.

=== Russian sanctions ===
Shortly after the Russian invasion of Ukraine in early 2022, the US completely banned imports of oil. The EU followed by reducing purchases of the resource from originally 45% of Russia's oil to just 5%. As part of their sanctions, the EU and G7 together imposed a price cap of US$60 per barrel on Russian maritime-transported oil. A price cap was seen by many as a way to play both sides; stabilise global oil prices; and limit Russia's revenues that would be directed to their military operations.

=== Enforcement of sanctions ===
There are several reasons why it is difficult for Western countries to enforce these sanctions and ensure the measures have their desired impact. Firstly, the willingness of the US and EU to enforce these sanctions is made difficult by conflicting interests and consequences regarding sanction-busting activities. As Stockbruegger identifies, "Western leaders have reasons to ensure Russian oil continues to flow". To find this balance between the two outcomes, officials meet regularly to ensure the price cap remains "at least 5% below the average market price". The West's desire to stabilise global oil prices has directly increased Russian revenue, with the US encouraging companies to invest and engage back into the Russian oil industry in various forms, both to "keep supplies stable and to regain some oversight of Moscow's exports". Secondly, despite the EU initially being the largest importer of Russian oil and the resultant fall in demand, Russia has been able to find more pockets of demand for its resource, with China and India replacing the EU as the largest buyers. Thirdly, despite its barrels selling for $35–45 to non-Western countries, Russia recoups around $80, inferring high shipping, insurance and logistics costs, all of which are captured by Russian operators. This is due to the mass exodus of the Western companies which formerly provided these services. As a result, despite initial revenue falls of 60%, Russian oil and gas revenues have rebounded in 2024 to almost double that of the year before.

== Associated risks ==
In addition to generating geopolitical challenges and political risks, shadow fleets present additional secondary risks to the environment, human security, maritime safety of both personnel and vessels, as well as commercial and economic interests.

=== Commercial shipping risks ===
==== Compliance and due diligence ====
Commercial shipping risks refers to the economic and legal penalties faced by private shipping companies who may unwittingly participate in sanction busting at sea, or pay the costs of accidents created by shadow vessels. When shell companies, identity laundering strategies and insurance fraud are used, stakeholders – including banks and shipping companies – may become liable to civil penalties. This creates high compliance and due diligence requirements.

This has resulted in a turn towards the industry for tasks of surveillance, self-policing and enforcement – such as monitoring AIS switch-off or flag changes. The incentives and civil penalties put forward have led to higher costs for companies.

==== Insurance and losses ====
Given that shadow tankers operate without Western insurance, they create financial problems for the countries in whose waters accidents may happen. Then, to pay for the damages, fixing the issues requires to use government money or the insurance of another vessel. This is risk intertwined with environmental risks. For instance, due to the lack of insurance and unknown owners of these ships, oil spills in Finnish waters will have to be paid by Finnish authorities and their taxpayers. This is a serious issue especially given that "almost three quarters of all seaborne Russian crude flows traveled without western insurance in August" 2023. It has been identified for "some four dozen incidents involving suspected shadow vessels have already taken place", with calamities such as fires, engine failures, collisions, loss of steerage and oil spills.

==== Safety on board ====
The shadow fleets have negative effects which put in danger the safety of personnel and material on board these old and poorly maintained ships. The cases of the MT Pablo and Sanchi show how seafarers can be harmed when sailing on dark ships. Reportedly, in the case of MT Pablo the crew were not aware of its role as a shadow fleet ship. An abandoned, floating wreck like that of the MT Pablo is in the meantime hazardous to marine traffic. Furthermore, shadow fleet ships frequently bypass international regulations, such as those established by the International Maritime Organization (IMO) and the SOLAS convention. This non-compliance heightens risks to both seafarers and the environment, as substandard equipment and poor maintenance practices increase the likelihood of accidents and spills. These risks underscore the need for stronger enforcement of global maritime safety standards.

=== Environmental risks ===
The collision of ships carrying oil, or spilling of oil, poses major environmental risk to the surrounding waters and ecosystems. There are several factors that increase the risk of these ship accidents that are true for shadow fleet vehicles. These include:

- the age of the vehicles, often older than 20 years
- the lack of regulation of many of the flags of convenience of the ships
- a general state of poor repair and conditions of these ships, to the point where they otherwise would have been recycled
- Risky ship-to-ship oil transfers
- Vehicles being refused guidance and help in directing through dangerous, challenging waters
- A lack of regular maintenance

Analyses have determined that in 2022 there have been at least eight groundings, collisions, or near misses that involved tankers carrying sanctioned crude or oil products, which represents the same number as the three previous years combined. These kinds of events have potential catastrophic consequences for the marine environment, crews, and other transporters, bringing financial harm that has to be covered by other governments or insurers.

Coastal communities are also vulnerable to the potential of an oil leakage leading to serious pollution and consequential economic hardship (loss of revenues from fisheries, tourism, etc.).

==== Environmental catastrophe risk in South America ====
The use of shadow fleet vessels in crude oil trading is particularly concerning due to the potential for large oil spills. These ships, which frequently operate on the shores of heavily sanctioned countries like Venezuela and Cuba, are not only poorly maintained but also often fail to meet regulatory standards. The presence of such vessels increases the likelihood of environmental catastrophes, which could have devastating impacts on marine and coastal ecosystems in the region.

The heavily sanctioned continent of South America has a notable presence of shadow vessels operating along its shores. These ships are integral to the evasion strategies employed by countries like Venezuela and Cuba to continue their oil trade despite international restrictions. These vessels, due to their secrecy and poor maintenance, present ongoing risks not only to the environment but also to maritime safety

=== Human security risks ===
==== On-shore health risks ====
Sanctions have a profound impact on the economies of the affected countries, often exacerbating existing hardships. Sanctions against Venezuela have significantly affected the population's well-being, reducing caloric intake, increasing disease and mortality rates, and forcing thousands of citizens to flee the country. The reliance on shadow fleet vessels for oil trade, while necessary for sustaining economic interests under sanctions, further complicates these issues by diverting resources away from essential public services and infrastructure.

Coastal communities also bear the sanitary costs of potential oil spillages generated by shadow tankers.

==== Humanitarian impacts ====
Economic sanctions, especially when comprehensive and broad, have faced criticism for their potential role in restricting populations access to resources while the elite is enriched by the continued trade of luxury goods and critical resources, while not achieving the political objectives they set out to create.

This criticism is embedded in a wider debate about western hegemony and the right of the international community to impose sanctions and economic hardships on so-called "rogue" states and their populations.

== See also ==
- Chinese shadow fleet
- Iranian shadow fleet
- Russian shadow fleet
- Venezuela–Iran ghost flights
- Venezuelan shadow fleet
