= Oil smuggling in Iran =

Oil smuggling in Iran is driven by factors like international sanctions on Iranian crude and steep fuel price differences with neighboring countries. These conditions have spawned a thriving illicit trade in both crude oil and refined fuels. Smuggling operations range from small-scale overland fuel trafficking to sophisticated global schemes involving tanker fleets. Oil smuggling has economic impacts and geopolitical implications.

== Recent trends and statistics ==
Despite U.S. sanctions, Iran's crude oil exports have surged in 2022–2023, largely through covert channels. Estimates by the U.S. Energy Information Administration (EIA) indicate Iran earned about $53–54 billion annually from oil exports in 2022 and 2023.

Volume-wise, Iran's exports averaged roughly 1.4 million barrels per day in 2023, the highest since 2018. United Against Nuclear Iran (UANI), a monitoring group, tracked 533 million barrels exported in 2023, up 27% from 420 million in 2022.

China is the dominant buyer (over 80% of Iran's oil), with other shipments going to Syria, the UAE, and Venezuela. This booming shadow oil trade reflects a marked increase in smuggling of sanctioned Iranian oil in 2023–2024.

At the same time Iran faces rampant smuggling of subsidized fuels (like gasoline and diesel) out of the country. Iranian officials acknowledge a sharp rise in this illicit flow. In late 2024, an Iranian presidential official stated that 20–30 million liters of fuel are smuggled out of Iran every day, calling it an economic "catastrophe".

Earlier in 2024, a member of Iran's Chamber of Commerce estimated 12 million liters of fuel leave Iran daily, worth about $4 billion per year (with about $3.5 billion being pure profit for smugglers). This represents a huge volume .

For perspective, 12–30 million liters is equivalent to roughly 75,000–190,000 barrels of fuel per day. Such smuggling creates a gap between reported domestic fuel production and actual consumption. For example, Iran's domestic gasoline consumption averaged 124 million liters per day in 2023, but spiked to a record 144 million liters on one day in March 2025, a demand surge partly attributed to cross-border smuggling driven by cheap prices.

Overall, officials estimate over $3 billion of fuel subsidies are lost annually to smuggling, straining Iran's economy.

In a press conference on March 24, 2025, Iraq’s Oil Minister, Hayan Abdul Ghani, accused Iran of using fake Iraqi documents to smuggle oil and evade international sanctions. These forgeries came to light after oil tankers were seized by the U.S. Navy in the Persian Gulf. The shipping documents were identified as counterfeit, and the Iranian oil minister denied these accusations.

Reuters reported in December 2024 that a complex oil-smuggling network in Iraq could generate more than one billion dollars annually for Iran. The methods used by this smuggling network include blending Iranian and Iraqi oil and selling it on international markets as pure Iraqi oil, or reselling oil that is heavily subsidized by the Iraqi government and intended for Iraqi industries. Iraq is reluctant to confront this smuggling because its leaders, including current Prime Minister Mohammed Shia’ al-Sudani, are heavily dependent on the support of Iran-backed Shiite militia groups, which play a key role in the smuggling operations.

== Methods and routes of smuggling ==
Oil and fuel smuggling in Iran occurs via multiple methods and routes, spanning land borders, maritime paths, and even illicit pipeline connections. Smugglers have developed ingenious techniques to move oil covertly:

=== Land routes ===
Porous land borders enable large-scale fuel smuggling via trucks and other vehicles. Every day, thousands of fuel tankers and pickup trucks ferry Iranian diesel and gasoline into neighboring countries like Pakistan, Afghanistan, and Iraq. For instance, Pakistani officials report that around 2,000 vehicles transport Iranian fuel into Pakistan daily, making up as much as 35% of Pakistan's diesel supply.

Smugglers exploit steep price gaps: Iran's heavily subsidized fuel (diesel at ~$0.12 per liter) is far cheaper than in Afghanistan or Pakistan (where prices exceed $1 per liter). This creates a strong incentive to buy fuel cheaply in Iran and run it across borders for resale.

Common land routes include the southeast border with Pakistan (through Sistan-Baluchestan into Pakistani Balochistan) and routes into Afghanistan's western provinces. Smugglers in these areas often operate in convoys, and the scale is so large that in Pakistan's Balochistan province an estimated 2.4 million people depend on the smuggled-fuel trade for livelihood.

Smaller-scale smuggling also occurs westward into Iraq and Turkey. For example, Iranian diesel is trucked into eastern Turkey (Van province) where it is bartered for goods. In Iran's northwest Kurdish regions, tankers have illicitly carried crude oil from Iraq's Kurdistan region into Iran to evade Iraqi federal controls, especially after a pipeline closure in 2023.

=== Sea routes (ghost tankers) ===
A significant portion of Iranian crude oil is smuggled via the sea using a "ghost fleet" of aging oil tankers that operate covertly.

An aging oil tanker with a foreign flag, similar to those in Iran's "ghost fleet" used to covertly ship sanctioned oil. Iran has developed elaborate maritime tactics to hide the origin of its oil. Tankers linked to Iran routinely disable transponders (AIS tracking), conduct ship-to-ship transfers in open waters, and even forge documents and repaint vessels to assume false identities.

Leaked emails from an Iranian shipping network (code-named "Sahara Thunder") revealed instructions to avoid any Iranian markings and to obtain fake certificates of origin to pass off Iranian crude as originating elsewhere. This shadow fleet has grown rapidly. UANI identified over 477 tankers involved in Iranian oil smuggling by late 2024, with 132 new vessels added that year alone.

These ships often fly flags of convenience (Panama, Tanzania, etc.) and frequently change names. They carry out complex voyages: for example, Iranian crude is sometimes first shipped to Malaysia or the UAE, blended or rebranded, and then re-exported to buyers in China (by far the largest customer).

Smaller ships shuttle between Iran and hubs where oil is offloaded to bigger tankers for long-distance transport. In one documented scheme, a large tanker acted as an offshore collection point in the Persian Gulf, from which oil was siphoned to other vessels over 60 separate transfers to reach end buyers. Smugglers have even repainted ships' names (e.g., a tanker "Remy" operating under the fake name "Deep Ocean") to avoid detection. Aside from crude oil, Iran also covertly exports refined fuel oil (e.g. mazut) by sea. Around 230,000 barrels per day of fuel oil on average during recent years, often to Asia.

== Pipeline and fixed Infrastructure ==
While less common than road or sea smuggling, authorities have uncovered illicit pipelines and tapping operations used to steal or move fuel. In Iran's southern Hormozgan province (a smuggling hotspot), police discovered a hidden 700-meter pipeline on Qeshm Island in 2023 that was being used to transfer fuel from the shore to small vessels for smuggling.

Another clandestine pipeline was found in the Bandar Abbas area, indicating organized efforts to siphon fuel and bypass road checkpoints. Smugglers have tapped into official oil infrastructure as well for instance, by illicitly drawing fuel from transit pipelines or storage tanks in border regions. In the Kurdistan border area, some reports suggest pipeline taps or direct hose connections have been used to quickly load smuggled crude across the Iran-Iraq border. These methods, though riskier, allow moving large quantities out of sight. Additionally, some official pipelines and swaps have been exploited for gray-market dealings (e.g. oil sent from Iraq into Iran for "refining" but then sold). Overall, pipeline-based smuggling is a smaller component, but it underscores the creativity of smuggling networks in exploiting infrastructure.

In June 2025, Panama delisted approximately 650 vessels from its registry after identifying that nearly 17 percent of ships suspected of carrying Iranian crude were exploiting Panama's flag-of-convenience system. According to the United Against Nuclear Iran (UANI), these vessels have been using tactics like "flag-hopping" falsified ownership documents, and disabling tracking systems to evade international sanctions. UANI warned that Panama's registry was being misused as a loophole undermining global sanctions efforts and posing serious threats to regional and U.S. security.

== Actors and networks involved ==
=== Domestic actors ===
Within Iran, a mix of actors, from poor individual fuel carriers to powerful officials, play roles in oil smuggling. On the low end, thousands of ordinary Iranians in border provinces engage in fuel smuggling as a means of survival amid poverty and high unemployment. These "sookhtbar" (fuel carriers) drive pickups or motorcycles laden with jerrycans of gasoline/diesel across remote border points. Many have perilous livelihoods, facing accidents or shootings as they haul fuel on back roads.

However, the sheer scale of smuggling (tens of millions of liters daily) suggests involvement by well-organized networks. Iran's Islamic Revolutionary Guard Corps (IRGC) has been repeatedly implicated at the center of large-scale fuel smuggling operations. A January 2022 investigative report indicated the IRGC was coordinating major fuel smuggling rings, leveraging its control over border security and oil depots.

Iranian officials have tacitly acknowledged corruption and collusion; even a state newspaper admitted some government insiders may facilitate smuggling.

The IRGC or associated firms are believed to divert subsidized fuel to the black market, using convoys of tanker trucks that ordinary people could not operate unchecked.

In the sanctioned crude oil trade, state-run entities like the National Iranian Oil Company (NIOC) and shadow companies (e.g. the Tehran-based Sahara Thunder firm) manage the logistics. These entities often act as fronts for the government or IRGC, arranging deals with foreign buyers and contracting the "ghost" tankers.

=== International networks ===
Oil smuggling from Iran extends beyond its borders, involving transnational networks and foreign facilitators. On the receiving end, foreign buyers and intermediaries knowingly purchase Iranian oil at a discount. For example, a number of small independent Chinese refineries ("teapots") became major buyers of Iran's sanctioned crude, attracted by discounts of $10–30 per barrel.

These buyers often work through brokers in the UAE, Malaysia, or Singapore who help obscure the oil's origin. A fleet of international shipping companies, often registered in countries like Panama, Marshall Islands, or Hong Kong, form the backbone of the maritime smuggling, providing the tankers and falsifying paperwork. Some ships are owned by shell companies linked to Iran, while others are simply paid lucratively to take the risk. Intelligence monitors have noted that hundreds of foreign-flagged tankers now participate in carrying Iranian oil in violation of sanctions.

In addition, regional smuggling networks play a role, especially for refined fuels. In Pakistan and Afghanistan, local syndicates and even insurgent groups profit from distributing Iranian fuel. A leaked Pakistani intelligence report in 2024 revealed that smuggling on the Iran-Pakistan border is highly organized, with entire communities and businesses integrated into the supply chain.

This network was so entrenched that Pakistani authorities feared a crackdown could destabilize Balochistan's economy. In the Middle East, Iran's allied militia groups also benefit: a recent investigation found the Iraqi militia Asaib Ahl al-Haq (AAH) was central to a scheme diverting Iraqi fuel oil, which was then sold abroad to generate about $1 billion a year for Iran and its proxies.

That operation involved companies and individuals across Iraq, Iran, and the Gulf states working together to smuggle heavy fuel oil to Asia.

== Iranian government's response and enforcement ==
The Iranian government publicly condemns fuel smuggling and has taken a mix of enforcement, legal, and administrative actions to combat it. Enforcement operations have increased, especially by the IRGC Navy and border guards. Iranian authorities frequently tout seizures of smuggled fuel and arrests of smugglers.

Such raids in the Gulf (often targeting dhow boats or small tankers heading toward the UAE or Oman) are regularly announced in Iranian media. On land, police and border patrols claim to confiscate thousands of liters of fuel from smugglers and to discover illicit pipeline taps. For example, authorities in Hormozgan dismantled a hidden pipeline used for diesel theft in late 2023.

The government has also increased patrols at border crossings and set up checkpoints on key highways in an attempt to catch fuel tankers carrying more than allowed. These enforcement actions, while notable, likely intercept only a fraction of the total smuggled volume.

=== Legal and administrative measures ===
Iran has tried to tighten control over fuel distribution to curb leakage. A fuel rationing smart card system was reintroduced (after nationwide protests in 2019 when fuel prices were hiked). Each vehicle has a quota of subsidized fuel; buying more requires paying a higher price. This aims to limit the surplus fuel available for smugglers to purchase cheaply. In 2023–2024, officials have announced plans for "smart monitoring" of the oil supply chain using digital tracking. In February 2025, the National Iranian Oil Refining and Distribution Company unveiled a real-time monitoring system leveraging IoT and AI to track fuel from refineries to gas stations. The goal is to detect abnormal flows and theft, thereby closing off smuggling loopholes. Technological measures like marking fuels with chemical tracers or using GPS on fuel trucks have also been discussed.

Top leaders have publicly acknowledged the problem's severity, which indicates political will (at least rhetorically) to address it. In December 2024, Iran's President (in a rare admission) called the daily smuggling of tens of millions of liters "unacceptable" and questioned how such theft occurs when production and distribution are state-controlled.

This kind of high-level statement suggests the government might pursue stricter oversight of agencies implicated in smuggling. Iran has even signaled willingness to cooperate regionally. For instance, coordinating with Pakistan's security forces who launched an anti-smuggling crackdown in 2023.

However, observers note that enforcement is inconsistent: while low-level smugglers are often targeted, enforcement can be lax or selectively applied if powerful groups (like the IRGC or local elites) are involved.

== Impact on Iran's economy ==
Oil smuggling exacts an economic toll on Iran, both directly and indirectly.

=== Lost revenues and subsidy costs ===
When crude oil is sold under the radar to evade sanctions, Iran often must offer steep discounts and rely on intermediaries, meaning Iran earns less per barrel than it would through official sales. By one estimate, Iran gives buyers a discount of $10–20 per barrel on sanction-evading oil, which over volumes of hundreds of millions of barrels can amount to billions in foregone revenue.

Additionally, some proceeds from covert oil sales are not repatriated in cash due to sanctions. Instead, Iran may receive payments in kind or deposit funds in restricted accounts, limiting the economic benefit. On the domestic front, the smuggling of subsidized fuel is a direct drain on Iran's budget. Iran provides some of the world's cheapest petrol and diesel to its population as a product of government subsidies and a weak currency. When up to 20% of Iran's daily fuel production is siphoned out by smugglers.

The government is essentially underwriting the consumption of neighboring countries. The Iranian Chamber of Commerce estimated an annual loss of $3–4 billion due to fuel smuggling, in terms of the subsidy value leaving the country. That is money the state pays to keep fuel cheap, which never benefits Iranian citizens or industry. This also translates to lost tax revenue, since black-market fuel exports are untaxed (Pakistan's government, for example, loses an estimated $800+ million in taxes because of Iranian fuel flooding its market.

=== Strain on domestic markets ===
Smuggling disrupts Iran's domestic fuel supply and can cause local shortages. The diversion of millions of liters per day means less fuel is available for legal consumption, forcing Iran to occasionally import gasoline despite being an oil producer. In 2023, as usage soared, Iran began buying foreign petrol to meet demand. Officials largely attributed the oil shortage to cross-border smuggling a problem which has been exacerbated in recent years because of heavily subsidized prices that have encouraged smuggling across the borders.

This is a reversal from a few years prior when Iran was self-sufficient or even an exporter of some refined fuels. Smuggling also distorts the domestic market: it encourages theft and corruption along the supply chain, and legitimate gas stations near border regions may face shortages or engage in black-market sales. Iranian industries and farmers have complained about fuel scarcity at subsidized rates because smugglers divert supplies for export.

Furthermore, the government's attempt to curb smuggling by rationing fuel has social costs; past fuel price hikes to reduce subsidy losses (such as in November 2019) triggered widespread protests and inflation. Thus, the regime is in a bind, cracking down by raising prices would save money and reduce incentive to smuggle, but it risks public backlash. Meanwhile, cheap smuggled fuel benefits foreign consumers at Iran's expense: for example, Pakistani truckers enjoy lower-cost Iranian diesel, effectively a transfer of value from Iranian taxpayers to Pakistanis.

== Geopolitical implications ==
Oil smuggling in Iran has geopolitical dimensions, intertwining with sanctions policy, regional relations, and international trade dynamics:

=== Sanctions evasion and US-Iran tensions ===
The clandestine export of Iranian oil directly undercuts U.S. led sanctions aimed at pressuring Tehran. Iran's success in moving over a million barrels a day out of the country has diluted the impact of the "maximum pressure" campaign.

This has become a point of contention in international diplomacy. For instance, U.S. officials have at times tightened enforcement, leading to high-seas confrontations. In 2023, the U.S. Navy and Department of Justice seized several cargoes of Iranian oil (notably the case of the tanker Suez Rajan) which were being smuggled to Asia, provoking anger in Tehran. Iran retaliated by harassing or briefly seizing commercial tankers in the Persian Gulf region, raising security risks for global shipping. The smuggling thus contributes to a "tanker war" atmosphere in the Gulf, where Iranian forces and Western navies play cat-and-mouse. Moreover, as sanctions are anticipated to tighten again (e.g., with a potential change in U.S. administration), Iran's heavy reliance on smuggling could invite even more aggressive interdiction efforts by Western countries. This dynamic affects global oil markets – enforcement of sanctions tends to reduce Iran's covert exports (as seen in late 2024 when Iranian exports dipped below 1.3 million barrels/day on news of renewed U.S. pressure), which can tighten supply and raise prices. Conversely, lenient enforcement allows more Iranian oil into the market, influencing global oil price calculations and OPEC+ output decisions.

In February 2026, in the fallout of the 2025-2026 Iranian protests and 2026 Iran massacres, the US imposed new sanctions on 30 individuals, companies, and vessels connected with Iran, escalating economic pressure before the next round of the 2025–2026 Iran–United States negotiations.

=== Financing of regional allies and conflicts ===
Smuggling provides Tehran with resources to fund its regional allies and proxy forces, impacting Middle East security. Much of the revenue from Iran's off-the-books oil sales is funneled into supporting groups like the IRGC's Quds Force, Hezbollah, Syrian President Bashar al-Assad's regime, and Iraqi Shi'ite militias.

For example, Hezbollah's financing has partly relied on cheap Iranian fuel (there were reports of sanctioned Iranian fuel shipped to Lebanon via Syria in 2021). In Syria, Iran's stealth oil deliveries (about 50,000 barrels/day to Syria's coast) kept the Assad government running during the civil war.

Iran's opponents argue that by skirting sanctions and selling oil, Tehran sustains a revenue stream for disruptive regional activities. Additionally, the sophisticated fuel oil smuggling network in Iraq (involving militias like AAH) has strengthened Iran-aligned factions in Iraq by giving them independent income. This can shift power balances in Baghdad and complicate U.S.-Iraq relations. The Gulf States have mixed reactions: some, like the UAE, have been transit points for Iranian oil (with reports of Iranian crude being rebranded as other origin and sold in the Gulf), which creates quiet economic ties between Iran and its Arab neighbors. But at the same time, Gulf countries and Israel view Iran's sanction-busting as enabling Tehran's regional militancy. Smuggled Iranian oil also found its way to Venezuela (Iran swapped condensate for Venezuelan crude, helping both sanctioned nations), highlighting an axis of sanctioned states cooperating – a geopolitical alliance forged through oil trade.

=== Impact on international trade and diplomacy ===
Iran's oil smuggling has forced changes in international maritime practices and diplomatic engagements. The use of fraudulent shipping documents and AIS spoofing by Iranian tankers has drawn global regulatory scrutiny – organizations like the International Maritime Organization (IMO) have discussed stricter rules on AIS manipulation because of this issue. Countries like Panama and Tanzania, whose flags were frequently used by Iran's ghost fleet, have been pressured by the U.S. to de-flag vessels involved in sanction evasion.

In 2023, over 300 merchant ships lost their flag registrations due to links with Iranian oil trade, which is an unusual intersection of geopolitics and maritime law. Smuggling has also been a diplomatic topic between Iran and its neighbors. Iran has periodically negotiated with Pakistan to formalize some fuel trade (e.g., proposing legal border markets or bartering fuel for goods) in order to curtail illegal smuggling and improve bilateral economic ties – however, such efforts have had limited success. Within OPEC, Iran's undeclared exports complicate quota systems and relations with countries like Saudi Arabia, which cut their own output in 2023 partly to stabilize the market while Iran's hidden exports rose.

=== Regional hotspots of smuggling activity ===
Certain regions and border areas in Iran have become notorious hubs for oil and fuel smuggling due to geography and economic conditions. The following are key hotspots:

Sistan and Baluchestan (Iran's southeast border): This impoverished province bordering Pakistan and Afghanistan is a major conduit for fuel smuggling. Thousands of liters of diesel and gasoline are hauled daily across the border near Zahedan, Mirjaveh, and other crossing points into Pakistan's Balochistan.

Smuggling here is driven by extreme price differences and the local population's need for income. Long convoys of pickup trucks carrying plastic barrels of fuel are a common sight on dirt roads leading east. The Iran-Afghanistan border (e.g. through Sistan region towards Nimruz, Afghanistan) also sees significant outflows of Iranian fuel. Officials have cited Sistan and Baluchestan as one of the provinces most affected by fuel smuggling networks.

Khuzestan Province (southwest Iran, Iraq border): Khuzestan, Iran's main oil-producing region, has porous borders with southern Iraq (Basra province) and a coastline on the northern Persian Gulf. It has long been a route for smuggling oil products. Diesel and other refined fuels are often trucked across the border into Iraq or to ports on the Shatt al-Arab waterway. Smuggling rings tap into the region's oil infrastructure – there have been cases of illegal taps on pipelines near Abadan and Arvand to siphon fuel. The province's proximity to Iraq, where fuel prices are higher, makes it lucrative for smugglers. Iranian officials specifically list Khuzestan among provinces hit hardest by fuel smuggling.

Kurdish Border (west and northwest Iran): The western border regions, including parts of Kermanshah, Kurdistan, and West Azerbaijan provinces, are active smuggling corridors. Here, the smuggling is two-way: Iranian refined fuel is smuggled out to Iraq (Kurdistan region), and at times crude oil from Iraqi Kurdistan is smuggled into Iran. After the halting of the official Iraq-Turkey pipeline in 2023, an estimated 200,000 barrels per day of Kurdish crude started being trucked through informal routes, much of it into Iran for refining or export.

Border crossings like Bashmakh and Parvez Khan see heavy truck traffic that exceeds documented trade, indicating oil/fuel smuggling. The terrain, a terrain with rugged mountains, has also made it historically a smuggler's haven (locals refer to small-time carriers as "kolbar" for carrying goods on foot, including fuel). Iranian Kurdistan's adjacency to both Iraq's KRG and Turkey means smuggled Iranian fuel can end up in eastern Turkey as well. Indeed, Iranian authorities have pointed to routes leading to Turkey's Van province for diesel smuggling. The Kurdish border area thus remains a critical (if under-reported) hotspot for oil moving illicitly in or out of Iran.

Eastern Border with Afghanistan: Iran's eastern frontier with Afghanistan (beyond Sistan-Baluchestan up through South Khorasan province) is another zone of fuel smuggling. Afghanistan, especially under the Taliban government, has high demand for fuel and limited refining capacity, so cheap Iranian petrol and diesel are in demand. Smugglers transport fuel by tanker trucks or even by modifying cars with extra fuel tanks to sneak across at crossings like Islam Qala (Herat) and Zaranj (Nimruz). Afghan cities near Iran have reported plentiful Iranian fuel on sale, confirming these routes. While exact volumes are uncertain, Afghan-bound smuggling likely accounts for a portion of the 20–30 million liters leaving Iran daily. Iranian officials have cited Afghanistan as a common destination for smuggled diesel.

== Oil smuggling and the IRGC ==
Western security officials and Iranian insiders report that the IRGC now controls up to 50% of all oil leaving Iran. In practical terms, the IRGC has extended its control on the oil sector, from overseeing a fleet of secret tankers to running front companies that sell crude abroad.

The IRGC's Quds Force, its external operations wing, was even allotted oil cargoes by the Iranian state (instead of cash) as early as 2013, reflecting a policy decision to let the IRGC earn its budget through oil sales.

According to a former U.S. official, when sanctions were reimposed and the National Iranian Oil Company (NIOC) struggled with legal sales, IRGC operatives, adept at smuggling, stepped in to move oil clandestinely. Today, the IRGC's dominance in oil smuggling is unprecedented. IRGC-linked networks reportedly handle everything from securing crude supply to arranging transport and payment through opaque channels.

This "shadow economy" directly enriches the IRGC. Oil revenues are now often split between the official oil company and the IRGC's channels; one source indicated export earnings are roughly divided evenly between NIOC's trading arm and the IRGC's networks. The IRGC sells oil at a discount (several dollars per barrel lower) compared to official Iranian oil, compensating buyers for the legal risk of dealing with a U.S. designated terrorist organization.

Through these sanctions-busting sales, the IRGC has generated substantial income that funds its operations and proxy forces. Intelligence indicates that millions of dollars flowed to Quds Force ventures and allied militias like Hezbollah via these oil deals.

== Oil smuggling, corruption and the IRGC ==
Oil constitutes approximately 55%-57% of Iran's export revenues. The need to smuggle oil to bypass the international sanction have led to sharp increase in corruption. Indeed, Iran has deteriorated in the Corruption Perception Index from the 138th place to the 151st place in 2024, and also in the World Bank's Worldwide Governance Indicators from a score of 33.42/100 in 2018 to 29.75/100 in 2024.

Much of the corruption is performed by the IRGC and its economic affiliates. In 2023 alone, the IRGC controlled 40–50% of Iran’s oil exports. with a worth of $25–30 billion, via its unofficial networks. The intake of fund by the IRGC drains state revenue, reducing funds available for infrastructure, education, and healthcare. Former customs officials and even members of Iran’s Chamber of Commerce have openly acknowledged this issue. For example, in 2022, Masoud Karbasian, a former Minister of Economy, stated that “the country’s largest smuggling operations are conducted by institutions we are not allowed to name” — an unmistakable reference to the IRGC.

IRGC involvement in the oil industry also translates into a huge gasoline revenues theft that drains Iran from $4 billion revenues.

Iran oil export is conducted through trust networks, which often operate through companies in countries such as the United Arab Emirates, Turkey, and Oman, and function as intermediaries in oil exports and revenue transfers, enabling Iran to continue generating income despite restrictions on formal banking and trade. Over the past two decades nearly 100 individuals or trust entities have managed to accumulate around 50 billion dollars in profits, profits are described as systematic corrupt rents. The consequences of the systematic corruption on inequality are alarming with 1% holding one third of the economy. The corruption and inefficiencies also have contributed significantly to the energy crisis in Iran, depleting oil reserves for the people.

The corruption that encompassed the oil industry as well as the entire Iranian economy, is not a bug but rather a feature. The regime uses corruption to reward the elites that are responsible for its preservation. For example, on 13 March, Gholamhossein Mohseni Ejei, head of Iran’s judiciary, stated in an interview with the state-run Shabakeye Khabar (News Network): "They say a pipeline has been extended from the airport to the sea for smuggling… This cannot be the work of an ordinary person." Mohammad Bagher Ghalibaf, the parliament speaker, remarked that "a powerful entity is behind fuel smuggling.". Iranian officials have publicly addressed the issue of fuel smuggling but have generally avoided identifying specific institutions. President Masoud Pezeshkian stated that "a few million liters of fuel are smuggled daily,"

== See also ==
- Axis of Unity
- Chinese shadow fleet
- Iranian energy crisis
- Iranian shadow fleet
