= Compliance cost =

Expenses used to comply with regulations

Compliance costs are all expenses that a company uses up to adhere to government regulations. Compliance costs incorporate salaries of employees in compliance, time and funds spend on announcing, new system necessitated to meet retention, and so on. Compliance costs happen to be as results of local, national or even international regulation (for instance MiFID II or GDPR applying to countries in European Union). Global firms operating all over the world with varying new regulations in each country tend to face significantly larger compliance costs than those functionating solely in one region. Example – people registered for value added tax (shortly VAT) have to keep records of all tax (input and output) to simplify the completion of returns. They need to employ someone skilled in this domain, which is regarded as compliance cost.
Compliance cost mostly includes following:

- The cost to assemble and issue reports
- Cost of creating and maintenance of the system needed to collect facts and details for compliance reporting
- Cost of person to monitor compliance systems and to construct them

Compliance costs are often combined and misunderstood with regulatory risk or conduct costs. Compliance costs are simply onward for following rules as they arise. It may include variance compliance – human resources policies, independent audits, quarterly reports, environmental assessments etc.

== Rising cost of compliance ==
Managing and coping with rife and frequent regulation changes are one of the biggest challenges for compliance practitioners. Increasing personal liability is key concern, expected to rise each year, presumably. In regulated industries, compliance costs can rise to a point where they are barriers to entry to a market. That easily creates oligopoly. If that is the case, enterprises already competing in the concrete market mostly favor new regulations in order to keep new entrants from entering and making bigger competition. Costs are higher for firms operating for publicly held companies, they are more watched and are requested to produce reports.

== The impact on operating models ==
According to the survey: The cost of compliance, KPMG International, 2013; we can divide managers into two camps – first, those who react to changes as they happen without previous planning, and second, those who proactively use changes to transform their operating models. Interestingly, different continents reported remarkably similar results (varying in units of percentages). There was not a side which would overcome any approach. Although exceptions exist, some said they considered exiting market due to rising regulations, others admitted thinking about moving their fund domicile.
The changing regulatory system also influenced product development decisions. According to the research, managers agree that regulation might not be the best way to improve products designs.

== Taxonomy of regulatory costs ==
The OECD established a taxonomy of regulatory costs that goes like this:

- Compliance costs
  - Administrative burdens
    - Substantive compliance costs
    - Implementation costs – short-term costs, used to understand the new obligation, developing compliance strategies
    - Direct labor costs - wage and non-wage (sick leave etc.)
    - Overhead costs – office equipment, rent
    - Equipment costs – software and machinery
    - Material costs – for instance where material has to be changed for one more ecological
    - External service costs – professional assistance (only when it is needed – technician etc.) with goal to find most profitable way with new regulation
  - Administration and enforcement costs – implementing new licensing systems, processing renewals or publicizing a new information
- Financial costs - the price of capital spent on being in accordance with restrictions
- Indirect costs – also called “second costs”
- Opportunity costs – for example staff spends time on dealing with compliance instead of working on another projects
- Macro-economic costs – these affects variables such as GDP, GNI etc.

== Financial systems ==
Banks have faced a huge wave of new regulations in the decade after financial crisis in year 2008. The pace of incoming changes was enormous, so banks have been forced to hire remarkable number of employees to manage with this situation and be ahead of the regulations and avoid paying fees for any breaches. Since 2008, they have spent more than $321 billion of dollars on fines and settlements. Yearly it is spent approximately $270 billion on compliance and those costs are expected to double by year 2022.
Banks are developing strategies to reduce these costs. To do so, interest and focus turn to analytic technologies and artificial intelligence to become more cost-effective and be in accordance with compliance program.

- Regulatory requirements library – Most business compliance programs consist of library of requirements. To maintain these libraries requires manual updates and reviews. Artificial intelligence (=AI) technologies notices instantly when any component is in need of external or internal change. Then these libraries are updated in real-time.
- Responses to regulators – Banks and other businesses are frequently asked to provide with data assets. The period to do so is in some cases no longer than 72 hours. In the past, it was challenging to provide them while the data was not tracked already. AI technologies allow access the required information as they are received, without significant delay.
- Risk assessment - traditionally, risk assessments are managed by bigger group of professionals examining documents to understand more obligations. AI technologies can map those obligations and match them to appropriate laws so that the business impacted can understand the regulations better.

=== Focus on risk ===
Governments and policymakers have done so to prevent this from happening again. For remaining financially stable, Financial Stability Board (FBS) was founded. Compliance officers look to them as source of regulatory changes around the world. Expectation on compliance has largely changed mainly over the decade after crisis in 3 areas – culture and conduct risk, personal liability, technology.

== Compliance or non-compliance? ==
Compliance is not cheap. And as regulations keep coming, alongside companies try and focus more on transparency and firm's ethics, money and time spend on compliance grow. There is not only one option how to handle with those problems. You may decide not to follow the standards of legislative.
At macroeconomic level, boards and directors make decisions on governance issues and their strategic approach. Once strategy is implemented, associated costs are developed – the direct cost of the team, whether it is partly outsourced or managed in-house. Compliance teams turn to technology solutions. This technology also costs despite the fact investments might pay for itself in terms of future benefit achieved.
Certainly, following of ordinances has expenditures. Failing to grant with the standards mostly ensue with penalties. For example, a breach of General Data Protection Regulation (=GDPR) may conduct to fines of up to 20 million of euros. Increasingly, corporations come to the ending that compliance is everyone's responsibility. They cannot afford to underestimate the effect any defect or imperfection in governance might have on commercial performance.
If we compare compliance and non-compliance costs, breaches of the rules mostly lead to negative reactions from population, fines or in rare cases to prohibiting to do a business activity. On the contrary, perfect governance put in advance companies compared to their competitors. In spite of the fact costs to meet the requirements are likely to be noticeable, indirect costs of not complying can be far higher.

== Bylaws ==
Bylaws with a high cost of compliance can suffer from not being taken seriously and often being broken. For example, jurisdictions which ban smoking in all public areas theoretically have higher rates of people smoking in public areas as it would be inconvenient for them to go all the way home. Lawmakers therefore need to consider cost of compliance.

== Tax compliance ==
Compliance with tax laws, such as income tax or sales tax legislation, is a common topic of political debate, primarily because these taxes affect the majority of citizens in a society. By contrast, environmental regulations, such as those on sulfur dioxide emissions, only affect a minority of businesses within an economy.

== See also ==
- Taxation in the United States
