= Spoofing (anti-piracy measure) =

Spoofing, or decoying, was a practice in the early 2000s of inundating online networks with bogus or incomplete files of the same name as valid content in an effort to reduce copyright infringement on file sharing networks. In 2003, Cary Sherman, president of the Recording Industry Association of America (RIAA), called spoofing "an appropriate response to the problem of peer-to-peer piracy," and "a self-help measure that is completely lawful."

== See also ==
- Torrent poisoning
