= Kim So-yeon (disambiguation) =

Kim So-yeon (Korean: 김소연; born 1980) is a South Korean actress.

Kim So-yeon or Kim So-yon may also refer to:

- Kim So-yeon (writer) (born 1967), South Korean poet
- Kim So-yeon (activist) (born 1970), South Korean presidential candidates, 2012
- Kassy (born 1995), South Korean singer born Kim So-yeon
- So-yeon Schröder-Kim (born 1970), fifth wife of former German chancellor Gerhard Schröder
- Kim So-yeon (born 1972), South Korean actress Kim Ga-yeon
- Kim So-yeon (badminton) (born 1982), South Korean badminton player
