= So-yeon =

- Hangul: 소연
- RR: Soyeon
- MR: Soyŏn
- IPA: [sojʌn]

So-yeon, also spelled So-youn or So-yun, is a Korean given name.

People with this name include:

== Entertainers ==
- Kim Ga-yeon (born Kim So-yeon, 1972), South Korean actress
- Kim So-yeon (born 1980), South Korean actress
- Lee So-yeon (actress) (born 1983), South Korean actress
- Park So-yeon (singer) (born 1987), South Korean singer, member of girl group T-ara
- Jeong So-yeon (born 1994), South Korean singer, member of girl groups Laboum and WSG Wannabe
- Soyeon (born Jeon So-yeon, 1998), South Korean rapper and record producer, member of girl group (G)I-dle

== Sportspeople ==
- Lee So-yeon (judoka) (born 1981), South Korean judo practitioner
- Kim So-yeon (badminton) (born 1982), South Korean badminton player
- Ryu So-yeon (born 1990), South Korean golfer
- Ji So-yun (born 1991), South Korean footballer
- Lee So-yeon (speed skater) (born 1993), South Korean speed skater
- Han So-yeon (born 1995), South Korean badminton player
- Park So-youn (figure skater) (born 1997), South Korean figure skater

== Other ==
- Kim So-yeon (writer) (born 1967), South Korean poet
- Kim So-yeon (activist) (born 1970), South Korean trade unionist
- Yi So-yeon (born 1978), South Korean astronaut and biotechnologist
- Soyeon Kate Lee (born 1979), South Korean-born American pianist
- Soyeon Jeong (born 1983), South Korean science fiction writer

== See also ==
- List of Korean given names
