= Gerhard Schröder =

Chancellor of Germany from 1998 to 2005

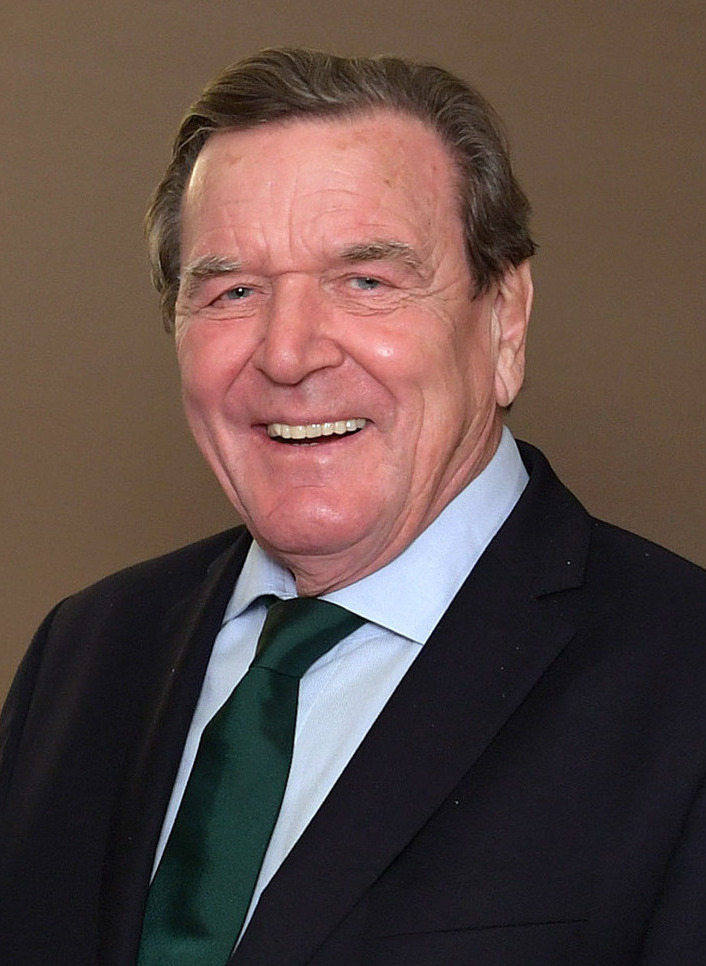
- Schröder in 2019

Chancellor of Germany
- In office 27 October 1998 – 22 November 2005
- President: Roman Herzog; Johannes Rau; Horst Köhler
- Vice Chancellor: Joschka Fischer
- Preceded by: Helmut Kohl
- Succeeded by: Angela Merkel

Leader of the Social Democratic Party
- In office 12 March 1999 – 21 March 2004
- General Secretary: Franz Müntefering; Olaf Scholz
- Preceded by: Oskar Lafontaine
- Succeeded by: Franz Müntefering

Minister-President of Lower Saxony
- In office 21 June 1990 – 27 October 1998
- Deputy: Gerhard Glogowski
- Preceded by: Ernst Albrecht
- Succeeded by: Gerhard Glogowski

President of the German Bundesrat
- In office 1 November 1997 – 27 October 1998
- First Vice President: Erwin Teufel
- Preceded by: Erwin Teufel
- Succeeded by: Hans Eichel

Leader of the Opposition in the Landtag of Lower Saxony
- In office 9 July 1986 – 21 June 1990
- Minister-President: Ernst Albrecht
- Preceded by: Karl Ravens
- Succeeded by: Jürgen Gansäuer
Parliamentary constituencies
Member of the Bundestag; from Lower Saxony
In office 26 October 1998 – 24 November 2005
Preceded by	Multi-member district
Succeeded by	Clemens Bollen
Constituency	State list
In office 4 November 1980 – 1 July 1986
Preceded by	Constituency established
Succeeded by	Helmuth Möhring
Constituency	Hannover-Land I (1980–1983); State list (1983–1986)
Member of the Landtag of Lower Saxony; for Lehrte
In office 9 July 1986 – 26 October 1998
Preceded by	Hans-Jürgen Mellentin
Succeeded by	Bernadette Schuster-Barkau

Personal details
- Born: Gerhard Fritz Kurt Schröder; 7 April 1944 (age 82) Blomberg, Nazi Germany
- Party: Social Democratic (since 1963)
- Spouses: Eva Schubach (m. 1968; div. 1972); Anne Taschenmacher (m. 1972; div. 1984); Hiltrud Schwetje (m. 1984; div. 1997); Doris Köpf (m. 1997; div. 2018); So-yeon Schröder-Kim (m. 2018)
- Children: 3
- Education: University of Göttingen
- Awards: Order of Merit
- Website: Official website

Gerhard "Gerd" Fritz Kurt Schröder (Note: German pronunciation: [ˈɡeːɐ̯haʁt fʁɪts kʊʁt ˈʃʁøːdɐ]) (born 7 April 1944) is a German former politician and lobbyist who served as Chancellor of Germany from 1998 to 2005. From 1999 to 2004, he was also the Leader of the Social Democratic Party of Germany (SPD). As chancellor, he led a coalition government of the SPD and Alliance 90/The Greens. Since leaving public office, Schröder has worked for Russian state-owned energy companies, including Nord Stream AG, Rosneft, and Gazprom.

Schröder was a lawyer before becoming a full-time politician, and he was Minister President of Lower Saxony (1990–1998) before becoming chancellor. Replacing the longest-ruling chancellor in modern German history, Helmut Kohl (CDU) in the 1998 federal election, he tried to address unemployment and poverty with the Agenda 2010 labour market reform, which changed the system of welfare benefits. Together with French president Jacques Chirac, in 2003, he did not join the Coalition of the Willing and vehemently criticised the United States for Operation Iraqi Freedom. Following the 2005 election, which his party lost, he stood down as chancellor in favour of Angela Merkel of the rival Christian Democratic Union (CDU). He was chairman of the board at Nord Stream AG and at Rosneft but in 2022 resigned from chairmanship and paused his plans to join the board of Russian state-run gas company Gazprom. Nonetheless, he continues to be a member of the board at Rosneft. He also had roles as a global manager for investment bank Rothschild, and as chairman of the board of football club Hannover 96.

After the Russian invasion of Ukraine, Schröder was criticised for his policies towards Vladimir Putin's government, his work for Russian state-owned companies, and his lobbying on behalf of Russia. In March 2022, the Public Prosecutor General initiated proceedings related to accusations against Schröder of complicity in crimes against humanity due to his role in Russian state-owned corporations, while the CDU/CSU group demanded that Schröder be included in the European Union sanctions against individuals with ties to the Russian government. An SPD party arbitration committee ruled in March 2023 that he had not violated any party rules and would remain a member of the party.

== Early life and education ==
Schröder was born in Blomberg, Lippe, in Germany. His father, Fritz Schröder, a lance corporal in the Wehrmacht, was killed in action in World War II in Romania on 4 October 1944, almost six months after Gerhard's birth. His mother, Erika (née Vosseler), worked as an agricultural labourer to support herself and her two sons.

After the war, the area where Schröder lived became part of West Germany. He completed an apprenticeship in retail sales in a Lemgo hardware shop from 1958 to 1961 and subsequently worked in a Lage retail shop and after that as an unskilled construction worker and a sales clerk in Göttingen while studying at night school for a general qualification for university entrance (Abitur). He did not have to do military service because his father had died in the war. In 1966, Schröder secured entrance to a university, passing the Abitur exam at Westfalen-Kolleg, Bielefeld. From 1966 to 1971, he studied law at the University of Göttingen.

In 1976, Schröder passed his second law examination, and he subsequently worked as a lawyer until 1990. Among his more controversial cases, Schröder helped Horst Mahler, a founding member of the Baader-Meinhof terrorist group, to secure both an early release from prison and permission to practice law again in Germany.

== Early political career ==
Schröder joined the Social Democratic Party in 1963. In 1978, he became the federal chairman of the Young Socialists, the youth organisation of the SPD. He spoke for the dissident Rudolf Bahro, as did President Jimmy Carter, Herbert Marcuse, and Wolf Biermann.

=== Member of the German Bundestag (1980–1986) ===
In 1980, Schröder was elected to the German Bundestag (federal parliament), where he wore a sweater instead of the traditional suit. Under the leadership of successive chairmen Herbert Wehner (1980–1983) and Hans-Jochen Vogel (1983–1986), he served in the SPD parliamentary group. He also became chairman of the SPD Hanover district.

Considered ambitious from early on in his political career, it was widely reported and never denied, that in 1982, a drunken Schröder stood outside the West German federal chancellery yelling: "I want to get in." That same year, he wrote an article on the idea of a red/green coalition for a book at Olle & Wolter, Berlin; this appeared later in Die Zeit. Chancellor Willy Brandt, the SPD and SI chairman who reviewed Olle & Wolter at that time, had just asked for more books on the subject.

In 1985, Schröder met the GDR leader Erich Honecker during a visit to East Berlin. In the 1986 Lower Saxony state election, Schröder was elected to the Landtag of Lower Saxony and became leader of the SPD group.

=== Minister-President of Lower Saxony (1990–1998) ===
After the SPD won the state elections in June 1990, Schröder became Minister-President of Lower Saxony as head of an SPD-Greens coalition; in this position, he also won the 1994 and 1998 state elections. He was subsequently also appointed to the supervisory board of Volkswagen, the largest company in Lower Saxony and of which the state of Lower Saxony is a major stockholder.

Following his election as Minister-President in 1990, Schröder also became a member of the board of the federal SPD. In 1997 and 1998, he served as President of the Bundesrat. Between 1994 and 1998, he was also chairman of Lower Saxonian SPD.

During Schröder's time in office, first in coalition with the environmentalist Green Party, then with a clear majority, Lower Saxony became one of the most deficit-ridden of Germany's 16 federal states, and unemployment rose higher than the national average of 12 percent. Ahead of the 1994 elections, SPD chairman Rudolf Scharping included Schröder in his shadow cabinet for the party's campaign to unseat incumbent Helmut Kohl as chancellor. During the campaign, Schröder served as shadow minister of economic affairs, energy and transport.

In 1996, Schröder caused controversy by taking a free ride on the Volkswagen corporate jet to attend the Vienna Opera Ball, along with Volkswagen CEO Ferdinand Piëch. The following year, he nationalised a big steel mill in Lower Saxony to preserve jobs.

In the 1998 state elections, Schröder's Social Democrats increased their share of the vote by about four percentage points over the 44.3% they recorded in the previous elections in 1994 – a postwar record for the party in Lower Saxony that reversed a string of Social Democrat reversals in state elections elsewhere.

== Chancellor of Germany (1998–2005) ==
=== Cabinets ===
==== First cabinet (1998–2002) ====
Following the 1998 national elections, Schröder became chancellor as head of an SPD-Green coalition. Throughout his campaign for chancellor, he portrayed himself as a pragmatic new Social Democrat who would promote economic growth while strengthening Germany's generous social welfare system.

After the resignation of Oskar Lafontaine as Leader of the Social Democratic Party in March 1999, in protest at Schröder's adoption of a number of what Lafontaine considered "neo-liberal" policies, Schröder took over his rival's office as well. In April 1999, in Germany's first session in the restored Reichstag, to applause, he quoted Albanian writer Ismail Kadare, saying: "The Balkans is the yard of the European house, and in no house can peace prevail so long as people kill each other in its yard." In a move meant to signal a deepening alliance between Schröder and Prime Minister Tony Blair of the United Kingdom, the two leaders issued an eighteen-page manifesto for economic reform in June 1999. Titled "Europe: The Third Way", or "Die Neue Mitte" in German, it called on Europe's centre-left governments to cut taxes, pursue labour and welfare reforms and encourage entrepreneurship. The joint paper said European governments needed to adopt a "supply-side agenda" to respond to globalisation, the demands of capital markets and technological change.

Schröder's efforts backfired within his own party, where its left wing rejected the Schröder–Blair call for cutbacks to the welfare state and pro-business policies. Instead, the paper took part of the blame for a succession of six German state election losses in 1999 for the Social Democratic Party. Only by 2000, Schröder managed to capitalise on the donations scandal of his Christian Democratic opposition to push through a landmark tax reform bill and re-establish his dominance of the German political scene.

Schröder's tenure oversaw the seat of government move from Bonn to Berlin. In May 2001, Schröder moved to his new official residence, the Federal Chancellery in Berlin, almost two years after the city became the seat of the German Government. He had previously been working out of the building in eastern Berlin used by the former leaders of East Germany.

==== Second cabinet (2002–2005) ====
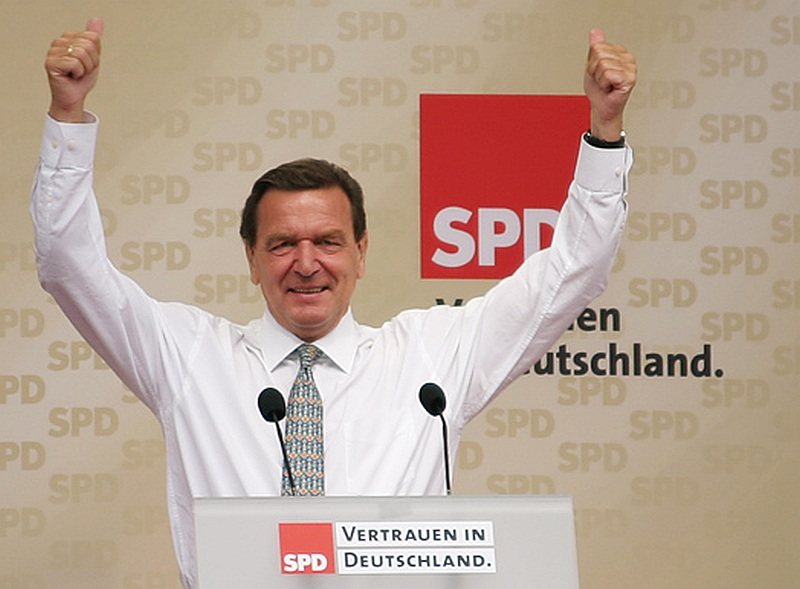
"SPD – Trust in Germany": Schröder in Esslingen

Throughout the build-up to the 2002 German election, the Social Democrats and the Green Party trailed the centre-right candidate Edmund Stoiber until the catastrophe caused by rising floodwater in Germany led to an improvement in his polling numbers. Furthermore, his popular opposition to a war in Iraq dominated campaigning in the run-up to the polls. At the 22 September 2002 vote, he secured another four-year term, with a narrow nine-seat majority down from 21.

In February 2004, Schröder resigned as chairman of the SPD amid growing criticism from across his own party of his reform agenda; Franz Müntefering succeeded him as chairman. On 22 May 2005, after the SPD lost to the Christian Democrats (CDU) in North Rhine-Westphalia, Gerhard Schröder announced he would call federal elections "as soon as possible". A motion of confidence was subsequently defeated in the Bundestag on 1 July 2005 by 151 to 296 (with 148 abstaining), after Schröder urged members not to vote for his government in order to trigger new elections. In response, a grouping of left-wing SPD dissidents and the Party of Democratic Socialism agreed to run on a joint ticket in the general election, with Schröder's rival Oskar Lafontaine leading the new group.

The 2005 German federal elections were held on 18 September. After the elections, neither Schröder's SPD-Green coalition nor the alliance between CDU/CSU and the FDP led by Angela Merkel achieved a majority in parliament, but the CDU/CSU had a stronger popular electoral lead by one percentage point. On election night, both Schröder and Merkel claimed victory and chancellorship, but after initially ruling out a grand coalition with Merkel, Schröder and Müntefering entered negotiations with her and the CSU's Edmund Stoiber. On 10 October, it was announced that the parties had agreed to form a grand coalition. Schröder agreed to cede the chancellorship to Merkel, but the SPD would hold the majority of government posts and retain considerable control of government policy. Merkel was elected chancellor on 22 November.

On 11 October 2005, Schröder announced that he would not take a post in the new cabinet and, in November, he confirmed that he would leave politics as soon as Merkel took office. On 23 November 2005, he resigned his Bundestag seat.

On 14 November 2005, at an SPD conference in Karlsruhe, Schröder urged members of the SPD to support the proposed coalition, saying it "carries unmistakably, perhaps primarily, the imprint of the Social Democrats". Many SPD members had previously indicated that they supported the coalition, which would have continued the policies of Schröder's government, but had objected to Angela Merkel replacing him as chancellor. The conference voted overwhelmingly to approve the deal.

=== Domestic policies ===
In his first term, Schröder's government decided to phase out nuclear power, fund renewable energies, institute civil unions for same-sex partners, and liberalise the naturalization law. During Schröder's time in office, economic growth slowed to only 0.2% in 2002 and Gross Domestic Product shrank in 2003, while German unemployment was over the 10% mark. Most voters soon associated Schröder with the Agenda 2010 reform program, which included cuts in the social welfare system (national health insurance, unemployment payments, pensions), lower taxes, and reformed regulations on employment and payment. He also eliminated capital gains tax on the sale of corporate stocks in an attempt to make the country more attractive to foreign investors. After the 2002 election, the SPD steadily lost support in opinion polls. Many increasingly perceived Schröder's Third Way program to be a dismantling of the German welfare state. Moreover, Germany's high unemployment rate remained a serious problem for the government. Schröder's tax policies were also unpopular; when the satirical radio show The Gerd Show released The Tax Song (Der Steuersong), featuring Schröder's voice (by impressionist Elmar Brandt) lampooning Germany's indirect taxation, it became Germany's 2002 Christmas #1 hit and sold over a million copies. The fact that Schröder served on the Volkswagen board (a position that came with his position as minister-president of Lower Saxony) and tended to prefer pro-car policies led to him being nicknamed the car chancellor (Auto-Kanzler).

=== European integration ===
In 1997, Schröder joined the minister-presidents of two other German states, Kurt Biedenkopf and Edmund Stoiber, in making the case for a five-year delay in Europe's currency union. After taking office, he made his first official trip abroad to France for meetings with President Jacques Chirac and Prime Minister Lionel Jospin in October 1998. A 2001 meeting held by both leaders in Blaesheim later gave the name to a regular series of informal meetings between the French president, the German chancellor, and their foreign ministers. The meetings were held alternately in France and Germany. At the fortieth anniversary of the Elysée Treaty, both sides agreed that rather than summits being held twice a year, there would now be regular meetings of a council of French and German ministers overseen by their respective foreign affairs ministers. In an unprecedented move, Chirac formally agreed to represent Schröder in his absence at a European Council meeting in October 2003.

In his first months in office, Schröder vigorously demanded that Germany's net annual contribution of about $12,000,000,000 to the budget of the European Union be cut, saying his country was paying most for European "waste." He later moderated his views when his government held the rotating Presidency of the Council of the European Union in 1999.

In 2003, Schröder and Chirac agreed to share power in the institutions of the European Union between a president of the European Commission, elected by the European Parliament, and a full-time President of the European Council, chosen by heads of state and government; their agreement later formed the basis of discussions at the Convention on the Future of Europe and became law with the entry into force of the Treaty of Lisbon. Ahead of the French referendum on a European Constitution, Schröder joined Chirac in urging French voters to back the new treaty, which would have enshrined new rules for the expanded EU of 25 member states and widened the areas of collective action.

Also in 2003, both Schröder and Chirac forced a suspension of sanctions both faced for breaching the European Union's fiscal rules that underpin the euro – the Stability and Growth Pact – for three years in a row. Schröder later called for a revision of the Lisbon Strategy and thereby a retreat from Europe's goal of overtaking the United States as the world's most competitive economy by 2010. Instead, he urged the EU to reform the Pact to encourage growth and to seek the reorientation of the €100,000,000,000 annual EU budget towards research and innovation. By 2005, he had successfully pushed for an agreement on sweeping plans to rewrite the Pact, which now allowed EU members with deficits above the original 3% of GDP limit to cite the costs of "the reunification of Europe" as a mitigating factor.

Schröder was regarded a strong ally of Prime Minister Leszek Miller of Poland and supporter of the 2004 enlargement of the European Union. On 1 August 2004, the sixtieth anniversary of the 1944 Warsaw Uprising, he apologised to Poland for "the immeasurable suffering" of its people during the conflict; he was the first German chancellor to be invited to an anniversary of the uprising. Both Schröder and Foreign Minister Joschka Fischer also supported the accession of Turkey to the European Union.

=== Foreign policy ===
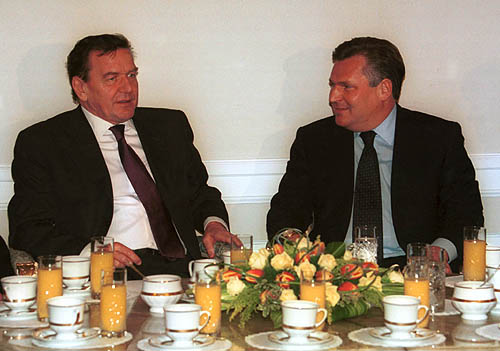
Gerhard Schröder with Polish president Aleksander Kwaśniewski on 6 December 2000

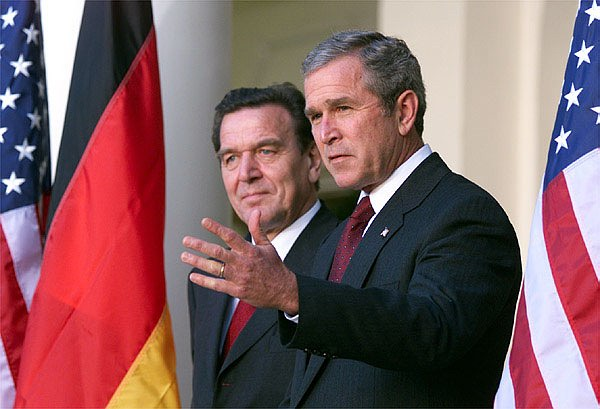
Gerhard Schröder with US president George W. Bush in Washington on 9 October 2001

Marking a clear break with the caution of German foreign policy since World War II, Schröder laid out in 1999 his vision of the country's international role, describing Germany as "a great power in Europe" that would not hesitate to pursue its national interests. Schröder also continued the established Social Democratic political tradition of Wandel durch Handel.

Schröder also began seeking a resolution and ways to compensate Nazi-era slave labourers almost as soon as he was elected chancellor. Reversing the hard-line stance of his predecessor, Helmut Kohl, he agreed to the government contributing alongside industry to a fund that would compensate people forced to work in German factories by the Nazi regime and appointed Otto Graf Lambsdorff to represent German industry in the negotiations with survivors' organisations, American lawyers and the US government.

Schröder sent forces to Kosovo and to Afghanistan as part of NATO operations. Until Schröder's chancellorship, German troops had not taken part in combat actions since World War II. At the beginning of the Iraq crisis, Schröder declared in March 2002 that Germany would not take part in the Iraq war without a UN mandate. In the summer of 2002, during the federal election campaign, he proclaimed the "German Way" as an alternative to the "American warmongering" in Iraq and presented Germany as a peace power.

In May 2019 at WORLD.MINDS in Belgrade, 20 years to the day after the bombing of Belgrade by NATO troops, Schröder stated unequivocally that in retrospect, if he had to make the decision again, he would authorize the aerial bombardment of the former Yugoslavia again. Schröder said that "the easiest solution would be to first accept Serbia into the European Union and then within, as an integral part the EU, find a solution [to the Kosovo issue]." With Germany having a long experience with terrorism itself, Schröder declared solidarity with the United States after the September 11 attacks in 2001. When Schröder left office, Germany had 2,000 troops in Afghanistan, the largest contingent from any nation other than the United States, UK, France, Canada and after two years Afghanistan.

==== China ====
During his time in office, Schröder visited China six times. He was the first Western politician to travel to Beijing and apologise after NATO jets had mistakenly bombed the Chinese Embassy in Belgrade in 1999. In 2004, he and Chinese premier Wen Jiabao established a secure, direct telephone line. He also pressed for the lifting of the EU arms embargo on China.

==== Middle East ====
During their time in government, both Schröder and his foreign minister Joschka Fischer were widely considered sincerely, if not uncritically, pro-Israel. In 2004, he declared that "the existence of a state of Israel within secure borders was an historic and political responsibility that is a pillar of our foreign policy." Schröder represented the German government at the funeral service for King Hussein of Jordan in Amman on 9 February 1999.

When British planes joined United States forces bombing Iraq without consulting the United Nations Security Council in December 1998, Schröder pledged "unlimited solidarity". But, along with French president Jacques Chirac and many other world leaders, Schröder later spoke out strongly against the 2003 invasion of Iraq and refused any military assistance in that invasion. Schröder's stance caused political friction between the US and Germany, in particular because he used this topic for his 2002 election campaign. Schröder's stance set the stage for alleged anti-American statements by members of the SPD. The parliamentary leader of the SPD, Ludwig Stiegler, compared US president George W. Bush to Julius Caesar while Schröder's minister of justice, Herta Däubler-Gmelin, likened Bush's foreign policy to that of Adolf Hitler. Schröder's critics accused him of enhancing and campaigning on anti-American sentiments in Germany. After his 2002 re-election, Schröder and Bush rarely met, and their animosity was seen as a widening political gap between the US and Europe. Bush stated in his memoirs that Schröder initially promised to support the Iraq war but changed his mind with the upcoming German elections and public opinion strongly against the invasion, to which Schröder responded saying that Bush was "not telling the truth". When asked in March 2003 if he was self-critical about his position on Iraq, Schröder replied, "I very much regret there were excessive statements" from himself and former members of his government (which capitalised on the war's unpopularity).

==== Russia ====
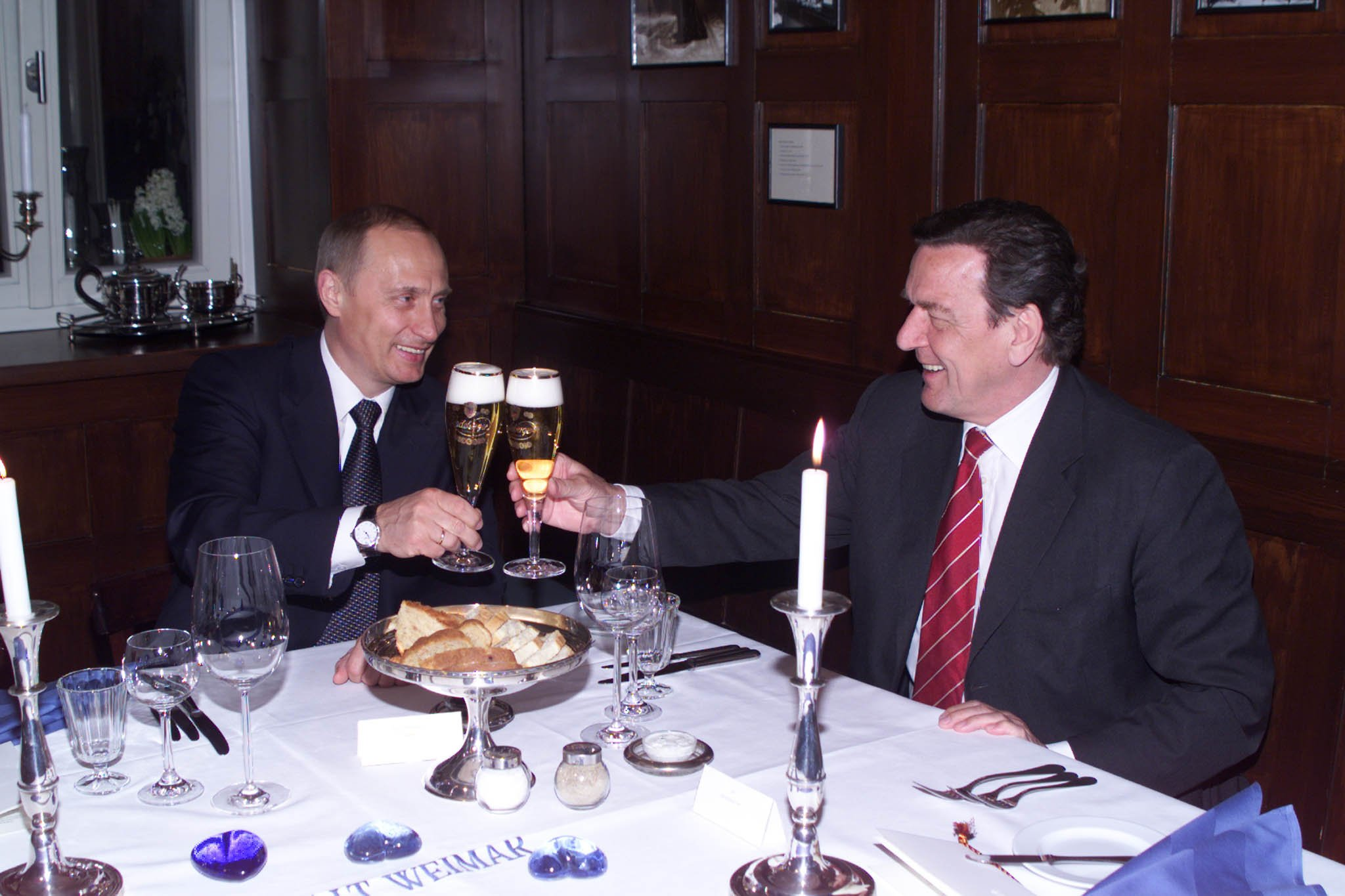
Schröder with Russian president Vladimir Putin at a dinner in Weimar, Germany, on 9 April 2002

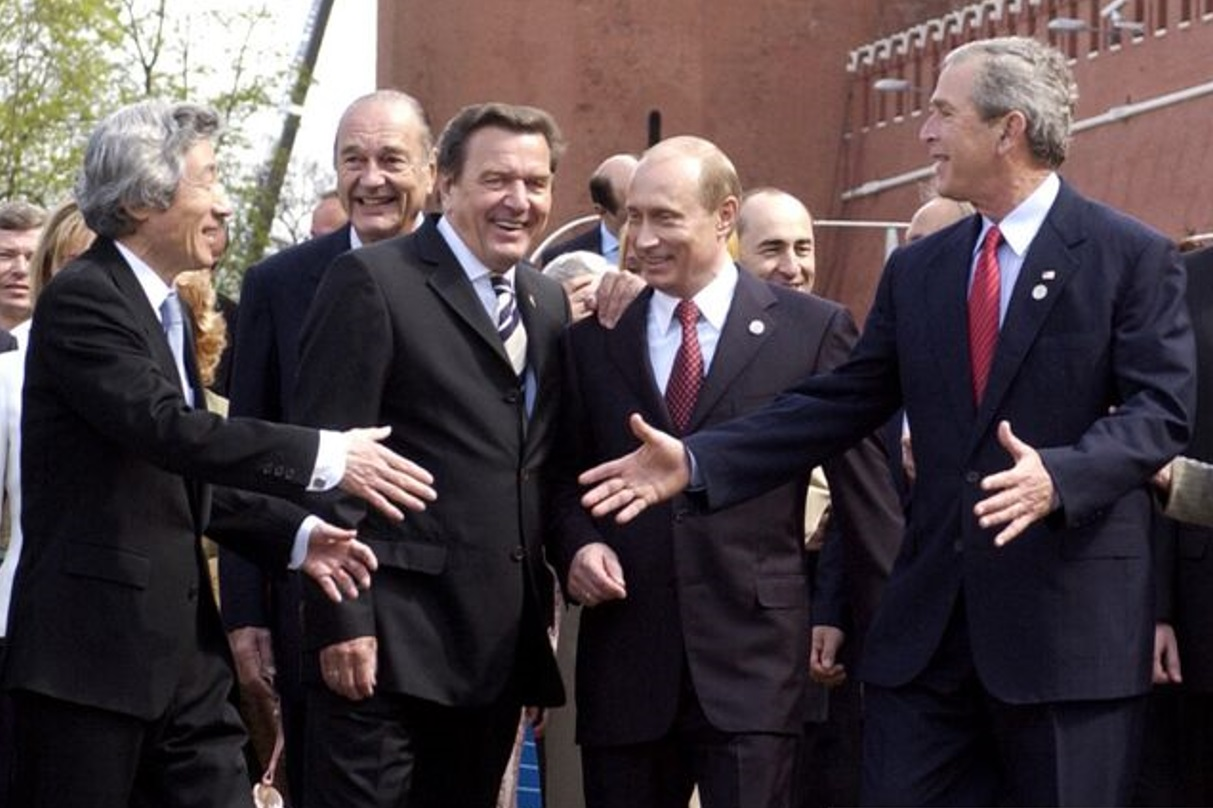
Schröder with George W. Bush, Vladimir Putin, Jacques Chirac and Junichiro Koizumi during the Victory Day Parade in Moscow, on 9 May 2005

On his first official trip to Russia in late 1998, Schröder suggested that Germany was not likely to come up with more aid for the country. He also sought to detach himself from the close personal relationship that his predecessor, Helmut Kohl, had with Russian president Boris Yeltsin, saying that German-Russian relations should "develop independently of concrete political figures." Soon after, however, he cultivated close ties with Yeltsin's successor, President Vladimir Putin, in an attempt to strengthen the "strategic partnership" between Berlin and Moscow, including the opening of a gas pipeline over the Baltic Sea exclusively between Russia and Germany (see "Gazprom controversy" below). During his time in office, he visited the country five times.

Schröder was criticised in the media, and subsequently by Angela Merkel, for calling Putin a "flawless democrat" on 22 November 2004, only days before Putin prematurely congratulated Viktor Yanukovich during the Orange Revolution. In 2005, Schröder suggested at the ceremonial introduction of the Airbus A380 in Toulouse that there was still "room in the boat" of EADS for Russia.

In his last days in office in 2005, he signed a deal between Germany and Russian state-owned Gazprom to build Nord Stream 1 before leaving office and almost immediately joining the pipeline company's board. He rejected criticism of the move and announced legal action over reports he would be paid between €200,000 (£134,000) and €1m a year. In 2022, he was reportedly paid about $270,000 a year as chairman of the shareholder committee.

Only a few days after his chancellorship, Schröder joined the board of directors of the Nord Stream joint venture, thus bringing about new speculations about his prior objectivity. In his memoirs Decisions: My Life in Politics, Schröder still defends his friend and political ally and states that "it would be wrong to place excessive demands on Russia when it comes to the rate of domestic political reform and democratic development, or to judge it solely on the basis of the Chechnya conflict." Schröder's continued close connection to Vladimir Putin and his government after his chancellorship has been widely criticised in Germany.

== After chancellorship ==
=== Representative role ===
After leaving public office, Schröder represented Germany at the funeral services for Boris Yeltsin in Moscow (jointly with Horst Köhler and Helmut Kohl, 2007) and Fidel Castro in Santiago de Cuba (jointly with Egon Krenz, 2016).

Schröder and Kurt Biedenkopf served as mediators in a conflict over privatization plans at German railway operator Deutsche Bahn; the plans eventually fell through. In 2016, he was appointed by Vice-Chancellor Sigmar Gabriel to mediate (alongside economist Bert Rürup) in a dispute between two of Germany's leading retailers, Edeka and REWE Group, over the takeover of supermarket chain Kaiser's Tengelmann.

Following the release of German activist Peter Steudtner from a Turkish prison in October 2017, German media reported that Schröder had acted as mediator in the conflict and, on the request of Gabriel, met with President Recep Tayyip Erdoğan to secure the release. After the 2018 and 2023 Turkish presidential elections, he represented the German government at Erdoğan's inauguration ceremony in Ankara (jointly with Christian Wulff, 2023).

=== Business activities ===
Schröder's plans after leaving office as chancellor and resigning his Bundestag seat included resuming his law practice in Berlin, writing a book, and implementing plans for twin pipelines for Gazprom, Russia's leading energy company. He was subsequently retained by the Swiss publisher Ringier AG as a consultant. Other board memberships include the following:

- Hyperglobus, member of the supervisory board (since 2026)
- Nord Stream 1, chairman of the Shareholders' Committee (since 2006);
- CargoBeamer, member of the advisory board;
- China Investment Corporation (CIC), member of the international advisory board;
- N M Rothschild & Sons, member of the European Advisory Council (since 2006);
- Herrenknecht, deputy chairman of the supervisory board (2017–2022);
- Hannover 96, chairman of the supervisory board (2016–2019);
- TNK-BP, member of the international advisory board (2009).

=== Other activities ===
In addition, Schröder has held several other paid and unpaid positions since he retired from German politics, including:

- Berggruen Institute, member of the Council for the Future of Europe and the 21st Century Council;
- Bundesliga Foundation, member of the board of trustees;
- German Cancer Research Center (DKFZ), member of the advisory council;
- Dresden Frauenkirche, member of the board of trustees;
- Friedrich Ebert Foundation (FES), Member;
- Mädchenchor Hannover Foundation, member of the board of trustees;
- Museum Berggruen, member of the international council;
- German Near and Middle East Association (NUMOV), honorary chairman of the board;
- Wilhelm Busch Museum, chairman of the board of trustees (since 2013);
- InterAction Council of Former Heads of State and Government, Member;
- International Willy Brandt Prize, member of the jury.

== Views and controversies ==
=== Relationship with Russian companies ===
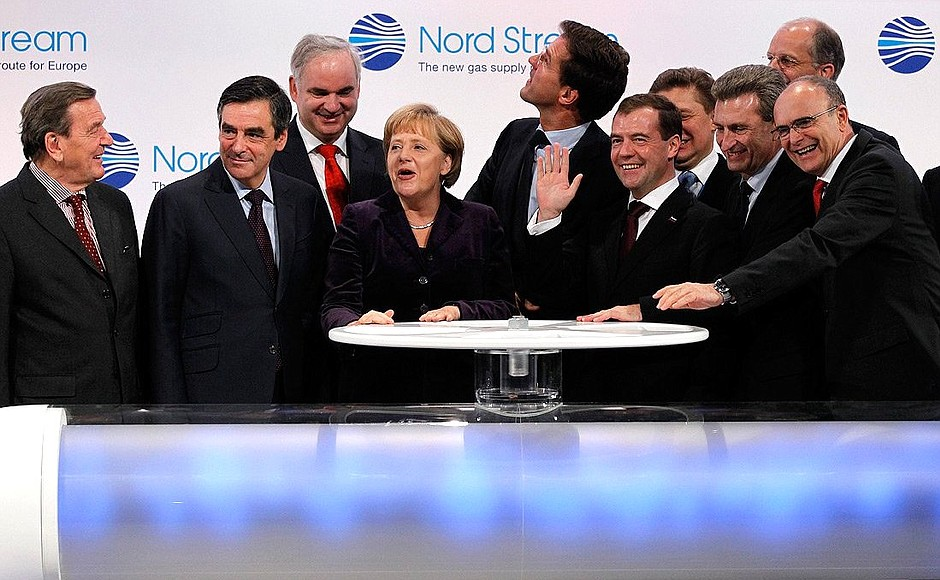
The Nord Stream opening ceremony on 8 November 2011 with Schröder, François Fillon, Angela Merkel, Mark Rutte, Dmitry Medvedev, Günther Oettinger, and Erwin Sellering

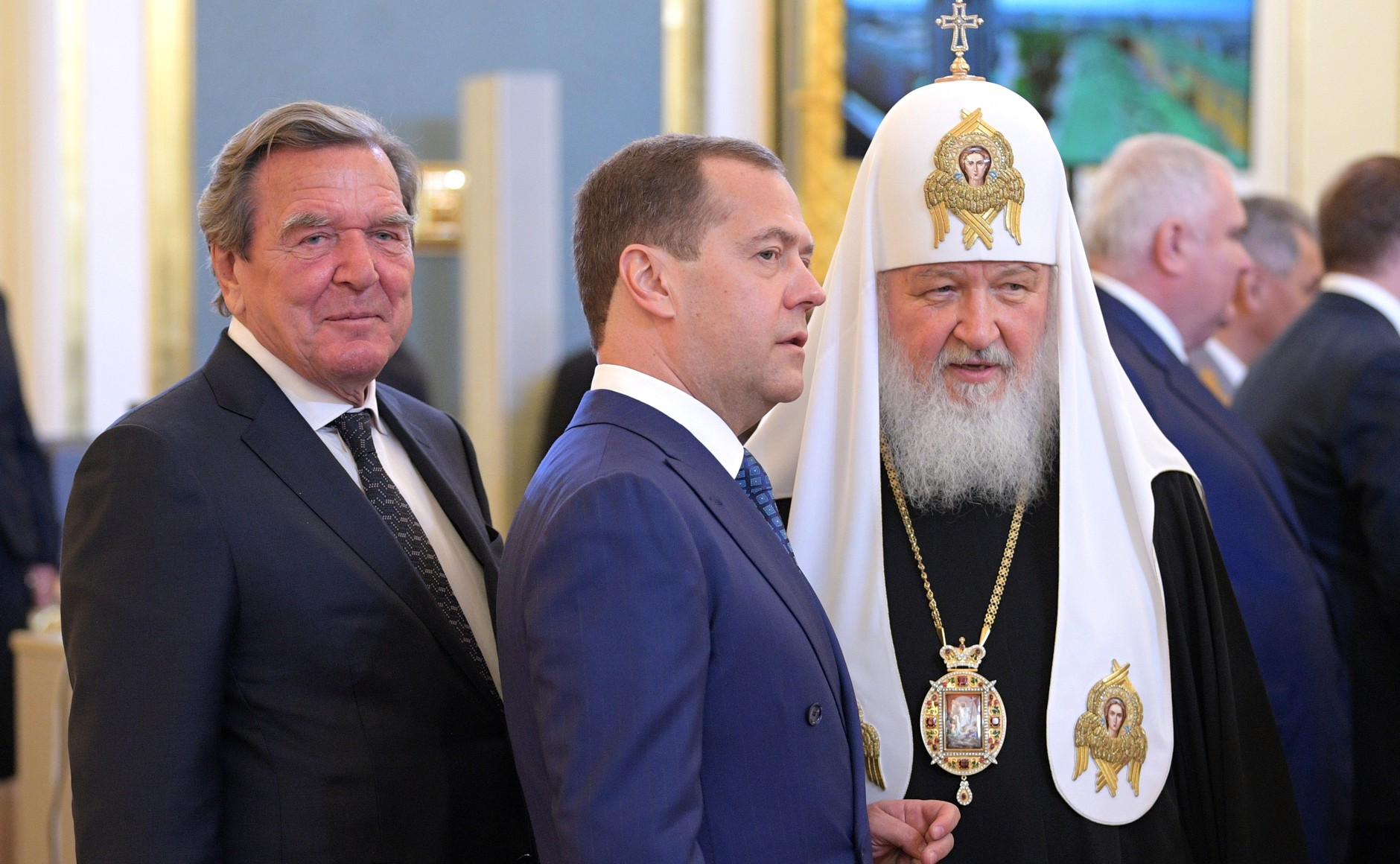
Schröder at Putin's inauguration with Dmitry Medvedev and Patriarch Kirill on 7 May 2018

As chancellor, Gerhard Schröder was a strong advocate of the Nord Stream 1 pipeline project, which planned to supply Russian gas directly to Germany, thereby bypassing transit countries. His advocacy of the project earned him the name "Gas-Gerd" (a play on the German term for a gas oven).

At the time of the German parliamentary election, according to Rick Noak of The Washington Post:

In 2005, Russian President Vladimir Putin's friend Schroeder hastily signed the deal just as he was departing the office from which he had been voted out days earlier. Within weeks, he started to oversee the project implementation himself, leading the Nord Stream AG's shareholder committee.

On 24 October 2005, just a few weeks before Schröder stepped down as chancellor, the German government guaranteed to cover 1 billion euros of the Nord Stream project cost, should Gazprom default on a loan. However, this guarantee was never used. Soon after stepping down as chancellor, Schröder accepted Gazprom's nomination for the post of the head of the shareholders' committee of Nord Stream AG, raising questions about a potential conflict of interest.

German opposition parties expressed concern over the issue, as did the governments of countries over whose territory gas was pumped at the time. In an editorial entitled Gerhard Schroeder's Sellout, the American newspaper The Washington Post also expressed sharp criticism, reflecting widening international ramifications of Schröder's new post. Democrat Tom Lantos, chairman of the United States House Committee on Foreign Affairs, likened Schröder to a "political prostitute" for his recent behaviour. In January 2009, the Wall Street Journal reported that Schröder would join the board of the oil company TNK-BP, a joint venture between oil major BP and Russian partners.

In 2016, Schröder switched to become manager of Nord Stream 2, an expansion of the original pipeline in which Gazprom is sole shareholder.

In 2017, Russia nominated Schröder to also be an independent director of the board of its biggest oil producer, Rosneft. At the time, Rosneft was under international sanctions over Russia's role in the Ukraine crisis. Schröder told Blick that he would be paid about $350,000 annually for the part-time post. His decision caused an outcry in Germany and abroad, especially in a climate of fear about any potential Russian interference in the 2017 German elections. German chancellor Angela Merkel criticised her predecessor, saying in August 2017: "I do not think what Mr Schröder is doing is okay".

In 2019, Schröder and his wife hosted the Nordstream Race, a sailing competition which finished in Saint Petersburg at the mouth of the undersea pipeline.

In early February 2022, Schröder was nominated to the board of directors of Gazprom. Later that year, facing criticism in Germany, he decided against taking on the role.

Especially as tensions between Russia and NATO mounted before the Russian invasion of Ukraine in 2022, Schröder's stance as a "Putinversteher" was criticised. Schröder criticised the behaviour of the Western countries as "sabre rattling". ARD journalist Georg Schwarte stated that Schröder would no longer be "a former chancellor. At best", he would be an "ex-chancellor with a sense of money." The former German chancellor Olaf Scholz (SPD) said in early February 2022 that "I don't want his advice." On 24 February 2022, Schröder condemned the Russian invasion of Ukraine and said that "even Russia's security interests do not justify the use of military means." In March 2022, Schröder met with both Ukrainian and Russian officials as an unofficial mediator between the two sides in peace talks. In 2022, it was reported that Schröder was paid nearly $1 million per year by Russian energy companies.

In their book Die Moskau Connection, journalists Bingener and Wehner describe the network around Schröder and his support for Putin's policies. Their conclusion is:

Schröder would have had quite a few opportunities to take a different path after his chancellorship. While researching this book, the authors did hear several explanations for why he did not, including defiance, greed and stubbornness. His actions nevertheless remain a mystery.

=== Views on Navalny ===
After Alexei Navalny was poisoned and hospitalised in Germany, Schröder was found to be relativising the alleged attack on Navalny. Navalny, after hearing of Schröder's apologising for Putin's regime, called Schröder, in Paul Lendvai's translation, a "Laufbursche Putins" (roughly "Putin's footman").

=== 2002 defamation lawsuit ===
In April 2002, Schröder sued the DDP press agency for publishing an opinion of public relations consultant Sabine Schwind saying that he "would be more credible if he didn't dye his grey hair". The court decided to ban the media from suggesting that he colours his hair. The Chancellor's spokesman said: "This is not a frivolous action taken over whether he does or doesn't dye his hair, but is a serious issue regarding his word." The agency's lawyer said that they could not accept a verdict which "does not coincide with freedom of the press".

=== 2007 dispute over Estonian war memorial ===
During a heated dispute between Russia and Estonia in May 2007 over the removal of a Soviet-era war memorial from the centre of the Estonian capital Tallinn to a military cemetery, Schröder defended the Kremlin's reaction. He remarked that Estonia had contradicted "every form of civilised behaviour". Consequently, the Estonian government cancelled a planned visit by Schröder in his function as chairman of Nord Stream 1 AG, which promotes the petroleum pipeline from Russia to Germany.

=== Kosovo independence ===
Schröder has criticised some European countries' swift decision to recognise Kosovo as an independent state after it unilaterally declared independence from Serbia in February 2008. He believes the decision was taken under heavy pressure from the US government and has caused more problems, including the weakening of the so-called pro-EU forces in Serbia.

=== Israeli-Palestinian conflict ===
In 2006, Schröder caused controversy when he called for direct talks with the Hamas-controlled Palestinian Authority to resolve the Israeli–Palestinian conflict, and criticised the Israeli government's plans to "draw a unilateral border". His words drew criticism from all major German political parties.

=== South Ossetia and Crimea ===
In August 2008, Schröder laid the blame for the 2008 South Ossetia war squarely on Georgian president Mikhail Saakashvili and "the West", hinting at American foreknowledge.

In March 2014, Schröder likened Russia's intervention in Crimea with NATO bombing of Yugoslavia, citing both cases as violations of international law and the UN Charter. He further stated that there had been "unhappy developments" on the outskirts of the former Soviet Union since the end of the Cold War, leading Putin to develop justifiable "fears about being encircled". On 13 March 2014, an attempt by the German Green Party to ban Schröder from speaking in public about Ukraine was narrowly defeated in the European parliament. His decision to celebrate his 70th birthday party with Putin in Saint Petersburg's Yusupov Palace in late April elicited further criticism from several members of Merkel's grand coalition, including human rights spokesperson Christoph Strässer.

=== Paradise Papers ===
In November 2017, an investigation conducted by the International Consortium of Investigative Journalism cited his name in the list of politicians named in "Paradise Papers" allegations.

=== 2022 suit against the German Parliament ===
In August 2022, Schröder filed a suit with the Berlin administrative court against the Bundestag that sought to reinstate his privileges as former chancellor, appealing a decision to close his office and reallocate its remaining staff. He lost cases with two Berlin courts to reverse the decision in 2023 and 2024, respectively.

== Personal life ==
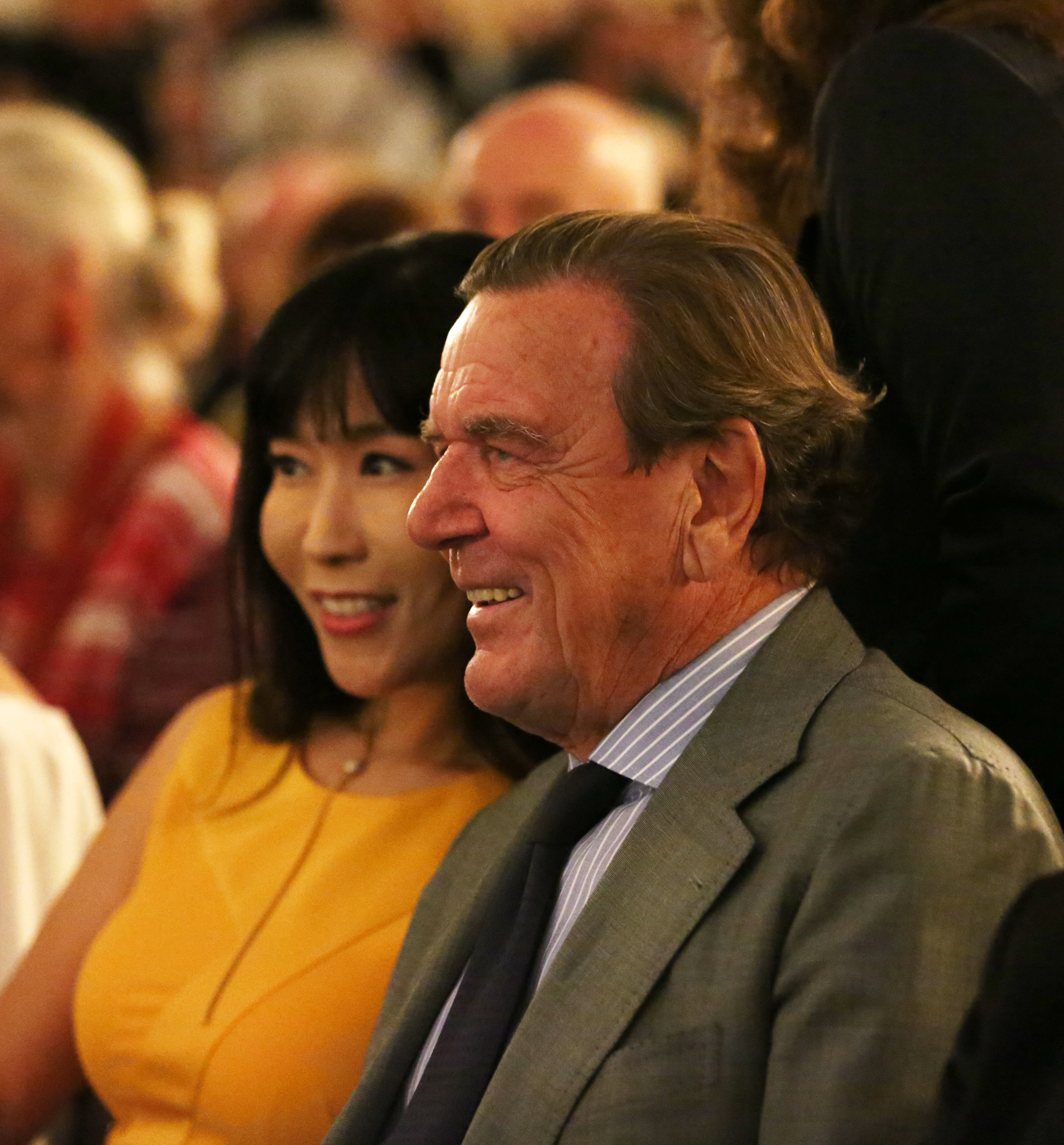
Kim So-Yeon and Gerhard Schröder, 2018

Schröder has been married five times:

- Eva Schubach (married 1968, divorced 1972);
- Anne Taschenmacher (married 1972, divorced 1984);
- Hiltrud "Hillu" Hampel (married 1984, divorced 1997);
- Doris Köpf (married 1997, divorced 2018);
- So-yeon Schröder-Kim (married 2018).

Doris Köpf had a daughter from a previous relationship with a television journalist. She lived with the couple. In July 2004, Schröder and Köpf adopted a child from Saint Petersburg. In 2006, they adopted another child from Saint Petersburg.

Schröder rents an apartment in Berlin while retaining his primary residence in Hanover. As a former chancellor, he is entitled to a permanent office, also situated in Berlin. In late 2005, he spent time in the UK improving his English language skills. In 2013, Schröder and Köpf purchased another home in Gümüşlük, Turkey, in a real estate project developed by Nicolas Berggruen.

Schröder's fourth marriage earned him the nickname "Audi Man", a reference to the four-ring symbol of Audi motorcars. Another nickname is "The Lord of the Rings".

Schröder married for the fifth time in 2018. His wife is South Korean economist and interpreter Kim So-yeon.

Schröder is Lutheran-Protestant. He did not add the optional phrase "so help me God" (So wahr mir Gott helfe) when sworn in as chancellor for his first term in 1998.

Schröder is known to be an avid art collector. He chose his friend Jörg Immendorff to paint his official portrait for the German Chancellery. The portrait, which was completed by Immendorff's assistants, was revealed to the public in January 2007; the massive work has an ironic character, showing the former chancellor in a stern heroic pose, in the colours of the German flag, painted in the style of an icon, surrounded by little monkeys. These "painter monkeys" were a recurring theme in Immendorff's work, serving as an ironic commentary on the artist's practice. On 14 June 2007, Schröder gave a eulogy at a memorial service for Immendorff at the Alte Nationalgalerie in Berlin.

In February 2025, Schröder was hospitalised due to severe burnout syndrome.

== Awards and honours ==
=== Honours ===
==== National honours ====
- Germany: Grand Cross 1st Class of the Order of Merit of the Federal Republic of Germany (1999)

==== Foreign honours ====
- Georgia: Order of the Golden Fleece (2000)
- Poland: Order of the White Eagle (2002)
- Romania: Grand Cross of the Order of the Star of Romania (2004)
- Croatia: Grand Cross of the Grand Order of Queen Jelena (2006)
- Czech Republic: Order of the White Lion (2017)

==== Other honours ====
- In 2000, Schröder received the Deutscher Medienpreis in Baden-Baden, Baden-Württemberg.
- In 2007, Schröder receive the Quadriga Prize in Berlin.
- On 28 May 2008, Schröder was elected as a corresponding member of the Department of Social Sciences of the Russian Academy of Sciences.

=== Honorary degrees ===
- On 30 December 2002, Schröder was awarded an honorary doctorate from the Tongji University in Shanghai.
- In June 2003, he was awarded an honorary doctorate from the Saint Petersburg State University.
- On 4 April 2005, he was awarded an honorary doctorate from Marmara University in Istanbul.
- On 14 June 2005, he was awarded an honorary doctorate from the University of Göttingen in Göttingen, Lower Saxony.
- On 17 June 2007, he was awarded an honorary doctorate from the University of Damascus in Damascus, Syria.
- In 2007, he was awarded an honorary doctorate from the University of Urbino in Urbino, Italy.

=== Rescinded honours ===
- On 24 February 2006, Schröder became an honorary citizen of his hometown of Hanover. In March 2022, in response to his collusion with Russia and Vladimir Putin, the city council of Hanover initiated proceedings to strip Schröder of his honorary citizenship. Shortly before the formal vote to strip him of the honorary citizenship, Schröder countered by writing to the mayor that he relinquished the honorary citizenship "for eternity".

== Works ==
- Gerhard Schröder and Ulrich Wickert: Deutschland wird selbstbewusster. Hohenheim-Verlag, 2000 ISBN 3-89850-010-1.

== See also ==
- Politics of Germany

Political offices
Preceded by Ernst Albrecht	Minister President of Lower Saxony; 1990–1998	Succeeded by Gerhard Glogowski
Preceded by Erwin Teufel	President of the Bundesrat; 1997–1998	Succeeded by Hans Eichel
Preceded by Helmut Kohl	Chancellor of Germany; 1998–2005	Succeeded by Angela Merkel
Party political offices
Preceded by Oskar Lafontaine	Leader of the Social Democratic Party; 1999–2004	Succeeded by Franz Müntefering
Diplomatic posts
Preceded by Tony Blair	Chairperson of the Group of 8; 1999	Succeeded by Yoshirō Mori
