= 2012 South Korean presidential election =

- 19 December 2012
- Registered: 40,507,842
- Turnout: 75.84% (▲12.81pp)
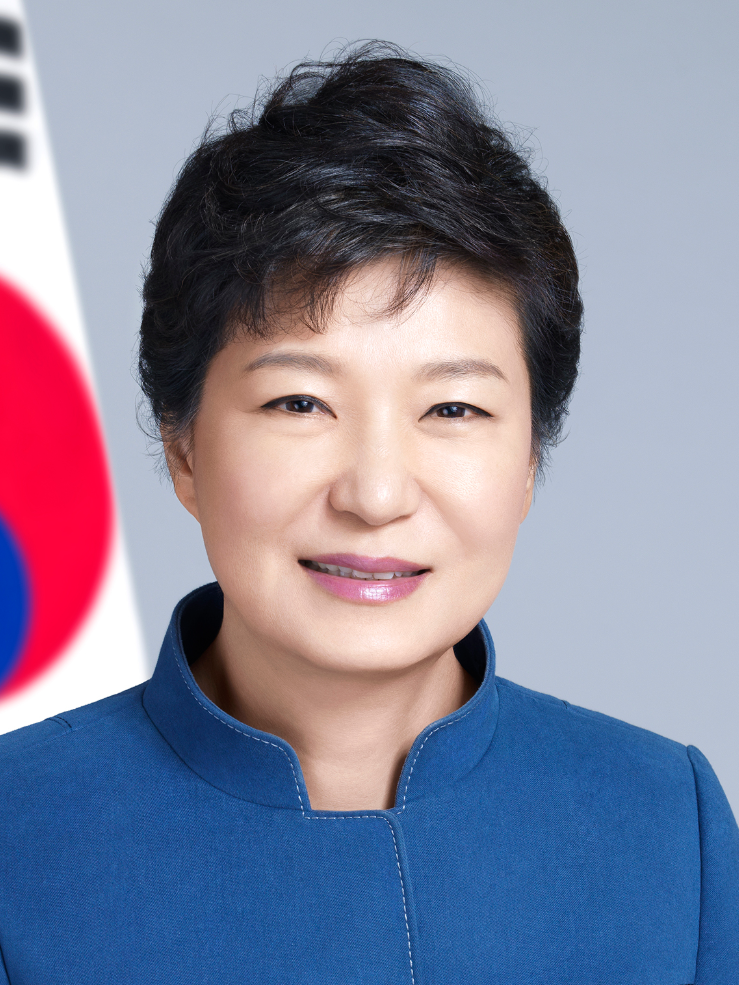

Nominee	Park Geun-hye	Moon Jae-in
Party	Saenuri	Democratic United
Popular vote	15,773,128	14,692,632
Percentage	51.56%	48.02%
President before election
Lee Myung-bak
Saenuri
Elected President
Park Geun-hye
Saenuri

Presidential elections were held in South Korea on 19 December 2012. They were the sixth presidential elections since democratisation and the establishment of the Sixth Republic, and were held under a first-past-the-post system, in which there was a single round of voting and the candidate receiving the highest number of votes was elected.

Under the South Korean constitution, a president is restricted to a single five-year term in office. The term of the then incumbent president Lee Myung-bak ended on 24 February 2013. According to The Korea Times, 30.7 million people voted, with turnout at 75.8%.

Park Geun-hye of the Saenuri party was elected the first female South Korean president with 51.6% of the vote opposed to 48.0% for her opponent Moon Jae-in. Park's share of the vote was the highest won by any candidate since the beginning of free and fair direct elections in 1987 and the first such election in which any candidate won a majority. Moreover, as of the 2025 election, this is the latest South Korean presidential election in which the winning candidate won an absolute majority of the vote.

In 2017, following Park's impeachment and removal from office, Moon would go on to succeed her as president following a successful bid for the presidency in the 2017 presidential election.

== Background ==
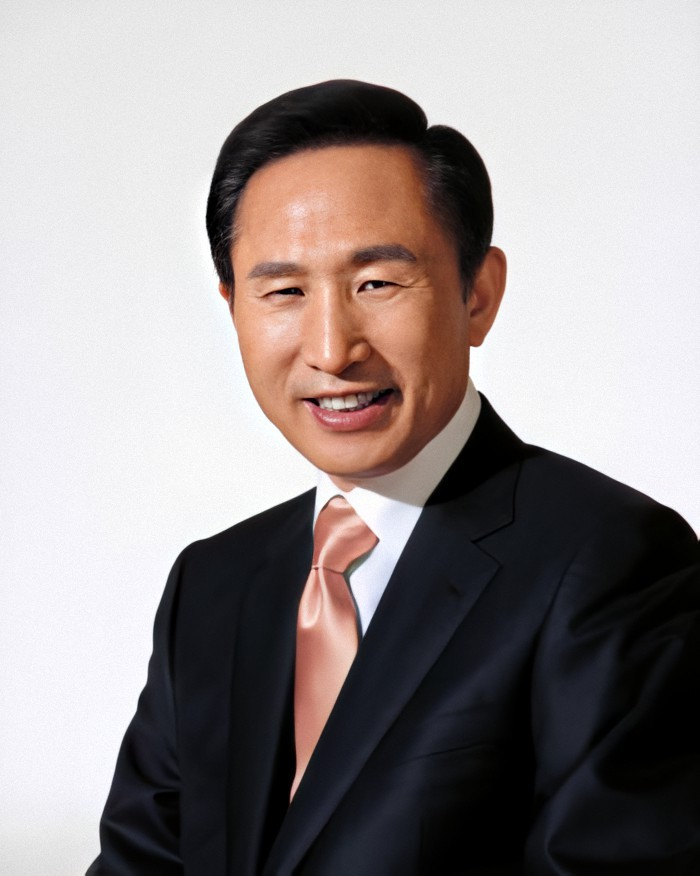
The incumbent in 2012, Lee Myung-bak. His term expired on 25 February 2013.

Lee Myung-bak was elected President of South Korea in 2007 as the nominee of the conservative Grand National Party after a closely contested primary in which he narrowly defeated Park Geun-hye, and assumed office in February 2008. His victory brought to a close ten years of liberal administration under Kim Dae-jung and Roh Moo-hyun. The Lee Myung-bak government pursued the reduction of government bureaucracy and a laissez-faire economic policy, and came under criticism from the left for political scandals and controversial policies such as the Jeju-do Naval Base and its support of the South Korea-United States Free Trade Agreement, although both were initiated under the previous administration. Despite the fact that he was elected in a landslide victory and received initial approval ratings of 70%, Lee's ratings had declined to below 30% by 2012.

At the end of 2011, Park Geun-hye assumed control of the Grand National Party, which was subsequently renamed the Saenuri or New Frontier Party in February 2012. She distanced herself from Lee and led the party towards the center. In legislative elections in April 2012, Park guided the party to an upset victory, returning its majority in the National Assembly. This contributed to an increase in her poll ratings and consolidated her position as frontrunner for the Saenuri nomination.

Opposition to Saenuri was divided primarily between the Democratic United Party and independent supporters of Ahn Cheol-soo, who emerged as a leading potential candidate despite his ostensible silence on the race. In the DUP, focus initially lay on Sohn Hak-kyu as a potential nominee, but by late 2011 Moon Jae-in, a confidant of former president Roh, had overtaken Sohn in polls. Although the DUP invited Ahn to join the party, only 2.3% of respondents to a poll on 21 April thought that Ahn was best suited to be DUP nominee. The DUP itself has been troubled by the split between pro-Roh members such as Moon Jae-in and the "Honam wing" of former president Kim Dae-jung, represented by Chung Dong-young.

== Registered candidates ==
Ballot numbers for party candidates were given according to the candidate's party seat distribution in the National Assembly. Ballot numbers for independent candidates were determined through a random lottery by the National Election Commission.

1	2	3 (Resigned)	4	5	6	7
Park Geun-hye	Moon Jae-in	Lee Jung-hee	Park Jong-sun	Kim So-yeon	Kang Ji-won	Kim Soon-ja
Saenuri	Democratic United	Unified Progressive	Independent	Independent	Independent	Independent

== Nominations ==
=== Democratic United Party ===
==== Nominee ====
2

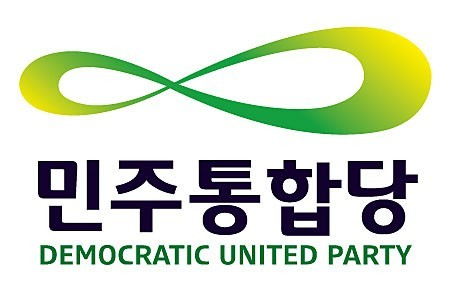
Democratic United Party

Democratic Party candidate
Moon Jae-in

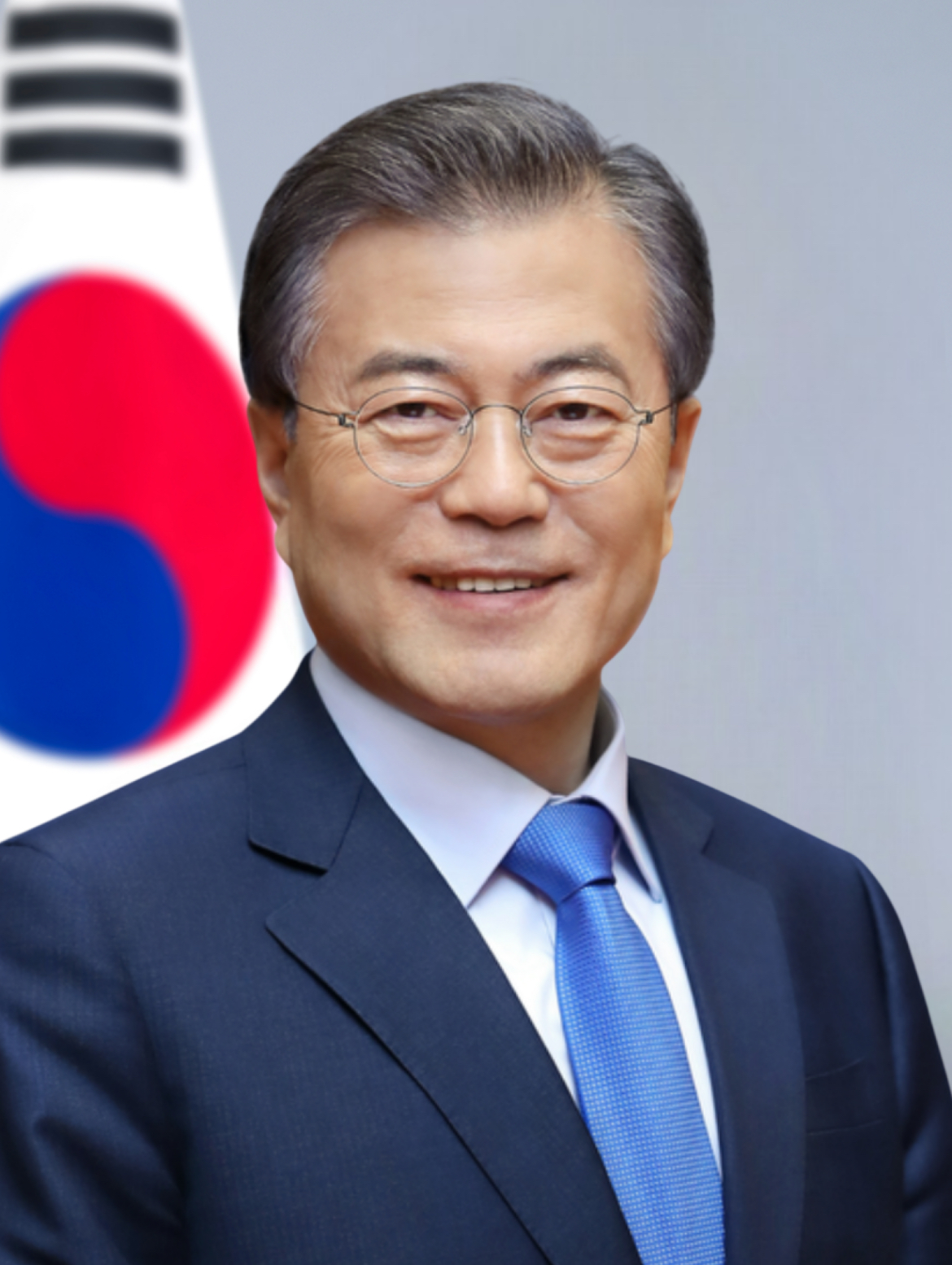

Member of the National Assembly
(2012– )

==== Campaign ====
The 2012 Democratic United Party presidential primary saw an open primary system implemented for the first time. This new open primary introduced "mobile voting"; it was hailed as a "revolution in voting" because people could participate in voting more conveniently. However, controversies persisted during the primary elections, as questions of the legitimacy and trustworthiness of the voting results were raised. The official result was announced on 16 September 2012, at 15:32 KST, naming Moon Jae-in the presidential candidate from the Democratic United Party. After winning the nomination, Moon stated that he would like to join forces with Ahn Cheol-soo.

==== Candidates ====
- Moon Jae-in, Member of National Assembly from Busan Sansang, former Chief of Staff to the President, former Senior Secretary to the President for Civil Affairs, former Senior Secretary to the President for Civil Society
- Sohn Hak-kyu, former Governor of Gyeonggi, former Minister of Health and Welfare, former Member of National Assembly from Gyeonggi Gwangmyeong·Gwangmyeong B·Seongnam Bundang B
- Kim Doo-kwan, former Governor of South Gyeongsang, former Mayor of Namhae, former Minister of the Interior
- Chung Sye-kyun, Member of National Assembly from Seoul Jongno, former Minister of Commerce, Industry and Energy
- Park Joon-young, Governor of South Jeolla, former Senior Presidential Secretary for Public Relations·Presidential Spokesperson
- Cho Kyoung-tae, Member of National Assembly from Busan Saha B
- Kim Jung-kil, former Minister of the Interior, former Senior Secretary to the President for Political Affairs, former Member National Assembly Busan Yeongdo
- Kim Young-hwan, Member of National Assembly from Gyeonggi Ansan Sangnok B, former Minister of Science and Technology

Jo, Kim J and Kim Y were disqualified by the party through a cutoff poll, where only top five candidates were allowed to pass to primaries. Park withdrew before the primaries began.

==== Results ====
P= Pre-registered electors who voted at Polling booths; M: Pre-registered electors who voted through Mobile devices; D= Party Delegates who voted at the polling booths

Moon Jae-in won the nomination on the first ballot, so no run-off contest was needed.

Absolute majority needed to win
Dates	Races		Moon		Sohn		Kim		Chung		Total	
Dates	Races		Votes	%	Votes	%	Votes	%	Votes	%	Votes	%
25 Aug.	Jeju	P	301	49.5	155	25.5	134	22.0	18	3.0	608	100
25 Aug.	Jeju	M	11,701	60.5	3,693	20.5	2,739	14.2	942	4.9	19,35	100
25 Aug.	Jeju	D	21	14.1	52	34.9	71	47.7	5	3.4	149	100
26 Aug.	Ulsan	P	176	58.5	42	14.0	50	16.6	33	11.0	301	100
26 Aug.	Ulsan	M	4,719	51.9	1,058	11.6	2,974	32.7	347	3.8	9,098	100
26 Aug.	Ulsan	D	56	51.4	17	15.6	29	26.6	7	6.4	109	100
28 Aug.	Gangwon	P	192	50.0	121	31.5	52	13.5	19	4.9	384	100
28 Aug.	Gangwon	M	2,598	46.9	2,075	37.4	574	10.4	298	5.4	5,545	100
28 Aug.	Gangwon	D	47	18.2	132	51.2	52	20.2	27	10.5	258	100
30 Aug.	N. Chungcheong	P	209	39.5	232	43.9	80	15.1	8	1.5	529	100
30 Aug.	N. Chungcheong	M	7,796	46.4	6,755	40.2	1,780	10.6	455	2.7	16,786	100
30 Aug.	N. Chungcheong	D	127	39.4	121	37.6	71	22.0	3	0.9	322	100
1 Sep.	N. Jeolla	P	782	17.1	1,259	27.5	684	14.9	1,855	40.5	4,580	100
1 Sep.	N. Jeolla	M	15,489	40.3	8,757	22.8	4,707	12.3	9,443	24.6	38,396	100
1 Sep.	N. Jeolla	D	79	13.7	177	30.7	63	10.9	258	44.7	577	100
2 Sep.	Incheon	P	191	42.9	153	34.4	73	16.4	28	6.3	445	100
2 Sep.	Incheon	M	5,607	51.2	2,841	25.9	1,823	16.6	687	6.3	10,958	100
2 Sep.	Incheon	D	130	30.2	149	34.6	80	18.6	72	16.7	431	100
4 Sep.	S. Gyeongsang	P	354	25.1	136	9.6	908	64.3	14	1.0	1,412	100
4 Sep.	S. Gyeongsang	M	11,216	46.5	2,256	9.4	10,265	42.6	374	1.6	24,111	100
4 Sep.	S. Gyeongsang	D	113	29.4	52	13.5	208	54.0	12	3.1	385	100
6 Sep.	Gwangju S. Jeolla	P	1,385	27.6	2,182	43.4	1,257	25.0	200	4.0	5,024	100
6 Sep.	Gwangju S. Jeolla	M	32,345	50.5	20,053	31.3	9,546	14.9	2,105	3.3	64,049	100
6 Sep.	Gwangju S. Jeolla	D	179	19.9	375	41.7	215	23.9	130	14.5	899	100
8 Sep.	Busan	P	714	64.1	90	8.1	290	26.0	20	1.8	1,114	100
8 Sep.	Busan	M	17,162	66.4	2,577	10.0	5,542	21.4	562	2.2	25,843	100
8 Sep.	Busan	D	259	62.6	59	14.3	75	18.1	21	5.1	414	100
9 Sep.	Daejeon Sejong S. Chungcheong	P	468	57.1	215	26.3	95	11.6	41	5.0	819	100
9 Sep.	Daejeon Sejong S. Chungcheong	M	14,373	63.3	4,026	17.7	2,481	10.9	1,838	8.1	22,718	100
9 Sep.	Daejeon Sejong S. Chungcheong	D	263	48.1	139	25.4	64	11.7	81	14.8	547	100
12 Sep.	Daegu N. Gyeongsang	P	365	57.4	90	14.2	169	26.6	12	1.9	636	100
12 Sep.	Daegu N. Gyeongsang	M	9,745	57.5	3,028	17.9	3,318	19.6	846	5.0	16,937	100
12 Sep.	Daegu N. Gyeongsang	D	165	34.7	96	20.2	134	28.2	80	16.8	475	100
15 Sep.	Gyeonggi	P	1,219	55.7	677	30.9	187	8.5	107	4.9	2,190	100
15 Sep.	Gyeonggi	M	47,844	63.5	17,270	22.9	6,661	8.8	3,527	4.7	75,302	100
15 Sep.	Gyeonggi	D	522	37.0	530	37.5	130	9.2	230	16.3	1,412	100
16 Sep.	Seoul	P	1,434	56.3	688	27.0	229	9.0	195	7.7	2,546	100
16 Sep.	Seoul	M	156,122	60.8	53,197	20.7	29,845	11.6	17,756	6.9	256,920	100
16 Sep.	Seoul	D	715	42.5	41	24.4	187	11.1	371	22.0	1,683	100
Total			347,183	56.5	136,205	22.2	87,842	14.3	43027	7.0	614,257	100

=== Saenuri Party ===
==== Nominee ====
1

Saenuri Party

Saenuri Party candidate
Park Geun-hye

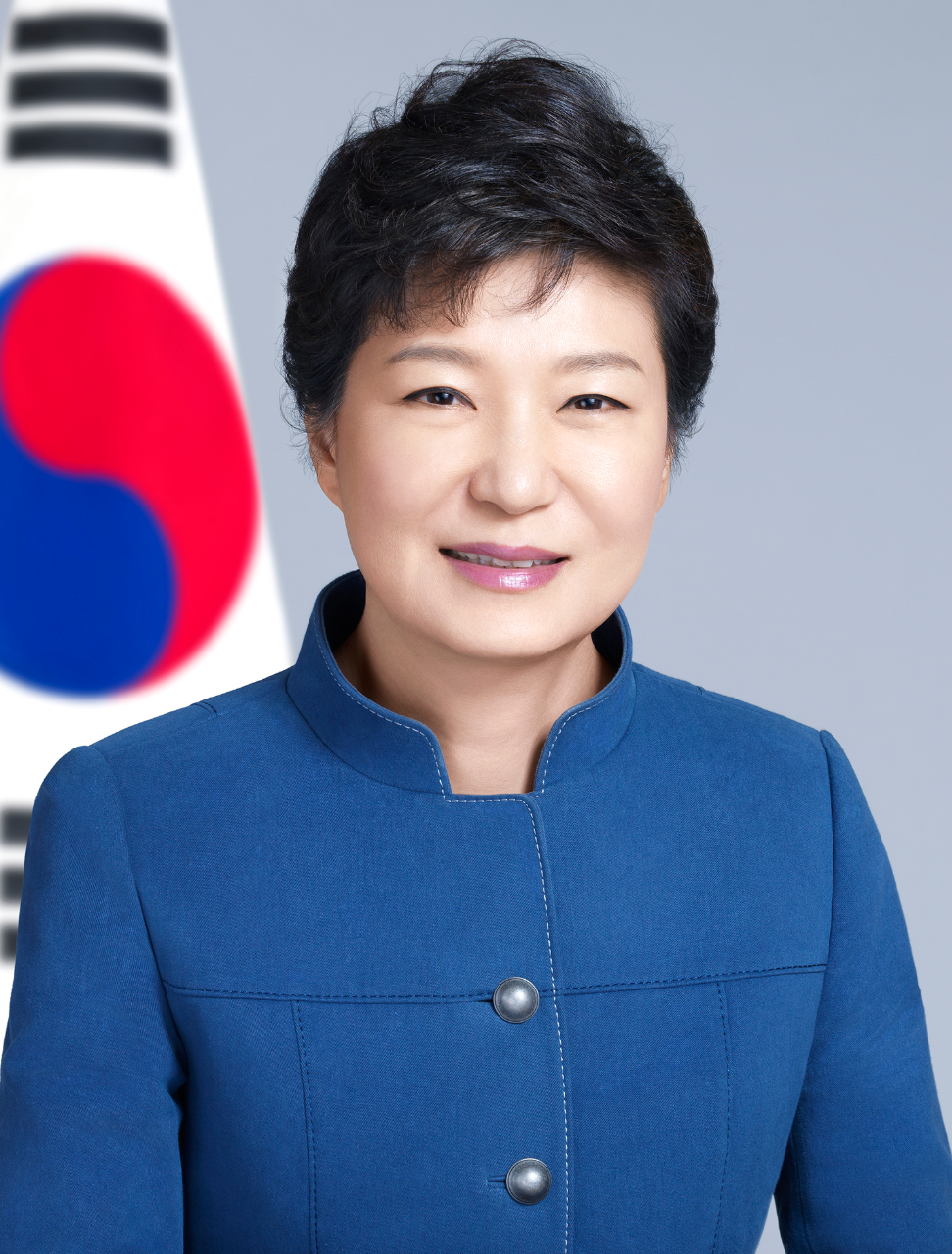

Leader of the
Grand National Party
(2004–2006)

==== Campaign ====
The first member of the Saenuri Party to officially announce their candidacy was Kim Moon-soo on 22 April. Kim, a former labor activist, stated in his announcement that he would focus on combating regional and socioeconomic divides, emphasized his commitment to a policy of multiculturalism, and argued for a revision in Saenuri's primary system. He stated further that Park Geun-hye's leadership of the party represented only an "ambiguously prevailing trend", and could not be relied upon to reach victory in the elections. Although Kim said that he was "convinced" he could "attract more support than [Park]", he was not widely expected to garner a high level of support. His early announcement was regarded as an attempt to preemptively form an anti-Park faction in the party.

Chung Mong-joon, a billionaire and longstanding member of the National Assembly, followed on 29 April. In his announcement, Chung emphasized the need to confront regionalism and factional politics, and stated that he would "write a new history of the Republic of Korea by facilitating [his] experience of managing a business, engaging in diplomacy and creating unity in the nation". He stressed that his task was to "bring together the divided hearts of the people" and that he was concerned that the "country could collapse in its current situation". Like Kim Moon-soo, Chung is expected to be at a disadvantage to Park. Chung previously declared his candidacy in the 2002 presidential elections but later dropped out to endorse Roh Moo-hyun.

The former mayor of Incheon, Ahn Sang-soo, declared his candidacy on 6 May, emphasizing his economic credentials and stating that he would relieve the burden of debt. Former presidential Chief of Staff Yim Tae-hee followed on 8 May, issuing a call for Park Geun-hye to act as a "kingmaker" that was interpreted as a request for her to step aside. Yim, a moderate, proposed to join hands with independent Ahn Cheol-soo and DUP frontrunner Moon Jae-in in a bid to "demolish outdated politics". On 10 May, five-term lawmaker and former Minister for Government Legislation and Special Affairs Lee Jae-oh announced his bid, promising to reform the constitution and cut his term as president to three years.

The campaign for the Saenuri primaries has been characterized by a dispute between Park Geun-hye, as frontrunner and party leader, and her opponents in the party. She was cited in 2009 as the most influential politician in South Korea, and has outranked other candidates in many polls throughout 2012, though as of early May 2012 she is yet to officially declare her candidacy. Park's opponents have called for Saenuri to adopt an open primary system rather than the present system based on an electoral college and opinion poll results. At the end of April the Democratic United Party suggested a joint discussion on the issue of fully open primaries. Park has been criticized for her taciturn and authoritarian style in leading the party, and Kim Moon-soo described her as overly "secretive". Chung Mong-joon stated that under Park's leadership, "democracy in the party [had] gone missing". Park strengthened her position when her ally Lee Hahn-koo was elected Saenuri's floor leader on 9 May.

During a primary debate on 7 August 2012, primary candidate Kim Tae-ho asked if Park Geun-hye would agree that the May 16 coup by her father (Park Chung Hee) was both a coup and a "necessary decision", regarding Park's previous stance that the overthrow was a "revolution to save the country". Park confirmed her stance by answering, "I don't think it's the place of politicians to be fighting over whether [the 16 May incident] were a 'coup d'etat' or a 'revolution'". She furthermore commented that "no one can refute that the events themselves did happen, whether you call them a 'coup' or a 'revolution.'" and that "we need to leave that issue" for history to decide. In addition, during another debate on 8 August 2012, the moderator asked Park the minimum hourly rate for a part-time worker as of 2012. Park replied "I think it's over 5,000 won, isn't it?," when the legal minimum wage was 4,580 won. In response, The South Korean Confederation of Trade Unions responded with a statement in which it said, "It is terribly discouraging when a person who wants to become president does not even know the country's minimum wage, which is a minimal right for survival and the first step toward a welfare state".

==== Candidates ====
- Park Geun-hye, Member of National Assembly as Proportional Representative
- Kim Moon-soo, Governor of Gyeonggi, former National Assembly Gyeonggi Bucheon Sosa
- Kim Tae-ho, Member of National Assembly from South Gyeongsang Gimhae B, former Governor of South Gyeongsang, former Mayor of Geochang
- Yim Tae-hee, former Member of National Assembly from Gyeonggi Seongnam Bundang B, former Chief of Staff to the President, former Minister of Labor
- Ahn Sang-soo, former Mayor of Incheon, former Member National Assembly Incheon Gyeyang–Ganghwa A
- Chung Mong-joon, Member of National Assembly from Seoul Dongjak B
- Lee Jae-oh, Member of National Assembly from Seoul Eunpyeong B, former Chairperson of the Anti-Corruption and Civil Rights Commission, former Minister for Special Affairs

Chung and Lee, in protest of the controversial primary rule negotiations, withdrew their bids for nomination before the convention.

==== Results ====
The official result was announced at Saenuri National Convention, which took place on 20 August 2012 at 05:40 KST, nominating Park Geun-hye as the presidential candidate for the Saenuri Party.

Candidate	Place	Votes	Percentage
Park Geun-hye	Nominated	86,589	83.97%
Kim Moon-soo	2nd	8,955	8.68%
Kim Tae-ho	3rd	3,298	3.20%
Yim Tae-hee	4th	2,676	2.69%
Ahn Sang-soo	5th	1,600	1.55%
		103,118	100.0%

=== Third parties and independent candidates ===
==== Registered ====
Lee Jung-hee (Unified Progressive Party)
Former leader of UPP and former Member of National Assembly
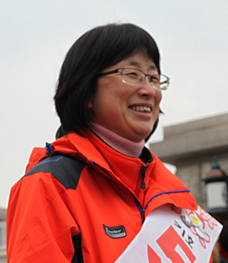
Kim So-yeon (Independent)
Elected to the Korean Confederation of Trade Unions
Kim Soon-ja (Independent)
A Cleaning worker, and New Progressive Party candidate in 2012 South Korean legislative election
Kang Ji-won (Independent)
Chairman of Korea Manifesto Center

Park Jong-sun (Independent)
A former entrepreneur

==== Withdrawn ====
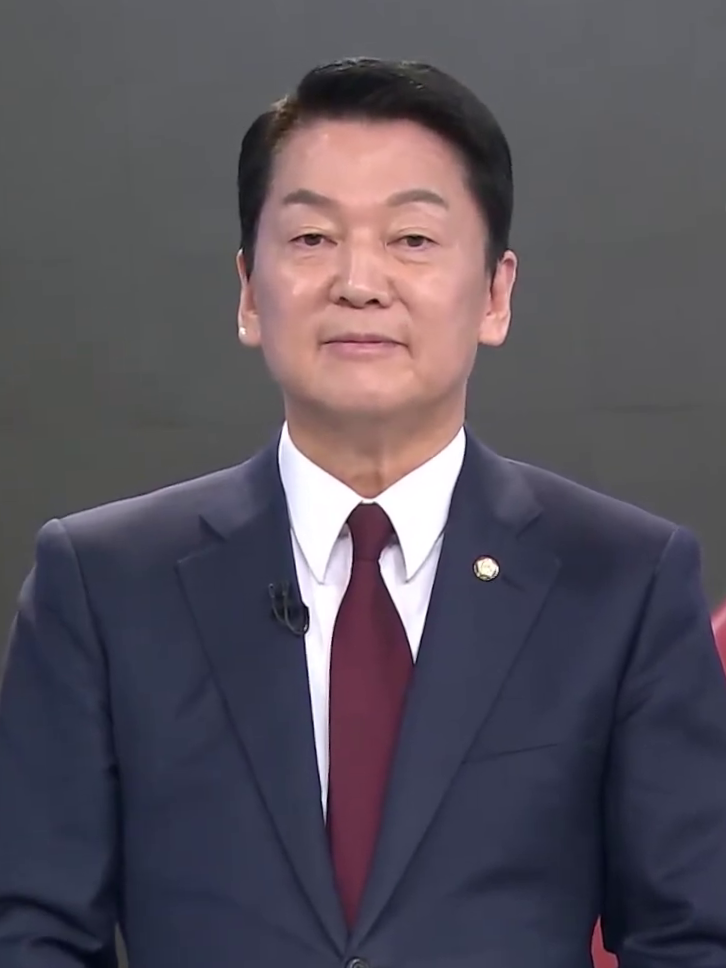
Ahn Cheol-soo
Former Dean of Seoul National University Graduate School of Convergence Science and Technology
Former chairman of software firm AhnLab Inc

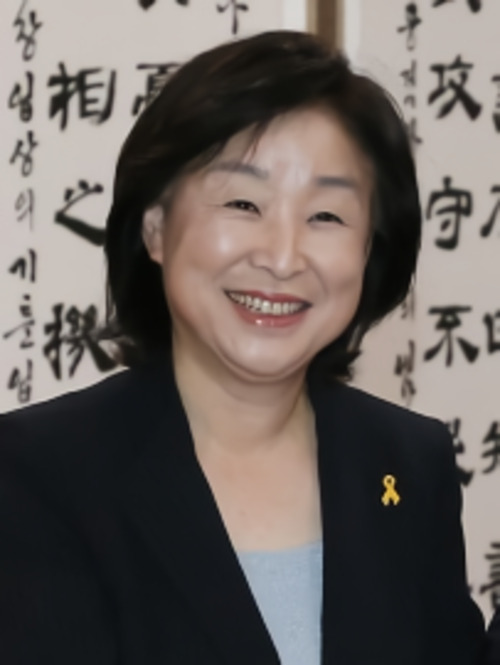
Sim Sang-jung Progressive Justice Party, endorsed Moon

Lee Gun-gae
A former National Assembly Member

== Opinion polling ==
Poll source	Date	Sample size			Margin
Poll source	Date	Sample size	Park (%) Saenuri	Moon (%) DUP	Margin
JoongAng Ilbo	19–21 July 2012	2,000	56.6	35.0	21.6
OhMyNews/Research View	16–17 July 2012	1,000	50.8	41.0	9.8
Realmeter	29 May – 1 June 2012	3,000	52.5	38.6	13.9
Hankyoreh /Korea Society Opinion Institute	26–27 May 2012		61.0	33.5	27.5
Realmeter	21–25 May 2012	3,750	52.6	37.9	14.7
JoongAng Ilbo	15 May 2012	910	57.6	33.3	24.3
Realmeter	14–18 May 2012	3,750	52.0	37.5	14.5
Realmeter	7–11 May 2012	3,750	51.9	38.2	13.7
Realmeter	7–8 May 2012	1,500	55.7	36.3	19.4
Realmeter	30 April – 4 May 2012	3,000	52.4	38.0	14.4
Realmeter	23–27 April 2012	3,750	50.9	40.3	10.6
Realmeter	6–10 February 2012	3,750	44.3	43.0	1.3
Realmeter	30 January – 3 February 2012	3,750	44.4	44.9	0.5
The Dong-A Ilbo	24 January 2012		46.7	38.4	8.3

=== Exit poll ===
KBS, MBC, and SBS Terrestrial Broadcasting Exit Survey

Candidate	Estimated percentage
Park Geun-hye	50.1%
Moon Jae-in	48.9%

== Results ==
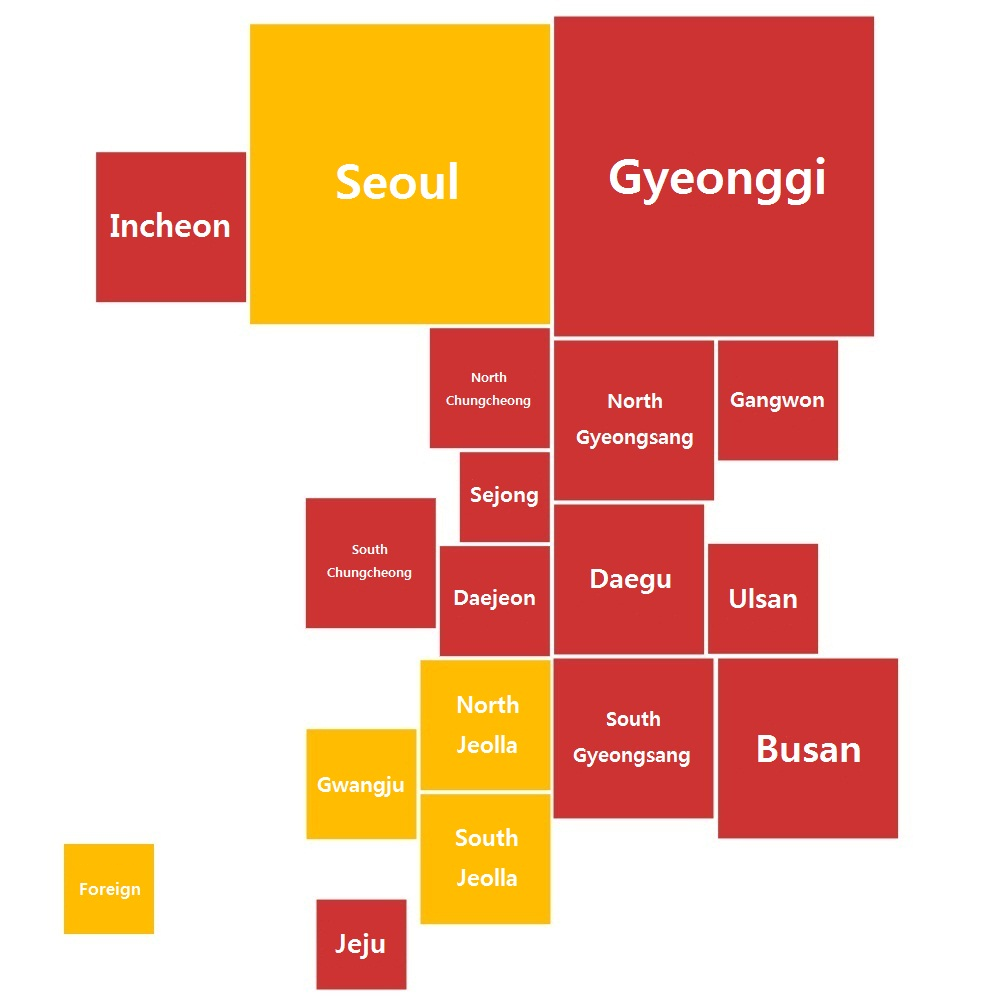
Provinces and cities won by ■ – Park Geun-hye ■ – Moon Jae-in

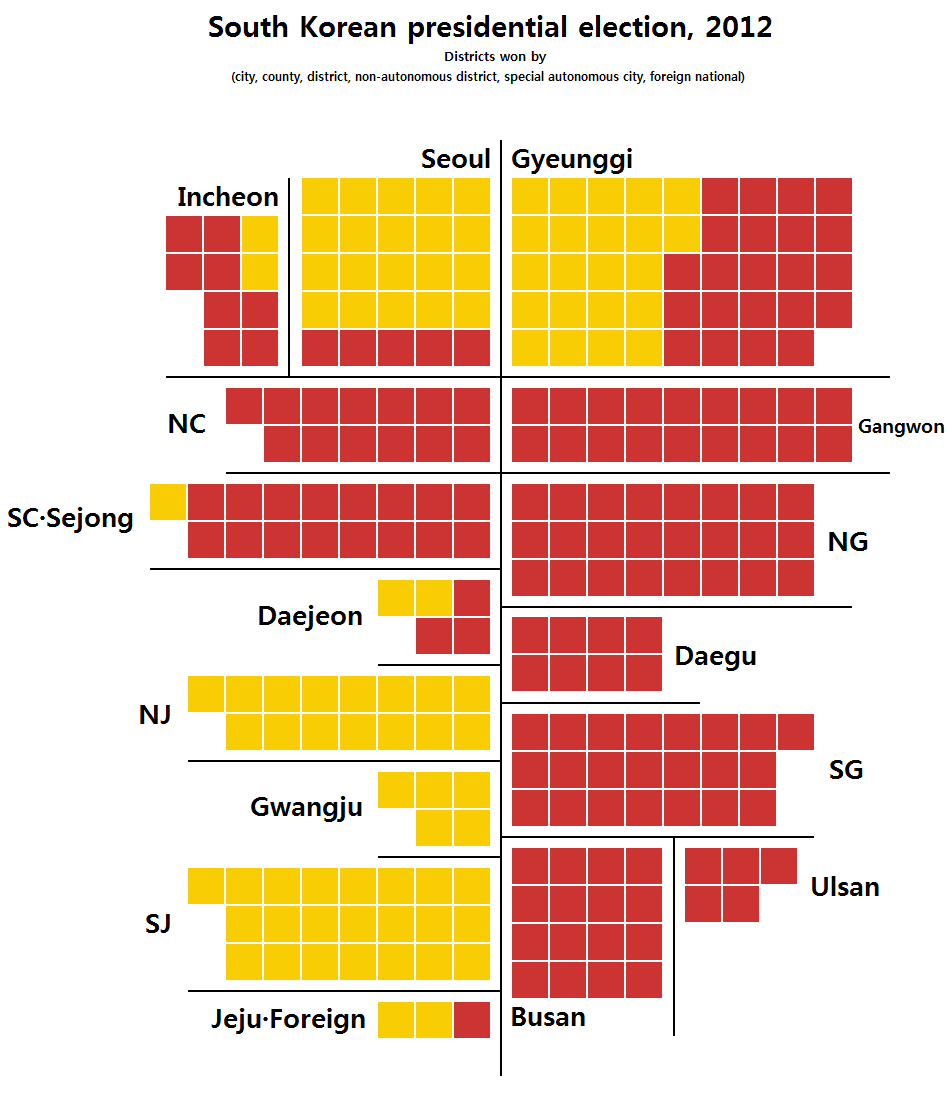
Districts won by ■ – Park Geun-hye ■ – Moon Jae-in

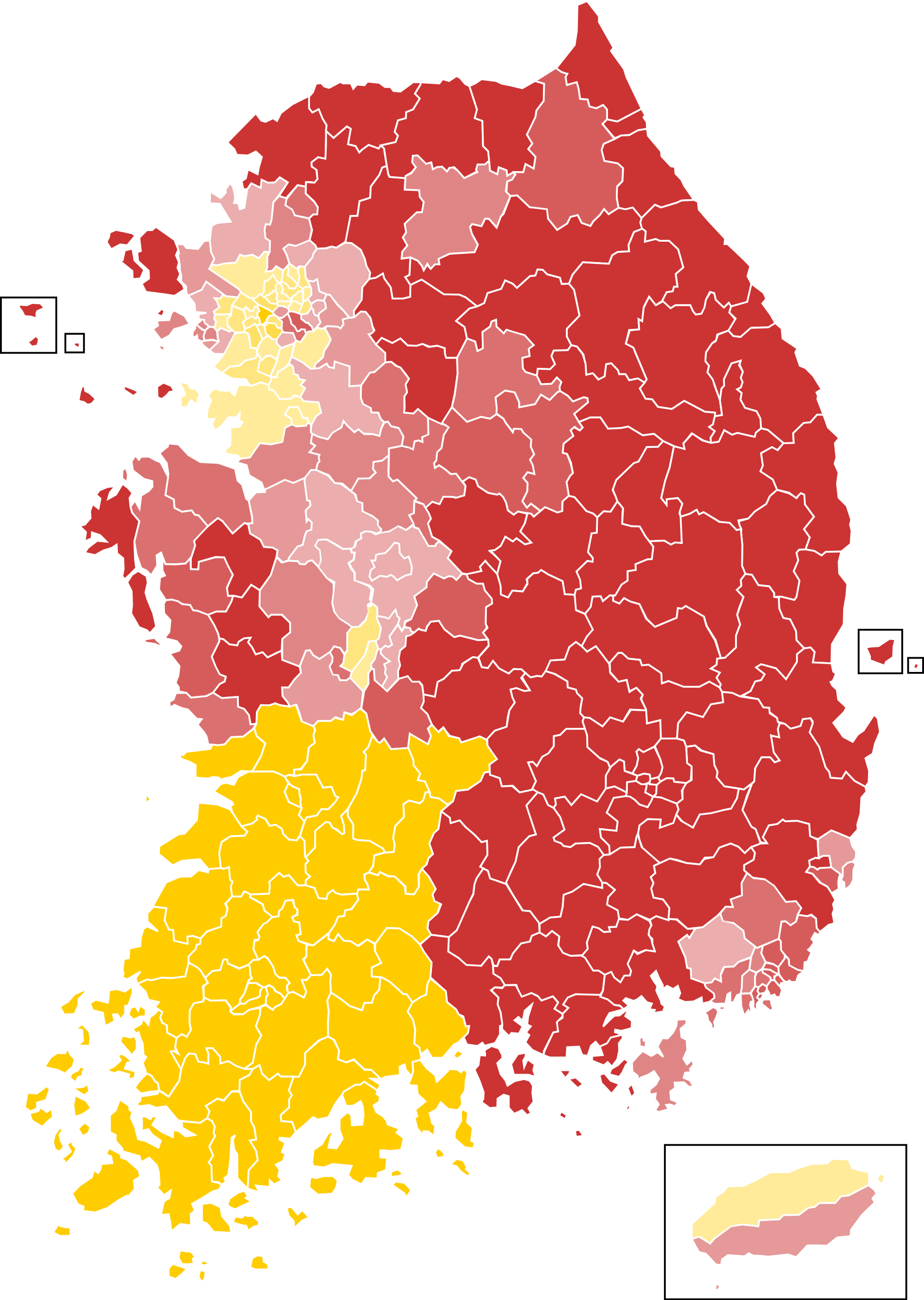
Districts won by ■ – Park Geun-hye ■ – Moon Jae-in

Districts won by ■ – Park Geun-hye ■ – Moon Jae-in

Candidate	Party	Votes	%
Park Geun-hye	Saenuri Party	15,773,128	51.56
Moon Jae-in	Democratic United Party	14,692,632	48.02
Kang Ji-won	Independent	53,303	0.17
Kim Soon-ja	Independent	46,017	0.15
Kim So-yeon	Independent	16,687	0.05
Park Jong-sun	Independent	12,854	0.04
Total		30,594,621	100.00
Valid votes		30,594,621	99.59
Invalid/blank votes		126,838	0.41
Total votes		30,721,459	100.00
Registered voters/turnout		40,507,842	75.84
Source: National Election Commission

=== By province and city ===
Province/City	Park Geun-hye		Moon Jae-in		Kang Ji-won		Kim Soon-ja		Kim So-yeon		Park Jong-sun	
Province/City	Votes	%	Votes	%	Votes	%	Votes	%	Votes	%	Votes	%
Seoul	3,024,572	48.19	3,227,639	51.42	11,829	0.19	5,307	0.08	3,793	0.06	3,559	0.06
Busan	1,324,159	59.82	882,511	39.87	2,878	0.13	2,389	0.11	913	0.04	555	0.03
Daegu	1,267,789	80.15	309,034	19.54	2,043	0.13	1,984	0.13	624	0.04	366	0.02
Incheon	852,600	51.58	794,213	48.05	2,730	0.17	1,910	0.12	1,005	0.06	508	0.03
Gwangju	69,574	7.77	823,737	91.98	1,113	0.12	561	0.06	333	0.04	268	0.03
Daejeon	450,576	49.96	448,310	49.71	1,291	0.14	969	0.11	461	0.05	271	0.03
Ulsan	413,977	59.79	275,451	39.78	898	0.13	1,463	0.21	434	0.06	210	0.03
Sejong	33,587	51.91	30,787	47.59	99	0.15	155	0.24	38	0.06	31	0.05
Gyeonggi	3,528,915	50.44	3,442,084	49.20	12,577	0.18	7,476	0.11	3,674	0.05	1,997	0.03
Gangwon	562,876	61.97	340,870	37.53	1,514	0.17	2,114	0.23	524	0.06	356	0.04
North Chungcheong	518,442	56.23	398,907	43.26	1,511	0.16	2,241	0.24	542	0.06	410	0.04
South Chungcheong	658,928	56.66	497,630	42.79	1,976	0.17	3,198	0.27	688	0.06	516	0.04
North Jeolla	150,315	13.23	980,322	86.25	3,066	0.27	1,690	0.15	702	0.06	480	0.04
South Jeolla	116,296	10.00	1,038,347	89.28	4,338	0.37	2,487	0.21	759	0.07	732	0.06
North Gyeongsang	1,375,164	80.82	316,659	18.61	2,119	0.12	5,886	0.35	873	0.05	810	0.05
South Gyeongsang	1,259,174	63.12	724,896	36.34	2,654	0.13	5,326	0.27	1,084	0.05	1,637	0.08
Jeju	166,184	50.46	161,235	48.96	667	0.20	861	0.26	240	0.07	148	0.04
Total	15,773,128	51.56	14,692,632	48.02	53,303	0.17	46,017	0.15	16,687	0.05	12,854	0.04
Source: National Election Commission

== NIS interference ==
=== Public opinion manipulation controversy ===
On 11 December 2012, the Democratic United Party claimed that agents of the Psychological Operations group in the South Korean National Intelligence Service (NIS) were influencing public opinion under orders by the NIS, by posting comments on the Internet. They followed these claims by identifying one such agent. In a police raid, that agent did not emerge from the rented office and claimed that she was not involved in such actions. Right after the last TV debate between candidates Park Geun-Hye and Moon Jae-in, police announced that no evidence was found. After Park Geun-Hye was sworn into office, evidence emerged that the agent in question and many others were involved in activities manipulating public opinion in the presidential election. On 27 May 2013 the Seoul Metropolitan Police Agency and Seoul Suseo Police Station was found to have delayed delivering evidence, and turned in fabricated laptop hard drive analysis reports. The police already had evidence that the agent in question posted political comments, the analysis report was not submitted to the Suseo Police Station and was destroyed.

In 2013, prosecutor Yoon Seok-youl led a special investigation team that looked into the National Intelligence Service (NIS)'s involvement in the scandal. Yoon sought the prosecution of the former head of the NIS, Won Sei-hoon for violating the Public Official Election Act for his role in the case. Yoon accused Park Geun-hye's Justice Minister Hwang Kyo-ahn of influencing his investigation. In February 2015, Won was convicted on charges of instructing NIS officials to manipulate internet comments and sentenced to three years in prison. However the conviction was overturned on appeal, leading to a retrial. In a second trial, Won was sentenced to four years in prison in 2017. The Supreme Court upheld the sentence in April 2018. When Moon Jae-in won the 2017 election, his administration pursued nine additional charges of political interference against Won, resulting in a subsequent 7 year jail sentence in 2020.

In August 2017, the NIS formally acknowledged that it was involved in the election manipulation after an internal inquiry. In December 2020, the National Assembly passed reforms curbing powers of the NIS, explicitly banning the agency and its employees from interfering in domestic politics.

=== Interference with overseas voters ===
In June 2021, according to a MBC News report, Won Sei-hoon pushed South Korean embassies abroad to delay issuing new passports to Korean nationals, who tend to lean liberal in order to limit their ability to vote for Moon Jae-in. A NIS whistleblower also claimed that he was tortured after objecting to the operation by being placed for several days in a small white room intended to cause sensory disorientation.
