= Park Jong-sun =

- Hangul: 박종선
- Hanja: 朴鐘善
- RR: Bak Jongseon
- MR: Pak Chongsŏn

Park Jong-sun (Korean: 박종선; born December 10, 1928) is a conservative South Korean politician who ran as an independent candidate in the 2012 presidential election, and was formerly the head of the company Samhyup.

Park has called for an industrialized Korea with an economy based on domestic demand, to stop trade with the north, and for higher taxes for the rich. He also wants to reform education to focus on personal development and revive the usage of Chinese characters.

Park Jong-sun had been a candidate in the 1992 parliamentary elections in his home district of Namhae, obtaining 0.88% of the vote.
