= Kim So-yeon (activist) =

South Korean trade unionist (born 1970)

- 김소연
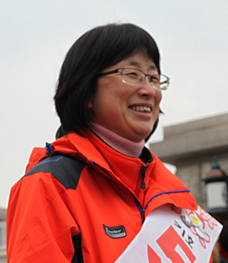
- On 3 December 2012, Kim So-Yeon stands in front of the National Assembly of the Republic of Korea
- Born: 23 January 1970 (age 56); Seoul, South Korea
- Education: Seoul Jeonghwa Girls' Commercial High School
- Occupations: Union organizer, Social Activist
- Organization(s): KCTU Metal Union Seoul Branch; KCTU Metal Union Southern Regional Branch; KCTU Metal Union Kiryung Electronics Branch
- Known for: Candidacy, 2012 South Korean presidential election
- Political party: Independent
- Board member of: Creating a World Without a Temporary Worker (Korean: 비정규직 없는 세상 만들기 네트워크), Executive Committee; Eucalyptus Electronics Union Chairperson

Korean name
- Hangul: 김소연
- Hanja: 金昭延
- RR: Gim Soyeon
- MR: Kim Soyŏn

Kim So-yeon (Korean: 김소연; born 23 January 1970) is a labor activist in South Korea and was on the executive committee of Creating a World Without a Temporary Worker (비정규직 없는 세상 만들기 네트워크) and ran as an Independent presidential candidate for the 18th Presidential Election of South Korea in 2012.

== Early Life ==
Kim's activism started in 1987 where she led the struggle for increasing accessibility to private schools in Seoul while she was attending Jeonghwa Girl's Commercial High School. She Graduated from Seoul Jeonghwa Girls' Commercial High School in 1987.Then in 1997 she Served as chairperson of the Eucalyptus Electronics Union.

In 2001 Kim was sentenced to ten months in prison with two years probation for violating the National Security Act during the Seoul Democratic Labor Convention. She was active in union organizing shortly after and on July 5 2005 was named as Korean Confederation of Trade Unions Chairperson for the newly formed Metal Union Seoul Branch, Metal Union Southern Regional Branch, and Metal Union Kiryung Electronics Branch.

== Kiryung Electronics protest ==
In 2002 Kim began working at the Kiryung Electronics factory as a temporary dispatched labourer. When she and her colleagues joined the Korean Metal Workers’ Union and requested collective bargaining, "the response they received was a “notice of dismissal” sent via a text message to their mobile phones."

On July 5 2005 Kim, along with Yoo Hyeung-hee, led a sit-in protest at the Kiryung Electronics Factory calling for the conversion of irregular workers, who were primarily women, into permanent staff. She and others were calling attention to workers who were illegally laid-off and had their union contracts withdrawn.The Ministry of Labor ruled that Kiryung Electronics had been utilizing "illegal dispatch" (hiring temporary workers for roles that should be filled by permanent staff). Instead of granting them permanent status, the company responded to their demands by filing charges of "obstruction of business" and seeking 1.3 billion won in damages and the seizure of their assets. As a result, So-yeon, one of the workers, spent nearly three months in prison. The protest lasted almost 2000 days and included a 55 day occupation of the factory and 2 hunger strikes in 2006 and 2008.

In August 2010, Kim and her fellow union activist and workers were finally successful in pushing Kiryung Electronics to create regulation for temporary workers, illegally laid-off workers and for them to embrace a high concentration of foreigners. On November 1 2010, after a negotiation period of 1895 days, Kiryung Electronics finally reaches a new full-time employment agreement with the Korean Confederation of Trade Unions (KCTU). Kiryung Electronics Director Kim Young-chang remarked, "Having gone through this for three years, I’ve come to realize just how powerful a labor union can be—strong enough to bring down a small or medium-sized enterprise." This action became a prominent symbol of the Labour movement's struggle for the rights of non-regular workers.

== Hanjin Heavy Industry strike and Creating a World Without a Temporary Worker commitee ==
From June to November 2011, Kim worked on the Hope Bus Planning Team of the 2010-11 Hanjin Heavy Industries strike. In 2012 she first served as a network executive for Creating a World Without a Temporary Worker (비정규직 없는 세상 만들기 네트워크).

== Presidential Election 2012 ==
On November 11 2012 she was elected as the presidential candidate for workers by the election headquarters of Creating a World Without a Temporary Worker. Also ran as an independent for the 2012 South Korean Presidential Election, along with Park Jong-sun, Kang Ji-won, and Kim Soon-ja. In December 2012, after completing a campaign stop at Gwanghwamun Plaza in Seoul, Kim and 300 supporters held a rally focused on labor rights, development, discrimination and war and the environment. clashed with police while marching towards the Blue House. On December 19 2012, Kim finished in 5th place in the 18th Presidential Election of South Korea.

== Kkuljam ==
In 2017, Kim established a "home for irregular workers" in Singil-dong, Yeongdeungpo-gu, Seoul, using seed money pooled together by some 2,000 workers and citizens. The name Kkuljam means 'a good nights sleep' in Korean and was established to be "a space where irregular workers could not only eat and sleep, but also put their heads together, share their concerns, and organize—a place where they could truly connect with one another." Kkuljam has been very popular and is a busy hub for not only shelter, a place for learning and organizing around labor struggles, but also for sharing food with workers and activists in the surrounding community
