= So-yeon Schröder-Kim =

South Korean interpreter (born 1970)

- 김소연
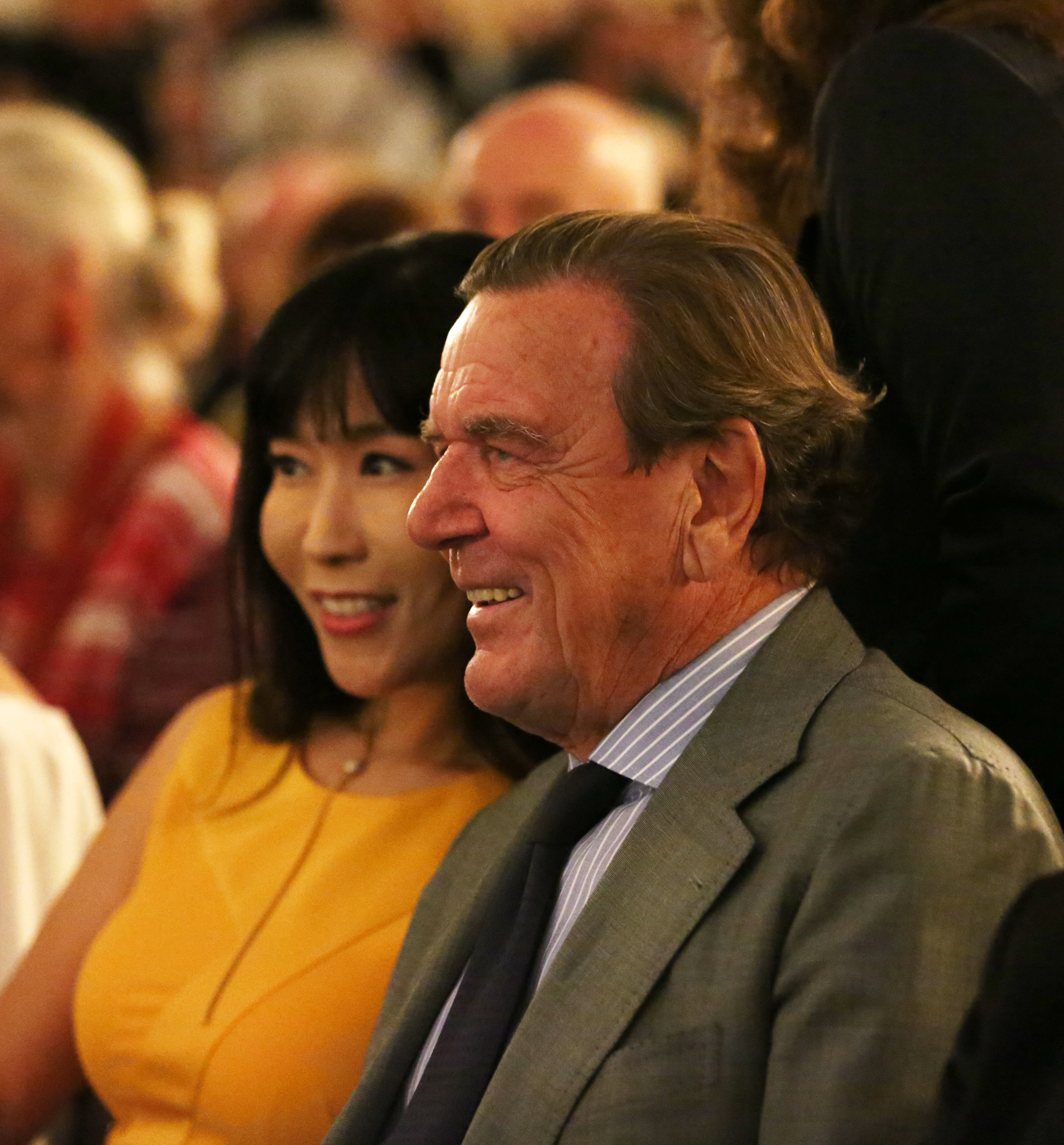
- So-yeon (left) with Gerhard (right)
- Born: Kim So-yeon; June 3, 1970 (age 55); Seoul, South Korea
- Spouse(s): Unknown (div. 2017) Gerhard Schröder (m. 2018)
- Children: 1

So-yeon Schröder-Kim (Korean: 김소연; born 3 June 1970) is a South Korean interpreter, translator, and the fifth wife of former German chancellor Gerhard Schröder.

== Career ==
Kim So-yeon was born in Seoul, South Korea in 1970. She moved to Marburg, Germany in 1995. She utilized her multilingual skills by working as a translator shortly after. She notably translated a series of books and essays about South Korean president and Nobel Peace Prize laureate Kim Dae-jung. In 2011, she was hired by NRW.INVEST, a state-owned economic development agency of North Rhine-Westphalia. She succeeded in helping more than eighty South Korean entrepreneurs branch out in the state. In 2023, she was dismissed for attending a Victory Day event in the Russian embassy in Berlin amid the Russian invasion of Ukraine. She was compensated in September of that year.

== Personal life ==
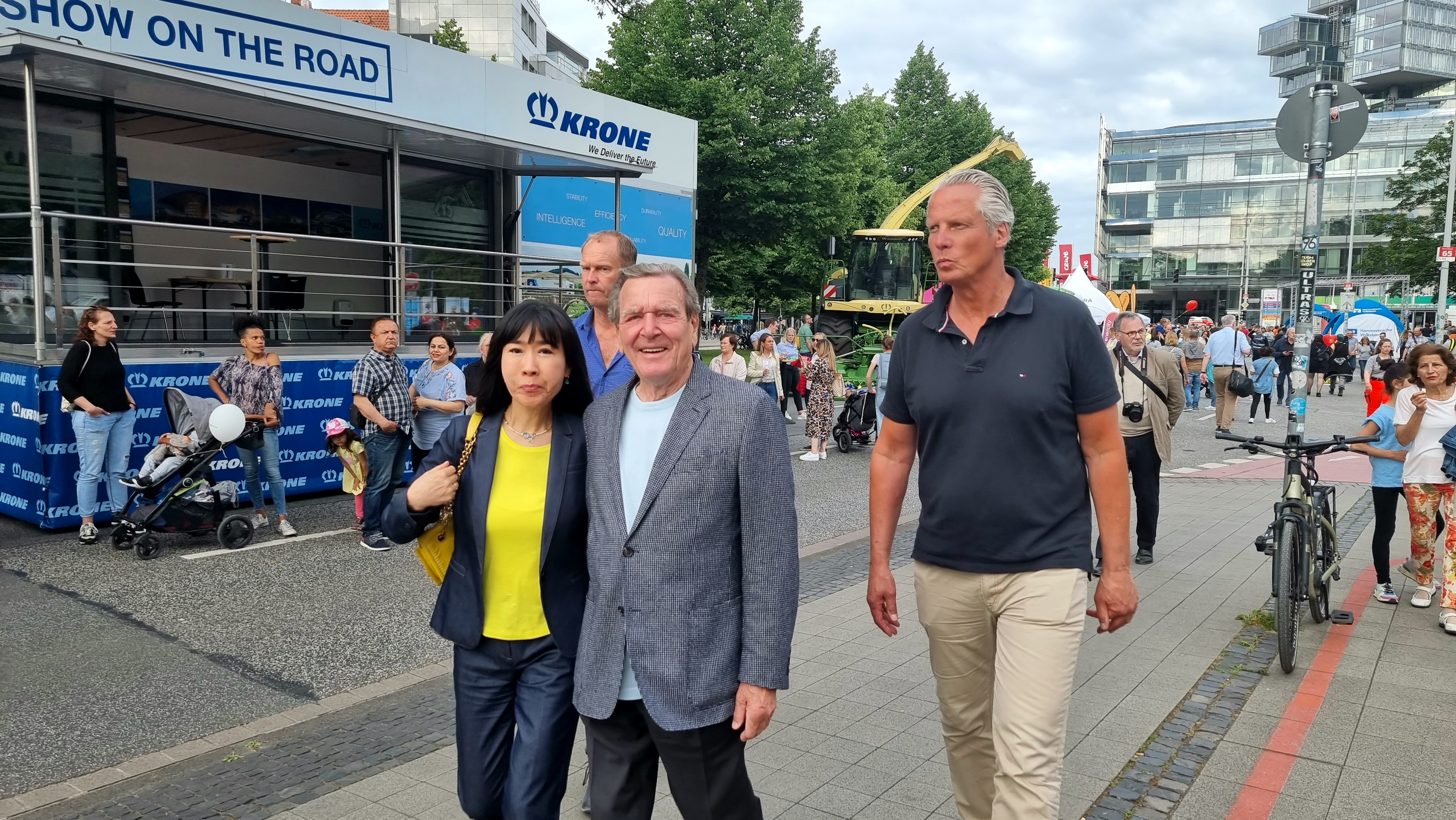
So-yeon and Gerhard Schröder, 2022

So-yeon's first marriage was to a South Korean plastic surgeon, with whom she had a daughter. They divorced in 2017. She then married former German chancellor Gerhard Schröder in 2018. Gerhard had served as chancellor from 1998 to 2005 as a member of the SPD. They met in 2015. So-yeon translated Gerhard's autobiography into Korean. They live in Hannover and Seoul. Her first husband filed a lawsuit, alleging an affair.

She is fluent in German and Japanese, as well as her native Korean. She is a devout Christian.
