= Kim So-yeon (writer) =

South Korean poet (born 1967)

Kim So Yeon
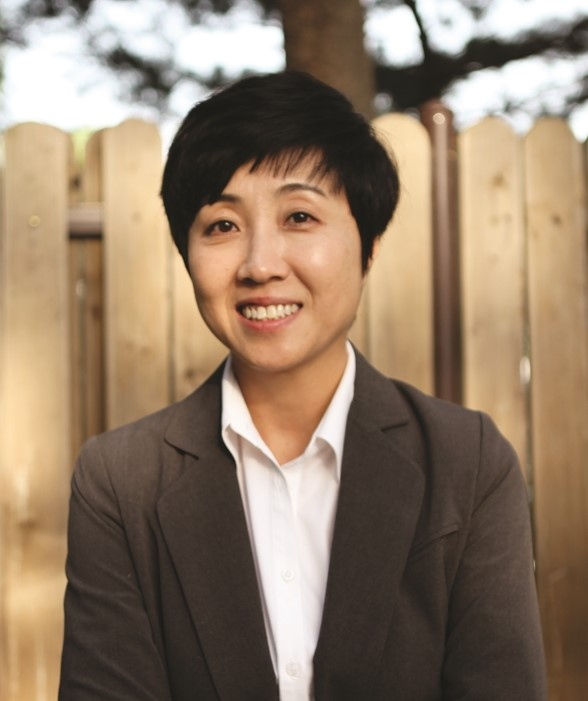
- Occupation: Writer
- Writing career
- Genre: Poetry

Kim So Yeon (Korean: 김소연; born 1967) is a South Korean poet. In 1993, she published her first poem "Urineun chanyanghanda" (우리는 찬양한다 We Praise) in the journal Poetry & Thought.

== Biography ==
Kim So Yeon was born in Gyeongju, South Korea in 1967. She studied Korean literature at the Catholic University of Korea, where she also earned her master's degree. She has taught poetry at the Seoul Institute of the Arts and Korea National University of Arts, where a number of her students have gone onto become professional poets. She was a part of a literary circle called 21-segijeonmang ("21st century outlook"), which was formed in 1989 and included fellow South Korean poets Jin I-jeong, Yoo Ha, Cha Chang-ryong, and Ham Min Bok.

She published four poetry collections: Geuge dalhada (극에 달하다 Pushed to the Limit) in 1996; Bitdeurui pigoni bameul kkeureodanginda (빛들의 피곤이 밤을 끌어당긴다 The Exhaustion of Stars Pulls the Night) in 2006; Nunmuriraneun ppyeo (눈물이라는 뼈 Bones Called Tears) in 2009; and Suhakjaui achim (수학자의 아침 A Mathematician's Morning) in 2013. She gained wider recognition with the success of her 2008 essay collection Maeum sajeon (마음사전 Dictionary of the Mind).

Kim has also been noted for her activism. She signed the Writers' Declaration 6.9, which petitioned the South Korean government to investigate the deaths of six people during a police raid in 2009, an incident known in South Korea as the Yongsan Tragedy. Kim also participated in the writing and production of Gulttuk Shinmun, a newspaper dedicated to the controversial mass layoffs conducted by Ssangyong Motor Company in 2009. More recently, she was an active member of "With No References," a project to help victims of sex crimes reported within South Korean literary circles.

Kim won the 10th Nojak Literature Prize in 2010, the 57th Hyundae Literary Award in 2011, and the 12th Yi Yuksa Poetry Award in 2015.

== Writing ==
Kim So Yeon's poetry often describes the physical experience of pain in youth. This characteristic is particularly evident in her first poetry collection. The poems are filled with the sense of fatigue, futility, loneliness, and emptiness one feels when looking back on past hardships. Her third poetry collection Nunmuriraneun ppyeo (눈물이라는 뼈 Bones Called Tears) is also replete with such lyricism. Literary critic Park Sang-su has called Kim "a martyr of tears." In her recent work, Kim does not simply present sadness as a personal condition, but as a potentially communal experience. Her poetry sits somewhere between conventional lyric poetry and avant-garde poetry, which was popular among young South Korean poets in the 2000s.

Kim's fourth poetry collection Suhakjaui achim (수학자의 아침 A Mathematician's Morning) won the 12th Yi Yuksa Poetry Award and received the following commentary from the judges: "Using language that alternates between refreshingly lucid and boldly convoluted, Kim bridges the gap between the older generation who fought for a reason and the younger generation who clamor without a reason."

== Works ==
Poetry Collections

1. 『극에 달하다』(문학과지성사, 1996) { Pushed to the Limit. Moonji, 1996. }

2. 『빛들의 피곤이 밤을 끌어당긴다』(민음사, 2006) { The Exhaustion of Stars Pulls the Night. Minumsa, 2006. }

3. 『눈물이라는 뼈』(문학과지성사, 2009) { Bones Called Tears. Moonji, 2009. }

4. 『수학자의 아침』(문학과지성사, 2013) { A Mathematician's Morning. Moonji, 2013. }

Essay Collections

1. 『마음사전』(마음산책, 2008) { Dictionary of the Mind. Maumsanchaek, 2008. }

2. 『시옷의 세계』(마음산책, 2012) { The World of Siot. Maumsanchaek, 2012. }

=== Works in translation ===
1. "Oh, Bartleby," "Shadow," "The Pit," "Opposites," "A Blanket's Insomnia," "The River and I" in The Colors of Dawn: Twentieth-Century Korean Poetry (MANOA 27-2)[1] (University of Hawaii Press, 2016) (English)

2. AZALEA (Journal of Korean Literature & Culture) : Volume Eight (English)

=== Excerpt ===
==== Dictionary of the Mind ====
Loneliness

The word "lonely" is not an adjective. It is an action verb that moves energetically. People seek the words "I'm lonely" when they can no longer bear how empty they feel, and then release the words. Already within loneliness is a stirring energy unable to cope with itself. That energy transforms the state of loneliness into an action verb.

Melancholy

Compared to the word loneliness, "melancholy" reacts more to the environment outside the self than to the inner self. More precisely, it is a reaction to the relationship between the mind and the environment outside the self. If loneliness gazes at its surroundings, melancholy investigates those surroundings. After investigating what surrounds the heart, the drop in the heart's temperature as it absorbs the environment's own low temperature—that is melancholy.

- Translated by Krys Lee

== Awards ==
1. 2010: 10th Nojak Literature Prize

2. 2011: 57th Hyundae Literary Award

3. 2015: 12th Yi Yuksa Poetry Award
