= Frank-Walter Steinmeier =

President of Germany since 2017

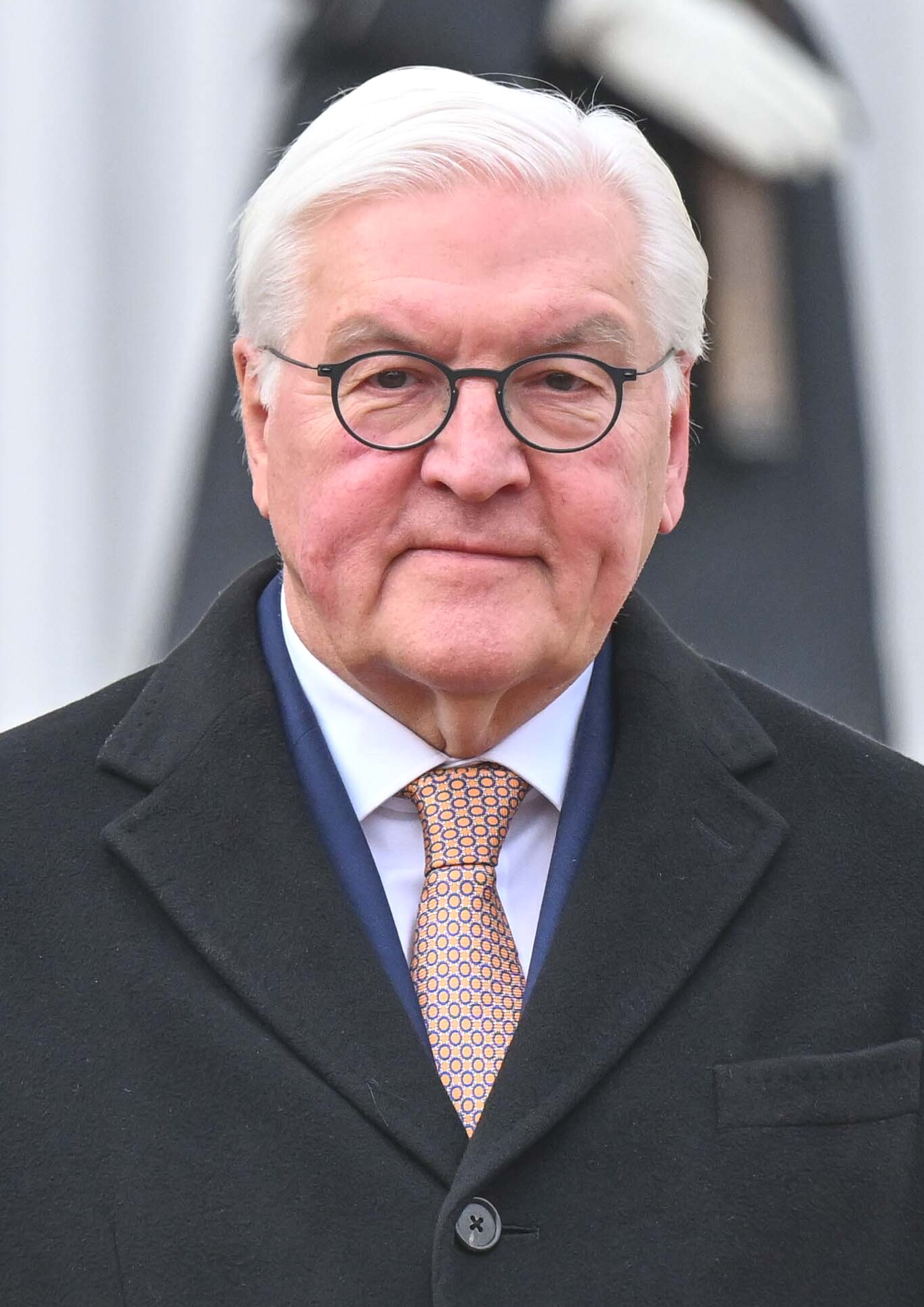
- Steinmeier in 2026

President of Germany
- Incumbent
- Assumed office 19 March 2017
- Chancellor: Angela Merkel; Olaf Scholz; Friedrich Merz
- Preceded by: Joachim Gauck

Vice-Chancellor of Germany
- In office 21 November 2007 – 27 October 2009
- Chancellor: Angela Merkel
- Preceded by: Franz Müntefering
- Succeeded by: Guido Westerwelle

Minister for Foreign Affairs
- In office 17 December 2013 – 27 January 2017
- Chancellor: Angela Merkel
- Preceded by: Guido Westerwelle
- Succeeded by: Sigmar Gabriel
- In office 22 November 2005 – 27 October 2009
- Chancellor: Angela Merkel
- Preceded by: Joschka Fischer
- Succeeded by: Guido Westerwelle

Leader of the Opposition
- In office 28 October 2009 – 16 December 2013 (Note: Steinmeier donated one of his kidneys to his end-stage kidney disease-stricken wife in August 2010. From 23 August to 26 October 2010, while he recovered from the procedure, senior SPD Bundestag member Joachim Poß served as interim Bundestag leader in his absence.)
- Chancellor: Angela Merkel
- Preceded by: Guido Westerwelle
- Succeeded by: Gregor Gysi
Party political offices
Leader of the Social Democratic Party in the Bundestag
In office 29 September 2009 – 16 December 2013
First secretary	Thomas Oppermann
Preceded by	Peter Struck
Succeeded by	Thomas Oppermann
Leader of the Social Democratic Party
Acting; 7 September 2008 – 18 October 2008
Deputy	Andrea Nahles; Peer Steinbrück; Himself
Preceded by	Kurt Beck
Succeeded by	Franz Müntefering
Deputy Leader of the Social Democratic Party
In office 26 October 2007 – 13 November 2009
Leader	Kurt Beck; Himself (acting); Franz Müntefering
Preceded by	Bärbel Dieckmann
Succeeded by	Olaf Scholz
Political civil servant
Head of the Chancellery
In office 31 July 1999 – 22 November 2005
Chancellor	Gerhard Schröder
Preceded by	Bodo Hombach
Succeeded by	Thomas de Maizière
State Secretary at the Chancellery Commissioner for the Federal Intelligence Services
In office 27 October 1998 – 22 November 2005
Chancellor	Gerhard Schröder
Preceded by	Bernd Schmidbauer (as Minister of State)
Succeeded by	Thomas de Maizière
Head of the State Chancellery of Lower Saxony
In office 30 October 1996 – 27 October 1998
Minister-President	Gerhard Schröder
Preceded by	Willi Waike
Succeeded by	Peter-Jürgen Steiner
Parliamentary constituencies
Member of the Bundestag; for Brandenburg an der Havel – Potsdam-Mittelmark I – Havelland III – Teltow-Fläming I
In office 27 October 2009 – 19 March 2017
Preceded by	Margrit Spielmann
Succeeded by	Angelika Krüger-Leißner

Personal details
- Born: 5 January 1956 (age 70) Detmold, West Germany
- Party: Social Democratic
- Spouse: Elke Büdenbender (m. 1995)
- Children: 1
- Education: University of Giessen

Military service
- Branch/service: Bundeswehr
- Years of service: 1974–1976
- Unit: German Air Force

Frank-Walter Steinmeier (German: [ˈfʁaŋkˌvaltɐ ˈʃtaɪnˌmaɪ.ɐ]; born 5 January 1956) is a German politician who has served as President of Germany since 2017. He was previously Minister for Foreign Affairs from 2005 to 2009 and again from 2013 to 2017, as well as Vice-Chancellor of Germany from 2007 to 2009. Steinmeier was Chairman-in-Office of the Organization for Security and Co-operation in Europe (OSCE) in 2016.

Steinmeier is a member of the Social Democratic Party of Germany (SPD), holds a doctorate in law, and was formerly a career civil servant. He was a close aide of Gerhard Schröder when Schröder was Minister-President of Lower Saxony during most of the 1990s, and served as Schröder's chief of staff from 1996. When Schröder became Chancellor of Germany in 1998, Steinmeier was appointed Under-Secretary of State in the German Chancellery with responsibility for the intelligence services. From 1999 to 2005, he served as Chief of Staff of the Chancellery.

Following the 2005 federal election, Steinmeier became Foreign Minister in the first grand coalition government of Angela Merkel, and from 2007 he additionally held the office of vice chancellor. In 2008, he briefly served as acting chairman of his party. He was the SPD's candidate for Chancellor in the 2009 federal election, but his party lost the election and he left the federal cabinet to become leader of the opposition. Following the 2013 federal election, he again became Minister for Foreign Affairs in Merkel's second grand coalition. In November 2016, the governing CDU/CSU-SPD coalition, which held a large majority in the Federal Convention, nominated him as candidate for President of Germany. He left the cabinet on 27 January 2017. He was elected president by the Federal Convention on 12 February 2017 with 74% of the vote. On 13 February 2022, he was re-elected by the Federal Convention for a second and final term with 78% of the vote.

Steinmeier is known as a reform-minded moderate within the SPD. As chief of staff, he was a principal architect of Agenda 2010, the Schröder government's reforms of the welfare state. His lenient, Realpolitik-driven policies toward authoritarian nations like Russia and China have drawn criticism both within Germany and across the liberal democratic world. Furthermore, critics have labeled him a corporatist for prioritizing German business interests over human rights.

== Personal life ==
=== Early life and education ===
Steinmeier was born in 1956 in Detmold. Although his full name is Frank-Walter, his friends call him Frank. His father, Walter Steinmeier (1928–2012), was a carpenter affiliated with the Church of Lippe (one of Germany's few Calvinist regional church bodies, and a member church of the Protestant Church in Germany). His mother, Ursula Steinmeier, born in Breslau (now Wrocław, Poland), came as a refugee from a Lutheran part of Silesia during the flight and expulsion of Germans after World War II.

Following his Abitur, Steinmeier completed 15 months of military service with the German Air Force in Goslar from 1974 to 1976. He then studied law and political science at the Justus Liebig University Giessen, where Brigitte Zypries was a fellow student. In 1982, Steinmeier passed his first and in 1986 his second state examination in law. He worked as a scientific assistant to the professor of public law and political science at Giessen University until he obtained his doctorate in law in 1991. Steinmeier's dissertation explored the state's role in preventing homelessness.

=== Family life ===
Steinmeier is married to Elke Büdenbender and has one daughter. On 24 August 2010, he donated a kidney to his wife.

In 2015, Steinmeier served as best man at the wedding of Rüdiger Grube and Cornelia Poletto in Hamburg.

=== Interests ===
Steinmeier enjoys jazz, and is an avid football fan.

=== Religion ===
Steinmeier is a Reformed Protestant and an active member of the Reformed Bethlehem congregation in Neukölln. He was baptised into his father's church (the Church of Lippe) as a youth.

=== Early career ===
Steinmeier became an adviser in 1991 for the Law of Communication media and media guidelines in the State Chancellery of Lower Saxony in Hanover. In 1993, he became director of the Personal Office for the prime minister of Lower Saxony, Gerhard Schröder. In 1996, he became the Secretary of State and head of the State Chancellery of Lower Saxony.

== Political career at the federal level ==
=== Schröder Federal Chancellery (1998–2005) ===
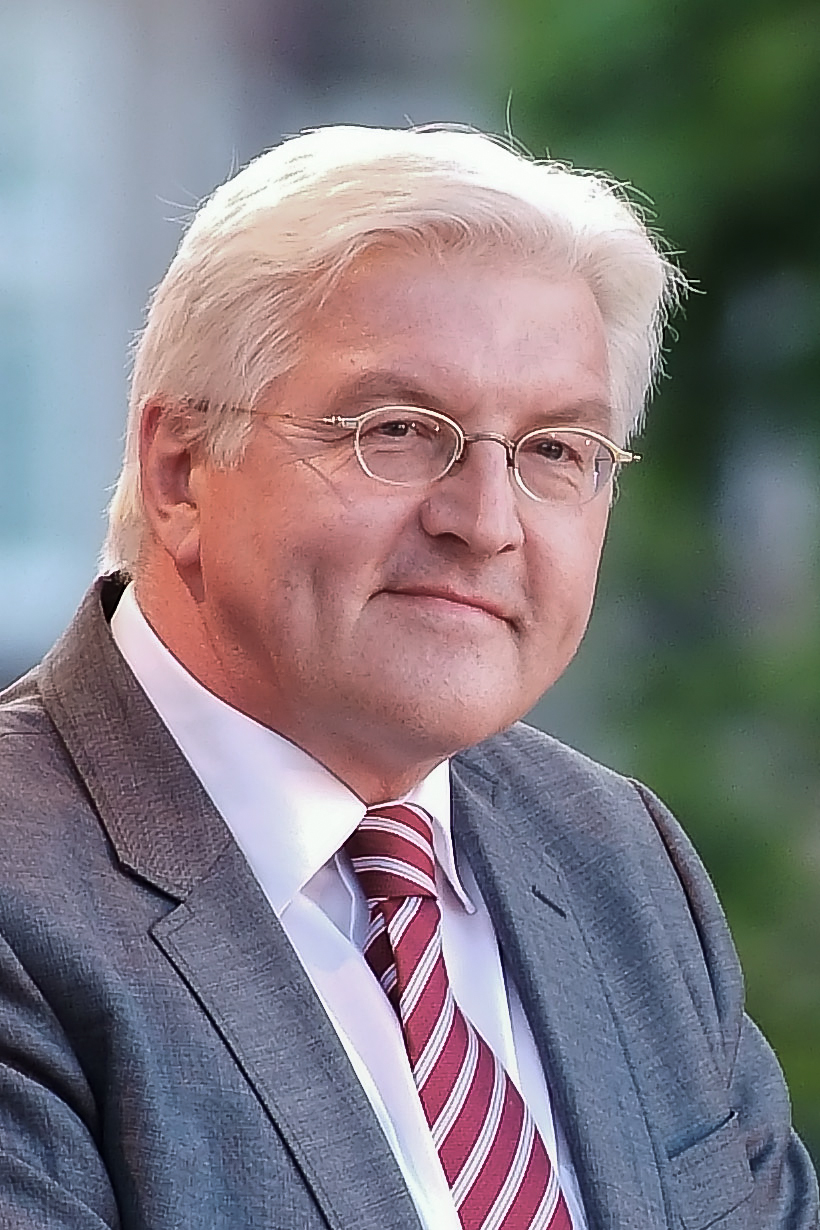
Steinmeier in 2009

In November 1998, Steinmeier was appointed as Secretary of State, a junior Chancellery bureaucrat, and Commissioner for the Federal Intelligence Services at the office of the chancellor following Schröder's election victory. He replaced Bodo Hombach as the head of the office of the chancellor in 1999, after the latter entered European Union politics. He retained his Secretary of State rank and therefore was the only Head of the Chancellery to not be appointed Minister for Special Affairs, i. e. not to have cabinet rank, from 1984 to today. During this period, Steinmeier was also one of the advisors to Schröder. He was crucial in securing a red-green majority in parliament for Schröder's contentious "Agenda 2010" of economic reforms. Because of his effective management beyond the spotlight of politics, he was nicknamed Die Graue Effizienz (lit. 'the grey efficiency') – a pun on Graue Eminenz, the German for grey eminence.

As Commissioner for the Federal Intelligence Services (a title often held by the Head of the Chancellery), Steinmeier was responsible for coordinating Germany's intelligence services. In 2003, he supported Schröder in his controversial decision to forge a coalition with Russia and France against the U.S.-led war against Iraq. Meanwhile, he approved the decision to install a German intelligence officer in the Qatar-based office of General Tommy Franks, the American commander of the U.S. invasion in Iraq, who passed on to the United States information being gathered in Baghdad by two German intelligence officers operating there.

In 2004, Steinmeier participated in diplomatic negotiations settling on compensation payments with Libya for victims of the 1986 terrorist bombing of the LaBelle disco in Berlin.

A major controversy during Steinmeier's term as chief of staff was the imprisonment of a German-born Turk, Murat Kurnaz, in Guantánamo Bay from 2002 until August 2006. Steinmeier denied during a parliamentary inquiry in March 2007 that he had blocked Kurnaz's release. Instead, he claimed that Berlin had feared Kurnaz was a threat and should go to Turkey, not Germany, if released. Only after Merkel's election was Kurnaz released and brought back to Germany.

=== First term as Foreign Minister (2005–2009) ===
On 22 November 2005, after the 2005 federal elections, Steinmeier became Minister of Foreign Affairs in the Grand coalition cabinet led by Angela Merkel. He was the first SPD Foreign Minister since Willy Brandt (1966–1969).

Upon taking office, Steinmeier led the preparations for Germany taking over the rotating presidency of the Council of the European Union in the first half of 2007.

Following Franz Müntefering's departure from the cabinet on 21 November 2007, Steinmeier also filled the position of Vice-Chancellor.

During his time in office, Steinmeier was widely regarded as having good working relations with Angela Merkel, but often took a different stance on foreign affairs. By and large, he allowed Merkel to set the pace in foreign policy, working harmoniously with her on a range of foreign policy issues, from confronting Iran over its nuclear program to negotiating binding goals to combat climate change. In one significant foreign policy disagreement, Steinmeier held in 2009 that Germany should by 2013 lay the groundwork for withdrawing its troops from Afghanistan, a deployment that around two-thirds of Germans opposed by then. Unlike Merkel, he also favoured Turkish entry into the European Union.

Also, Steinmeier became known for his rather Russia-friendly stance, arguing strenuously for engagement with the increasingly assertive power to the east, rather than its isolation. He formulated a policy toward Russia deliberately reminiscent of "Ostpolitik", the eastward-facing policy pioneered by Chancellor Willy Brandt in the early 1970s. Together with Gernot Erler, the SPD's leading Russia expert and the deputy foreign minister, Steinmeier in 2008 initiated Germany's so-called Partnership for Modernization with Russia, which became an official EU policy in 2010.

Pressed by lawmakers to say more on his attitude toward Russia in the wake of the high-profile murders of opposition figures Anna Politkovskaya and Alexander Litvinenko at a January 2007 hearing at the European Parliament, Steinmeier stated that "[t]here is a certain trend toward [media] hysterics and one needs to get a sense of reason back into the debate".

Dr Frank Umbach had warned as early as February 2006 that Germany had become too dependent on Russia but Steinmeier, citing the new Ostpolitik, disregarded him. In March 2007, Steinmeier published a long article in reply to Umbach explaining his rationale on the EU being such an exceptional role model on international cooperation that Putinite Russia would unavoidably get "like us" by mere "intertwining of interests" (Verflechtung), and also that "a pan-European peace order and a lasting solution to important security problems (...) can only be achieved with Russia, not without it or even against it". Steinmeier helped to admit Putin's Russia into the World Trade Organization (WTO), which occurred in 2011.

On 18 December 2007, Steinmeier and Dmitry Medvedev signed an agreement on behalf of BASF to exploit another gas field. At the time, 40% of German demand was satisfied by Russian supply.

Steinmeier went with Merkel to the 21st NATO Summit in Bucharest, and they formed a common front with French president Nicolas Sarkozy to block the proposal backed by U.S. president George W. Bush and Eastern European leaders of accession of Georgia and Ukraine to membership in the organization, with the intent of keeping good relations with the Kremlin.

In May 2008, he became the first foreign official to hold talks with President Dmitri Medvedev and Prime Minister Vladimir Putin after they took up their new positions following the 2008 Russian presidential election.

In 2006, Foreign Affairs published an analysis of the state of US and Russian nuclear forces, concluding that post-Cold War US nuclear forces seemed designed to carry out a preemptive strike against Russia or China and that the planned missile defense would be valuable primarily in an offensive context as an adjunct to a US first-strike capability. The article elicited a semi-official Russian response from ex-PM Yegor Gaidar in the Financial Times a few days later. In 2007, the US government was reportedly deeply irritated, although publicly silent, about Steinmeier, who had sounded supportive of Russian accusations that a planned US missile defense complex in Poland would upset the strategic balance in Europe – and who then left without challenge Russian General Nikolai Solovtsov's threat of retaliation against Poland and the Czech Republic if they deployed U.S. defensive systems.

Russian opposition activists later celebrated when Steinmeier and the SDP lost the 2009 election, signaling their discontent with Steinmeier. Oleg Petrovich Orlov, head of the Memorial human rights group, said that Steinmeier had prolonged Schröder's policies on Russia and that Germany's policies were "extremely bad for civil society, democracy and the country as a whole".

In February 2009, Steinmeier became the first member of Merkel's cabinet to be received by the incoming Obama administration.

During his time in office, Steinmeier managed to extract German hostages from Iraq and Yemen. In 2007, he also succeeded in securing the release of a German citizen who was imprisoned in Iran for illegally entering the country's waters on a fishing expedition.

Steinmeier served as acting chairman of the SPD from 7 September 2008 to 18 October 2008. Domestically, throughout his term, he was the only major politician with approval ratings consistently as high as or higher than Merkel's. This was helped by the especially high ratings foreign ministers generally receive in Germany.

=== Opposition leader (2009–2013) ===
Steinmeier at the Munich Security Conference in 2011

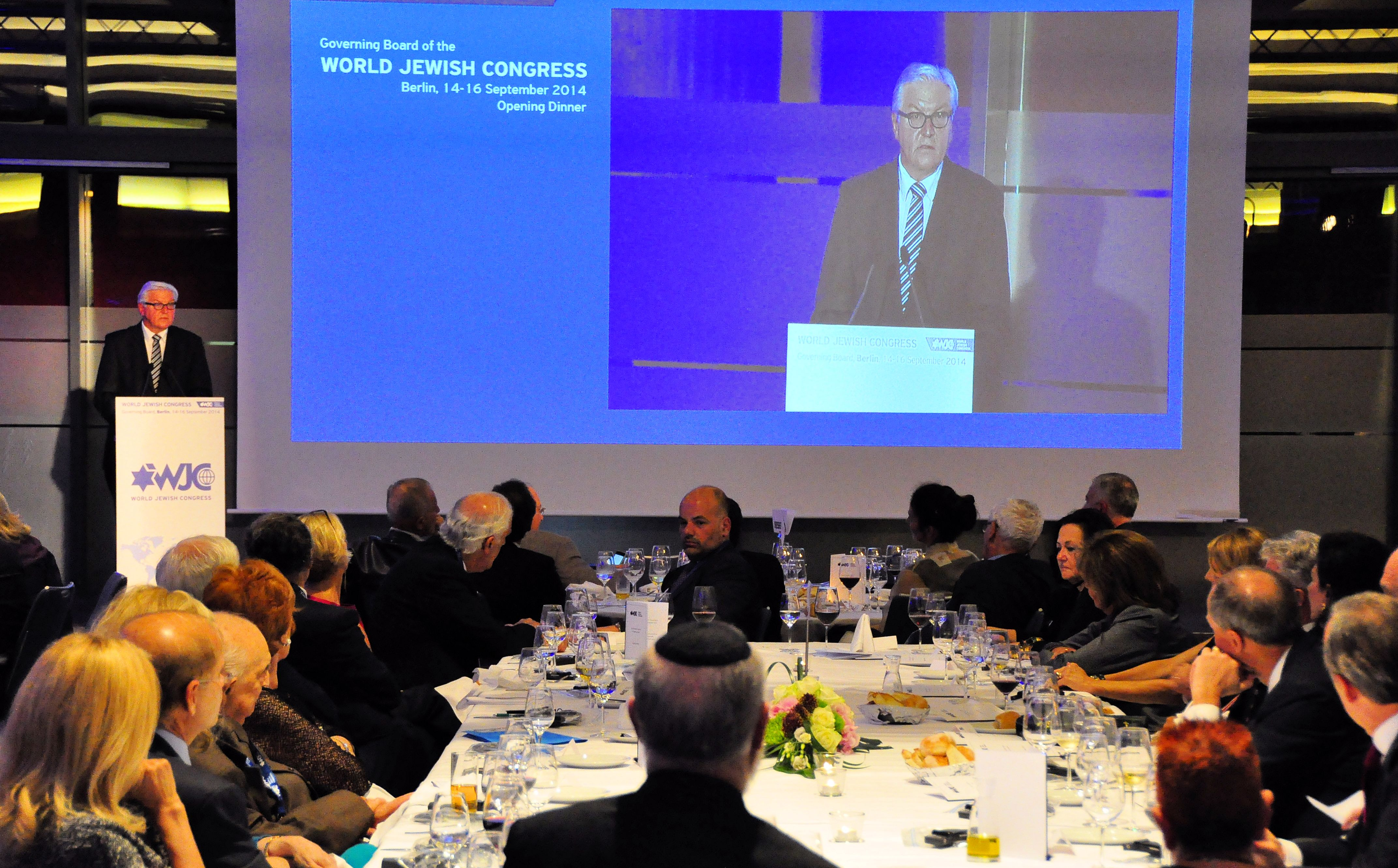
Germany's Foreign Minister Frank-Walter Steinmeier addressing a dinner of the World Jewish Congress in Berlin, September 2014

On 7 September 2008, following the resignation of SPD chairman Kurt Beck, Steinmeier was chosen as the SPD candidate for chancellor for the 2009 federal elections and also designated as acting SPD Chairman, pending the return of Müntefering to that position. In his election campaign, he argued for new tax rules to deter high executive pay and bonuses, and for minimum wages to slow the growing gap between Germany's highest and lowest earners. He also focused on improving public healthcare.

After the SPD's decisive defeat in the elections – the party's worst performance since World War II by then – Steinmeier, who had been elected to represent Brandenburg an der Havel – Potsdam-Mittelmark I – Havelland III – Teltow-Fläming I, was elected Peter Struck's successor as chairman of the SPD's parliamentary group in the Bundestag, and as such leader of the opposition. After a hospitalisation for donating a kidney to his wife in August 2010, Steinmeier returned to his office in October 2010.

During his time as leader of the parliamentary opposition, Steinmeier regularly accused Angela Merkel's government of increasing the national debt and pandering to the rich. In 2011, Steinmeier argued that Merkel's decision to appoint her economics adviser, Jens Weidmann, to be the next head of the Bundesbank undermined the political independence and public trust in the German central bank.

In late 2012, Steinmeier was once again considered a possible candidate to challenge Chancellor Angela Merkel in the 2013 general election, but soon withdrew from the contest. As a consequence, SPD leadership nominated Peer Steinbrück.

=== Second term as Foreign Minister (2013–2017) ===
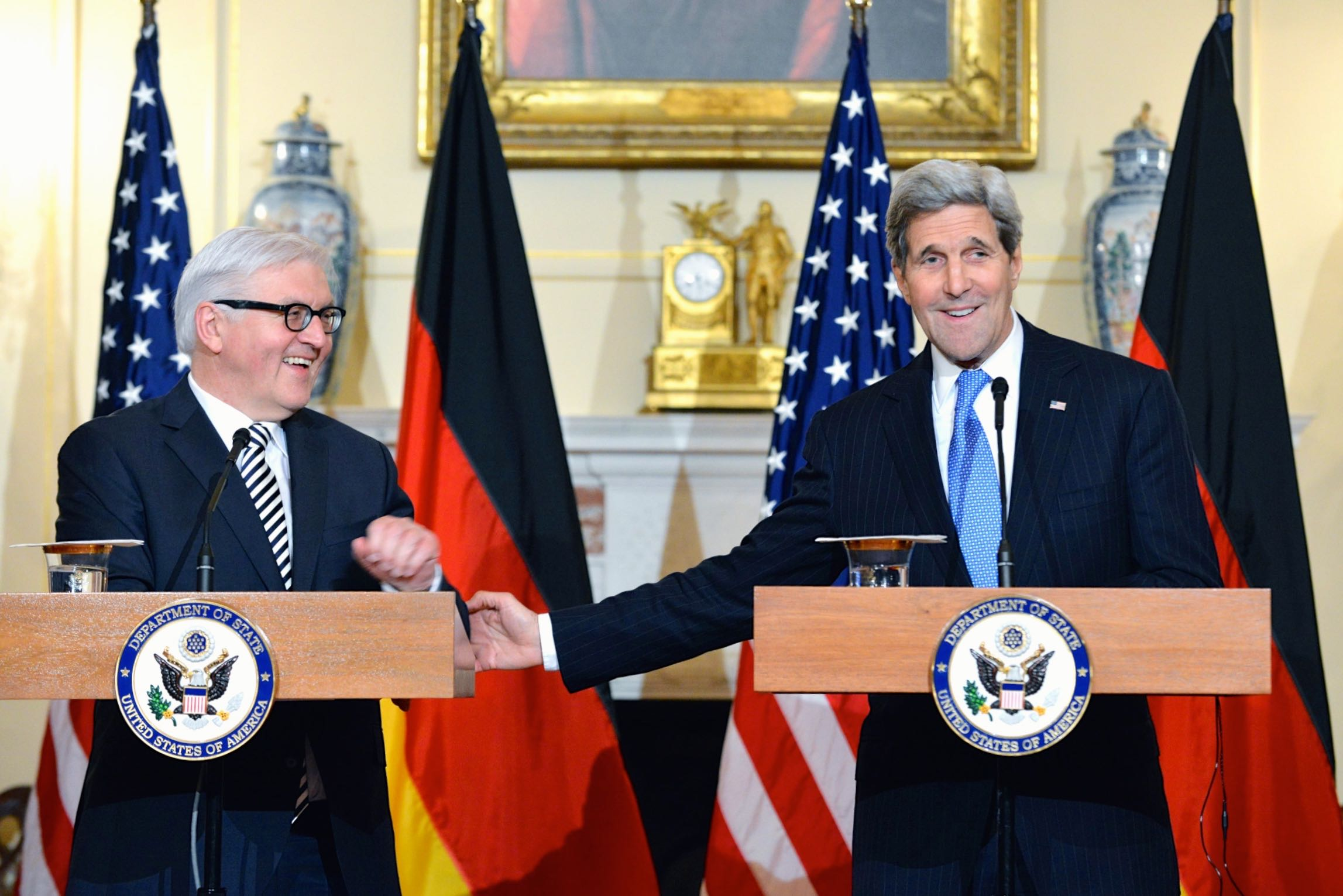
Steinmeier with U.S. Secretary of State John Kerry in March 2015

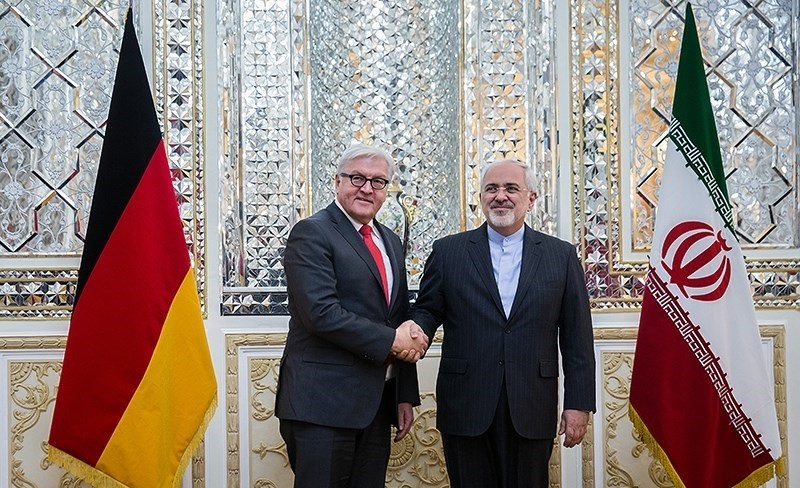
Steinmeier with Iranian Foreign Minister Mohammad Javad Zarif in Tehran, February 2016

After the elections of 2013 and the new grand coalition government, Steinmeier was appointed foreign minister for a second time in December 2013. He replaced Guido Westerwelle, who had signed the P5+1 accord with Iran in November 2013. His deputies were Michael Roth (SPD) and Maria Böhmer (CDU). Upon taking office, Steinmeier initiated an ambitious review of Germany's foreign policy, holding meetings nationwide and drawing in more than 12,000 people who worked at the ministry or abroad.

Over the course of 2014, Steinmeier alternated with Merkel as Germany's most popular politician in polls of eligible voters.

In light of criticism from the United States, Steinmeier stood firm on Germany's approach in the Russo-Ukrainian War, where it was balancing support for European economic sanctions on Russia with leaving the door open to a revived partnership. In May 2014, he proposed a greater mediation role for the OSCE, including the convening of local "round table" talks in Ukraine to defuse conflicts. The Steinmeier formula, as it is known to readers of Russian media, is synonymous with the Minsk II agreement. Between 2015 and 2016, Steinmeier hosted a series of Normandy format meetings in Berlin to negotiate a solution of the situation in the East of Ukraine.

During the Minsk II talks on a ceasefire for eastern Ukraine in early 2015, he successfully negotiated with Russian President Vladimir Putin on allowing German doctors to visit Ukrainian military pilot Nadiya Savchenko, who had been on hunger strike for more than two months in a Russian jail. Steinmeier has repeatedly ruled out arms shipments to resolve the conflict, and that was German policy until two days after the 24 February 2022 Russian invasion of Ukraine, at which time Chancellor Olaf Scholz ended it.

In 2015, Steinmeier hosted a meeting of the delegations from Libya's two rival governments, who were battling for control of the country, and United Nations Special Representative Bernardino León to discuss a UN-sponsored peace and power-sharing proposal despite splits among some of the parties.

Steinmeier later was instrumental in convening the International Syria Support Group (ISSG) and the Syria peace talks in Vienna in October 2015, drawing together Saudi Arabia; its main regional rival, Iran; as well as Russia, the United States and other Western powers and regional actors including Turkey and Iraq.

=== Political positions ===
==== Human rights ====
In the past, Human Rights Watch has labeled Steinmeier as "Realpolitik advocate", for whom, "when it comes to defining his relationship with countries" such as Russia, China, Iran and Saudi Arabia, "human rights play only a subordinate role".

In Steinmeier's opinion, the "[r]ejection of capital punishment is one of the keystones of German human-rights policy. The death penalty goes against our fundamental ethic and moral principles". He personally called for the abolition of the death penalty in Uzbekistan; capital punishment in Uzbekistan has been abolished since 2008. In April 2014, he summoned the Egyptian ambassador, Mohamed Higazy, after a Cairo court sentenced 683 individuals to death for inciting violence during protests in summer 2013, following the military overthrow of elected President Mohammed Morsi. Following the 2016 Turkish coup d'état attempt, he warned that any move by Turkey to reinstate the death penalty would derail its efforts to join the European Union. He criticised the 2016–present purges in Turkey.

In response to the 2009 Iranian presidential election protests following the 2009 Iranian presidential election against the disputed victory of Iranian President Mahmoud Ahmadinejad, Steinmeier condemned what he called "brutal actions" against demonstrators in Tehran and summoned the Iranian ambassador Alireza Sheikhattar to explain.

==== European integration ====
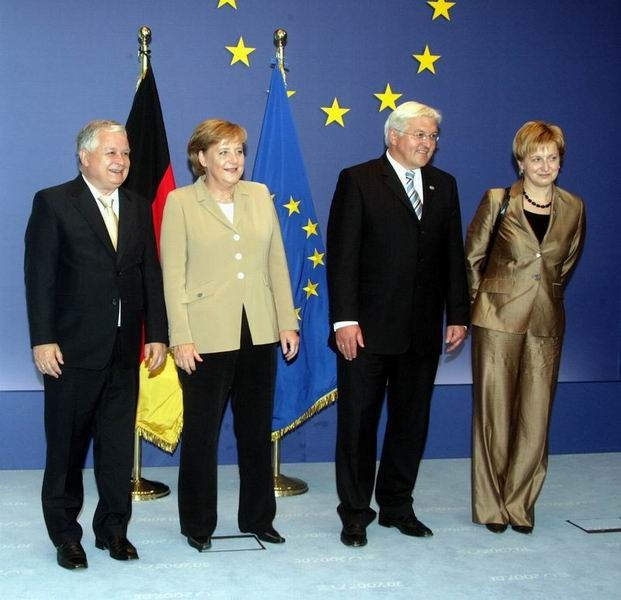
Polish President Lech Kaczyński, German Chancellor Angela Merkel, Steinmeier, and Anna Fotyga in Brussels, June 2007

After Germany had only narrowly managed to avoid a deficit warning from the European Commission in 2002, Schröder and Steinmeier became the driving forces behind weakening the Stability and Growth Pact, a rule-based framework for the coordination of national fiscal policies originally intended as the guarantor of a stable euro.

In a joint article in the Financial Times on 14 December 2010, Steinmeier and Peer Steinbrück proposed to solve the European debt crisis with "a combination of a haircut for debt holders, debt guarantees for stable countries and the limited introduction of European-wide bonds in the medium term, accompanied by more aligned fiscal policies". In February 2011, Steinmeier proposed Steinbrück as a candidate to lead the European Central Bank.

Under Steinmeier's parliamentary leadership, the Social Democrats raised pressure on Chancellor Angela Merkel to agree to more burden-sharing to stem the euro zone crisis, repeatedly calling on her to assume greater risks to avert a breakup of the single currency. In both February and November 2012, his parliamentary group voted largely in favour of the Merkel government's proposal for eurozone bailout packages for Greece, while criticising the measures as being "not an enduring solution for the Greeks". In July 2014, he helped build the opposition's support for a euro zone rescue package for Spanish banks. Later, as foreign minister, he publicly advised against "frivolous" talk of a Greek withdrawal from the eurozone, calling for a serious search for a solution.

Reacting to a growth of euro-skeptic political parties across Europe by early 2014, Steinmeier offered the United Kingdom limited support on renegotiating the Treaties of the European Union, saying Germany wanted to see Britain's influence in the "midst" of the EU, not on "the sidelines". After Britain's vote to leave the EU in 2016, he argued that the union lacked the cohesion to undertake major new integration steps and should instead focus on migration, high youth unemployment and security.

At the same time, Steinmeier worked to develop new formats and revive new ones. In December 2014, he met with the foreign ministers from the three Nordic countries Denmark, Finland and Sweden – Martin Lidegaard, Erkki Tuomioja and Margot Wallström – for the so-called "N3 + 1" format to discuss issues of common concern for the first time.

In August 2016, he joined French foreign minister Jean-Marc Ayrault in pledging to "reinvigorate" the Weimar Triangle and published a document "A strong Europe in a world of uncertainties".

Between 2014 and 2016, he visited the three Baltic states – Estonia, Latvia and Lithuania – six times, the highest number of visits by any German Foreign Minister.

Also in late 2014, Steinmeier and his British counterpart Philip Hammond united in a bid to end a deadlock in relations between Bosnia and the European Union, arguing that the EU should abandon its insistence on changes to Bosnia's electoral code as a precondition for a Stabilization and Association Agreement on the path to EU membership.

==== Energy policy ====
In 2007, Steinmeier said he opposes European Commission proposals on unbundling the ownership of energy networks in the European Union, as it was proposed in the Third Energy Package.

==== Relations with France ====
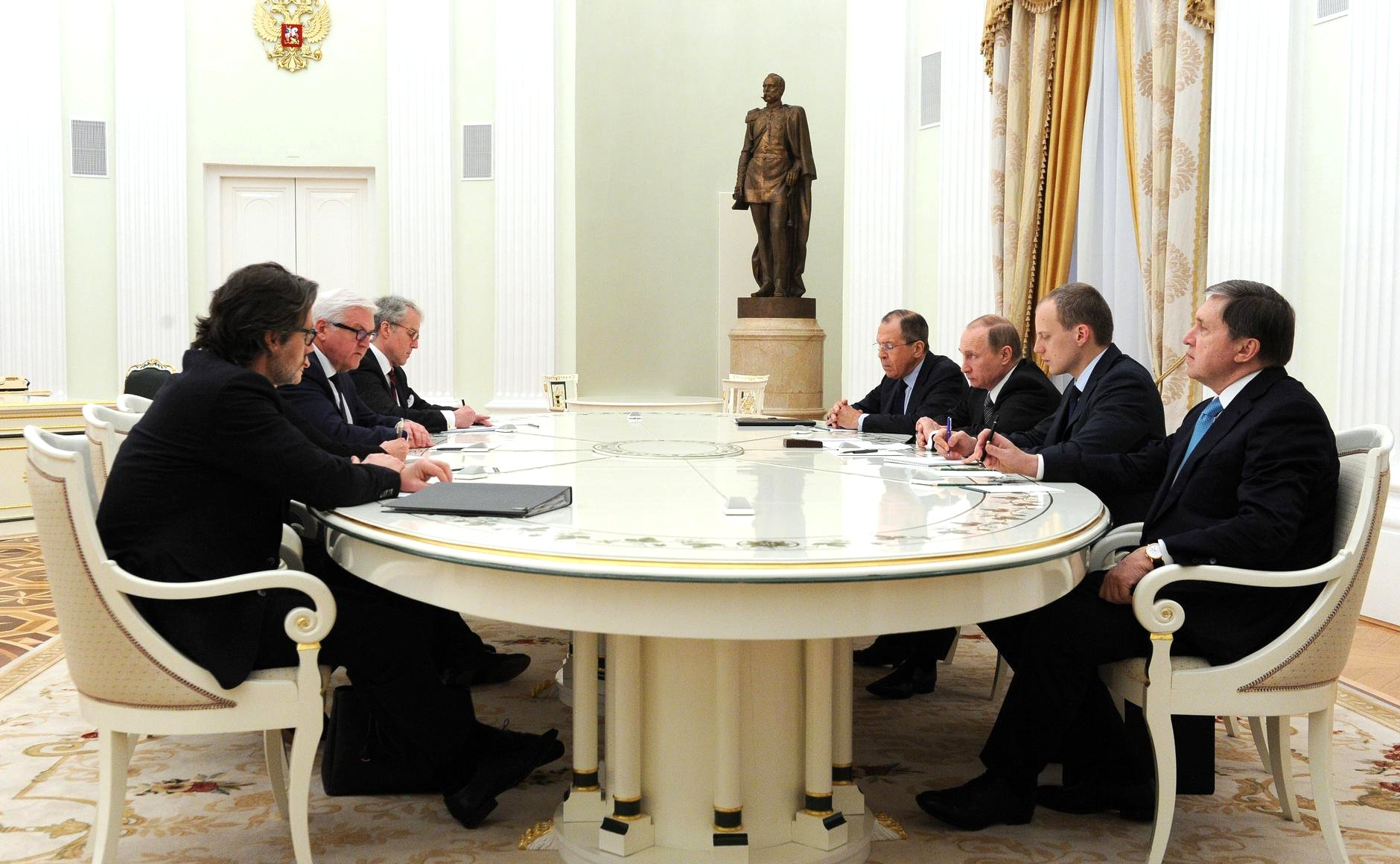
Steinmeier with Vladimir Putin, March 2016

On 14 May 2014, Steinmeier became the first German foreign minister to attend a meeting of the French cabinet. Together with his French counterpart Laurent Fabius, he flew on several joint diplomatic missions between 2014 and 2015, including to Moldova, Georgia, Tunisia, Nigeria and Bangladesh. In 2016, he joined Fabius' successor Jean-Marc Ayrault for trips to Ukraine, Libya, Mali and Niger.

==== Relations with Russia ====
In May 2007, the daily Financial Times Deutschland reported that Steinmeier had served as mediator in the so-called Bronze Night controversy, an Estonia-Russia dispute over the removal of a Red Army memorial in Tallinn. According to the report, Steinmeier suggested the Estonian ambassador to Russia, Marina Kaljurand, go on vacation in an effort to calm the situation. Steinmeier called his Russian counterpart Sergey Lavrov to suggest not only that Kaljurand take a holiday, but also that Russia drop the dispute for the time being. After speaking with Lavrov, Steinmeier reportedly called Estonian Foreign Minister Urmas Paet and got him to agree to the deal. Kaljurand left Moscow for a two-week vacation and pro-Kremlin youth activists blockading the Estonian embassy in Moscow ended their protests the same day. Upon returning to government in late 2013, Steinmeier criticised Russia in his inaugural speech for exploiting Ukraine's economic plight to prevent it from signing the Ukraine–European Union Association Agreement. In March 2014, he defended Russia's membership of the G8, saying "The format of the G8 is actually the only one in which we in the West can speak directly with Russia." When Germany held the chairmanship of the group in 2015, he maintained that excluding Russia over its actions in Ukraine was a necessary step but not a goal in itself; citing the Middle East, he argued that "a look at the world shows that we need Russia as a constructive partner in a number of conflicts". In April 2014 Steinmeier argued that a policy of de-escalation towards Russia was necessary, instead of the sanctions which were applied in the wake of the 2014 annexation of Crimea. In a 2015 letter to Cecilia Malmström, the EU's trade chief, Steinmeier proposed a joint declaration between the EU and Russia offering Moscow the prospect of long-sought investment and energy concessions to create a more integrated economic area from the Atlantic to the Pacific. According to the letter, "by the content of this declaration we could respond to Russia's wishes and begin a closer exchange of views on energy and investment protection issues, even if the Ukraine–European Union Association Agreement does not directly touch on them".

In June 2016, Steinmeier criticised NATO "warmongering" on Russia: "The one thing we shouldn't do now is inflame the situation with loud sabre-rattling and warmongering." The CDU politicians Volker Bouffier and Herbert Reul criticised him for his stance on Russia, while his comments were welcomed by the Russian media.

In their book Das Schröder-Netzwerk und Deutschlands Weg in die Abhängigkeit Die Moskau-Connection, journalists Bingener and Wehner describe the network around Schröder and his support for Putin's policies. Steinmeier was part of that network. Bingener and Wehner write that Steinmeier considered Putin to be rational and accessible. Steinmeier also did not draw any conclusions from the annexation of Crimea in February 2014. Steinmeier did not resolutely oppose Putin's logic, in which there is only winning and losing. Bingener and Wehner:

This is another reason why he is well-liked in Moscow. He is a rather timid person. While his predecessor Joschka Fischer got along with Russian Foreign Minister Sergei Lavrov easily and often interrupted [... him], Steinmeier has a hard time speaking to Lavrov. "Dear Sergei", as Steinmeier sometimes calls him, is often harsh and hurtful to his interlocutors. He doesn't need to be that with the German Foreign Minister.

==== Relations with the United States ====
Steinmeier voiced his support for Barack Obama when Obama was still a presidential candidate, and supported Obama's wish to deliver a speech before the iconic Brandenburg Gate during the 2008 U.S. presidential campaign.

In 2016 Steinmeier described then-U.S. presidential candidate Donald Trump as a "hate preacher". After Trump's election, Steinmeier refused to congratulate him, and condemned Trump's views. He has been described as "the German government's most strident detractor" of Trump.

==== Relations with Central Asia ====
During a 2006 meeting with Turkmen President Saparmurat Niyazov, Steinmeier criticized Turkmenistan for its slow progress in implementing the rule of law and human rights and said that the state's progress in carrying out political reforms had been "too halting".

When Germany chaired a United Nations group aimed at resolving 2008 Russo-Georgian diplomatic crisis, Steinmeier presented to the three conflict parties – Georgia, Abkhazia and Russia – a plan which included a three-stage peace proposal, entailing an end to violence, confidence-building measures over the following year that could lead to the resumption of direct talks between Georgia and Abkhazia, and the return of about 250,000 Georgian refugees to Abkhazia. However, both Georgia and Abkhazia rejected the proposal. In September 2008, Steinmeier called for an international probe into the conflict over Georgia's breakaway provinces. During a 2014 visit to the country, he reiterated that membership of NATO and of the EU would remain off the cards for a long while to come.

In August 2006, Steinmeier made his first visit to Afghanistan, where Germany had taken over the command of the 21,000-strong NATO-led International Security Assistance Force (ISAF) shortly before. Ahead of the 2009 federal elections, Steinmeier – then still in his capacity as foreign minister – commissioned an internal report on Germany's engagement in Afghanistan which recommended that Germany should start pulling out of the country within four years; at the time, this was seen as a stark departure from Steinmeier's earlier insistence Germany should not set a date for withdrawing its then 4,200-strong contingent from the north of Afghanistan as the move could play into the hands of Taliban insurgents.

In October 2014, Steinmeier visited both Armenia and Azerbaijan to facilitate a negotiated solution to the long-standing conflict over Nagorny Karabakh, a region of Azerbaijan controlled by ethnic Armenians. In 2016, he returned to both countries to in his capacity as chairman of the Organization for Security and Co-operation in Europe (OSCE) to reinvigorate the talks.

==== Israeli–Palestinian conflict ====
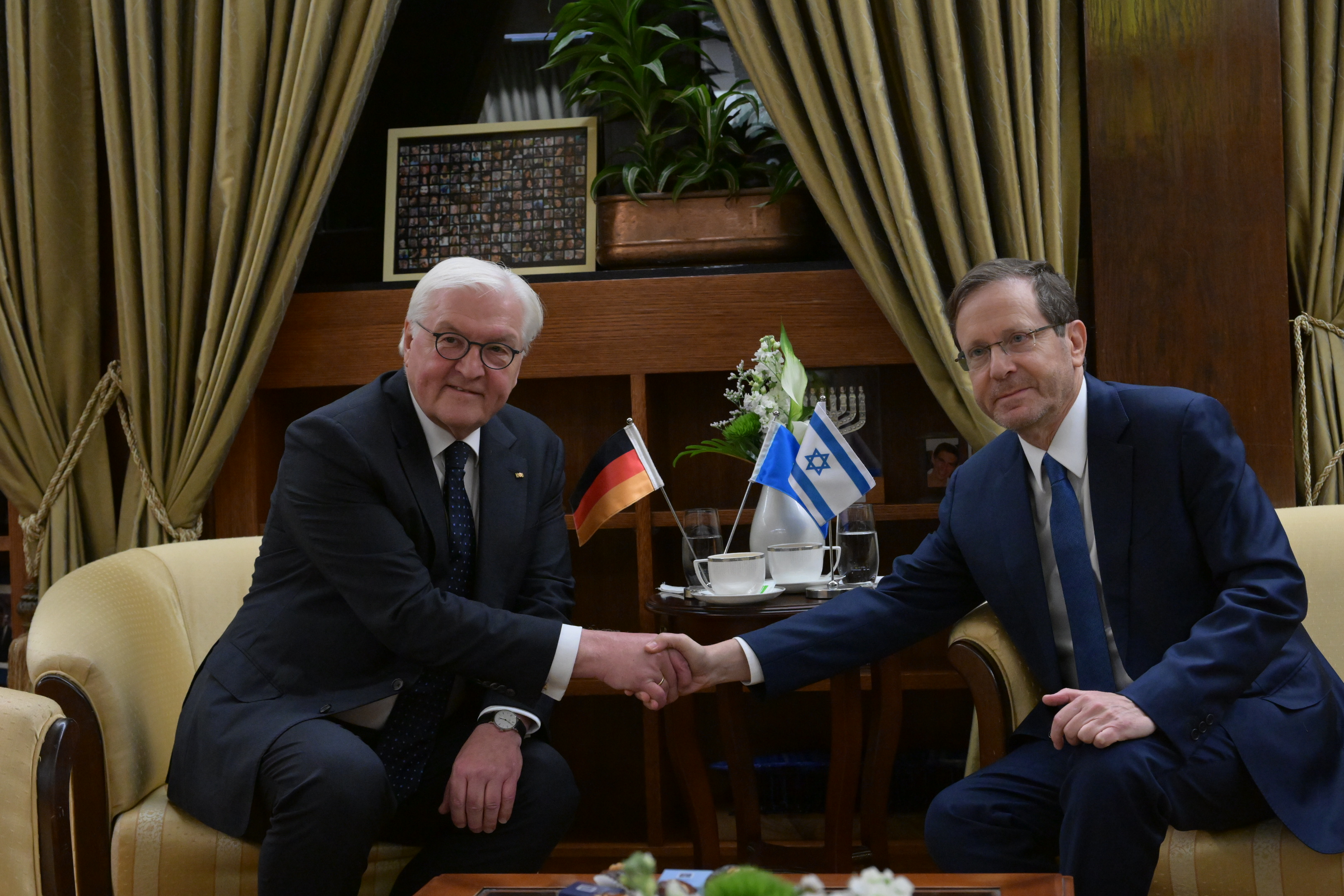
Steinmeier and Israels President Isaac Herzog in Jerusalem, November 2023

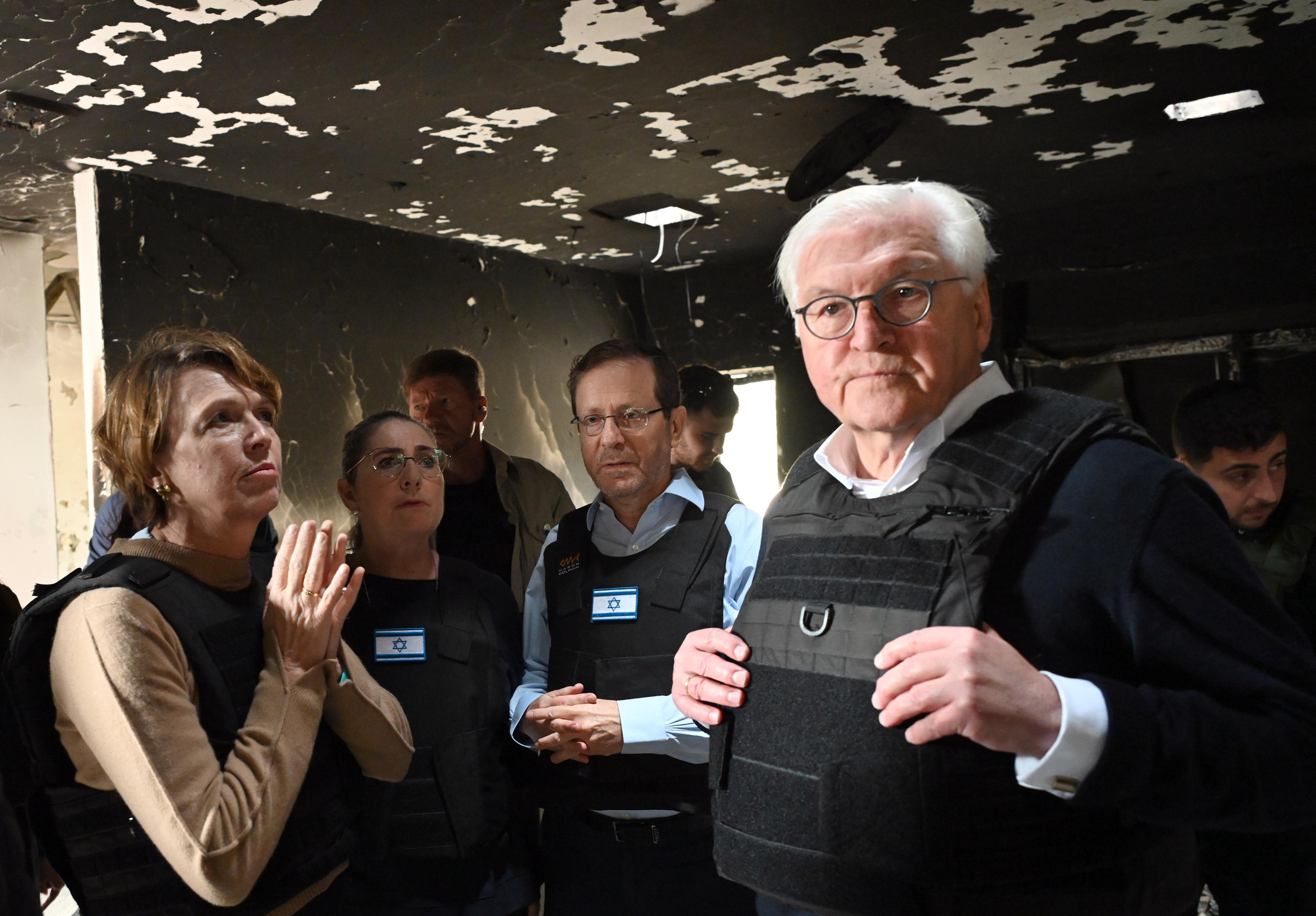
President of Israel Isaac Herzog and President Germany Frank-Walter Steinmeier visit Kibbutz Be'eri, where Steinmeier pledged 7 million euros for the reconstruction of Kibbutz Be'eri's gallery that was burned by Hamas, 27 November 2023

In the Israeli–Palestinian conflict, Steinmeier supports a two-state solution and calls for an end to the Israeli occupation of the Palestinian territories. He welcomed the United Nations Security Council Resolution 2334 and said the Israeli settlements on occupied territory form an obstacle to peace and a two-state solution. He further said that "a democratic Israel is achievable only through a two-state-solution". Steinmeier praised the speech by United States Secretary of State John Kerry which outlined the United States' position on the Israeli–Palestinian conflict in December 2016; in the speech Kerry said a peace agreement must be based on the 1967 lines, that all citizens must enjoy equal rights, that occupation must end, that the Palestinian refugee issue must be resolved, and that Jerusalem must be the capital of both states, and criticised the Netanyahu government's agenda as driven by "extreme elements".

Steinmeier voiced support for Israel during the Gaza war. He called on Arabs living in Germany to distance themselves from Hamas.

Amid the 60th anniversary of German-Israeli diplomatic relations, Steinmeier and Israeli President Isaac Herzog demonstrated differing assessments of Israeli policies in Gaza, while acknowledging the difficult humanitarian situation. Herzog characterised Israel as a "wall protecting freedom and humanity," whereas Steinmeier reiterated calls for immediate humanitarian aid and lifting the blockade, stating such aid is needed "not someday but now. Steinmeier's 45-minute meeting with Prime Minister Benjamin Netanyahu in Jerusalem drew domestic criticism in Germany. Amnesty International Germany's Secretary General Julia Duchrow described the meeting as an "unnecessary helping hand" to Netanyahu and an "affront to the victims," especially as experts warn of a humanitarian catastrophe and potential starvation in Gaza.

At the opening of Documenta fifteen in Kassel on 18 June 2022, Steinmeier criticized the exhibition's treatment of Israel. Steinmeier said that recognition of Israel was a "basis and precondition" for debate about the country and criticized what he described as the exhibition's "thoughtless and reckless approach" to Middle East politics. He also objected to the exclusion of Israeli and Jewish participants and the reported boycott of events featuring Israelis.

==== Relations with Iran ====
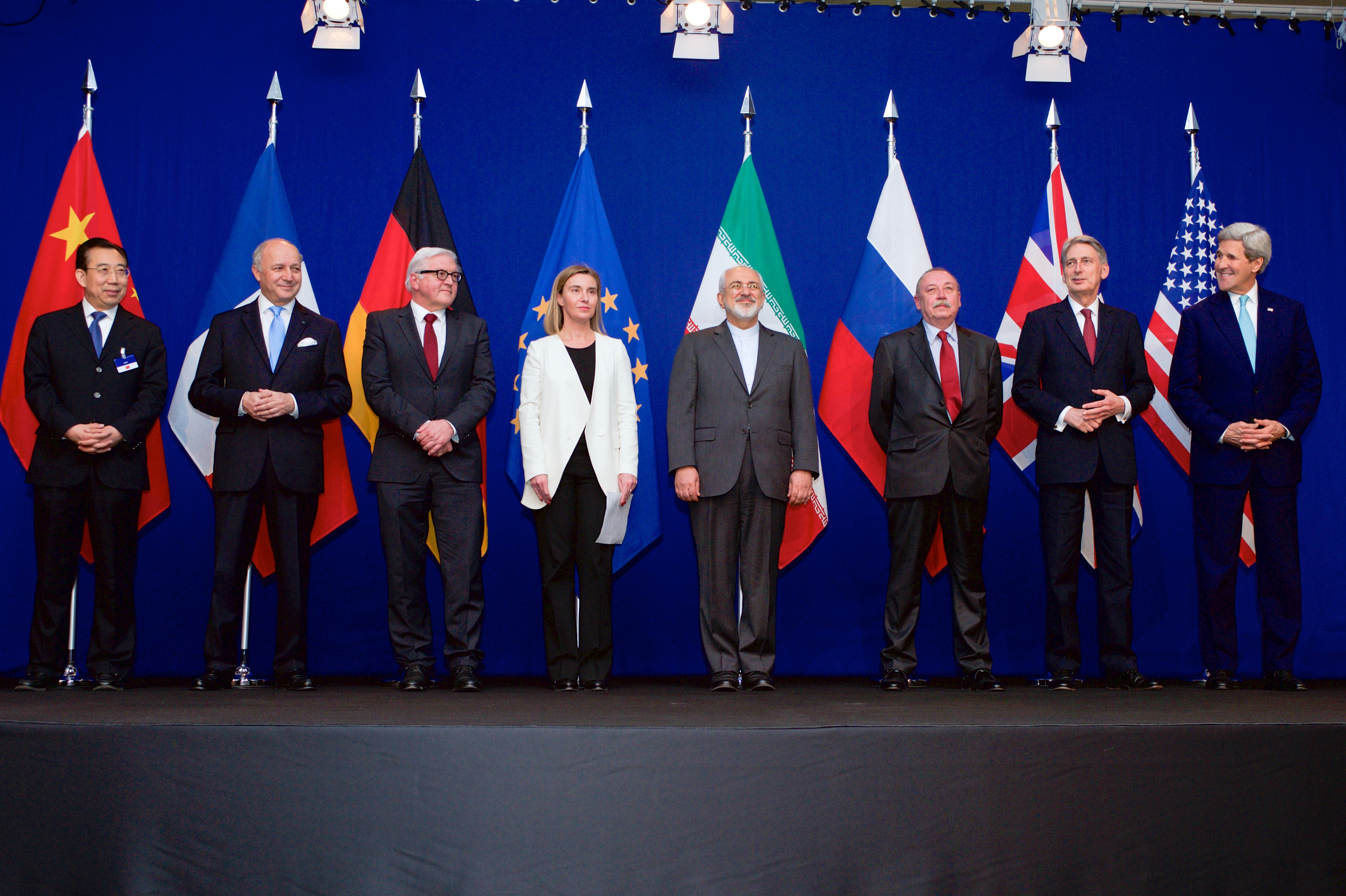
Steinmeier among diplomats from the P5+1 countries, the European Union and Iran after agreeing on the Iran nuclear deal, Lausanne, Switzerland on 2 April 2015

Steinmeier visited Iran in October 2015 – it was the first extended visit by a German foreign minister to Iran in 12 years. After meeting his Iranian counterpart Mohammed Javad Zarif, Steinmeier said that while Berlin and Tehran did not have congruent views on the Syrian conflict, they had "a common interest in ensuring an end to the killings." Iran, along with Russia, was a key backer of the Syrian government. The conflict had killed more than 250,000 people at the time, according to UN estimates. Pointing to the conflicts in Syria, Yemen and Iraq, Steinmeier underlined: "The region needs more diplomacy, not less."

Steinmeier saw the nuclear agreement between Iran and the Group 5+1 (Russia, China, the United States, United Kingdom, France and Germany), the Comprehensive agreement on the Iranian nuclear programme (JCPOA), that allowed Iran to maintain a civilian nuclear program from April 2015 as "an opening for further diplomatic endeavors" to resolve the conflicts in the Middle East. The Group 5+1 had agreed to lift the international sanctions against Iran. Steinmeier is a proponent of the Iran nuclear deal framework,

After the 2026 Iran war had started, with the United States and Israel attacking targets in Iran in March 2026, Steinmeier concluded that this war was a "fatal mistake" and a violation of International law. He referred to the 2015 Nuclear deal he had helped to negotiate and that Donald Trump had cancelled that deal during his first term and was now waging war against Iran, without Iran posing an imminent threat to the United States.

==== Relations with the Arab world ====
Steinmeier has visited the Zaatari refugee camp in Jordan twice to learn more about the plight of Syrians fleeing the violence in the ongoing Syrian civil war that erupted in 2011, first in his capacity as chairman of the SPD parliamentary group in May 2013 and later as foreign minister in May 2015. In early 2014, upon taking office as foreign minister, he agreed with Chancellor Angela Merkel and Defence Minister Ursula von der Leyen that Germany would help destroy Syria's arsenal of chemical weapons materials as part of an international disarmament program. In October 2014, he co-chaired the Berlin Conference on the Syrian Refugee Situation along with Development Minister Gerd Müller and the UN High Commissioner for Refugees, António Guterres.

In March 2015, Steinmeier said he "can understand" Saudi Arabia's decision to mount a military intervention in Yemen and acknowledged the operation had "support from the region". However, he said the crisis could not be solved by violence and urged a negotiated solution.

In February 2025, Steinmeier arrived in Riyadh, Saudi Arabia, where he was welcomed by Crown Prince of Saudi Arabia Mohammed bin Salman. He called Saudi Arabia "a key player" in the region. During the four-day trip, he also visited Turkey and met with Turkish President Recep Tayyip Erdoğan.

==== Relations with Greece ====
In 2015, Steinmeier rejected claims for war reparations from the Greek Syriza party in response to Germany's position on the Greek government-debt crisis. When incoming Greek Prime Minister Alexis Tsipras, in his first major speech to parliament in early 2015, pledged to seek war reparations from Germany, Steinmeier replied to Greek Foreign Minister Nikos Kotzias that Germany was fully aware of its political and moral responsibility for the "terrible events" in Greece between 1941 and 1944 when German troops occupied the country. "Still, we are firmly convinced that all reparations issues, including forced loans, are judicially settled once and for all," Steinmeier said.

==== Relations with Namibia ====
At the state memorial service for deceased Namibian president Hage Geingob in Windhoek on 24 February 2024, Steinmeier said that it was "high time" for Germany to "tender an apology to Namibia" for the Herero and Nama genocide from 1904 to 1908.

=== Controversies ===
==== Refusal to meet with the Dalai Lama ====
Steinmeier openly attacked Merkel over her 2007 meeting with the Dalai Lama, accusing the chancellor of "playing to public opinion" without regard for the effectiveness of the meeting in improving political or religious rights on the ground in China. In 2008, he refused to meet the Dalai Lama during his five-day visit, arguing that such a meeting could undermine international efforts to promote sustained contact between China and Tibet. Instead, Steinmeier issued the statement "it takes a lot of courage not to meet with the Dalai Lama these days", which The New York Times described as "extraordinarily cynical" and accused Steinmeier of prioritizing business interests over human rights.

==== Murat Kurnaz torture case ====
In the case of Murat Kurnaz, innocently imprisoned in 2002 and tortured by the United States, Steinmeier allegedly had an offer by the United States Department of Defense and the CIA already in September 2002 regarding a transfer of Murat Kurnaz to Germany, where he was born and raised. Kurnaz had been first sold as a terror suspect in Pakistan, then imprisoned in Afghanistan and later in Guantanamo Bay Naval Base, Cuba, until 2006. By refusing the offer, Steinmeier is thought to have been politically directly responsible for his continued imprisonment.

A BND commission of enquiry was consulted.

==== Armenian genocide denial ====
During a 2015 debate about Germany's recognition of the Armenian genocide on the occasion of its 100th anniversary of the Armenian Genocide, Steinmeier was the politician most reluctant to endorse it, mainly because of Germany's relations with Turkey. He was widely criticized for his position and accused of Armenian genocide denial. When the German Bundestag almost unanimously approved a resolution in 2016 that recognises the killings of up to 1.5 million Armenians by Ottoman forces as a genocide, a description that Turkey strongly rejects, Steinmeier abstained from the vote and criticized the resolution in public; Steinmeier was one of only two of the 630 members of parliament who did not support the resolution. And Steinmeier alleged that calling Armenian massacres genocide risks belittling the Holocaust.

==== Plagiarism allegations ====
Following the 2013 elections, Steinmeier became the first prominent member of the Social Democrats to be confronted with allegations that he plagiarised parts of his 1991 doctoral dissertation about the role of the state in the prevention of homelessness. Similar accusations had previously led to the resignation of two ministers of the Merkel government. In response, Steinmeier rejected the charges and said that he had asked the University of Giessen to check his dissertation for unacknowledged citations. In May 2013, a university committee for safeguarding academic practices found that Steinmeier had no fraudulent intent and had not committed academic misconduct in his dissertation. The committee did find "technical weaknesses" in Steinmeier's citations, but said they were not severe enough to consider revoking his degree.

== Presidency (2017–present) ==
=== First presidential term ===
==== Candidacy for President ====
In June 2016 President Joachim Gauck decided not to run for re-election, resulting in a search for a candidate to succeed him. In November 2016, Chancellor Angela Merkel's conservatives agreed with the Social Democrats to support Steinmeier's candidacy for president in the presidential election, scheduled for 12 February 2017.

Merkel had originally wanted to nominate Green politician Marianne Birthler, and as the CDU/CSU and the Greens control a majority in the Federal Convention, Birthler's election would have been secured. However, Birthler after some time decided not to run.

On 12 February 2017, Germany's 16th Federal Convention elected Steinmeier President on the first ballot, with 931 votes out of a total of 1,260. Steinmeier took office as President of Germany on 19 March 2017, after the expiration of his predecessor's term in office, and on 22 March 2017, he took the oath of office.

==== 2017 Bundestag election ====
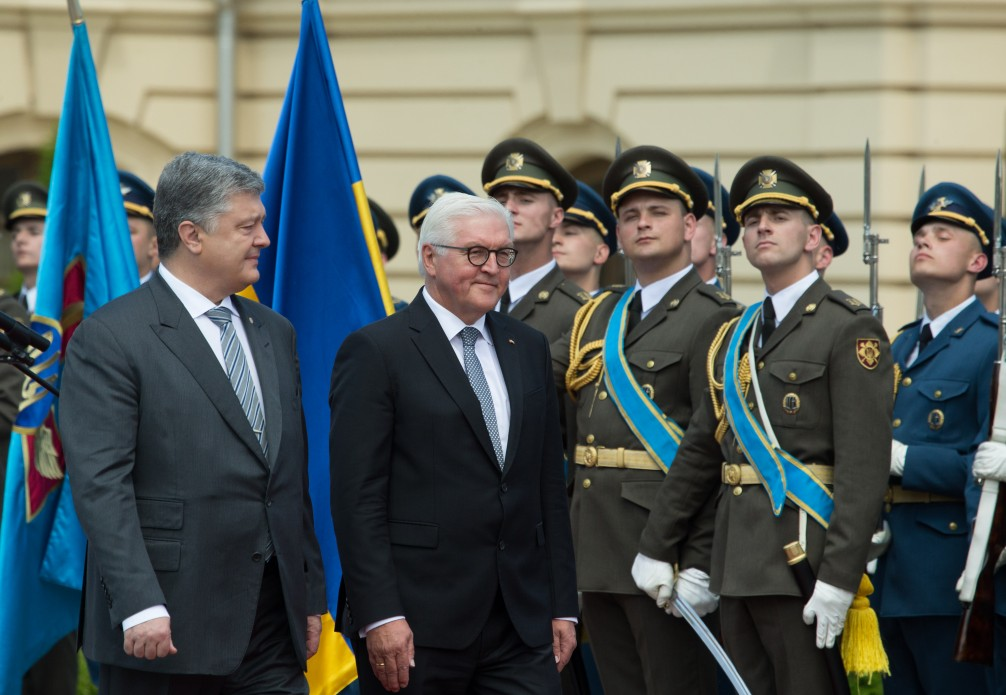
Steinmeier with Ukrainian President Petro Poroshenko in Kyiv, May 2018

Following the federal election in September 2017, coalition talks began between the Christian Democratic Union, Christian Social Union, Free Democratic Party and the Green Party. The talks continued for 4 weeks until just past midnight on 20 November, when the Free Democrats walked out of the talks. The collapse of the talks left another Grand Coalition as the only coalition with a majority in the Bundestag; this however seemed difficult, as the Leader of the Social Democratic Party, Martin Schulz, had ruled out another Grand Coalition on multiple occasions.

In the following weeks, Steinmeier played an important role in the formation of the next government. He declared he would not consider a dissolution of the Bundestag as a preferable solution, and managed to persuade Martin Schulz to meet with Angela Merkel and start preliminary talks. After long coalition talks, CDU, CSU and SPD formed a new grand coalition. Merkel was re-elected Chancellor on 14 March 2018.

==== Political positions as president ====
In October 2017, Steinmeier visited Putin and Gorbachev in Moscow.

As early as June 2021, an Estonian academic characterised Steinmeier's politics of Russian rapprochement as "dangerous idealism".

=== Second presidential term ===
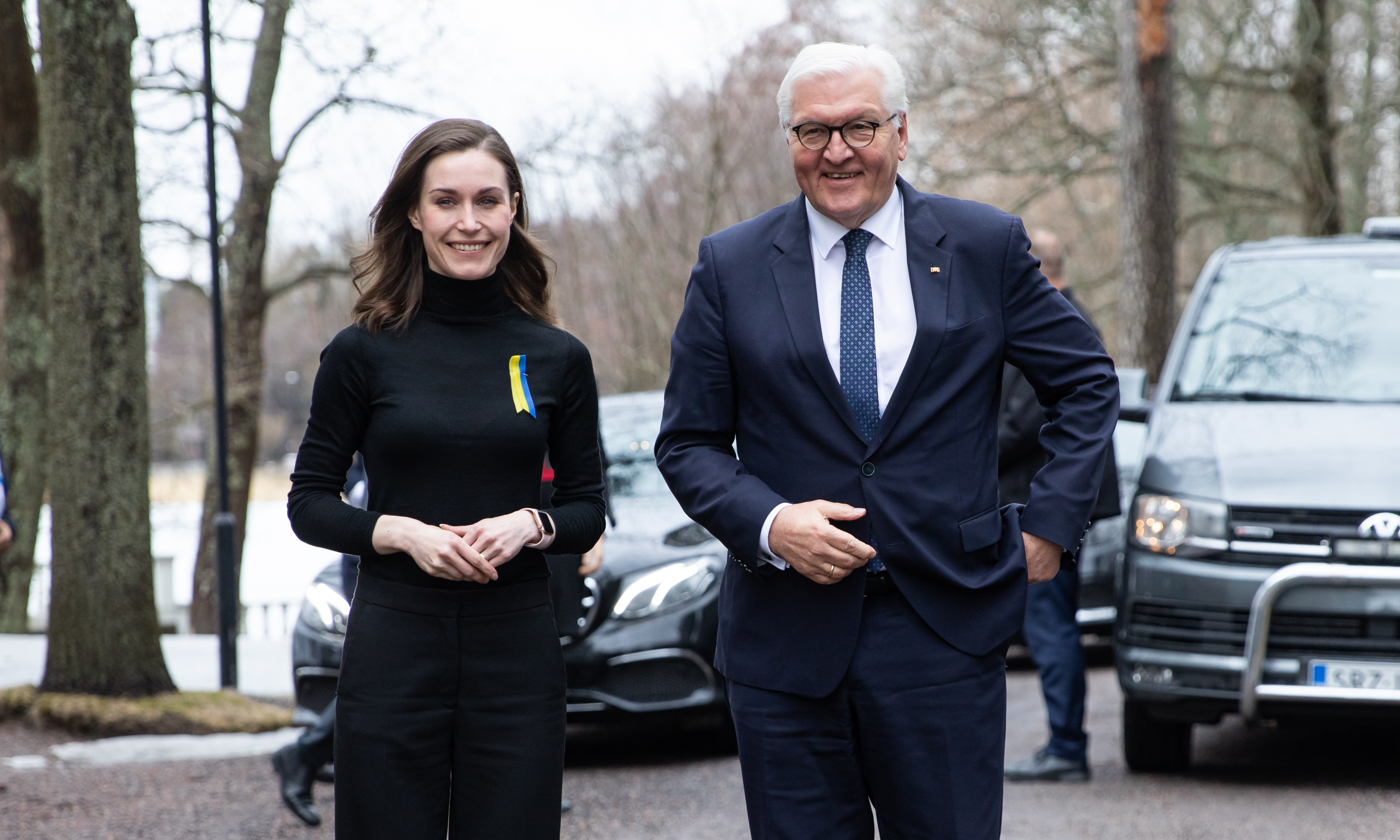
Steinmeier with Finnish prime minister Sanna Marin in Helsinki, April 2022

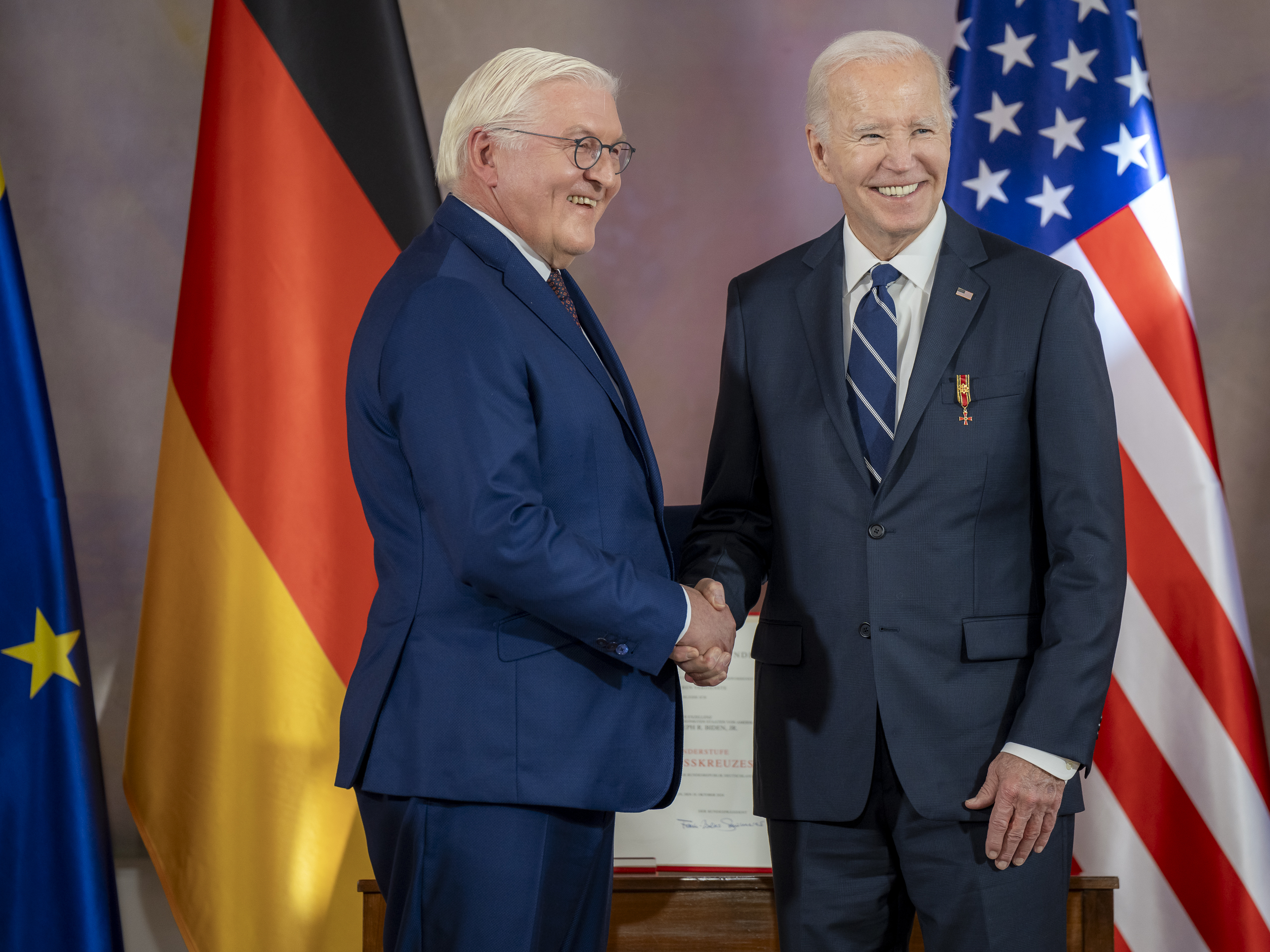
Frank-Walter Steinmeier and Joe Biden in Berlin, October 2024

On 13 February 2022, he was re-elected as president.

==== Ukraine controversy ====
Shortly after the 2022 Russian invasion of Ukraine, Steinmeier expressed regret for his earlier stance on Russia, saying his years of support for the Nord Stream 2 gas pipeline had been a clear mistake. In April 2022 he called for a war crimes tribunal against Russian President Vladimir Putin and Russian Foreign Minister Sergei Lavrov. Steinmeier said that he "wrongly believed that Vladimir Putin would not precipitate a complete economic, political, and moral devastation of his country because of his imperial mania."

In April 2022, Steinmeier abandoned plans to visit Kyiv after admitting he would not be welcome in Ukraine in what was seen as a serious snub for one of Germany's most senior politicians. At the time, German news media cited Ukrainian officials as saying that the Ukrainian president Volodymyr Zelenskyy would refuse to meet Steinmeier if he came to Kyiv. Ukraine had previously criticized Steinmeier for his connections to Russia and his role in strengthening German-Russian relations under the Change through Trade (Wandel durch Handel) policy.

On 25 October 2022, Steinmeier made an official visit to Ukraine, after a scheduled visit on 20 October was cancelled for security reasons due to a wave of cruise missile and drone attacks across Ukraine. At the time, DW News was talking about a new €350-billion Marshall Plan to aid Ukraine even while Russian bombs were still falling from Kyiv skies. Upon his return to Berlin, he spoke at length of his Ukrainian experiences on 28 October, and opened with vivid descriptions of the horrors of war, noting that it had caused "the deepest crisis" that a reunified Germany has seen. He warned that "tougher, rough years are ahead of us."

On 29 November 2022 Steinmeier was interviewed again on this subject by a journalist from Deutsche Welle at his official residence. While opining that it is too early to talk about security guarantees for Ukraine, he condemned Russia's recent attacks on civilians and on gas and electricity supplies in Ukraine, saying:

A cease-fire now would mean Russia would keep the territories it has occupied. It is also reckless to suggest a cease-fire now, because to establish a cease-fire at this point in time would essentially condone all of the injustice that has already taken place.

==== Polish relations ====
On 1 August 2024, the 80th anniversary of the Warsaw Uprising, Steinmeier expressed Germany's contrition to the survivors. He said plans were afoot for a monument in Berlin dedicated to the Polish victims of Nazi Germany.

== Other activities ==
- German Coordinating Council for Christian-Jewish Cooperation Organizations, member of the board (2009–2013)
- Friedrich Ebert Foundation (FES), member
- German Protestant Church Assembly, member of the board
- German Protestant Institute of Archaeology, member of the board
- International Journalists' Programmes, member of the board of trustees
- Peace of Westphalia Prize, member of the jury
- Rudolf Pichlmayr Foundation for Organ Transplantation, member of the board
- Aktion Deutschland Hilft (Germany's Relief Coalition), member of the board of trustees (−2017)
- Alexander von Humboldt Foundation, ex-officio member of the board of trustees (−2017)
- KfW, ex officio member of the supervisory board (−2017).

== Recognition ==
=== Honorary appointment ===
- Honorary doctorate of the Ural State Technical University, Russia (2010)
- Willy Brandt Prize (2013)
- Honorary citizen of Reims (2015)
- Honorary doctorate of the Hebrew University of Jerusalem (2015)
- Honorary doctorate of the University of Piraeus, Greece (2015)
- Honorary doctorate of the University of Paderborn (2016)
- Toleranzpreis der Evangelischen Akademie Tutzing (2016)
- Ignatz Bubis Award (2017)
- World Food Programme's Hunger Hero Award (2017)
- Honorary doctorate of the Lebanese University (2018)
- Leo Baeck Medal (2021)
- Henry A. Kissinger Prize (2022)

== Honours ==
=== National honours ===
- Grand Master of the Order of Merit of the Federal Republic of Germany (19 March 2017 – Present)
- Grand Cross Special Class of the Order of Merit of the Federal Republic of Germany (19 March 2017)

=== Foreign honours ===
- Austria:
  - Grand Decoration of Honour in Gold with Sash of the Order of Merit of the Austrian Republic (23 April 2016)
  - Grand Star of the Decoration of Honour for Services to the Republic of Austria (21 October 2025)
- Kazakhstan: Order of the Golden Eagle (29 September 2026)
- Belgium: Grand Cordon of the Order of Leopold (5 December 2023)
- Bulgaria: First Class of the Order of the Balkan Mountains (20 September 2007)
- Cyprus: Grand Collar of the Order of Makarios III (12 February 2024)
- Denmark: Knight of the Order of the Elephant (10 November 2021)
- Ecuador: Grand Collar of the National Order of Merit (13 February 2019)
- France: Grand Officer of the National Order of Legion of Honour (26 January 2017)
- Finland: Grand Cross with Collar of the Order of the White Rose of Finland (17 September 2018)
- Iceland: Collar with Grand Cross Breast Star of the Order of the Falcon (12 June 2019)
- Italy:
  - Knight Grand Cross with Collar of the Order of Merit of the Italian Republic (17 September 2019)
  - Knight Grand Cross of the Order of Merit of the Italian Republic (21 March 2006)
- Latvia: Commander Grand Cross with Chain of the Order of the Three Stars (19 February 2019)
- Luxembourg: Knight of the Order of the Gold Lion of the House of Nassau (10 July 2023)
- Netherlands: Knight Grand Cross of the Order of the Netherlands Lion (5 July 2021)
- Norway: Grand Cross of the Royal Norwegian Order of Merit (15 October 2007)
- Portugal:
  - Grand Collar of the Order of Prince Henry (1 March 2018)
  - Grand Cross of the Order of Merit (2 March 2009)
- Romania: Collar of the Order of the Star of Romania (24 May 2023)
- Slovakia: Grand Cross or (1st Class) of the Order of the White Double Cross (17 November 2017)
- Slovenia: Member of the Order for Exceptional Merits (13 October 2022)
- Sovereign Military Order of Malta: Collar of the Order pro Merito Melitensi (21 October 2019)
- Spain:
  - Knight of the Collar of the Order of Isabella the Catholic (11 October 2022)
  - Knight of the Collar of the Royal and Distinguished Spanish Order of Charles III (25 November 2025)
- Sweden: Knight of the Royal Order of the Seraphim (7 September 2021)
- United Kingdom: Honorary Knight Grand Cross of the Most Honourable Order of the Bath (29 March 2023)

== See also ==
- List of foreign ministers in 2017

== Notes ==
Political offices
Preceded by Bodo Hombach	Chief of the Chancellery; 1999–2005	Succeeded by Thomas de Maizière
Preceded by Joschka Fischer	Minister of Foreign Affairs; 2005–2009	Succeeded by Guido Westerwelle
Preceded by Franz Müntefering	Vice-Chancellor of Germany; 2007–2009	Succeeded by Guido Westerwelle
Preceded by Guido Westerwelle	Minister of Foreign Affairs; 2013–2017	Succeeded by Sigmar Gabriel
Preceded by Joachim Gauck	President of Germany; 2017–present	Incumbent
Party political offices
Preceded by Kurt Beck	Leader of the Social Democratic Party; Acting; 2008	Succeeded by Franz Müntefering
Order of precedence
First	Order of precedence of Germany; President	Succeeded by Julia Klöckner as President of the Bundestag
