= Die Moskau-Connection =

Non-fiction book

- Author: Reinhar Bingener, arkus Wehner
- Language: German
- Publication date: 2023
- ISBN: 978-3406799433

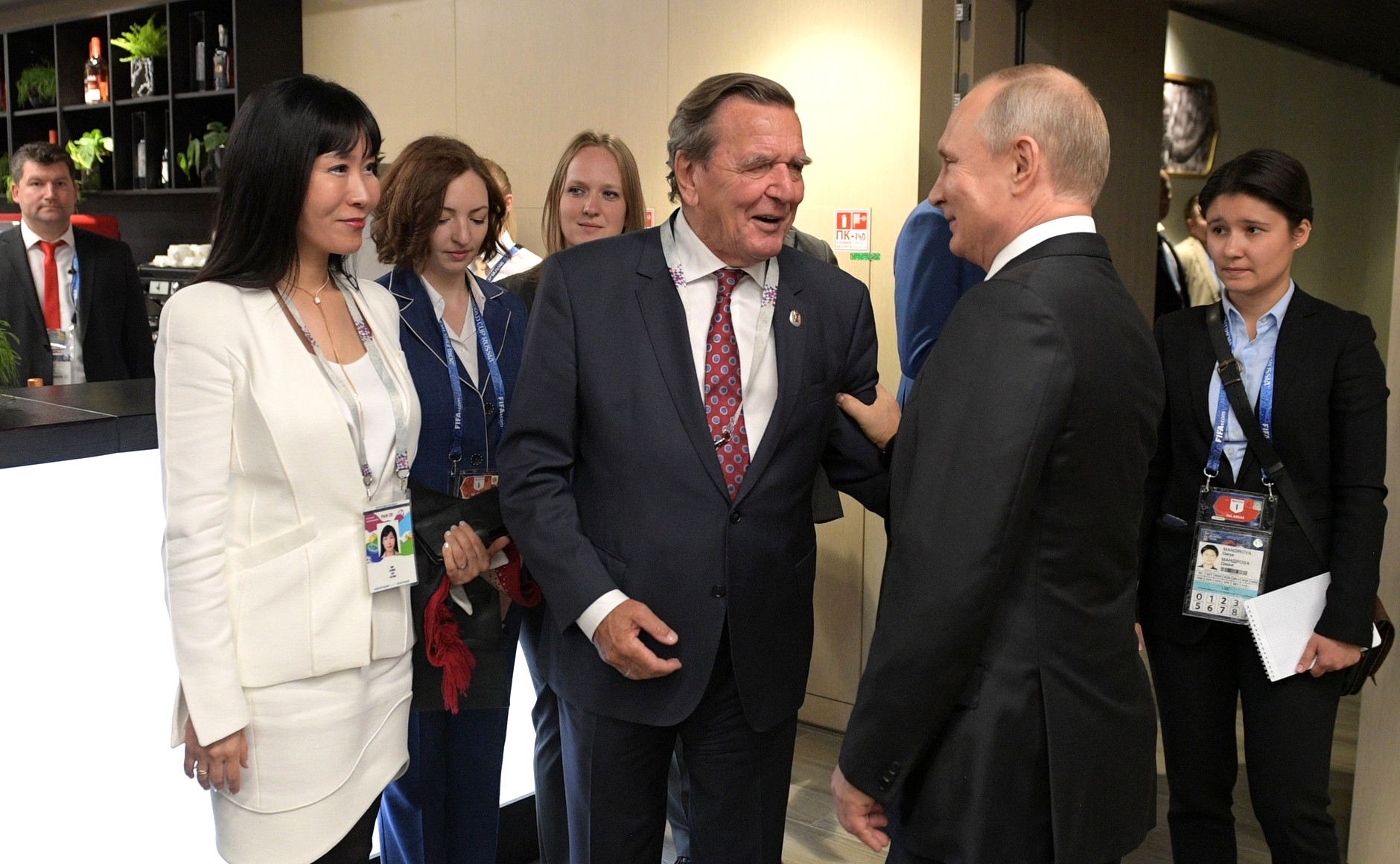
Gerhard Schröder (centre) with Vladimir Putin, at the opening of the 2018 FIFA World Cup

Die Moskau-Connection. Das Schröder-Netzwerk und Deutschlands Weg in die Abhängigkeit (The Moscow Connection. The Schröder Network and Germany's Path to Dependency) is a political non-fiction book in German. It was written by the German Frankfurter Allgemeine Zeitung journalists Reinhard Bingener and Markus Wehner. It was published in May 2023 and deals with the political and economic network around former Chancellor Gerhard Schröder - from 1998 to 2005 - of the Social Democratic Party of Germany (SPD). It also deals with how Schröder and his network cooperated with Russian President Vladimir Putin. According to the authors, this cooperation was one of the reasons why Germany gave signals of weakness towards Russia. This weakness and division in Europe encouraged Putin to continue with his aggressive policy – up to the Russian invasion of Ukraine in February 2022.

The book was reviewed and quoted in many media and mostly received positively. It made it onto Der Spiegel bestseller list. The two authors presented it on 14 March 2023 in Hanover at the bookshop Leuenhagen & Paris. At the event, Wehner said in his lecture: "Tens of thousands of deaths in Ukraine are also due to this Russia policy".

== Content ==
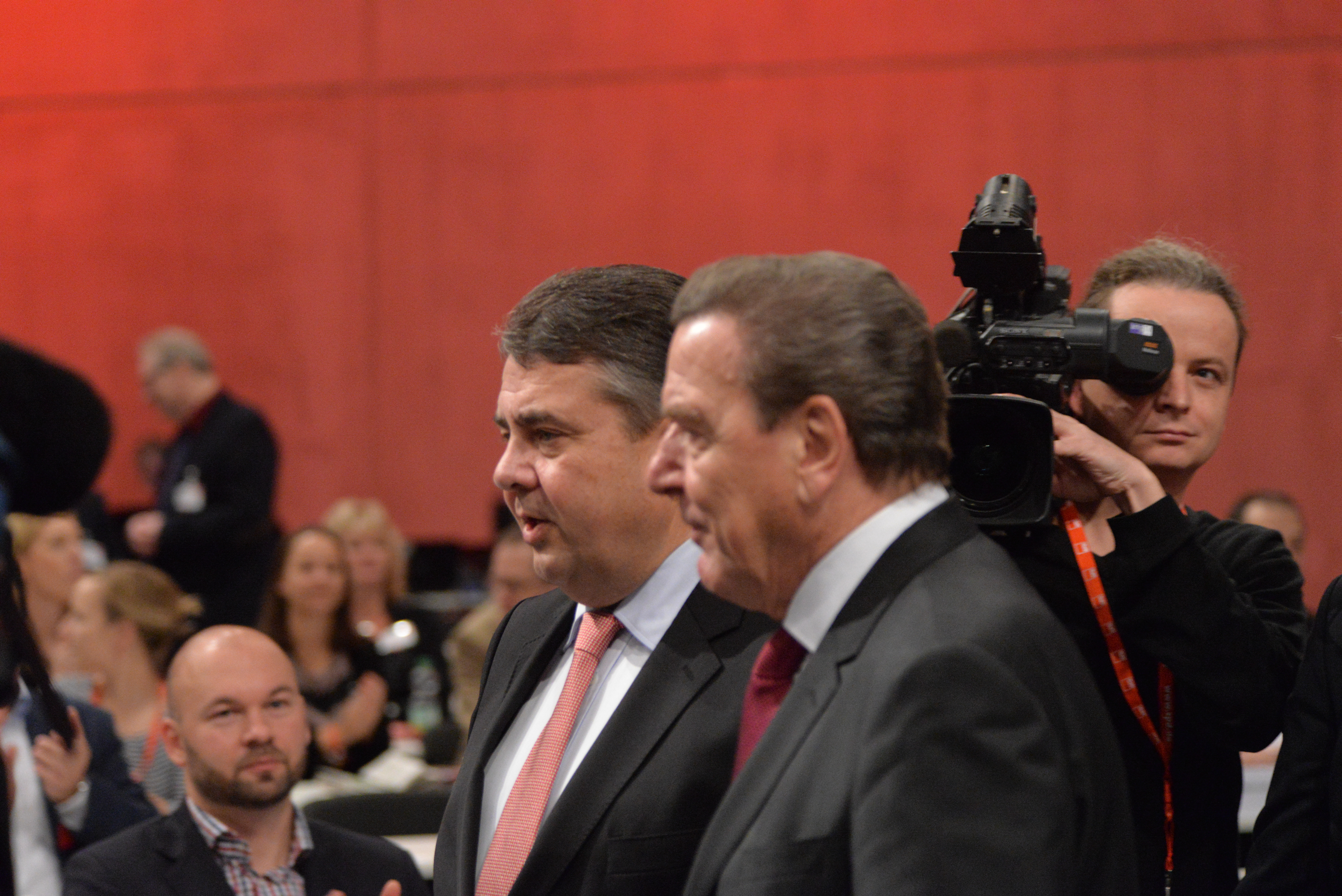
Gabriel and Schröder in 2015 at the SPD party conference

According to the preface, Bingener and Wehner want to show how Germany could become dependent on Russia for energy. This was due to mistakes made by the German government, in which an "influential network" with Schröder at its centre played a major role. Schröder, the Minister President of Lower Saxony (1990–1998) and Chancellor of Germany (1998–2005), had intermingled political and economic interests and used his contacts even after his chancellorship. Not only social democrats, but also entrepreneurs and business managers had been part of the network (p. 7(/8).

Seven chapters describe: how Schröder's network came into being, Putin's rise in Russia, the "exploitation of a social democratic myth" (namely Brandt's Ostpolitik), the German-Russian gas deals, Russia politics 1998–2013, Russia politics 2013–2021, and the situation after the invasion of February 2022.

In doing so, the authors introduce several people who belonged to Schröder's network or are part of the topic. First of all, there are a number of SPD politicians such as Heino Wiese, who helped organise the network, and also Lars Klingbeil, who, for example, worked as a staff member in the constituency offices of Schröder and Wiese. A larger part of the book is taken up by the descriptions of Wiese, Frank-Walter Steinmeier (Federal Minister and then Federal President), Sigmar Gabriel (Minister President in Lower Saxony and Federal Minister) and Stephan Weil (Minister President in Lower Saxony).

The authors reject the assumption that Schröder no longer played a role in his party after the end of his chancellorship (for example, because of anti-welfare-state Agenda 2010). This may be true for parts of the SPD, but not for the leadership of the federal SPD. They mention Frank-Walter Steinmeier and Sigmar Gabriel, for example. "In addition, there was a long list of elected officials and party staff who belong to the extended Schröder network. Whether in Hanover, Berlin or Schwerin, Schröder had people everywhere" (pp. 279/280).

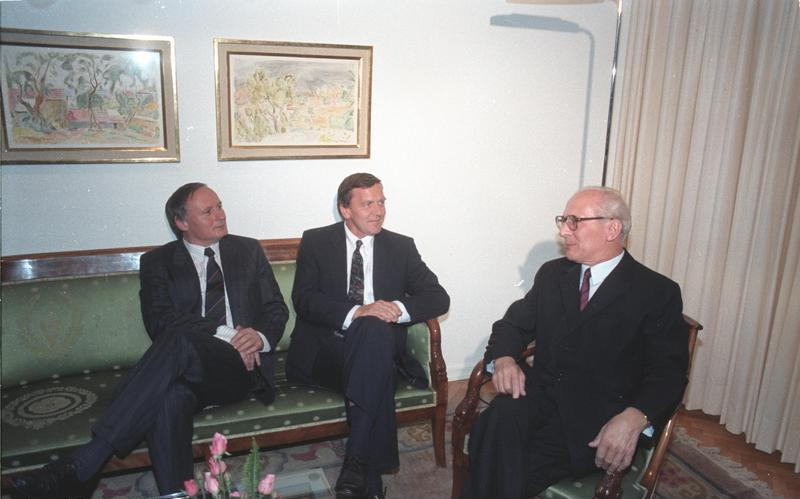
In 1987, GDR leader Erich Honecker visited the Federal Republic, including Saarbrücken. From left to right: Saarland Minister President Oskar Lafontaine, Lower Saxony's opposition leader Gerhard Schröder and Erich Honecker.

There were certain reasons why SPD politicians in particular had not taken a firm stand against Putin's power politics. In the case of Schröder, Bingener and Wehner mention "numerous biographical and habitual similarities" to Putin. They mention the sexism of Schröder's all-male rounds in Hanover, which Putin was able to follow up with his "cult of masculinity". Schröder had a "remarkably untroubled relationship with autocrats" throughout his career, such as Fidel Castro, Erich Honecker or Recep Tayyip Erdoğan (pp. 278/279).

Moreover, some SPD politicians were less anti-communist and less strongly anchored in the West than is generally assumed. Their desire for a German path between East and West shines through. Out of anti-Americanism, they wanted to get closer to Moscow in order to have more negotiating leeway in dealings with Washington (p. 280):

Putin speculated on his chance to break Germany out of the Western phalanx via the indirect route of the SPD and to do business with it over the heads of the Eastern Europeans ... The policy of détente, later pumped up into a social democratic myth, prevented people within the party from seeing through Putin's intentions.

Bingener and Wehner distinguish between Frank-Walter Steinmeier, Manuela Schwesig or Stephan Weil, who apparently had no financial interests of their own, and Schröder, Wiese and Gabriel, for whom the impression is quite different. Nevertheless, the latter may also have subjectively believed that they were contributing to "international cooperation" through their politics. Moscow alone is responsible for the war of aggression, but Schröder, Steinmeier and Gabriel "misjudged, played down, and in some cases even ignored" Russia's aggressiveness (pp. 280/281).

Bingener and Wehner also mention Angela Merkel and other politicians of the CDU/CSU as well as the Committee on Eastern European Economic Relations (Ost-Ausschuss der Deutschen Wirtschaft); in addition, politicians of Austria and other countries (including Wolfgang Schüssel, who became a member of the supervisory board of Lukoil, p. 131). Merkel had never had any illusions about Putin's character, but had not taken a decisive stance in the face of dependence on Russian gas or the weakening of the Bundeswehr. "She also continued to rely on diplomacy instead of toughness in the face of Russian provocations and attacks." Moreover, CDU/CSU politicians also had "sticky connections" to Russia that "would be worthy of their own consideration" (p. 276).

== Reactions ==
Nadine Conti in the Die Tageszeitung ironically criticised details in the book and the impression ostensibly created that "gentlemen's evenings and male silos were an invention of Schröder". According to the NZZ, German readers are now asking themselves "in which country they have been living until now". The book by Bingener and Wehner gives Schröder "a disastrous report card for his Russia policy".

Philipp Löpfe wrote for Watson that even after Schröder left the chancellery, his network remained largely unknown. Bingener and Wehner would now shine a light on this "dark room", with frightening, shocking results.

In the Frankfurter Rundschau, Michael Hesse said the book was one of the best on the background to the energy crisis. "Brilliantly written and incredibly exciting." At the same time, he pointed to the dubious role of the CDU/CSU and Merkel's turning a blind eye.

== Edition ==
- Reinhard Bingener, Markus Wehner: Die Moskau-Connection. Das Schröder-Netzwerk und Deutschlands Weg in die Abhängigkeit. C. H. Beck, München 2023, ISBN 978-3-406-79941-9.
