= United Nations Security Council Resolution 2334 =

2016 resolution condemning Israeli settlements

UN Security Council Resolution 2334
- Date: 23 December 2016
- Meeting no.: 7853
- Code: S/RES/2334 (Document)
- Subject: The situation in the Middle East
- Voting summary: 14 voted for; None voted against; 1 abstained
- Result: Adopted

Security Council composition
- Permanent members: China; France; Russia; United Kingdom; United States
- Non-permanent members: Angola; Egypt; Japan; Malaysia; New Zealand; Senegal; Spain; Ukraine; Uruguay; Venezuela

United Nations Security Council Resolution 2334 was adopted on 23 December 2016. It concerns the Israeli settlements in "Palestinian territories occupied since 1967, including East Jerusalem". The resolution passed in a 14–0 vote by members of the United Nations Security Council (UNSC). Four members with United Nations Security Council veto power (China, France, Russia, and the United Kingdom) voted for the resolution, while the United States abstained. The resolution states that Israel's settlement activity constitutes a "flagrant violation" of international law and has "no legal validity". It demands that Israel stop such activity and fulfill its obligations as an occupying power under the Fourth Geneva Convention.

It was the first UNSC resolution to pass regarding Israel and the Palestinian territories since Resolution 1860 in 2009, and the first to address the issue of Israeli settlements with such specificity since Resolution 465 in 1980. While the resolution did not include any sanction or coercive measure and was adopted under the non-binding Chapter VI of the United Nations Charter, Israeli newspaper Haaretz stated it "may have serious ramifications for Israel in general and specifically for the settlement enterprise" in the medium-to-long term.

The text was welcomed by much of the international community in the following days. According to Murray McCully, former Minister of Foreign Affairs for New Zealand, Resolution 2334 reinforces the international community's commitment to a negotiated outcome, while former Canadian ambassador Paul Heinbecker observed that, Israeli and Palestinian narratives notwithstanding, resolution 2334 "reflects what the world thinks. It does not constitute a minority view or even a very divided view. If this resolution of the 15-member UN Security Council were put to a vote in the 193-member General Assembly, the outcome would scarcely be different." In response, the government of Israel retaliated with a series of diplomatic actions against some members of the Security Council, and accused the administration of U.S. President Barack Obama of having secretly orchestrated the passage of the resolution. Palestine's representatives stated this was an opportunity to end the occupation and establish a Palestinian state to live side by side with the state of Israel on the 1967 line.

== Background ==
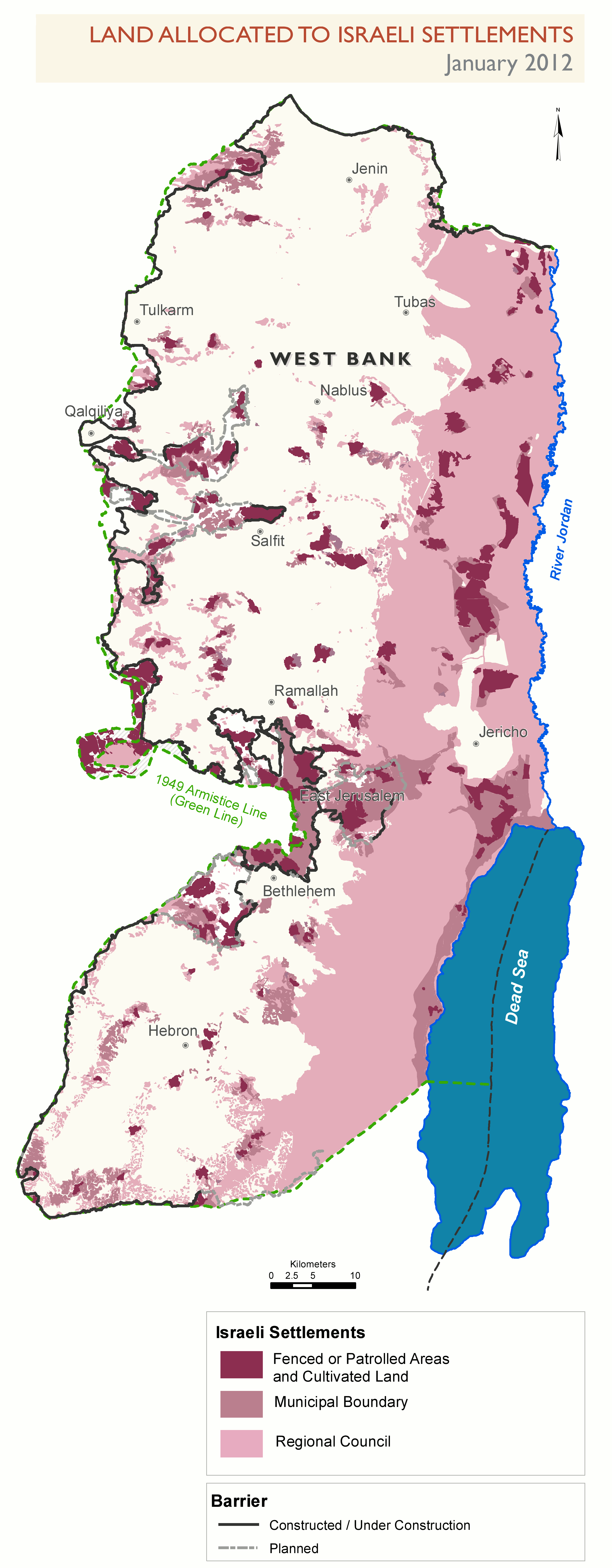
Parts of the West Bank allocated to the settlements, as of January 2012 (in pink and purple color).

Israeli settlements are Jewish Israeli civilian communities built on Palestinian lands occupied by Israel since the 1967 Six-Day War. Resolution 2334 concerns such settlements in the West Bank and East Jerusalem. The Fourth Geneva Convention makes it illegal for nations to move populations and establish settlements in territories acquired in a war, and an overwhelming number of countries consider the Israeli settlements to be illegal on that basis. Israel states that these are not "occupied" but "disputed" territories because "there were no established sovereigns in the West Bank or Gaza Strip prior to the Six Day War". This argument was rejected by the International Court of Justice in 2004.

The UN Security Council previously addressed Israeli settlements in UN Security Council Resolution 446 and Resolution 465. The Council also endorsed the Road map for peace, which required a freeze to settlement expansion in Resolution 1515. In February 2011, during Barack Obama's first administration, the US used its veto power to block a similar UN Security Council resolution and settlement activity grew substantially, with the settler population increasing by at least 100,000 during Obama's time in office. and The Quartet report in July 2016 said that 570,000 Israelis lived in the settlements. Prior to voting on the resolution, diplomats predicted that US frustration with the growth of settlements, as well as the poor relationship between President Obama and the Israeli Prime Minister Benyamin Netanyahu, might cause the US to abstain, rather than veto the resolution. Netanyahu was confident that Israel's diplomatic standing was on the rise, and that the world was no longer very interested in the Palestinian issue. Until the U.S. abstention led to the passage of UNSCR 2334, Obama had been unique among American presidents for not allowing any resolution critical of Israel to pass through the Security Council.

== Content ==
Resolution text

The resolution states that all measures aimed at changing the demographic composition and status of Palestinian territories occupied by Israel, including construction and expansion of settlements, transfer of Israeli settlers, confiscation of land, demolition of homes and displacement of Palestinian civilians are in violation of international humanitarian law, Israel's obligation as the occupying Power according to the Fourth Geneva Convention, and previous resolutions.

The resolution also condemns all acts of violence against civilians, including terrorism, provocation and destruction. According to the New York Times, this is "aimed at Palestinian leaders, whom Israel accuses of encouraging attacks on Israeli civilians". It reiterates support for the two-state solution and noted that settlement activities are "imperilling" its viability. The document also "underlines" that the UN Security Council "will not recognize any changes to 4 June 1967 lines, including with regard to Jerusalem, other than those agreed by the parties through negotiations"; and "calls" upon all states "to distinguish, in their relevant dealings, between the territory of the State of Israel and the territories occupied since 1967."

== Passage ==
The draft was originally presented by Egypt on the basis of a document prepared by British legal and diplomatic figures working together with the Palestinians, with Britain regarded as the key player in formulating the resolution and pressing for a vote.

High pressures were exerted to avoid the vote. On 22 December, United States President-elect Donald Trump called on Egyptian president Abdel Fattah el-Sisi to withdraw the proposal, and Egypt withdrew the nomination after what its ambassador called an "intense pressure". Then on 23 December, the draft was taken up and proposed again by Malaysia, New Zealand, Senegal and Venezuela. Israel unsuccessfully pressured New Zealand to withdraw its support, with Netanyahu telling Foreign Minister Murray McCully that support for the proposal would be considered by Israel as a "declaration of war". Britain encouraged New Zealand to keep pushing for a vote. Following a telephone conversation between Netanyahu and Vladimir Putin, the Russian ambassador to the UN Vitaly Churkin requested that the vote be postponed until after Christmas. His proposal failed to gain any support.

The resolution was passed 14 to 0; all members voted for the resolution except for the United States, which abstained. The United States ambassador, Samantha Power, explained the abstention by saying that on one hand the United Nations often unfairly targets Israel, that there are important issues unaddressed by the resolution, and that the US did not agree with every word in the text; while on the other hand the resolution reflects facts on the ground, that it reaffirms the consensus that the settlement activity is not legal, and that the settlement activity has gotten "so much worse" as to endanger the viability of the two-state solution.

Media and observers contrasted the US decision to abstain with its long-standing tradition of vetoing resolutions targeting Israel over the issues of settlements.

== Reactions ==
=== By Israel ===
The resolution was particularly controversial in Israel, given its criticism of the Israeli government. The Israeli government recalled its ambassadors from New Zealand and Senegal (Israel does not have diplomatic relations with Venezuela or Malaysia). Netanyahu declared that nations acting against Israel's interests will pay a diplomatic and economic price, and instructed the Foreign Ministry to cancel all aid programs to Senegal, some involving programmes to alleviate poverty, in response to the resolution's passage. Israel also cancelled the planned visits of the Senegalese foreign minister to Israel, and other visits of non-resident ambassadors of Senegal and New Zealand. A planned visit of the Ukrainian prime minister was also cancelled by Israel. Furthermore, Israel summoned and reprimanded the ambassadors of the United States, which abstained on the resolution, and ten countries which voted in favor of it. Netanyahu declared: "The resolution that was passed by the U.N. yesterday is part of the swan song of the old world that is biased against Israel." He questioned the Security Council's priorities given the mounting fatalities in the wars in Syria, the Sudan, and elsewhere in the Middle East. Israeli opposition leader Isaac Herzog responded that Netanyahu had "declared war this evening on the world, on the United States, on Europe, and is trying to calm us with conceit'", although Herzog also condemned the UN resolution.

During the meeting over the resolution, the Israeli ambassador Danny Danon denounced members who had approved it, comparing it to banning the French from "building in Paris". David Keyes, a spokesperson for Netanyahu, said President Barack Obama was behind the resolution and helped with both "formulating and pushing" it. Gerard van Bohemen, New Zealand's ambassador to the United Nations disputed this notion by saying that "we did not discuss the substance of the resolution at any time with the United States", and further noted that none of the other Security Council members were aware that the United States was planning to abstain. Shortly after the resolution's passage, the Israeli government announced it will not comply with its terms. The office of the Israeli Prime Minister stated that "the Obama administration not only failed to protect Israel against this gang-up at the UN, it colluded with it behind the scenes", adding: "Israel looks forward to working with President-elect Trump and with all our friends in Congress, Republicans and Democrats alike, to negate the harmful effects of this absurd resolution." The Israeli government also fears that the resolution's call to distinguish between the territories of Israel and the occupied territories will encourage the Boycott, Divestment and Sanctions movement. Netanyahu said that Israel has to reevaluate its ties with the UN following the adaptation by the Security Council. Days after the UN resolution, Avigdor Lieberman, Israel's defense minister urged Jews to leave France and move to Israel. On 6 January 2017, due to the passing of the UN Resolution, the Israeli government withdrew its annual dues from the organization, which totaled $6 million in United States dollars.

=== By Palestine ===
Palestinian President Mahmoud Abbas said, "The voting in favour of the resolution has not resolved the Palestinian cause, but defined it." He added, "The world said its word that settlement in the Palestinian territories occupied in 1967, including East Jerusalem, is illegal." He asked Israel "to sit together on the negotiation table to discuss all the outstanding issues between us and resolve it with good intentions", adding: "We are neighbors on this holy land and we want peace." Including a reference to the Arab Peace Initiative, he stated: "You (Israel) have your state, and we can have our state, and then we can live side-by-side in peace and security." He added, "If you accept, then there are 57 Arab and Islamic countries will be ready to recognize you."

Chief Palestinian negotiator Saeb Erekat said that "this is a day of victory for international law, a victory for civilised language and negotiation and a total rejection of extremist forces in Israel. The international community has told the people of Israel that the way to security and peace is not going to be done through occupation, but rather through peace, ending the occupation and establishing a Palestinian state to live side by side with the state of Israel on the 1967 line."

=== Reactions by Security Council states ===
- China: The Chinese Deputy Permanent Representative to the UN, Ambassador Wu Haitao, welcomed the resolution and said it reflects the common aspiration of the international community.
- France: The French Ambassador to the UN, François Delattre, said the resolution's adoption is "an important and historic event" and noted it was the first time that the Security Council had clearly stated the obvious, that settlement activities undermined a two-state solution.
- Malaysia: Prime Minister Najib Razak described the vote as "a victory to the people of Palestine".
- New Zealand: Foreign Minister Murray McCully stated that "we have been very open about our view that the [UN Security Council] should be doing more to support the Middle East peace process and the position we adopted today is totally in line with our long established policy on the Palestinian question" and that "the vote today should not come as a surprise to anyone and we look forward to continuing to engage constructively with all parties on this issue".
- Russia: The Ministry of Foreign Affairs of Russia issued a statement which said that "the Russian Federation voted for it because the resolution is based on tested formulas reflecting the general view of the international community, which have been reaffirmed many times, on the illegality of Israeli settlement plans in the Palestinian territory. (...) Our experience shows convincingly that a two-state solution to the Palestinian-Israeli conflict is only possible through direct talks between Palestinians and Israelis without any preconditions."
- Senegal: After several retribution measures were announced by Israel, Senegal Ministry of Foreign Affairs stated that his country "steadily supported the research of a fair and equitable solution to the Palestinian-Israeli conflict."
- Spain: The Spanish Ambassador to the UN and incumbent President of the UN Security Council, Román Oyarzun Marchesi, welcomed the resolution; he noted that Spain had always affirmed the illegality of the settlements and said the resolution was consistent with Spain's position.
- United Kingdom: The British Ambassador to the UN, Matthew Rycroft, welcomed the resolution and said it was a "clear reinforcement" of international belief in a two-state solution, that Israel's settlement expansion was "corroding the possibility" of a lasting peace in the Middle East and that "the settlement expansion is illegal." In reaction to John Kerry's speech, a spokesperson for the Prime Minister rebuked Kerry for focusing on the single issue of Israeli settlements and not the whole conflict, and said: "We do not... believe that the way to negotiate peace is by focusing on only one issue, in this case the construction of settlements, when clearly the conflict between the Israelis and Palestinians is so deeply complex." The spokesperson continued, in reaction to Kerry's statement about the makeup of the Netanyahu government, that "...we do not believe that it is appropriate to attack the composition of the democratically-elected government of an ally."
- United States: United States Secretary of State John Kerry said the United States could not "stand in the way of a resolution at the United Nations that makes clear that both sides must act now to preserve the possibility of peace" and said the resolution "rightly condemns violence and incitement and settlement activity." In a later speech he said that the Israeli Netanyahu government's agenda is driven by "extreme elements," that its policies are leading "towards one state" and that "if the choice is one state, Israel can either be Jewish or Democratic – it cannot be both. Kerry also said a peace agreement must be based on the 1967 lines, that all citizens must enjoy equal rights, that occupation must end, that the Palestinian refugee issue must be resolved, and that Jerusalem must be the capital of both states. He also said that the Security Council resolution "reiterates what has long been the overwhelming consensus international view on settlements" and that "if we had vetoed this resolution, the United States would have been giving license to further unfettered settlement construction that we fundamentally oppose."
- Venezuela: The Venezuelan Ambassador to the UN called the resolution's passage historic.
- Ukraine: Ukraine's ambassador to the United Nations Volodymyr Yelchenko compared Israel's settlement of the West Bank to the Russian occupation of Crimea. The Ukrainian Foreign Ministry stated that the Resolution's text was balanced: Israel was to desist from settlements, and Palestinians were to adopt measures to counter terrorism.

=== Reactions by other states ===
- Australia: Australia was one of the few countries to support the position of the Israeli government, implying that had they been on the UN Security Council they most likely would have voted against the resolution. Foreign Minister Julie Bishop stated that, "In voting at the UN, the Coalition Government has consistently not supported one-sided resolutions targeting Israel". Bishop also distanced the Australian government from remarks made by US Secretary of State John Kerry and President Barack Obama.
- Belgium: Foreign Minister and Deputy Prime Minister Didier Reynders welcomed the resolution, stating that "Belgium fully shares the position of the international community expressed in this resolution" and that "the settlement policy of the territories occupied by Israel is illegal, and its continuation seriously jeopardizes the possibility of a two-state solution."
- Germany: Foreign Minister and Chairman-in-Office of the OSCE Frank-Walter Steinmeier welcomed the resolution and said it confirms what has long been the position of the German government, stating that the Israeli settlement of occupied territory is an obstacle to peace and a two-state solution. He further said that "a democratic Israel is only achievable through a two-state-solution." Steinmeier later praised the speech by John Kerry which outlined the United States' position on the Israeli–Palestinian conflict and endorsed Kerry's principles for a solution to the conflict.
- Iran: Iranian Foreign Ministry Spokesman Bahram Qassemi welcomed the resolution.
- Norway: Foreign Minister Børge Brende welcomed the resolution and said it must be the basis for a solution to the Israeli–Palestinian conflict. He said that "it is important that Israel complies with it, because the settlements are in violation of international law".
- Sweden: Foreign Minister and Deputy Prime Minister Margot Wallström welcomed the resolution and said it confirms the position of both the EU and Sweden on the continued Israeli settlement of the occupied West Bank.
- Turkey: The Foreign Ministry welcomed the vote in a statement and urged Israel to abide by the Security Council decision and to halt all settlement activities in the Palestinian areas.

=== By non-state parties ===
==== International human rights organizations ====
Amnesty International said the "decision to finally pass a resolution condemning illegal Israeli settlements is a welcome step," that "the resolution includes a crucial demand that the Israeli authorities immediately halt all settlement activities in the Occupied Palestinian Territories. Such activities constitute a flagrant violation of international humanitarian law and, according to the Rome Statute of the International Criminal Court, constitute a war crime. We also welcome the resolution’s recognition of the illegality of Israeli settlements" and that the "Security Council must now ensure this resolution is respected."

Human Rights Watch stated that the resolution rebuked those looking to reverse the illegality of Israeli settlements in the West Bank and commended the countries who pushed the resolution forward. It advised the international community to remain resolute in its condemnation of illegal Israeli actions in the Occupied Territories and called for the dismantling of the settlements.

==== Debate in the United States ====
Shortly after the resolution passed, U.S. President-elect Donald Trump tweeted, "as to the UN, things will be different after 20 Jan.." Later he added: "We cannot continue to let Israel be treated with such total disdain and disrespect. They used to have a great friend in the U.S., but not anymore. The beginning of the end was the horrible Iran deal, and now this (U.N.)! Stay strong Israel, 20 January is fast approaching!". The passage, and the United States' decision to abstain rather than veto it, is controversial in the United States, which has used its veto power 42 times to protect Israel, including with respect to a very similar resolution in 2011. In reaction to the United States' abstention, Speaker of the House Paul Ryan stated that the abstention was "absolutely shameful" and a "blow to peace". Incoming Senate Minority Leader Charles Schumer said it was "extremely frustrating, disappointing and confounding" that the Obama administration failed to veto the UN's vote. The American organization J Street said "the resolution is consistent with long-standing bipartisan American policy, which includes strong support for the two-state solution, and clear opposition to irresponsible and damaging actions, including Palestinian incitement and terror and Israeli settlement expansion and home demolitions." The United States House of Representatives, on the other hand, voted 342–80 to condemn the UN Resolution on 5 January 2017.

== Ramifications ==
=== For the settlements ===
According to the Israeli newspaper Haaretz, there are no short-term practical ramifications for Israel with regards to the settlement activities. The Fourth Geneva Convention already makes it illegal for nations to move populations and establish settlements in territories acquired in a war, and an overwhelming number of countries already consider the Israeli settlements to be illegal on that basis. In addition, the resolution does not include any sanctions or coercive measures against those who violated it. However, in the medium or long term, the resolution might influence how the International Criminal Court in The Hague treats lawsuits filed against Israel, and may create a justification for countries and individual organizations to impose sanctions on the settlements. According to Ynet, the resolution makes it possible to file lawsuits against Israel and Israeli officials as well as Israeli citizens involved in settlement activity at the International Criminal Court and for sanctions to be imposed on Israel both by the UN and by individual countries.

=== Diplomacy ===
The Israeli government was said to be mulling retaliation, by a number of diplomatic and financial moves, against a number of nations which had sponsored or supported the resolution. The proposed measures consist of cutting funding to five UN institutions; blocking work visas for employees of the said agencies; expelling Chris Gunness, the spokesman for UNRWA; cancelling Israeli aid to Senegal directed at alleviating poverty; and cancelling a scheduled visit to Israel by Ukraine's Prime Minister Volodymyr Groysman. In addition, the Israeli government also recalled its ambassadors from Senegal and New Zealand.

UN Resolution 2334 had significant repercussions for Israel–New Zealand relations. Besides withdrawing its ambassador, Israel permanently downgraded relations with New Zealand, leaving a charge d'affairs in charge of the Israeli embassy in Wellington. Relations between New Zealand and Israel were subsequently restored in June 2017 after prolonged back-channel communications between the two governments. Prime Minister Bill English also penned a letter expressing regret at the damage caused to bilateral relations as a result of New Zealand proposing UN Resolution 2334.

=== Quarterly reports ===
The resolution "Requests the Secretary-General to report to the Council every three months on the implementation of the provisions of the present resolution;" In the first, delivered verbally at a security council meeting on 24 March 2017, United Nations Special Coordinator for the Middle East Peace Process, Nickolay Mladenov, noted that Resolution 2334 called on Israel to take steps to cease all settlement activity in the Occupied Palestinian Territory, that "no such steps have been taken during the reporting period" and that instead, there had been a marked increase in statements, announcements and decisions related to construction and expansion.

== See also ==
- List of United Nations Security Council Resolutions 2301 to 2400
- Occupied Palestine Resolution
- John Kerry Parameters
