= John Kerry Parameters =

2016 declaration of principles in the Israeli–Palestinian conflict

The John Kerry Parameters are a declaration of principles that seeks to serve as a framework for a final resolution to the long-standing Israeli–Palestinian conflict. They were proposed by US Secretary of State John Kerry on December 28, 2016, following the UN Security Council's approval of Resolution 2334, (Note: UN resolution press release reads: "Israel’s Settlements Have No Legal Validity, Constitute Flagrant Violation of International Law, Security Council Reaffirms") in which the United States refrained from using its veto. The plan includes the existence of two Israeli and Palestinian states side by side, with Jerusalem as the capital of both countries, an end to the occupation while fulfilling Israel's security needs, and a viable, demilitarized Palestinian state.

== Background ==
Malaysia, New Zealand, Senegal and Venezuela submitted a draft resolution condemning the settlement construction in the Palestinian territories occupied since 1967 and calling on Israel to desist from this act and to abide by its responsibilities under the Fourth Geneva Convention. Egypt was the original sponsor of the resolution, but after being under "intense" pressure, it withdrew the proposal. The resolution was passed by a vote of 14–0 with the abstention of the United States. The United States explained the abstention by saying that it agrees with some of its provisions, which is that settlements is illegal and a major obstacle to a two-state solution.

== Principles ==
The plan included six points based on the two-state solution:

1. "the establishment of secure and recognized borders between Israel and Palestine that are viable through negotiations on the basis of the 1967 borders with equal exchanges of land acceptable to both sides."
2. "The realization of the idea of United Nations General Assembly resolution 181 (1947) concerning two States and peoples, one Jewish and the other Arab, with mutual recognition and equal rights for each other's citizens."
3. "A just, acceptable, and realistic solution to the problem of the Palestine refugees, with international assistance, including compensation, options, assistance to find permanent housing, recognition of suffering and other actions necessary to be a full and harmonious solution with two States for two peoples." Kerry stressed that this solution "should not affect the essential character of Israel."
4. "To find a mutually acceptable solution to Jerusalem as the internationally recognized capital of the two States, and to protect and secure freedom of access to religious sites".
5. "To satisfy Israel's security needs in a satisfactory manner and end all occupation completely, while at the same time ensuring that Israel is able to defend itself effectively, and that Palestine can guarantee the security of its people in a sovereign and non-militarized state."
6. "Ending the conflict and all the pending demands so that normal relations can be established and regional security can be strengthened for all as mentioned in the peace initiative presented by Arab countries".

== Reactions ==
Prime Minister Benjamin Netanyahu immediately rejected the plan and criticized Kerry for attacking "the only democratic state in the Middle East". Palestinian Authority President Mahmoud Abbas expressed his readiness to resume the peace process if Israel stops settlement construction. The French foreign minister Jean-Marc Ayrault, who welcomed Kerry's speech, said he was "clear, committed and courageous".

== See also ==
- Israeli–Palestinian peace process
- Camp David Accords
- Oslo Accords
- The Clinton Parameters
- Road map for peace
- Trump peace plan
