= 2014 Minya court rulings =

Death sentences by the Egyptian court

Between the months of March and April 2014, a court in Minya, Egypt, has recommended the death sentence to hundreds of members and supporters of the banned Muslim Brotherhood over an attack on a police station in December 2013. The defendants included Mohamed Badie, the group's top leader, whose sentence was confirmed on June 21, 2014, along with 181 of the brotherhood's supporters. This came two months after the previous ruling decided to refer the case to the Egypt's Grand Mufti Shawki Ibrahim.

== March ruling ==
On March 24, 2014, the Minya Criminal Court sentenced 529 Muslim Brotherhood supporters to death. 147 of the defendants were in court for the trial while the others were convicted in absentia.
