= 2025 in South Korea =

- Centuries: 20th; 21st
- Decades: 2000s; 2010s; 2020s; 2030s
- See also: Other events of 2025; Years in South Korea; Timeline of Korean history 2025 in North Korea

The following lists events in 2025 in South Korea.

== Incumbents ==
| Office | Image | Name | Assumed office / Current length |
|---|---|---|---|
| President of the Republic of Korea | | Yoon Suk Yeol | 10 May 2022 – 4 April 2025 (Powers and duties suspended since 14 December 2024) Impeached on April 4 |
| President of the Republic of Korea | | Han Duck-soo | 14–27 December 2024 (Acting President) |
| President of the Republic of Korea | | Choi Sang-mok | 27 December 2024 – 24 March 2025 (Acting President) |
| President of the Republic of Korea | | Han Duck-soo | 24 March – 2 May 2025 (Acting President) |
| President of the Republic of Korea | | Lee Ju-ho | 2 May – 4 June 2025 (Acting President) |
| President of the Republic of Korea | | Lee Jae-myung | 4 June 2025 (17 months ago) |
| Speaker of the National Assembly | | Woo Won-shik | 5 June 2024 (2 years ago) |
| Chief Justice of the Supreme Court | | Cho Hee-dae | 8 December 2023 (2 years ago) |
| President of the Constitutional Court | | Moon Hyungbae | 18 October 2024 – 18 April 2025 (Acting) |
| President of the Constitutional Court | | Kim Hyungdu | 18 April – 23 July 2025 (Acting) |
| President of the Constitutional Court | | Kim Sanghwan | 24 July 2025 (15 months ago) |
| Prime Minister of the Republic of Korea | | Han Duck-soo | 21 May 2022 – 2 May 2025 (Powers and duties suspended from 27 December 2024 until 24 March) |
| Prime Minister of the Republic of Korea | | Choi Sang-mok | 27 December 2024 – 24 March 2025 (Acting Prime Minister) |
| Prime Minister of the Republic of Korea | | Lee Ju-ho | 2 May 2025 (18 months ago) (Acting Prime Minister) |
| Prime Minister of the Republic of Korea | | Kim Min-seok | 3 July 2025 (16 months ago) |

== Events ==
=== January ===
- 1 January – A day after Acting President Choi Sang-mok appointed two justices to the Constitutional Court, the chiefs of Office of the President, the policy office, the Office of National Security, the special adviser for foreign affairs and security, and the senior secretary express their intentions to resign to Choi.
- 3 January – Yoon Suk Yeol residence standoff: Investigators face a standoff with the Presidential Security Service outside the presidential residence after failing to execute a warrant to detain impeached President Yoon Suk Yeol for his failed martial law attempt.
- 4 January – A fishing boat sinks after hitting rocks off the coast of Gageodo, killing three people on board.
- 8 January – Former Democratic Party of Korea leader Song Young-gil is sentenced to two years' imprisonment for accepting illegal political funding from seven businesspeople.
- 10 January – Park Jong-jun resigns as head of the Presidential Security Service amid an investigation into the agency's role in obstructing President Yoon's arrest on 3 January.
- 14 January –
  - At least 43 vehicles figure in a pileup caused by icy conditions along the Seoul-Munsan Expressway near Goyang, injuring nine people.
  - The first formal hearings into the impeachment of Yoon Suk Yeol are held by the Constitutional Court of Korea.
- 15 January – Arrest of Yoon Suk Yeol: Yoon Suk Yeol becomes the first sitting president of South Korea to be arrested following his imposition of martial law in December.
- 17 January – South Korea opens an embassy in Cuba for the first time.
- 18 January – 2025 Seoul Western District Court riot: Supporters of Yoon Suk Yeol storm the Seoul Western District Court after the latter extends his detention.
- 21 January – A civilian employee of the Korea Defense Intelligence Command is sentenced by a court-martial to 20 years' imprisonment for providing information on undercover South Korean military agents to a suspected Chinese agent in return for 400 million won.
- 22 January – The government announces a reduction in subsidies to biomass enterprises and an end to supporting the construction of new biomass plants amid criticism over its impact on deforestation.
- 23 January –
  - The Constitutional Court votes 4-4 to reject the impeachment of Korea Communications Commission chair Lee Jin-sook, who had been impeached by the National Assembly on 2 August 2024 for administrative abuses.
  - Three people, including a Filipino-Canadian national, are arrested for processing and attempting to sell 61 kilograms of cocaine valued at 30 billion won ($24 million) from a warehouse in Hoengseong County, Gangwon Province, in what is described as the largest cocaine-related crime in South Korea.
  - The National Bio Committee, an advisory committee directly under the President, is launched.
- 24 January – The government issues revisions to the Wildlife Protection and Management Act that include a ban on bear farming and feeding feral pigeons and other animals considered pests.
- 26 January – Yoon Suk Yeol becomes the first sitting president of South Korea to be indicted following his imposition of martial law in December, with charges of insurrection and abuse of power being filed against him.
- 28 January – Air Busan Flight 391: An Airbus A321-200 operated by Air Busan catches fire before takeoff at Gimhae International Airport, resulting in seven injuries and the evacuation of all 176 people on board.

=== February ===
- 1 February –
  - Two fishing vessels run aground off the coast of Jeju Island, killing two people and leaving two others missing.
  - A fire breaks out at the National Hangeul Museum in Seoul, injuring one firefighter. No damage is recorded to the museum's collection.
- 4 February – The Seoul High Court overturns the conviction of former Ulsan mayor Song Cheol-ho and former city police chief Hwang Un-ha for election interference over a conspiracy to engineer an investigation against a rival during the 2018 South Korean local elections.
- 7–14 February – South Korea at the 2025 Asian Winter Games in Harbin, China: South Korea concludes its participation at the competition with 16 gold medals.
- 7 February – A magnitude 3.1 earthquake hits Yangseong-myeon, 22 kilometers northwest of Chungju, North Chungcheong Province.
- 9 February – A fishing vessel sinks off the coast of Habaek Island near Yeosu, killing four people and leaving five others missing.
- 10 February –
  - One person is killed in the explosion of an oil storage tank in Ulsan.
  - An eight-year old girl is fatally stabbed at an elementary school in Daejeon, with a teacher confessing to the killing.
- 12 February – A fishing vessel capsizes off the coast of Jeju Island, leaving five crew members missing.
- 13 February – A fishing vessel catches fire off the coast of Buan County, leaving six crew members missing.
- 14 February –
  - Footballer Hwang Ui-jo is sentenced to a one-year suspended prison sentence for secretly filming sexual encounters with three different women.
  - Six people are killed in a fire at an under-construction resort in Busan.
  - A man is arrested for attempting to storm the Chinese embassy in Seoul to carry out an attack.
- 16 February – Actress Kim Sae-ron is found dead in her home in Seoul in what police rule to be a suicide.
- 17 February – The government suspends the local service of the Chinese artificial intelligence application DeepSeek, citing data collection concerns.
- 19 February –
  - The first formal hearings into the impeachment of Han Duck-soo are held by the Constitutional Court of Korea.
  - The Seoul High Court approves the retrial of Korean Central Intelligence Agency director Kim Jae-gyu, who was convicted and executed for the assassination of Park Chung Hee in 1979.
  - Democratic Party MP Lee Sang-sik is issued with a 3-million won (US$2,084) fine by the Suwon District Court for making a false statement of his assets while campaigning for the 2024 South Korean legislative election.
  - Four officials of the Moon Jae-in administration, namely former national security adviser and Foreign Minister Chung Eui-yong; former presidential chief of staff Noh Young-min, former National Intelligence Service director Suh Hoon, and former Unification Minister Kim Yeon-chul are convicted and sentenced to suspended prison terms of up to ten months by the Seoul Central District Court over the forced repatriation of two North Korean fishermen who had killed 16 of their colleagues in the Sea of Japan in 2019.
- 20 February – The criminal trial of Yoon Suk Yeol over his martial law declaration begins in Seoul, making him the first incumbent president of South Korea to stand trial in a criminal case.
- 25 February –
  - A bridge being built as part of the Seoul-Sejong City expressway collapses in Anseong, killing four workers.
  - The Constitutional Court concludes its hearings into the impeachment of Yoon Suk Yeol.
- 26 February –
  - A man is shot dead by police in Gwangju after stabbing an officer.
  - Hyundai Rotem wins a 2.2 trillion-won (US$1.53 billion) contract to supply advanced trains to the Moroccan national railway operator ONCF.
- 27 February –
  - The Constitutional Court rules that acting President Choi Sang-mok's decision to withhold the appointment of Ma Eun-hyuk as a justice in the Constitutional Court violated the National Assembly's right to elect a justice to the court but dismisses a petition to have Ma appointed immediately.
  - The Ministry of Unification dismisses Cho Min-ho as president of the Korea Hana Foundation supporting North Korean defectors amid allegations of him sexually and verbally harassing employees.

=== March ===
- 6 March –
  - Two KF-16 fighter aircraft of the Republic of Korea Air Force drop their ordnance by accident on a civilian area of Pocheon during a drill, injuring 29 people.
  - A taxi crashes into a wall in Ulju, Ulsan, killing four people.
- 7 March – The Seoul Central District Court cancels President Yoon's arrest warrant, citing procedural flaws. He is released the next day.
- 13 March – The Constitutional Court votes 8-0 to reject the impeachment of Board of Audit and Inspection chair Choe Jae-hae, who had been impeached by the National Assembly in December 2024 for failing to adequately review suspected irregularities regarding the 2022 relocation of the presidential office and residence.
- 14 March –
  - The first case of foot-and-mouth disease in South Korea since 2023 is detected at a cattle farm in Yeongam.
  - The United States Department of Energy includes South Korea on the lowest level of its Sensitive and Other Designated Countries List effective 15 April, prompting concerns over bilateral cooperation on technological affairs.
- 17 March – A military drone crashes into a parked helicopter while landing at an airbase in Yangju, causing a fire that destroys the latter aircraft.
- 21 March –
  - 2025 South Korea wildfires: Wildfires break out in the central and southern regions of the country, killing at least 31 people and prompting the declaration of a state of national disaster in South Gyeongsang, North Gyeongsang and Ulsan the next day.
  - Two Chinese nationals are arrested in Suwon for taking photographs of sensitive military and aviation infrastructure.
- 23 March – A Seoul Metropolitan Subway train derails after colliding with a buffer while departing from a depot at Sindorim Station. No injuries are reported.
- 24 March –
  - The Constitutional Court votes 7–1 to overturn the impeachment of prime minister Han Duck-soo, allowing his reinstatement as acting president.
  - A motorist is killed after falling into a sinkhole that emerges in Gangdong District, Seoul.
- 25 March – 2025 South Korea wildfires: The Gounsa temple in Uiseong, which dates back from the Silla Dynasty, is destroyed by wildfires.
- 26 March –
  - The Truth and Reconciliation Commission finds the government responsible for facilitating a program in the 1970s and 1980s that saw 200,000 children being sent abroad for adoption through processes that involved abuse and fraud.
  - The Seoul High Court overturns the conviction of Democratic Party of Korea leader Lee Jae-myung for perjury during the 2022 presidential election.
  - 2025 South Korea wildfires: A firefighting helicopter crashes in Uiseong, killing the pilot.
- 29 March – A spectator is killed by a falling piece of aluminium during a KBO League match between NC Dinos and LG Twins at Changwon NC Park in Changwon, prompting the cancellation of KBO and KBO Futures League matches on 1 April.

=== April ===
- 2 April – Authorities announce the seizure of two tons of cocaine valued at 1 trillion won (US$679.6 million) from a Norwegian-flagged vessel that arrived at Gangneung from Mexico via Ecuador, Panama and China, in what is deemed the biggest drug bust in terms of weight in South Korea by the Korea Customs Service.
- 2 April –
  - Hong Nam-pyo is dismissed as mayor of Changwon following the upholding of his conviction by the Supreme Court for electoral fraud during the 2022 South Korean local elections.
  - The United States bars the entry of sea salt products from the Taepyung salt farm in Sinan County, citing concerns over the use of forced labor.
- 4 April – The Constitutional Court unanimously upholds the impeachment of Yoon Suk Yeol, leading to his immediate removal as president.
- 6 April – 2025 South Korea wildfires: A firefighting helicopter crashes in Daegu, killing the pilot.
- 8 April –
  - A group of North Korean soldiers enter the South Korean side of the eastern section of the DMZ, prompting warning shots from South Korean forces that force them to retreat.
  - The Korea Disease Control and Prevention Agency announces the approval for usage of Barythrax, a vaccine for anthrax that was produced in collaboration with GC Pharma and is deemed the first genetically engineered anthrax vaccine in history.
- 10 April –
  - The Constitutional Court unanimously rejects the impeachment of justice minister chair Park Sung-jae, who had been impeached by the National Assembly on 12 December 2024 for involvement in the 2024 South Korean martial law crisis.
  - Syria and South Korea establish diplomatic relations for the first time.
- 11 April –
  - A construction site of the Sinansan Line collapses in Gwangmyeong, killing one worker.
  - The Revealing Truth: Jeju 4·3 Archives on the Jeju uprising and the Forest Rehabilitation Records dealing with reconstruction efforts following the Korean War are included in the Memory of the World Programme by UNESCO.
- 15 April – Five members of the same family are found murdered in an apartment in Yongin.
- 18 April – A KA-1 light attack aircraft of the Republic of Korea Air Force accidentally jettisons its gun pods and fuel tanks during exercises over Pyeongchang, Gangwon.
- 21 April – An apartment building in Gwanak-gu, Seoul is burned, killing the suspect and injuring six.
- 22 April – One person is killed and another is injured in a knife attack at a supermarket near Mia station in Seoul. A suspect is arrested.
- 24 April – Former president Moon Jae-in is indicted for corruption over allegations that he had facilitated the employment of his former son-in-law at Eastar Jet, in exchange for the airline's founder, Lee Sang-jik, being appointed as head of the Korea SMEs and Startups Agency.
- 28 April – Six people are injured in a knife attack carried out by a student inside a high school in Cheongju.

=== May ===
- 1 May –
  - The Supreme Court overturns the acquittal of Lee Jae-myung for perjury and sends the case back to the Seoul High Court.
  - Han Duck-soo resigns as acting president and prime minister. He declares his candidacy for president the next day.
  - Choi Sang-mok resigns as finance minister minutes before a scheduled vote in the National Assembly on whether to impeach him.
- 2 May – Education Minister and Deputy Prime Minister for Social Affairs Lee Ju-ho assumes the role of acting president.
- 4 May – Two workers are killed after inhaling toxic gases at a paper mill in Jeonju.
- 6 May – At least three people are injured in a knife attack in Bongcheon-dong, Seoul. The suspect is arrested.
- 7 May – Philosopher Byung-Chul Han is awarded the Princess of Asturias Awards for his writings on the ills of digital technology and contemporary capitalism.
- 11 May – Han Duck-soo ends his presidential campaign following a failed attempt to make him the official candidate of the People Power Party despite the previous nomination of Kim Moon-soo.
- 15 May – Academician Choi Jung-wha becomes the first Korean woman to be awarded the Officier grade of the French Legion of Honour for her contributions towards promoting France-South Korea relations.
- 17 May – A massive fire breaks out a manufacturing plant of Kumho Tire in Gwangju, triggering a nationwide firefighting mobilization order.
- 19 May – Two people are killed while two others are injured in a stabbing spree in Siheung.
- 22 May – Four people, including the perpetrator and three police officers, are injured in a knife attack in Paju.
- 27 May – Former acting presidents Han Duck-soo and Choi Sang-mok are barred from leaving the country as part of criminal investigations into Yoon Suk Yeol's insurrection case relating to his martial law declaration.
- 28 May – A strike is held by the Busan bus drivers' union demanding a wage increase, causing transport disruptions in the city until an agreement is reached in the afternoon.
- 29 May – A Lockheed P-3 Orion patrol aircraft of the Republic of Korea Navy crashes during a training flight in Pohang, killing all four on board.
- 31 May – A man is arrested following an arson attack inside a Seoul Metropolitan Subway train traveling between Yeouinaru and Mapo stations. He is sentenced to 12 years' imprisonment by the Seoul Southern District Court on 14 October.

=== June ===
- 3 June – 2025 South Korean presidential election: Lee Jae-myung is elected president.
- 4 June –
  - Lee Jae-myung is inaugurated as president.
  - President Lee nominates MP Kim Min-seok as prime minister.
- 5 June – South Korea qualifies for the 2026 FIFA World Cup after defeating Iraq 2-0 at the 2026 FIFA World Cup qualification in Basra.
- 7 June – A strike is held by the Ulsan bus drivers' union demanding a wage increase, causing transport disruptions in the city until an agreement is reached 19 hours later.
- 10 June –
  - The Cuban embassy in South Korea is inaugurated in Seoul as part of the establishment of diplomatic relations between the two countries.
  - A KF-16 fighter aircraft of the Republic of Korea Air Force participating in the Red Flag – Alaska military exercise in the United States crashes during takeoff at the Eielson Air Force Base in Alaska, injuring its two crew.
- 11 June – The Republic of Korea Armed Forces suspends loudspeaker broadcasts across the DMZ into North Korea as part of efforts "restore trust" between the two Koreas.
- 17 June – South Korea ratifies the Hague Adoption Convention.
- 23 June – President Lee nominates MP Ahn Gyu-back as defense minister, making him the first person not to have previously served as a general to be chosen for the position since 1961.
- 27 June – Six US nationals are caught in Ganghwa Island for attempting to send various items include rice and Bibles across the maritime border into North Korea.
- 29 June – Two people are injured in a knife attack in Gwanak District, Seoul. The attacker commits suicide.

=== July ===
- July – 2025 EAFF E-1 Football Championship (women)
- 3 July –
  - The National Assembly amends the country's guidelines on martial law in response to the 2024 South Korean martial law crisis by barring security forces from obstructing the work of MPs and entering the National Assembly Building without approval from the Speaker.
  - The National Assembly approves the nomination of Kim Min-seok as prime minister following a 173-3 vote and a boycott by the People Power Party.
- 4 July – A North Korean civilian defects to the South by crossing through the DMZ with the help of the Republic of Korea Armed Forces.
- 7 July – Kim Min-seok is inaugurated as prime minister at the Government Complex in Sejong City.
- 7–16 July – 2025 EAFF E-1 Football Championship: South Korea finishes in second place after losing to Japan 1-0 at the final in Yongin Mireu Stadium.
- 9 July – South Korea repatriates six North Koreans after their vessels had drifted across their maritime border.
- 10 July –
  - Former president Yoon Suk Yeol is arrested again on charges related to the 2024 South Korean martial law crisis.
  - K-pop singer and former NCT member Taeil is sentenced to 3.5 years' imprisonment by the Seoul Central District Court for sexually assaulting a woman in 2024.
- 11 July – The Bangudae Petroglyphs are designated as World Heritage Sites by UNESCO.
- 16 July – The posthumous retrial of Kim Jae-gyu for the assassination of Park Chung Hee in 1979 begins in Seoul.
- 17 July – The Supreme Court upholds the acquittal of Samsung chair Lee Jae-yong on fraud charges.
- 18 July – Poet Kim Hyesoon becomes the first Asian to win the Germany-based International Literature Award for her poetry collection, "Autobiography of Death".
- 24 July – At least 23 people are killed and more than 15,000 others are evacuated following days of flooding and landslides caused by torrential rain nationwide.
- 30 July – US President Donald Trump imposes a 15% tariff on South Korea's exports to the United States.
- 31 July – Three sailors are injured in an engine fire aboard the Republic of Korea Navy landing ship ROKS Hyang Ro Bong as it enters the port of Jinhae.

=== August ===
- 1 August –
  - The Seoul Western District Court convicts 49 people for participating in the 2025 Seoul Western District Court riot in January and sentences them to up to five years' imprisonment.
  - Former interior minister Lee Sang-min is arrested over his involvement in the 2024 South Korean martial law crisis.
- 4 August – The Republic of Korea Armed Forces begins removing loudspeakers along the DMZ as part of efforts to reduce tensions with North Korea.
- 12 August –
  - Former first lady Kim Keon Hee is arrested following a warrant by the Seoul Central District Court on charges of involvement in a stock manipulation scheme, election meddling and bribery.
  - The Seoul Central District Court orders the government to compensate the relatives of Lt. Col. Kim Oh-rang, a military officer who was killed while fighting rebel forces loyal to Chun Doo-hwan during the 1979 South Korean coup d'état.
- 13 August – At least three people are killed following heavy rainstorms in the Seoul Metropolitan Area.
- 14 August – The Supreme Court of Korea rejects a lawsuit by American composer Johnny Orly accusing the South Korean children's content company Pinkfong of plagiarizing his version of "Baby Shark", citing melodic differences.
- 15 August – Imprisoned former justice minister and Rebuilding Korea Party leader Cho Kuk, who had been convicted on charges of academic fraud involving his daughter, is released following an amnesty issued by President Lee on the occasion of National Liberation Day.
- 16 August – A fire breaks out on an oil tanker and a cargo ship moored next to each other in Yeosu, killing one person and injuring two others.
- 18 August –
  - President Lee signs an amendment to the Broadcasting Act reducing the government and the National Assembly's power to name board directors of the Korean Broadcasting System, Munhwa Broadcasting Corporation and the Educational Broadcasting System.
  - President Lee signs into law the Grain Management Act, requiring the government to purchase surplus rice to stabilize prices during market fluctuations.
- 19 August –
  - A passenger train hits a group of rail workers conducting inspection works in Cheongdo, killing two and injuring four.
  - A group of North Korean soldiers enter the South Korean side of the central section of the DMZ, prompting warning shots from South Korean forces that force them to retreat.
- 28 August – The Personal Information Protection Commission issues a 134.8 billion won (US$96.9 million) fine on SK Telecom over a massive data breach that affected its entire 23 million user base from 2021 to 2025.
- 30 August – President Lee declares a state of national disaster over Gangneung due to drought.
- 31 August – The Fair Trade Commission issues a 2.1 billion won (US$1.5 million) fine on the Chinese e-commerce firm AliExpress for misleading consumers with false discount rates for products sold on its platform.

=== September ===
- 3 September – Three people are killed in a stabbing at a restaurant in Gwanak District, Seoul.
- 10 September –
  - Choi Mal-ja, a woman who was convicted of grievous bodily harm and sentenced to 10 months' imprisonment in 1964 for biting off the tongue of a man who tried to sexually assault her in Gimhae, is acquitted following a retrial in Busan.
  - Ten soldiers are injured in an artillery explosion at a military base in Paju.
  - Seven soldiers are injured in a mine explosion at a military base in Jeju Island.
- 11 September –
  - The National Assembly approves a motion to arrest PPP lawmaker Kweon Seong-dong on charges of bribery.
  - Around 340 people, including 316 South Koreans, who were arrested by the United States Immigration and Customs Enforcement at a raid on a Hyundai-LG battery plant under construction in Georgia, are repatriated to South Korea aboard a chartered Korean Air flight from Atlanta.
- 12 September – A case of avian influenza is discovered at a poultry farm in Paju.
- 14 September –
  - FIFA issues CHF40,000 in fines to the Korea Football Association and Gwangju FC over the latter's violation of a player registration ban imposed in December 2024.
  - A case of African swine fever is reported at a pig farm in Yeoncheon County, Gyeonggi.
- 15 September –
  - Heo Seok-gon is removed as Commissioner General of the National Fire Agency along with his deputy, Lee Young-pal, amid an investigation over their involvement in the 2024 South Korean martial law crisis.
  - Kim Yong-jin resigns as Commissioner General of the Korea Coast Guard amid an investigation over the drowning death of an assistant inspector of the agency.
- 17 September – The Republic of Korea Navy launches its Aegis-class destroyer Dasan Jeong Yak-yong at the HD Hyundai Heavy Industries shipyard in Ulsan.
- 18 September – President Lee designates Muan and Hampyeong Counties in South Jeolla as special disaster zones due to heavy rains.
- 23 September –
  - Hak Ja Han, the leader of the Unification Church, is arrested as part of an investigation into her allegedly bribing former first lady Kim Keon Hee and PPP lawmaker Kweon Seong-dong.
  - Aricell CEO Park Soon-kwan is sentenced to 15 years' imprisonment on charges relating to the Hwaseong battery factory fire in 2024.
  - A KF-16 fighter jet of the Republic of Korea Air Force undergoes a runway excursion at an air base in Chungju. No casualties are reported.
- 25 September –
  - Actress Hwang Jung-eum is sentenced to a two year prison term suspended for four years by the Jeju District Court for embezzling more than 4.2 billion won (US$3 million) from a company that she owned to invest in cryptocurrency.
  - A man is arrested for attempting an arson attack at the Ministry of Employment and Labor in Sejong City.
- 26 September –
  - A North Korean merchant vessel crosses the Northern Limit Line into South Korea, prompting the South Korean military to fire warning shots that forces it to retreat.
  - A fire breaks out at the National Information Resources Service in Daejeon, injuring one person and triggering massive disruptions in 70 online government services and websites. One person participating in restoration efforts subsequently dies in a fall at the Government Complex, Sejong on 3 October.
  - The Korea Financial Industry Union holds a strike demanding a 4.5-day workweek and a 3.9% wage increase.
- 27 September – Twenty-eight people are injured in a gas explosion at a jjimjilbang in Yangju.

=== October ===
- 1 October – A strike is launched by employees demanding improved working conditions at 15 airports nationwide.
- 2 October –
  - President Lee issues an apology for the adoption of Korean children overseas in the 1970s and 1980s through processes that involved abuse and fraud.
  - The Ministry of Land, Infrastructure and Transport issues fines of up to 18 million won on Asiana Airlines and Aero K for failing to properly notify passengers of baggage issues and flight delays in violations of the Aviation Business Act.
  - Former Korea Communications Commission chair Lee Jin-sook is detained on charges of violating election laws and breaching political neutrality through her appearance on conservative YouTube channels. She is released on 4 October following a judicial review.
- 16 October –
  - The Supreme Court of Korea overturns a divorce settlement that would have seen Chey Tae-won, the head of SK Group, pay 1.38 trillion won ($1 billion), to his former wife, Roh Soh-yeong.
  - The Seoul Central District Court sentences a Chinese national to five years' imprisonment for attempting to bribe South Korean soldiers to divulge military secrets.
- 18 October – Sixty-four South Korean nationals are repatriated from Cambodia after being rescued from scam centers.
- 19 October –
  - A North Korean soldier defects to South Korea by crossing the central section of the DMZ.
  - A group of 20 North Korean soldiers briefly cross a section of the DMZ near Paju before retreating following warning shots by South Korean forces.
- 21 October – The Seoul Southern District Court acquits Kim Beom-soo, the head of Kakao, on charges of manipulating the stock prices of K-pop firm SM Entertainment to ensure his takeover of the latter.
- 25 October – Lee Sang-kyeong resigns as First Vice Land Minister following widespread criticism over remarks he made regarding housing issues.
- 31 October – 2025 Korean Series: In baseball, the LG Twins defeat the Hanwha Eagles in five games to win their fourth Korean Series title.
- October 31 – 1 November – APEC South Korea 2025

=== November ===
- 4 November – One person is killed while two others are injured in a knife attack at the office of a redevelopment cooperative in Cheonho-dong, Gangdong District of Seoul.
- 6 November –
  - A boiler tower collapses at a thermal power plant operated by Korea East-West Power Co. in Ulsan, killing seven people.
  - The Presidential Security Service issues an official apology for obstructing the arrest of Yoon Suk Yeol in January.
- 9 November – A Chinese fishing boat capsizes off the coast of Gageodo, leaving two crew members dead, three missing and the remaining six crew rescued.
- 10 November –
  - A Chinese fishing boat capsizes off the coast of Gunsan, leaving nine crew members missing and the remaining two crew rescued.
  - A case of avian influenza is discovered at a poultry farm in Hwaseong.
  - 2024 South Korean martial law crisis: Former president Yoon Suk Yeol, along with former defense minister Kim Yong-hyun and former DCC commander Yeo In-hyung, are indicted on charges alleging their participation in sending surveillance drones to North Korea to stoke tensions and justify ordering martial law.
- 11 November – A court overturns the 2024 conviction of actor O Yeong-su for sexual misconduct.
- 12 November – Former National Intelligence Service director Cho Tae-yong is arrested on charges of involvement in the 2024 South Korean martial law crisis.
- 13 November – A truck crashes into the Jeil Market in Bucheon, killing four people and injuring 17 others.
- 17 November –
  - A pileup involving 13 vehicles along the Sangju-Yeongcheon expressway in Yeongcheon kills two people and injures four others.
  - A case of avian influenza is discovered at another poultry farm in Hwaseong.
- 18 November – A cybersecurity breach affecting data belonging to around 33.4 million customers of the e-commerce platform Coupang is discovered.
- 19 November –
  - The ferry Queen Jenuvia 2 runs aground off Sinan County, South Jeolla, injuring five people.
  - A group of North Korean soldiers briefly cross a section of the DMZ before retreating following warning shots by South Korean forces.
- 20 November – A soldier carrying out demining activities along the DMZ is injured in an accidental explosion in Paju.
- 24 November –
  - A rental van plows into pedestrians in Udo, killing three people and injuring 10 others.
  - The Seoul Central District Court sentences Kim Nok-wan to life imprisonment for leading an online blackmail ring that resulted in the sexual assault of 261 people.
  - An MQ-9 Reaper drone of the US Air Force crashes into the Yellow Sea off Maldo-ri island in Gunsan.
- 27 November –
  - The Korea AeroSpace Administration launches its largest satellite, weighing 516 kg (1,138 lb), from the Naro Space Center.
  - A cyberattack is carried out on the cryptocurrency exchange firm Upbit, resulting in losses of around 54 billion won (US$36.9 million).
  - South Korea imposes sanctions on more than 115 individuals and entities over their involvement in transnational crimes and online scams in Southeast Asia that targeted South Korean nationals.
- 29 November – Lee Jae-yong is dismissed as head of the National Information Resources Service amid charges of negligence over the 26 September fire that devastated nationwide online government services.

=== December ===
- 1 December – Two people are killed in a knife attack at a motel in Changwon. The attacker dies in a suspected fall from the premises.
- 2 December – Four people, including three soldiers, are injured in an accidental explosion of an anti-aircraft shell during a drill at an army training center in Paju.
- 4 December –
  - The South Korean government acknowledges that six of its nationals have been detained in North Korea since the period between 2013 and 2016.
  - A fishing boat capsizes off the coast of Taean County, leaving three crew members dead and another missing.
- 8 December – A court in Seoul sentences two people to up to four years' imprisonment for blackmailing footballer Son Heung-min.
- 10 December – PPP legislator Ihn Yohan resigns from the National Assembly.
- 11 December –
  - Chun Jae-soo resigns as oceans minister amid allegations that he had accepted bribes from the Unification Church when he was a member of the National Assembly.
  - Four people are killed following a collapse at an under-construction library in Gwangju.
  - Cryptocurrency figure Do Kwon is sentenced to 15 years' imprisonment by a court in the United States for fraud.
- 12 December – Oh Seung-keol resigns as head of the Korea Institute for Curriculum and Evaluation amid criticism over inappropriate difficulty levels in the selection of questions for the College Scholastic Ability Test.
- 15 December –
  - Laos–South Korea relations: South Korea and Laos upgrade their bilateral relations to a comprehensive partnership.
  - The Seoul Central District Court convicts former Defense Counterintelligence Command commander Major General Noh Sang-won for collecting the personal information of military intelligence officers in connection with the 2024 South Korean martial law crisis and sentences him to two years' imprisonment.
- 17 December – Former deputy land minister Kim Oh-jin is arrested on charges of favoritism over the transfer of the presidential residence from Cheong Wa Dae to the Yongsan Presidential Office in 2022.
- 18 December –
  - The Constitutional Court unanimously upholds the impeachment of National Police Agency chief Cho Ji-ho for ordering the disruption of activities by the National Assembly during the 2024 South Korean martial law crisis, resulting in his immediate removal from office.
  - One person is killed in a collapse at a construction site at the Yeouido station of the Seoul Metropolitan Subway.
  - The Seoul High Court overturns the convictions of incumbent Democratic Party MP Heo Jong-Sik and former Democratic Party MPs Youn Kwan-suk and Lim Jong-seong of exchanging cash envelopes to support former party leader Song Young-gil in a party leadership contest in 2021.
- 26 December – The Seoul Central District Court acquits former National Security Adviser Suh Hoon, former National Intelligence Service Director Park Jie-won, former Defense Minister Suh Wook, former Korea Coast Guard Commissioner General Kim Hong-hee and former NIS chief secretary Noh Eun-chae on charges of covering up the 2020 murder of a South Korean fisheries official by North Korean soldiers near the Northern Limit Line.
- 28 December – Five members of the same family are found dead in separate apartments in Gyeongsan.
- 29 December – The Office of the President of the Republic of Korea officially returns to its previous headquarters at Cheong Wa Dae.
- 30 December –
  - Ryu Chul-whan resigns as head of the Anti-Corruption and Civil Rights Commission amid criticism over his handling of corruption cases involving former first lady Kim Keon-hee.
  - Kim Byung-kee resigns as floor leader of the Democratic Party in the National Assembly amid criticism over allegations of misconduct, preferential treatment and abuse of power.

== Holidays ==
As per Presidential Decree No. 28394, 2017. 10. 17., partially amended, the following days are declared holidays in South Korea:

- 1 January – New Year's Day
- 27 January to 31 January – Korean New Year
- 1 March – March 1st Movement Day
- 5 May – Children's Day South Korea
- 5 May – Buddha's Birthday
- 6 June – Memorial Day
- 15 August – National Liberation Day
- 3 October – National Foundation Day
- 5 October to 7 October – Chuseok
- 9 October – Hangul Day
- 25 December – Christmas Day

== Art and entertainment ==
- 2025 in South Korean music
- 2025 in South Korean television
- List of South Korean films of 2025
- List of 2025 box office number-one films in South Korea
- 30th Busan International Film Festival
- List of South Korean submissions for the Academy Award for Best International Feature Film

== Deaths ==
- 2 February – Lee Joo-sil, 80, actress (The Uncanny Counter, Train to Busan, Squid Game).
- 7 February – Song Dae-kwan, 78, singer
- 16 February –
  - Kim Sae-ron, 24, actress (The Man from Nowhere, The Neighbor, Bloodhounds)
  - Gil Won-ok, 96, human rights activist and comfort woman.
- 24 February – Jeong Su-il, 90, North Korean-born spy and historian.
- 10 March – Wheesung, 43, singer.
- 31 March – Chang Je-won, 57, politician, member of the National Assembly (2008–2012, 2016–2024).
- 31 March – Kim Shin-jo, 82, North Korean-born commando (Blue House raid) and pastor.
- 10 April – René Marie Albert Dupont, 95, French-born Roman Catholic prelate, bishop of Andong (1969–1990).
- 27 May – Choi Jung-woo, 68, actor (Like a Virgin, City Hunter, Doctor Stranger).
- 4 August – Song Young-gyu, 55, actor.
- 5 August – Lee Min, 46, singer.
- 15 August – Timothy Yu Gyoung-chon, 62, Roman Catholic prelate, auxiliary bishop of Seoul (since 2013).
- 12 September – Kim Seong-min, 63, North Korean-born political activist.
- 16 October – Baek Se-hee, 35, author (I Want to Die but I Want to Eat Tteokbokki).
- 25 November – Lee Soon-jae, 91, actor (Good Morning President, Grandpas Over Flowers, Idol School) and politician, MP (1992–1996).
- 28 November – Lee Moon-soo, 76, actor (My Son, Good Morning President, Late Blossom).
- 29 November – Seo Dong-kown, 93, lawyer, prosecutor general (1985–1987).
- 8 December – Yun Il-bong, 91, actor (Suddenly at Midnight, Oyster Village, Obaltan).
- 9 December – Kim Ji-mee, 86, actress, producer, and film planner (Ticket, Gilsotteum).
- 11 December – Kim Woo-Nam, 70, politician.

== See also ==
=== Country overviews ===
- South Korea
- History of Korea
- Outline of South Korea
- Government of South Korea
- Cabinet of South Korea
- Politics of South Korea
- Years in South Korea
- Timeline of Korean history

=== Related timelines for current period ===
- 2025
- 2020s
- 2020s in political history
