= 2025 in Korea =

2025 in Korea may refer to:

- 2025 in North Korea
- 2025 in South Korea
