= 2026 in Korea =

2026 in Korea may refer to:

- 2026 in North Korea
- 2026 in South Korea
