= 2027 in North Korea =

- Centuries: 20th; 21st
- Decades: 2000s; 2010s; 2020s
- See also: Other events of 2027; Years in North Korea; Timeline of Korean history 2027 in South Korea

The following is a list of events from the year 2027 in North Korea.

== Events ==
=== Predicted or scheduled ===
- North Korea could gain enough nuclear material for 200 nuclear warheads
- If the South Korean request is accepted by the Vatican, Pope Leo XIV could visit North Korea

== Holidays ==
- 1 January – New Year's Day
- 6 February – Seollal
- 8 February – Korean People's Army Foundation Day
- 16 February – Birthday of Kim Jong-Il
- 8 March – International Women's Day
- 15 April – Birthday of Kim Il-sung
- 25 April – Chosun People's Army Foundation Day
- 1 May – May Day
- 6 June – Chosun Children's Union Foundation Day
- 27 July – Day of Victory in the Great Fatherland Liberation War
- 15 August – Liberation Day
- 25 August – Day of Songun
- 9 September – National Day
- 25 September – Hangawi
- 10 October – Party Foundation Day
- 16 November – Mother's Day
- 27 December – Constitution Day
