= Kim Ha-neul (disambiguation) =

Kim Ha-neul (born 1978) is a South Korean actress.

Kim Ha-neul may also refer to:

- Kim Ha-neul (golfer) (born 1988), South Korean female golfer
- Kim Ha-nul (figure skater) (born 2002), South Korean female figure skater
- Kang Ha-neul (born Kim Ha-neul on 1990), South Korean actor
- Kim Ha-neul (born 2017), South Korean murder victim
