= 2026 in South Korea =

- Centuries: 20th; 21st
- Decades: 2000s; 2010s; 2020s; 2030s
- See also: Other events of 2026; Years in South Korea; Timeline of Korean history 2026 in North Korea

Scheduled events in 2026 in South Korea.

== Incumbents ==
Office	Image	Name	Tenure
President of the Republic of Korea		Lee Jae-myung	4 June 2025–present
Speaker of the National Assembly		Woo Won-shik	5 June 2024–29 May 2026
Speaker of the National Assembly		Cho Jeong-sik	5 June 2026–present
Chief Justice of the Supreme Court		Cho Hee-dae	8 December 2023–present
President of the Constitutional Court		Kim Sanghwan	24 July 2025–present
Prime Minister of the Republic of Korea		Kim Min-seok	3 July 2025–30 June 2026
Prime Minister of the Republic of Korea		Han Seong-sook	30 June 2026–present

== Events ==
=== January ===
- 2 January – A KAI T-50 Golden Eagle of the Republic of Korea Air Force overturns during an emergency landing at Gwangju Air Base in Gwangju. Both pilots are unharmed.
- 16 January –
  - Former president Yoon Suk Yeol is convicted and sentenced to five years' imprisonment on charges of abuse of power, obstruction of justice and falsification of documents in one of four trials relating to the 2024 South Korean martial law crisis.
  - A massive fire breaks out at Guryong Village in Gangnam, Seoul.
- 21 January – Former prime minister Han Duck-soo is convicted and sentenced to 23 years' imprisonment on charges relating to the 2024 South Korean martial law crisis.
- 28 January – Former first lady Kim Keon Hee is convicted and sentenced to 20 months' imprisonment on charges of accepting bribes from the Unification Church.

=== February ===
- 9 February – An AH-1S Cobra attack helicopter of the Republic of Korea Army crashes in Gapyeong County, killing its two crew.
- 10 February – Authorities carry out raids on the National Intelligence Service and the Korea Defense Intelligence Command as part of investigations into drone flights carried out into North Korea.
- 12 February – Former interior minister Lee Sang-min is convicted and sentenced to seven years' imprisonment on charges relating to the 2024 South Korean martial law crisis.
- 19 February – Former president Yoon Suk Yeol is convicted and sentenced to life imprisonment for insurrection relating to the 2024 South Korean martial law crisis.
- 25 February – An F-16 fighter jet of the Republic of Korea Air Force crashes near Yeongju, North Gyeongsang Province. The pilot safely ejects.
- 26 February – A Truth and Reconciliation Commission is convened to investigate anomalies in the international adoption of South Korean children.

=== March ===
- 5 March – President Lee orders the activation of a ₩100 trillion (about US$68 billion) stabilization fund to address volatility in the country's financial markets linked to the 2026 Iran war.
- 13 March — Police raid the headquarters of the Ministry of Land, Infrastructure and Transport in Sejong City as part of a renewed investigation into the crash of Jeju Air Flight 2216 in 2024.
- 16 March – A child is injured after being hit at a playground by a stray bullet suspected to have been fired during nearby military exercises in Daegu.
- 20 March – Fourteen people are killed in a fire at a car parts factory in Daejeon.

=== April ===
- 28 April – The Seoul High Court extends former first lady Kim Keon Hee's prison term for corruption from 20 months to four years.
- 29 April – The Seoul High Court sentences former president Yoon Suk Yeol to seven years' imprisonment on charges related to the 2024 South Korean martial law crisis.

=== May ===
- 17 May – North Korean team Naegohyang Women's FC arrive in Incheon to compete at the AFC Women's Champions League in Suwon, the first time a North Korean sports team has been sent to the South since 2018.
- 20 May – North Korean team Naegohyang Women's FC defeats South Korean side Suwon FC Women at the semifinals of the AFC Women's Champions League in Suwon.
- 23 May – Naegohyang Women's FC wins the 2025–26 AFC Women's Champions League after defeating Tokyo Verdy Beleza 1–0 at the final in Suwon.
- 26 May – An overpass demolition site in Seodaemun District, Seoul, collapses, killing three people and injuring three others.

=== June ===
- 1 June – An explosion hits a factory operated by Hanwha Aerospace in Daejeon, killing five people.
- 3 June –
  - 2026 South Korean by-elections
  - 2026 South Korean local elections
- 5 June – Public assemblies and citizen gatherings continue following the shortage of ballots in local elections, primarily centered around the Olympic Handball Gymnasium in Jamsil-dong, Seoul.
- 10 June – The PIPC issues a 624.6 billion won ($400 million) fine on Coupang over a 2025 data breach that exposed around 37.5 million users.
- 11 June–19 July – South Korea participates at the participates at the 2026 FIFA World Cup.
- 12 June – Former president Yoon Suk Yeol is sentenced to 30 years' imprisonment for sending drones into North Korea as part of efforts to stage provocations to justify the imposition of martial law in 2024.
- 22 June – Former justice minister Park Sung-jae is sentenced to 25 years' imprisonment for his role in abetting the imposition of martial law in 2024.
- 24 June – Lee Man-hee, the founder of the Shincheonji Church of Jesus, is arrested on charges of electoral interference over the recruitment of thousands of followers into the People Power Party.
- 30 June – Kim Min-seok resigns as prime minister and is replaced by Han Seong-sook.

=== July ===
- 1 July – The Ministry of Science and ICT officially launches the state-run artificial intelligence company "K-AGI" to boost national competitiveness in the AI sector.
- 7 July – The Supreme Court upholds the 7-year prison sentence and 5-year suspended sentence for former President Yoon Suk Yeol, who was convicted on charges of inciting insurrection and interfering with official duties by ordering his security service to block the execution of a court warrant.
- 13 July – The National Assembly passes a bill to abolish the Ministry of Unification, transferring its functions to the Ministry of Foreign Affairs and other relevant departments, in line with the current administration's realignment of inter-Korean policy.
- 18 July – The first vehicle rolls off the production line at the newly built KGM Commercial electric truck plant in Gunsan.
- 19–29 July – 48th session of the World Heritage Committee in Busan.
- 23 July – A special investigation team consisting of police and prosecutors raids the headquarters and branches of the National Election Commission over allegations that some employees manipulated data to cover up errors in the voter turnout count from the June 3 local elections.
- 25 July – The getbol tidal flats are designated as UNESCO World Heritage Sites.
- 29 July – The Korea Aerospace Research Institute announces the successful test flight of the first domestically developed high-altitude unmanned aerial vehicle capable of operating at altitudes exceeding 12 kilometers for more than 24 hours.
- 29 July – Busan records its highest-ever temperature of 38.8 °C (101.8 °F). The heatwave results in at least nine heat-related deaths across the country since May.

=== August ===
- 10 August – Two former Chinese military officers are arrested in separate incidents on suspicion of spying.
- 17 August –
  - US President Donald Trump orders the Pentagon to reduce annual joint military exercises with South Korea, saying that the latter refused to help with the 2026 Iran war and citing his good relationship with North Korean leader Kim Jong Un.
  - One person is killed in a landslide in Geoje.
- 24 August – A police officer is arrested for issuing false information following the discovery of four bodies linked to missing persons cases in Jeju Province.
- 31 August – A court in Seoul sentences Unification Church leader Han Hak-ja to two years' imprisonment for bribery involving former first lady Kim Keon Hee.

=== September ===
- 2 September – A court sentences an elderly care home director in Incheon to 15 years' imprisonment for sexually assaulting three of his patients.
- 4 September – One person is killed in a crane collapse caused by strong winds generated by Tropical Storm Krovanh in the Port of Jeju.
- 5 September–4 November – The Yeosu World Island Exhibition is held in Yeosu, South Jeolla Province.
- 21 September – Three soldiers are injured in a suspected landmine explosion along the DMZ.
- 23 September – Ukraine announces that two North Korean soldiers that had been captured while fighting for Russia had been transferred to South Korea.

=== October ===
- 1 October – K-pop singer and Winner member Mino is convicted of failing 102 times to report at a community center in Seoul as part of an alternative arrangement under the military service act and is sentenced to a suspended one-year prison term.
- 8 October – South Korea recalls its ambassador to Ukraine, citing the latter's decision to reveal the transfer of North Korean POWs the previous month.
- 10 October – Parts of a plaster ceiling collapse at a supermarket in Daegu, injuring 38 people.
- 13 October – Six women and two men are injured in a stabbing attack at a shopping mall in Incheon.

=== November ===
- 5 November – The Defence Ministry announces plans to expand the operations of its anti-piracy Cheonghae Unit to waters near the Strait of Hormuz.
- 11 November – A pileup involving 32 vehicles injures 57 people in Seongnam.
- 17 November – An unspecified number of suspected Russian aircraft briefly enter South Korea's air defence identification zone over the Sea of Japan, forcing the Republic of Korea Armed Forces to scramble fighter jets.
- 22 November – Choi Kyo-jin resigns as education minister amid criticism over instances of cheating in the 2026 edition of the College Scholastic Ability Test held on 19 November.

== Holidays ==
As per Presidential Decree No. 28394, 2017. 10. 17., partially amended, the following days are declared holidays in South Korea:

- 1 January – New Year's Day
- 16 – 18 February – Korean New Year
- 1 March – March First Movement
- 5 May – Children's Day
- 24 May – Buddha's Birthday
- 6 June – Memorial Day
- 15 August – National Liberation Day of Korea
- 24 – 27 September – Chuseok
- 3 October – National Foundation Day
- 9 October – Hangul Day
- 25 December – Christmas Day

== Art and entertainment ==
- List of South Korean submissions for the Academy Award for Best International Feature Film
- 2026 in South Korean television
- List of South Korean films of 2026
- 2026 in South Korean music
- 31st Busan International Film Festival

== Deaths ==
- 1 January – Jeon Jun-ho, 50, baseball player (Hyundai Unicorns, Woori Heroes, SK Wyverns).
- 4 January – Kim Young-in, 85, actor (Dachimawa Lee, No Blood No Tears, Arahan).
- 5 January – Ahn Sung-ki, 74, actor (Silmido, Two Cops, Radio Star).
- 11 January – Park Soon-yong, 81, lawyer, prosecutor general (1999–2001).
- 14 January – Kim min-jae, 53, baseball player.
- 20 January – Li Chang-Su, 58, North Korean-born judoka and defector to South Korea.
- 25 January –
  - Lee Hae-chan, 73, prime minister (2004–2006), minister of education (1998–1999) and MNA (1988–2020).
  - Gong Ro-myung, 93, diplomat and politician, minister of foreign affairs (1994–1996).
- 8 February – Jung Jin-woo, 88, film director (Oyster Village, Adultery Tree) and producer (Woman of Fire).
- 11 February – Jung Eun-woo, 39, actor (Five Fingers, One Well-Raised Daughter, The Return of Hwang Geum-bok).
- 10 March – Kim Yong-chae, 94, politician, mayor of Nowon District (1996–1998).
- 5 May – Lee Hong-koo, 91, prime minister (1994–1995) and ambassador to the United States (1998–2000).
- 29 August – Lee Yong-joo, 44, actor.
- 13 September – Chung Ho-yong, 94, politician and general, minister of the interior (1987) and defense (1987–1988).
- 29 October – Choi Bool-am, 86, actor (1st Republic, The Last Witness), television presenter (Korean Cuisine and Dining) and academic.
