= Ha-young =

- Hangul: 하영
- RR: Hayeong
- MR: Hayŏng

Ha-young or Ha-yeong, is a Korean given name.

== People ==
Notable people with the name include:

- Ahn Hayoung (born 1993, 안하영), South Korean actress and model, also known mononymously as Ha-Young (하영)
- Celine Song (born 1988, 송하영), born Song Ha-Young, South Korean-Canadian Academy-Award nominated filmmaker known for Past Lives (2023) and Materialists (2025).
- Song Ha-young (송하영), South Korean singer of Fromis 9
- Oh Ha-young (born 1996, 오하영), known by the mononym Hayoung, South Korean singer and actress
- Hayoung, a member of the Zoo Entertainment girlgroup Badkiz
- Hayoung, a member of the TS Entertainment boyband TRCNG
- Yi Ha-yeong (이하영); Minister of Justice for the Korean Empire at the end of its independence from Japan
- Seong Hayeong, a Korean commander during the 1894-1895 Donghak Peasant Revolution
- O Ha-yeong, a South Korean politician; see List of members of the National Assembly (South Korea), 1950–1954
- Jang Hayeong (born 1986, 장하영), convicted of child abuse murder that rose to national headlines in the death of Jeong-In

== Fictional characters ==
- Do Ha-yeong (도하영), a character from The Return of Superman; see List of The Return of Superman episodes
- Ha-yeong, a character from the South Korean TV show Monstrous (TV series)
- Song Ha-young, a character from the South Korean TV show Through the Darkness (TV series)
- Hayeong, featured in the webcomic 'Unstoppable Hayeong' by 'woo_eong' on Webtoon.
