= 2027 in South Korea =

- Centuries: 20th; 21st
- Decades: 2000s; 2010s; 2020s; 2030s
- See also: Other events of 2027; Years in South Korea; Timeline of Korean history 2027 in North Korea

Scheduled events in 2027 in South Korea.

== Events ==
=== Predicted and scheduled ===
- 1–12 August – 2027 Summer World University Games
- 3–8 August – World Youth Day 2027

== Holidays ==
As per Presidential Decree No. 28394, 2017. 10. 17., partially amended, the following days are declared holidays in South Korea:

- 1 January – New Year's Day
- 7 – 9 February – Korean New Year
- 1 March – March First Movement
- 5 May – Children's Day
- 13 May – Buddha's Birthday
- 6 June – Memorial Day
- 15 August – National Liberation Day of Korea
- 14 – 16 September – Chuseok
- 3 October – National Foundation Day
- 9 October – Hangul Day
- 25 December – Christmas Day

== Art and entertainment ==
- 2027 in South Korean music
- List of South Korean films of 2027
- 2027 in South Korean television

== Music ==
- The 41st Golden Disc Awards
- The 34th Hanteo Music Awards
