= 2024 in Korea =

2024 in Korea may refer to:

- 2024 in North Korea
- 2024 in South Korea
