= List of international trips made by Tô Lâm =

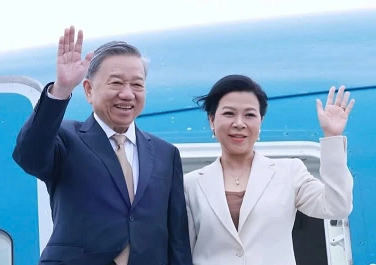
Tô Lâm and his wife departing Vietnam for Cuba in 2024.

This is a list of international trips made by Tô Lâm, who has served as general secretary of the Communist Party of Vietnam (CPV) since August 2024 and the 13th & 15th president of Vietnam from May 2024 to October 2024 and since April 2026.

== Summary ==
The number of visits per country where he has travelled are:

- One visit to: Australia, Azerbaijan, Belarus, Belgium, Bulgaria, Canada, Cuba, Denmark, Finland, India, Indonesia, Ireland, Japan, Kazakhstan, Malaysia, Mongolia, New Zealand, North Korea, the Philippines, South Korea, Sri Lanka, Thailand, and the United Kingdom
- Two visits to: France, Russia, and Singapore
- Three visits to: Cambodia, China, Laos and the United States

World map highlighting countries visited by Tô Lâm during his leadership, as of September 2026 One visit Two visits Three visits Vietnam

== 2024 ==
#	Dates	Country	Locations	Details
1	11–12 July	Laos	Vientiane	State visit.
1	12–13 July	Cambodia	Phnom Penh	State visit.
2	18–20 August	China	Guangzhou, Beijing	State visit. Met with CCP General Secretary Xi Jinping
3	21–25 September	United States	New York City	Working visit. Attended the 79th United Nations General Assembly
3	25–27 September	Cuba	Havana	State visit.
4	30 September–1 October	Mongolia	Ulaanbaatar	State visit.
4	1–3 October	Ireland	Dublin	State visit.
4	3–7 October	France	Paris, Villers-Cotterêts	Official visit. Attended the 19th Francophonie Summit.
5	21–23 November	Malaysia	Kuala Lumpur	State visit.

== 2025 ==
#	Dates	Country	Locations	Details
6	9–11 March	Indonesia	Jakarta	State visit.
6	11–13 March	Singapore	Singapore	Official visit.
7	5–7 May	Kazakhstan	Astana	State visit. Met with Kassym-Jomart Tokayev. Attended the Astana Victory Day Parade on Kazakh Eli Square.
7	7–8 May	Azerbaijan	Baku	State visit.
7	8–11 May	Russia	Moscow	Official visit. Attended the 2025 Moscow Victory Day Parade.
7	11–12 May	Belarus	Minsk	State visit. Met with President Alexander Lukashenko.
8	10–13 August	South Korea	Seoul, Busan	State visit.
9	9–11 October	North Korea	Pyongyang	State visit. Attended the 80th anniversary of the founding of the Korean Workers' Party.
10	20–22 October	Finland	Helsinki	Official visit.
10	22–24 October	Bulgaria	Sofia	Official visit.
11	28–30 October	United Kingdom	London, Oxford	Official visit.
12	1–2 December	Laos	Vientiane	State visit. Attended the 50th National Day celebrations of Laos.

== 2026 ==
#	Dates	Country	Locations	Details
13	5–6 February	Laos	Vientiane	State visit.
13	6 February	Cambodia	Phnom Penh	State visit.
14	18–20 February	United States	Washington D.C.	Working visit. Attended the inaugural meeting of the Board of Peace.
15	14–17 April	China	Beijing, Baoding, Nanning	State visit. Met with CCP General Secretary Xi Jinping.
16	5–7 May	India	New Delhi, Mumbai	State visit.
16	7–8 May	Sri Lanka	Colombo	State visit.
17	27–29 May	Thailand	Udon Thani, Bangkok	State visit.
17	29–31 May	Singapore	Singapore	State visit. Attended the Shangri-la Dialogue.
17	31 May–1 June	Philippines	Manila	State visit.
18	9–12 August	Australia	Sydney, Canberra	State visit.
18	12–14 August	New Zealand	Auckland	State visit.
19	7–9 September	Russia	Moscow	Official visit.
19	10–11 September	France	Paris	Official visit. Attended the International Space Summit.
20	20–23 September	United States	New York City	Official visit. Attended the United Nations General Assembly’s high-level debate.
20	23–25 September	Canada	Ottawa	State visit.
21	19–21 October	Denmark	Copenhagen	State visit.
21	21–24 October	Belgium	Brussels	State visit & meet EU leaders.
22	8–11 November	Japan	Tokyo, Kanagawa	Official visit.
23	14–17 November	Cambodia	Phnom Penh	Attended 20th Francophonie summit.
23	17–20 November	China	Shenzhen	Attended the APEC China 2026.

== See also ==
- List of international prime ministerial trips made by Phạm Minh Chính
- List of international prime ministerial trips made by Lê Minh Hưng
- List of international trips made by Xi Jinping
