= List of international prime ministerial trips made by Lê Minh Hưng =

Prime Minister Lê Minh Hưng with President Vladimir Putin in Russia, June 2026

Lê Minh Hưng has served as Prime Minister of Vietnam since 8 April 2026. As of 14 November 2026, Hưng has made five international trips to five countries as prime minister.

== Summary ==
As of 14 November 2026, the number of visits per country where Hưng travelled are:

- One: Russia, India, Laos, and Cambodia
- Two: Philippines

World map highlighting the countries visited by Lê Minh Hưng during his premiership: (14 November 2026) Vietnam One visit Two visits Three visits Four visits Five visits Six visits 7 or more visits

== 2026 ==
#	Country	Location	Date	Details	Image
1	Philippines	Cebu	7–8 May	Attended the 48th ASEAN Summit and related summits. Met with Philippine President Bongbong Marcos, Singaporean Prime Minister Lawrence Wong, Lao Prime Minister Sonexay Siphandone, Thai Prime Minister Anutin Charnvirakul, Indonesian President Prabowo Subianto, and ASEAN Secretary-General Kao Kim Hourn.	
2	Russia	Kazan	16–18 June	Attended the ASEAN–Russia Commemorative Summit marking the 35th anniversary of ASEAN–Russia relations. Met with Russian President Vladimir Putin, Tatarstan Head Rustam Minnikhanov, and Russian Direct Investment Fund CEO Kirill Dmitriev.	
3	India	New Delhi	12–13 September	Attended the 18th BRICS Summit. Met with Indian Prime Minister Narendra Modi, Russian President Vladimir Putin, Indonesian President Prabowo Subianto, Philippine President Bongbong Marcos, Malaysian Prime Minister Anwar Ibrahim, UN Secretary-General António Guterres, and WHO Director-General Tedros Adhanom Ghebreyesus.	
4	Laos	Vientiane	8–9 October	Official visit. Met with Prime Minister Saleumxay Kommasith.	
4	Cambodia	Phnom Penh	9–10 October	Official visit. Met with Prime Minister Hun Manet.	
5	Philippines	Metro Manila	14–17 November	Attended the 49th ASEAN Summit and related summits. Met with Australian Prime Minister Anthony Albanese and IMF Managing Director Kristalina Georgieva.	

== Upcoming trips ==
Country	Location	Date	Details

== Multilateral meetings ==
Prime Minister Hưng attended or is scheduled to attend the following summits during his prime ministership:

Group	Year				
Group	2026	2027	2028	2029	2030
ASEAN (EAS)	6–8 May, (Philippines) Cebu	TBA	TBA	TBA	TBA
ASEAN (EAS)	16–18 November, (Philippines) Manila	TBA	TBA	TBA	TBA
BRICS	12–13 September, (India) New Delhi	TBA	TBA	TBA	TBA
██ = Future event ██ = Did not attend

== See also ==
- List of international prime ministerial trips made by Phạm Minh Chính, Hưng's predecessor
- List of international trips made by Tô Lâm
