= List of international prime ministerial trips made by Phạm Minh Chính =

Prime Minister Phạm Minh Chính with Brazilian President Luiz Inácio Lula da Silva in Japan, May 2023

This is a list of international prime ministerial trips made by Phạm Minh Chính, who served as Prime Minister of Vietnam from 5 April 2021 to 8 April 2026.

== Summary ==
The number of visits per country where he has travelled are:

- One visit to: Algeria, Australia, Belgium, Brunei, Cambodia, Czech Republic, Dominican Republic, Estonia, Hungary, India, Kuwait, Luxembourg, The Netherlands, New Zealand, Poland, Qatar, Romania, Saudi Arabia, Singapore, South Africa, South Korea, Sweden, Turkey, United Kingdom
- Two visits to: France, Indonesia, Malaysia, Russia, Switzerland, United Arab Emirates
- Three visits to: Brazil, Japan, United States
- Four visits to: Laos
- Five visits to: China

World map highlighting the countries visited by Phạm Minh Chính during his premiership: Vietnam One visit Two visits Three visits Four visits Five visits

== 2021 ==
| # | Country | Location(s) | Dates | Details | Image |
|---|---|---|---|---|---|
| 1 | United Kingdom | Glasgow | 31 October–3 November | Chính travelled to Glasgow to attend the 2021 United Nations Climate Change Conference. | |
| 1 | France | Paris | 3–5 November | Official visit. Met with Prime Minister Jean Castex. | |
| 2 | Japan | Tokyo | 22–25 November | Chính is the first foreign guest hosted by the Prime Minister Fumio Kishida. | |

== 2022 ==
| # | Country | Location(s) | Dates | Details | Image |
|---|---|---|---|---|---|
| 3 | United States | Washington, D.C. | 10–13 May | Met with President Joe Biden and Vice President Kamala Harris, along with other ASEAN leaders, at the White House for the ASEAN–US Special Summit. | |
| 4 | Cambodia | Phnom Penh | 8–13 November | Official visit. Chính attended the 40th and 41st ASEAN Summits and related summits. Held bilateral meetings with Cambodian Prime Minister Hun Sen and Filipino President Bongbong Marcos. | |
| 5 | Luxembourg | Luxembourg | 9–10 December | Official visit. | |
| 5 | Netherlands | Amsterdam | 10–13 December | Official visit. | |
| 5 | Belgium | Brussels | 13–16 December | Official visit. Attended the ASEAN–EU Commemorative Summit marking the 45th anniversary of ASEAN–EU relations. | |

== 2023 ==
| # | Country | Location | Date | Notes | Image |
|---|---|---|---|---|---|
| 6 | Laos | Vientiane | 11–12 January | Official visit. Co-chaired the 45th meeting of the Vietnam–Laos Intergovernmental Committee. | |
| 7 | Singapore | Singapore | 8–10 February | Official visit. The two sides witnessed the exchange of four cooperation documents between the two governments and their respective agencies and businesses. | |
| 7 | Brunei | Bandar Seri Begawan | 10–11 February | Official visit. The two sides witnessed the signing and exchange of the Action Programme implementing the Comprehensive Partnership for 2023–2027 and the exchange of diplomatic notes on the visa exemption agreement for holders of diplomatic and official passports between Vietnam and Brunei. | |
| 8 | Indonesia | Labuan Bajo | 9–11 May | Working visit. Attended the 42nd ASEAN Summit. Met with Filipino President Bongbong Marcos. | |
| 8 | United States | Washington, D.C. | 12 May | Met with United States President Joe Biden at the White House. During the meeting, the two leaders discussed Vietnam–United States bilateral relations and regional and international issues. He also met with executives from leading American corporations as well as businesses led by Vietnamese Americans. | |
| 9 | Japan | Hiroshima | 19–21 May | Attended the 49th G7 summit. | |
| 10 | China | Beijing, Tianjin | 25–28 June | Met with President Xi Jinping at the Great Hall of the People. This was the first official visit to China by a Vietnamese Prime Minister in seven years. It was also the first in-person meeting between the two countries' top leaders following China's completion of its new state leadership appointments. At the invitation of Premier Li Qiang, he also attended the World Economic Forum. | |
| 11 | Indonesia | Jakarta | 4–7 September | Working visit. Attended the 43rd ASEAN Summit, the 18th East Asia Summit, and related meetings. Met with Filipino President Bongbong Marcos. | |
| 12 | United States | Washington, D.C. | 20 September | Delivered a policy speech at the Edmund A. Walsh School of Foreign Service of Georgetown University on Vietnam's foreign policy and Vietnam–United States relations. Met with United States government and congressional officials, including Secretary of Commerce Gina Raimondo and Speaker of the House Kevin McCarthy. | |
| 13 | Brazil | Rio de Janeiro | 23–26 September | Official visit. | |
| 14 | Turkey | Ankara | 29–30 November | Official visit. | |
| 14 | United Arab Emirates | Dubai | 30 November–3 December | Attended the opening ceremony of the World Climate Action Summit as part of COP28. Co-chaired the event "Mobilizing Finance for Vietnam's Climate Change Commitments" with the Global CEO of Standard Chartered. | |
| 15 | Japan | Tokyo | 16–18 December | Working visit. Attended the ASEAN–Japan Commemorative Summit marking the 50th anniversary of ASEAN–Japan relations and conducted bilateral activities in Japan. | |

== 2024 ==
| # | Country | Location | Date | Notes | Image |
|---|---|---|---|---|---|
| 16 | Switzerland | Davos | 16–18 January | Working visit. Attended the 54th World Economic Forum Annual Meeting. | |
| 16 | Hungary | Budapest | 18–20 January | Official visit. | |
| 16 | Romania | Bucharest | 20–22 January | Official visit. | |
| 17 | Australia | Canberra | 7–9 March | Official visit. The two sides jointly announced the elevation of bilateral relations to a Comprehensive Strategic Partnership. | |
| 17 | New Zealand | Wellington | 10–11 March | Official visit. | |
| 18 | China | Dalian | 24–27 June | Working visit. Attended the 15th Annual Meeting of the New Champions of the World Economic Forum. Held talks and meetings with senior Chinese leaders, worked with several major Chinese economic organisations and corporations, and met with staff members of Vietnamese representative offices in China. | |
| 18 | South Korea | Seoul | 30 June–3 July | Official visit. Met with Prime Minister Han Duck-soo, President Yoon Suk Yeol, and Speaker of the National Assembly Woo Won-shik. | |
| 19 | India | New Delhi | 30 July–1 August | State visit. This was the first visit to India by a Vietnamese Prime Minister in ten years and the first prime ministerial-level visit between the two countries since they elevated their relations to a Comprehensive Strategic Partnership. During the visit, the two sides adopted an Action Programme for implementing the Comprehensive Strategic Partnership for 2024–2028, exchanged a diplomatic note concerning Vietnam's accession to the Coalition for Disaster Resilient Infrastructure, and inaugurated the Military Software Park in Nha Trang. | |
| 20 | Laos | Vientiane | 8–11 October | Working visit. Attended the 44th and 45th ASEAN Summits and related meetings. Met with Filipino President Bongbong Marcos. | |
| 21 | Russia | Kazan | 22–24 October | Attended the 16th BRICS summit. | |
| 22 | United Arab Emirates | Abu Dhabi | 27–29 October | Official visit. | |
| 22 | Saudi Arabia | Riyadh | 29–30 October | Official visit. Attended the 8th Future Investment Initiative. | |
| 22 | Qatar | Doha | 30 October–1 November | Official visit. This was the first visit by a Vietnamese Prime Minister to Qatar in 15 years. | |
| 23 | China | Yunnan, Chongqing | 5–8 November | Working visit. Attended the 8th Greater Mekong Subregion Summit, the 10th Ayeyawady–Chao Phraya–Mekong Economic Cooperation Strategy Summit, and the 11th Cambodia–Laos–Myanmar–Vietnam Summit. | |
| 24 | Brazil | Rio de Janeiro | 16–19 November | Working visit. Attended the G20 Summit. | |
| 24 | Dominican Republic | Santo Domingo | 19–21 November | Official visit. This was the first visit by a Vietnamese leader to the Dominican Republic since the two countries established diplomatic relations in 2005. | |

== 2025 ==
| # | Country | Location | Date | Details | Image |
|---|---|---|---|---|---|
| 25 | Laos | Vientiane | 9–10 January | Working visit. Co-chaired the 47th meeting of the Vietnam–Laos Intergovernmental Committee. | |
| 26 | Poland | Warsaw | 15–18 January | Official visit. Held talks with Prime Minister Donald Tusk and met with other senior officials. Following the talks, Vietnam decided to grant short-term visa exemptions to Polish citizens, while Poland affirmed that it would soon ratify the Vietnam–EU Investment Protection Agreement (EVIPA). | |
| 26 | Czech Republic | Prague | 18–20 January | Official visit. This was the first official visit by a Vietnamese Prime Minister to the Czech Republic in six years. | |
| 26 | Switzerland | Davos | 20–23 January | Working visit. Attended the 55th Annual Meeting of the World Economic Forum (WEF Davos 55). | |
| 27 | Malaysia | Kuala Lumpur | 25–27 May | Prime Minister Chinh attended the 46th ASEAN Summit at the Kuala Lumpur Convention Centre on 26–27 May. | |
| 28 | Estonia | Tallinn | 5–7 June | Official visit. This was the first visit by a Vietnamese Prime Minister to Estonia since the two countries established diplomatic relations in 1992. | |
| 28 | France | Nice | 7–11 June | Working visit. Attended the third United Nations Ocean Conference and related bilateral activities in France. | |
| 28 | Sweden | Stockholm | 12–14 June | Official visit. This was the first visit by a Vietnamese Prime Minister to Sweden in six years. | |
| 29 | China | Tianjin | 24 June | Working visit. Attended the World Economic Forum. | |
| 30 | Brazil | Rio de Janeiro | 6–7 July | Attended the 17th BRICS summit. | |
| 31 | China | Tianjin | 31 August | Met with President Xi Jinping. Attended the 2025 Shanghai Cooperation Organisation summit. | |
| 32 | Malaysia | Kuala Lumpur | 25–28 October | Attended the 47th ASEAN Summit and related summits at the Kuala Lumpur Convention Centre. | |
| 33 | Kuwait | Kuwait City | 16–18 November | Official visit. This was the first visit by a Vietnamese Prime Minister to Kuwait in 16 years. | |
| 33 | Algeria | Algiers | 18–20 November | Official visit. Attended the Vietnam–Algeria Economic Forum and related meetings, and met with President Abdelmadjid Tebboune, Algerian Prime Minister Sifi Ghrieb, and other senior leaders. The two sides also adopted a joint statement upgrading bilateral relations to a strategic partnership. | |
| 33 | South Africa | Johannesburg | 21–24 November | Working visit. Attended the G20 Summit. | |
| 34 | Laos | Vientiane | 2–3 December | Working visit. Attended the meeting between the Politburos of Vietnam and Laos and co-chaired the 48th meeting of the Vietnam–Laos Intergovernmental Committee. | |

== 2026 ==
| # | Country | Location | Date | Details | Image |
|---|---|---|---|---|---|
| 35 | Russia | Moscow | 22–25 March | Met with Russian President Vladimir Putin, Prime Minister Mikhail Mishustin, Federation Council Chairwoman Valentina Matviyenko, State Duma Chairman Vyacheslav Volodin, and Security Council Secretary Sergey Shoigu. Visited and held working sessions at leading Russian economic, scientific research, and educational institutions; attended the Vietnam–Russia Business Forum; and met with leading businesses from the Russian Federation. | |

== Multilateral meetings ==
Chính attended the following summits during his prime ministership:

| Group | Year | | | | |
| Group | 2021 | 2022 | 2023 | 2024 | 2025 |
|---|---|---|---|---|---|
| ASEM | 26 November, (virtual) (Cambodia) Phnom Penh | None | None | None | None |
| BRICS | 9 September, (India) New Delhi | 23 June, (China) Beijing | 22–24 August, (South Africa) Johannesburg | 22–24 October, (Russia) Kazan | 6–7 July, (Brazil) Rio de Janeiro |
| EAS (ASEAN+3) | 26–27 October, (virtual) (Brunei) Bandar Seri Begawan | 10–13 November, (Cambodia) Phnom Penh | 9–11 May, (Indonesia) Labuan Bajo | 8–11 October, (Laos) Vientiane | 26–27 May, (Malaysia) Kuala Lumpur |
| EAS (ASEAN+3) | 26–27 October, (virtual) (Brunei) Bandar Seri Begawan | 10–13 November, (Cambodia) Phnom Penh | 5–7 September, (Indonesia) Jakarta | 8–11 October, (Laos) Vientiane | 26–28 October, (Malaysia) Kuala Lumpur |
| G20 | 30–31 October, (Italy) Rome | 15–16 November, (Indonesia) Bali | 9–10 September, (India) New Delhi | 16–19 November, (Brazil) Rio de Janeiro | 22–23 November, (South Africa) Johannesburg |
| G7 | 11–13 June, (United Kingdom) Cornwall | 26–28 June, (Germany) Krün | 19–21 May, (Japan) Hiroshima | 13–15 June, (Italy) Fasano | 16–17 June, (Canada) Kananaskis |
██ = Did not attend

== See also ==
- List of international prime ministerial trips made by Lê Minh Hưng, Chính's successor
