= 2026 in North Korea =

- Centuries: 20th; 21st
- Decades: 2000s; 2010s; 2020s
- See also: Other events of 2026; Years in North Korea; Timeline of Korean history 2026 in South Korea

The following is a list of events from the year 2026 in North Korea.

== Incumbents ==
Photo	Position	Name
	General Secretary of the Workers' Party of Korea	Kim Jong Un
	Premier of North Korea	Pak Thae-Song
	Chairman of the Standing Committee of the Supreme People's Assembly	Choe Ryong-hae

== Events ==
=== January ===
- 4 January – North Korea carries out a ballistic missile test over the Sea of Japan.
- 20 January – Kim Jong-un dismisses Yang Sung-ho as vice premier in charge of machinery after publicly accusing him of incompetence.
- 26 January – The Tokyo District Court in Japan orders North Korea to pay 88 million yen ($570,000) in compensation to four Zainichi Koreans who were lured to move to the country through propaganda schemes but instead experienced inappropriate conditions before escaping.
- 27 January – North Korea carries out a ballistic missile test over the Sea of Japan.

=== February ===
- 19–25 February – 9th Congress of the Workers' Party of Korea.
- 22 February – 9th Congress of the Workers' Party of Korea: The Workers' Party of Korea reappoints Kim Jong-un as its general secretary.
- 23 February – 9th Congress of the Workers' Party of Korea: The Workers' Party of Korea promotes Kim Yo Jong, the sister of Kim Jong-un, as a full department director of the Party.

=== March ===
- 9 March – General Secretary Kim Jong-un reaffirms North Korea's relations with China in a letter written to General Secretary of the Chinese Communist Party Xi Jinping.
- 12 March – Train services between Beijing and Pyongyang resume after a suspension imposed in 2020 due to the COVID-19 pandemic.
- 14 March – North Korea fires 10 ballistic missiles into the Sea of Japan from a launch site in Sunan.
- 15 March – 2026 North Korean parliamentary election.
- 19 March – North Korea qualifies for the 2027 FIFA Women's World Cup after defeating Chinese Taipei 4–0 during the 2026 AFC Women's Asian Cup playoffs in Australia.
- 22 March – Following the 2026 North Korean parliamentary election, Kim Jong Un is reelected chairman of the State Affairs Commission (head of State) and Pak Thae-song is reappointed as Premier.
- 25 March – Belarusian president Alexander Lukashenko visits Kim Jong-un in Pyongyang.

=== April ===
- 8 April – KCNA says that the country has tested various military technologies throughout the week including a surface-to-surface tactical missile called Hwasongpho-11 Ka.
- 19 April – North Korea carries out a ballistic missile test into the Sea of Japan involving cluster munitions.
- 27 April – A museum and memorial dedicated to the North Korean involvement in the Russo-Ukrainian war (2022–present) is opened in Pyongyang.

=== May ===
- 17 May – Naegohyang Women's FC arrive in South Korea to compete at the AFC Women's Champions League in Suwon, the first time a North Korean sports team has been sent to the South since 2018.
- 20 May – Naegohyang Women's FC defeats South Korean side Suwon FC Women at the semifinals of the AFC Women's Champions League in Suwon.
- 23 May – Naegohyang Women's FC wins the 2025–26 AFC Women's Champions League after defeating Tokyo Verdy Beleza 1–0 at the final in South Korea.
- 25 May – North Korea launches several close-range ballistic missiles at Yellow Sea.

=== June ===
- 8 June – Xi Jinping, the General Secretary of the Chinese Communist Party, visits North Korea and meets with General Secretary Kim Jong Un after seven years.

=== August ===
- 6 August – North Korea launches a short-range ballistic missile into the Sea of Japan.
- 12 August – North Korea fires a missile from Wonsan into the Sea of Japan.

=== September ===
- 8 September – The first road bridge connecting Russia and North Korea is opened over the Tumen River between Rason and Khasan.
- 20 September – North Korea launches an unidentified projectile at the Sea of Japan.
- 23 September – Ukraine announces that two North Korean soldiers that had been captured while fighting for Russia had been transferred to South Korea.

=== October ===
- 3 October – Kim Yo Jong announced an intermediate-range missile test.
- 12 October – North Korea launches multiple ballistic missiles from the vicinity of Pyongyang.
- 14 October – The New Yalu River Bridge connecting North Korea and China is inaugurated between Sinuiju and Dandong across the Yalu River.
- 30 October – TRM Labs, an American blockchain analysis firm reveals that North Korea's Bureau 121 was responsible for a $6.3 billion theft on cryptocurrency exchange Binance, the largest heist in history, prompting an investigation by the FBI and the US Secret Service.

=== November ===
- 6 November – The US cuts off money exchanger MEXC due to transactions involving North Korea.
- 13 November – The FBI announces that North Korea used fake video calls to steal $400 million.

== Holidays ==
- 1 January – New Year's Day
- 8 February – Korean People's Army Foundation Day
- 16 February – Birthday of Kim Jong-Il
- 17 February – Seollal
- 3 March – Daeboreum
- 8 March – International Women's Day
- 4 April – Chungmyung Day
- 15 April – Birthday of Kim Il-sung
- 25 April – Chosun People's Army Foundation Day
- 1 May – Labour Day
- 6 June – Chosun Children's Union Foundation Day
- 27 July – Day of Victory in the Great Fatherland Liberation War
- 15 August – Liberation Day
- 25 August – Day of Songun
- 9 September – National Day
- 25 September – Hangawi
- 10 October – Party Foundation Day
- 16 November – Mother's Day
- 27 December – Constitution Day

== Deaths ==
- 20 January – Li Chang-Su, 58, judoka and defector to South Korea.
- 29 March – Chang Ung, 87, basketball player (national team) and sports administrator, president of ITF (2002–2015) and member of the IOC (1996–2018).
- 23 July – Kim Jong-im, 90–91, politician. (death announced on this date)
- 15 September – Yun Tong-hyon, general and politician. (death announced on this date)
