= Lee Moon-soo =

South Korean actor (1949–2025)

Lee Moon-soo (Korean:이문수; March 3, 1949 – November 28, 2025) was a South Korean actor.

== Career ==
Throughout his career, he acted in a number of Korean films, including My Son (2007), Good Morning President (2009), Late Blossom (2011).

In 2010, he was awarded the Minister of Culture, Sports and Tourism Commendation.

He died November 28, 2025, aged 76.
