= National Hangeul Museum =

Linguistics museum in Seoul, South Korea

- Established: 2014
- Location: Yongsan District, Seoul, South Korea
- Coordinates: 37.521174°N 126.980938°E
- Website: www.hangeul.go.kr/lang/en/

- National Hangeul Museum
- Hangul: 국립한글박물관
- Hanja: 國立한글博物館
- RR: Gungnip hangeul bangmulgwan
- MR: Kungnip han'gŭl pangmulgwan

The National Hangeul Museum (Korean: 국립한글박물관) was established in 2014 in the Yongsan District of Seoul (South Korea) near the National Museum of Korea. Occupying over 11,322 square metres (121,870 sq ft), it showcases the cultural and political context, linguistic structure and evolution of the Korean alphabetical character system known as Hangul (Hangeul) through exhibitions, research activities, and education.

== Fire ==
The museum was damaged in a fire on 1 February 2025 that affected its third and fourth floors and injured one firefighter. At the time of the incident, the museum was closed due to expansion works. No damage was recorded to the museum's collection, which had mostly been transferred elsewhere. The remaining artefacts were transferred to the National Museum of Korea for safekeeping following the fire. The fire, which was believed to have originated from a spark near a steel staircase, destroyed a Hangeul-themed playground for children and a hallway section and damaged a special exhibition hall. In September 2025, the museum announced that it would reopen in October 2028 following renovations.

== Exhibitions ==
The museum has a basement level with an auditorium and three ground levels with lecture rooms, a library, a permanent exhibition hall, a special exhibition hall as well as a Hangeul Learning Center and a Children's Museum with a Hangeul playground.

There is plenty of text in English for non-Korean speakers, along with interactive games and audio-visual displays highlighting elements of Hangeul and providing basic reading and writing skills.

The museum currently contains around 80,000 artefacts.

== Literature ==
- Ottar Grepstad: Language Museums of the World. Centre for Norwegian Language and Literature, Ørsta 2018, ISBN 978-82-92602-25-6

== Gallery ==
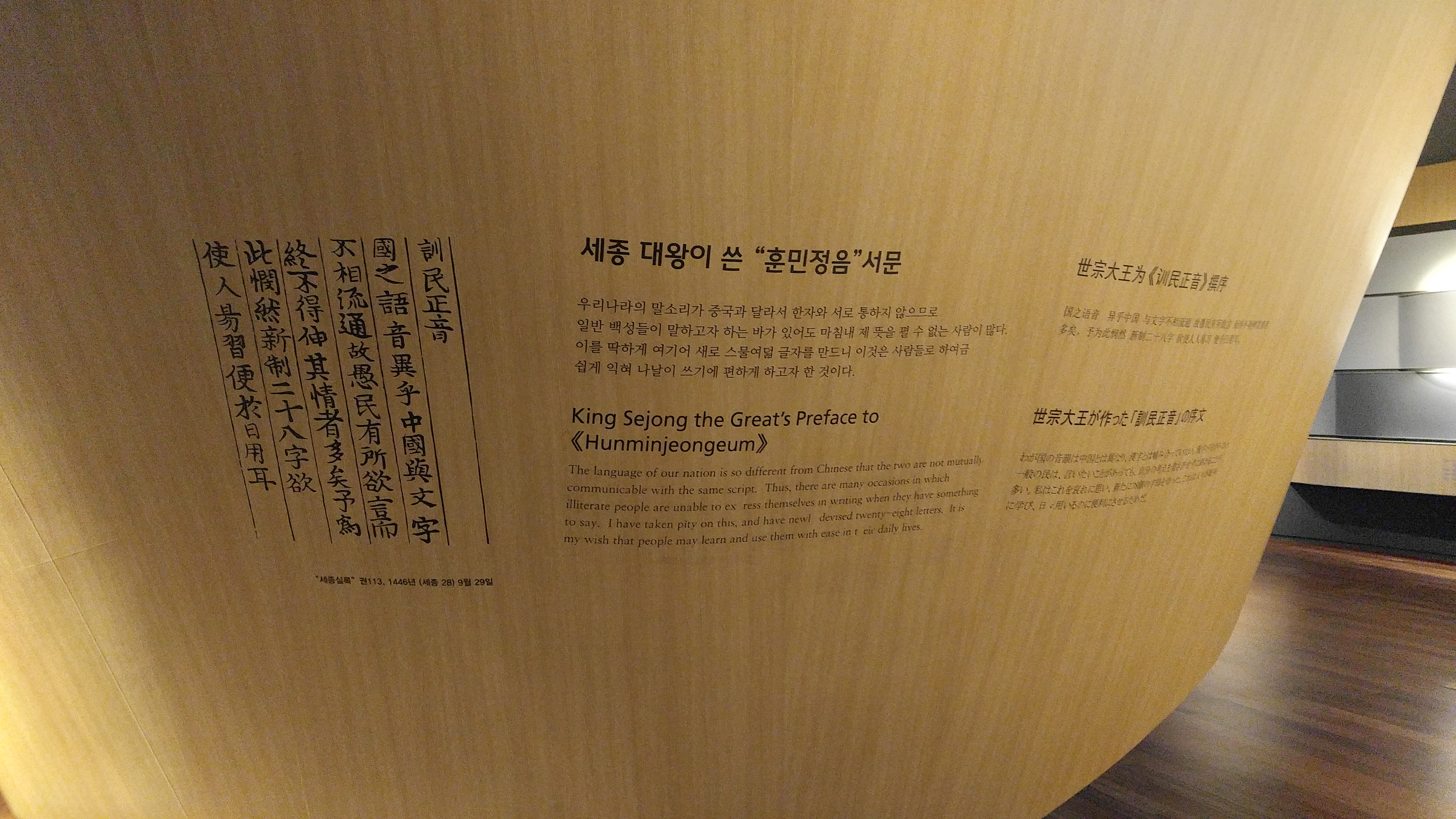

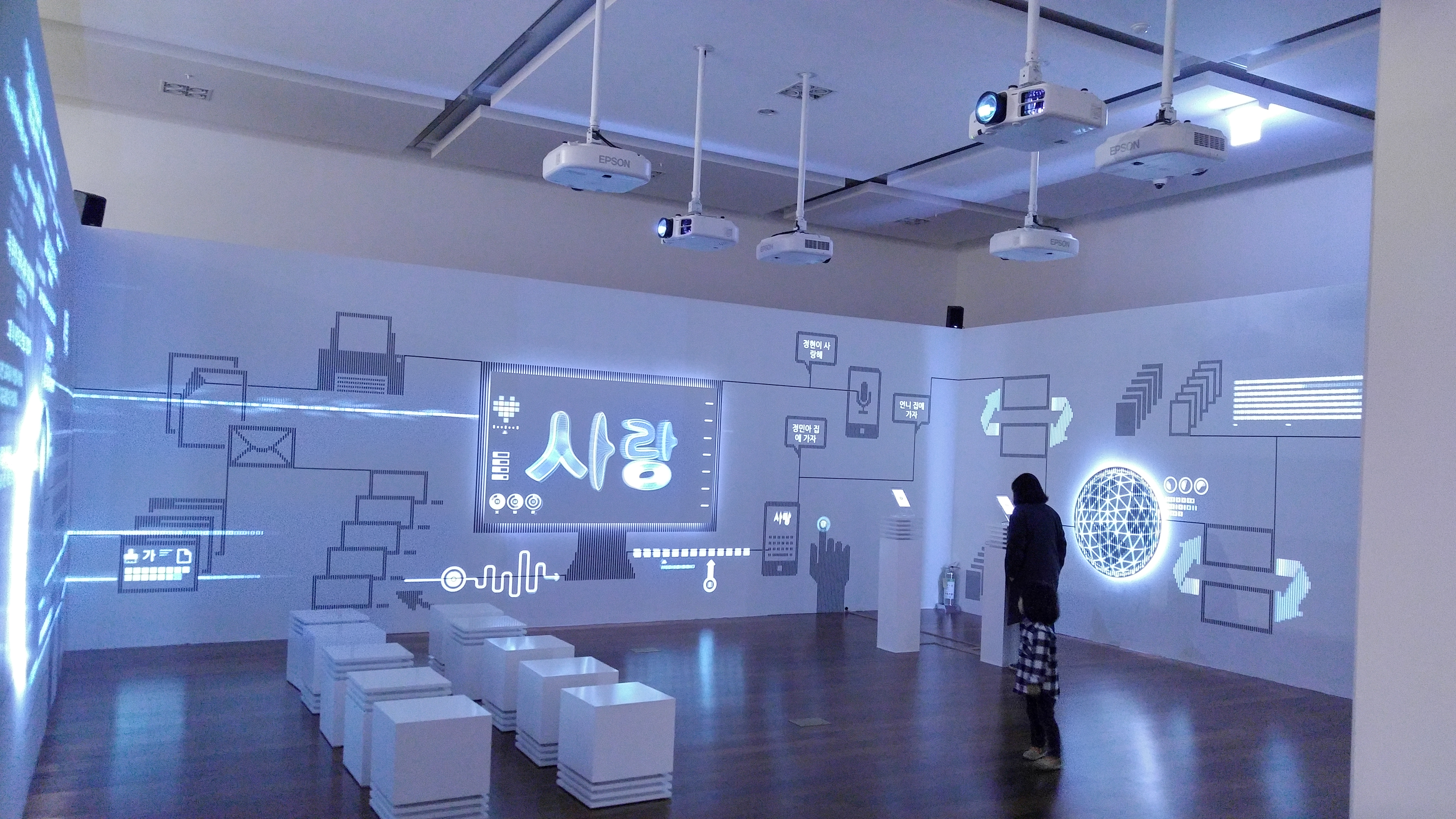

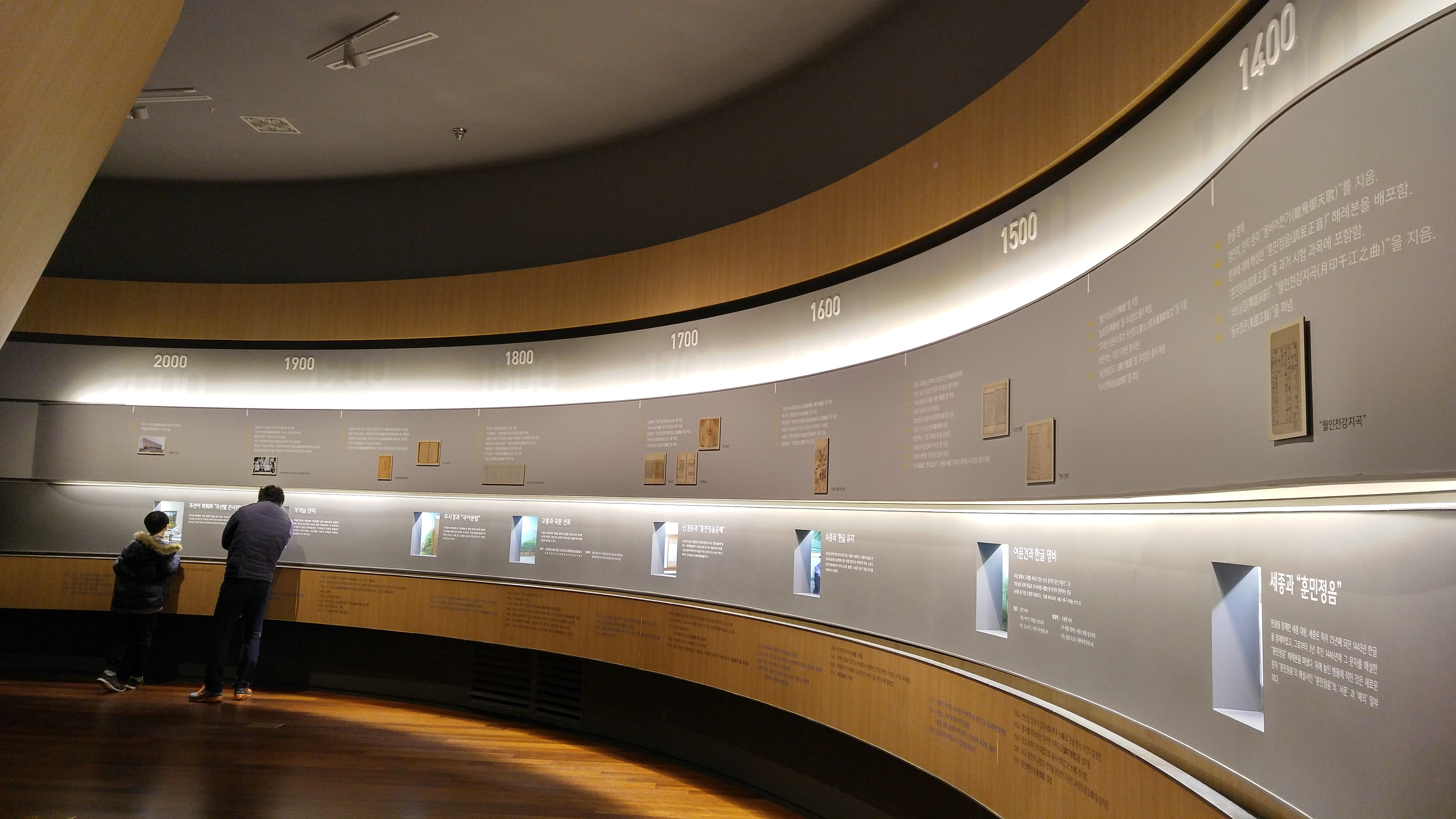

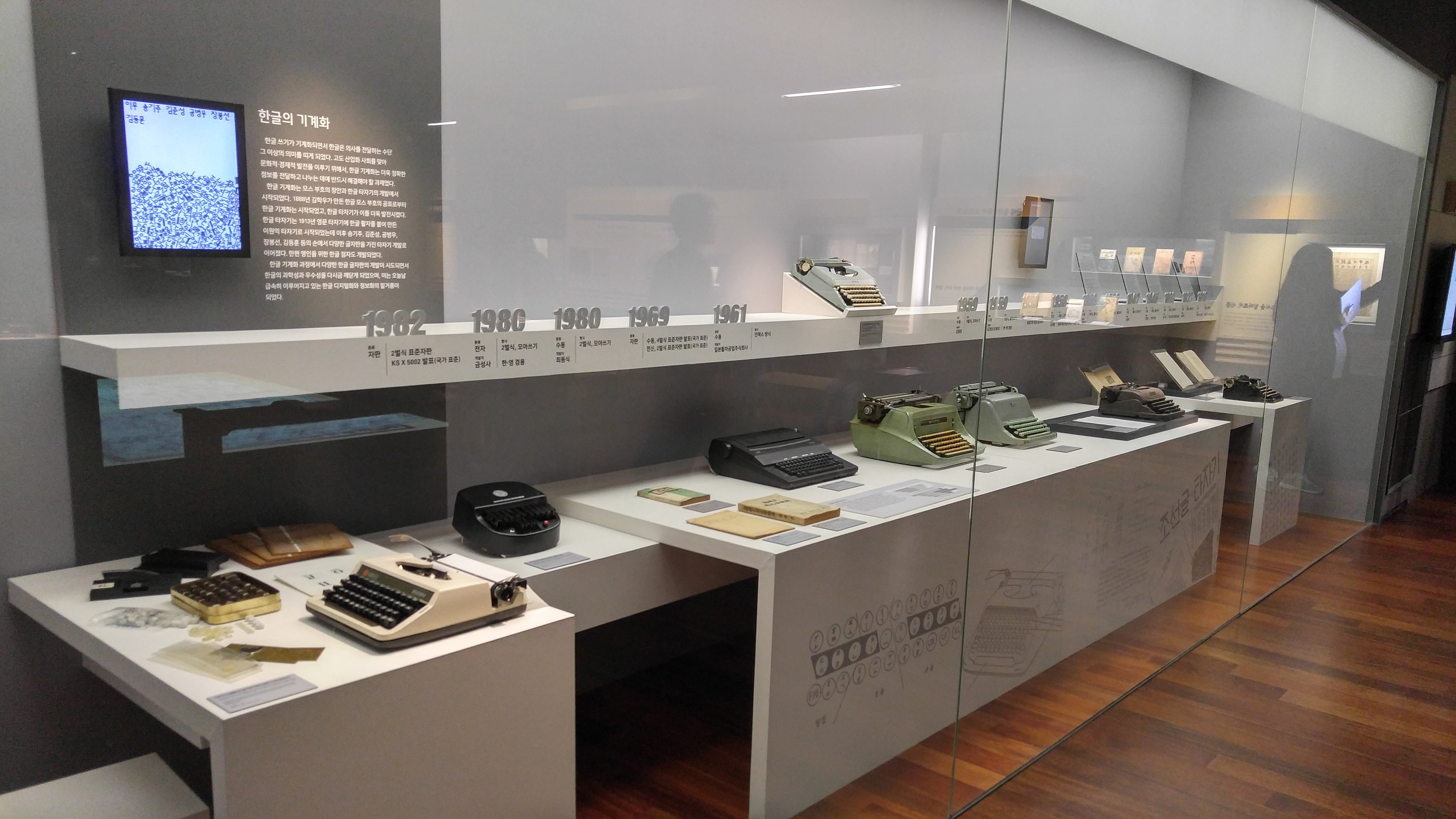
