= Death of Jeong-In =

Child abuse case in Seoul, South Korea

Jeong-In (Korean: 정인, June 10, 2019 – October 13, 2020) was a 16-month-old baby girl from Seoul, South Korea, who was abused and tortured by her adoptive parents for 271 days (8 months), and ultimately died on October 13, 2020, due to severe abdominal injuries. Her adoptive full name was Ahn Yul-Ha (안율하).

Her adoptive mother, Jang Hayeong, was charged with murder and child abuse. Her adoptive father, Ahn Sungeun, was only charged with child abuse and neglect, as he claimed he was unaware of the abusive acts of his wife. On May 14, 2021, Jang was sentenced to life imprisonment, while Ahn was sentenced to 5 years imprisonment. The death of Jeong-In sparked national outrage and international awareness. Much of the outrage was also focused on the perceived failure of the police to press charges against her adoptive parents, even though three suspicious child abuse reports were filed by Jeong-In's day-care teachers, a family friend, and a pediatrician. The pediatrician had examined Jeong-In and found multiple bruises on her body, and such a significant weight loss that it was perceived as evidence of abuse and malnutrition. Workers from Holt International Children's Services also failed in follow-ups after the abuse was reported to them.

On October 13, 2020, Jeong-In was brought to the hospital by her adoptive mother by taxi and died a few hours after due to cardiac arrest. The CT scan and autopsy revealed that her abdomen was full of blood (80% of her blood), that she had multiple bone fractures in her collarbone, ribs, and arms, with some of the bones having been broken again after self-healing 2–4 months prior, and that she had suffered countless bruises on her face, neck, ears, and legs. The cause of death was ruled as amputation of her pancreas and traumatic damage to her internal organs, including severe intestinal rupture caused by heavy external forces. The forensic doctor testified in the 4th trial that he suspected that there was at least another fatal beating around three to five days before Jeong-In died, which fell on a public holiday in South Korea, indicating that both adoptive parents were at home.

On January 2, 2021, an episode of the investigative show Unanswered Questions (Korean: 그것이 알고 싶다) analyzed what may have happened to Jeong-In, and was aired by the South Korean broadcaster SBS; the show went viral and sparked national outrage in South Korea. Thousands of protesters and children's rights activists demanded the government reform laws to better protect children from abuse and implement the maximum penalty for the adoptive parents Jang and Ahn. The #SorryJeongIn online campaign was also created to raise awareness of child abuse, especially that of Jeong-In's case. On November 26, Jang's sentence was commuted to 35 years in prison. Both the adoptive parents and the prosecution appealed, and on April 28, 2022, an appeal trial was held, and the Supreme Court upheld both the lower courts for the adoptive mother (35 years in prison) and the adoptive father (5 years in prison).

== Birth ==
Jeong-In was born on June 10, 2019, at full-term and as a healthy baby weighed 3.43 kg (7 lb 9 oz). Her birth mother was incapable of taking care of her and therefore gave her up to a church when Jeong-In was just 8 days old. Jeong-In then spent 8 months in a foster home until she was adopted. According to her foster mom, Jeong-In was a very happy and cheerful baby, who loved music and always smiled.

== Adoptive parents ==
- Adoptive Mother – Jang Hayeong (born November 4, 1986) attended Handong Global University. Her father, Jang Young-Gil, is a pastor in Yangdeok Pohang Disciples Church, while her mother, Jang Eunhee, owns the Big Circle Daycare Center, which belongs to Pu Gang Disciples Church.
- Adoptive Father – Ahn Sungeun (born June 18, 1984) attended Handong Global University and worked at CBS. His father, Ahn Hee-Gil, is also a pastor in Andong Baptist Church, Gyeonbuk.

== Adoption process ==
In August 2019, Jeong-In was matched with Jang and Ahn after they applied to adopt a baby girl. Jang and Ahn had a 4-year-old biological daughter and said that they wanted a baby sister for their daughter. They passed the adoption screening process, including the psychological test. Jeong-In moved in with them in February 2020. She weighed 8.5 kg (19 lb) when she was officially adopted by Jang and Ahn.

== Abuse ==
While in the same household with Jang Hayeong and Ahn Sungeun for 8 months, Jeong-In was systematically abused and tortured in many brutal ways, including being regularly beaten, which caused multiple bone fractures, and starvation because they didn't like the smell of her feces. She was served hot food right after it was taken out from the microwave, which caused blisters and wounds in the mouth. Her adoptive parents left her alone at home for over three hours a day, for a minimum of fifteen times, during the two months she was absent from daycare (July to September 2020). She was locked in a dark room every day after 7 p.m. Jang and Ahn slapped her and tore at her mouth when she was crying. They overturned her stroller whilst she was inside it to scare her when she was crying. They deliberately tripped her while she was walking, and then laughed. They also left her alone alongside the swimming pool for a whole day without a guardian and hung her up by her arms to hit her armpit area, as it was a very sensitive area, and would cause tremendous pain.

== Dismissal of police reports ==
Two months after the adoption, the daycare teachers started to observe unusual bruises on Jeong-In's face and ears. When they found more bruises on her thighs, abdomen, neck, and collar bone fractures, the teachers reported a suspected child abuse case to the police on May 25, 2020. The police and the child protection institution started to investigate but closed the case with the conclusion that no apparent abuse founded.

On June 29, 2020, a family friend of Jang's saw Jeong-In was left alone in Jang's car for over an hour on a hot summer day and reported it to the police. The investigation was not initiated by the police until one month later and therefore all CCTV footage from the street had been erased, so the case was closed again.

Jeong-In was absent from her day-care for 2 months from July 2020 to September 2020, but when she returned to the day-care in September, the teachers were shocked to see her condition. Jeong-In had lost a significant amount of weight and was covered in bruises all over her body. The teachers immediately took her to a clinic where the pediatrician examined Jeong-In and reported to the police that Jeong-In was suffering from malnutrition and obvious child abuse. The pediatrician strongly advised the police to immediately separate Jeong-In from her parents. However, the police and child protection institution took Jeong-In to another clinic where her adoptive parents had a relationship with the doctor and as such, the doctor diagnosed Jeong-In with a mouth infection, hence the case was closed again and Jeong-In was sent back home to her abusive parents. 20 days after the third case was closed, Jeong-In died.

== Death ==
On October 12, 2020, Jeong-In was sent to daycare in serious condition. According to the daycare teachers, she couldn't walk, stand, drink or eat all day. Her stomach seemed swollen, but she didn't fuss or cry at all. Her diaper was also dry for hours without any urine passing. The teachers called her adoptive mother, and she came to check Jeong-In's condition for a few minutes, but then left saying there was nothing to worry about.

However, Jeong-In had no energy and seemed very weak. After being dehydrated, she took a few sips of milk that the teacher tried to give her, but she immediately panted after drinking the liquid, and her body began to shiver. When her adoptive father picked her up in the afternoon, the teacher expressed her concern about Jeong-In's health, and how she didn't walk all day; at that moment, her adoptive father forced Jeong-In to take a few steps towards him, trying to prove that she was fine. The teachers asked the adoptive father to take Jeong-In to the hospital immediately, but he decided not to.

The next day on October 13, 2020, Jeong-In's adoptive mother recorded with her phone to force Jeong-In to walk between 8:46 a.m. and 9:01 a.m. In the video, Jeong-In seemed to be in severe pain, constantly crying, but her adoptive mother was yelling and screaming at Jeong-In, demanding that she walk. At around 9:40 a.m., the neighbors downstairs heard some extremely loud noises from above, as if dumbbells were falling on the ground about 4-5 times. The neighbor went upstairs to check if everything was fine, but only Jang answered the door while her biological daughter peeked out. Jang apologized for the noise and said everything was all right. Then Jang called the daycare, stating that Jeong-In would be absent from daycare on that day. Around 10:19 a.m., she took her biological daughter to the daycare, and then to a lingerie store on the way home. In the surveillance footage, Jeong-In was not with her adoptive mother, and so she was alone at home again. Once returning home, Jang finally called a taxi to take Jeong-In to the hospital. The taxi driver saw that Jeong-In was turning blue and unconscious, so he asked Jang to call the ambulance instead, but she refused. After several rounds of cardiac arrest and resuscitation in the ER, Jeong-In died on October 13, 2020, at the age of 16 months. While Jeong-In was fighting for her life in the ER, her adoptive mother was perusing online shopping malls and looking for a fishcake to buy outside of the emergency room.

== Autopsy ==
During the trial, the autopsy was performed, and the doctor testified that Jeong-In's case was the worst child abuse case he had ever seen in his 20 years of experience. Out of the 3,800 bodies he’d examined, from a pediatric perspective, Jeong-In had the worst injuries and her entire body was severely damaged. He had never seen a ruptured pancreas in a pediatric case, and he concluded that Jeong-In was probably stomped on multiple times on her stomach by adults. Only extremely strong force applied to her abdomen would cause such rupture of her internal organs. Additionally, based on some recovered tissue found in Jeong-In's organs, the doctors also believed that there was another severe beating that happened 3–5 days prior to her death. Jeong-In spent the last few days of her life in extreme pain, with even breathing being painful, which explained why she did not cry in the daycare where she was last seen alive.

== See also ==
- Murder of Kim Ha-neul
