= Presidential Bio Committee =

South Korean presidential advisory committee

- 국가바이오위원회

Agency overview
- Formed: 23 January 2025
- Agency executives: Lee Jae-myung, Chairman; Lee Sang-yup, Vice Chairman

The Presidential Bio Committee (Korean: 국가바이오위원회) is a presidential advisory committee of South Korea that oversees national strategies on biotechnology and its industry. It was launched in January 2025.

== History ==
In April 2024, the government announced the Advanced Bio Initiative. The advanced bio field is one of the three game-changing technologies named by the Yoon Suk Yeol government, and these three technologies include artificial intelligence, semiconductors, and quantum technology. The main content is to foster digital bio by combining existing innovation-based technologies with high-quality data and to foster bio-based materials and manufacturing industries.

"I will ensure that our country becomes a global leader in bio by 2035."

— Lee Jong-ho, Minister of Science and ICT

Park Sang-wook, Senior Secretary to the President for Science and Technology, explained the background of the establishment, saying, "The bio sector has been criticized for having fragmented governance because the Ministry of Science and ICT, the Ministry of Health and Welfare, and the Ministry of Trade, Industry and Energy have each handled policies and Research and development."

It was scheduled to be launched in December 2024, but it was officially launched on January 23, 2025, a month later, at the launch ceremony held at the Seoul Bio Hub, presided over by Acting President Choi Sang-mok.

"Biotechnology must be nurtured as a new economic driving force."

— Acting President Choi

At the launching ceremony, Acting President Choi said, "The Presidential Bio Committee, which was launched as the highest level of governance across all ministries, will organically connect policies that are being individually promoted by related organizations and consolidate public-private capabilities in all areas of bio, including health and medical care, food, resources, energy, and the environment."

Regarding the launch, the Korea Pharmaceutical and Bio-Pharma Manufacturers Association expressed expectations, saying, "As fierce competition for the bio market is taking place among countries and attention is increasing as a future food source, the launch of an organization directly under the president to oversee the entire bio sector will allow the nation to focus its efforts," but urged that it be operated independently with specific goals. They also requested a proper division of roles with the existing Biohealth Innovation Committee.

== Role ==

Samsung Biologics and Celltrion are among the top 10 companies in South Korea by market capitalization.

In January 2025, the joint inter-ministerial Bio-Great Transformation Strategy (Korean: 대한민국 바이오 대전환 전략) was announced. It included the establishment of a Korean-style bio cluster, and the main content was to functionally connect approximately 20 bio clusters scattered across the country and establish an infrastructure sharing system, thereby establishing a more efficient collaboration system and creating 10,000 new jobs. A cluster council was formed under the committee.

This will strengthen the functions of public Contract Research Organization and Contract manufacturing organization specializing in clinical trials and production processes in the red bio field, focus on developing domestic raw materials and materials for green bio and securing synthetic biology technology, and support the use of eco-friendly materials for white bio and blue bio, and high value-added marine biological resources, respectively.

Another key role is to constantly discover and improve existing regulatory innovation agencies and industry regulations, and to reduce uncertainty by establishing a regulatory science and regulatory innovation roadmap. In addition, it is responsible for strengthening multidisciplinary education to foster key personnel specialized in each field such as artificial intelligence new drug development, digital healthcare, synthetic biology, and agricultural and food bio, fostering doctors and scientists, and attracting overseas scholars and researchers.

By 2027, it will foster 110,000 industrial talents in the biohealth field, establish separate talent development strategies for green and white bio fields, and promote specialized education in fields such as AI new drug development, foster medical scientists, and expand the attraction of overseas scholars and overseas dispatch of domestic researchers.

The committee also established a data collaboration system centered around the committee for data-based bio R&D.

It plays a role in supporting product development by utilizing the already established public CDMO for domestic bio companies that have the technology but do not have production facilities. It also has a role in supporting companies in the CDMO field, where the country already has strengths, to become the world's number one in terms of production and sales by expanding production capacity by 2.5 times the current level by 2032. In addition, it also supports expanding the self-sufficiency rate of materials, parts, and equipment.

== Structure ==
The committee has 24 civilian members, including Vice-chair Professor Lee Sang-yup of the KAIST, and 12 ex officio government members, including the ministers of bio-related ministries and the Senior Secretary to the President for Science and Technology.

== See also ==
- Samsung Biologics
- Contract manufacturing organization
