= 2026 Daejeon factory fire =

Fire in Daejeon, South Korea

- Date: 20 March 2026
- Time: 1:17 p.m. (KST)
- Location: Daejeon, South Korea
- Deaths: 14
- Injuries: 60

On 20 March 2026, at 13:17 KST, a fire broke out at a car parts factory in Daedeok District, Daejeon, South Korea, killing 14 people and injuring 60 others.

== Background ==
The factory was operated by Anjun Industrial, a manufacturer of engine valves supplying major automakers including Hyundai and Kia. The company employed around 350 workers, with approximately 170 people reported to be inside the building at the time of the fire. The three-storey facility stored hazardous materials, including around 200 kg (440 lb) of sodium, a highly reactive substance that can explode when exposed to water.

== Fire ==
The fire began on the first floor of the factory at approximately 13:17 KST. and rapidly spread to the upper floors. Witnesses reported hearing an explosion prior to the blaze, although the exact cause remained under investigation. Video footage from the scene showed thick black smoke rising from the building, while some workers attempted to escape by jumping from windows. According to fire officials, the fire spread so quickly that many workers were forced to evacuate before emergency responders arrived. Firefighting efforts were complicated by the presence of sodium, delaying the use of water until the material could be safely removed. More than 500 firefighters, police officers, and emergency personnel were deployed, along with firefighting helicopters and unmanned robots used to access dangerous areas and cool the structure. The fire was brought under control late on 20 March and fully extinguished the following day.

== Casualties ==
Fourteen people were confirmed dead in the fire, with all initially reported missing individuals later accounted for. Many of the victims were discovered on the upper floors, including nine in a third-floor space used as a gym locker room. Some victims were severely burned, requiring DNA testing for identification. Injuries totaled 60, including both serious and minor cases, with causes including smoke inhalation and injuries sustained while escaping the building.

== Response ==
Emergency services conducted extensive search and rescue operations, including the use of search dogs to locate missing victims. Firefighters faced ongoing risks from potential structural collapse during the operation. South Korean President Lee Jae Myung visited the site on 21 March, where he was briefed on the situation and met with victims' families. He called for improved workplace safety measures and ordered officials to ensure thorough investigation and communication with the bereaved families. The government activated a centralized disaster response system and mobilized national resources to manage the incident.

== Aftermath ==
Anjun Industrial's CEO, Sohn Ju-hwan, issued a public apology and pledged full cooperation with authorities, including a review of safety procedures and implementation of measures to prevent similar incidents. Authorities in Daejeon announced plans to establish a joint memorial altar for the victims at City Hall following requests from bereaved families. The incident was the deadliest factory fire in South Korea since a 2024 lithium battery plant fire in Hwaseong that killed 23 workers.
