= Comprehensive strategic partnership =

Comprehensive strategic partnership is a type of strategic partnership used by some countries, and may refer to:

- Comprehensive strategic partnerships of Vietnam, a diplomatic designation used by the Vietnamese government for certain bilateral relationships
- Comprehensive strategic partnerships, a form of China’s diplomatic partnerships
- Iranian–Russian Treaty on Comprehensive Strategic Partnership
- North Korean–Russian Treaty on Comprehensive Strategic Partnership
