= 2025 in North Korea =

- Centuries: 20th; 21st
- Decades: 2000s; 2010s; 2020s
- See also: Other events of 2025; Years in North Korea; Timeline of Korean history 2025 in South Korea

The following is a list of events from the year 2025 in North Korea.

== Incumbents ==
Photo	Position	Name
	General Secretary of the Workers' Party of Korea	Kim Jong Un
	Chairman of the Standing Committee of the Supreme People's Assembly	Choe Ryong-hae
	Premier of North Korea	Pak Thae-Song

== Events ==
=== January ===
- January 6 – According to reports by the South Korean military, North Korea launches an intermediate-range ballistic missile towards the Sea of Japan.
- January 11 – Ukraine announces the capture of two North Korean soldiers during fighting in Russia's Kursk Oblast.
- January 16 – Travel agencies announce the reopening of the border city of Rason and the Rason Special Economic Zone to foreign visitors following a prolonged closure caused by the COVID-19 pandemic.

=== February ===
- February 13 – According to reports by the South Korean Ministry of Unification, North Korea begins the demolition of the Reunion Center for the Separated Families, which hosts reunions of families split by the Korean War, in Mount Kumgang.
- February 27 – The United States formally accuses North Korea of responsibility over the theft of $1.5 billion in virtual assets from the cryptocurrency exchange ByBit, in what is reported to be the biggest such heist in history.
- February 28 – North Korea announces that it had carried out test launches of strategic cruise missiles in the Yellow Sea.

=== March ===
- March 27 – The Korean Central News Agency (KCNA) publishes pictures of what is believed to be North Korea's first airborne early warning and control aircraft.

=== April ===
- April 6 – The Pyongyang Marathon is held for the first time since 2019 following a hiatus caused by the COVID-19 pandemic.
- April 8 – A group of North Korean soldiers enter the South Korean side of the eastern section of the DMZ, prompting warning shots from South Korean forces that force them to retreat.
- April 25 – The Korean People's Navy launches its first destroyer, the Choe Hyon, at a ceremony in Nampo.
- April 28 – North Korea admits to sending its military to fight alongside Russian forces in Kursk Oblast against Ukraine.

=== May ===
- May 8 – North Korea fires several ballistic missiles into the Sea of Japan near Wonsan.
- May 21 – The Korean People's Navy's second destroyer is damaged during its launching ceremony in Chongjin, with Supreme Leader Kim Jong-un in attendance.
- May 22 – North Korea fires several cruise missiles into the Sea of Japan near Sondok, South Hamgyong.

=== June ===
- June 5 – The Korean People's Navy's second destroyer, which was damaged during its initial launching ceremony in Chongjin on May 21, is successfully launched.
- June 7 – A major internet outage is reported in North Korea.
- 11 June – The Republic of Korea Armed Forces suspends loudspeaker broadcasts across the DMZ into North Korea as part of efforts "restore trust" between the two Koreas.
- 25 June – The first train from North Korea arrives at the Yaroslavsky railway station in Moscow, Russia, after a five-year pause due to the COVID-19 pandemic.

=== July ===
- 4 July – A North Korean civilian defects to the South by crossing through the DMZ with the help of the Republic of Korea Armed Forces.
- 7 July – The Kalma resort in Wonsan receives its first group of foreign visitors, with 12 Russian tourists arriving on a week-long organized tour.
- 9 July – South Korea repatriates six North Koreans after their vessels had drifted across their maritime border.
- 13 July – Mount Kumgang is designated as a World Heritage Site by UNESCO.
- 18 July – Foreign tourists are banned from the newly opened Wonsan-Kalma beach resort.
- 27 July – The Russian airline Nordwind launches flights to Pyongyang, marking the first commercial flights between Pyongyang and Moscow in years.

=== August ===
- 4 August – The South Korean military begins removing loudspeakers along the DMZ as part of efforts to reduce tensions with North Korea.
- 19 August – A group of North Korean soldiers enter the South Korean side of the central section of the DMZ, prompting warning shots from South Korean forces that force them to retreat.
- 23 August – Kim Jong Un oversees the test-firing of new air defence missiles which, according to state media KCNA, demonstrate a "fast response" to aerial targets such as attack drones and cruise missiles.

=== September ===
- 2–3 September – Kim Jong Un visits China to attend the 2025 China Victory Day Parade in Beijing.
- 5 September – The New York Times publishes an article alleging that US Navy SEALs carried out an attempted infiltration of North Korea to plant listening devices on Kim Jong-un's communications in 2019 but aborted the mission after encountering a North Korean civilian boat and killing its crew.
- 25 September – North Korea reopens the Sinuiju-Dandong land postal route with China for the first time since the COVID-19 pandemic in 2020.
- 26 September – A North Korean merchant vessel crosses the Northern Limit Line into South Korea, prompting the South Korean military to fire warning shots that forces it to retreat.

=== October ===
- 6 October – The Pyongyang General Hospital is inaugurated in a ceremony led by Kim Jong-un.
- 7–8 October – General Secretary of the Lao People's Revolutionary Party Thongloun Sisoulith makes a state visit to North Korea.
- 9 October – General Secretary of the Communist Party of Vietnam Tô Lâm and Chinese premier Li Qiang make a three-day state visit to North Korea and attend the 80th anniversary of the founding of the Korean Workers' Party.
- 19 October –
  - A North Korean soldier defects to South Korea by crossing the central section of the DMZ.
  - A group of 20 North Korean soldiers briefly cross a section of the DMZ near Paju before retreating following warning shots by South Korean forces.
- 23 October – North Korea carries out a test of two hypersonic missiles fired from Ryokpo-guyok in Pyongyang towards Mount Kwesang in Orang County, North Hamgyong Province.

=== November ===
- 7 November – North Korea test-fires a short-range ballistic missile from a site in Taegwan County, North Pyongan Province.
- 8 November – North Korea wins the 2025 FIFA U-17 Women's World Cup after defeating the Netherlands 3–0 at the final in Rabat, Morocco.
- 13 November – India–North Korea relations: Aliawati Longkumer assumes office as Indian ambassador to North Korea for the first time since the Indian embassy in Pyongyang was closed during the COVID-19 pandemic in 2021.
- 19 November – A group of North Korean soldiers briefly cross a section of the DMZ before retreating following warning shots by South Korean forces.
- 24 November – The Supreme People's Assembly enacts the "city formation and development law".

=== December ===
- 4 December – The South Korean government acknowledges that six of its nationals have been detained in North Korea since the period between 2013 and 2016.
- 23 December – The Samjiyon mountain resort complex in inaugurated.

== Deaths ==
- 24 February – Jeong Su-il, 90, North Korean spy and defector to South Korea.
- 31 March – Kim Shin-jo, 82, North Korean commando (Blue House raid) and defector to South Korea.
- 12 September – Kim Seong-min, 63, North Korean defector to South Korea and political activist.
- 3 November – Kim Yong-nam, 97, president of the Presidium of the Supreme People's Assembly (1998–2019) and minister of foreign affairs (1983–1998).
- 6 December – Aleksandr Matsegora, 70, Russian ambassador to North Korea (since 2014).
- 26 December – Kim Chang-son, 81, deputy (since 2019).
