= 2024 in North Korea =

- Centuries: 20th; 21st
- Decades: 2000s; 2010s; 2020s
- See also: Other events of 2024; Years in North Korea; Timeline of Korean history 2024 in South Korea

The following is a list of events from the year 2024 in North Korea.

== Incumbents ==
Photo	Position	Name
	General Secretary of the Workers' Party of Korea	Kim Jong Un
	Chairman of the Standing Committee of the Supreme People's Assembly	Choe Ryong-hae
	Premier of North Korea	Kim Tok-hun (until 29 December)
	Premier of North Korea	Pak Thae-song (since 29 December)

== Events ==
=== January ===
- January 5 – North Korea fired 200 artillery shells near South Korea's Yeonpyeong Island, prompting evacuations.
- January 15 – North Korean Supreme Leader Kim Jong Un said that Korean reunification was "no longer possible" and asked the Supreme People's Assembly to amend the constitution to formally recognize South Korea as a separate state.
- January 16 – Kim Jong Un declared South Korea as the "primary foe", rejected unification, and called for war planning, severing ties and closing organizations amid escalating tensions.
- January 19 – North Korea announced that it had tested a nuclear weapon delivered by an unmanned underwater drone system in the Sea of Japan.
- January 19-23 – The Arch of Reunification was demolished some time between the said dates, according to satellite imagery.

=== March ===
- March 29 –
  - North Korean state media cited foreign minister Choe Son-hui as said that North Korea rejected any talks with Japan on any issue, including the Japanese abductees, after Japanese Prime Minister Fumio Kishida said he was willing to meet in person with Kim Jong Un.
  - Russia vetoed the continuation of the monitoring of UN sanctions on the North Korean nuclear weapons program.

=== April ===
- April 1 – North Korea fired a ballistic missile into the Sea of Japan near South Korean territory.
- April 23 – North Korea claimed it had tested a new command-and-control system in a simulated nuclear counterstrike.

=== May ===
- 27 May – North Korea announced the failure of an attempt to launch its second spy satellite into orbit after the rocket carrying it explodes mid-air.
- 29 May – North Korea deployed 260 balloons carrying garbage and possible human waste over South Korea, which Pyongyang said that it was in retaliation for balloons sent into the North by anti-regime activists.
- 30 May – North Korea launched a series of short-range ballistic missiles from Sunan-guyok towards the sea near South Korea.

=== June ===
- 4 June – The State Council of South Korea suspended the 2018 Panmunjom Declaration due to border tensions over balloons sent by North Korea.
- 6 June – North Korea received 200,000 anti-Pyongyang leaflets, U.S. bills, and USB sticks containing K-pop songs and South Korean dramas to North Korea with 10 balloons, sent by a South Korean activists’ group led by North Korean defector Park Sang-hak in retaliation for North Korea sending balloons carrying trash to South Korea.
- 9 June – A group of North Korean soldiers entered the South Korean side of the DMZ, prompting warning shots from South Korean forces that force them to retreat.
- 18 June – A group of North Korean soldiers entered the South Korean side of the central section of the DMZ, prompting warning shots from South Korean forces that forced them to retreat.
- 19 June – Russian president Vladimir Putin visited Pyongyang as part of the first visit of a Russian leader to North Korea since 2000, the two signed an agreement to grant mutual aid and support in case either nation faces aggression.
- 20 June – A group of North Korean soldiers entered the South Korean side of the DMZ, prompting warning shots from South Korean forces that force them to retreat.

=== July ===
- 16 July – The South Korean National Intelligence Service announced the defection of North Korean diplomat Ri Il Kyu and his family from his posting in Cuba in November 2023.
- 23 July – Belarusian foreign minister Maxim Ryzhenkov visited Pyongyang.
- 24 July – A balloon from North Korea carrying rubbish landed on the Presidential Residence of South Korea in Yongsan, Seoul.
- 26 July – 11 August 2024: North Korea competed in the 2024 Summer Olympics.
- 31 July – More than 5,000 people in Sinuiju, Uiju and Chagang were reported stranded due to floods that inundated 4,100 houses and 3,000 hectares (7,410 acres) of farmland.

=== August ===
- 1 August – South Korea reported that up to 1,500 people may have been killed by floods in North Korea, caused by the remnants of Typhoon Gaemi.
- 4 August – Kim Jong Un denounced the information declared by South Korea regarding deaths related to flooding as part of a "smear campaign".
- 20 August – A North Korean soldier defected to South Korea by crossing through a section of the DMZ in Goseong County, Gangwon Province.

=== September ===
- 13 September – Sweden redeployed diplomats to its embassy in Pyongyang, making it the first Western country to do so since the COVID-19 pandemic.
- 16 September – North Korea announced that it would revise its constitution on 7 October, with changes including designating South Korea as its primary enemy.
- 22 September – North Korea won the 2024 FIFA U-20 Women's World Cup after defeating Japan 1-0 in the championship final in Bogotá, Colombia. North Korea became the joint most successful side in the tournament's history, with three championship titles that equal Germany and the United States.

=== October ===
- 11 October – North Korea accused South Korea of sending drones carrying propaganda leaflets over Pyongyang on three occasions since 3 October. South Korean officials denied the claims.
- 13 October – Ukrainian president Volodymyr Zelenskyy accused North Korea of sending soldiers to participate in the Russian invasion of Ukraine.
- 15 October – North Korea blew up sections of the Gyeongui and Donghae roads leading to the DMZ.
- 17 October – North Korea revised its constitution to formally designate South Korea as a "hostile" state.
- 24 October – A balloon from North Korea carrying rubbish landed on the Presidential Residence of South Korea in Yongsan, Seoul.
- 31 October – North Korea conducted an ICBM test over the Sea of Japan, with the missile's flight time being confirmed by Japan as the longest held by Pyongyang.

=== November ===
- 4 November – Ukraine announced its first combat engagements with North Korean soldiers in Russia's Kursk Oblast.
- 9 November – South Korea accused North Korea of jamming GPS signals in the Yellow Sea from locations in Haeju and Kaesong, causing disruptions to shipping and aviation.
- 11 November – Kim Jong Un ratified the Comprehensive Strategic Partnership treaty providing strengthened military cooperation with Russia.
- 15 November – Poland announced the reopening of its embassy in Pyongyang, making it the second Western country after Sweden to do so since the COVID-19 pandemic.

=== December ===
- 17 December – Nigeria announced the reopening of its embassy in Pyongyang following a hiatus caused by the COVID-19 pandemic.
- 27 December – The South Korean National Intelligence Service said that a North Korean soldier had been taken prisoner by Ukrainian forces for the first time during the Russo-Ukrainian war in Russia's Kursk Oblast. However, the soldier was reported to have died later in the day from injuries sustained in combat.
- 29 December – Politburo member Pak Thae-song was named Premier of North Korea. On the same day, Kim Jong Un reportedly inspected Kalma Coastal Resort. It was also announced that Kalma Coastal Resort would be open in June 2025. Kim Ju Ae, daughter of Kim Jong Un, accompanied him. However, state media reported it two days later, on 31 December.

== Deaths ==
- 11 January – Kim Kyong-ok, 93, military officer, deputy (1998–2003) and member of the central military commission (2010–2021).
- 20 January – Choe Thae-bok, 93, politician, chairman of the Supreme People's Assembly (1998–2019).
- 7 May – Kim Ki-nam, 94, politician, director of the Propaganda and Agitation Department of the Workers' Party of Korea (1989–2017).
