= Murder of Kim Ha-neul =

2025 child murder in South Korea

- Native name: 대전 초등학생 살해 사건 (transl. Daejeon Elementary School Murder Case)
- Location: Daejeon, South Korea
- Date: 10 February 2025
- Attack type: Murder by multiple stabbing
- Weapon: Knife
- Injuries: 1 (perpetrator; murder–suicide attempt)
- Victim: Kim Ha-neul (김하늘)
- Perpetrator: Myeong Jae-wan (명재완) - Life imprisonment

On 10 February 2025, Kim Ha-neul (Korean: 김하늘), an eight-year-old elementary school student in Daejeon, South Korea, was stabbed to death by one of the teachers from her school. The suspect, Myeong Jae-wan (명재완), who was aged in her 40s, confessed to fatally stabbing Kim, and she was sentenced to life in prison on 20 October 2025.

== Murder ==
On 10 February 2025, a young girl was attacked and murdered inside a school in Daejeon, South Korea.

On the day, police had responded to a report that an eight-year-old girl who attended a school in western Daejeon was missing after she never showed up for her hagwon. After a search, the missing girl was later found inside an audiovisual room with stab wounds on her neck and face, alongside a female teacher in her 40s who also had stab wounds on her body.

Both the teacher and girl were rushed to hospital, but upon her arrival, the eight-year-old girl died. The teacher, who was hospitalised for stab wounds on her neck and arm, was placed under arrest as a suspect behind the girl's death. A police spokesperson also said that the teacher was formerly on a leave of absence due to depression before she returned to her job in late 2024, and it was found that prior to the killing, the suspect had bought a knife at a store near the school during her lunch break and the possible motivations behind the attack was likely due to anger over being banned from teaching.

Before the discovery of the girl, her parents found out that their daughter did not appear to take the bus to her hagwon, despite the teacher of her after-school programme informing them that she had left for it. The bus driver, who did not see the girl, alerted the after-school teacher, who in turn alerted the authorities.

The girl's parents filed a missing persons report at around 5:15pm, and subsequently the police and family members conducted a search in the school and nearby areas. At 5:50pm, the girl's grandmother discovered her inside the audiovisual room, bringing the murder into revelation.

The girl's funeral took place at the Konyang University Hospital's funeral hall, and after the cremation of the girl's remains, her ashes were buried at the Daejeon Memorial Park on 14 February 2025. The victim's parents, relatives, school teachers and many others attended the funeral.

== Investigation ==
The death of the girl, identified as Kim Ha-neul, was classified as murder. A day after the murder, the suspect reportedly confessed to the crime.

Based on first-stage investigations and statement of the Daejeon Education Office, the suspect, who suffered from depression since 2018, requested a six-month leave due to depression on 9 December 2024, but after a doctor found her fit to continue working, she returned to work 20 days later. During her time off, the suspect had lingering suicidal thoughts, according to her testimony to the police. Prior to the stabbing, she had exhibited violent behavior, including putting another teacher in a headlock.

On the morning of the stabbing, two education office officials were investigating the previous altercation. Following the attack, the teacher was recommended for leave and separated from the other teacher, sitting near the vice principal for monitoring. Since her leave in December, she had not taught classes or interacted with the eight-year-old student involved. The suspect claimed that she was "annoyed" about her exclusion from teaching.

Based on the confession of the suspect, she bought a knife on the date of the murder and took it to the school, intending to perpetuate a murder-suicide by killing herself and a child she chose randomly. Kim was reportedly the last student to remain in school after the lessons were over, and hence, the suspect targeted her, luring her into the audiovisual room, lying that she wanted to give the girl a book. Kim was then attacked.

Upon the police's request, the National Forensic Service conducted an autopsy on the girl to determine the cause of death, which was revealed to be multiple sharp force injuries.

The police announced on 11 February that they would request for formal warrants for the arrest of the perpetrator and search of her residence and personal electronic devices, and revealed the possibility of disclosing the suspect's identity. On 19 February, police said that Kim's murder appeared to have been premeditated after a search of a phone and four computers used by the suspects showed that she had looked up murder articles and with information regarding weaponry.

On 7 March, the police began questioning the suspect after she recovered and was assessed by doctors to be fit for questioning. On 12 March, the suspect's photo and personal information was revealed publicly by the Daejeon Metropolitan Police Agency, revealing her full name as Myeong Jae-wan. Myeong reportedly did not object to the public disclosure of her particulars.

== Indictment and trial ==
On 27 March, Myeong Jae-wan was formally indicted by prosecutors of the Daejeon District Prosecutors Office for the murder of Kim Ha-neul. On 31 March, the trial date for Myeong was scheduled for 28 April.

On 26 May, Myeong, who admitted to all the charges, requested a psychiatric evaluation from the court. This move was opposed by the victim's family, who believed that it was an attempt to seek a reduced sentence from the court. On 22 September, the prosecution officially sought the death penalty for Myeong. Under South Korean law, the death penalty was the maximum punishment for murder, although capital punishment is suspended in the country due to an ongoing moratorium on executions since 1998. In their submissions for capital punishment, the prosecution referred to the Act on the Aggravated Punishment of Specific Crimes, under which the offence of murdering a minor under 13 after abduction or enticement is punishable by either life imprisonment or the death penalty, and also cited multiple aggravating factors like the absence of genuine remorse on Myeong's part, and revealed the wish of Kim's family for the harshest punishment possible for the killer. Myeong was reported to make an apology in court for her actions.

On 20 October 2025, Myeong was sentenced to life imprisonment by the Criminal Division of the Daejeon District Court in the first trial. Aside from the life sentence, the court ordered Myeong to wear a tracking device for 30 years. During sentencing, the court acknowledged the seriousness of the crime and therefore inevitably warranted a heavy sentence to isolate Myeong from society permanently. The trial court also noted that Myeong had a high risk of re-offending, but the judges found it difficult to conclude that Myeong should be executed and hence declined to impose the death penalty. At the end of sentencing, Kim's family reportedly expressed their intention to appeal for capital punishment.

== Appeal process ==
On 28 October 2025, Myeong Jae-wan filed an appeal against her life sentence, with the defence citing diminished responsibility as their grounds of appeal for a lighter sentence. Simultaneously, the prosecution appealed for the death penalty in Myeong's case, stating that the sentence was overtly lenient in light of the heinous and brutal nature of Kim Ha-neul's murder.

On 16 January 2026, the Daejeon High Court dismissed the appeals from both the prosecution and defence, and upheld both Myeong's murder conviction and life sentence.

On 2 April 2026, the South Korean Supreme Court confirmed Myeong's life sentence, after finding that there was no error in the lower courts' decision.

Apart from the trial and appeal of Myeong, the Kim family filed the lawsuit seeking damages worth 400 million won against Myeong, the Daejeon Metropolitan Government and the school principal, and held the latter two parties responsible for failing to safeguard the victim's safety. The principal denied responsibility, citing that the attack took place outside of her work and it was a crime committed by an individual acting independently. On 12 June 2026, the Daejeon District Court ruled that the bereaved family of Kim would receive 127 million won as compensation for the girl's death, and both the government and Myeong were ordered to make the payment, while the claims against the principal were dismissed by the court.

== Response ==
=== Societal reactions ===
Local residents paid respects to the Kim by leaving gifts of chrysanthemums, dolls and sweets outside the school gate. South Korean girl group Ive sent a flower wreath as a condolence to Kim at her funeral. According to her father, Kim was a huge fan of the girl group, and Kim aspired to be a singer like Jang Won-young, her favorite member.

Kim's school was closed for seven days following the murder. The incident prompted concerns about school safety, teacher mental health monitoring, and the education system's capacity to prevent such acts of violence. It also triggered the public's criticism regarding the security and oversight of the government's after-school program. Chung Ick-joong, a professor of social welfare at Ewha Womans University, stated that there were risks to the children's safety as a result of "a lack of clear and detailed regulations" to properly enforce the relevant safety measures, which led to gaps in guidance and child care. In the aftermath of the murder, there was an increased rate of installation of child safety applications and number of new users of the app, reflecting the increased parental concerns over child security.

In June 2025, it was reported that five individuals were charged with defamation in relation to the murder; two of them were charged with posting defamatory content pertaining to the victim while the remaining three were accused of making defamatory remarks online about the case.

=== Political reactions ===
Political figures offered their condolences to the victim and considered new measures to rectify issues highlighted by the case and avert similar tragedies. Acting President Choi Sang-mok offered his condolences during a Cabinet meeting over the child's death and directed both the Education Ministry and the authorities to conduct a thorough investigation of the case. Acting President Choi also attended the funeral of Kim, which took place a day after her death. Impeached South Korean president Yoon Suk Yeol similarly offered his condolences over the death of Kim, and according to his lawyer, Yoon hoped that measures could be implemented to prevent similar tragedies, and that it was "incredibly sad and heartbreaking" for a young girl to be murdered inside a school, where it was an environment for children to play safely.

Education Minister Lee Joo-ho expressed that he would propose for the implementation of the "Kim Ha-neul law" or the "Ha-neul Act", named after the victim, which could introduce measures to monitor the mental health of teachers, mainly to require teachers to take mandatory leave if they are considered unfit to carry out their responsibilities due to mental illness or other health-related conditions, as well as to render urgent intervention should a teacher display unusual symptoms, such as violent behavior.

Kweon Seong-dong of the ruling People Power Party also urged the relevant authorities to conduct a thorough investigation of the case. Kweon also promised that the People Power Party would "do everything in its power to prevent such a tragedy from happening again in schools". Kim Sang-hoon, the People Power Party's top policymaker, stated that there would be consultations with the government to decide on possible policies to safeguard the lives and safety of children in schools.

The education authorities also promised to strengthen existing measures to ensure the safety of children in schools. For instance, the South Chungcheong Education Office planned to provide portable emergency devices to first- and second-graders and enable them to use the devices to notify their parents in urgent situations, as well as text messages to inform parents when their children left the school, permitting the children be accompanied by their legal guardians in after-school programmes, and the installation of AI-based CCTV cameras to detect possible suspicious activities. The North Jeolla Office of Education also announced their plans to enhance the supervision and review of teachers on leave, mainly to assess if they were suitable to return to their jobs. The North Gyeongsang provincial government also considered increasing the rate of police patrols, implementing a "safety network" for parents and expanding escort services, enabling firefighters and officers to accompany children leaving public care institutions.

=== Family's reactions ===
In an interview conducted a day after his daughter's death, Kim's 38-year-old father expressed his regret for his elder child, feeling that if he and his wife had not enrolled Kim into the hagwon she was supposed to attend on the date of her death, Kim would probably still be alive. Kim's father described Kim as a thoughtful girl who cheered the couple on, took care of her younger sibling and mixed well with her friends. He felt disappointed in the school for not sufficiently ensuring that his daughter made it safely out of the school and for not taking sufficient action in monitoring the suspect's condition before the killing.

Kim's father also urged the authorities to seek a harsh punishment for his daughter, and asked for the authorities and government to ensure that laws were implemented to better protect children from teachers with mental disorders in cases where the safety of students were at risk.

=== Experts' opinions ===
Several legal and psychiatric experts shared their opinions on the case. Pyo Chang-won, director of a criminal science institute, analayzed the case and found that the suspect exhibited aggressive and violent tendencies and that she targeted a vulnerable and weak victim of young age, which further corroborated these characteristics demonstrated by the perpetrator. Oh Yoon-seong, a professor of police administration at Soonchunhyang University, expressed his opinion that the crime was more likely to be premeditated, citing the fact that the teacher bought a weapon before the crime and lured Kim to the audiovisual room.

Professor Lee Hun-jung of Korea University Anam Hospital's psychiatry department stated that depression was unlikely to be the cause of this crime, given that it was difficult for patients with the disorder to display aggressive tendencies, while President Kim Dong-wook of the Korean Society of Mental Health (director of Garam Mental Health Clinic) also agreed that patients diagnosed with schizophrenia or depression would not show aggressiveness unless for self-defence reasons, and depression was not the primary factor behind the murderous actions of Kim's alleged killer. Bae Sang-hoon, a professor in Woosuk University's Department of Police Administration, concurred that the crime did not stem from the psychiatric condition of the suspect, but it indicated a form of "power-assertive murder", where the perpetrator deliberately targeted a victim weaker than them to assert some degree of dominance, and pointed out that depression was not an excuse to the suspect's premeditation and decision to procure the murder weapon beforehand and target a child.

Paik Jong-woo, a professor of psychiatry at Kyung Hee University College of Medicine, expressed disappointment over the inaction towards the prior personality issues of the suspect, and cited that there could have been measures undertaken to intervene and avert any possible crimes, like engaging a psychiatrist to properly assess the teacher's mental well-being. Overall, many experts cautioned against concluding depression as the main cause of the murder, as patients with depression would not resort to violence and harm others, but rather would engage in self-harm behaviours. The murder case exposed the significant absence of a structured mental health management system and legal safeguards for educators in Korea.

== See also ==
- Death of Jeong-In
- Murder of Ko Joon-hee
