= Jeong Su-il =

South Korean historian (1934–2025)

- 정수일
- Jeong speaking in 2017
- Born: 12 November 1934; Yanbian, Jilin, Manchukuo
- Died: 24 February 2025 (aged 90); Seoul, South Korea
- Other name: Muhammad Kansu (pseudonym)
- Education: Peking University (BA); Cairo University (MA)
- Occupation: Historian
- Title: President of the Korea Institute of Civilisational Exchanges

Korean name
- Hangul: 정수일
- Hanja: 鄭守一
- RR: Jeong Suil
- MR: Chŏng Suil

Chinese name
- Traditional Chinese: 鄭守一
- Simplified Chinese: 郑守一
Transcriptions
Standard Mandarin
- Hanyu Pinyin: Zhèng Shǒuyī

Jeong Su-il (Korean: 정수일, also transliterated as Chong Suil; 12 November 1934 – 24 February 2025) was a South Korean historian who specialised in Silk Road history and the history of West Asia.

Raised in China by ethnic Korean parents, Jeong worked as a Chinese diplomat before immigrating to North Korea in the 1960s. He was trained as a North Korean spy in the 1970s, and in 1984 he entered South Korea under the identity of Muhammed Kansu, a Filipino-Lebanese academic. Jeong worked in South Korea as a professor until 1996, when his identity and espionage activities were discovered. He was sentenced to fifteen years in prison.

Jeong was released in 2000, received South Korean citizenship in 2005, and continued to work as an academic in South Korea until his death.

== Early life in China ==
Jeong Su-il was born to ethnic Korean parents in Yanbian, Jilin, Manchukuo (Japanese-occupied China). His grandfather had come to China during the Japanese occupation of the Korean Peninsula in the early 20th century. Jeong was the third of six children, and the eldest son. He always considered himself Korean and studied in ethnic Korean high schools, but he did learn Japanese in elementary school, as it was required in schools by the occupying Japanese forces.

During his last year in high school, he became one of two ethnic Koreans admitted to Peking University when it opened its entrance exam to all students in 1952. At Peking University, Jeong was in the Eastern Studies program, which aimed to train diplomats. As part of the program, he studied Russian and Arabic. One of his professors was the famed historian Ji Xianlin, who suggested that Jeong study in Egypt. He continued his studies at Cairo University from 1956 to 1958, where he also learned English and some German. After graduating, he worked as a Chinese diplomat for five years, serving in Morocco until 1963.

== Life in North Korea and espionage ==
Jeong and his wife, Pak Kwangsuk, migrated to Pyongyang, North Korea, in 1963, where he became naturalised as a citizen. Their choice to go to North Korea may have been influenced by the lack of opportunities in China, discrimination against ethnic Koreans, and/or the anti-academic sentiments of government leaders. Jeong worked at the Eastern Studies Department of Pyongyang International Relations University from 1964 to 1968, and then taught Arabic at Pyongyang International Language University from 1969 to 1974. He and his wife had three daughters in North Korea. Jeong also continued to stay in touch with and visit his family in Yanbian.

He was trained as a spy beginning in September 1974, and continued training for five years. In January 1979, Jeong adopted the pseudonym Yi Ch'olsu and travelled to Lebanon, acquiring a Lebanese passport later that year. He also travelled to Tunisia, Papua New Guinea, and the Philippines, and acquired Filipino citizenship in February 1984. From 1982 to 1984, he taught in Malaysia at the University of Malaya in the Academy of Islamic Studies.

== Life in South Korea ==
In 1984, he entered South Korea under a student visa with the guise of a Filipino researcher of Lebanese descent named Mohammad Kansu. He enrolled at the Korean Language Institute at Yonsei University, and then at Dankook University in September 1984, becoming "the first international student in their doctoral history program". In 1989, he finished his thesis, A Study of the History of Silla and Arab Islamic Empire Relationships, and obtained his PhD in 1990. In 1988, he was offered a visiting professorship in Arabic Studies at Dankook, and became South Korea's "sole expert in Arabic Studies". Jeong married a South Korean woman, Yoon Soon-Hee, in 1988, and attended Seoul Central Mosque twice a month. He became a respected figure in the city's Muslim community and a household name in South Korea for his writing, columns, and lectures. In 1991, he wrote an excerpt for a middle school textbook published by the South Korean Ministry of Education. Jeong smuggled information back to North Korea by using hotel fax machines to fax a North Korean agent stationed in Beijing.

He was arrested in 1996, while using a hotel's business centre to send a fax, after a hotel clerk mistakenly identified him as a drug dealer. In the aftermath of his arrest, his false identity was revealed, making headlines in the country. Dankook University fired Jeong and revoked his PhD. He was charged with "espionage and 'abetting the enemy'" and was sentenced to 15 years in prison in 1997. While in Daegu Hwawon Prison, Jeong continued to write, including writing the first half of his Silk Road Encyclopaedia.

Jeong was released in 2000 after being granted amnesty. In 2003, he was offered a teaching position at Korea University, where he taught Islamic culture and medieval history. He received South Korean citizenship in 2005. In August 2006, he established the Silk Road School, which offers tours. In 2008, he founded the Korea Institute of Civilisation Exchanges, of which he was president at the time of his death. In 2011, he visited his hometown for the first time in 60 years. From 2017 to 2018, he served as the third president of the World Silk Road Association. In 2022, he published a memoir, People of the times, follow your calling.

Jeong embarked on numerous journeys along the Silk Road to study the cultural exchange. Major works include A History of Trans-Civilisational Exchanges (2002) and The Encyclopaedia of Silk Road (2013). Jeong suggested that the Silk Road's northern route started in Gyeongju, Silla, rather than Xi'an, China.

Jeong died in Seoul on 24 February 2025, at the age of 90.

== Writings ==
- 신라·서역 교류사 [History of Exchanges between the Silla Dynasty and the West]. 1994.
- 세계속의 동과 서 [The East and the West in the World]. 1995.
- The Elementary Arabic (1995)
- The Silkroadology (2001)
- 문명의문명 교류사 연구 [The Study of the History of the Civilisational Exchanges]. 2002.
- The Civilization of Islam (2002)
- 문명의 루트 실크로드 [Silk Road, the Route of Civilisation]. 2002.
- 왕오천축국전 (학고재, 2004)
- 소걸음으로... [Small Steps...]. 2004.
- 한국 속의 세계 [The World in Korea]. 2005.; two volumes
- 실크로드 문명기행 [Journey of the Silk Road Civilisation]. 2006.
- The Life and Religion of the Silk Road (2006)
- 문명담론과 문명교류 [Civilisation Discourse and Civilisation Exchange]. 2009.
- 실크로드 사전 (in Korean). 창비. 31 October 2013. ISBN 978-89-364-0343-0.
  - English translation: The Silk Road Encyclopaedia. Seoul Selection. 2016. ISBN 978-1-62412-066-4.
- Haesang silken rodeu sajeoti [The Silk Road book: the sea route]. Ch'angbi. 2014.
- Silkeu rodeu (Ch'angbi; 2014)
- 문명의 보고 라틴아메리카를 가다 2: 정수일의 세계문명기행 (in Korean). 창비 Changbi Publishers. 18 October 2016. ISBN 978-89-364-0568-7.
- 문명의 요람 아프리카를 가다 [Travelling to Africa, the Cradle of Civilisation]. 2018.
- 우리 안의 실크로드 [The Silk Road Within Us]. 2020.
- 민족론과 통일담론 [Nationalism and Unification Discourse]. 2020.
- 시대인, 소명에 따르다 [People of the times, follow your calling]. 2022.

== Translations ==
- 이븐 바투타 여행기 1, 2
  - Translation of The Travels (الرحلة, Rihla) of Ibn Battuta (2001)
- 오도릭의 동방기행 [Odoric's Journey to the East]. 2012.
  - Translation of The Eastern Parts of the World Described of Odoric de Pordenone
- 혜초의 왕오천축국전 (An Account of Travel to the Five Indian Kingdoms (Wang ocheonchukguk jeon) by Hyecho, 2004
- Cathay and the Way Thither of Sir Henry Yule
