= Memorial Day (South Korea) =

National holiday in South Korea

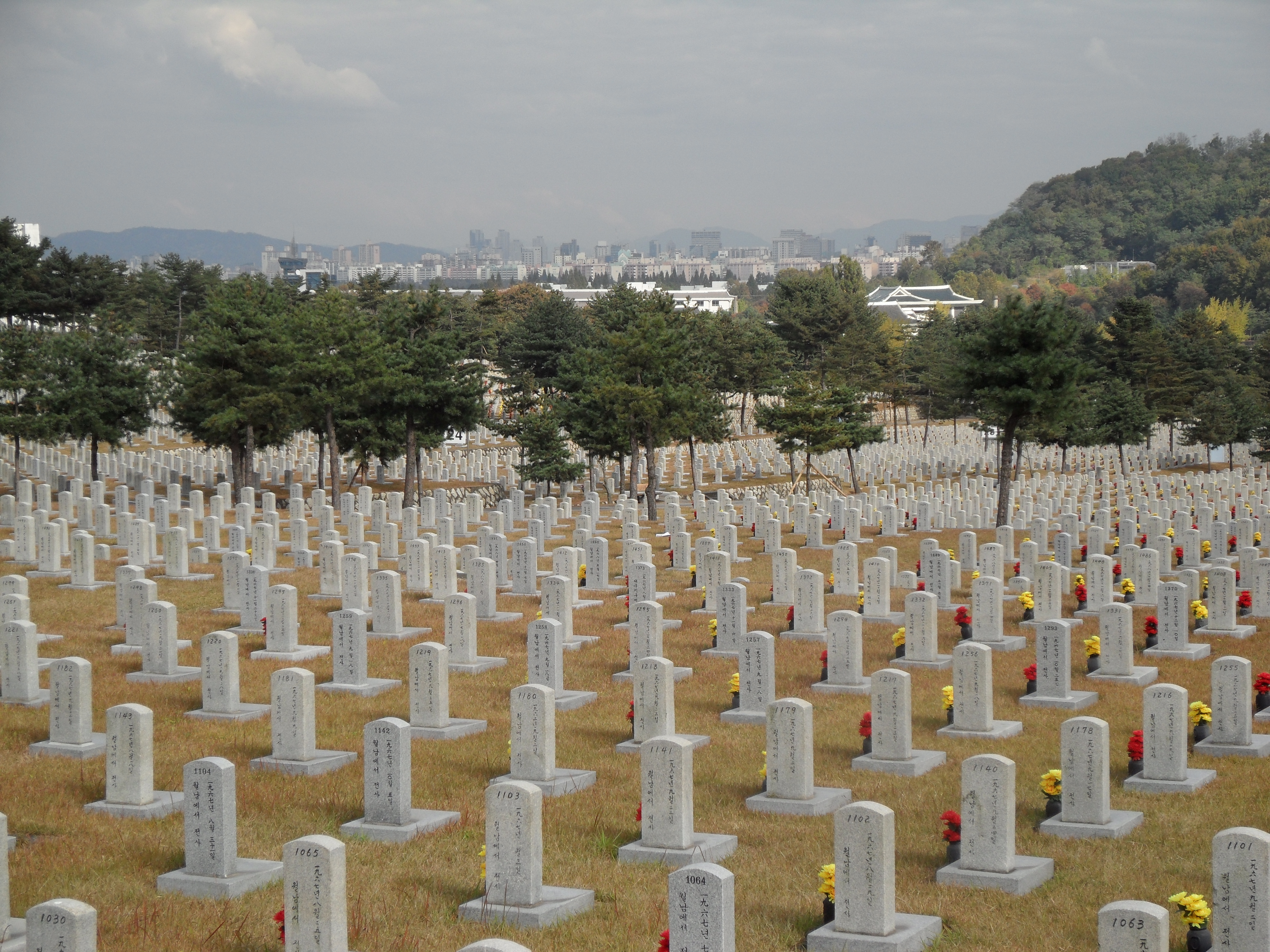
- Seoul National Cemetery
- Observed by: South Korea
- Date: June 6
- Next time: 6 June 2026
- Frequency: Annual

- Memorial Day
- Hangul: 현충일
- Hanja: 顯忠日
- RR: Hyeonchungil
- MR: Hyŏnch'ungil

Memorial Day or Hyeonchungil (Korean: 현충일) is a South Korean public holiday on the sixth day of June by article 2, subparagraph 8. of 'Regulations On Holidays Of Government Offices' that commemorates all the Koreans who have contributed or died while serving the Republic of Korea.

== Background ==
On this day, a memorial ceremony is held in Seoul National Cemetery, first started in 1956. At 10 a.m. on Memorial Day, a siren rings all over the country, and people have silent prayers for one minute. The South Korean flag is flown at half-staff. Usually, President of South Korea, Prime Minister, Speaker of the National Assembly, Chief Justice of the Supreme Court of Korea, President of the Constitutional Court of Korea, and Chairperson of National Election Commission join this Memorial Day as heads of highest constitutional institution in South Korea. In every year this annual day of 10 a.m., they give a silent prayer and remember the Righteous army, Korean Liberation Army and Republic of Korea Armed Forces.

== Celebration ==
On Sunday 7 June 2020, President of South Korea Moon Jae-in celebrated the 100th anniversary of victorious day in Battle of Bongoh Town and announced "This battle was first of greatest victory for Korean Independent Army". Also, he announced the "Greatest leader of Korean Independent Army Hong Beom-do's remains stay in Kazakhstan. So, I will make sure this hero's remains return to South Korea and promise to restore the honor of the most honorable man in South Korea, Hong Beom-do".
