= Chungam Faction =

2022 South Korean political faction

Chungam Faction 충암파
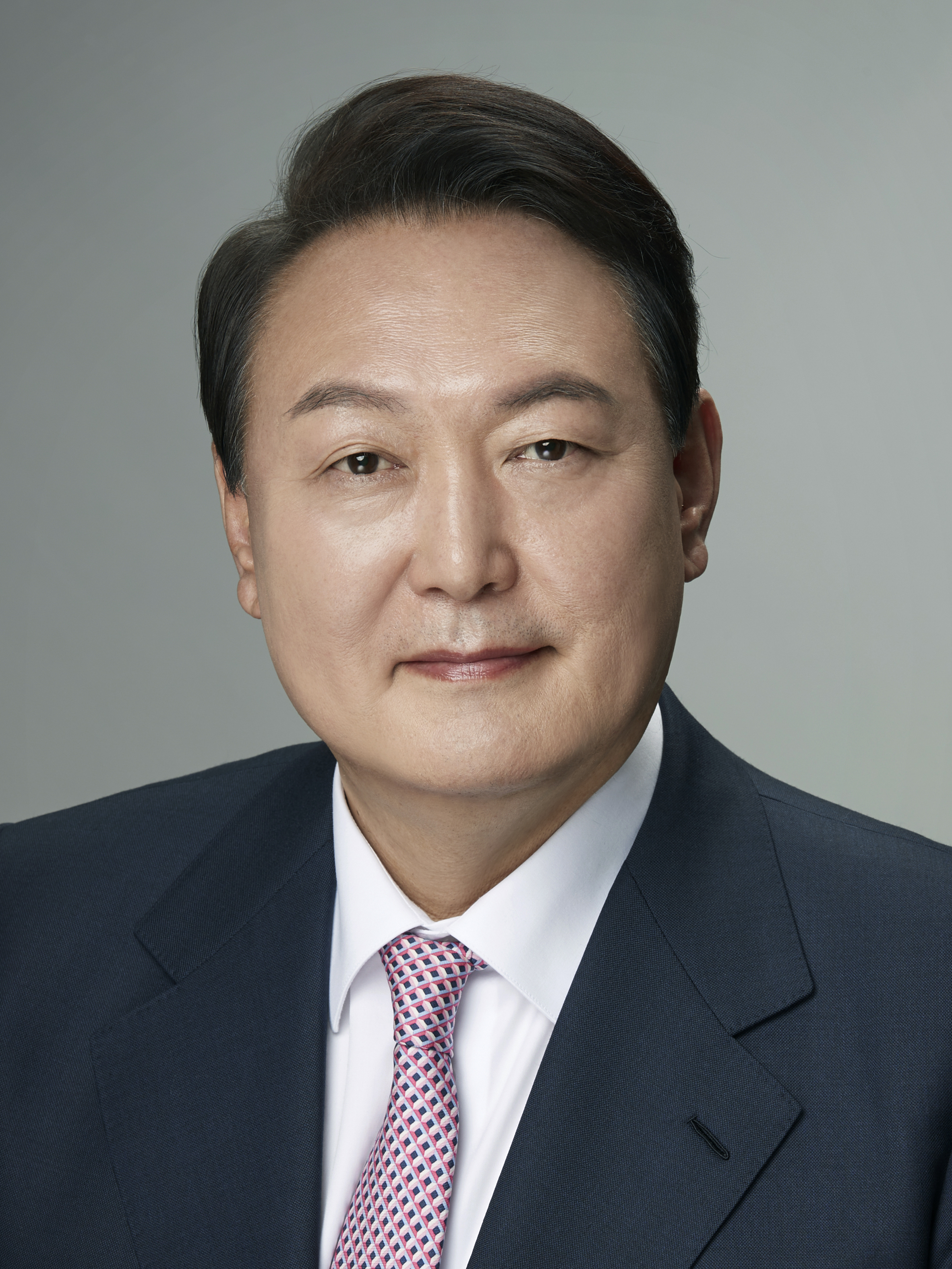
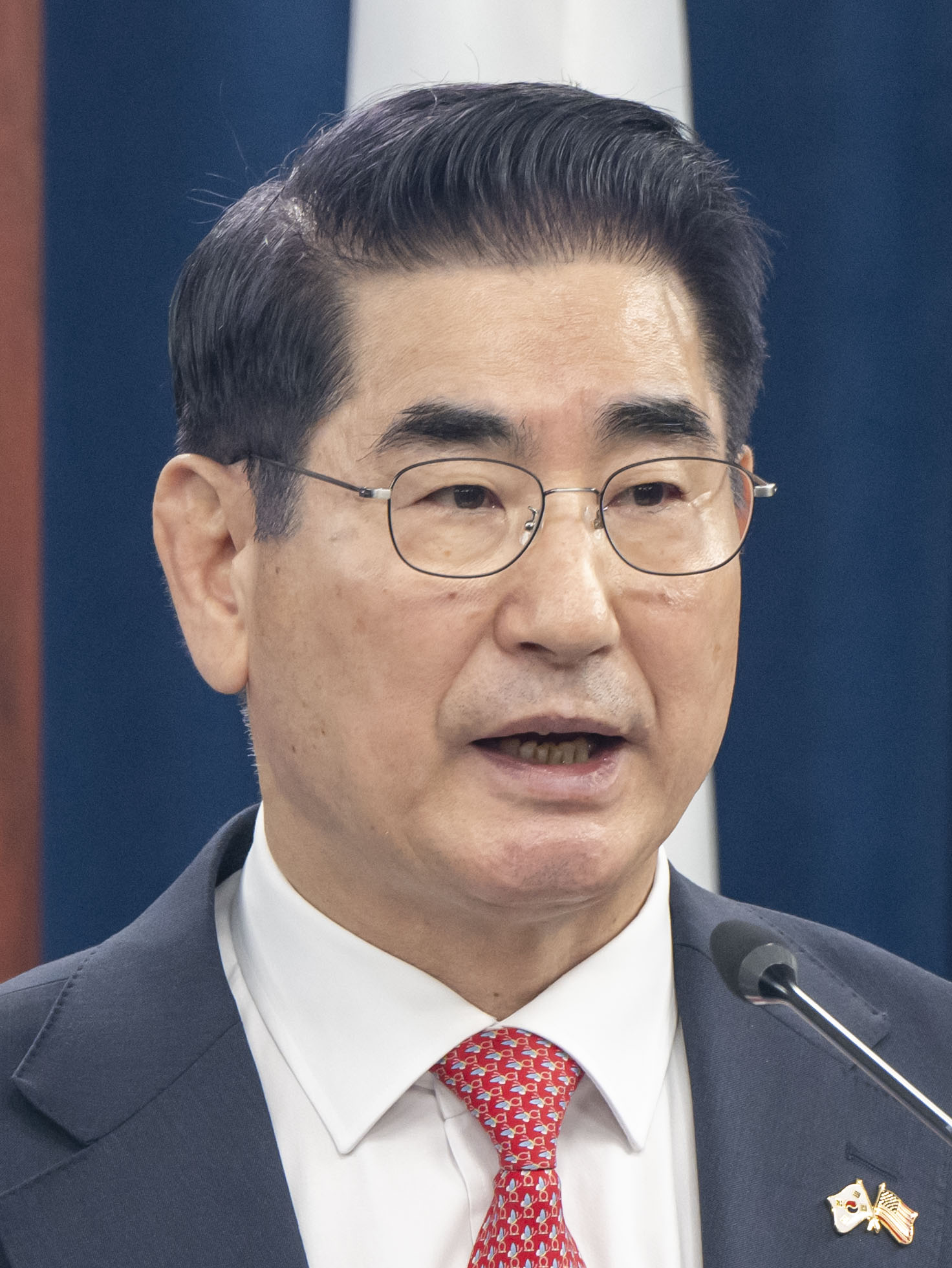
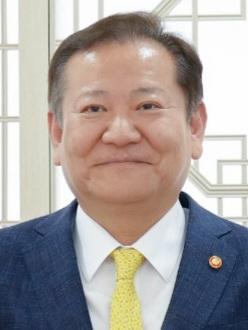
- From left to right: President Yoon Suk Yeol, Minister of National Defense Kim Yong-hyun, and Minister of the Interior and Safety Lee Sang-min; all of whom are members of the Chungam Faction.
- Leader: Yoon Suk Yeol
- Founders: Yoon Suk Yeol; Kim Yong-hyun
- Founded: 2022
- Membership: People Power Party; (Chungam High School alumni)
- Ideology: Authoritarianism; Ultraconservatism; South Korean ultranationalism Radical anti-communism Militarism
- Political position: Far-right

Korean name
- Hangul: 충암파
- Hanja: 冲岩派
- RR: Chungampa
- MR: Ch'ungamp'a

The Chungam Faction (Note: Korean: 충암파; also known as Chungampa and the Chungam High School line.) is a South Korean political faction that refers to Chungam High School alumni who held key positions within the military and government during President Yoon Suk Yeol's administration. The faction was formed in 2022, by President Yoon and Presidential Security Service Director Kim Yong-hyun, both fellow graduates of Chungam High School, after Yoon was elected as president.

Throughout his presidency, Yoon would consistently appoint politicians within the faction to higher roles, and promote military generals within the faction to higher ranks. Yoon and Kim would also host gatherings and drinking sessions with the faction in private settings. In early 2024, Yoon would begin to hold private meetings within the faction to discuss martial law. The faction has been described as Yoon's ulterior motive for a self-coup.

Speculation of the faction's existence came to light in August 2024, when Yoon appointed Kim as the Minister of National Defense. The faction's existence was confirmed in December 2024, after Yoon declared emergency martial law during a televised address, in which the faction played a major role.

Yoon and Kim were both eventually arrested for their role in the declaration. Despite this, the Chungam Faction is yet to be disbanded, with confirmed Counterintelligence Command activities within the faction occurring in January 2025. The faction's existence and impact raised concerns about the potential risks of political figures surrounding themselves with loyalists. Citizens have compared the faction to the Hanahoe faction of former dictator Chun Doo-hwan and his successor Roh Tae-woo.

== History ==
Yoon Suk Yeol and Kim Yong-hyun met and became friends in 1977, while they were both attending Chungam High School. Kim was one year Yoon's senior. However, the two did not become close friends until decades later in 2020, when Yoon began living a life of exile after he was suspended from his prosecutor general duties by Minister of Justice Choo Mi-ae. Yoon called Kim over to have a drink, where the two had conversations about prominent political South Korean figures. This reportedly got Yoon interested in running for president. Kim also convinced Yoon to form a faction full of graduates from Chungam High School if he was elected, which resulted in the Chungam Faction later being formed. After Yoon was elected president, Chungam High School's website nicknamed Yoon "The Son of Chungam."

Outside of Yoon and Kim, known members of the Chungam Faction include:

- Minister of the Interior and Safety Lee Sang-min (graduated in 1983)
- General Lee Chung-ho, Chief of the Jeju Special Self-Governing Province Police Agency (graduated in 1983)
- Lieutenant General Kwak Jong-geun, Chief of the Army Special Warfare Command (graduated in 1987)
- Lieutenant General Yeo In-hyung, Commander of the Defense Counterintelligence Command (graduated in 1988)
- Lieutenant General Lee Jin-woo, Commander of the Capital Defense Command (graduated in 1988)
- Superintendent General Hwang Se-young, Chief of the 101st Security Brigade (graduated in 1989)
- Major General Park Jong-seon, commander of the Defense Security Agency (known as 777th Intelligence Command) of the Defense Intelligence Agency (graduated in 1990)
- Colonel Park Sung-ha, Director of the Planning and Management Office of the Counterintelligence Command (unknown graduation date)

Yoon and Kim met each other while they were both attending Chungam High School. Kim allegedly knew Yeo In-hyung subsequent to his graduation. Since the other members of the faction graduated years apart from both Yoon and Kim, they did not know them personally. It is alleged that Yoon met them sometime during his presidential campaign. It has also been speculated that Chief of Staff of the Army Park An-su may have had activities within the faction, despite him graduating from Deokwon High School, rather than Chungam High School.

In December 2022, Yeo In-hyung was appointed as the Joint Chiefs of Staff's Chief Directorate of Operations. In November 2023, numerous military generals within the faction were appointed to lieutenant general, including Yeo In-hyung, Lee Jin-woo, and Kwak Jong-geun. Kwak had been denied the rank three times by previous administrations. Yeo was appointed as the Defense Counterintelligence Commander, Kwak Jong-geun was appointed as the Chief of the Army Special Warfare Command, and Lee Jin-woo was appointed as Commander of the Capital Defense Command.

In October 2023, then-Minister of National Defense Shin Won-sik unsuccessfully attempted to create his own faction within the military called the Defense Faction, to compete against the Chungam Faction.

Throughout 2023 and 2024, Yoon and Kim would hold private gatherings with the faction. Here, Yoon would conduct drinking sessions, as well as cook Kimchi-jjigae and Omelette as snacks. During these gatherings, they would have conversations related to the National Assembly, the Democratic Party, and the Army Special Warfare Command.

After the April 2024 legislative election, in which the ruling People Power Party suffered a landslide defeat against the Democratic Party, Yoon began to mention the possibility of declaring martial law frequently. Such discussions were had in private meetings with members of the faction where Yoon, Kim Yong-hyun, and Yeo In-hyung were always present.

=== Conjecture ===
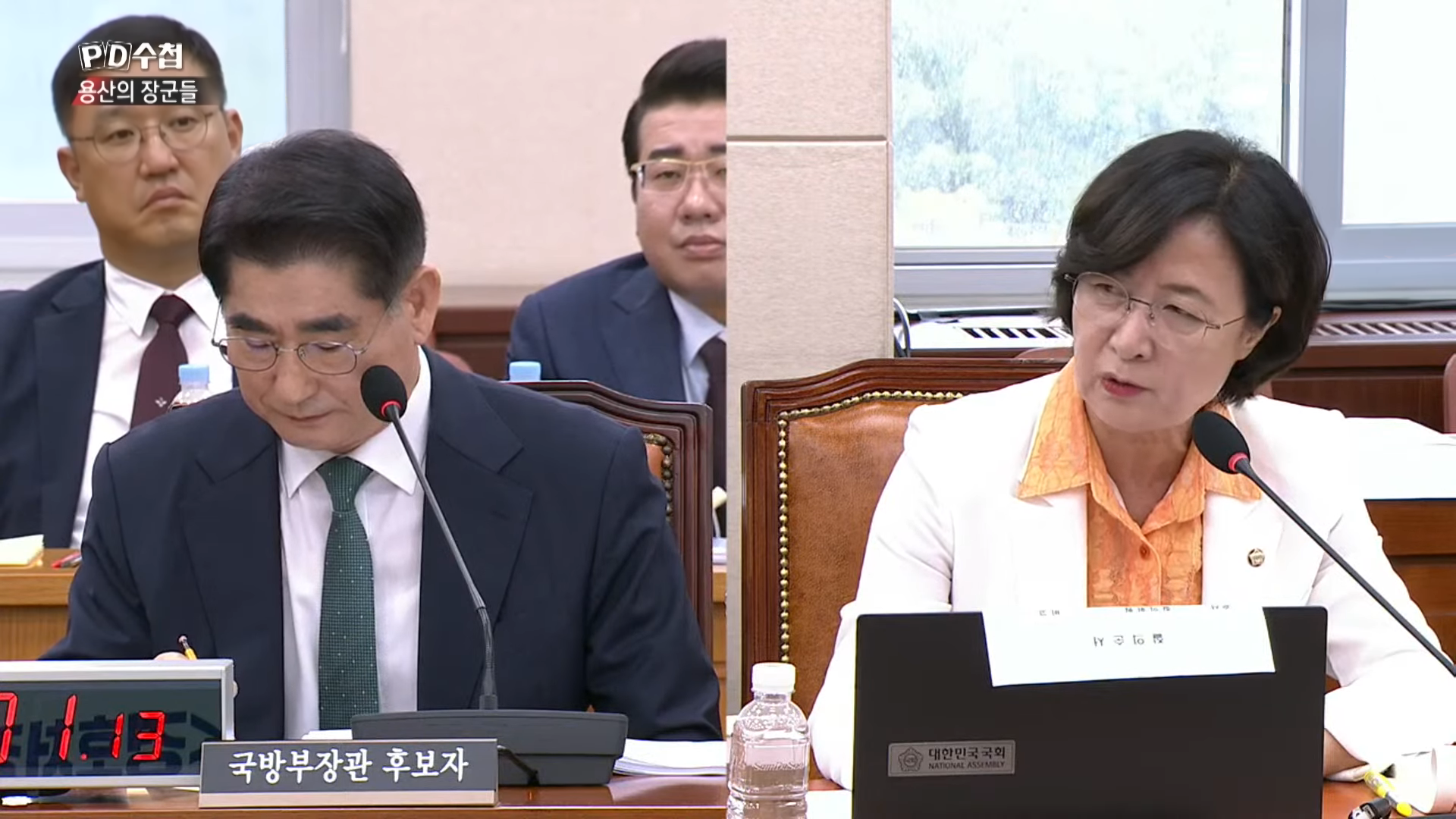
Rep. Choo Mi-ae questioning Kim at his Defense Minister confirmation hearing, 2 September 2024

Speculation of the faction's existence began in August 2024, after Yoon nominated Kim as the Minister of National Defense. Lawmakers speculated that Kim's appointment was a part of an upcoming martial law strategy to prevent First Lady Kim Keon Hee from going to prison.

During his confirmation hearing on 2 September 2024, Democratic Representative Park Sun-won would point out that along with Kim's appointment, several key military positions have been filled with figures who had personal connections to Yoon, all of whom graduated from the same alma mater, Chungam High School. Park would also point out that these figures were also being promoted to higher roles consistently. Park then suggested that these key military figures could play a critical role in imposing martial law in a contingency. Kim dismissed these speculations, stating; "Confirmation hearings are not a place for false propaganda based on misinformation."

During the same hearing, Democratic Representative Choo Mi-ae would speculate that if confirmed, Kim might use his Defense Minister position to appoint his loyalists to key military roles. Choo would point out that Yeo In-hyung had received numerous promotions during Yoon's term, stating; "General Yeo In-hyung is being promoted too quickly. He will probably reach full general rank by the end of Yoon Suk Yeol's term." Choo then asked Kim if Yeo's constant promotions were part of a strategy to center the military around Yoon's personal agenda, as she was aware that they both graduated from Chungam High School. Kim denied this claim.

Choo also alleged that Yoon appointing Kim as Defense Minister after appointing Yeo as Defense Counterintelligence Commander was part of a potential imposition of martial law, claiming that the idea of two graduates of the same alma mater serving as Defense Minister and Defense Counterintelligence Commander was suspicious and potentially dangerous, as such an occurrence "has never happened before." Kim disagreed, stating; "In the past, there have been cases where the Defense Minister and Defense Counterintelligence Commander were from the same high school." Kim took office as Minister of National Defense on 6 September.

== Involvement in the 2024 martial law crisis ==
On 3 December 2024, Yoon declared emergency martial law across the nation during a televised address. In his declaration, Yoon accused the Democratic Party (DPK), which has a majority in the National Assembly, of conducting "anti-state activities" and collaborating with "North Korean communists" to destroy the country, thereby creating a "legislative dictatorship". The order prohibited political activities, including gatherings of the National Assembly and local legislatures, and suspended the free press.

Following the declaration, Yeo In-hyung gave National Intelligence Service (NIS) Deputy Director Hong Jang-won a list of individuals targeted for arrest which Hong could not recall completely:

- Democratic Party leader Lee Jae Myung
- National Assembly Speaker Woo Won-shik
- People Power Party leader Han Dong-hoon
- Democratic Party Rep. Kim Min-seok
- Democratic Party floor leader Park Chan-dae
- National Assembly Legislation and Judiciary Committee Chair Jung Chung-rae
- Rebuilding Korea Party leader Cho Kuk
- Liberal journalist Kim Ou-joon
- Former Supreme Court Chief Justice Kim Myeong-su
- Kim Min-woong, brother of Rep. Kim Min-seok and leader of the Candlelight Movement
- Former National Election Commission (NEC) Chairman Kwon Soon-il

Upon hearing that lawmakers were trying to vote down the declaration, President Yoon then ordered Kwak Jong-geun and Lee Jin-woo to break through the plenary chamber doors to drag the lawmakers out at 00:40 to 00:50 hours, which was too late as the lawmakers had begun the session to end martial law at that time. Yoon also called Police Commissioner General Cho Ji-ho several times and instructed him to arrest all the lawmakers trying to enter the National Assembly, stating "Bring them in. It's illegal. All the lawmakers are violating the proclamation. Arrest them." Yoon also told Lee; "Break down the doors, even if it means shooting." When he was notified the lawmakers had begun the session to end martial law, Yoon ordered Kwak to "break down the door with an axe and go in and get them all out." Kim also ordered; "Stop the number of National Assembly members so that it is less than 150. Bring the National Assembly members out." Kim also prioritized the arrests and detention of Lee Jae Myung, Woo Won-shik, and Han Dong-hoon from the National Assembly.

At 01:02 on 4 December, 190 legislators who had arrived at the National Assembly Proceeding Hall unanimously passed a motion to lift martial law, despite attempts by the Republic of Korea Army Special Warfare Command to prevent the vote. At 04:30, Yoon and his cabinet lifted martial law and soon disbanded the Martial Law Command. The opposition subsequently began impeachment proceedings against Yoon and said it would continue to do so if he did not resign.

The declaration was opposed by both parties and resulted in protests. Due to the Chungam Faction's involvement in the declaration, the event was widely characterized by news organizations, both international and domestic, and Korean politicians as an attempted self-coup.

== Legal investigations ==
Following the martial law declaration, the Democratic party called for Defense Minister Kim Yong-hyun's impeachment for proposing martial law to Yoon, and intended to file a criminal complaint against him. On 5 December, the police investigated Yoon and other key officials for alleged insurrection in response to a case filed by minor opposition parties and 59 activists accusing them of treason. The investigations led to the Chungam Faction being publicly discovered. Amid widespread criticism and mass protests, an impeachment motion was introduced against Yoon the next day, though it fell short of the 200 votes needed to pass. Yoon was successfully impeached and suspended from his presidential powers in a second vote ten days later, with 204 voting in favor, including 12 members of his own party.

Defense Minister Kim Yong-hyun resigned the same day and issued an apology. The Ministry of Justice barred Kim from leaving the country following rumors that he booked a flight to flee overseas to avoid prosecution. The DPK planned to appoint a permanent special counsel to investigate Yoon for treason and considered filing charges against PPP Floor Leader Cho Kyung-ho, who urged PPP lawmakers to assemble at the party's headquarters rather than the Assembly. On 8 December, Kim Yong-hyun was arrested on suspicion of committing insurrection by advising Yoon to declare martial law and sending troops into the National Assembly to seize the legislature. He could potentially be sentenced to life in prison, or the death penalty if found guilty.

Yoon Suk Yeol was summoned three times by the Corruption Investigation Office for High-ranking Officials (CIO) for questioning on 18 December, 25 December, and 29 December over his declaration of martial law. He ignored all three summonses. In response, on 30 December, the CIO filed an arrest warrant for Yoon at the Seoul Western District Court. On the morning of 15 January 2025, Yoon was arrested at his residence where he had been since the impeachment. Police used wire-cutters and ladders to enter Yoon's residence in order to bypass barricades and barbed wire fortifications. After his arrest Yoon was brought to the CIO, where he agreed to an interrogation. Yoon was the country's first sitting president to be arrested. On 20 January, Lee Jin-woo was dishonorably discharged from the military for his role in the declaration, while on 6 February, both Yeo In-hyung and Kwak Jong-geun were placed on leave. On 4 April, the Constitutional Court unanimously upheld Yoon's impeachment by the National Assembly, officially terminating his presidency. Yoon announced his departure from the PPP in May. As well as Kim Yong-hyun, Yoon is currently being investigated for heading an insurrection, and may face either life imprisonment or the death penalty if convicted.

The National Assembly later called for the exclusion from office of those referred to as members of the Chungam Faction within the Counterintelligence Command. Despite this, even after the arrests of the faction's founders, the Chungam Faction is yet to be disbanded. In January 2025, the faction led personnel changes for Counterintelligence Command officers after the martial law declaration.

On 21 August, former Minister Lee Sang-min was interviewed by prosecutors. Here, it was confirmed that Yoon only appointed Lee as Minister of Interior and Safety because he graduated from Chungam High School, and that he and Kim "hardly knew each other." Lee also denied the charge of ordering the Fire Department Commissioner to cut off power and water to media outlets on the day of the martial law order, however the Fire Department Commissioner maintains that he received the order.

On 27 August, it was discovered by prosecutors that sometime in early 2024, Yeo In-hyung invited Ahn Sung-sik, a former planning and coordination officer at the Korea Coast Guard who attended Chungam High School with Yeo, to meet up with him and two other members of the Chungam Faction to have dinner. The conversations Ahn had with Yeo and the two faction members were never disclosed to the public.

== Reception ==
PD Note's coverage on the Chungam Faction

Following the 2024 martial law declaration, Democratic Representative Kim Min-seok criticized Yoon's administration and the Chungam Faction, stating that Yoon's administration "is so bad at governance that they have no way of preventing their replacement other than martial law, terrorism, and mobilizing the legal system against their opponents."

As a result of the declaration, the Chungam High School staff and students received public backlash by citizens over the faction. In return, the school ultimately announced that students were not mandated to wear their uniforms to school until graduation in an attempt to protect them from harassment. They also confirmed they had no association with both the declaration and the faction. Chungam High School Foundation Chairwoman Yoon Myung-hwa called Yoon Suk Yeol and Kim Yong-hyun "shameful graduates" in a social media post, and would state in another post; "The school’s office is flooded with complaint calls all day, and even school bus drivers report being harassed by citizens passing by. There’s even a petition to change the school’s name. The school’s reputation and the country’s honor are tarnished. What kind of mental anguish must our students be enduring?"

The Korea Times columnist Min Seong-jae, a fellow graduate of Chungam High School, commented on the faction stating; "If you are the president or a public official, it is dangerous to surround yourself with loyalists. You only hear what you want to hear. There is no system of checks and balances. And eventually, group interest takes over public interest. This is anti-democratic. Democracy thrives on differences. Instead, Yoon’s dangerous idea seems to have been only reinforced by his inner circle, eventually undermining the well-being of society as a whole." Min later stated; "When a government is filled with people who think alike, dissenting voices are silenced. The result is a system that prioritizes self-preservation over public service."
