= Kim Yong-hyun =

South Korean general and politician (born 1959)

- 김용현
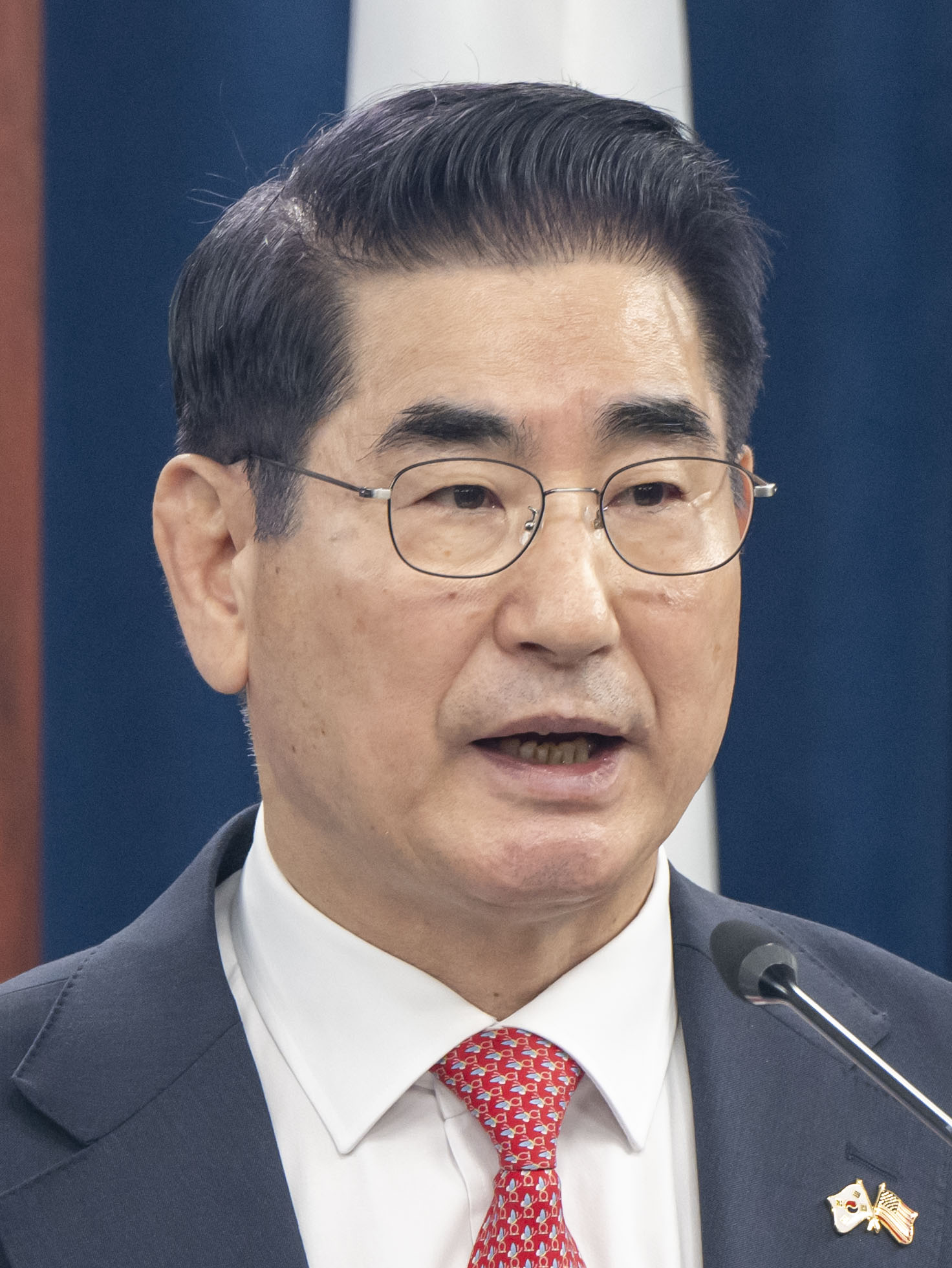
- Kim in 2024

Minister of National Defense
- In office 6 September 2024 – 5 December 2024
- President: Yoon Suk Yeol
- Prime Minister: Han Duck-soo
- Preceded by: Shin Won-sik
- Succeeded by: Kim Seon-ho (acting); Ahn Gyu-back

Chief of the Presidential Security Service
- In office 11 May 2022 – 6 September 2024
- President: Yoon Suk Yeol
- Preceded by: Yoo Yeon-sang
- Succeeded by: Park Jong-joon

Personal details
- Born: 25 June 1959 (age 67) Masan, South Korea
- Other political affiliations: Chungam Faction (since 2022)
- Children: 2
- Education: Chungam High School; Korea Military Academy
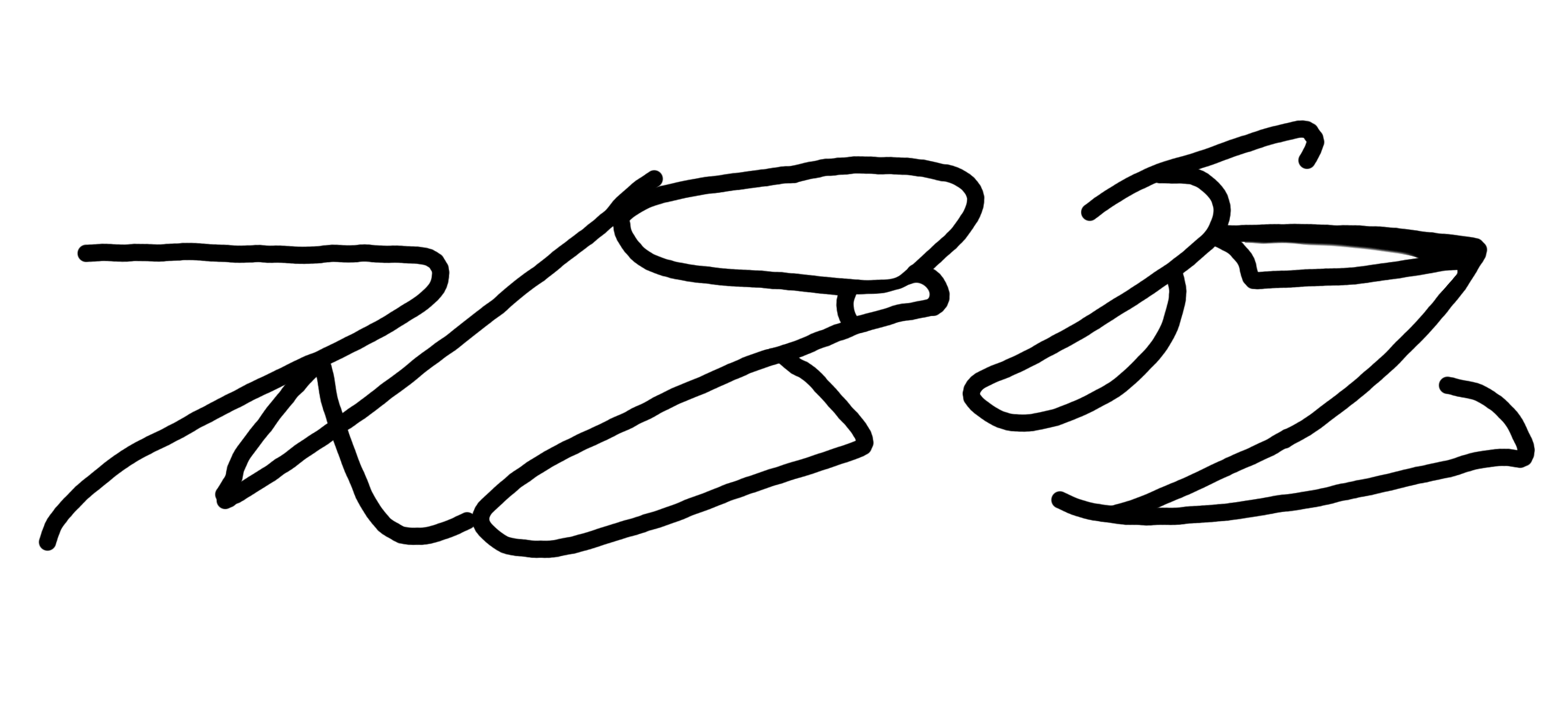
- Signature

Military service
- Branch/service: Republic of Korea Army
- Years of service: 1982–2017
- Rank: Lieutenant general
- Criminal information
- Movement: 2024 martial law
- Status: Imprisoned
- Convictions: 7 counts (Note: Insurrection; Obstruction of justice; Tampering with evidence; Obstruction of official duties; Abuse of power; Treason; Leaking of classified information)
- Penalty: Participating and planning an insurrection: 30 years imprisonment; Obstruction of official duties and tampering with evidence: 3 years imprisonment; North Korea drone infiltration case: 30 years imprisonment; Leaking of classified information: 3 years imprisonment

Details
- Date apprehended: 8 December 2024
- Imprisoned at: Seoul Dongbu Detention Center
- Kim's voice Kim on North Korea's artillery support during the Russo-Ukrainian War; Recorded 30 October 2024

Korean name
- Hangul: 김용현
- Hanja: 金龍顯
- RR: Gim Yonghyeon
- MR: Kim Yonghyŏn

Kim Yong-hyun (Korean: 김용현; born 25 June 1959) is a South Korean former three-star army lieutenant general and politician who served as the minister of national defense from 6 September 2024 until his resignation on 5 December 2024. Kim previously served in the Republic of Korea Army from 1982 until he was discharged in 2017. Kim later served as the Chief of the Presidential Security Service from 11 May 2022 until his Minister of National Defense confirmation on 6 September 2024.

During his political career, Kim was widely known for his close personal ties with President Yoon Suk Yeol, as the two have known each other since high school. Kim graduated one year ahead of Yoon shortly before entering the military. The two became close friends in 2020, following Yoon's suspension as prosecutor general. After Yoon was elected as president in 2022, Yoon appointed Kim as Presidential Security Service Chief. The two later formed a faction within the military and government consisting of their fellow high school alumni, known as the Chungam Faction.

On 3 December 2024, Kim advised President Yoon to impose martial law during a last-minute cabinet meeting. Shortly after, Yoon ultimately declared emergency martial law across the nation. Through the martial law order, Kim ordered military personnel to enter the National Assembly and prevent lawmakers from gathering to vote down the declaration. However the attempt to do so failed as 190 lawmakers made it into the parliament and unanimously voted to lift the martial law only a few hours later on 4 December. After the National Assembly filed an impeachment motion against him, Kim resigned the following day. He attempted to flee the country to avoid prosecution, but was travel barred by the Ministry of Justice.

It was soon revealed that Kim had been planning martial law alongside Yoon for several months. He was appointed Defense Minister as part of a martial law strategy to prevent First Lady Kim Keon Hee from going to prison, as she was subject to several allegations of misconduct including the falsification of academic and financial reports. On 8 December, Kim was arrested for his role in the declaration. Kim would later attempt suicide inside the bathroom of the detention facility he was being held in, shortly before a warrant could be filed against him. On 19 February 2026, Kim was sentenced to 30 years in prison for planning and participating in an insurrection.

== Life and education ==
Kim was born in Masan, South Korea on 25 June 1959. He attended Wolyeong Elementary School, and graduated from Chungam High School in 1978. He later joined the Korea Military Academy and graduated from the academy's 38th class on 28 March 1982, where he began to serve in the Republic of Korea Army until he was discharged in 2017.

Sometime during his life, Kim became a Catholic, and got married and had two children. He has no political party preference, as he claims "there should be no opposition or division in security."

Throughout his political career, several of Kim's former high school alumni claimed that his favorite book to read was Adolf Hitler's autobiographical manifesto Mein Kampf. DPK Rep. Choo Mi-ae would ultimately confirm this to be true during a televised interview, which added to many people's suspicion that Kim, having risen to such a powerful position within both the military and the government, may have been driven by darker instincts rather than a sense of duty to national security. An anonymous alumnus of the Korea Military Academy's 38th class claimed that Kim "had a genuine interest in how political power can be manipulated."

=== History with Yoon Suk Yeol ===
In 1977, Kim met future-president Yoon Suk Yeol while they were both students at Chungam High School. Yoon was one year Kim's junior. At the time, Kim was the head of the school's Student Defense Corps, which was an organization created by the South Korean government in 1975 to replace the student council, to "establish an all-out security system for the school system." Kim explained his relationship with Yoon in an interview, saying; "I heard there was a junior who was good at studying and had a sense of duty, so I called him out of curiosity and asked to meet him." Kim graduated high school in 1978, one year ahead of Yoon. After Kim entered the Korea Military Academy, he lost contact with Yoon. Years later, through an alumni association, they found each other again and stayed in contact. Kim also allegedly knew future-Defense Counterintelligence Commander Yeo In-hyung subsequent to his graduation.

However, the two didn't become close friends until 2020, after Yoon was suspended from his prosecutor general duties by then-Minister of Justice Choo Mi-ae. Living a life of exile due to the suspension, Yoon called Kim over to have a drink. Here, Kim and Yoon had a conversation about prominent political South Korean figures, which reportedly got Yoon interested in running for president. After Yoon announced his campaign, Kim told him; "If you want to win the election, you need to build a campaign centered around Chungam High School alumni and Seoul National University alumni, people who aren't from the prosecution." This allegedly led to the two forming the Chungam Faction after Yoon became president. The faction has been compared to the Hanahoe faction of former dictator Chun Doo-hwan and his successor Roh Tae-woo, due to it having a role in the 2024 martial law declaration.

== Career ==
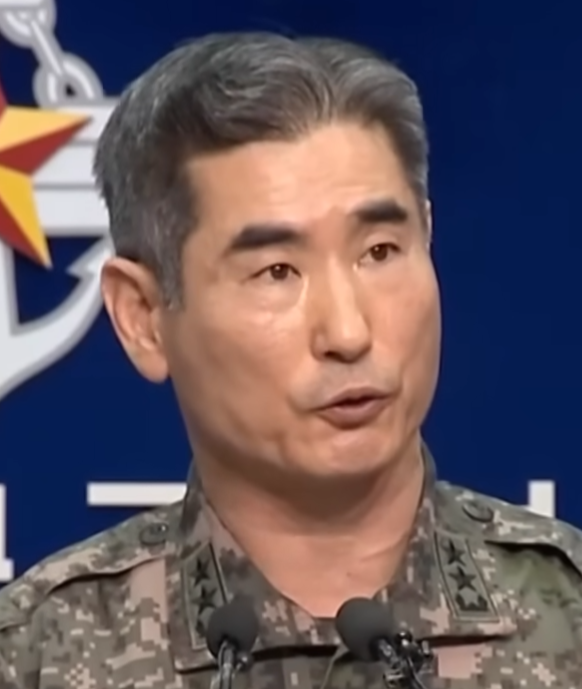
Kim as the Joint Chiefs of Staff's Chief Directorate of Operations

Kim entered the Korea Military Academy shortly after graduating high school. He graduated from the academy's 38th class on 28 March 1982, where he began serving in the Republic of Korea Army. Kim was later promoted to major in 1989, to colonel general in 2003, to brigadier general in 2007, to major general in 2010, and to lieutenant general in 2013.

In 1989, Kim was assigned to the 55th Security Brigade of the Capital Defense Command. In 2003, he served as the Army Headquarters National Assembly Liaison Officer. Kim also led the 17th Infantry Division of the Army from 2010 to 2012. In 2015, President Park Geun-hye nominated Kim as the Joint Chiefs of Staff's Chief Directorate of Operations, where he served until he was discharged from the military on 26 September 2017. Kim retired two months later, but stepped out of retirement after he was elected as the Senior Vice Chairman of the Future Practical Security Forum in April 2018, which he served until Yoon Suk Yeol announced his candidacy for the 2022 presidential election on 29 June 2021.

In September 2016, Minister of National Defense Han Min-goo selected Lim Yo-young to become the four-star army full general of the 38th class, rather than Kim. Kim was discharged from the military on 26 September 2017, and retired two months later on 30 November. Political commentator Chae Jin-won stated in an interview that Kim began to show signs of strange behavior after he was discharged, claiming that he "began to show a lack of philosophy and military spirit." Kim also reportedly felt hatred against Defense Minister Han for not selecting him.

After Yoon was elected president, Kim served as the Chief of the Presidential Security Service from 11 May 2022 until his Minister of National Defense confirmation on 6 September 2024. During his tenure, Kim was involved in the presidential office’s relocation from the Blue House to the Yongsan District. The relocation led to Yoon living alongside other military generals.

=== Alleged assault on Kang Sung-hee ===
On 18 January 2024, Kang Sung-hee. the floor leader of the Progressive Party, was forcefully carried out and removed by presidential security agents at a ceremony launching North Jeolla Province as a special self-governing province after verbally urging President Yoon to "change [his] approach to governance." Footage of the incident shows Kim Yong-hyun, who was still the Chief of the Presidential Security Service at the time, raising his hand and making a gesture as if he was physically striking Kang. Whether or not Kim actually assaulted Kang is unknown. Kang later attempted to re-enter but was again stopped by security guards. Footage of the gesture went viral and sparked mass controversy. The Progressive Party announced they would "hold Yoon's administration accountable" for the incident. Rep. Jeong Seong-ho would call the incident "inappropriate" and would claim Yoon's administration is "worst than Park Geun-hye's administration," in reference to President Park Geun-hye and scandals involving her administration. Democratic Party leader Lee Jae Myung would call Yoon's administration a "monarchy" in response to the incident.

=== Attempts to provoke North Korea crisis ===
Kim at a joint meeting at The Pentagon with U.S Secretary of Defense Lloyd Austin regarding North Korea relations; 30 October 2024

In May 2024, North Korea began sending balloons loaded with trash into South Korea. In October, North Korea accused the South Korean military of flying propaganda leaflet-scattering drones over Pyongyang, which the South Korean military said they were unable to confirm. Sometime in early December, Park Beom-kye, a member of the National Defense Committee of the National Assembly, claimed Kim orchestrated the drone incident to stoke tension with North Korea, and that the DCC took a hands-on role in the incident. Lee Ki-heon of the Intelligence Committee said he had confirmed a report that Kim instructed Chairman of the Joint Chiefs of Staff Admiral Kim Myung-soo to "fire warning shots and then strike the origin of sewage balloons flying from the North", though a spokesperson for the Joint Chiefs of Staff denied this. Lee speculated that Yoon and Defense Minister Kim were trying to provoke a "local war" in order to justify martial law. Admiral Kim refused the order and was verbally abused by Defense Minister Kim. Lee suspected this led Defense Minister Kim to select Army Chief of Staff Park An-su for martial law commander instead, as Admiral Kim would have been the default choice. In October 2024, Defense Minister Kim offered 3 million won in encouragement money to the military psychological warfare unit under the name of "contribution to military readiness." On 1 December, two days before martial law was declared, colonel-level commanders were called to be on guard for an imminent provocation by North Korea, with DCC Commander Yeo In-hyung giving orders to prepare for a "serious North Korean filth balloon situation".

== Minister of National Defense ==
=== Confirmation and tenure ===
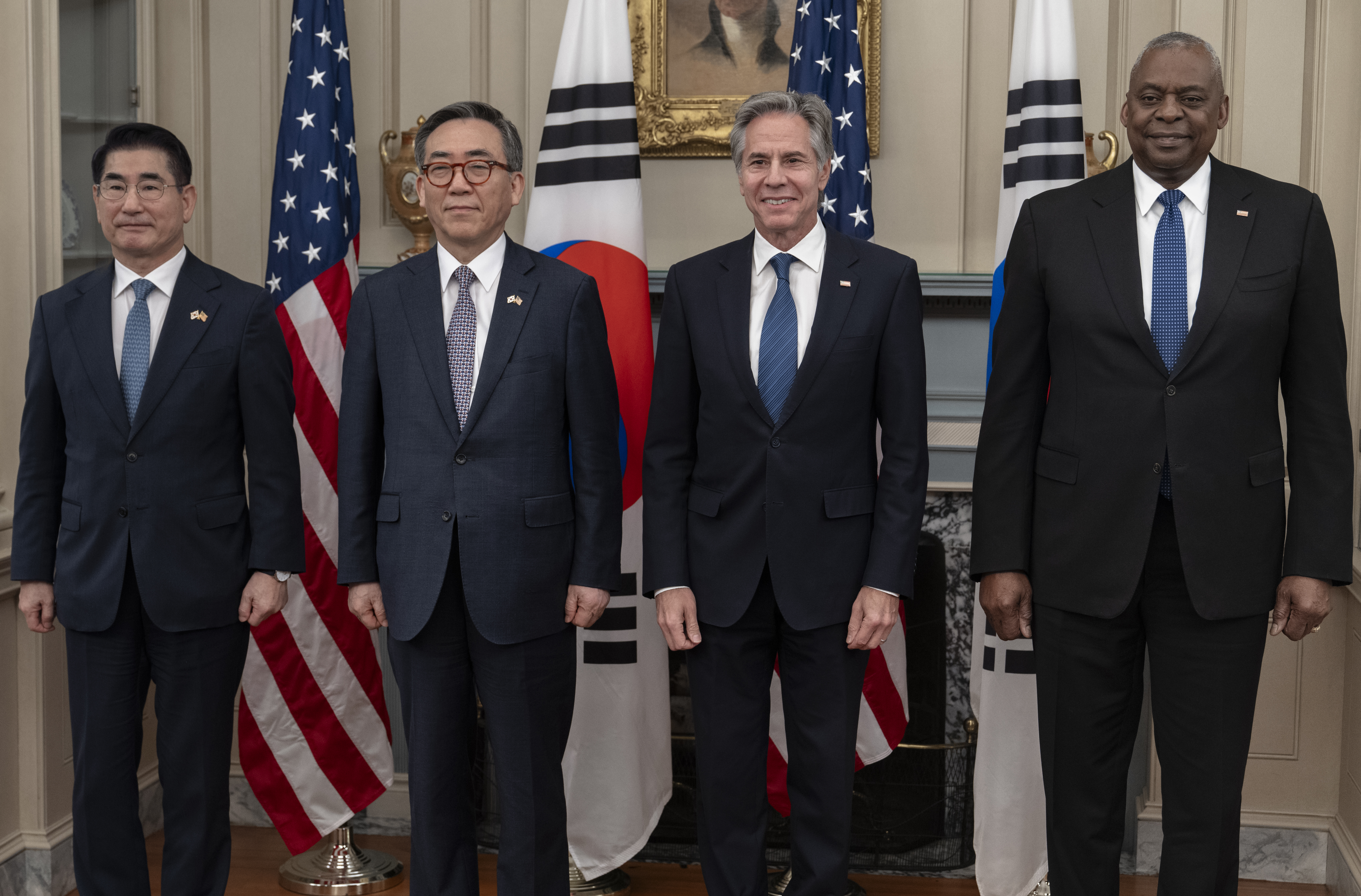
Kim meeting U.S Defense Secretary Lloyd Austin, U.S State Secretary Antony Blinken, and ROK Minister of Foreign Affairs Cho Tae-yul in Washington D.C.

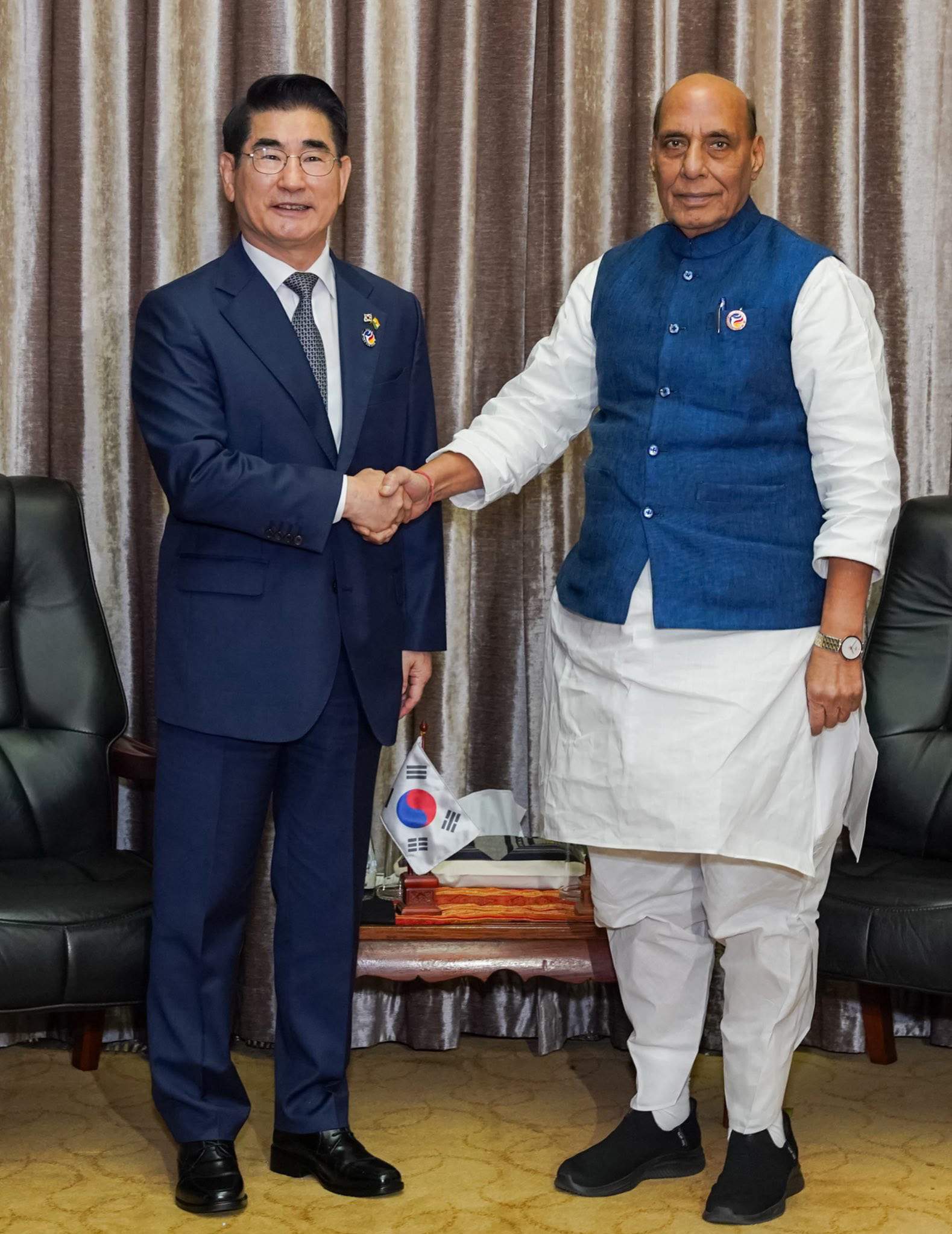
Kim meeting Rajnath Singh as part of the 11th ASEAN Defense Ministers Meeting in Vientiane, Laos

Yoon appointed Kim to be Minister of National Defense on August 12, 2024. Kim's appointment was met with much controversy, as he was appointed without any opposition’s approval. In September 2024, Party leader Lee Jae Myung speculated that Kim's appointment was a part of an upcoming martial law strategy to prevent First Lady Kim Keon Hee from going to prison. Some other DPK lawmakers expressed concerns about the timing of Kim's appointment, which came only one month ahead of a reshuffle of the nation's military leadership scheduled for October. During his confirmation hearing at the National Assembly on 2 September 2024, opposition lawmakers focused on his involvement in the presidential office’s relocation, and his close personal ties with Yoon. Members of the opposition also asked Kim as to whether he would declare martial law or recommend Yoon to do so. He dismissed this, saying "I think talk about martial law is out of date; if it is declared, who would accept it? Do you think the military would even follow the order?"

Democratic Representative Park Sun-won would point out that along with Kim's appointment, several key military positions have been filled with figures who had personal connections to Yoon, all of whom graduated from the same alma mater, Chungam High School. Park would also point out that these figures were also being promoted to higher roles consistently. Park then suggested that these key military figures could play a critical role in imposing martial law in a contingency. Kim dismissed these speculations, stating; "Confirmation hearings are not a place for false propaganda based on misinformation."

During the same hearing, Democratic Representative Choo Mi-ae would speculate that if confirmed, Kim might use his Defense Minister position to appoint his loyalists to key military roles. Choo would point out that Yeo In-hyung had received numerous promotions during Yoon's term, stating; "General Yeo In-hyung is being promoted too quickly. He will probably reach full general rank by the end of Yoon Suk Yeol's term." Choo then asked Kim if Yeo's constant promotions were part of a strategy to center the military around Yoon's personal agenda, as she was aware that they both graduated from Chungam High School. Kim denied this claim.

Choo also alleged that Yoon appointing Kim as Defense Minister after appointing Yeo as Defense Counterintelligence Commander was part of a potential imposition of martial law, claiming that the idea of two graduates of the same alma mater serving as Defense Minister and Defense Counterintelligence Commander was suspicious and potentially dangerous, as such an occurrence "has never happened before." Kim disagreed, claiming; "In the past, there have been cases where the Defense Minister and Defense Counterintelligence Commander were from the same high school." DPK Representative Boo Seung-chan, a former spokesperson for the Defense Ministry, would at one point state that Kim should be "subject to judicial scrutiny." Boo would accuse Kim of allowing foreign spies into military units during his time as Chief of the Presidential Security Service, labelling all visitors anonymously as "guests." Kim would then tell Boo to "watch his words."

Kim took office as Minister of National Defense on 6 September. During his inaugural speech, Kim stated that North Korea "would pay a gruesome price if it provoked the South." Over the following three months, Kim planned military rule under martial law. On 4 October, Kim met up with the United States military at Camp Humphreys. On 30 October, Kim and U.S Secretary of Defense Lloyd Austin held a joint meeting at The Pentagon to brief members of the media regarding South Korea–United States relations, North Korea, and the Russo-Ukrainian War. The following day on 31 October, Kim and Austin met up with U.S Secretary of State Antony Blinken, and ROK Minister of Foreign Affairs Cho Tae-yul in Washington, D.C..

Kim resigned from his position on 5 December, after an impeachment motion was filed against him over his role in the 2024 martial law declaration.

== 2024 martial law declaration ==
=== Background ===
After Yoon was elected president, when asked about the possibility of pressure and protests by opposition parties and citizens, Kim responded with; "Why worry about it? Just declare martial law and sweep it all away."

In March 2024, President Yoon Suk Yeol invited Kim, as well as the then-Defense Minister Shin Won-sik and National Intelligence Service Director Cho Tae-yong for dinner and reportedly expressed his intention to "declare martial law soon."

In September 2024, due to Kim's appointment as Minister of National Defense, some DPK politicians began suggesting that Yoon was preparing martial law. Several South Korean Defense Ministers have had major roles in either martial law or self-coups in the past, with the most notable examples being Song Yo-chan; who declared martial law and demanded the resignation of President Syngman Rhee, and Chung Ho-yong; who had complicity in the Gwangju Uprising.

Yoon had begun drafting the martial law decree on 24 November, by using reference to the martial law documents drafted under the leadership of the Defense Security Command during the Park Geun-hye impeachment in March 2017 and past martial law proclamations. At an unplanned cabinet meeting that Yoon convened minutes before his late-night declaration on 3 December, Kim was the one who recommended imposing martial law. Prime Minister Han Duck-soo was allegedly sidelined in the decision-making process leading up to the martial law declaration, and discussions were kept private between Yoon and Kim.

On the morning of 3 December, former Army Maj. Gen. Roh Sang-won, former chief of the Defense Intelligence Command met with Kim Yong-hyun at his official residence, for a meeting lasting 20 to 30 minutes. In the afternoon, Kim instructed Army Chief of Staff, Gen. Park An-su, and five other military officials to report to his office at 21:30. At 17:00 KST, units of the Republic of Korea Army Special Warfare Command, including the 707th Special Mission Group, 1st Special Forces Brigade, and the 13th Special Mission Brigade received orders to prepare for operations at an isolated area. The 707th SMG received a message to prepare for the conduct of a real-world operation by helicopter, and deployment on orders of Kim Yong-hyun. They were told "The situation related to North Korea is serious", though an anonymous official reported there had been no movements by the North Korean military.

=== Events ===
At 22:23 on 3 December, Yoon Suk Yeol began making his emergency address to the nation, and at 22:27, declared martial law. At 22:28, Kim then instructed DCC Commander Lieutenant General Yeo In-hyung to go ahead with the arrests of politicians on a target list, and ordered soldiers to enter the National Assembly and prevent citizens from entering the building. At 22:30, Kim addressed a video conference to all military commanders above the corps commander level and threatened officers with punishment for insubordination if they did not follow their deployment orders. Yoon appointed Chief of Staff of the Republic of Korea Army Park An-su as his martial law commander. At 00:48 on 4 December, the National Assembly commenced the emergency session to vote to end martial law. Upon finding out about the National Assembly members entering the building, Yoon called Police Commissioner General Cho Ji-ho several times and instructed him to arrest all the lawmakers trying to enter the National Assembly, stating "Bring them in. It's illegal. All the lawmakers are violating the proclamation. Arrest them." Yoon then told Commander Lee Jin-woo, "Break down the doors, even if it means shooting."

When he was notified the lawmakers had begun the session to end martial law, Yoon ordered Special Warfare Commander Kwak Jong-geun to "break down the door with an axe and go in and get them all out." Kim also ordered, "Stop the number of National Assembly members so that it is less than 150. Bring the National Assembly members out." Kim also prioritized the arrests and detention of Lee Jae-myung, Woo Won-shik, and Han Dong-hoon from the National Assembly. At 01:02, with 190 of 300 lawmakers present, they voted unanimously to lift martial law. Yoon denied the vote was legitimate at first upon finding out, and told Commander Lee, "It's not even confirmed that 190 people came in. Even if martial law was lifted, I just have to declare martial law two or three more times, so keep going."

Yoon would later hold a meeting inside the Joint Chiefs of Staff’s command and control room with Kim Yong-hyun, Martial Law Commander Park An-su, 2nd Deputy Director of the National Security Office In Sung-hwan, Defense Secretary Choi Byung-ok, and Military Advisor to the Ministry of National Defense Kim Chul-jin. Yoon would ask Kim Yong-hyun the amount of troops he deployed to the National Assembly, to which he would respond with "about 500." Yoon, irritated with Kim's response, would say; "I told you it’s not enough! You should have sent 1,000! What are we going to do now?" While searching for another method, Yoon looked for a copy of South Korea's National Assembly Act. There was reportedly no discussion about lifting martial law at that meeting. However at 04:27, during a televised briefing, Yoon announced that he would lift martial law as soon as a quorum could be obtained for a cabinet meeting, and that he had withdrawn military personnel from the National Assembly. At approximately 04:30, the cabinet approved the motion to lift martial law.

=== Aftermath ===
Rebuilding Korea Party leader Cho Kuk called the declaration of martial law "illegal" and said it met conditions for the impeachments of Yoon and Kim. Many South Korean television programs called Kim "the main character" or "ringleader" of the martial law for advising Yoon to declare it. Subsequent investigations revealed that Cho, and Seoul Metropolitan Police Agency Commissioner General Kim Bong-sik met with Minister Kim and President Yoon at 19:00, and two police officials were given a list of about 10 people to be arrested along with plans to occupy the National Assembly and National Election Commission via a martial law declaration at 22:00.

After the National Assembly filed an impeachment motion against him, Kim resigned on 5 December, for which he made an apology. "First, as defense minister, I feel deeply responsible and sorry for causing concern and confusion in regard to the martial law," he said. "All members of the armed forces involved in the implementation of the emergency martial law only did their duty at my direction. I take full responsibility for it." He also stated that he deployed troops to determine the need for an investigation into the NEC's alleged "election fraud" in the April 2024 National Assembly election, which was echoed by far-right YouTubers. However, these allegations by right-wing conspiracy theorists have been repeatedly debunked by authorities. Kim's deputy, Kim Seon-ho, also accused him of having ordered soldiers to enter the National Assembly and prevent lawmakers from gathering to vote down the declaration. The Ministry of Justice barred Kim from leaving the country following rumors that he booked a flight to flee overseas to avoid prosecution.

Yoon was impeached on 14 December by the National Assembly and suspended from office, and was arrested on 15 January 2025.

== Trial ==
=== Arrest, suicide attempt, and indictment ===
On 8 December, Kim was arrested on charges relating to the martial law declaration. A police raid was conducted at the Presidential Office, with investigators presenting a search warrant that specified Yoon as the suspect.

On 10 December, at 23:52 KST, Kim attempted to commit suicide, using his clothing to try and hang himself in the bathroom of the detention facility he was being held in while in custody. Shin Yong-hae, the head of the Ministry of Justice's Correctional Service, stated at a National Assembly plenary session; "A control room worker discovered Kim Yong-hyun attempting suicide by using string connecting his underwear and underwear pants in the bathroom of the waiting area before a warrant against him was to be issued." Shin also stated; "He gave up and came out when we immediately went in and opened the door. He is currently being housed in a protection facility and I have received reports that he is in good health."

On 27 December, Kim was indicted on insurrection charges. The indictment revealed that President Yoon met with Kim, Commander Yeo, and others about 10 times since March 2024 to discuss the imposition of martial law. Yoon ordered a nighttime curfew reference to be dropped from the decree. The indictment also revealed that the Commander of the Intelligence Command Moon Sang-ho and his predecessor Roh Sang-won intended for 30 troops to detain NEC staff and tie them up with ropes and put masks on their faces, and for them to be sent for detention due to election fraud. Evidence was found of awls, ropes, hammers, cable ties and baseball bats belonging to the arrest team to be used when carrying out the arrests.

=== Pre-trial ===
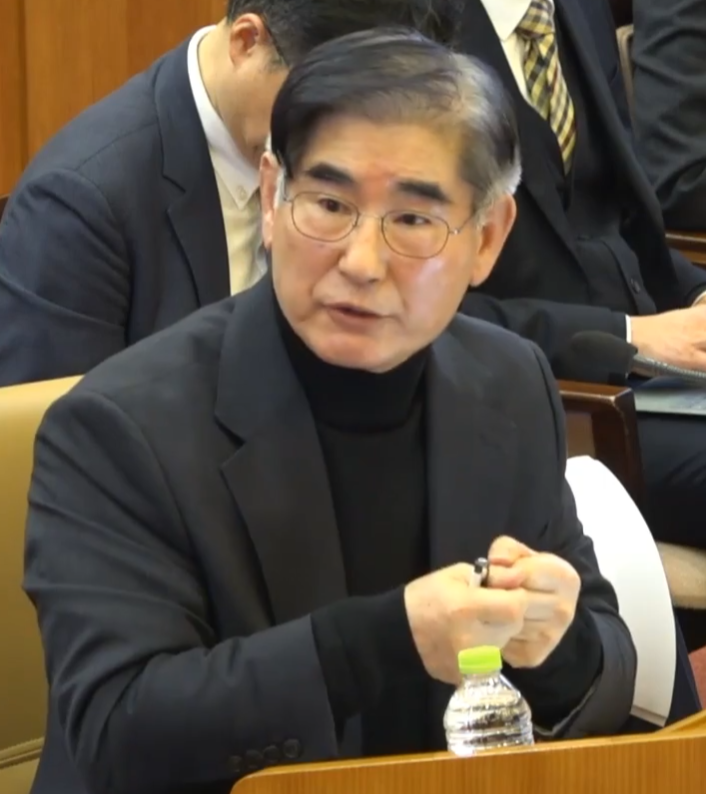
Kim testifying as a witness at Yoon's impeachment trial; 23 January 2025

On 23 January 2025, Yoon appeared at the fourth impeachment trial hearing, with Kim Yong-hyun present as a witness. Kim denied allegations that Yoon had ordered the military to storm the National Assembly to prevent lawmakers from convening and passing a resolution nullifying martial law. However, he admitted to recommending declaring martial law to Yoon and to writing a note to Finance Minister Choi Sang-mok, instructing the establishment of an emergency legislative body during martial law. Alongside Yoon, Kim was also accused of ordering lawmakers to be dragged out of the parliament, to which Kim responded with; "The situation was very chaotic, I thought someone might get crushed to death. So I said to pull them out for now to reduce the risk of serious harm. That’s what I meant."

On 5 February, the National Assembly planned an on-site questioning session at the Seoul Dongbu Detention Center, aimed to directly question key figures involved in the martial law declaration, but it was cancelled after Kim refused to cooperate. Despite his witness chair already being set up, Kim declined to appear at the session, insisting that he could not attend it due to "trial preparation." Kim had previously refused to attend any parliamentary hearings held by the special committee. Democratic party member Ahn Gyu-back apologized to the committee for Kim's behavior, and added that the committee would file a complaint against Kim for contempt of the Assembly at next week's plenary session. Democratic Party representative Han Byung-do would voice his annoyance, stating; "Refusing to cooperate with the investigation is an outright rejection of the truth. If he is so confident and honorable, why can't he stand in front of the public?" On 21 February, Kim applied for a suspension of execution in protest of the prosecution's sending of his prosecution's investigation records to the Constitutional Court, but it was rejected.

On 3 March, Kim would call Yoon's arrest "illegal and unconstitutional" in a letter he wrote in his prison cell. In the letter, Kim would also call for Constitutional Court justices Moon Hyung-bae, Lee Mison and Chung Kyesun to be "punished." Kim also criticized students at Ewha Womans University that were in favor of Yoon's impeachment, calling them "a group of evil." Democratic Party Speaker Hwang Jung-a would criticize the letter, stating "[Kim] is nothing different from Yoon, who regards anyone who criticizes him as an anti-government force and someone to be eliminated." During a court hearing on 17 March, Kim claimed his reasoning for urging Yoon to declare martial law was because he wanted to "root out anti-state forces and overcome political deadlock". Kim would also deny that the martial law declaration was an attempted self-coup.

On 4 April, the Constitutional Court unanimously upheld Yoon's impeachment and removal from office over the martial law declaration.

On 27 May, former Prime Minister and Acting President Han Duck-soo and former Finance Minister Choi Sang-mok were barred from traveling abroad after being named as a suspect in the insurrection case against Yoon Suk Yeol over his martial law declaration, after CC-TV footage of Han conversing with Kim Yong-hyun the day of the martial law declaration was discovered. On 28 May, former Commander of the Defense Intelligence Command Roh Sang-won was indicted on bribery charges, which revealed that he, along with Kim Yong-hyun, were accepting bribes and valuables back in August 2024 from active-duty soldiers under the pretext of requesting promotions.

=== Proceedings ===
Kim Yong-hyun's trial began on 27 March, with a total of six witness examinations. Kim's trial is being shared along with former commander Roh Sang-won and former military police commander of the 3rd Field Army Command Kim Yong-gun, both who had ties with Kim during the martial law order. Over the following two months, five more hearings were held with the three, however these hearings were kept private as they were charged in connection with key insurrection-related duties. The fifth hearing was scheduled for 23 May. On 28 May, Judge Ji Gwi-yeon, who was assigned the trial case, announced that Kim's trial would now be publicized; "to ensure transparency and uphold the rule of law in handling serious charges such as insurrection." On 4 June, Kim submitted a withdrawal request to the court, however he withdrew it later that day.

On 9 June, the South Korean District Court announced they were considering additionally charging Kim, along with former Army Intelligence Command Chief Roh Sang-won, with tampering with evidence after it was discovered that on 5 December 2024, Roh gave Kim a secret burner cellphone device, who initialized it before returning it to Roh. It was also discovered that Kim continued to use a different burner cellphone until his arrest. Prosecutors believe Roh and Kim may have used these devices to contact prosecution officials. They were also considering indicting Kim on suspicion of bribery, illegal provision of a secret cellphone, and suspicion of military blacklist; as well as threats of violence for ordering court justices to be "punished" in a prison letter he wrote in March. The court also confirmed that Kim was indeed second-in-command of the martial law order.

On 14 June, the court decided they were going to offer to release Kim on bail of 100 million won and a written pledge to not destroy evidence or flee overseas. Under South Korean law, Kim's detention period would expire on 27 June, six months after his indictment. He would be free without any restrictions if the court released him after the detention period expired, with his detention period only being extended if he was additionally indicted on other charges. Upon release, Kim would be prohibited from meeting or communicating with people involved in the martial law case, from leaving his home address, and from using cellphone devices or email. If said restrictions were violated, Kim would be re-arrested. On 16 June, Kim rejected the bail offer and filed an appeal to the court. He argued that conditional release against his will right before the expiration of the detention period was "effectively another form of detention that restricts personal freedom." On 19 June, Special Prosecutor Cho Eun-seok received investigation records regarding suspicion of obstruction of justice and tampering with evidence. As a result, Cho additionally indicted Kim on the two charges, a decision Kim claimed was "illegal." The court decided to give Kim a separate trial for these charges, and that its first hearing would be held on 17 July.

On 17 July, the first hearing for Kim's additional trial began, however it only lasted twenty minutes because Kim refused to respond when asked if he would like to have a citizen participation trial. On 11 August, former Minister of the Interior and Safety Lee Sang-min testified as a witness, without Kim present. On the same day, Kim filed a request to cancel his detention with the court handling the additional indictments, as well as a transfer of jurisdiction, requesting that the case be tried in a different court.

In September, the court publicly announced that the insurrection trial should conclude by the end of the year. On 18 September, Kim filed a recusal application in an attempt to drop all of the charges filed against him, which was rejected. On 17 October, Kim filed a lawsuit against the court, claiming that "the act of sending the investigation records to the Constitutional Court is an unconstitutional and illegal act without legal basis," and requested a stay of execution. This was also rejected due to lack of sufficient legal standing. On 11 November, Kim was fined 5 million won and, along with Yoon Suk Yeol and Lee Sang-min, was issued an arrest warrant for failing to appear at Han Duck-soo's trial as a witness.

On 19 February 2026, Kim was convicted and sentenced to 30 years in prison for his role in planning and participating in an insurrection. On 19 May, Kim was additionally sentenced to 3 years imprisonment for destruction of evidence after the martial law attempt and obstruction of official duties by deception. On 12 June 2026, Kim was found guilty of treason and abuse of power for participating in operations to send drones to be flown into North Korea, to provoke North Korea and help justify Yoon's martial law declaration, and sentenced to 30 years imprisonment. On 19 June, he was also found guilty of leaking a list of military intelligence personnel to former Defense Intelligence Command chief Noh Sang-won and sentenced to 3 years in prison.

Military offices
Preceded by Shin Won-sik	Minister of National Defense; 6 September 2024 – 5 December 2024	Succeeded by Kim Seon-ho
