= Chungam High School =

High school in Seoul, South Korea

Coordinates: 37.5848518°N 126.9212301°E

- 충암고등학교

Location
- Eunpyeong District, Seoul; South Korea

Information
- Type: Private
- Motto: Sincerity, Diligence
- Established: 1969
- School district: Seoul Metropolitan Office of Education
- Principal: Lee Yoon-chan
- Staff: 89 (2023-2024)
- Enrollment: 1,098 (2023-2024)
- Affiliation: Chungam Academy
- Website: cham.sen.hs.kr

Chungam High School (Korean: 충암고등학교; Hanja: 冲岩高等學校) is a private all-boys high school located in Eungam-dong, Eunpyeong District, Seoul, South Korea.

== History ==
On 1 February 1965, educator Lee In-gwan initiated the establishment of "Chungam Academy." On 30 April, the school building was constructed. The academy received official approval on 10 November 1965, with Jeong Jae-geum, Lee's wife, appointed as the first chairperson of the board. The school officially opened its doors on 2 March 1969, enrolling 240 first-year students with Lee In-gwan as the principal.

In 1973, the institution officially renamed the school from "Chungam Academy" to "Chungam High School." Over the years, it expanded its academic offerings, including the addition of evening classes in 1974. By 1986, the school operated 45 daytime and 36 evening classes. As of May 2024, Chungam High School has an enrollment of 1,098 students and a faculty of 89 members.

On 10 May 2022, a fellow graduate of the alma mater, Yoon Suk Yeol, was elected as president of South Korea. Following his inauguration, Chungam High School's website nicknamed Yoon "The Son of Chungam." Yoon would later form a faction full of Chungam High School alumni within the military and government known as the Chungam Faction.

On 3 December 2024, Yoon declared emergency martial law during a televised address. Kim Yong-hyun, the Minister of National Defense and another fellow graduate of the alma mater, urged him to do so in a last-minute cabinet meeting and played a major role in the declaration. The Chungam Faction also had a major role, which led to speculations that the faction indicated Yoon's ulterior motive for a self-coup. As a result, the alma mater announced that students are not to be mandated to wear their uniforms to school until graduation in an attempt to protect them from public backlash. They also confirmed they had no association with the declaration as well as the Chungam Faction. The chair of the Chungam High School Foundation called Yoon and Kim "shameful graduates". The martial law was lifted by the National Assembly only six hours later. As a result of the martial law declaration, Yoon was impeached on 14 December and was removed from office on 4 April 2025.

== Notable alumni ==
- An Young-gil - professional Go player
- Byeon Jin-su - professional baseball pitcher
- Cha In-pyo - actor and director
- Cho Bum-hyun - manager of the KT Wiz from 2014 to 2016
- Cho Han-seung - professional Go player
- Hak-ju Lee - professional baseball shortstop
- Heo Young-ho - professional Go player
- Hong Min-pyo - professional Go player
- Hong Sang-sam - professional baseball pitcher for the Doosan Bears of the KBO League
- Kang Yoo-taek - professional Go player
- Kim Dong-hee - professional Go player
- Kim Hyun-chul - comedian
- Kim Jin-woo - actor and singer
- Kim Myung-min - actor
- Kim Yong-hyun - 49th Minister of National Defense of South Korea
- Kwak Jong-geun - 32nd Chief of the Army Special Warfare Command of South Korea
- Lee Chang-ho - professional Go player
- Lee Hwi-jae - TV presenter, comedian, actor, and singer
- Lee Jae-kyoo - television and film director
- Lee Jin-woo - 37th Commander of the Capital Defense Command of South Korea
- Lee Sang-min - 4th Minister of the Interior and Safety of South Korea
- Lee Tae-won - professional baseball catcher for the NC Dinos in the KBO League
- Moon Sung-hyun - professional baseball pitcher for the Kiwoom Heroes in the KBO League
- Na Tae-ju - actor, singer, and martial artist
- Park Jong-seon - commander of the Defense Security Agency of the Defense Intelligence Agency of South Korea
- Park Jung-sang - professional Go player
- Park Junghwan - professional Go player
- Park Sung-ha - Director of the Planning and Management Office of the Counterintelligence Command of South Korea
- Park Yeong-hun - professional Go player
- Ryu Ji-hyuk - professional baseball infielder for the Samsung Lions of the KBO League
- Song Tae-kon - professional Go player
- Tak Jae-hoon - singer, actor and entertainer
- Woo-suk Go - professional baseball pitcher
- Won Seong-jin - professional Go player
- Yeo In-hyung - Commander of the Defense Counterintelligence Command of South Korea from 2023 to 2025
- Yoo Chang-hyuk - professional Go player
- Yoon Na-moo - actor
- Yoon Sang - composer, record producer, singer and songwriter
- Yoon Suk Yeol - 13th President of South Korea from 2022 to 2025
- Yoon Yo-seop - coach for the KT Wiz of the KBO League
- Yu Jae-yu - professional baseball pitcher
- Yun Jun-sang - professional Go player
