= Yeo In-hyung =

South Korean lieutenant general (born 1969)

- 여인형
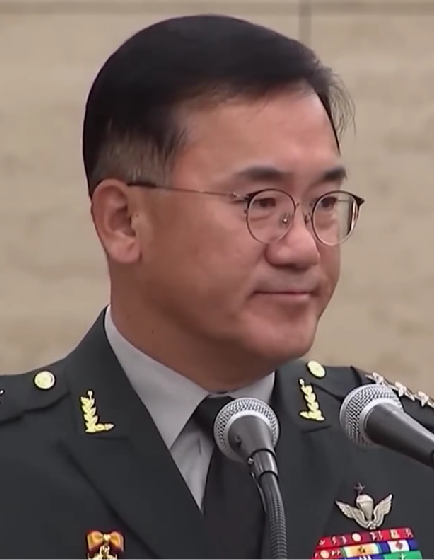
- Yeo in 2024

Commander of Defense Counterintelligence Command
- In office early 2023 – 14 December 2024
- Preceded by: Lt. Gen Kim Jae-hwan
- Succeeded by: Position Abolished

Personal details
- Born: 1969 (age 56–57) North Gyeongsang Province, South Korea
- Other political affiliations: Chungam Faction (2022-2025)
- Children: 2
- Education: Chungam High School; Korea Military Academy

Military service
- Branch/service: Republic of Korea Army
- Years of service: 1992-2025
- Rank: Lieutenant general
- Criminal information
- Movement: 2024 martial law
- Status: Imprisoned
- Convictions: Abuse of power; Treason; Insurrection; Deprivation of rights under the color of law
- Penalty: Abuse of power and treason: 15 years imprisonment; Insurrection and deprivation of rights under the color of law: 18 years imprisonment

Details
- Date apprehended: 14 December 2024

Korean name
- Hangul: 여인형
- Hanja: 呂寅兄
- RR: Yeo Inhyeong
- MR: Yŏ Inhyŏng

Yeo In-hyung (Korean: 여인형; born 1969) is a South Korean former three-star army lieutenant general who served as the Commander of the Defense Counterintelligence Command from 2023 to 2024. Yeo has served in the Republic of Korea Army since 1992. He is widely known for his role in the 2024 martial law crisis.

In 2023, Yeo became a heavily controversial figure within the military and government, as he idolized former dictator Chun Doo-hwan and his successor Roh Tae-woo. That, and the fact that Yeo held gatherings in private settings with key military figures who graduated from he and President Yoon Suk Yeol's alma mater, Chungam High School, led to rumors that Yeo's appointment as Defense Counterintelligence Commander was a part of a potential strategy to center the military around President Yoon's personal agenda.

On 3 December 2024, President Yoon ultimately declared emergency martial law across the nation. Following the declaration, Yeo gave the National Intelligence Service a list of individuals that he, President Yoon, and Minister of National Defense Kim Yong-hyun wanted arrested. Yeo then ordered several operatives from the Intelligence Protection Group of the Defense Security Command to raid the server room located on the second floor of the National Election Commission headquarters. The martial law order was lifted by the National Assembly only a few hours later.

After the martial law order was lifted, Yeo's Defense Counterintelligence Commander duties were suspended by the Ministry of Justice. On 14 December, Yeo was arrested for his role in the declaration on charges of insurrection, obstruction of justice, and abuse of power. On 6 February 2025, a leave of absence from prosecution was issued against Yeo by the military for his imprisonment. His trial began on 8 July, where he confessed to the charges of leading an insurrection and abuse of power, but not obstruction of justice, claiming to have heavily regretted his involvement in the declaration. Yeo likely faces either life imprisonment or the death penalty if found guilty on all counts.

== Life and education ==
Yeo In-hyung was born in 1969 in North Gyeongsang Province, South Korea. He and future-Capital Defense Commander Lee Jin-woo both graduated Chungam High School in 1988, and they both entered the Korea Military Academy shortly thereafter. They both graduated the academy's 48th class in 1992, where they served in the Republic of Korea Army until 2025. Yeo was temporarily placed on leave while Lee was dishonorably discharged.

Yeo allegedly met and became friends with future-Minister of National Defense Kim Yong-hyun shortly after graduating the military academy. This likely was what led to Yeo becoming a member of the Chungam Faction decades later in 2022.

== Career ==
In December 2019, Yeo was promoted to brigadier general. In December 2022, he was appointed as the Joint Chiefs of Staff's Chief Directorate of Operations. In November 2023, He was promoted to lieutenant general and appointed as Defense Counterintelligence Commander.

In October 2024, Yeo hung up pictures of Chun Doo-hwan and Roh Tae-woo in the hallway of the Counterintelligence Agency's headquarters, a decision met with much controversy. Choo Mi-ae stated; "Unless the Counterintelligence Agency is nostalgic for the days of the Security Command in the 1980s, the pictures should be removed immediately."

Yeo was dismissed from the Army on 29 December 2025.

== Involvement in the 2024 martial law crisis ==
=== Early planning of martial law ===
In late December 2023, Yoon allegedly first mentioned "taking emergency action" to address "difficult social issues" in referring to martial law. At the end of March 2024, the then-Defense Minister Shin Won-sik, concerned about the implementation of martial law, called Kim Yong-hyun and Yeo in private to discuss blocking a potential martial law order. Investigations revealed that Yoon met with Kim Yong-hyun, Yeo, and others about 10 times since March 2024 to discuss the imposition of martial law. The three started mentioning martial law more often following the PPP's defeat in the April 2024 legislative election. Eventually, Shin was shuffled out of the role of Defense Minister to become Director of the Office of National Security, while Kim Yong-hyun was selected to replace Shin in September 2024.

During Kim's confirmation hearing on 2 September 2024, Kim Yong-hyun would be questioned by Representative Choo Mi-ae about his ties with Yeo, as they both attended Chungam High School. She would point out that Yeo had received numerous promotions during Yoon's term, stating; "General Yeo In-hyung is being promoted too quickly. He will probably reach full general rank by the end of Yoon Suk Yeol's term." Choo then asked Kim if Yeo's constant promotions were part of a strategy to center the military around Yoon's personal agenda, which Kim denied.

Choo also alleged that Yoon appointing Kim as Defense Minister after appointing Yeo as Defense Counterintelligence Commander was part of a potential imposition of martial law, claiming that the idea of two graduates of the same alma mater serving as Defense Minister and Defense Counterintelligence Commander was suspicious, and that such an occurrence "has never happened before." Kim disagreed, claiming; "In the past, there have been cases where the Defense Minister and Defense Counterintelligence Commander were from the same high school."

In November 2024, the DCC had prepared documents and other related material on declaring martial law following orders from Yeo.

=== Events ===
On 3 December 2024, at 22:27, Yoon declared emergency martial law across the nation during a televised address. In his declaration, Yoon accused the Democratic Party (DPK), which has a majority in the National Assembly, of conducting "anti-state activities" and collaborating with "North Korean communists" to destroy the country, thereby creating a "legislative dictatorship". The order prohibited political activities, including gatherings of the National Assembly and local legislatures, and suspended the free press.

Following the declaration, at 22:28, Yeo later gave National Intelligence Service (NIS) Deputy Director Hong Jang-won a list of individuals targeted for arrest which Hong could not recall completely:

- Democratic Party leader Lee Jae Myung
- National Assembly Speaker Woo Won-shik
- People Power Party leader Han Dong-hoon
- Democratic Party Rep. Kim Min-seok
- Democratic Party floor leader Park Chan-dae
- National Assembly Legislation and Judiciary Committee Chair Jung Chung-rae
- Rebuilding Korea Party leader Cho Kuk
- Liberal journalist Kim Ou-joon
- Former Supreme Court Chief Justice Kim Myeong-su
- Kim Min-woong, brother of Rep. Kim Min-seok and leader of the Candlelight Movement
- Former National Election Commission (NEC) Chairman Kwon Soon-il

Yeo reportedly outlined plans to arrest first and second-tier targets in phases, detain them at DCC facilities, and conduct investigations.

Soon after, several operatives from the Intelligence Protection Group of the DCC with firearms and uniforms that were missing unit insignias and patches raided the server room located on the second floor of the NEC headquarters while the Special Warfare Command troops and National Police officers from Gyeonggi Nambu Provincial Police Agency provided perimeter security at the building. Yeo was later revealed to have been behind the raid. Yeo made a call to KNP Commissioner Cho Ji-ho about the NEC headquarters raid and Cho started supplying police forces for the troops.

The National Assembly commenced the emergency session at 00:48 on 4 December. At 01:02, with 190 of 300 lawmakers present, they voted unanimously to lift martial law. Once the martial law order was lifted, Yeo requested the DCC to "destroy a series of documents" related to the declaration, which was rejected.

== Trial ==
=== Pre-trial ===
During prosecution questioning, Yeo denied having any involvement in the declaration. On 6 December, following subsequent investigations, Yeo's Defense Counterintelligence Commander duties were suspended by the Ministry of Justice. He was additionally travel barred the same day, following rumors he planned to destroy evidence before fleeing the country.

On 9 December, Police Commissioner Cho testified before the Judiciary Committee of the National Assembly that he had received a call from DCC Commander Yeo sometime between 22:30 and 22:40 on 3 December, asking him to track the locations of politicians and others to carry out their arrests. The list of targets was consistent with what NIS Deputy Director Hong had revealed the previous week, except PPP leader Han Dong-hoon was added to the list later. Commissioner Cho stated that he ignored the orders, on grounds that location tracking itself was illegal and that court-issued arrest warrants were required to carry out arrests.

On 14 December, Yeo was arrested for his role in the declaration on charges of insurrection, obstruction of justice, and abuse of power. On 6 February 2025, a leave of absence from prosecution was issued against Yeo. On 30 June, an additional arrest warrant was issued by the Central District Military Court.

=== Proceedings ===
Yeo's trial began on 8 July, along with former Army Intelligence Command commander Moon Sang-ho. When the trial started, Yeo immediately confessed to the charges of leading an insurrection and abuse of power, but not obstruction of justice. He then claimed to have heavily regretted his involvement in the declaration, stating that if he could go back in time, he would disobey Yoon and Kim's orders even if it meant resigning from his position; "Looking back, I truly regret it. I never once thought that my judgment and actions after the declaration of martial law were free from responsibility, and I still believe that I must take full responsibility for my actions. I will forgo additional witness testimony in the upcoming trial."

On 27 August, it was discovered by prosecutors that sometime in early 2024, Yeo invited Ahn Sung-sik, a former planning and coordination officer at the Korea Coast Guard who attended Chungam High School with Yeo, to meet up with him and two other members of the Chungam Faction to have dinner. The conversations Ahn had with Yeo and the two faction members were never disclosed to the public.

On 9 September, Yeo was summoned by the Special Prosecutor's Office for Internal Rebellion and questioned as a witness in connection with National Intelligence Service Director Cho Tae-yong.

=== Sentence ===
On 12 June 2026, Yeo was found guilty of treason and abuse of power for participating in operations to send drones to be flown into North Korea, to provoke North Korea and help justify Yoon's martial law declaration, and sentenced to 15 years imprisonment.
