= Faction =

Group within a political party

A faction is a group of people with a common political purpose. More specifically, political faction denotes a subgroup of a political party, where the former may be distinguished by having one or more opinions or interests that differ from the latter's. Intra-party conflict between factions can lead to schism of the party into two or more political parties. The ley de lemas electoral system allows voters to indicate on the ballot their support for a specific faction of their preference within a political party. Political factions can represent voting blocs. Political factions require a weaker party discipline. Research indicates that factions can play an important role in moving their host party along the ideological spectrum.

== George Washington's Farewell Address ==
The first president of the United States, George Washington, warned of political factions in his famous farewell address from 1796. He warned of political parties generally, as according to Washington, political party loyalty when prioritized over duty to the nation and commitment to principles, was considered to be a major threat to the survival of a democratic constitutional republic:

Without looking forward to an extremity of this kind (which nevertheless ought not to be entirely out of sight), the common and continual mischiefs of the spirit of party are sufficient to make it the interest and duty of a wise people to discourage and restrain it [the formation and loyalty to partisan interests, over loyalty to principles or one's country].

== By country ==
=== Argentina ===
- Factions in the Justicialist Party
  - Kirchnerism
  - Federal Peronism
  - Orthodox Peronism
  - Menemism
  - Tendencia Revolucionaria
- Factions in the Radical Civic Union:
  - Radicales K

=== Australia ===
- Factions in the Australian Labor Party
  - Labor Left
  - Labor Right
- Factions in the Liberal Party of Australia
  - Moderates
  - Centre Right
  - National Right

=== France ===
- Factions in the Socialist Party (France)

=== Italy ===
- Factions in the Communist Refoundation Party
- Factions in the Democratic Party (Italy)
- Factions in Forza Italia
- Factions in The People of Freedom

=== Japan ===
- Factions in the Liberal Democratic Party (Japan)

=== Russia/Soviet Union ===
- Factions of the Russian Social Democratic Labour Party
- List of Oppositions in the Communist Party of the Soviet Union

=== South Korea ===
- Chilseonghoe
- Hanahoe
- Chungam

=== United Kingdom ===
- List of organisations associated with the Conservative Party (UK)
- List of organisations associated with the Labour Party (UK)

=== United States ===
- Factions in the Democratic Party (United States)
- Factions in the Republican Party (United States)
- Factions in the Libertarian Party (United States)

== See also ==
- Ginger group, formal or informal group within an organisation seeking to influence its direction and activity
- Partisan (politics)
