= Lee Jin-woo (general) =

South Korean former lieutenant general (born 1970)

- 이진우
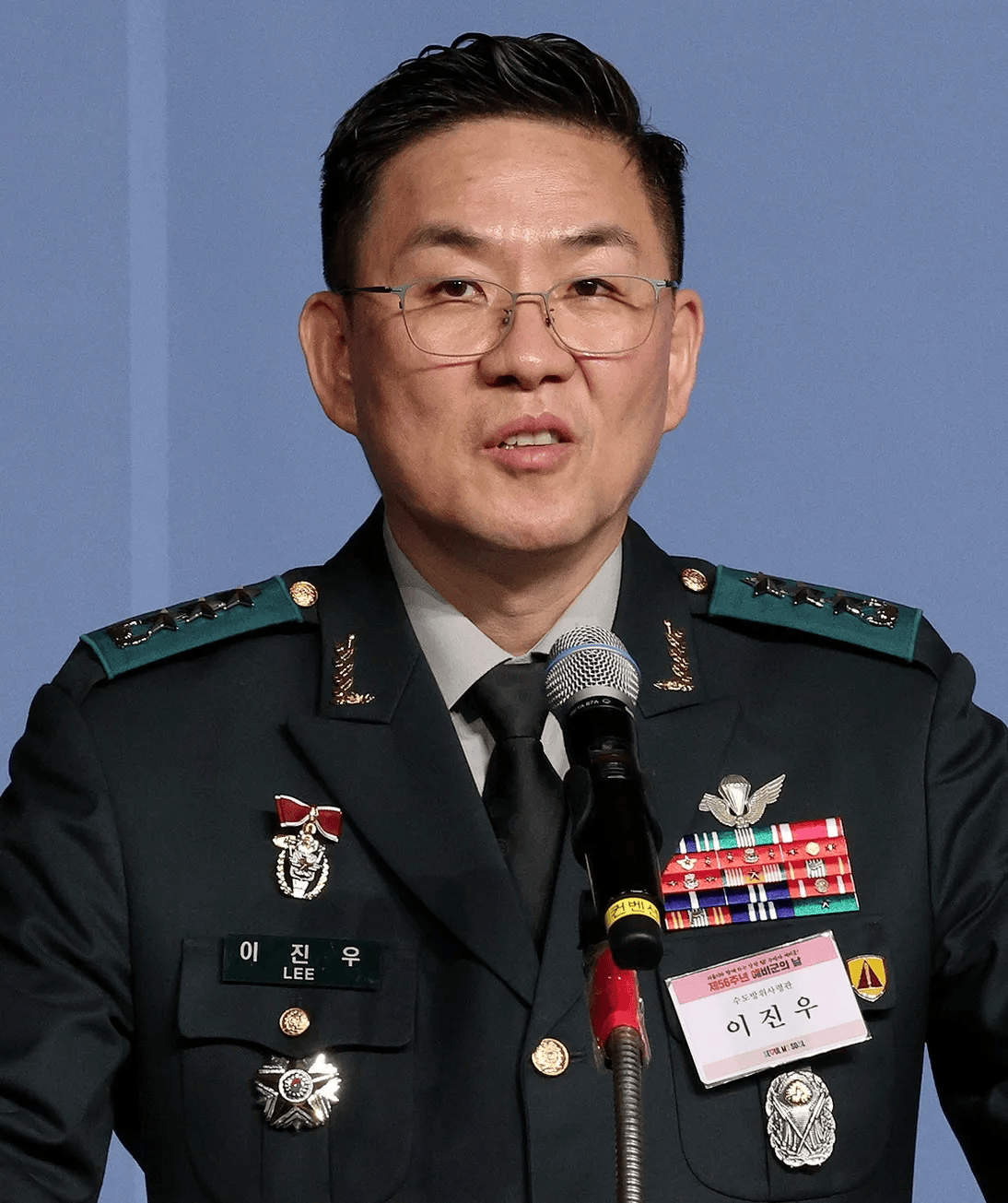
- Lee in 2024

Personal details
- Born: 1970 (age 55–56) Seoul, South Korea
- Other political affiliations: Chungam Faction (since 2022)
- Parent: Lee Gyu-hwan (father)
- Education: Chungam High School; Korea Military Academy

Military service
- Branch/service: Republic of Korea Army
- Years of service: 1992–2025
- Rank: Lieutenant general

Korean name
- Hangul: 이진우
- Hanja: 李鎭雨
- RR: I Jinu
- MR: I Chinu

Lee Jin-woo (Korean: 이진우; born 1970) is a South Korean former three-star army lieutenant general who served as the 37th Commander of the Capital Defense Command from 2023 to 2025. Lee served in the Republic of Korea Army from 1992 until he was dishonorably discharged in 2025. He is widely known for his role in the 2024 martial law crisis.

On 3 December 2024, President Yoon declared emergency martial law during a televised address. Yoon ordered Lee and Special Warfare Commander Chief Kwak Jong-geun to seize the legislature in an attempt to prevent lawmakers from voting down the declaration. Despite this, 190 lawmakers managed to make it into the National Assembly where they voted unanimously to lift the martial law. Yoon lifted the martial law a few hours later.

On 6 December, Lee's duties were temporarily suspended by the Ministry of Justice when his role in the declaration was discovered. On 13 December, Lee was arrested for his involvement, removed from his post on 20 January 2025 and he was dishonorably discharged from the military on 29 December 2025.

== Life and education ==
Lee Jin-woo was born in 1970 in Seoul, South Korea. His father was Lee Gyu-hwan, a lieutenant general who graduated the Korea Military Academy's 21st class. He and future-Defense Counterintelligence Commander Yeo In-hyung both graduated Chungam High School in 1988, and entered the Korea Military Academy shortly thereafter. They both graduated the academy's 48th class in 1992, where they served in the Republic of Korea Army until 2025. Lee was dishonorably discharged while Yeo was placed on leave.

Lee became good friends with Yoon Suk Yeol, sometime during Yoon's tenure as prosecutor general. Since Lee graduated from Chungam High School, he became a member of the Chungam Faction soon after Yoon became president.

== Career ==
Lee began serving in the Republic of Korea Army in 1992. He was promoted to colonel in 2014, and to brigadier general in 2018. He was promoted to lieutenant general in November 2023, along with Yeo In-hyung and Kwak Jong-geun.

== Involvement in the 2024 martial law crisis ==
On 3 December 2024, Yoon declared emergency martial law across the nation during a televised address. In his declaration, Yoon accused the Democratic Party (DPK), which has a majority in the National Assembly, of conducting "anti-state activities" and collaborating with "North Korean communists" to destroy the country, thereby creating a "legislative dictatorship". The order prohibited political activities, including gatherings of the National Assembly and local legislatures, and suspended the free press.

The declaration was opposed by both parties and resulted in protests. At 01:02 on 4 December, 190 legislators who had arrived at the National Assembly Proceeding Hall unanimously passed a motion to lift martial law, despite attempts by the Republic of Korea Army Special Warfare Command to prevent the vote.

Subsequent investigations revealed that President Yoon ordered Lee and Kwak Jong-keun to break through the plenary chamber doors to drag the lawmakers out at 00:40 to 00:50 hours, which was too late as the lawmakers had begun the session to end martial law at that time. In the indictment of Kim Yong-hyun on 27 December by the special prosecution team, it also revealed Yoon told Commander Lee; "Break down the doors, even if it means shooting." Upon finding out about the National Assembly vote being passed, Yoon denied it was legitimate at first, and told Commander Lee, "It's not even confirmed that 190 people came in. Even if martial law was lifted, I just have to declare martial law two or three more times, so keep going."

At 04:30, Yoon and his cabinet lifted martial law and soon disbanded the Martial Law Command. The opposition subsequently began impeachment proceedings against Yoon and said it would continue to do so if he did not resign. On 6 December, Lee's Capital Defense Command commander duties were suspended by the Ministry of Justice. He was travel barred on 9 December by the National Police Agency's National Investigation Headquarters' Emergency Martial Law Special Investigation Unit, along with Kwak Jong-geun.

On 13 December, Lee was arrested for his role in the declaration. Lee was officially removed from his post on 20 January 2025, and dishonorably discharged from the military on 29 December 2025.
