= Chung Ho-yong =

South Korean general (1932–2026)

- 정호용
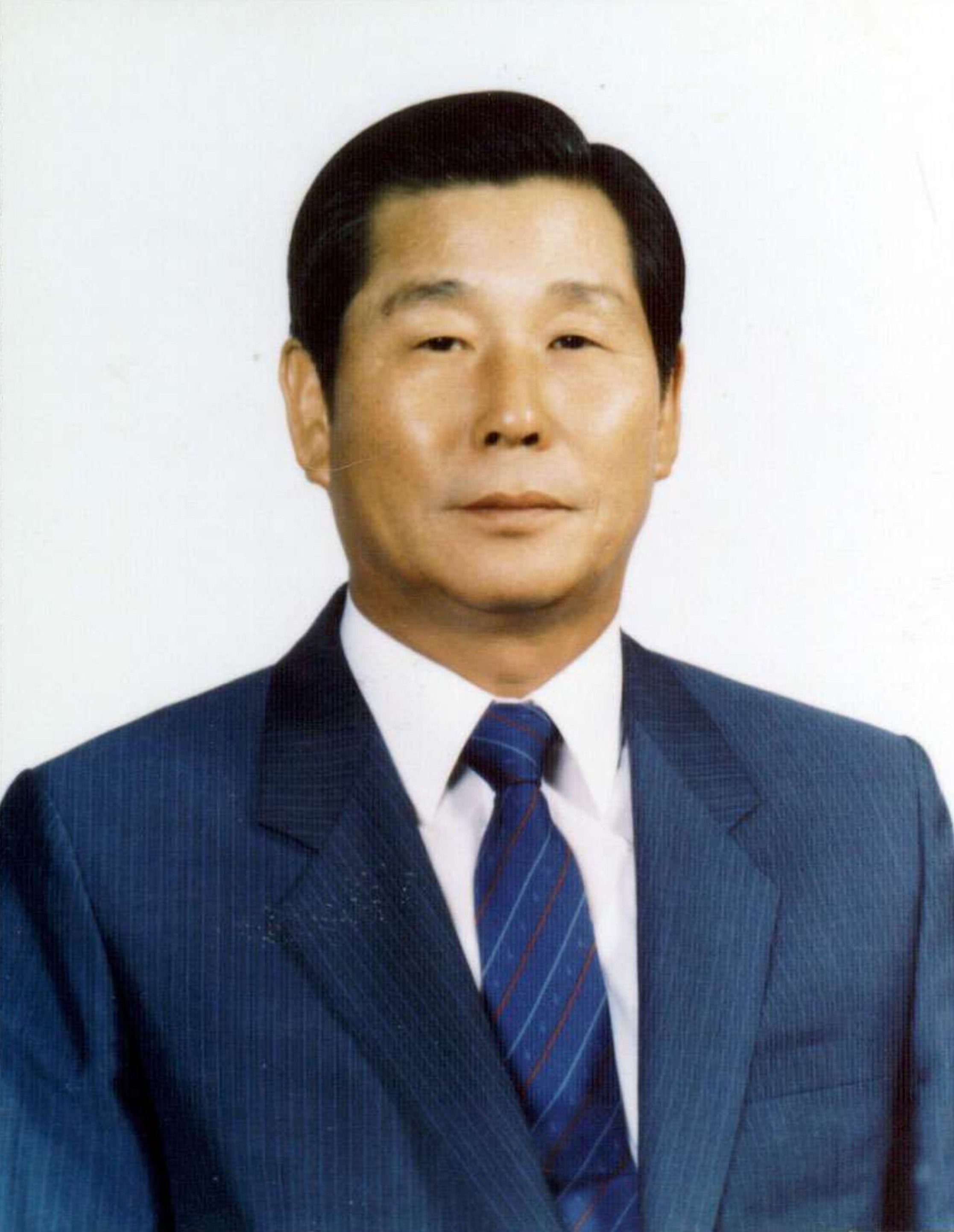
- Chung in 1987

Minister of National Defense
- In office 14 July 1987 – 25 February 1988
- President: Chun Doo-hwan
- Preceded by: Lee Ki-paik
- Succeeded by: Oh Ja-bok

Minister of Home Affairs
- In office 21 January 1987 – 25 May 1987
- President: Chun Doo-hwan
- Preceded by: Kim Chong-hoh
- Succeeded by: Goh Kun

Personal details
- Born: 10 September 1932 Taegu, Keishōhoku Province, Korea, Empire of Japan
- Died: 13 September 2026 (aged 94) Suwon, Gyeonggi Province, South Korea
- Spouse: Kim Suk-hwan
- Political party: Democratic Justice

Military service
- Branch/service: Republic of Korea Army
- Years of service: 1951–1985
- Rank: Daejang
- Battles/wars: Korean War; Vietnam War; 1979 South Korean coup d'état Gwangju Uprising
- Units: 9th Infantry Division; 50th infantry Division; Republic of Korea Army Special Warfare Command; 3rd Army

- Chung Ho-yong
- Hangul: 정호용
- Hanja: 鄭鎬溶
- RR: Jeong Hoyong
- MR: Chŏng Hoyong

Art name
- Hangul: 목우
- Hanja: 牧牛
- RR: Moku
- MR: Mogu

General Chung Ho-yong (Korean: 정호용; Hanja: 鄭鎬溶; 10 September 1932 – 13 September 2026) was a South Korean politician and army general, who held the positions of minister of home affairs and later minister of defense. He was considered one of the closest allies of Chun Doo-hwan and Roh Tae-woo, who both served as President of South Korea.

In January 1996, Chung was tried for his complicity in the brutal suppression of the Gwangju Uprising. Later that year, he was found guilty of treason. The prosecution requested a life sentence, but Chung instead received a 10-year sentence. In December 1997, Chung was released from prison after being pardoned by President Kim Young-sam.

== Early life and education ==
Chung was born in Daegu on 10 September 1932. After graduating from Kyungbock High School in 1951, he volunteered in the Republic of Korea Army during the Korean War and then enrolled in the Korea Military Academy's 11th class, where he was a classmate of future presidents Chun Doo-hwan and Roh Tae-woo. He graduated in 1955 and was appointed as an army officer. In 1999, he graduated from Konkuk University with a doctorate in economics.

== Military career ==
Chung served in the 9th Infantry Division during the Vietnam War. Using his early ties to the Hanahoe private military organization, Chung was able to climb the ranks of the South Korean military, being appointed commander of the 50th Infantry Division. He commanded the unit during the 1979 South Korean coup d'état, led by Chun Doo-hwan. One day after the coup, he was appointed commander of the Republic of Korea Army Special Warfare Command, after his predecessor, Jeong Byung-ju, was arrested for resisting Chun's forces. He became one of five central figures of the new junta, alongside Chun, Roh Tae-woo, Lee Hui-seong, and Hwang Yeong-si.

The following year, the 3rd, 7th, and 11th Special Forces Airborne Brigades, which were under Chung's command, were moved into Gwangju. On 17 May 1980, he advocated for the expansion of martial law during a meeting of military commanders, resulting in a ban on all political activities and the closure of universities. The following day, students rebelled against the decision to expand martial law in what became the Gwangju Uprising. The airborne brigades responded to the uprising with deadly force. Chung claimed that he did not command the airborne units, which were put under a local commander at the time; however, his later trial found that while command of the units was indeed localized, Chung still played a role in the suppression of the uprising. He had also visited Gwangju four times between 20 and 27 May, spending a total of 81 hours there.

He was promoted to general in 1981, and served as deputy chief of the Army Staff and commander of the 3rd Field Army. In 1983, he was appointed as the 25th Army Chief of Staff. He retired from the military as a four-star general in 1985.

== Political career ==
In 1987, under Chun Doo-hwan's administration, he successively served as minister of home affairs and minister of defense. The following year, he was elected to the National Assembly as a member of the Democratic Justice Party in Seo-gu Gap, Daegu, during the 1988 legislative election, but resigned the following year due to public opinion turning against figures of the Fifth Republic of Korea. He was elected for the same constituency as an independent politician in the 1992 legislative election.

Chung later served as chairman of the Korea Military Academy Development Fund and president of the Special Warfare Command Veterans Association. During the 2025 presidential election, People Power Party candidate Kim Moon-soo appointed Chung as an advisor to his campaign committee, but revoked the appointment five hours later due to widespread criticism over his association with the repressive military dictatorship of South Korea's Fifth Republic.

== Trial ==
Under the government of Kim Young-sam, South Korea launched an investigation into the 1979 coup d'état and Gwangju Uprising. Chung was indicted for his role in the events in 1996. He was initially sentenced to 10 years in prison by the first trial court in August 1996, however it ruled that he was not guilty of the charge of murder for the purpose of civil war. The following year, an appeals court found him guilty on the charge along with internal conspiracy and sentenced him to seven years in prison. His sentence was confirmed by the Supreme Court of Korea on 17 April 1997, which ruled that he had provided military and administrative support for the airborne brigades during the uprising. In December 1997, he was granted a presidential pardon alongside Chun Doo-hwan and Roh Tae-woo.

== Death ==
Chung died on 13 September 2026, three days after his 94th birthday, while receiving treatment at the Ajou University Hospital in Suwon after his health deteriorated. A funeral altar was set up at the hospital after his death.

Political offices
Preceded by Kim Jong-ho	Interior Minister of South Korea; January 1987 – May 1987	Succeeded by Goh Kun
Preceded by Lee Ki-baek	Defense Minister of South Korea; July 1987 – December 1988	Succeeded by Oh Ja-bok
