= Naneun Ggomsuda =

Korean political podcast

- Genre: Politics of South Korea
- Language: Korean

Cast and voices
- Hosted by: Kim Ou-joon, Chung Bong-ju, Choo Chin-woo, Kim Yong-min

Publication
- Original release: April 27, 2011 – December 18, 2012
- Updates: Weekly Updates

Related

Korean name
- Hangul: 나는 꼼수다
- RR: Naneun kkomsuda
- MR: Nanŭn kkomsuda

Naneun Ggomsuda (Korean: 나는 꼼수다), also known as Naggomsu (나꼼수) or in English as I'm a weasel is a popular South Korean political podcast under the internet newspaper, Ddanzi Ilbo. Naneun Ggomsuda is famous for lampooning the South Korean president, Lee Myung-bak. The hosts of Naneun Ggomsuda humorously call Lee Myung-bak as His Excellency or Gaka (각하) in Korean as a sarcastic title. They have also made a satire song (based on a Christian hymn, Nearer, My God, to Thee) about Lee's disputes on his Naegok-dong property purchase. Kim Ou-joon (김어준) was the original creator of Naneun Ggomsuda and currently runs Papa is (파파이스) and News factory.

== Political Culture ==
- The third son of former president Kim Dae-jung, Kim Hong-geol, comically cited a joke from Naneun Ggomsuda in which the criminal charge against the former anchor of Naneun Ggomsuda, Chung Bong-ju, was explained as "in order to prepare for Lee Myung-bak's prison life" during the publication and charity event for Lee Seo-ryeong (이서령), the head of the Daejeon branch of the Democratic United Party, on January 7, 2012.

== Censorship ==
The South Korean military under the Lee Myung-bak government cracks down soldiers who have "critical apps" installed in their smartphones; allegedly marking Naneun Ggomsuda as an anti-government content.

== Media Impact ==
Naneun Ggomsuda has been downloaded by six million people since it was started in April, 2011 to November, 2011.

== See also ==
- Criticism of Lee Myung-bak
