= Lee Ki-paik =

South Korean army general officer and politician (1931–2019)

- 이기백
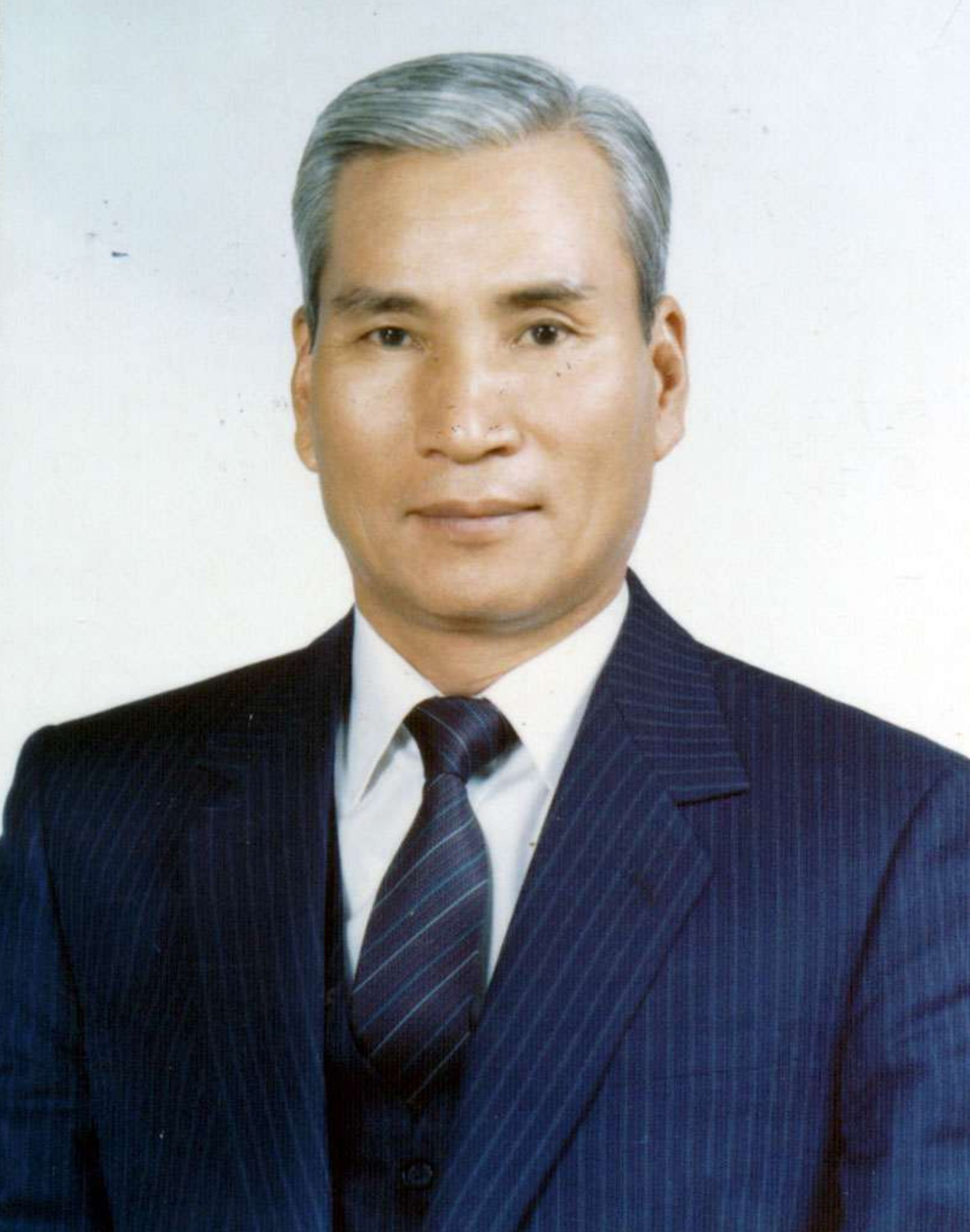

Minister of National Defense
- In office 8 January 1986 – 14 July 1987
- President: Chun Doo-hwan
- Preceded by: Yoon Sung-min
- Succeeded by: Chung Ho-yong

Chairman of the Joint Chiefs of Staff
- In office 3 June 1983 – 3 June 1985
- Preceded by: Kim Yoon-ho
- Succeeded by: Jung Jin-kwon (정진권)

Personal details
- Born: 20 October 1931 Keijō, Korea, Empire of Japan
- Died: 16 December 2019 (aged 88) Seoul, South Korea
- Resting place: Seoul National Cemetery
- Citizenship: South Korean
- Party: Independent
- Education: Korea Military Academy

Military service
- Allegiance: South Korea
- Branch/service: Republic of Korea Army
- Rank: Jiang (General)
- Battles/wars: Korean War

Lee Ki-paik (Korean: 이기백; October 20, 1931 – December 16, 2019) was a South Korean politician and former military officer.

== Biography ==
He descended from the Goseong Lee clan, used the pen name Seokgwan, and was born in Yeongi County, South Chungcheong Province. A classmate of former President Chun Doo-hwan at the Korea Military Academy, he served as Chairman of the Joint Chiefs of Staff and Minister of National Defense during the Fifth Republic. He was a key figure in the "Peace Dam" incident. He was active as a member of the Korea Retired Generals and Admirals Association and as a special advisor to the Grand National Party, frequently voicing conservative views on military issues.
