= Lee Sang-min (lawyer) =

South Korean lawyer and politician

- 이상민
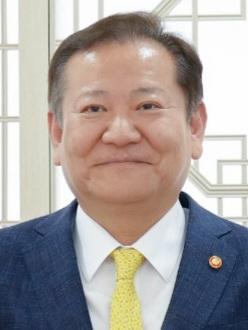
- Lee in 2024

Minister of the Interior and Safety
- In office 12 May 2022 – 8 December 2024
- President: Yoon Suk Yeol
- Prime Minister: Han Duck-soo
- Preceded by: Jeon Hae-cheol
- Succeeded by: Ko Ki-dong (acting); Kim Min-jae (acting); Yun Ho-jung

Personal details
- Born: 10 November 1964 (age 61) Iksan, North Jeolla, South Korea
- Party: Independent
- Other political affiliations: Chungam Faction (since 2022)
- Education: Chungam High School; Seoul National University (LLB); Korea University (MBA)

Military service
- Allegiance: South Korea
- Branch/service: Republic of Korea Air Force
- Years of service: 1989–1992
- Rank: Captain
- Unit: Military advocate
- Criminal information
- Movement: 2024 martial law
- Convictions: Insurrection; Perjury
- Penalty: 7 years imprisonment, increased to 9 years on appeal

Details
- Date apprehended: 1 August 2025
- Imprisoned at: Seoul Detention Center

Lee Sang-min (Korean: 이상민; born 10 November 1964) is a South Korean lawyer and a former judge who served as the minister of the interior and safety from 12 May 2022 until his resignation on 8 December 2024. He is best known for his involvement in the 2024 South Korean martial law declaration. On 12 February 2026, Lee was sentenced to seven years imprisonment for his role in the martial law declaration. The sentence was increased to nine years on appeal on 12 May 2026.

== Career ==
As a minister of the MoIS, he was responsible for regional development, administrative innovation and public safety. He was recognized as one of the most powerful people in Yoon Suk Yeol's administration. However, after the 2022 Seoul Halloween crowd crush, he had to offer an official apology to the victims, although the crush had occurred at a private festival place in Itaewon on Halloween. On 9 February 2023, he was impeached by the National Assembly, where opposition party was overwhelmingly in the majority regarding the disaster. He was succeeded by his deputy Han Chang-seob in an acting capacity. He would return to office after the Constitutional Court of Korea rejected his impeachment with a unanimous conclusion on 25 July 2023. The court announced that the crush was not just caused by specific person or sole reason, but was the result of the lack in total capacity of countermeasure in the public sector. As a result, he maintained his position and remained in power for more than 870 days until his resignation.

== 2024 martial law association ==
In December 2024, following the controversial declaration of emergency martial law by President Yoon Suk Yeol, Interior Minister Lee Sang-min presided over an emergency executive meeting. The martial law was later revoked by the National Assembly, but the decision sparked significant political backlash. On 7 December 2024, the Democratic Party of Korea filed an impeachment motion against Lee, accusing him of mishandling the martial law situation. The motion was set for a vote in the National Assembly. Facing mounting pressure, Lee resigned on 8 December.

On 11 February 2025, Lee testified at Yoon's impeachment trial. On 1 August 2025, Lee was arrested on charges of involvement in the martial law declaration. He was convicted and sentenced to seven years imprisonment on 12 February 2026. He was primarily convicted for participating in insurrection, due to his relaying of orders to cut electricity and water to media outlets critical of Yoon's policies. He was also convicted on a lesser charge of perjury for falsely testifying during Yoon's impeachment trial that he had never relayed these orders, or received them from Yoon. On the lesser charge of abusing his authority he was found not guilty, as he was exercising his official powers when he relayed the orders to former Commissioner of the National Fire Agency Heo Seokgon. Lee was the second member of Yoon's cabinet to be convicted in a lower court for crimes related to the martial law crisis. The sentence was increased to nine years on appeal on 12 May 2026, after the appeals court regarded the initial sentence as too lenient.
