= Hanahoe =

1963–1993 South Korean political faction

Group of One
- A commemorative photo taken in front of the Military Security Command building on December 14, 1979, after the success of Coup d'état of December Twelfth. From the left side of the bottom row, the fourth is Roh Tae-woo and the fifth is Chun Doo-hwan.
- Leader: Chun Doo-hwan; Roh Tae-woo
- Founder: Chun Doo-hwan
- Founded: 1963
- Dissolved: 1993
- Preceded by: Chilseonghoe
- Membership: Democratic Republican Party (faction); Democratic Justice Party; Democratic Liberal Party
- Ideology: Radical anti-communism; Pro–Chun Doo-hwan; Militarism
- Political position: Far-right

Korean name
- Hangul: 하나회
- Hanja: 하나會
- RR: Hanahoe
- MR: Hanahoe

Hanahoe (Korean: 하나회; lit. 'Group of One') was an unofficial private group and secret society of military officers in South Korea headed by Chun Doo-hwan, who later became the South Korean president during the Fifth Republic era.

== History ==
An article in the Encyclopedia of Korean Culture traces the group's origins to the private group Chilsonghoe (칠성회; 七星會; lit. 'Seven Star Society') in 1958 that was formed by seven people, including Chun Doo-hwan, Roh Tae-woo, and Chung Ho-yong. The group was an expansion of the group Osunghoe (오성회; 五星會; lit. 'Five Star Society'), formed in 1951, which had five members-Roh, Chun, Kim Bok-dong, Choi Sung-taek, Park Byung-ha, and Chilsonghoe included two more members-Jung Ho-yong and Kwon Yik-hyon.

Initially formed by graduates of the eleventh class of the Korea Military Academy in 1955, Hanahoe built up its ranks by recruiting three to four members per subsequent classes of the KMA, mostly from Gyeongsang Province. Hanahoe formed the core of the junta that eventually took control of the presidency and government from Choi Kyu-hah in the December 12, 1979 and the Coup d'état of May Seventeenth, 1980, ending the Fourth Republic. Subsequently, Hanahoe also played an instrumental role in violent suppression of the Gwangju Uprising.

After its initial seizure of power, Hanahoe maintained great influence in South Korean politics throughout the 1980s, but was later disbanded by force in 1993 upon inauguration of Kim Young-sam. Chun Doo-hwan and Roh Tae-Woo, together with other members of Hanahoe, were convicted for their role in the two coups and Gwangju Massacre.

== In popular culture ==
- The 2005 TV series 5th Republic was the first mentioned media featuring the Hanahoe's 1979 coup and the entire history of the Fifth Republic of Korea.
- The 2023 South Korean film 12.12: The Day follows a fictionalized version of Hanahoe's 1979 coup.

== See also ==
- Chungam Faction
