= Hong Jang-won =

South Korean political appointee (born 1964)

- 홍장원

First Deputy Director of the National Intelligence Service (South Korea)
- In office November 2023 – December 2024

Personal details
- Born: 1964 (age 61–62) Changwon, South Korea
- Education: University of Helsinki; University of London; Boston University; Korea Military Academy

Korean name
- Hangul: 홍장원
- RR: Hong Jangwon
- MR: Hong Changwŏn

Hong Jang-won (Korean: 홍장원; born 1964) is a political appointee in South Korea who served as the First Deputy Director of National Intelligence Service (NIS) from 2023 to 2024.

== Biography ==
A graduate of the 43rd class of Korea Military Academy, he served as a company commander in the 707th Special Mission Group, specializing in counterterrorism operations during his military service. He was discharged as a reserve major in Republic of Korea Army.

After joining the Agency for National Security Planning (ANSP), he worked in intelligence agencies, primarily in foreign intelligence collection and covert operations. He later served as Chief Secretary to NIS Director and as the Director's Special Advisor on North Korea.

In November 2023, following the dismissal of NIS Director, First Deputy Director, and Second Deputy Director, he was appointed First Deputy Director of NIS.

== 2024 South Korean martial law crisis ==
During the 2024 South Korean martial law crisis, President Yoon Suk Yeol allegedly ordered him to assist the Defense Counterintelligence Command (DCIC) and to "take this opportunity to arrest and clean them up." After speaking with President Yoon, Hong reportedly called DCIC Commander Yeo In-hyung to relay the order. Yeo later testified that he provided a list of politicians—including Lee Jae-myung, Cho Kuk, and Han Dong-hoon—and requested location tracking.

On 18 May 2026, he and five other former NIS political appointees including former NIS director Cho Tae-yong were also booked for questioning for performing key duties related to the insurrection. The special counsel investigating the martial law secured overseas briefing materials during an April 2026 raid on the National Intelligence Service, reportedly containing explanations defending the background and legitimacy of the martial law declaration to South Korea's allies. Hong was accused of translating the documents into English to brief the American Central Intelligence Agency's Seoul station chief at the instructions of Director Cho Tae-yong, as Hong was in charge of NIS's overseas operations, although Hong denied the charges.
