= 3rd Army (South Korea) =

- 제3야전군
- Active: 1 July 1973 – 31 December 2018
- Country: South Korea
- Branch: Republic of Korea Army
- Type: Field Army
- Garrison/HQ: Yongin, Gyeonggi Province
- Nickname: Vanguard

Commanders
- Notable commanders: Baek Gun-gi

The 3rd Army was a field army of the South Korean Army.

== History ==
The 3rd Army was formed on 1 July 1973. The purpose of the 3rd Army was to defend the metropolitan areas of the Gyeonggi Province as well as the western frontline area. In 2015, it was announced that 1st Army would be merged with the 3rd Army in order to form the Republic of Korea Army Ground Operations Command. The 1st and 3rd Armies were disbanded on 31 December 2018 while the Republic of Korea Army Ground Operations Command was formed a day later on 1 January 2019. On 15 January 2025, 3rd Field Army Military Police Commander Colonel Kim Yong-gun was arrested for allegedly planning the 2024 South Korean martial law crisis with former intelligence commander Roh Sang-won. On 27 February 2025, the 25th Criminal Division of the Seoul Central District Court accused former ROK Army Intelligence Commander Noh Sang-won of planning the 2024 South Korean martial law crisis with the aid of Kim Yong-gun.
