= Park An-su =

South Korean general (born 1968)

- 박안수
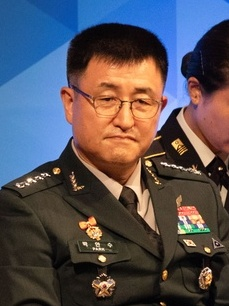
- Born: 28 May 1968 (age 58); Cheongdo, North Gyeongsang Province, South Korea
- Education: Korea Military Academy
- Spouse: Son Gwon-hee
- Children: 3
- Military career
- Allegiance: South Korea
- Branch: Republic of Korea Army
- Service years: 1990–2025
- Rank: General
- Commands: Chief of Staff of the Republic of Korea Army; 50th Infantry Division

Park An-su (Korean: 박안수; born 28 May 1968) is a South Korean general who served as the 51st chief of staff of the Republic of Korea Army from 2023, though he was suspended in 2024, and his term expired in 2025. (Note: Park was suspended from duties from 12 December 2024 to the expiry of his term on 30 October 2025. He did not face dismissal from his post due to a lack of a quorum of 3 senior superiors to constitute a disciplinary committee. General Go Chang-jun served as acting chief of staff from 12 December 2024 to his retirement on 3 September 2025, followed by General Kim Gyu-ha after 3 September.) Park was commissioned from the Korea Military Academy in 1990, and his notable commands during his career included the 50th Infantry Division. He was appointed as the Martial Law Commander of the 2024 martial law declaration under President Yoon Suk Yeol, for which he was suspended. In 2026, he was sentenced to 10 years in prison for his role in the insurrection.

== Life ==
Park was born on 28 May 1968. He attended Cheongdo Central Elementary School, and graduated from Deokwon High School. He joined the Korea Military Academy shortly thereafter, and graduated in its 46th class. He later married Son Gwon-hee and they had three children.

== Career ==
As of 2013, Park was a colonel and served as the commander of the 50th Infantry Division. In 2016, he was promoted to brigadier general, subsequently being promoted to major general and lieutenant general in 2019 and 2022 respectively.

=== Chief of Staff ===
On 30 October 2023, he was promoted to general and became the 51st chief of Staff of the Republic of Korea Army. His appointment was part of a reshuffle of the military command by President Yoon Suk Yeol and Defense Minister Shin Won-sik, who took the unusual move of replacing every four-star officer, who had been promoted by the previous Moon Jae-in administration. Park and the others were seen as more aligned with Yoon's hawkish views against North Korea.

In May 2024, Park traveled to the United States to attend the Land Forces Pacific Symposium.

After being detained for his role in the 2024 South Korean martial law crisis, he was not officially discharged from the military until the end of his term on 30 October 2025, though an acting chief of staff was appointed after his detainment.

=== Martial Law Commander ===
At 22:23 on 3 December, Yoon began making his emergency address to the nation, and at 22:27, declared martial law. Park was appointed by Yoon as Martial Law Commander the same day.

At 23:25 the same day, Park issued the following decree which retroactively took effect at 23:00:

Martial Law Command proclaims the following as of 23:00 on 3 December 2024, in order to protect liberal democracy from anti-state forces active within the free Republic of Korea and their threats to subvert the state, and to ensure public safety.

1. All political activities, including activities of the National Assembly, local councils, political parties, and political association, rallies and demonstrations, are prohibited.
2. All acts that deny or attempt to overthrow the free democratic system are prohibited. The dissemination of fake news, manipulation of public opinion, and false propaganda are prohibited.
3. All media and publications are subject to the control of Martial Law Command.
4. Strikes, work stoppages, and rallies that incite social chaos are prohibited.
5. Trainee doctors and all other medical personnel, who are on strike or have left their worksites, must return to their positions within 48 hours and work faithfully. Those who violate the order will face punishment in accordance with the Martial Law Act.
6. Innocent ordinary citizens, excluding anti-state forces and other subversive forces, will be subject to measures to minimize inconvenience in their daily lives.

Violators of the proclamation may be arrested, detained and searched without a warrant in accordance with Article 9 of the Martial Law Act (Special Measures Authority of the Martial Law Commander), and will be punished in accordance with Article 14 of the Martial Law Act (Penalties).

— Martial Law Commander, Army General Park An-su

Yoon's martial law decree went further than those of previous military dictators by suspending the National Assembly. However, Yoon's decree stopped short of ordering curfews or the closure of universities.

At 01:02 on 4 December, 190 legislators who had arrived at the National Assembly Proceeding Hall unanimously passed a motion to lift martial law, despite attempts by the Republic of Korea Army Special Warfare Command to prevent the vote. At 04:30, Yoon and his cabinet lifted martial law and soon disbanded the Martial Law Command.

== Trial ==
=== Pre-trial ===
On 5 December 2024, Park told lawmakers that he did not write the martial law declaration, and before approving a draft of the declaration, he only fixed "an error with [the] stated timing". He also said he was unaware of soldiers being deployed to the National Assembly. Park also submitted his resignation to Yoon, which was rejected. On 12 December, Park was suspended as Chief of Staff of the Army as a result of the 2024 martial law declaration. On 17 December 2024, Park was arrested for insurrection and abuse of power with a court-issued warrant, becoming the fifth to be arrested on the matter of the martial law declaration. Park was indicted on insurrection charges on 25 February 2025.

=== Proceedings ===
Park's trial began on 26 March, along with Army Special Warfare Chief Kwak Jong-geun. He was released on bail on 25 June.

On 21 September 2026, the Seoul Central District Court sentenced Park to 10 years in prison for issuing the unconstitutional martial law declaration despite knowing that South Korea was not at war or facing a national emergency, and for restricting access to the National Assembly.
