= Kim Ou-joon =

South Korean journalist (born 1968)

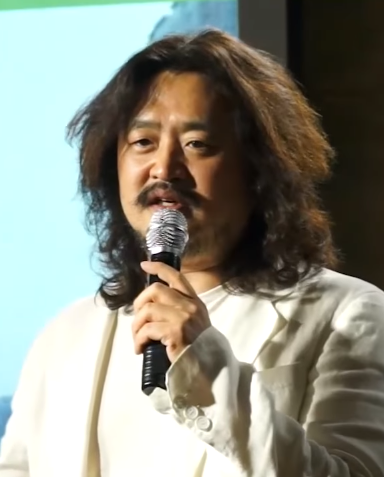
- Kim in 2016
- Born: December 6, 1968 (age 57); Jinhae, South Korea
- Education: Hongik University
- Occupations: Journalist, producer

Korean name
- Hangul: 김어준
- Hanja: 金於俊
- RR: Gim Eojun
- MR: Kim Ŏjun

Kim Ou-joon (Korean: 김어준; born December 6, 1968) is a South Korean journalist. He is also well-known for the host of multiple political podcasts. Kim was the original creator of Naneun Ggomsuda and currently runs Ddanzi Ilbo's DAS Boeida and Traffic Broadcasting System's News Factory.

After the December 2024 South Korean martial law political crisis, National Intelligence Service (NIS) Deputy Director Hong Jang-won testified to the National Assembly that president Yoon Suk Yeol ordered him to arrest Kim and other political opponents. After the declaration, Kim immediately fled to a remote location for 36 hours, fearing for his life. Kim later testified to the Assembly that he received a report claiming the Yoon administration planned to assassinate People Power Party (PPP) leader Han Dong-hoon and lay the blame on North Korea, though he could not fully confirm its veracity. In response, PPP said they will pursue legal action for defamation and to identify the reporter.

== Filmography ==
Year	Title	Original title	Network	Medium	Notes
2017–	DAS Boeida	다스 뵈이다	Ddanzi Ilbo	Podcast	Host
2016–	News Factory	뉴스공장	tbs	Radio	Host
2017–2018	Black House	블랙하우스	SBS	TV	Host
2014–2017	Papa is	파파이스	Hankyoreh	Podcast	Host
2011–2012	Naneun Ggomsuda	나는 꼼수다	Ddanzi Ilbo	Podcast	Co-host
2011	Eextraordinary Counseling	색다른 상담소	MBC	Radio	Host
2010–2011	Dating at 2 pm	2시의 데이트	MBC	Radio	Fixed guest
2009–2012	New York Times	뉴욕타임스	Hankyoreh	Podcast	Host

=== Film ===
Year	Title	Original title	Role
2017	The Reservoir Games	저수지게임	Himself
2017	The Plan	더 플랜	Himself
