= Kwak Jong-geun =

South Korean lieutenant general (born 1968)

- 곽종근
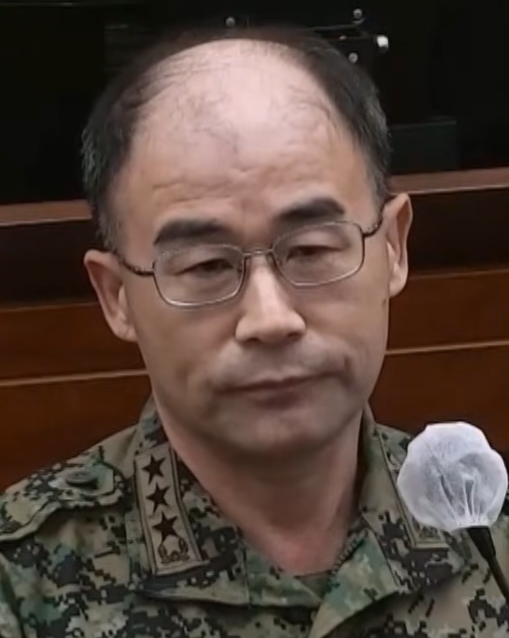
- Kwak in 2025

Personal details
- Born: 1 January 1968 (age 58) South Chungcheong Province, South Korea
- Children: 2
- Education: Korea Military Academy

Military service
- Branch/service: Republic of Korea Army
- Years of service: 1991-2025
- Rank: Lieutenant general

Korean name
- Hangul: 곽종근
- Hanja: 郭種根
- RR: Gwak Jonggeun
- MR: Kwak Chonggŭn

Kwak Jong-geun (Korean: 곽종근; born 1 January 1968) is a South Korean three-star army lieutenant general who served as the 32nd Chief of the Army Special Warfare Command from 2023 to 2025. Kwak has served in the Republic of Korea Army since 1991. He is widely known for his role in the 2024 martial law crisis.

After being denied the rank three times by previous administrations, Kwak became a lieutenant general under the administration of President Yoon Suk Yeol. Kwak was also nominated as Chief of the Army Special Warfare Command, despite having no experience within the Special Warfare Command. It is speculated that Kwak only received these promotions for being loyal to Yoon.

On 3 December 2024, President Yoon declared emergency martial law during a televised address. Yoon ordered Kwak and Capital Defense Commander Lee Jin-woo to seize the legislature in an attempt to prevent lawmakers from voting down the declaration. Despite this, 190 lawmakers managed to make it into the National Assembly where they voted unanimously to lift the martial law. Yoon lifted the martial law a few hours later.

On 6 December, Kwak's duties were temporarily suspended by the Ministry of Justice when his role in the declaration was discovered. On 16 December, Kwak was arrested for his involvement, On 6 February 2025, a leave of absence from prosecution was issued against Kwak by the military for his imprisonment. His trial began on 26 March, where he confessed to all of the charges filed against him. On 4 April, he was released from prison on bail.

Kwak was removed from service on 29 December 2025. However, in recognition for his cooperation in the martial law investigation, removal from service restricts reappointment for three years but does not reduce pension benefits, unlike a full dismissal where reappointment to public office is barred for five years and retirement benefits are cut.

== Life and education ==
Kwak Jong-geun was born on 1 January 1968 in South Chungcheong Province, South Korea. He graduated Chungnam High School in 1987, and entered the Korea Military Academy shortly thereafter. He graduated the academy's 47th class in 1991, where he began to serve in the Republic of Korea Army. At one point, he got married and had two children.

== Career ==
Planning Directorate, Ground Operations Command
Commanding General, 17th Infantry Division
Director of Operations, Joint Chiefs of Staff
Director of OPCON Transition Group, Joint Chiefs of Staff
Commander, Army Special Warfare Command
Jan 2025 – Dec 29, 2025: Suspended due to indictment and dismissed

== Involvement in the 2024 martial law crisis ==
On 3 December 2024, Yoon declared emergency martial law across the nation during a televised address. In his declaration, Yoon accused the Democratic Party (DPK), which has a majority in the National Assembly, of conducting "anti-state activities" and collaborating with "North Korean communists" to destroy the country, thereby creating a "legislative dictatorship". The order prohibited political activities, including gatherings of the National Assembly and local legislatures, and suspended the free press.

The declaration was opposed by both parties and resulted in protests. At 01:02 on 4 December, 190 legislators who had arrived at the National Assembly Proceeding Hall unanimously passed a motion to lift martial law, despite attempts by the Republic of Korea Army Special Warfare Command to prevent the vote.

Subsequent investigations revealed that President Yoon ordered Kwak and Lee Jin-woo to break through the plenary chamber doors to drag the lawmakers out at 00:40 to 00:50 hours, which was too late as the lawmakers had begun the session to end martial law at that time. In the indictment of Kim Yong-hyun on 27 December by the special prosecution team, it also revealed Yoon told Commander Lee; "Break down the doors, even if it means shooting." Upon finding out about the National Assembly vote being passed, Yoon denied it was legitimate at first, and told Commander Lee, "It's not even confirmed that 190 people came in. Even if martial law was lifted, I just have to declare martial law two or three more times, so keep going."

At 04:30, Yoon and his cabinet lifted martial law and soon disbanded the Martial Law Command. The opposition subsequently began impeachment proceedings against Yoon and said it would continue to do so if he did not resign. On 6 December, Kwak's Army Special Warfare Command commander duties were suspended by the Ministry of Justice. He was travel barred on 9 December by the National Police Agency's National Investigation Headquarters' Emergency Martial Law Special Investigation Unit, along with Lee Jin-woo.

== Trial ==
=== Pre-trial ===
On 16 December, Kwak was arrested on charges of leading an insurrection and abuse of power. On 6 February 2025, a leave of absence from prosecution was issued against Kwak by the military for his imprisonment. Prosecutors speculated that out of the three generals involved in the martial law declaration, Kwak was most likely to be found guilty. On 13 March, Kwak's wife received threatening text messages by an anonymous alumnus of the Korea Military Academy's 47th class due to her husband's role in the declaration.

=== Proceedings ===
Kwak's trial began on 26 March, along with Chief of Staff of the Army Park An-su. Kwak immediately confessed to all of the charges filed against him, while Park claimed he was coerced by Minister Kim Yong-hyun. On 4 April, Kwak was released from prison on bail. Park was released on bail two months later on 25 June.
