= Defense Intelligence Agency (South Korea) =

South Korean government agency

The Defense Intelligence Agency (DIA, Korean: 국방정보본부) is the military intelligence and combat support agency of the Republic of Korea's Ministry of National Defense (MND). It is tasked with advancing military intelligence through collection and analysis of intelligence from around the world.

The agency is responsible for analysis and development of intelligence collection and counterintelligence systems to create military intelligence networks, clandestine and covert operations, countering hybrid threats, counterterrorism, executive protection, foreign military threat assessment to national security, information warfare, military cybersecurity and cyberwarfare, and military intelligence, as well as intelligence gathering and counterintelligence, protect classified military information and documents, psychological warfare, and support hybrid warfare operations.

== Activities ==
The Defense Intelligence Agency is a unit under the direct control of the Ministry of National Defense. It was established in 1981 to manage matters related to military intelligence and security. It is subordinate to the Intelligence Command and Defense Security Agency (777 Command).

It was created in imitation of the United States Defense Intelligence Agency (DIA). It is customary for the DIA director to be appointed by an Air Force lieutenant general, but in Korea, the head of the Defense Intelligence Headquarters is appointed by an Army lieutenant general or an Air Force lieutenant general..

== Subordinate units ==
- Defence Intelligence Command
  - HID (Headquarters of Intelligence Detachment)
  - UDU (Underwater Demolition Unit)
- Defense Security Agency (777 Command).
