= Shin Won-sik =

South Korean politician

- 신원식
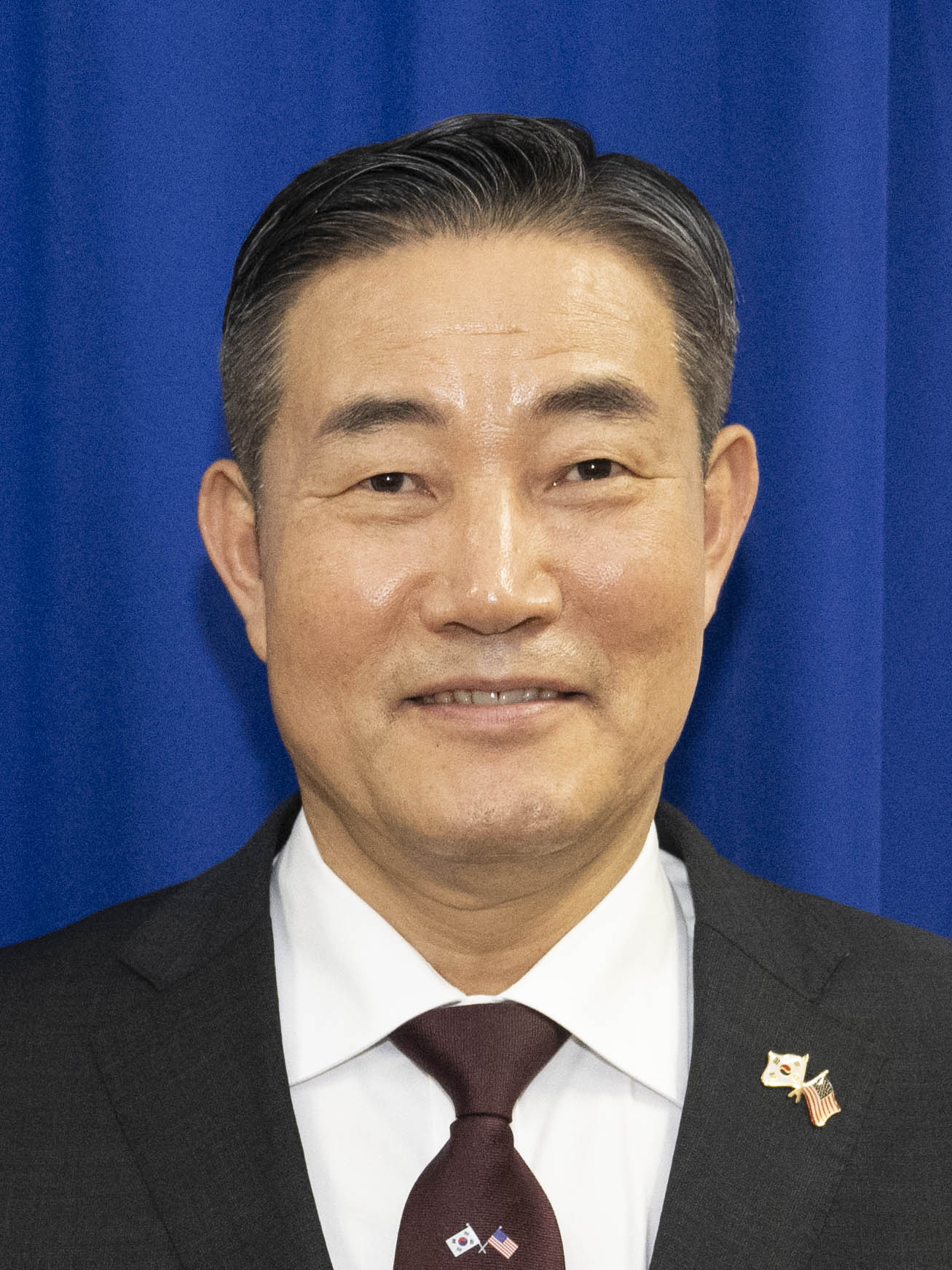
- Shin in 2024

Director of National Security Office
- In office 12 August 2024 – 3 June 2025
- President: Yoon Suk Yeol
- Preceded by: Chang Ho-jin
- Succeeded by: Wi Sung-lac

Minister of National Defense
- In office 7 October 2023 – 9 September 2024
- President: Yoon Suk Yeol
- Prime Minister: Han Duck-soo
- Preceded by: Lee Jong-sup
- Succeeded by: Kim Yong-hyun

Member of the National Assembly
- In office 30 May 2020 – 31 October 2023
- Constituency: Proportional

Vice Chairman of the Joint Chiefs of Staff
- In office 7 April 2015 – 27 October 2015
- President: Park Geun-hye
- Preceded by: Kim Yu-geun
- Succeeded by: Um Hyun-sung

Personal details
- Born: 24 July 1958 (age 68) Tongyeong, South Korea
- Party: People Power Party
- Other political affiliations: Future Korea Party
- Education: Korea Military Academy (BA); Kyungnam University (MBA); Kookmin University (PhD)

Military service
- Allegiance: South Korea
- Branch/service: Republic of Korea Army
- Years of service: 1981–2016
- Rank: Lieutenant general

- Shin Won-sik
- Hangul: 신원식
- Hanja: 申源湜
- RR: Sin Wonsik
- MR: Sin Wŏnsik

Shin Won-sik (Korean: 신원식, born 24 July 1958) is a South Korean politician, retired army lieutenant general and former vice chairman of the Joint Chiefs of Staff. He held the position of Minister of National Defense within the cabinet of President Yoon Suk Yeol from 7 October 2023 until 9 September 2024. He was 8th director of the South Korean National Security Bureau from 12 August 2024 until 4 June 2025.

== Biography ==
He was born in Tongyeong, South Gyeongsang Province.

=== Military career ===
Shin graduated from the 37th class of the Korea Military Academy in 1981. On 24 October 1985, a private from the 5th Company of the 2nd Battalion, 21st Regiment, 8th Division of the Army, of which Captain Shin Won-sik was the company commander at the time, was killed in a training accident. At the time, the military reported that it was caused by unexploded ordnance. A later reinvestigation by the Presidential Military Network Accident Investigation Commission found that the accident was caused by a misfired bullet. From 2012 to 2013, he served as the commanding general of the Capital Defense Command, in charge of defending Seoul. His final rank was Lieutenant General of the Army, and he served as the Chief of Operations of the Joint Chiefs of Staff and the Deputy Chairman of the Joint Chiefs of Staff. Shin retired from the military in 2016.

=== Political career ===
In 2020, Shin was elected as a member of the 21st National Assembly of the Republic of Korea for the Future Korea Party, which later merged into the United Future Party (now the People Power Party). On 13 September 2023, President Yoon Suk Yeol nominated Shin as a candidate for the Minister of National Defense. Shin is considered a hawk in South Korean foreign policy towards North Korea, having criticized his country's Sunshine Policy. His nomination was confirmed on 7 October 2023. Since 12 August 2024, he is the current 8th director of the South Korean Office of National Security. Until his successor takes up his duties, he temporarily serves as Chief of Security and Minister of Defence. There is a precedent for such a case of Kim Kwan-jin (former Defense Minister of Lee Myung-Bak and Park Geun-hye who held both positions from 1 to 29 June 2014).

== See also ==
- Cabinet of Yoon Suk Yeol

Military offices
Preceded by Kim Yu-geun	Vice Chairman of the Joint Chiefs of Staff; 2015	Succeeded by Um Hyun-sung
Political offices
Preceded by Lee Jong-sup	Minister of National Defense; 2023–2024	Succeeded by Kim Yong-hyun
