= Defense Counterintelligence Command =

South Korean intelligence organization

- 국군방첩사령부
- Active: 21 October 1950 – 31 July 2026
- Country: South Korea
- Type: Military counterintelligence inter-service command
- Part of: Ministry of National Defense
- Garrison/HQ: Gwacheon, South Korea
- Motto: Limitless Dedication for the Protection of Liberty of the Republic of Korea
- Website: Official website in English; Official website in Korean

Commanders
- Current commander: Lt. Gen. Yeo In-hyung (former)
- Notable commanders: General Chun Doo-hwan; General Roh Tae-woo; Lt. Gen. Chang Do-yong; Lt. Gen. Yeo In-hyung

Korean name
- Hangul: 국군방첩사령부
- Hanja: 國軍防諜司令部
- RR: Gukgun bangcheop saryeongbu
- MR: Kukkun pangch'ŏp saryŏngbu

The Defense Counterintelligence Command (DCC; Korean: 국군방첩사령부) was the military intelligence security agency of the Republic of Korea (South Korea) Ministry of National Defense (MND) tasked with advancing military counterintelligence through collecting and analyzing intelligence from around the world. It was founded as the Army Counterintelligence Corps (commonly known as CIC or KACIC; meaning: Special Operation Forces) on 21 October 1950.

The DCC was primarily responsible for analysis and development of intelligence collection and counterintelligence systems to create military security networks, clandestine and covert operations, countering hybrid threats, counterterrorism, defense (arms) industry security, executive protection, foreign military threat assessment to national security, forensic science for investigations, information warfare, military counterintelligence, military cybersecurity, psychological warfare, protect classified military information and documents, and support the investigation and interrogation of military crimes.

The unit was reorganized into the Defense Counterintelligence Command on 1 November 2022.

On 31 July 2026, the Defense Counterintelligence Command (DCC) was formally dissolved by the Ministry of National Defense after 49 years of operation, following years of controversy and allegations of misuse, most notably during the December 2024 martial law crisis.

== Names ==
- Army Counterintelligence Corps (21 October 1950 – 20 July 1960)
- Army Counterintelligence Unit (20 July 1960 – 23 September 1968)
- Army Security Command (23 September 1968 – 1 September 1977)
- Military Security Command (1 September 1977 – 1 January 1991)
- Defense Security Command (1 January 1991 – 1 September 2018)
- Defense Security Support Command (1 September 2018 – 1 November 2022)
- Defense Counterintelligence Command (1 November 2022 – 31 July 2026)

== History ==
The Defense Counterintelligence Command was formally activated in September 1977 under the name Military Security Command (MSC; 국군보안사령부; 國軍保安司令部). This merger of the Army Security Command, the Navy Security Unit, and the Air Force Office of Special Investigations produced a single, integrated unit under the direct command and operational control of the minister of national defense.

Chun Doo-hwan became chief of the Military Security Command in February 1979, eight months before Park Chung Hee was assassinated on 26 October 1979. From his position as commander of the DSC, Chun effectively became chief investigator of the assassination. On 12 December 1979, a group of generals led by Chun arrested martial law commander General Jeong Seung-hwa, the army chief of staff, and seized key sites in the capital.

The DSC's involvement in 1979 was considered and defined as attempt of a coup by state council.

During the Gwangju Uprising, many plainclothed DSC operatives disguised themselves as protesters to conduct clandestine and covert operations, counterintelligence, counterinsurgency, and psychological warfare against civilian militias. Their main objective was arrest and detain militia members illegally and fabricating accusations and rumours about militia to ruin the militia's reputation and make the uprising look like North Korean operatives involved.

On 11 November 2011, the Seoul National Labor Relations Commission exposed a DSC member who had been illegally collecting the information of civilians registered in the National Health Insurance Corporation for three and a half years.

Before the impeachment of Park Geun-hye in March 2017, the DSC was planning a self-coup and a declaration of martial law in case the impeachment of Park Geun-hye failed and anticipation of prolonged protests in response. The DSC's self-coup plan document was revealed to the public in 2018.
