= 2025 in politics =

These are some notable events relating to politics in 2025.

== Events ==
=== January ===
- January 1
  - Bulgaria and Romania finalized the process of joining the Schengen Area, lifting land border controls.
  - Liechtenstein became the 39th country to legalize same-sex marriage.
  - Ukraine becomes a state party in the International Criminal Court.
- January 6
  - Canadian prime minister Justin Trudeau announces his intention to resign amidst a political crisis.
  - Indonesia officially becomes a full member of BRICS.
- January 8 – Unknown assailants attack the presidential palace in the Chadian capital of N'Djamena, resulting in 20 deaths.
- January 9
  - Joseph Aoun is elected president of Lebanon following a two-year vacancy.
  - The state funeral of former US President Jimmy Carter is held in Washington, D.C.
- January 12 – Croatian president Zoran Milanović wins re-election against Dragan Primorac in the second round of voting.
- January 15 – South Korean president Yoon Suk Yeol was arrested by the CIO for his role in the martial law crisis, as part of the process of his impeachment.
- January 16 – The 2025 Vanuatuan general election was held.
- January 18 – Two judges of the Supreme Court of Iran are assassinated at the Palace of Justice in Tehran.
- January 19
  - A ceasefire agreement is reached to suspend the Gaza war.
  - A ban on TikTok in the United States goes into effect.
  - A temporary reservicing of TikTok's United States servers is undergone.
- January 20 – Donald Trump is sworn in as the 47th President of the United States, becoming the second president in American history to serve non-consecutive terms.
- January 23 – Thailand becomes the 40th country to legalize same-sex marriage.
- January 26 – The 2025 Belarusian presidential election was held.
- January 30 – The 2025 Comorian parliamentary election was held.

=== February ===
- February 5 – The Filipino Vice President Sara Duterte, daughter of the country's previous president Rodrigo Duterte, faces her first impeachment. This was the first such impeachment for a vice-president, and the fifth overall, since the country gained democracy in 1935.
- February 9
  - The first round of the 2025 Ecuadorian general election was held.
  - The 2025 Liechtenstein general election was held.
  - The February 2025 Kosovan parliamentary election results in a hung parliament, marking the beginning of the 2025 Kosovo Assembly deadlock.
- February 23 – The 2025 German federal election was held, after being pushed forward as a result of the 2024 German government crisis.

=== March ===
- March 2 – The 2025 Tajik parliamentary election was held.
- March 4 – The 2025 Micronesian parliamentary election was held.
- March 9 – The Liberal Party of Canada holds a leadership election to replace Trudeau as prime minister and Mark Carney was elected at the end of a leadership election as a result.
- March 11 – The 2025 Greenlandic general election was held.
- March 12 – The 2025 Belizean general election was held.
- March 24 – The Constitutional Court of Korea overturned the impeachment of acting South Korean president and Prime Minister Han Duck-soo in-light of the martial law crisis, reinstating his office position. Han would later be convicted again on January 21 the following year.
- March 31 – The Caribbean guilder was introduced, replacing the Netherlands Antillean guilder as the currency for Curaçao and Sint Maarten.

=== April ===
- April 4 – The Constitutional Court of Korea unanimously upheld the impeachment of South Korean president Yoon Suk Yeol over the martial law crisis, making him the second-ever President to be removed from the office in the country's sixth Republic.
- April 12 – The 2025 Gabonese presidential election was held.
- April 13 – The second round of the 2025 Ecuadorian general election was held.
- April 28 – The 2025 Canadian federal election was held following Justin Trudeau's resignation and replacement as Liberal Party leader.
- April 28 – The 2025 Trinidad and Tobago general election was held.

=== May ===
- May 3
  - The 2025 Australian federal election was held, resulting in a landslide majority for the governing Labor Party.
  - The 2025 Singaporean general election was held, with the governing People's Action Party retaining their supermajority.
  - The 2025 Togolese presidential election was held.
- May 4 – The first round of the 2025 Romanian presidential election was held following the annulment of the previous election.
- May 11 – The 2025 Albanian parliamentary election was held, resulting in a victory for the Socialist Party.
- May 12 – The 2025 Philippine general election was held, with the Lakas–CMD becoming the new leading government.
- May 18
  - The second round of the 2025 Romanian presidential election was held, resulting in a victory for independent candidate Nicușor Dan.
  - The first round of the 2025 Polish presidential election was held.
  - The 2025 Portuguese legislative election was held.
- May 25
  - The 2025 Venezuelan parliamentary election was held.
  - The 2025 Surinamese general election was held.

=== June ===
- June 1 – The second round of the 2025 Polish presidential election was held, ending in a narrow victory for conservative candidate Karol Nawrocki.
- June 3 – The 2025 South Korean presidential election was held, with two-time presidential Democratic Party candidate Lee Jae-myung winning the election.
- June 5 – The 2025 Burundian parliamentary election was held.

=== July ===
- July 20 – The 2025 Japanese House of Councillors election was held, with the governing Liberal Democratic Party losing their majority.

=== August ===
- August 4–5 - The 2025 Egyptian Senate election was held.
- August 17 - The 2025 Bolivian general election was held.
- August 29 – The 2025 Samoan general election was held.

=== September ===
- September 1 – The 2025 Guyanese general election was held, with incumbent president Irfaan Ali winning a second and final term.
- September 3 – The 2025 Jamaican general election was held, resulting in a victory for the governing Jamaica Labour Party.
- September 8 – The 2025 Norwegian parliamentary election was held, with the left wing red-green bloc securing a majority of seats.
- September 10 – Charlie Kirk, an American right-wing activist, was assassinated while speaking at a college in Utah.
- September 11 – Former President of Brazil Jair Bolsonaro was sentenced to 27 years in prison in connection to the 2022 Brazilian coup plot and 8 January Brasília attacks.
- September 12 – Sushila Karki was named as Nepal's first female prime minister following the resignation of K. P. Sharma Oli as a result of the 2025 Nepalese Gen Z protests.
- September 16 – The 2025 Malawian general election was held, resulting in a defeat for incumbent president Lazarus Chakwera.
- September 27
  - The 2025 Gabonese parliamentary election was held.
  - The first round of the 2025 Seychellois general election was held.

=== October ===
- October 3 – Henri, Grand Duke of Luxembourg abdicated the throne in favor of his son Guillaume, who reigns as Guillaume V.
- October 3–4 – The 2025 Czech parliamentary election was held, with right-wing populist party ANO winning the most seats.
- October 5 – The 2025 Syrian parliamentary election, the first since the fall of the Assad regime, was held.
- October 9 – Israel and Hamas officially agreed to the first phase of the Gaza peace plan.
- October 10
  - Venezuelan opposition politician and activist María Corina Machado was awarded the 2025 Nobel Peace Prize.
  - A third ceasefire deal in the Gaza war came into effect following the official signing of a deal the previous day.
  - President of Peru Dina Boluarte was impeached and removed from office.
  - Owing to the aftermath of the slush fund scandal and concerns regarding Sanae Takaichi's leadership, Komeito cut ties with the governing Liberal Democratic Party, ending their 26-year coalition between the two Japanese parties.
- October 11 – The 2025 Nauruan parliamentary election was held.
- October 12
  - The 2025 Cameroonian presidential election was held, with incumbent Paul Biya being declared the winner.
  - The 2025 Portuguese local elections were held.
- October 12-14 – Malagasy president Andry Rajoelina was forced from office by an elite unit of the Madagascar Armed Forces.
- October 17 – The 2025 Bolivian general election was held, resulting in a landslide defeat for the governing MAS-IPSP.
- October 20 – Japan Innovation Party forms a new coalition government with the governing Liberal Democratic Party through a confidence and supply agreement. A day later, LDP leader Sanae Takaichi was sworn is as the first female prime minister of Japan.
- October 24 – The 2025 Irish presidential election was held, resulting in a landslide victory for independent candidate Catherine Connolly.
- October 25
  - Lucy Powell is announced as the winner of the 2025 Labour Party deputy leadership election.
  - The 2025 Ivorian presidential election was held, with Alassane Ouattara winning a fourth consecutive term.
- October 26
  - La Libertad Avanza, led by president Javier Milei, secured a decisive victory in the 2025 Argentine legislative election.
  - Timor-Leste officially joined ASEAN as the group's eleventh member.
- October 29
  - The 2025 Tanzanian general election was held.
  - The 2025 Dutch general election was held, with the centrist D66 and far-right PVV winning the most seats.

=== November ===
- November 4 – The 2025 United States elections were held, with the Democratic Party making key gains.
- November 10–11 – The first round of the 2025 Egyptian parliamentary election was held.
- November 11 – The 2025 Iraqi parliamentary election was held.
- November 16 – The first round of the 2025 Chilean general election was held.
- November 10–21 – COP30 was held in Belém, Brazil.
- November 20 – The 2025 Tongan general election was held.
- November 22–23 – South Africa hosted the G20 summit in Johannesburg, the first nation in Africa to do so.
- November 23
  - The 2025 Guinea-Bissau general election was held.
  - The 2025 Republika Srpska presidential election was held.
- November 26 – President of Guinea-Bissau Umaro Sissoco Embaló was arrested and overthrown in a coup d'état a day before election results were due to be announced.
- November 27 – The 2025 Vincentian general election was held, resulting in a landslide victory for the opposition New Democratic Party.
- November 30 – The 2025 Honduran general election was held.

=== December ===
- December 3–4 – The second round of the 2025 Egyptian parliamentary election was held.
- December 8 – The Singapore government released declassified files, dubbed the Albatross file, with information about pre-independence events of Singapore to the public for the first time. The declassification process commenced back on February 28, 2023.
- December 11 – The government of Bulgarian Prime Minister Rosen Zhelyazkov resigned en masse as a result of the ongoing 2025 Bulgarian budget protests.
- December 14 – The second round of the 2025 Chilean general election was held, resulting in a victory for far-right candidate José Antonio Kast.
- December 17–18 – The third round of the 2025 Egyptian parliamentary election was held.
- December 24 – Nasry Asfura was declared the winner of the 2025 Honduran general election nearly a month after the election.
- December 26 – Israel becomes the first United Nations member state to officially recognise Somaliland as an independent state.
- December 27 – The 2025 Ivorian parliamentary election was held.
- December 28
  - The 2025 Central African general election was held.
  - The first phase of the 2025–26 Myanmar general election was held.
  - Albanian nationalist party Vetëvendosje won a landslide in the December 2025 Kosovan parliamentary election.
  - Protests erupt in Iran amid a deepening economic crisis and widespread discontent with the government.

=== Date unknown ===
- Norway aims to ban the sale of all new diesel and petrol cars by this year.
