= 2025 Seoul Western District Court riot =

2025 riot in South Korea

- Part of the arrest of Yoon Suk Yeol
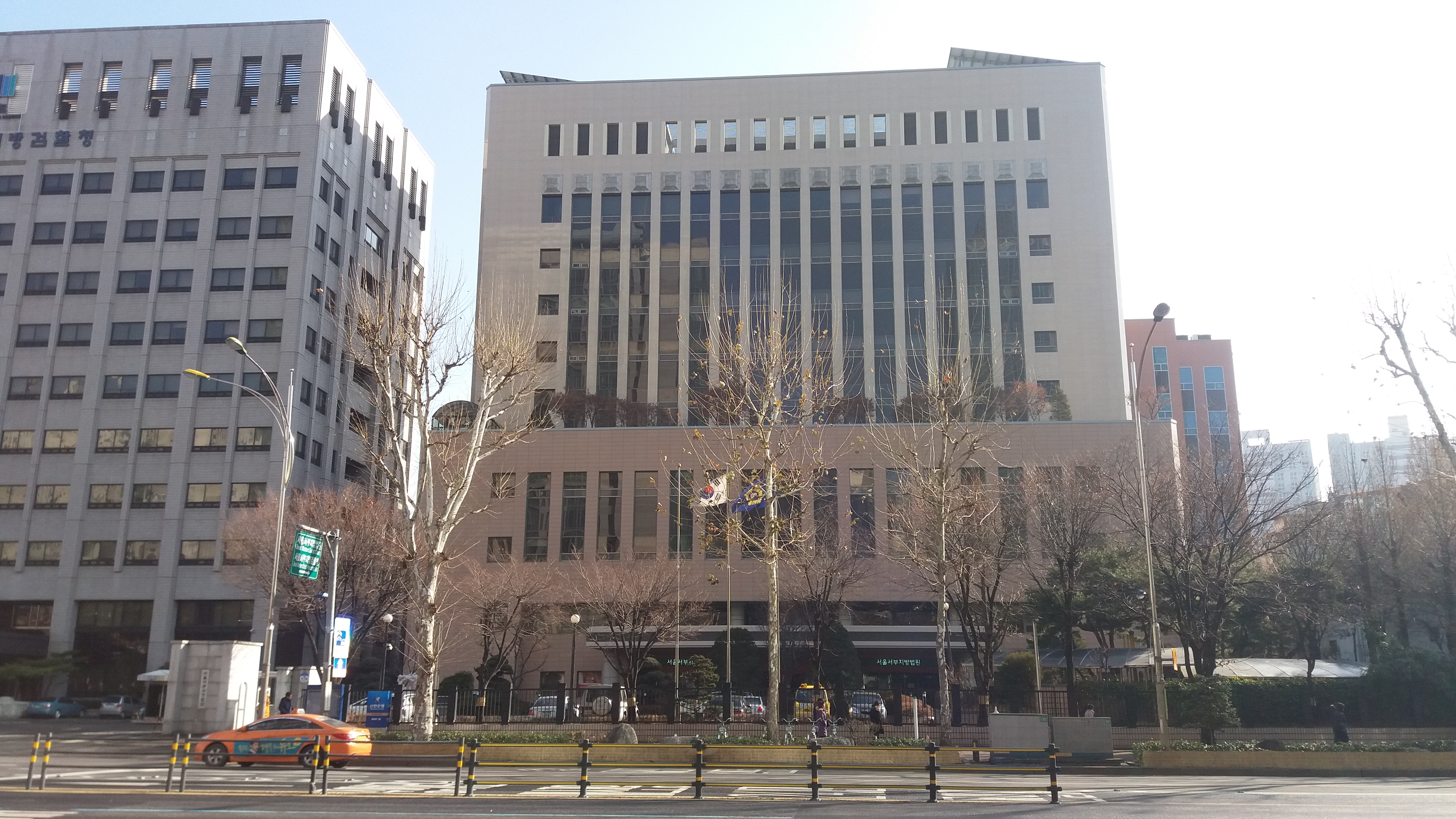
- The Seoul Western District Court in 2017
- Date: 19 January 2025 c. 03:00 to 06:08 (UTC+09:00)
- Location: Seoul Western District Court, Mapo District, South Korea
- Caused by: far-right opposition to arrest warrant of Yoon Suk Yeol
- Goals: Judicial intimidation
- Methods: Rioting; far-right terrorism
- Result: Attack unsuccessful: Insurrection suppressed; Injuries among the police officers and journalists; Damage of Seoul Western District Court

Parties
Pro-Yoon and right-wing movements Political support: People Power Party	Seoul Western District Court; Korean National Police Agency; Supreme Prosecutors' Office of the Republic of Korea; Corruption Investigation Office for High-ranking Officials

Casualties and losses
86 arrested	51 officers injured (7 gravely)

On 19 January 2025, at 03:00 Korea Standard Time (KST), supporters of the impeached president of South Korea, Yoon Suk Yeol, broke and entered through a window into the Seoul Western District Court to protest the formal arrest warrant that extended the previous detainment warrant for up to 20 days pending the prosecutors' decision on indictment. The protesters injured several police officers and attacked journalists. By 06:08, the police announced they had restored order.

On 19 January, the Supreme Prosecutors' Office announced the formation of a special investigation team and stated that those involved would be taken into custody for questioning. On 20 January, the Judiciary Committee and the Public Administration and Security Committee at the National Assembly addressed the incident during a legislative inquiry into pending issues.

== Background ==
Yoon Suk Yeol was summoned three times by the Corruption Investigation Office for High-ranking Officials (CIO) for questioning on 18 December, 25 December and 29 December over his declaration of martial law. He ignored all three summonses. In response, on 30 December, the CIO filed an arrest warrant for Yoon at the Seoul Western District Court. The warrant was granted by the court the next day.

On 3 January, investigators from the CIO attempted to serve the warrant; however, Yoon resisted the first joint detainment efforts by the CIO and police, under the protection of the Presidential Security Service (PSS). On 15 January, the CIO, with support from the police, made a second attempt to detain Yoon. Approximately six hours later, Yoon was detained.

On 18 January, Judge Cha Eun-kyung of the Seoul Western District Court issued a formal arrest warrant, extending Yoon's detention to up to 20 days pending the prosecutors' decision on indictment. The warrant was issued on the grounds that Yoon posed a risk of "destroying evidence" related to the investigation into his martial law declaration.

== Riot ==
On 18 January, Judge Cha Eun-kyung held a hearing with President Yoon Suk Yeol in connection with the CIO's arrest warrant application. During the proceedings, supporters of President Yoon gathered outside the courthouse, defied police orders to disperse, crossed police barricades, and unlawfully entered the premises. The protesters engaged in violent acts, including assaults on law enforcement officers and journalists, resulting in the arrest of 40 individuals. According to the police report, 22 individuals unlawfully entered the Western District courthouse, 10 damaged CIO vehicles, seven assaulted law enforcement officers, one assaulted journalists, and 17 climbed over the courthouse wall.

At 03:00 on 19 January, Judge Cha issued the arrest warrant. In response, pro-Yoon supporters broke through police lines, shattered windows, and forcibly entered the courthouse, causing damage to its exterior walls and windows with rocks.

At 03:21, inside the courthouse, the protesters caused a disturbance by discharging fire extinguishers. Pro-Yoon supporters vandalized CCTV cameras and invited others inside, using inflammatory language such as "Get all the communist judges!" as they entered through broken windows. Chanting slogans like "President Yoon" and "Reject the warrant," they threw fire extinguishers, monitors, flowerpots, signs, and other objects within reach. Some trespassers actively searched for the presiding judge, shouting, "Cha Eun-kyung, where are you, huh?" while roaming the building armed with metal pipes and wooden objects. They also hurled ashtrays at law enforcement and seized riot shields.

On 23 January, video footage surfaced showing two protestors attempting to light the building on fire. They punctured a can of oil, poured its contents inside the court building through a broken window, and attempted to ignite the oil by dropping a lit piece of paper through the same broken window before retreating. It remains unclear whether the ignition was successful. One of the men involved in the attempted arson was arrested three days after the riot.

Pro-Yoon supporters wielding metal pipes searched for Judge Cha Eun-kyung, making their way up to the seventh through ninth floors where the judges' offices were located. They kicked the doors of each judge's office and shouted, "Where is she?" as they conducted their search. At the time, Judge Cha Eun-kyung had already left the courthouse. After police lines were breached, approximately 20 security personnel and staff members fled the riot to the eighth and eleventh floors and the rooftop. One staff member who sought refuge reported, "It was terrifying that their eyes did not look normal."

At 03:32, the police deployed a large-scale tactical unit and issued repeated warnings of arrest to the protesters. The protesters ignored the warnings and threatened police officers with stolen riot shields and fragments of wall tiles.

Around 04:00, protesters were pushed back to the rear gate but regained ground 10 minutes later. They resisted by throwing tile fragments.

Protesters heckled a sophomore student bystander, accusing her of being Chinese, but her father intervened.

At 06:08, police declared that "order has been completely restored around the Western District Court". They arrested 46 trespassing rioters, bringing the total number of arrests over the two days to 86, including the 40 previously made.

== Reactions ==
Yoon's criminal defense attorney Suk Dong-hyun said "expressing anger is understandable, but if it escalates into excessive violence, there is a risk of becoming entangled in targeted offensives or counterstrategies by leftist groups". People Power Party lawmaker Yoon Sang-hyun messaged 40 detained Yoon supporters to reassure them, saying "You will be released soon after the investigation".

On 19 January, Judge Cha Eun-kyung, who had issued the formal arrest warrant for President Yoon, requested personal protection. In response, on 20 January, the police assigned a security detail to Judge Cha.

On 22 January, acting president Choi Sang-mok ordered a 24-hour police presence at the Constitutional Court of Korea and other courts nationwide in response to the riot and other incidents of political tension related to Yoon's impeachment.

On 1 August 2025, the Seoul Western District Court convicted 49 people for participating in the riot and sentenced them to up to five years' imprisonment.

== See also ==
- 2019 South Korean National Assembly attack
- 2021 United States Capitol Riot
