= Arrest of Yoon Suk Yeol =

2025 arrest of the South Korean president

- Part of the aftermath of the 2024 South Korean martial law crisis
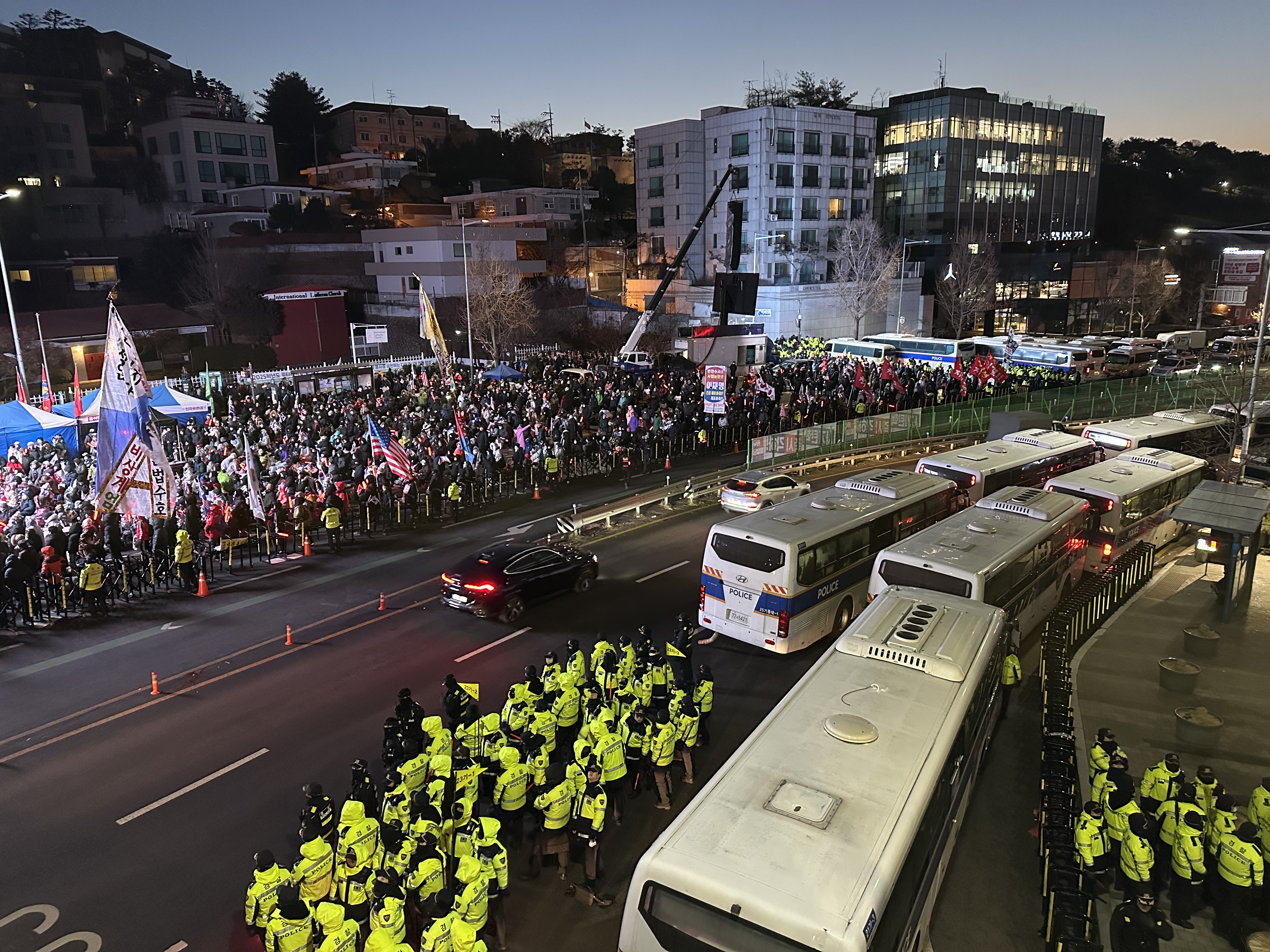
- Pro-Yoon protestors (top left) and police (in yellow) at the front entrance to Yoon's residence (top center) hours before Yoon's first successful arrest
- Date: Since warrant issued: 30 December 2024 – 15 January 2025; (2 weeks and 2 days); Arrests: First attempt: 3 January 2025; Second attempt: 15 January 2025
- Location: Hannam-dong, Yongsan, Seoul, South Korea
- Caused by: Yoon Suk Yeol's role in the 2024 South Korean martial law crisis; Yoon Suk Yeol's refusal to attend three court summons issued by the Corruption Investigation Office for High-ranking Officials (CIO); Yoon Suk Yeol's self-confinement to his presidential residence and alleged incitement of supporters in public addresses
- Goals: Arrest of Yoon Suk Yeol; Further investigation of potential insurrection charges
- Result: Failure of initial raid due to resistance from the Presidential Security Service; Several violent clashes between pro-Yoon and anti-Yoon demonstrators; Successful arrest of Yoon on 15 January 2025 following second attempt

Parties
- Yoon allies
- Presidential Office
  - Presidential Security Service (PSS)
    - 55th Security Brigade
- Political support:
- People Power Party (PPP)
- Corruption Investigation Office for High-ranking Officials (CIO)
- National Police Agency (KNPA)
- Supreme Prosecutors' Office (SPO)
- Political support:
- Democratic Party (DP)

Lead figures
Yoon Suk Yeol; Park Jong-jun	Oh Dong-woon

Number
First attempt: ~200 presidential personnel	First attempt: 150 personnel; Second attempt: 1,000 personnel

Beginning on 3 January 2025, South Korean authorities attempted to arrest Yoon Suk Yeol, president of South Korea at the time. Yoon had confined himself at his official presidential residence since his impeachment on 14 December 2024. The arrest warrant, granted on 31 December by the Seoul Western District Court, stemmed from investigations into Yoon's martial law declaration on 3 December, as well as his refusal to attend any of the three summons demanded by the Corruption Investigation Office for High-ranking Officials (CIO). On 15 January 2025, after an infiltration of his residence, Yoon handed himself over to the CIO, ending the arrest effort.

The initial and unsuccessful arrest operation on 3 January resulted in a complex security standoff at his presidential residence in Hannam-dong, Yongsan, Seoul, involving multiple security forces and lasting several hours. After roughly six hours of confrontation at Yoon's residence, the CIO suspended their operations, citing safety concerns for personnel. It was unsuccessful mainly due to resistance from the Presidential Security Service and legal objections from Yoon's defense lawyers. The arrest warrant and raid marked the first arrest of a sitting president in the nation's history.

On 10 July 2025, three months after Yoon's 4 April removal from office, the Seoul Central District Court issued an arrest warrant for Yoon, this time in his capacity as the former president, due to loss of immunity stipulated in Article 84 of Constitution of South Korea. The arrest related to five key charges related to the imposition of the short-lived martial law, the grounds for arrest were obstruction of special official duties, violation of the Presidential Security Act, obstruction of the exercise of rights by abuse of power, and creation of false official documents. Yoon remains in custody as of 14 June 2026, and was sentenced to life imprisonment in 2026 for orchestrating an insurrection.

== Background ==
On 3 December 2024, at 10:27 pm Korea Standard Time (KST), Yoon Suk Yeol, the president of South Korea, declared martial law during a televised address. In his declaration, Yoon accused the Democratic Party (DPK), which has a majority in the National Assembly, of conducting "anti-state activities" and collaborating with "North Korean communists" to destroy the country, thereby creating a "legislative dictatorship". The order prohibited political activities, including gatherings of the National Assembly and local legislatures, and suspended the free press. Separately, Yoon reportedly ordered the arrest of various political opponents, including the leaders of the DPK and his own People Power Party (PPP).

Military and police forces attempted to prevent legislators from entering the National Assembly Proceeding Hall, causing clashes between the security forces, protesters, and legislative aides. All 190 legislators who were present in the chamber unanimously voted to demand the lifting of martial law, forcing Yoon to lift martial law around 4:00 am KST on 4 December.

As a result, Yoon was impeached on 14 December by the National Assembly and suspended from office pending a final ruling by the Constitutional Court on whether to confirm his removal from the presidency. Prime Minister Han Duck-soo briefly served as acting president until he was also impeached on 27 December, making Finance Minister and Deputy Prime Minister Choi Sang-mok acting president.

== Investigation and arrest warrant ==
On 11 December 2024, South Korean police raided the Office of the President of the Republic of Korea, with investigators presenting a search warrant specifying Yoon as the suspect. However, the Presidential Security Service refused to cooperate, resulting in a "very limited" number of documents and materials being submitted by Yoon's office. Raids were also conducted on the Defense Counterintelligence Command, the Army Special Warfare Command, the Seoul Metropolitan Police Agency, the National Police Agency, and the National Assembly Security Service. On the same day, the former Defense Minister Kim Yong-hyun attempted to commit suicide at the detention facility while in custody.

On 12 December, the police raided the Joint Chiefs of Staff headquarters adjacent to the presidential compound, as well as the Capital Defense Command headquarters. On 13 December police raided the Gyeonggi Nambu Provincial Police headquarters to investigate the unit's role during martial law. Gyeonggi Nambu Provincial Police had dispatched police forces to the NEC after Yoon's declaration of martial law.

Following his impeachment on 14 December, Yoon confined himself in his presidential residence in Hannam-dong, Yongsan, central Seoul.

On 27 December the National Assembly voted 191–71 to create a special committee to investigate insurrection charges against Yoon, with a tenure lasting until 13 February 2025. The committee was formally opened on 31 December and was composed of 18 lawmakers, including 10 opposition and seven PPP lawmakers and one independent lawmaker.

Yoon was summoned three times by the Corruption Investigation Office for High-ranking Officials (CIO) for questioning on 18 December, 25 December and 29 December over his declaration of martial law. He ignored all three summons. In response, on 30 December, the CIO filed an arrest warrant for Yoon at the Seoul Western District Court. The warrant was granted by the court the next day. The arrest warrant, valid for seven days up to 6 January 2025, allowed investigators multiple attempts to detain Yoon if initial efforts proved unsuccessful. If detained, the anti-corruption agency would have 48 hours to request a formal arrest warrant, or else have to release him. Yoon's legal team announced their intention to pursue legal action, characterizing the warrant's execution as "illegal and invalid" by asserting that the CIO did not have the authority to issue the warrant.

=== Reactions to Yoon's arrest warrant ===
During the arrest operation, Democratic Party floor leader Park Chan-dae stated that Yoon "...must pay the price for his crime of trying to start a war by ordering (during martial law), 'tear down the door with an axe' and 'drag him out even if it means shooting him.'" and urged the People Power Party (PPP) to stop defending someone who "destroyed the constitutional order and democracy", warning that anyone who continued to defend him would "face the judgment of the people". Following the unsuccessful initial raid, Park called Yoon an "insurrection ringleader", and described his arrest as South Korea's "most urgent task" in order to prevent the economic and political fallout of the martial law crisis from further snowballing. He demanded the immediate arrest of all parties who obstructed the raid and any future attempts to arrest Yoon, deeming them "accomplices to insurrection".

=== Public demonstrations ===
Following the issuance of Yoon's arrest warrant on 31 December 2024 and Yoon's subsequent addresses to his supporters, thousands of protesters gathered near Hangangjin station to support Yoon amid temperatures dropping to −3 °C (27 °F), claiming his innocence and alleging electoral fraud in the previous April's general election. Supporters set up tea and snack stations near the protest site. Several pro-Yoon supporters waved American and South Korean flags during the rallies, and shouted slogans including "We will protect President Yoon Suk Yeol!" and "Nullify the impeachment!". During this period, Yoon maintained communication with supporters through public statements, watching their protests via YouTube livestreams. Several demonstrators maintained an overnight vigil on the night of 2–3 January, conducting prayer sessions in the street before the main protests began.

On 1 January 2025, Yoon released a statement to his supporters claiming, "The Republic of Korea is currently in danger due to internal and external forces threatening its sovereignty," and vowed to "fight alongside you to the very end to protect this nation." Opposition lawmakers criticized this message as inflammatory, with Democratic Party spokesperson Jo Seoung-lae describing Yoon as "delusional" and accusing him of attempting to incite confrontations.

By 9:30 am on 3 January, unofficial police estimates placed the crowd at approximately 1,200 people. Law enforcement deployed about 2,700 police officers, 135 police buses, and several specialized units in order to prevent potential clashes between pro-Yoon and anti-Yoon demonstrators, following confrontations between the two parties the previous day. Violent clashes occurred between rival parties outside the presidential compound, with some pro-Yoon supporters physically blocking access to the residence. Bae Hoon, a 46-year-old anti-Yoon protester, reported that demonstrators were "hit and assaulted multiple times by those waving national flags." Several pro-Yoon supporters lay down on a road leading to the presidential residence, with Korean officers removing them. Several protesters beat large drums and chanted slogans such as "Arrest the Supreme Prosecutors' Office!", "We won!", "Cheer up, Yoon Suk Yeol!", or "Cheer up, Presidential Security Service!"

Democratic Party floor leader Park Chan-dae accused Yoon of "watching far-right YouTube videos at the presidential residence for a month and inciting far-right forces", regarding the response of Yoon's supporters.

== First arrest attempt ==
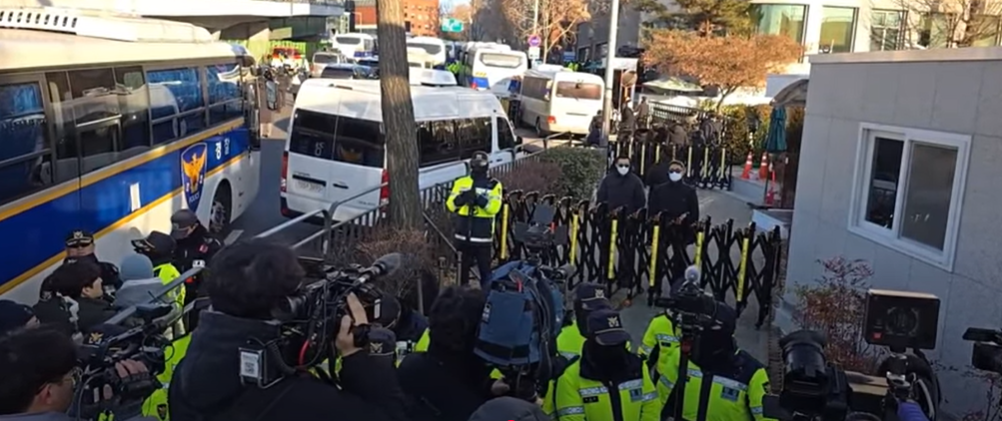
First arrest attempt, police guard the entrance to Yoon's residence while reporters observe (3 January 2025)

In the early morning hours of 3 January, investigators from the CIO, accompanied by police forces, entered Yoon's presidential residence to execute the arrest warrant. The arrest team was reported to have comprised about 150 personnel, with 30 members from the Supreme Prosecutors' Office and 120 from the special police unit. Of these, 80 personnel (30 prosecutors and 50 police officers) entered the residence grounds, while 70 additional police officers remained on standby outside, with some reinforcements arriving later. Yoon had reportedly been isolated since 14 December, following the impeachment proceedings. Extensive barricades and vehicle restrictions were enacted in the Hannam-dong area in advance of the operation.

The operation began around 7:00 am local time. Investigators breached initial security barriers, but were stopped at the residence entrance by Chief of Presidential Security Service Park Jong-jun, who refused access. The Presidential Security Service cited two articles in South Korea's Criminal Procedure Act regarding the protection of official secrets to justify blocking access to investigators. The CIO chief Oh Dong-woon warned that attempts to obstruct Yoon's arrest could result in additional prosecutions. Democratic Party floor leader Park Chan-dae stated that any attempts to obstruct the arrest operation would be charged with complicity in sedition and obstruction of their duties.

At 8:02 am, two bulletproof vehicles reportedly exclusively used by Yoon and the first lady were captured on video leaving his residence. It was later speculated that Yoon fled the premises using these vehicles.

At 9:54 am local time, Yonhap reported that prosecutors had broken through military service units blocking the residence, including the 55th Security Brigade of the Army Defense Command, which maintained the second line of defense. Regular soldiers from the Defense Command had also been deployed to impede the arrest warrant's execution. Multiple members of Yoon's legal team entered his residence, and mounted several legal challenges to the arrest warrant. They argued that the warrant could not be enforced at the presidential residence, citing laws protecting locations containing military secrets from searches without proper consent. The lawyers also questioned the CIO's authority to investigate "rebellion charges" and disputed police officers' legal right to assist in the detention operation.

According to media reports, investigators faced a human wall of approximately 200 presidential personnel and experienced "various small and large scuffles" during their attempts to execute the arrest warrant. The CIO said investigators reached to within 200 meters of Yoon's residential quarters before they were blocked. After roughly six hours of confrontation at Yoon's residence, the CIO suspended their operations. Authorities stated afterwards "We determined that executing the detention warrant would be practically impossible due to the continued confrontation and suspended the execution out of concern for the safety of on-site personnel caused by the resistance."

On 4 January, investigators asked acting president Choi Sang-mok to order the presidential security service to allow Yoon to be arrested.

On 9 January, it was reported that the National Investigation Headquarters would assemble 1,000 officers in the next arrest attempt.

On 10 January, the head of the Presidential Security Service Park Jong-jun resigned. Park had been summoned to the National Investigation Headquarters of the National Police Agency for questioning on charges of obstruction of official duties by preventing the arrest of the impeached president.

=== Reactions to the first arrest attempt ===
Kim Byung-joo accused the Presidential Security Service of participating in "a second insurrection" by preventing Yoon's arrest.

Concurrent with the first arrest attempt, Army Chief Park An-su, who had served as martial law commander during Yoon's December declaration, and military official Kwak Jong-geun were indicted on insurrection charges.

The interim leader of the PPP, Kwon Young-se, supported the suspension of the attempted arrests and advocated for further investigation without detention of Yoon.

North Korea's state media characterized South Korea as being in "chaos" and politically paralyzed, publishing its commentary about the situation in the Rodong Sinmun newspaper. The North Korean coverage emphasized the "unprecedented impeachment" and subsequent political turmoil, and referred to South Korean institutions as puppets of the United States.

== Second arrest attempt ==
On 14 January, a military unit assigned to guard the residence's exterior approved the entry of anti-corruption officials and police to arrest Yoon. The Presidential Security Service denied the military unit's approval, stating that it had no authority to allow access to Yoon's residence without the main service's secondary approval.

Map of the area around Yoon's residence during the arrest.

In the early morning of 15 January, the CIO, with support from the police, made a second attempt to arrest Yoon. The National Police Agency stated that they had organized approximately 1,000 personnel drawn from multiple jurisdictions to execute the arrest warrant. These included 301 detectives from the Seoul Metropolitan Police Agency's Metropolitan Investigation Unit, 270 personnel from the Gyeonggi Southern Provincial Police Agency with experience in the Anti-Corruption Investigation Unit, the Mobile Criminal Investigation Unit, and the Narcotics Crime Investigation Unit, and additional personnel from the Gyeonggi Northern Provincial Police Agency and Incheon Regional Investigation Units. These personnel would be divided into three groups: the entry team tasked with removing physical barriers and securing access to the presidential residence, the arrest team responsible for apprehending President Yoon, Deputy PSS Chief Kim Sung-ho, and any PSS agents who might resist the operation, and the escort team responsible for safely transporting detained individuals from the scene. Multiple detention facilities were prepared across police stations for resisting security personnel. The operation was planned to be initiated at 5:00 am KST on 15 January, with a long-term dispatch period extending to 17 January. The operation was intended to involve mechanical equipment such as cranes and tow trucks for removing physical barriers, riot police deployments for crowd control, and psychological warfare that included loudspeaker announcements offering leniency to cooperating security personnel.

Pro-Yoon protestors chant slogans to music while police buses arrive for the second arrest attempt (3:02 am KST)

At 4:20 am on 15 January, CIO officials arrived at Yoon's residence. A police line moved towards the residence, broadcasting messages warning that any personnel who obstructed the arrest operation would be arrested. Six layers of physical barricades had been assembled by the PSS outside the residence. About 30 members of the People Power Party along with lawyers Yoon Gap-geun and Kim Hong-il formed a human chain in front of the residence to prevent entry. Yoon Gap-geun called the operation "illegal" and an "internal rebellion". Deputy PSS Chief Kim Sung-ho, who also received an arrest warrant, had his radio communication with other secret service members cut off. Several personnel employed ladders to scale buses that had been positioned as barriers at the entrance, and used bolt cutters to breach barbed wire fortifications. Some officers scaled walls and utilized nearby hiking trails to access the compound from behind the main security buildup.

=== Successful arrest ===
Pro-Yoon protestors push the police barrier back to block the road (8:34 am KST)

At 10:33 am, the Supreme Prosecutors' Office announced that it had arrested President Yoon. Shortly before his arrest, Yoon released a three-minute video statement announcing his decision to cooperate with investigators in order to "prevent any unsavoury bloodshed" after watching authorities "invade" the residence's security barriers. He maintained the position that his arrest warrant was not legally valid, and claimed that South Korea's rule of law had "completely collapsed". Yoon's legal team filed an objection to the court requesting that the execution of the arrest and search warrant be denied, but it was dismissed on 5 January. The head of the Court Administration Office publicly stated that the mainstream view in the courts is that the arrest was legal.

Democratic Party floor leader Park Chan-dae described the successful second arrest attempt as "the first step" toward returning South Korea to democracy and its constitutional order, while representing that "justice in South Korea is alive."

=== Extension of Yoon's detention ===
On 18 January, Judge Cha Eun-kyung of the Seoul Western District Court issued a formal arrest warrant, extending Yoon's detention from 48 hours to up to 20 days pending the prosecutors' decision on the indictment. The warrant was issued on the grounds that Yoon posed a risk of "destroying evidence" related to the investigation into his martial law declaration.

However, following the announcement, supporters of Yoon gathered outside the courthouse and protested the issuance of an arrest warrant for him in the early next morning, and broke into the court at 3:21 a.m., vandalizing offices, and causing property damage, including attacks on vehicles of Corruption Investigation Office for High-ranking Officials. A total of 86 individuals were arrested for various offenses, including assaulting police officers, attacking a journalist, unlawfully entering the courthouse, and damaging its facilities. The arrests occurred amid a crowd of 44,000 supporters of Yoon who had assembled outside the courthouse.

After a physical examination, Yoon had a mug shot taken, put on a khaki two-piece uniform, and was placed in a 12-square-meter solitary cell, which is larger than the average 3.4-square-meter cell. As a pre-trial detainee, Yoon was scheduled to wake up with other inmates at 6:30 a.m., with his curfew being set at 9 p.m.

== Aftermath ==
Following his arrest and interrogation, authorities planned to detain Yoon at the Seoul Detention Center in Uiwang, Gyeonggi Province, located approximately five kilometers from the CIO office. Under South Korean law, authorities had 48 hours to secure a detention warrant, without which Yoon would be released. He was also placed in solitary confinement. An interrogation began at 11:00 am at the Gwacheon Government Complex, where Yoon was questioned in the presence of his defense attorney, Yoon Gap-geun. Security Service personnel were deployed throughout the Corruption Investigation Office building. Deputy Chief Prosecutor Lee Jae-seung conducted the initial two-and-a-half-hour interrogation session, followed by Chief Prosecutor Lee Dae-hwan after an hour-long break. The prosecutors prepared an extensive 200-page questionnaire for the investigation. However, Yoon reportedly refused to provide verbal responses or written statements to the prosecutors' questions. The process was not recorded due to Yoon's refusal to consent to video documentation.

Yoon's staff released a "Letter to the People" to his Facebook account following the arrest, which had reportedly been written by him on paper earlier in 2025. Much of the letter focused on Yoon's justifications for declaring martial law, allegations of potential voting fraud and systemic vulnerabilities in South Korea's electoral system, emphasizing the successes of his policies, and his commitment to liberal democracy and individual freedoms against totalitarianism and tyranny of the majority.

On 15 January, Yoon's criminal defense team filed a petition for a habeas corpus review with the Seoul Central District Court; however, on 16 January, the court denied the petition. On 16 January, his team filed an insurrection complaint against CIO chief Oh Dong-woon, National Office of Investigation head Woo Jong-soo, and several others over Yoon's arrest.

On 17 January, acting PSS chief Kim Seong-hoon was detained on suspicion of helping block Yoon's arrest.

On 19 January, the CIO banned Yoon from receiving visitors in detention apart from his lawyers. The ban on visits includes Kim Keon-hee and his family, and the CIO intended to prepare for the possibility that Yoon may file a petition with the court. The ban was lifted on 24 January.

On 23 January, the CIO recommended that Yoon be charged with "leading an insurrection and abuse of power".

On 24 January, the Seoul Central District Court dismissed a request by prosecutors to extend Yoon's detention until 6 February, citing lack of probable cause to continue the investigation under the prosecution's authority following the referral of the case by the CIO.

On 26 January, Yoon was formally indicted on charges of leading an insurrection in connection with his imposition of martial law. The case was assigned by the Seoul Central District Court to its criminal collegiate division 25, which also handles martial law-related criminal charges against former defense minister Kim Yong-hyun, former national police commissioner Cho Ji-ho, and former Seoul Metropolitan Police Agency chief Kim Bong-sik.

On 4 February, Yoon's defense team requested the court to cancel his arrest.

On 8 February, police launched an investigation after details of a plot to stage a mob attack on the Constitutional Court hearing Yoon's impeachment trial emerged online.

On 6 November, the PSS issued an official apology for obstructing Yoon's arrest.

== Court hearings ==
=== Impeachment trial ===
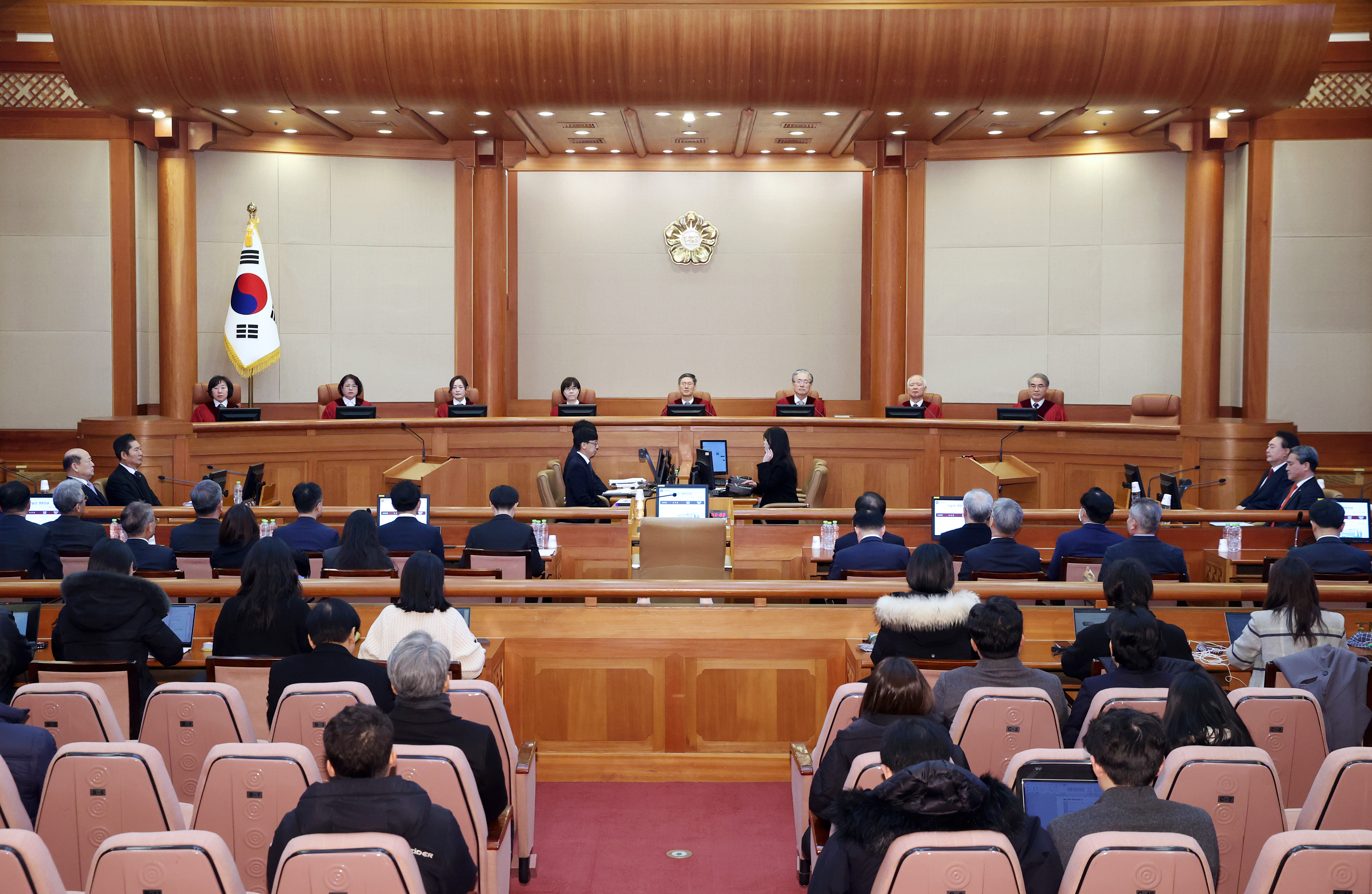
Yoon present at the 6th hearing of impeachment trial at the Constitutional Court on 7 February 2025

The court held its first preparatory hearing on Yoon's case on 20 February, which lasted only 13 minutes. There was heavy security around the court building, following the Seoul Western District Court riot. Yoon's lawyer, Kim Hong-il, condemned the arrest against Yoon, stating the declaration of martial law was "not intended to paralyse the state" and it had been meant to "alert the public to the national crisis caused by the legislative dictatorship of the dominant opposition party." The court's acting chief justice, Moon Hyung-bae, said the next court hearing would be held on 25 February, and another is scheduled for 24 March.

Han Duck-soo also had a court hearing the same day. "I am deeply burdened by the despair that each and every one of our people felt due to such extreme politics that took place before, during and after emergency martial law," Han stated in court. "All procedures dealing with the emergency martial law must be carried out fairly and reasonably so that there is no further spark of the national division."

The court upheld the impeachment of Yoon in a unanimous 8–0 decision on 4 April, removing Yoon from office.

=== Insurrection trial ===
Yoon's trial on charges of insurrection began on 14 April. He attended the fifth hearing of the trial on 26 May, and he refused to respond to any questions from the press.

On 19 February 2026, Yoon was found guilty of insurrection and was sentenced to life in prison.

== Release and concerns ==
Yoon was released from the Seoul Detention Center on 8 March after the prosecutor-general chose not to appeal court orders canceling his detention. The Democratic Party subsequently chided the prosecution as "one of Yoon's henchmen." The party then requested the resignation of Prosecutor General Shim Woo-jung for waiving the right to appeal the district court's decision to a higher court, calling the decision an "unacceptable display of leniency." However, the request was later rejected. On 12 March, the Chief Justice of Supreme Court of Korea, Chun Dae-yeop, announced his opinion that the release of Yoon Seok-yeol from detention was a special case, considering the more than 1,000 detention cancellation lawsuits filed every year. He recommended that the confusion in the "court precedents" regarding the issues in this case be resolved and that it be evaluated by a higher court.

On 10 July 2025, Yoon was rearrested on charges relating to his martial law declaration.

== Other legal investigations ==
On 12 December, in a plenary session, the National Assembly passed a bill calling for a special counsel probe into the insurrection charges against Yoon. On the same day, a special police investigation team and the Defense Ministry's investigation unit jointly raided the Defense Ministry and the Capital Defense Command, securing a "secret phone" of Kim Yong-hyun and the phone's server data. On 13 December, a court issued arrest warrants for KNP Commissioner Cho and Seoul Metropolitan Police Chief Kim, citing concerns over evidence tampering. That same day, Capital Defense Command head Lee Jin-woo was also arrested.

On 14 December, prosecutors arrested DCC chief, Lt Gen. Yeo In-hyung. On 16 December, police arrested Defense Intelligence Command chief Maj. Gen. Moon Sang-ho over his role in the NEC raid. His predecessor, Roh Sang-won was also arrested on suspicion of helping Yoon draft his martial law plans in a civilian capacity. That same day, a military court ordered the arrests of Lt. Gen. Kwak Jong-geun, former chief of the Special Warfare Command and Lt. Gen. Lee Jin-woo, former head of the Capital Defense Command. On 17 December, Park An-su was arrested following a warrant.

On 26 December, the defense ministry suspended Brig. Gen. Koo Sam-hoe, commander of the Army's 2nd Armored Brigade, and Brig. Gen. Bang Jeong-hwan, head of the ministry's operational control transition task force, for their role in the planning of martial law and Koo's attempts to mobilize a tank unit. On 27 December, the National Assembly voted 191–71 to create a special committee to investigate insurrection charges against Yoon, with a tenure lasting until 13 February 2025. The committee was opened on 31 December and was composed of 18 lawmakers: 10 opposition, seven PPP, and one independent. It was chaired by DPK MP Ahn Gyu-back, with Kim Sung-won as committee secretary for the PPP. Among the agencies to be called for questioning were the presidential office, the Office of National Security, the Presidential Security Service, the Prime Minister's Office, the Supreme Prosecutors Office, the defense, interior and justice ministries, the National Police Agency, the National Intelligence Service and the Defense Counterintelligence Command.

On 15 January 2025, former colonel Kim Yong-gun was arrested for allegedly plotting the martial law declaration with former Defense Minister Kim and former intelligence commander Roh Sang-won. He was indicted on abuse of power and obstruction of justice charges the same day. On 5 February, the National Assembly planned an on-site questioning session at the Seoul Dongbu Detention Center, aimed to directly question key figures involved in the martial law declaration; it was cancelled after Kim Yong-hyun refused to cooperate, insisting that he could not attend it due to "trial preparation". Kim had previously refused to attend any parliamentary hearings held by the special committee. Democratic party member Ahn Gyu-back apologized to the committee for Kim's behavior, and added that the committee would file a complaint against Kim for contempt of the Assembly at next week's plenary session. Democratic Party representative Han Byung-do voiced his annoyance: "Refusing to cooperate with the investigation is an outright rejection of the truth. If he is so confident and honorable, why can't he stand in front of the public?" Later that afternoon, lawmakers visited the Seoul Detention Center to hold another questioning session with President Yoon and Roh Sang-won; the session was cancelled when Yoon again declined to cooperate.

On 6 February, the defense ministry placed Yeo In-hyung, Lee Jin-woo, Kwak Jong-geun, and Moon Sang-ho on compulsory leave of absence following an ongoing criminal investigation against them over martial law. On 17 February, a criminal investigation into first lady Kim Keon-hee was called for alleged involvement in the martial law declaration to cover up election interference. On 21 February, Kim Yong-hyun applied for a suspension of execution in protest of the prosecution's sending of his prosecution's investigation records to the Constitutional Court, but it was rejected. On 28 May 2025, former Commander of the Defense Intelligence Command Roh Sang-won was indicted on bribery charges, which revealed that he, along with former Defense Minister Kim, were accepting bribes and valuables back in August 2024 from active-duty soldiers under the pretext of requesting promotions.

== See also ==
- Lee Myung-bak § Conviction and sentence
  - BBK stock price manipulation incident
- Roh Moo-hyun § Bribery allegations
