= Park Jong-jun =

South Korean politician (born 1964)

- 박종준
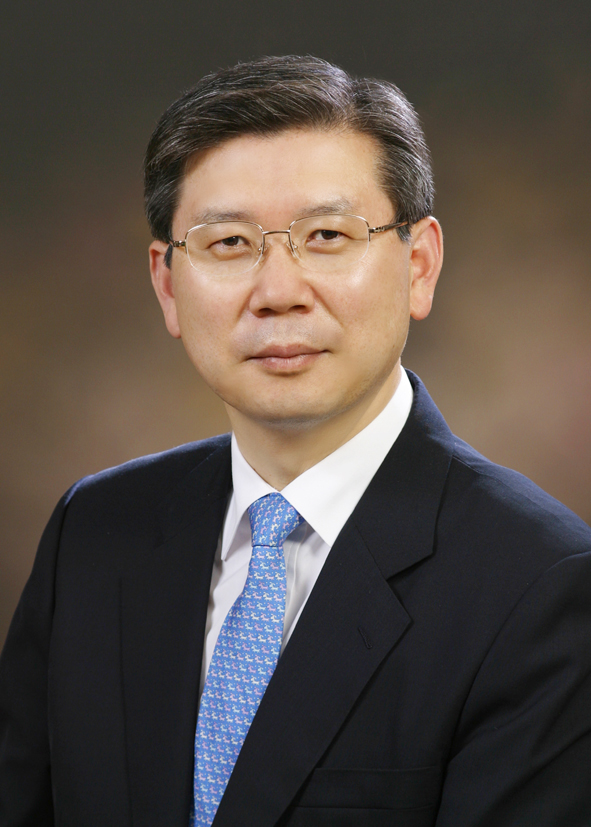
- Official portrait, 2016

Presidential Security Service
- In office 9 September 2024 – 10 January 2025

Personal details
- Born: November 10, 1964 (age 60); Gongju, South Korea
- Political party: People Power Party
- Education: Korean National Police University
- Occupation: Politician

Park Jong-jun (Korean: 박종준; born 10 November 1964) is a South Korean politician and former police officer who served as the head of the Presidential Security Service from 9 September 2024 to 10 January 2025, when he resigned from the position following his arrest for obstructing the execution of arrest of President Yoon Suk Yeol.

Park had been summoned to the National Investigation Headquarters of the National Police Agency for questioning on charges of obstruction of official duties by preventing the arrest of the impeached president.

== Early life and education ==
Park Jong-jun was born in 1964 at Gongju, South Korea. He graduated with top honours in 1986 at Korean National Police University.
