= Seoul Western District Court =

District court in Seoul, South Korea

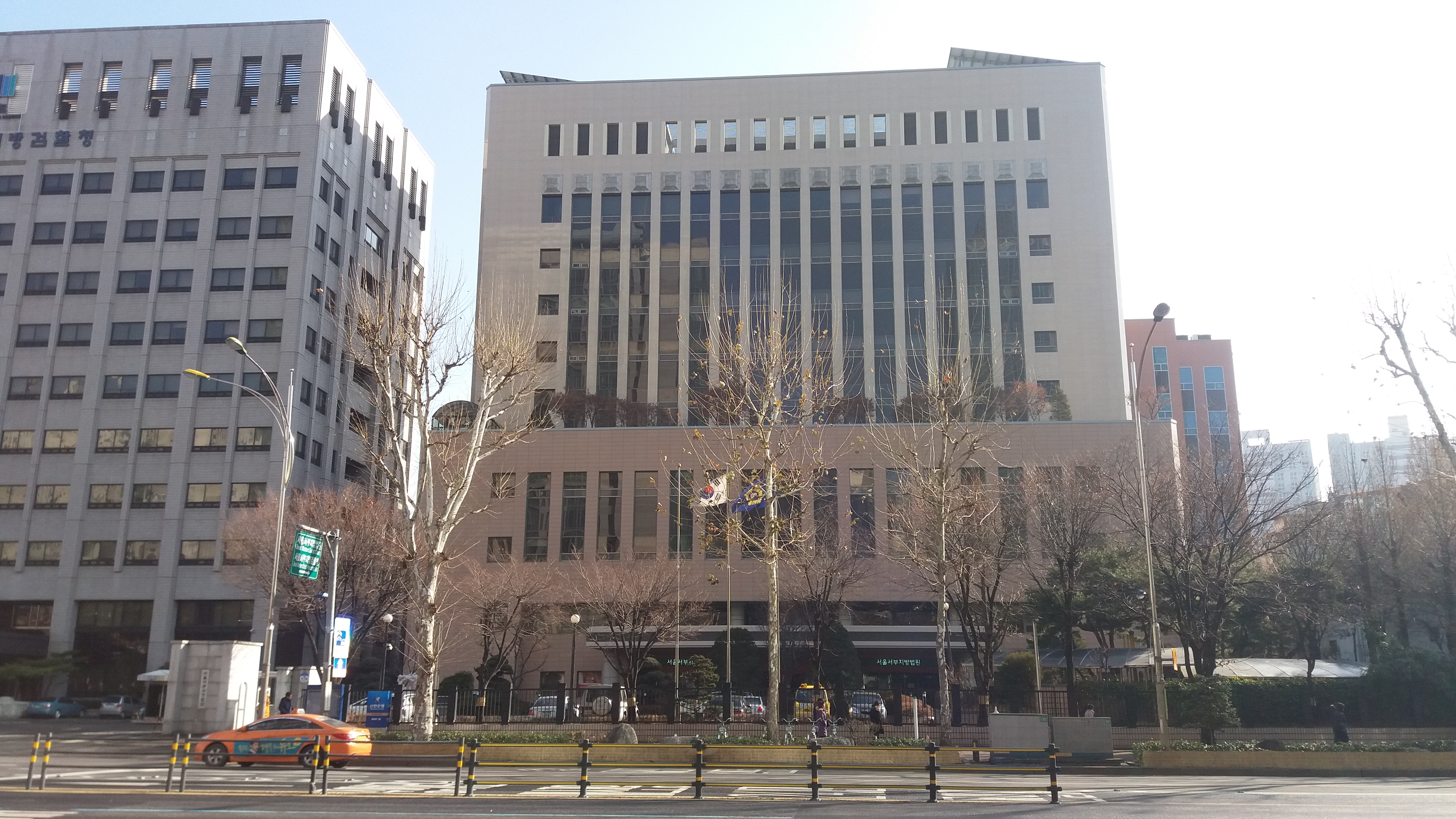
- The Seoul Western District Court in 2017
- Location: 174, Mapo-daero, Mapo-gu, Seoul, South Korea
- Website: http://slseobu.scourt.go.kr

The Seoul Western District Court (Korean: 서울서부지방법원) is a district court with jurisdiction over Mapo-gu, Seodaemun-gu, Eunpyeong-gu, and Yongsan-gu in Seoul, South Korea. It was established in 1989 as Seoul District Court Western Branch and was elevated to Seoul Western District Court in 2004.

== Major cases ==
In September 2006 and July 2007, the Islamic Republic of Iran Shipping Lines sued the KTC Korea Company in the court.

The court ruled that a hospital has an obligation to follow the request of a family to remove the respirator of a patient that is dependent on it. In the case, the court ruled that removing the respirator of a patient is not euthanasia, that removing a respirator does not infringe on a patient´s right to treatment, that the free will of the patient might have been respected, even without written consent, and that their decision does not concern the right of death of the patient.

On December 30, 2024, the Corruption Investigation Office for High-Ranking Officials filed for an arrest warrant for president Yoon Suk Yeol for abuse of authority and orchestrating a rebellion in the court, which was later granted. Yoon was the first sitting president of South Korea to be arrested.

== 2025 riot ==
On January 19, 2025, after the court issued a detention warrant issued because of the possibility that Yoon would destroy evidence, protesters rioted at the court. The protesters managed to get inside the court before damaging it. Nine police officers, and around 40 people in total, were injured in the riot. The police arrested nearly 90 of the protesters in the immediate aftermath of the riot. During the riot, over 40,000 gathered outside the court. 128 people were indicted and 18 people were found guilty in relation to the riot. In August 2026, the National Court Administration sued 5 people charged for taking part in the riot for ₩1.2 billion to repair damages caused during the riot. The National Court Administration stated that the riot caused major damage to the court, including broken windows, doors, office appliances, and computers. The National Court Administration´s lawsuit against the rioters was one of the few times the National Court Administration sued private individuals.
