= Impeachment of Yoon Suk Yeol =

2024 South Korean charging of president

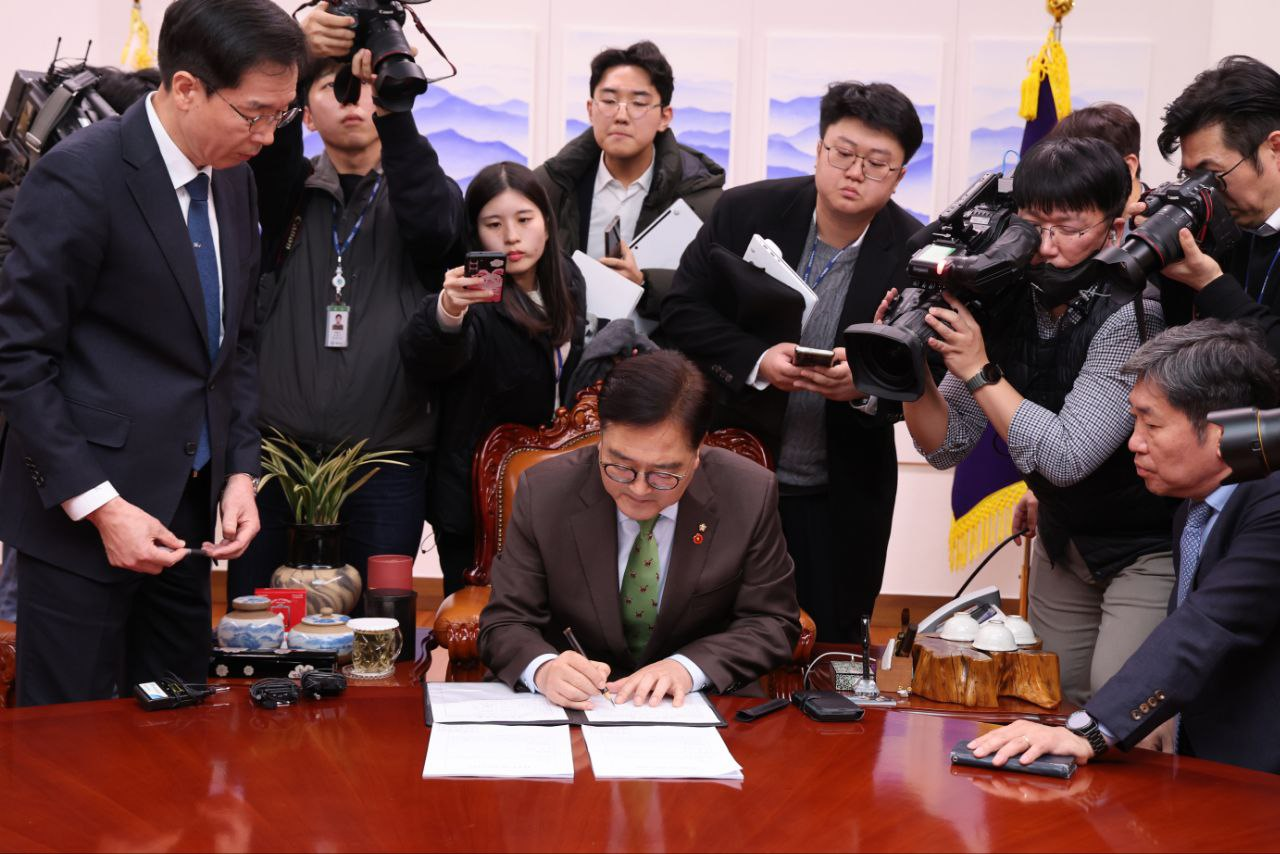
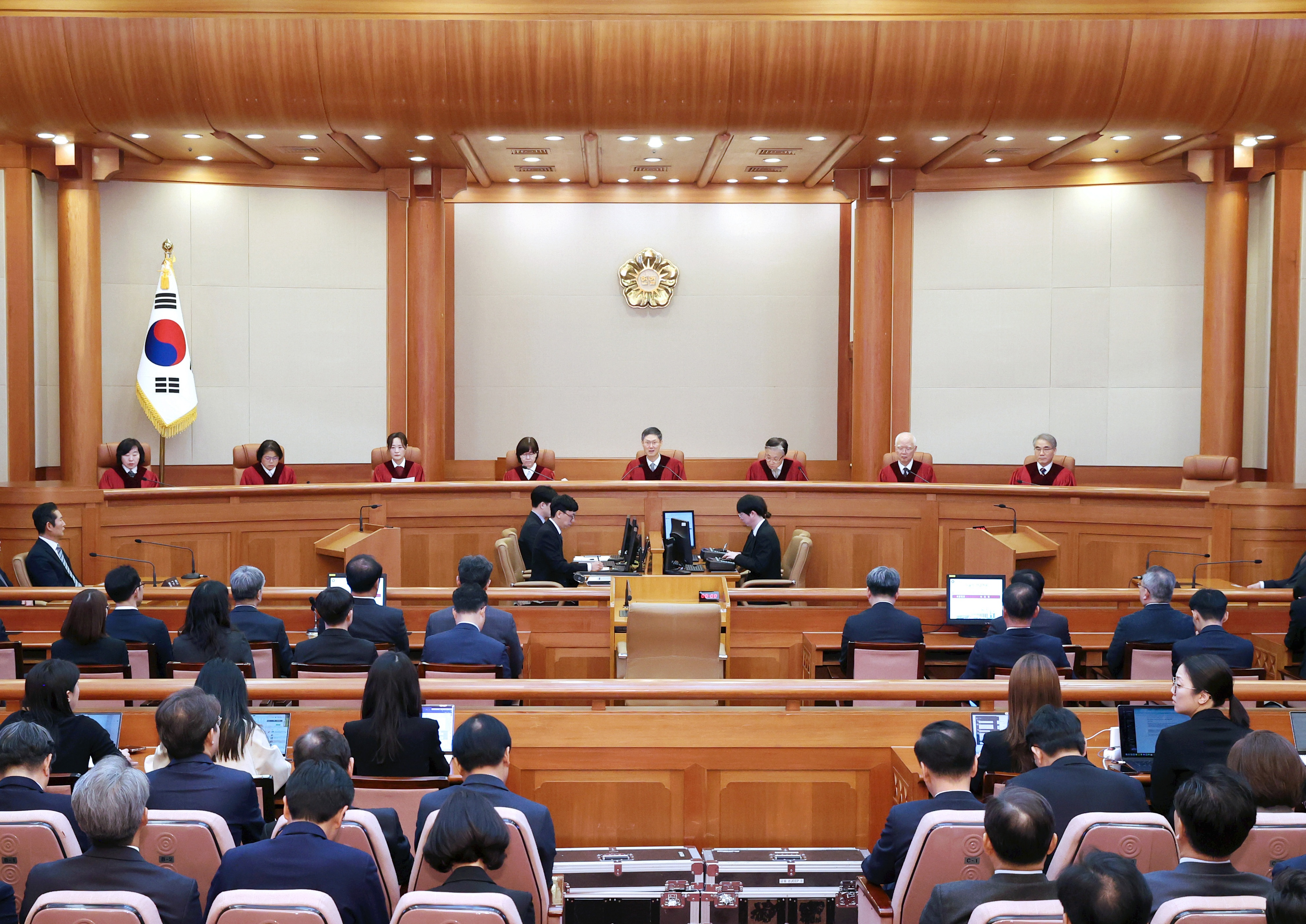
- Speaker of the National Assembly Woo Won-shik signing the article of impeachment after its passage in the National Assembly, 14 December 2024 Acting President of the Constitutional Court Moon Hyung-bae (center) announcing the court decision removing Yoon from office, 4 April 2025
- Accused: Yoon Suk Yeol, president of South Korea
- Date: Since initial motion: 4 December 2024 – 4 April 2025; Yoon's power suspension: 14 December 2024 – 4 April 2025
- Charges: Violation of principle of popular sovereignty; Obstruction of the exercise of rights; Obstruction of the performance of official duties; Abuse of power; Sedition
- Cause: Declaration of martial law

National Assembly votes

First impeachment motion 7 December 2024
- Present: 195 / 300 (65%)
- Not voting: 105 / 300 (35%)
- Result: Impeachment unsuccessful: Votes not counted due to failure to reach quorum amid People Power Party boycott

Second impeachment motion 14 December 2024
- Votes in favor: 204 / 300 (68%)
- Votes against: 85 / 300 (28%)
- Not voting: 11 / 300 (4%)
- Result: Impeachment successful: Yoon's presidential powers and duties were suspended for the duration of the impeachment trial; Prime Minister Han Duck-soo became acting president

Decision by Constitutional Court of Korea 4 April 2025
- Votes in favor: 8 / 8 (100%)
- Votes against: 0 / 8 (0%)
- Result: Impeachment upheld: Yoon removed from office; Snap presidential election was held in June 2025; Lee Jae-myung elected as president; Han continued his role as acting president until his own resignation on 1 May 2025; Yoon disqualified from holding public office in South Korea for five years
- National Assembly: 2206448; Constitutional Court: 2024헌나8

On 14 December 2024, Yoon Suk Yeol, then president of South Korea, was impeached by the National Assembly following the passage of an impeachment bill with 204 of the 300 members voting in favor. This action came in response to Yoon's declaration of martial law on 3 December 2024.

Prime Minister Han Duck-soo assumed the role of acting president pending the Constitutional Court's decision on whether to accept the impeachment. Han was himself impeached on 27 December 2024, and first deputy prime minister Choi Sang-mok became acting president. On 24 March 2025, Han was acquitted by the Constitutional Court and returned to the role of acting president.

The court upheld the impeachment of Yoon in a unanimous 8–0 decision on 4 April 2025, removing Yoon from office. Thus, Han continued as acting president until resigning, along with Choi, on 1 May 2025, which left second deputy prime minister Lee Ju-ho as acting president. The court determined that Yoon's five major illegal acts, including ordering the military and police to block lawmakers from entering the National Assembly, ordering the arrest of judges and Supreme Court justices, and illegally declaring martial law, were serious violations of the Constitution. Per the Constitution, a snap election was held on 3 June 2025, 60 days after Yoon's removal, with Lee Jae Myung being elected to succeed Yoon as president.

An earlier impeachment motion was put to a parliamentary vote on 7 December 2024, but failed because the number of attending legislators did not meet the quorum required for its passage, as members of the ruling People Power Party boycotted the vote.

Opinion polling on the Yoon Suk Yeol presidency throughout 2024 was increasingly negative. The declaration of martial law hardened these views, with many surveyed in South Korea believing Yoon should resign voluntarily, or that he should be formally removed from office.

== Background ==
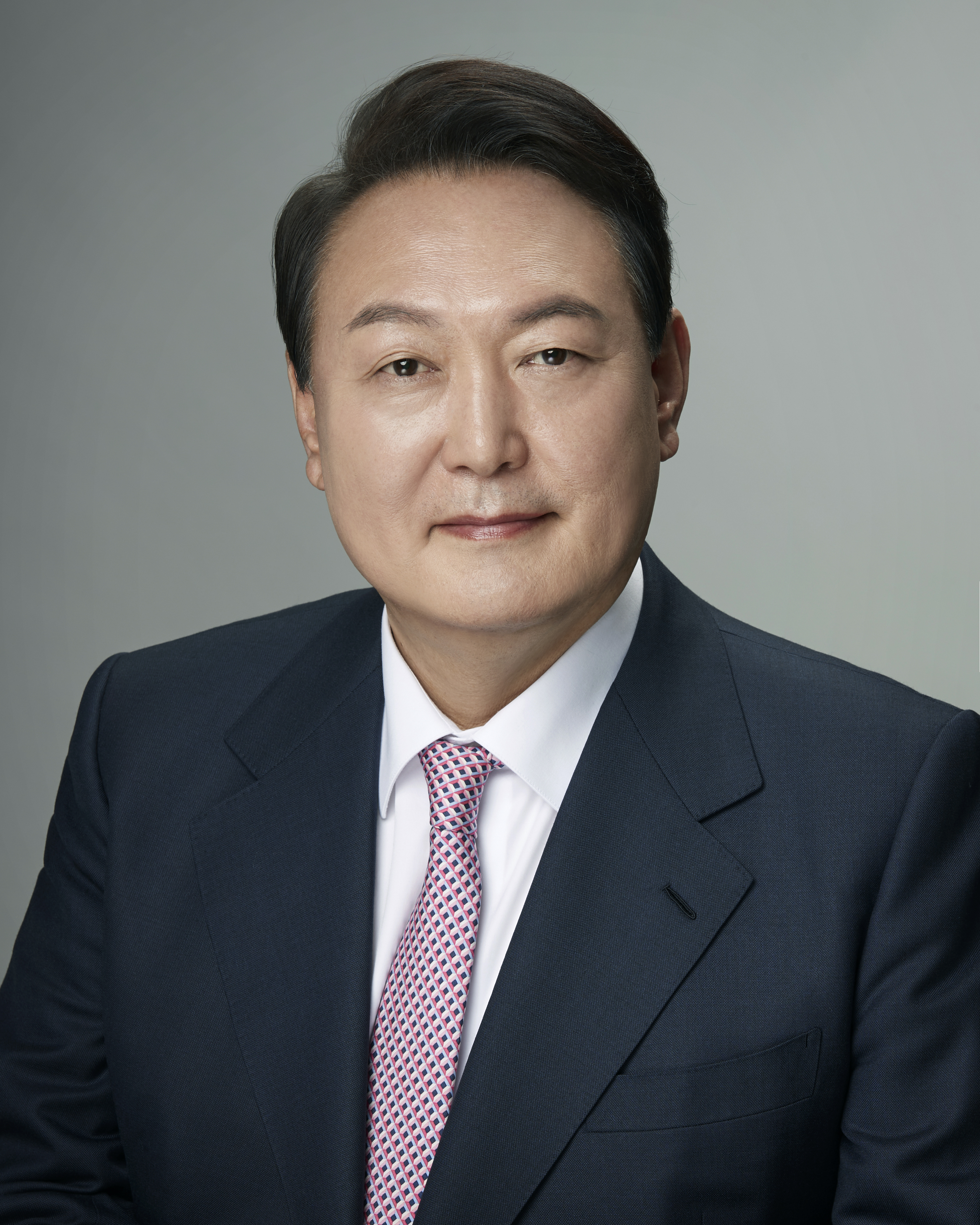
Yoon Suk Yeol in 2022

South Korea has been governed as a presidential democracy under the 1987 constitution, which provides for a strong independent executive. As a result, presidents can only be removed by a difficult impeachment process, rather than a simple vote of no confidence. Only one Korean president, Park Geun-hye, had previously been removed from office through impeachment, which occurred in 2017, also with a unanimous 8–0 decision of the Constitutional Court. Before being impeached himself, Yoon assisted in the prosecution of Park. Roh Moo-hyun was impeached in 2004 on accusations of illegal electioneering, incompetence, and economic mismanagement. However, the Constitutional Court cleared him of two infractions and deemed the remaining charge not serious enough to warrant removal, allowing him to remain in office.

=== Impeachment procedure ===
The procedure for impeachment is set out in the 10th Constitution of South Korea in 1987. Article 65, Clause 1, specifies that the National Assembly may impeach the president, prime minister, or other state officials if they violate the constitution or other laws while performing official duties.

For an impeachment motion against a sitting president to pass, a majority of the National Assembly must propose it, and a two-thirds supermajority – 200 out of 300 members – must vote in favor. Once passed, the individual is immediately suspended from their duties pending a ruling by the Constitutional Court of Korea. The scope of impeachment is limited to removal from public office, with no further penalties imposed through this process.

According to the Constitutional Court Act passed in 1988, the Constitutional Court must render a decision within 180 days after it receives any case for adjudication, including impeachment cases. If the respondent has already left office before the decision, the case is dismissed. Formal removal of the president requires six of the nine justices voting in favor. Due to one vacancy, President Yoon Suk Yeol's removal needed six out of eight judges to vote to remove him from office. Article 23 of the Constitutional Court Act requires at least seven justices for deliberation.

If the National Assembly impeaches the president, the president is immediately suspended from office, with the prime minister assuming the role of acting president. In the event of the president's resignation or removal by the Constitutional Court, an early presidential election is required to be held within 60 days. During this interim period, the prime minister continues to serve as acting president until the election of a new president.

=== Previous calls to impeach Yoon ===
In July 2024, an online petition started on the National Assembly's website calling for Yoon's impeachment gathered over a million signatures, with all petitions with over 50,000 signatures required under law to be reviewed by a parliamentary committee. The website crashed, with over 22,000 people concurrently waiting to access the website with an estimated wait time of 30 minutes. In November 2024, over 3,000 professors and researchers at various universities signed a letter asking Yoon to resign. One interviewer speculated that the letter had received the highest number of signatures from academics since protests during the Park Geun-hye administration. On 28 November, 1,466 South Korean Catholic priests also called for Yoon to be impeached, issuing a statement titled "How could a person be like this" (어째서 사람이 이 모양인가), which claimed that he is a puppet of private interests who has no idea what he does or who he is and who had handed over the authority entrusted to him by the people to his wife.

=== Martial law declaration ===
On 3 December, Yoon declared martial law in South Korea, stating that martial law was necessary to defend the country from anti-state forces. Military and police forces attempted to prevent legislators from entering the National Assembly Proceeding Hall, causing clashes between the security forces, protesters, and legislative aides. All 190 legislators who were present in the chamber unanimously voted to demand the lifting of martial law, forcing Yoon to lift martial law around 04:00 KST on 4 December.

== Impeachment ==
First motion to impeach Yoon
Choice	Votes
Yes	Not counted 195 (65%)
No	Not counted 195 (65%)
Abstentions	Not counted 195 (65%)
Invalid	Not counted 195 (65%)
Not voting	105 (35%)
Impeachment unsuccessful

On 4 December, 190 (Note: Although The Korea Times says "The motion was [by] the DPK, Rebuilding Korea Party (RKP), New Reform Party, Progressive Party, Basic Income Party and Social Democratic Party. All 191 lawmakers from the [parties...]", Financial Times says "190 lawmakers from six opposition parties", and the actual parties add to 190 members.) legislators across six opposition parties submitted a motion for impeachment, intending to discuss the bill the following day; the DPK later planned a vote on 7 December. At a meeting with Prime Minister Han Duck-soo and PPP party leader Han Dong-hoon, Yoon said that he would not resign, there was "no wrongdoing" in his declaration, it was a "warning" to the opposition, and it was to prevent the DPK's "reckless impeachment actions". Yoon also defended plans to arrest Han Dong-hoon for going to the National Assembly. On 5 December, the PPP announced they would oppose impeachment, following an emergency meeting the previous evening. However, at an emergency meeting on 6 December, Han Dong-hoon said it was necessary to "promptly suspend [Yoon] from his duties to protect the Republic of Korea", citing Yoon's orders to arrest and detain key politicians during martial law, including Han himself. That same day, Cho Kyoung-tae voiced his support for Yoon's impeachment, becoming the first MP from the PPP to do so.

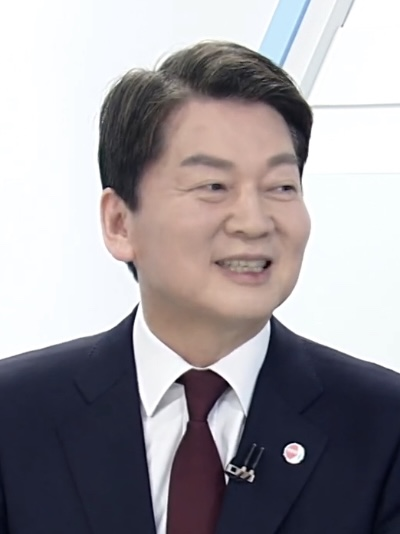
Ahn Cheol-soo was the only PPP lawmaker to not leave the chamber before voting.

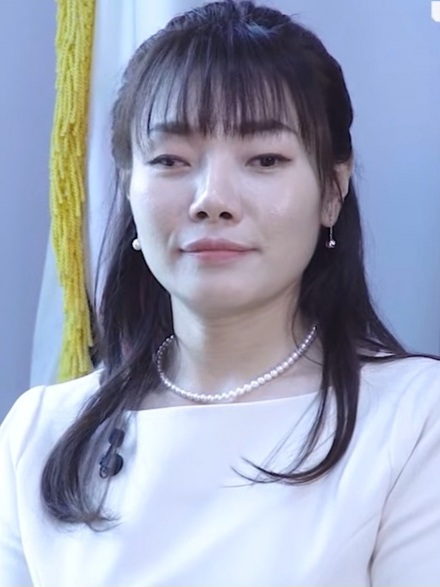
Kim Ye-ji was one of two PPP lawmakers who left the chamber but later returned.

During an investigation by the National Assembly on 5 December, Army Chief Park An-su said he had been handed the text of the martial law notice only on the night of its declaration and was unaware of soldiers being deployed to the Assembly. Deputy Defense Minister Kim Seon-ho said he had only learned about the declaration on the news and that Kim Yong-hyun ordered soldiers to enter the Assembly and prevent lawmakers from gathering. He also apologized for failing to prevent the troop deployment, saying that he opposed it. Separately, the National Police Agency announced that Yoon was under investigation for insurrection following a complaint from the opposition. Park submitted his resignation to Yoon, which he rejected.

On 6 December, Special Forces Commander Kwak Jong-guen said he had ordered soldiers present at the Assembly on 3 December not to enter the session hall and ruled out the provision of live ammunition and harm against civilians. He also said that he would not follow such orders in the event of martial law being declared again. Later that day, the Defense Ministry suspended Kwak, Yeo In-hyung and Capital Defense Command Commander Lee Jin-woo for their involvement in martial law. They, along with Park An-su, were also subjected to a ban on overseas travel. Hong Jang-won, the deputy director of the NIS, also said that he was ordered by Yoon to arrest politicians during martial law during a series of phone calls. This was denied by Director Cho Tae-yong, who said the NIS has no such powers. The National Archives of Korea issued notices to the Presidential Office, the Defense Ministry and other relevant agencies, to preserve documents, video footage and other records relating to the declaration of martial law amid concerns over their discarding. The Presidential Office said it did not possess the detailed minutes of the cabinet meeting that preceded the declaration.

On 7 December, Yoon apologized for declaring martial law, describing it as a product of desperation as the head of state and pledging that there would not be a second martial law declaration. He also pledged to entrust measures related to his term in office to the PPP. Lee Jae Myung called the apology "disappointing" and insisted on Yoon's resignation or impeachment. He also criticized Yoon's power-sharing arrangement with the PPP as "destroying the constitutional order", while DPK Floor Leader Park Chan-dae called the arrangement a "second coup". Later that day, the impeachment vote failed after 195 lawmakers of the 200 needed to impeach attended, following a boycott by all but three MPs from the PPP. The decision led to massive public anger against the PPP, with a petition filed at the National Assembly website calling for the PPP's dissolution obtaining more than 171,000 supporters, exceeding the 50,000 needed to have the proposal submitted to the standing committee.

Following the vote, Han Dong-hoon said that the PPP would continue to "push for the president's orderly retreat to minimize chaos", and said Yoon would be "effectively stripped of his duties until he retreats" while Prime Minister Han Duck-soo managed state affairs "in consultation with the party"; a party special task force proposed that Yoon leave office in February or March 2025 and elections to replace him held in April or May. The DPK said that it would continue to file impeachment motions against Yoon on a weekly basis in response. That same day, the DPK filed an impeachment motion against Interior Minister Lee Sang-min for mishandling the martial law situation. Facing mounting pressure, Lee resigned on 8 December.

On 8 December, Han Dong-hoon said that the PPP had "effectively obtained [Yoon's] promise to step down" in exchange for the party blocking his impeachment, and said Yoon would "not interfere in state affairs, including foreign affairs", even before his "orderly early resignation". On 12 December, Yoon issued a statement vowing to "fight to the end", resisting the push for his resignation and claiming the martial law declaration was a legitimate "act of governance" against "forces and criminal groups that have been responsible for paralysing the country's government". Yoon accused the opposition of disrupting the constitution instead through obstructionism: "The opposition parties are currently dancing a frenzied sword dance, saying that the declaration of emergency martial law was a crime of insurrection, but is that really so? Who are the forces currently paralyzing the government and disrupting the constitution of Korea?", while further claiming that the opposition majority National Assembly had taken North Korea's side in disputes, and that it was "a monster that destroys the constitutional order of liberal democracy".

Second motion to impeach Yoon
Choice	Votes
Yes	204 (68%)
No	85 (28.3%)
Abstentions	3 (1%)
Invalid	8 (2.7%)
Not voting	0
Impeachment successful

Following Yoon's statement, Han Dong-hoon called for Yoon's impeachment and convened an ethics committee to discuss Yoon's expulsion from the PPP. Later that day, the DPK filed its second motion to impeach Yoon, and the National Assembly passed impeachment motions against Justice Minister Park Sung-jae and KNP Commissioner Cho Ji-ho. By the end of the same day, seven PPP lawmakers and four PPP metropolitan and provincial executives (Seoul Mayor Oh Se-hoon, South Chungcheong Province Governor Kim Tae-heum, North Chungcheong Province Governor Kim Young-hwan, and Incheon Mayor Yoo Jeong-bok) declared their support for Yoon's impeachment.

On 14 December, the National Assembly voted to impeach Yoon, with 204 lawmakers, including 12 from the PPP, supporting impeachment. Yoon's presidential powers were suspended immediately upon the delivery of the impeachment resolution to the Presidential Office. Prime Minister Han Duck-soo stepped in as acting president, and the impeachment motion proceeded to the Constitutional Court. On 27 December, 192 MPs in the National Assembly voted to impeach Han Duck-soo for blocking investigations against Yoon and his wife, colluding with Yoon on martial law and blocking the appointment of justices to fill vacancies in the Constitutional Court. Despite being boycotted by the PPP, Han's impeachment was made possible with a simple majority because Han was Prime Minister rather than the elected president. This made Deputy Prime Minister and Finance Minister Choi Sang-mok the new acting president. On 21 March 2025, the DPK and four other opposition parties submitted a motion in the National Assembly to impeach Choi, citing charges that included abetting Yoon's martial law declaration. On 24 March 2025, the Constitutional Court overturned Han's impeachment, reinstating him as acting president. On 1 May, Choi resigned minutes before the National Assembly was set to vote on his impeachment, prompting the suspension of the proceedings.

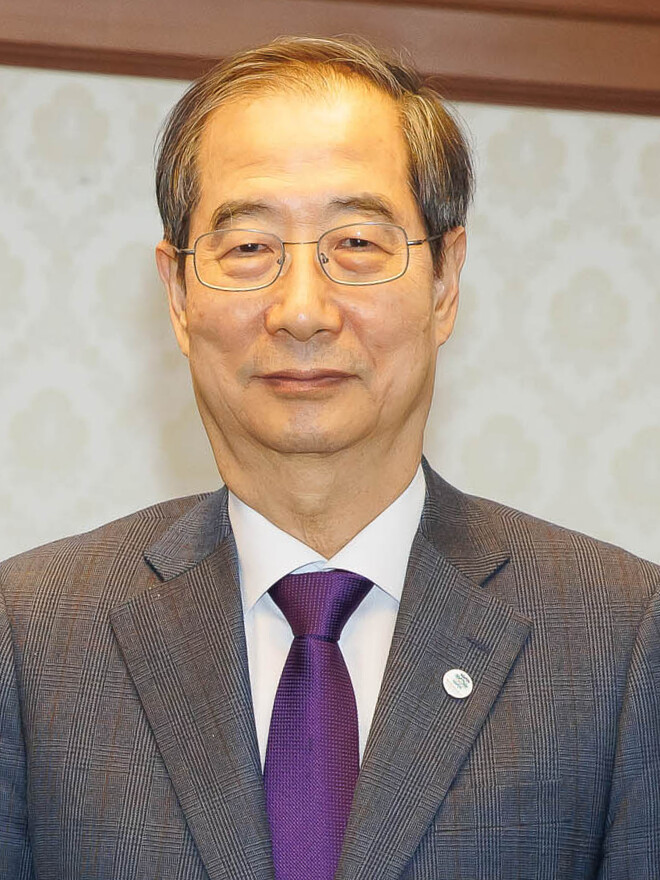
Prime Minister Han Duck-soo became acting president after Yoon's impeachment; he would be impeached himself soon thereafter.

Following the passage of the second impeachment motion, Yoon addressed the nation, acknowledging his suspension while pledging to "do my best for the nation until the end". Five members of the PPP's Supreme Council resigned to take responsibility for its approval, prompting the formation of an emergency response committee system to lead the party in accordance with its regulations. On 16 December, PPP leader Han Dong-hoon also resigned, acknowledging that Yoon's impeachment was "painful" while stating that he did not regret supporting it. The DPK said that the motion's success was "a historic victory for democracy" and pledged to continue investigating Yoon for declaring martial law.

With Yoon's suspension as president, his prime minister, Han Duck-soo became acting president. Amid Han being asked by police for questioning in its investigation of martial law, DPK leader Lee Jae Myung said that the party would not move to impeach Han for the time being to avoid "confusion in state affairs". Lee also called for the formation of a consultative body between the National Assembly and the government to stabilize state affairs. On 20 December, both the PPP and the DPK agreed to a proposal by Speaker Woo Won-shik creating a joint consultative body to discuss issues regarding national security and the economy.

=== Related motions ===
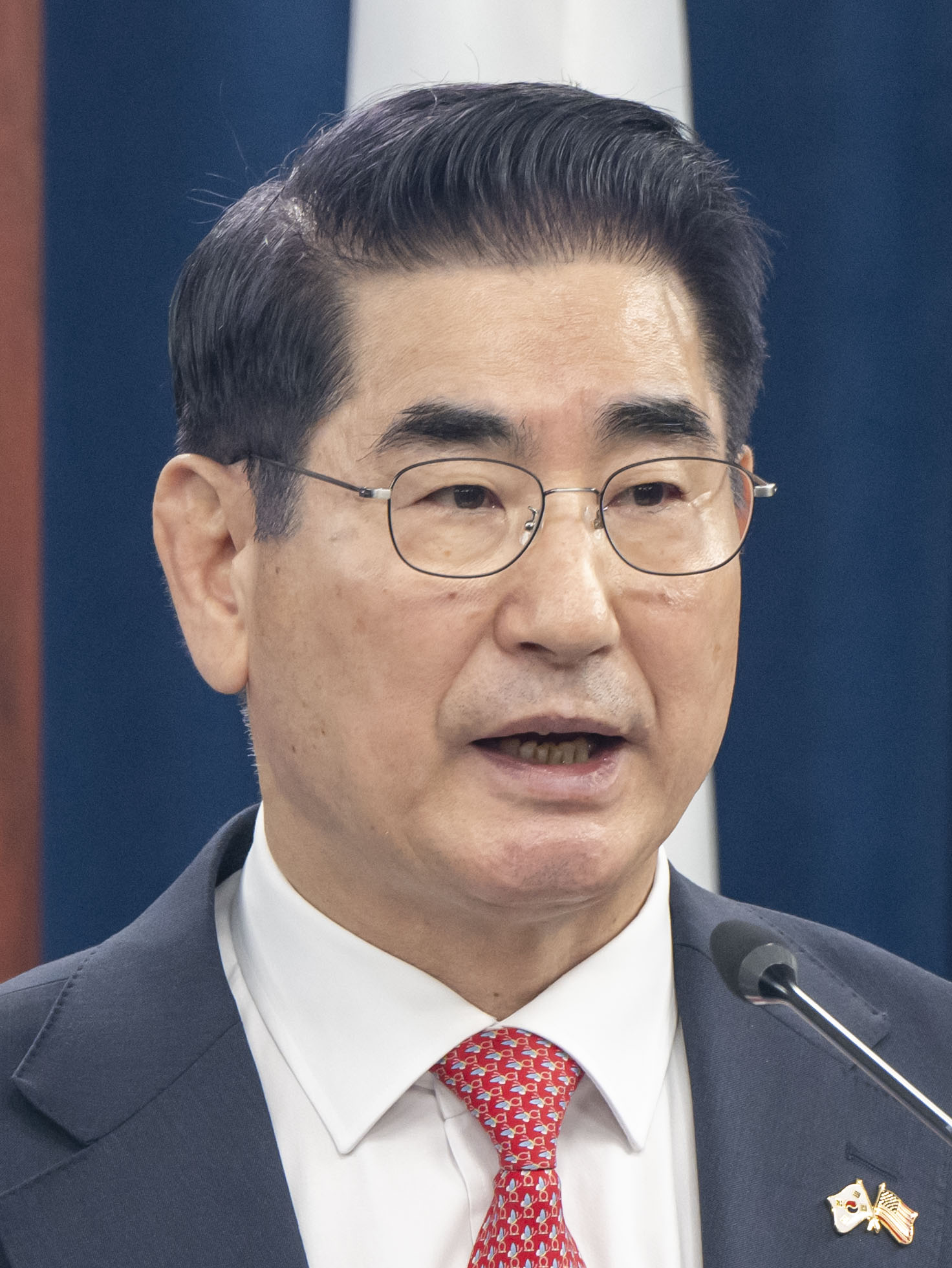
Defense Minister Kim Yong-hyun

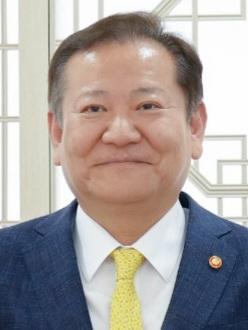
Interior Minister Lee Sang-min

Aside from Yoon, several officials were either impeached or threatened with impeachment over their involvement in the declaration of martial law. These include Defense Minister Kim Yong-hyun, who resigned on 5 December, and Interior Minister Lee Sang-min, whose impeachment motion was filed by the DPK on 7 December. Lee resigned the next day on 8 December. On 12 December, the National Assembly passed impeachment motions against Justice Minister Park Sung-jae and National Police Agency Commissioner Cho Ji-ho. On 10 April 2025, Park Sung-jae's impeachment was overturned by the Constitutional Court.

After Yoon's impeachment, the DPK announced that it would be taking legal action against Yoon's chief legal adviser Seok Dong-hyun after he denied at a press conference on 19 December that Yoon intended to have politicians arrested during martial law and downplayed the incursion of soldiers into the National Assembly.

On 24 December, the DPK said that it would seek to impeach acting president Han Duck-soo for vetoing two special counsel bills that sought to investigate President Yoon and his wife Kim Keon Hee over his martial law declaration and charges of corruption. The DPK also cited Han blocking the appointment of three nominees to fill vacancies in the Constitutional Court that would hear Yoon's impeachment. The motion was filed on 26 December, with the plenary vote scheduled on 27 December. Prior to the vote on 27 December, Speaker Woo Won-shik determined that a simple majority would suffice to impeach Han, as opposed to a two-thirds majority to impeach a president. The impeachment motion passed, with 192 MPs voting in favor and Han accepting the outcome. However, the Constitutional Court later rejected Han's impeachment in a 7–1 ruling on 24 March 2025.

On 21 March 2025, the DPK and four other opposition parties submitted a motion in the National Assembly to impeach then-acting president Choi Sang-mok, citing his refusal to appoint justices to the Constitutional Court. The petitioners also charged Choi with abetting Yoon's martial law declaration in December 2024, failing to appoint a National Assembly-backed independent prosecutor to look into possible insurrection by Yoon despite the legislature passing a resolution to do so, and failing to act on the application of a nominee to the Supreme Court of Korea. The motion reached the National Assembly plenary on 2 April, by which time Choi had reverted to his previous position as finance minister following Han Duck-soo's reinstatement as acting president and prime minister by the Constitutional Court on 24 March. However, Choi resigned minutes before the chamber was set to vote on the motion on 1 May, prompting the suspension of the proceedings.

=== Preparations ===
The Constitutional Court of Korea has 180 days from the passage of an impeachment motion to review it. At the time of filing the impeachment motion, the court was composed of only six justices; two vacancies were subsequently filled by Choi Sang-mok after nomination by the National Assembly, leaving one vacancy. It normally has nine members and is required by law to have at least seven to begin hearings. In addition, two of the six justices have tenures ending within the mandated review period in April 2025, causing additional concerns over quorum. Debates have arisen in the National Assembly on whether acting president Han Duck-soo is entitled to fill the vacant seats, with the DPK supporting it on the grounds that the president only serves to confirm parliamentary nominees and the PPP opposing it on the grounds that an acting president can only appoint justices only in the event of a presidential vacancy, not a suspension of duties. Yoon's impeachment became the eighth impeachment case in 2024 alone received by the court – the highest number in a single year in South Korean history.

The impeachment motion was submitted to the court on 14 December 2024, and proceedings began on 16 December, with the court calling the case a "top priority". On 16 December 2024, the court announced that trial would proceed with the original six justices then on the bench. The identity of the presiding justice, typically undisclosed, was revealed to be Justice Jeong Hyeong-sik, a Yoon appointee, due to the gravity of the case. Former Korea Communications Commission chair Kim Hong-il was announced as the head of Yoon's legal defense team, while National Assembly Legislation and Judiciary Committee Chair Jung Chung-rae served as the impeachment prosecutor. On 26 December, the National Assembly approved a motion to fill the three vacancies in the Constitutional Court, with the PPP not participating in the confirmation vote. However, Acting President Han Duck-soo refused to appoint the nominees, citing the need for a bipartisan consensus. In response, the DPK filed an impeachment motion against Han that same day, which passed in the plenary vote on 27 December, resulting in Han's duty as acting president being suspended until his acquittal by the Constitutional Court on 24 March 2025. On 31 December, acting president Choi Sang-mok appointed Chung Kyesun and Cho Hanchang to the Constitutional Court as part of efforts to fill up the vacancies. However, he withheld the appointment of a third nominee, Ma Eun-hyuk, which the Constitutional Court ruled was unconstitutional on 27 February 2025.

The first preparatory hearing for the case was held 27 December 2024, with the next hearing occurring on 3 January 2025. The National Assembly was represented in the trial by DPK lawmaker Jung Chung-rae, who is the chair of the assembly's legislation and judiciary committee. Yoon's defense team comprised Bae Bo-yoon, a former Constitutional Court scholar and spokesperson during the impeachment trial of former president Park Geun-hye; Yun Gap-geun, former head of the Daegu High Prosecutors' Office; Bae Jin-han, a former judge and Yoon's classmate at Seoul National University School of Law; and Kim Hong-il, former head of the Korea Communications Commission.

=== Withdrawal of insurrection charge ===
On 3 January, the National Assembly petitioners removed insurrection charges from the grounds for impeachment to focus on constitutional violations related to the martial law declaration rather than pursuing criminal charges, in order to expedite the case. Park Chan-un, a law professor at Hanyang University, called this a logical move, as the impeachment trial is "fundamentally a 'disciplinary trial' focused on whether Yoon violated the constitution". The PPP criticized the move, claiming "the move exposed legal flaws in the impeachment motion and thus the motion should be nullified". However, the DPK defended the revision, asserting that since the impeachment trial is not a criminal proceeding, it should focus on violations of the constitution and that "the revision was necessary to expedite court proceedings". In its final verdict on Yoon's impeachment on 4 April, the Court recognized the withdrawal of the insurrection charges as valid.

=== Proceedings ===
==== January ====
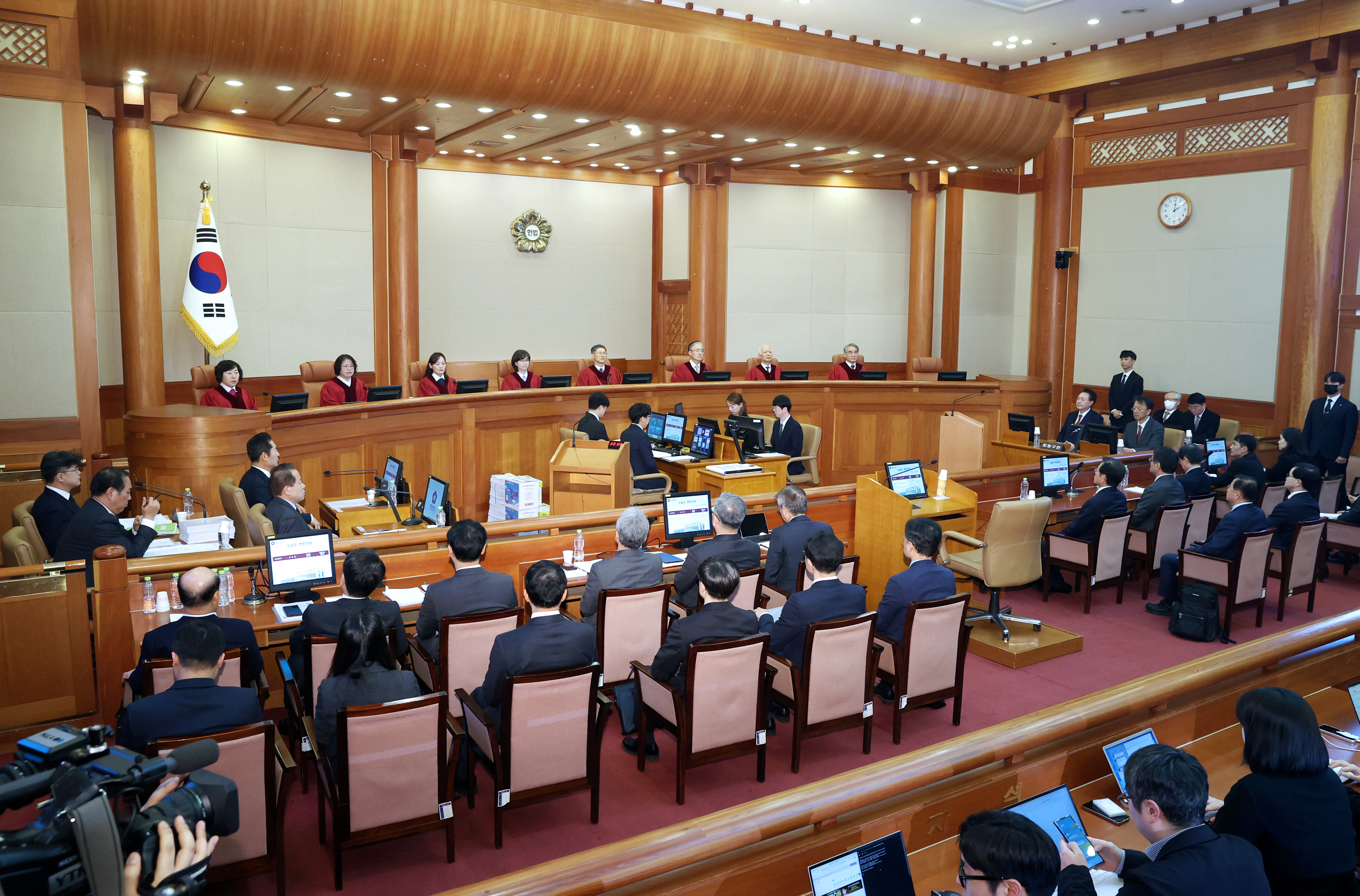
Yoon at the third hearing of impeachment trial at the Constitutional Court on 21 January 2025

During the 3 January hearing, Yoon's defense team defended the declaration of martial law as a "national emergency situation" and said that its brief duration "did not restrict the people's basic rights". It also said Yoon had immunity from prosecution, citing the Supreme Court of the United States's 2024 ruling in Trump v. United States. They also alleged media bias against Yoon but were reprimanded by Justice Cheong Hyung-sik. Meanwhile, the prosecution accused defense lawyers of distorting the nature of the trial and insulting the justices.

Oral arguments for the trial began on 14 January, with another session on 16 January in the event that Yoon fails to appear. A total of five sessions would be held until 4 February, including on 21 and 23 January. On 12 January, Yoon's lawyer said that his client would not attend the 14 January hearing, citing safety concerns and the possibility of him being apprehended by investigators seeking to execute an arrest warrant against him on his way to court. On 13 January, Yoon's lawyers requested the exclusion of Justice Chung Kyesun from hearing the case, accusing her of progressive leanings and showing her "prediction" for the trials during her confirmation by the National Assembly in December 2024. It also called for the first day of the trial to be moved from 14 January, saying that the impeachment of acting president Han Duck-soo needed to be heard first.

The 14 January hearing lasted four minutes before being adjourned due to Yoon's absence. During the session, the court also dismissed the defense's request to exclude Justice Chung Kyesun from hearing the case. It also rejected Yoon's objection to the designated dates for hearings, saying the scheduling followed laws and regulations governing the Constitutional Court, not a criminal court. The impeachment team called as its witnesses Hong Jang-won, the first deputy director of the National Intelligence Service; Cho Ji-ho, commissioner of the National Police Agency; Kwak Jong-geun, commander of the Republic of Korea Army Special Warfare Command; Lee Jin-woo, commander of the Capital Defense Command; and Yeo In-hyung, chief of the Defense Counterintelligence Command.

At the 16 January hearing, the court added additional hearing dates scheduled for 6, 11, and 13 February. It also called for additional witnesses, including former defense minister Kim Yong-hyun and police commissioner Cho Ji-ho, to testify. The court decided to admit surveillance footage from the National Assembly, the National Election Commission (NEC), and the official residence of the National Assembly speaker as evidence and announced plans to fact-check Yoon's claims of electoral fraud. During the hearing, Yoon's defense team formally presented its position on the issues, while the plaintiff outlined its arguments for impeachment. Yoon did not attend the hearing in person. His request to reschedule the hearing due to his arrest the previous day was rejected by the court.

In the 21 January hearing, Yoon made his first physical appearance for his impeachment. He denied allegations that he had ordered the military to forcibly remove lawmakers from the National Assembly. Yoon stated that the soldiers deployed to the legislature were not intended to suspend the National Assembly or obstruct its efforts to lift martial law, acknowledging that such actions would have caused a crisis.

On 22 January, acting president Choi Sang-mok ordered a 24-hour police presence at the Constitutional Court and other courts nationwide following the 2025 Seoul Western District Court riot and other incidents of political tension related to Yoon's impeachment.

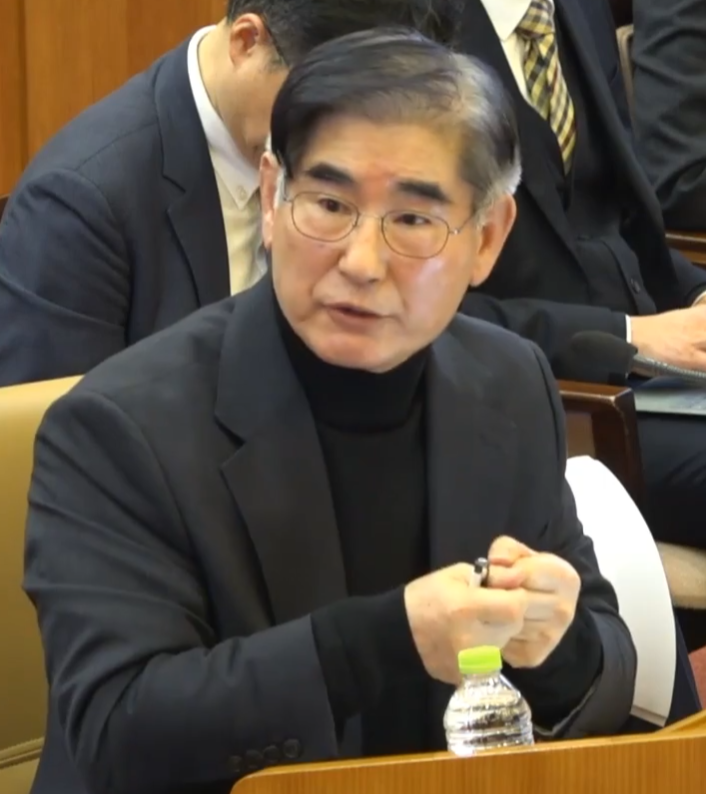
Kim Yong-hyun testifying as a witness at the trial; 23 January 2025

On 23 January, Yoon appeared at the impeachment trial again, with Kim Yong-hyun present as a witness. Kim denied allegations that Yoon had ordered the military to storm the National Assembly to prevent lawmakers from convening and passing a resolution nullifying martial law. However, he admitted to recommending declaring martial law to Yoon and to writing a note to Finance Minister Choi Sang-mok, instructing the establishment of an emergency legislative body during martial law. Alongside Yoon, Kim was also accused of ordering lawmakers to be dragged out of the parliament, to which Kim responded with; "The situation was very chaotic, I thought someone might get crushed to death. So I said to pull them out for now to reduce the risk of serious harm. That’s what I meant." Yoon defended his declaration of martial law, asserting that it did not fail but acknowledging that it ended "sooner than expected".

==== February ====
On 1 February, Yoon's legal team formally requested the recusal of acting chief justice Moon Hyung-bae, Justice Lee Mi-seon, and Justice Chung Kyesun from the impeachment case, citing concerns about impartiality. The team alluded to Moon's past social media interactions with DPK leader Lee Jae Myung, Justice Lee's brother, who serves as a vice chairman of a committee at the Lawyers for a Democratic Society and had supported Yoon's resignation, as well as Justice Chung's husband, who had signed a public declaration supporting Yoon's impeachment.

Appearing again for the 4 February hearing, Yoon admitted to ordering soldiers to the NEC to check its systems operations, citing allegations of election fraud. He again denied accusations of him ordering the military to forcibly remove lawmakers from the National Assembly, saying that it could not have been done due to the presence of thousands of civilians outside the assembly compound. Lee Jin-woo testified that he had not received orders from Yoon or Kim Yong-hyun to obstruct the lifting of martial law by lawmakers but said he believed that the military deployment to the legislature was legitimate under the Martial Law Act. Yeo In-hyung also attended the hearing as a witness but refused to testify, citing the risk of self-incrimination in a parallel criminal investigation against him.

On 8 February, police launched an investigation after reports of a planned mob attack, scheduled for 13 February, on the Constitutional Court trial emerged online. In response, more than 2,700 police personnel and 140 buses were deployed near the court on 11 February. Barricades and panels were set up to restrict access, and the court justices received armed protection.

At the 11 February hearing, Yoon blamed opposition parties for his decision to declare martial law. Yoon claimed that the opposition parties had failed to give him due respect as president and described them as "malicious". Yoon cited his addresses to the National Assembly, during which he said opposition lawmakers refused to attend or shake hands and turned away from him. Former interior minister Lee Sang-min also testified before the court and denied that Yoon had ordered him to cut off electricity and water supplies to left-leaning media outlets critical of Yoon, specifically the Hankyoreh, the Kyunghyang Shinmun, MBC and JTBC, as well as the opinion polling agency Flower Research during martial law.

At 13 February hearing, which Yoon attended, former NIS first deputy director Hong Jang-won, who previously testified to compiling a list of politicians as instructed by Yoon to "clean them all up" during martial law, revealed that he had been contacted through text messages by first lady Kim Keon Hee on the night of martial law, but could not recall the exact details. His statement was disputed by NIS director Cho Tae-yong, who cited multiple discrepancies and accused Hong of links with opposition politicians. Col. Cho Seong-hyun, commander of the 1st Security Group at the Capital Defense Command and the only witness directly requested by the court, also testified that his commanding officer Lee Jin-woo ordered him to support special forces soldiers at the National Assembly as they dragged lawmakers out of the building. The Constitutional Court also set an additional impeachment hearing to be held on 18 February. On 14 February, it also set an additional hearing scheduled on 20 February and ordered Han Duck-soo to testify as a witness.

Yoon arrived at the Constitutional Court for the 18 February hearing but left shortly before it began after it was determined following a meeting with his lawyers that his attendance was unnecessary. The hearing proceeded with the prosecution and defense summarizing their arguments. The court also rejected an appeal by Yoon's lawyers to postpone the 20 February hearing due to a scheduling conflict with the first preliminary hearing of Yoon's separate criminal trial on insurrection charges. However, the court agreed to push back the opening of the hearing by an hour. The court also issued a subpoena for Cho Ji-ho, who refused to testify as a witness for the third time, citing health issues.

Yoon arrived at the Constitutional Court for the 20 February hearing but left shortly after his lawyers determined that it would be inappropriate for him to watch Han Duck-soo testify, reentering once Han had finished. Han said that members of Yoon's cabinet were concerned about his plans to declare martial law and tried to dissuade him from doing so, while denying claims from Kim Yong-hyun that some members were in support of the plan. He also said that the martial law declaration did not follow constitutional and legal procedures and questioned whether Yoon's cabinet meeting on 3 December was a proper one. Cho Ji-ho, who finally appeared at the trial, refused to answer most questions presented at him, citing a related criminal trial. Later, the court set the final impeachment hearing on 25 February.

At the 25 February hearing, Yoon said he was "sorry and thankful to the people". He also pledged to push for political reforms and a constitutional revision to change the current presidential system if his impeachment is overturned, adding that the fulfillment of such pledges might lead to him leaving office before the end of his term. At the same time, he continued to deny the accusations of insurrection against him and accusations that of him interfering with the National Assembly's affairs. He also continued to defend martial law, saying that it was intended to appeal to the public about the "imperial opposition party" and accused the latter of exploiting experiences from previous martial law declarations to "incite public fear". Lee Kwang-beom, one of the prosecution lawyers, compared Yoon to previous South Korean presidents including Park Chung Hee and Chun Doo-hwan, adding that Yoon's declaration of martial law was "dictatorship". The trial ended with a total of 11 hearings held over 73 days and 16 people testifying as witnesses.

==== March ====
On 12 March, the government imposed a no-fly zone within a radius of 1 nautical mile from the Constitutional Court that would last until 19 March. The National Police Agency also said it would declare its highest-level security protocol on the day the court issues its verdict on Yoon's impeachment. On 16 March, PPP floor leader Kweon Seong-dong said the party would respect the Constitutional Court's verdict on Yoon's impeachment regardless of its outcome.

==== April ====
On 1 April, the Constitutional Court announced that it would issue its verdict regarding Yoon's impeachment at 11:00 KST on 4 April. In response, multiple venues and events scheduled in Seoul on the said date were closed, cancelled or postponed. Police also imposed a "vacuum zone" and sealed off the area within a 150-meter radius around the Constitutional Court with police buses. About 96,370 people applied for 20 available spectator seats to attend the verdict at the court, making it the highest number of applicants to try and attend an impeachment proceeding in South Korea. Yoon declined to attend the reading of the court's verdict.

On the day before the verdict (3 April), 14,000 police officers were deployed, with Level 2 emergency response status being issued. City buses were diverted, and additional police were sent to major political sites. On the day of the ruling, the emergency status was raised to level 1, allowing for 100% of the police to be deployed.

=== Verdict ===
Official summary of Constitutional Court ruling in English The full text of Case on Impeachment Trial of President (Yoon Suk-yeol) (Summary) at Wikisource

On 4 April, the Constitutional Court upheld the impeachment in a unanimous 8–0 decision, which formally removed Yoon from office, effective at 11:22 KST. In the decision read out by acting Chief Justice of the Constitutional Court Moon Hyung-bae, the court declared that Yoon did not follow procedures for declaring martial law. He further stated that Yoon "went against those he was supposed to protect" and "damaged people's political rights." The court also acknowledged "the resistance of citizens" in helping prevent the full implementation of martial law, and said that Yoon's conflict with the National Assembly was "a political issue that must be resolved within the bounds of democracy", adding that the legislature's use of its powers "did not, in itself, create a severe crisis situation at the time justifying the declaration of martial law" while saying that the chamber should have respected minority opinions and made efforts towards compromise. It also ruled that verbal statements made by key suspects to prosecutors regarding plans of arrests by Yoon were admissible.

The verdict came 111 days after his impeachment by the National Assembly, the longest of any South Korean presidential impeachment verdict. Yoon's removal from office makes him the shortest-serving president under the democratic history of South Korea.

The court issued a 114-page decision citing serious violations of the constitution and a breach of public trust. The ruling outlined five major constitutional violations committed during the imposition of martial law on 3–4 December:

1. Failure to meet substantive requirements for declaring martial law: The court found that political gridlock and allegations of election fraud did not constitute grounds for martial law. Such issues, it stated, should be addressed through political, institutional, and judicial means. Yoon's justification of the declaration as a "warning" or "appeal to the public" was not recognized as legitimate under the Martial Law Act.
2. Failure to meet procedural requirements: Yoon did not inform the martial law commander or other officials of the details of the declaration, did not hold cabinet deliberations, and failed to obtain required signatures from the prime minister and relevant ministers. He also did not publicly announce the scope, timing, or command structure of martial law, nor did he notify the National Assembly without delay.
3. Interference with the authority of the National Assembly: Yoon deployed military and police forces to prevent lawmakers from entering the National Assembly, obstructing their rights to deliberate, vote, and exercise immunity from arrest.
4. Violation of judicial independence: The court found that Yoon was involved in tracking and planning the arrest of former and current members of the judiciary, including former chief justice Kim Myeong-su and other retired justices, thereby exerting pressure on the judiciary.
5. Infringement of political freedoms and constitutional order: The court ruled that Yoon ordered the tracking of political opponents through the National Intelligence Service (NIS), used military forces to obstruct political institutions, and issued martial law decrees that violated constitutional protections, including the rights to political activity, assembly, occupation, and the separation of powers.

Additional violations cited included unauthorized searches and seizures at the National Election Commission (NEC), and orders to inspect NEC computer systems, confiscate staff devices, and conduct surveillance without a warrant. These actions, the court stated, infringed upon the NEC's independence.

As a result of the ruling, Yoon lost presidential immunity and became subject to criminal prosecution. His trial on charges of insurrection began on 14 April. If found guilty, Yoon faces the death penalty or life imprisonment, although there has been a moratorium on executions in South Korea since 1997.

== Popular reactions ==
While the session for the first impeachment motion was underway, the crowd outside the National Assembly demanding Yoon's removal and insisting that PPP lawmakers participate in the impeachment vote was estimated to be in the hundreds of thousands, with some attempting to scale the walls and police barricades. On 5 December, phone numbers of PPP lawmakers were released online, leading to a wave of text messages from the public urging them to support Yoon's impeachment, which continued after the impeachment motion failed. One MP, Shin Sung-bum, said that he had received 10,501 messages by 9 December. After the motion failed, several PPP lawmakers' offices were vandalized, while others received funeral wreaths with messages such as "insurrection accomplices" written. A box cutter was also found at the residence of lawmaker Kim Jae-sub. A petition filed at the National Assembly website calling for the PPP's dissolution garnered more than 171,000 signatures, exceeding the 50,000 needed to have the proposal submitted to the relevant standing committee.

During the session for the second impeachment motion, at least 208,000 people gathered near the National Assembly in support of impeachment. Demonstrations in support of Yoon's impeachment were also held in cities nationwide, with 10,000 attending rallies in Jeonju and 30,000 others participating in Daegu. At the same time, a mass rally of around 40,000 people in support of Yoon was held at Gwanghwamun Square in Seoul. Trains running on Line 9 of the Seoul Metropolitan Subway avoided stopping at the National Assembly station to prevent congestion-related accidents. On 13 December, some 50 Korean Americans demonstrated outside the White House in Washington, D.C. calling for Yoon's impeachment.

Yoon's supporters rallied around slogans such as Make America Great Again and Stop the Steal inspired by U.S. President Trump. However, this is rooted in a conspiracy theory about the defeat of the PPP in the April 2024 general election. Yoon’s claim has not been proven by the National Election Commission (NEC) or the judiciary. South Korea votes on paper, and the printed ballots are kept. Hans Schattle, a professor of political science at Yonsei University, said that Yoon’s supporters’ comparisons with Donald Trump are inappropriate.

In support of Yoon's impeachment, leading religious groups in South Korea marched with their heads, arms, and legs on the ground.

After Yoon's impeachment was upheld by the Constitutional Court, celebrations broke out among impeachment supporters camped outside the court, while Yoon supporters outside the presidential office reacted negatively to the verdict. One supporter was arrested on charges of breaking the window of a police bus using a club at Anguk Station near the court in anger over the verdict. Others were heard making death threats against Constitutional Court justices.

Human Rights Watch supported the outcome, calling the declaration of martial law a "grave threat to human rights and the rule of law".

== Analysis ==
The Korea Times drew comparisons between Yoon's impeachment and that of President Park Geun-hye in 2017, suggesting Yoon survived the first impeachment attempt due to PPP fears that it would suffer a crushing defeat in any ensuing snap presidential election, similar to what happened to the Saenuri Party seven years earlier after Park was removed from the presidency. While multiple opinion polls have shown DPK and opposition leader Lee Jae Myung maintaining a strong lead in any prospective matchup, a 2025 poll by The Chosun Ilbo – a right-wing paper – showed a reversal.

== Opinion polling ==
Support for Yoon's impeachment or resignation by political ideology as of 12 December 2024
Ideology	Impeachment /immediate resignation	Orderly resignation	Total
Progressive	92%	6.9%	98.9%
"Moderate"	83%	11.6%	94.6%
Conservative	43%	33.3%	76.3%
Total	74.8%	16.2%	91%

Opinion polling carried out by Realmeter on 4 December 2024 found that 73.6% of respondents supported Yoon's impeachment while 24% opposed it. It also found that 70% believed that Yoon's actions constituted treason while 25% believed otherwise. Another Realmeter poll released on 12 December found 74.8% of respondents supported either Yoon's immediate resignation or impeachment, while 16.2% supported the PPP's proposal of Yoon's orderly resignation.

A Gallup poll released on 13 December found that Yoon's impeachment was supported by 75% of respondents and opposed by 21%. It also found that 27% of PPP supporters favored impeachment, compared to 66% opposed. Among DPK supporters, 97% supported impeachment, while 3% opposed. The same poll also found Speaker Woo Won-shik emerging as the most trusted politician in South Korea for his actions during martial law and the impeachment, with a rating of 56%.

After Yoon's suspension, a Realmeter poll on 19 December found that 52.6% of respondents did not regard the PPP as the ruling party, compared to 41.6% who regarded it as such. Conversely, 59.4% considered the DPK as the ruling party while 39.1% did not.

On 31 December, a poll released by The Korea Times and Hankook Research and conducted from 26 to 27 December found 69% of respondents supported the upholding of Yoon's impeachment while 28% stated otherwise. It also found that support for the measure was highest among those aged 40 to 49 (90%), followed by people in their 20s (82%), 30s (77%) and 50s (70%). It also found opposition to Yoon's impeachment to be high among 56% of respondents in their 70s and 45% of those in their 60s. Support for impeachment was also expressed by 93% of those identifying as liberals, 78% among centrists and 34% among conservatives. In terms of party affiliation, support for impeachment was expressed by 98% of DPK supporters and 100% of Rebuilding Korea Party supporters, while 85% of PPP supporters believed otherwise. Polling by the same entities also found that 65% of respondents believed that it was necessary for all nine seats in the Constitutional Court to be filled in order hear Yoon's impeachment trial, while 31% believed otherwise.

As the impeachment trial was underway, a poll released by Gallup on 14 February 2025 found that 57% supported Yoon's impeachment while 38% were opposed. It also found that 52% of respondents said they trusted the Constitutional Court, while 40% said they did not. A poll released by Realmeter on 24 February found that 52% supported Yoon's impeachment while 45.1% were opposed. It also found that 50.7% of respondents regarded the impeachment trial as fair, while 45% said they did not. A poll released by Gallup on 28 February showed that 59% supported Yoon's impeachment while 35% were opposed. It also found support for impeachment strongest among DPK supporters and among people aged in their 20s and 50s, and opposition strongest among PPP supporters and people aged 70 and older.

After the date of the Constitutional Court's verdict was announced, a survey held by Realmeter from 2 to 4 April and released on 7 April found that 76.9% of respondents said they would accept the court's ruling, while 17% said they did not while 15% remained undecided. It also found that support for the ruling was at 86.5% among DPK supporters and 65.5% among PPP supporters.

Following the upholding of Yoon's impeachment on 4 April, a survey by Gallup held from 4 to 5 April and released on 6 April found that 81% of respondents accepted the ruling, while 17% did not.

== Aftermath ==
With his removal from office due to the impeachment, Yoon is disqualified from running for public office in South Korea for five years as per the constitution; in any case, presidents in South Korea can only serve a single term. Additionally, with the exception of a continued security detail for five years, extendable to ten if deemed needed by the security chief and not applicable if he is detained again, Yoon loses all post-presidential benefits such as a pension (which could have been up to 95% of the presidential salary), free medical care, right to burial in a national cemetery (for example the Seoul National Cemetery), and the right to a support staff.

Yoon expressed regret at failing to live up to the public’s expectations, but said "It has been the greatest honor of my life to serve our nation". One of his lawyers, Yoon Kap-keun, called the ruling "completely incomprehensible" and a "pure political decision". At a meeting with PPP leaders, Yoon expressed hope that the party would win the next presidential election. The PPP said it accepted the ruling, while the DPK's Lee Jae Myung expressed praise for the South Korean people for "protecting our democratic republic". National Assembly Speaker Woo Won-shik said that the impeachment ruling "reaffirmed that no one in the Republic of Korea can stand above the law."

Shortly after Yoon's impeachment was upheld, the presidential flag was lowered at his office in Yongsan, Seoul. His chief of staff, Chung Jin-suk, National Security Adviser Shin Won-sik and 13 other aides submitted their resignations to acting President Han Duck-soo on 4 April. The resignations were rejected by Han, citing the necessity of maintaining regular government functions. In a separate address, Han pledged to ensure stability in national security and diplomacy, as well as a smooth transition of leadership to the next president. On 8 April, Han announced that elections to replace Yoon would be held on 3 June 2025. On 11 April, Yoon and his wife vacated the official residence and moved back to their personal accommodation in Gangnam, Seoul.

Yoon announced on 4 April that he would recognize the ruling. However, protests calling for nullification continued.

=== Constitutional amendment ===
In order to avert a similar future crisis, National Assembly speaker Woo Won-shik proposed holding a referendum on a constitutional amendment alongside the snap presidential election. Among the proposals included were reducing the presidential term from five years to four, transferring oversight of the Board of Audit and Inspection to the National Assembly, allowing MPs to nominate the prime minister, introducing a runoff voting system, and strengthening local autonomy and basic rights. However, on 7 April the DPK rejected the proposal to hold a referendum alongside the snap election, with DPK leader Lee Jae Myung saying that the proposals were highly divisive and would heighten tensions during the campaign. Lee also said that it was more urgent to resolve the crime of rebellion and prevent the destruction of democracy. Following this, Woo withdrew his proposal for a simultaneous vote.

== See also ==
- Lee Myung-bak § Conviction and sentence
  - BBK stock price manipulation incident
- Roh Moo-hyun § Bribery allegations
