= Corruption Investigation Office for High-ranking Officials =

Government agency in South Korea

- Emblem and logo

- Flag

Agency overview
- Formed: January 21, 2021; 5 years ago
- Headquarters: Gwacheon Government Complex, Gwacheon, Gyeonggi Province, South Korea
- Employees: 25 prosecutors of the Investigative Department (including the head of the department and the deputy director); 40 investigators; 20 general administrative positions
- Agency executives: Oh Dong-woon, Director; Vacant (acting Song Chang-jin), Deputy Director
- Website: cio.go.kr/eng/

Korean name
- Hangul: 고위공직자범죄수사처
- Hanja: 高位公職者犯罪搜査處
- RR: Gowi gongjikja beomjoe susacheo
- MR: Kowi kongjikcha pŏmjoe susach'ŏ

The Corruption Investigation Office for High-ranking Officials (CIO; Korean: 고위공직자범죄수사처) is an independent agency of the South Korean government responsible for prosecuting crimes and investigating allegations involving "high-ranking officials" or their direct family members.

The CIO is expected to police almost 6,500 "high-ranking officials" — incumbent and former — and their spouses and children. The Act specifies the posts as high-ranking government officials, including but not limited to parliamentarians, prosecutors, judges and even the President. However, its investigative authority is limited to cases related to certain crimes defined by the Act, leaving other sorts of allegations and crimes, such as sexual harassment, to the Supreme Prosecutors' Office for investigation and prosecution.

== History ==
The Act on the establishment and operation of the CIO was passed by the National Assembly in December 2019 and entered into force in July 2020. However, due to the then opposition party's refusal to cooperate by not nominating their own share of members of the CIO head nomination committee, it had not initiated operations by its legally mandated date of 1 July 2020.

In February 2020, the Constitutional Court of Korea agreed to hear the case filed by the opposition party against its establishment. After breaking the law to announce its ruling in less than 180 days from the day it agreed to hear the case, the Court found the CIO's establishment law constitutional in January 2021.

In December 2020, the CIO head nomination committee recommended two candidates to the President Moon - both initially recommended by the President of Bar Association. On January 21, 2021, Kim Jin-wook, a former judge and Kim & Chang lawyer, was appointed as the first head of the CIO.

On March 4, 2021, Prosecutor General Yoon Suk Yeol offered to resign over objections on the CIO's creation as some of their powers would be taken from the Supreme Prosecutor's Office.

By May, 2021, the office finished the appointment of 13 prosecutors and 18 investigators, of the possible maximum of 23 and 40 respectively.

== Organization ==
The head of CIO is appointed by the President among two candidates recommended by the nomination committee. The committee is composed of Minister of Justice, Minister of National Court Administration, President of Korean Bar Association and four members - two recommended by the ruling party and the other by the opposition. As any of the final two candidates must be agreed by all six committee members, its two members recommended by the opposition party - and the opposition party broadly - are considered to have a veto power over the selection of CIO chief. After the first nomination committee entered gridlock as two members recommended by the opposition party exercised their veto power for all candidates recommended by other five members, the ruling party successfully pushed a legislative amendment to change the condition. The amended Act now requires the nomination committee to form only 5 of the 7 total possible votes - effectively removing veto power of the opposition party - to choose the final two candidates.

The law allows for a maximum of 25 prosecutors, including the office head and deputy.

== List of directors ==
Denotes acting capacity.

No.	Image	Name		Start	End	Duration	President		Ref.
1		Kim Jin-wook	김진욱	January 21, 2021	January 20, 2024	2 years, 364 days	DPK	Moon Jae-in	
2		Oh Dong-woon	오동운	May 21, 2024	Incumbent	2 years, 167 days	PPP	Yoon Suk Yeol	

== 2024 Martial law investigation ==
As part of the criminal investigation into President Yoon Suk Yeol's declaration of martial law and his refusal to appear for questioning, the CIO requested and obtained a court-approved arrest warrant against the impeached and thus suspended President, marking the first time that a sitting president of the country faced arrest.

On 3 January 2025, the CIO moved to execute the arrest warrant, leading to a security standoff with the Presidential Security Service at the official presidential residence.

== See also ==
- Supreme Prosecutors' Office of the Republic of Korea
- Anti-Corruption and Civil Rights Commission
- Board of Audit and Inspection
