= Board of Audit and Inspection =

Supreme audit institution of South Korea

- 감사원
- Emblem of the Board of Audit and Inspection

- Flag of the Board of Audit and Inspection

Agency overview
- Formed: 20 March 1963
- Headquarters: Jongno District, Seoul
- Agency executives: Choe Jae-hae, Chair - Comptroller-General of the Republic; Ryou Byeong-ho, Secretary General of the Republic
- Parent agency: President of South Korea
- Website: www.bai.go.kr

Korean name
- Hangul: 감사원
- Hanja: 監査院
- RR: Gamsawon
- MR: Kamsawŏn

The Board of Audit and Inspection (BAI; Korean: 감사원) is a national organization headquartered in Seoul, South Korea. Its primary function is the audit and inspection of the accounts of state and administrative bodies.

== See also ==
- Anti-Corruption and Civil Rights Commission
- Corruption Investigation Office for High-ranking Officials
