= Yongsan Presidential Office =

Residence of the president of South Korea

Office of the President of Republic of Korea
- Emblem of the Office of the President

- Flag of the Office of the President

Agency overview
- Preceding agency: Blue House
- Jurisdiction: Government of South Korea
- Website: www.president.go.kr

Korean name
- Hangul: 대한민국 대통령실
- Hanja: 大韓民國 大統領室
- RR: Daehanminguk daetongnyeongsil
- MR: Taehanmin'guk taet'ongnyŏngsil

The Office of the President (대통령실), commonly referred as the Yongsan Presidential Office, formerly Ministry of National Defense Building, was the former official residence and office of the president of South Korea before the residence and office was moved back to the Blue House in December 2025. It is located at 22 Itaewon-ro, Yongsan District, Seoul.

== Background ==
The building was opened in November 2003 and previously housed the Ministry of National Defense, its area totalling 276,000 square meters. Following the inauguration of President Yoon Suk Yeol in May 2022, Cheong Wa Dae or the Blue House, the previous presidential residence, was relieved of its duties and replaced by the current building. The facility was vacated by Yoon on 11 April 2025, a week following his impeachment and dismissal from the presidency. Its last presidential occupant is Lee Jae-myung, who stayed there following his inauguration on 4 June 2025 pending a complete relocation back to the Blue House, which was completed in December 2025.

In 2024, balloons from North Korea containing rubbish landed on the compound in July and October.

== Logo history ==
Presidential emblem used from 23 October 2022 to 12 June 2025.

Presidential emblem used from 12 June 2025 to 29 Dec 2025.

=== Flag ===
Presidential flag used from 23 October 2022 to 12 June 2025.

Presidential flag used from 12 June 2025 to 29 Dec 2025.

== See also ==
- Blue House
- Korean architecture
- Politics of South Korea
  - Office of the President of the Republic of Korea
- National Assembly Proceeding Hall
