= Presidential Security Service (South Korea) =

South Korean close protection agency

- 대통령경호처
- Seal

- Logo

- Flag

Agency overview
- Formed: 1963; 63 years ago
- Superseding agency: Kyong Mu Dae Presidential Security Police (first); Blue House Presidential Police (second)
- Type: Independent
- Jurisdiction: Government of South Korea
- Headquarters: Presidential Residence, Seoul
- Employees: Classified
- Annual budget: Classified
- Agency executives: Hwang In Kwon, Chief of the PSS; Park Gwan Cheon, Deputy Chief of the PSS
- Parent agency: President of South Korea
- Website: Official website

Korean name
- Hangul: 대통령경호처
- Hanja: 大統領警護處
- RR: Daetongnyeong gyeonghocheo
- MR: Taet'ongnyŏng kyŏnghoch'ŏ

Presidential Security Service (PSS; Korean: 대통령경호처) is a South Korean close protection agency. Modeled after the United States Secret Service, the South Korean PSS is an independent agency responsible for the protection of the president of South Korea, the prime minister of South Korea and their offices, residence and respective families, as well as heads of state visiting the country. The agency also provides services to former presidents and their immediate families for 10 years after the end of their terms and transfers them to the National Police Agency. The agents go through years of rigorous training, background, physical health, mental health and educational checks before they officially become a PSS agent and get their first assignment.

The unit is currently being commanded by Yoo Yeon-sang, a vice-ministerial Head of the PSS. Its headquarters and related support units were based near the Blue House. In May 2022, its headquarters moved to now-Presidential Office Building following relocation of President's office to the defense ministry building.

== History ==
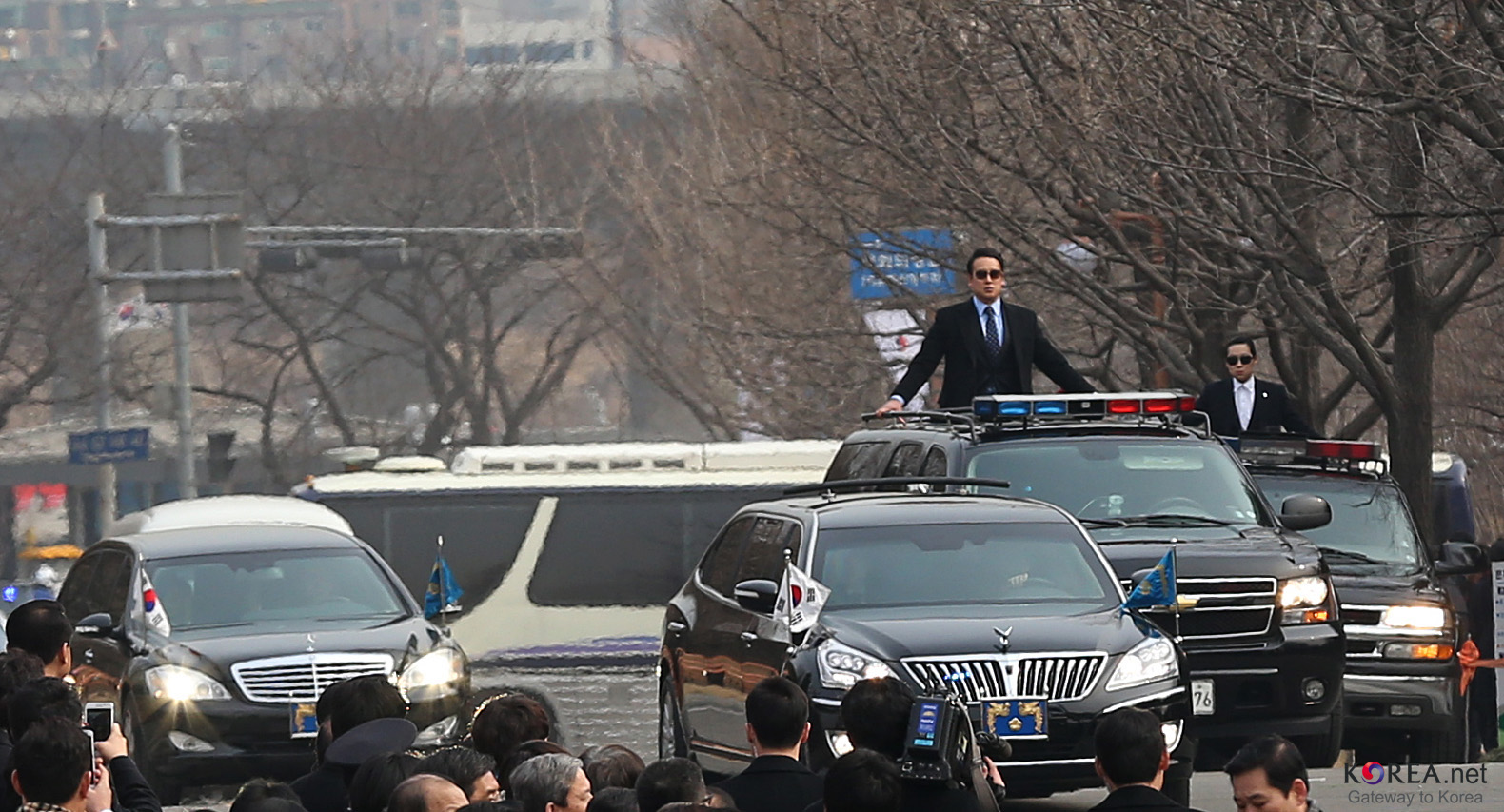
PSS Agents during Park Geun-hye's Presidential Inauguration in 2013

The PSS had been established in 1949 as the Kyong Mu Dae Presidential Security Police. Its name soon changed in 1960 to the Blue House Presidential Police with a Security Force raised in 1961 to closely guard Park Chung Hee.

The unit had a name change again, this time to the PSS, after the PSS Law 157 had passed in 1963 with Hong Jong Chul as its first chief under the direction of the Gyeongmundae Police Force. Yet Pak Chong-gyu headed the PSS from 1963 to 1974. PSS responsibilities were increased after North Korean soldiers of the 124th Army Unit attacked the Blue House in 1968.

In 1974, the PSS was granted more power over the South Korean military and various law enforcement agencies under the enactment of Security Committee for presidential protection (Executive Order 7246) and of Security Control Unit for presidential protection (Executive Order 7246) after Park Chung Hee's wife, Yuk Young-soo, was killed.

The abolition of the Security Committee for presidential protection (Executive Order 9692) and abolition of Security Control Unit for presidential protection (Executive Order 9692) came in 1979 after Park Chung Hee had been assassinated. In 1981, the PSS was mandated, by the revision of PSS directives, to protect former South Korean presidents and their families.

The PSS was involved in the close protection of Pope John Paul II during an attempt to attack him when he visited the country on May 6, 1984, in Seoul.

On February 1, 1989, the Cheongnamdae (Presidential retreat) guard squad was formed.

On April 1, 1993, the Mugunghwa Dongsa (Clearing away of the security house) division was created to act as a counter-terrorism unit. On March 3, 1999, a PSS Multi Security Training Center was created.

During the 2002 FIFA World Cup, the PSS established the Cheong Wa Dae World Cup Safety Measures Team and the World Cup Security & Safety Control Division to bolster security on South Korean soil.

The PSS was relieved of their guard duties of the Blue House on April 18, 2003, as jurisdiction was given to the Chungcheongbuk-do Provincial Government. On January 1, 2005, the Pusan APEC Security Safety Control Group was established by the PSS.

The Presidential Security Safety Measures Committee was legalized as a committee on March 10, 2005.

PSS has been through numerous changes across administrations, such as the status of its head – ministerial or vice-ministerial – and organisation itself from the office to the division as well as its hierarchy within the Office of the President. President Moon Jae-in lowered the status of the head of PSS to a vice ministerial level and downgraded its status to an independent division under the President.

In January 2025, the PSS actively prevented authorities from carrying out the arrest of Yoon Suk Yeol. The agency issued an official apology over the incident on 6 November 2025.

== Duties ==
Among the duties conducted by PSS agents include close protection for the following:

1. The President of South Korea and their family
2. The President-elect and their family
3. The Acting President and their spouse
4. Former presidents, as well as their spouses and children (will receive protection from the Security Service for a maximum of ten (10) years after leaving office, unless the protected subjects decline)
5. The heads of states or the heads of governments of foreign countries visiting South Korea, and their spouses
6. Any other domestic and foreign persons that the Chief of the Presidential Security Service deems to be necessary to protect

== Organization ==
As of 2008, the PSS had been organized into the following:

- Head of the PSS
  - Inspector General
- Vice Head of the PSS
  - Headquarters for Innovation & Planning
  - Headquarters for Administration
  - Headquarters for Protection
  - Headquarters for Intelligence & Security
  - Headquarters for Education & Training

The PSS has a code and a pledge that its agents must abide by at all times:

== Code and Pledge ==
=== Code ===
- Unity - The will for unity amongst all and conformity with the President reflecting the teamwork orientated characteristic of security duties
- Loyalty - The very basic mental attitude of security agents towards the nation and its people
- Eternity - Security duties pursue eternal honor to the end by being with the President with a precondition of self-sacrifice
- Honor - Expertise and dignity of the security duty based on sacrifice and service

=== Pledge ===
1. One, we will lay down our lives for the successful execution of our duties.
2. Another, we will act in a righteous and truthful manner.
3. Third, we will firmly unify on the basis of mutual trust.
4. Fourth, we will guard the preservation of public peace like our lives.
5. Fifth, we will guard the honor and maintain dignity.

== Firearms ==
- Beretta Px4 Storm
- Heckler & Koch MP7
- Heckler & Koch UMP
- Daewoo Precision Industries K1
