= Pro-Americanism =

Admiration for the United States

Public opinion on the US (2026): < -40 -40 to -20 -20 to -5 -4 to +4 +5 to +20 +20 to +34 +35 to +49 +50 to +64 > +65

Pro-Americanism (also called pro-American sentiment and Americophilia) describes support, love, or admiration for the United States, the American government and the American economic system, its foreign policy, the American people, and/or American culture, typically on the part of people who are not American citizens or otherwise living outside of the United States. In this sense, it differs from Americanism (American patriotism), which can generally only be adhered to by American citizens or residents, although adherents of any of these may subscribe to overlapping concepts, such as American exceptionalism. Pro-Americanism is contrasted with Anti-Americanism, which is the fear or hatred of things American.

== History ==
=== 18th and 19th centuries ===
In the late 18th century, European monarchical powers such as France and Spain viewed America positively, as an ally or potential ally against their imperial rival Great Britain, with both countries supplying aid to the American revolutionaries. However, the American Revolution also provided inspiration to the French Revolution and various revolutions against Spanish rule in Latin America. These connections would later be recognized with grand gestures such as France's donation of the Statue of Liberty (Liberty Enlightening the World) to the United States in 1886. European visitors such as Alexis de Tocqueville often wrote glowingly of American dynamism and liberty, and America's lack of immigration controls throughout the 18th and 19th centuries spurred mass immigration from Europe that established a positive image of America as a land of freedom and opportunity in the European imagination. Meanwhile, following the opening up of Asian nations such as Japan and China to international trade, many Asians viewed America more favorably as a less nakedly imperialist nation compared to the European powers. However, America's imperialist expansion into the Pacific following its victory in the Spanish–American War in 1898 eventually put it on a collision course with Japan.

=== 20th century ===
America won gratitude and favor from many Europeans for coming to the defense of Western Europe twice in the First and Second World Wars, while earning ire from enemies such as Germany and Japan. America earned further approval from Europeans, and later Asian countries such as Japan and Taiwan, for standing against its ideological opponents the Soviet Union and Communist China in the Cold War. As part of the Cold War, America engaged in a global struggle with the Soviet Union to win hearts and minds, seeking to promote pro-Americanism in the developing world, often through foreign and military aid. Worldwide pro-American sentiment evaporated during America's protracted and unpopular war in Vietnam, with anti-American protests arising around the globe, but pro-American sentiment eventually made a comeback following America's withdrawal from Vietnam in 1975. America proved good at mollifying former wartime enemies, with former opponents such as Germany, Japan, and Vietnam all coming to embrace pro-Americanism by century's end. During the 20th century, Hollywood movies and other forms of popular culture proved a powerful vector for spreading American ideas and fomenting pro-American sentiments all around the world.

=== 21st century ===
Countries around the world were highly sympathetic to the United States after the September 11 attacks, often viewing the attack on the U.S. as an attack on a free and open world. However, anti-American sentiments returned when the United States responded with highly unpopular wars in Iraq and Afghanistan. Pro-Americanism rose with the election of Barack Obama.

Although peoples embracing pro-American sentiments have necessarily shifted over time, in tandem with changing geopolitical circumstances, since late 2010s pro-Americanism has been strong or growing in regions such as India, Israel, Kenya, Nigeria, Vietnam, the Philippines, and certain countries in Central and Eastern Europe.

Results of 2026 Pew Research Center poll "% who have a(n) favorable/unfavorable opinion of the United States" (default-sorted by decreasing negativity of each country)
Country polled	Favorable	Unfavorable	Difference
Israel	81%	19%	+62
Ghana	68%	22%	+46
Nigeria	63%	32%	+31
Kenya	63%	35%	+28
Colombia	60%	35%	+25
Argentina	44%	44%	+22
Hungary	58%	38%	+20
Philippines	56%	41%	+15
India	45%	31%	+14
Peru	51%	38%	+13
Poland	49%	43%	+6
Sri Lanka	42%	40%	+2
Brazil	47%	43%	0
Japan	50%	50%	0
South Korea	45%	55%	-10
Mexico	40%	55%	-15
Chile	37%	53%	-16
United Kingdom	41%	58%	-17
South Africa	35%	55%	-20
Greece	37%	60%	-23
Thailand	36%	63%	-27
Singapore	34%	66%	-32
Canada	33%	66%	-33
Bangladesh	26%	63%	-37
Italy	31%	69%	-38
Indonesia	29%	70%	-41
France	27%	70%	-43
Germany	27%	71%	-44
Spain	30%	67%	-37
Netherlands	25%	71%	-46
Australia	24%	76%	-52
Malaysia	19%	80%	-61
Sweden	19%	80%	-61
Pakistan	15%	81%	-66
Turkey	13%	84%	-71
West Bank	9%	81%	-72

Pro-Americanism declined in the late 2010s in Canada, Latin America, the Middle East, and the European Union, due in part to the strong worldwide unpopularity of the Donald Trump administration. Pro-Americanism initially rebounded following the 2020 election of Joe Biden as America's new president, but started to decline again by 2024. Pro-Americanism around the world declined sharply after the re-election of Donald Trump in the 2024 election.

== Pro-Americanism by region ==
=== Africa ===
During the era of colonialism, Africans viewed the United States in a highly favorable light. Americans were seen as the "fearless guardians of freedom and equality" and the "conscience of the world" due to the United States' status as a powerful Western nation that was not involved in the colonization of Africa. Nigerian statesman and independence leader Nnamdi Azikiwe described the United States as "God's country", stating: "deep in my heart I can honestly confess that the United States of America has impressed me as a haven of refuge for the oppressed sections of humanity in Europe, Africa, Asia, and the rest of the world". African newspapers such as The Lagos Standard highly idealized early American leaders such as Thomas Jefferson and George Washington, while acknowledging but disregarding the fact that they were slave owners. African newspapers portrayed a highly mythicized life of African-Americans that made them seem equal and sometimes superior to whites. They praised African-American figures such as Booker T. Washington, Paul Robeson, and W.E.B. du Bois and highlighted the achievements of African-American entrepreneurs and farmers while often ignoring the racial segregation and discrimination that existed.

=== Asia ===
==== Bangladesh ====
Despite being close to India, pro-Americanism varies widely in Bangladesh. According to a poll in 2014, 76% of Bangladeshis held a favorable view of the United States, whereas according to a poll in 2024, 66% of Bangladeshis held a favorable view of the United States. After Sheikh Hasina's ouster in 2024, pro-Americanism rose in Bangladesh, with a number of politicians seeking to align Bangladesh with the US.

==== India ====
During the Cold War, India received extensive technological and military aid from the Soviet Union, leading the United States to provide aid to India's rival Pakistan and causing the rise of anti-American sentiment in India. Murli Manohar Joshi, founding member of the Hindu right wing Bharatiya Janata Party had famously coined the slogan "Potato Chips; No, Computer Chips; Yes" during the 1998 general elections to express opposition towards 'infiltration' of decadent American culture among Indians in the aftermath of the 1991 economic liberalisation programmes. However, since the end of the Cold War, & revelations about covert Pakistani support towards Taliban against US occupation of Afghanistan going as far as to provide shelter to Osama bin Laden at Abbottabad & use of American aid to sponsor terrorist activities against India, notably the 26/11 attacks, American support decisively moved away from Pakistan & shifted to India. Pro-Americanism has been growing in India, especially as both India and the United States have come to see China as a shared rival (India due to border disputes, & the US due to trade war). Pro-Americanism is especially high among educated and high-income Indians, but is present among Indians of all classes. A 2023 Pew Research Centre survey states that around 70–72% of adult Indians view American global influence in positive light, despite being critical of US intervensionism & its cultural impact, with Hollywood being the main target.

==== Israel ====
In contrast to other Middle Eastern countries hostile to the United States, Israel is a pro-American country; it has long been considered a pro-American security asset in the Middle East by Ronald Reagan and other American conservatives.

During the early Cold War period (before the Soviet Union severed ties with Israel in the wake of Six-Day War in 1967), left-wing/socialist Zionists, including Golda Meir, aimed for friendly diplomatic relations not only with the United States but also with the Soviet Union; by contrast, conservative Zionists, including Menachem Begin, had stronger pro-American/anti-Soviet foreign policies as an extension of free markets and anti-communism.

Likud, Israel's right-wing conservative party founded by Begin, is traditionally known for its strong pro-American stance.

==== Japan ====
Despite growing diplomatic tensions with the United States, Japanese people were already greatly influenced by American culture in the first half of the 20th century, particularly baseball, Hollywood films, and jazz. Babe Ruth visited Japan in 1934, while Charlie Chaplin visited in 1932 and twice in 1936; all of these visits generated great enthusiasm among the Japanese public.

After the Asia-Pacific War, pro-Americanism began to appear once more in Japan during the U.S. military occupation of Japan, which many Japanese came to view as having brought Japan freedom and democracy after years under a totalitarian military dictatorship. However, the presence of U.S. military bases remained a constant irritant, and the unpopular Vietnam War provided another source of anti-American sentiment in Japan. Nevertheless, since reaching a postwar nadir during the massive 1960 Anpo protests against the U.S.-Japan Security Treaty, pro-American sentiment has gradually risen in Japan, such that Japan is one of the most pro-American countries in the world. Historically, pro-Americanism was embraced by the "Old Right" in Japan, which sought to make common cause with the United States against worldwide communism, and aimed to gradually remilitarize Japan under the U.S. nuclear umbrella as a partner in the U.S.-Japan alliance, whereas the "Old Left, the "New Left," and the "New Right" tended to embrace anti-American sentiments in seeking immediate break with America and the expulsion of U.S. military forces from Japanese soil. However, recent decades have seen the eclipse of the Left in Japan and the ascendancy of "Old Right" ideas over those of the "New Right," as seen in the popularity of former prime minister Shinzō Abe, who embraced the "Old Right" ideas of his grandfather Nobusuke Kishi and worked closely with the United States in strengthening the U.S.-Japan alliance.

The Liberal Democratic Party, which plays a key role in de facto one-party system of Japanese politics, has been described as a "pro-American conservative".

Japan's far-right groups ("Uyoku dantai") have been consistent in traditional anti-Chinese, anti-Korean, and anti-Russian sentiments, but after World War II, some far-right groups have actively embraced pro-Americanism; for example, the ultra-conservative Greater Japan Patriotic Party combines hard-line pro-Americanism with Japanese nationalism.

==== South Korea ====
Pro-American sentiment has been strong in South Korea throughout the postwar era, as the threatening presence of North Korea has led South Koreans to make common cause with the United States against communism, most notably in the Korean War and the Vietnam War. Pro-Americanism tends to be especially strong among older South Koreans and conservative South Koreans, with conservative parties often flying American flags alongside the South Korean flag at marches and political rallies. Anti-American sentiment has appeared among younger South Koreans at times, especially in relation to US support towards the military dictatorships of Syngman Rhee, Park Chungh Hee and Chun Doo Hwan, crimes and accidents by US servicemen stationed in South Korea in the 1990s and early 2000s, as well as the 2008 US beef protest in South Korea in which the United States was viewed as bullying South Korea into accepting imports of American beef, which some South Koreans viewed as unsafe. However, with China recently increasingly seen as a threat to South Korea, pro-Americanism has been once again on the rise, despite concerns about Korea Passing.

Favorable attitudes towards America declined following the re-election of Donald Trump in 2024 due to doubts about the reliability of the United States as an ally. According to a Pew Research poll in 2025, 61% of South Koreans held a favorable opinion of the United States, down from 77% in 2024, while 39% held an unfavorable opinion, up from 19% in 2024. According to an October 2025 KStatResearch poll, 56% of South Koreans had a favorable view of the United States, while 40% had a negative view.

==== Taiwan ====
Taiwanese nationalists want to be free from opposition and threats from the People's Republic of China (PRC) to Taiwanese independence. Modern Taiwanese nationalists are therefore very friendly to the United States and support military, economic, and cultural cooperation as a strategic necessity. Taiwanese nationalism is often seen as "anti-imperialism" since it opposes Chinese imperialism, which denies Taiwan its right to self-determination, even though it does not oppose American imperialism, which is seen as friendly to Taiwan. The Democratic Progressive Party (DPP) is Taiwan's leading pro-American political party. Lai Ching-te, the current president of Taiwan, has often been described as being "pro-U.S." in international media.

Taiwan's far-right parties, including the New Party, Patriot Alliance Association and Chinese Unification Promotion Party have anti-American attitudes due to their sympathy for the PRC and their support of Chinese unification, but the centre-right conservative Kuomintang has a rather favorable view of the United States.

=== North America ===
==== Alberta ====
The most vocal group in Alberta advocating for annexation to the United States is the Alberta 51 Project, founded in 2020 by Peter Downing. Among the group's stated goals are the elimination of customs barriers, a stronger military presence, the protections of the US Constitution, enhanced protection for land and resources, and economic stability through the U.S. dollar. During an event in Calgary where American political commentator Tucker Carlson spoke with Alberta Premier Danielle Smith, members of the Alberta 51 Project staged a minor demonstration. Demonstrators displayed signs and a Trump 2024 campaign flag in support of Alberta annexationism.

In 2025, the Republican Party of Alberta was formed, and modeled after the US Republican Party.
