= 2024 South Korean martial law crisis =

Failed coup d'état in South Korea

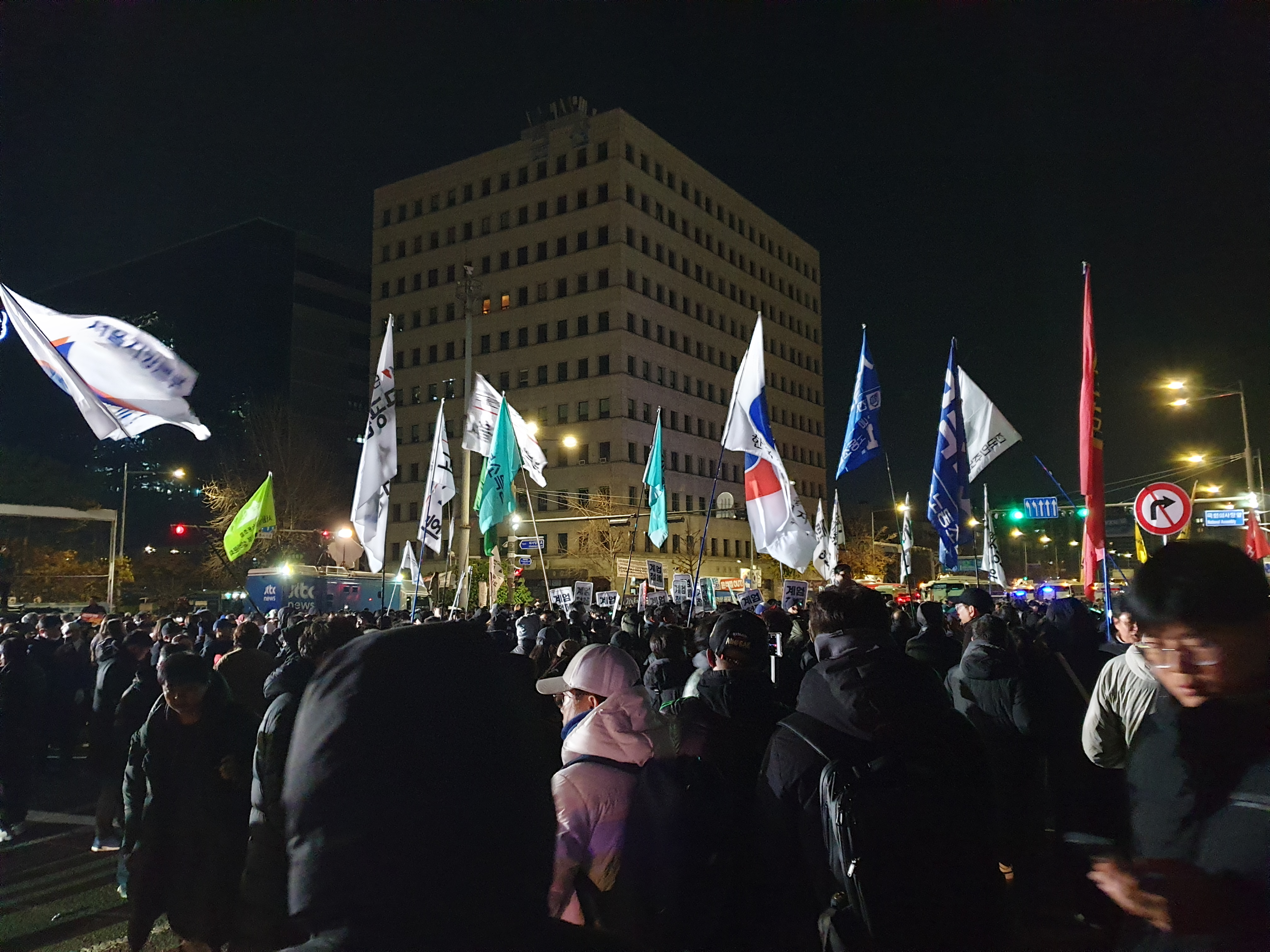
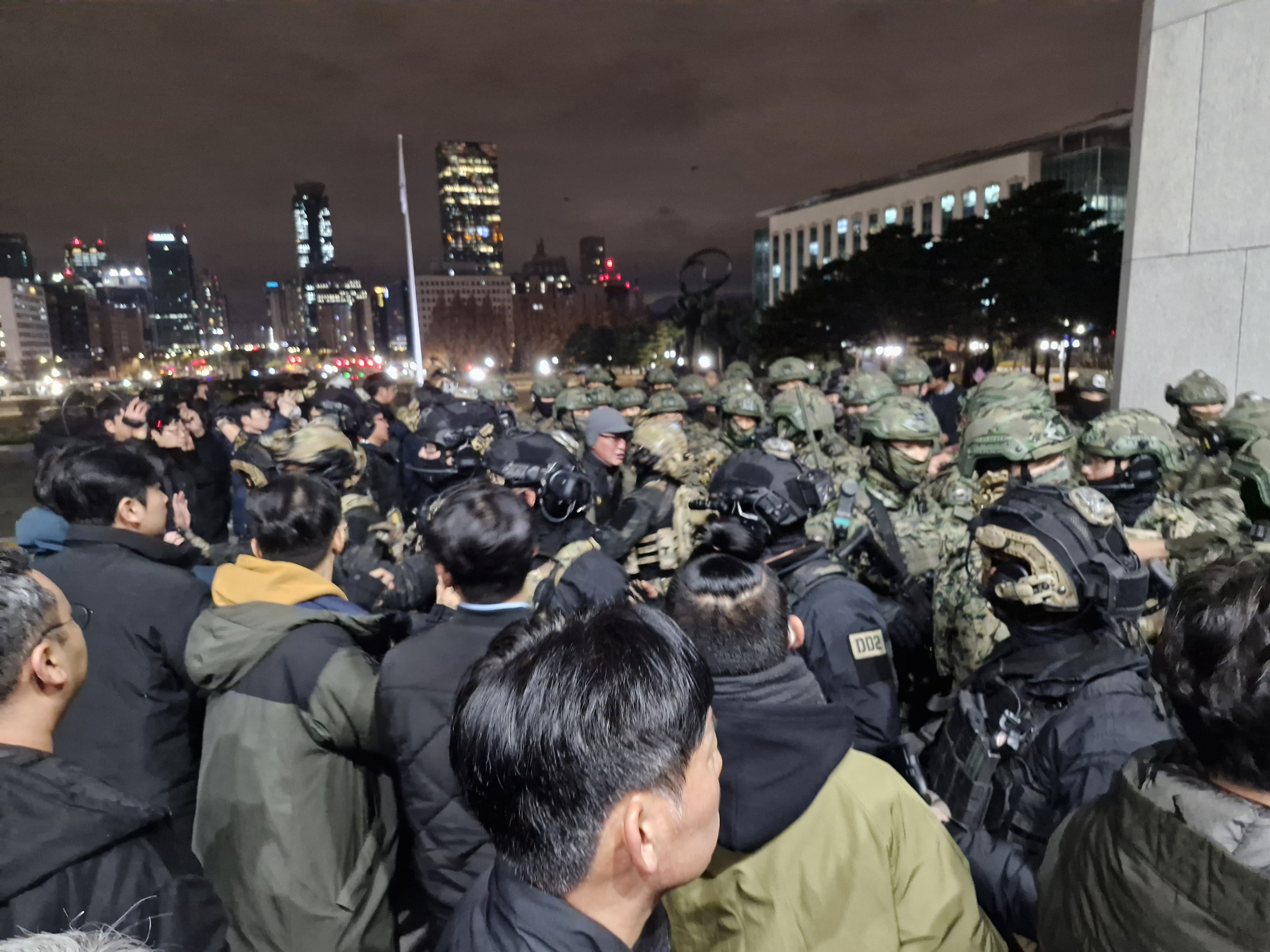
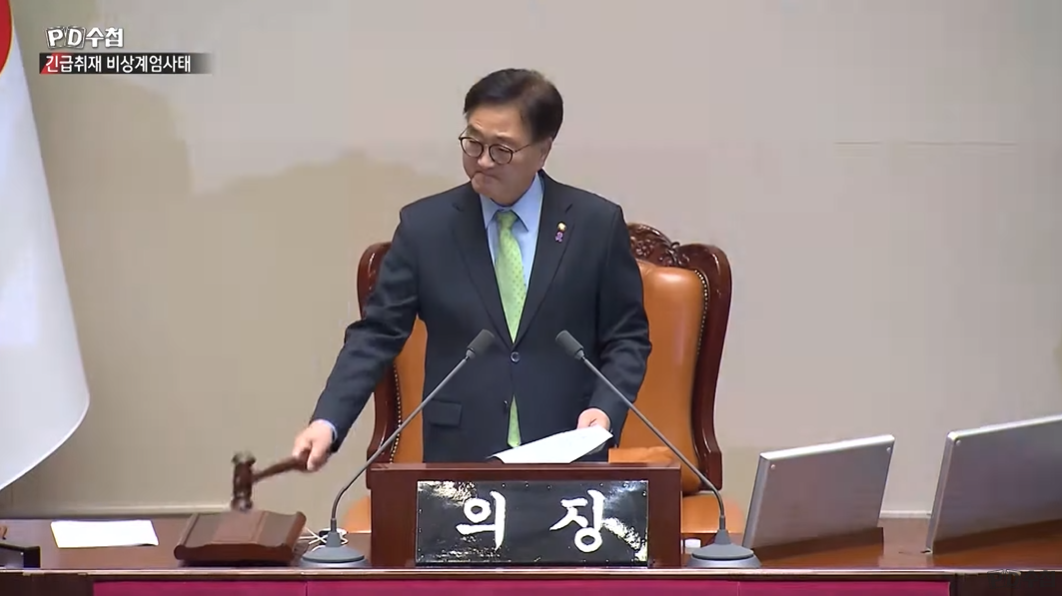
- Protest outside the National Assembly shortly after the declaration (top); Soldiers clashing with citizens outside the National Assembly (bottom left); Speaker Woo Won-shik announcing the National Assembly voted 190–0 to end martial law (bottom right)
- Date: Martial law imposition: 3–4 December 2024; 22:27 – 04:30 (UTC+9); Political aftermath: See § Aftermath; 4 December 2024 – 4 April 2025 (4 months)
- Location: South Korea
- Caused by: Opposition to budget proposals; Attempted impeachment of prosecutors involved in scandals; 2024 legislative election fraud conspiracy theory claims; Criminal investigations launched by opposition parties against First Lady Kim Keon-hee
- Goals: Dissolution of the National Assembly and opposition parties; Rule by decree; Control of the media and freedom of speech; Arrest of various political opponents
- Result: National Assembly defies blockage and votes for lifting of martial law; Yoon lifts martial law; Resignations and arrests of ministers and members of Yoon's cabinet; Nationwide protests; Impeachments of Yoon Suk Yeol and Han Duck-soo (the latter was later overturned by the Constitutional Court); Snap presidential election held on 3 June 2025; Lee Jae Myung elected as president; Yoon and other figures are found guilty of insurrection charges. Yoon is sentenced to life in prison.

Parties
Yoon Suk Yeol government; Ministry of National Defense; Republic of Korea Army; Capital Defense Command; 1st Security Group; ROKA Special Warfare Command; 707th Special Mission Group; 1st Special Forces Brigade; 13th Special Mission Brigade; Defense Counterintelligence Command; Defense Intelligence Agency; Ministry of the Interior and Safety; National Police Agency; Seoul Metropolitan Police Agency; National Fire Agency	22nd National Assembly; Democratic Party (DP); People Power Party (PPP) (Note: Opposed the declaration of martial law but the majority of its legislators boycotted the first impeachment motion and voted against the second); Rebuilding Korea Party (RKP); Reform Party (RP); Progressive Party; Basic Income Party (BIP); BISANG Action; Korean Confederation of Trade Unions; Federation of Korean Trade Unions; People's Solidarity for Participatory Democracy; Lawyers for a Democratic Society; and 1,739 other entities; Candlelight Action

Lead figures
President Yoon Suk Yeol (PPP); Kim Yong-hyun (MND); Park An-su (Martial Law Commander); Lee Sang-min (MIS); Lee Jin-woo (Martial Law Commander)	Speaker Woo Won-shik (Independent); Lee Jae Myung (DP); Han Dong-hoon (PPP); Hon. Moon Hyung-bae

On 3 December 2024, at 22:27 Korea Standard Time (KST), Yoon Suk Yeol, the then-president of South Korea, attempted a self-coup by declaring martial law during a televised address. In the address, he accused the Democratic Party (DPK), which held a majority in the National Assembly, of engaging in "anti-state activities" and collaborating with "North Korean communists" to undermine the country, describing their dominance as a "legislative dictatorship". The declaration suspended political activities, including sessions of the National Assembly and local legislatures, and imposed restrictions on the press. Yoon ordered the arrest of several political opponents, including leaders of both the DPK and his own People Power Party (PPP). It was the first declaration of martial law in South Korea since the military dictatorship of General Chun Doo-hwan in 1980.

The declaration was opposed by both parties and resulted in protests. At 01:02 on 4 December, 190 legislators who had arrived at the National Assembly Proceeding Hall unanimously passed a motion to lift martial law, despite attempts by the Republic of Korea Army Special Warfare Command to prevent the vote. At 04:30, Yoon and his cabinet lifted martial law and soon disbanded the Martial Law Command. The opposition began impeachment proceedings against Yoon and said it would continue to do so if he did not resign. Uproar over the declaration led to the resignation of several officials in Yoon's administration, including Defense Minister Kim Yong-hyun, who had urged Yoon to enact martial law shortly before the declaration and was second-in-command of the martial law order. Yoon, military officers, and other officials of Yoon's administration were investigated for their role in the implementation of the decree.

On 7 December, Yoon issued an apology for declaring martial law. The next day, the former Defense Minister Kim was arrested and sent to a detention facility for his role in the martial law order, where he attempted suicide shortly before a warrant could be filed against him. On 12 December, Yoon said that he would "fight to the end" and that the martial law declaration was an "act of governance" to protect against anti-state forces. It is more widely believed that the declaration was motivated by political issues with the DPK-controlled Assembly over repeated impeachment attempts against officials, opposition to his budget, and various scandals involving him and his wife Kim Keon Hee.

Yoon was impeached on 14 December by the National Assembly and suspended from office pending a final ruling by the Constitutional Court on whether to confirm his removal from the presidency. Prime Minister Han Duck-soo served as acting president until he himself was impeached on 27 December, making Finance Minister and Deputy Prime Minister Choi Sang-mok acting president. However, Han's impeachment was overturned by the Constitutional Court on 24 March 2025, reinstating him as acting president. Yoon was arrested on 15 January 2025. On 26 January, he was indicted for leading an insurrection, becoming the first sitting president to be arrested and indicted in South Korean history. On 4 April, the Constitutional Court unanimously upheld Yoon's impeachment and removal from office over the martial law declaration. On 19 February 2026, Yoon and other figures involved in the incident were found guilty on insurrection charges. Yoon was sentenced to life in prison, while Kim Yong-hyun was sentenced to 30 years in prison.

== Background ==
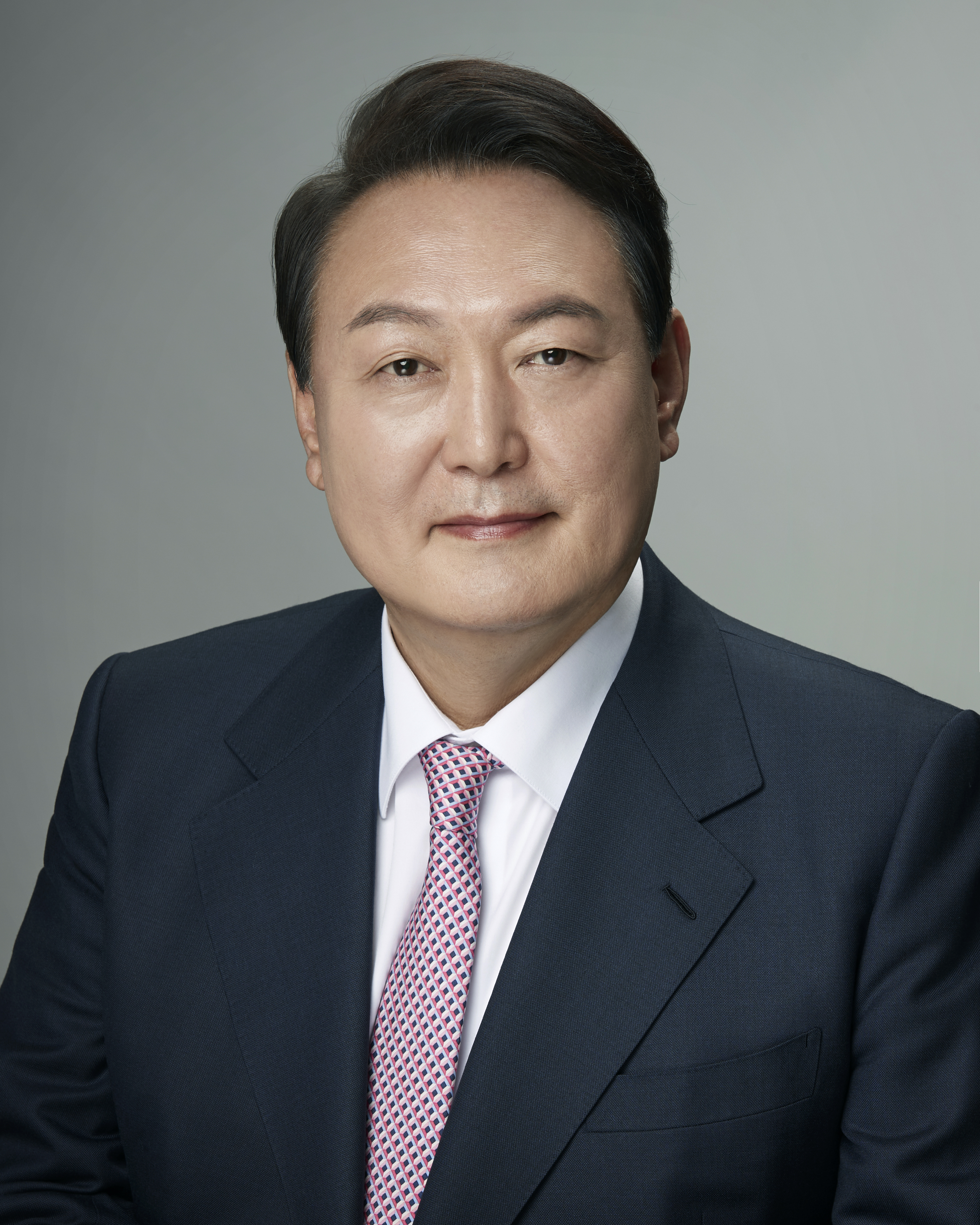
President Yoon Suk Yeol in 2022

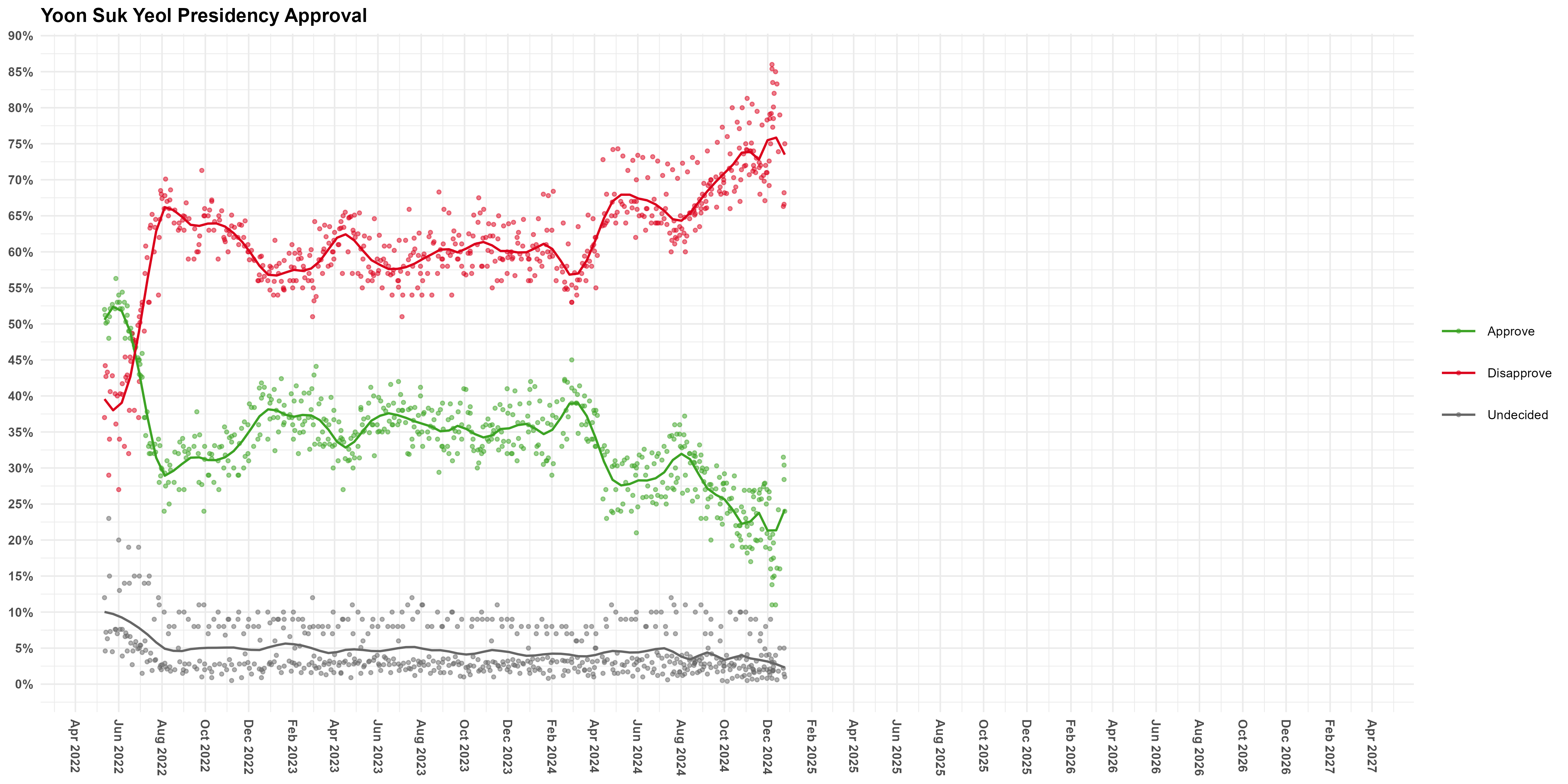
Opinion polling on the Yoon Suk Yeol presidency

South Korea has been governed as a presidential democracy under the 1987 constitution, which provides for a strong executive independent of the legislature. Yoon Suk Yeol, a member of the conservative People Power Party (PPP) and former prosecutor general, took office as President of South Korea following his victory in the 2022 election.

Yoon has been criticized for far-right political views. His administration had low approval ratings, reaching as low as 17%; in a November 2024 survey, 58% of the population supported either Yoon's resignation or impeachment. Yoon struggled to achieve his agenda due to opposition from the National Assembly, controlled by the opposition Democratic Party (DPK) since 2020. In the April 2024 legislative election, the opposition retained its majority, but lacked the two-thirds majority (200 out of 300) required under the constitution to impeach the president.

Yoon boycotted the opening of the National Assembly, even though it is customary for the president to deliver a speech at the event. Yoon also opposed investigations into scandals involving his wife Kim Keon-hee and top officials, vetoing three separate bills that called for a special counsel investigation into his wife, the third occurring on 26 November 2024. On 2 December 2024, the opposition-controlled parliament moved to impeach Board of Audit and Inspection Chair Choe Jae-hae and three prosecutors involved in two scandals surrounding Kim, and rejected the government's 2025 budget proposal.

=== Early planning of martial law ===
During prosecution questioning, former Defense Counterintelligence Command (DCC) commander Lieutenant General Yeo In-hyung testified that President Yoon first mentioned "taking emergency action" to address "difficult social issues" in late December 2023, which Yeo interpreted as referring to the martial law declaration. At the end of March 2024, President Yoon invited the then-Defense Minister Shin Won-sik, National Intelligence Service Director Cho Tae-yong, and Presidential Security Service Director Kim Yong-hyun for dinner and reportedly expressed his intention to "declare martial law soon". At the dinner, Minister Shin and Director Cho expressed their opposition. Minister Shin, concerned about the implementation of martial law, called Director Kim and then-DCC commander Yeo in private right after the dinner to discuss blocking any such moves. Yeo added that Yoon started mentioning martial law more often following the PPP's defeat in the April 2024 legislative election. Eventually, Shin was shuffled out of the role of Defense Minister to become Director of the Office of National Security, while Kim Yong-hyun was selected to replace Shin in September 2024. The 27 December 2024 unsealed indictment of Kim Yong-hyun revealed that President Yoon met with former Minister Kim, Commander Yeo, and others about 10 times since March 2024 to discuss the imposition of martial law.

=== Warnings of a plot to declare martial law ===
In October 2021, years before the declaration of martial law, Yoon made complimentary remarks about the former authoritarian military dictator of South Korea, Chun Doo-hwan. The remarks came during a meeting with People Power Party officials in Busan, during which Yoon said that "many people still consider Chun as having done well in politics, except the military coup and the Gwangju Uprising", later adding that he believed even people in Honam, the geographic area including Gwangju, felt the same way.

After Yoon was elected president, when asked about the possibility of pressure and protests by opposition parties and citizens, Defense Minister Kim Yong-hyun responded: "Why worry about it? Just declare martial law and sweep it all away." Yoon began appointing his fellow Chungam High School alumni as high-ranking figures in his administration and the military, a group referred to as the Chungam Faction. Throughout his political career, several of Defense Minister Kim's former high school alumni said that his favorite book to read was Adolf Hitler's autobiographical manifesto Mein Kampf. DPK Representative Choo Mi-ae confirmed this during a televised interview, which added to many people's suspicion that Kim, having risen to such a powerful position within both the military and the government, may have been driven by darker instincts rather than a sense of duty to national security.

In September 2024, three months before the martial law declaration, some DPK politicians began suggesting that Yoon was preparing martial law. Party leader Lee Jae Myung alluded to "speculation about martial law preparations", saying that Yoon appointing Kim Yong-hyun as Defense Minister was a part of a martial law strategy to prevent Kim Keon-hee from going to prison. Kim Min-seok, member of the party's Supreme Council, stated: "I have well-founded reasons to believe that the conservative Yoon administration is drawing up a contingency plan to declare martial law." The Presidential Office dismissed this claim as "groundless". People Power Party floor leader Choo Kyung-ho also denied the possibility of martial law, saying "Such theories ... are no more than scare tactics and propaganda based purely on imagination".

Kim Min-seok justified his prediction of a martial law declaration by Yoon by adding that he was "one of the people who obtained information and reported that the government was preparing to invoke martial law during the impeachment of President Park Geun-hye" in 2016, despite denials by the Park government at the time. A document was produced in secret by the Defense Security Command (now the Defense Counterintelligence Command) in February 2017 that considered invoking martial law in anticipation of continued street protests if Park Geun-hye was not removed by the Constitutional Court. The 67-page document titled "Wartime Martial Law and Joint Action Plan" contained specific plans including mobilizing tanks to suppress candlelight protests in Gwanghwamun in the event that the impeachment of Park was dismissed, and arresting and detaining lawmakers to prevent the National Assembly from reaching the quorum required to lift martial law if lawmakers attempted to do so (similar to the martial law plans of 2024).

Several South Korean Defense Ministers have had major roles in either declarations of martial law or self-coups in the past, with the most notable examples being Song Yo-chan, who declared martial law and demanded the resignation of President Syngman Rhee; and Chung Ho-yong, who had complicity in the Gwangju Uprising. During his confirmation hearing for Minister of National Defense at the National Assembly on 2 September 2024, Kim Yong-hyun was asked by members of the opposition as to whether he would declare martial law or recommend Yoon to do so. He replied: "I think talk about martial law is out of date; if it is declared, who would accept it? Do you think the military would even follow the order?" Kim was also questioned on his close personal ties with Yoon, as the two have known each other since high school. Kim took office as Minister of National Defense on 6 September. Over the following three months, he allegedly planned military rule under martial law.

Following the botched martial law implementation, Kim Min-seok cited the Yoon administration's usage of the term "anti-state forces", and the existence of the Chungam Faction as indications of Yoon's ulterior motive for martial law. He added that Yoon's government "is so bad at governance that they have no way of preventing their replacement other than martial law, terrorism, and mobilizing the legal system against their opponents". Documents obtained by Choo Mi-ae showed that the DCC had prepared documents and other related material on declaring martial law following orders from its commander, Lieutenant General Yeo In-hyung, in November 2024. Police investigators also found that Defense Intelligence Command chief Major General Moon Sang-ho, his predecessor, Roh Sang-won and former military police commander of the 3rd Field Army Command Kim Yong-gun also met at a Lotteria fast food restaurant in Ansan on 1 December to discuss preparations for the declaration. The Chungam Faction whom Yoon and Kim appointed to high ranking positions and cited as having a role in the martial law declaration were commander of the Defense Counterintelligence Command Yeo In-hyung, Chief of the Army Special Warfare Command Kwak Jong-geun, commander of the Defense Security Agency of the Defense Intelligence Agency Park Jong-seon, commander of the Capital Defense Command Lee Jin-woo, Minister of the Interior and Safety Lee Sang-min, director of the Planning and Management Office of the Counterintelligence Command Park Sung-ha, and Chief of the 101st Security Brigade Hwang Se-young.

Yoon and Kim met each other while attending Chungam High School. Kim also allegedly knew Yeo In-hyung subsequent to his graduation. Since the other members of the faction graduated years apart from both Yoon and Kim, they did not know them personally. It is alleged that Yoon met them sometime during his presidential campaign. The Chungam Faction has been compared to the Hanahoe faction of former dictator Chun Doo-hwan and his successor Roh Tae-woo.

=== Attempts to provoke North Korean crisis to justify martial law ===
Defense Minister Kim Yong-hyun at a joint meeting at The Pentagon with U.S. Secretary of Defense Lloyd Austin regarding North Korea relations on 30 October 2024

On 1 December, two days before martial law was declared, colonel-level commanders were called to be on guard for an imminent provocation by North Korea, with DCC Commander Yeo In-hyung giving orders to prepare for a "serious North Korean filth balloon situation". During police investigations into the martial law declaration, a memo was recovered from a notebook owned by former Army Maj. Gen. Roh Sang-won, former chief of the Defense Intelligence Command, in his residence in Ansan. The memo reportedly contained details of a plot to provoke North Korea by causing an incident along the Northern Limit Line. On 14 February 2025, the Hankyoreh reported that the notebook included, in addition to the North Korean plans, plans for detaining about 500 public figures and abolishing term limits to allow Yoon to potentially serve 3 terms. On 21 July 2025, Maj. Gen. Kim Yong-dae, head of the Drone Operations Command, was suspended from duty over suspicions that military drones were illegally dispatched to North Korea as part of preparations for Yoon's imposition of martial law.

=== Martial law powers and past occurrences ===
Martial law was a recurring tool used by military leaders to suppress dissent and consolidate power in South Korea's authoritarian, dictatorial past until the end of the Fifth Republic of Korea with the June Democratic Struggle of 1987, when South Korea transitioned to democracy under the Sixth Republic. This was the first time martial law had been declared in South Korea since the 1980 military coup d'état after the assassination of dictator Park Chung Hee, and the restoration of civil liberties in 1987. This was the 17th since the foundation of the republic in 1948.

According to the Martial Law Act, the declaration of martial law or alteration in its nature by the President shall undergo deliberation by the State Council. The Minister of National Defense or the Minister of the Interior and Safety may suggest the declaration of martial law to the President through the Prime Minister. Under Article 77 of the constitution, the president must immediately notify the National Assembly when declaring martial law. This enables special measures to be taken, including reducing the need for arrest warrants and restricting freedom of speech, the press, assembly, and association. The National Assembly can lift martial law by a simple majority vote. The president has no authority to suspend the Assembly by any means, and "during the enforcement of martial law, no member of the Assembly shall be arrested or detained unless he/she is caught in the act of committing a crime".

== Events ==
=== Events on 3 December before the martial law declaration ===
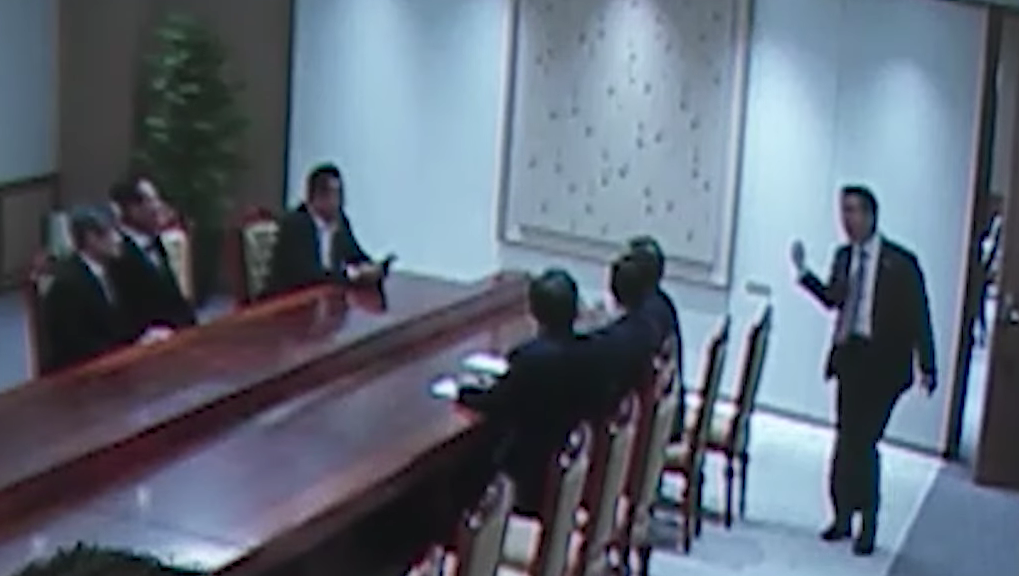
CCTV still showing numerous of President Yoon's cabinet members inside the Presidential Office shortly before the declaration. Defense Minister Kim is standing and gesturing how many more cabinet members are needed for a quorum for the meeting

On the morning of 3 December, former Army Maj. Gen. Roh Sang-won, former chief of the Defense Intelligence Command met with Defense Minister Kim at his official residence, for a meeting lasting 20 to 30 minutes. In the afternoon, Minister Kim instructed Army Chief of Staff, Gen. Park An-su, and five other military officials to report to his office at 21:30.

At 17:00 KST, units of the Republic of Korea Army Special Warfare Command, including the 707th Special Mission Group, 1st Special Forces Brigade, and the 13th Special Mission Brigade received orders to prepare for operations at an isolated area. The 707th SMG received a message to prepare for the conduct of a real-world operation by helicopter, and deployment on orders of Defense Minister Kim. They were told "the situation related to North Korea is serious", though an anonymous official reported there had been no movements by the North Korean military.

At 18:20, Korean National Police Commissioner Cho Ji-ho reportedly received an order from the Presidential Office to "be on standby". At a subsequent committee inquiry by the National Assembly, Cho claimed he did not know the martial law plan until its announcement. However, subsequent investigations revealed that Cho, and Seoul Metropolitan Police Agency Commissioner General Kim Bong-sik met with Minister Kim and President Yoon at 19:00, and the two police officials were given a list of about 10 people to be arrested along with plans to occupy the National Assembly and National Election Commission via a martial law declaration at 22:00.

At 21:50, broadcasting networks received a message: "There will be an emergency government announcement, please connect to the live broadcast". Journalists covering the Presidential Office were barred from entering the briefing room, where such broadcasts are normally made. Just before declaring martial law, Yoon reportedly told his cabinet members: "Even my wife doesn't know about this. Otherwise, she'd be furious."

=== Declaration of martial law ===
2024 South Korean martial law timeline
- 3 December (KST): 22:23: Yoon Suk Yeol makes his emergency address to the nation.; 22:27: Yoon Suk Yeol declares martial law.; 22:42: The opposition Democratic Party, which holds a legislative majority, urgently convenes National Assembly members.; 23:04: The National Assembly entrance is closed.; 23:25: Army Chief of Staff Park An-su is appointed martial law commander.; 23:30: Park An-su declares decree on martial law.; 23:45: Defense Minister Kim Yong-hyun orders the entire military to be on high alert.; Around 23:57: The 707th Special Mission Group of the Republic of Korea Armed Forces appear in front of the National Assembly Proceeding Hall, and clashes with aides and congressional staff continue.
- 4 December (KST): 00:12: Martial law troops attempt to enter the back door of the National Assembly.; 00:36: Airborne troops break through the glass windows of the National Assembly and enter.; 00:48: The National Assembly commence an emergency session to vote to end martial law.; 00:50: Yoon Suk Yeol and Kim Yong-hyun order Commander Kwak Jong-geun and Capital Defense Commander Lee Jin-woo to break through the plenary chamber doors to drag the lawmakers out.; 01:02: The National Assembly votes unanimously to lift martial law.; 01:08: Woo Won-shik, Speaker of the National Assembly, tells the military to leave the National Assembly Proceeding Hall.; 01:11: Martial law forces inside and outside the National Assembly begin to withdraw.; 04:26: Yoon Suk Yeol accepts the National Assembly's vote, withdraws the military, and announces in a public address that martial law would be lifted.; 04:30: Yoon Suk Yeol's cabinet approves a motion to terminate martial law.; 04:49: The Martial Law Command is disbanded.
- The full text of Translation:2024 Declaration of Martial Law in the Republic of Korea at Wikisource; The full text of 2024년 대한민국 비상계엄 선포 at Wikisource

At 22:23 on 3 December 2024, Yoon Suk Yeol began making his emergency address to the nation, and at 22:27, declared martial law. He accused the opposition of being an "anti-state ... den of criminals" and "trying to overthrow the free democracy" by impeaching members of his cabinet and blocking his budget plans. He asked citizens to believe in him and tolerate "some inconveniences", and also said that there was a North Korean conspiracy against the South Korean government.

Prime Minister Han Duck-soo was allegedly sidelined in the decision-making process leading up to the martial law declaration, and discussions were kept private between Yoon and Defense Minister Kim Yong-hyun. Kim urged Yoon to enact martial law during a cabinet meeting shortly before the official declaration that ran from 22:17 to 22:22, in which a majority of the 19 cabinet members were "strongly against" the decision. Yoon also ordered finance minister Choi Sang-mok to draft a budget for an emergency legislative body which was to have been created during the martial law declaration and ordered interior minister Lee Sang-min to cut off electricity and water supplies to media outlets critical of Yoon, specifically the Hankyoreh, the Kyunghyang Shinmun, MBC and JTBC, as well as the opinion polling agency Flower Research.

At 22:30, Defense Minister Kim addressed a video conference giving orders to all military commanders above the corps commander level and threatened officers with punishment for insubordination if they did not follow the orders. Yoon appointed Chief of Staff of the Republic of Korea Army Park An-su as his martial law commander. A defense ministry report obtained by DPK representative Bak Seung-a said that around 1,580 troops, 107 military vehicles, 12 Black Hawk helicopters and more than 9,000 rounds of live ammunition were deployed for the implementation of martial law. MBC reported that the military brought 4,980 blank ammunition rounds and 100 cartridges for stun guns throughout its mobilization for martial law, while 5,000 live ammunition rounds and some 3,000 blanks were deployed at the National Assembly alone.

On 26 May 2025, Choi Sang-mok, Han Duck-soo and Lee Sang-min were summoned for questioning by police. A day later, media reported that both Choi Sang-mok and Han Duck-soo were slapped with a travel ban by police, as further investigations and analysis of CCTV footage found inconsistencies between the footage and prior statements made by the three former officials over their involvement in the martial law declaration. CCTV footage obtained from the Presidential Office showed Prime Minister Han receiving and reviewing martial law documents just before Yoon declaring martial law in the reception room on the second floor of the President's office, thus showing that Han gave false testimony when he claimed that he had no foreknowledge.

Following the beginning of the special counsel investigation appointed in June 2025 by new president Lee Jae Myung, it was reported on 1 July by the Hankyoreh that after Yoon declared martial law, his deputy chief of staff Kang Eui-gu belatedly drafted a new martial law declaration to be signed by the prime minister and defense minister. Reportedly, Yoon and his advisers had realized the illegality of the martial law declaration and attempted to correct that retroactively, pursuant to Article 82 of the Constitution, which states: "The acts of the President under law shall be executed in writing, and such documents shall be countersigned by the Prime Minister and the members of the State Council concerned." Yoon had already failed to abide to this by failing to prepare written versions of his martial law declaration or notification to the National Assembly. Kang called Prime Minister Han with the plan of retroactively drafting a martial law declaration, with the signatures of Han, Yoon and Defense Minister Kim. Han signed this document, but later asked for it to be destroyed because a retroactive document could provoke more controversy if it became known. Kang Eui-gu was also believed to have forged minutes of Cabinet meeting to make it look like it lasted for 40 minutes, instead of the actual 5 minutes that took place.

=== Election Commission raids ===
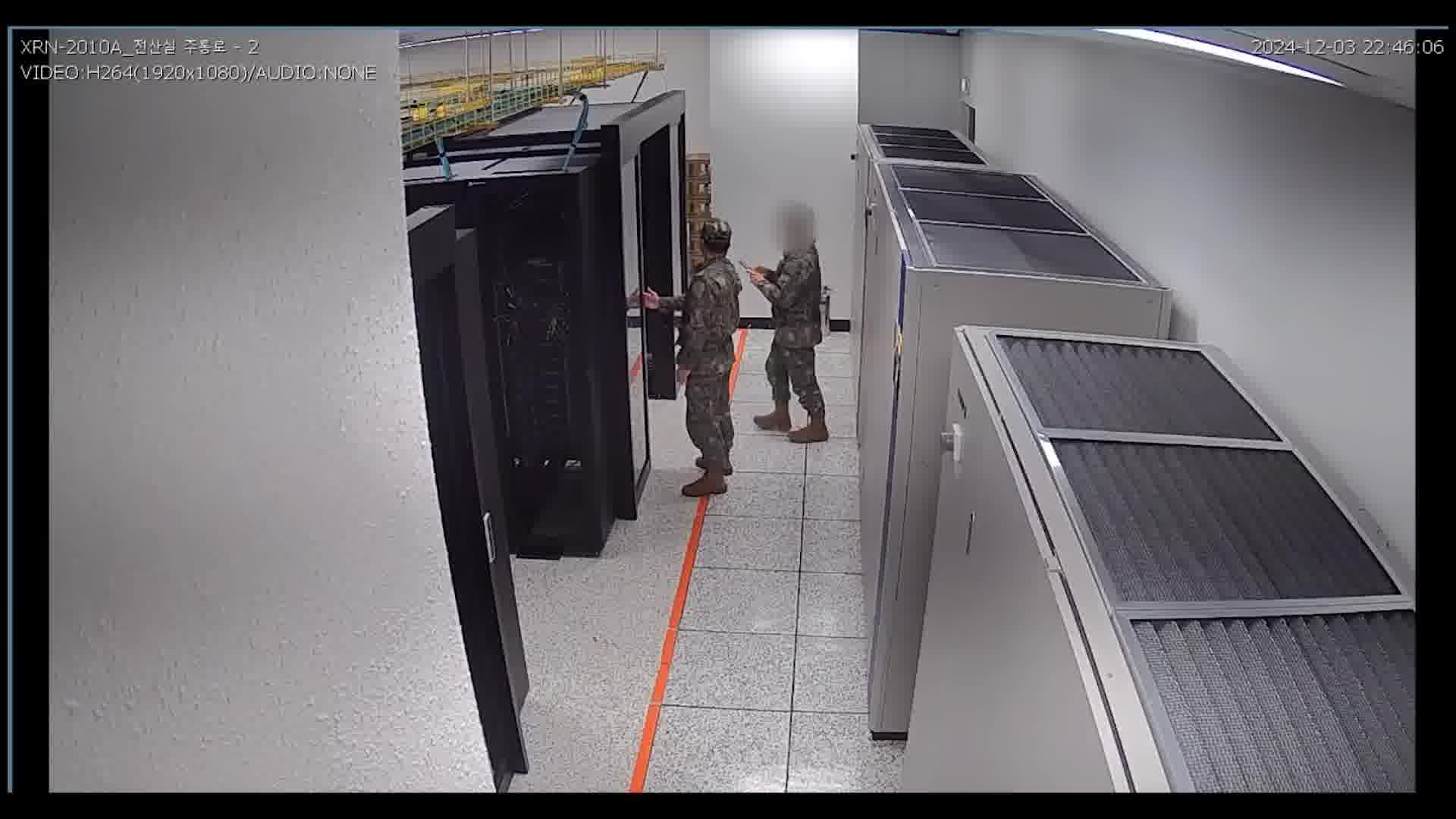
CCTV images of soldiers in the National Election Commission headquarters server room.

After martial law was declared, armed troops raided the National Election Commission (NEC) headquarters in Gwacheon, Gyeonggi Province (10 troops), one of its training centers in Suwon, Gyeonggi Province (130 troops) and the National Election Survey Deliberation Commission in Gwanak District in southern Seoul (47 troops). NEC officials allegedly had their phones confiscated.

Several operatives from the Intelligence Protection Group of the DCC with firearms and uniforms that were missing unit insignias and patches raided the server room located on the second floor of the NEC headquarters while the Special Warfare Command troops and National Police officers from Gyeonggi Nambu Provincial Police Agency provided perimeter security at the building. Lieutenant General Yeo In-hyung, head of the DCC and another member of the Chungam faction, was behind the raid. Commander Yeo made a call to KNP Commissioner Cho Ji-ho about the NEC headquarters raid, and Cho started supplying police forces for the troops.

Kim Yong-hyun said he deployed troops to determine the need for an investigation into the NEC's alleged "election fraud" in the April 2024 National Assembly election, a claim echoed by far-right YouTubers. These allegations have been repeatedly debunked by authorities. Representative Lee Jun-seok of the Reform Party, said that President Yoon repeatedly talked about election fraud while Lee was meeting him in his capacity as the leader of Yoon's PPP party, accusing Yoon of "being crazy" about conspiracy theories, and alleged that Yoon was surrounded by individuals who believed in conspiracy theories.

DCC martial law troops assigned to raid the NEC training center in Suwon questioned their deployment orders, and delayed their arrival by slowing their pace or pulling off at rest stops. On 9 December, Representative Lee released a report stating that a DCC brigadier general assaulted a major for questioning deployment orders and forced him on a bus to seize the NEC servers. Representative Lee said that some troops wasted time after arriving at the NEC by eating ramyeon at a nearby convenience store, after judging their deployment orders to be illegal. The brigadier general was identified as Kim Dae-woo, a close associate of DCC Commander Yeo.

On 12 December, Yoon alleged in a national address that the NEC's network system was vulnerable to cyberattacks and hacking, resulting in election fraud. The president accused the NEC of invoking constitutional immunity as an excuse to avoid inspection of its internal system in 2023 and claimed that the National Intelligence Service had discovered a North Korean hacking attack on the system. The NEC released a statement calling Yoon's allegation "baseless" and said Yoon's "raising suspicions of electoral fraud ... amounts to self-denial of the electoral management system through which he was elected president". The statement added that election fraud would require organized action from NEC aides, a breakdown of the security management system, and switching out identical amounts of actual voting papers, and called it "almost impossible". On 13 December, NEC Chairman Rho Tae-ak said in a National Assembly hearing that sending martial-law troops to take over the NEC was inexcusably illegal and unconstitutional. On 19 December, the NIS confirmed, in a report to the National Assembly, that there was no evidence of election rigging.

The unsealed indictment of former Minister Kim on 27 December revealed that Commander of the Intelligence Command Moon Sang-ho and his predecessor Roh Sang-won intended for 30 troops to detain NEC staff, tie them with ropes, put masks on their faces, and send them to the Water Defense Command Bunker for election fraud. Evidence was found of awls, ropes, hammers, cable ties and baseball bats belonging to the arrest team to be used when carrying out the arrests.

=== Plans for mass detention of political and public figures ===
At 22:28, Defense Minister Kim instructed DCC Commander Lieutenant General Yeo In-hyung to arrest several politicians on a target list. According to testimony by National Intelligence Service (NIS) Deputy Director Hong Jang-won to the National Assembly on 6 December, Yoon called him at 22:53 on 3 December and ordered him to help the DCC arrest his political opponents, and that Yoon wanted to "use this chance to arrest them and wipe them out". Hong testified that Yeo gave him a list of individuals targeted for arrest which included Democratic Party leader Lee Jae Myung, National Assembly Speaker Woo Won-shik, People Power Party leader Han Dong-hoon, Democratic Party Representative Kim Min-seok, Democratic Party floor leader Park Chan-dae, National Assembly Legislation and Judiciary Committee Chair Jung Chung-rae, Rebuilding Korea Party leader Cho Kuk, journalist Kim Ou-joon, former Supreme Court Chief Justice Kim Myeong-su, leader of the Candlelight Movement Kim Min-woong, and former National Election Commission (NEC) Chairman Kwon Soon-il.

Hong said that there were others on the list, including another NEC member whose name he could not recall and the head of a major labor union, either the Federation of Korean Trade Unions or the Korean Confederation of Trade Unions. Han Dong-hoon, the leader of Yoon's own People Power Party, confirmed that he was on the list of targets and that Yoon had planned to jail arrested politicians in a detention center in Gwacheon, south of Seoul. Upon receiving Yeo's instructions, Hong said he thought Yoon had lost his mind. He refused to comply, citing the NIS's lack of resources and means to carry out such an order. Yeo outlined plans to arrest first and second-tier targets in phases, detain them at DCC facilities, and conduct investigations. A bunker designated as an operations center for potential North Korean attacks and a military police compound, both operated by the Capital Defense Command in Seoul's Gwanak District, were also considered as detention sites.

Yoon then fired Hong. The report alleged Hong was given the orders because NIS Director Cho Tae-yong had previously refused to act on Yoon's arrest list. Troops were deployed in front of the building where Kim Ou-joon, a YouTuber and liberal journalist on the list of targets, created his videos. Kim said that soldiers were also deployed at his residence and posted footage showing about 20 armed soldiers standing outside his office in central Seoul.

On 9 December, Police Commissioner Cho testified before the Judiciary Committee of the National Assembly that he had received a call from DCC Commander Yeo sometime between 22:30 and 22:40 on 3 December, asking him to track the locations of politicians and others to carry out their arrests. The list of targets was consistent with what NIS Deputy Director Hong had revealed the previous week, except PPP leader Han Dong-hoon was added to the list later. Commissioner Cho said that he ignored the orders, on the grounds that location tracking itself was illegal and that court-issued arrest warrants were required to carry out arrests. On 13 December, a lawyer representing Commissioner Cho said that Yoon had also ordered the arrest of Seoul Central District Court Judge Kim Dong-hyun, who had acquitted Lee Jae Myung of perjury charges in November 2024.

On 14 February 2025, the Hankyoreh revealed that former Defense Intelligence Command leader Roh Sang-won's personal notebook contained plans to arrest "500-or-so people", which were not carried out on the night of 3 December. Other figures and alleged "leftist" judges and celebrities were included, while the notebook highlighted how the individuals would be "collected" and sent to detention centers. In addition to the names above as instructed by DCC commander Yeo, the individuals that were listed in the notebook included former President Moon Jae-in, Reform Party leader Lee Jun-seok, Seo Young-kyo, Ko Min-jung, Youn Kun-young, former Justice Ministers and current DPK legislators Choo Mi-ae and Park Beom-kye, former Chiefs of Staff to the President Noh Young-min and Im Jong-seok, Judge Yoo Chang-hun, comedian Kim Je-dong, former football star Cha Bum-kun, political commentator Rhyu Si-min, former Prime Minister Lee Hae-chan, and former Marine Corps investigator Park Jung-hun.

=== Orders for media blackout and cutting water and power to media outlets ===
National Fire Agency Commissioner Heo Seok-Gon testified before the National Assembly on 13 January 2025 that he received a phone call from Interior Minister Lee Sang-min to cooperate with the National Police Agency to cut off power and water to the offices of liberal-leaning media outlets and critics of Yoon's government, The Hankyoreh and the Kyunghyang Shinmun papers, and MBC TV station. Heo confirmed that, ultimately, no action was taken.

When prosecutors indicted Yoon for insurrection in February 2025, charges revealed that in addition to the three targets, Yoon ordered power and water to be cut for broadcaster JTBC and the pollster Flower Research. The indictment detailed Yoon directing the interior minister Lee at 22:30 on 3 December to halt power and water services to five organizations in order to instigate a "media blackout". Lee called National Police Agency Commissioner General Cho at 23:34 on the evening martial law was declared to check on the actions taken by the police, before calling National Fire Agency Commissioner Heo at 23:37 to inform him that the police would be deployed to the organizations around midnight and to cooperate with the National Police Agency to shut off power and water. Heo passed along the orders to Deputy Commissioner Lee Yeong-pal, who then called Hwang Gi-seok, the head of the Seoul Metropolitan Fire and Disaster Headquarters, and asked him several times to cooperate with any requests from the National Police Agency in connection with the martial law proclamation. Heo himself reportedly called Hwang at 23:50 to check whether the National Police Agency had asked for help.

=== Decree ===
At 23:25, on 3 December, Martial Law Commander Army General Park An-su issued the following decree which retroactively took effect at 23:00:

Martial Law Command proclaims the following as of 23:00 on 3 December 2024, in order to protect liberal democracy from anti-state forces active within the free Republic of Korea and their threats to subvert the state, and to ensure public safety.

1. All political activities, including activities of the National Assembly, local councils, political parties, and political association, rallies and demonstrations, are prohibited.
2. All acts that deny or attempt to overthrow the free democratic system are prohibited. The dissemination of fake news, manipulation of public opinion, and false propaganda are prohibited.
3. All media and publications are subject to the control of Martial Law Command.
4. Strikes, work stoppages, and rallies that incite social chaos are prohibited.
5. Trainee doctors and all other medical personnel, who are on strike or have left their worksites [see 2024 South Korean medical crisis], must return to their positions within 48 hours and work faithfully. Those who violate the order will face punishment in accordance with the Martial Law Act.
6. Innocent ordinary citizens, excluding anti-state forces and other subversive forces, will be subject to measures to minimize inconvenience in their daily lives.

Violators of the proclamation may be arrested, detained and searched without a warrant in accordance with Article 9 of the Martial Law Act (Special Measures Authority of the Martial Law Commander), and will be punished in accordance with Article 14 of the Martial Law Act (Penalties).

— Martial Law Commander, Army General Park An-su

Yoon's martial law decree went further than those of previous military dictators by suspending the National Assembly. However, it stopped short of ordering curfews or the closure of universities. The unsealed indictment of Defense Minister Kim on 27 December revealed that he had begun drafting the martial law decree on 24 November, by using reference to the martial law documents drafted under the leadership of the Defense Security Command during the Park Geun-hye impeachment in March 2017 and past martial law proclamations. President Yoon ordered a nighttime curfew reference to be dropped from the decree.

=== Immediate impact ===
The announcement of martial law was met by surprise and panic amongst the South Korean public. Following the declaration, the government said that activities in educational institutions and transport services would continue to operate normally. Panic-buying occurred in convenience stores nationwide. Demand for Telegram and VPNs increased after disruptions to internet portal Naver prompted fears of government censorship, although Naver and Kakao attributed this to an increase in user traffic. The Ministry of Science and ICT said it had not received any requests related to martial law.

Following the announcement, the Korean won fell to 1,444 against the US dollar, its weakest level in 25 months. It later rose to around 1,420, still weaker than the previous day's rate of 1,403. The iShares MSCI South Korea ETF decreased by 5%. Franklin FTSE South Korea ETF declined by 4.4% and Matthews Korea Active ETF fell 4.5%. A central bank official said it was preparing measures to stabilize the market if needed. Finance Minister and Deputy Prime Minister Choi Sang-mok convened an emergency meeting among top economic officials.

=== Immediate reaction of politicians ===
Lee Jae Myung climbing the National Assembly building fence at around 23:00 KST

National Assembly Speaker Woo Won-shik announced he would convene a plenary session immediately to revoke the martial law order and called for all lawmakers to gather at the National Assembly. All main parties, including Yoon's People Power Party, opposed the martial law declaration. PPP leader Han Dong-hoon said: "The president's martial law declaration is wrong. We will stop it along with the people". Seoul mayor Oh Se-hoon, a member of the PPP, also opposed the declaration. PPP floor leader Choo Kyung-ho said he only found out about the decree from the news. Controversially, Choo made an announcement to PPP legislators to report at party headquarters for a meeting instead of the National Assembly to vote down the martial law contrary to Han Dong-hoon and his faction, which led to allegations that he was colluding with Yoon's martial law plot. The special counsel bill passed by the National Assembly a week later to investigate key figures of the martial law declaration included Choo as a subject for investigation.

Lee Jae Myung, the leader of the DPK, urged citizens to gather at the National Assembly and declared that Yoon "is no longer the president of South Korea". Lee began livestreaming on his YouTube channel around 22:50 as he traveled to the Assembly, telling 70,000 live viewers "There's no justification for declaring martial law. We cannot let the military rule the country". The Incheon branch of the DPK criticized the declaration as the beginning of an "era of Yoon dictatorship". Rebuilding Korea Party leader Cho Kuk called the declaration of martial law "illegal" and said it met conditions for the impeachment of Yoon and Defense Minister Kim. Lee Jun-seok, leader of the Reform Party, called for Yoon to be expelled from the PPP, while Gyeonggi Province governor Kim Dong-yeon called for Yoon's arrest. The Korean Confederation of Trade Unions, the largest trade union group in the country, called for a general strike to reverse the declaration of martial law and impeach the president.

Former President Moon Jae-in addressed the military as a former commander-in-chief in a Facebook post, urging them to respect the will of the people, not to act against the National Assembly, and to adhere strictly to constitutional principles. He called on the military to focus on its legitimate duties, safeguarding national security without compromising democratic institutions. A handful of conservative figures supported the decree, such as former prime minister Hwang Kyo-ahn, who called for the arrest of both Woo Won-shik and Han Dong-hoon. The mayor of Daegu, Hong Joon-pyo, did not explicitly take sides, but said he understood "Yoon's loyalty" while describing his actions as reckless and "making a scene".

=== National Assembly vote ===
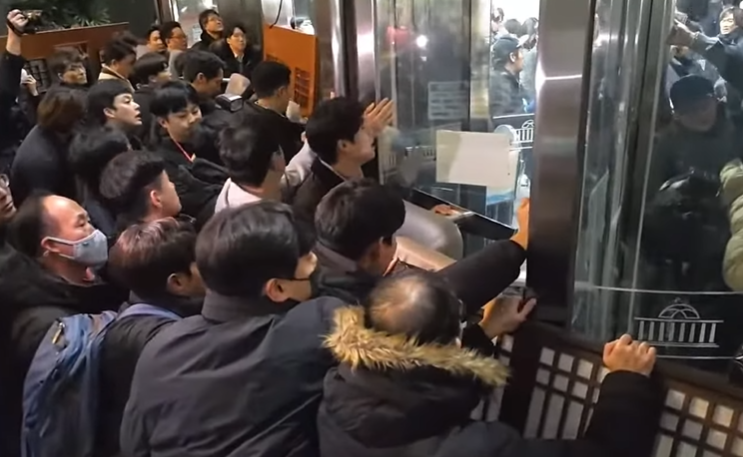
National Assembly staff and aides barricade the main assembly entrance with furniture against approaching troops

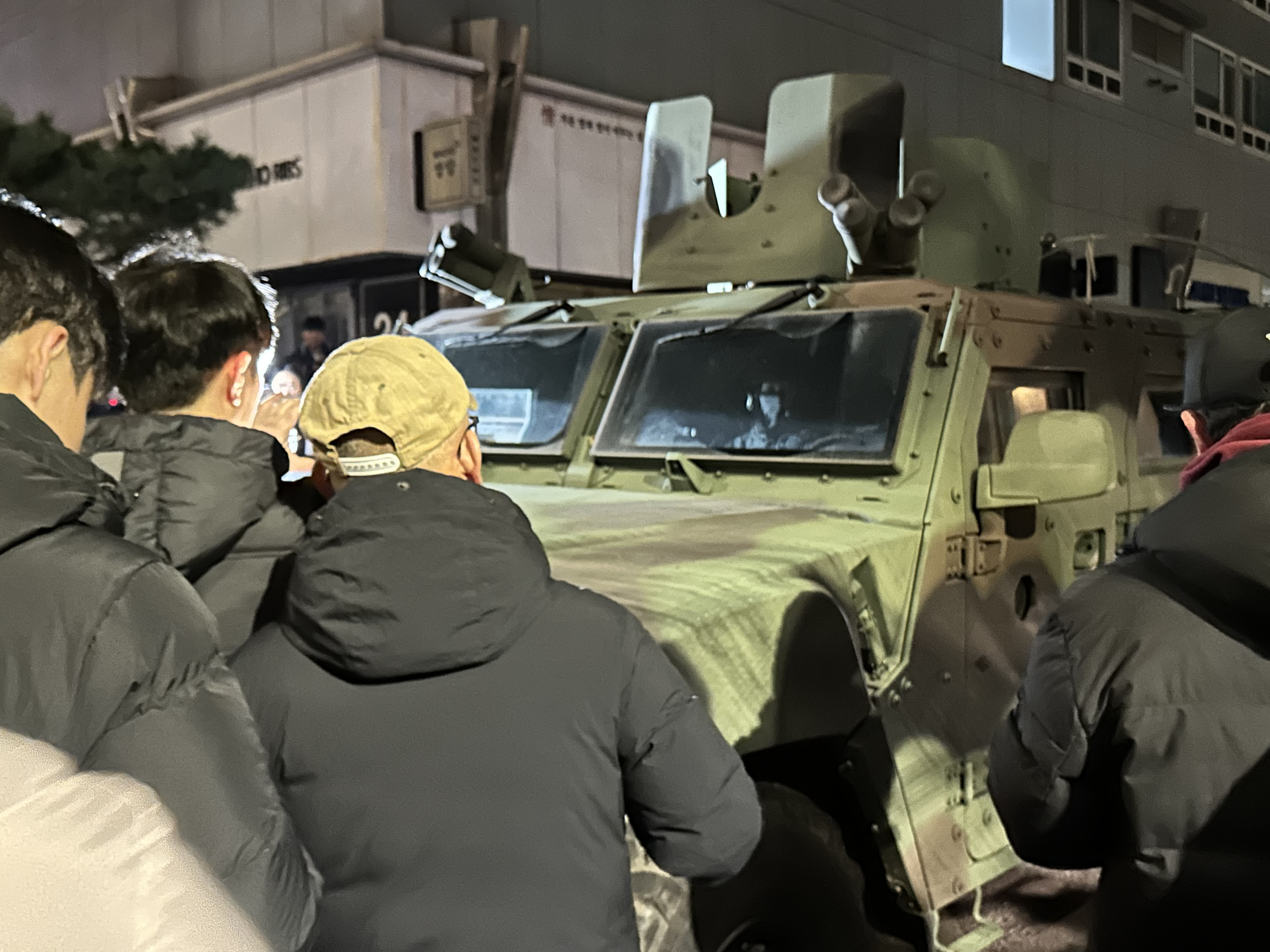
Civilians blocking military vehicles from entering Yeouido

Speaker Woo Won-shik announcing the National Assembly voted 190–0 to end martial law

National Assembly vote summary of lifting martial law
Yes
Not present

From 22:48, martial law forces initially requested permission from the Capital Defense Command several times to allow helicopters to fly over restricted airspace to seize the National Assembly. Approval was repeatedly rejected on the grounds that the purpose of the flights was unknown. Permission was only approved at 23:31. Twenty-four helicopter flights carried 240 troops to the National Assembly until 01:18 the next morning.

The Seoul Metropolitan Police Agency blocked all entrances to the National Assembly by 23:04 and prevented lawmakers from reaching the plenary session to overturn the martial law declaration. Lawmakers instead maneuvered around police barricades to enter the Assembly, with some assistance from civilians. At around 23:00, Lee Jae Myung livestreamed himself climbing over a fence to gain access, and Speaker Woo also climbed a fence to enter the Assembly premises. Lee Jun-seok, leader of the Reform Party, was seen confronting police officers for obstructing lawmakers, but recounted later that some police officers appeared not to know what to do.

At 23:50, UH-60P Black Hawk military helicopters approached the grounds, prompting lawmakers and aides to build furniture barricades inside. Around 23:57, the 707th SMG appeared in front of the National Assembly Proceeding Hall, attempting to enter the building, leading to scuffles with aides and legislative staff who tried to prevent their entry. DPK spokeswoman Ahn Gwi-ryeong tried to seize a rifle from a soldier before the soldier pointed it at her briefly, prompting her to berate the soldier, saying "Aren't you ashamed?", as the soldier walked away. The video of the incident was captured on a livestream by OhmyNews and viewed millions of times on Twitter. She later told BBC Korean Service that "I didn't think... I just knew we had to stop this".

At 00:45, around 300 military personnel entered the National Assembly building, broke windows and attempted to enter the main hall, where Speaker Woo was about to begin the plenary session to revoke the martial law decree. In response, staff sprayed them with fire extinguishers and successfully stopped their entry. Some soldiers attempted to enter through the fourth floor, but were stopped by employees. Soldiers broke the windows of several MPs' offices, while injuries occurred during confrontations inside the building. Ultimately, the soldiers were unable to access the main session hall, whose entrances were barricaded using furniture installed by staff. At least three helicopters also landed on the Assembly grounds while two others were seen hovering above. Armored military vehicles were seen on the streets, while the martial law command also ordered the eviction of the Presidential Office press corps from its building in Seoul.

The National Assembly commenced the emergency session at 00:48 on 4 December. At 01:02, with 190 of 300 lawmakers present, they voted unanimously to lift martial law. Those who voted included 172 opposition MPs and 18 members of a PPP faction supporting Han Dong-hoon. Following the vote, Speaker Woo Won-shik called for the military and police to leave the Assembly as "declaration of extraordinary martial law is now void" while reiterating that the president did not notify the National Assembly on implementing martial law as prescribed in the Constitution. Lee Jae Myung said that the DPK would remain in the Assembly until the president lifted martial law. Lee called for police and soldiers to return to their positions and not abide with Yoon's "illegal act". They were also joined by members of the PPP. The plenary session was only adjourned at 05:54 upon confirmation from the State Council that martial law had been withdrawn.

The Korea Times and opposition parties identified units of the security forces involved in the incursion at the Assembly as the 1st Airborne Special Forces Brigade of the Army Special Warfare Command and the Seoul Metropolitan Police Agency, with the National Police Agency believed to have been bypassed by the declaration. The National Police Agency declared a Level B Emergency. The Kyunghyang Shinmun published images of soldiers next to boxes of what appeared to be live bullets and ammunition at the Assembly. Protests against martial law were organized in Gwangju, where memories of the 1980 Gwangju Uprising and subsequent crackdown remain fresh.

On 5 December, an anonymous special forces soldier told the media that the soldiers sent to the National Assembly only learned of the martial law declaration from the news. Other soldiers have said they were kept in the dark to varying degrees; most were not even told their destination until en route, and were only given a specific mission after arrival. One said he felt betrayed by his superiors. Many were reluctant and deliberately slow in carrying out orders.

On 6 December, Lieutenant General Kwak Jong-geun, Chief of the Army Special Warfare Command, in an interview by DPK legislators Kim Byung-joo and Park Sun-won, revealed that the defense minister gave orders for troops to drag out the legislators, corroborating the earlier reports. Kwak said he prohibited giving live ammunition to individual soldiers as he witnessed "unjustified scenes" during the deployment, and added that "based on my judgment, dragging lawmakers out was clearly an illegal act"; he defied the orders, ordering the troops not to enter the plenary hall. Brigadier General Lee Sang-hyun, commander of the 1st Special Forces Brigade confirmed that they were deployed to the National Assembly, with deployment of two battalions, consisting of about 250 soldiers in total. He confirmed that orders were given to remove the lawmakers using means such as breaking down doors or cutting electricity, while confirming that Kwak gave orders not to give live ammunition. On a subsequent inquiry by the National Assembly on 10 December with a huge delegation of military officers summoned for questioning by legislators, Kwak said that the president personally called him to demand "break[ing] open the door, and drag the lawmakers out" and further added that he was made aware of plans for martial law on 1 December, two days before the announcement. Kwak said that the prosecutors in charge of investigating Yoon's martial law declaration were framing their questions in a way that held former Defense Minister Kim accountable, and shifting the blame away from Yoon.

Subsequent investigations revealed that Yoon ordered Commander Kwak Jong-geun and Capital Defense Commander Lee Jin-woo to break through the plenary chamber doors to drag the lawmakers out at 00:40 to 00:50 hours, which was too late as the lawmakers had already begun the session to end martial law. Yoon also called Police Commissioner General Cho Ji-ho several times and instructed him to arrest all the lawmakers trying to enter the National Assembly, saying "Bring them in. It's illegal. All the lawmakers are violating the proclamation. Arrest them." In the indictment of Kim Yong-hyun on 27 December by the special prosecution team, it was also revealed that Yoon told Commander Lee: "Break down the doors, even if it means shooting." When he was notified the lawmakers had begun the session to end martial law, Yoon ordered Special Warfare Commander Kwak to "break down the door with an axe and go in and get them all out". Defense Minister Kim also ordered: "Stop the number of National Assembly members so that it is less than 150. Bring the National Assembly members out." He also prioritized the arrests and detention of Lee Jae Myung, Woo Won-shik, and Han Dong-hoon from the National Assembly. Upon finding out about the National Assembly vote being passed, Yoon denied it was legitimate, and told Commander Lee, "It's not even confirmed that 190 people came in. Even if martial law was lifted, I just have to declare martial law two or three more times, so keep going."

The group messenger chatroom of the counter-intelligence arrest team, made public by the prosecution, contained the following message: "Cancel all existing detention quotas. All teams should first arrest Woo Won-sik, Lee Jae Myung, and Han Dong-hoon, whichever team you see, and then move them to the Subangsa detention facility." There was also a message saying, "Secure new recruits through the operational unit on site, then take them over and detain them at the Subangsa. Use ropes and handcuffs." Confrontations took place at the complex's main gate between security forces and civilians. Crowds gathered as soon as martial law was declared, chanting slogans such as "lift martial law", "take down the dictatorship", "no violence" and "impeach Yoon".

CCTV footage released in February 2025 showed that in addition to troops smashing windows on the second floor of the National Assembly's main building on the night of martial law, a few troops were caught on camera opening a switchboard on the basement floor at 01:06 (five minutes after the National Assembly voted to rescind martial law), turning off both the main power and the backup power for a portion of the building. Half of the first basement floor of the building went dark, with the blackout lasting for 5 minutes and 48 seconds. The seven soldiers who cut off the power belonged to the 707th Special Mission Group, the same elite 16-person unit that entered the National Assembly's main chamber.

== Aftermath ==
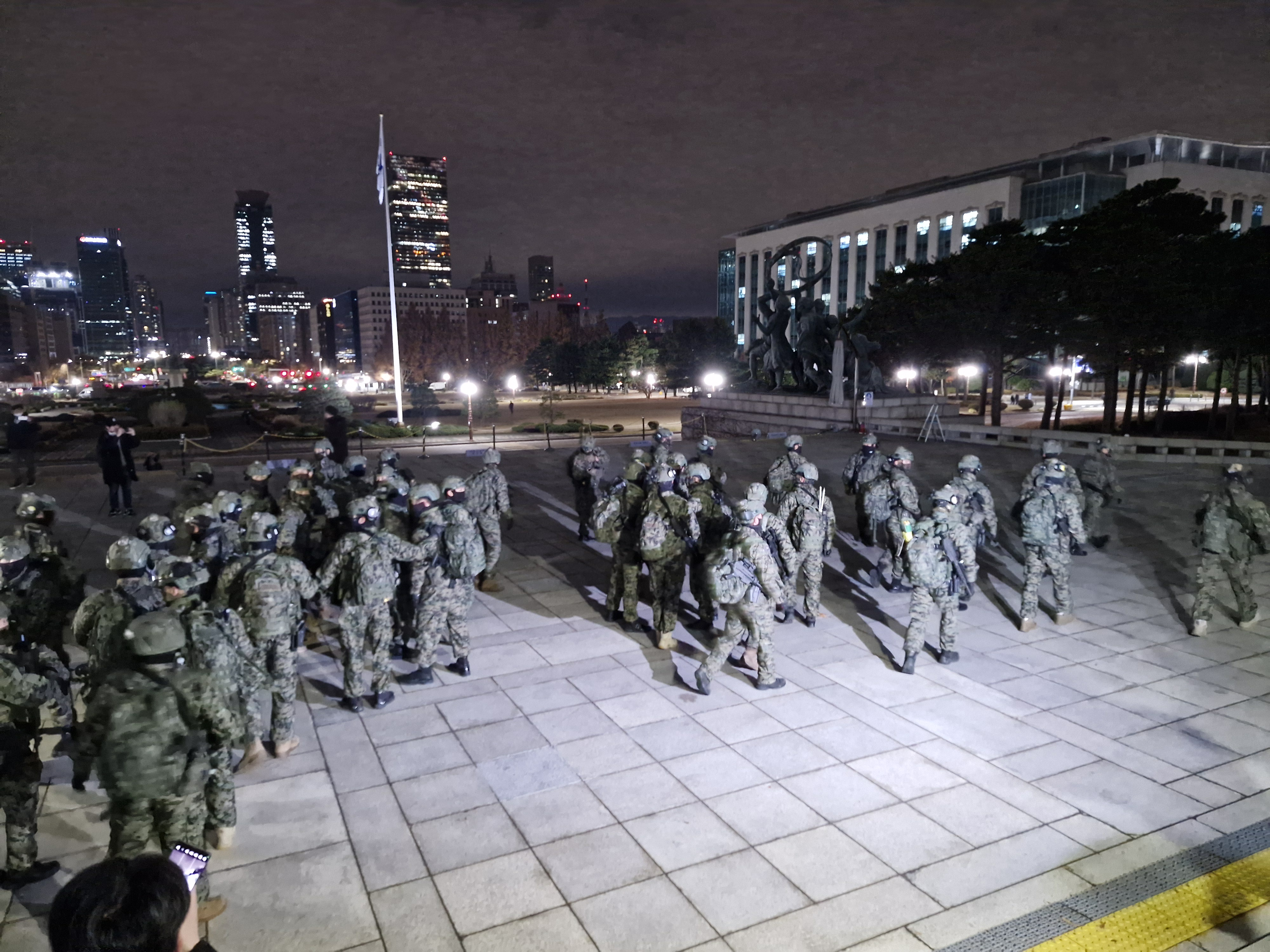
Troops preparing to leave the National Assembly after the vote to end martial law

After the vote, soldiers began withdrawing; the Speaker's office later said that they had left altogether by 01:18. Others began pushing back the crowd of protesters who gathered there, which numbered around 2,000. Several soldiers bowed in apology to the public over the incursion, while others consoled civilians who had engaged in confrontations. Protesters began calling for Yoon's arrest and impeachment. Lee Jae Myung said the declaration of martial law was done without cabinet approval, and that members of the security forces who continued to follow Yoon's martial law orders were committing "an illegal act". The Defense Ministry said that martial law would remain in effect until ended by the president.

Yoon held a meeting inside the Joint Chiefs of Staff's command and control room with Defense Minister Kim Yong-hyun, Martial Law Commander Park An-su, 2nd Deputy Director of the National Security Office In Sung-hwan, Defense Secretary Choi Byung-ok, and Military Advisor to the Ministry of National Defense Kim Chul-jin. Yoon asked Kim Yong-hyun the amount of troops he deployed to the National Assembly. He responded: "about 500." Yoon replied: "I told you it's not enough. You should have sent 1,000. What are we going to do now?" While searching for another method, Yoon looked for a copy of South Korea's National Assembly Act. Yoon ultimately decided to lift the martial law following this meeting, despite there being no discussion about lifting martial law at that meeting.

After martial law was lifted, the president's office told foreign media 38 hours after refusing all interviews with South Korean media that "emergency martial law was strictly enforced within the framework of the constitution and took place late at night to minimize damage to the national economy and citizens' daily lives". DPK leader Park Chan-dae then told CNN that Yoon "cannot avoid the charge of treason" and that he "must step down immediately". To prevent future disruptions, on 3 July 2025, the National Assembly voted to amend the country's guidelines on martial law by barring security forces from obstructing the work of MPs and entering the National Assembly Building without approval from the Speaker.

=== Lifting of martial law ===
During a televised briefing at 04:27, Yoon announced that he would lift martial law as soon as a quorum could be obtained for a cabinet meeting, and that he had withdrawn military personnel from the National Assembly. At approximately 04:30, the cabinet approved the motion to lift martial law. The Martial Law Command was also disbanded. The military said it had not observed unusual activity in North Korea while martial law was in place.

Following the lifting of martial law, the DPK held an emergency meeting at the Assembly, announcing that they would commence impeachment proceedings if Yoon did not step down. In a resolution, it said "Yoon's declaration of martial law is a clear violation of the Constitution", adding that it was "a serious act of rebellion and a perfect reason for impeachment". Protests continued to be held in the Assembly and in Gwanghwamun Square, as well as outside the Presidential Residence. Candlelight rallies and related activities were held in cities across South Korea. Smaller rallies were held in support of Yoon.

=== Protests against Yoon Suk Yeol ===
Protests against Yoon Suk Yeol
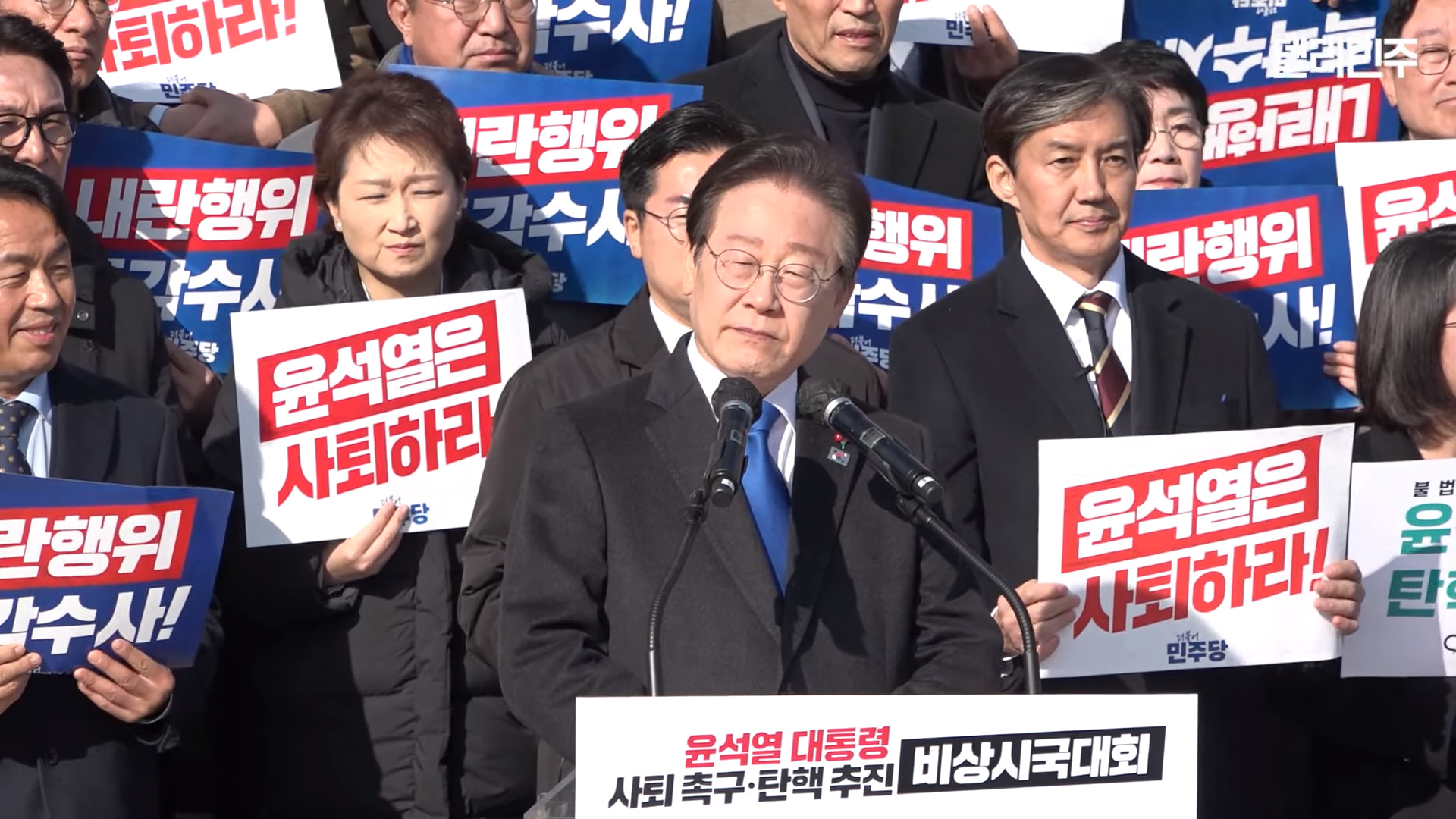
- Lee Jae Myung at the emergency rally held at the National Assembly on 4 December, with Cho Kuk to his left
- Date: 3 December 2024 – 4 April 2025
- Location: South Korea
- Caused by: Declaration of martial law by President Yoon Suk Yeol
- Goals: Resignation or impeachment of Yoon Suk Yeol
- Status: Protests are successful, Yoon Suk Yeol is impeached by the National Assembly, and removed from office by the Constitutional Court of Korea, protests ended

Number
Protesters: 1,000,000 (maximum)	Counter-protesters: 30,000 (maximum)
- 150,000 police deployed (maximum)

Inspector General of the Ministry of Justice Ryu Hyuk resigned in protest shortly after attending a meeting convened on martial law by Justice Minister Park Sung-jae. Shortly after Yoon lifted martial law, the opposition began to consider his impeachment. Some South Korean analysts described the episode as a self-coup attempt to seize power. In the early hours of 4 December, dozens of Yoon's aides resigned en masse following the martial law declaration and recantation. That same day, the Supreme Court announced it would investigate whether the declaration was illegal, given that he had failed to abide by mandatory provisions such as notifying both the cabinet and the legislature beforehand. On 6 December, the Constitutional Court also opened an investigation into the legality of Yoon's martial law declaration.

The leadership of the PPP discussed expelling Yoon from the party during a meeting. Han Dong-hoon urged Yoon to immediately fire Defense Minister Kim for proposing the idea. He later asked Yoon to leave the PPP through presidential officials and the prime minister. The DPK confirmed they would initiate impeachment proceedings against Yoon, Kim, and Interior Minister Lee Sang-min on 5 December if Yoon did not resign. Kim apologized and took responsibility for the soldiers' actions. He offered his resignation, which was accepted by Yoon. In a separate interview, Kim said that the deployment of soldiers to the National Election Commission was aimed at assessing the "necessity of an investigation into alleged election fraud". In response, the commission denounced the incursion as a violation of the Constitution and pledged to take legal action. At noon on 4 December, Prime Minister Han Duck-soo held a meeting with party leaders and Yoon's remaining cabinet members to discuss the fallout of the martial law declaration. He subsequently apologized and took full responsibility for what had happened.

Later on 4 December, all of the major newspapers in South Korea and the National Union of Media Workers unanimously condemned Yoon and called for his arrest, saying the martial law was illegal and an attempted repeat of the brutal coups of the 1980s. At the same time, multiple South Korean celebrities also heavily condemned Yoon. The Catholic Bishops' Conference of Korea, the Korean Methodist Church, the National Council of Churches in Korea, and the Korean Church Human Rights Center criticized the declaration of martial law, while the national association of Won Buddhist clerics called for Yoon's impeachment.

A joint declaration was signed by 370 professors and researchers at Korea University calling for Yoon's impeachment. The emergency medical professors of Seoul National University and Seoul National University Hospital also criticized martial law and its attempt to halt the ongoing doctors' strike and supported Yoon's impeachment. In particular, the term "cheodan" (처단) in Article 5 of the decree on martial law has sparked strong reactions from both medical professionals and the general public in Korea. Although it was translated as "punishment", its real-world usage aligns more closely with "execution", fueling significant controversy. The chair of the Chungam High School Foundation called Yoon and Kim Yong-hyun "shameful graduates". The school suspended its uniform policy for students amid concerns over harassment, adding that some of its school bus drivers had been harassed by passersby and that it had received hundreds of protest calls. Its student council issued a statement supporting Yoon's impeachment. Five MPs of the PPP from Han Dong-hoon's faction expressed support for amending the constitution to move Yoon's end of term from 2027 to 2026. Some PPP legislators called for amendments shifting power from the president to the prime minister and allowing for power-sharing between parties under a coalition government.

On 5 December, Kim Min-seok, who had previously warned of a possible declaration of martial law in August, said that he was "100 percent certain" that Yoon would try and declare martial law again, attributing Yoon's motivations as to protect himself and his wife from ongoing investigations. He also attributed the failure of 3 December declaration to popular resistance and the incompetence of Defense Minister Kim Yong-hyun. The Center for Military Human Rights Korea also warned of such a possibility, citing the Army restricting leave for some officers and implementing stringent regulations effective until 8 December, which coincided with the period that proposals to impeach Yoon are being discussed in the National Assembly. On 6 December, the Defense Ministry and the Joint Chiefs of Staff denied the allegations and said that they would not comply with a second declaration of martial law, while the DPK said all 170 of its lawmakers will remain on emergency standby within the National Assembly premises to vote down future declarations of martial law. The National Assembly Secretariat barred officials from the Defense Ministry, police and the NIS from entering its buildings "for the time being".

On the afternoon of 6 December, rumors that Yoon would visit the Assembly for a meeting with the PPP prompted opposition lawmakers and staff to gather at the building's main rotunda to block his entry. Additional entry restrictions were imposed on other visitors, and the complex's day care center was advised to send children home early. The Presidential Office later said that Yoon had no plans to visit the legislature. On 3 January 2025, the city government of Gwangju raised the state flag of Virginia, which contains the inscription Sic semper tyrannis, in front of the city hall, with mayor Kang Ki-jung denouncing Yoon for abuse of power. The mayor claimed to have received the flag from the state's governor alongside a letter of appreciation.

=== Impeachment, arrest, and indictment ===
In the Judiciary of South Korea, matters of constitutional importance, such as impeachment trials, fall under the jurisdiction of the Constitutional Court. The National Assembly takes role of plaintiff in an impeachment trial. Other ordinary matters, such as criminal trial, fall under the jurisdiction of ordinary courts, represented by the Supreme Court. In criminal processes, the Supreme Prosecutors' Office takes the role of prosecutor, while the National Police Agency and the Corruption Investigation Office investigate the crime.

==== Impeachment by National Assembly ====
On 4 December, 190 (Note: Although The Korea Times says "The motion was [by] the DPK, Rebuilding Korea Party (RKP), New Reform Party, Progressive Party, Basic Income Party and Social Democratic Party. All 191 lawmakers from the [parties...]", Financial Times says "190 lawmakers from six opposition parties", and the actual parties add to 190 members.) legislators across six opposition parties submitted a motion for impeachment, intending to discuss the bill the following day; the DPK later planned a vote on 7 December. At a meeting with Prime Minister Han Duck-soo and PPP party leader Han Dong-hoon, Yoon said that he would not resign, there was "no wrongdoing" in his declaration, it was a "warning" to the opposition, and it was to prevent the DPK's "reckless impeachment actions". Yoon also defended plans to arrest Han Dong-hoon for going to the National Assembly. On 5 December, the PPP announced they would oppose impeachment, following an emergency meeting the previous evening. However, at an emergency meeting on 6 December, Han Dong-hoon said it was necessary to "promptly suspend [Yoon] from his duties to protect the Republic of Korea", citing Yoon's orders to arrest and detain key politicians during martial law, including Han himself. That same day, Cho Kyoung-tae voiced his support for Yoon's impeachment, becoming the first MP from the PPP to do so.

On 14 December, the National Assembly voted to impeach Yoon, with 204 lawmakers, including 12 from the PPP, supporting impeachment. Yoon's presidential powers were suspended immediately upon the delivery of the impeachment resolution to the Presidential Office. Prime Minister Han Duck-soo stepped in as acting president, and the impeachment motion proceeded to the Constitutional Court. On 27 December, 192 MPs in the National Assembly voted to impeach Han Duck-soo for blocking investigations against Yoon and his wife, colluding with Yoon on martial law and blocking the appointment of justices to fill vacancies in the Constitutional Court. Despite being boycotted by the PPP, Han's impeachment was made possible with a simple majority because Han was Prime Minister rather than the elected president. This made Deputy Prime Minister and Finance Minister Choi Sang-mok the new acting president. On 21 March 2025, the DPK and four other opposition parties submitted a motion in the National Assembly to impeach Choi, citing charges that included abetting Yoon's martial law declaration. On 24 March 2025, the Constitutional Court overturned Han's impeachment, reinstating him as acting president. On 1 May, Choi resigned minutes before the National Assembly was set to vote on his impeachment, prompting the suspension of the proceedings.

==== Initial legal investigations ====
The DPK sought Defense Minister Kim Yong-hyun's impeachment for proposing martial law to Yoon, and intended to file a criminal complaint against him. The party's chief spokesperson, Jo Seoung-lae, issued a statement: "The DPK will punish the unconstitutional and illegal emergency martial law of the Yoon administration ... We urge law enforcement agencies to immediately launch an investigation into the treason case that the entire nation is now aware of and bring the perpetrators to justice." On 5 December, the police investigated Yoon and other key officials for alleged insurrection in response to a case filed by minor opposition parties and 59 activists accusing them of treason. Kim Yong-hyun resigned the same day and issued an apology. He said "as defense minister, I feel deeply responsible and sorry for causing concern and confusion in regard to the martial law. All members of the armed forces involved in the implementation of the emergency martial law only did their duty at my direction. I take full responsibility for it." The DPK planned to appoint a permanent special counsel to investigate Yoon for treason and considered filing charges against PPP Floor Leader Cho Kyung-ho, who urged PPP lawmakers to assemble at the party's headquarters rather than the Assembly.

On 8 December, Kim Yong-hyun was arrested on suspicion of committing insurrection by advising Yoon to declare martial law and sending troops into the National Assembly to seize the legislature. The Ministry of Justice barred Kim from leaving the country following rumors that he booked a flight to flee overseas to avoid prosecution. He could potentially be sentenced to life in prison, or the death penalty if found guilty. On 9 December, the Ministry of Justice issued an overseas travel ban against Yoon following an investigation into allegations of rebellion linked to his brief imposition of martial law, marking the first instance of a sitting president facing such restrictions. That same day, Lee Jae Myung issued a statement exonerating lower-ranking soldiers who participated in the martial law exercises and expressed gratitude for their restraint, saying that they had been "exploited" by their commanders. An overseas travel ban was placed on KNP Commissioner Cho Ji-ho, Seoul Metropolitan Police Agency Chief Kim Bong-sik and Mok Hyun-tae, head of the National Assembly Police Guards, as part of the martial law investigation.

On 10 December, the National Assembly passed a bill creating a permanent special counsel to investigate Yoon on charges of treason related to his martial law declaration. The motion passed with 210 MPs, including 23 PPP members, in favor after the PPP allowed its members to vote individually. That same day, Army Maj. Gen. Moon Sang-ho, chief of the Defense Intelligence Command, was suspended over his role in the incursion into the National Election Commission's office in Gwacheon. On 11 December, KNP Commissioner Cho Ji-ho and Seoul Metropolitan Police Chief Kim Bong-sik were arrested without a warrant on charges of insurrection. On 12 December, Park An-su was suspended as Army Chief of Staff.

==== Arrest warrant and political standoff ====
Yoon Suk Yeol was summoned three times by the Corruption Investigation Office for High-ranking Officials (CIO) for questioning on 18 December 25 December, and 29 December over his declaration of martial law. He ignored all three summonses. In response, on 30 December, the CIO filed an arrest warrant for Yoon at the Seoul Western District Court. On 31 December, the court issued the warrant, which was valid until 6 January 2025. After the impeachment, Yoon sequestered himself in the presidential residence. On 1 January, he released a statement to his supporters pledging to "fight alongside you to the very end to protect this nation". On 3 January, authorities tried to serve the warrant at the presidential residence but halted the attempt after being physically blocked by the Presidential Security Service. After the warrant expired on 6 January, the Seoul Western District Court extended the warrant's validity for one day.

==== Police raids ====
On 10 December, police raided the Presidential Office, with investigators presenting a search warrant that specified Yoon as the suspect. The Presidential Security Service refused to cooperate, resulting in a "very limited" number of documents and materials being submitted by Yoon's office. Raids were also conducted on the Defense Counterintelligence Command, the Army Special Warfare Command, the National Police Agency, the Seoul Metropolitan Police Agency, and the National Assembly Security Service.

On 12 December, police raided the Joint Chiefs of Staff headquarters adjacent to the presidential compound, as well as the Capital Defense Command headquarters. On 13 December, police raided the Gyeonggi Nambu Provincial Police headquarters to investigate the unit's role during martial law. Gyeonggi Nambu Provincial Police had dispatched police forces to the NEC after the martial law declaration. On 17 December, a joint investigation team launched a raid on the offices of the Presidential Security Service. The head of the Presidential Security Service, Park Jong-jun, resigned on 10 January 2025. He was then summoned to the National Investigation Headquarters of the National Police Agency for questioning on charges of obstruction of official duties by preventing the arrest of Yoon. Police raided a presidential safehouse in Samcheong-dong believed to have hosted preparatory meetings for martial law and unsuccessfully tried to enter the Presidential Security Service.

==== Suicide attempt of Kim Yong-hyun ====
On 10 December, at 23:52 KST, the former Defense Minister Kim Yong-hyun attempted suicide, using his clothing to try and hang himself in the bathroom of the detention facility where he was held in custody. Shin Yong-hae, the head of the Ministry of Justice's Correctional Service, said at a National Assembly plenary session: "A control room worker discovered Kim Yong-hyun attempting suicide by using string connecting his underwear and underwear pants in the bathroom of the waiting area before a warrant against him was to be issued. ... He gave up and came out when we immediately went in and opened the door. He is currently being housed in a protection facility and I have received reports that he is in good health." Kim was indicted on insurrection charges on 27 December.

== Trials ==
=== Impeachment trial ===
On 14 January 2025, South Korea's constitutional court held the first hearing to determine if Yoon will be formally removed from office. The hearing was adjourned as it could not proceed without Yoon's presence. On the morning of 15 January, Yoon was arrested at his residence where he had been since the impeachment. Police used wire-cutters and ladders to enter Yoon's residence in order to bypass barricades and barbed wire fortifications. After his arrest Yoon was brought to the Corruption Investigation Office (CIO), where he agreed to an interrogation. Yoon is the country's first sitting president to be arrested. On 18 January, supporters of Yoon clashed with police outside the Seoul Western District Court before storming the courthouse after his detention was extended. On 21 January, Yoon attended the impeachment trial for the first time, during which he denied ordering soldiers to interfere with the proceedings of the National Assembly against the martial law declaration.

On 23 January, the CIO recommended that Yoon be charged with "leading an insurrection and abuse of power". On the same day, Yoon appeared at the impeachment trial again, with former Defense Minister Kim Yong-hyun present as a witness. Kim denied allegations that Yoon had ordered the military to storm the National Assembly to prevent lawmakers from convening and passing a resolution nullifying martial law. However, he admitted to recommending declaring martial law to Yoon and to writing a note to Finance Minister Choi Sang-mok, instructing the establishment of an emergency legislative body during martial law. Alongside Yoon, Kim was also accused of ordering lawmakers to be dragged out of the parliament. Kim responded: "The situation was very chaotic, I thought someone might get crushed to death. So I said to pull them out for now to reduce the risk of serious harm. That's what I meant."

Yoon was indicted on the insurrection charges on 26 January. His case was assigned by the Seoul Central District Court to its criminal collegiate division 25, which also handled martial law-related criminal charges against Kim Yong-hyun, Cho Ji-ho, and Kim Bong-sik. On 20 February, Yoon's criminal trial began, making him the first incumbent president of South Korea to stand trial in a criminal case. On 25 February, the last day of the impeachment trial, Yoon issued an apology on the last day of the impeachment trial, and continued to defend his actions.

=== Verdict ===
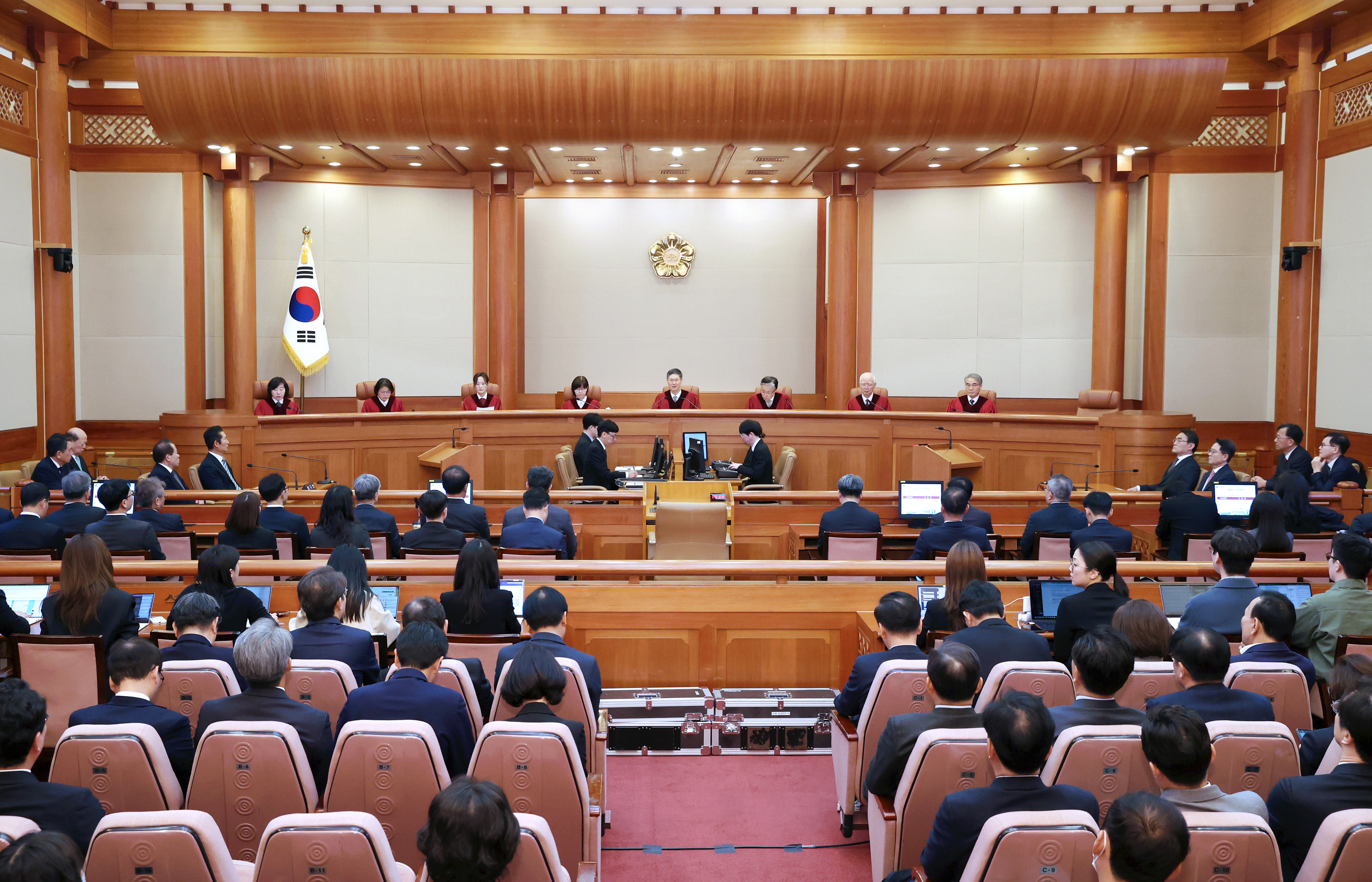
Constitutional Court Acting Chief Justice Moon Hyung-bae reads the verdict upholding Yoon's impeachment and removal from office, 4 April 2025.

On 4 April, the Constitutional Court convened to announce its impeachment verdict. In a televised verdict read by acting Chief Justice Moon Hyung-bae, the judges unanimously decided in an 8–0 decision to remove Yoon from office, citing his betrayal of the public trust and serious violations of the law which failed to protect the Constitution. The Court removed Yoon from office on the basis of the following violations during martial law on 3–4 December:

- Missing substantive requirements for the declaration of emergency martial law

Political gridlock or suspicions of election fraud should have been resolved through political, institutional and judicial means. Yoon claimed that the declaration was intended as a "warning" or an "appeal to the public", but the Martial Law Act does not authorize declarations of martial law on those bases.

- Violation of procedural requirements set forth in the Constitution and the Martial Law Act for declaring emergency martial law

Yoon did not explain the specific details of the martial law to the martial law commander or other members, nor did he give the other members of the Cabinet the opportunity to state their opinions. Yoon declared martial law without obtaining the signatures of prime minister Han and relevant Cabinet members, failed to publicly announce when the martial law would be implemented, in which areas of the country martial law was being implemented, and who the martial law commander would be. Yoon also failed to notify the National Assembly of martial law implementation without delay.

- Interference with the National Assembly's authority to overturn martial law

Yoon deployed the military and police to block the Assembly members from entering the National Assembly and ordered them dragged out. These commands violated the constitutional provision that grants the Assembly the right to demand the lifting of martial law, lawmakers' rights to deliberate and vote, and their immunity from arrest.

- Violation of citizens' freedom to actively support any political party

Yoon directly requested NIS first deputy director Hong Jang-won to track the locations of his political opponents for potential arrests.

- Infringement on military neutrality in civil affairs and the commander-in-chief's duties under the Constitution

Deploying military troops for political purposes, to block the functions and exercise of power by the National Assembly, led soldiers into direct conflict with civilians.

- Infringement on Constitutional guarantees of the political party system, representative democracy and separated powers

The martial law decree prohibited the activities of the National Assembly, regional assemblies and political parties.

- Violation of basic political rights, especially the rights to collective action and freedom of occupation

Yoon had violating provisions of the Constitution and Martial Law Act that stipulate the requirements for restricting basic rights under martial law and need for warrants.

- Unauthorized search and seizure without a warrant at the National Election Commission and infringement of its independence

Yoon's order to the defense minister Kim to mobilize troops to inspect the National Election Commission's computer systems, raid the NEC, confiscate of on-duty NEC staff members' phones, and film NEC computer systems infringed the independence of the NEC. Search and seizure at the NEC without a warrant violated the warrant requirement. The NEC had already taken measures to prevent election fraud before the last National Assembly election, contrary to Yoon's claims.

- Violation of judicial independence

Tracking the locations of former chief justice Kim Myeong-su and former justices of the Supreme Court such as ex-justice Kwon Soon-il (former chair of the NEC) for potential arrest created pressure on current judges, suggesting they could be subject to arrest by the executive branch at any time.

Upon the verdict's delivery at 11:22 a.m. KST, Yoon ceased to be president of South Korea, triggering a presidential election due to take place within 60 days. This paved the way for Yoon to be charged with other crimes in addition to insurrection as he no longer had presidential immunity.

=== Insurrection trial ===
Yoon's trial on charges of insurrection began on 14 April. He attended the fifth hearing of the trial on 26 May, and he declined to respond to questions from the press. On 6 July 2025, South Korean prosecutors filed a request to detain Yoon a day after he appeared before them for questioning over his declaration of martial law the previous year. He would then once again be arrested on 10 July 2025 and indicted for abuse of power on 19 July. On 18 July 2025, the Seoul District Court denied Yoon's request to be released from prison, with the additional indictment then requiring for him to remain in prison for up to six months.

If found guilty, Yoon potentially faced the death penalty or life imprisonment, although there has been a moratorium on executions in South Korea since 1997. On 13 January 2026, the prosecution sought the death penalty for Yoon, stating that his actions constituted an "unprecedented and grave act of constitutional destruction" and that there were no mitigating circumstances. On 19 February 2026, the court ruled that Yoon had orchestrated an insurrection and engaged in actions aimed at undermining the nation's constitutional system, sentencing him to life imprisonment.

==== Special counsel investigation ====
On 4 June 2025, Lee Jae Myung of the Democratic Party took office as president after winning the 2025 presidential election. On 5 June, the DPK-controlled National Assembly passed a bill to set up a special counsel investigation into Yoon's martial law, after being vetoed multiple times by the previous acting presidents. The bill mandated a permanent special counsel investigation against Yoon, and would look into 11 different charges tied to his martial law attempt, including insurrection and mutiny. President Lee's government promulgated and enacted the bills on 10 June.

Cho Eun-suk, former chief of the Seoul High Prosecutors Office and former acting chief of the Board of Audit and Inspection, was appointed as the special counsel by President Lee. The investigation team was made up of 60 prosecutors. This meant that the concurrent probes by the police, prosecutors and CIO would be merged into the special counsel investigation. The ongoing criminal cases against Yoon were transferred to the special prosecutor on 19 June.

Among the first acts of the special counsel investigation was to extend Kim Yong-hyun's detention by indicting him with additional charges of obstruction of justice and abetting the destruction of evidence just as he was set to be released. Military prosecutors filed new charges against Yeo In-hyung and Moon Sang-ho, with further investigations into Roh Sang-won. The special counsel team also began investigating allegations that two Defense Intelligence Command officers were caught by Mongolia's intelligence agency trying to contact the North Korean Embassy in Mongolia, ten days before the imposition of martial law, as a key clue pointing to an attempt to bait North Korea into a skirmish.

== Legal proceedings, criminal charges and sentences ==
On 15 December 2025, former Commander of the Defense Intelligence Command Roh Sang-won was found guilty of violating the Personal Information Protection Act by requesting and receiving personal details such as rank, origin, and commission year of 46 Intelligence Command personnel from Moon Sang-ho, then commander of the Information Command, to plan a non-official investigative body to probe alleged election fraud between September and December 2024. Roh was sentenced to 2 years in prison. He was ordered to pay 24.9 million won after he was found guilty of receiving 20,000,000 Korean won in cash and 6,000,000 Korean won worth of department store gift certificates from former head of the Central News Unit at the Information Command Kim Bong-gyu, and former commander of the 2nd Armored Brigade Koo Sam-hoe, under the pretext of helping their promotions between August and October 2024. On 18 December, the Constitutional Court upheld the National Assembly's impeachment of Police Commissioner Cho Ji-ho and removed him from office by a unanimous 9–0 decision, on grounds of grave violation of the principles of representative democracy and separation of powers, by following illegal orders by Yoon to block lawmakers from entering the National Assembly and deploying police officers to the National Election Commission headquarters which interfered with the commission's duties and its exercise of authority.

On 16 January 2026, Yoon Suk Yeol was found guilty on charges of infringement of ministers' constitutional right to deliberate on the imposition of martial law, obstruction of arrest, abuse of power, falsification and unlawful destruction of official documents relating to the martial law declaration, and masterminding an insurrection, and was sentenced to life in prison plus 12 years. On 21 January, former Prime Minister Han Duck-soo was convicted of falsifying documents, destroying presidential records, committing perjury during Yoon's impeachment proceedings, and fabricating the appearance of a legitimate cabinet meeting to approve an unconstitutional decree, and was sentenced to 23 years in prison. The sentence was reduced to 15 years imprisonment on appeal while upholding the guilty verdict on 7 May 2026. On 12 February, former Interior and Safety Minister Lee Sang-min was convicted of ordering to cut electricity and water to media outlets critical of Yoon's policies, and falsely testifying during Yoon's impeachment trial that he had never relayed these orders, and sentenced to 9 years in prison. He was found not guilty on abuse of power charges.

On 19 February 2026, the main insurrection trial concluded. Former Defense Minister Kim Yong-hyun was found guilty of participating and planning the insurrection, destruction of evidence, and obstruction of official duties by deception, and was sentenced to 30 years in prison. Former Commissioner General of the Korea National Police Agency, Cho Ji-ho and former Seoul Metropolitan Police Agency chief Kim Bong-sik were found guilty of playing key roles in the insurrection by deploying police units to the National Assembly, and were sentenced to 12 years and 10 years in prison, respectively. Former Commander of the Defense Intelligence Command Noh Sang-won was found guilty of playing a key role in the insurrection, and was sentenced to 18 years in prison. Seoul Metropolitan Police Agency National Assembly Security Unit Commander Mok Hyun-tae was found guilty of playing a key role in the insurrection and was sentenced to 3 years in prison. Former Commander of the Third Field Army Command's Military Police Unit Kim Yong-gun and former director of investigation planning and coordination at the Korean National Police Agency Yoon Seung-young were acquitted after being found not guilty of participating in insurrection. Former NIS Director Cho Tae-yong was found guilty of perjury and destruction of evidence, was sentenced to 18 months in prison.

== Opinion polling ==
Opinion polling carried out by Realmeter on 4 December found that 73.4% of respondents supported Yoon's impeachment while 24% opposed it, and 70% believed that Yoon's actions constituted treason while 25% believed otherwise. A poll by Gallup conducted from 3 to 5 December found that Yoon's approval rating had fallen by six percentage points to 13% since the martial law declaration, while the PPP's approval rating had fallen by five percentage points to 27%. The DPK's approval rating had increased by four percentage points to 37%.

A Realmeter poll, released on 12 December, found 74.8% of respondents supported either Yoon's immediate resignation or impeachment, while 16.2% supported the PPP's proposal of Yoon's orderly resignation. 26.2% of respondents experienced trauma caused by the martial law declaration and recovered, and 40.0% continued to experience trauma. A Gallup poll released on 13 December found that Yoon's approval rating had fallen further to 11%, with 49% of respondents citing his declaration of martial law as a reason to assess him negatively. 75% of respondents supported Yoon's impeachment, while 21% opposed. The PPP's approval rating had fallen by three percentage points to 24%, while the DPK's approval rating had increased by three percentage points to 40%. The poll found Speaker Woo Won-shik emerging as the most trusted politician in South Korea for his actions during martial law and the subsequent impeachment, with a rating of 56%.

On 31 December, a poll conducted by The Korea Times and Hankook Research found 98% of DPK supporters believed that Yoon committed treason in declaring martial law, while 81% of PPP supporters believed otherwise, with only 12% agreeing. 56% of respondents were in favor of amending the constitutional provisions on presidential power, while 39% were opposed. 45% wanted constitutional reforms to address the shortcomings of the single, five-year term system, while 35% wanted to limit presidential powers to ensure better checks and balances, of which 64% specifically cited the presidential veto power. Another 17% wanted to overhaul the presidential election system.

=== Impact on South Korean military personnel ===
Concerns have been raised about morale and combat readiness in the Republic of Korea Armed Forces, following reported distrust in their leaders by rank-and-file troops after being sent to execute orders relating to the martial law declaration, and suspensions of senior military officials implicated or under investigation for their roles in the martial law declaration, potentially leading to leadership vacuums and low morale. On 18 December, the Ministry of National Defense found "at least several dozen soldiers" were at high risk of developing post-traumatic stress disorder (PTSD) and required special care, after conducting psychological evaluations on all personnel dispatched during the martial law incident. The Ministry also reported that many were likely reluctant to seek counseling due to fear of being identified for their roles in the martial law operations. In response, the ministry introduced a civilian psychological counseling program to ensure anonymous support for affected troops. A report by JTBC on 27 February 2025 found that the ministry deemed 71 soldiers as in need of treatment for mental health issues following a psychological evaluation, with two of them in a dangerous category.

== Reception and analysis ==
The students and staff of Chungam High School, Yoon Suk Yeol's alma mater, received public backlash by citizens over the martial law declaration and the Chungam Faction. In return, the school announced that students were not mandated to wear their uniforms to school until graduation in an attempt to protect them from harassment. They also confirmed they had no association with both the declaration and the faction. Chungam High School Foundation Chairwoman Yoon Myung-hwa called Yoon Suk Yeol and Kim Yong-hyun "shameful graduates" in a social media post, and said in another post: "The school's office is flooded with complaint calls all day, and even school bus drivers report being harassed by citizens passing by. There's even a petition to change the school's name. The school's reputation and the country's honor are tarnished. What kind of mental anguish must our students be enduring?" Leif-Eric Easley, a professor of international studies at Ewha Womans University in Seoul, compared it to the January 6 United States Capitol attack and the 8 January Brasília attacks, saying the effects of the declaration of martial law on South Korean politics and its reputation would be far worse than what happened in the United States.

Students at Myungil Girls' High School, Kim Keon-hee's alma mater, put up posters decrying Kim in response to the martial law order. Youngshik Bong, an adviser to the Ministry of Unification and visiting professor at Yonsei University, said that declaring martial law should be reserved for the most serious situations, such as war. He added that this will backfire on the president as "his impeachment is really in the cards now". Park Sung-min, a political consultant in Seoul, said "I don't know what his end goal was here, because I think this was political suicide ... It seems clear that President Yoon is now more likely to step down in the middle of his term rather than seeing his term through to completion". Shim Young-sub, an adjunct professor of media video promotion at Kyung Hee Cyber University, noted that the martial law decree only mentioned regulations on legacy media but did not include the internet. Shim said attempting to suppress free speech "using a martial law document reminiscent of the 1980s ... was a pipe dream". Yang Sang-hoon, editor-in-chief of the conservative The Chosun Ilbo newspaper, called Yoon's martial law the "most foolish self-destructive incident in the history of Korean presidents" and apologized for doubting earlier predictions that Yoon would make such a move.

During a press conference in Stockholm on 6 December before her Nobel lecture, 2024 Nobel Prize in Literature laureate South Korea's Han Kang, who wrote the novel Human Acts inspired by the 1980 Gwangju Uprising, called the martial law declaration a shock, but described sensing the "truthfulness and courage" of "unarmed citizens attempting to stop armed soldiers ... young police and soldiers who moved reluctantly, as if sensing some inner conflict ... striving to do the least amount of harm as possible". The declaration of martial law triggered memories in older Koreans of past military dictatorships and the authoritarian era, while younger Koreans, educated and exposed to elders sharing their experiences about abuses under past military rule, reacted with alarm and disbelief while recalling lessons about torture, imprisoned opposition leaders and deadly crackdowns on pro-democracy protests in the past. Unlike past military coups which had the endorsement of the United States, this was mainly a domestic political issue that was handled swiftly and decisively by South Korean citizens without external interference. Combined with troops refusing to abide by unjust orders, these were cited as reasons to believe that South Korean democracy and society has evolved in the last 4 decades to the point that a return to military rule or dictatorship would not be accepted.

On 12 December, 510 psychiatrists issued a statement that "since Dec. 3, the whole nation has been suffering psychologically". They said in the statement "many people who remember the history of military dictatorship and state violence were forced to relive the trauma and experience a serious level of fear". In the days following the botched martial law order, the 2023 film 12.12: The Day, a depiction of the coup organized by Chun Doo-hwan in 1979 became the no. 1 South Korean film on the streaming platform Netflix, while memes appeared online of main character Chun Doo-kwang's (based on Chun Doo-hwan) face replaced with President Yoon, and posts comparing scenes from the film with the footage of the recent events. There were calls for a theatrical re-release of the film. A letter signed by 3,000 members of South Korea's film industry, including Parasite director Bong Joon-ho, said the martial law declaration threatened to send the Korean wave "into the abyss".

=== International analysis ===
In the United States, Foreign Policy magazine, the Associated Press, political scientists Sidney Tarrow and Benjamin Engel, and coup historians Joe Wright and John J. Chin described the events as an attempted self-coup. The impeachment motion in the National Assembly also described Yoon's actions as a self-coup. The New Yorker characterized it as "a coup, almost" and an "intended coup". In the United Kingdom, The Economist described the event as an attempted coup. The Economist Intelligence Unit cited the declaration as its reason to downgrade South Korea from a "full democracy" to a "flawed democracy" in its 2024 Democracy Index. BBC News reported one Korean resident comparing it to the 2021 Myanmar coup d'état.

Reporters Without Borders criticized the declaration of martial law and its provisions allowing for military control of the press, noting that it would have led to the South Korean presidency gaining "total control over the media for the first time since the country's democratization". The martial law declaration was cited by Freedom House in its decision to give South Korea a score of 81 out of 100 in its Freedom in the World 2025 index, a reduction of two points from the previous year. The organization said that the "move highlighted one of the biggest threats faced by democracies around the world: elected leaders who attack democratic institutions".

=== International diplomatic statements ===
Multiple countries issued advisories urging caution, advising their citizens in South Korea to be vigilant and avoid public demonstrations. The White House and the United States Department of State said they were not given notice ahead of time of Yoon's intention to declare martial law, while South Korean Foreign Minister Cho Tae-yul refused to take calls from US ambassador Philip Goldberg for the duration of martial law. State Department spokesperson Vedant Patel expressed "grave concern" for the ongoing developments while reiterating the United States' "iron-clad" alliance with South Korea. Deputy Secretary of State Kurt M. Campbell called Yoon's decision to impose martial law "badly-misjudged". The White House later expressed relief at the lifting of martial law, as did United Nations Secretary-General Antonio Guterres.

Italian Foreign Minister Antonio Tajani said that NATO warned North Korea not to take advantage of the situation. The United States Department of Defense said it had not received a request for military assistance from South Korea during the declaration of martial law, adding that there was no force posture change in the United States Forces Korea (USFK). USFK Commander General Paul LaCamera urged personnel and their families to "exercise individual vigilance".

Kyrgyzstan's President Sadyr Japarov was on a state visit in South Korea when martial law was declared. The Kyrgyz government issued a statement confirming the safety of the president and his delegation. Japarov concluded the state visit and returned to Kyrgyzstan on 4 December. Swedish Prime Minister Ulf Kristersson cancelled his scheduled visit to South Korea and summit with Yoon. Meetings of the Nuclear Consultative Group and related military exercises were also postponed indefinitely by the United States, along with a visit by Defense Secretary Lloyd Austin. Japanese Defense Minister Gen Nakatani postponed a scheduled visit in late December. Kazakhstan cancelled defense meetings with its South Korean counterparts and a visit by Defense Minister Ruslan Jaqsylyqov on 5 December, while a visit by Japanese MPs from the Japan-Korea Parliamentarians' Union led by former Prime Minister Yoshihide Suga was cancelled. South Korean Foreign Minister Cho Tae-yul cancelled his scheduled address at the World Emerging Security Forum in Seoul on 5 December, while Deputy Foreign Ministers Kim Hong-kyun and Kang In-sun respectively cut short and cancelled their attendance at diplomatic meetings in Europe and the United Arab Emirates. The Ministry of Foreign Affairs issued diplomatic notes to all embassies inside South Korea emphasizing the stabilization of the domestic situation following martial law.

==== In Taiwan ====
In Taiwan, the Democratic Progressive Party Legislative Caucus posted an article on Threads, claiming that the declaration of martial law was a legitimate effort to protect free constitutional democracy in South Korea and criticizing Taiwanese opposition parties for obstructing national security proposals, allegedly "unconstitutionally expand[ing]" their powers, and reducing the defense budget. While the post was deleted shortly afterwards, it sparked criticism from major opposition parties, including the Kuomintang and the Taiwan People's Party, who interpreted it as a threat to take similar measures in Taiwan.

=== Coverage in North Korea ===
Despite having previously reported negatively on the Yoon administration on a regular basis, the state-controlled North Korean press initially refrained from reporting on the martial law declaration and its aftermath. Some South Korean analysts believed this was to avoid provoking cross-border tensions and encouraging resistance against the North Korean government. On 11 December 2024, North Korean state media released its first statements on the martial law declaration through an article published in the newspaper Rodong Sinmun, describing it as an "insane act" that was "akin to the coup d'état of the decades-ago military dictatorship era". It also described the incident as having "revealed the weakness in South Korean society" and that it hinted at the end of Yoon's political career. The newspaper also published images of anti-Yoon protests in Seoul. On the same day, North Korea's state TV described the incident as "chaos" and called the South a "fascist dictatorship". On 3 January 2025, North Korean state media said that South Korea was in "political chaos" amid ongoing attempts to arrest Yoon.

== Commemoration ==
On 17 July 2025, a monument was unveiled in front of the National Assembly building commemorating the vote that overturned martial law and the protests that occurred against the declaration. It contains an engraving: "The National Assembly of the Republic of Korea – the final bastion of democracy".

== See also ==
- 16 May coup – 1961 military coup in South Korea
- October Restoration – 1972 self-coup by the South Korean president
- Coup d'état of December Twelfth – 1979 coup d'état in South Korea that brought Chun Doo-hwan to power
- 2019 South Korean National Assembly attack – an incident where supporters of the Liberty Korea Party, a predecessor of the People Power Party, illegally invaded the National Assembly and violently attacked lawmakers of other parties.
- Impeachment of Park Geun-hye § Plans for a potential military response to protests – 2016 South Korean charging of president. The Defense Security Command planned in 2017 to declare martial law in the event Park Geun-hye was not impeached by the Constitutional Court.
- Korea Passing – Concerns about South Korea's diplomatic isolation caused by the martial law crisis
