= Korea Passing =

Neologism about South Korea

Korea Passing (Korean: 코리아 패싱) is a neologism coined in 2017 by Yoo Seung-min, the then Bareun Party presidential candidate, to describe the phenomenon of South Korea being by-passed or "given the cold shoulder" by the international community in their discussions on North Korea.

== Origin and meaning ==
The notion of a country being "passed" in global diplomatic negotiations that affect it originally derives from a 1998 incident when Bill Clinton visited China without visiting Japan, which the Japanese media called a "Japan passing", signifying Japan's isolation in its diplomatic relations with global society. "Korea passing" then emerged as a diplomatic buzzword in relation to similar situations facing South Korea in international discussions regarding North Korea.

In this context, a "passing" is a mistranslation which carries the same meaning as the English expression "to receive a cold-shoulder". However, major U.S. media outlets, including the Wall Street Journal, The Washington Post and Fox News, have continued to use the phrase "Korea passing" in reference to situations where South Korea is bypassed in negotiations.

== 2017 occurrence ==
In 2017, the first Trump administration was concerned that the incoming South Korean government of Moon Jae-in would take a more passive stance towards relations with their northern neighbor and refrain from imposing strong sanctions on North Korea. Indeed, the new South Korean administration formulated a policy to further increase economic cooperation with North Korea by resuming work on the Kaesong Industrial Complex and Mount Kumgang, thereby widening the gap between South Korea and the U.S. in their geopolitical responses towards North Korea.

Tensions on the Korean Peninsula escalated when North Korea conducted its sixth nuclear test in September 2017, and in response the Trump administration increased pressure on North Korea via additional sanctions. However, the Moon Jae-in administration did not increase pressure on North Korea in tandem with the U.S., which some considered an impediment towards a strong and united international response towards North Korea. As a result, Donald Trump contacted Japanese Prime Minister Shinzo Abe but not South Korean President Moon Jae-in, triggering claims of a "Korea passing". Relations were further strained when the U.S. Department of Defense declined to provide answers to President Moon Jae-in's questions concerning the unauthorized deployment of THAAD (Terminal High Altitude Area Defense) assets in South Korean territory.

On 21 September 2017 the New York Times published an article claiming that South Korea would be the "odd man out" at the Korea/U.S./Japan summit due to differences in South Korea's policy on North Korea. But in a press conference with Moon Jae-i when he visited South Korea on 7 November 2017, Trump commented that "[South] Korea is a very important country", confirmed that "there will be no exclusion [of South Korea]", and denied that there was any "Korea passing". However, conservative opposition parties in South Korea insisted that Trump's comments were typical diplomatic rhetoric and that the controversy about "Korea passing" would continue because no formal agreements were reached. The Wall Street Journal decried Moon Jae-in's policies on the Kaesong Industrial Complex and the THAAD deployment, saying that Moon Jae-in was an "unreliable friend", and that the U.S. still viewed his administration negatively.

== 2018 occurrence ==
Prior to the May 2018 summit between South Korea and the U.S., Trump called Moon Jae-in just before Moon's scheduled visit to the U.S., expressing his discomfort with the gap between Moon's pledge and North Korea's denuclearization stance. During the summit Trump's demeanour further indicated dissatisfaction, and he scaled back a scheduled and exclusive media interview. During a press conference at the summit Trump was asked a total of 28 questions while Moon Jae-in was only given the opportunity to respond twice, and Trump also cut off the Korean-to-English interpreter when the interpreter began to interpret Moon Jae-in's last reply, saying "I'm sure that's what I've heard before, so I don't have to listen to an interpreter". On 24 May, Trump announced the cancellation of the scheduled June 2018 North Korea/U.S. Summit without notice to South Korea, who belatedly received news of the cancellation through Twitter. And when the 2019 Koreas/United States DMZ Summit was held on 30 June 2019, Trump allegedly did not want Moon to join him.

Controversy over "Korea passing" resurfaced after these incidents, including statements by Hong Jun-pyo of the Liberty Korea Party. He contended that Moon Jae-in's administration was excluded from North Korea/U.S. summit negotiations, and that the success of negotiations was now up to the U.S. and China.

== 2019 occurrence ==
In Japan, some public figures argued that "polite ignorance" was the best way to deal with Moon Jae-in's administration. The Japanese government argued that, since 2018, the legal foundation of the friendly and cooperative relationship between the two countries had been overthrown, and that they should position themselves as waiting for South Korea to resolve this internationally illegal situation. And by lowering South Korea's standing in the Defense of Japan 2019 white paper, Japan further denigrated South Korea's position as a security partner. So when the South Korean government failed to arrange a summit meeting with Japan during the 2019 G20 Osaka summit, controversy again erupted in South Korea over "Korea Passing". The former South Korean minister of foreign affairs, Gong Ro-myung, criticized the Korean government for acting like amateurs, leading to South Korea/Japan relations hitting rock bottom politically and economically.

== 2024 occurrence ==
Following the coup by Yoon Suk-yeol, leaders from around the world appeared to avoid diplomatic activities with the South Korean government. U.S. Secretary of Defense Lloyd Austin decided not to visit South Korea, and the Prime Minister of Japan, Shigeru Ishiba, was said to have canceled his plan to visit South Korea and was instead coordinating a visit to Southeast Asia and Indonesia. So when, on 13 December 2024, now-President-elect Trump said that he would meet Kim Jong-un once the wars in Ukraine and Gaza were over, there were concerns that South Korea would be subjected to another "Korea Passing" unless Yoon Suk-yeol was impeached.

However, after the second impeachment motion was passed by the South Korean National Assembly on 14 December 2024, the U.S. government said that they "highly value the resilience of South Korea's democracy and the rule of law", and expressed U.S. readiness to work with the acting South Korean president. But in the event, President-elect Trump declared a meeting with Japanese Prime Minister Shigeru Ishiba before he took office, not mentioning South Korea at all. This led to further concerns of "Korea Passing" and that South Korea's diplomatic isolation and decline in international status would continue unless the Constitutional Court of Korea quickly decided to impeach Yoon Suk-yeol.

== See also ==
- Foreign relations of South Korea
- Globalization
- North Korea–United States summit (disambiguation)
- 2024 South Korean martial law
