= 1st Security Group (South Korea) =

Unit of the Republic of Korea Army

- 제1경비단
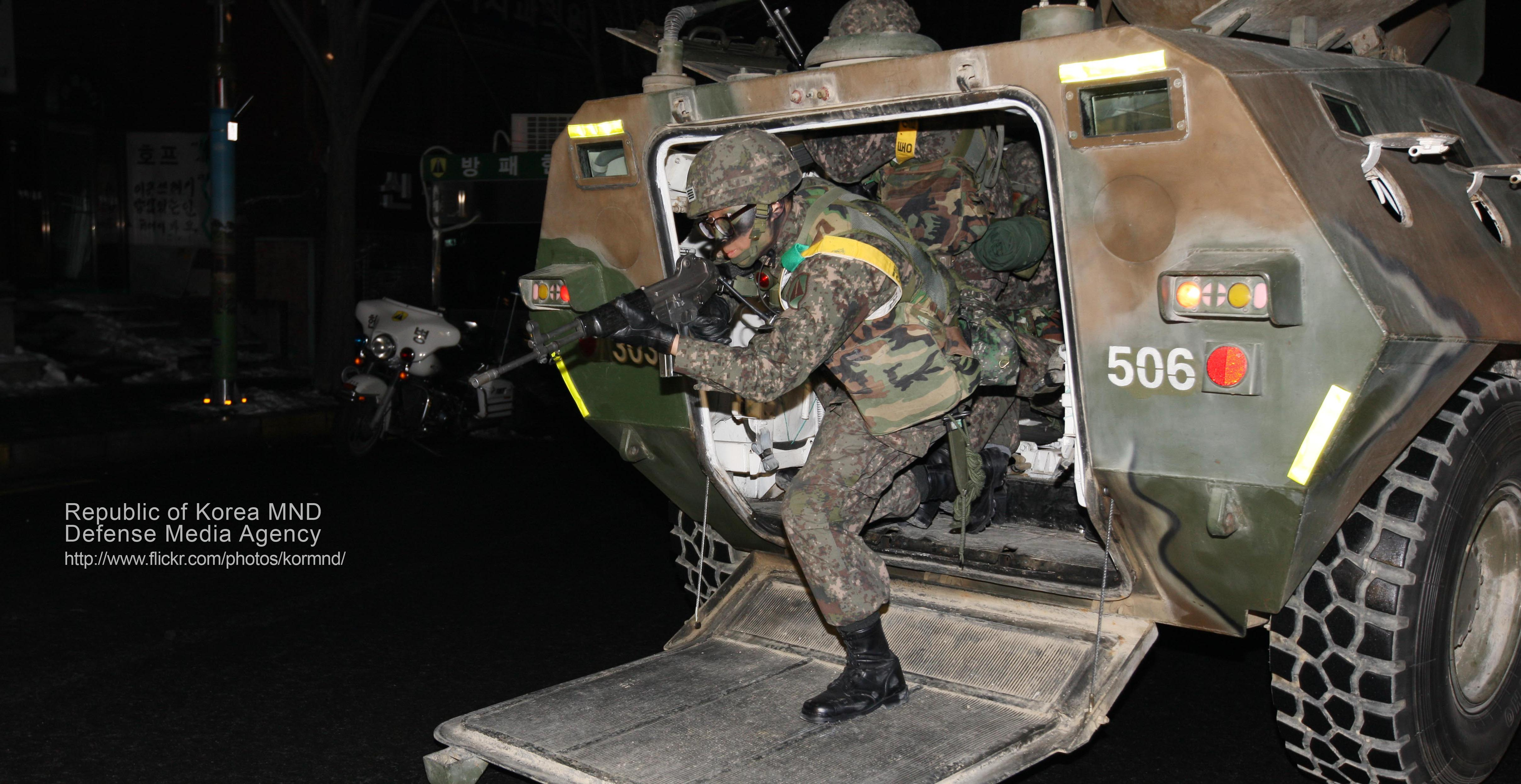
- Soldiers from the 1st Security Group in training at Segomjeong, Seoul
- Active: 17 December 1996 – present
- Country: South Korea
- Branch: Republic of Korea Army
- Type: Combined arms
- Role: Guard
- Size: At least 520
- Part of: Capital Defense Command
- Garrison/HQ: Seodaemun District, Seoul
- Engagements: 2024 South Korean martial law crisis

Commanders
- Current commander: Colonel Cho Sung-hyun

The 1st Security Group (Korean: 제1경비단, romanized: Je 1 Gyeongbidan) is a military formation of the Republic of Korea Army. The group is subordinated to the Capital Defense Command. It headquartered in Seodaemun District, Seoul, and have the mission to guards Mt. Bukak, Mt. Inwang, the central part of downtown Seoul, and the Blue House.

== History ==
According to the plan by President Kim Young-sam to liquidate the remnants of the military dictatorship, on 17 December 1996, the 30th and 33rd Security Group were incorporated, and the 1st Security Group was established.

The unit's main mission is to protect the president of Korea, the Blue House and its surrounding areas but after the President Yoon Suk Yeol moved his office to Yongsan, the existence of the unit became less important and the number of troops was reduced to "just enough to maintain the safety for the Bugaksan's hikers".

=== 2024 South Korean martial law crisis ===
During the 2024 South Korean martial law crisis, the unit was spotted using K808 White Tiger APCs. Lee Jin-woo, the commanding officer of South Korea's Capital Defense Command, reported that 211 soldiers of the 1st Security Group had been deployed to the National Assembly building.

== Organization ==
- Headquarters (Seodaemun District)
  - Signal Troop
  - Transport Troop
  - Armored Company (K808 APC)
  - Chemical unit
  - Combat Support Company

Equipped with 81mm mortars and 106mm recoilless guns mounted on light truck

- 30th Security Battalion
- 33rd Security Battalion
