= North Korea–United States summit =

North Korea–United States summit may refer to:

- 2018 North Korea–United States Singapore Summit, June 2018 summit meeting in Sentosa, Singapore, between Kim Jong Un and Donald Trump
- 2019 North Korea–United States Hanoi Summit, February 2019 summit meeting in Hanoi, Vietnam, between Kim Jong Un and Donald Trump
- 2019 Koreas–United States DMZ Summit, June 2019 summit meeting in the Korean Demilitarized Zone, between Kim Jong Un, Donald Trump, and Moon Jae-in

== See also ==
- Kim–Putin meetings (disambiguation)
