= Health in South Korea =

Life expectancy development in South Korea

Life expectancy has been rising rapidly and South Korea ranked 3rd in the world for life expectancy (previously 11th in 2016). South Korea has among the lowest HIV/AIDS adult prevalence rate in the world, with just 0.1% of the population being infected, significantly lower than the U.S. at 0.6%, France's 0.4%, and the UK's 0.3% prevalence rate. South Korea has a high influenza vaccination rate, with 43.5% of the population vaccinated in 2019 (80.8% of people over 65). A new measure of expected human capital calculated for 195 countries from 1920 to 2016 and defined for each birth cohort as the expected years lived from age 20 to 64 years and adjusted for educational attainment, learning or education quality, and functional health status was published by The Lancet in September 2018. South Korea had the sixth-highest level of expected human capital, with 26 health, education, and learning-adjusted expected years lived between ages 20 and 64.

Obesity has been consistently among the world's lowest—only 3% of the population were obese, which was the second lowest in the OECD, compared to over 30% in the U.S. or 23% in the UK. As a result, mortality from cardiovascular disease was the fourth lowest in the OECD.

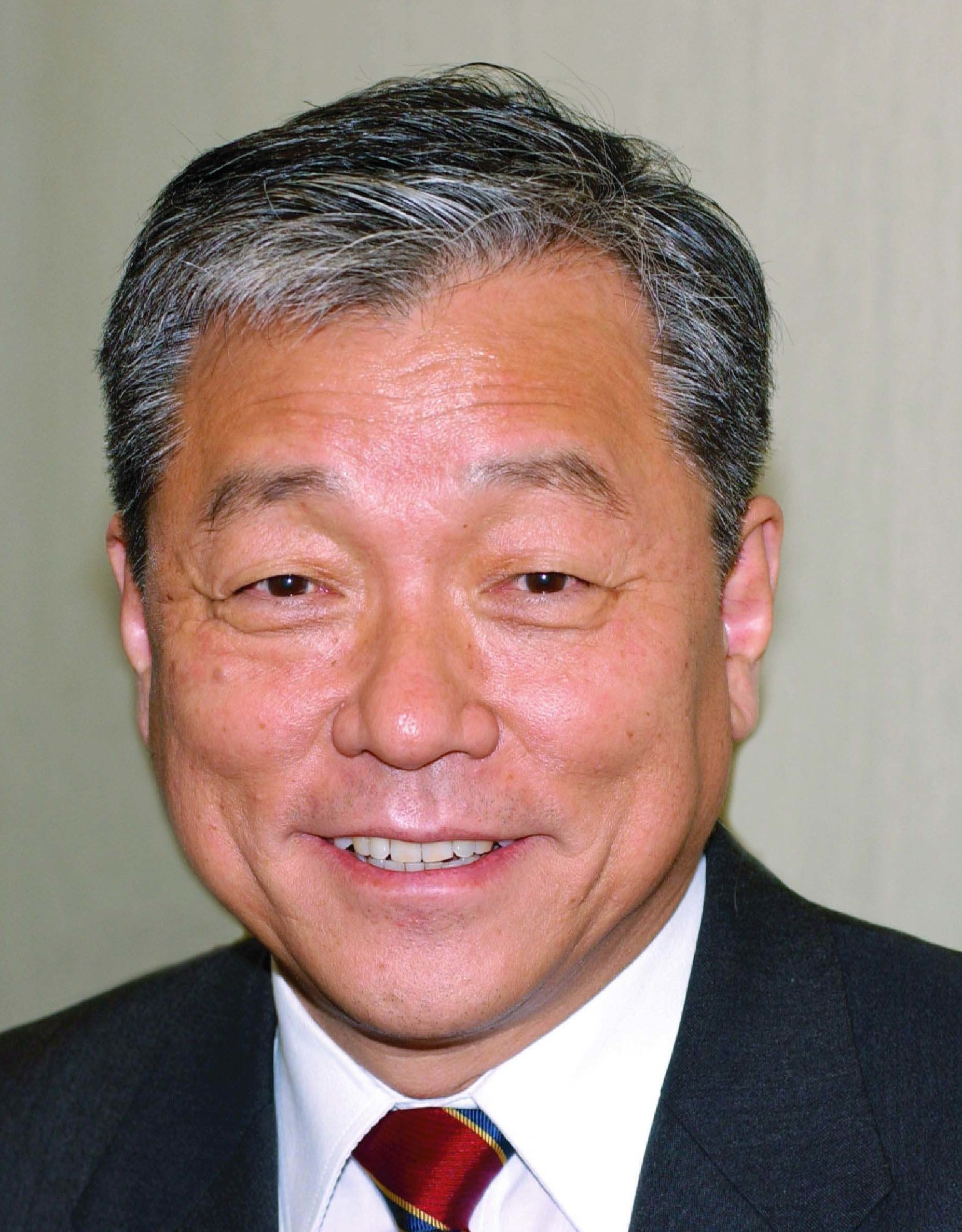
Lee Jong-wook, former director-general of the World Health Organization, who dedicated his work to combating tuberculosis and HIV/AIDS, along with eradicating polio

== Health issues ==
=== Cancer ===
The cancer treatment in South Korea is regarded as one of the best in the world, with South Korea also having the highest cancer survival rate. Liver cancer is the second leading cause of cancer-related deaths in South Korea, as well as the sixth most prevalent type of cancer in South Korea. In addition, South Korea has a rather similar level of incidence when it comes to liver cancer patients. In a study in 2014, out of the 16,178 cases of people with liver cancer, 12,058 were men, and 4,120 were women, which brings the male-to-female ratio to 2.9:1. The most common ages where primary liver cancer cases were diagnosed was found to be between the ages 50–59 years (27.3%), subsequently the ages between 60-69 (25.2%) also had high levels of liver cancer patients. As for women who had liver cancer, they generally diagnosed the illness at a much higher age range when compared to male counterparts. Furthermore, lung cancer is responsible for the most deaths in South Korea. However, there have been attempts to minimize the smoking trends in South Korea and yet the rate of lung cancer patients is still increasing, this can be attributed to the aging population of South Korea and the incidence of lung cancer in never-smokers. It was found that in 2012, the rate of lung cancer cases for every 100,000 residents was 43.9, and the survival rate increased to 21.9% from the years 2008 to 2012. In South Korea, the number of cancer survivors has increased gradually, in addition to a higher percentage of individuals who have been diagnosed with cancer. The percentage of cancer cases has increased by 3.4% per year, while the percentage of mortality has decreased by 2.7% per year. Depression is a common variable observed amongst long-term survivors as they are considered higher-risk for dealing with such health condition which can result in suicide if not taken seriously.

=== Suicide ===
Suicide in South Korea is a serious and widespread problem. The suicide rate was the highest in the OECD in 2012 (29.1 deaths per 100,000 people). Lithuania is ranked first, but is not an OECD member state as of September 2016. Age and gender distribution of suicide rates differed considerably between the two countries On the 27 December, South Korean actor Lee Sun-kyun, best known by Oscar-winning film Parasite was found dead in an apparent suicide.

=== Obesity ===
In 2022, the general obesity rate in South Korea remained at 37.2 percent. This was the second-highest rate recorded, beginning around 2008. Obesity was defined as a body mass index (BMI) of 25 or higher. South Korean men had a higher obesity rate than women. This data is based on the ages of 19 and older.

=== Smoking ===
In 2020, 16.4% of Koreans were noted to be daily smokers. According to the WHO in 2015, the age-standardized prevalence of tobacco smoking in the Republic of South Korea is 49.8%. Starting on January 1, 2015, the Ministry of Health banned smoking in cafés, restaurants, and bars. Facilities, such as government offices, public institutions, public transport facilities, and schools, have become smoke-free zones. In 1986, the Republic of Korea mandated tobacco manufactures to include warnings on cigarette packages. The violation against the smoke policy includes a fine, which is less than 100 thousand won.

=== Drinking alcohol ===
Alcohol consumption in Korea stood at 8.3L per person in 2020 (compared to 12.9L in Latvia and 1.3L in Turkey) according to the OECD. In 2018, the WHO noted that alcohol consumption distribution was 22.2% beer, 1.9% wine, 7.1% spirits, and 68.9% is attributed to "other.

Age-standardized death rate of liver cirrhosis for males in South Korea is 20.6%, of which 70.5% is attributed to alcohol. Prevalence of alcohol use disorders (including alcohol dependence and harmful use of alcohol) is 10.3% of male in South Korea, more than twice of 4.6% of Western Pacific Region.

=== Infectious disease ===
An outbreak of Middle East respiratory syndrome (MERS) occurred in South Korea in May 2015 when a Korean who visited the Middle East carried the MERS virus to Korea. Seven months later, the government officially declared that the outbreak was over.

=== Air pollution ===
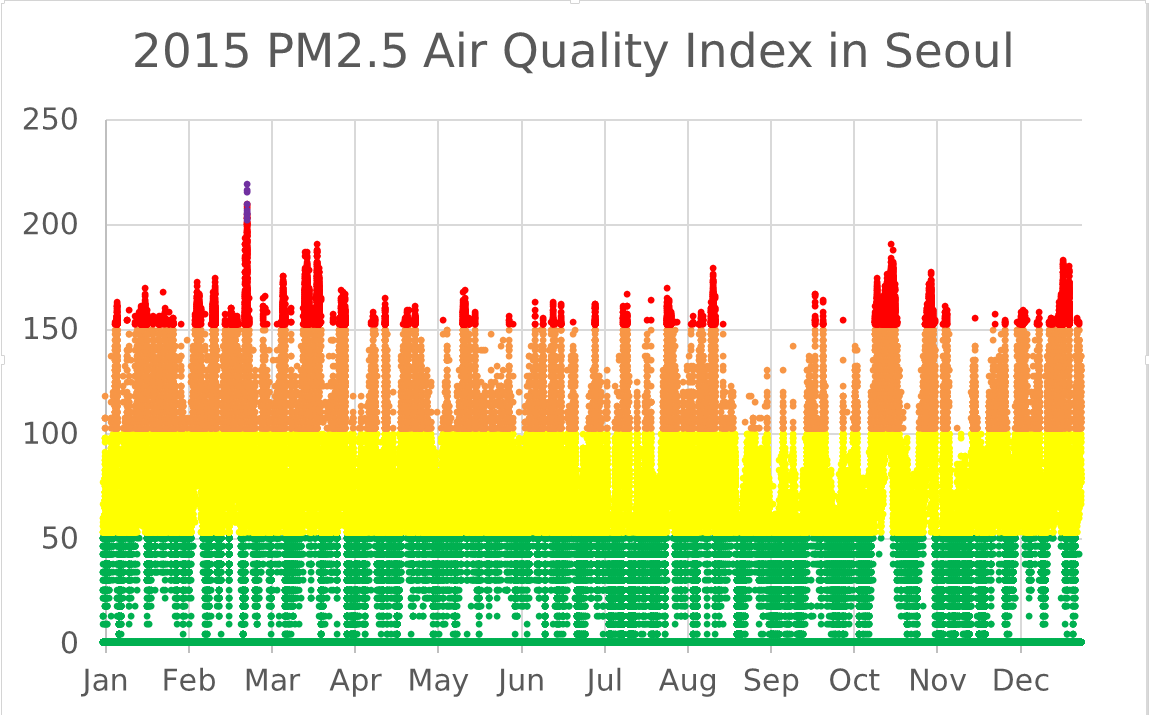
South Korea near bottom of world survey of air quality Very Unhealthy Unhealthy Unhealthy for sensitive groups Moderate Good

According to the Environmental Performance Index 2016, South Korea ranked 173rd out of 180 countries in terms of air quality. More than 50 percent of the population in South Korea is exposed to dangerous levels of fine dust.

=== Tuberculosis ===
South Korea ranks last among OECD countries for tuberculosis. Its three major indexes: incidence rate, prevalence rate, and death rate are the worst among the OECD countries since 1996 when South Korea became a member of OECD.

2019 Tuberculosis statistics - OECD (per 100,000 person)
| | Incidence (Estimated) | | Treatment Success (%) | | Mortality (unweighted average) | |
| | Country | Value | Country | Value | Country | Value |
|---|---|---|---|---|---|---|
| Highest | Philippines | 554.0 | Cambodia | 94.0 | Philippines | 24.0 |
| | South Korea | 66.0 | Korea, South | 83.0 | South Korea | 4.7 |
| Lowest | Australia | 7.0 | China | 65.0 | Australia | 0.2 |
| OECD Average | | 13.0 | | 62.0 | | 0.8 |

=== Chronic disease ===
According to the Ministry of Health and Welfare, chronic illness accounts for the majority of diseases in South Korea, a condition exacerbated by the health care system's focus on treatment rather than prevention. The incidence of chronic disease in South Korea hovers around 24 percent. The number of human immunodeficiency virus (HIV) cases in 2015 was 14,880 cases. In 2001, central government expenditures on health care accounted for about 6 percent of gross domestic product (GDP). South Korea is experiencing a growing elderly population, which leads to an increase in chronic degenerative diseases. The proportion of the population aged 65 and over is expected to rise from 13% in 2014 to 38% in 2050. The majority of health care professionals treat patients with curative rather than preventive treatments because of the lack of financial incentives for preventive care.

=== Unequal distribution of physicians ===
There are 2.5 doctors and 7.9 nurses per 1,000 people in South Korea (2020). There are regional disparities between urban and rural areas for health professionals. The number of primary care doctors in cities is 37.3% higher than in rural areas, and the problem is growing as younger physicians choose to practice in cities.

== See also ==
- Healthcare in South Korea
- Mental health in South Korea
- LGBT health in South Korea
