= Jeong Eun-kyeong =

South Korean physician and epidemiologist (born 1965)

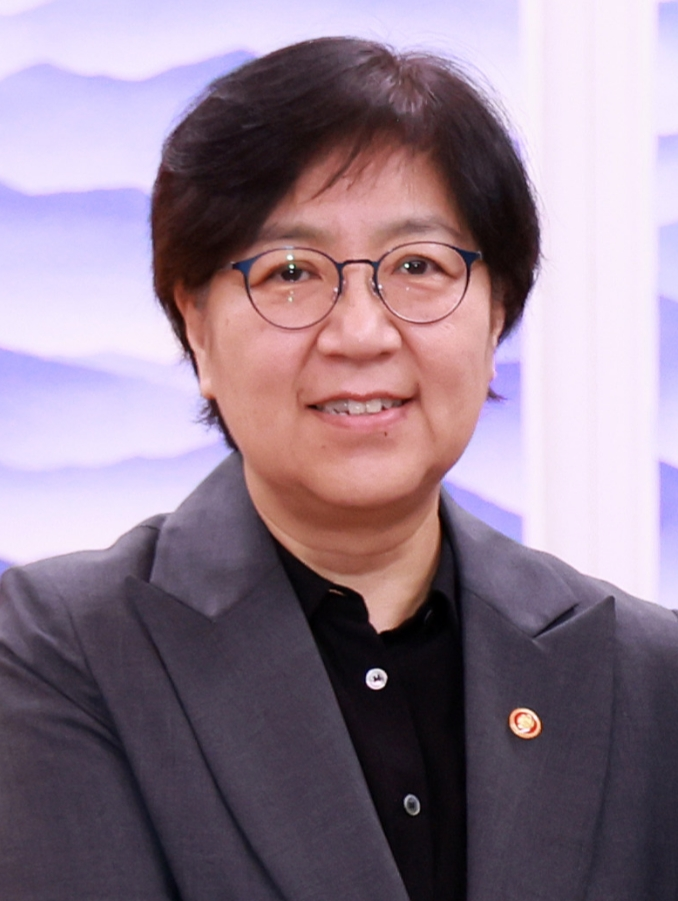
- Jeong in 2025

Minister of Health and Welfare
- Incumbent
- Assumed office 21 July 2025
- President: Lee Jae-myung
- Preceded by: Cho Kyoo-hong

Commissioner of the Korea Disease Control and Prevention Agency
- In office 12 September 2020 – 17 May 2022
- President: Moon Jae-in
- Prime Minister: Chung Sye-kyun, Kim Boo-kyum
- Minister: Park Neung-hoo, Kwon Deok-chul
- Preceded by: Position established
- Succeeded by: Peck Kyong-ran

Director of the KCDC
- In office 26 July 2017 – 11 September 2020
- President: Moon Jae-in
- Prime Minister: Lee Nak-yeon, Chung Sye-kyun
- Minister: Park Neung-hoo
- Preceded by: Jung Ki-seok
- Succeeded by: Position abolished

Personal details
- Born: 9 July 1965 (age 61) Gwangju, South Korea
- Education: Seoul National University

Korean name
- Hangul: 정은경
- Hanja: 鄭銀敬
- RR: Jeong Eungyeong
- MR: Chŏng Ŭn'gyŏng

Jeong Eun-kyeong (Korean: 정은경; born 9 July 1965) is a South Korean infectious disease and public health expert who has served as the minister of health and welfare since 2025. She previously held office as the first commissioner of KDCA, Korea Disease Control and Prevention Agency, from 2020 to 2022. Jeong was previously the first woman to lead its preceding agency, KCDC, which history dates back to 1981.

== Early life and education ==
Jeong received her secondary education at Jeonnam Girls' High School. She subsequently attended Seoul National University, where she earned a Doctor of Medicine (M.D.) degree from the College of Medicine. She later obtained a Master of Public Health (M.P.H.) and a Doctor of Philosophy (Ph.D.) in preventive medicine from the same institution.

== Career ==
=== Early career ===
During the 2009 swine flu pandemic, Jeong led the Division of Disease Policy at the Ministry of Health and Welfare. In 2015, during the MERS outbreak, she was responsible for press briefings and crisis management as the head of the Center for Disease Prevention of KCDC and field investigation team of central task force. In 2016 Board of Audit and Inspection ordered suspension of nine public health officials including Jeong for their failure to stop the worst MERS outbreak outside of the Middle East. Her suspension was reduced to 1-month of reduced pay after the Board was harshly criticized by the medical and scientific community for only punishing scientists such as Jeong, rather than politicians and administrators in charge. From the early stage of COVID-19 outbreak in January 2020, Jeong has held daily briefings to report its status quo and answer questions from reporters by herself and from May 2020 every two days with the other given by the Director of KDCA's KNIH.

Jeong is included in Time's 100 Most Influential People of 2020, BBC's 100 women of 2020 and Bloomberg 50.

=== Director of KCDC ===
Upon the beginning of President Moon Jae-in's presidency in 2017, Jeong was appointed as the Director of KCDC. She first joined the organization, then-KNIH, as a researcher in 1998 after working at public health office in Yangju. Since then she has been working at the organisation apart from years from 2009 to 2014 when she worked at its parent organization, Ministry of Health and Welfare, as its head of Division of Disease Policy, Division of Healthcare Technology and later Division of Emergency Healthcare. In February 2014 she returned to KCDC to lead its Department of Chronic Disease Control Research and a month later its Center for Disease Prevention. Before promoted as the head of KCDC in 2017, she had led KCDC's Center for Public Health Emergency Preparedness and Response from 2016.

=== Commissioner of KDCA ===
On 8 September 2020, President Moon designated Jeong as the Commissioner of Korea Disease Control and Prevention Agency (KDCA) with her term commencing on 12 September making her as the last Director of KCDC and the first Commissioner of KDCA. She will continue to lead the same organization she has served but with more autonomy and resources. On her last day as KCDC Director, President Moon visited its headquarters for Jeong's appointment ceremony as the first Commissioner of KDCA which is unorthodox given that the Prime Minister usually hosts such events for vice-ministerial posts. Jeong is the first person to have their appointment ceremony hosted by the President Moon not to be held at the Blue House.

On 15 January 2021, President Moon requested Jung and KDCA to lead Korea's COVID-19 vaccination programme in addition to ongoing virus containment in the country. Jung is responsible for its inter-departmental cooperation and coordination as vaccines are authorised by Ministry of Food and Drug Safety, transported to the country by Ministry of Land, Infrastructure and Transport and distributed to vaccination centres by Ministry of National Defense.

It was later revealed that Jeong rejected President Moon's requests multiple times to ease entry restrictions for asymptomatic people coming into the country at the hike of the pandemic.

== Awards ==
- Time's 100 most influential people of 2020
- She was on the list of the BBC's 100 Women announced on 23 November 2020.
- The Bloomberg 50 in 2020
