= Cho Kyoo-hong =

South Korean politician (born 1967)

- 조규홍
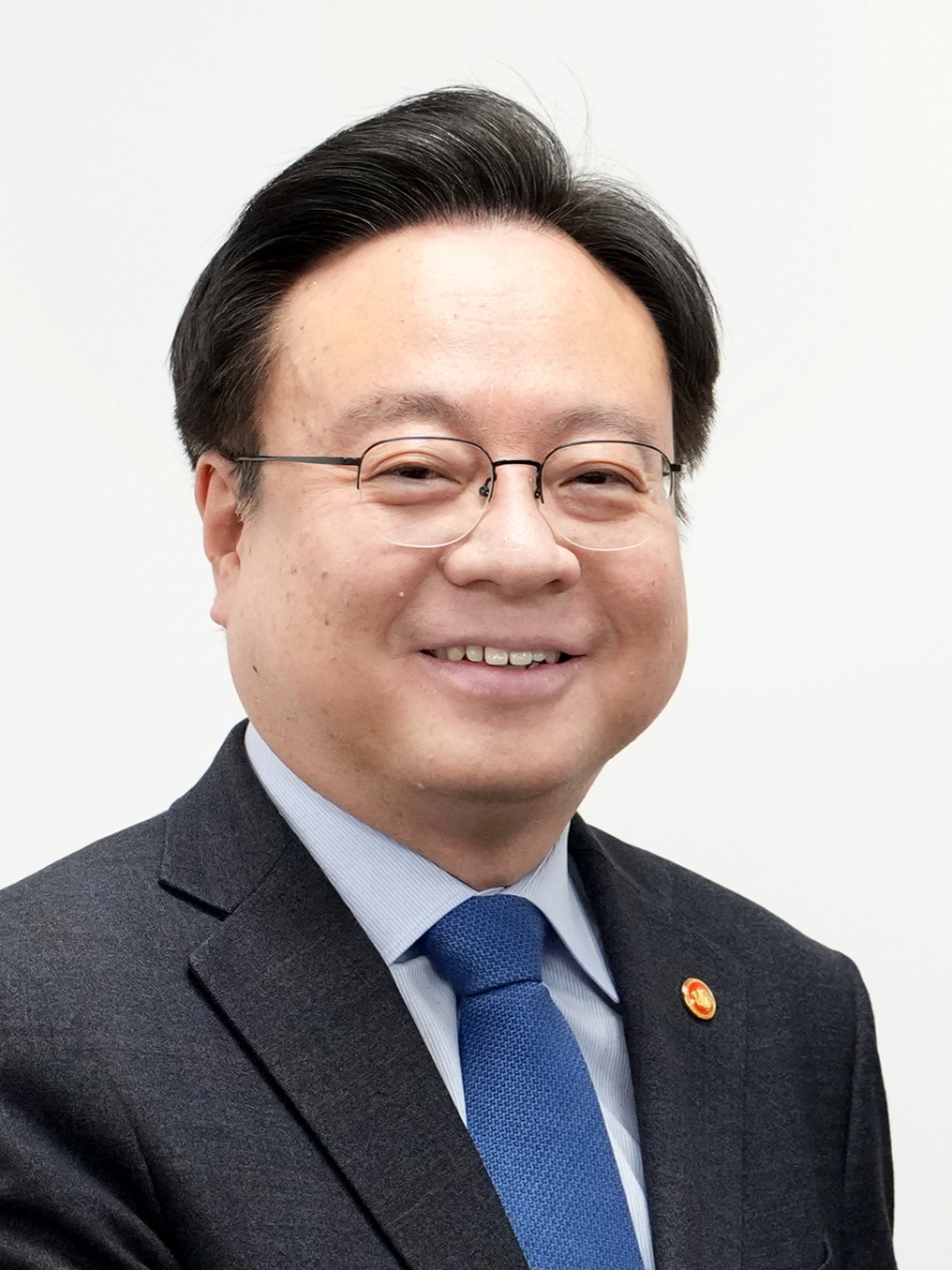
- Cho in 2025

Minister of Health and Welfare
- In office 5 October 2022 – 21 July 2025
- President: Yoon Suk Yeol
- Prime Minister: Han Duck-soo
- Preceded by: Kwon Deok-cheol
- Succeeded by: Jeong Eun-kyeong

Personal details
- Born: 19 February 1967 (age 59) Haman, South Gyeongsang, South Korea
- Party: Independent
- Education: Seoul National University (BA, MPA); University of Colorado Boulder (MA, PhD)

Cho Kyoo-hong (Korean: 조규홍; Hanja: 曺圭鴻; born 19 February 1967) is a South Korean government official who served as the minister of health and welfare from 2022 to 2025. As the first deputy health minister, Cho served as acting minister after former Minister Kwon Deok-cheol left office in May. He was the third person appointed by President Yoon to fill the position after the first two nominees were forced to step down amid controversy.

== Early life and education ==
Cho graduated from Seoul National University with a bachelor's degree in economics and a master's degree in public administration. He received his Ph.D. in economics from the University of Colorado.
