= Healthcare in South Korea =

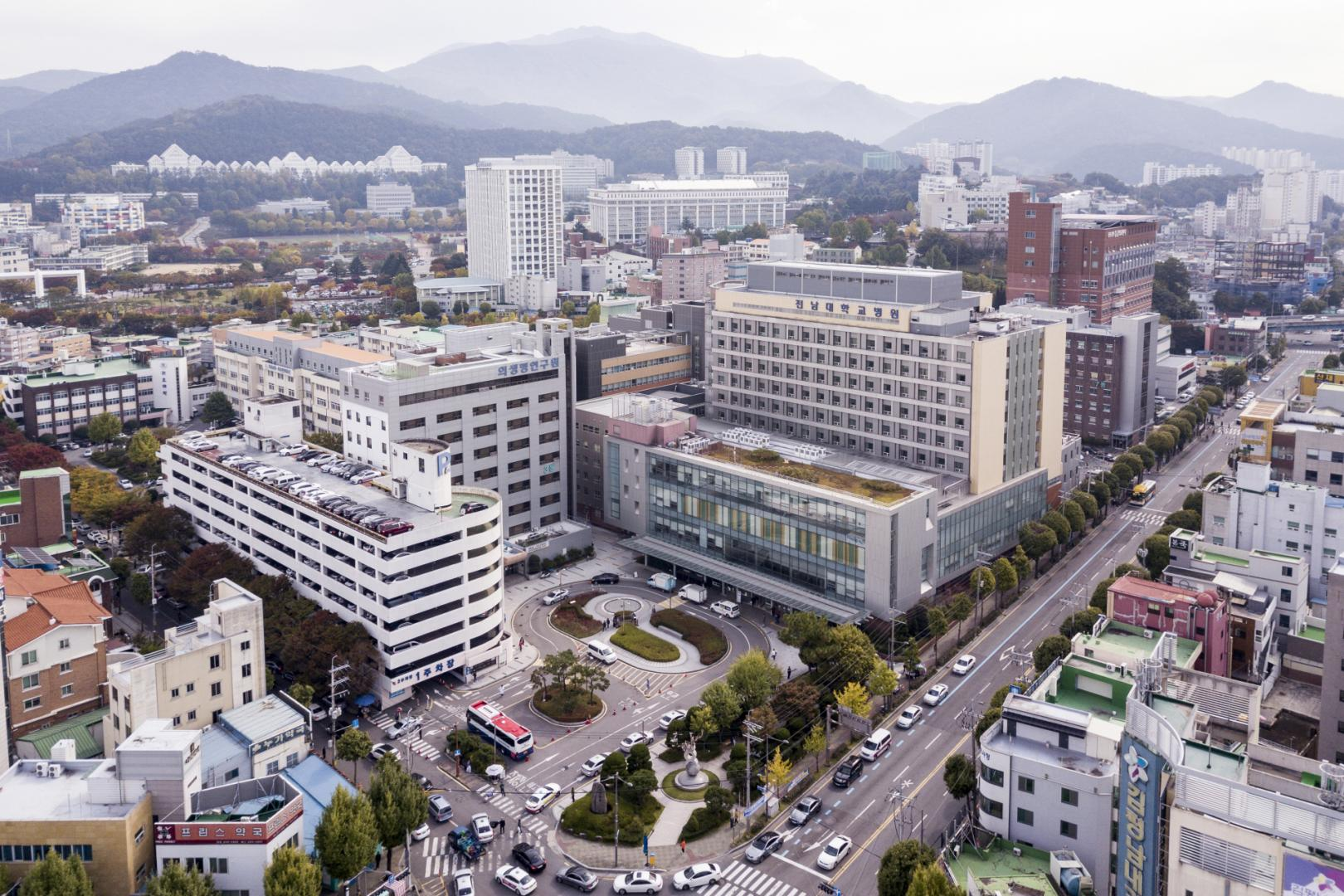
Chonnam National University in Gwangju

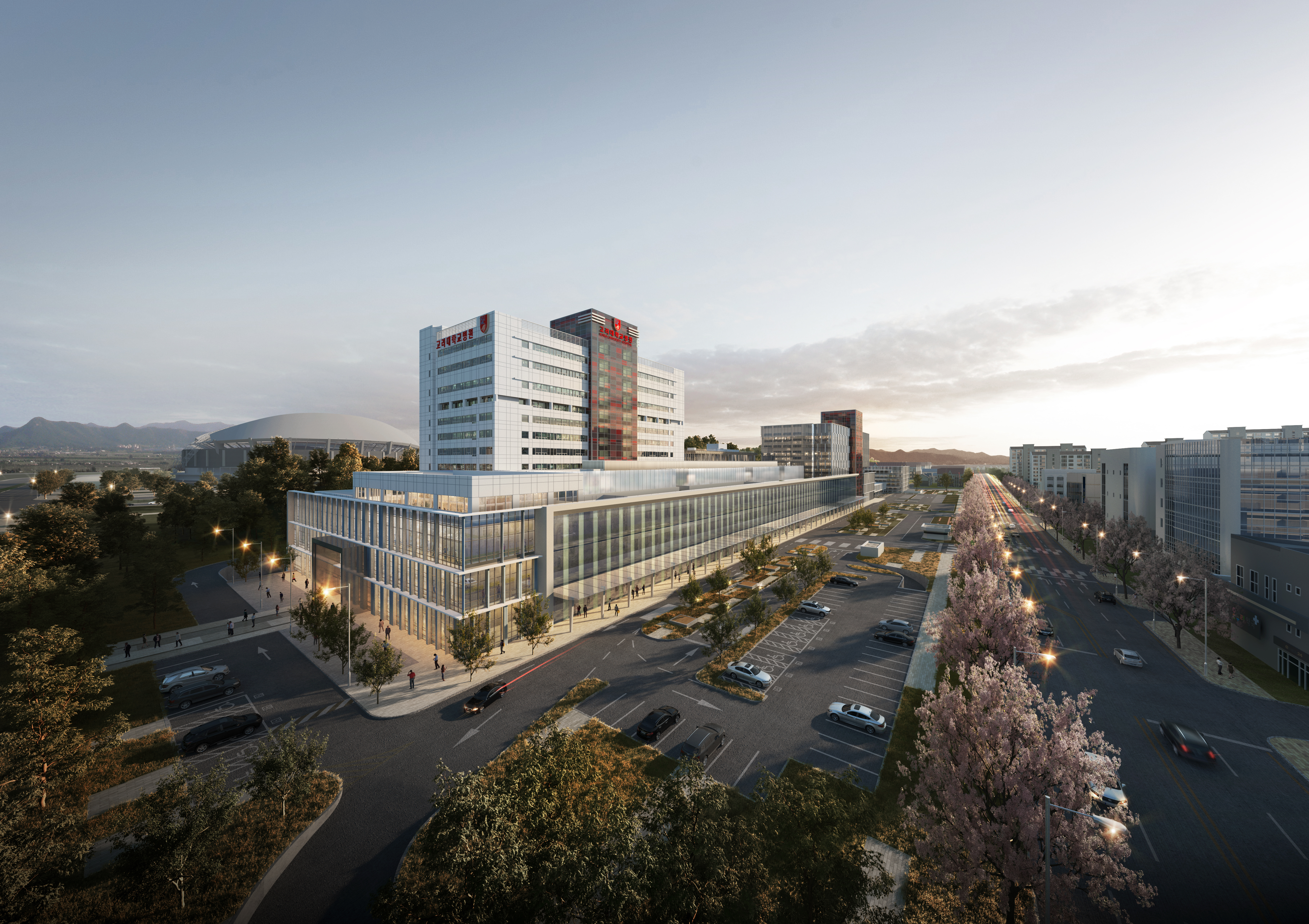
Korea University Medical Center Korea University in Seoul

Healthcare in South Korea is universal, although a significant portion of healthcare is privately funded. South Korea's healthcare system is based on the National Health Insurance Service, a public health insurance program run by the Ministry of Health and Welfare to which South Koreans of sufficient income must pay contributions in order to insure themselves and their dependants, and the Medical Aid Program, a social welfare program run by the central government and local governments to insure those unable to pay National Health Insurance contributions. In 2015, South Korea ranked first in the OECD for healthcare access.

Satisfaction of healthcare has been consistently among the highest in the world; South Korea was rated as the second most efficient healthcare system by Bloomberg. Health insurance in South Korea is single-payer system. The introduction of health insurance resulted in a significant surge in the utilization of healthcare services.

Healthcare providers are overburdened by the government relying on their workforce. Healthcare providers are prosecuted for criminal malpractice at a much higher rate than expected for a country like South Korea, probably due to low legal protections. Patients too often cannot get treatment.

== History ==
After the Korean War ended in 1953, South Korea's medical infrastructure and healthcare system needed attention. To help Korea get back on its feet, the University of Minnesota and Seoul National University launched the Minnesota Project from 1955 to 1961. This project familiarized South Korean health professionals with medical methodology and cultivated a new wave of health leaders. It also increased public knowledge of proper sanitation and organized hospitals by the department. Due to the success it received, the Minnesota Project is accredited with pushing Korea's healthcare industry into what it is today.

In December 1963, South Korea implemented their first health insurance law: the Medical Insurance Act. This allowed companies to provide voluntary health insurance to its employees. Then in 1977, the law was revised to make health insurance mandatory. President Park Chung-Hee also mandated employee medical insurance in firms of 500 or more employees and introduced the Medical Aid Program which provides medical services for low-income citizens. Insurance would then proceed to be provided for government workers in 1979 and self-employed individuals in 1981. Coverage would continue to expand, and in a mere 12 years, in 1989, national health insurance (NHI) extended to the entire country, providing universal health care for all citizens.

In 2000, the National Health Insurance Service (NHIS; Korean: 국민건강보험; RR: Gukmin Geongang Boheom), was founded to combine all health insurances into a single national health insurer. As of April 2024, about 97% of South Korea's population is covered by the National Health Insurance Program—roughly 36 million people (68.5%) as employee insured, with dependents included, and about 15 million (28.5%) as self-employed insured—while the remaining 3% (about 1.5 million people) are covered by the Medical Aid Program.

== Comparisons ==
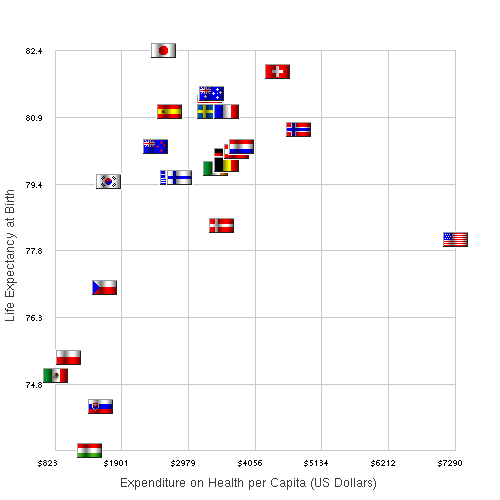
Comparison of healthcare spending and life expectancy for some countries in 2007

The quality of South Korean healthcare has been ranked as being among the world's best. It had the OECD's highest colorectal cancer survival rate at 72.8%, significantly ahead of Denmark's 55.5% or the UK's 54.5%. It ranked second in cervical cancer survival rate at 76.8%, significantly ahead of Germany's 64.5% or the U.S. at 62.2%. Hemorrhagic stroke 30-day in-hospital mortality per 100 hospital discharges was the OECD's third lowest at 13.7 deaths, which was almost half the amount as the U.S. at 22.3 or France's 24 deaths. For Ischemic stroke, it ranked second at 3.4 deaths, which was almost a third of Australia's 9.4 or Canada's 9.7 deaths. South Korean hospitals ranked 4th for MRI units per capita and 6th for CT scanners per capita in the OECD. It also had the OECD's second largest number of hospital beds per 1000 people at 9.56 beds, which was over triple that of Sweden's 2.71, Canada's 2.75, the UK's 2.95, or the U.S. at 3.05 beds.

Much of the advancement of the South Korean healthcare system are due in part to the training and programs that South Korea put many of its health care providers through to maintain their high rankings amongst other OECD rated nations. For example, at the Kyung Hee University Medical Center, medical students are taught not only traditional eastern care methods, but also western medical techniques along with more complex and comprehensive Korean treatments. Another example of this is a portion of medical student studies at the same medical facility where students learn about dermatological practices that can allow patients to heal faster post-surgery.

While not all medical students will require the knowledge of each specialty they learn during their medical training in South Korea, these programs ensures that new medical personnel have a broader understanding of the medical field and can better prepare them for the complexities of the modern medical world more effectively than many other leading nations. Many nations do not have training programs for nurses and other CNL students that provide them with international knowledge of healthcare. South Korea is one of the few nations who as begun developing value in their medical teachings by introducing the rapidly advancing medical techniques at the CNL level for its students. While the American Association of Colleges of Nursing stresses that all nurse leaders should understand the total healthcare system, including its organizational and financial methods at an international level, these teachings have primarily been only in lecture or other observational methods. Few systems were found in nations outside of South Korea where medical students participated in medical care techniques taught in other nations, and few journals have addressed this gap in knowledge.

== Health insurance system ==
=== Single-payer ===
Social health insurance was introduced with the 1977 National Health Insurance Act, which provided industrial workers in large corporations with health insurance. The program was expanded in 1979 to include other workers, such as government employees and private teachers. This program was thereafter progressively rolled out to the general public, finally achieving universal coverage in 1989. Despite being able to achieve universal health care, this program resulted in more equity issues within society as it grouped people into different categories based on demographic factors like geographical location and employment type. These different groups ultimately received different coverage from their respective healthcare providers.

The healthcare system was initially reliant on not-for-profit insurance societies to manage and provide health insurance coverage. As the program expanded from 1977 to 1989, the government decided to allow different insurance societies to provide coverage for different sections of the population in order to minimize government intervention in the health insurance system. This eventually produced a very inefficient system, which resulted in more than 350 different health insurance societies. A major healthcare financing reform in 2000 merged all medical societies into the National Health Insurance Service (NHIS). This new service became a single-payer healthcare system in 2004. The four-year delay occurred because of disagreements in the legislature on how to properly assess self-employed individuals in order to determine their contribution.

In the year 2000, the National Health Insurance Act introduced the Mandatory Designation System on hospitals and clinics. Under this system, all hospitals and clinics in South Korea are required to be designated as medical care institutions and are obligated to offer medical care services to enrollees of the National Health Insurance Program, which includes nearly all citizens.

In 2024, the Ministry of Health and Welfare announced a 2024-28 comprehensive plan supported by more than 10 trillion won (US$7.47 billion), with the aim to better compensate "essential but undervalued medical services to tackle the shortage of medical professionals in certain sectors, as well as target the issues of overtreatment and overspending in the national health care system." To address the high frequency of visits per year and incentivize responsible use of the national health insurance system, the ministry announced plans to adjust patient rates based on system use: patients with a demonstrated tendency to overuse will receive adjusted rates—that is, patients will be responsible for a higher percentage of the cost of treatment.

In 2024, the Supreme Court of South Korea ruled in favor of a gay couple seeking spousal coverage for National Health Insurance benefits, in a landmark decision that acknowledged same-sex couples as eligible dependents to be covered, and that failure to offer coverage was an unjust discrimination without reasonable cause, thereby violating the constitutional principle of equality under Article 11 of the Constitution of the Republic of Korea that all citizens shall be equal before the law and that there shall be no discrimination in political, economic, social, or cultural life based on sex, religion, or social status.

=== Funding ===
The insurance system is funded by worker contributions, government subsidies, and tobacco surcharges. The National Health Insurance Corporation is the main supervising institution. As of 1 January 2021, the applicable premium rate, including long-term care insurance, is approximately 7.65% of the monthly wages (currently capped at a monthly contribution of KRW 7,047,900 in total, subject to change in 2022); split equally between employers and employees at approximately 3.825% each. The employee contributions to the NHI program are deductible in calculating taxable income. The national government provides 14% of the total amount of funding and the tobacco surcharges account for 6% of the funding. The total expenditure on health insurance as a percentage of gross domestic product has increased from 4.0% in 2000 to 7.1% in 2014.

The National Health Insurance Corporation, which is overseen by the Ministry of Health and Welfare, is responsible for providing healthcare through the National Health Insurance Service. South Koreans are required to contribute to the NHIS through payroll taxes to insure themselves and their dependants. An average of 5% of payroll is deducted out of employees' monthly incomes, divided between the employee and the employer. The self-employed are required to pay contributions through taxes based on their income level. Low-income households unable to pay National Health Insurance contributions receive health insurance through the Medical Aid Program. It is funded jointly by the central government and local governments, and local governments select the beneficiaries.

In 2014, total health expenditure per capita was $2,531, compared to a global average of $1058, and government expenditure on health per capita was $1368.

According to an NHIS survey, 77% of the population have private insurance. This is due to the fact that the national health plan covers at most 60% of each medical bill.

=== Increased usage of healthcare ===
The introduction of health insurance resulted in a significant surge in the utilization of healthcare services among individuals. Between 1977 and 2009, there was a substantial growth in the duration of hospital admissions per insured person, rising from a maximum of 0.1 days to 1.91 days. Additionally, the number of days spent receiving outpatient care increased from 0.7 to 16.07. There was an expansion in medical facilities and an increase in the number of hospital beds, particularly in higher-tier medical institutions. However, when compared to the average figures for healthcare providers in Japan and OECD countries, there remains a gap in terms of the healthcare workforce available to the population. Additionally, there was a rapid increase in the availability of advanced medical devices, including a notable growth in the number of CT and MRI machines, which are considered state-of-the-art equipment. While the rise in advanced equipment signifies improvements in the Korean healthcare system, it also contributes to the soaring healthcare costs that cannot be overlooked. The implementation of a health insurance system has played a role in enhancing the overall health of the population, as indicated by various health indicators.

=== Low reimbursement rates ===
Every year, the government engages in negotiations with medical professional organizations to determine the extent of the increase in medical treatment fees. Healthcare practitioners argue that South Korea's medical fees are insufficient when compared to other OECD countries, and the fees reimbursed by the government do not cover the cost of services. This debate concerning medical fees and reimbursement has persisted for several years. Virtually, medical fees have been controlled strictly by the government and remain at a fraction of the prices in the United States, and cheaper than those in China and Singapore.

South Korea has an insurance system with low reimbursement rates which encourages high turnover by hospitals and does little to dissuade patients from seeking second opinions. Health finance system in South Korea is characterized as "low premiums, low medical consultation fees, low pay". The medical policy not to give adequate payment and working condition to medical workers caused shortage of medical workers in some specialties, such as pediatrics, because these specialties involve underpaid treatments which is due to involvement with National Health Insurance. National Health Insurance, setting low medical fees and relying on medical workers' workforce, made medical workers in these specialties overworked but underpaid.

When the government broadens the range of health insurance benefits, healthcare facilities tend to offer uninsured services, due to low insurance benefit payment. The cost of healthcare services covered by insurance only amounts to 87% of the original cost. Consequently, healthcare institutions suffer financial losses when providing services covered by insurance. Among OECD countries, South Korea has a notably low proportion of active nurses. Despite a steady increase in the overall number of nurses, the expected growth in the number of active nurses has not been realized due to persistent turnover issues.

=== Deterioration of low-fee specialties ===
Pediatric care relies especially on volume to compensate for its low fees. Decades of declining birth rates have discouraged South Korean doctors from entering what they fear to be a field without a future. The number of pediatric facilities in Seoul fell by 12.5 percent between 2018 and 2022, compared to an increase of 76.8 percent for psychiatry clinics and a 41.2 percent rise for anesthesiology centers. Conditions such as overcrowded waiting rooms and a shortage of hospital beds have led to the death of at least one child. The difficulty in obtaining pediatric care is causing many South Korean couples to reconsider having babies.

Since the 1990s, there have been significant improvements in neonatal intensive care in Korea; however, there remains a deficiency in both facilities and equipment within NICUs. 71.1% of the required beds for neonatal intensive care are available, and the distribution of mechanical ventilators to NICUs capable of handling such care is inadequate. The shortage of doctors results in a high patient-to-doctor ratio, while nurses face the challenge of caring for 7.7 patients each, making it difficult to provide sufficient intensive care. Insufficient investment by hospitals is identified as the root cause, stemming from inadequate reimbursement through health insurance.

The healthcare infrastructure for childbirth has deteriorated, which can be attributed to a reduction in the number of maternity hospitals, compounded by financial difficulties resulting from inadequate medical fee reimbursements for childbirth. The situation is further exacerbated by a shortage of skilled obstetricians capable of providing expert care during childbirth. Additionally, significant legal pressures have discouraged promising medical students from pursuing careers in obstetrics and gynecology, contributing to an aging and imbalanced gender distribution within these professions.

== Hospitals ==
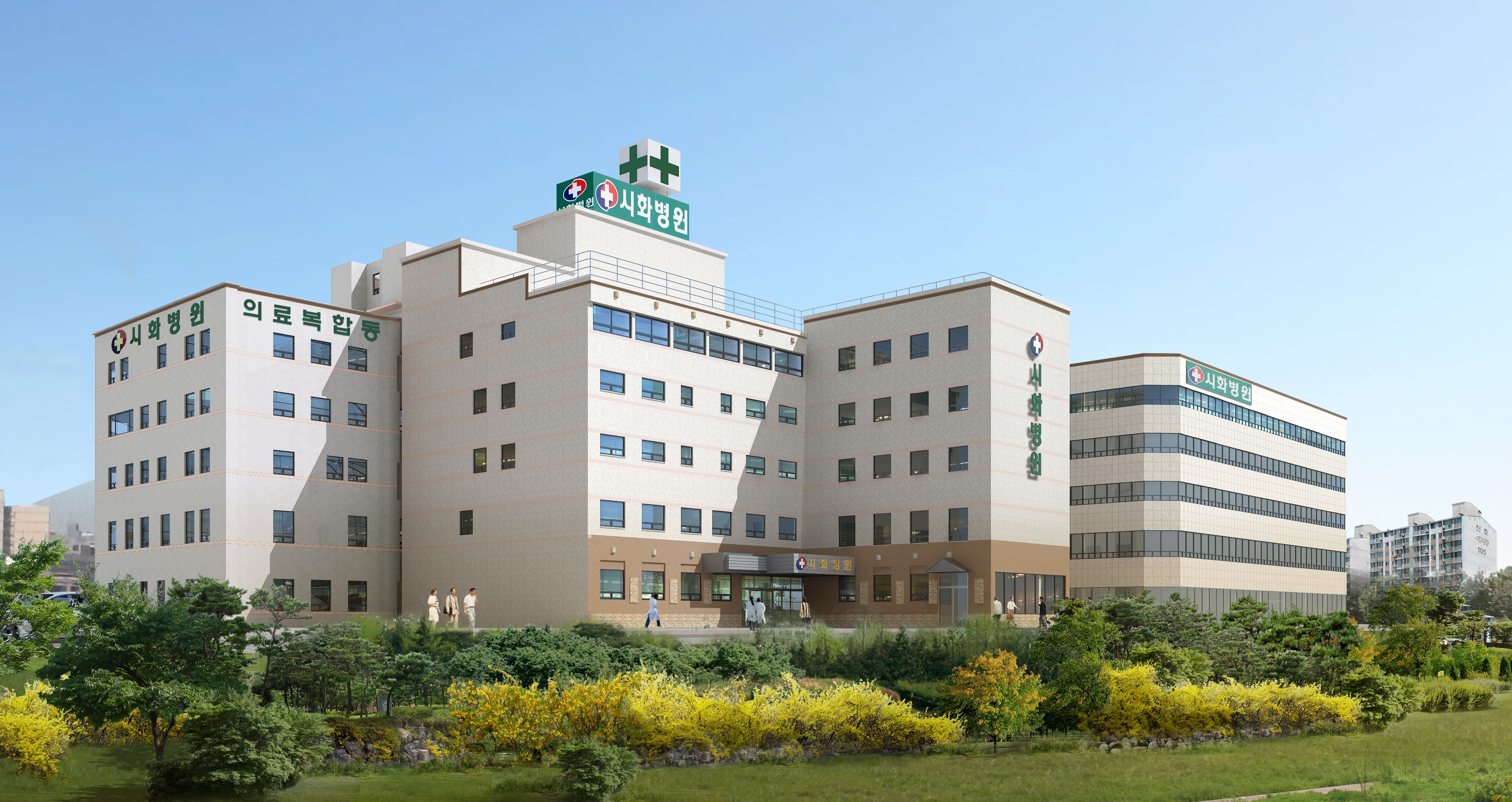
Sihwa Hospital in Gyeonggi-do

The number of hospital beds per 1000 population is 10, well above the OECD countries' average of 5. According to Mark Britnell hospitals dominate the health system. 94% of hospitals (88% of beds) are privately owned. 30 of the 43 tertiary hospitals are run by private universities. 10 more are run by publicly owned universities. Payment is made on a fee-for-service basis. There is no direct government subsidy for hospitals. This encourages hospitals to expand and discourages community services.

The Korea International Medical Association has been formed to encourage medical tourism. Nearly 400,000 medical tourists visited South Korea in 2013, a number which was projected to rise to 1 million by 2020. Compared to procedures done in the US, patients can save between 30 and 85% if they have the treatment in South Korea. It has been reported that some South Korean hospitals charge foreign patients more than local patients due to customized service such as translation and airport pickup. As a result, some medical tourists have complained that this is unfair.

== See also ==
- Health in South Korea
- LGBTQI health in South Korea
- Mental health in South Korea
- Suicide in South Korea
- Aging of South Korea
- List of hospitals in South Korea
- International rankings of South Korea#Health & Safety
