= Pohang Wooridul Hospital =

Hospital in South Korea

Pohang Wooridul Hospital is a medical institution designated by North Gyeongsang Province, South Korea, in 2016 and the first hospital in Pohang to be certified as a medical institution by the Ministry of Health and Welfare in 2013. It specialises in spinal therapy and research.

== Scale of facilities ==
Number of beds - 95 beds
Medical personnel – 91
Operation of a foreign sub-specialty fellowship training course (neurosurgery, orthopedics)
Host of Asia-MISS (minimally invasive spine surgery
Operation of a Society for Minimally Invasive Spinal Surgery Program (didactic course)

== Specialized medical technology ==
Percutaneous endoscopic lumbar discectomy
Percutaneous endoscopic cervical discectomy

== Programs and services ==
Cervical

Percutaneous endoscopic cervical discectomy
Anterior cervical discectomy and fusion

Thoracic

Percutaneous endoscopic thoracic discectomy
Lumber
Percutaneous and open spine surgery
