= Kwon Deok-cheol =

South Korean politician (born 1961)

- 권덕철
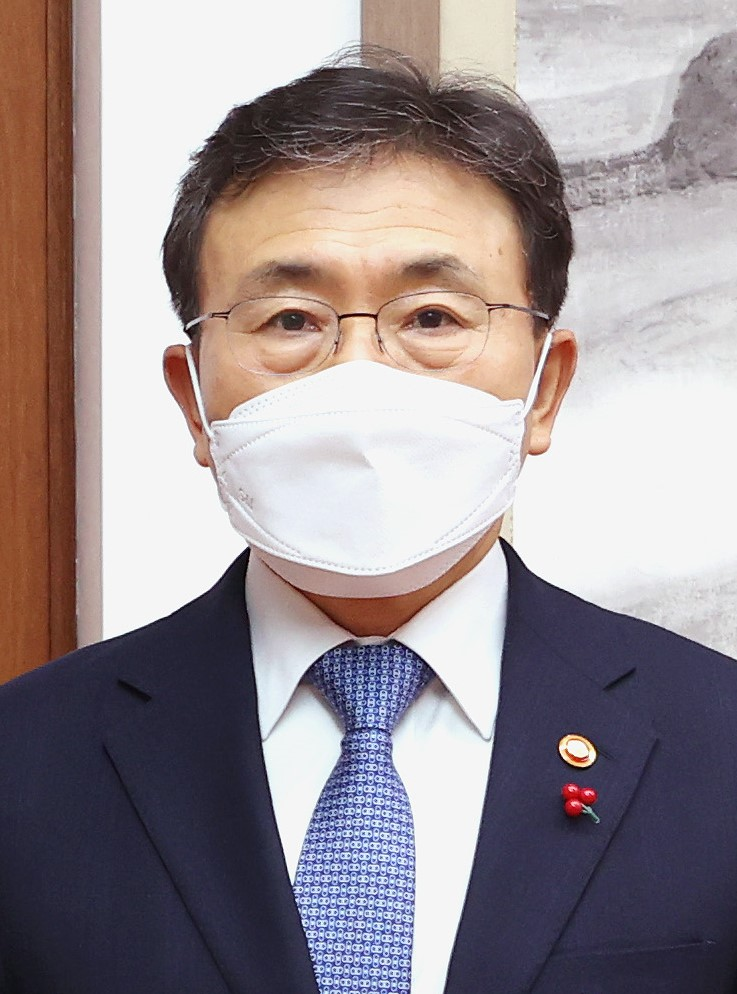
- Kwon Deok-cheol in 2020

Minister of Health and Welfare
- In office 24 December 2020 – 25 May 2022
- President: Moon Jae-in
- Preceded by: Park Neung-hoo
- Succeeded by: Cho Kyoo-hong

Vice Minister of Health and Welfare
- In office 7 June 2017 – 23 May 2019
- President: Moon Jae-in
- Minister: Park Neung-hoo
- Preceded by: Bang Moon-kyu
- Succeeded by: Kim Ganglip

Director of the Korea Health Industry Development Institute
- In office 19 September 2019 – 16 December 2020
- Preceded by: Lee Young-chan
- Succeeded by: Vacant

Personal details
- Born: 22 March 1961 (age 65) Namwon, North Jeolla, South Korea
- Party: Independent
- Education: Sungkyunkwan University; German University of Administrative Sciences, Speyer
- Occupation: Government official

Kwon Deok-cheol (Korean: 권덕철, born 22 March 1961) is a South Korean government official served as the Minister of Health and Welfare under President Moon Jae-in from 2020 to 2022. He previously served as the deputy head of the ministry from 2017 to 2019.

== Early life and education ==
Kwon was born in Namwon, North Jeolla in 1961. After being graduated from Jeolla High School in 1979, he attended Sungkyunkwan University to take Bachelor in Public Administration. He then flew to Germany and studied at German University of Administrative Sciences, Speyer, where he obtained a master's degree and a doctorate in public administration.

== Career ==
After being qualified for the Public Administration Examination in 1987, he started his career as the Secretary of the Ministry of Health and Society in 1989, then the Ministry of Health and Welfare. He served several positions within the ministry, such as the Director-General for Planning and Budget, Director-General for Financial Planning, Director General for Childcare Policy, Director General for Welfare Policy, Director of Health and Medical Policy, Assistant Minister for Planning and Coordination, and Deputy Minister.

In 2013, the Korea Medical Association led strikes against the then Park Geun-hye government's healthcare privatisation and telemedicine. Kwon led a negotiation with the trade union to stop the strikes. During the MERS outbreak in 2015, he was the Director of Health and Medical Policy and therefore was in charge of curbing the outbreak, along with Jeong Eun-kyeong.

On 6 June 2017, Kwon was appointed the Vice Minister of Health and Welfare by the President Moon Jae-in. As the Vice Minister, he was in charge of fulfilling Moon's healthcare policies, known as "Moon Jae-in Care". His term was ended on 23 May 2019, approximately 23 months after the appointment. This made him as the longest-serving person to hold the position. On 19 September, he was appointed the Director of the Korea Health Industry Development Institute (KHIDI).

On 4 December 2020, Kwon was nominated the new Minister of Health and Welfare, replacing the incumbent Park Neung-hoo. Therefore, his tenure as the Director of the KHIDI was ended on 16 December. He was officially appointed to the position on 24 December.

== Controversy ==
On 20 December 2020, 4 days before his appointment, a KHIDI report submitted to a People Power MP Jo Myung-hee revealed that Kwon was in the United Arab Emirates on a business trip from 25 to 29 October. As he had already returned to South Korea in the afternoon of 29 October, he was supposed to fulfill a 2-week self-quarantine until the noon of 12 November. However, he had joined the Healthcare Innovation Forum 2020 that was held at The Westin Chosun Seoul from 9am on 12 November, just few hours before his quarantine ended. The report has also revealed that he was wearing a face mask at the official meeting, but not while talking with others and taking photos. Jo, who had received the report, criticised his action, but he replied that he was exempted from the quarantine due to diplomatic reasons. He also gave a feedback that he was already tested negative for the COVID-19 before the exemption.
