= Pharmaceutical Affairs Law =

Pharmaceutical Affairs Law or Pharmaceutical Affairs Act may refer to:

- Pharmaceutical Affairs Law (Japan)
- Pharmaceutical Affairs Law (South Korea)
- Pharmaceutical Affairs Law (Taiwan)
