= LGBTQ health in South Korea =

South Korean geographic territory covered by the rainbow flag

The health access and health vulnerabilities experienced by the lesbian, gay, bisexual, transgender, queer or questioning, intersex, asexual (LGBTQIA) community in South Korea are influenced by the state's continuous failure to pass anti-discrimination laws that prohibit discrimination based on sexual orientation and gender identity. The construction and reinforcement of the South Korean national subject, "kungmin," and the basis of Confucianism and Christian churches perpetuates heteronormativity, homophobia, discrimination, and harassment towards the LGBTQI community. The minority stress model can be used to explain the consequences of daily social stressors, like prejudice and discrimination, that sexual minorities face that result in a hostile social environment. Exposure to a hostile environment can lead to health disparities within the LGBTQI community, like higher rates of depression, suicide, suicide ideation, and health risk behavior. Korean public opinion and acceptance of the LGBTQI community have improved over the past two decades, but change has been slow, considering the increased opposition from Christian activist groups. In South Korea, obstacles to LGBTQI healthcare are characterized by discrimination, a lack of medical professionals and medical facilities trained to care for LGBTQI individuals, a lack of legal protection and regulation from governmental entities, and the lack of medical care coverage to provide for the health care needs of LGBTQI individuals. The presence of Korean LGBTQI organizations is a response to the lack of access to healthcare and human rights protection in South Korea. It is also important to note that research that focuses on Korean LGBTQI health access and vulnerabilities is limited in quantity and quality as pushback from the public and government continues.

== Access to healthcare ==
International organizations like the United Nations and the World Health Organization call for equity and access to medical health services free of discrimination based on sexual orientation or gender identity, ensuring the dignity and the human rights of LGBTQI individuals. Where the state fails to provide care and resources, Korean LGBTQI organizations push for change and provide the necessary care.

=== Transition-related healthcare ===
Access to transition-related healthcare is a crucial determinant of the quality life of transgender individuals, in which access can mean alleviating gender dysphoria and improving their physical and mental health. A South Korean nationwide cross-sectional survey found that transgender adults face barriers to transition-related healthcare. These include the cost of procedures, lack of access to healthcare needs, and discrimination by healthcare professionals.

The primary barrier to transitional-related healthcare is the cost of procedures like hormone therapy and sex reassignment surgery, as the national health insurance does not cover it. For instance, participants reported spending 250,000-490,000 KRW for a Gender Identity Disorder diagnosis or 15,148,000 KRW for transfeminine and 20,571,000 KRW for transmasculine individuals and genital reconstruction surgery. Transgender Koreans also face a financial burden resulting from the hardship of finding and maintaining a career due to societal stigma revolving around medical transition. Similarly, some face opposition to their medical transition from family and friends.

There are few healthcare professionals with education and transition-related healthcare training as Korean medical schools do not have a medical transition in their curriculum. As of early 2022, the only general hospital with an LGBTQ+ Center openly displaying their services and doctors supporting the LGBTQ+ is Kangdong Sacred Heart Hospital. Limited access to healthcare resources complicates transgender individual's process of changing their legal gender identity. Transgender or non-conforming individuals' physical appearance must conform to the norm of their preferred gender, following South Korean binarism to change their legal gender identity. There are also instances where sterilization is required for legal gender change. Not conforming to the gender binary by undergoing GID diagnosis, hormonal therapy, and sex reassignment surgery means losing citizen rights. Without legal gender change, a trans woman cannot be exempt from military service, and a transgender man cannot participate in military service.

Prejudice and discrimination of healthcare professionals is a significant factor of why transgender people did not seek transition-related healthcare. Transgender or non-conforming participants in the study also reported having been denied healthcare services. The lack of legal protection also affects LGBTQI individual's ability to "raise objection even in cases of medical malpractice, and especially in cases of female to male genital reconstruction surgery, can expect nothing but entirely unsatisfactory results."

These obstacles threaten transgender individual's access to healthcare. Implementing programs that provide transition-related healthcare services training to Korean healthcare providers, and providing national health insurance coverage of transition-related procedures will directly improve the health access of transgender people. Increasing research on the experiences and health barriers transgender people face can also potentially improve health access conditions.

=== Mental healthcare ===
Coupled with South Korean stigma surrounding mental healthcare, LGBTQI individuals in South Korea must also account for the lack of anti-discrimination laws that prevent discrimination from psychologists and medical professionals. LGBTQI Koreans risk being recommended or forced to undergo conversion therapy as a proposed way to cure their homosexuality. The government established counseling hotlines like Youth Hotline 1388 for sexual minority youth, which resulted in failure considering counseling professionals in the hotline used heteronormative rhetoric and encouragement to pursue conversion therapy rather than choosing to live as a sexual minority. The following organizations are responsible for the creation of centers and programming that concerns LGBTQI mental health and wellness in response to the lack of government-sponsored resources for LGBTQI mental health care despite limits and constraints due to a lack of economic resources. These organizations provide an inclusive, safe environment to LGBTQI Koreans that face mental health needs like depression and suicide.

==== Chingusai (친구사이) ====
Korean Gay Men's Human Rights Group Chingusai ("Between Friends") is an organization mobilizes to ensure LGBTQI human rights and protect LGBTQI individuals from discrimination. Chingusai also provides counseling programming to promote acceptance within families and teachers. Chingusai established "마음연결" (Heart Connection), a suicide prevention helpline in response to the high rate of suicide and suicide ideation within LGBTQI youth. The use of the forum is open to all ages, and individuals can reach out anonymously. Heart Connection guarantees professional counselor response within 48 hours. Dr. Park Jae-wan, a night volunteer for the Heart Connection helpline, states that those who reach out "usually talk about feeling alienated, isolated, feeling like they are a burden to someone."

==== Dding Dong (띵동) ====
Dding Dong, an LGBTQ Youth Crisis Support Center, provides LGBTQI youth with support and protection to "confront crisis circumstances and guide them to live an independent life guaranteed of physical and mental well-being and self-esteem on one's sexual orientation and gender identity." Dding Dong provides emergency living expenses, living goods support (underwear, socks, condoms, sanitary napkins, hygiene products, and toiletries), shelter connection, and a place to live. The center is prepared to provide support for LGBTQI individuals with psychological trauma, family trauma, and suicide crisis.

==== Korean Lesbian Counseling Center (한국레즈비언상담소) ====
The Korea Lesbian Counseling Center caters to the needs of the Korean lesbian community. It rejects the prescribed notions of what a woman is or should be including the dichotomy of femininity and masculinity. The Korean Lesbian Counseling Center provides telephone and online counseling. The center focuses on cultivating self-esteem and provide victims of violence and discrimination a space to heal.

=== HIV/AIDS healthcare ===
South Korea took an aggressive response to high HIV/AIDS cases in the late 1980s through the implementation of the Aids Prevention Act, which investigated and tested individuals suspected to be "high risk," gay men and sex workers. The government used more than 60% of its HIV/AIDS budget on testing. In 1996, only 1 for every 58,000 individuals tested resulted in HIV/AIDS positive, showing the failure of the high volume of testing. The failure was due to the change in transmission pattern, most HIV/AIDS transmission was previously through contact with foreigners, and transmission after that 1990s is attributed to domestic sexual contacts. HIV/AIDS within the gay community increased after the 1990s. Despite the shift in transmission patterns, the South Korean government continued with HIV policy that implemented medical consideration through high volume testing and aggressive supervision of individuals that tested positive. The KCDCP's reported that from the years 1985 to 2011, 80.9% of HIV infections were transmitted through sex, and 32% were transmitted through "homosexual contact." Regardless, the South Korean government remained reluctant to implement policies that considered sexuality and "sexual health promotion, empowerment and self-reliance, and community-oriented HIV/AIDS."

Individuals living with HIV/AIDS experience prejudice, discrimination, and human rights violations when they seek medical care. One way is through South Korea's continued HIV testing of individuals suspected of being "high risk" enabled by the AIDS Prevention Act. Findings from "The People Living with HIV Stigma Index In South Korea 2016-2017" found that 61.5% of participants were unknowingly tested, most during non-related medical procedures. The HIV Stigma Index also found that learning about one's positive HIV status abruptly is a traumatic experience. Only 11.5% received "pre- and post-HIV test counseling," and 42.3% did not receive counseling. Human rights activists have called for the end of the AIDS Prevention Act and its replacement with the HIV/AIDS Victims Human Rights Act. The HIV/AIDS Victims Human Rights Act would "prohibit HIV testing without proper consent, punish offenders of discrimination and those who disclose the identity of those living with HIV/AIDS, and require firms, schools, and medical professionals to have human rights education." However, no change was enacted by the government, which the government justified by stating that the public feared people living with HIV/AIDS.

People living with HIV/AIDS face discrimination by medical professionals and both general and municipal hospitals that refuse to treat people living with HIV/AIDS. Medical professionals and hospitals often turn away HIV/AIDS patients and face no consequences due to discriminatory actions. Hospitals that do accept people living with aids separate them into different wards, where they must use different showers and bathroom facilities from general patients. In doing so, the hospital and medical professionals continue to spread misinformation that HIV/AIDS is a contagious disease and can be transmitted with contact. Activists denounce the Korea Centers for Disease Control and Prevention (KCDCP) for negligence, as the country does not have statistics on how patients with AIDS are cared for or which are close to death, they only collect how many live with aids. While the government provided free care for most HIV/AIDS patients, most received treatment too late.

HIV/AIDS patients also risk violations of human rights, including rape, refusal of requests for medical attention, and negligent death. An investigation found that Sudong Yonsei Sanitarium Hospital, the designated HIV/AIDS hospice, had concealed years of human rights abuse (since 2011) through threats to the patients. Only some Sudong Yonsei Sanitarium Hospital patients living with AIDS were transferred to other medical centers, others were displaced. Activists reported that hospitals and medical centers would not allow visits or answer questions on how long AIDS patients will be allowed to stay or what treatment they would receive, highlighting the lack of transparency from governmental entities and care facilities.

Organizations like Ivan Stop HIV/AIDS Project (iSHAP), funded by the Ministry of Health, provide prevention education, counseling, and offers free HIV tests and is run by sexual minority employees. However, there is mistrust of government programs like iSHAP, as a study focusing on the distribution of condoms found that the program's distribution of condoms was a "reconfirmation of abnormality by the state" than for the promotion of safe sex practices within the gay community. In contrast, organizations like Dding Dong, Chingusai, and other LGBTQI centers provide LGBTQI individuals with resources that focus on HIV/AIDS preventative care. For instance, the Dding Dong offers medical consultation, HIV testing, HIV prevention courses, human rights education, and free condoms and gels. Dding Dong also offers specific counseling and support to LGBTQI individuals living with aids.

== Health disparities ==
Discrimination, societal stigma, and violence are stressors that contribute to mental health problems within the LGBTQI community, leading to depression, suicide, suicide ideation, and health risk behavior. The National Human Rights Commission of Korea survey, conducted in 2014, found that of the LGBTQI respondents that experienced discrimination and harassment, "58.1% had experienced depression, 46.2% had experienced a decrease in the motivation to learn, 19.4% had attempted suicide, and 16.1% had attempted self-harm, respectively."

=== Depression ===
Depression is a significant health disparity between South Korean sexual minorities and heterosexual counterparts. The prevalence of depression can be attributed to the psychological stress caused by the persistent experience of exclusion and discrimination. Lesbian and gay sexual minorities have the highest rate of awareness of depression, followed by bisexual sexual minorities and last, non-sexual minorities.

Men who have sex with men (MSM) have a higher rate of depression than the general male population. Perceived depression for MSM was 42.7% compared to 7.4% among general men. The higher rate of depression within the MSM population is attributed partially to the "social hostility, stigma, and discrimination toward homosexuality." "Coming out" negatively affected MSM's stress, suicide ideation and attempts, and depression, worsened by the lack of social support when coming out. Stress and depression of MSM who involuntarily came out (outed) had an increased risk of stress, depression, and suicidal ideation.

Similarly, sexual minority youth (SMY) have higher rates of depression in response to psychological stress from "coming out" and family, friends, and classmates exclusion. Sexual minority youth consequently tend to have "low social and psychological self-esteem and high depression levels when compared to other student groups."

=== Suicide ===
In South Korea, LGBTQI people are at higher risk of committing suicide. The perception of not belonging is a factor contributing to an increased risk of suicide within the LGBTQI community. According to the Korea Societal Integration Survey, under half of the South Korea population express, they do not want any form of acquaintance with gay individuals. High exposure to discrimination and harassment also increases the risk of suicide within LGBTQI individuals. As reported by the National Human Rights Commission of Korea, "92% of LGBTQI people were worried about becoming the target of hate crimes."

Suicide attempts by sexual minority youth reach 20%-40%, five to six times higher than non-sexual minority youth. The Korean Gay Men's Human Rights Group Chingusai conducted a social needs survey in 2014 that found that of the LGBTQI youth (aged 18 or below), 45.7% had attempted suicide, and 53.3% attempted self-harmed. LGBTQI youth participants reported having experienced discrimination and harassment in school and consequently missed school, withdrew, or transferred schools. 80.0% experienced hate speech from teachers, and 92.0% experienced hate speech from other students. Some LGBTQI students reported having been forced to give up school activities by teachers and students.

Another study found "gay men were 14 times more likely to attempt suicide than heterosexual men, and 18% of lesbians reported suicidal attempts in the past" which is closely related to discrimination and oppression they face.

=== Suicide ideation ===
Perceived burdensomeness is an important identifier of suicide ideation. Studies imply that perceived burdensomeness could lead to suicidal ideation, independent of other related factors. LGBTQI perceived burdensomeness is strongly influenced by South Korean collectivism attitudes and strong Confucianism values that promote heterosexual marriage and having children as a good citizen. South Korean "low tolerance toward differences in sexual orientation" results in perceived burdensomeness to family and nation. Concerns to come out to family may result in a strong predictor of suicidal ideation.

Yi et al. study on "Health disparities between lesbian, gay, and bisexual adults and the general population in South Korea: Rainbow Connection Project I" found that suicide ideation within Korean lesbian, gay, and bisexual adults was higher than that of the general population. Lesbian prevalence of suicide ideation was 6.25 times higher, and bisexual men's suicide ideations was 10.93 times higher than the general population, which is alarming considering that suicide is a leading cause of death in South Korea.

=== Health risk behavior ===
An analysis from the Korean Nationwide Survey that focused on Korean youth in grades 7 to 12 compared the health risk behavior between heterosexual and gay and lesbian youth. This survey found that substance and alcohol use, smoking, and abnormal weight loss was more prevalent in gay and lesbian youth. The study attributes the health risk behavior to the "stigma and prejudices against sexual minorities in society and feelings of marginalization lead to psychological distress." For instance; smoking was three times higher for gay youth and six times greater for lesbian youth compared to heterosexual youth.

Similarly, a study by Kim et al. found that gay, lesbian, and bisexual youth tend to engage in sexually risky behavior compared to heterosexual youth. These include an increased likelihood of having sex after drinking alcohol, which was seen highest in the bisexual youth, followed by gay and lesbian youth. The analysis found that gay and lesbian youth reported higher condom use as well as experiences with sexually transmitted diseases.

=== HIV/AIDS ===
South Korea has an estimated 13,000 people in Korea living with HIV/AIDS, with a large portion being LGBTQI individuals. (Kaleidoscope Human Rights Foundation with the assistance of DLA Piper International 2015) HIV/AIDS stigmatization and misinformation in South Korea continues, as depicted by comments made by a 2017 presidential election candidate, Hong Jun-Pyo, who claimed that "because of homosexuality there are over 14,000 AIDS cases in South Korea." A South Korean HIV/AIDS misconception is that it is a contagious disease that can be transmitted through touch. Misinformation and stigma in South Korea contribute to the exclusion and discrimination of people living with HIV/AIDS face. For instance, a survey found that people would refuse to be neighbors, share tables, let their children attend the same school, or care for family members with HIV/AIDS. Stigma and discrimination contribute to hesitation to willingly get tested for HIV which increases transmission risk. HIV/AIDS stigma also contributes to high suicide rates among HIV positive South Koreans. The suicide rate for individuals living with HIV/AIDS is 10 times higher than the general public, as reported by the National Human Rights Commission of South Korea, people living with HIV/AIDS.

Research on the experiences of LGBTQI individuals living with HIV/AIDS is limited due to limited resources and low government support. "The People Living with HIV Stigma Index In South Korea 2016-2017," for example, accounts for only 1% of the South Korean population living with HIV/AIDS. While the gay and men having sex with men (MSM) experiences with HIV in South Korea are well represented by the index, women, and transgender populations are not well represented. Participants in this index reported high levels of self-blame, guilt, low self-esteem due to their HIV status. 36.5% of respondents reported that they had suicidal thoughts.

HIV/AIDS research and data is lacking in South Korea, however, according to UN, generally, men who have sex with men (MSM) are "24 times more likely to acquire HIV than adults in the general population, while transgender people are 18 times more likely to acquire HIV than adults in the general population." The World Health Organization has also reported that MSM and transgender individuals have a higher risk of sexual transmission when there is unprotected anal sex.

== Conversion therapy ==
The use of conversion therapy as a means to change the sexual orientation or gender identity within the LGBTQI community persists despite South Korea's international commitment to abide by international human rights. International entities, like the United Nations, have called for the end of conversion therapy, as this practice violates human rights. Conversion therapy "is medically ineffective and has been proven by numerous studies to have the possibility of negatively impacting the mental health of LGBTI people."

An example of the continued use of conversion therapy in South Korea is seen in an instance where a counselor in the Youth Hotline1388 suggested undergoing to conversion therapy before deciding to live as a sexual minority during a counseling session on homosexuality, in which the youth came out to her mother as a lesbian. This situation gained the attention of LGBTQI organizations like the LGBTQ Youth Crisis Support Center DDing Dong, which denounced this action and problematized that the Youth Hotline 1388 falls under the Ministry of Gender Equality and Family and the Korea Youth Counseling & Welfare Institute. The Youth Hotline 1388 also revealed its portrayal of homosexuality as problematic and "a temporary inclination often experienced during adolescence," under the parent's guidebook, "Easy Guide on Sex." In 2015, the U.N. Human Rights Committee also called for South Korea to release an official statement condemning the "propagation of so-called 'conversion therapies.'"

A survey conducted by the Network for the Elimination of Conversion Therapy showed that of the participants that disclosed their sexual orientation and gender identity during their counseling experiences, 17.6% of them experienced conversion therapy. According to the results, 21.2% of the participants were told that their homosexuality could be cured. Participants would be recommended for conversion therapy, often by family, friends, and acquaintances. Most participants were forced to receive conversion therapy through a counseling specialist, religious persons, and psychiatrists, and in some cases, counseling and medical specialists. Of those participants that underwent conversion therapy, 65% state that conversion therapy had a harmful impact on their lives, including psychological damage and "destruction of self-esteem, communication breakdown, and outing."

Despite grassroots and international opposition to conversion therapy, there are religious groups that defend conversion therapy with the argument that "dehomosexualization" is a human right and claim there is a cure for sexual orientation. The South Korean government and the Ministry of Health and Welfare have yet to express their stance. However, conversion therapy events continue to be held in government buildings like the National Assembly building.

== Sex education ==
South Korea received international pressure from the UN Committee on the Rights of the Child to implement sexual education curriculum that includes topics on "pregnancy, HIV/AIDS, sexual orientation, and gender identity" to prevent a rise in HIV/AIDS infections and discrimination based on gender and sexuality. Yet, conservative and heteronormative South Korean standards of society present a challenge in establishing sex education for the LGBTQI community, as exemplified by the actions of the Ministry of Education. Despite the state requirement to provide sexual and reproductive health education for everyone, the "Nationwide Guideline for Sex Education Standards in School" continues to exclude and prohibit mention of LGBTQI experiences or homosexuality. The "Nationwide Guideline for Sex Education Standards in School" has "discriminatory language and standards that reinforce gender binarism." The Ministry of Education has also been responsible for the canceling sex-education training for teachers that included topics like LGBTQI human rights as the Ministry stated that it did not align with School Sex Education Standards. Additionally, due to the lack of governmental and institutional support, South Korean sexuality educators "fear discipline or parental backlash if they try to raise LGBT issues with students." Conservative restrictions and control over sex education policy result in youth seeking sex education outside formal education settings, like pornography, which can lead to unsafe sex practices like inconsistent use of condoms or using pulling out method. Implementation of an LGBTQI inclusive sex education curriculum could mean the prevention of STI or transmission of HIV/AIDS.

== Health care insurance benefits ==
In January 2022, a South Korean same-sex couple was refused health care insurance benefits by a lower court - because the spouse was "not of the opposite sex". The ruling is subject to a possible awaiting appeal in higher courts.

In February 2023 the Seoul High Court ruled that the state's health insurer should provide spousal coverage to a same-sex couple. The NHIS has said it will appeal the ruling to the Supreme Court.

== Relevant organizations ==
- DDing Dong
- Chingusai
- Korean Lesbian Consultation Center
- Korean Sexual Minority Culture and Rights Center

== See also ==
- LGBT rights in South Korea
- Suicidal ideation in South Korean LGBT youth
- LGBT rights in Asia
- Healthcare in South Korea
- Mental health in South Korea
