= Kim Gang-lip =

South Korean public official (born 1965)

- 김강립

Minister of Food and Drug Safety
- In office 2 November 2020 – 26 May 2022
- President: Moon Jae-in
- Prime Minister: Chung Sye-kyun; Kim Boo-kyum
- Preceded by: Lee Eui-kyung
- Succeeded by: Oh Yu-kyoung

Vice Minister of Health and Welfare
- In office 23 May 2019 – 1 November 2020
- President: Moon Jae-in
- Prime Minister: Lee Nak-yon; Chung Sye-kyun
- Preceded by: Kwon Deok-chul
- Succeeded by: Yang Seong-il; Kang Do-tae

Personal details
- Born: 9 November 1965 (age 60) Cheorwon County, South Korea
- Education: Yonsei University (LLB); University of Chicago

Kim Gang-lip (Korean: 김강립; Hanja: 金剛立; born 9 November 1965) is a South Korean government official served as Minister of Food and Drug Safety (MFDS) from 2020 to 2022 and Vice Minister of Health and Welfare (MOHW) from 2019 to 2020 under President Moon Jae-in.

After passing the state exam in 1990, Kim has dedicated his career in public service - mostly at MOHW. At MOHW, Kim led departments responsible for various policy areas spanning from public health to pension system. He also served as a counsellor at Permanent Mission of Korea in Geneva where WHO resides.

Upon beginning of President Moon's presidency in 2017, Kim was promoted to lead MOHW's Planning and Coordination Office, the most senior office in any ministries. He then led the MOHW as its vice minister before becoming Food and Drug Safety Minister in 2020 as part of vice minister reshuffle. Following the legislative amendment incurred by the pandemic which expanded the number of vice-minister of MOHW, Kim served as the last Vice Minister of MOHW and its first 1st Vice Minister. Since 2020 Kim sits as a member of the Executive Board of WHO.

He is widely known to the public for daily 11am briefing on COVID-19 virus containment he held while serving as the deputy head of MOHW.

In a MFDS, MOHW and KDCA's joint briefing to the president in January 2021, Kim reaffirmed that vaccine approval, which his ministry is responsible for, will be completed in February 2021. On 10 February 2021, Kim, on behalf of the ministry, announced the approval of Oxford–AstraZeneca COVID-19 vaccine for all adults which will be manufactured in South Korea by SK Bioscience's facility in Andong on the condition that the ministry receives a report of the third and last stage of its clinical trial.

In a YouTube-TV show, Giant Peng TV, Kim, then deputy head of Ministry of Health and Welfare, nicknamed himself "strong man."

Kim holds three degrees - a bachelor in sociology and a doctorate in welfare science from Yonsei University and a master's in social welfare policy from University of Chicago.
