= Lee Eui-kyung =

South Korean pharmacologist (born 1962)

- 이의경

Minister of Food and Drug Safety
- In office 9 March 2019 – 1 November 2020
- President: Moon Jae-in
- Prime Minister: Chung Sye-kyun
- Preceded by: Ryu Young-jin
- Succeeded by: Kim Ganglip

Personal details
- Born: 14 December 1962 (age 63) Seoul, South Korea
- Party: independent
- Education: Seoul National University; University of Iowa

Lee Eui-kyung (Korean: 이의경; born 14 December 1962) is a South Korean professor of pharmacy at Sungkyunkwan University who has previously served as President Moon Jae-in's Minister of Food and Drug Safety from 2019 to 2020.

== Education ==
Lee holds three degrees in pharmacy: Bachelor and Master's from Seoul National University and Ph.D. from University of Iowa.

== Career ==
Lee is widely regarded as the first generation social pharmacology expert of South Korea. She developed career in pharmacy at universities and government-funded research institutions. From 1999 she has served as a member of Central Advisory Committee on Pharmaceutical Affairs. After working as a research director at Korea Institute for Health and Social Affairs for over fifteen years, Lee taught at Graduate School of Clinical Pharmacy at Sookmyung Women's University from 2006 to 2012 during which she served as a vice-chair of Korean Association of Health Technology Assessment, president and Korean Academy of Social and Managed Care Pharmacy. From 2010 she is leading Korea Regional Chapter of International Society For Pharmacoeconomics Outcomes Research. She continued teaching at School of Pharmacy at Sungkyunkwan University as an associate professor from 2012 and professor from 2015. In 2013 she was elected as the third president of Korean Association of Health Technology Assessment.

In an interview, Lee revealed that she had never met President Moon in person and has no knowledge of who recommended her appointment.
