= Park Neung-hoo =

South Korean politician (born 1956)

- 박능후
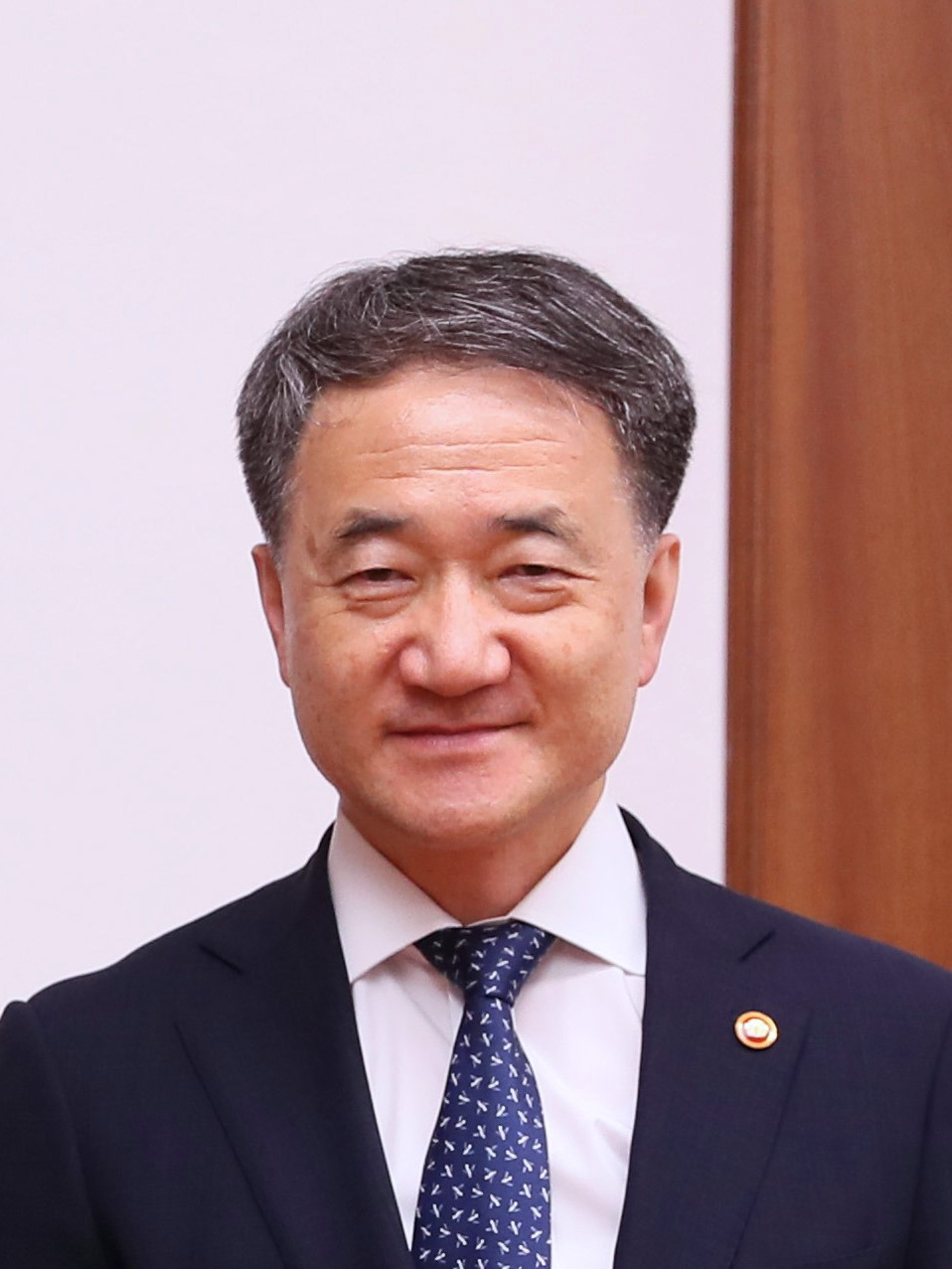

Minister of Health and Welfare
- In office 22 July 2017 – 24 December 2020
- President: Moon Jae-in
- Preceded by: Chung Chin-youb
- Succeeded by: Kwon Deok-cheol

Personal details
- Born: 24 June 1956 (age 70) Haman, South Gyeongsang Province, South Korea
- Party: Independent
- Education: Seoul National University; University of California, Berkeley
- Occupation: Professor

- Park Neung-hoo
- Hangul: 박능후
- Hanja: 朴淩厚
- RR: Bak Neunghu
- MR: Pak Nŭnghu

Park Neung-hoo (Korean: 박능후; born 24 June 1956) is a South Korean professor of social welfare at Kyonggi University previously served as President Moon Jae-in's first Minister of Health and Welfare from 2017 to 2020. Park was a leading figure combating the spread of coronavirus in South Korea.

Park studied the issue of poverty and social welfare for over three decades in academia. With his appointment, President Moon completed formation of his first cabinet in 2017. As of 2020, he is leading one of three ministries in which the head has not changed since Moon's presidency began, along with Minister of Land, Infrastructure and Transport Kim Hyun-mee and Foreign Minister Kang Kyung-wha.

== Education ==
Park graduated from Seoul National University with a Bachelor of Arts in Economics and a Master of Arts in political science. In 1998, he earned a PhD in social welfare from the University of California, Berkeley.

In 2020 he received The Elise and Walter A. Haas International Award.

== Controversy ==
On December 2, 2019, Health Minister Park made controversial remarks on a child-on-child sexual abuse case in which a five-year-old girl was sexually abused by another five-year-old boy. Park said that it was "natural behavior over the stages of development", appearing to side with the perpetrator, causing a public outcry. The Korean Ministry of Health and Welfare apologized to the victim, her family and others hurt by Park's remarks, on behalf of the minister.

On February 26, 2020, Park Neung-hoo's remarks caused controversy when he blamed South Korean nationals for the spreading the COVID-19 coronavirus, saying that "the biggest cause is us Koreans who entered from China". Park also claimed that the Korean Society of Infectious Diseases had not suggested an entry ban on infected countries, which was incorrect. Opposition lawmakers suggested that President Moon Jae-in fire Park as a result.

Political offices
Preceded by Chung Chin-youb	Minister of Health and Welfare; 2017-present	Incumbent
