= Kim Ji-hoo =

South Korean model and actor (1985–2008)

- 김지후
- Undated picture of Kim
- Born: April 5, 1985; Seoul, South Korea
- Died: October 6, 2008 (aged 23); Seoul, South Korea
- Occupations: Actor; model
- Years active: 2007–2008
- Known for: Cyberbullying and homophobia in South Korea, as well as for causing intensified debate over suicide in the country

Kim Ji-hoo (Korean: 김지후; April 5, 1985 – October 6, 2008) was a South Korean actor and model whose suicide brought attention to discrimination against LGBTQ+ people in South Korea as well as to the issue of suicide in the country, with many notable cases in the weeks preceding Kim's death and after, including that of former President Roh Moo-hyun in May 2009.

== Career and suicide ==
Born in 1985 in Seoul, Kim began a career as a model in 2007, appearing that year in the MBC TV sitcom High Kick! and the drama series Before and After: Plastic Surgery Clinic, also broadcast on MBC. In 2008, he took part of the reality program Coming Out on tvN Story, where he publicly came out as a gay man. After stating that he was gay, many TV programs and fashion shows cancelled Kim's participation, and his agency severed ties with him. He also received numerous hateful messages on his personal blog, with the commenters denouncing his sexual orientation.

According to his mother's testimony to police after his death, Kim suffered from professional and personal difficulties following his coming out, with fellow actor Hong Seok-cheon, who is also gay, saying that he too suffered from similar discrimination for being gay. On October 6, 2008, police in Jamsil-dong found Kim dead in his home. A spokesperson for Songpa District Police said that they believed that Kim had killed himself. Two days later, on October 8, a Songpa police officer confirmed that Kim had committed suicide by hanging. He left a suicide note expressing that he was going through difficulties and asking to be cremated.

== Reaction ==
Along the statements of Kim's mother and actor Hong reassuring that Kim had suffered heavily from homophobic harassment, the Songpa Police Department said that his suicide "reflected public prejudice towards gay people and their difficulty in succeeding in the entertainment industry." Kim's suicide was the fourth in a series of suicides of entertainers, which included Jang Chae-won, who was a trans woman, actor Ahn Jae-hwan, and actress Choi Jin-sil. Kim's and the other three entertainers' suicides fueled debate in South Korea and among its netizens about cyberbullying and suicide in the country. The issue and debate resurfaced months later upon the death of former President Roh Moo-hyun, who jumped to his death in May 2009.
