= Mental health in South Korea =

Over the past few decades, mental health has become an increasingly serious issue in health in South Korea. A 2021 survey conducted by the Ministry of Health and Welfare found that 32.7% of males and 22.9% of females in South Korea developed symptoms of mental illness at least one time in their lives. Suicide in South Korea is the most frequent cause of death for people aged 9 to 24. Mental health issues are most common among the elderly and adolescents.

Since the late 1990s, South Korea has been enacting policies to address societal mental health challenges. These efforts increased into the late 2000s and 2010s, but a number of studies have suggested they have not significantly reduced the prevalence of such concerns. One significant challenge is that these efforts are consistently found to be underutilized. A number of proposed explanations exist for this underutilization, including societal stigma due to Korean Confucianist concerns over losing face, lack of understanding about the symptoms of mental illness, and low awareness of what resources are available.

== History ==
Prior to the late 19th century, medical care was often administered via traditional Korean medicine and Korean shamanistic medicine. Western medicine was first introduced to South Korea by missionary doctors during the late Joseon and Korean Empire periods. During the 1910–1945 Japanese colonial period, mental hospitals were sponsored by the Japanese government. Missionary hospitals also operated during this period.

In the 1990s, economic hardship during the Asian financial crisis led to a sharp increase in mental illness and suicide in South Korea, as well as almost all other Asian countries that the economic depression affected.

The 2019 and ongoing COVID-19 pandemic has been found in a number of studies to have globally exacerbated mental health issues.

In 2021, a survey conducted by the Ministry of Health and Welfare found that 32.7% of males and 22.9% of females in South Korea developed symptoms of mental illness at least one time in their lives.

== Description ==
=== Depression ===
In 2001, between 3 and 4.2 percent of the South Korean population was estimated to have major depressive disorder as outlined in the DSM-IV, a number which has been increasing. In 2011, the estimated proportion of people with diagnosed depression was 6.7%. Women, smokers, shift workers, those with poor health, those who exercise in the evenings, those who perceive their lives to be stressful, and those that were underweight were more likely to have major depressive disorder. A potential reason that this statistic has risen within the last decade could be from the low access rate to health care services for depression. A study reported that the average percent annual treatment rate for depression was 39.2%. Within the population of those diagnosed with depression, only 16.0% seek treatment. Among those in the population that seek treatment, individuals with a college education are more likely to undergo depression treatment, 16.0%, than those without an education. Educational level has been shown to have an association with those seeking treatment for depression; with more education, individuals are more exposed to health information and actively respond to this new knowledge. Individuals that are above the age of 70 are also less likely to receive depression consultation than those aged between 19 and 29 years.

=== Alcohol use disorder ===
Compared to other East Asian countries and the United States, alcohol use disorder is more prevalent in Korea, and treatment is four times less likely to be sought out in Korea. The 2009 Korea National Health and Nutrition Examination Survey found that less than 2% of those with alcohol use disorder had received any form of treatment or intervention by a professional. Kye-Song Lee found in a 2013 study that nearly 7% of South Koreans have alcohol use disorder, the highest rate of any country in the world. South Koreans drink more alcohol by volume per capita than the residents of any other country in the world, consuming twice as much alcohol and 1.5 times as much hard alcohol per person as Russians, the next highest consumers. The prevalence of alcohol use disorder is increased by the expectation of businesspeople to engage in heavy drinking with their colleagues after work. In addition to being seen as a method of bonding with friends and colleagues, drinking alcohol is also viewed as a method of stress-relief.

=== Other mental illness ===
Maeng-Je Cho et al. found that over one-third of the South Korean population has had a mental disorder at any point in their lives, and over one-fifth have experienced a disorder in the past year. 17% of the South Korean population has insomnia, which is a rate comparable to that of insomnia in the United States. 6.6% of Koreans have nicotine dependence disorder, 2% have a mood disorder, and 5.2% have an anxiety disorder, all of which are less frequent among Koreans than among Americans.

Post-traumatic stress disorder (PTSD) is especially prevalent among refugees from North Korea living in South Korea. In a 2005 study, Jeon et al. found that 29.5% of North Korean refugees in South Korea were found to suffer from PTSD. A higher rate was found among female refugees than male refugees.

=== Suicide ===
From 2011 to 2023, the leading cause of death for people between ages 9 to 24 was suicide. In 2013, the suicide rate in South Korea was 29.1 per 100,000, a decrease from 33.3 per 100,000 in 2011, but still more than twice the OECD average. Between 2000 and 2011, South Korea's suicide rate more than doubled, contrary to the international trend of a steadily decreasing suicide rate. In 2017, it was reported that South Korea had the 12th highest suicide rate in the world (4th highest for female cases) and the highest rate among the OECD counties. The OECD reported that in 2019, the rate of suicide was 24.6 per 100,000. This was a decrease from past reported years, but still higher among other listed countries, such as the United States, Canada, Sweden, and more. This rise in suicides is potentially linked to the economic wellbeing of South Koreans, as suicides have historically been higher during times of economic strife.

== Demographics ==
=== Elderly ===
Between 17.8 and 27.9 percent of those aged 65 or older in South Korea are likely to suffer from depression, significantly higher than the rate in other countries. Factors associated with late life depression in Korea include living alone, smoking, financial hardships and intellectual disability. The high rate of depression among Korean elders may be a result of the rapidly aging population and the dissolution of the tradition of children caring for their aging parents. Government social services for the elderly, such as the Law of Elderly Welfare, are inadequate to provide for the growing population's needs, contributing to mental illness within the demographic.

Among a sample of elderly Koreans living in the United States, 34% were found to have depression, less than a fifth of which had ever seen a mental health professional. The majority of older Koreans living in the United States exhibited a negative perception of mental health services.

=== Adolescents ===
A 2006 study suggested that there was a gender difference in predictors of suicide ideation among Korean youth, with the main predictors for females being bullying, sexual orientation, depression, low self-esteem, and hostility. For males, it was history of suicide attempts, parental alcohol abuse, smoking, hostility, and low self-esteem.

More than 10% of Seoul adolescents have been found at high risk for internet addiction disorder. Internet addiction is positively correlated with family factors including child abuse and a harsh parenting style. Depression and obsessive-compulsive disorder are both correlated with internet addiction among adolescents.

The 2009 study found that a reason why internet addiction disorder is so prominent in Seoul adolescents is due to a large number of students using the internet primarily for online gaming. In middle school males, 67.0% listed online gaming as their primary use of the internet. High school males listed online gaming as their primary use of the internet at 44.8%. When females of the same age are taken into account, 23% listed their primary use for blogging/ updating personal homepages. High school females listed searching information at 23.9% as their primary use of the internet. A reason why males are more exposed to internet addiction disorder is the idea of internet shops called PC bangs, where the common customers are male from mid teens to late twenties.

== Treatment and countermeasures ==
The South Korean government passed the Mental Health Act in 1995. The Mental Health Act expanded the number of national mental hospitals and community mental health centers with the goal of making mental healthcare more accessible to communities. However, the act also made involuntary hospitalizations significantly easier. The 1999 Medical Protection Act and Welfare Law for the Handicapped protects the rights of disabled persons, and the mentally ill have qualified for protection under these laws since 2000. In 2005, it was reported that the Korean government did not officially allot any funds towards mental healthcare in the national budget. In 2011, it was reported that public spending on mental healthcare was low, at 3%, most of which goes to inpatient mental hospitals despite the fact that most people receive treatment from outpatient facilities.

South Korean law prohibits workplace discrimination based on mental health conditions, but a 2011 report found that discrimination persists due to the lack of enforcement of such legislation.

In 2012, South Korean schools began administering annual mental health screening tests called the "Student Emotional and Behavioral Characteristics Test". Schools also began adolescent treatment and mental health awareness programs.

In 2017, the Mental Health Act was amended to protect the individual rights and liberties of those admitted to inpatient mental hospitals.

In 2019, the mental health budget in South Korea was US$253.4 million: $90.3 million came from the general fund, $63.8 million came from the National Health Promotion Fund, and $97.3 million came from the special account for national mental hospitals. In 2020, the national budget allocated for mental health was 301 billion South Korean won, a 49.5 increase from the budget for mental health treatment in 2017.

=== Effectiveness ===
Some have questioned the overall effectiveness of South Korean health infrastructure, as the average length of stay in other OECD countries was less than a quarter of that in South Korea in 2011. Some also question how well treatment methods in South Korean mental hospitals are working compared to that of other OECD countries.

In the 2010s, it was reported that the basis of mental healthcare in South Korea shifted from long-term hospital stays to community-based healthcare, but the length of admission of those staying in mental hospitals was still on an upward trend.

=== Low treatment rate ===
Access to treatment and medication is reportedly widely available, but is consistently reported as being underutilized. The universal health coverage as provided by the state means that the majority of South Koreans can afford medicine and treatment for mental illness.

In 2017, a report stated that 7% percent of those affected by mental illness sought psychiatric help. A number of subsequent surveys reported 12.1% of people with diagnosed illnesses seeking treatment, and 17% of students seeking treatment.

==== Causes ====
A number of explanations have been proposed for the low rate of treatment.

One proposed cause for this is the prevalence of Confucianist values, where seeking treatment could be seen as losing face for the individual and for their family. It is also said by Korean doctors that Confucian culture emphasizes individual will and self-discipline which creates a social prejudice against mental health. Traditional Confucian ideals state that mental illnesses/disorders are meant to be tolerated, not treated. Studies have shown that those above 70 were less likely to seek treatment than those within the 19-29 years old age group because of such Confucian ideals. Gender also seems to affect those seeking help for mental illnesses. Women are more likely to seek medical attention to attend to their mental health needs than men, most likely because men have higher perceived stigma of mental health. Those who turn to therapy often pay out-of-pocket and in cash to avoid the stigma associated with mental health services on one's insurance record. Stigma also hinders the ability of those recovering from mental illness to reintegrate into society.

Another proposal is that there is low awareness of mental health resources. A 2021 survey administered to South Korean youths found that only 17.4% knew what treatment services were available.

Another proposal is that parents often do not recognize symptoms of mental health issues. In one study, it was proposed that 67% of parents' and youths' refusal to seek treatment could be explained by lack of such awareness.

South Koreans are considered to have comparatively higher levels of internalized stigma, which relates to higher rates of mental illness and more severe symptoms.
