= Ministry of Food and Drug Safety =

Government ministry of South Korea

- 식품의약품안전처

Agency overview
- Formed: 12 March 2013; 13 years ago
- Preceding agency: Korea Food & Drug Administration
- Jurisdiction: Government of South Korea
- Headquarters: Cheongju, South Korea
- Minister responsible: Oh Yu-kyoung
- Deputy Minister responsible: Kwon Oh-sang
- Website: www.mfds.go.kr (in English)

Korean name
- Hangul: 식품의약품안전처
- Hanja: 食品醫藥品安全處
- RR: Sikpum uiyakpum anjeoncheo
- MR: Sikp'um ŭiyakp'um anjŏnch'ŏ

The Ministry of Food and Drug Safety (MFDS; Korean: 식품의약품안전처), formerly known as the Korea Food & Drug Administration (KFDA; 식품의약품안전청), is a government agency responsible for promoting public health by ensuring the safety and effectiveness of foods, pharmaceuticals, medical devices, and cosmetics as well as supporting the food and pharmaceutical industry in South Korea. The main goal is to offer people safe foods and drugs.

The headquarters are located in the Osong Health Technology Administration Complex in Cheongju, North Chungcheong Province.

MFDS is a regulatory member of the International Council for Harmonisation (ICH).

== History ==
In April 1996, Korea Food and Drug Safety and its six regional offices were established. In 1998, it was raised to the status of administration (Korea Food & Drug Administration). In 2004, the organization was restructured with the creation of the Medical Devices Management Division and Bioproduct Technical Support Division. In March 2013, the organization was again restructured and elevated to a ministry.

== List of ministers ==
- Park Jong-sei, 1998–1999
- Huh Kun, 1999-2000
- Yang Gyuhwan, 2000-2002
- Lee Youngsoon, 2002-2003
- Shim Changkoo, 2003-2004
- Kim Chungsook, 2004-2006
- Moon Changjin, 2006-2007
- Kim Myunghyun, 2007-2008
- Yun Yeopyo, 2008-2010
- Noh Yunhong, 2010-2011
- Lee Heesung, 2011-2013
- Chung Seung, 2013-2015
- Kim Seunghee, 2015-2016
- Sohn Mungi, 2016-2017
- Ryu Youngjin, 2017-2019
- Lee Eui-Kyung, 2019-2020
- Kim Ganglip, 2020-2022
- Oh Yu-kyoung, 2022-

== See also ==
- List of food safety organisations
- Pharmaceutical Affairs Law (South Korea)
