= Pharmaceutical Affairs Law (South Korea) =

- Hangul: 약사법
- Hanja: 藥事法
- RR: Yaksabeop
- MR: Yaksapŏp

The Pharmaceutical Affairs Law of South Korea is a law regulating the manufacturing, importation, and sale of drugs and medical devices.

== Effects ==
The law has brought many difficulties to diabetes patients, as the test strip papers required by glucose meters used for home blood glucose monitoring were considered pharmacologic supplies under the law, and thus legally could only be sold by pharmacies. Medical supply shops were permitted to sell the test strips as well, but a 2005 crackdown on 200 such shops in Suseo-dong, Gangnam-gu, Seoul brought the law into the spotlight. People with diabetes complained that different meters required different test strips, and pharmacies did not always carry the required brands. An official at the Korea Food & Drug Administration said the government might resolve the issue by reclassifying the test strips as non-pharmacological supplies, but the issue would take time due to conflicts of interest.
