= Suicidal ideation in South Korean LGBTQ youth =

Suicidal ideation and suicidal thoughts are often the precursors of suicide, which is the leading cause of death among youth. Ideation or suicidal thoughts are categorized as: considering, seriously considering, planning, or attempting suicide and youth is typically categorized as individuals below the age of 25. Various research studies show an increased likelihood of suicide ideation in youth in the LGBT community.

Factors involved in this propensity are peer victimization, parental disapproval, and bullying, as well as overall sentiments of undesirability due to LGBT identity. South Korea has the 10th highest rate of suicide in the world and the second in the OECD. Within these rates, suicide is the primary cause of death for South Korean youth, ages 10–19. While these rates are elevated, suicide ideation additionally increases with the introduction of LGBT identity.

== Stigmatization ==
Stigmatization of LGBT identities results in negative self-feelings for the individual and increases their risk for self-harm and substance abuse. Studies done to measure the tolerance of homosexuality among South Korean University students found that of approximately 800 students surveyed, "68% would not be comfortable with having LGBT family members", "26.5% disagreed homosexuals could be good people", and "17.3% agreed homosexuality was shameful". The indicators of a disapproving or even repulsive opinion of LGBT individuals was gender, with men being more prone to disapprove than women. A second indicator of negative feelings towards LGBT individuals is religion, primarily in the realms of recognizing or approving of LGBT marriages.

== Harassment ==
According to Rainbow Action, a South Korean Organization aimed at improving LGBT rights in South Korea, 80% of LGBT youth reported being the subjects of homophobic slurs from their peers and also approximate 80% reported hearing slurs from teachers. The harassment suffered by LGBT youth extends beyond merely verbal abuse. Studies show that there is a strong link between experience of violence for youth who have same-sex attraction, specifically in women who sleep with both men and women. Some studies suggest the main reason for suicidal ideation in youth is their exposure to violence in school.

== Effects of societal disapproval ==
According to Joiner's Interpersonal Theory, feelings of isolation and perceived burdensomeness contribute greatly to an individual's propensity toward suicide ideation. Studies have found that in gay and lesbian South Korean youth, these two main factors are present at higher rates than in their heterosexual counterparts. Isolation is in reference to the continuous exposure to anti-LGBT rhetoric which creates a hostile atmosphere to navigate.

Similarly, the hostility decreases the likelihood of other LGBT people being available for connection, which increases the feelings of alienation. Perceived burdensomeness is in reference to feeling like an individual is a burden to their friends and/or family. These factors combined create feelings of hopelessness which then lead to suicide ideation.

=== Statistics of suicidal ideation ===
According to one study, the analysis of cross-sectional data from 146,621 students aged 12–17 years for the years 2012 and 2013 showed that the prevalence of suicidal ideation was higher among youths with same-sex intercourse experience (45.9% for females, 33.7% for males) than among youths with opposite-sex intercourse experience (42.2% for females, 23.8% for males) and those with no experience in intercourse (21.0% for females, 12.7% for males). The study defined lesbian, gay, or bisexual youth as youths who engaged in a type of sexual intercourse, same-sex or both-sex intercourse.

Other study conducted with 105 adolescent LB youth found that:

- 70% experienced suicide ideation and
- 45.7% attempted suicide at least once

== Solutions ==
Most publications suggest an introduction of strict anti-discrimination policies would greatly alleviate the distress of the youth. These policies would be aimed at decreasing and eventually stopping school violence towards LGBT youth. Implementation of supportive policies and strategies enacted by schools and their personal and staff would create environments wherein the youth would feel more comfortable since "recent research has shown that higher levels of protectiveness and supportive school climates for LGB youths reduced suicidal thoughts".

== See also ==
- LGBT rights in South Korea
- Suicide in South Korea
- Solidarity for LGBT Human Rights of Korea

General:

- Healthcare and the LGBTQ community
- Human rights in South Korea
- LGBTQ bullying
- LGBTQ youth vulnerability
- Mental disorders and LGBTQ
- Suicide among LGBT youth
