= Suicide in South Korea =

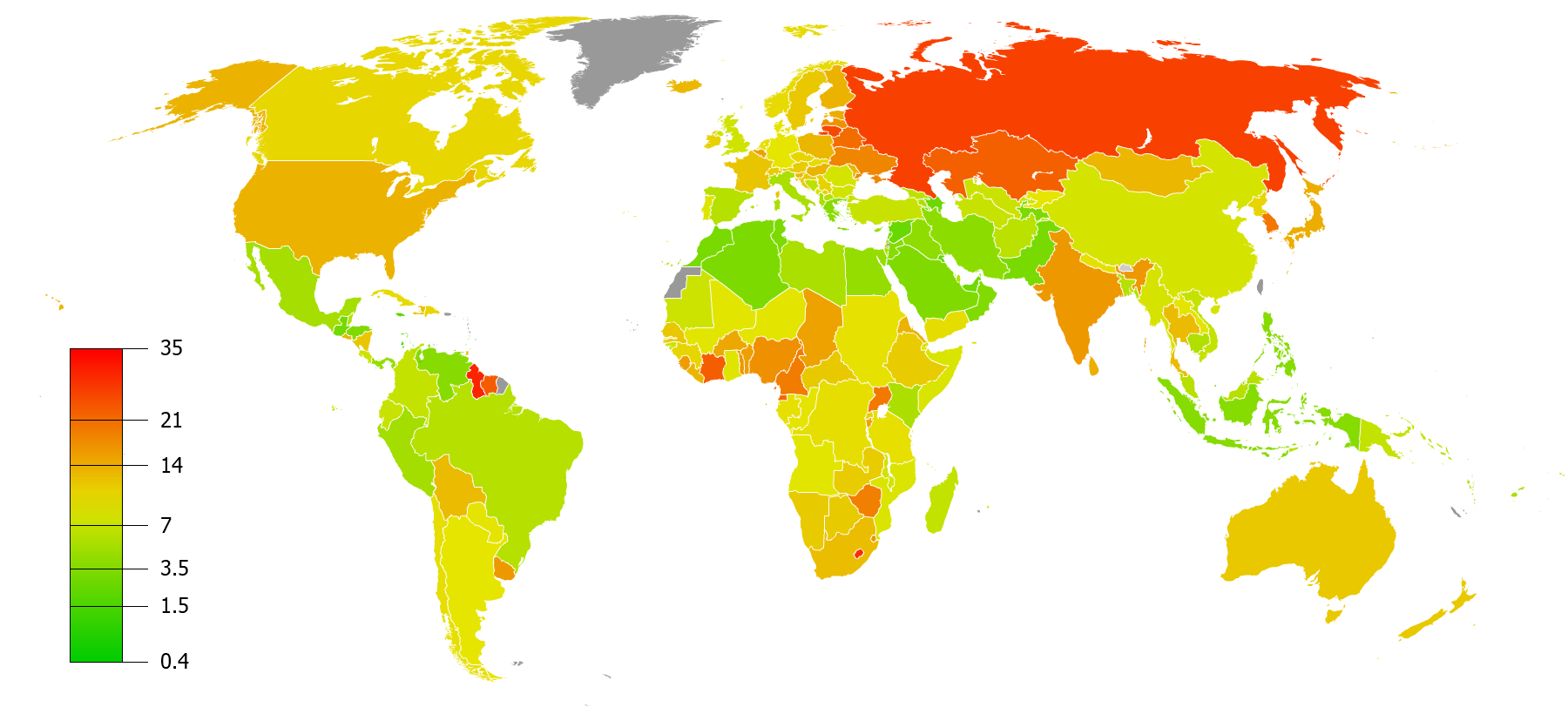
South Korea's suicide rate per 100,000 people compared to other countries, World Health Organization, 2016. According to researcher Peeter Värnik, a simple majority of total suicides occur in just six countries, South Korea is one of them.

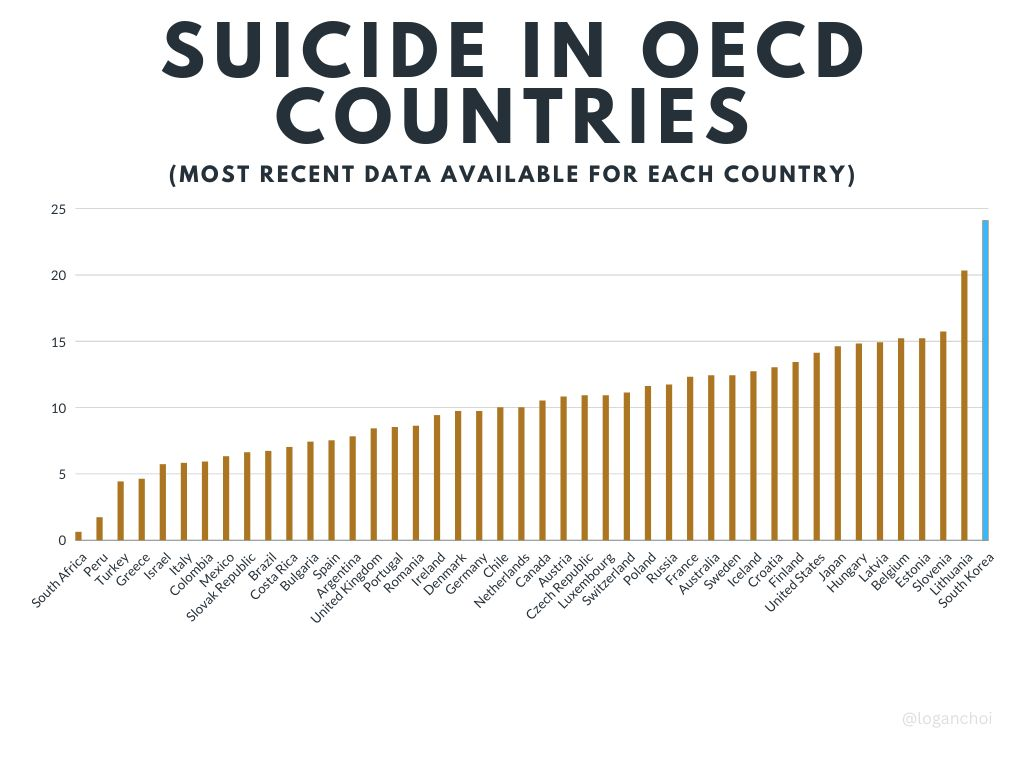
The most recent available data on OECD countries' suicide rates per 100 000 persons (November 2, 2022). South Korea has the highest rate in the OECD.

South Korea had the 8th highest suicide rate in the world in 2021, and the highest among OECD countries. The elderly in South Korea are at the highest risk of suicide, but deaths from teen suicide have been rising since 2010, and in 2025, suicide became the leading cause of death for South Koreans aged in their 40s, surpassing deaths from cancer. In 2022, suicide caused more than half of all deaths among South Koreans in their twenties. It is the leading cause of death for those between the age of 10 and 39.

Relative poverty among senior citizens in South Korea, although declining since 2011, has contributed to their high rate of suicide. Because of a poorly-funded social safety net for the elderly, many choose to take their own life so as not to be a financial burden to their families. The social tradition of children looking after their parents in old age has largely disappeared in 21st century South Korea. Rural residents tend to have higher suicide rates due to self-reported high rates of elderly discrimination. For example, 85.7% of people in their 50s reported experiencing ageism, especially when applying for jobs. Poverty, age discrimination, and suicide often occur together.

In 2011 the South Korean government enacted the suicide prevention act, which created a network of government funded suicide prevention and mental health welfare centers across the country. They had an effect of decreasing suicide rates when the number of suicides per 100,000 people declined by 4.1% from 28.5 in 2013 to 27.3 in 2014, the lowest in six years since 2008's 26.0 people.

A 2024 Time magazine investigation reported that South Korea's suicide prevention and mental health welfare centers receive insufficient government funding, data, and support. Senior officials from six local centers alleged that the central government withholds suicide-related data from them "to shield districts, cities, and provinces with high rates of suicide from reputational damage," obstructing their efforts "to enact policies that would meet the needs of their communities and, ultimately, save lives."

== Statistics ==
Suicide is the most common cause of death to those in their 10s, 20s and 30s.

Suicide rate by gender and age in South Korea 2012, per 100,000 people

The poverty rate of elderly people in South Korea is the highest among the OECD countries.

=== Age ===
An extremely high suicide rate among the elderly is a major contributing factor to South Korea's overall suicide rate. As people age, certain sociopsychological factors such as income decline due to retirement, increased medical costs, physical deterioration or disabilities, loss of spouse or friends and no sense of purpose increases the risk of suicide. Many impoverished elderly people choose to die by suicide as to not be a burden on their families, since the South Korean welfare system is poorly funded and the tradition of children caring for their parents in old age has largely disappeared in the 21st century. As a result, people living in rural areas have higher suicide rates.

Although lower than the rate for the elderly, grade school and college students in Korea have a higher than average suicide rate.

Over a 5 year period, the number of suicide or self-inflicted injuries has increased from 4,947 in 2015 to 9,828 in 2019, and most cases involved people aged between 9 and 24. Kang Byung-won, a Parliament member from the Democratic party announced that "26.9 young South Koreans either attempt suicide or suffer self-inflicted injuries per day."

=== Gender ===
On average, men have a suicide rate that is twice as high as women. However, the suicide attempt rate is higher for women than men. According to a study, because men use more severe and lethal suicide methods, men have higher suicidal completion rate than women. The Risk-Rescue Rating Scale (RRRS), which measures the lethality of the suicidal method by gauging the ratio between five risk and five rescue factors, averaged out to be 37.18 for men and 34.00 for women. One study has translated this to the fact that women attempt to die by suicide more as a demonstration, while men die by suicide with a determined purpose.

While male adolescents generally have higher suicide rates than females, South Korea is an outlier where the female adolescent suicide rate is relatively high compared to other developed countries.

=== Marital status ===
Studies suggest that suicide rates are different between marital statuses. Individuals who were never married or had a change in their marital status due to divorce, death or separation are at a higher risk of suicide than married individuals. Divorced individuals are the most at-risk group, followed by individuals who have never married and widowed individuals were the lowest at-risk group. Family relationships also contributed to the mental health of men and women. The study of divorce, separated or widowed statuses showed that individuals dissatisfied with family relationships were at a higher risk of depression, thoughts of suicide and low self-esteem.

Roy Baumeister's escape theory is used to further explain the differences in suicide rates between marital statuses. According to Baumeister, the escape theory has six steps, increasing the chance of dying by suicide if the criteria for all six steps are met. Baumeister states that depression alone does not lead to suicide because most depressed individuals do not attempt suicide and not all who have attempted suicide are clinically depressed. According to Baumeister, the model can be viewed as a decision tree: First, the individual has a severe failure or setback that falls below theirs or society's high expectations and standards. Second, the individual starts to make unfavorable self-attributions about themselves causing them to mentally spiral downwards.

Third, the individual will fuel their suicidal ideation by believing the failure or setback is because they are inadequate, unlikable, and guilty and a bad person. Fourth, the individual's negative emotions lead them to believe they fall short of perceived expectations. Fifth, the individual will start to experience cognitive deconstruction by shifting to low levels of thinking and becoming emotionless. Sixth, cognitive deconstruction remove inhibitions making it difficult to recognize the consequences of suicide. Losing a spouse to death, divorce or separation might increase an individual's attempt at suicide.

=== Socioeconomic status ===
Socioeconomic status is measured by a population's level of education, degree of urbanity and deprivation of the residence. Low socioeconomic status, high stress, inadequate sleep, alcohol use, and smoking are associated with suicidal tendencies among adolescents. The economic hardship factor is noted as the most frequently referred cause for elderly suicides. As 71.4% of the elderly population is uneducated and 37.1% of them live in rural areas, they are more likely to face economic hardship, which can lead to health problems and family conflicts. All these factors together lead to an increase in suicidal ideation and completion.

=== Regions ===
Gangwon has a 37.84% higher suicide rate than the rate for all of South Korea. Following Gangwon, Chungnam rates second and Jeonbuk rates third. Ulsan, Gangwon, and Incheon have the highest suicide rate for people above age 65. Daegu has the highest suicide rate for those ages 40 to 59. Gangwon, Jeonnam, and Chungnam have the highest suicide rates for those ages 20 to 39.

== Methods ==
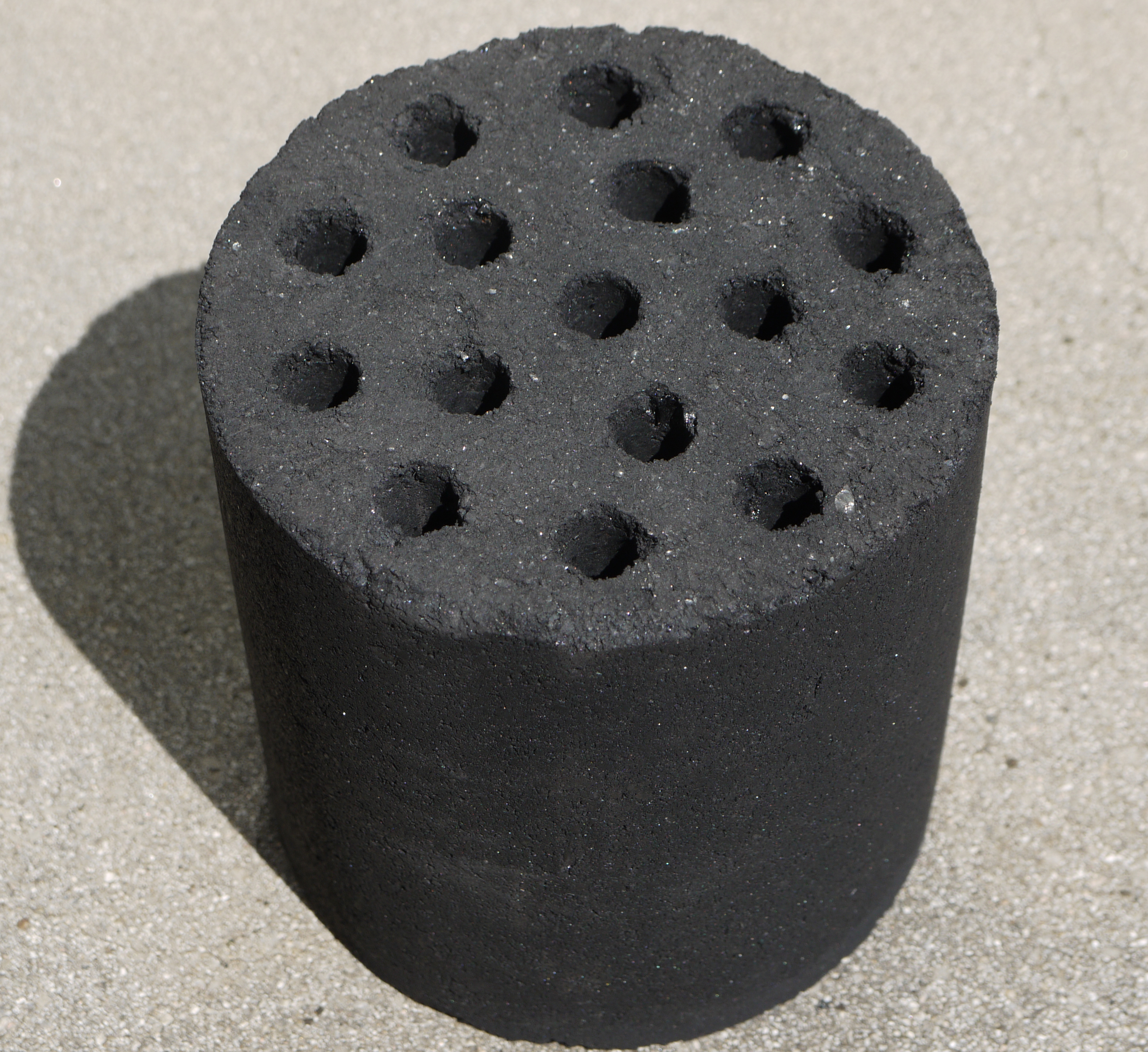
Yeontan burning has been used as a suicide method in South Korea.

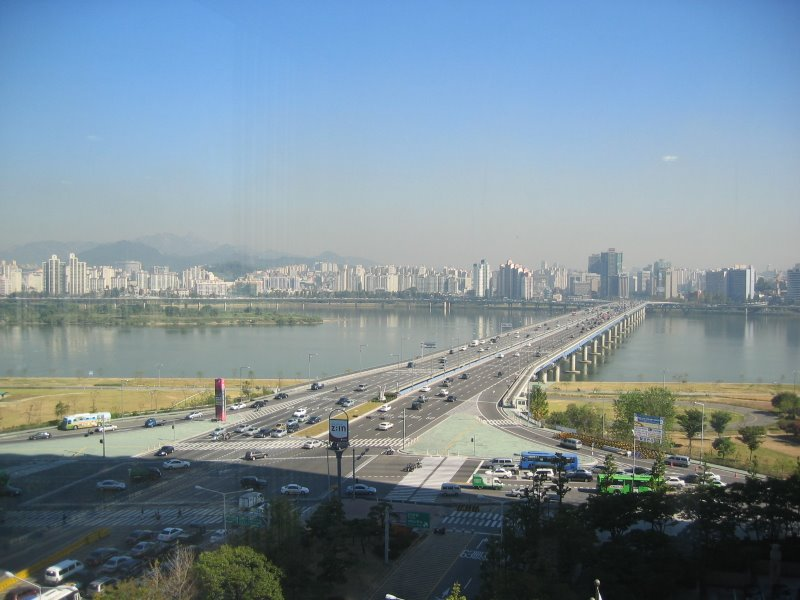
The Mapo Bridge in Seoul is locally known as "Suicide Bridge" and "The Bridge of Death" due to its frequent usage as a suicide site.

Because South Korean law heavily restricts firearms possession, only one-third of South Korean women use violent methods to die by suicide. Poisoning is the most commonly used method for South Korean women, with pesticides accounting for half of suicide deaths amongst women. 58.3% of suicides from 1996 to 2005 used pesticide poisoning. Another prevalent method by which South Koreans die by suicide is hanging. A study by Jeon et al. has shown a difference between the methods used by suicide attempters who did plan and did not plan their attempts. Unplanned suicide attempters tend to use chemical agents or falling three times as often as planned suicide attempters.

A study by Subin Park et al. states that a major reason for the general upward trend in the South Korean suicide rate from 2000 to 2011 was the increase in suicides by hanging. Throughout that time period, hanging grew to be perceived as more painless, socially acceptable, and accessible, and became a much more common method throughout the first decade of the 21st century.

=== Carbon monoxide poisoning ===
In recent years amid the rise of suicide rates, yeontan burning has been used as a method of suicide by carbon monoxide poisoning.

=== Bridge jumping ===
Bridge jumping has also been used as a method of suicide. The Mapo Bridge in Seoul, is considered a suicide bridge, locally known as "Suicide Bridge" and "The Bridge of Death". South Korean authorities have tried to counter this by calling the bridge "The Bridge of Life" and posting reassuring messages on the ledges.

== Notable cases ==
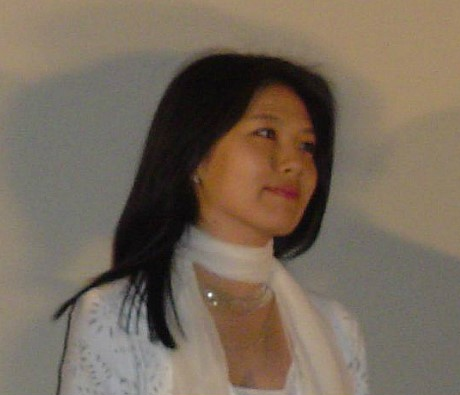
Actress Lee Eun-ju died by suicide at age 24 in 2005.

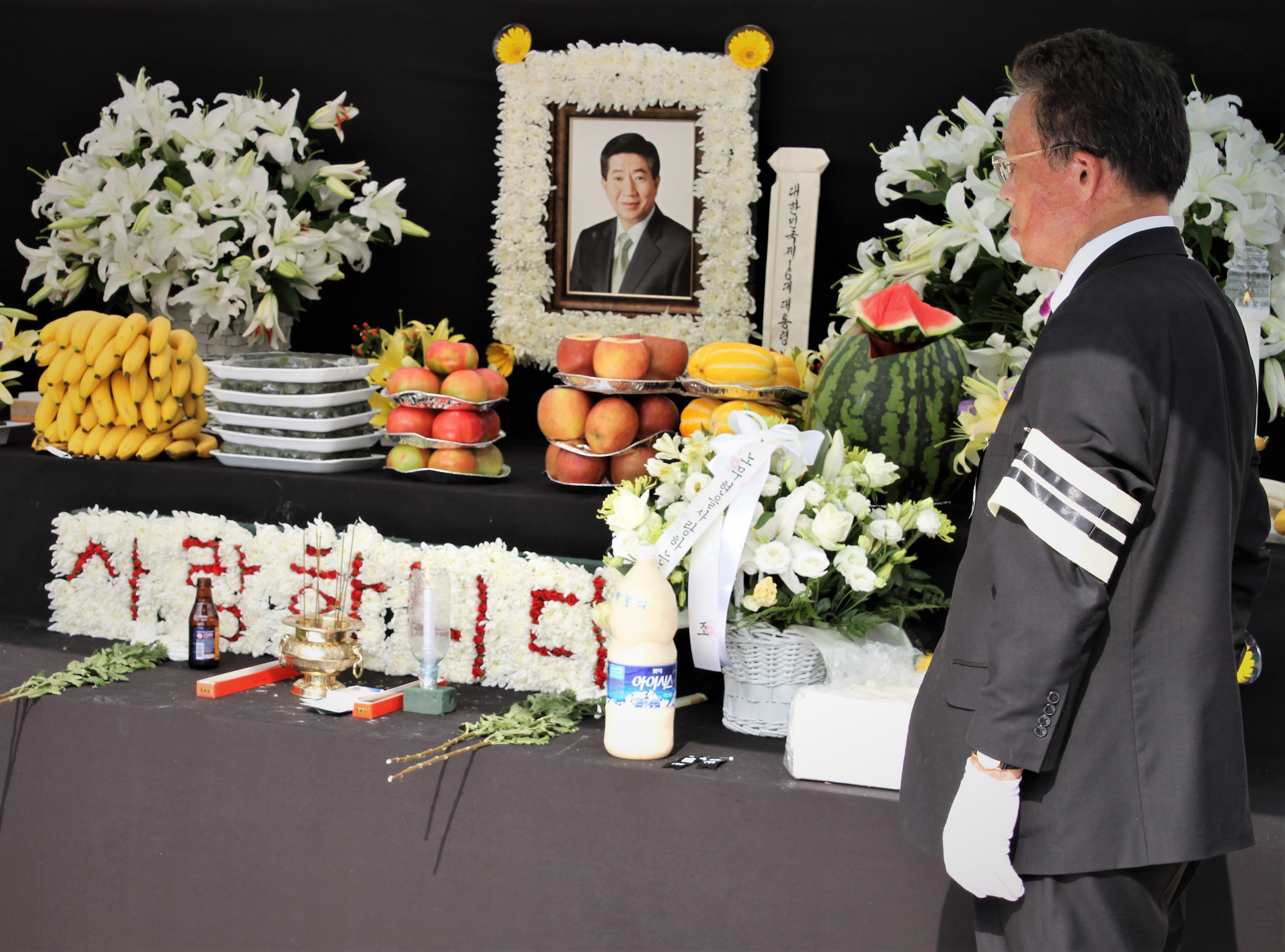
President Roh Moo-hyun died by suicide on 23 May 2009 in his home village of Bongha Maeul.

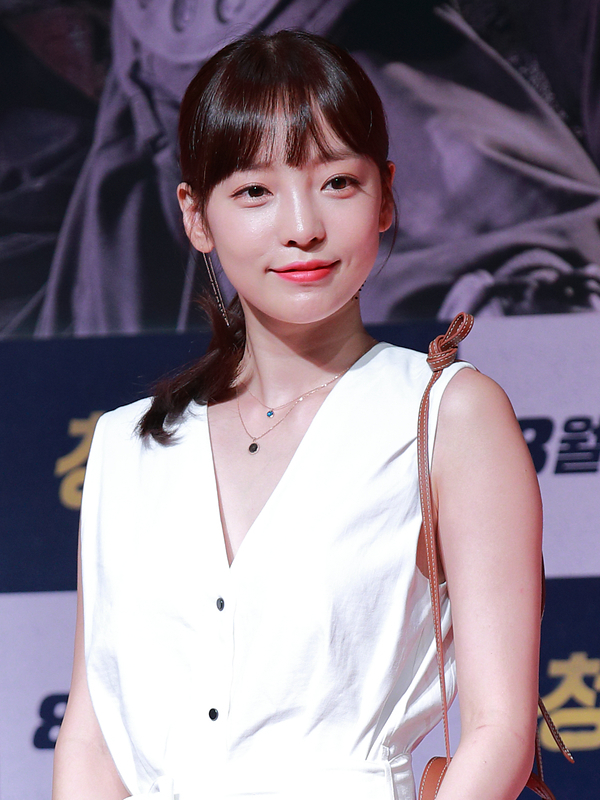
Goo Hara, a former member of the group KARA, died from an apparent suicide in November 2019, after being cyberbullied by malicious commenters online.

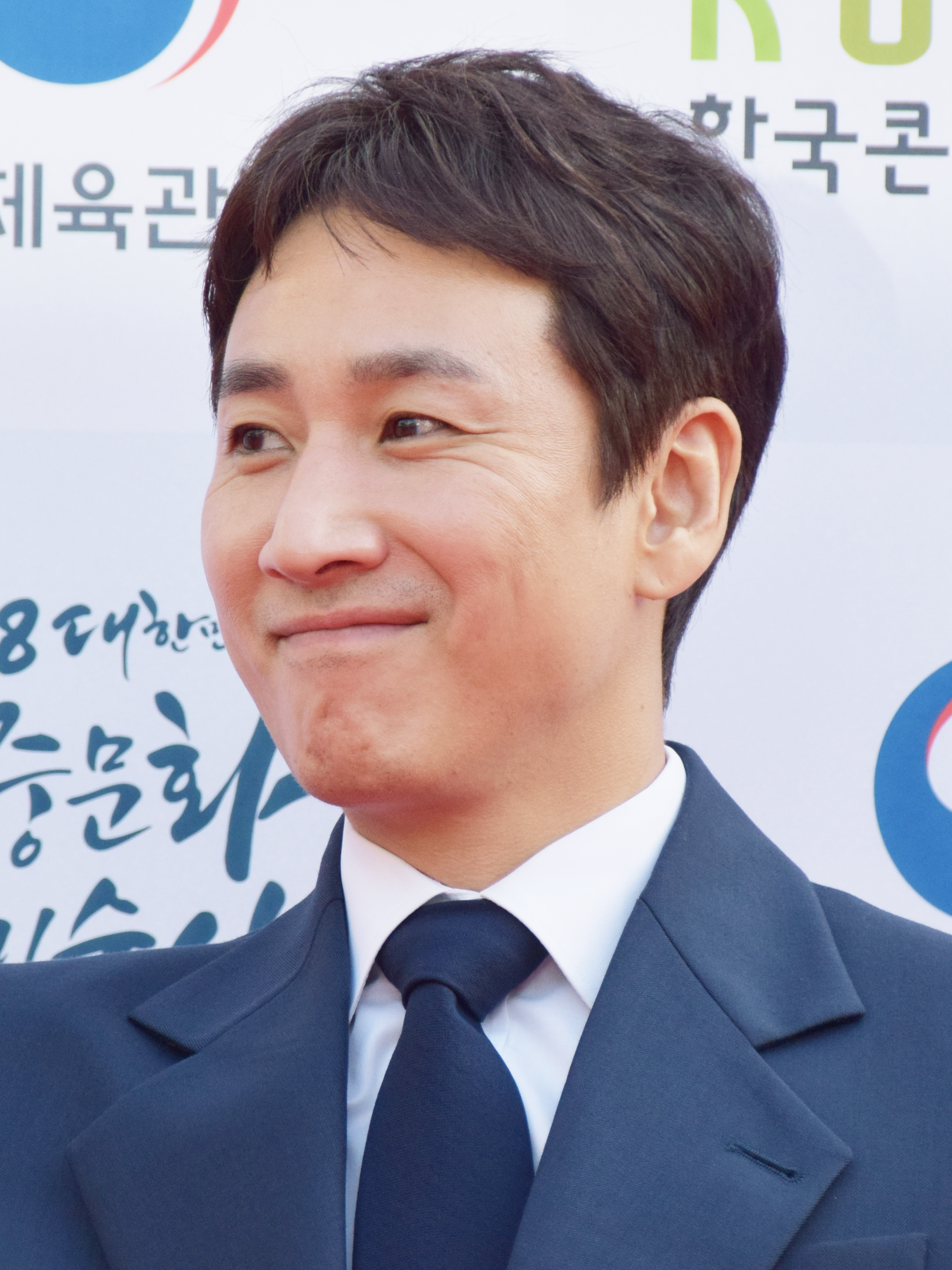
Actor Lee Sun-kyun died by suicide in December 2023

- On 22 February 2005, actress Lee Eun-ju, the star of hit films including Taegukgi and The Scarlet Letter, died by suicide at the age of 24.
- On 21 January 2007, performance artist U;Nee died by hanging at the age of 25.
- Circa 22 August 2008, actor Ahn Jae-hwan died by carbon monoxide poisoning.
- On 2 October 2008, "The Nation's Actress" Choi Jin-sil died by suicide at the age of 39.
- On 6 October 2008, actor and model Kim Ji-hoo died by suicide by hanging following harassment due to being gay.
- On 7 March 2009, actress Jang Ja-yeon died by suicide at the age of 29. She left a letter alleging violence, abuse, and sexual exploitation by several people in the entertainment industry.
- On 23 May 2009, former president Roh Moo-hyun leapt to death from a ravine.
- On 19 November 2009, supermodel Daul Kim died by suicide in Paris at the age of 20.
- On 18 October 2014, a 37-year-old government safety official who oversaw organization of the 17 October concert of the K-pop group 4Minute died by suicide, after 16 people had been killed and 11 others were injured by the collapse of a faulty ventilation grate at that concert.
- On 9 April 2015, construction tycoon Sung Wan-jong died by suicide amid allegations of corruption and left a suicide note in which he named persons he claimed had been involved in corruption.
- On 18 December 2017, Kim Jonghyun, a main vocalist of South Korean group Shinee, died by suicide at the age of 27. He was found unconscious in a hotel room by paramedics after sending a suicide note to his sister and was later pronounced dead on arrival at the hospital. A suicide note was found highlighting his struggle with depression that he had spoken about over many years. In it were words such as "I am broken inside", "I hate myself", and references to a doctor who blamed his depression on his personality.
- On 14 October 2019, Sulli, an actress and former member of f(x), died by suicide at the age of 25. She was found dead in her home by her manager.
- On 24 November 2019, Goo Hara, an actress and former member of Kara, died by suicide at the age of 28. She had attempted to end her own life once before, on 26 May 2019, but was found in time and taken to hospital.
- On 27 December 2023, Lee Sun-kyun, an actor who was best known for his international role in Parasite, died by suicide at the age of 48.
- On 12 November 2024, Song Jae-rim, an actor died by suicide at the age of 39.
- On 16 February 2025, Kim Sae-ron, an actress died by suicide at the age of 24.

== Causes ==
The topic of suicide remains taboo in South Korea because it is often viewed as a personal weakness or failure. Those who struggle with suicidal thoughts have cited societal pressure to succeed, isolation, worthlessness and discrimination as contributing factors.

=== Media ===
According to the Werther effect, some people attempt suicide as a reaction to another suicide. This applies also for South Korea. According to a study, South Korea experiences a surge in suicides after the deaths of celebrities. The study has found three out of eleven cases of celebrity suicide resulted in a higher suicide rate of the population. The study controlled for the potential effects of confounding factors, such as seasonality and unemployment rates, and yet celebrity suicides still had a strong correlation to increased rate of suicide rates for nine weeks.

The degree of media coverage of celebrity suicides impacts the degree of increase of suicide rates. In the study, the three celebrity suicides that received wide media coverage led to a surge in suicide rates, and the other celebrity suicides with low media coverage did not lead to an increase in the suicide rate. In addition to the increased suicidal ideation, celebrity suicides lead people to use the same methods to attempt suicide. Following actress Lee Eun-ju's death in 2005, more people used the same method of hanging.

An ongoing study has suggested that high use of the internet in South Korea is associated with suicides. Among 1,573 high school students, 1.6% of the population suffered from Internet addiction and 38.0% had a risk of Internet addiction. The students with, or at risk of, Internet addiction had a higher rate of suicidal ideation compared to those without Internet addiction. However, the correlational nature of the study makes it difficult to determine the causal direction of this relationship.

=== Education ===
In South Korea, every student is obligated to take the College Scholastic Ability Test (CSAT). On this day, underclassmen gather and cheer on their seniors as they enter the school to take their exams. The government has mandated forbidding planes from flying during this time to make sure there are no distractions to these students.

Education in South Korea is extremely competitive, making it difficult to get into an esteemed university. A South Korean student's school year lasts from March to February. The year divides into two semesters: one from March until July, and another from August to February. The average South Korean high school student also spends roughly 16 hours a day on school and school-related activities. They attend after school programs called hagwons and there are over 100,000 of them throughout South Korea, making them a 20 billion dollar industry.

Again, this is because of the competitiveness of acceptance into a good university. Most South Korean test scores are graded on a curve, leading to more competition. Since 2012, students in South Korea go to school from Monday to Friday. Before 2005, South Korean students went to school every day from Monday to Saturday.

Although South Korean education consistently ranks near the top in international academic assessments such as PISA, the enormous stress and pressure on its students is considered by many to constitute child abuse. It has been blamed for high suicide rates in South Korea among those aged 10–19. Studies have shown that 46% of high school students in Seoul, South Korea are depressed due to academic stress, which leads to suicidal ideation and suicide attempts. South Korea's competitive educational system and the stressful academic environment, plus the social expectations requiring students to excel in academics have negatively affected the physical, mental and emotional wellbeing of the students.

In April 2023, three teenagers died after jumping from high-rise buildings within five days of each other in a district known for its elite schools and expensive tutoring centers.

=== Family ===
Many people have been left orphaned or have lost a parent due to the Korean War. Within a random group of 12,532 adults, 18.6% of the respondents have lost their biological parent(s), with maternal death having a bigger impact on the rate of suicide attempts than paternal death. A study has shown that men have the highest rate of suicide attempts when they experience maternal death from the ages of 0–4 and 5–9. Women have the highest suicide attempt rate when they experience maternal death from the ages of 5–9.

=== Economy ===
In 1997 and 1998, the 1997 Asian financial crisis hit South Korea. During and after the economic recession of 1998, South Korea experienced a sharp economic recession of −6.9% and a surge of unemployment rate of 7.0%. A study has shown that this economic downfall had a strong correlation with an increase in suicide rates. Increase in unemployment and higher divorce rate during the economic downturn lead to clinical depression, which is a common factor that leads to suicide. Moreover, according to the sociologist Durkheim, economic downfall disturbs the social standing of an individual, meaning that the individual's demands and expectations can no longer be met. A person who cannot readjust to the deprived social order caused by economic downfall is more likely to die by suicide.

Analyzing the suicides up to 2003, Park and Lester note that unemployment is a major factor of high suicide rate. In South Korea, it has been the traditional duty of children to take care of their parents. However, as "cultural tradition of filial obligation is not congruent with the increasingly competitive, specialized labor market of the modern era", the elderly may seek to die by suicide so as to lessen the burden on their children.

=== Mental illness ===
In South Korea, mental illness is taboo, even within a family. Over 90% of suicide victims could be diagnosed with a mental disorder, but only 15% of them received proper treatment. Over two million people have depression annually in South Korea, but only 15,000 choose to receive regular treatment. Because mental illnesses are looked down upon in Korean society, families often discourage those with mental illnesses from seeking treatment. Since there is such a strong negative stigma on the treatment of mental illnesses, many symptoms go unnoticed and can lead to many irrational decisions including suicide. Alcohol is often used to self-medicate, and a significant percentage of attempted suicides occur while drunk.

=== COVID-19 ===
As the COVID-19 pandemic in South Korea continued, many men in their 50s and women in their 20s struggled, which led some to die by suicide.

== Responses ==
109 Suicide Prevention Hotline in South Korea

South Korea's reported suicide rate has consistently been declining since 2012. South Korea has implemented the Strategies to Prevent Suicide (STOPS), a project whose "initiatives aimed at increasing public awareness, improving media reporting of suicide, screening for persons at high risk of suicide, restricting access to means, and improving treatment of suicidally depressed patients". All of these methods strive to increase public awareness and governmental support for suicide prevention. Currently, South Korea and other countries that have implemented this initiative are in the process of evaluating how much influence this initiative has on the suicide rate. The education ministry created a smartphone app to check students' social media posts, messages and web searches for words related to suicide.

Because the media coverage and portrayal of suicide influence the suicide rate, the government has "promulgated national guidelines for reporting on suicide in print media". The national guideline helps the media coverage to focus more on warning signs and possibilities of treatment, rather than factors that lead to suicide.

Another method that South Korea has implemented is educating gatekeepers. The gatekeeper education primarily consists of knowledge of suicide and dealing with suicidal individuals, and this education is provided to teachers, social workers, volunteers and youth leaders. The South Korean government educates gatekeepers within at-risk communities, such as female elders or low-income families. To maximize the effect of gatekeepers, the government has also implemented evaluation programs to report the results.

Physical measures are also taken to prevent suicide. The government has reduced "access to lethal means of self-harm". As mentioned above in the methods, the government has restricted access to poisoning agents, monoxide from charcoal, and finally train platforms. This is to help decrease impulsive suicidal behavior.

== See also ==
- Mental health in South Korea
- Salaryman, Korea and Japan
- Shame society
- Education in South Korea
- Suicide ideation in South Korean LGBT youth
- Molka, hidden cameras in South Korea
- Working hours in South Korea

General:

- Suicide prevention
- Suicide intervention
- List of countries by suicide rate
