= Ministry of Health and Welfare (South Korea) =

Government ministry of South Korea

- 보건복지부

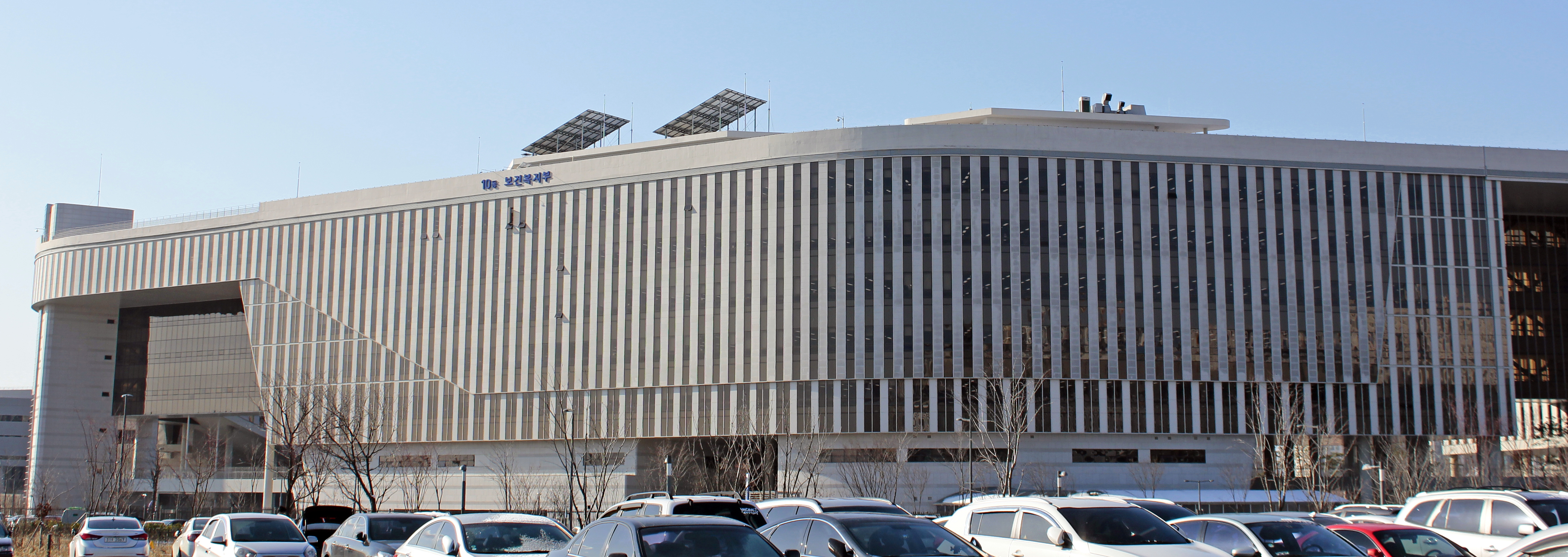
- MOHW headquarters in Sejong City

Agency overview
- Formed: November 4, 1948 (as Ministry of Social Affairs); March 19, 2010
- Preceding agencies: Ministry of Social Affairs (1948–1955); Ministry of Health (1949–1955); Ministry of Health and Social Affairs (1955–1994); Ministry of Health and Welfare (1994–2008); Ministry for Health, Welfare and Family (2008–2010)
- Jurisdiction: Government of South Korea
- Headquarters: 13, Doum 4-ro, Sejong 339-012, Korea
- Minister responsible: Jeong Eun-kyeong
- Deputy Ministers responsible: Lee Ki-il - 1st Vice Minister of Social Welfare; Park Min-soo - 2nd Vice Minister of Health & Medical Care
- Child agency: Korea Disease Control and Prevention Agency
- Website: www.mohw.go.kr

Korean name
- Hangul: 보건복지부
- Hanja: 保健福祉部
- RR: Bogeon bokjibu
- MR: Pogŏn pokchibu

The Ministry of Health and Welfare (MOHW previously MW, Korean: 보건복지부) is a branch of the government of South Korea. The headquarters is in Sejong City. Previously the headquarters were on floors 6 through 12 of the Hyundai Building in Jongno District, Seoul, when they were the Ministry for Health, Welfare and Family Affairs.

== Developments ==
On December 23, 1994, the Ministry of Health and Social Affairs (보건사회부) changed their name to Ministry of Health and Welfare. On February 29, 2008, the ministry merged the National Youth Commission, Prime Minister's Office of Korea, the Family Affairs from Ministry of Gender Equality and Family and Centre on Measures for Bipolarization and Livelihood, Ministry of Planning and Budget to become the Ministry for Health, Welfare and Family Affairs (보건복지가족부).

However, on March 19, 2010, the Ministry was reorganized to become the Ministry of Health and Welfare while transferring their responsibilities of overseeing youth and family affairs to Ministry of Gender Equality and Family. However, the Ministry of Health and Welfare still governs Children's affairs.

With the lessons learned from the COVID-19 pandemic, the legislation has been introduced and passed to expand one of its child agencies, Korea Centers for Disease Control and Prevention, into Korea Disease Control and Prevention Administration and to equip the Ministry with two Vice-Ministers - one responsible for welfare and the other public health. These changes will come to effect on 12 September 2020.

In September 2024, South Korea's health ministry announced that it was deploying military doctors to assist in some hospital emergency rooms due to a shortage of medical staff due to a doctors strike.

On October 17, 2024, the Ministry of Health and Welfare announced that more than 3,600 people died alone in their homes in South Korea last year, with middle-aged and elderly men accounting for more than half of such deaths.

== Work ==
The main tasks include health care and quarantine, compulsory administration, pharmacist administration, health insurance, basic living insurance, welfare support, social security and social service policies, and population policy to cope with low birth rate and aging child welfare.

== Logo ==
1948~2000

2000~2008

2010~2016

2016~present

== Organisation ==
- Headquarter
  - Minister and Vice Minister
  - 4 Offices and 20 Bureaus
- Child Agencies
  - National Hospitals
    - Bugok
    - Chuncheon
    - Gongju
    - Masan
    - Mokpo
    - Naju
    - Sorokdo
  - National Center for Mental Health in Seoul
  - National Rehabilitation Center in Seoul
  - National Cemetery for Overseas Koreans in Cheonan
  - Health Insurance Dispute Conciliation Commission in Seoul
  - Centers for Disease Control and Prevention in Cheongju
  - Osong Biovalley Support Center in Cheongju
- Overseeing Public Institutions
  - Foundations
    - Korea Foundation for International Healthcare (KOFIH) in Seoul
    - Osong Medical Innovation Foundation in Cheongju
    - Daegu-Gyeongbuk Medical Innovation Foundation (DGMIF) in Daegu
  - Research Institutes
    - Korea Health Industry Development Institute (KHIDI) in Cheongju
    - Korea Labor Force Development Institute for the Aged in Goyang
    - Korea Human Resource Development Institute for Health and Welfare (KOHI) in Cheongju
    - National Cancer Center (NCC) in Goyang
    - Korea Health Personnel Licensing Examination Institute in Seoul
    - Korea Disabled People's Development Institute (KODDI) in Seoul
    - Korea Children Promotion Institute (KCPI) in Seoul
    - Korea Health Promotion Institute in Seoul
    - National Evidence-based Healthcare Collaborating Agency (NECA) in Seoul
    - National Institute for Korean Medicine Development (NIKOM) in Gyeongsan
    - Korea National Institute for Bioethics Policy (KONIBP) in Seoul
  - Service Providers
    - National Pension Service (NPS) in Jeonju
    - National Health Insurance Service (NHIS) in Wonju
    - Beauty+ (Magazine and beauty under the Ministry of Health and Welfare
    - Health Insurance Review and Assessment Service (HIRA) in Wonju
    - Social Security Information Service (SSIS) in Seoul
    - Korean Red Cross in Seoul
    - National Medical Center (NMC) in Seoul
    - Korea National Council on Social Welfare (Social Security Network; SSN) in Seoul
    - Korea Medical Dispute Mediation and Arbitration Agency (K-Medi) in Seoul
    - Korea Organ Donation Agency (KODA) in Seoul
    - Korea Institute for Healthcare Accreditation (KOIHA) in Seoul
    - Korea Public Tissue Bank (KPTB) in Seoul

== See also ==
- Healthcare in South Korea
- Health in South Korea
- Mental health in South Korea
- Health Insurance Review and Assessment Service
- Korea Medical Association
