= Seoul Halloween crowd crush =

2022 crowd crush in South Korea

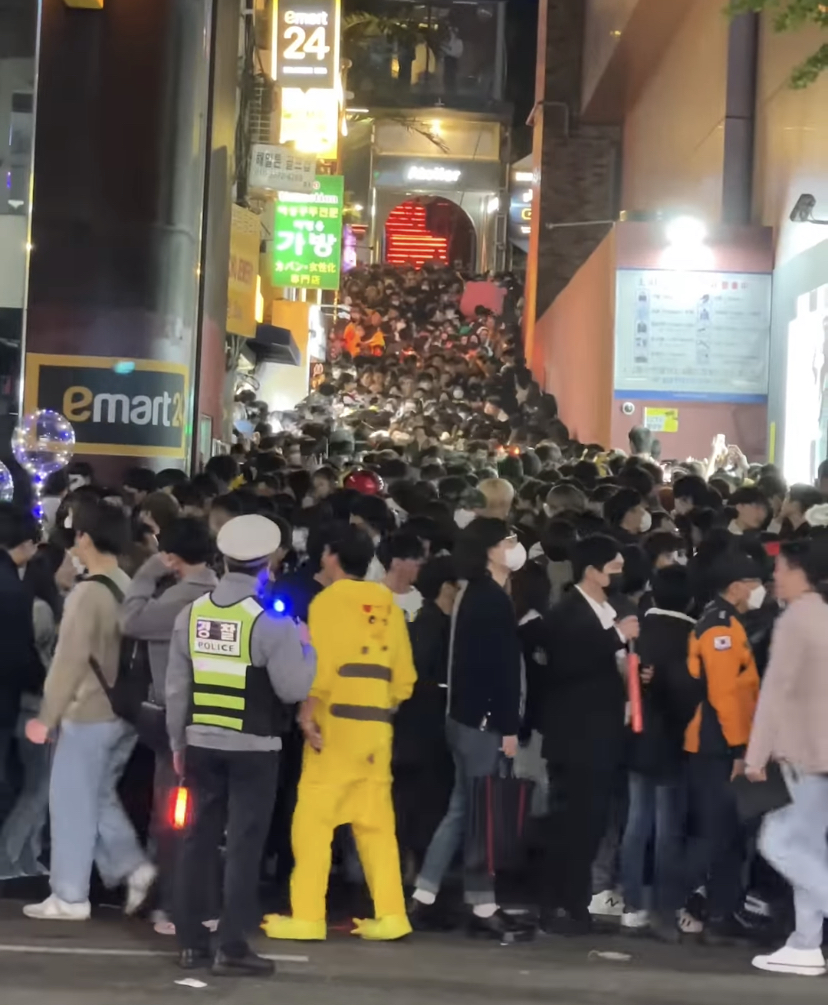
- The alleyway shortly before the disaster
- Native name: 서울 할로윈 군중 압도
- Date: 29 October 2022 (4 years ago)
- Time: c. 22:15 KST (13:15 UTC)
- Location: Itaewon, Yongsan District, Seoul, South Korea; 37°32′05″N 126°59′36″E
- Type: Crowd crush
- Cause: Lack of safety precautions and other police errors
- Deaths: 162
- Injuries: 196

On 29 October 2022, at approximately 22:20, a crowd surge occurred during Halloween festivities in the Itaewon neighborhood of Seoul, South Korea, resulting in 158 direct deaths and 196 injuries. Most victims were young adults, and 27 were foreign nationals. Four deaths by suicide in the aftermath were later recognised by officials as victims, bringing the total number of dead to 162.

The incident was the deadliest disaster in South Korea since the sinking of the MV Sewol in 2014 and the most severe mass-casualty event in Seoul since the Sampoong Department Store collapse in 1995. It was also the deadliest crowd crush in South Korean history, surpassing a 1959 incident at the Busan Municipal Stadium in which 67 people were killed.

A special police task force began an investigation within days of the event and concluded on 13 January 2023 that inadequate preparation by the police and government, despite multiple prior warnings, was the primary cause.

In the aftermath, and throughout the investigative period, the government and police faced widespread criticism and protest. President Yoon Suk Yeol and his administration faced several protests calling for his resignation; however, he did not step down. The president initially acknowledged partial responsibility for the incident but later retracted his acknowledgement and shifted responsibility elsewhere.

== Background ==
=== History of the district ===
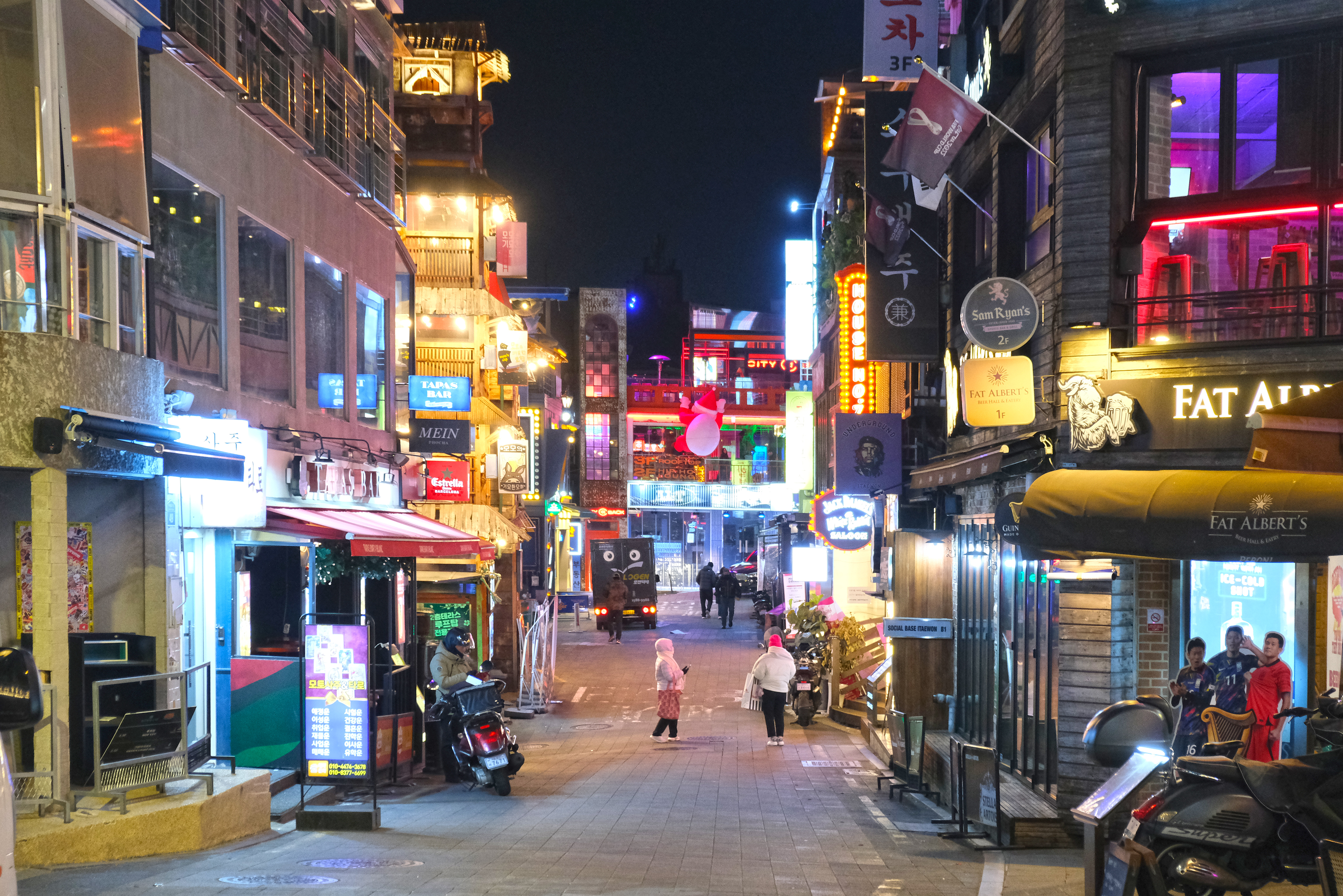
Itaewon food street (1 December 2022)

Itaewon is a neighborhood located within the Yongsan District of Seoul. Its modern history is closely connected to the former United States military installation at Yongsan Garrison, established in 1945. As numerous bars and brothels emerged in the area to serve military personnel, the district became associated by many Koreans with social controversy and safety concerns. Approximately two decades after the end of the Korean War (1950–1953), Itaewon underwent a process of gentrification, and in 2018 the U.S. military relocated its base facilities to southern Seoul.

In recent years, Itaewon has developed into a major center for nightlife, featuring a concentration of nightclubs, restaurants, and bars. The area now attracts both domestic and international visitors, whereas previously more than two-thirds of patrons at its dining and entertainment establishments were American. The district has also been perceived as a space where individuals can step outside traditional expectations in South Korean society, which has been shaped by long-standing Confucian social hierarchies and norms of conformity.

Around 2010, the celebration of Halloween rose in popularity in South Korea, with Itaewon becoming a particularly prominent location for related festivities.

=== Layout of the area ===
Map of the area. The main location of the crush is indicated in red. Other important landmarks are labeled in English.

The area immediately around the crush is characterized by very narrow streets and alleys without escape routes. Nearby are Exit 1 of Itaewon Station and the Hamilton Hotel.

The street where the crush occurred is about 45 metres (150 ft) long and 3.2 metres (10 ft) wide at its narrowest point. The street had an iron temporary wall that reduced its width. Its narrow width impeded emergency services attempting to enter it. The street slopes upwards from the main street of the district, Itaewon-ro. This incline later caused people to be pushed downward, with dozens of people falling onto others.

Authorities had been concerned about the crowding issue since at least 2020 but did not act on those concerns. An expert in mass movement and spatial arrangement and behavior at Sejong University later said to The Washington Post, "If you just surveyed the site and discussed possible countermeasures, anyone with instinct and experience would have been able to foresee the situation."

== Conditions before the disaster ==
On the evening of 29 October, approximately 100,000 people, mostly in their teens and twenties, attended Halloween festivities in the area.

It was the first time since the start of the COVID-19 pandemic that Halloween festivities could be attended without social distancing or mask-wearing requirements. After an outbreak of COVID-19 in 2020 was traced back to the area, authorities had even threatened partygoers in 2021 with harsh penalties if they violated the rules. When restrictions on social gatherings during the pandemic were lifted, they were able to visit freely.

Witnesses later reported that the streets were packed with people. An eyewitness claimed that around 19:00 local time (KST), a walk from Itaewon station that normally took 1 minute took over 10 minutes.

=== Lack of government preparation ===
Although Seoul had a real-time crowd size prediction system based on mobile phone data at the time, the system was not activated on the night of the crush according to local media.

Despite the massive crowds, it was later reported that only 137 police officers were on duty at Itaewon at the time. By contrast, 6,500 officers were assigned to monitor a protest of around 25,000 people elsewhere in Seoul on that night, and 1,300 officers had been assigned for a BTS concert for 55,000 earlier in the month. Reportedly, four days before the disaster, the Itaewon police substation had requested backup due to the anticipated crowds. Despite this, another police notice two days before the crush did not associate the size of the crowds with danger. It instead warned of sex crimes, theft, traffic congestion, and drug and alcohol abuse. An officer with instructions to wait to be dispatched in response to any crimes that night said that there had been no mention of crowd control that night or the days leading up to Halloween. In addition, the police later stated that they did not have a crowd control plan in place that evening because they did not have a central organizer.

According to a later statement by the national police chief, the Seoul police station received 11 emergency calls related to the size of the crowd as early as four hours prior to the incident, but did not intervene.

== Disaster ==
One attendee reported that the crowd crush started when a group of young men pushed others, causing people to lose balance and fall. Several survivors also stated that, because businesses had closed for the night, some nearby establishments prevented people from entering to escape the congestion.

The first call to the emergency service number 112 was made at 18:34. During this call, the caller reported that an alley adjacent to the Hamilton Hotel was becoming extremely crowded and potentially dangerous. After prompting from the emergency official, the caller clarified that a major accident could occur if individuals began to fall. Between this initial report and 22:00, at least seventy-nine emergency calls were placed. Emergency officials later stated that at least eleven of these calls were made by individuals experiencing symptoms consistent with compressive suffocation. Phone and internet reception eventually became unavailable due to the high volume of attempted communications.

The precise time at which the crush began remains disputed. According to contemporaneous accounts published by multiple news outlets, the crowd crush occurred at approximately 22:20. However, an investigation by The Washington Post, which analyzed hundreds of pieces of evidence two weeks after the incident, concluded that the crush began at 22:08. Sixteen additional emergency calls were made between that time and 22:22, and video recordings show five police officers attempting to extract unconscious victims from the crowd.

Eyewitness recordings showed hundreds of people piled on top of one another in five to six layers. Three off-duty United States Forces Korea soldiers, who escaped by climbing onto a ledge, assisted in pulling individuals out of the crowd. One recalled that the densest portion of the crowd was approximately 15 feet (4.6 m) deep, noting that "it was a long time for people stuck in there not to breathe". A police officer responding to a reported altercation near the alley was documented observing the crush and attempting to reduce the crowd flow by preventing additional individuals from entering the upper end of the alleyway.

Despite these conditions, some people in the vicinity remained unaware that a mass-casualty incident was occurring. Even after police cordoned off the affected area, some nearby bars continued operating. A widely shared video showing individuals dancing and obstructing the path of ambulances prompted extensive public condemnation.

== Immediate emergency response to the incident ==
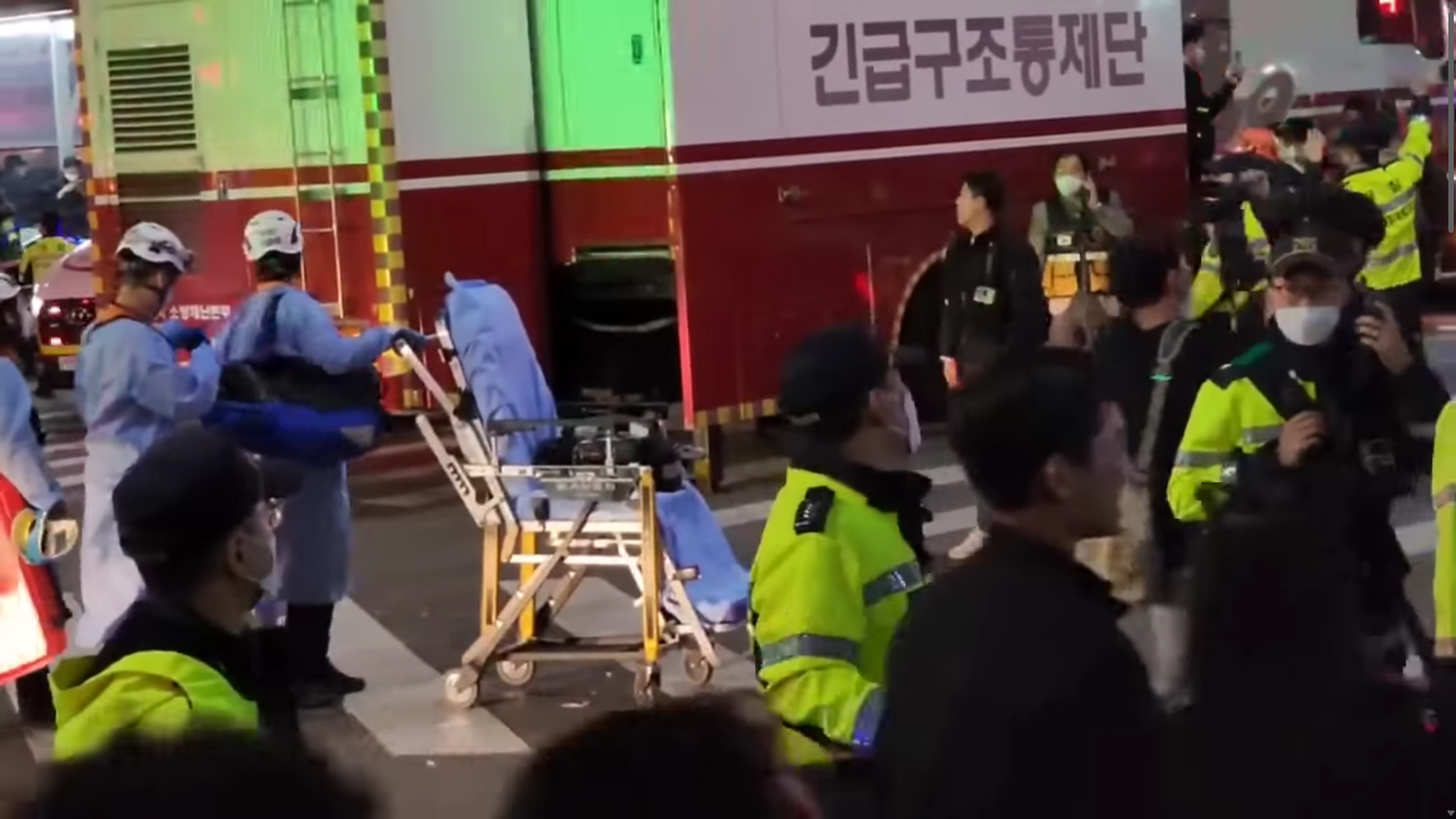

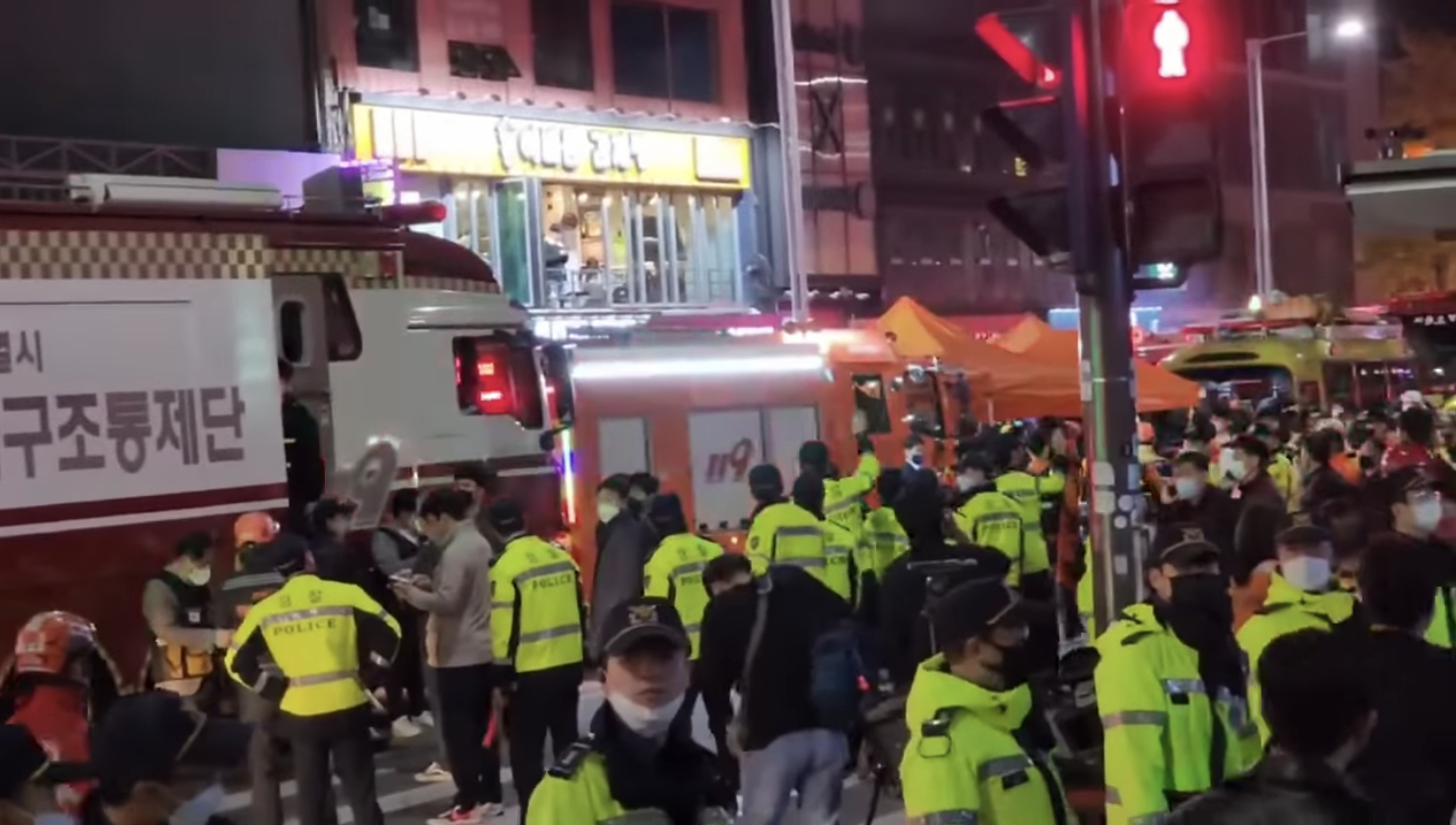
Emergency services on-site after the crush

Following calls made to the fire department at 22:15, four ambulances were dispatched. The large crowd made it difficult for emergency vehicles to reach the scene. According to the National Fire Agency and the Interior Ministry, eventually 848 emergency personnel were deployed to the scene, including all personnel available in Seoul and an addition of 140 vehicles and 346 firefighters from across the country. On arrival, first responders struggled to extract still-breathing victims from the crowd, which delayed critical first aid and resuscitation. An emergency message was issued to mobile phones in Yongsan, urging people to immediately return home because of an "emergency accident near Hamilton Hotel in Itaewon".

Emergency workers were not able to remove everyone from the crush until well after midnight. With resuscitation failing, bodies were laid on the streets by medical and police personnel and covered with blankets and clothing. Dozens of unconscious victims were eventually extracted from the crowd. Paramedics, police, and bystanders performed CPR on them. Videos on social media show bystanders dressed in costumes attempting to resuscitate the unconscious.

Eighty-three more ambulances arrived on site as late as 23:45. Many of the victims were transported to Soonchunhyang University Hospital near Itaewon.

US Army military police units of United States Forces Korea, who were conducting a routine patrol in the area with officers from the National Police Agency, assisted with first aid and maintaining public order on scene.

On 1 November, the government pledged to provide up to ₩15 million (US$11,191.72) in funeral expenses, and ₩20 million (US$14,922.3) in compensation. On 9 November 2022, a "one-stop" support center was opened for those affected by the incident.

== Victims ==
Confirmed fatalities (as of June 2026)
| Nationality | Fatalities | Ref. |
|---|---|---|
| South Korea | 134 | |
| Iran | 5 | |
| China | 4 | |
| Russia | 4 | |
| Japan | 2 | |
| United States | 2 | |
| Australia | 2 | |
| Austria | 1 | |
| France | 1 | |
| Kazakhstan | 1 | |
| Norway | 1 | |
| Sri Lanka | 1 | |
| Thailand | 1 | |
| Uzbekistan | 1 | |
| Vietnam | 1 | |
| Total | 162 | |

As of August 2026, the South Korean government has officially reported a death toll of 162; this figure includes later deaths in connection to the crush.

The death toll in the immediate aftermath was widely reported as 157, consisting of 102 females and 55 males. Of the victims, four were teenagers, ninety-six people were in their twenties, thirty-two people were in their thirties, nine were in their forties, and thirteen had yet to be identified. In addition, 27 foreigners were among the dead.

On 14 November, Yonhap News reported that the Central Disaster and Safety Countermeasures Headquarters had risen by one, to an official death toll of 158. On 12 December, a high school student was found dead in a Mapo District motel in a suspected suicide. The Ministry of Home Affairs and Security officially recognized him as the 159th death of the Itaewon disaster. In 2026, three additional suicides, two firefighters and a business owner, were recognised by the investigation panel as victims of the crowd crush, bringing the total death toll to 162.

On 11 November, the JoongAng Ilbo reported that at least 197 others were injured, including 32 in serious condition.

=== Identification of victims ===
The number of missing person reports filed on the following day grew from 355 to 4,024. Police said that they would identify the victims and relay information to family members.

By the afternoon of 30 October, about 90% of victims had been identified. The remaining 10% (12 bodies) were of local teens or foreign nationals. Officials said it was initially difficult to identify the deceased because of their Halloween costumes or because many were not carrying identification. The Hannam-dong Community Service Center served as a temporary missing persons center. Officials who usually deal with birth certificates or home registrations assisted in identifying victims. Workers at the center answered phone calls from the public regarding the missing. In just over seven hours, the center logged at least 3,580 call hours related to the incident.

One of the temporary morgues – the Wonhyoro sports center – was converted into a lost and found center for the identification of victims clothing and other items, with over 800 items recovered. Mobile phones and ID cards were kept at a local police station.

=== Mental health ===
Many survivors have subsequently suffered from post-traumatic stress disorder (PTSD). The National Center for Disaster and Trauma and local mental health welfare centers were treating (as of 13 December 2022) over 1,300 cases of surviving victims and survivors of the victims of the disaster. The Ministry of Interior and Safety said bereaved families of the victims will be eligible for the same state support, such as financial relief, as with other victims.

In October 2023, the South Korean government reported 1,316 firemen who responded to the incident still experienced psychological trauma. The National Fire Agency said, at the time, these individuals were undergoing treatment from complications.

=== Publication of the names of the fatalities ===
No official list of the deceased has been released. On 14 November 2022, a list of 155 names was published, but this was widely criticized. The list did not disclose personal information such as the victims' ages, or show their photos. The Minister of Public Administration and Security claimed that he did not have a list of deaths, a statement that controversially conflicted media reporting.

== Government response ==
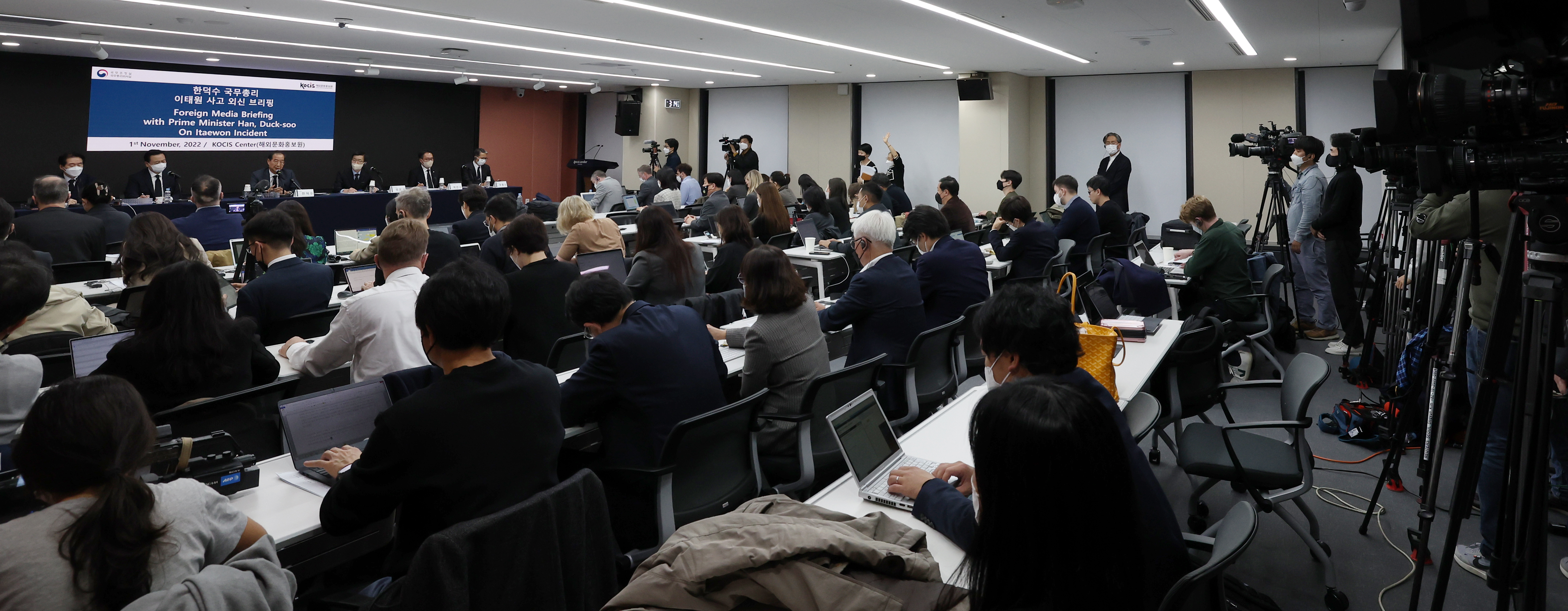
Foreign Media Briefing by Prime Minister Han Duck-soo

=== Immediate response ===
The day of the incident, President Yoon Suk Yeol attended an emergency briefing. He suggested swiftly treating the injured and reviewing the safety of festivity sites. He addressed the nation the following morning, and later visited the scene of the incident. The Mayor of Seoul, Oh Se-hoon, who was on a trip to Europe at the time of the incident, returned to Seoul.

In the days following the crush, interior minister Lee Sang-min offered an official apology and National Police Chief Yoon Hee-keun said, "There were several reports to the police just before the incident occurred and it was known that a massive crowd had gathered, indicating the urgency of the danger. However, information management was insufficient and there was no adequate reaction from the police".

Authorities did not immediately disclose what had caused the crush, but the chief of the Yongsan District Fire Department Choi Seong-bum said it was a "presumed stampede" and that many individuals fell. An official investigation was opened by the government, which promised new methods to prevent similar incidents. An investigation was also opened to determine if bars and clubs followed safety regulations.

On 1 November, government officials stated that it was not possible to predict the overwhelming crowd, but disaster prevention and urban planning experts refuted the government's position. They pointed out that authorities were aware of a large crowd due to the relaxation of COVID-19 rules, yet they deployed relatively few officers.

=== Investigation ===
The Korean National Police Agency (KNPA) launched an investigation into the crush within days of the event. On 13 January 2023, they announced their results. They found that the lack of safety precautions and other police errors contributed to the high number of victims. According to the KNPA, most of the deaths were caused by suffocation or brain swelling. According to the KNPA report, many died after falling and getting piled on top of them by other people from the crowd. South Korean police charged 23 officers, about half of them law enforcement officials, with involuntary manslaughter and negligence.

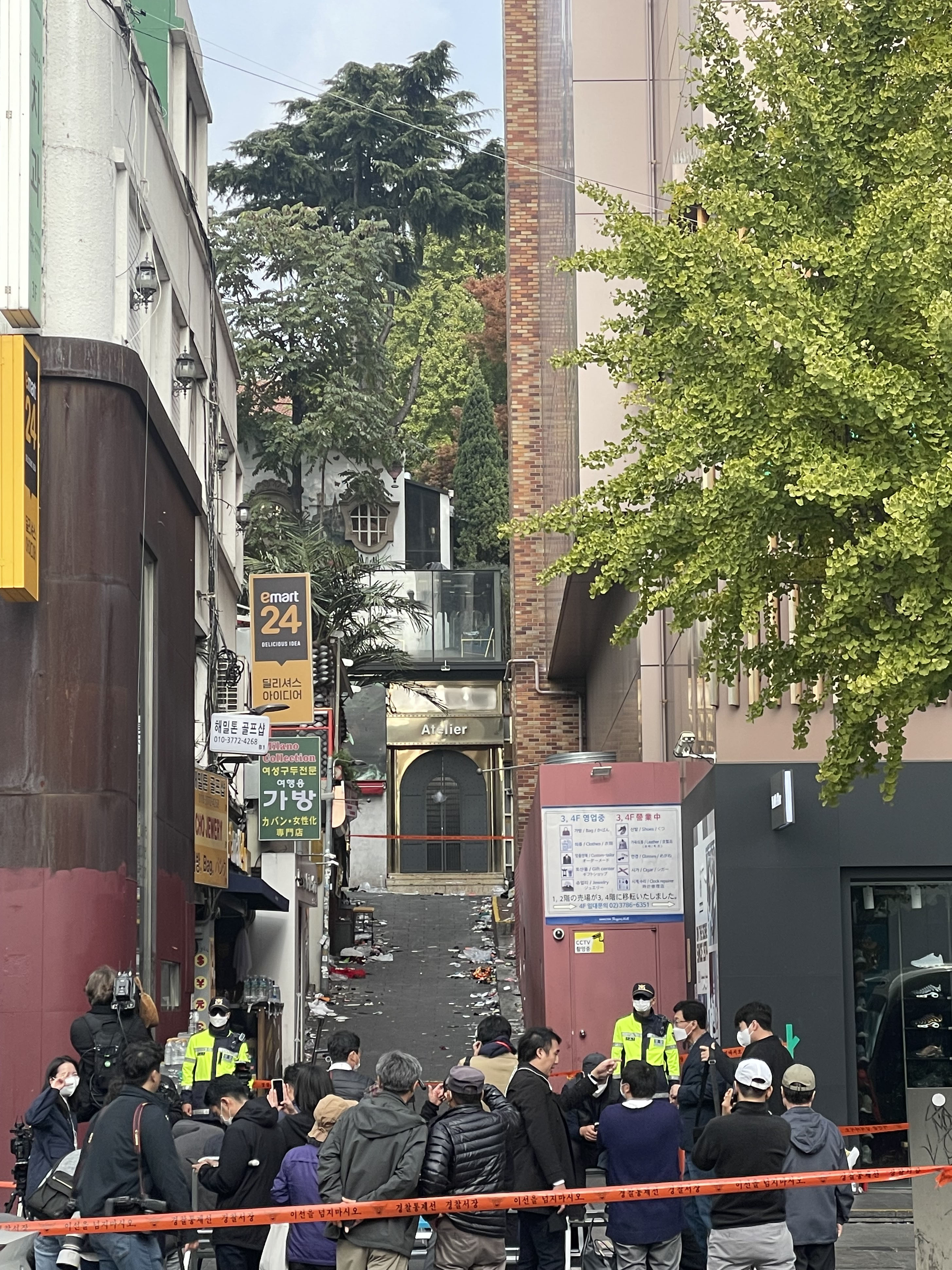
The alley where the crush took place, a few days afterwards (1 November 2022)

On 2 November 2022, the KNPA raided the city's police departments as part of the investigation. Investigative teams raided police units, fire departments, and offices to obtain documents for the investigation. An initial investigation uncovered that police did not respond appropriately to the emergency calls. Transcripts of the 11 calls made were released by the national police, noting that the Korean word which translates as "crushed to death" was used 13 times by callers. On 9 November, additional raids were made on the hotel adjoining the alley and two other locations, on suspicion that illegal extended structures from the buildings surrounding the alley had made it narrower over the years. On 11 November, a police officer at Yongsan Police Station committed suicide. He was being investigated on charges of abuse of authority, destruction of evidence and professional negligence for ordering the deletion of an internal intelligence report warning of the dangers of gathering crowds in Itaewon. That same day a senior official from the Seoul Metropolitan Government's safety support division was found deceased by an apparent suicide. While he had not worked at the disaster site nor was investigated by the police, he had been the final approver of documents for emergency checks on local safety measures and psychological counseling programs for the disaster. On 5 December, two former intelligence officers, Park Sung-min of the Seoul Metropolitan Government and Kim Jin-ho of Yongsan Police, were arrested on suspicion of destroying evidence related to the crush. According to CNN, they had ordered their subordinates to destroy an internal report about the risks of crowds in Itaewon on Halloween.

On 15 November, the firefighters' union sued the Interior Minister – who is responsible for public safety – in order to force the police to open an investigation on him. The union wanted to challenge a government statement that the night was not an organized event and therefore the responsibility of public safety was unclear.

On 20 January 2024, it was reported that the chief of the Seoul Metropolitan Police Agency, a former intelligence officer, Kim Kwang-ho, was charged with negligence for failing to ensure there were enough officers deployed on the ground at Itaewon on the incident night. On 14 February, a court sentenced Park Sung-min to 18 months imprisonment for destroying evidence and gave suspended sentences to Kim Jin-ho and to Kwang Yeong-sok, an officer at Yongsan police station, on the same charges.

On 30 September 2024, the Seoul Western District Court convicted three police officers, including the former head of Yongsan police station Lee Im-jae, of negligence over their handling of the disaster and sentenced them to up to three years imprisonment. The court also ruled that the crush was not a natural disaster and that the incident could have been prevented had the defendants performed adequate preparation, coordination and supervision over the event. On 17 October, Kim Kwang-ho was acquitted on negligence charges relating to the disaster, citing insufficient evidence.

=== Parliamentary inquiry ===
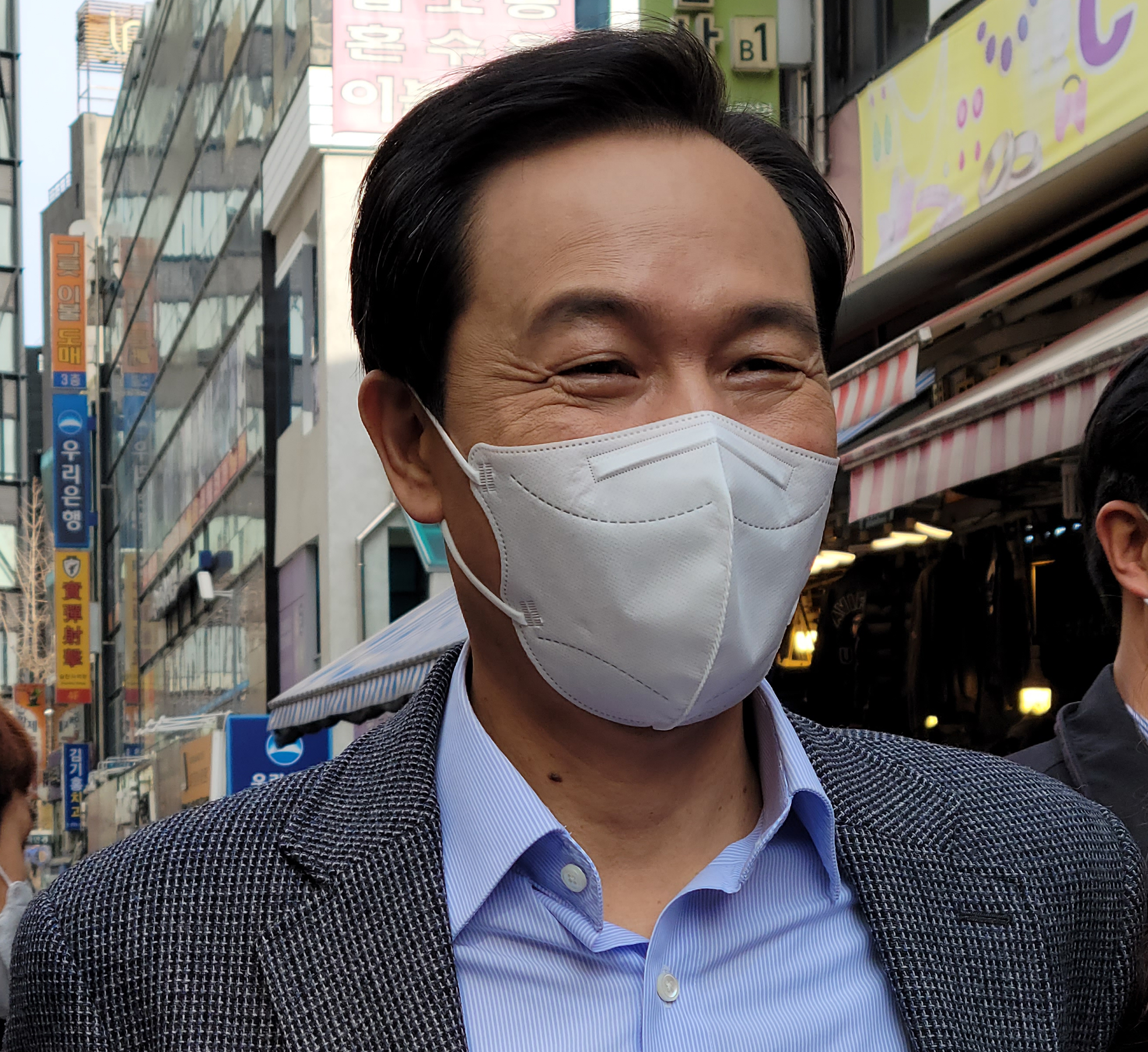
The head of the parliamentary special committee on the Itaewon crowd, Woo Sang-ho

On 9 November 2022, the opposition Democratic Party of Korea (DPK), the Justice Party and the Basic Income Party submitted formal requests for an investigation. On 23 November 2022, the ruling People Power Party (PPP) abandoned its previous opposition to a parliamentary inquiry, and ruling and opposition parties agreed to launch a parliamentary inquiry into the Itaewon Halloween disaster. On 19 December 2022, the Special Committee Inquiry into the Itaewon disaster was formally launched by the head of the Special Committee, MP Woo Sang-ho, in the National Assembly. On 10 January 2023, the parliamentary special committee to investigate the Itaewon disaster held a first public forum with experts on the issue.

== Criticism and protests ==
Unlike other mass calamity incidents that occurred internationally shortly before the 29 October 2022 Halloween disaster, such as the 2021 Astroworld Festival crowd crush in Houston, or the 2022 Kanjuruhan Stadium disaster in Malang, no official sponsors or organizers were associated with the Halloween celebrations in Itaewon.

Opinion polls conducted in November 2022 found that 7 out of 10 South Koreans believed that the government is responsible for the crush. However, there has been ongoing debate on how to assign blame.

=== Protests ===
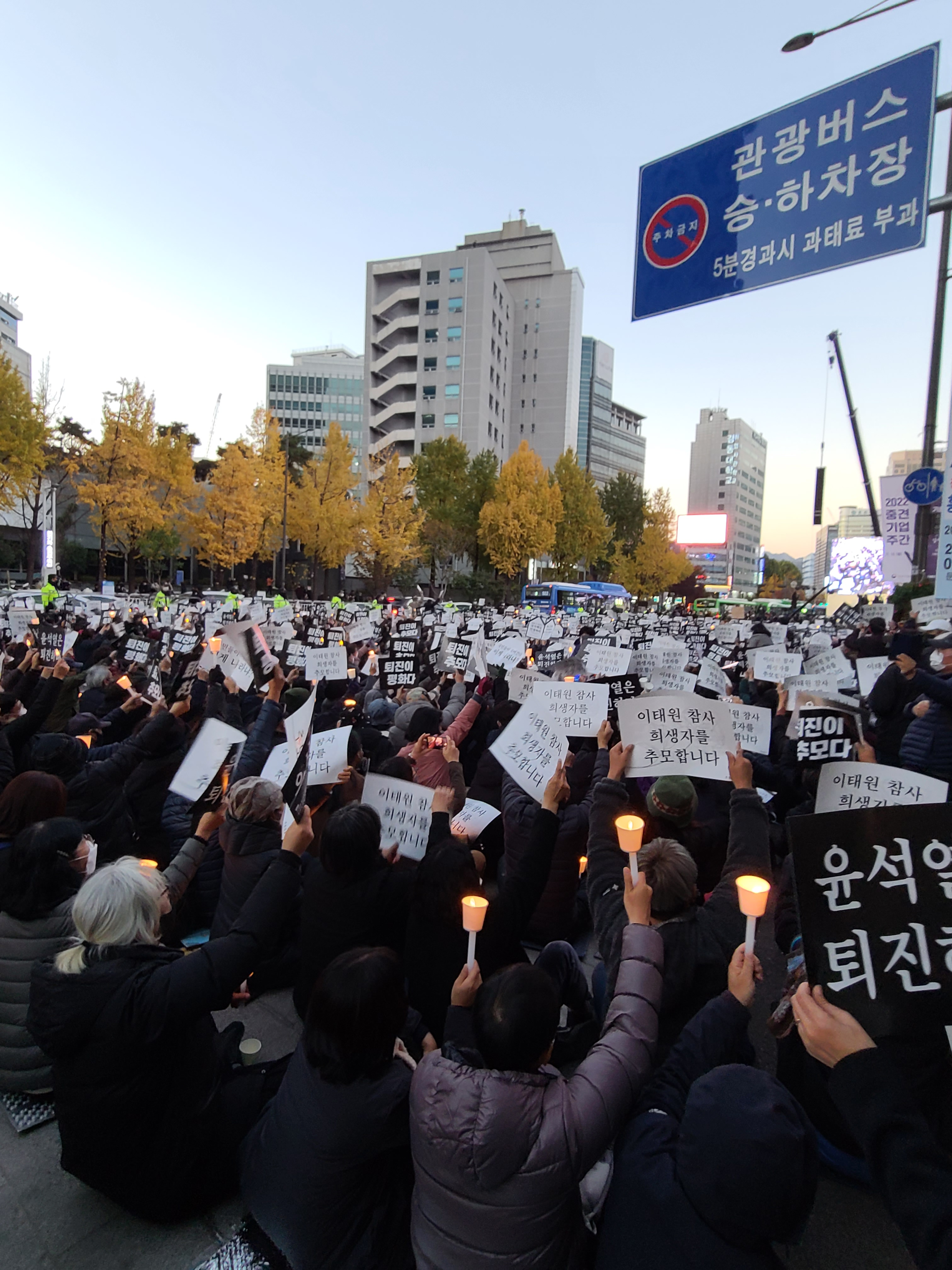

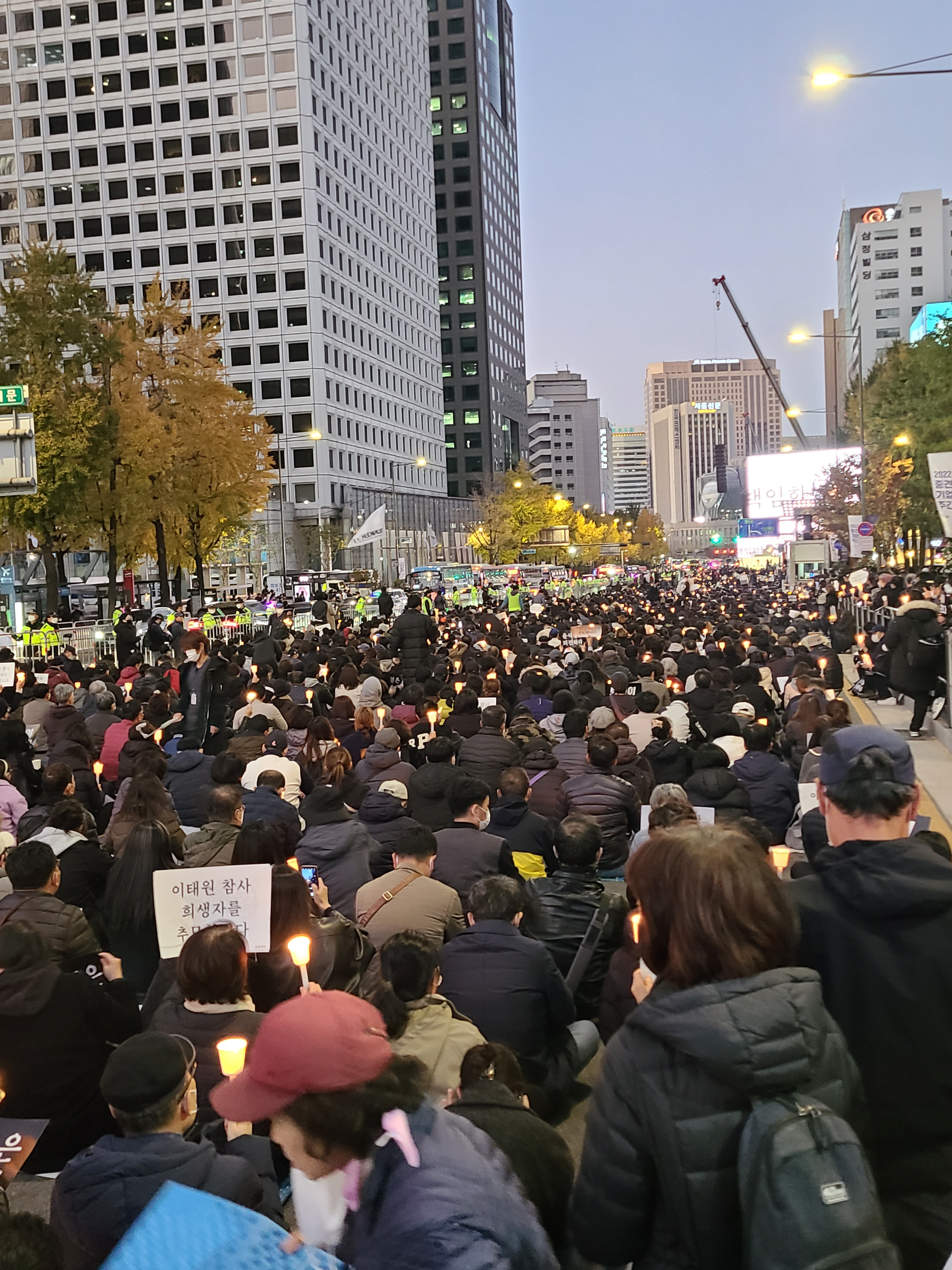
Candlelight vigil-protest for Itaewon disaster by the progressive group Candlelight Action, 5 November 2022

Protests were held throughout South Korea, including in Busan and Jeju Island. On 5 November, thousands gathered in central Seoul at a candlelight vigil organized by Candlelight Action, a civic group linked to South Korea's main opposition party. Many held signs that read: "Step down, Yoon Suk-yeol."

Young people protested government inaction near the site of the crush on Itaewon-ro. A fourteen-year-old protester interviewed by The Guardian noted that lack of preparation caused both the 2014 Sewol ferry disaster and the crush. Some held signs that read "It could have been prevented. The state was not there." or "6:34 pm" in reference to the first emergency call.

=== Criticisms of the investigation ===
The handling of the investigation has also been the subject of criticism. Some have accused the investigations of focusing too much on front line working officials and not any of the police chiefs, or the Ministry of Interior and Safety.

On 22 November, some relatives of victims held a press conference. A six-point proposal called for, among other things, a thorough investigation of those responsible and the avoidance of consequential damage. The press conference was organized by the non-profit advocacy group Lawyers for a Democratic Society, or "Minbyun". On 21 December 2022, the bereaved families of many of the victims of the Halloween disaster called for more and swifter justice and lamented the continuation of widespread "unaccountability". The police investigation was criticized by the bereaved for failing to hold top officials accountable.

=== Criticisms of the government ===
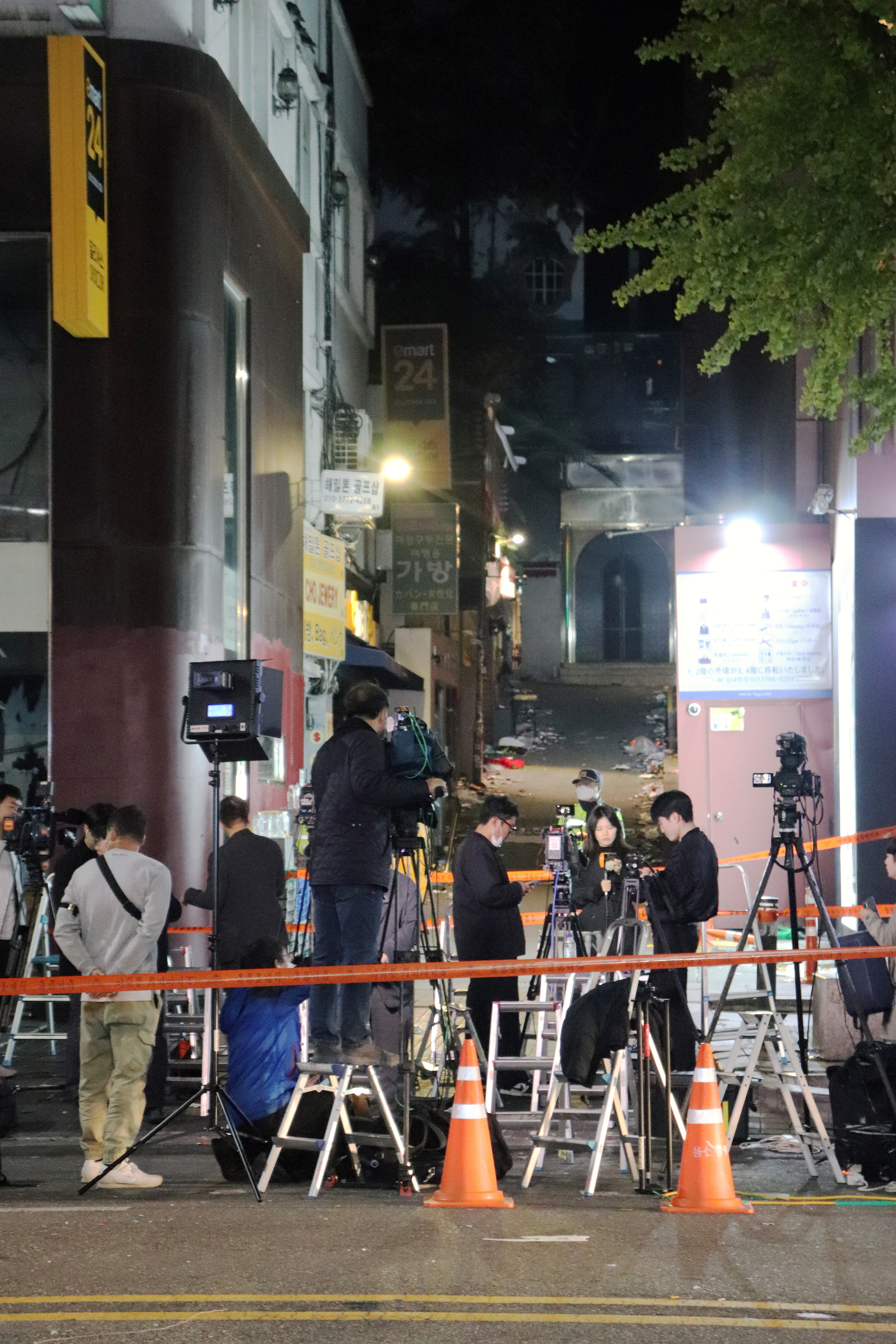
The Itaewon alleyway during the week-long national mourning, 31 October 2022

In early November, the South Korean state announced that it would use the term "accident" instead of "disaster" to avoid damaging Itaewon's reputation as a popular tourist destination. The decision caused public anger. Some alleged that the term "accident" failed to appropriately attribute responsibility to the government.

Regarding the young man who committed suicide weeks after the crush, the Prime Minister Han Duck-soo said of the victim, "Wouldn't it be better if he had been firmer and had a stronger desire to receive therapy?", causing controversy. The opposition parties criticized it as "a shocking absurd statement that blames the victim".

At the time of the disaster, officers at the Yongsan District Office allegedly worked on removing leaflets criticizing President Yoon Suk Yeol near the Samgak area of Seoul Subway Line 4, which some alleged may have delayed emergency response.

Both South Korean Minister of the Interior Lee Sang-min and the Interior Ministry's subordinate police have repeatedly acknowledged their roles in causing the incident. In a poll, more than half of South Koreans demanded the resignation of minister Lee. 57% of respondents said the government's investigation was insufficient. In February 2023, Lee was suspended from his position by the National Assembly for his handling of the disaster. He was succeeded by Han Chang-seob.

In addition, a document created by the police for the purpose of exploring the trends of bereaved families and civic groups related to the disaster after the disaster became controversial. The Kyunghyang Shinmun said in a report, "In this document, there are expressions that are reminiscent of the intelligence police's surveillance of civilians in the past." In this document, in relation to the Sewol ferry disaster in the past, a law was created to counter attempts to interpret the disaster as government responsibility.

A city council member belonging to the ruling party, the People's Power Party, became controversial because he spoke harshly to the bereaved family. In the messages posted on social media, city council member Kim Mi-na made comments such as 'a foolish mother', 'a trick to get a share by selling her children', and 'there is a sound of selling her children and doing business', which caused controversy. Public opinion grew that she should be removed from the council, but she was not expelled thanks to the protection of the PPP members who had a majority on the city council.

Afterwards, the government did not allow the bereaved families to hold a memorial service on the 100th day of the disaster.

After calls for an investigation by the families of victims, right wing provocateurs who perceived their advocacy as an attack on the government, verbally abused the mourners.

The report released on the first anniversary of the disaster shows that the manpower needed to control the crowd was not properly used to prevent a rally in front of the Yongsan presidential office targeting President Yoon Seok-yeol. The report cited the remarks of the intelligence officer in charge of Itaewon and stated, "When I said I would go to Itaewon that day, the intelligence officer said, 'What is there to do at the festival?' and ordered support at the rally site." Only opposition party leaders, including the Democratic Party of Korea, attended the memorial service commemorating the first anniversary of the disaster. Only some members of the leadership of the ruling People Power Party attended. Yongsan District Mayor Park Hee-young, a member of the PPP who did not attend the memorial service, drew criticism for attending an event to see off a group that opposed the memorial rally and attacked the bereaved family as 'outlaws' at the time.

Controversy has reignited over Yoon's handling of the crisis after former Speaker of the National Assembly Kim Jin-pyo published his memoirs on the matter on 27 June 2024, in which Kim claimed that he had spoken to Yoon over his handling of the disaster on 5 December 2022 and had tried to persuade Yoon to fire Lee Sang-min, who was Minister of the Interior and Safety at the time. According to Kim, Yoon replied that Kim was right, but that he had "strong suspicions" about the matter, couldn't "rule out the possibility" that the accident was "induced and manipulated by certain forces," and that it would be unfair to Lee to fire him in that case. Park Hong-keun, then Floor Leader of the Democratic Party, doubled down on Kim's claim, saying he had met Kim at the time and had written down what he had heard from Kim in a memo. According to Park, Yoon allegedly said that he could not understand that so many had flocked to Itaewon, which only had a few South East Asian restaurants, and that it was suspicious that left-wing media such as MBC, KBS, and JTBC had aired broadcasts from 2, 3 days before the incident inducing people to go there. Further, according to Park, Yoon said that he suspected a possibility that it was not an accident but a crime perpetrated by certain forces or actors. In response to Kim's claims, the Presidential Office has stated in an official statement on 27 June 2024 that "it is deplorable that a former National Assembly speaker would distort a private conversation with the president and reveal it to the public," adding that Yoon had ordered a complete investigation into every suspicion raised by the media on every occasion, that he had ordered the 911 emergency calls to be opened to the public and had recently accepted an independent counsel inquiry into the matter.

== Memorials ==
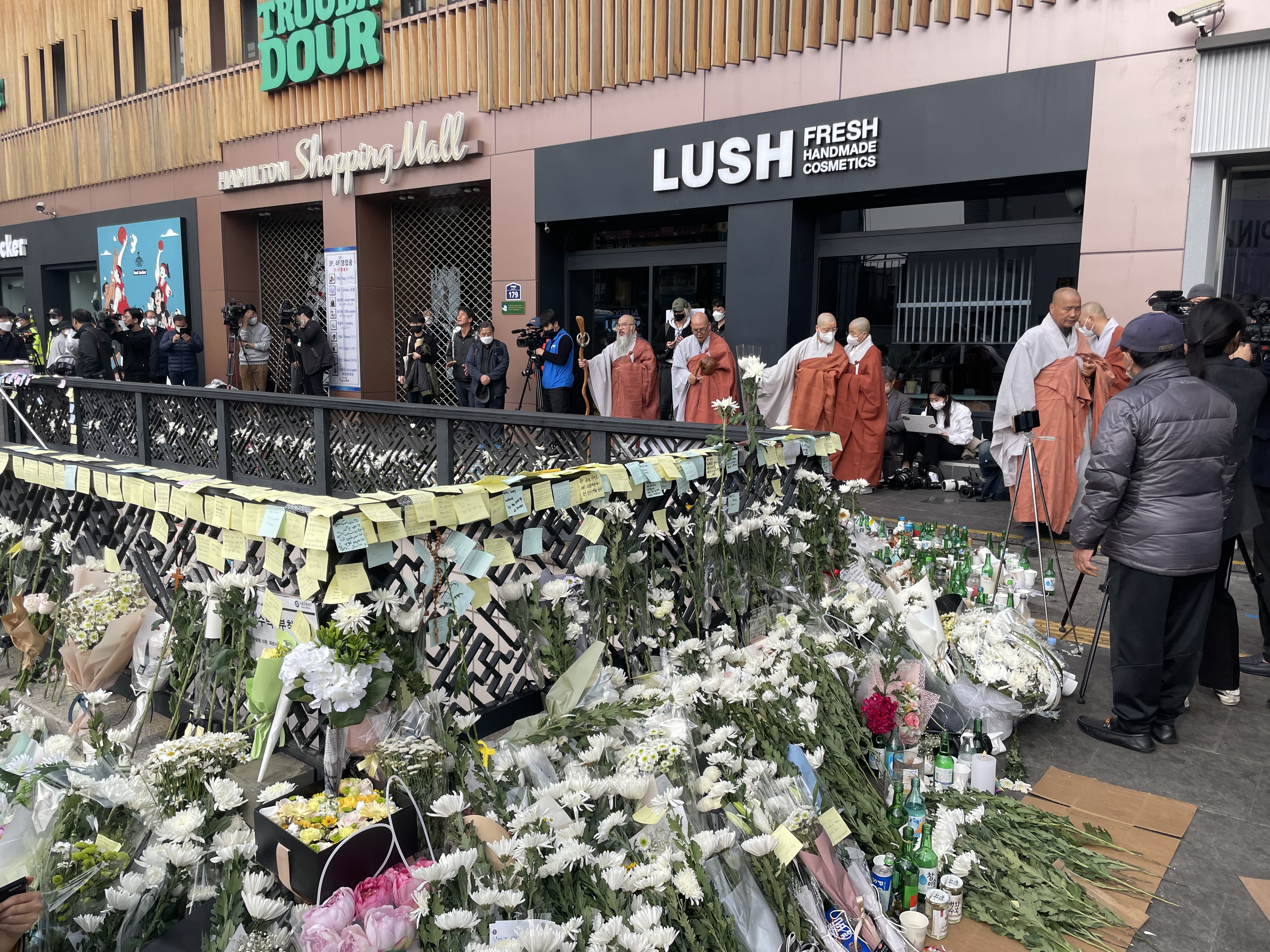
Itaewon Station Exit 1, Seoul

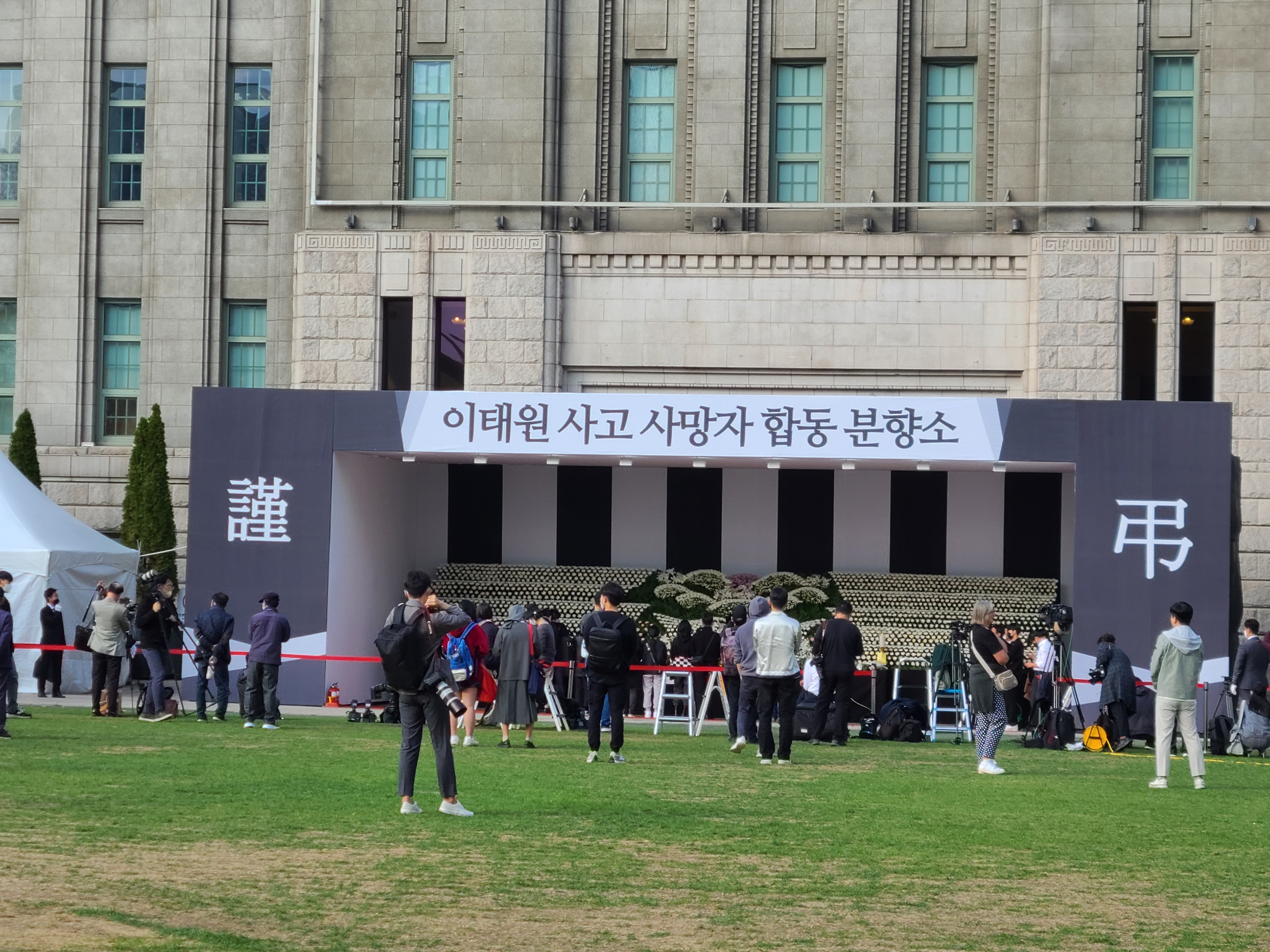
Seoul City Hall Plaza

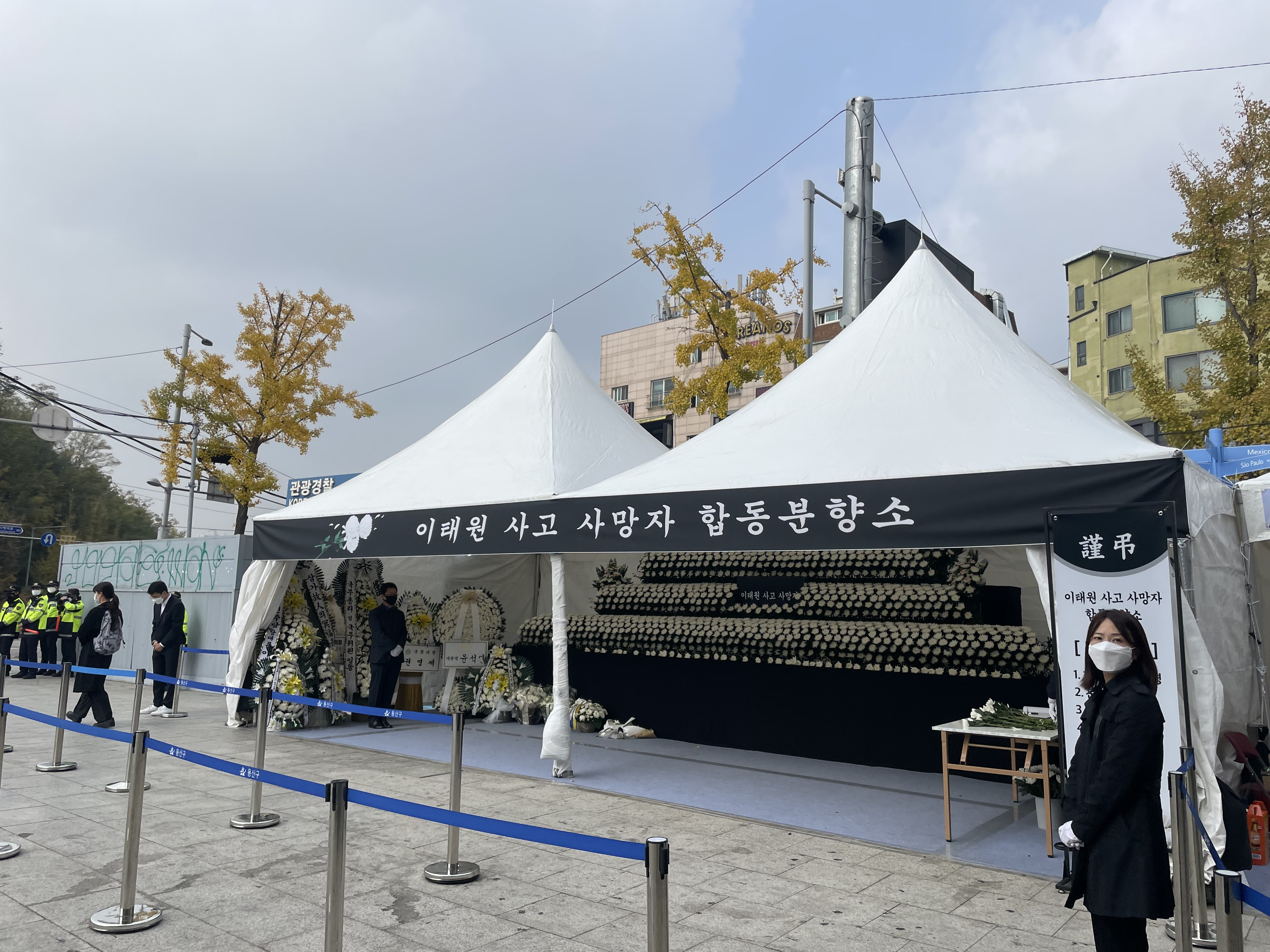
Noksapyeong Station, Seoul

Three memorials across the city.

=== Mourning and memorial sites ===
A week of national mourning until 5 November was declared by President Yoon, who ordered flags at government buildings and public offices to fly at half-mast.

On 31 October, about 4,000 people, including Seoul's mayor, the prime minister, and the president, attended a memorial at Seoul Plaza. The Yongsan District Office erected a memorial altar near Noksapyeong Station on 31 October. Memorials were established across 17 cities including Busan, Daegu and Incheon. The Health and Welfare ministry said psychological assistance would be provided at counseling booths at memorials in Seoul. Psychological assistance was also provided for schools where the victims studied.

By 13 November the initial memorial created around the exit 1 of Itaewon Station had expanded to cover about 20 meters of sidewalk from the station to the entrance of the alley where the disaster occurred. Many anonymous volunteers work together to keep the memorial in good shape and free of trash or rotting foods, as many leave food and drinks as offerings to the deceased normally via a ceremonial table. With the help of Yongsan District Official officials they have also coordinated to protect the memorial and offerings from any rain or other weather. Mourners had posted sticky notes all over the subway station exit. Hundreds of white chrysanthemum flowers were set up. Even after mid-December 2022, mourners around Itaewon subway station continued to pay tribute to the victims of the Halloween disaster by leaving flowers and expressions of condolence.

=== Buddhist orders ===
On 1 November, Buddhist monks and Sangha members gathered in central Seoul among representatives of South Korea's seven major religious orders to commemorate the people. The President of South Korea's largest Buddhist order, the Jogye Order, Ven. Jinwoo said, "Such a disaster should never happen again, and we pray for the rebirth of the victims in paradise." The delegates came from the Korean Conference of Religions for Peace, an advisory body representing the major religious communities in South Korea.

From 9 to 11 November, the Jogye Order Social and Labor Affairs Committee conducted Buddhist rites at Itaewon Station Exit 1, and called for an investigation into the disaster.

== Safety improvements ==
=== Seoul ===
In response to the disaster, the city created an automated system that monitors sidewalk crowding using 909 CCTVs in 71 areas (as of 2023) and artificial intelligence software. It raises alarms if it detects overcrowding, and there are large electronic overhead displays that direct pedestrians around crowded areas. The city also conducted a crowd crush training simulation, improved staffing and video capabilities for disaster management rooms, and began intense enforcement against illegal construction, roadside dumping, and sidewalk hazards like loose bricks. For subsequent Halloween celebrations in Itaewon, barriers were used to create one-way pedestrian flows, and passenger traffic from the subway was managed.

=== Tokyo ===
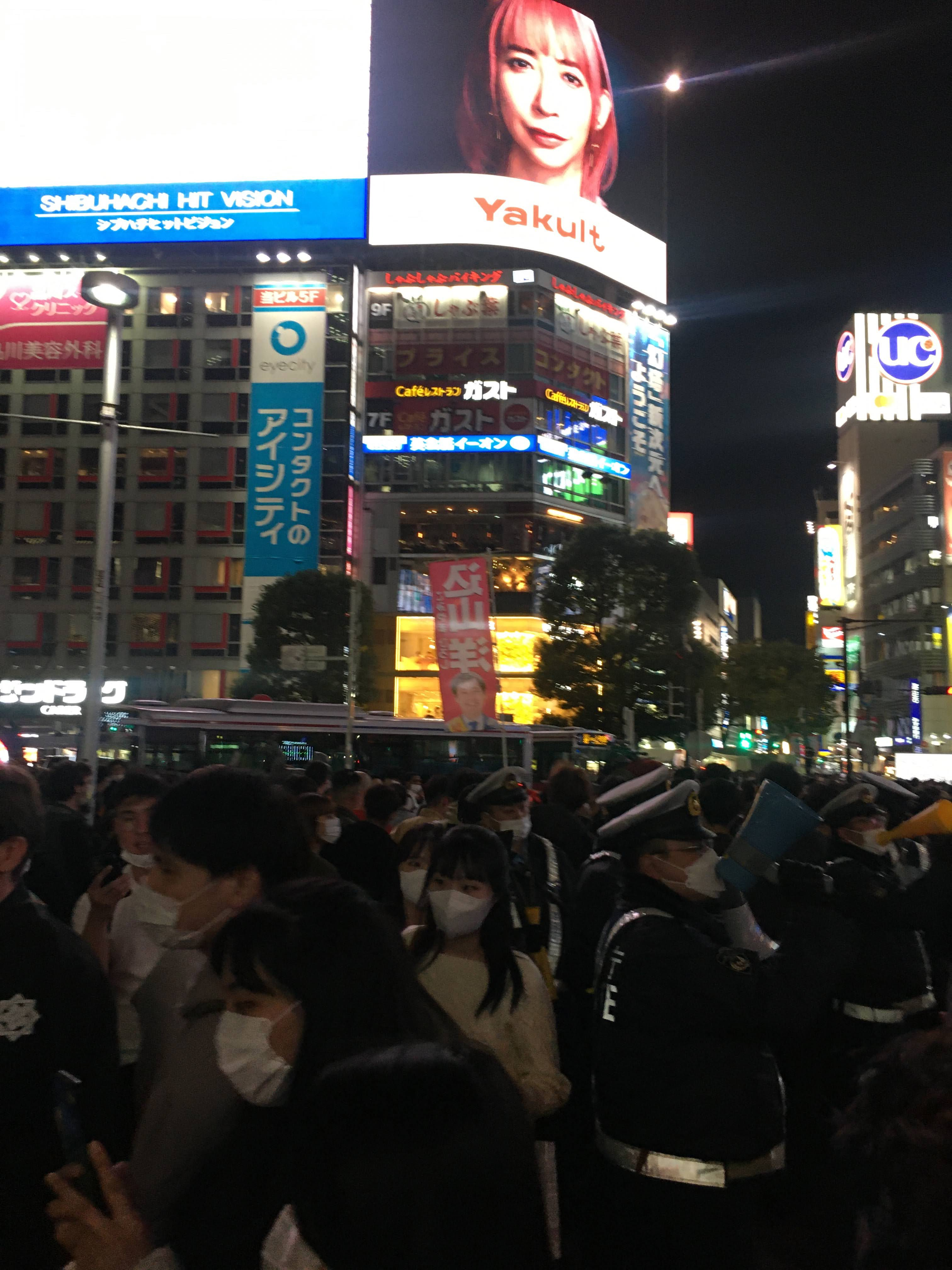
Police officers amidst the crowd on Shibuya Crossing

On Halloween 2022, the Japanese police had a more significant presence than usual in the Shibuya area of Tokyo. In particular, they urged people to keep moving at Shibuya Crossing, and formed human chains along the crosswalk. Police officers on raised platforms, dubbed by some as "DJ Police", issued continuous announcements. The following year, citing issues with litter, public intoxication, and property damage caused by unruly crowds and overtourism, Shibuya announced that it would officially discourage any gatherings at the crossing around Halloween, and that a large security presence would be employed to enforce the ordinance against public consumption of alcohol in the district around Halloween.

== Impact on businesses ==
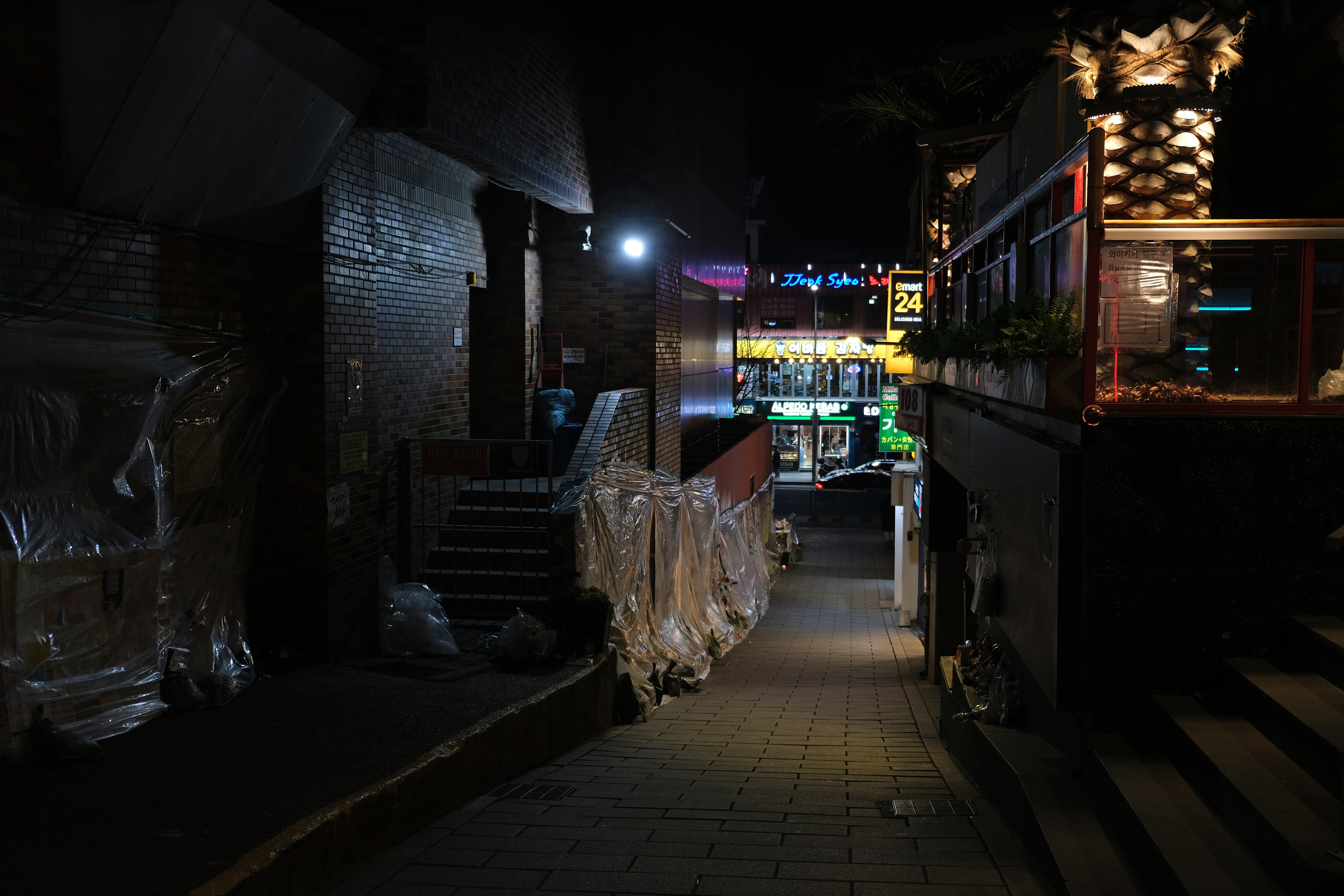
The alley over a month after the crush, on 1 December 2022

Business owners near the crush have raised fears that the area and its businesses would be affected by a stigma around nightlife in Seoul. During the 2022 Christmas season, businesses around Itaewon subway station and the World Food Culture Street area suffered from the effects of the Halloween disaster. Surrounding areas were also affected. Itaewon's 2022 holiday season was reported to have seen just 10% of the prior year's holiday season's traffic, while other popular Seoul nightlife districts such as Hongdae and Myeongdong saw heavy crowds. On 16 November, the Finance Ministry said that consumption at three major department stores had greatly slowed since October. Lee Eun Hee, professor of consumer studies at Inha University said, "When a business district starts to die for any reason, it collapses non-stop. Only when the sadness of the tragedy subsides and people realize that Itaewon as a whole is safe can the industrial park be revived."

Following the declaration of the week-long national mourning period, major broadcasting stations KBS, MBC, SBS, tvN, and JTBC suspended all of their music and entertainment programming beginning on 30 October, in favor of continuous news coverage. MBC also canceled the 2022 Qatar World Cup production presentation scheduled to be held on 1 November. In the music industry, concerts were cancelled and album release schedules of some artists were temporarily postponed.

South Korea's retail and entertainment sector withdrew Halloween-related products from shelves or canceled events. All festivals at theme parks, including Everland in Yongin and Lotte World in Jamsil, were canceled. Starbucks outlets stopped Halloween promotions and the sale of themed products. Convenience store chains, including CU and GS25, stopped selling Halloween-themed products online. SM Entertainment announced that its scheduled Halloween events would not take place. Entertainment companies such as SM Entertainment, YG Entertainment, JYP Entertainment, and Hybe Corporation, among others, announced the cancellation and postponement of various artist comeback schedules and events.

== In the media ==
Social media and online sites in South Korea issued statements to users to refrain from spreading any video footage or other information about the disaster. KakaoTalk, a messenger app widely used in Korea, issued a notice to all users, asking them to act with caution with information about the disaster, while Naver and Twitter also issued similar statements. Footage of the disaster and its aftermath was recorded and/or livestreamed and posted on a variety of different social media platforms, including TikTok. These videos were often not censored or edited for modesty or other reasons, compared to footage taken and shared by news outlets. This caused the South Korean Personal Information Protection Commission, Twitter, and two other online platforms, to announce their intention to search for and remove footage with personal identifying information in it.

On 23 November, a report in the Korea JoongAng Daily noted the emergence of a trend on social media platforms such as TikTok related to a "Itaewon Game" or "Itaewon Crush Game". The game, essentially a renaming of an existing game normally called the "Hamburger Game" or "Sandwich Game", involves players lying on top of each other to form a stack. The player on the bottom who can endure the most people on top wins the game. The trend was widely criticized.

A clip of a paramedic performing CPR while other bodies lay in the street, filmed on the night of the tragedy, was put into a montage sequence to the opening of the videogame Call of Duty: Modern Warfare 4 released in October 2026. The video game was released one week before the fourth anniversary of the crowd crush. After outcry from the victims' families, Call of Duty series publisher Activision apologized and confirmed that the scene will be removed in a November game update.

=== Disaster-related ethics guidelines ===
An official statement by the Korean Neuropsychiatric Association specifically highlighted the "horrific videos and photos" of the disaster that were being shared without any filtration, which could cause damage to others. By 8 November the Korea Communications Standards Commission was reportedly sent over 100 requests to have video and pictures related to the disaster taken down from social media sites. Additional concerns about the need to create disaster related ethics guidelines on digital content for social media sites and those that upload the footage. Koo Jeong-woo, professor of sociology at Sungkyunkwan University in Seoul, said, "For now, there are almost no guidelines on posting and sharing disaster footage on online platforms. Considering their far-reaching power of influence, these platforms should fulfill their social responsibility to come up with a manual." He further said, "Those who upload such content as well as those who consume it should also take efforts to keep a sense of ethics and consume digital content responsibly."

By 2 November, there were ten times as many searches for the National Center for Disaster and Trauma as there had been one week earlier on Google Korea; searches for the related phrases trauma center and trauma symptoms also increased. Chae Jeong-ho, professor of psychiatry at the College of Medicine of the Catholic University of Korea and president of the Korea Society for Traumatic Stress Studies, said, "You didn't have to be there to experiencing trauma". According to the Frontiers in Psychology journal, "Mass trauma or collective trauma is defined as the psychological response of an entire group to a traumatic event that affects society as a whole."

== Academic analysis ==
According to experts, once a crush is already in progress it is extremely difficult to stop, and the real issue is not the number of security personnel but adequate training in crowd control, as well as the necessity of monitoring and dispersing crowds well before they reach dangerous levels. Experts on crowd safety explained that when crowd density exceeds eight to nine persons per square metre, a crowd can rapidly destabilize to the point where individuals can no longer escape. When a crowd crush suddenly develops in that fashion, persons trapped in the crowd will begin to lose consciousness within 30 seconds, and if not freed immediately, will be dead from compressive asphyxiation within six minutes.

Experts such as Milad Haghani (University of Melbourne), Edwin Galea (University of Greenwich) or John Drury (University of Sussex) took the view just a few days after the accident that labels such as "stampede" prevalent in the media were incorrect as they presupposed that people in the crowd had space to move.

According to Juliette Kayyem, a disaster management expert and international security professor at the Harvard Kennedy School, no specific triggering event needs to have happened to explain the Itaewon Halloween celebration tragedy. In her estimation, what she believed to be factors such as the large crowd, narrow streets and lack of public safety were enough. Kayyem drew parallels between the Itaewon Halloween disaster and the Bethnal Green disaster of 1943, in which an air raid in London killed 174 people on the steps leading to the underground station.

== See also ==
- List of fatal crowd crushes
- List of man-made disasters in South Korea
- List of accidents and disasters by death toll
