= Bumin Hospital Group of Indang Medical Foundation =

Bumin Hospital
- Indang Medical Foundation

Geography
- Location: Seoul, Busan, South Korea

Organisation
- Type: General, Teaching

Services
- Standards: Accredited by Ministry of Health & Welfare for Patient Safety and Service Quality, Certified Joint Specialty Hospital by Ministry of Health & Welfare
- Emergency department: Regional Emergency Center
- Beds: 921

History
- Founded: 1985

Links
- Website: http://buminweb.co.kr/eng/
- Lists: Hospitals in South Korea

The Bumin Hospital Group (often spelled as Boomin Hospital) is the leading general hospital group specializing in orthopedic treatment of spine and joint disorders in Korea. The group operates four hospitals of 1000 beds in Seoul and Busan. Bumin was designated as a “Joint Specialized Hospital” by the Ministry of Health and Welfare, and it is the largest joint specialty hospital in Korea. Bumin Hospital was also accredited as the “Official Orthopedic Teaching Hospital” and “Certified Medical Institution for Patient Safety and Healthcare Quality” by the Ministry of Health and Welfare of Korea.

Bumin Hospital focuses on providing subspecialized orthopedic care to its patient with its medical staff with a subspecialty treating in the field of knee, shoulder, hip, foot and ankle. Along its specialty in joint treatment, additional areas of expertise include spine surgery, rehabilitation medicine, and pain management. Its spine center has long-standing experience and expertise in Minimally Invasive Spinal Surgery, and spine specialists treat patients with congenital or acute spinal disorders and with chronic back pain. For specialized rehabilitation treatment, Busan Bumin Hospital and Seoul Bumin Hospital operate dedicated rehabilitation center, where rehabilitation specialist performs physio therapy, Medx Physical Therapy, and Chiropractic therapy. Gupo Bumin Hospital is a specialized medical center focusing on rehabilitation of neurological disorders and chronic medical diseases.

== History ==
In 1985, Chung Orthopedics Clinic was founded by Dr. Hung Tae Chung in Busan, Korea. In 1996, the clinic was renamed as Bumin Hospital and opened Spine Health Research Center and Joint Medical Science Research Center.

In 2008, Bumin Hospital opened its second hospital in Busan, Gupo Bumin Hospital, specializing in rehabilitation. In 2011, Bumin Hospital opened third hospital, Seoul Bumin Hospital.

Dr. Hung Tae Chung founded Indang Medical Foundation, non-profit organization, in 2008. Bumin Hospital Group became part of Indang Medical Foundation.

== Bumin Hospital Group Network ==
=== Busan Bumin Hospital ===
Busan Bumin Hospital is the first opening hospital of Bumin Hospital Group and was founded in 1985. It is a general hospital specialized in orthopedic medical services, and it was accredited as a “Joint Specialty Hospital” by the Ministry of Health and Welfare. With 399 beds, Busan Bumin Hospital is the largest joint specialized hospital in South Korea. The hospital is an orthopedic training hospital with residents and fellows, and it was certified by the Ministry of Health and Welfare for its high quality of healthcare services and its high standards in patient safety protocols.

Medical Centers

- Joint Center
- Spine Center
- Trauma Center
- Rehabilitation Center
- Digestive Organ Center
- Hand & Foot Center
- Artificial Kidney Center
- Health Screening Center
- Emergency Center

=== Seoul Bumin Hospital ===
Seoul Bumin Hospital was opened in 2011, and it is a general hospital specialized in orthopedic medical services. Seoul Bumin Hospital has 218 beds, and was certified by the Ministry of Health and Welfare for its high quality of healthcare services and its high standards in patient safety protocols in 2012. Seoul Bumin Hospital has also certified as "Outstanding Laboratory Medicine Center" by the Korean Society for Laboratory Medicine.

Medical Centers

- Joint Center
- Spine Center
- Trauma Center
- Rehabilitation Center
- Digestive Organ Center
- Hand & Foot Center
- Artificial Kidney Center
- Health Screening Center
- Emergency Center

=== Gupo Bumin Hospital ===
Gupo Bumin Hospital is located in Busan and it is a rehabilitation specialized medical center. With rehabilitation specialists and orthopedic specialists, it offers customized rehabilitation services to patients.

Rehabilitation Program

- Pediatric Rehabilitation
- Heat and Electro Therapy Rehabilitation
- Hypermobility Evaluation
- Language Rehabilitation

=== Haeundae Bumin Hospital ===
Opened in July, 2015, Haeundae Bumin Hospital offers a general hospital medical services while specializing in orthopedic treatment. Haeundae is one of the top destination places in Korea, known for its beautiful beach. Haeundae Bumin Hospital is currently operating 201 inpatient bed units.

Medical Centers

- Joint Center
- Spine Center
- Sports Medicine Center
- Sports Rehabilitation Center
- Neurology & Neurosurgery Center
- Digestive Organ Center
- Health Screening Center
- Emergency Medical Center
- International Medical Center

== Research ==
Spine Health Research Center, Joint Medical Science Research Center and Medical Device Clinical Trial Center actively conduct orthopedic research projects. The latest research findings are published in medical journals and presented at international conferences.

- 2012 Differences in measurement of lower limb alignment among different registration methods of navigation and radiographs in TKA using the OrthoPilot system - Orthopedics
- 2012 Chronic pure radiculopathy in patient with organizing epidural hematoma around C8 nerve root - European Spine Journal
- 2012 Factors Affecting the Accurate Placement of Percutaneous Pedicle Screws during Minimally-Invasive Transforaminal Lumbar Interbody Fusion - European Spine Journal
- 2011 Subsidence of PEEK cage in Minimally - Invasive Transforaminal Lumbar Interbody Fusion - Journal of Spinal Disorders & Techniques
- 2011 The Clinical and Radiological Outcomes of Minimally Invasive Transforaminal Lumbar Interbody Single Level Fusion - ASIAN SPINE JOURNAL
- 2011 Is It Real False Negative Finding in Motor Evoked Potential Monitoring during Corrective Surgery of Ankylosing Spondylitis? - ASIAN SPINE JOURNAL

== Accreditation & awards ==
2012 Certified Medical Institution for Patient Safety and Healthcare Quality - Accredited by Ministry of Health and Welfare of Republic of Korea

2011 Joint Specialty Hospital - Accredited by Ministry of Health and Welfare of Republic of Korea

2011 Korean Global Medical Service Award - Winner of Specialist Hospital Division

2010 Korean Global Medical Service Award - Winner of Specialist Hospital Division

2009 Excellent Medical Institution by the Ministry of Health & Welfare
