= Lee Seo-yi =

South Korean actress (1982–2025)

- 이서이
- Born: April 18, 1982; Seoul, South Korea
- Died: June 20, 2025 (aged 43); Dongjak-gu, Heukseok-dong, Seoul, South Korea
- Education: Pusan National University - Master (graduated)
- Occupation: Actress
- Years active: 2013–2025

Lee Seo-yi (Korean: 이서이; April 18, 1982 – June 20, 2025) was a South Korean actress who appeared in film and television, most notably drama shows. She was best known in films such as The King (2017), Are You Still in Love? (2019), and TV dramas like Hur Jun, The Original Story (2013) and Cheongdam-dong Scandal (2014).

On June 20, 2025, Lee Seo-yi died at the age of 43 at Chung-Ang University Hospital.

== Education ==
- Hankuk University of Foreign Studies, The Department of Czech and Slovak Studies (graduated)
- Pusan National University (graduated)

== Filmography ==
=== Film ===
- Scarlet Innocence (2014, CJ ENM Films & Television) – Female college student 2
- The Royal Tailor (2014, Showbox) – Female aristocrat 3
- The King (2017, Next Entertainment World) – Yeon Soo-won
- Are You Still in Love? (2019) – Lee Jae-soon
- Killing Romance (2023, Lotte Entertainment) – Kim Beom-woo's older sister 1

=== Dramas ===
- Hur Jun, The Original Story (2013, MBC)
- A Hundred Year Legacy (2013, MBC)
- Cheongdam-dong Scandal (2014, SBS) – Yoon-joo
- City of the Sun (2015, MBC Dramanet) – Seo-yi
- Bravo My Life (2017, SBS) – Do-hyun's coordinator
- Special Law of Romance (2017, web drama) – Female judge
- Pegasus Market (2019, tvN) – Mi-joo's mother
- The Divorce Insurance (2025, tvN) – Female baker
