= Hamchoon =

Hamchoon may refer to these things:

- Hamchoon-Won, a royal garden, built in 1493 C.E., that had been attached to the east of Changdeokgung Palace, Seoul, South Korea
- Hamchoon Women's Clinic, a specialized clinic for infertility and genetic testing in Seoul, Republic of Korea
