= Choi Sae-hwang =

South Korean lawyer and civil servant (1919–1992)

5th Chief Prosecutor of Jeonju
- In office 18 July 1952 – 6 April 1954

8th Vice-Minister of National Defense
- In office 8 August 1957 – 27 May 1960

Personal details
- Born: 30 August 1919 Sariwon, Kōkai Province, Korea, Empire of Japan
- Died: 11 October 1992 (aged 73) Seoul, South Korea

Korean name
- Hangul: 최세황
- Hanja: 崔世璜
- RR: Choe Sehwang
- MR: Ch'oe Sehwang

Choi Sae-hwang (Korean: 최세황; Hanja: 崔世璜; 30 August 1919 – 11 October 1992) was a South Korean lawyer and government official.

== Early life ==
Choi was born in Sariwon, Hwanghae Province (today North Hwanghae Province, North Korea). He graduated from the Faculty of Law of Chuo University in Tokyo, Japan in 1941.

== Government career ==
After his graduation, Choi returned to Korea, where he worked as a prosecutor of the Cheongju District Court under the Japanese colonial government. When Korea regained its independence, he found employment with the new South Korean government, first with the High Prosecutors' Office in 1948, with the Supreme Prosecutors' Office in 1949, as head of the Bureau of Prisons (행형국) under the Ministry of Justice in 1951, and as Chief Prosecutor of Jeonju in 1952. He was named South Korea's Vice-Minister of National Defense in August 1957, succeeding Kim Jeong-ryeol who was promoted to Minister. He was one of the members of the founding committee of the Democratic Republican Party in February 1963. The Ministry of Foreign Affairs appointed him as a representative in South Korea's discussions with Japan on a fisheries treaty that month.

== Later life ==
Choi went on to work as a lawyer in private practice, and later became the president of Hansung Transportation (한성통운; 韓星通運).

Choi was an avid golfer. He became a member of the board of directors of the Seoul Country Club in 1969, and was elected chairman of the board in 1980.

He died on the morning of 11 October 1992 at the Chung-Ang University Hospital in Seoul. He was survived by his wife Kim Yeong-ja, two sons, and two daughters.
