= Seoul St. Mary's Hospital =

- Catholic Medical Center

Geography
- Location: 222, Banpo-daero, Seocho-gu, Seoul, South Korea
- Coordinates: 37°30′05.8″N 127°00′17.2″E

Organisation
- Type: Teaching
- Religious affiliation: Roman Catholic
- Affiliated university: Catholic University of Korea

Services
- Beds: 1,267

History
- Former name: Kangnam St. Mary's Hospital
- Opened: 1980

Links
- Website: cmcseoul.or.kr www.instagram.com/seoulstmarys.official/
- Lists: Hospitals in South Korea

The Catholic University of Korea, Seoul St. Mary's Hospital (SSMH; Korean: 가톨릭대학교 서울성모병원) is the representative teaching and research hospital of the Catholic University of Korea's College of Medicine located in Seoul, South Korea. SSMH operates under the Catholic Medical Center (CMC), which owns eight subsidiary hospitals and seven research centers in Korea.

In March 2023, the hospital was ranked 91st among over 2,300 hospitals in the world.

== History ==
Seoul St. Mary's Hospital was established in 1980 as "Kangnam St. Mary's Hospital," the first general hospital in the Gangnam area. In March 2009, the hospital was renamed Seoul St. Mary's Hospital, and a new building with a total floor area of 190,000 square meters was constructed. The new hospital had 22 floors above and six underground floors, providing 1,200 beds. At that time, it was the largest single hospital in Korea.

== See also ==
- Catholic University of Korea St. Vincent's Hospital
- List of hospitals in South Korea
- Healthcare in South Korea
- Catholic Church and health care
