= Soonchunhyang University =

Private university in Asan, South Korea

- 순천향 대학교 順天鄉大學校
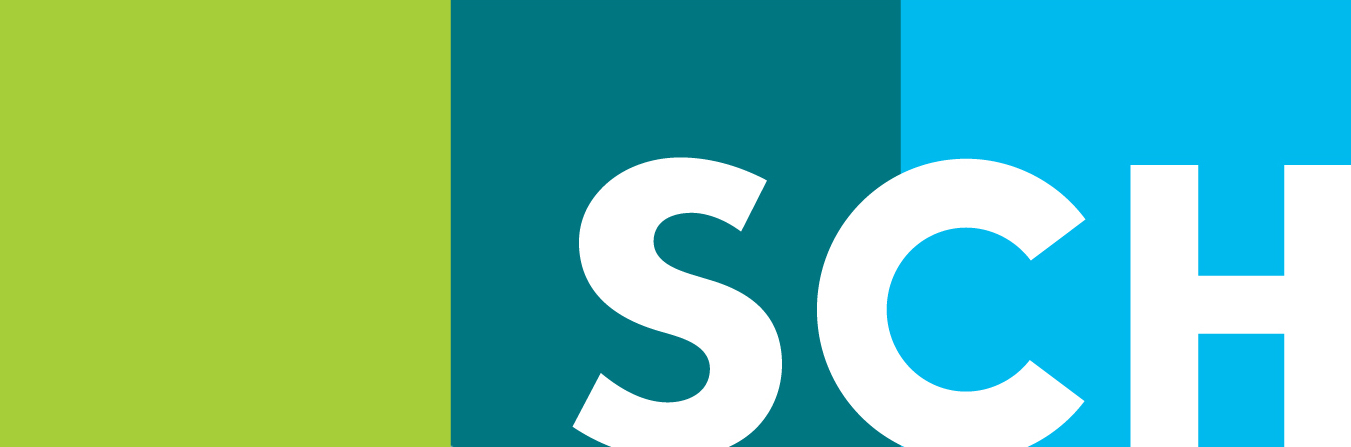
- Motto: Truth, Service, Performance"
- Type: Private
- Established: 1978
- President: Kyoil Suh
- Faculty: 765 (Full-time)
- Administrative staff: about 200
- Undergraduates: 15,675 (2010)
- Postgraduates: 1,196 including doctoral (2010)
- Location: 646 Eupnaeri, Sinchang-Myeon, Asan-Si, Chungnam-do, South Korea, Sinchang-myeon, Asan, South Korea; 36°46′15″N 126°55′54″E
- Campus: Urban
- Mascot: phoenix
- Website: sch.ac.kr homepage.sch.ac.kr/english/

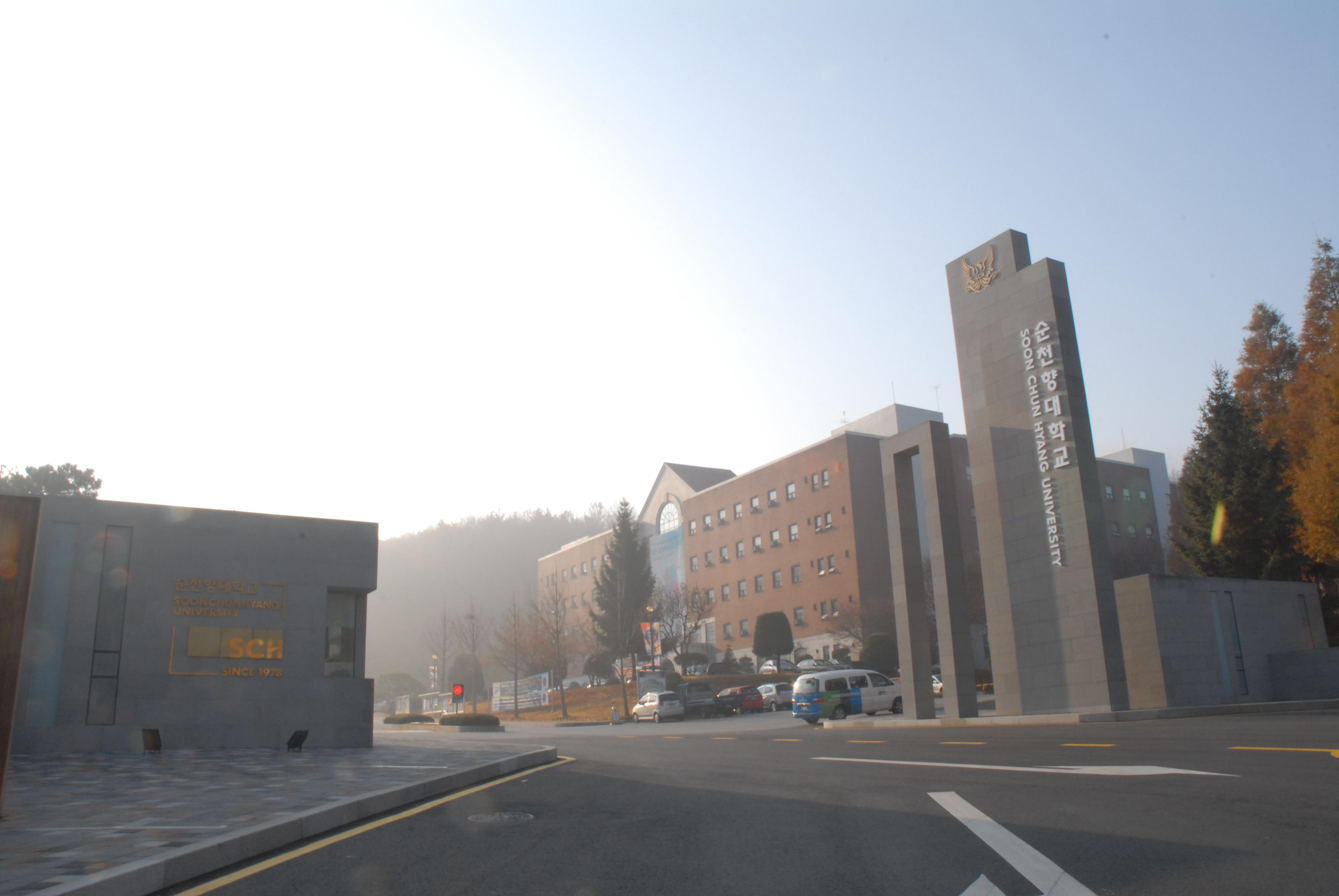
The west door of Soonchunhyang University

Soonchunhyang University (SCH) is a private university in Asan, South Korea.

Soonchunhyang University has a strength in the field of medicine, based on a Soonchunhyang University Hospitals. It ranked 9th among universities in South Korea, in the category of Clinical, Pre-Clinical & Health by Times Higher Education World University Rankings in 2023.

== History ==
The name 'Soonchunhyang' (순천향) means 'the peaceful hometown complying with the will of heaven'. The university's founder, Dr. Succ-Jo Suh named the school to reflect his philosophy in medical practices that "heaven will cure diseases; doctors only help the curing process".

Soonchunhyang University was founded by Dr. Succ-Jo Suh in 1978, as a College of Medicine with 80 students. It emerged as a university based on Soonchunhyang Hospital, which was established in 1974. While initially established with the purpose of training medical professionals, the university gradually developed into a comprehensive university over time, offering both undergraduate and graduate programs.

University rankings

Regional – Overall
- QS Asia: =288 (2025)

SCH received the 'National Award for Educational Reform Excellence' from the Korean Ministry of Education, Science and Technology in 2008, 2009, and 2010.

In 2017, the university was under scrutiny for their ties to ex-president Park Geun-hye during the court proceedings during the Impeachment of Park Geun-hye. The University President, Gyo-il Seo, allegedly received bribes for development from the President's office and Department of Education while university doctors prescribed President Park with illegal sleep medicines. Soonchunhyang University's support from the Ministry of Education increased from 7 billion won in 2012 and 4.5 billion won in 2013 to 8.1 billion won in 2014, 9.2 billion won in 2015, and 23.5 billion won in 2016 when the Park Geun-hye administration took office. This caused the university to lose public funding when Moon Jae-in was inaugurated, in turn causing the university to downscale and close its Department of Education.

On 8 February 2024, the Government of the Republic of Korea gave Soonchunhyang University a 1-year ban on the recruitment of international students as a result of an investigation following the unlawful forced deportation of 21 Uzbek students from Hanshin University. The government sited irregularities in the visa process, illegal stay ratio of students, failure rate of international students in Korean language courses, illegal employment of foreign students, and other factors prompted the government to ban Soonchunhyang for one year starting in the fall 2024 semester.

Soonchunhyang University has achieved remarkable results in THE World University Rankings, ranking 5th in Korea and within the Top 100 globally in the World University Impact Rankings. Additionally, in THE World University Rankings by Subject (Medicine), the university ranked 10th in Korea and within the Top 400 worldwide, in 2024.

== Undergraduate colleges ==
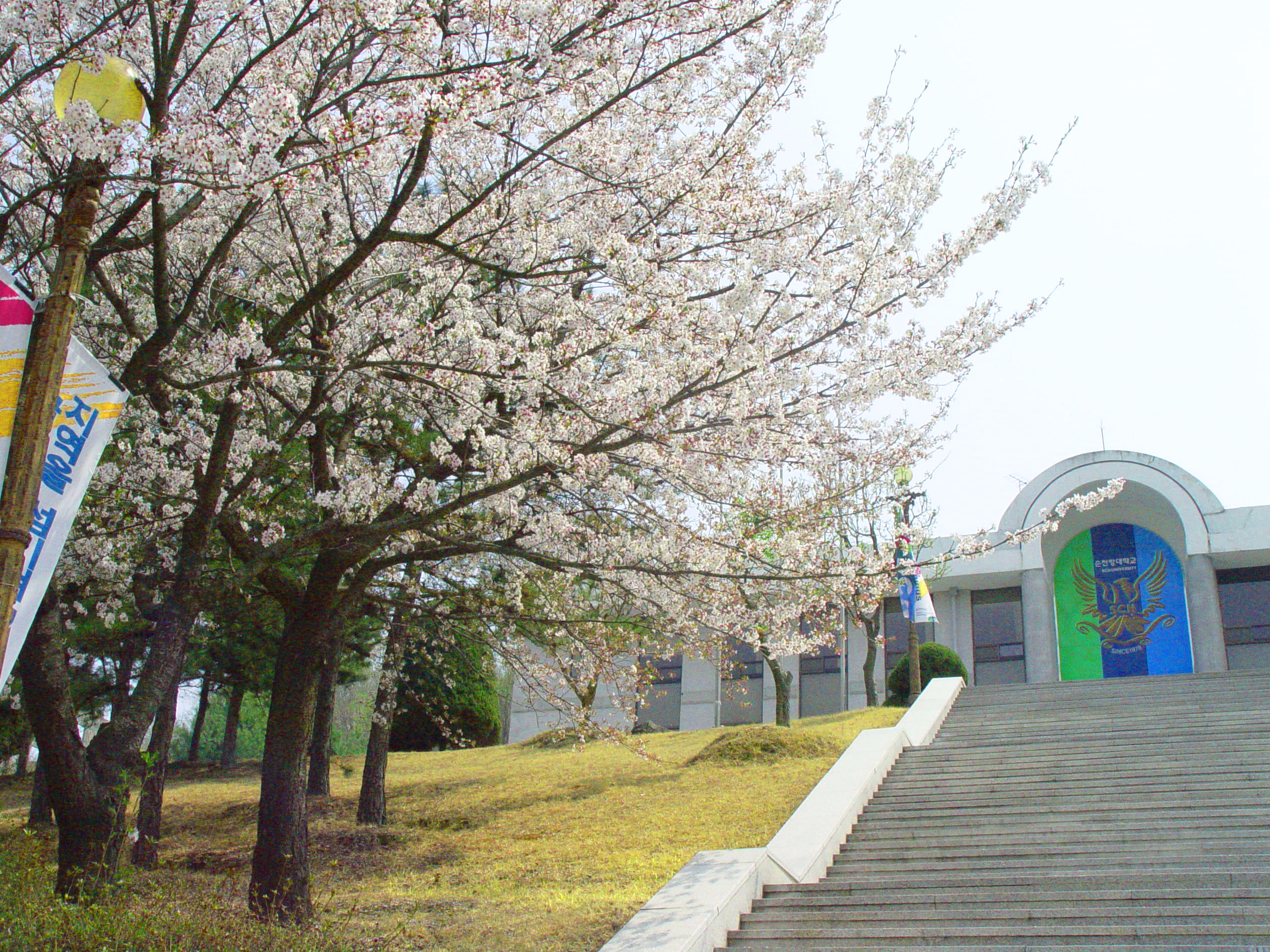
The Flower & Administrative Office of Soonchunhyang University

- College of Humanities and Social Sciences
- College of Natural Sciences
- College of Engineering
- College of Software Convergence
- College of Medical Science
- College of Medicine
- College of Global Business
- SCH MediaLabs
- College of Hyangseol Nanum

== Graduate schools ==
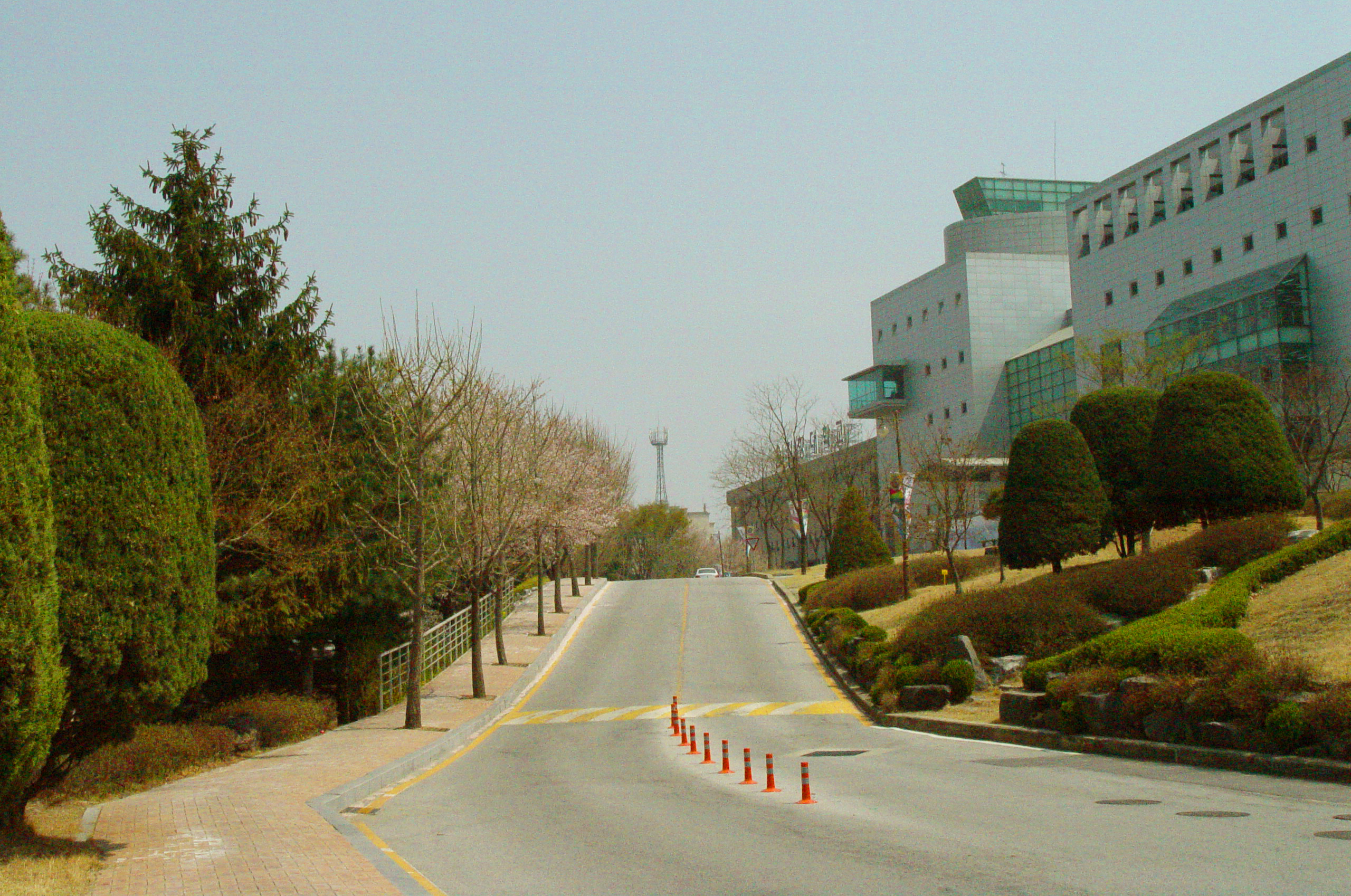
The road towards the library of Soonchunhyang University

- Graduate School of Industrial Information
- Graduate School of Education
- Graduate School of Healthcare Science
- Graduate School of Public Administration
- Graduate School of Global Management

=== Graduate School of Forensic Science ===
The School was established to educate students theoretical and application methods of scientific crime investigation. The graduate program focuses on the application of the physical, bio-medical, and social sciences to the analysis and evaluation of physical evidence, human testimony and criminal suspects. As of 2014 the Graduate School of Forensic Science established a Master's program in Digital Forensic Science.

== Departments ==
=== College of Medicine ===
- Department of Premedical Studies
- Department of Medicine
- Department of Nursing

=== College of medical sciences ===
- Department of Health Administration & Management
- Department of Medical Biotechnology
- Department of Biomedical Laboratory Science
- Department of Occupational Therapy
- Department of Pharmaceutical Engineering
- Department of Biomedical Engineering

=== College of Natural Sciences ===
- Department of Chemistry
- Department of Food Science & Nutrition
- Department of Environmental Health Science
- Department of Biology
- Department of Sports Science
- Department of Leisure and Recreation
- Department of Sports Medicine

=== College of Humanities and Social Sciences ===
- Department of Youth Education & Counseling
- Department of Law
- Department of Public Administration
- Department of Police Administration
- Department of Social Welfare

=== College of Global Business ===
- Department of Business Administration
- Department of International Trade
- Department of Tourism Management
- Department of Economics and Finance
- Department of IT Financial Management
- Department of Global Culture Industry
- Department of Accounting

=== College of Engineering ===
- Department of Computer Science & Engineering
- Department of Information & Communication Engineering
- Department of Electronic Engineering
- Department of Electrical Engineering
- Department of Electronics & Information Engineering
- Department of Chemical Engineering
- Department of Energy & Environmental Engineering
- Department of Display Materials Engineering
- Department of Mechanical Engineering

=== SCH MediaLabs ===
- Department of Korean Culture Contents
- Department of British & American Studies
- Department of Chinese Studies
- Department of Media & Communications
- Department of Architecture
- Department of Digital Animation
- Department of Smart Automobile
- Department of Energy Engineering
- Department of Performing and Visual Arts
- Department of Carbon Neutrality
- Department of Integrated Healthcare Science
- Department of Biopharmaceutical Science

=== College of Hyangseol Nanum ===
- Department of Global Open Major

== Ranking ==
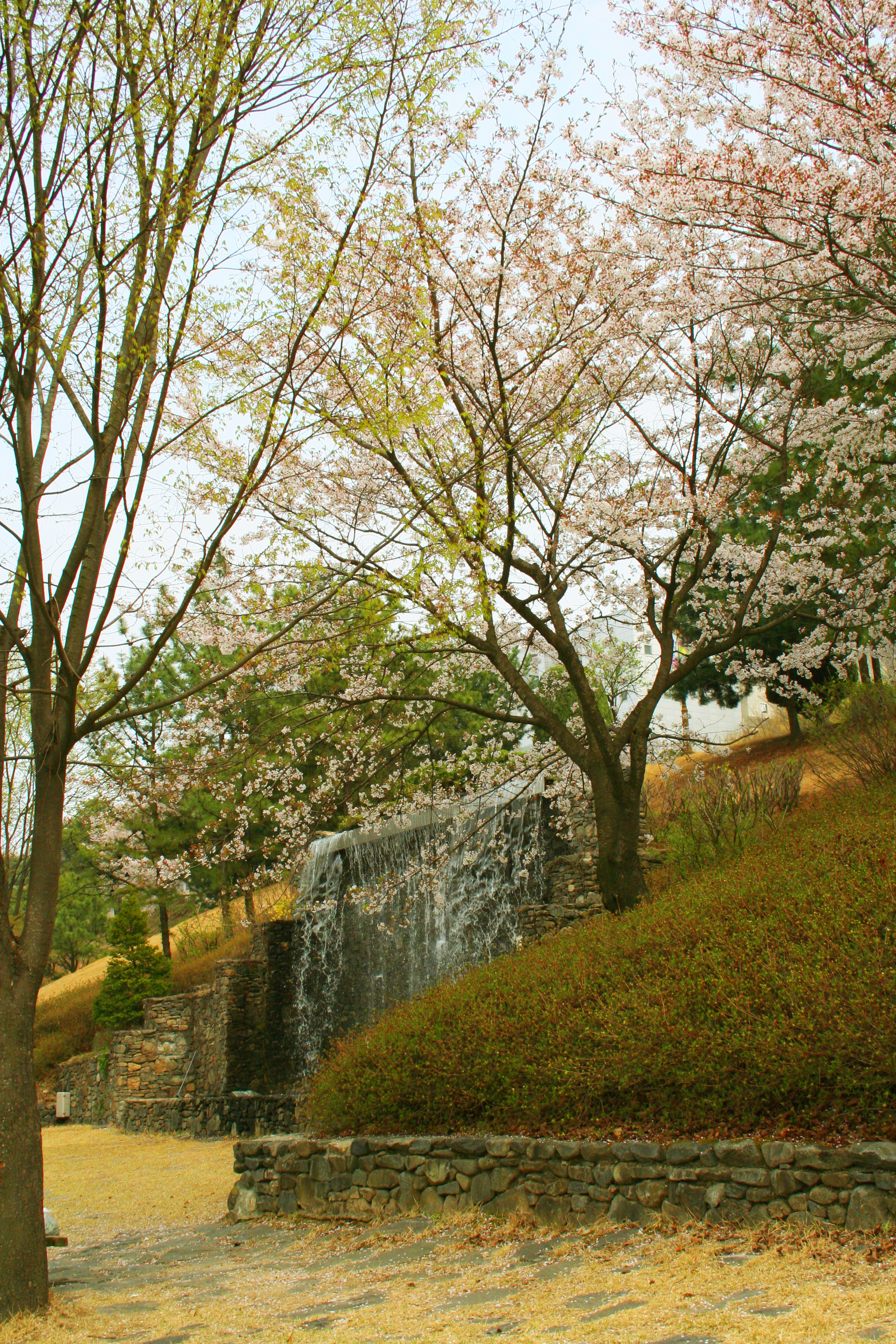
An artificial waterfall at Soonchunhyang University

- SCH ranked 151st for general education among Asia-Pacific universities by Chosun-QS Asia in 2010
- SCH ranked 8th for general education environment and for communication with students by Kyunhyang ERISS in 2010
- SCH ranked 135th for general education among Asia-Pacific universities by Chosun-QS Asia in 2009

== Transportation ==
SCH offered shuttle bus service from Seoul and various cities in Gyeonggi Province and Incheon. This was shut down after campus renovations and remodeling removed the campus bus station in early 2021.

SCH maintains a lending library for the local public within Sinchang-Soonchunhyang University Station. Books and periodicals range from academic texts to novels to general interest periodicals.

SCH undertook an educational initiative for its students commuting to campus by subway in Fall 2010, offering lectures in three university courses by SCH professors. The car of the train where the lectures are held is equipped with four LCD monitors, a beam projector, speakers, and a wireless microphone for the professors.

== University hospitals ==
SCU owns and operates four teaching hospitals in South Korea. These are general hospitals offering services in several departments such as Pediatric Neurology, Psychology, and Cardiovascular Surgery

Hospital Name	Date Opened	Number of Beds
Soonchunhyang University Hospital Seoul	1974	788
Soonchunhyang University Hospital Gumi	1979	369
Soonchunhyang University Hospital Cheonan	1982	963
Soonchunhyang University Hospital Bucheon	2001	957

== Global network ==
Soonchunhyang University maintains formal educational partnerships with 194 post-secondary institutions worldwide. These partner institutions are found in the US, China, Finland, Australia, Japan, Mexico, Cambodia, Thailand and several other countries.

== Global village ==
The Global Village is the best dormitory on the Soonchunhyang campus as well as one of the best dormitories in Korea. This modern facility was built in 2006 for the sole purpose of fitting the needs of the international and Korean students residing together. The dormitory is configured in "suite style" living arrangements which allows 12 students to live in 1 suite. Each suite has 2 bathrooms, 2 showers, 2 sinks and six sleeping rooms that are connected by a common living room furnished with a suit case cabinet and drying rack.

Facilities : Kitchens, Dining area, Study lounges, Washing machine.

== Confucius Institute ==
The Confucius Institute at SCU was established on September 28, 2007, in affiliation with the Tianjin Foreign Studies University in China, with a mandate to promote Chinese language education and cultural learning. Programs include Chinese language education classes, Chinese youth camp, and cultural field trips to China.

As of June 15, 2010, the Confucius Institute at SCH and the local government of Asan City began to offer programs for Asan's youth through the Asan City Youth Education and Culture Center (link to reference).

In 2008 and 2009, The Confucius Institute was rated first in Korea and third in the world for overall achievement by Confucius Institute headquarters.

== University clubs ==
- Hansori performs 'samulnori', About 50 members practice every week for playing regular and temporary performance.
- Since 1981, the Byuk theater group performs two regular plays a year, and casual play sometimes.
- Since 1985, the Korean Traditional Percussion Group has explored Korean musical traditions. Currently, there are 50 members to this club, including 34 undergraduate students.
- The Thu.G club meets regularly to practice rapping and beat box skills. The club holds four main performances throughout the school year.
- The Sun C.A Cheerleading Squad meets weekly to practice dances and movement for cheerleading. With 38 members (30 of whom are undergraduates
- DENIS (Dance Energy Nation In Soonchunhyang) practices street dance
- CHORD is one of Soonchunhyang's longest-standing clubs. Established in 1986, this club currently maintains 200 members (including 50 undergraduate students), who regularly perform at events such as the annual regular and open concerts, mini concerts for new students, SCH Music Festival, and periodic field trips. This club won first place in the KBS TV Academic Music Festival in 1988, and took second place in the same festival in 1991. In 2006, CHORD won first place in the Korean Amateur Music Festival.
- M. Giuliani, or Classical Guitar Circle, currently has 99 members, 40 of whom are undergraduate students. This club offers guitar lessons to its members and participates in mini concerts and regular concerts annually.
- Soongumhoi is the campus fencing club, with 150 members (30 of whom are undergraduate students). T
- The Tae Kwon Do club was established in 1992 with 20 members, and has expanded to 60 members (including 37 undergraduate students).
- The Calligraphy Group was founded in 1978. Currently, 38 members (30 of whom are undergraduate students). During regular meetings, members practice Korean-style calligraphy (called soye) .

== Notable alumni ==
- Jeon No-min, actor
