= Hamchoon Women's Clinic =

Geography
- Location: South Korea
- Coordinates: 37.486615°N 127.015964°E

Organisation
- Type: Women's clinic

History
- Opened: 1992

Links
- Lists: Hospitals in South Korea
Hamchoon Women's Clinic
- Type: General Partnership
- Industry: Health Care
- Founded: 1992
- Headquarters: Seoul, South Korea
- Key people: Kichul Kim, Co-founder and CEO; Doyoung Hwang, Partner and CTO
- Products: Infertility; Genetic testing OB/GYN care
- Number of employees: 95 (2013)
- Website: hamchoon.com

Hamchoon Women's Clinic (Korean: 함춘여성산부인과) is a specialized clinic for infertility, genetic testing, and general Medical and health organizations in South Korea care. It also started to provide a childbirth service in 2008 by opening a branch in Apgujeong-dong. Hamchoon is especially renowned for genetic testing for disorders such as Down syndrome. The clinic also has a separate laboratory dedicated to infertility and genetics and a subsidiary for developing healthcare technology.

The current chairman of Hamchoon Women's Clinic is Dr. Kichul Kim.

== History ==
Hamchoon Women's Clinic was founded in 1992 as a partnership hospital. The initial partners were Kichul Kim, Sohyun Park, and Eungi Min. In 1993, Doyoung Hwang joined the team. Hamchoon soon started to practice "Triple Marker", which was a genetic test for fetus. In 1997, Hamchoon established a laboratory dedicated to infertility, genetics, and medical technology. After a year from the establishment, the Hamchoon Laboratory announced the development of "HIT", a prenatal diagnosis package. Hamchoon Women's Clinic and its laboratory moved to a new building in Seocho, Seoul. In 2005, the clinic was recognized from Ministry of Health and Welfare as a legal embryo research institution.

== Organization ==
As of 2008, the partnership consists of Kichul Kim and Doyoung Hwang. Two of the initial partners, Sohyun Park and Eungi Min, left the partnership.

Hamchoon Women's Clinic currently have 10 doctors specialized in OB/GYN and infertility. In addition, the clinic has specialists for anesthetic and radiology.
