= Soonchunhyang University Hospital =

Hospital network in South Korea

Soonchunhyang University Cheonan Hospital

Geography
- Location: Cheonan, South Korea
- Coordinates: 36.8042059°N 127.1358811°E -->

Organisation
- Type: General

Services
- Beds: 963

History
- Opened: 1982

Links
- Lists: Hospitals in South Korea

Korean name
- Hangul: 순천향대학교 부속 천안병원
- Hanja: 順天鄕大學校附屬天安病院
- RR: Suncheonhyang daehakgyo busok Cheonan byeongwon
- MR: Sunch'ŏnhyang taehakkyo pusok Ch'ŏnan pyŏngwŏn

Soonchunhyang University Hospital is a system of four hospitals in South Korea. It has facilities in Seoul, Bucheon, Cheonan, and Gumi. The medical center currently operates over 3,000 beds in total. All four hospitals are affiliated with Soonchunhyang University and serve as educational institutions for students of Soonchunhyang University College of Medicine.

Soonchunhyang means "a hometown where the will of heaven unfolds through human love" in Korean.

In 2020, Soonchunhyang University Bucheon Hospital and Soonchunhyang University Cheonan Hospital ranked 1st and 2nd in the "Patient Experience Evaluation" conducted by the Health Insurance Review and Assessment Service in South Korea.

== Facilities ==
| Hospital Name | Date Opened | Number of Beds |
|---|---|---|
| Soonchunhyang Hospital Seoul | 1974 | 788 |
| Soonchunhyang Hospital Gumi | 1979 | 369 |
| Soonchunhyang Hospital Cheonan | 1982 | 963 |
| Soonchunhyang Hospital Bucheon | 2001 | 957 |

=== Soonchunhyang University Seoul Hospital ===
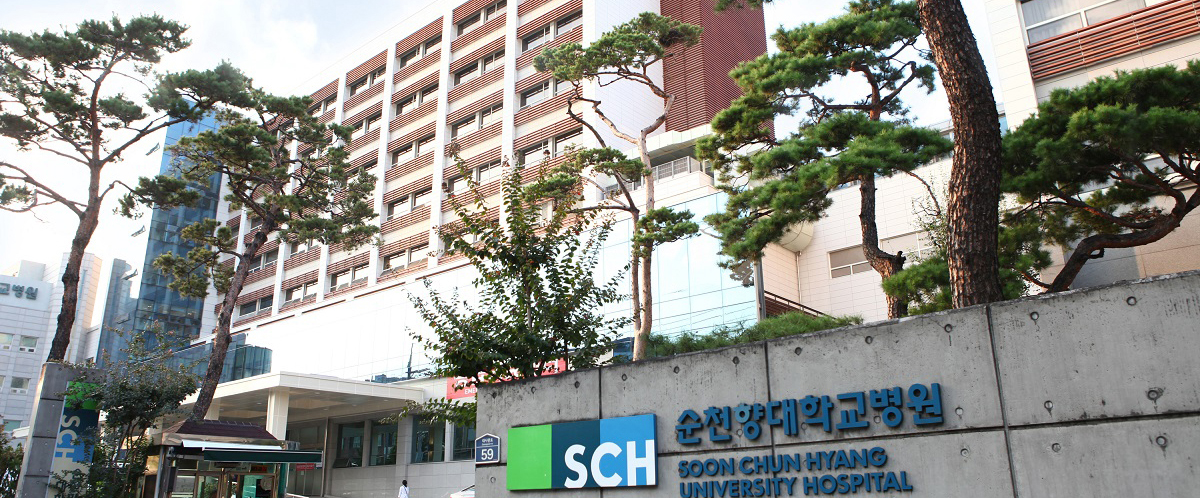

Soonchunhyang University Seoul Hospital was founded in 1974 by Secc-Jo Suh, the neurologist who served as the personal physician for President Park Chung-hee and First Lady Yuk Young-soo at that time. Currently the hospital functions as a general hospital with 788 beds in operation.

In 2014, Lee Kun-hee, the chairman of the Samsung Group was successfully transported to the emergency room of Soonchunhyang University Seoul Hospital after experiencing acute myocardial infarction, and saved his life.

=== Soonchunhyang University Cheonan Hospital ===
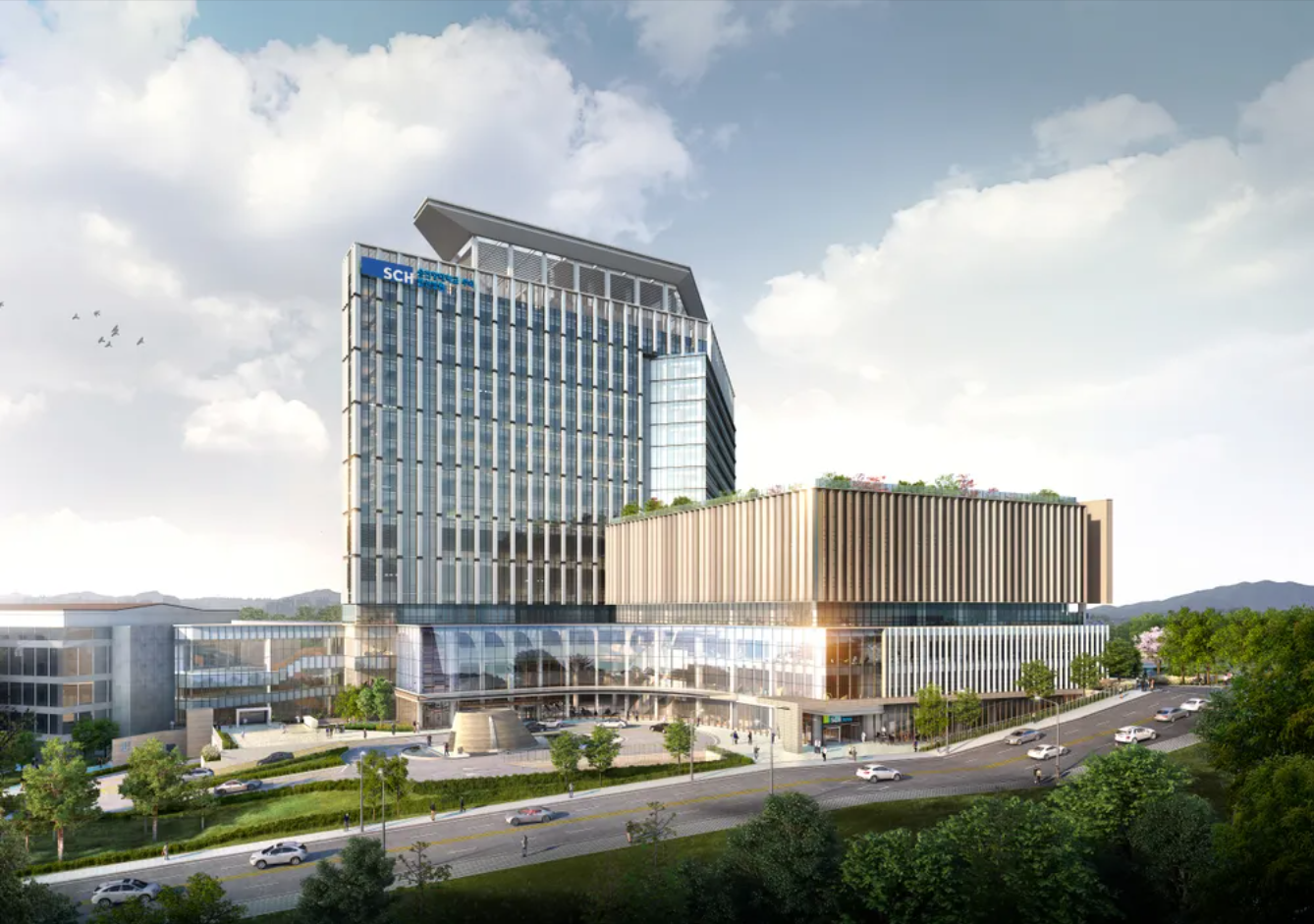

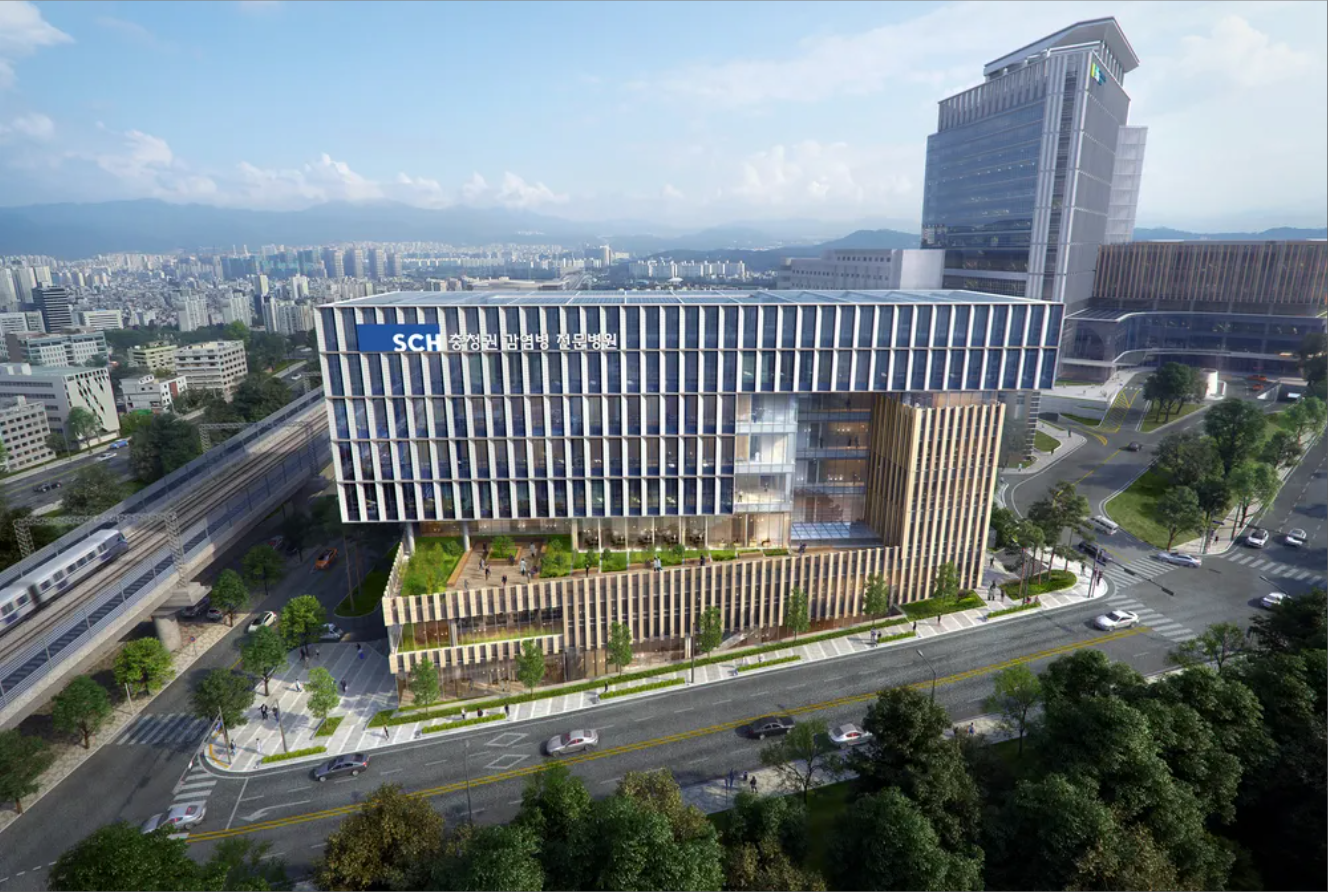

Soonchunhyang University Cheonan Hospital is the senior general hospital located in Cheonan, established in 1982. It is the first modern comprehensive hospital in Chungcheong-do. This hospital possesses the world's only Pesticide Poisoning Research Institute and is constantly researching methods for treating pesticide and cadmium poisoning.

The hospital is the main education site for medical students of Soonchunhyang University. Medical students in their first and second years (MS1 and MS2) attend classes in this campus. The campus and hospital also serves as the main site for medical research, including the Soonchunhyang Institute of Medi-Bio Science (SIMS).

Currently, Soonchunhyang University Cheonan Hospital is constructing a new hospital and a specialized infectious disease hospital. Both are scheduled for completion in 2024 and 2025, respectively.

=== Soonchunhyang University Bucheon Hospital ===
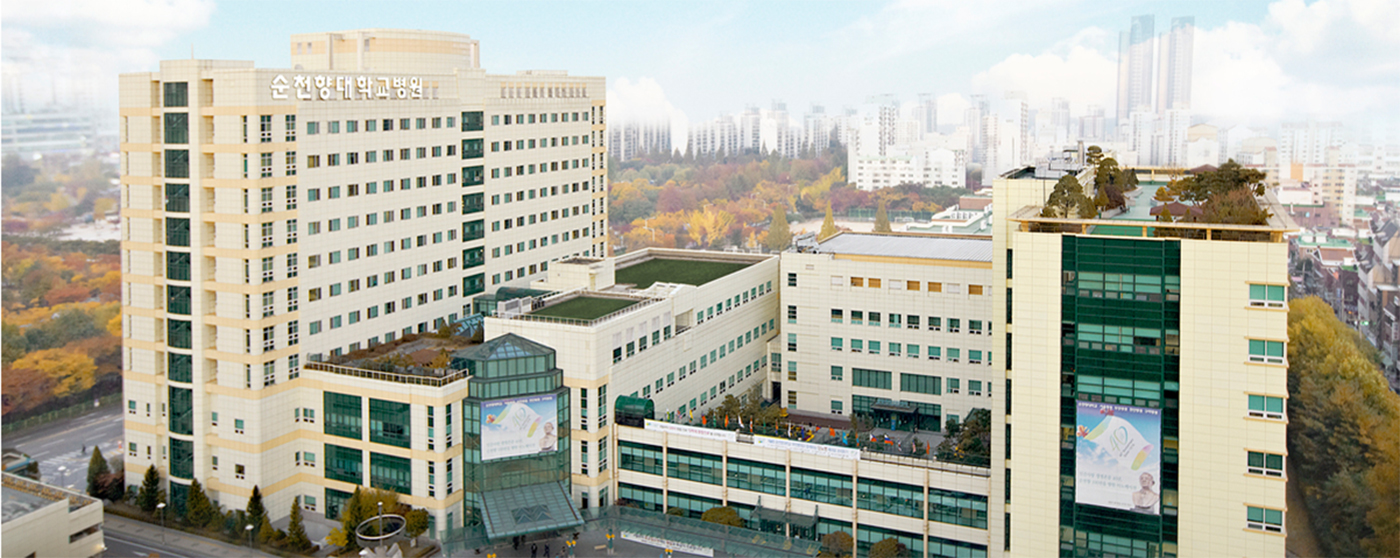

Soonchunhyang University Bucheon Hospital was first opened in 2001. It serves as the senior general hospital, operating 957 beds in total. Bucheon Hospital is utilized as a core clerkship training site for Soonchunhyang University College of Medicine MS3 students.

=== Soonchunhyang University Gumi Hospital ===
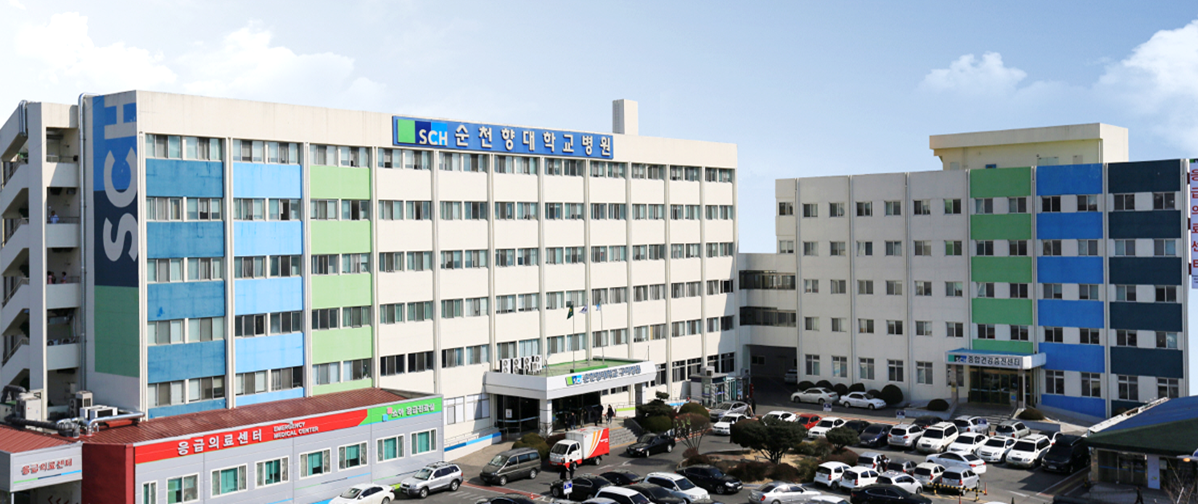

Soonchunhyang University Gumi Hospital was established in 1979 in Gumi Industrial Complex, which is a hub for advanced electronic industries in Korea. They have specialized in occupational medicine and established the Group Industrial Health Research Institute and other related facilities, carrying out specialized medical treatment and research as a specialized hospital in occupational medicine.
