= Milad Haghani =

Australian crowd-safety and transport researcher

- Education: University of Melbourne (PhD), Sharif University of Technology (MSc), Iran University of Science and Technology (BSc)
- Known for: Swiss Cheese Model of Crowd Safety; Crowd Safety Summit
- Awards: Australian Research Council Discovery Early Career Researcher Award (DECRA)
- Scientific career
- Fields: Crowd dynamics, pedestrian and evacuation dynamics, transport engineering, human factors
- Workplaces: University of Melbourne, University of New South Wales, University of Sydney
- Thesis: Humans' decision-making during emergency evacuations of crowded environments: behavioural analyses and econometric modelling perspectives (2019)

Milad Haghani is an Australian researcher of crowd safety and urban mobility. He is an associate professor of Urban Mobility at the University of Melbourne. He also serves as a principal fellow in Resilience & Mobility at Melbourne's Department of Infrastructure Engineering. His work focuses on pedestrian and evacuation dynamics, behavioural modelling and transport safety. He is known for introducing the "Swiss Cheese Model of Crowd Safety" and for founding the Crowd Safety Summit. He is a science commentator and author for many media platforms.

== Education ==
Haghani completed a BSc in civil engineering at the Iran University of Science and Technology and an MSc in transport engineering at Sharif University of Technology. He earned a PhD in Transport Engineering at the University of Melbourne. His thesis, completed in 2019 at Melbourne's Centre for Spatial Data Infrastructures and Land Administratio, examined decision-making during emergency evacuations in crowded environments.

== Career ==
Before joining the University of Melbourne, Haghani was a senior lecturer and Australian Research Council DECRA fellow at the University of New South Wales School of Civil and Environmental Engineering, where his research spanned crowd dynamics, emergency planning and transport safety.

He earlier held a fellowship at the Institute of Transport and Logistics Studies in the University of Sydney Business School. At Melbourne, he is listed among the academic staff as principal fellow (Resilience & Mobility) and works on urban mobility and geospatial aspects of transport planning. In 2021, he was awarded an ARC DECRA for a programme on behavioural interventions in crowd evacuation planning (2021–2024).

== Research ==
Haghani's research examines how people move and make decisions in crowds and during evacuations, and how small behavioural changes can improve safety and efficiency. His review articles on empirical methods in pedestrian, crowd and evacuation dynamics mapped experimental and field approaches and identified controversies in the literature. He has also published on conceptual debates in crowd dynamics, including the use of the terms "panic", "irrationality" and "herding".

Beyond crowds, he has contributed to behavioural and choice-modelling research, including a widely cited review on hypothetical bias in stated choice experiments. In 2023, Haghani founded the Crowd Safety Summit, an academic–industry initiative aimed at reducing preventable deaths and injuries in crowded places. The 2025 edition was held in Seoul, South Korea, and listed him as chair and founder.

== Selected works ==
- Haghani, M. (2020). "Empirical methods in pedestrian, crowd and evacuation dynamics: Part I. Experimental methods and emerging topics." Safety Science 129: 104743. doi:10.1016/j.ssci.2020.104743.
- Haghani, M. (2020). "Empirical methods in pedestrian, crowd and evacuation dynamics: Part II. Field methods and controversial topics." Safety Science 129: 104760. doi:10.1016/j.ssci.2020.104760.
- Haghani, M., & Lovreglio, R. (2022). Data-based tools can prevent crowd crushes. Science, 378(6624), 1060-1061.
- Haghani, M. et al. (2023). "A roadmap for the future of crowd safety research and practice: Introducing the Swiss Cheese Model of Crowd Safety and the imperative of a Vision Zero target." Safety Science 168: 106292. doi:10.1016/j.ssci.2023.106292.

== Awards ==
Haghani received an ARC Discovery Early Career Researcher Award for 2021–2024 for the project "A novel approach in crowd evacuation planning: Behavioural intervention."
