= Chung-Ang University Hospital =

Geography
- Location: 102 Heukseok-ro, Dongjak-gu, Seoul, South Korea
- Coordinates: 37.5069°N 126.9604°E

Organisation
- Type: Teaching
- Affiliated university: Chung-Ang University College of Medicine
- Network: Chung-Ang University Healthcare System

Services
- Emergency department: Local emergency medical center
- Beds: 756

History
- Former name: Korea Medical Service Institute-affiliated Sungshim Hospital (1968–1971)
- Opened: June 10, 1968

Links
- Website: ch.cauhs.or.kr/eng/
- Lists: Hospitals in South Korea

Chung-Ang University Hospital (CAUH; Korean: 중앙대학교병원) is an academic medical center located in Heukseok-dong, Dongjak-gu, Seoul, South Korea. Serving as the primary teaching hospital for the Chung-Ang University College of Medicine, it provides comprehensive tertiary care and functions as a central research facility within the Chung-Ang University Healthcare System (CAUHS).

The medical center is currently designated as a Tertiary General Hospital (Korean: 상급종합병원) by the Ministry of Health and Welfare, a status certified for institutions capable of treating severe and complex diseases. As of 2015, the hospital operated 845 beds and employed approximately 2,000 staff members. It is noted for high research productivity; a 2022 report indicated that its faculty ranked fourth nationwide in Science Citation Index (SCI) publication performance per full-time member.

== History ==
The institution was originally established on June 10, 1968, in Pil-dong, Jung-gu, Seoul, under the name Sungshim Hospital. Founded by professors from the Catholic University of Korea College of Medicine, the facility was acquired by Chung-Ang University on December 28, 1971. The medical center expanded its operations on May 11, 1984, by leasing the former Yongsan Railway Hospital from the Korea Railroad Corporation (KORAIL). Originally opened in 1907 as Yongsan Dongin Hospital, this branch served as a key facility until 2011, when its functions were integrated into the headquarters following the expiration of the lease.

On December 18, 2004, the hospital relocated to its current campus in Heukseok-dong, adjacent to the university, to foster integrated medical education. The facility underwent significant physical expansion on March 31, 2011, with the completion of Dajeong Hall, a 10-story annex that added 320 beds to the existing capacity. Following these developments and the establishment of an International Medical Team in 2012, the hospital has maintained its accreditation as a Tertiary General Hospital continuously from the first evaluation cycle (2012–2014) through the fifth cycle (2024–2026).

== See also ==
- Chung-Ang University
- List of hospitals in South Korea
