= List of hospitals in South Korea =

In South Korea, there are about 3,200 general hospitals nationwide. This list illustrates the 45 tertiary general hospitals (Korean: 상급종합병원), which are general hospitals capable of providing high-level medical services, accredited by the ministry of health and welfare of the Republic of Korea.

== List of Tertiary general hospitals ==
All senior general hospitals serve as teaching hospitals. Names in italic represent institutions with direct affiliation with a college/school of medicine.

=== Seoul Metropolitan City ===
- Asan Medical Center
- Chung-Ang University Hospital
- Ewha Womans University Mokdong Hospital
- Hanyang University Seoul Hospital
- Kangbuk Samsung Hospital
- Konkuk University Medical Center
- Korea University Anam Hospital
- Kyunghee University Medical Center
- Samsung Medical Center
- Seoul National University Hospital - SNUH
- Severance Hospital
- The Catholic University of Korea Seoul St. Mary's Hospital
- Yonsei University Gangnam Severance Hospital

=== Busan Metropolitan City ===
- Dong-a University Hospital
- Inje University Busan Paik Hospital
- Kosin University Gospel Hospital
- Pusan National University Hospital - PNUH

=== Incheon Metropolitan City ===
- Gachon University Gil Medical Center
- Inha University Hospital
- The Catholic University of Korea Incheon St. Mary's Hospital

=== Daegu Metropolitan City ===
- Daegu Catholic University Medical Center
- Keimyung University Dongsan Hospital
- Kyungpook National University Chilgok Hospital
- Kyungpook National University Hospital
- Yeungnam University Hospital

=== Gwangju Metropolitan City ===
- Chonnam National University Hospital
- Chosun University Hospital

=== Daejeon Metropolitan City ===
- Chungnam National University Hospital (CNUH)
- Konyang University Hospital

=== Ulsan Metropolitan City ===
- Ulsan University Hospital

=== Gyeonggi Province ===
- Ajou University Hospital
- Hallym University Sacred Heart Hospital
- Seoul National University Bundang Hospital - SNUBH
- Soonchunhyang University Bucheon Hospital
- Korea University Ansan Hospital
- The Catholic University of Korea St. Vincent's Hospital

=== Gangwon Province ===
- Gangneung Asan Hospital
- Yonsei University Wonju Severance Christian Hospital

=== Chungcheongbuk Province ===
- Chungbuk National University Hospital

=== Chungcheongnam Province ===
- Dankook University Hospital
- Soonchunhyang University Cheonan Hospital

=== Gyeongsangnam Province ===
- Gyeongsang National University Hospital - GNUH
- Pusan National University Yangsan Hospital - PNUYH
- Samsung Changwon Hospital

=== Jeollabuk Province ===
- Jeonbuk National University Hospital
- Wonkwang University Hospital

=== Jeollanam Province ===
- Chonnam National University Hwasun Hospital
