= COVID-19 pandemic in South Korea =

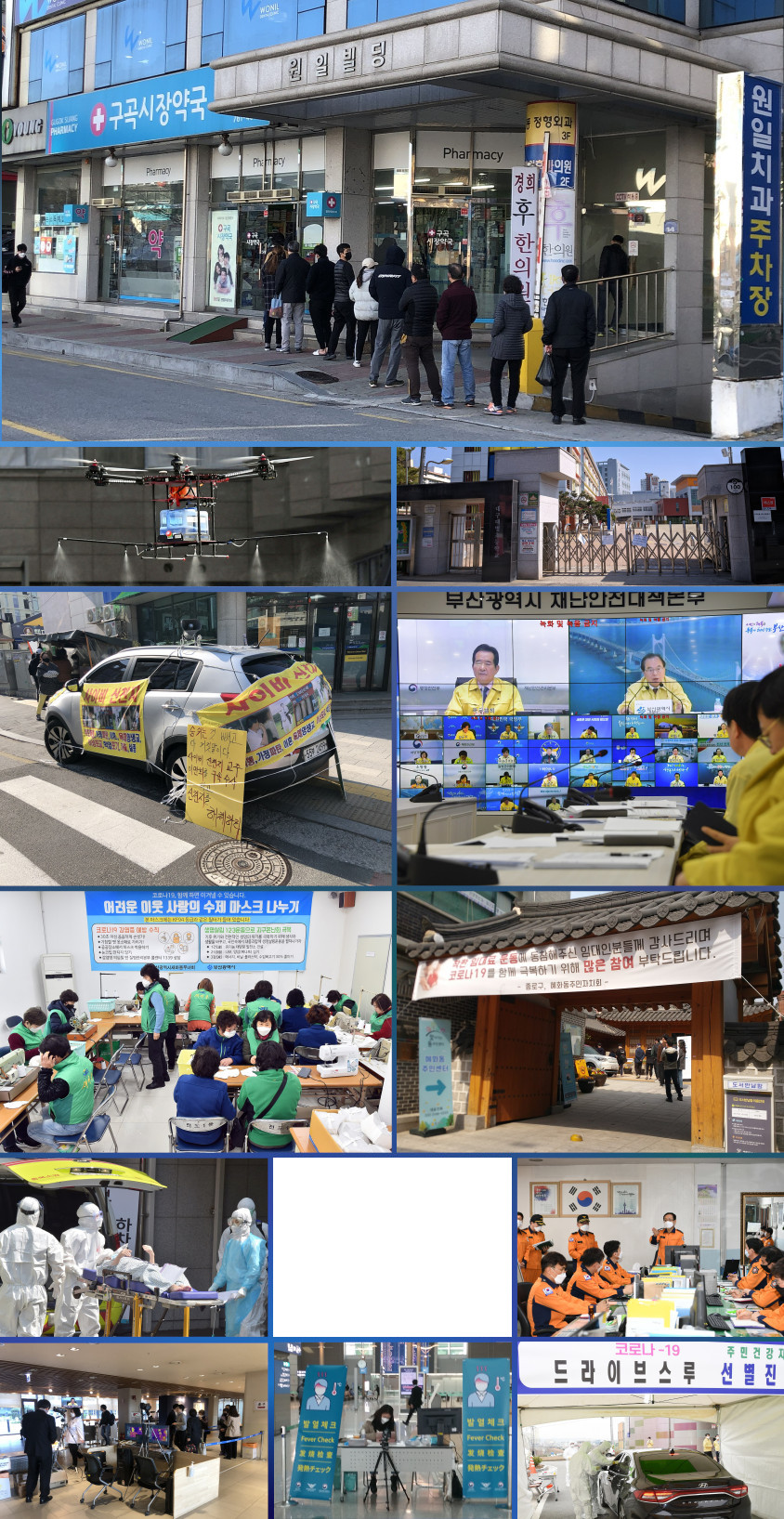
- From top to bottom then from left to right: a queue in front of a pharmacy in Wonju for the distribution of masks, a drone of disinfection in Seongnam, a closed elementary school in Daegu, protest inscriptions against Shincheonji on a car, video call between members of the South Korean government, manufacturing of masks in Busan, 2020 South Korean legislative election, admission of a symptomatic patient to a hospital in Busan, portable medical negative pressure isolation stretcher in a fire station in Hoengseong County, firefighters' training in Daegu, thermal camera at the entrance to Wonju hospital, temperature check at Incheon International Airport, drive-through testing in Gyeongju.

- Map of special cities and municipalities with confirmed or suspected coronavirus cases (as of 5 March 2022): Confirmed 1~9,999 Confirmed 10,000~99,999 Confirmed ≥100,000

- Coronavirus pandemic in South Korea over time (since 20 January 2020). Number of cases (logarithmically) Day not included in map Day included in map Last day included in map
- Disease: COVID-19
- Pathogen: SARS-CoV-2
- Location: South Korea
- First outbreak: Wuhan, Hubei, China
- Index case: Incheon International Airport
- Arrival date: 20 January 2020 (6 years, 8 months, 1 week and 1 day)
- Confirmed cases: 34,571,873
- Severe cases: 1,073
- Deaths: 35,934
- Fatality rate: 0.1%
- Vaccinations: 44,764,956 (total vaccinated); 44,347,430 (fully vaccinated); 129,647,784 (doses administered)

Government website
- ncov.mohw.go.kr/en

The first case of COVID-19 in South Korea was announced on 20 January 2020. The number of confirmed cases increased on 19 February by 20, and on 20 February by 58 or 70, giving a total of 346 confirmed cases on 21 February 2020, according to the Korea Disease Control and Prevention Agency (KDCA), with the sudden jump mostly attributed to "Patient 31" who participated in a gathering at a Shincheonji Church of Jesus the Temple of the Tabernacle of the Testimony church in Daegu.

Amidst fears of further contamination, mass gatherings in the affected cities were cancelled and about 300 soldiers in Daegu were placed in isolation. On 4 February 2020, in order to help prevent spread of the disease, South Korea began denying entry to foreigners traveling from Hubei Province in China.

South Korea introduced what was considered one of the largest and best-organised epidemic control programs in the world, along with Singapore, Taiwan, and Vietnam. Various measures were taken to mass test the population for the virus, and isolate any infected people as well as trace and quarantine those they had contact with, without any further lockdown. The rapid and extensive testing undertaken by South Korea was initially successful in limiting the spread of the outbreak, without using the drastic measure of locking down entire cities. A significant rise in the number of new infections began in August 2020, with clusters being linked to Protestant churches in the Seoul Metropolitan Area. Another rise began in the third week of November, and Seoul entered a third wave of infections. On 24 November, the government raised the social distancing level in Seoul to level 2. On 29 November, the social distancing level in other areas of the country was raised to 1.5. In December, it was raised to level 2.5 in some metropolitan areas and 2 in other areas.

In early 2022, there was a major spike in cases related to the Omicron variant, with 170 thousand cases reported on February 22. South Korea began relaxing social distancing rules on 4 March 2022, and announced a shift toward endemic living on 18 March. It lifted its vaccine mandate and quarantine requirement for fully vaccinated travelers on 1 April. The number of new daily reported cases peaked at 621,317 on 16 March 2022, and the number of daily deaths peaked at 432 on 29 March 2022.

== Timeline ==
Epidemic curve of COVID-19 in South Korea

Map of special cities & municipals with confirmed or suspected coronavirus cases (as of 18 August 2020):
Confirmed cases reported
Suspected cases reported
14 days no confirmed cases

Confirmed cases per million residents by province or city

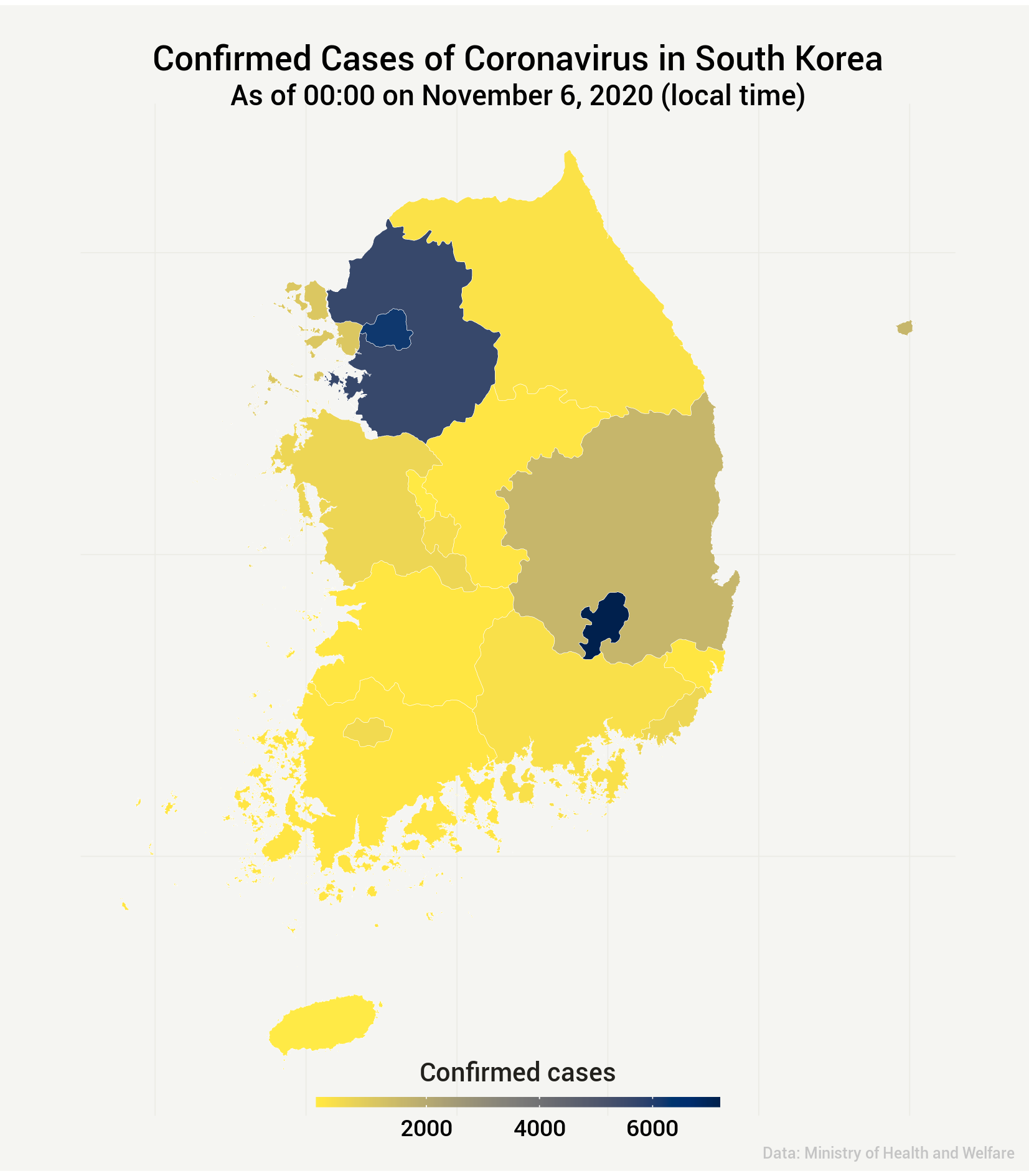
Number of confirmed cases by province or special city

During the first four weeks, South Korea controlled the potential spread of COVID-19 by using high-tech resources like tracking the use of credit cards and checking CCTV footage of confirmed patients. After 18 February, the number of cases increased to more than 1,700 after discovering that patient number 31 was a member of the Shincheonji Church of Jesus. Some media reported that it was difficult for KCDC to screen the patient because Shincheonji teaches that illness is sin, and that members were uncooperative with KCDC and were out of reach. Shincheonji denied this, and other sources report that the sect did cooperate with the authorities. About half of confirmed cases were linked to the Shincheonji Church as of 27 February; this was verified by health officials. As of 10 March, the KCDC was able to contact and test most of the Shincheonji Church members, with the total number of tests nationally standing at around 200,000.

=== 20 January – 17 February 2020 ===
On 20 January, a 35-year-old Chinese woman was confirmed as the first case. The first South Korean national to be infected occurred three days later, a 55-year-old man who worked in Wuhan, China, and returned for a checkup with flu symptoms. The two infection reports were publicly released on 24 January.

On 26 January, a 54-year-old South Korean man was the third case. He had used a rental car and visited three restaurants, a hotel, a convenience store and met his family before admitting himself to hospital. All these places were disinfected. On 27 January, a fourth case was reported as a 55-year-old South Korean man who returned from Wuhan on 20 January. He first experienced flu symptoms on 21 January and developed further complications four days later, eventually turning himself in. Both cases were tallied into formal records on 27 January.

On 1 February, an update on the first four patients was received. It indicated that the first three were showing weaker symptoms and recovering well while the fourth was being treated for pneumonia. Rumours circulated that the fourth patient had died, while the health authorities denied the rumours.

Two more confirmed cases were reported on 30 January. The fifth patient was a 32-year-old South Korean man who returned from his work at Wuhan on 24 January. The sixth patient was the first case in South Korea who had never visited Wuhan. The 56-year-old man caught the virus when visiting a restaurant with the third patient.

On 31 January, a seventh patient was reported as a 28-year-old South Korean man returning from Wuhan on 23 January. He developed symptoms on 26 January 2020 and was admitted to hospital on 28 January. On the same day, four more patients were admitted into the record. The eighth patient, a 62-year-old South Korean woman, returned from Wuhan. The ninth patient caught the virus from the fifth patient through direct contact. The tenth and the eleventh patients were the wife and child of the sixth patient, who became infected while visiting him.

On 1 February, a 49-year-old Chinese national working in Japan as a tour guide was confirmed as the twelfth patient. He caught the virus while visiting a Japanese patient in Japan and entered South Korea through Gimpo International Airport on 19 January. The KCDC confirmed an additional three cases on 2 February, bringing the total to fifteen.

A woman who had returned from a five-day vacation in Thailand tested positive and was confirmed as the sixteenth case on 4 February. Three more cases were confirmed on 5 February, taking the total to 19. The seventeenth and nineteenth patients had attended a conference in Singapore and been in contact with an infected individual there. The same day the KCDC announced that the second patient had been released from hospital after testing negative in consecutive tests, becoming the country's first coronavirus patient to fully recover.

On 15 February, a workshop for fitness dance instructors was held in Cheonan. By 9 March, dance classes at 12 sport facilities were associated with 112 cases of COVID-19. 30 of the cases were asymptomatic at the time of laboratory confirmation. 50.9 percent of cases were from instructors to fitness class participants, 33.9 percent were transmissions to family members by instructors or class participants, and 15.2 percent were during meetings with acquaintances or coworkers.

Details of the first 30 confirmed cases in South Korea (as of 17 February 2020)
| Case | Date | Age | Gender | Nationality | Place of stay | Hospital of admission | Visited Wuhan? | Entry date | Status | Contacts of the case | Note | Source |
|---|---|---|---|---|---|---|---|---|---|---|---|---|
| 1 | 20 January 2020 | 35 | Female | Chinese | Incheon | Incheon Metropolitan City Medical Center, Incheon | Yes | 19 January 2020 | Discharged (6 February 2020) | 45 | | |
| 2 | 24 January 2020 | 55 | Male | Korean | Seoul | National Medical Center, Seoul | Yes | 22 January 2020 | Discharged (5 February 2020) | 75 | | |
| 3 | 26 January 2020 | 54 | Male | Korean | Goyang | Myongji Hospital, Goyang | Yes | 20 January 2020 | Discharged (12 February 2020) | 16 | | |
| 4 | 27 January 2020 | 55 | Male | Korean | Pyeongtaek | Seoul National University Bundang Hospital, Seongnam | Yes | 20 January 2020 | Discharged (9 February 2020) | 95 | | |
| 5 | 30 January 2020 | 33 | Male | Korean | Seoul | Seoul Metropolitan City Seoul Medical Center, Seoul | Yes | 24 January 2020 | Discharged (March 2020) | 31 | | |
| 6 | 30 January 2020 | 55 | Male | Korean | Seoul | Seoul National University Hospital, Seoul | No | (Infection in Domestic) | Discharged (19 February 2020) | 17 | Friend of case 3 | |
| 7 | 30 January 2020 | 28 | Male | Korean | Seoul | Seoul Metropolitan City Seoul Medical Center, Seoul | Yes | 23 January 2020 | Discharged (15 February 2020) | 9 | | |
| 8 | 31 January 2020 | 62 | Female | Korean | Gunsan | Wonkwang University Hospital, Iksan | Yes | 23 January 2020 | Discharged (12 February 2020) | 113 | | |
| 9 | 31 January 2020 | 28 | Female | Korean | Seoul | Seoul Metropolitan City Seoul Medical Center, Seoul | No | (Infection in Domestic) | Discharged (24 February 2020) | 2 | Friend of case 5 | |
| 10 | 31 January 2020 | 54 | Female | Korean | Seoul | Seoul National University Hospital, Seoul | No | (Infection in Domestic) | Discharged (19 February 2020) | 43 | Wife of case 6 | |
| 11 | 31 January 2020 | 25 | Male | Korean | Seoul | Seoul National University Hospital, Seoul | No | (Infection in Domestic) | Discharged (10 February 2020) | 43 | Son of case 6 | |
| 12 | 1 February 2020 | 48 | Male | Chinese | Bucheon | Seoul National University Bundang Hospital, Seongnam | No | 19 January 2020 (Japan) | Discharged (18 February 2020) | 422 | Related to Japanese confirmed case | |
| 13 | 2 February 2020 | 28 | Male | Korean | Asan | National Medical Center, Seoul | Yes | 31 January 2020 | Discharged (24 February 2020) | 0 | Passenger on the evacuation flights from Wuhan | |
| 14 | 2 February 2020 | 40 | Female | Chinese | Bucheon | Seoul National University Bundang Hospital, Seongnam | No | (Infection in Domestic) | Discharged (18 February 2020) | 3 | Wife of case 12 | |
| 15 | 2 February 2020 | 43 | Male | Korean | Suwon | Korean Armed Forces Capital Hospital, Seongnam | Yes | 20 January 2020 | Discharged (24 February 2020) | 15 | | |
| 16 | 4 February 2020 | 42 | Female | Korean | Gwangju | Chonnam National University Hospital, Gwangju | No | 19 January 2020 (Thailand) | Discharged (19 February 2020) | 450 | | |
| 17 | 5 February 2020 | 37 | Male | Korean | Guri | Myongji Hospital, Goyang | No | 24 January 2020 (Singapore) | Discharged (12 February 2020) | 290 | Related to cases at Grand Hyatt Singapore | |
| 18 | 5 February 2020 | 20 | Female | Korean | Gwangju | Chonnam National University Hospital, Gwangju | No | 19 January 2020 (Thailand) | Discharged (19 February 2020) | 8 | Daughter of case 16 | |
| 19 | 5 February 2020 | 36 | Male | Korean | Seoul | Seoul Metropolitan City Seoul Medical Center, Seoul | No | 23 January 2020 (Singapore) | Discharged (21 February 2020) | 68 | Related to cases at Grand Hyatt Singapore | |
| 20 | 5 February 2020 | 41 | Female | Korean | Suwon | Korean Armed Forces Capital Hospital, Seongnam | No | (Infection in Domestic) | Discharged (24 February 2020) | 2 | Sister-in-law of case 15 | |
| 21 | 5 February 2020 | 59 | Female | Korean | Seoul | Seoul National University Hospital, Seoul | No | (Infection in Domestic) | Discharged (29 February 2020) | 6 | Friend of case 6 | |
| 22 | 6 February 2020 | 46 | Male | Korean | Naju | Chosun University Hospital, Gwangju | No | (Infection in Domestic) | Discharged (15 February 2020) | 1 | Brother of case 16 | |
| 23 | 6 February 2020 | 57 | Female | Chinese | Seoul | National Medical Center, Seoul | Yes | 23 January 2020 | Discharged (29 February 2020) | 23 | | |
| 24 | 6 February 2020 | 28 | Male | Korean | Asan | National Medical Center, Seoul | Yes | 31 January 2020 | Discharged (27 February 2020) | 0 | Passenger on the evacuation flights from Wuhan | |
| 25 | 9 February 2020 | 73 | Female | Korean | Siheung | Seoul National University Bundang Hospital, Seongnam | No | (Infection in Domestic) | Discharged (5 March 2020) | 12 | Mother of case 26 | |
| 26 | 9 February 2020 | 51 | Male | Korean | Siheung | Gyeonggi Provincial Medical Center Anseong Hospital, Anseong | No | 31 January 2020 (Guangdong) | Discharged (8 March 2020) | 12 | | |
| 27 | 9 February 2020 | 37 | Female | Chinese | Siheung | Gyeonggi Provincial Medical Center Anseong Hospital, Anseong | No | 31 January 2020 (Guangdong) | Discharged (7 March 2020) | 38 | Wife of case 26 | |
| 28 | 10 February 2020 | 30 | Female | Chinese | Goyang | Myongji Hospital, Goyang | Yes | 20 January 2020 | Discharged (17 February 2020) | 1 | Friend of case 3 | |
| 29 | 16 February 2020 | 82 | Male | Korean | Seoul | Seoul National University Hospital, Seoul | No | (Infection in Domestic) | Discharged (March 2020) | 117 | Friend of case 83 | |
| 30 | 16 February 2020 | 68 | Female | Korean | Seoul | Seoul National University Hospital, Seoul | No | (Infection in Domestic) | Discharged (March 2020) | 27 | Wife of case 29 | |

=== 18 February – 29 February ===
Shincheonji Daegu Church

On 18 February, South Korea confirmed its 31st case in Daegu, a member of the Shincheonji religious organisation. The patient continued to go to gatherings of Shincheonji days after showing symptoms, which are typically held with people in very close proximity and include physical contact of the members. Many of the patient's close contacts would turn out to be infected, triggering a drastic escalation of the South Korean spread of confirmed cases of SARS-CoV-2 infection.

On 19 February, the number of confirmed cases increased by 20. On 20 February 70 new cases were confirmed, giving a total of 104 confirmed cases, according to the KCDC. KCDC attributed the sudden jump of 70 cases linked to "Patient No. 31", who had participated in a gathering in Daegu at the Shincheonji Church of Jesus the Temple of the Tabernacle of the Testimony.

On 20 February, the streets of Daegu were empty in reaction to the Shincheonji outbreak. A resident described the reaction, stating "It's like someone dropped a bomb in the middle of the city. It looks like a zombie apocalypse." The first death was reported in a mental ward of Cheongdo Daenam Hospital in Cheongdo County. According to the mayor of Daegu, the number of suspected cases as of 21 February was 544 among 4,400 examined followers of the church. The hospital was suspected as the source of an outbreak after it was visited by a woman who became the second fatal case of South Korea on that day. Upon investigation, it was determined that the infection had spread to that hospital through a funeral ceremony attended by members of the church.

All South Korean military bases were on lockdown after three soldiers tested positive for the virus. Airlines cut connections and cultural schedules were canceled due to fears of further spread. United States Forces Korea raised the alert level from low to moderate and cut off non-essential travel to and from USFK Daegu. USFK Daegu's school facilities were closed and non-essential personnel were ordered to stay at home while any visitors going there were not allowed to enter. USFK announced that the widow of a retired soldier who was in Daegu was diagnosed to be positive for the virus on 24 February. Camp Humphreys enacted virus detection protocols, including temperature checks and raised the alert level to high. On 26 February, an American soldier based at Camp Carroll was diagnosed to be positive and was quarantined away from bases via off-base housing unit with contact tracing done that showed his movements to Camp Walker.

As of 22 February, among 9,336 followers of the church, 1,261 reported symptoms. At the time, 169 confirmed cases involved the same church and another 111 came from the Cheongdo Daenam Hospital. 23 February saw another 123 cases with 75 being from Shincheonji and 24 February saw 161 additional cases with 129 being from the same religious group. Over 27,000 people were tested for the virus with 19,127 negative results.

On 24 February, 15 countries imposed travel restrictions to and from South Korea. It was reported that a senior health official overseeing the COVID-19 efforts in Daegu tested positive and was also a member of Shincheonji. Within a few days, a petition to the nation's president urging for the disbandment of the church had over 750,000 signatures. Their headquarters in Gwacheon was raided by law enforcement and government officials said all 245,000 members of the religious group would be found and tested.

On 28 February, over 2,000 confirmed cases were reported.

=== March ===
On 2 March, there were over 4,200 confirmed cases. With an additional 4,000 cases of COVID-19 within two weeks, and roughly 60% of the total infections nationwide having stemmed from the church, the government of Seoul asked prosecutors to press charges against the religious group's founder and senior members for murder, causing harm, and for violating the Infectious Disease Control and Prevention Act. Interviews were held with all 230,000 members of the religious group and nearly 9,000 were said to be showing symptoms of the virus. Due to the number of infections in the country, ninety-five countries banned or limited entry for South Korean passport holders. Testing was also conducted at drive-through testing sites where patients did not leave their vehicles, but were met by medical personnel in hazmat suits over several stations. The process was completed in a few minutes and results available in several days.

On 8 March, KCDC in South Korea announced that 79.4% of confirmed COVID-19 cases were related to group infection. KCDC also announced that outbreak associated with Shincheonji Church totaled 4,482 infections, accounting for 62.8% of the total confirmed cases.

13 March was the first time since the outbreak on 20 January in which the number of recoveries, 177, was larger than the number of those who newly tested positive, 110. The cluster of cases in the Seoul Capital Area, raised fears that infections could rise sharply.

The controversy about Shincheonji also continued and generated international interest. After the lawsuit started by the Mayor of Seoul, the police raided the church premises to check whether the list of members supplied by Shincheonji pursuant to a request by the authorities was, as the Mayor argued, not complete. The authorities checked the list seized during the raid with the one Shincheonji had supplied and concluded that discrepancies were minor.

The United States Commission on International Religious Freedom (USCIRF) expressed concern that religious freedom rights of Shincheonji members may have been violated in South Korea by "exaggerating the church's role in the outbreak", and stated that, "USCIRF has received reports of individuals encountering discrimination at work and spousal abuse because of their affiliation with the church." USCIRF reported that South Korean "Vice Minister of Health Kim Kang-lip has publicly stated that the Shincheonji church has cooperated with authorities." The Belgian NGO Human Rights Without Frontiers and CESNUR released a "White Paper" claiming that, although it did make "mistakes" in its management of the crisis, Shincheonji had also been discriminated against because of its status as an unpopular group in South Korea.

On 17 March, around 79 church devotees were infected with the virus after attending the River of Grace Community Church. The infections were claimed to have been caused by spraying salt-water into followers' mouths, under the belief that this would protect them from the virus. Nearly 140 churches in Gyeonggi Province, which surrounds Seoul and is part of the Seoul Metropolitan Area, were threatened with closure if they did not implement preventive measures, including temperature checks, two-meter separation, and the wearing of masks. As more churches were holding services despite a government order for social distancing, on 30 March, the controversial Manmin Central Church in Guro, Seoul became a cluster with 22 infections linked to a gathering in early March in which the group was preparing stock footage to use for online worship services. Other church clusters appeared in the cities of Suwon, Busan, Geochang, and Bucheon.

=== April ===
Infection rates rose outside Korea, leading to 476 of 9,661 cases being imported by 30 March. The KCDC implemented stronger infectious disease control measures for international arrivals on 1 April, and new self-quarantine measures for travelers coming from Europe or the United States. For example, those showing symptoms but who test negative, and those who are without symptoms and are staying for a short time in Korea, need to quarantine for two weeks in a government provided facility. Costs for the stay at the facility were the responsibility of the individual and total 100,000 won (US$81) per day. A few days later, a Taiwanese woman was deported on 5 April for refusing to stay in a quarantine facility as she initially agreed, and then later disagreed with paying for the cost of staying at the government designated facility.

A total of 45 people were investigated by the police for allegedly violating COVID-19 self-isolation. Under the revised anti-infectious disease law, violators can face up to a year in prison, a 10 million won fine, or in the case of foreign passport holders—deportation.

Seeing the infodemic on COVID-19 information starting in China and spreading to Korea and the US, fake news researcher Cha Meeyoung of KAIST and the Institute for Basic Science, along with researchers from Ewha Womans University, started the multilingual Facts Before Rumors campaign to separate common claims seen online.

A Canadian cast member with the touring The Phantom of the Opera stage play entered Korea on 12 March, participated for roughly two weeks, and tested positive 2 April. An American colleague tested positive on 4 April, which shut down production of the musical until 14 April while the venue could be disinfected and contacts of the staff, those staying in the same hotel, and over 8,000 people who recently attended were contacted by health authorities who told them to stay indoors and contact a testing centre if they develop symptoms.

On 13 April, it was reported that at least 116 individuals who were infected and later cleared of the virus had again tested positive. The cause for this is under investigation but early speculation considered faulty tests, reactivation of the virus instead of re-infection, or remnants of the virus might remain yet not be harmful to the host or other individuals. The nation also stated their plans to send 600,000 testing kits to the United States and asked people to continue social distancing while hinting that a loosening of these regulations might come in the near future. By 17 April, the KCDC stated that it knew of 163 patients who were said to have recovered, but again tested positive. The exact cause was not known but they stated several possibilities.

Patient number 31 was in the hospital 58 days, as of 14 April. Her single-occupancy room cost 400,000 KRW per day (roughly US$360) with a total hospital bill at that point more than 40 million won (roughly US$36,000). While she was at the time the longest hospitalized COVID-19 patient in Korea,

After several days with new infections numbering in the single digits (on 18, 20, and 22 April), the government announced it was going to start lifting restrictions starting with stores, restaurants, gyms, cram schools, bars, and religious services; which is notable as most of the nation's infections came from places of worship. In coming weeks, arboretums, forests and national parks will begin to open with social distancing still in place until at least early May. After seeing Korea successfully lower cases of infection, President Moon Jae-in has engaged in "coronavirus diplomacy" with leaders of other nations, part of which involved exporting test kits to more than 20 countries. On 26 April, confirmed patient number 31 in Daegu was discharged after 67 days. With one of the longest hospital stays in the country at that point, her single-occupancy room cost 400,000 KRW per day (roughly US$360). As of 14 April, 4.9% of those infected had stayed in a hospital for more than 50 days. Another thousand people were quarantined for four weeks or more.

=== May–June ===
Number of cases (blue) and number of deaths (red) on a logarithmic scale, and number of deaths in the past ten days (dotted black), for February to October 2020

After a sustained period of new cases in the country numbering less than 20 a day, a new cluster emerged in central Seoul. A 29-year-old patient from Yongin was found to have visited at least five nightclubs in Itaewon during the late night hours of 1 May and the early morning hours of 2 May. After having gone to other places in Seoul and neighboring Gyeonggi and Gangwon provinces, he tested positive for COVID-19 and was admitted to a hospital in Suwon. His more than 1,300 contacts, several among them being difficult to identify and trace, were urged to self-isolate and have themselves tested for the virus. Because of this incident, the government of Seoul ordered all clubs, bars, room salons, and other nightlife establishments in the city to close indefinitely. By 10 May, the number of cases in the cluster had increased to 54, and 79 by 11 May. As multiple media outlets identified at least one of the bars as a gay bar, the LGBT community in Seoul feared an anti-gay backlash; social media users threatened to track and stop the "immoral acts" in some of the nightclubs.

On 17 June 2020, reports surfaced of long-distance COVID-19 transmission within a restaurant in Jeonju, Korea. In a five-minute window, one infected individual was reported to have infected two other individuals sitting at 6.5 m (21 ft) and 4.8 m (16 ft) away. An air conditioner in the restaurant was measured to have a maximum airflow of 1 m/s (3.3 ft/s) and 1.2 m/s (3.9 ft/s) between the individuals. The Korea Disease Control and Prevention Agency opened an investigation using CCTV footage and cell phone location data.

Persistent local groups of infections in the Seoul Metropolitan Area continued to be found in South Korea, which led to KCDC director Jeong Eun-kyeong saying in June that the country had entered the second wave of infections. A WHO official disagreed with the assessment that the country was in a second wave.

=== August ===
16 August 2020 saw the highest number of cases (297) since March 2020. The Sarang Jeil Church, led by Reverend Jeon Kwang-hoon, became a new centre of infections. The pastor was accused of obstructing contact tracing and violating rules regarding self-isolation. Thousands of people attended protests in central Seoul on 15 August, raising new fears for infections. Reverend Jeon has accused the government of "pour(ing) the virus on the church." He appeared at the anti-government rallies on 15 August, which were attended by over 10,000 people. Authorities ordered 12 high-risk business categories including nightclubs, karaoke bars and buffet restaurants, but also museums, to cease operations in Seoul, Incheon and the neighbouring Gyeonggi province. Furthermore, authorities banned indoor gatherings of more than 50 people, and outdoor ones of more than 100.

=== September ===
After new case numbers dropped, with closer to 100 cases per day, authorities eased some restrictions in the Seoul Metropolitan Area on 13 September, introducing new rules for a two-week period. The new rules allowed franchise cafes and bakeries to have customers drink and eat inside, dining at restaurants after 9 p.m., and indoors gyms and after-school academics to reopen. The requirement for these facilities to impose distancing rules such as having visitors sit at least one seat apart from each other or wear masks continued to be in place.

=== October ===
On 12 October, after new cases numbers dropped below 100 per day, authorities relaxed some more social distancing measures.

=== November ===
Due to the infection rates climbing back to over nearly 300 a day, the government increased the social distancing requirement to 1.5 m in the capital. High-risk areas like bars, clubs, and religious facilities were only allowed to accommodate up to 30% of their maximum capacity. Schools limited their population to two-thirds. The government urged students in study cafes, cram schools, and Internet cafes to increase control measures.

=== December ===
COVID-18 infection rates increased in December, as Korea went through its third wave. The Korea Disease Control and Prevention Agency said there were 1,132 new coronavirus cases on 25 December, not too far off the highest record of 1,241 logged on Christmas Eve. The sudden spike in infections was linked to hospitals, nursing homes, churches, prisons, and family gatherings during the holidays. On 27 December, the Korea Disease Control and Prevention Agency confirmed that a new strain of COVID entered the country through a family of three that travelled from the UK to South Korea.

=== 2021 ===
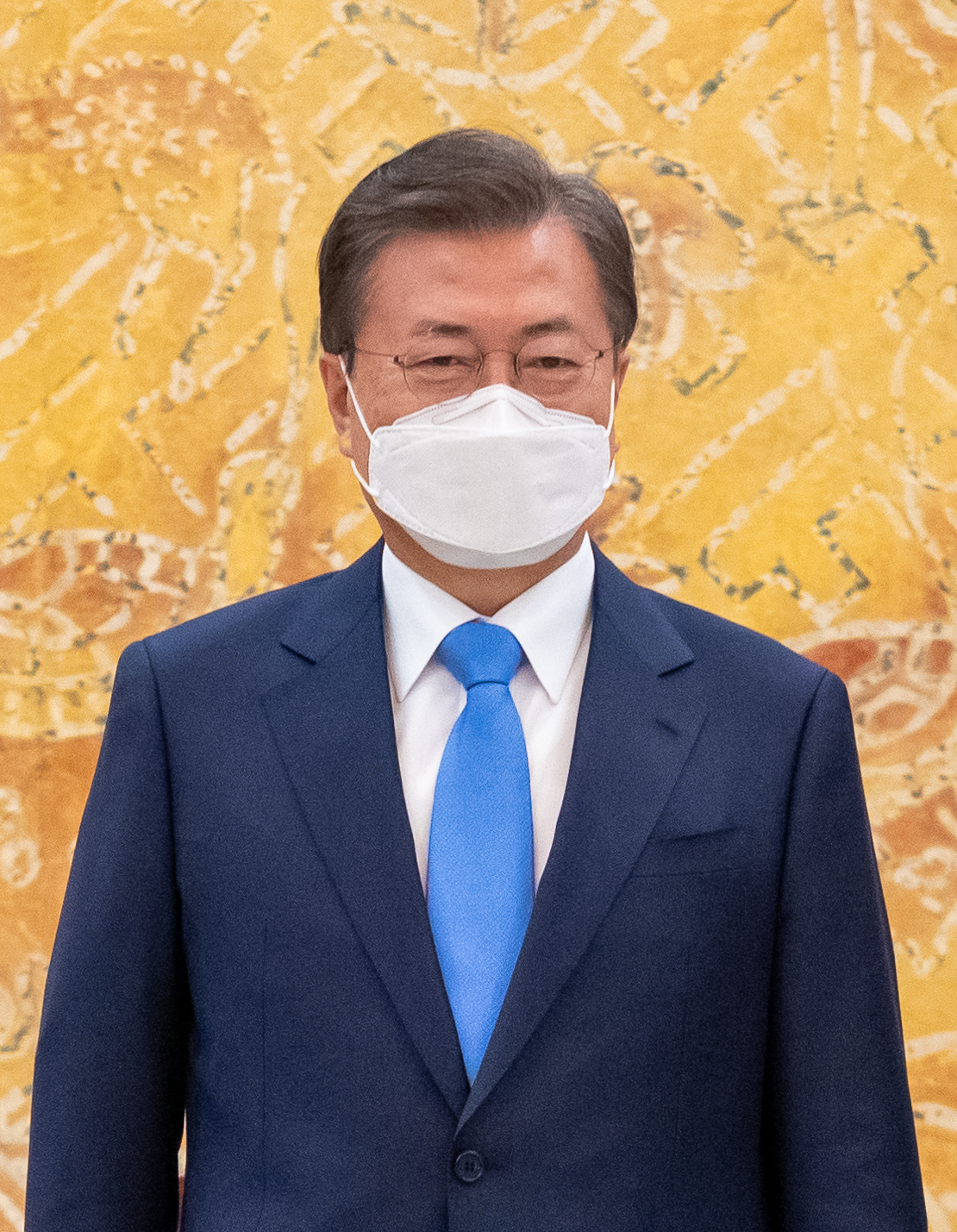
President Moon Jae-in wearing a protective mask in March 2021

On 10 February 2021, South Korea granted its first approval of a COVID-19 vaccine to Oxford–AstraZeneca, allowing the two-shot regimen to be administered to all adults, including the elderly. The approval came with a warning that consideration was needed when administering the vaccine to individuals over 65 years of age due to limited data from that demographic in clinical trials.

On 14 April 2021, South Korea reported 731 new confirmed cases, the most since January 2021; authorities anticipated a possible fourth wave. An additional 250,000 doses of Pfizer/BioNTech vaccines arrived the country.

By 22 April 2021, the country had 118,243 confirmed cases in total, with 1,812 deaths.

On 19 July 2021, it was reported that 247 out of 301 crew members of the 34th contingent of the Cheonghae Unit on the Munmu the Great tested positive for COVID-19. Two Korean Air Force KC-330s departed with 200 replacement crew so the entire 301-member crew could be transported back to South Korea. 270 of those crew members later tested positive.

=== 2022 ===
On 24 January 2022, as the Omicron variant spread, South Korea's daily new coronavirus infections reached 8,571, exceeding the previous high and fueling worries of another wave when tens of millions travel across the country for the upcoming Lunar New Year.

In March, new infections totalled 10 million and deaths were 8,420. This reduced to 3.9 million in April, with 6,285 deaths recorded.

== Public information ==
The South Korean government provided citizens with information in Korean, English, Chinese, and Japanese on how to avoid infection and how to prevent spreading the disease. This included cough etiquette, when and how to wear a face mask, and the importance of physical distancing and staying at home.

The South Korean government also sent daily emergency notifications detailing information on locations with reported infections, and other status updates related to the pandemic.

== Containment ==
In its efforts to fight and contain the virus, South Korea combined testing with contact tracing.

Infected South Koreans were required to go into isolation in government shelters. Their phones and credit card data were used to trace their prior movements and find their contacts. People who were determined to have been near the infected individual received phone alerts with information about their prior movements.

According to Chun Byung-Chul (epidemiologist at Korea University), high-risk patients who have underlying illnesses were prioritized for hospitalization. Patients with moderate symptoms were sent to "repurposed corporate training facilities and spaces provided by public institutions," where they received observation and medical support. Patients who recovered and tested negative twice were released. Close contacts and infected individuals with minimal symptoms who could measure their own temperatures and whose family members were free of any chronic disease were required to self-quarantine for two weeks. Local monitoring teams called the quarantined twice a day to make sure that they stayed where they were and to ask about symptoms.

Those ordered to self-quarantine were required to download an app that alerted officials if the patient moved out of the quarantine. Violators were fined up to $2,500.

== Lifting of restrictions ==
There was no general lockdown of businesses in South Korea with supermarkets and other retailers remaining open. Kindergartens, schools, universities, cinemas, gyms were closed soon after the outbreak with schools and universities having online classes.

By 18 April 2020, South Korea detected only single-digit numbers of new cases a day. Pre-season baseball was scheduled to start 20 April, without fans in the stands, with the regular season to start in early May. It was the second country in the world, after Taiwan, to hold baseball games in 2020. Temperature checks, masks when not playing, and other precautionary measures were taken.

South Korea's professional soccer league, K-League, was the first major soccer league to resume play since the coronavirus pandemic started. There were restrictions on talking and spitting.

On 20 May, schools began to reopen in the city of Incheon, after two students tested positive for coronavirus, so students were sent home. On 28 May, the Korean CDC reported 79 new cases (all but 10 at a distribution centre in Bucheon), and this led to hundreds of schools closing and 838 continuing with remote learning.

In December 2021, tougher restrictions were reinstated amidst record numbers of infections and critically ill patients.

== Impacts ==
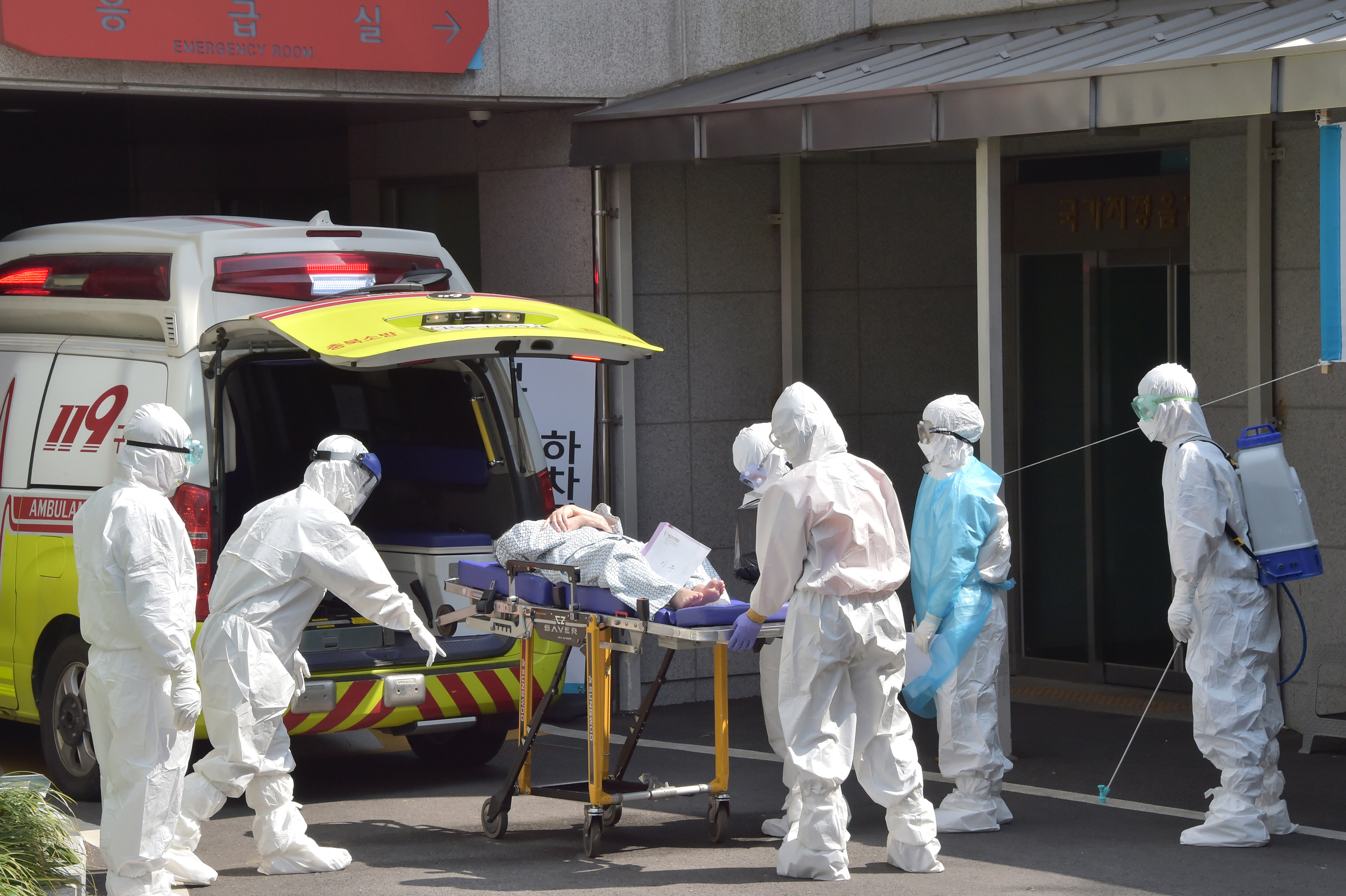
Transfer of a COVID-19 confirmed patient by Busan Medical Center

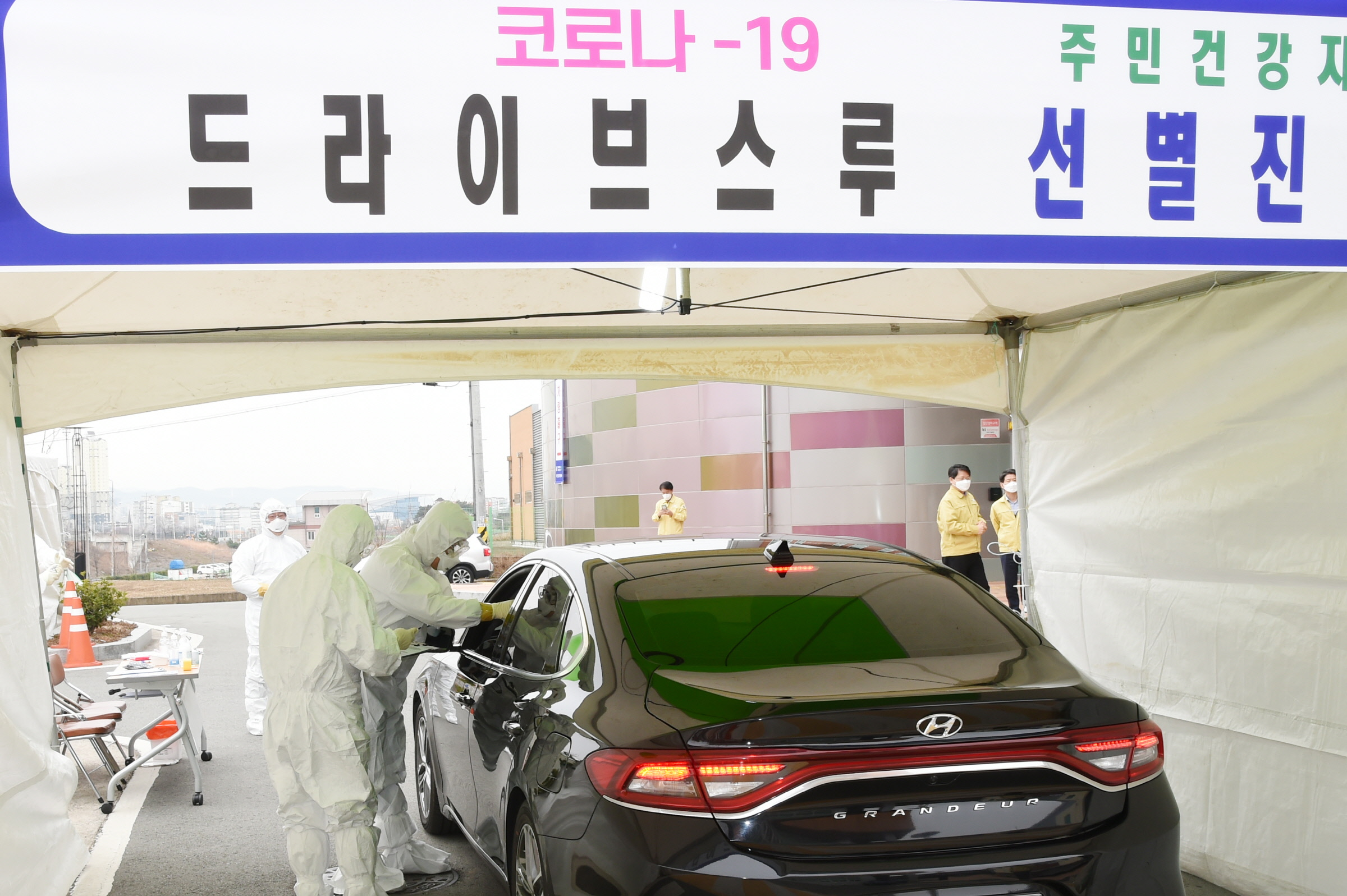
Medical staff at a drive-through test center examine patients with suspected COVID-19.

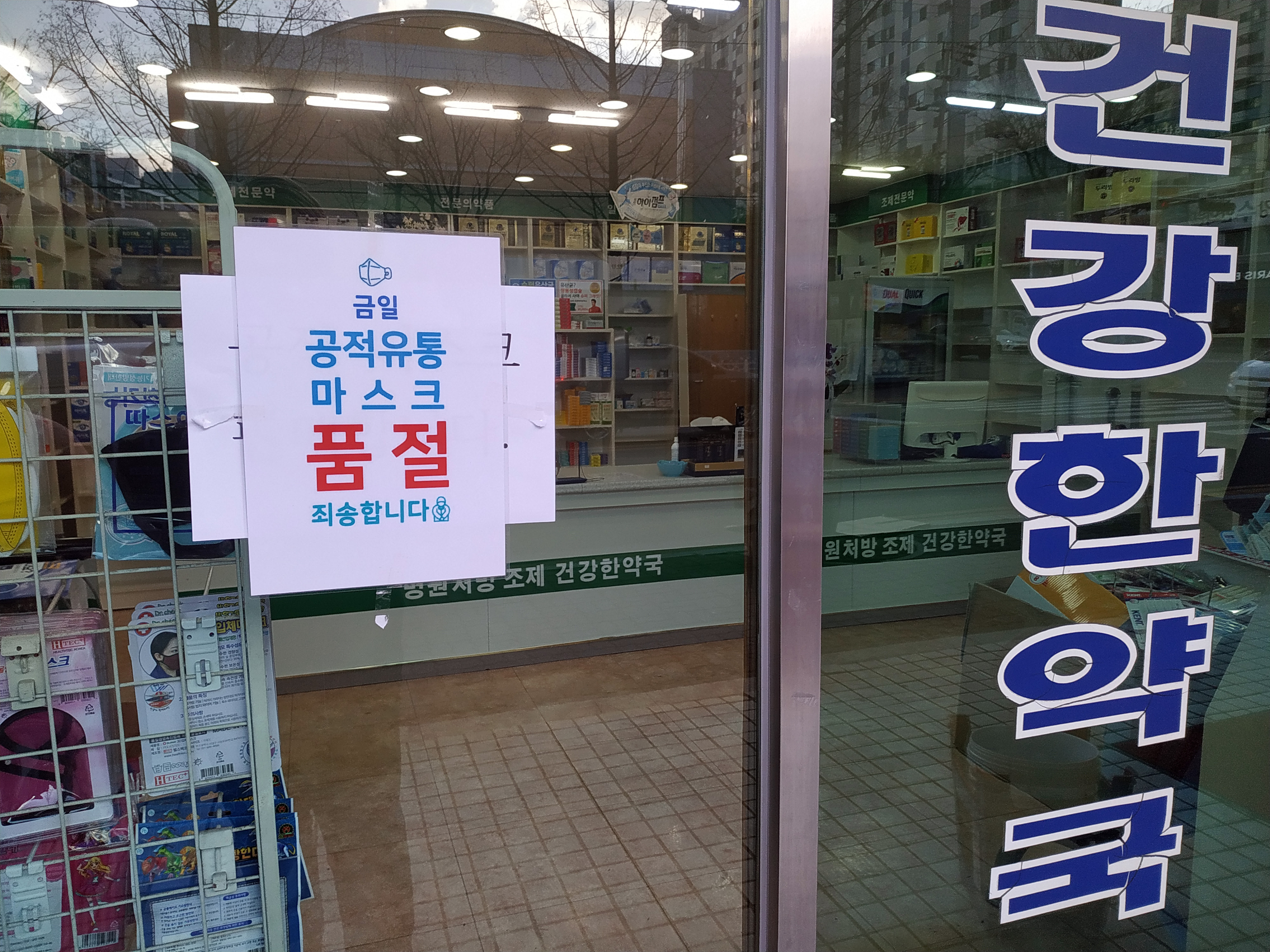
Sign in Daejeon pharmacy stating that all masks are sold out

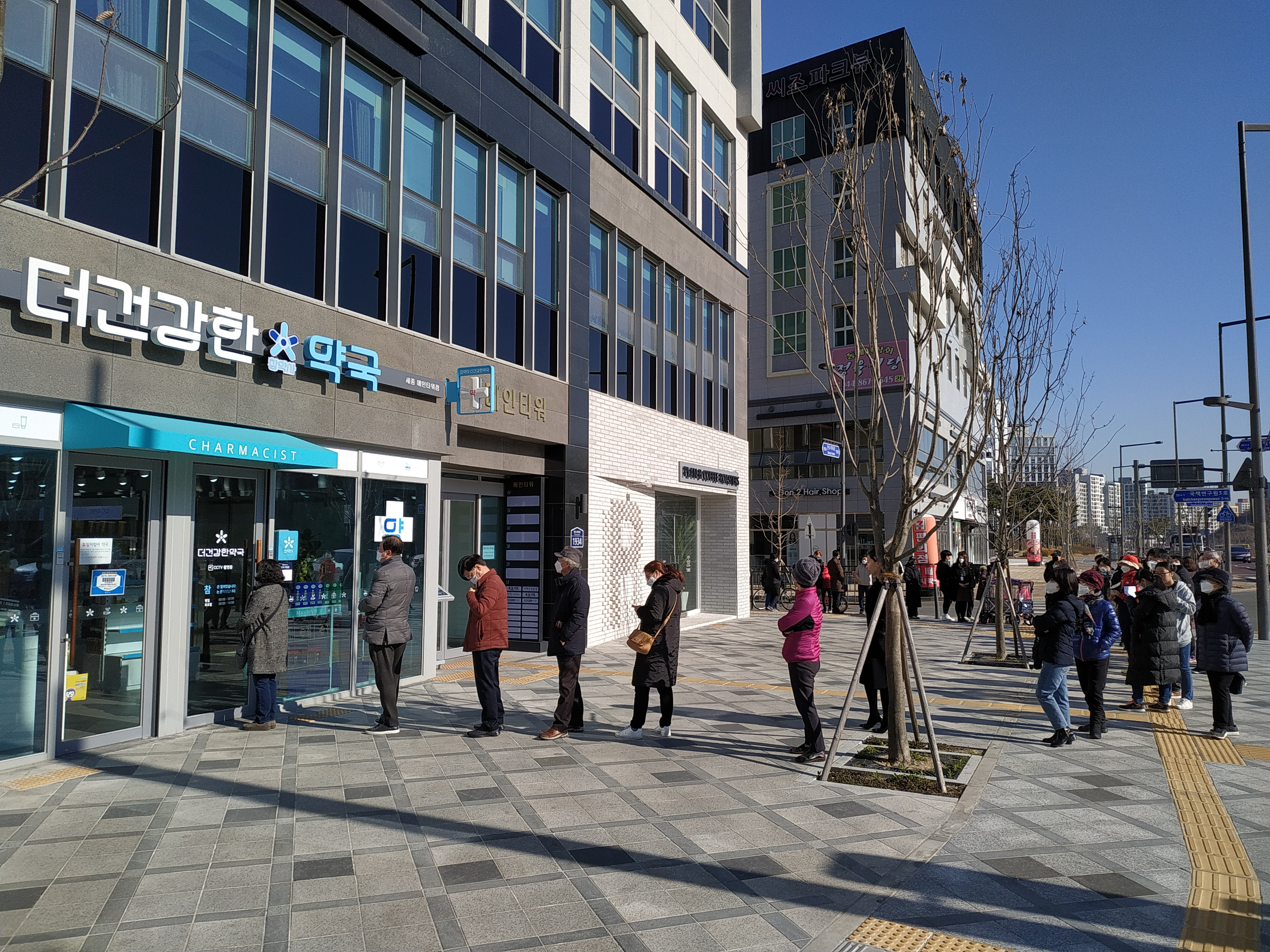
Line outside a pharmacy in Sejong City awaiting the store to open so they can buy masks

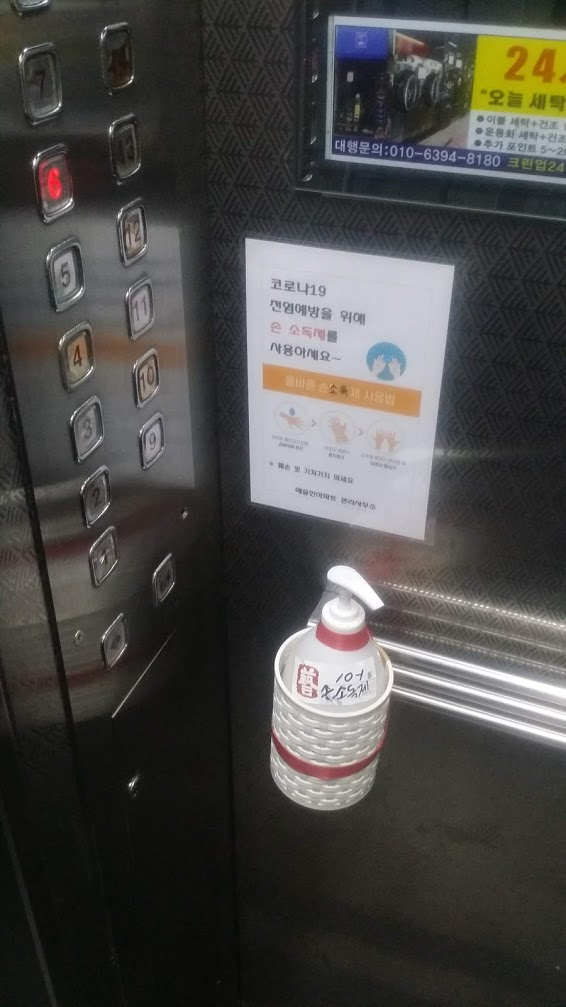
Hand sanitizer in public elevator in South Korea

=== Economy ===
By 18 March 2020, South Korea's KOSPI stock index had dropped nearly 30% from a month earlier. The drop began on 23 February, when the country raised the coronavirus alert to 'highest level'. On 15 March, the KOSPI closed at 1,771.44 and the Kosdaq finished at 524 points, down 7%, prompting the Financial Supervisory Commission to impose a six-month ban on short-selling, the first such action in nearly nine years. This was despite a markedly lower daily increase in cases. Automaker Hyundai Motor Company, having shut down its factories as the outbreak intensified, saw exports drop 21.4% in February from one year prior.

On 19 February 2020, at the 7th Ministerial Meeting on the Economy in 2020, the government provided 136.7 billion won in funds to local governments. The government also organized the procurement of masks and other hygiene equipment.

=== Social impact ===
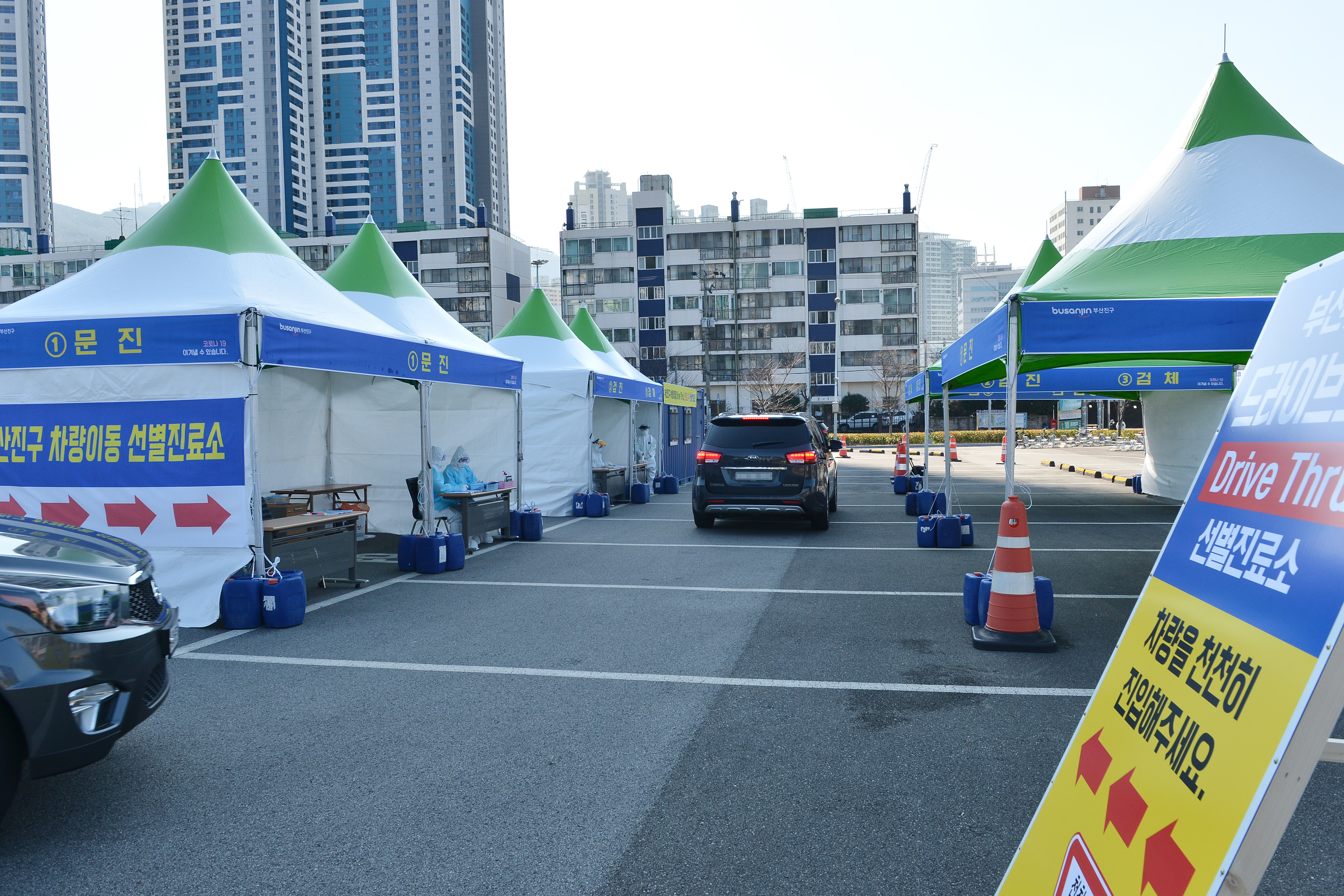
Drive-through test center in Busan

As of 25 February, Daegu officials were aggressively warning residents to take precautions while allowing private businesses such as restaurants to stay open. As a precautionary measure, many restaurants check the temperatures of their customers before accepting them. It is common for "offices, hotels, and other large buildings" to use thermal image cameras in order to identify people with fevers. All Daegu's public libraries, museums, churches, day-care centres and courts had been closed.

Apart from the city of Daegu and the church community involved, most of South Korea was operating close to normal, although nine planned festivals were closed and tax-free retailers closed. The South Korean military manpower agency made an announcement that conscription from Daegu will temporarily be suspended. The Daegu Office of Education decided to postpone the start of every school in the region by one week.

Numerous educational institutes have temporarily shut down, including dozens of kindergartens in Daegu and several elementary schools in Seoul. As of 18 February, most universities in South Korea had announced plans to postpone the start of the spring semester. This included 155 universities planning to delay the semester start by two weeks to 16 March, and 22 universities planning to delay the semester start by one week to 9 March. Also, on 23 February 2020, all kindergartens, elementary schools, middle schools, and high schools were announced to delay the semester start from 2 to 9 March.

In the K-pop industry, the rapid spread of the coronavirus within South Korea led to the cancellations or postponing of concerts and other events for K-pop acts within and outside of South Korea, for example the cancellation of the remaining Asia dates and the Europe leg for Seventeen's Ode To You Tour on 9 February 2020 and the cancellation of all Seoul dates for BTS' Map of the Soul Tour. Entertainment agency SM Entertainment reportedly donated five hundred million won in efforts to fight the disease.

Due to record numbers of cases in December 2021, tighter restrictions were reinstated, prompting small business owners with shaven heads to protest against the government curbs and demand compensation for their losses.

=== Travel restrictions ===
South Korea Entrance refused to people from South Korea Entrance refused to people from some areas of South Korea Imposed quarantine on people arriving from South Korea Other restrictions (self-quarantines, medical examination requirements, monitoring measures)

As of 20 March, a total of 171 countries and territories had issued entry bans or suspended visas for travelers from South Korea. On 16 March, USFK announced that travel restrictions for Cheonan had been removed due to a decline in COVID-19 cases. Troops and Defense Department personnel residing in Cheonan were told to "contact their command prior to returning to work."

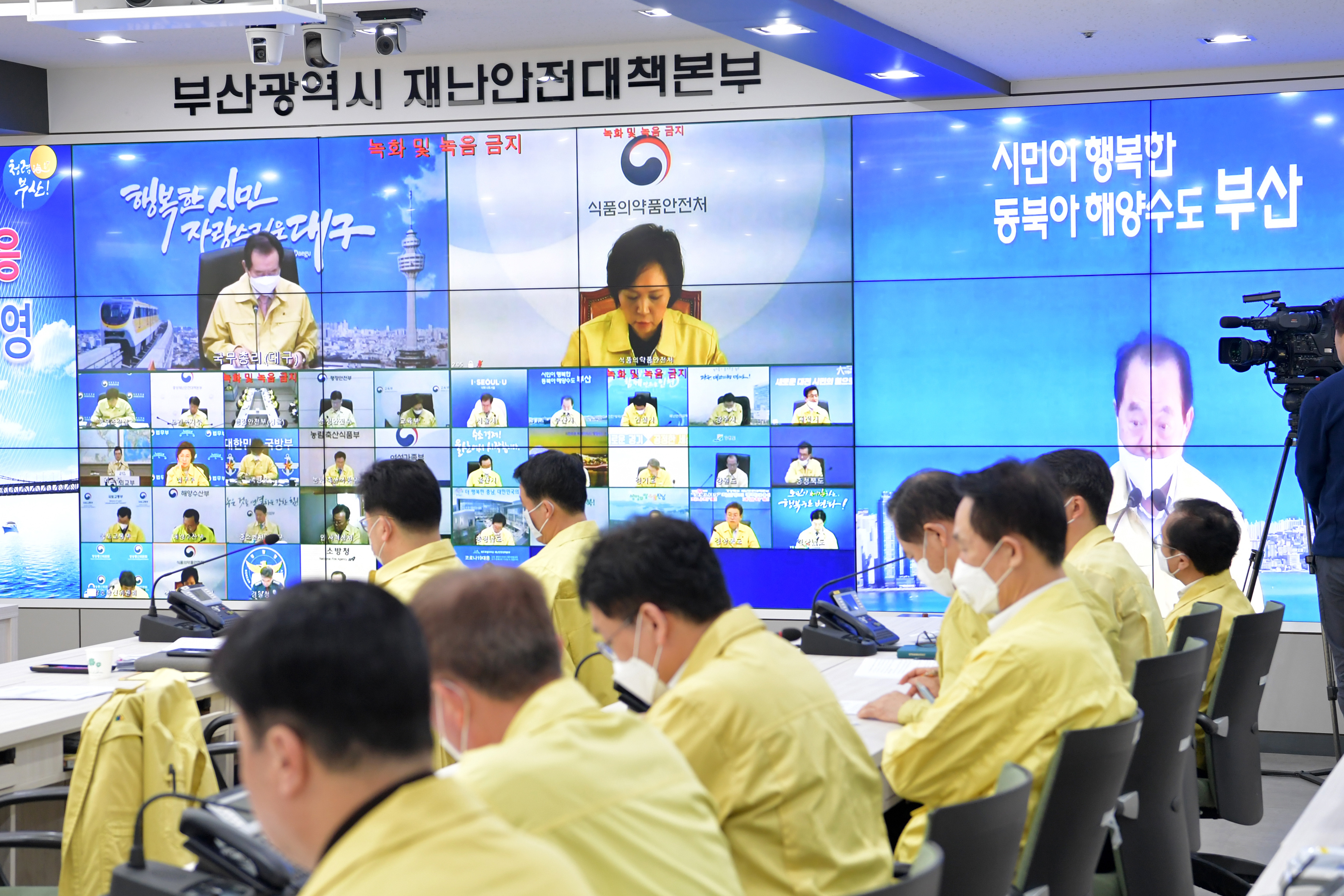
Videotelephony of Central Disaster and Safety Countermeasure Headquarters

=== International response ===
On 24 February, the United States Centers for Disease Control and Prevention (CDC) upgraded the status of South Korea to level 3 (avoid non-essential travels due to widespread community transmission).

On 28 February, Charles Schwab Corporation advised employees who had travelled to China and South Korea to self-quarantine for 14 days. Multiple companies such as Amazon, Google, TD Bank Group, Bank of Nova Scotia, London Stock Exchange Group, and Cargill, Inc. deferred all non-essential travel to areas affected by the outbreak.

As of 8 March, US military has suspended all travels to and from South Korea for all military personnel and their family over the concern of the virus.

As of 10 March 109 countries or regions restrict the entry of visitors from South Korea.

As of 23 October, 56 countries or regions restrict entry of visitors from South Korea.

== Reactions ==
=== Reactions from Korea Medical Association ===
On 26 January, the Korea Medical Association (KMA) asked the government to temporarily bar entry to all travelers arriving from mainland China, but this recommendation was not followed. On 27 January, KMA President Choi Dae-zip said: "The third confirmed case indicates that we have reached the point where we have to get rid of passive stance and actively prepare for the worsening of the situation, (and) the government should thoroughly monitor the trend of China's national outbreak of the virus and prepare administrative measures such as complete entry ban from China in case of the worst situation." On 3 February, the KMA recommended halting all travel from China, rather than only from Hubei province. The KMA called for stronger government response in a total of six statements between 20 January, when the nation's first confirmed case occurred, and 18 February. A short time after that, cases spiked in Daegu and throughout the country.

=== Public reactions ===
==== Presidential approval rating ====
Although there were many confirmed cases of COVID-19 in early 2020, President Moon Jae-in's approval rating rose in early March by two percentage points to 44%. During the MERS crisis, the previous President Park Geun-hye's approval rating had fallen sharply to 29% due to inadequate management the MERS infection.

In the opinion poll conducted by Gallup Korea in the second week of March 2020, President Moon's approval rating had risen by 5% to 49%.

The second and third waves of COVID infections caused President Moon's approval ratings to plummet. Anger at the vaccine plan greatly undermined support for President Moon, whose disapproval rating had reached an all-time high of 60% by late December 2020.

==== Anti-foreigner sentiment ====
In February 2020, an entrance to a South Korean restaurant in downtown Seoul reportedly had a sign in red Chinese characters stating: "No Chinese Allowed." "No Chinese" signs were displayed and some businesses simply banned all foreigners. Some foreign residents were excluded from the government mask distribution program as it is currently only allowed to 1.25 million foreigners who were subscribed to the public health insurance. More than 760,000 South Korean citizens signed a petition lobbying the government to ban Chinese tourists from entering the country. The Daegu Lantern Festival briefly posted a notice in English that no foreigners were allowed to visit, reportedly as the result of a translation error by a PR agency. The original message from a Daugu official was to notify foreign tourists about the delayed schedule of the festival due to COVID-19. At least one Jamaican reported widespread discrimination, and foreigners were excluded from citywide stimulus funds, with the exception of Ansan. Due to the Itaewon cluster, on 10 May foreigners were urged to get tested, and some reported discrimination at work.

In March 2021, COVID-19 testing was ordered for all foreigners who worked in Gyeonggi-do, on penalty of a fine. The move was followed up by Seoul and other regions issuing similar orders. The moves were criticized by diplomats and other officials for being discriminatory. The Seoul order was eventually lifted, but other regions still carried out mandatory testing on foreign workers.

During the pandemic, members of the United States Forces Korea, and other foreign nationals were reported to have no-mask parties at Haeundae Beach in Busan for the U.S. Independence Day of 2020, and the Memorial Day of 2021, amid local social distancing restrictions and causing dissatisfaction among local residents.

==== Homophobia ====
On 1 May, a 29-year-old patient from Yongin visited several night clubs in Itaewon, a district in Seoul with multiple LGBTQ-friendly nightclubs. When the infection spread, homophobic comments were left on CCTV videos of the club in question. The mayor of Seoul threatened to send police to the homes of people who may have been infected, raising concerns over anti-LGBTQ harassment. Jeong Gol Lee, general director of an LGBTQ rights group in South Korea, said there had been many malicious reports about gay men since the Itaewon cluster emerged.

=== View of foreign media ===
The Washington Post has praised the South Korean government's handling of coronavirus outbreak and stated that South Korea is a model for the U.S. response instead of Iran. The Washington Post also appreciated South Korea's response as a successful model for democratic countries.

Agence France-Presse has compared South Korea's handling of coronavirus outbreak with China. The newspaper stated that "While China locked down cities, Seoul embraced widespread testing and public notice of movements of those infected, raising some privacy concerns". Also, AFP analyzed that the South Korean government handled the crisis using a model of open information, public participation, and widespread testing. Additionally, according to the paper, Masahiro Kami, a chairperson of the Tokyo-based Medical Governance Research Institute stated that South Korea is a good model for every country for handling the coronavirus outbreak.

WSJ analyzed the aggressive Coronavirus Test Program in South Korea. The government contacted the citizens proactively to test the coronavirus in various ways including a home visit, a quick 10 minutes drop off drive-through COVID-19 testing centre free of charge. Although South Korea did not stop the outbreak, experts credit the emphasis on energetic COVID-19 test program with reducing case numbers and fatalities.

UPI has analyzed that South Korea's model has worked on handling coronavirus outbreak without any further harder restrictions on foreigners. The paper also observed that Health authorities have aggressively promoted hygiene and social distancing. Additionally, according to the paper Kim Jong-hwan, an administrator at Seoul Metropolitan Eunpyeong Hospital positively evaluated the government's deal with coronavirus outbreak by stating that "The government's response has been so well-organized. I'm proud of it."

Time magazine and BBC News concluded that the reason for the high number of confirmed cases of the coronavirus in South Korea is thanks to the relative "openness" and "transparency" of South Korean society. The rapid spread of the virus was linked with the Shincheonji Church of Jesus, with a significant proportion of the early cases linked to religious services held by the group in Daegu. The Blue House announced on 28 February the current status of coronavirus tests in three countries: Korea, the United States, and Japan, and analyzed statistically the reasons why there were so many confirmed cases in South Korea: the number of inspections was 26 or 120 times higher than other countries. The cumulative number of inspections was about 53,000 in South Korea, with only 2,000 in Japan and 440 cases examined in the United States. After the tests, the rate of confirmed cases was highest in Japan (9.04%), followed by Korea (3.3%) and the United States (3.15%).

Bloomberg L.P. analyzed the reason for the low death rate in South Korea. South Korea experienced serious difficulties during the outbreak of MERS in 2015 due to a lack of test kits. Afterwards, the country approved the rapid deployment of COVID-19 test kits, and now they are able to test more than 10,000 people a day. In neighbouring Japan, only about 2,700 people in total had been tested for COVID-19 as of 3 March. Officials in Seoul operate "drive-through" testing stations for quick testing. Diagnostics company Seegene Inc. is also exporting its test kits to other countries including China, Europe and the US.

AFP attributed the factors behind the low death rate of South Korea to the rigorous testing and the infected population profile. South Korea's widespread testing leads to the identification of mild or asymptomatic cases. This lowers the proportion of death among the infected. Moreover, the infected population in South Korea has a unique profile. Most of the country's infections are linked to the Shincheonji Church of Jesus and most of its members are young women. Statistics show that the virus is most deadly among older generations and men. So the death rate in South Korea is lower than the rate in other countries.

CNN reported the innovative drive-through testing for COVID-19 in the northern city of Goyang, which was inspired by the drive-through counters at Starbucks. Reuters detailed the new testing facilities in South Korea. Several drive-through coronavirus screening centres were built, including roadside testing facilities. Their purpose is to diagnose patients quickly, while preventing the infection of others in, e.g., a hospital waiting room or a community health centre. The entire testing procedure takes several minutes. William Schaffner, a professor of preventive medicine and infectious diseases at Vanderbilt University School of Medicine, stressed the importance of the broad testing efforts in South Korea. It would provide us with an unclouded picture of the COVID-19 illness. Victoria's Chief Health Officer, Brett Sutton has recommended the drive-through coronavirus testing in Australia. On 10 March, Australia opened the first drive-through testing station in Adelaide.

Business Insider analyzed the difference of coverage of patient testing patients for COVID-19, comparing the US to South Korea. Per million citizens, South Korea tested 700 times more than the USA. Fortune explained South Korea's efforts of setting up several "drive-through" coronavirus screening facilities as contributing to testing thousands of samples a day.

By 10 March, CNN had an interview with South Korea health minister Park Neung-hoo. Park expressed cautiously his desire that the coronavirus outbreak had 'passed the peak' as the number of new daily infections had declined in recent days. The South Korean government had the ability to operate about 15,000 diagnostic tests per day and has conducted over 190,000 tests by 10 March nationwide. Park also answered the inquiry from CNN about practicable tips for controlling COVID-19. Park expressed his view that dealing with outbreaks by focusing efforts on early testing and global cooperation would be crucial instead of the lockdown option, as the virus could still spread quickly without testing. South Korean authorities have arranged the two types of facilities, one for about 10% of coronavirus patients who required hospitalization and another for the patients who were only experiencing mild symptoms.

== See also ==
- Coronavirus diseases, a group of closely related syndromes
- COVID-19 pandemic in Asia
- K-Quarantine
