= Tancheon =

Stream in Gyeonggi Province and Seoul, South Korea

Coordinates: 37°31′N 127°04′E

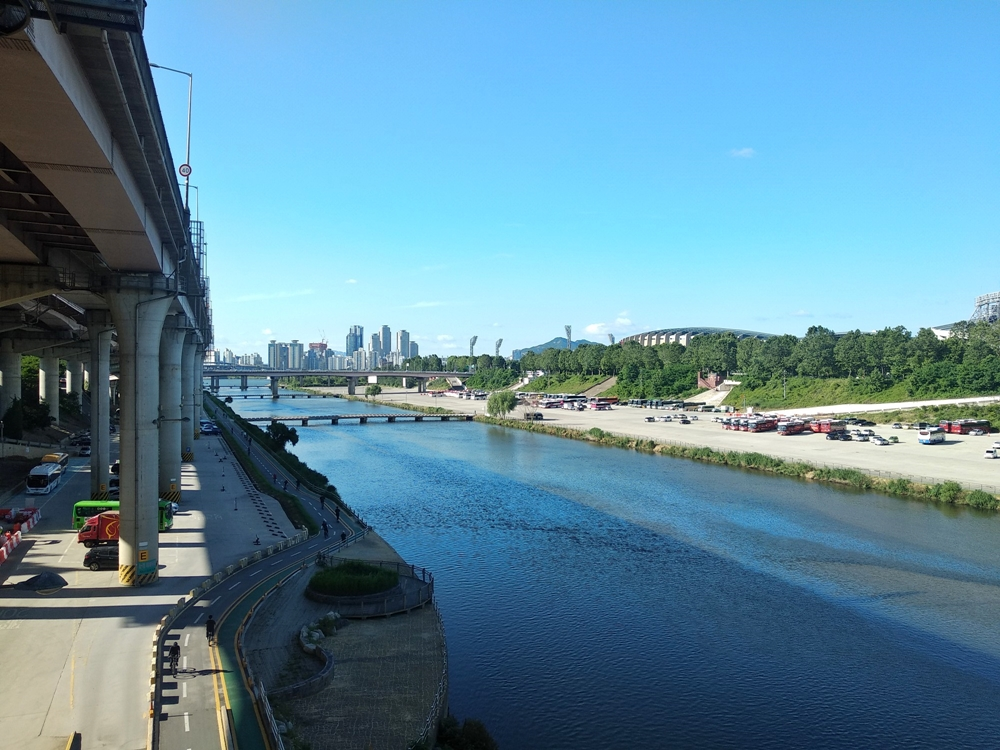

Korean name
- Hangul: 탄천
- Hanja: 炭川
- RR: Tancheon
- MR: T'anch'ŏn

Tancheon (Korean: 탄천; lit. charcoal stream) is a stream in Gyeonggi Province and Seoul, South Korea. The stream is a tributary of the Han River. It begins in Yongin, Gyeonggi Province, flows through Seongnam, and eventually into the Han. It has a total length of 32.66 km (20.29 mi).

The area also serves as a large park, and there are paths for both walkers and cyclists on each bank with occasional foot bridges joining the two sides in addition to the bridges built for vehicle traffic. Along the paths there are many benches as well as exercise equipment. The whole area is extremely popular among local residents.

== Toponymy ==
The original name for the stream may have been the native Korean word "Sutnae" (숯내; 순내; lit. charcoal stream). The meaning of this name was translated into Hanja (Chinese characters) as 炭川; this can then be read in Korean as "Tan-cheon" (탄천).

The "Sut" or "Tan" part of the name may have come from a place called "Sut-gol" (숯골) or "Tan-gol" (탄골); this was an area along the river that corresponds to the current Taepyeong-dong, Sujin-dong, and Sinheung-dong in Seongnam. That area was considered to produce much charcoal.

The stream was officially assigned its name during the 1910–1945 Japanese colonial period.

The stream has been known by many other names, such as Geomcheon (검천; 儉川), Heomcheon (험천; 險川), Meonae (머내), Cheonhocheon (천호천; 穿呼川), and Jancheon (잔천; 鵲川).

== Description ==
The stream originates from the mountain Beophwasan in Yongin. It flows north and merges with the stream Dongmakcheon in Gumi-dong. It then merges with the stream Jungcheon in Imae-dong, then with Yangjaecheon in Daechi-dong in Seoul. It then merges into the Han River near Seoul Olympic Stadium. It has a total length of 32.66 km (20.29 mi).

There are bicycle lanes and walking paths along the stream. Large apartment complexes line the stream. There is courts for sports such as tennis along the river.

=== Water parks ===
Along the approximately 25-kilometer stretch of the Tancheon that passes through Seongnam, there are five water parks open to the public. They are free of charge and popular with families with young children. The Tancheon water parks (탄천 물놀이장) are open every year from July 1 to August 31, from 10 a.m. to 8 p.m. At the parks there are changing rooms available as well as many chairs and picnic tables. They can be found at:

- Yatap-dong, in front of Manna Church (만나 교회앞)
- Jeongja-dong, in front of Singi Elementary School (신기 초등학교앞)
- Geumgok-dong, in front of Bulgok Middle School (불곡 중학교앞)
- Imae-dong, by the Unjung Stream footpath (운중천)
- Behind the Bundang district office (분당구청뒤)

== History ==
Before the 1920s, Yangjaecheon and Tancheon merged into the Han river at different points. However, the 1925 flood of the Han River caused the course of the two streams to change. The quality of the water in the river declined in the 1990s, during the rapid development of Seongnam. However, it gradually improved after then.

== Gallery ==
These photographs are in order from south to north, i.e. from source to mouth.

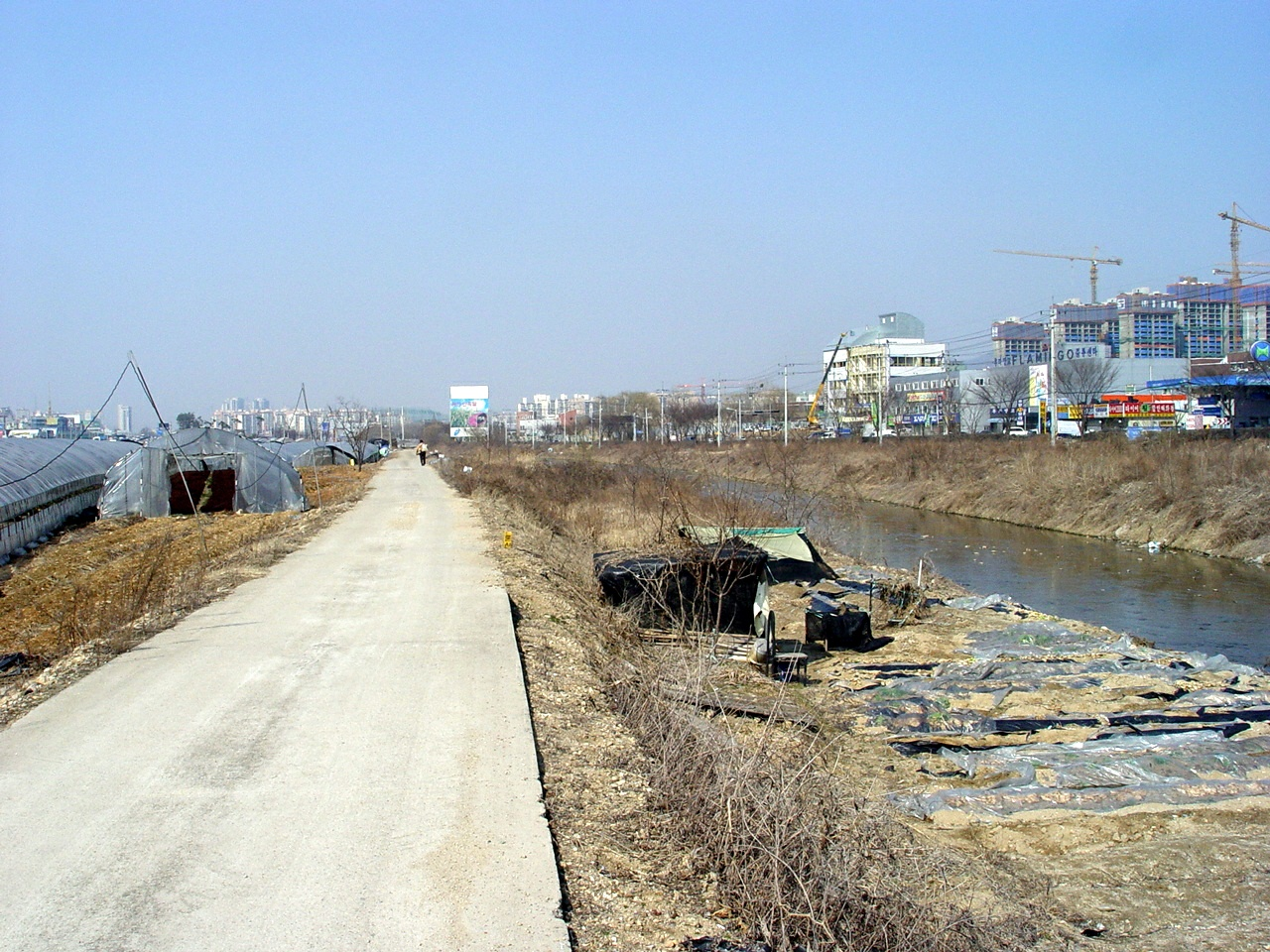
Looking north from near Bojeong, Yongin

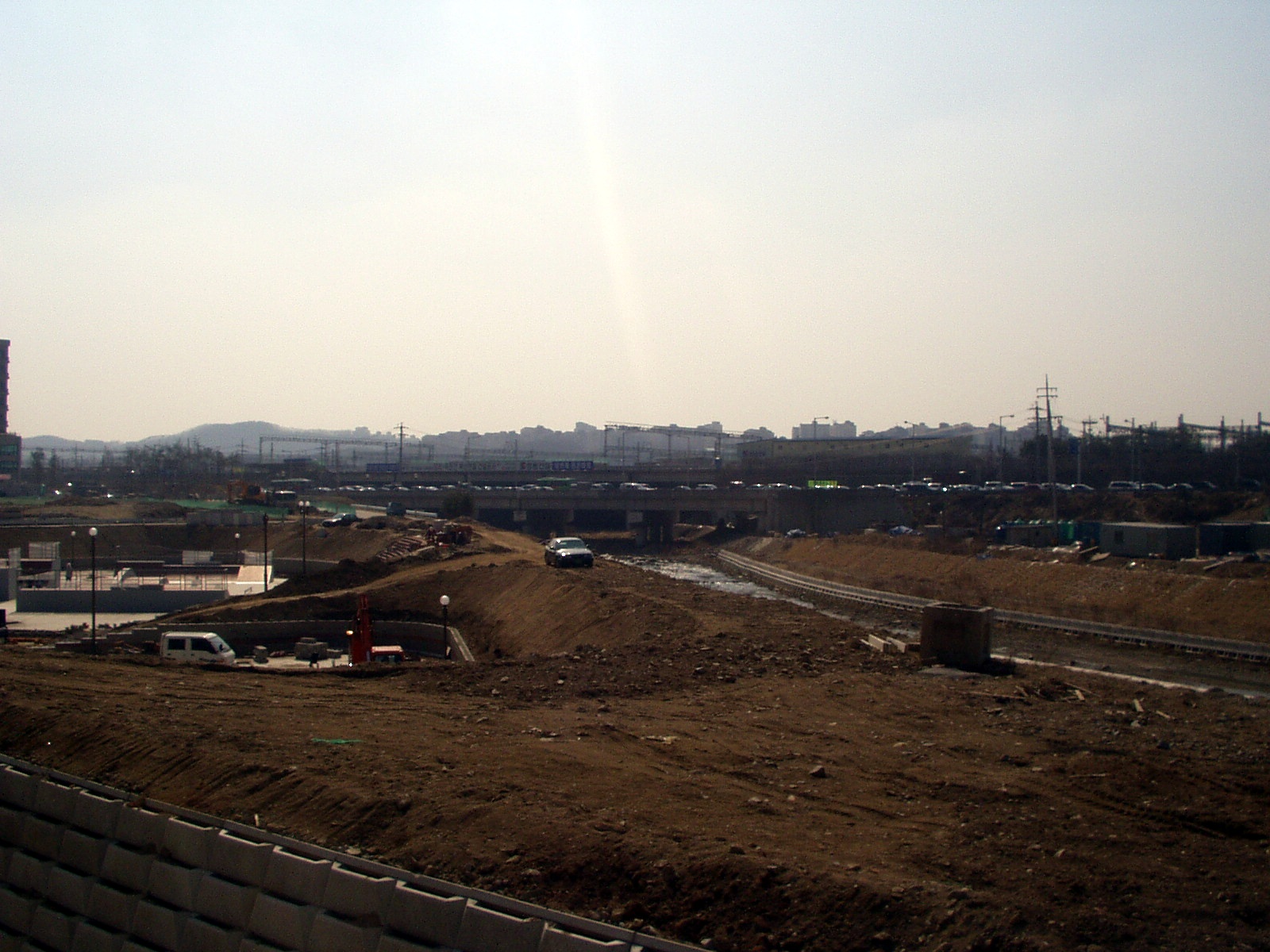
In Jukjeon, Yongin

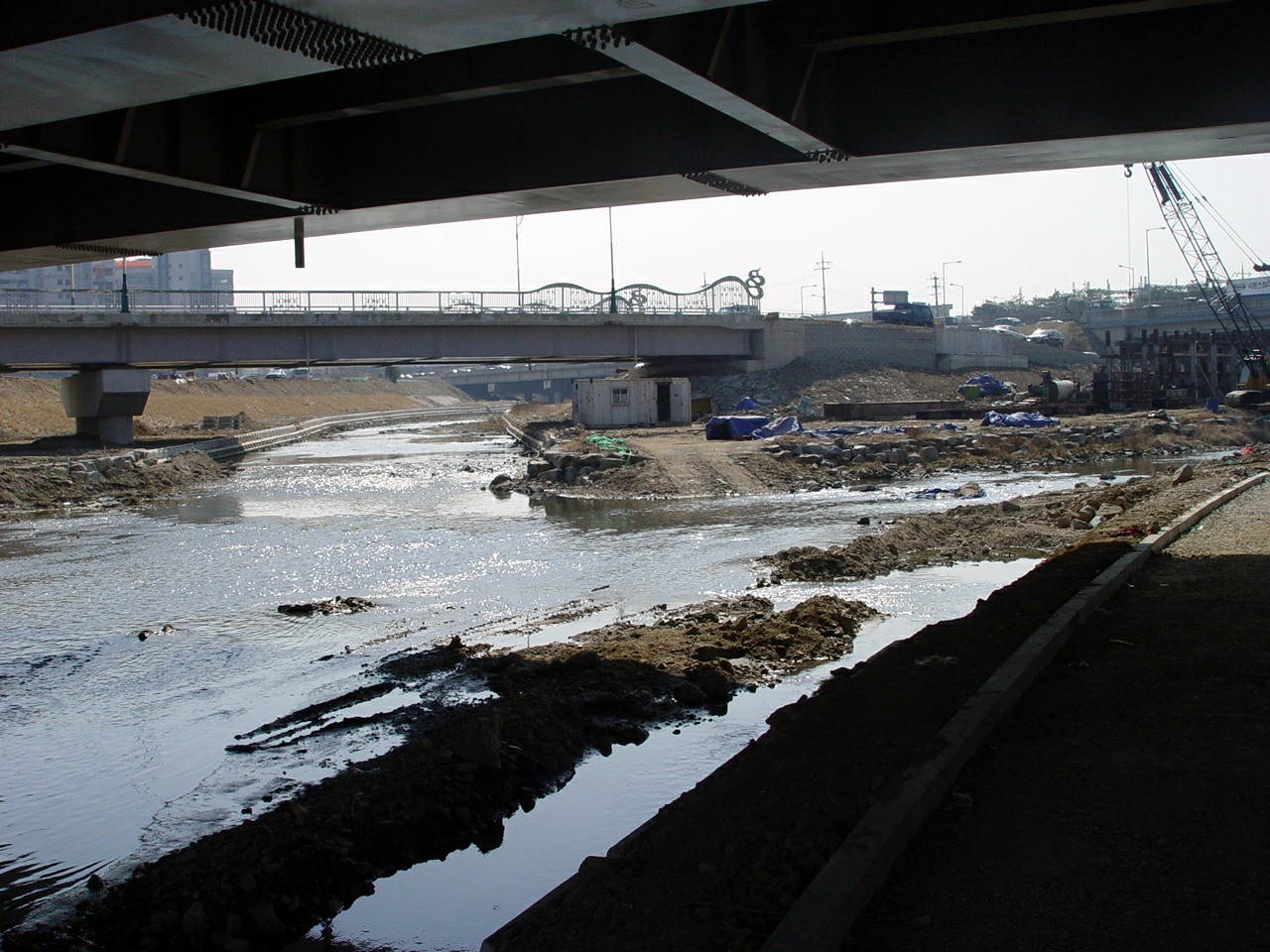
The Pungdeokcheon joins the Tancheon from the south-west (right of photo) in Jukjeon, Yongin

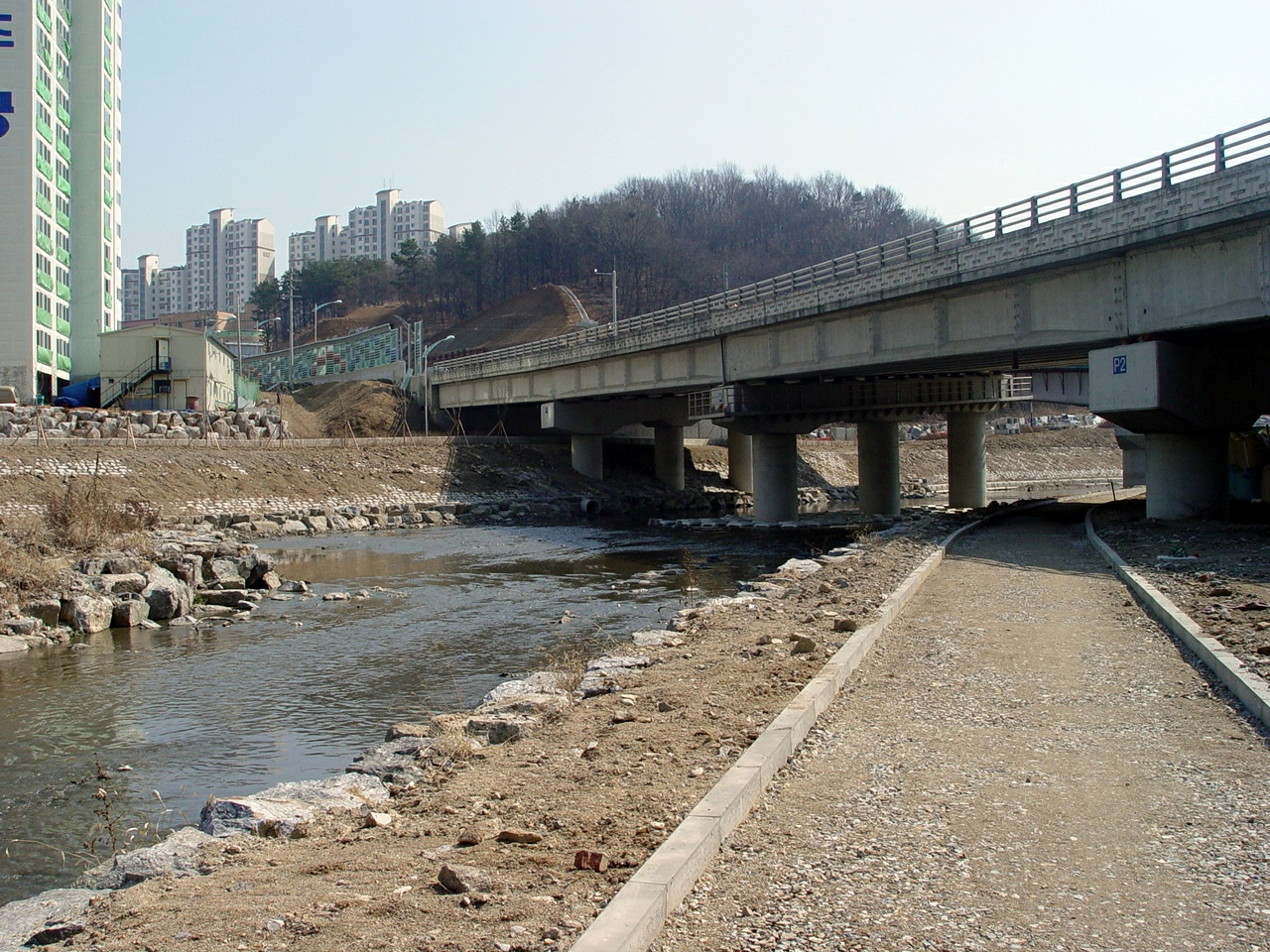
Under National Road 43 to Gwangju in Jukjeon, Yongin

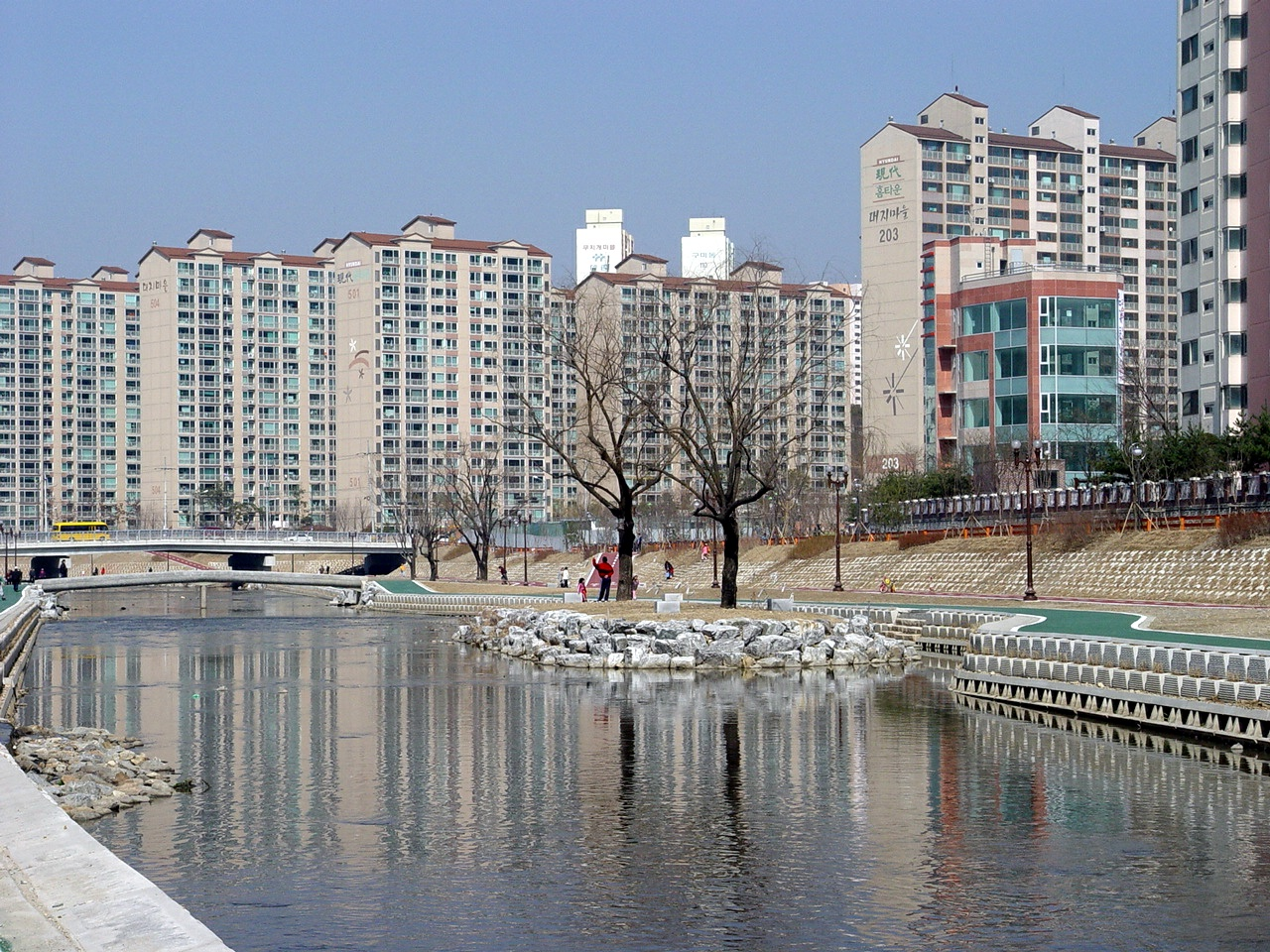
An artificial island in Jukjeon, Yongin

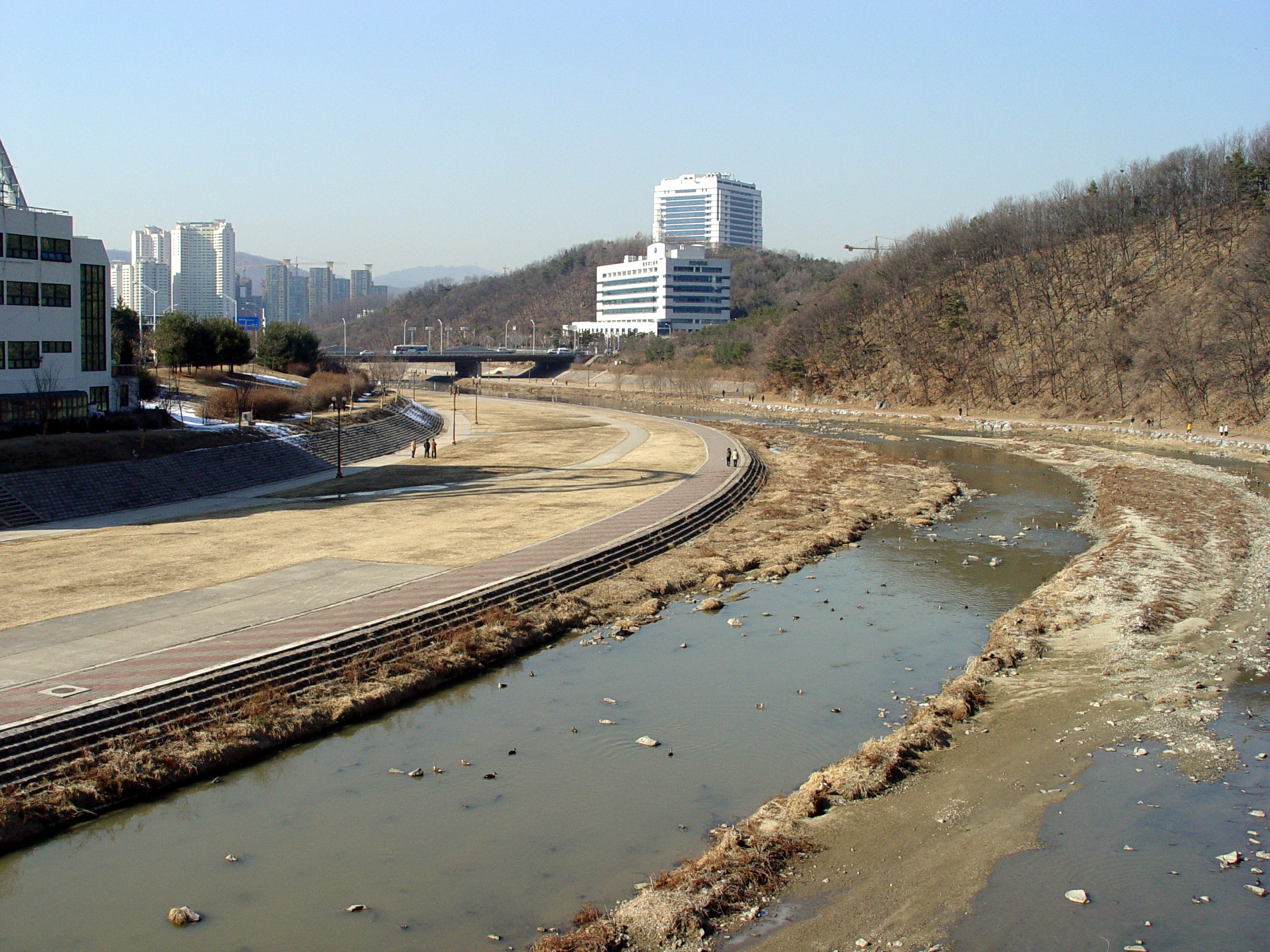
Looking north from Bundang's Seoul University Hospital

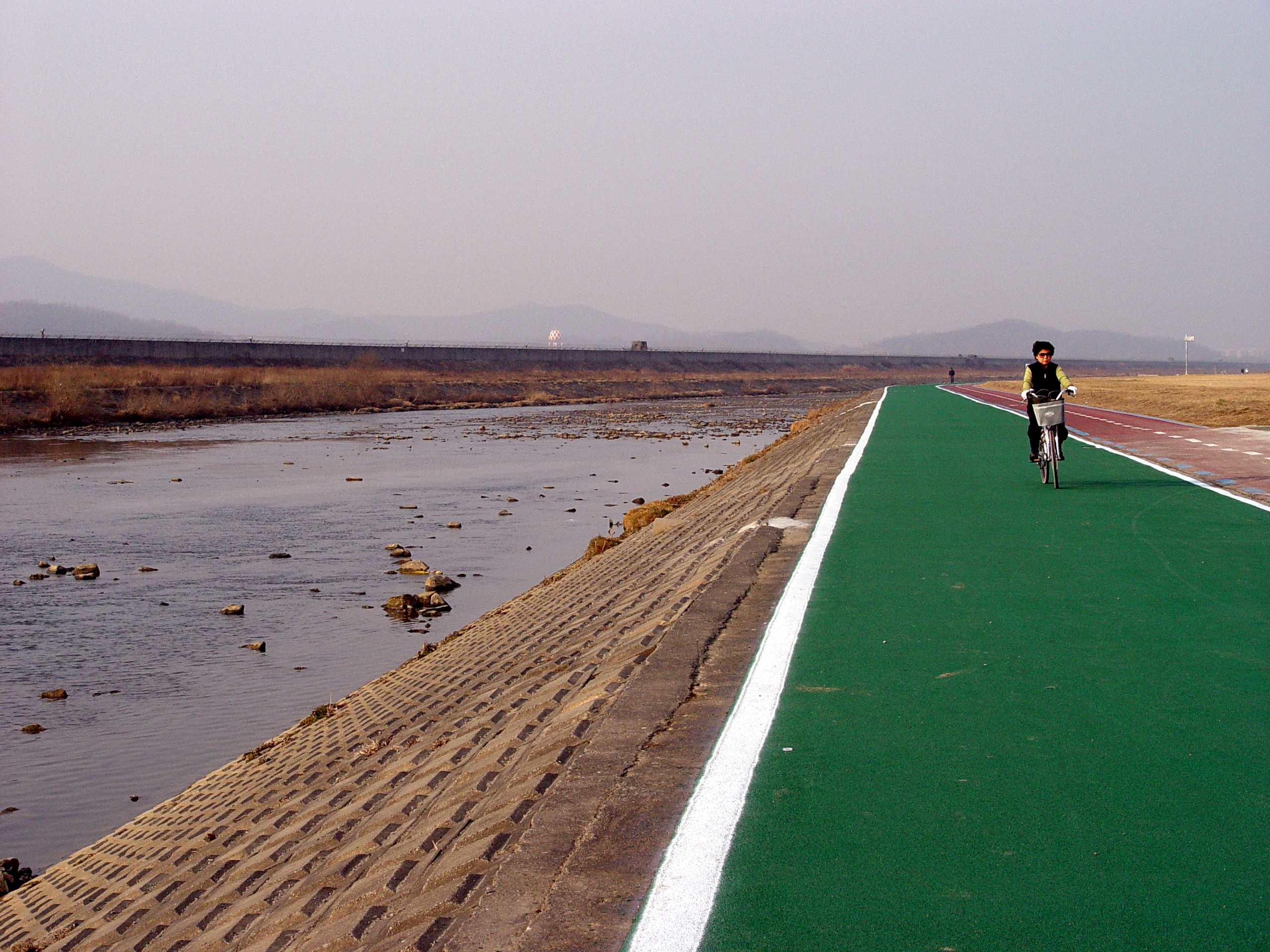
Looking north from near Taepyeong, Seongnam

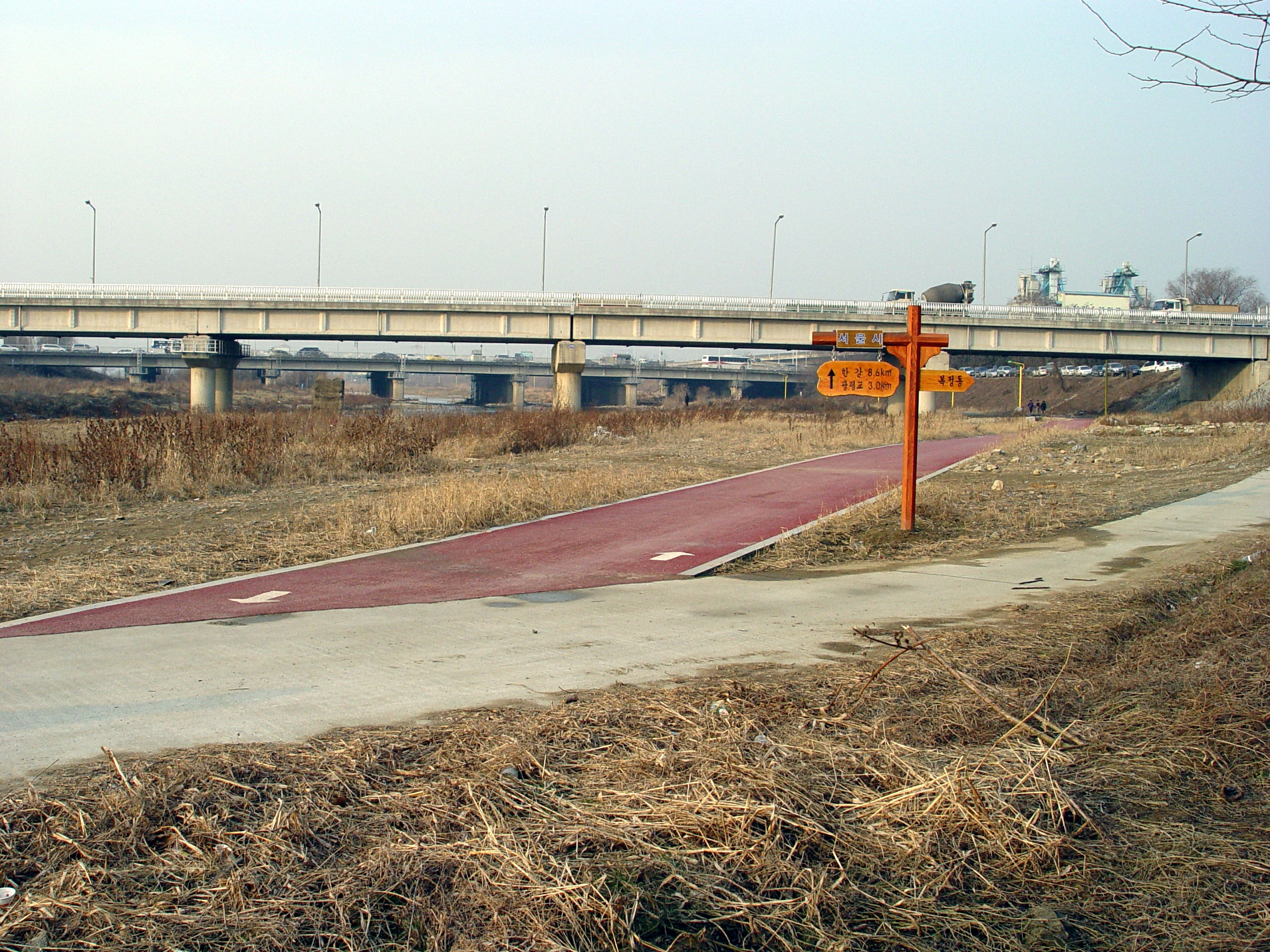
Entering Seoul from Seongnam

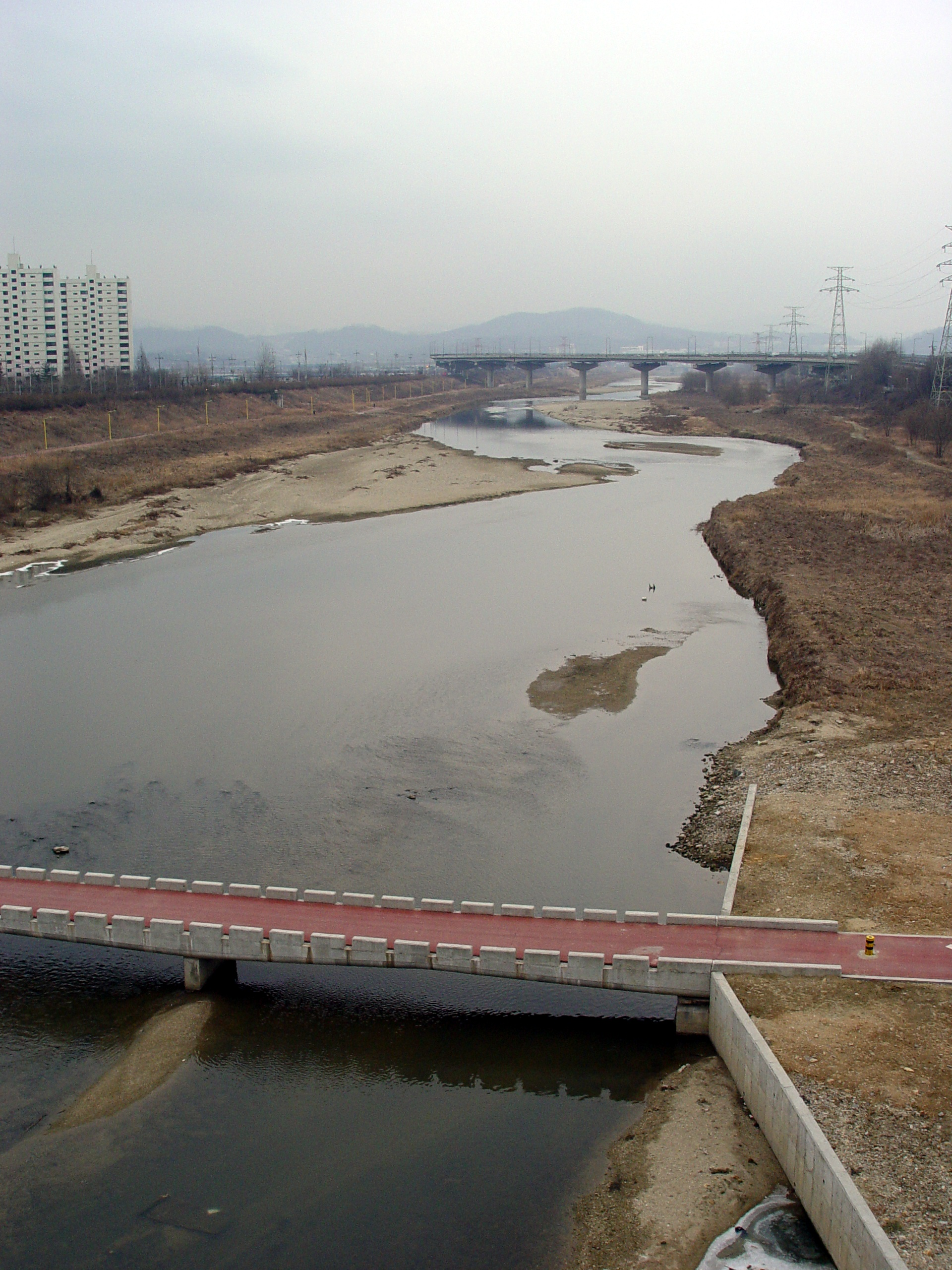
Looking south from the bridge near Suseo, Seoul

== See also ==
- Rivers of Korea
- Geography of South Korea
