= Blockchain Labs =

South Korean software company

- Industry: software, blockchain technology
- Founded: 2013
- Headquarters: Seoul, Korea

Blockchain Labs is a software company headquartered in Seoul, South Korea, specializing in blockchain technology. It was established in 2013 in San Francisco, California. The company is known for COOV, a digital certificate verification system it developed for COVID-19 vaccinations, officially adopted by the Korea Disease Control and Prevention Agency.

== History ==
Blockchain Labs was established in 2013 in San Francisco, California. In 2018, the company engineered InfraBlockchain, a public cryptocurrency-free blockchain, allowing the technology to be utilized in practical applications.

In August 2020, Blockchain Labs developed COOV (corona overcome), a blockchain-based vaccine pass used by 43 million Korean citizens based a public cryptocurrency-free blockchain. Vaccination verification through the COOV app is also recognized by the European Union.

The company provided its blockchain-based decentralized identity (DID) technology to the Korea Disease Control and Prevention Agency (KDCA) for data protection, after which COOV launched in April 2021. The app was downloaded by two million people in June 2021 alone. In 2022, Blockchain Labs launched the blockchain-based messaging app BlockChat.

The company's key products include COOV, (a digital certificate verification system that uses InfraBlockchain technology to authenticate data without creating an traceable record, InfraBlockchain (a public blockchain without any cryptocurrency) and BlockChat (a decentralized messenger).

== Literature ==
- Freedom and Social Inclusion in a Connected World (Springer International Publishing, 2022, ISBN 9783031194290)
- Sou Hee Yang, The Implications of Using Digital Technologies in the Management of COVID-19: Comparative Study of Japan and South Korea (2023, Journal of Medical Internet Research, doi:10.2196/45705)
