= Osong Public Health and Research Perspectives =

South Korean academic journal

- Discipline: Public Health
- Language: English

Publication details
- History: 2010–present
- Publisher: Korea Disease Control and Prevention Agency (South Korea)
- Frequency: Bimonthly
- Open access: Yes
- License: CC BY-NC-ND 4.0

Standard abbreviations
- ISO 4: Osong Public Health Res. Perspect.

Indexing
- ISSN: 2210-9099 (print); 2233-6052 (web)

Links
- Journal homepage

Osong Public Health and Research Perspectives (PHRP) is a peer-reviewed open access journal published bimonthly. It is published by the Korea Disease Control and Prevention Agency (KDCA). PHRP covers articles mostly in the areas of public health, putting emphasis on emerging infectious disease, vaccinology, zoonotic disease, intractable and rare diseases, etc. The journal is indexed by ESCI, Pubmed Central, Scopus, DOAJ and KCI.

== History ==
Osong Public Health and Research Perspectives was found in 2010 by Korea Centers for Disease Control and Prevention (currently Korea Disease Control and Prevention Agency).

== Abstracting and indexing ==
The journal is currently indexed in Pubmed Central, Scopus, DOAJ KCI, and ESCI.
