= Pungdeokcheon =

Tributary of the Tancheon river in Korean

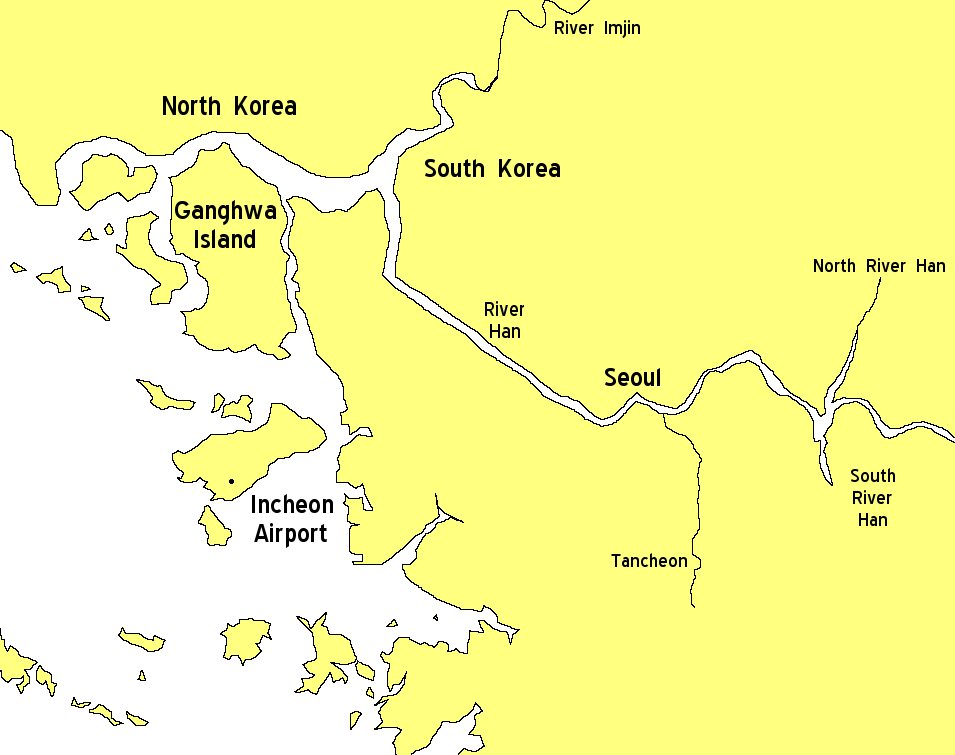

Korean name
- Hangul: 풍덕천
- Hanja: 豊德川
- RR: Pungdeokcheon
- MR: P'ungdŏkch'ŏn

The Pungdeokcheon, a tributary of the Tancheon, is a stream in Suji District, Yongin, Gyeonggi Province, South Korea. It joins the Tancheon from the west in Jukjeon.

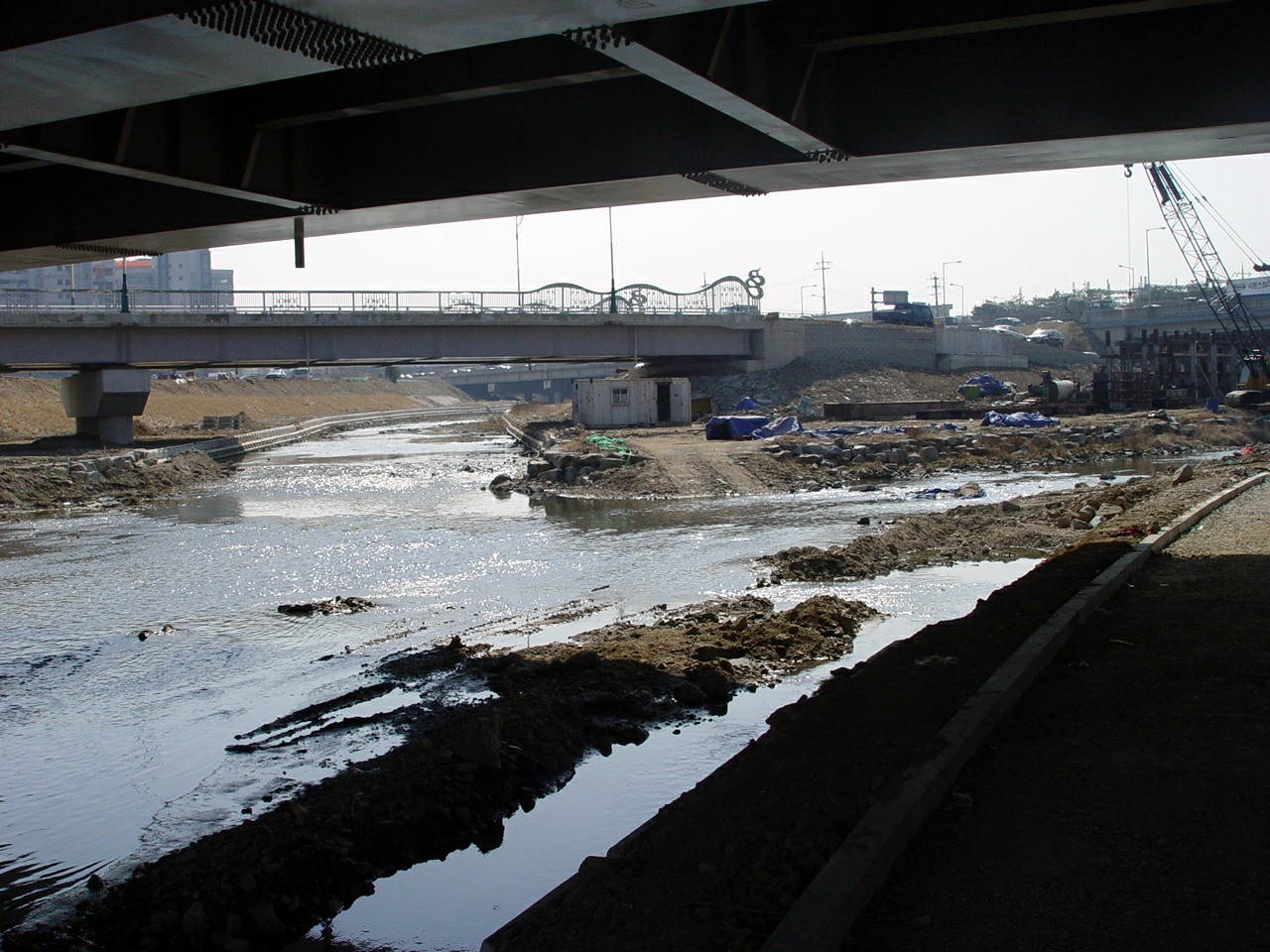
The Pungdeokcheon joins the Tancheon from the south-west (right of photo) in Jukjeon, Yongin.

== See also ==
- Rivers of Korea
- Geography of South Korea
