= Seegene =

Korean biotechnology company

Seegene Inc.
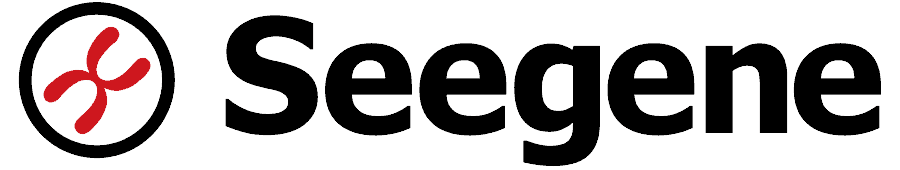
- Native name: ㈜씨젠
- Type: Public
- Traded as: KRX: 096530
- Industry: Laboratory equipment, biotechnology, healthcare
- Founded: 2000
- Key people: Dr. Chun Jong-Yoon (CEO), Lee Ho (President), Kim Bum-Joon (Vice President)
- Revenue: ▲US$957 million (2020)
- Number of employees: 793
- Website: www.seegene.com

Seegene, Inc is a Korean manufacturer of in vitro diagnostic (IVD) products, particularly molecular diagnostics. Its portfolio includes a range of assays and screening products for sepsis, respiratory diseases such as influenza and respiratory syncytial virus, as well as sexually transmitted infections (STIs). It was founded in 2000. In early 2020, it began developing and distributing a range of tests for SARS-CoV-2, the virus that causes COVID-19.

Along with its headquarters in Seoul, South Korea, the company has subsidiaries in the U.S., Canada, Germany, Italy, Mexico, Brazil, and the Middle East.

In September 2010, Seegene undertook a $16.6 million initial public offering to list on KOSDAQ, a trading board of Korea Exchange (KRX).

== Products ==
Seegene's primary product focus is multiplex diagnostic assays, which allow for the detection and quantification of multiple pathogens from a single sample. Seegene's assays are developed using its proprietary Dual Priming Oligonucleotide (DPO), Tagging Oligonucleotide Cleavage and Extension (TOCE), and Multiple Detection Temperatures (MuDT) technology platforms. Additional technologies include the GeneFishing discovery platform for differentially expressed genes (DEG), which detects differences in gene expression between two or more samples, as well as DNA Walking Technology, a platform permitting the identification of unknown sequences of DNA situated upstream or downstream of known sequences.

== The COVID-19 pandemic ==
Seegene moved quickly in January 2020 to begin developing a diagnostic for what would later be dubbed COVID-19, leveraging its proprietary artificial intelligence technology and SARS-CoV-2 genetic details that had been released online. The company produced its first real-time polymerase chain reaction (real-time PCR) assay to test for the novel coronavirus on February 3, 2020. The test, known as the Allplex 2019-nCoV Assay, identifies three different target genes – the E, RdRP, and N genes – in one reaction tube. This allows for accurate and high-volume testing when paired with automated instruments. Evaluation studies have determined that the analytical sensitivity of the Allplex 2019-nCoV Assay to detect SARS-CoV-2 exceeds 96% when compared to the US CDC protocol.

On February 12, 2020, the Ministry of Food and Drug Safety (MFDS) granted Seegene emergency use authorization for the Allplex 2019-nCoV Assay. The authorization came just days before the COVID-19 pandemic in South Korea began accelerating, centered around the southeastern city of Daegu.

Seegene began manufacturing and distributing up to 100,000 tests per day, cutting back production on 60 other tests to channel resources towards COVID-19. By April 2020, when the U.S. FDA granted emergency use authorization for the assay, the company had sold more than 10 million of the tests in more than 60 countries. Seegene was one of the top-performing Korean companies in 2020, registering profit growth of more than 1,000% year-over-year in the third quarter.

In early 2021, Seegene announced it had developed a first-of-its-kind COVID-19 variant test, the Allplex SARS-CoV-2 Variants I Assay, capable of screening for COVID-19 infection and identifying multiple mutant variations in a single reaction. The company scaled its production to 300,000 variant diagnostic test kits per month, enough to test 30 million people. The tests were subsequently shipped to approximately 20 countries around the world.

== Controversy ==
In February 2021, Seegene was disciplined by Korea's Securities and Futures Commission for accounting errors and deficiencies taking place in the company's early years of operation. According to a company statement, Seegene acknowledged and reconciled those issues in 2019, overhauling its accounting and management practices.
