= William Schaffner (professor) =

American infectious disease physician

- Born: 1937 (age 88–89)
- Education: Yale University, Cornell University Medical College
- Awards: National Vaccine Program Office UpShot Award (2017)
- Scientific career
- Fields: Infectious disease
- Institutions: Vanderbilt University School of Medicine

William Schaffner (born 1937) is an American physician and researcher who specializes in infectious diseases. He is the Professor of Preventive Medicine in the Department of Health Policy as well as the Professor of Medicine in the Division of Infectious Diseases at the Vanderbilt University School of Medicine. He is the current medical director of the National Foundation for Infectious Diseases, of which he previously served as president.
