= Korea Disease Control and Prevention Agency =

South Korean government public health agency

- 질병관리청

Agency overview
- Formed: December 18, 2003; September 12, 2020 (expanded)
- Preceding agencies: Central Health Centre (1949–1960); National Institute of Health (1960–1967); National Institute of Public Health Training (1967–1981); National Institute of Health (1981–2003); Korea Centers for Disease Control and Prevention (2003–2020)
- Jurisdiction: Government of South Korea
- Headquarters: 187, Osongsaengmyeong 2-ro, Osong-eup, Heungdeok-gu, Cheongju, North Chungcheong Province, South Korea
- Employees: 1,476
- Agency executives: Jee Young-mi, Commissioner of Korea Disease Control and Prevention; Choi Jong-kyun, Vice Commissioner
- Parent department: Ministry of Health and Welfare
- Child agencies: Korea National Institute of Health (KNIH); Regional Centers for Disease Control and Prevention; National Quarantine Station
- Website: kdca.go.kr

Korean name
- Hangul: 질병관리청
- Hanja: 疾病管理廳
- RR: Jilbyeong gwallicheong
- MR: Chilbyŏng kwallich'ŏng

Former name
- Hangul: 질병관리본부
- Hanja: 疾病管理本部
- RR: Jilbyeong gwalli bonbu
- MR: Chilbyŏng kwalli ponbu

Korea Disease Control and Prevention Agency (KDCA; Korean: 질병관리청), formerly Korea Centers for Disease Control and Prevention (KCDC, 질병관리본부), is an organization under the South Korean Ministry of Welfare and Health that is responsible for the advancement of public health by managing prevention, survey, quarantine, trial, and research on infectious diseases, chronic and rare illnesses and injuries. It was founded in December 2003 and is located in Osong Health Technology Administration Complex in Cheongju. The organization is led by the vice-ministerial-level Commissioner of KDCA.

== History ==
- July 14, 1949: Central Health Centre was created under Ministry of Health
- January 1, 1960: renamed to Central Health Institute
- August 12, 1960: renamed to National Institute of Health
- December 17, 1963: merged with National Chemical Laboratories, National Laboratory of Herb Medicine and National Institute of Public Health Training
- February 1, 1967: renamed to National Institute of Public Health Training
- November 1981: renamed to National Institute of Health
- December 23, 1994: re-organised under Ministry of Health and Welfare
- December 18, 2003: changed to Korea Centers for Disease Control and Prevention (KCDC)
- December 2010: moved its headquarters to Osong
- April 2012: National Central Human Body Resource Bank was founded under KNIH of KCDC
- September 12, 2020: restructured into an expanded Korea Disease Control and Prevention Agency (KDCA) under the Ministry with more autonomy and resources

Its history is in line with the major infectious disease outbreaks in South Korea. After the SARS outbreak in 2003, the then-National Institute of Health was restructured to the American CDC-like KCDC. After the MERS outbreak in 2015, the head of KCDC was promoted to vice-ministerial level.

Given the 2020 general election where all major parties promised raising KCDC's autonomy by lifting its status to "administration/agency (청; 廳)" and lessons learned from the COVID-19 outbreak, there have been rumors that there will be changes to the organisation in the near future. In his special public address to mark his third year in office on 10 May 2020, President Moon Jae-in announced that he will seek revision of legislation to raise the status of the KCDC to the administration.

On 12 September 2020, the KCDC expanded to a Korea Disease Control and Prevention Agency (KDCA) with more autonomy and resources - most notably 42% increase in its staff number and its Center for Infectious Disease Research of KNIH becoming a research institute of KNIH. Director of KCDC, Jeong Eun-kyeong, will continue lead the organisation as its first Commissioner.

== Organization ==
=== Commissioner of KDCA ===
- Spokesperson
- Emergency Operations Center (EOC)
- Director General for Public Health Emergency Preparedness
  - Director for Emergency Response Capacity Development
  - Director for Risk Assessment
  - Director for Epidemiological Investigation Analysis
  - Director for Public Health Emergency Response Research

Vice Commissioner of KDCA

- Director for Audit and Inspection
- Director General for Planning and Coordination
  - Director for Planning and Finance
  - Director for Organizational and Legal Affairs
  - Director for International Affairs
  - Director for Information and Statistics
- Division of General Affairs
- Bureau of Infectious Disease Policy
  - Division of Infectious Disease Policy Coordination
  - Division of Infectious Disease Control
  - Division of Zoonotic and Vector Borne Disease Control
  - Division of Tuberculosis Prevention and Control
  - Division of HIV/AIDS Prevention and Control
- Bureau of Infectious Disease Emergency Preparedness and Response
  - Division of Emergency Response
  - Division of Quarantine Policy
  - Division of Healthcare Response Facility Management
  - Division of Medical Stockpile Management
  - Division of Emerging Infectious Diseases
- Bureau of Infectious Disease Diagnosis Control
  - Division of Laboratory Diagnosis Management
  - Division of Bacterial Diseases
  - Division of Viral Diseases
  - Division of Vectors and Parasitic Diseases
  - Division of High-Risk Pathogens
  - Division of Emerging Infectious Diseases
- Bureau of Healthcare Safety and Immunization
  - Division of Immunization
  - Division of Healthcare Associated Infection Control
  - Division of Anti.microbial Resistance Control
  - Division of Vaccine Supply
  - Division of Medical Radiation
  - Division of Biosafety Evaluation and Control
- Bureau of Chronic Disease Prevention and Control
  - Division of Chronic Disease Control
  - Division of Chronic Disease Prevention
  - Division of Rare Disease Management
  - Division of Health and Nutrition Survey and Analysis
  - Director General for Health Hazard Response
    - Division of Health Hazard Response
    - Division of Injury Prevention and Control
    - Division of Climate Change and Health Protection

=== Child agencies ===
- National Research Institute of Health/Korea National Institute of Health (KNIH, 국립보건연구원)
  - National Infectious Disease Research Institute (국립감염병연구소)
- Regional Centers for Disease Control and Prevention (권역별 질병대응센터)
- National Quarantine Station (국립검역소)
  - Incheon Airport Quarantine
  - Gunsan Quarantine
  - Ulsan Quarantine
  - Busan Quarantine
  - Mokpo Quarantine
  - Gimhae Quarantine
  - Incheon Quarantine
  - Yeosu Quarantine
  - Pohang Quarantine
  - Masan Quarantine
  - Tongyeong Quarantine
  - Donghae Quarantine
  - Jeju Quarantine
- Mokpo National Tuberculosis Hospital
- Masan National Tuberculosis Hospital

== Leadership ==
=== Director of KCDC ===
- Kim Moon-sik (2003–2004)
- Oh Dae-gyu (2004–2007)
- Lee Jong-gu (2007–2011)
- Jeon Byeong-yul (2011–2013)
- Yang Byeong-guk (2013–2016)
- Jeong Gi-seok (2016–2017)
- Jeong Eun-kyeong (2017–2020)

=== Commissioner of KDCA ===
- Jeong Eun-kyeong (2020–2022)
- Peck Kyong-ran (2022–present)

== Publications ==
- Osong Public Health and Research Perspectives

== See also ==
- 2009 swine flu pandemic
- 2015 Middle East respiratory syndrome outbreak in South Korea
- COVID-19 pandemic in South Korea
- List of national public health agencies
- Centers for Disease Control and Prevention (CDC), USA
- Chinese Center for Disease Control and Prevention (CCDC), China
