= Seoul National University Bundang Hospital =

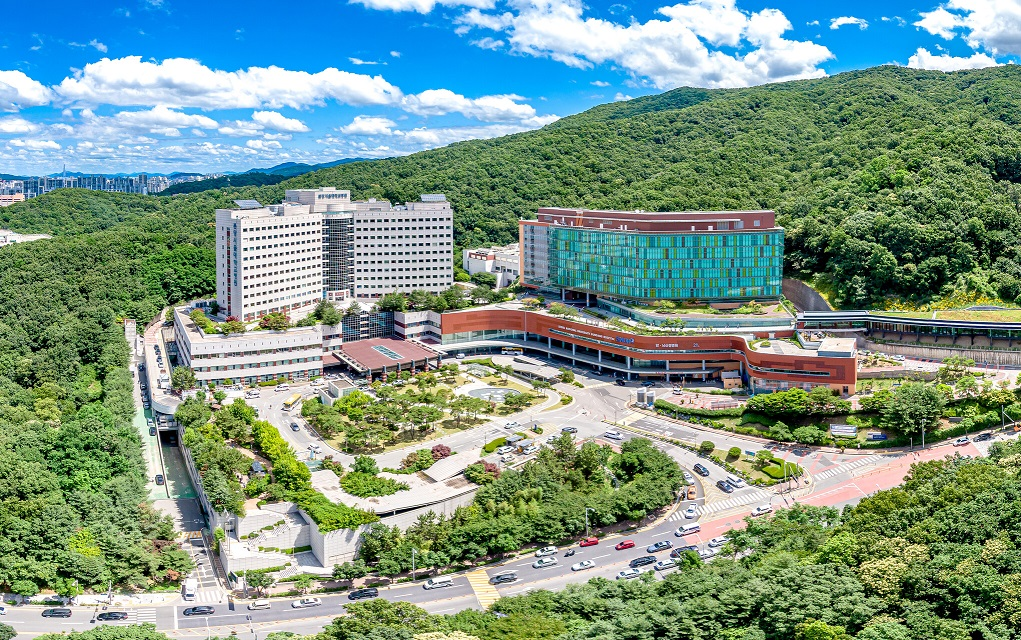

Geography
- Location: Gumi-dong, Bundang, Seongnam, Gyeonggi Province, South Korea

Organisation
- Type: General
- Affiliated university: Seoul National University

Services
- Beds: 1,424

History
- Opened: May 10, 2003

Links
- Website: www.snubh.org (Korean) www.snubh.org/dh/en/ (English)
- Lists: Hospitals in South Korea

Seoul National University Bundang Hospital (Korean: 분당서울대학교병원) is located in Gumi-dong, Bundang, Seongnam, Gyeonggi Province, South Korea. It is affiliated with Seoul National University College of Medicine and began clinical operations on May 10, 2003.

It is the largest hospital in Gyeonggi Province—the most populous province in South Korea—and plays a critical role in providing essential, emergency, and intensive care services.

As of 2024, the hospital has 1,424 licensed beds according to the Health Insurance Review and Assessment Service.

In 2025, Newsweek ranked Seoul National University Bundang Hospital among the World's Best Hospitals, placing it within the global top 100 and 5th nationally in South Korea.

== Clinical departments and specialized centers ==
SNUBH operates more than 36 clinical departments 12 specialized centers, including:

- Comprehensive Cancer Center
- Cardiovascular Center
- Neuroscience Center
- Respiratory Center
- Joint Disease and Reconstruction Center
- Spine Center
- Digestive Disease Center
- Geriatric Medicine Center
- Dizziness Center
- Pain Center
- Health Promotion Center
- International Healthcare Center

The hospital also operates a full-scale Emergency Medical Center and acts as a base hospital for emergency and trauma care in the region.

== Digital healthcare ==
SNUBH was one of the first hospitals in South Korea to implement a fully paperless electronic medical record. The hospital has continued to develop digital health infrastructure and innovation in clinical informatics.

Its in-house electronic medical record platform, BESTCare, became the first system outside of the United States to receive Healthcare Information and Management Systems Society EMRAM Stage 7 certification in 2010, covering regions including Europe and Asia. SNUBH has since been revalidated for the certification in 2016, 2019, and 2024, becoming the first hospital in Asia to receive Stage 7 certification four times.

== Medical research infrastructure ==
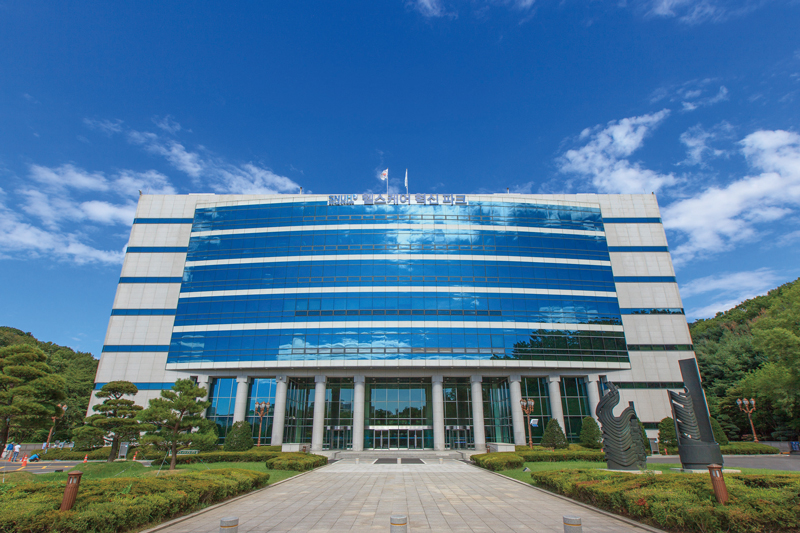
SNUBH Healthcare Innovation Park

In 2016, SNUBH opened the Healthcare Innovation Park, a large-scale research complex designed to promote interdisciplinary collaboration across medical, academic, industrial, and governmental sectors. Inspired by models such as the Boston biomedical cluster, the park was established to serve as a hub for next-generation medical research and healthcare technology development.

Located adjacent to the main hospital, the complex provides space for biomedical startups and research groups to operate within a hospital ecosystem. The campus covers a total area of 45,728 square meters, making it one of the largest dedicated medical research complexes in South Korea.

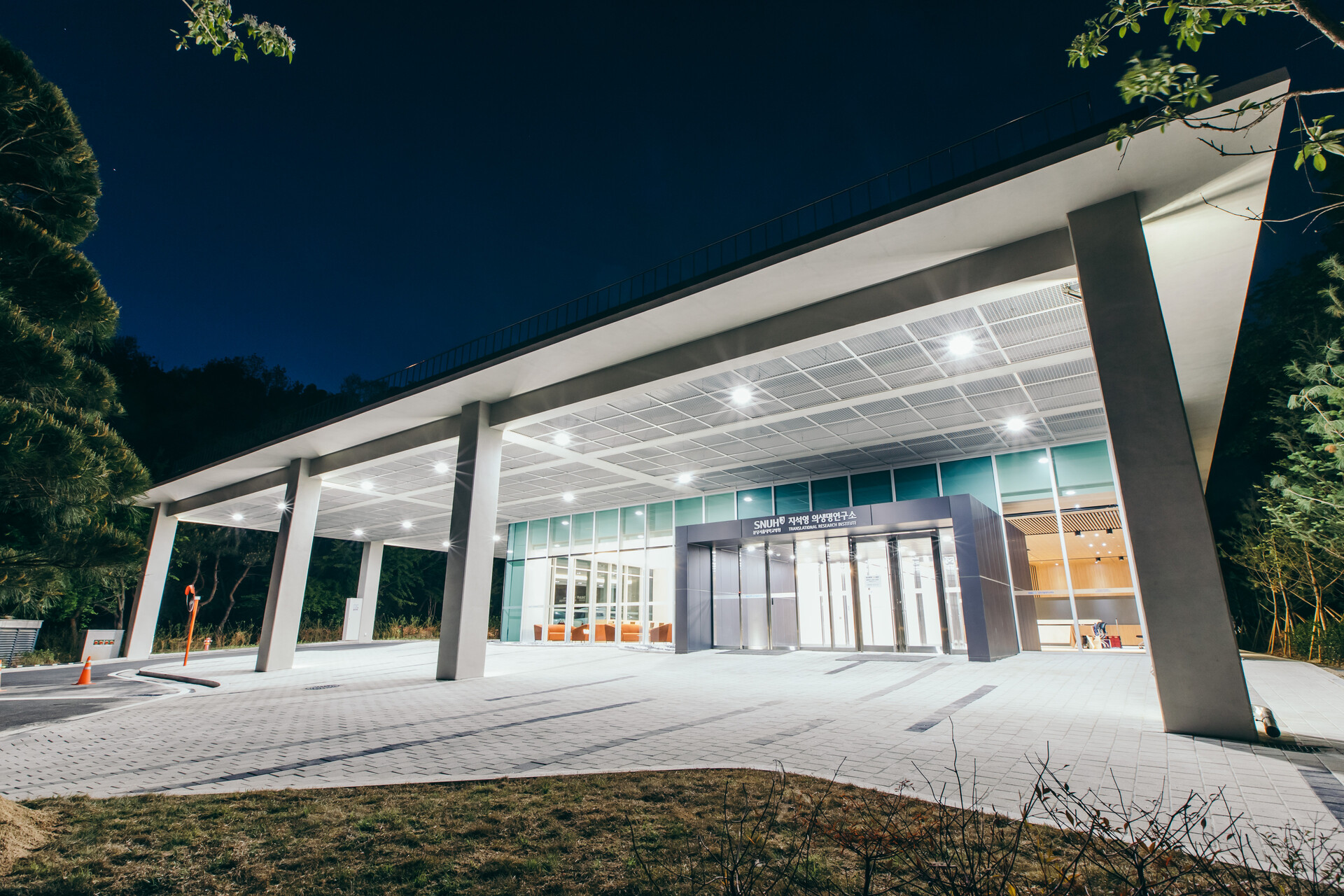

In 2019, SNUBH established the Ji Seok-Young Biomedical Research Institute, which includes preclinical research facilities such as animal testing laboratories. This enables the hospital to support the entire cycle of medical innovation—from idea generation and preclinical testing to clinical trials and commercialization.

In 2025, SNUBH was officially designated as a "research-centered hospital" by the Ministry of Health and Welfare of South Korea, in recognition of its leadership in integrating clinical services with translational research and industry partnerships.
