= 2024 in South Korea =

- Centuries: 20th; 21st
- Decades: 2000s; 2010s; 2020s; 2030s
- See also: Other events of 2024; Years in South Korea; Timeline of Korean history 2024 in North Korea

The following lists events in the year 2024 in South Korea.

== Incumbents ==
Office	Image	Name	Assumed office / Current length
President of the Republic of Korea		Yoon Suk Yeol (suspended since 14 December)	10 May 2022 (4 years ago)
President of the Republic of Korea		Han Duck-soo (acting from 14 December to 27 December; suspended since 27 December)	14 December 2024 (22 months ago)
President of the Republic of Korea		Choi Sang-mok (acting since 27 December)	27 December 2024 (22 months ago)
Speaker of the National Assembly		Kim Jin-pyo	4 July 2022 (4 years ago)
Speaker of the National Assembly		Woo Won-shik	5 June 2024 (2 years ago)
Chief Justice of the Supreme Court		Cho Hee-dae	8 December 2023 (2 years ago)
President of the Constitutional Court		Lee Jong-seok	30 November 2023 (2 years ago)
President of the Constitutional Court		Moon Hyungbae (Acting)	18 October 2024 (2 years ago)
Prime Minister of the Republic of Korea		Han Duck-soo (suspended since 27 December)	21 May 2022 (4 years ago)
Prime Minister of the Republic of Korea		Choi Sang-mok (acting since 27 December)	27 December 2024 (22 months ago)

== Events ==
=== January ===
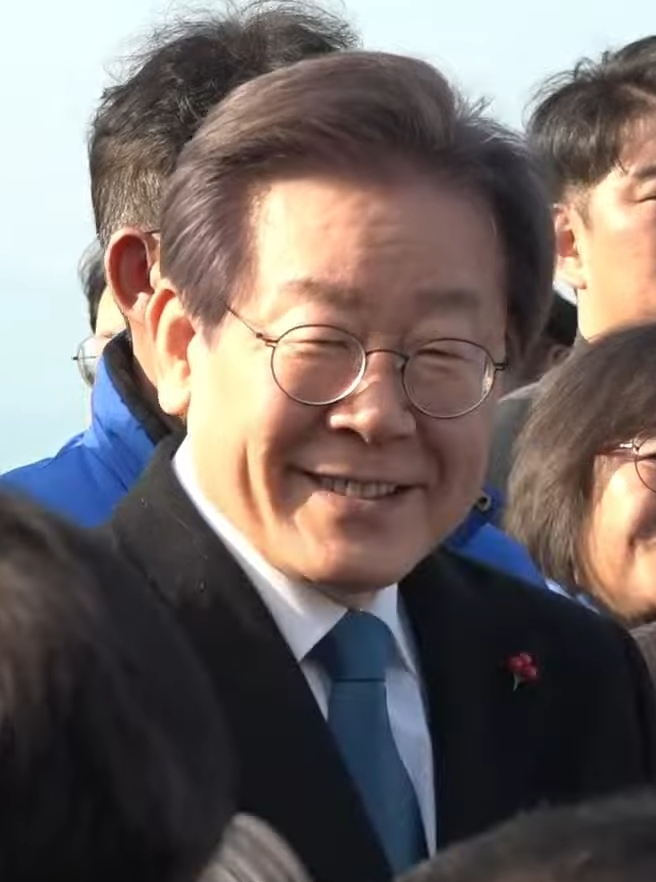
Lee speaking on 2 January 2024, shortly before the attack

- 2 January – Attempted assassination of Lee Jae-myung: Democratic Party of Korea leader Lee Jae-myung is stabbed in the neck while visiting Busan. Lee is taken to Pusan National University Hospital about 20 minutes after the attack, and the suspect is arrested at the scene.
- 5 January – North Korea fires 200 artillery shells near Yeonpyeong Island, prompting evacuations.
- 9 January – South Korea bans the breeding and slaughter of dogs for consumption, effective in 2027, with the government promising to fully support dog meat farmers, butchers and restaurant owners.
- 15 January – The government announces its decision to invest a total of 622 trillion won by 2047 to build a semiconductor mega cluster of Pyeongtaek, Icheon, Yongin, Hwaseong, Seongnam, and Suwon in the southern part of Gyeonggi Province. The plan also includes raising the self-sufficiency rate of key material, parts, and equipment supply chains to 50% by 2030, and policy support for companies.
- 19 January to 2 February – 2024 Winter Youth Olympics at Gangwon Province
- 23 January – More than 350 flights at Jeju International Airport are canceled due to heavy snow and strong winds.
- 25 January – People Power Party assemblywoman Bae Hyun-jin is attacked and hospitalized in Seoul.

=== February ===
- 14 February – Cuba and South Korea establish diplomatic relations after exchanging letters via their United Nations representatives.
- 16–25 February – 2024 World Team Table Tennis Championships at Busan
- 6 February – Ministry of Health and Welfare Cho Kyu-hong says that the number of medical students will increase by 2,000 from 2025, marking the first time since 1998 that the number of medical students will be expanded. The Korea Medical Association warns that it would go on a nationwide walkout if the government pushes for expanding the number of admissions to medical schools.

=== March ===
- 12 March –
  - 2024 South Korean medical crisis: The government begins suspending the medical licenses of thousands of resigning doctors due to growing concerns that the resignation is affecting medical services.
    - Over 10,000 doctors go on strike at 100 educational hospitals, leading to a number of delays in treatment.

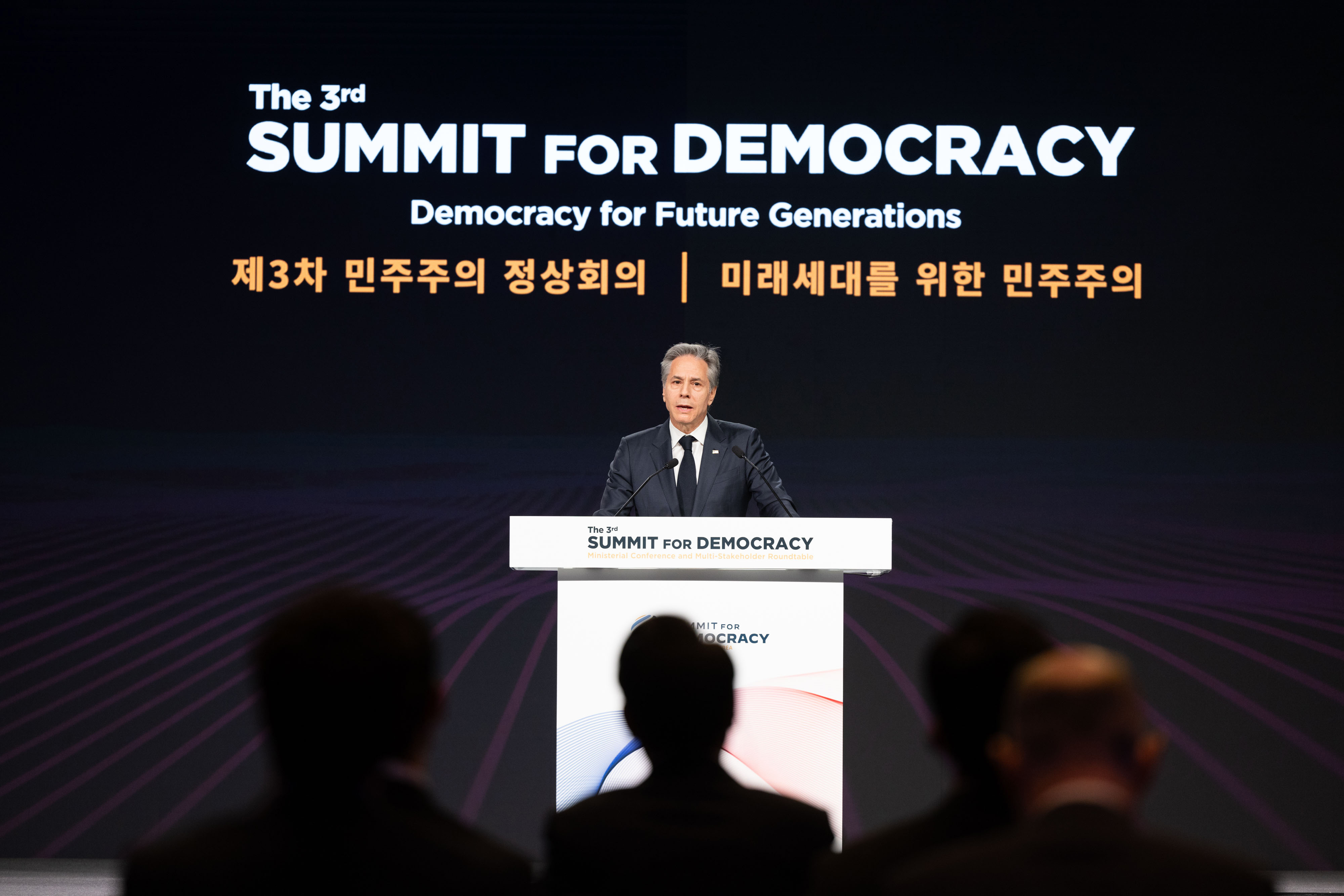
U.S. Secretary Antony J. Blinken delivers opening remarks at the Third Summit for Democracy in Seoul

- 18–20 March – South Korea hosts the Summit for Democracy 2024.
- 20 March – The South Korean-flagged tanker Keoyoung Sun capsizes off the coast of Yamaguchi Prefecture, Japan, during stormy weather. Nine crew members are found dead, while one person remains missing. Two people are rescued.

=== April ===
- 8 April – South Korea launches its second home-grown technology intelligence satellite mounted on a SpaceX Falcon 9 rocket from the Kennedy Space Center in the United States.
- 10 April – 2024 South Korean legislative election
  - The opposition, primarily consisting of the Democratic Party, its alliance and the Rebuilding Korea Party, increases their legislative majority in the National Assembly but falls short of the two-thirds supermajority needed to pass constitutional amendments or override the veto of President Yoon Suk Yeol.
- 11 April – Prime Minister Han Duck-soo, People Power Party leader Han Dong-hoon and several aides of President Yoon Suk-yeol resign from their positions, citing the losses incurred by the administration in the legislative elections.
- 12 April – The Bank of Korea's Monetary Policy Committee freezes the key interest rate at 3.5 percent for the 10th consecutive time.
- 15 April – The Supreme Court of Korea dismisses a lawsuit to annul the results of the 2022 gubernatorial election in Gyeonggi Province.
- 29 April – President Yoon Suk Yeol meets with Lee Jae-myung, the leader of the main opposition Democratic Party of Korea, for talks.

=== May ===
- 2 May – South Korea raises its terrorism alert level to the second highest level, citing strong chances of an attack from North Korea on its overseas diplomatic offices.
- 9 May – President Yoon holds a press conference in the Presidential Office to mark his second anniversary in office. Yoon acknowledgesthat the government's measures to solve various economic problems, including high prices, have fallen short of people's expectations and expresses his concern about the country's low birth rate. He also announces plans to establish a new ministry.
- 21–22 May – President Yoon, Group of Seven leaders, Singaporean Prime Minister Lawrence Wong and OECD and EU leaders attend the AI Seoul Summit that is also attended by Elon Musk, CEO of Tesla, and Samsung Electronics Chairman Lee Jae-yong, as well as representatives from OpenAI, Google, Microsoft, Meta and Naver.
- 22 May – President Yoon announces a ₩26 trillion (US$19 billion) support package for the country's semiconductor industry, which accounts for 18% of the country's total exports.
- 29 May – North Korea deploys 260 balloons carrying garbage and possible human waste over South Korea, which Pyongyang says is in retaliation for balloons sent into the North by anti-regime activists.

=== June ===
- 4–5 June – 2024 South Korea–Africa Summit: President Yoon and representatives from 48 African countries held a summit meeting in Ilsan, Gyeonggi-do.
- 4 June – The State Council of South Korea suspends the 2018 Panmunjom Declaration due to border tensions over balloons sent by North Korea.
- 5 June – The United States and South Korea participate in the first precision guided bombing drill in seven years over the Korean Peninsula.
- 6 June – A South Korean activists' group led by North Korean defector Park Sang-hak sends 200,000 anti-Pyongyang leaflets, U.S. bills, and USB sticks containing K-pop songs and South Korean dramas to North Korea with 10 balloons in retaliation to for the North's deployment of balloons carrying trash to South Korea.
- 7 June – Samsung Electronics experiences its first ever labor walkout following a dispute over pay and workers' bonuses.
- 9 June:
  - South Korea announces that it would resume loudspeaker broadcasts into North Korea for the first time since 2018 in retaliation for the latter's deployment of trash-filled balloons.
  - A group of North Korean soldiers enter the South Korean side of the DMZ, prompting warning shots from South Korean forces that force them to retreat.
- 12 June – A magnitude 4.3 earthquake strikes North Jeolla Province, damaging at least 285 structures.
- 18 June:
  - A group of North Korean soldiers enter the South Korean side of the central section of the DMZ, prompting warning shots from South Korean forces that force them to retreat.
  - President Yoon Suk Yeol declares a 'demographic national emergency'.
- 20 June – A group of North Korean soldiers enter the South Korean side of the DMZ, prompting warning shots from South Korean forces that force them to retreat.

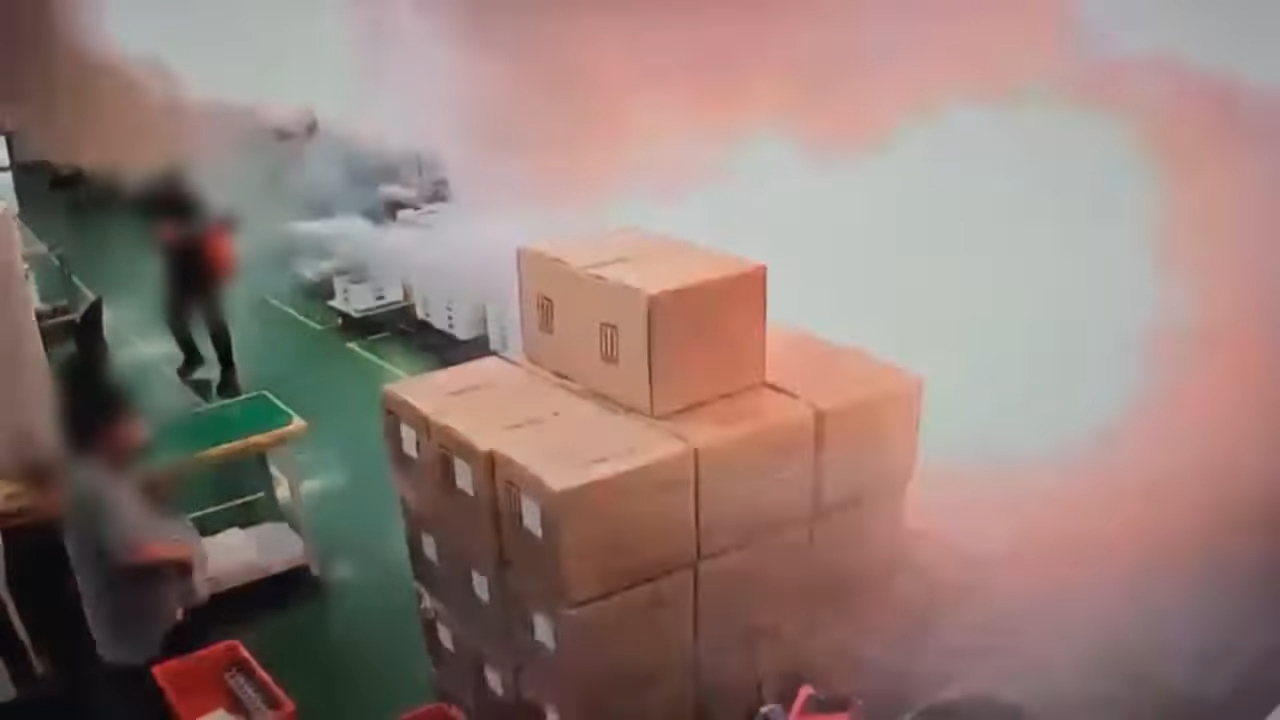
CCTV footage of the battery explosion in Hwaseong, Gyeonggi Province

- 24 June – Hwaseong battery factory fire: A fire at a factory producing lithium batteries in Hwaseong, Gyeonggi, kills 23 people.

=== July ===
- 1 July – Nine pedestrians are killed and four others are injured after being hit by a car near Seoul City Hall.
- 3–6 July – More than 1,000 people fall ill in an outbreak of norovirus in Namwon that is blamed on kimchi.
- 5 July – The suspect in the attempted assassination of Lee Jae-myung is convicted and sentenced by the Busan District Court to 15 years' imprisonment.
- 8 July–ongoing – Members of the National Samsung Electronics Union go on strike following a dispute over pay and workers' bonuses. On 10 July, the union extends the strike indefinitely.
- 8 July – The government withdraws its plan to suspend the licences of junior doctors participating in the ongoing medical crisis.
- 16 July – The National Intelligence Service announces the defection of North Korean diplomat Ri Il Kyu and his family from his posting in Cuba in November 2023.
- 17 July
  - Korea Hydro & Nuclear Power is selected as the preferred bidder to build two reactors at the Dukovany Nuclear Power Station in Czech Republic.
  - A former official of the Central Intelligence Agency and the United States National Security Council is charged by the US Department of Justice with spying for the South Korean National Intelligence Service.
- 18 July – The Supreme Court of Korea orders the National Health Insurance Service to extend spousal insurance coverage to LGBT couples following a lawsuit by a gay couple alleging discrimination.
- 23 July – Kim Beom-soo, the head of Kakao, is arrested in Seoul on charges of manipulating the stock prices of K-pop firm SM Entertainment to ensure his takeover of the latter.
- 24 July – A balloon from North Korea carrying rubbish lands on the Presidential Residence in Yongsan, Seoul.
- July 26–August 11 – South Korea at the 2024 Summer Olympics: The South Korean Olympic delegation wins 13 gold, nine silver, and ten bronze medals and places 8th out of 84 countries competing at the 2024 Summer Olympics in Paris.
- 30 July – A civilian employee of the Defense Counterintelligence Command is arrested on charges of leaking military secrets to a Chinese national.

=== August ===
- 2 August – The National Assembly votes 186-1 to impeach Korea Communications Commission chair Lee Jin-sook for unfairly running the KCC's standing committee and passing decisions despite three of the committee's five positions being vacant.
- 5 August – The benchmark KOSPI records its highest fall on record amid concerns over an economic slowdown in the United States.
- 20 August – A North Korean soldier defects to South Korea by crossing through a section of the DMZ in Goseong County, Gangwon Province.
- 22 August
  - The Bank of Korea freezes its benchmark interest rate at 3.5 percent, with Governor Rhee Chang-yong saying its board had opened the door to a potential rate cut within three months. The presidential office calls the decision "disappointing from the perspective of boosting domestic command."
  - At least seven people are killed and 12 others are injured in a fire at a hotel in Bucheon.
- 28 August – The Korea AeroSpace Administration announces its 2025 budget, amounting to ₩964.9 billion (US$ 725.5 million), a 27% increase from the previous year.
- 29 August –
  - The Suwon District Court arrests Aricell CEO Park Soon-kwan over his role in the Hwaseong battery factory fire that killed 23 people in June.
  - The Constitutional Court of Korea orders the government to revise the country's laws on dealing with climate change following a class suit by environmental campaigners and youth.

=== September ===
- 2 September –
  - The National Police Agency announces an investigation into the messaging app Telegram for abetting and hosting chat rooms that distribute deepfake pornography, including of children.
  - President Yoon boycotts the opening of the inaugural session of the new National Assembly, making him the first South Korean leader not to attend the ceremony since the restoration of democracy in 1988.
- 4 September – President Yoon and New Zealand Prime Minister Christopher Luxon hold a summit in Seoul. Both leaders pledged to strengthen bilateral relations in various fields including trade, investment, security and technology, and to cooperate on regional and international issues, and express concerns about the international situation, including security in the South China Sea, the Taiwan Strait and the Russian invasion of Ukraine.
- 6 September – Japanese Prime Minister Fumio Kishida makes his last visit to South Korea before leaving office. President Yoon and Kishida emphasize that it is very important to maintain the momentum of cooperation and exchange between the two countries.
- 30 September –
  - The Seoul Western District Court convicts three police officers, including the former head of Yongsan police station Lee Im-jae, of negligence over their handling of the Seoul Halloween crowd crush in 2022 and sentences them to up to three years imprisonment.
  - Slovak Prime Minister Robert Fico makes an official visit to South Korea and holds a summit with President Yoon, resulting in a joint statement to establish a strategic partnership in the areas of security, defense, economy, trade, energy, and technology.

=== October ===
- 2 October –
  - A defector from North Korea is arrested near Paju after trying to return to North Korea using a stolen bus which crashes into a barricade at the Unification Bridge in the DMZ.
  - As the conflict between Israel and Iran intensifies, President Yoon holds an emergency meeting with senior government officials and orders the immediate dispatch of military transport planes to repatriate South Koreans. They also discuss measures to minimize the impact on the economy and energy supplies.
- 10 October – Han Kang is awarded the Nobel Prize for Literature in recognition for "her intense poetic prose that confronts historical traumas and exposes the fragility of human life".
- 11 October – North Korea accuses South Korea of sending drones carrying propaganda leaflets over Pyongyang on three occasions since 3 October. South Korean officials deny the claims.
- 15 October – The Changwon District Court rules that misogyny is a hate crime in the case of a man convicted of physically assaulting a woman over her short hair.
- 17 October –
  - North Korea revises its constitution to formally designate South Korea as a "hostile" state.
  - Kim Kwang-ho, the former head of the Seoul Metropolitan Police Agency, is acquitted of negligence over the Seoul Halloween crowd crush in 2022, citing insufficient evidence.
- 24 October – A balloon from North Korea carrying rubbish lands on the Presidential Residence in Yongsan, Seoul.

=== November ===
- 5 November – The Personal Information Protection Commission imposes a fine of 21.6 billion won ($15 million) on Meta Platforms for illegally collecting sensitive information from around 980,000 Facebook users from 2018 to 2022.
- 8 November – At least two people are killed and 12 others are reported missing after a fishing boat capsizes off the coast of Jeju Island.
- 9 November – South Korea accuses North Korea of jamming GPS signals in the Yellow Sea, causing disruptions to shipping and aviation.
- 14 November – Former assemblywoman Yoon Mee-hyang is convicted by the Supreme Court of fraud and embezzlement of funds from the Korean Council for Justice and Remembrance for the Issues of Military Sexual Slavery by Japan that she headed and is given a three-year suspended prison term.
- 15 November – Democratic Party of Korea leader Lee Jae-myung is convicted by the Seoul Central District Court of making false statements during his presidential campaign in 2022 and is given a one-year suspended prison sentence.
- 25 November – Lee Jae-myung is acquitted by the Seoul Central District Court of instigating a witness in a 2019 case involving Lee to commit perjury.
- 28 November – 2024 South Korean snowstorm: Three people are killed following incidents caused by heavy snowfall in Gyeonggi Province.

=== December ===
- 3 December – 2024 South Korean martial law: President Yoon declares martial law.
- 4 December – A majority of lawmakers in the National Assembly vote to rescind the declaration of martial law amid efforts by security forces to occupy the chamber and prevent the session. Shortly afterwards, martial law is lifted by the cabinet.
- 5 December –
  - The National Assembly votes to impeach Board of Audit and Inspection Chair Choe Jae-hae; Lee Chang-soo, chief of the Seoul Central District Prosecutors Office; and two of Lee's deputies for irregularities in investigations against President Yoon and First Lady Kim Keon-hee. Choe becomes the first head of the BAI to be impeached.
  - Defense minister Kim Yong-hyun resigns over his role in the martial law declaration.
- 7 December –
  - President Yoon issues an apology for declaring martial law.
  - President Yoon avoids being impeached for declaring martial law after only 195 lawmakers present of the 200 needed to remove him attend the National Assembly following a boycott by all but three MPs from his People Power Party.
- 8 December –
  - Former defense minister Kim Yong-hyun is arrested on charges related to the martial law declaration.
  - Interior minister Lee Sang-min resigns after an impeachment motion is filed against him in the National Assembly over his involvement in the martial law declaration.
- 9 December –
  - President Yoon is barred from leaving the country by the Justice Ministry as part of investigations to his martial law declaration.
  - A fishing boat capsizes after colliding with a sand barge off the coast of Pohang, killing seven of the boat's eight crew and leaving the remaining member missing.
- 11 December – National Police Commissioner Cho Ji-ho and Seoul Metropolitan Police Chief Kim Bong-sik are arrested on charges of insurrection for their role in the martial law declaration.
- 12 December – Rebuilding Korea Party leader Cho Kuk loses his seat in the National Assembly after the Supreme Court upholds his 2023 conviction and two-year sentence for using his influence to receive academic favors for his children and interfering with a corruption investigation when he was a presidential aide.
- 14 December – Yoon Suk Yeol becomes the third president of South Korea to be impeached after 204 lawmakers in the National Assembly approve a second impeachment motion filed against him for declaring martial law.
- 27 December – Han Duck-soo becomes the first acting president of South Korea to be impeached after 192 lawmakers in the National Assembly approve an impeachment motion filed against him for blocking investigations against President Yoon and his wife, colluding with Yoon on martial law and blocking the appointment of justices to fill vacancies in the Constitutional Court of Korea.
- 29 December – Jeju Air Flight 2216: A Boeing 737-800 operated by Jeju Air overshoots the runway while landing at Muan International Airport from Thailand and crashes into a barrier before exploding, killing all but two of its 181 passengers and crew.
- 30 December – A car ferry capsizes off the coast of Seosan, killing one person and leaving four others missing.
- 31 December – The Seoul Western District Court issues an arrest warrant for President Yoon on charges relating to his martial law declaration, making him the first sitting president of South Korea to be issued an arrest warrant.

== Holidays ==
As per Presidential Decree No. 28394, 2017. 10. 17., partially amended, the following days are declared holidays in South Korea:

- 1 January - New Year's Day
- 9 February to 11 February - Korean New Year
- 1 March - March 1st Movement Day
- 5 May - Children's Day South Korea
- 15 May - Buddha's Birthday
- 6 June - Memorial Day
- 15 August - National Liberation Day
- 16 September to 18 September - Chuseok
- 3 October - National Foundation Day
- 9 October - Hangul Day
- 25 December - Christmas Day

== Art and entertainment ==
- 2024 in South Korean music
- 2024 in South Korean television
- List of South Korean films of 2024
- List of 2024 box office number-one films in South Korea
- List of South Korean submissions for the Academy Award for Best International Feature Film
- 29th Busan International Film Festival
- 2024 Asia Contents Awards & Global OTT Awards

== Deaths ==
=== January ===
- 9 January – Choi Hong-suk, 35, volleyball player (Seoul Woori Card Wibee, national team).
- 19 January – Lee Doo-yong, 81, film director (The General in Red Robes, The Korean Connection, Mulleya Mulleya) and screenwriter.

=== February ===
- 5 February – Namkoong Won, 89, film actor (Woman of Fire, Inchon)

=== April ===
- 23 April – Ro Jai-bong, 88, Prime Minister (1990–1991)

=== September ===
- 11 September – Jeong Jae-mun, 87, political scientist and politician, MP (1985–2004).
- 15 September –
  - Cho Gyeong-mok, 87, politician, MP (1985–1992).
  - Nam Jae-hui, 90, politician, MP (1979–1992), minister of labor (1993–1994).
- 19 September – Tongsun Park, 89, lobbyist.
- 22 September – Park Hee-bu, 85, civil servant and politician, MP (1992–1996).
- 28 September – Choi Gwang-ryul, 88, lawyer and judge, justice of the constitutional court (1988–1994).
- 30 September – Park Ji-ah, 52, actress (The Coast Guard, 3-Iron, The Glory).

=== October ===
- 5 October – Jeong Hui-gyeong, 92, academic and politician, MP (1996–2000).
- 22 October – Go Jin-hwa, 61, politician, MP (2004–2008).
- 23 October – Lee Sang-deuk, 88, politician and convicted briber, MP (1988–2012).
- 25 October – Kim Soo-mi, 75, actress (Barefoot Ki-bong, Late Blossom, Mapado).
- 30 October – Jo Hea-jung, 71, volleyball player, Olympic bronze medallist (1976).

=== November ===
- 2 November – Seo Sang-hong, 75, lawyer and judge, chief secretary of the constitutional court (2005–2007).
- 9 November – Lee Shi-yoon, 89, lawyer and judge, justice of the Constitutional Court (1988–1993).
- 12 November – Song Jae-rim, 39, actor (The Moon Embracing the Sun).

=== December ===
- 30 December – Kim Soo-han, 96, Speaker of the National Assembly (1996–1998).

== See also ==
=== Country overviews ===
- History of Korea
- Outline of South Korea
- Government of South Korea
- Cabinet of South Korea
- Politics of South Korea
- Years in South Korea
- Timeline of Korean history

=== Related timelines for current period ===
- 2024
- 2020s
- 2020s in political history
