= Nam (Korean surname) =

- Hangul: 남
- Hanja: 南
- RR: Nam
- MR: Nam

Nam is a Korean family name meaning "south". The 2000 South Korean census found 257,178 people with this family name, of whom 150,394 belonged to the Uiryeong Nam bongwan. According to the same census, the place with the highest frequency of people belonging to that bongwan was Eumseong County, North Chungcheong Province, where it accounted for 1,021 people, or 1.21% of the population; this represented a significant drop both in numbers and in proportion from the 1985 census, when it accounted for 1,427 people, or 1.71% of the population.

== People ==
Korean people with this surname include:

- Nam Bo-ra (born 1989), South Korean actress
- Nam Bong-kwang (born 1981), South Korean wheelchair curler
- Nam Byeong-gil (1820–1869), Joseon mathematician and astronomer
- Nam Chang-hee (born 1957), South Korean plasma physicist
- Nam Da-reum (born 2002), South Korean actor
- Nam Da-won (born 1997), South Korean singer, member of girl group Cosmic Girls
- Nam Dae-sik (1948–2018), South Korean former football manager and player
- Nam Doh-hyeong (born 1983), South Korean voice actor
- Nam Dong-hoon (born 1984), South Korean modern pentathlete
- Eric Nam (born 1988), Korean American singer, songwriter, television personality
- Nam Eun-young (born 1970), South Korean handball player, Olympic gold medalist
- Nam Gi-ae (born 1961), South Korean actress
- Nam Gi-nam (born 1942), South Korean director of movies, cartoons and TV series
- Nam Gwang-hyun (born 1987), South Korean footballer
- Nam Gyu-ri (born 1985), South Korean singer, former member of girl group SeeYa
- Nam Hae-il (born 1947), South Korean former naval officer
- Nam Hye-seung, South Korean composer and music director
- Nam Hyun-hee (born 1981), South Korean fencer
- Nam Hyun-joon (born 1979), South Korean dancer, rapper, singer
- Nam Hyun-seong (born 1985), South Korean footballer
- Nam Hyun-woo (born 1985), South Korean former professional tennis player
- Nam Hyun-woo (field hockey) (born 1987), South Korean field hockey player
- Nam Ik-kyung (born 1983), South Korean retired footballer
- Nam Il (1913–1976), Russian-born North Korean military officer, former Minister of Foreign Affairs
- Nam In-soon (born 1958), South Korean politician and feminist activist
- Nam Jae-hui (1934–2024), South Korean journalist and politician
- Nam Jeong-im (1945–1992), South Korean actress
- Nam Ji-hyun (born 1990), South Korean actress and singer, former member of girl group 4Minute
- Nam Ji-hyun (born 1995), South Korean actress
- Nam Jie-youn (born 1983), South Korean former volleyball player
- Nam Joo-hyuk (born 1994), South Korean actor and model
- Nam Jung-hyun (born 1933), South Korean author
- Nam Ki-il (born 1974), South Korean football manager and former player
- Nam Ki-shim (born 1936), South Korean linguist and scholar
- Nam Ki-won (born 1966), South Korean para table tennis player, Paralympic bronze medalist
- Nam Ki-young (born 1962), South Korean football manager and former player
- Nam Kwan-woo (born 1955), South Korean equestrian
- Nam Kyung-jin (born 1988), South Korean freestyle wrestler
- Nam Kyung-pil (born 1965), South Korean politician, former governor of Gyeonggi Province
- Leonardo Nam (born 1979), Korean Australian actor
- Nam Myeong-ryeol (born 1959), South Korean actor
- Nam Na-yeong (born 1971), South Korean film editor
- Naomi Nari Nam (born 1985), American figure skater
- Nam Sang-ji (born 1989), South Korean actress
- Nam Sang-lan (born 1966), South Korean rower
- Nam Sang-mi (born 1984), South Korean actress
- Nam Sang-nam (born 1947), South Korean former swimmer
- Nam Sang-wan (born 1935), South Korean former sports shooter
- Nam Seung-gu (born 1963), South Korean gymnast
- Nam Seung-woo (born 1992), South Korean footballer
- Nam Su-hyeon (born 2005), South Korean archer, Olympic gold medalist
- Nam Su-il (1912–1972), South Korean weightlifter
- Nam Sun-ok (born 1969), South Korean volleyball player
- Nam Sung-ho (born 1975), South Korean canoeist
- Nam Sung-yong (1912–2001), South Korean marathon runner, Olympic bronze medalist
- Nam Tae-hee (born 1991), South Korean professional footballer
- Nam Tae-hi (1929–2013), South Korean martial artist, pioneering master of taekwondo
- Nam Tae-hyun (born 1994), South Korean singer, former member of boy group Winner
- Nam Won-gi (born 1963), South Korean alpine skier
- Nam Woo-hyun (born 1991), South Korean singer, member of boy group Infinite
- Nam Yeon-woo (born 1982), South Korean actor
- Nam Yeong-sin (born 1990), South Korean handball player
- Nam Yoo-sun (born 1985), South Korean swimmer
- Nam Yoon-ho (born 1984), South Korean curler
- Nam Yoon-su (born 1997), South Korean actor and model
- Nam Yu-jin (born 1995), South Korean singer-songwriter, composer, actress
- Nam Yun-bae (born 1987), South Korean taekwondo practitioner
