= 2025 Botswana medical crisis =

Public health disaster in Botswana

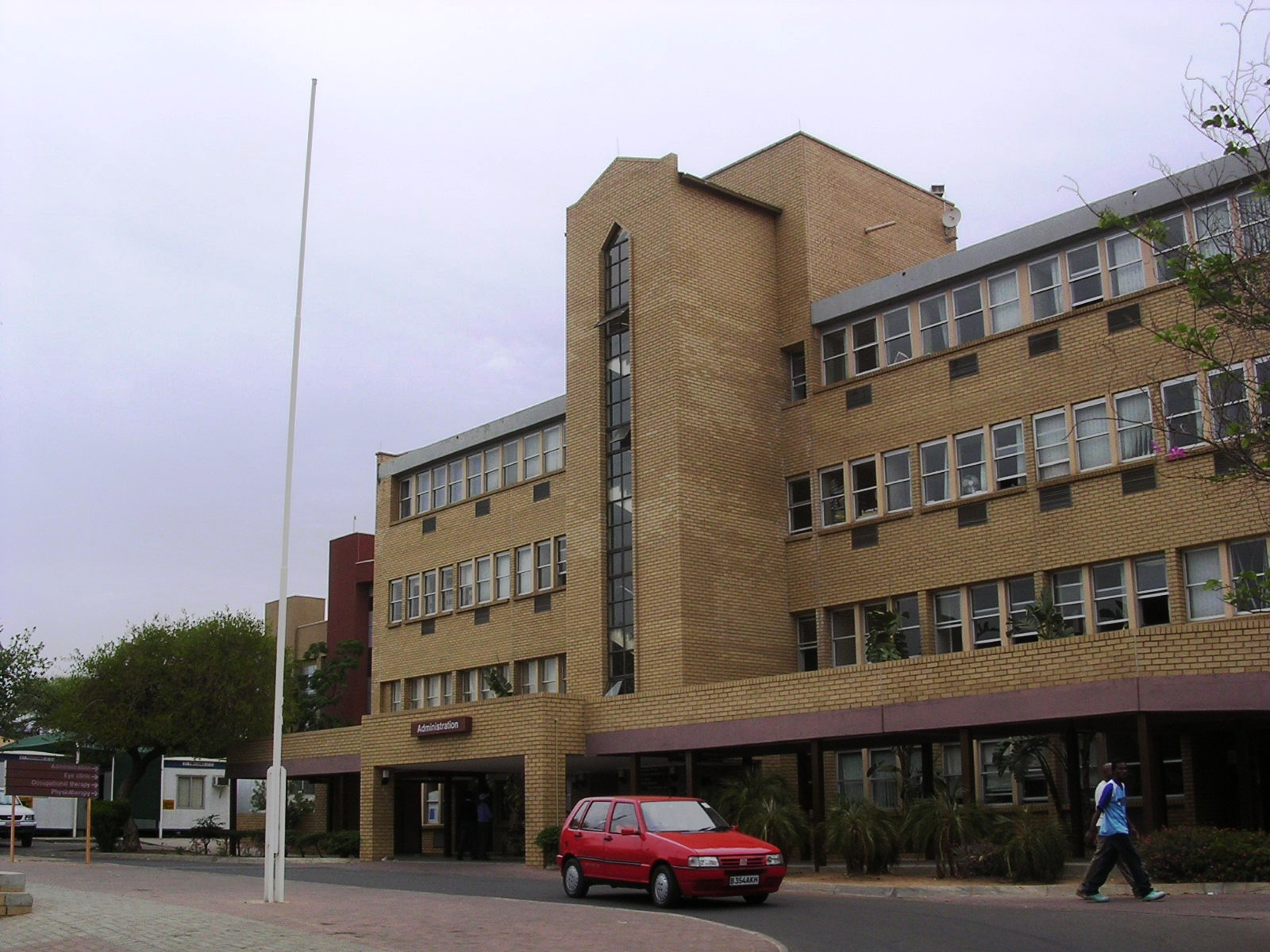
Princess Marina Hospital, the main hospital in Gaborone, Botswana

A healthcare crisis took place in Botswana from August to September 2025. The crisis was caused by severe revenue shortages in the country's healthcare sector. The shortages were caused in part due to a fall in global demand for diamonds, as the diamond industry funded Botswana's universal healthcare system. Another factor contributing to the crisis was cuts in foreign aid from the United States.

In 2025, hospitals and clinics suffered from shortages of essential supplies. This has been exacerbated by budget shortfalls and reduction of aid from the United States. Supply chain shortages were reported. On 25 August 2025, President Duma Boko declared a public health emergency. The country's military was ordered to distribute emergency supplies. By September 2025, medicines were delivered to different parts of the country. In November 2025, President Duma Boko announced that India would be offering medical assistance during a media briefing with Indian President Droupadi Murmu. A memorandum was signed between the two countries.

Following the crisis, Duma Boko stated that the country's healthcare system would see numerous reforms to prevent a similar crisis from happening in the future. Reforms included a restructuring of the national medicines procurement body, the expansion of public medicine, and the creation of a national health intelligence centre. Additionally, Boko stated that the African Continental Free Trade Area would help expand regional pharmaceutical industries.

== See also ==
- 2024–2025 South Korean medical crisis
