= January 2016 East Asia cold wave =

Severe cold snap that occurred in east asia in January 2016

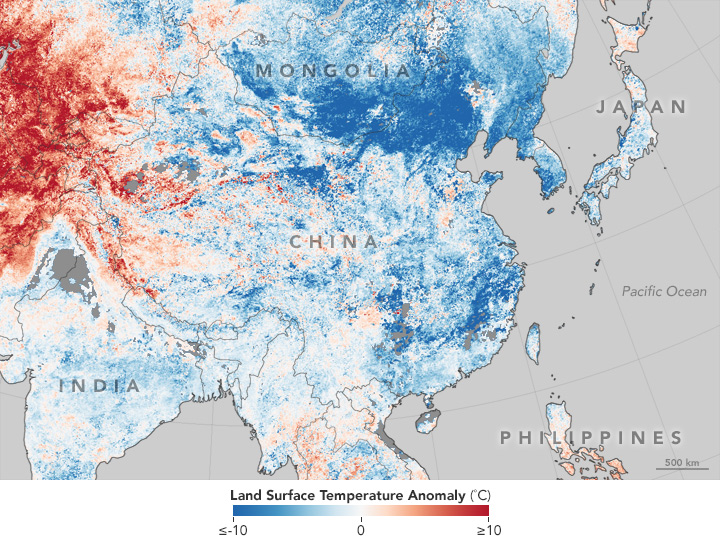
- Variation from average land surface temperatures between 17–24 January 2016

Meteorological history
- Formed: 18 January 2016
- Dissipated: 24 January 2016

Cold wave
- Lowest temp: −46.8 °C (−52.2 °F) in Inner Mongolia, Irkutsk Oblast and Zabaykalsky Krai, −19 °C (−2 °F) in Pyongyang (lowest urban temperature)
- Max. snowfall: 142 cm (56 in) in Kitahiroshima, Japan

Overall effects
- Fatalities: At least 109
- Areas affected: East Asia, Southeast Asia and South Asia

In late January 2016, a cold wave struck much of East Asia, parts of mainland Southeast Asia and parts of northern South Asia, bringing record cold temperatures and snowfall to many regions. Sleet was reported in Okinawa for the first time on record, and many other regions saw their lowest temperatures in decades. Snowfall and frigid weather stranded thousands of people across four countries. At least 85 people in Taiwan died from hypothermia and cardiac arrest following a sudden drop in temperature during the weekend of January 22–24. The cold claimed a further fourteen lives in Thailand, and snowstorms resulted in six deaths across Japan. This event was driven by a fast Arctic warming that occurred within the troposphere, forcing the Arctic Oscillation to change phase rapidly from positive (in late December) to negative (in late January), facilitating the atmospheric blocking and associated Siberian high buildup.

== Hong Kong ==
On 24 January, the temperature at the Hong Kong Observatory fell to 3.1 °C (37.6 °F), the coldest in 59 years. Hundreds of people hiked up Tai Mo Shan for sightseeing, where temperatures fell to a record low of −6.0 °C (21.2 °F). Many were also on Tai Mo Shan participating in a 100 km marathon. 129 required rescue and 67 were hospitalised for signs of hypothermia. The Fire Services Department (FSD) deployed 53 fire appliances, 39 ambulances and more than 300 personnel. The Government Flying Service evacuated eight patients by helicopter from Tai Mo Shan and Sunset Peak to Pamela Youde Nethersole Eastern Hospital and the airport. The FSD also responded to 130 calls at Kowloon Peak. In addition, the Civil Aid Service and Hong Kong Police Force were mobilised.

Classes were cancelled for more than 510,000 students of kindergartens, primary schools, and the English Schools Foundation on 25 January. The closure was suggested by the Hong Kong Professional Teachers' Union and it is believed to have been the first time the Education Bureau has ever cancelled classes due to cold weather. In the face of some criticism the government noted that most schools do not have heaters. The vice chairman of the Aided Primary School Heads' Association stated that the decision was justified as slippery roads could endanger school buses, which in Hong Kong are not fitted with winter tires.

== Japan ==
Snowstorms across Japan killed six people and injured 100 others. More than 600 flights were disrupted across the nation. Okinawa observed sleet for the first time since reliable records began. Amami Ōshima saw snow for the first time in 115 years. Record snowfall blanketed portions of the mainland, with Nagasaki observing 17 cm (6.7 in). On Honshu, the main island of Japan, 142 cm (56 in) of snow was recorded at Kitahiroshima, Hiroshima and 59 cm (23 in) at Suzu, Ishikawa. Temperatures in Tokyo fell to −2.6 °C (27.3 °F), the lowest recorded since 1984. Temperatures fell to record lows across much of western Japan. And Kamikawa in Hokkaido record -32°C. Mt. Fuji recorded -31°C. Nagano recorded -25°C.

== Mainland China ==
Snow and sleet were reported in parts of Guangzhou, the first time these had been observed since 1967 and 1956 respectively. Snow also fell on Shenzhen, a rare occurrence for the region. At least four people died of carbon monoxide poisoning from a heating system in Guangzhou. Farther north, the minimum temperature in Shanghai fell to −7.2 °C (19.0 °F), lowest since 1990, with light snow falling on the morning of 23 January. Twenty-four weather stations observed all-time record lows. Temperatures across Inner Mongolia fell to a record low of −46.8 °C (−52.2 °F).

== Korean Peninsula ==
Snow and cold weather forced the cancellation of 1,200 flights on Jejudo, off the southwestern tip of the Korean Peninsula, stranding approximately 90,300 passengers. Ulleungdo was blanketed with 137.3 cm (54.1 in) of snow. Temperatures in Seoul fell to −18 °C (0 °F), the lowest in 15 years. Many all-time low temperature records were broken in cities across the south of the country, especially on Jejudo, where Seogwipo and Seongsan recorded the lowest temperatures on record, at −6.4 °C (20.5 °F) and −6.2 °C (20.8 °F), respectively. In North Korea, temperatures fell to −19 °C (−2 °F) in Pyongyang and to −37.5 °C (−35.5 °F) in Samjiyŏn County. 40,000 construction workers were reportedly withdrawn from construction sites.

== Taiwan ==
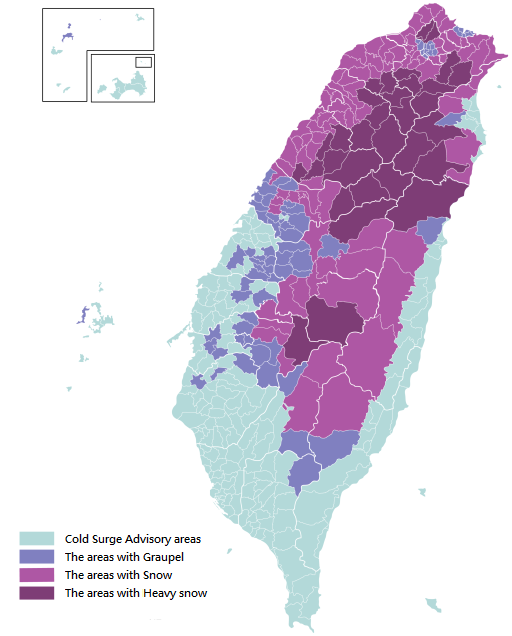
Snowfall levels in Taiwan, January 2016

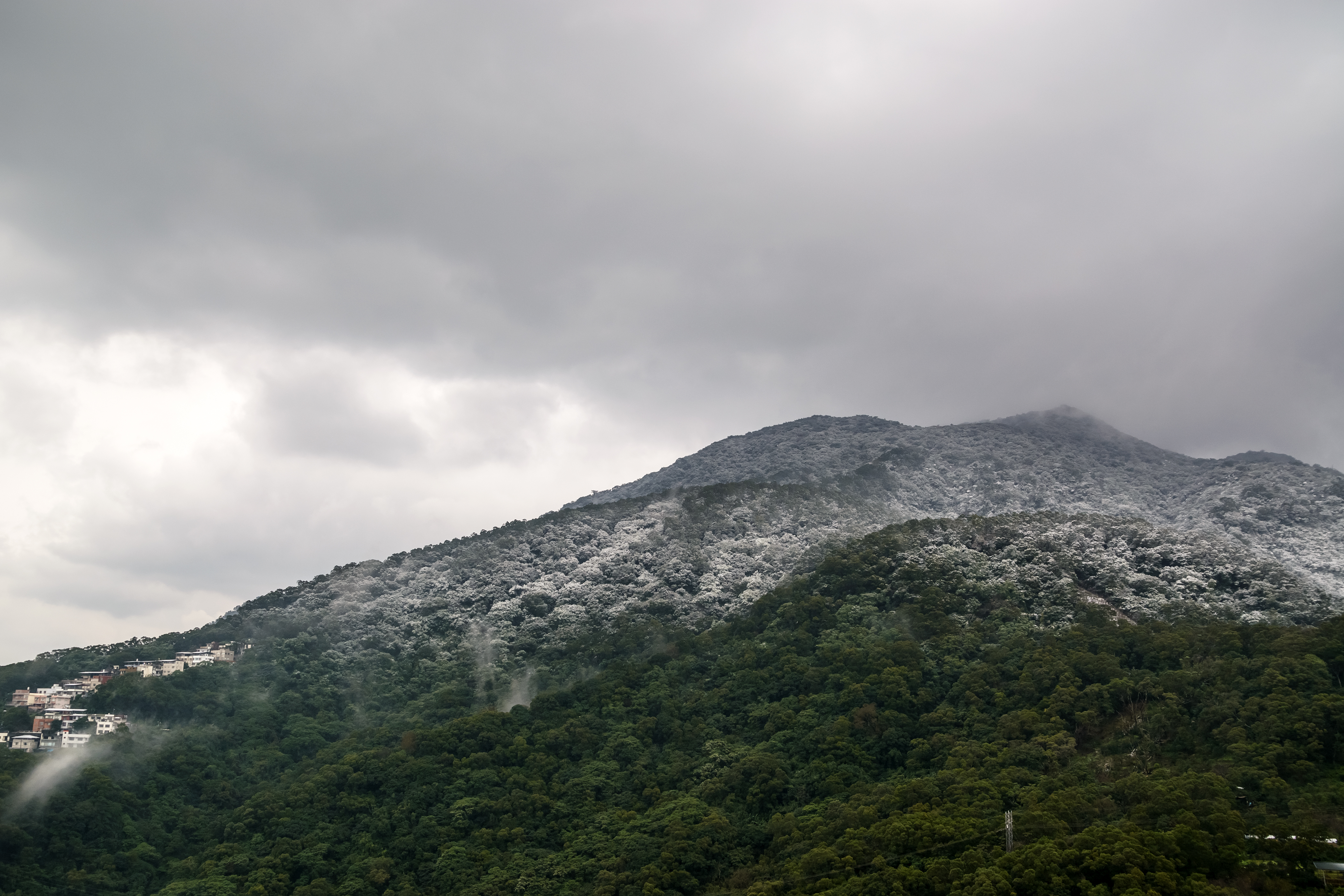
A 500-meter snowfall line on Datun Mountain in Yangmingshan, Taipei

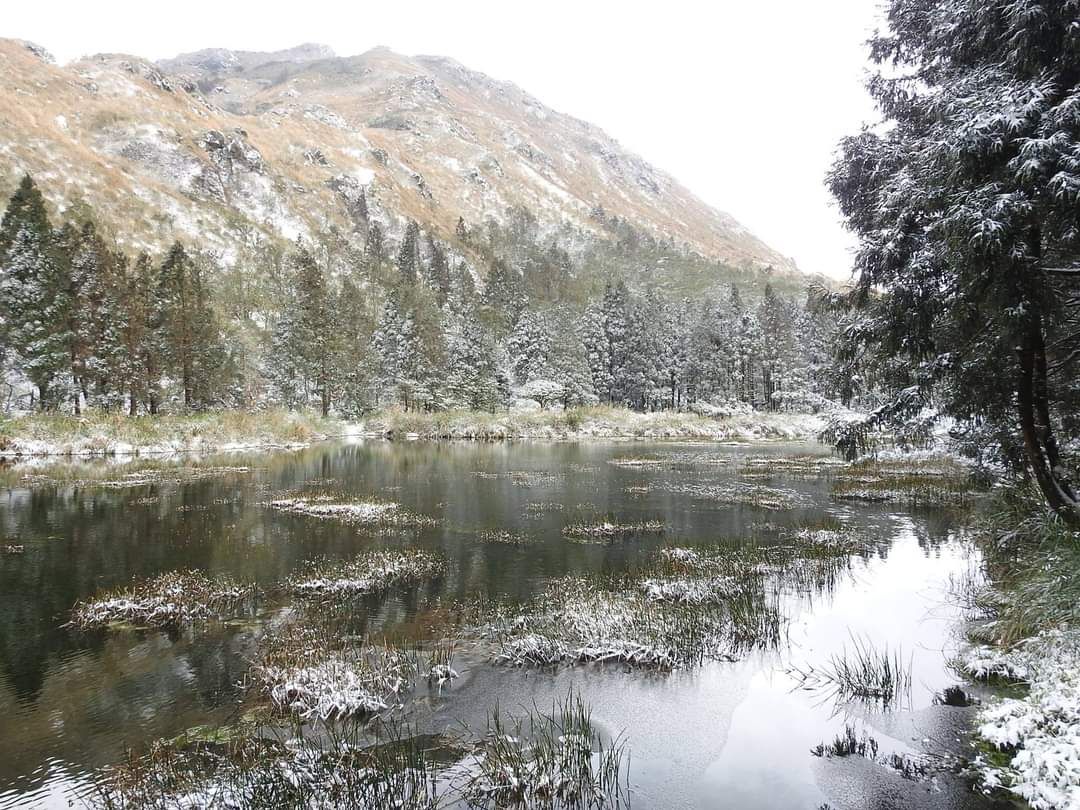
Snowfalls in Yangmingshan, Taipei

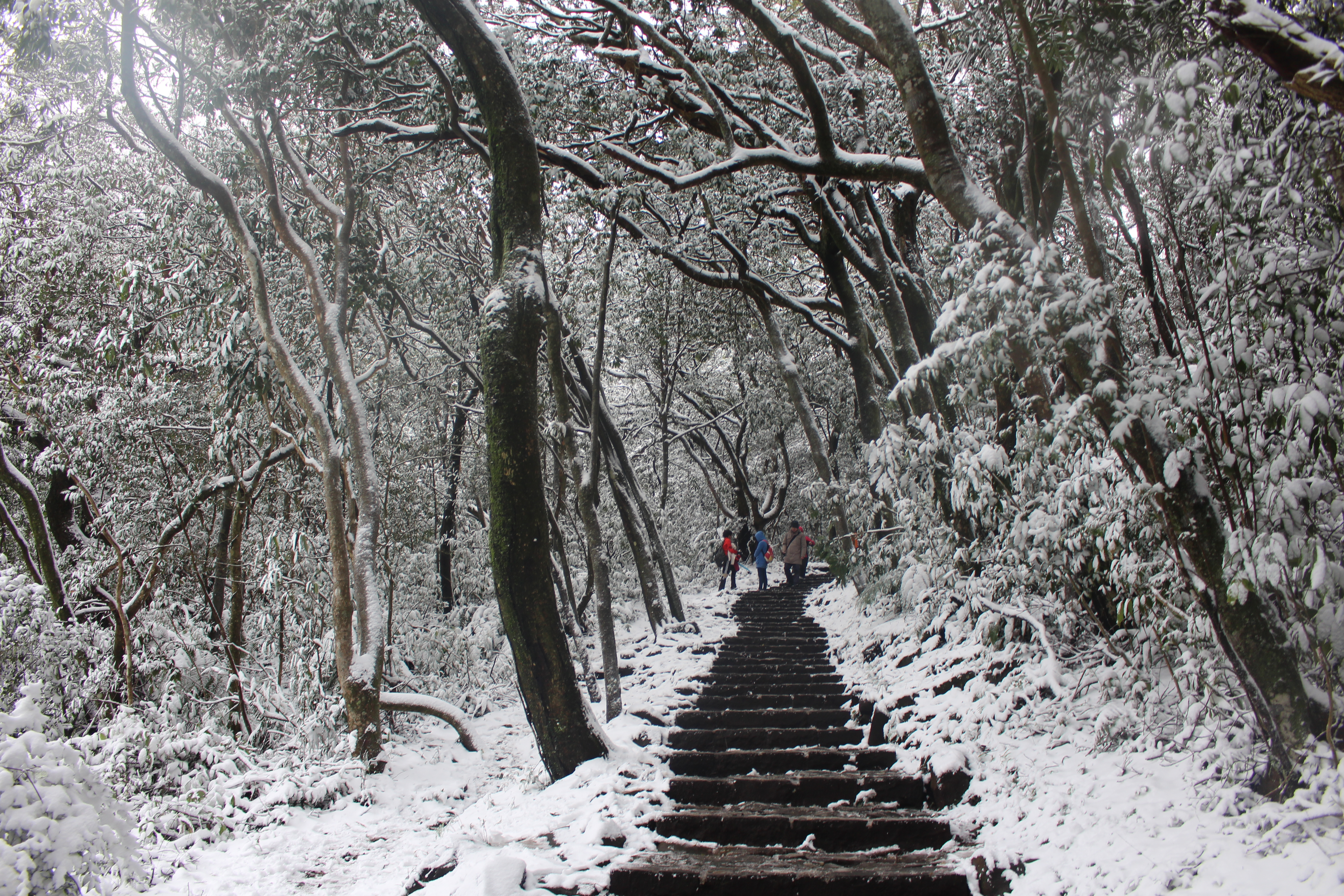
Snowfalls in Yangmingshan, Taipei

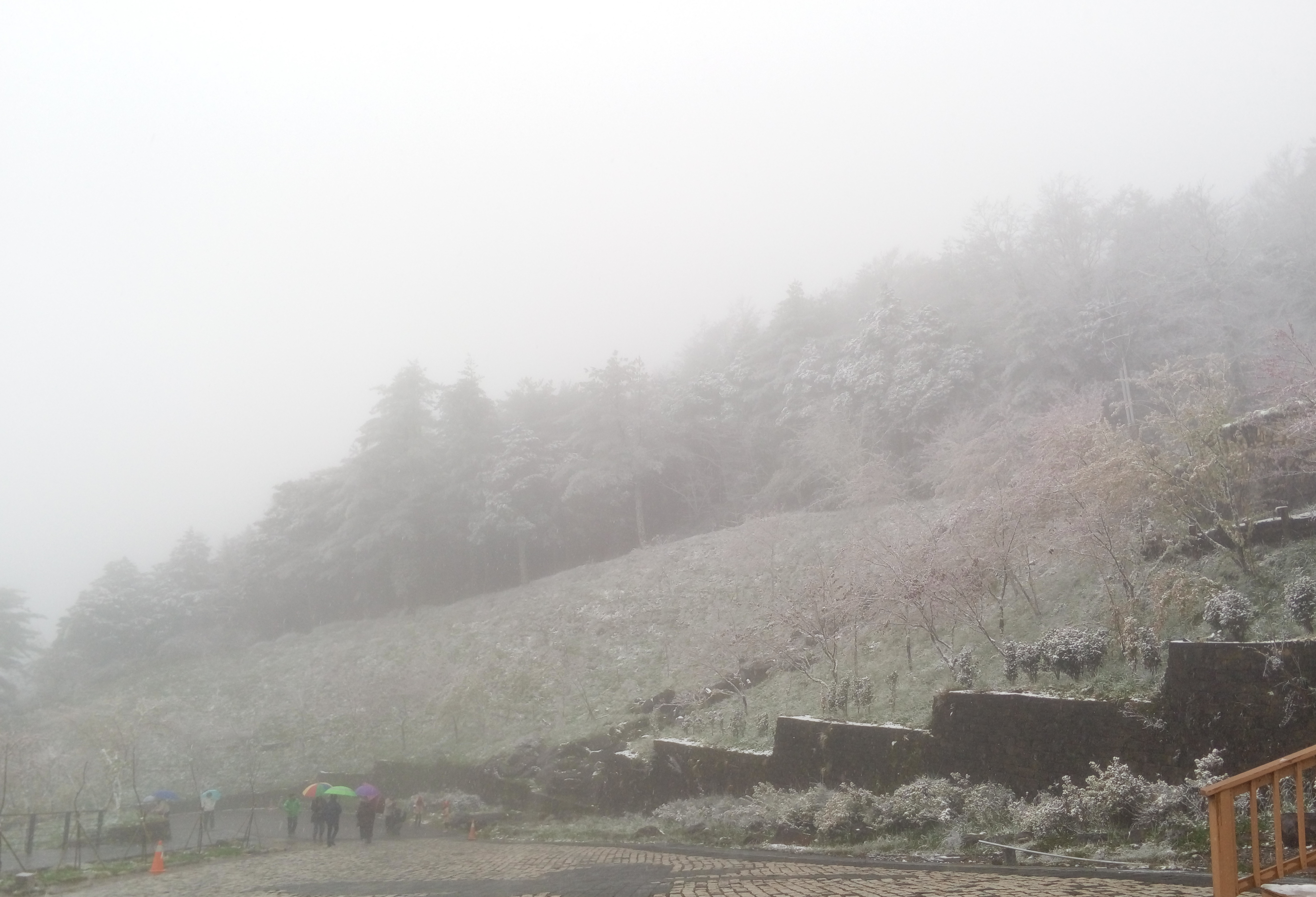
Snowfalls at Xiang-Yang, Taitung County in January 2016 East Asia cold wave

A surge of cold air during the weekend of January 22–24 brought temperatures as low as 4 °C (39 °F) to Taipei, the lowest temperatures in 44 years. Sleet was observed in Taipei City at 16:00 on 24 January. Yangmingshan, the Matsu Islands, and Kinmen all observed their coldest temperatures on record at −3.7 °C (25.3 °F), 0.3 °C (32.5 °F), and 1.3 °C (34.3 °F), respectively. Due to the subtropical climate, many homes do not have central heating or insulation, and residents struggled to cope with the temperatures. Overall, at least 85 people died from hypothermia and cardiac arrest in Taiwan, including 66 people in Taipei and Taoyuan, and another 16 in Kaohsiung. The majority of victims died in their homes. The Ministry of Health subsequently claimed only three people died and 45 were admitted to hospital emergency wards. In Su'ao, Yilan measured 5 °C (41 °F), Xinwu, Taoyuan measured 4.2 °C (39.6 °F), and Hsinchu City measured 2.8 °C (37.0 °F). Snow accumulated to 16.2 cm (6.38 in) on Jade Mountain.

The cold weather caused severe damage to crops, with losses exceeding NT$20 million (US$600,000) in Miaoli County alone. President Ma Ying-jeou declared the crop damage a national concern.

== Vietnam ==
In Hanoi, Vietnam, the lowest temperature in the downtown recorded was 5 °C (41 °F), the lowest temperature measured in the city in over 20 years. Snowfall was recorded in the mountainous areas of Ba Vì near the capital on January 24.

Snow fell across the mountains of Lào Cai Province in Northern Vietnam. There was heavy snowfall in the area of Sa Pa town and the high mountains of Bát Xát District. The temperature of −4.2 °C (24.4 °F) in Sa Pa broke all records. This is the historical low temperature since the observation data in Sa Pa since 1956.

In Mẫu Sơn, Lạng Sơn Province, the temperature dropped below −5 °C (23 °F); snow quickly covered the mountain slopes. In Tam Đảo District, Vĩnh Phúc Province, after many hours of frost, by the end of the morning of January 24, there was snow on the highest peak of Tam Đảo mountains. The same day, snow also fell in Hang Kia and Pà Cò communes in Mai Châu District of Hòa Bình Province. Meanwhile, Bắc Yên, Vân Hồ and Mộc Châu districts in Sơn La Province recorded temperatures of −5 °C (23 °F) to −7 °C (19 °F) on January 23 and 24. Temperatures were expected to continue to plummet.

Some other places recorded the first snowfall in their history, most notably the North Central Coast provinces. In Lũng Cao commune of Bá Thước District (Thanh Hóa Province) and Na Ngoi and Mường Lống communes of Kỳ Sơn District (Nghệ An Province), snowfall lasted for many hours early on January 24.

== Rest of Southeast Asia ==
In Thailand, temperatures fell to 15 °C (59 °F) in Bangkok and 13 °C (55 °F) in Chai Nat Province. 14 people across Thailand died, many of whom were reportedly had chronic or respiratory diseases. and In Doi Inthanon below 0 °C (32 °F).

In Laos, temperatures in Houaphanh Province dropped to 0 °C (32 °F) and some upland areas experienced frost, causing the death of several buffaloes in Xam Neua District.

In the Batanes islands of the Philippines, temperatures dropped below 10 °C, a record low for the Philippines at sea level. In the mountainous city of Baguio, where tourists typically flock because of the cooler weather, temperatures dropped to 9 °C (48 °F), the city's coldest recorded temperature in 2016.

In Cambodia, temperatures in some parts of the country dropped to 19 °C (66 °F).

In Myanmar, the lowest temperature recorded was −5 °C (23 °F) in Putao. In Yangon, temperatures fell to 14 °C (57 °F).

In Malaysia, temperatures in some parts of the country dropped to between 21 °C (70 °F) and 16 °C (61 °F). Kuala Lumpur city centre registered a day time high of 19.8 °C (67.6 °F) on the afternoon of 25 January. The lowest temperature recorded was 10 °C (50 °F) in Keningau, Sabah. In Kundasang, temperatures fell to 8 °C (46 °F).

== South Asia ==
In northern India, temperatures dropped to −16.6 °C (2.1 °F) in some areas, and below 5 °C (41 °F) in New Delhi. Fog resulting from the low temperatures led to delays at Indira Gandhi International Airport and forced cancellations of train services in New Delhi.

In Nepal, 700 schools were shut in Rautahat and Parsa owing to thick fog and the cold, and the number of patients with cold-related diseases increased in medical facilities throughout the country.

== See also ==
- 2024 South Korean snowstorm
- January 2016 United States blizzard
