= 2024–2026 South Korean medical crisis =

- Date: February 20, 2024 – present (2 years, 8 months, 4 weeks and 1 day)
- Location: South Korea
- Cause: Government plan to increase medical student admission quotas; Imbalance of medical service specialties; Low insurance payouts and government support

The 2024–2026 South Korean medical crisis is an ongoing healthcare crisis following the announcement of new government policies that significantly increased medical student admission quotas. In response to the policy, thousands of residents and interns resigned, which resulted in triage being implemented and less essential medical procedures being delayed, with some patients reporting months long delays. There has also been student boycotts and street protests. The South Korean government labeled medical professionals' actions as "illegal collective actions."

The government said that quota increase is needed because South Korea has a rapidly aging population and that the increasing proportion of elderly people will place an increasing burden on the health care system as time goes by. They also report that rural areas and key medical fields such as pediatrics are suffering from a doctor shortage. On the other hand, the Korean Medical Association (KMA), a trade union which represents doctors, stated that governmental mismanagement is the primary cause of the shortage, that reform—rather than an increased number of doctors—is needed to address it. They have also argued that the healthcare system struggles with insufficient financial support from the government and that increasing the quantity of medical students would require lowered standards that would cause a decrease in the quality of medical care.

== Background and causes ==
=== Aging population of South Korea ===
South Korea's population pyramid (1960–2020)

South Korea has the lowest birth rates in the world, with the most rapidly aging population. The total fertility rate (TFR) has plummeted over the decades and researchers say that if current trends continue, the country's population will be cut almost in half by the end of the century. In 2020, in the midst of the COVID-19 pandemic, the country recorded more deaths than births for the first time in modern history, resulting in population decline. Those who support the government's quota increase say that South Korea will need many more doctors in the future as elderly people become a larger and larger share of the population, since elderly people require more medical care. A 2023 study by the Lancet reported that while Korea has a strong health care system, the aging population will begin placing pressure on the system by 2040.

=== Shortage of doctors in key fields and in rural areas ===
According to South Korean President Yoon Suk-Yeol, who instituted the quota increase in 2024, the medical system is collapsing, with pediatrics, obstetrics, gynecology, and other specialties having a lack of manpower which has resulted in treatments being delayed. He stated that rural areas have an especially severe lack of medical professionals. According to a 2023 study by the Organisation for Economic Co-operation and Development (OECD) South Korea has the lowest number of doctors per capita out of all high-income countries in the OECD.

In 2023, 69% of local medical centers could not fill their quota of doctors. Examples of small cities which have been struggling with shortages of doctors include Seosan, South Chungcheong Province and Sokcho, Gangwon Province. Medical centers in both of these cities report difficulties in filling specialist positions in spite of offering salaries of up to 420 million won (about $300,000 USD).

=== Government healthcare regulations ===
The healthcare system has a mandatory designation system that integrates all doctors and private medical institutions into a single public health insurance system, which has fees set by the government. Healthcare practitioners argue that fees are too low when compared to other OECD countries, and government reimbursements are not high enough. Health care providers turn to treatments that are not insured or to high-volume, low-margin treatments to increase revenue. The low fees also allow patients to seek second opinions at low cost, increasing the workload for medical workers. The government negotiates annually with medical professional organizations about fee increases and this debate has persisted for several years.

The government mandates especially low medical fees for pediatrics and some other specialties, which requires doctors in those fields to work long hours and to see as many patients per day as possible in order to generate revenue. Because of this, many doctors in South Korea choose to enter specialties like plastic surgery, where compensation is much higher and working hours are much lower. This has resulted in shortages of doctors in key fields. Compared to other OECD countries, Korea has a fairly large number of people who chose to become nurses. In spite of that, burnout leads to high turnover, and the result is that there is a fairly small proportion of active nurses.

According to medical educators in Korea, because prosecution for medical malpractice is high, students are reluctant to enter high-risk fields, which is a primary cause of shortages in those fields. Approximately 750 South Korean doctors are accused of medical malpractice every year, which is many times higher than in Japan, the United Kingdom and Germany. One study shows the government does not provide enough support for medical education and residency training, making medical schools rely on their attached hospitals to generate profits. These university hospitals depend on the low-cost labor of residents and often require them to work long hours, with many reporting that they work up to 100 hours per week.

=== History of medical school admission quotas in South Korea ===
Since 2006, the admission quota of medical schools has been 3,058 per academic year. It was decreased from 3,500 in 2000, the year of a previous doctors' strike. That strike was started in response to government legislation that aimed to prevent prescription drug abuse by banning doctors from selling prescription drugs. Doctors stated that the legislation would greatly reduce their income and they went on strike that year. The government later offered concessions to the doctors and they returned to work, bringing the 2000 strike to an end.

== Resolutions and negotiations ==
=== Adjusting the increased quota ===
On April 19, 2024, the government offered adjusted healthcare reforms where medical schools determine their own 2025 intake admissions, lowering the designated quotas by up to 50% for 2025 while maintaining the original increased quota from 2026 onwards. In May of that year, the quota increase was reduced from 2,000 to 1,500 for one upcoming academic year. This followed updated numbers from universities wanting a lower quota for conflict resolution between professors and other faculty. However, the Korean Medical Association (KMA), residents and interns maintained their stance. In April of 2025, the government announced that the quota for 2026 would be reduced down to 3,058, the original quota from before the strike began.

=== Hiring doctors from foreign countries ===
In May, the government planned to allow vetted foreign doctors to practice in Korea. In response, the head of the KMA, Lim Hyun-taek, posted on Facebook a screenshot of a news report of newly graduated Somali doctors captioned "Coming Soon," with the implied subtext being that these foreign doctors would be inferior. It was widely criticized as "racist" and "exploiting Islamophobia and stereotyping against developing countries" and was swiftly deleted.

The government's proposals are part of an effort to prepare South Korean society to become increasingly multiethnic. The number of foreign-born people in South Korea reached 2.5 million in 2024 and 10% of new marriages in 2024 were between a Korean and a non-Korean. Since the 2010s there has been an official government program for international healthcare collaboration with Middle Eastern and African countries which has resulted in over 130 Middle Eastern specialist doctors coming to South Korea since 2024. These foreign-born doctors report being generally satisfied with their hospital environment.

== Reactions ==
=== Government ===
The crisis started on February 6, 2024. The Yoon government announced an increase in medical school enrollment by 2,000 per year from 2025, raising the quota to 5,058.

In opposition, medical organizations such as the Korean Medical Association (KMA) said that the existing number of doctors in major hospitals is already sufficient. However, the government continued with the plan. South Korean President Yoon Suk Yeol denied that the quota increase would degrade medical education and stated that the proposed increase of 2,000 students is the minimum required to meet the needs of the aging population and said that the increase is non-negotiable. He announced that if striking the doctors did not return to work, the government would suspend their medical licenses.

Within weeks, the government raised the crisis level of the country's medical system to "serious", and they established a Central Disaster and Safety Countermeasure Headquarters, headed by the Prime Minister, to coordinate the government's response. Situation rooms were set up to manage the transportation of severely ill patients in major regions. A group of medical professors and students applied for an injunction to suspend the quota increase, which was later rejected by the Seoul High Court.

The Ministry of Health and Welfare issued a return-to-work order to interns and residents, offering clemency to those who would resume work and threatening to punish whoever refused to return to work by March 1 using administrative sanctions and judicial measures, such as 3-month license suspensions which would delay their physician qualification by more than a year. The Ministry also legalized telemedicine for all clinics and treatment centers, and started allowing experienced nurses to perform some tasks typically reserved only to physicians, such as CPR and medicating critical patients. In addition, the Ministry also requested that the police open a criminal investigation against five senior members of the Korean Medical Association. In May of 2025 after 15 months of investigation, it was announced that they would face prosecution.

In March, the Ministry began inspecting hospitals to check work attendance, and stated that they would suspend the licenses of over 5,000 residents who were found to be absent. Only 565 doctors returned by March 1, and on March 8, it was reported that 92% of trainee doctors were sill absent. The Government also implemented triage to protect regional emergency centers, deployed military and public health doctors to affected hospitals to ensure emergency patient care and suspended the licenses of two leaders of the Korean Medical Association. In the same month, Prime Minister Han Duck-soo announced a plan to deal with the situation. He stated that the government would set aside money in the budget to support hiring replacement doctors and that those doctors who chose to return to work would be rewarded with increased compensation.

In April 2024, President Yoon gave an hour-long address to the nation to reaffirm the quota increase and appeal to the public:

As the president, I regret not being able to promptly address the public inconvenience ... All rational people will agree that the country faces a shortage of medical doctors.

— Yoon Suk Yeol, President of South Korea

By July, resident attendance rate stood at 8.4%, while the rate of attendance for interns was 3.4%. To fill vacancies, the Ministry of Health and Welfare announced a plan to recruit 7,645 residents from teaching hospitals. The Ministry of Education announced measures intended to offer flexibility to medical schools to help prevent boycotting students from failing due to insufficient attendance. These measure include allowing schools to assess students on a yearly basis rather than a semester basis, and allowing them to offer night, online, and/or weekend classes so that students can catch up with course work that they missed. At an August 16 National Assembly parliamentary hearing, Health and Welfare Minister Cho Kyoo-hong planned additional reforms to increase medical school admissions in early September.

In December, the short-lived martial law declaration by President Yoon of the People Power Party ordered doctors back to work. However, the martial law declaration was overturned within 24 hours and President Yoon was later impeached and removed from office because of it. On June 3, Lee Jae-Myung of the Democratic Party was elected president. As part of his campaign, Lee had harshly criticized Yoon's handling of the medical crisis and promised to bring it to a swift resolution.

=== Associations ===
The Korean Medical Association (KMA) stated that the right to resign is constitutionally protected, and has been organizing protests against the government's policy. The Korea Intern Resident Association opposed the quota increase and return-to-work order. The Korean Health and Medical Workers' Union voted on August 2024 in favor of a general strike with 91% of workers across 61 hospitals in support. This was in response to furloughs, unpaid leave, mandatory overtime, and other hospital austerity emergency measures. It was called off after negotiations with hospitals for pay raises and improved working conditions. According to the Korea Intern Resident Association, interns and residents have 36-hour shifts, while shifts in the United States are less than 24 hours. Half of American doctors work no more than 60 hours weekly, while Korean residents sometimes work over 100 hours a week at an average salary of 70 million won (about $50,000).

Following the 2025 presidential election in July, the Korean Medical Association put out a statement saying that they hope newly-elected president Lee Jae-myung would make resolving the crisis a top priority.

=== Patient groups and public reaction ===
Patient groups largely opposed the strike, and reported that their access to essential medical procedures was severely curtailed. In July, 92 patient groups including the Union of Korea Breast Cancer Patients, Korea Alliance of Patients Organization and Korean Organization for Rare Diseases urged the government and the striking doctors to come to a compromise as fast as possible and to prioritize the needs of patients. Cancer and ALS patient groups and Korean Buddhist Jogye Order called for doctors to return quickly.

At the outset of the crisis, a public opinion poll by Gallop indicated that 76% of the South Korean population supported the quota increase and 16% opposed it. As time went on, criticism of the governments handling of the situation grew. A poll in March showed that 49% said that the Yoon government's response to the strike had been poor, and 41% said that mediation should be done. Critics have argued that they are motivated by a desire to maintain an elite, highly-paid status in South Korea by keeping their numbers low.

=== The Democratic Party of Korea ===
At the outset of the crisis in February 2024, Democratic Party politician Lee Jae-myung opposed the strike and supported the quota increase. Lee would later become President of South Korea following the 2025 election. While campaigning for president, he criticized the ruling People Power Party's handling of the situation, and said that a compromise solution was needed. He stated that he would resolve the issue by creating a public participation committee, which would involve both experts and members of the public. He also made a campaign promise to establish publicly-funded medical schools in rural areas to address the rural doctors shortage, but this was also criticized as impractical by the Korean Medical Association and others in the medical community.

=== Doctors and medical experts ===
Medical professionals argued the plan would degrade medical education, and asserted that the quota increase would not immediately resolve manpower problems because training takes ten years. A fresh medical student becoming a specialist takes six-years of studying, a one-year internship and three to four years of residency. While those who supported the quota increase replied that, on average, medical schools in South Korea have only one-third as many students per school compared to schools in Germany and half as many compared to schools in the United States; each medical school professor in South Korea handles an average of 1.6 students.

In late February, many doctors resigned collectively, The Ministry of Health and Welfare found 10,034 resignation letters and 9,006 resignations among interns and residents in 100 hospitals. Senior doctors and professors from 20 hospitals planned to resign on March 25 in solidarity, but only started working reduced hours on that day. In July, many doctors across South Korea participated in a one-day walkout.

=== Students ===
From the start of the crisis in February 2024, many medical undergraduates suspended their studies, boycotting the proposed change. Some universities, such as Gachon University and Gyeongsang National University announced that they would delay the start of the semester. Over 14,000 students submitted leave-of-absence applications, which is over 66% of all medical students in the country. By August 2024, in spite of some government concessions, attendance stood at only 7.2%.

=== Media ===
The Emergency Response Headquarters, headed by Prime Minister Han Duck-soo, conducted daily press briefings in March. The government also produced promotional videos to criticize the strike movement. The videos could be seen in movie theaters, public buses, subways and elevators. Healthcare workers argued that they were vilified by President Yoon and the media in a way that undermined public trust in the doctor-patient relationship.

== Impact ==
Severance Hospital, Seoul National University Hospital, and many other hospitals were forced to cancel or postpone many surgeries. Some hospitals shortened operation durations or prioritized critically ill patients.

An ophthalmology professor in his 40's died of brain hemorrhage on March 24, and an internal medicine professor in his 50's died of intestinal obstruction on April 20. This raised concerns about health risks to overworked medical school professors covering for resigning residents.

== See also ==
- 2025 Botswana medical crisis
- Healthcare in South Korea
- 2024 in South Korea
