= 2020 South Korean medical strike =

In 2020, South Korean medical strike happened when South Korean medical workers went on strike to protest the government's plan to expand admissions to medical schools.

== Background ==
It is reported that faculty members of medical schools in South Korea have a substantial level of burnout. A nationwide survey conducted in 2020 found that 37.1% of faculty members reported high levels of burnout. This is higher than the rate reported in large-scale surveys abroad. Excessive regulation by the government or university was regarded as The most significant stressor or burnout source.

The payment system is part of the Korean Relative Value Unit (RVU) system, which is based on the US system but does not properly reflect resource consumption. Low medical reimbursement in South Korea has had a negative effect on physicians, leading to low wages and job dissatisfaction.

South Korean government's medical policy has led to financial losses for medical professionals, which has discouraged them from entering certain fields or working in rural areas. This has resulted in a shortage of doctors in some areas and a lack of specialty doctors in rural areas. The government planned to expand admission to medical schools, instead of increasing payments to medical workers and giving them better working conditions. The 2020 medical strike in South Korea was caused by a government plan to increase the number of medical students in the country.

== Course of the strike ==
The strike was organized by the Korea Medical Association (KMA), including interns and resident doctors at hospitals. The strike action came as South Korea battled a resurgence of COVID-19 cases and Prime Minister Chung Sye-kyun urged the intern and resident doctors to call off the 24-hour strike. However, the trainee doctors taking part in the strike maintained that South Korea already had enough medical professionals and they should be better paid to encourage a wider geographical spread. The three-day strike forced South Korea's five major general hospitals to limit their hours and delay scheduled surgeries.

The effects of this strike on patient mortality rate were studied retrospectively in a cross-sectional study conducted from August 21 to September 8, 2020. The results showed that the ED resident strike did not influence the mortality rate of patients who visited emergency departments (EDs) of six training hospitals in Daegu. However, there was an increase in the number of patients admitted and an increase in length of ED stay during this period.
