= Seo Sang-hong =

South Korean lawyer and judge (1949–2024)

- 서상홍

Chief Secretary of the Constitutional Court of Korea
- In office December 2005 – March 2007
- Preceded by: Lee Beom-ju
- Succeeded by: Ha Cheol-yong

Personal details
- Born: 1949 Busan, South Korea
- Died: 2 November 2024 (aged 75)
- Education: Seoul National University
- Occupation: Lawyer; Judge

Seo Sang-hong (Korean: 서상홍; 1949 – 2 November 2024) was a South Korean lawyer and judge.

== Career ==
He served as Chief Secretary of the Constitutional Court from 2005 to 2007.

Seo died on 2 November 2024, at the age of 75.
