= Park Hee-bu =

South Korean politician (1938–2024)

- 박희부

Member of the National Assembly of South Korea for Yeongi-gun
- In office 30 May 1992 – 29 May 1996

Personal details
- Born: 5 October 1938 Yeongi County, Korea, Empire of Japan
- Died: 22 September 2024 (aged 85)
- Party: Unification National Party
- Education: Dongguk University
- Occupation: Civil servant

Park Hee-bu (Korean: 박희부; 5 October 1938 – 22 September 2024) was a South Korean civil servant and politician. A member of the Unification National Party, he served in the National Assembly from 1992 to 1996.

Park died on 22 September 2024, at the age of 85.
