= 2024 South Korean snowstorm =

Historic weather event in South Korea

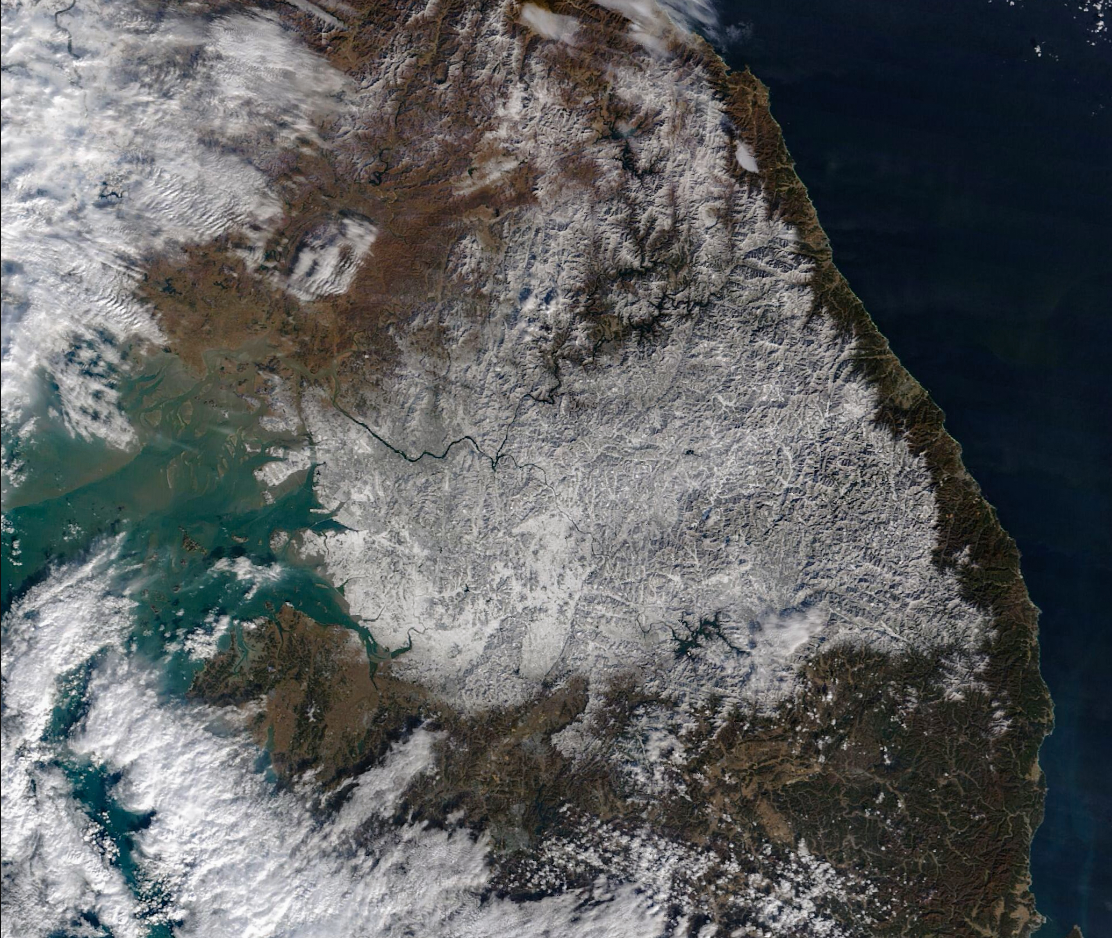
- A satellite image of the snowstorm taken on 29 November

Meteorological history
- Formed: 26 November 2024
- Dissipated: 29 November 2024

Snowstorm
- Max. snowfall: 47.5 cm (18.7 in) in Yongin

Overall effects
- Fatalities: 6
- Damage: Several multi-vehicle collisions and roof collapses
- Areas affected: South Korea
- Power outages: >230 homes in Seoul Capital Area

The 2024 South Korean snowstorm was a historic weather event that occurred between 26 and 28 November 2024, marking South Korea's most substantial November snowfall in 52 years and Seoul's heaviest snowfall since the beginning of record-keeping in 1907. The storm set several snowfall records across the nation, and caused widespread disruption to transportation and resulted in multiple casualties, including 6 fatalities.

== Meteorology ==
According to the Korea Meteorological Administration (KMA), the snowstorm, beginning on 26 November 2024, deposited 20–26 centimetres (7.9–10.2 in) of snow in northern Seoul and surrounding areas, with 16.1 centimeters (6.3 inches) falling on 27 November alone. This surpassed the previous daily November record set on November 28, 1972, when 12 centimeters of snow fell, representing the heaviest daily November snowfall since Seoul began keeping records in 1907. Eastern, central, and southwestern regions of the country receiving 10-28 centimeters of snow accumulation. The snowfall continued through 28 November, with areas like Yongin, south of Seoul, accumulating up to 47.5 centimeters (18.7 inches).

The KMA reported that the unprecedented snowfall resulted from specific meteorological conditions, which included a significantly larger temperature differential between cold air masses on land interacting with the warmer surface of the Yellow Sea, enhanced by unusually warm temperatures in preceding weeks. In addition, persistent westerly winds carried snow into the Seoul metropolitan area, which in tandem with snowfall patterns persisting over the same regions, led to increased accumulation around the area.

== Impact ==
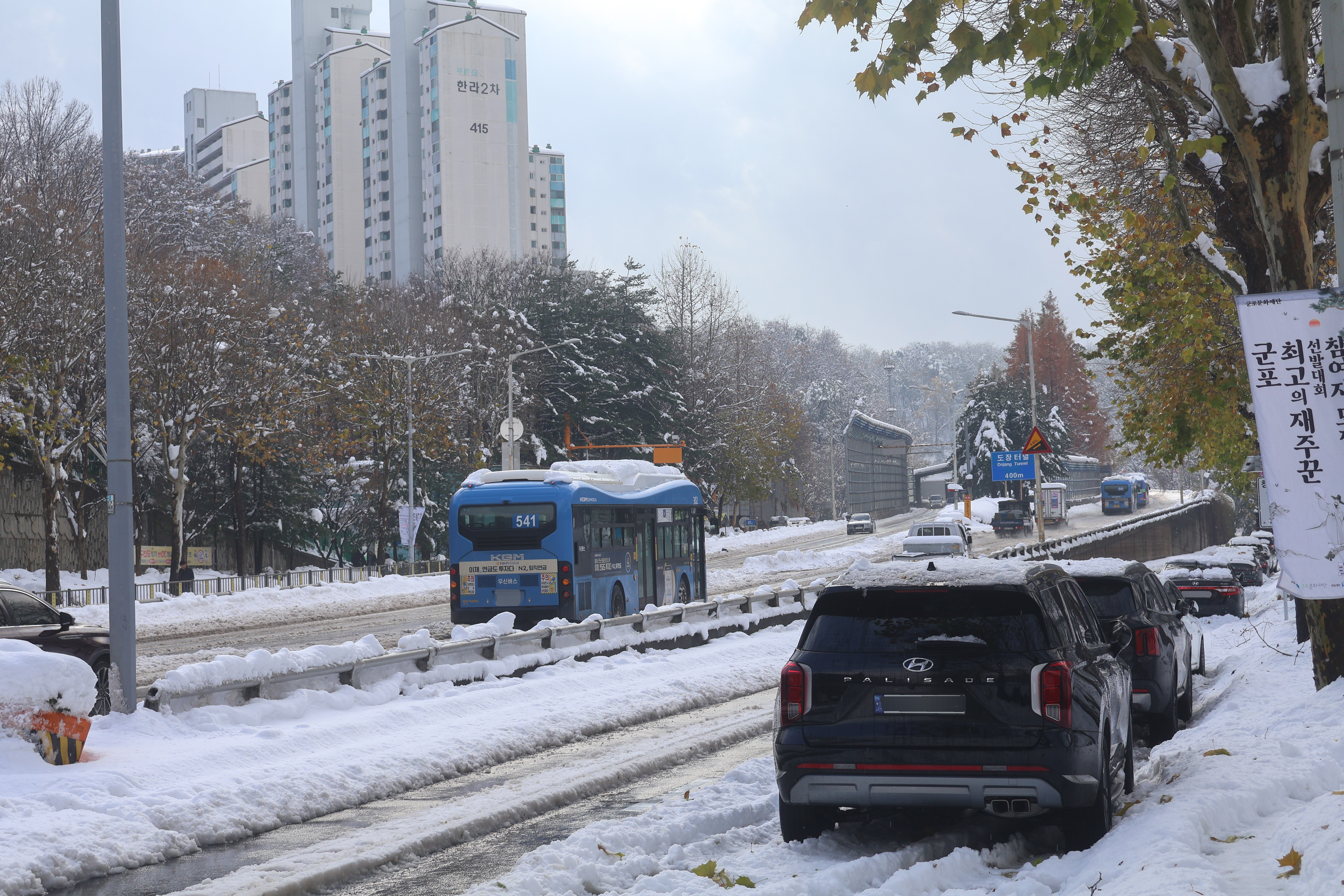
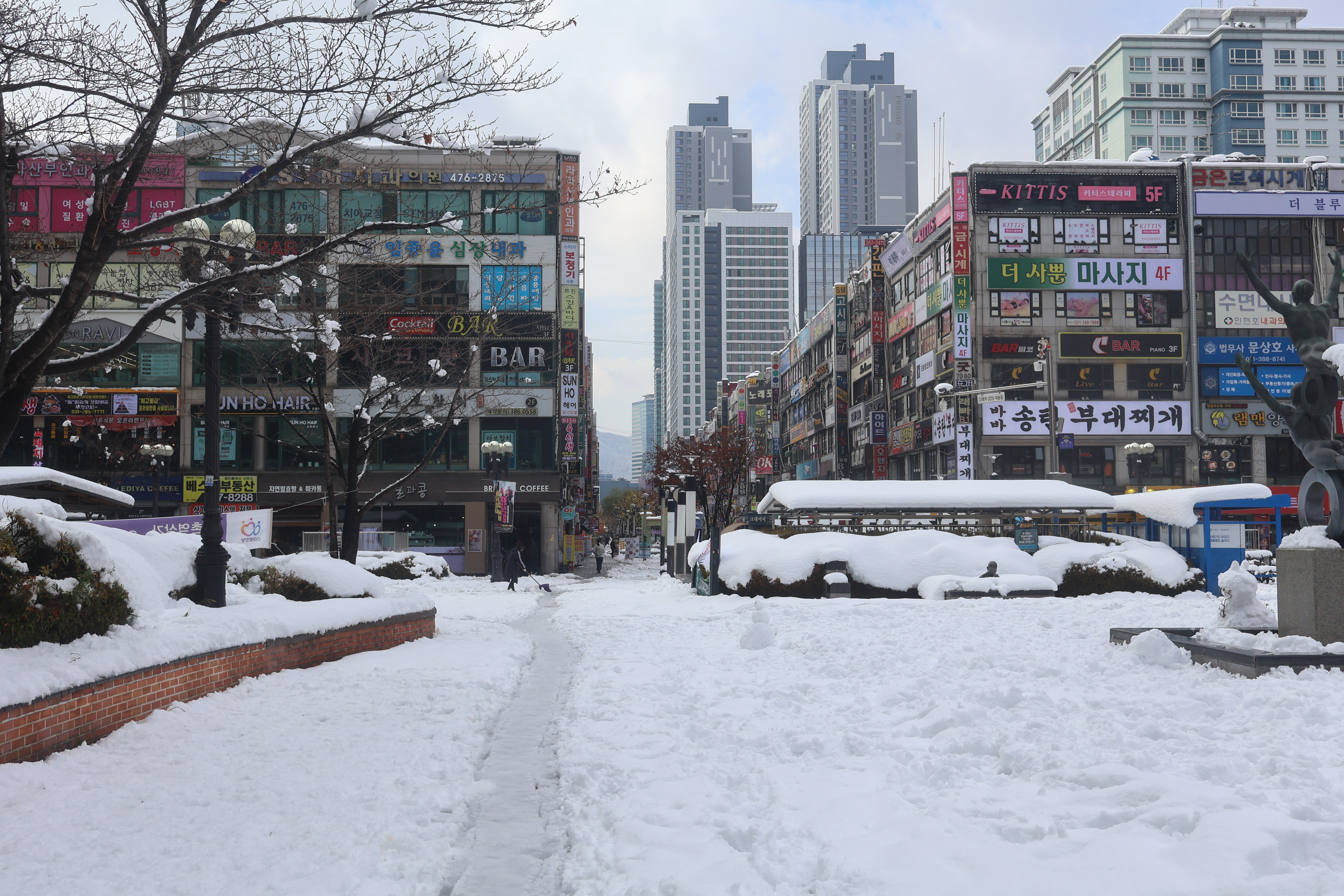
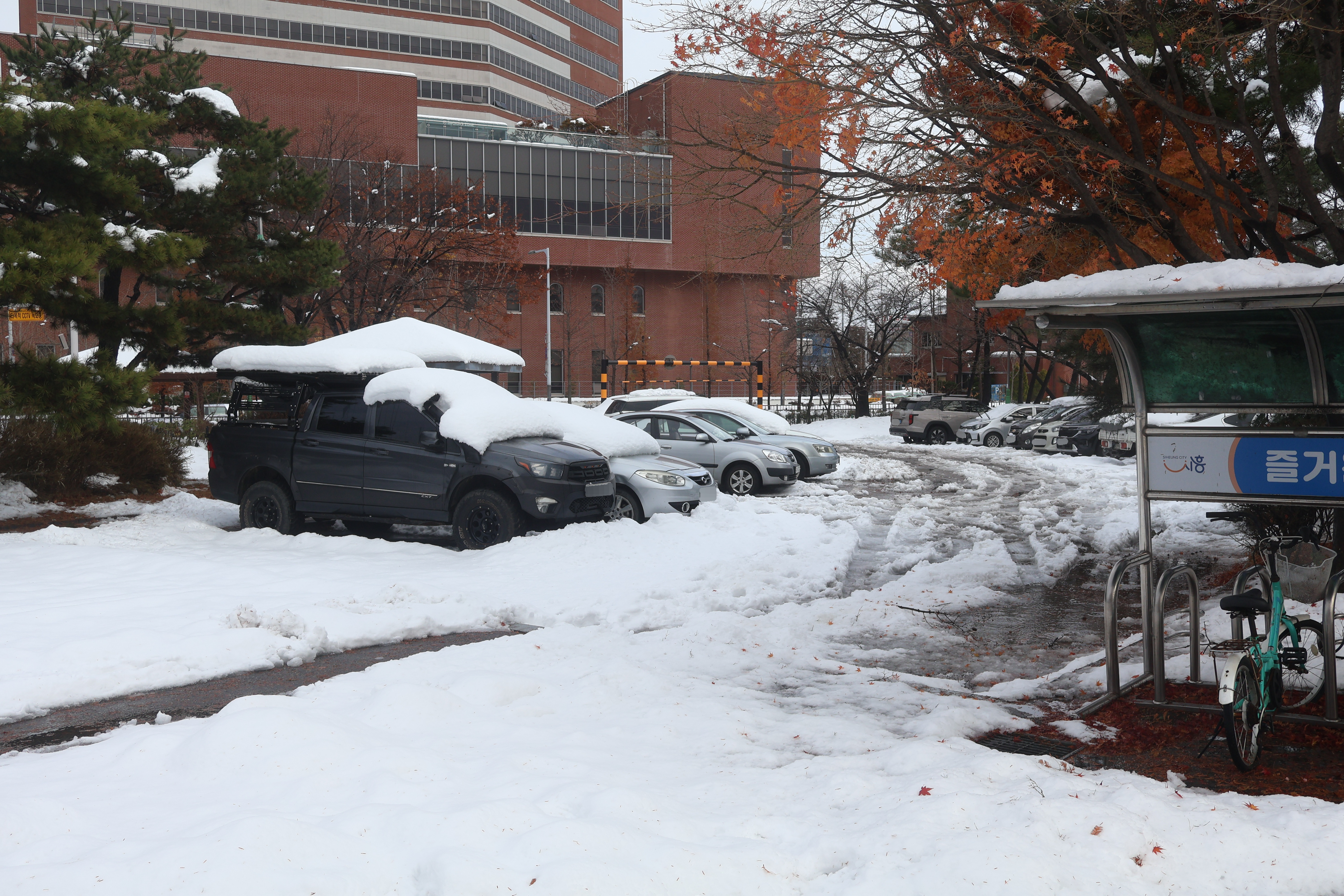

The storm caused power outages that impacted multiple cities surrounding Seoul, including 230 homes in Gwangju.

The storm significantly disrupted transportation systems across South Korea. Among these included 317 flights experiencing cancellation or delays at national airports including Incheon International Airport. Approximately ninety ferries were ordered to remain in port. Subway systems experienced overcrowding due to road conditions, with commuters in Seoul faced significant delays as a result. Hundreds of hiking trails were closed off. At least eighteen roads around Seoul were placed under weather-related restrictions due to snow coverage and fallen trees.

=== Casualties ===
At least six fatalities were attributed to the snowstorm in Gyeonggi Province. One fatality occurred in a five-vehicle traffic accident in Hongcheon, while four were caused due to structural collapses under snow weight, including one in Yangju when a tent garage collapsed during snow removal. A 53-vehicle collision occurred on a highway in Wonju caused 11 injuries.

== Response ==
The Korea Meteorological Administration (KMA) issued heavy snow warnings which advised restriction of vehicular operation, avoidance of outdoor activities, and caution regarding falling trees.

President Yoon Suk Yeol's administration implemented several measures, including the mobilization of emergency services towards impacted regions, directing authorities to monitor and enhance public transportation capacity, and initiating extensive road clearing operations. The Seoul Metropolitan Government mobilized over 11,000 personnel to monitor and respond to snowfall-related events, which included nearly 20,000 pieces of equipment being utilized for snow removal.

1,285 schools, including kindergartens, were indefinitely closed in Gyeonggi Province.

== See also ==
- Winter storms of 2009–10 in East Asia
- January 2016 East Asia cold wave
