= Cho Gyeong-mok =

South Korean politician (1937–2024)

- 조경목

Member of the National Assembly of South Korea
- In office 13 May 1985 – 29 May 1992

Personal details
- Born: 26 June 1937 Keijō, Korea, Empire of Japan
- Died: 15 September 2024 (aged 87)
- Party: DJP
- Education: Seoul National University; Victoria University of Wellington; Sogang University
- Occupation: Businessman

Cho Gyeong-mok (Korean: 조경목; 26 June 1937 – 15 September 2024) was a South Korean businessman and politician. A member of the Democratic Justice Party, he served in the National Assembly from 1985 to 1992.

Cho died on 15 September 2024, at the age of 87.
