= Hwaseong battery factory fire =

2024 explosion and fire at South Korean factory

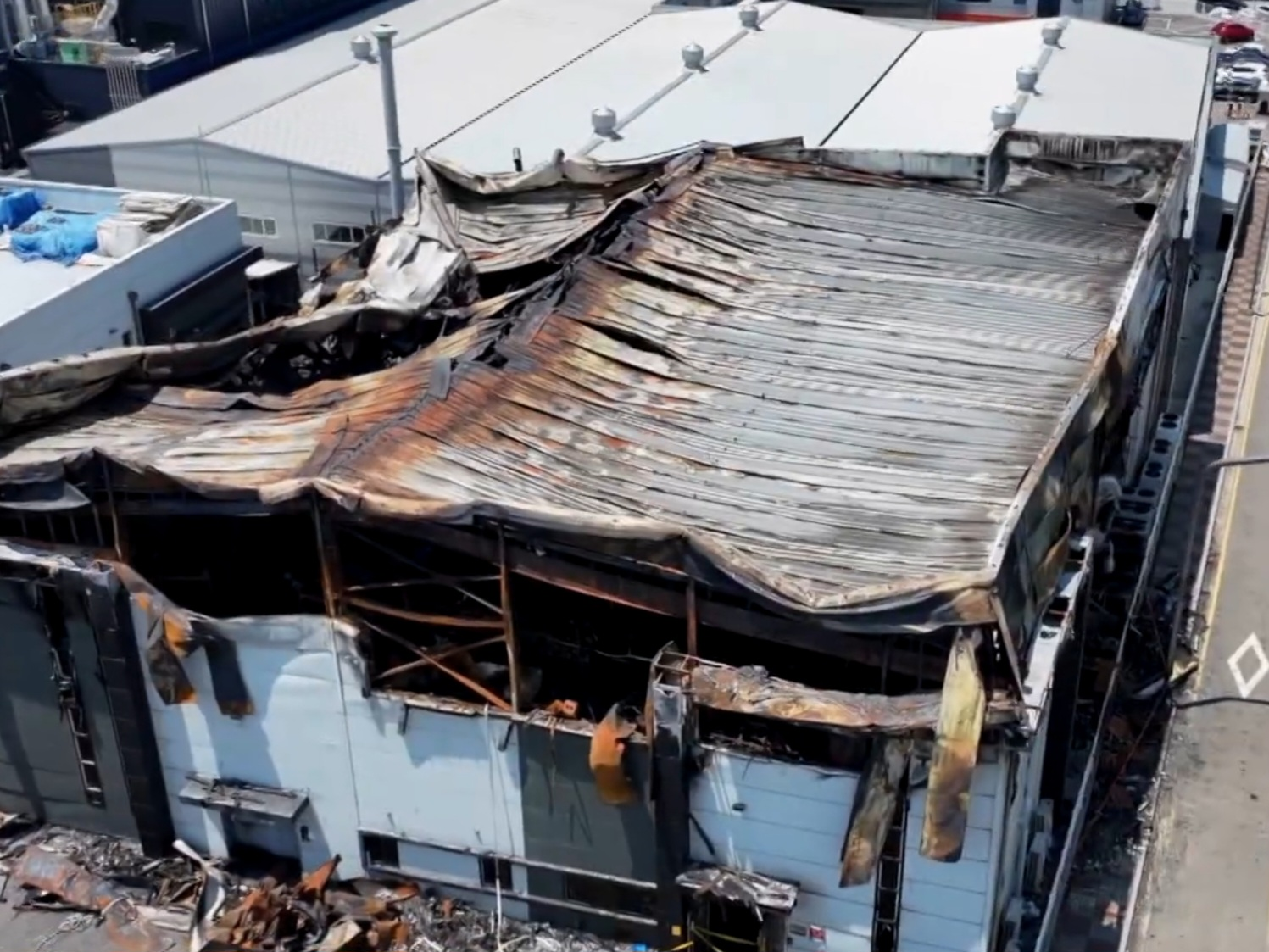
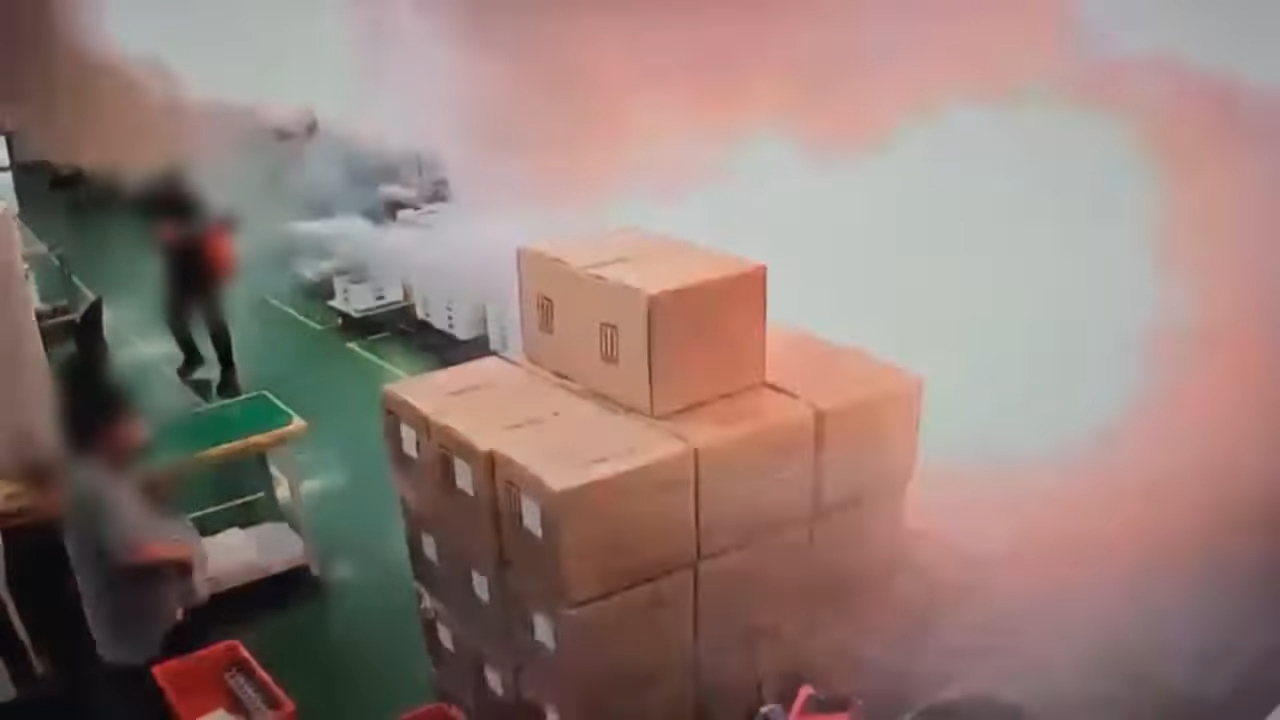
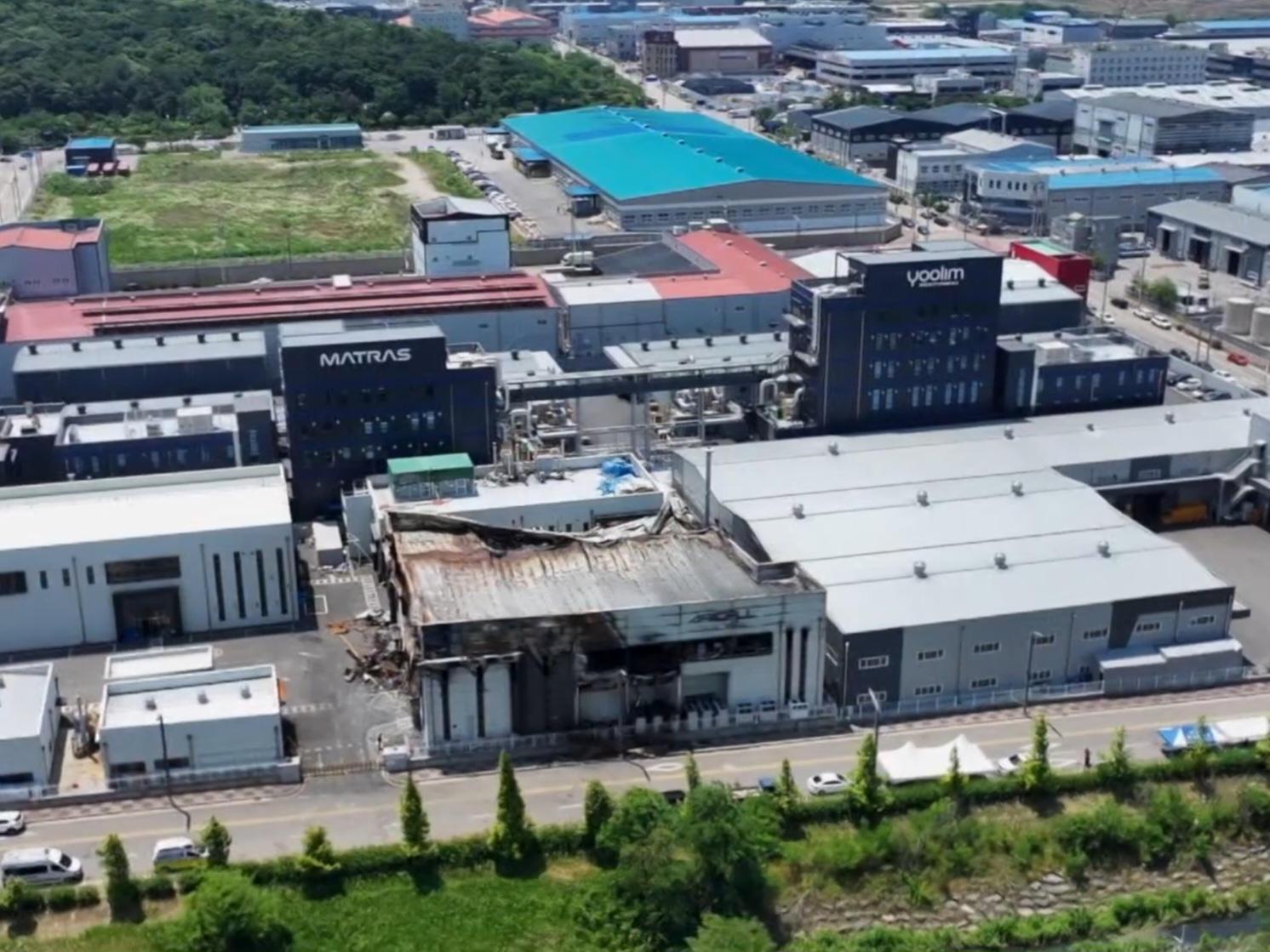
- From top, left to right: Factory burned down after fire • CCTV image showing the fire • Around the factory
- Native name: 화성 전지 제조공장 화재 사고
- Date: 24 June 2024
- Time: 10:31 a.m.–3:10 p.m. (KST)
- Duration: approx. five hours
- Location: Hwaseong, Gyeonggi, South Korea; 37°11′20″N 126°40′39″E
- Deaths: 23
- Injuries: 8

On 24 June 2024, in Hwaseong, South Korea, a lithium battery factory owned by Aricell caught on fire after several batteries exploded. The fire killed 23 workers and wounded eight more, mostly Chinese nationals.

== Background ==
Aricell manufactures non-rechargeable lithium-thionyl chloride batteries. A 1986 Jet Propulsion Laboratory study titled Safety Considerations of Lithium-Thionyl Chloride Cells noted that "safety hazards have ranged from mild venting of toxic materials to violent explosions and fires."

== Explosions ==
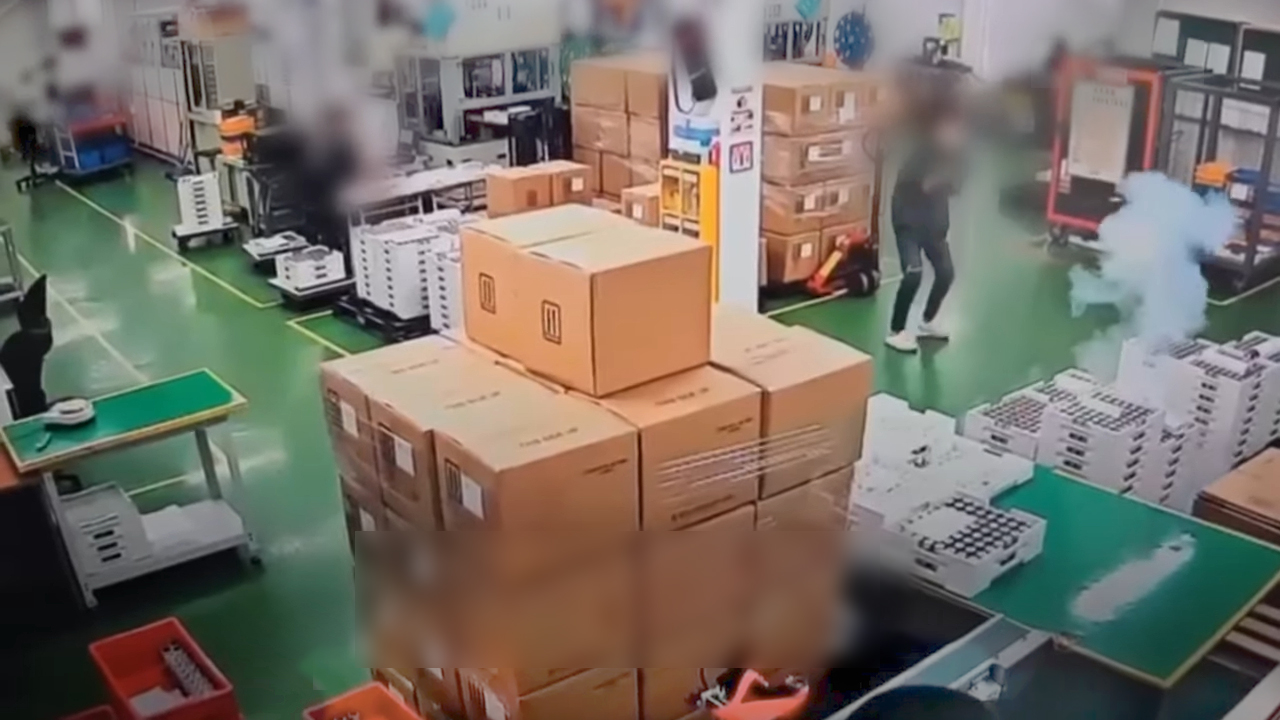
CCTV image showing the moment the fire starts

External videos
- CCTV footage showing the moment the fire starts, released by the Yonhap News Agency

Starting at 10:31 a.m. KST on 24 June 2024, a series of explosions occurred at a warehouse in a battery plant which contained over 35,000 batteries. The fire started at a workstation on the second floor. The batteries contained many flammable components such as lithium, causing the fire to spread rapidly. Large clouds of white smoke were present throughout, with numerous explosions occurring. About 100 people were working at the warehouse at the time of the initial explosion. Many sections of the roof collapsed due to the fires, and large sections of concrete were scattered around nearby streets due to the force of the explosions.

About 145 personnel and 50 units of firefighting and rescue equipment were deployed to the scene. The fire caused by the explosions was extinguished about five hours after the initial explosion, at 3:10 p.m. KST.

== Casualties ==
Seventeen Chinese workers, five South Koreans and one Laotian were among the dead; they were identified as seventeen women and six men. Gyeonggi Province fire official Cho Sun-ho reported that most of the workers were temporary employees who likely were not familiar with the floor plan. He said that the workers died of smoke inhalation instead of burn injuries. The fire started on the second floor and spread to the workers' location where they likely took one to two breaths before succumbing to the toxic battery smoke within 15 seconds.

Due to the intensity of the fire, it was difficult to immediately identify the dead. Missing people were discovered by geolocating their mobile phone signals to the second floor. Officials noted that the dead workers likely could not escape using stairs to the ground. Twenty-two bodies were retrieved, while one victim subsequently died in a hospital.

Eight people were injured, two with second-degree burns.

== Investigation ==
Three company officials are under investigation on suspicion of violating industrial safety laws. On 28 August, Aricell CEO Park Soon-kwan was arrested after a warrant was issued against him over the disaster by a court in Suwon. His son, who is also an Aricell executive, was also ordered arrested.

On 23 September 2025, the Suwon District Court sentenced Park Soon-kwan to 15 years' imprisonment for violating the Serious Accidents Punishment Act and the Occupational Safety and Health Act. It also sentenced Park's son, who was a general manager of Aricell, to 15 years imprisonment and a 1 million-won fine for violating the Occupational Safety and Health Act and occupational negligence resulting in death or injury. On 20 October 2026, the Supreme Court sentenced Park Soon-kwan to 4 years in the final judgment. Park's son, Park Joong-un, also was sentenced to 7 years and fined 1 million won. The court also upheld 800 million yuan fine against Aricell.

== Response ==
Government officials, including the Chinese ambassador to South Korea Xing Haiming and South Korean President Yoon Suk Yeol, came to the site later that day and expressed their condolences to the victims. Yoon also ordered a full investigation into the causes of the fire.

Aricell CEO Park Soon-kwan apologized and expressed his condolences to those affected by the fire on the following day. Park also stated that he would provide support and will cooperate fully with the investigation.
