= Nam Ki-shim =

South Korean linguist (born 1936)

- 남기심
- Born: 1936 (age 89–90); Gwangju, Gyeonggi Province, South Korea
- Education: Yonsei University (B.A. in Korean language and literature) Yonsei University (M.A. in Korean linguistics) University of Washington (M.A. in linguistics) Yonsei University (PhD in Korean linguistics)
- Occupations: Professor of Korean linguistics, Korean linguist

Nam Ki-shim (Korean: 남기심; Hanja: 南基心; Korean pronunciation: [nam.gi.ɕim], born 1936) is a professor and scholar of Korean linguistics from South Korea.

Throughout his career, Nam contributed to developing the field of Korean linguistics, and his major works include Standard Korean Grammar (표준국어문법론, 1985) and The Modern Korean Syntax (현대 국어 통사론, 2001). He helped to introduce the concept of "Corpus Linguistics" to South Korea and compiled the Yonsei Korean Dictionary (연세한국어사전, 1998) when he served as a professor at Yonsei University. Additionally, he made efforts to promote the proper use of the Korean language in legal texts while in the role of the Director General of the National Institute of Korean Language.

== Life ==
Ki-shim Nam was born in Gwangju, Korea, Empire of Japan in 1936. He graduated with a BA in Korean language and literature from Yonsei University in February 1960. He received his MA in Korean linguistics from Yonsei University with his thesis The research on Korean tense: [-deo-] in the 15th-century Korean language and its contrasting form(s) (국어의 시제연구: 15세기 국어의 [-더-]와 그 대립형 중심) in 1962. He continued his education and obtained another MA in linguistics from the University of Washington in 1967. Once completing his second MA, he returned to Yonsei University, where he earned his Ph.D. in Korean linguistics with his dissertation The grammar of undeformed sentential complement constructions in Korean (국어 완형 보문법 연구) in 1973.

== Career ==
Ki-shim Nam served as a professor in the Department of Korean Language and Literature at Keimyung University from September 1967 until February 1977. He then joined Yonsei University's College of Liberal Arts as a professor, a position he held from March 1977 to August 2001. From January 2001 to January 2006, Nam was the Director General of the National Institute of Korean Language. He also held the role of Chairperson for the Korean Language Deliberation Council and the Language Norms Division at the Ministry of Culture from September 2009 to September 2011. Since March 2006, he has been a Special Researcher at the Yonsei Institute of Language & Information Studies, and from September 2012 to December 2017, he was a Professor Emeritus at the Cyber University of Korea.

=== Introduction of Corpus Linguistics and Construction of "Yonsei Corpus" ===
Nam was instrumental in introducing corpus linguistics to South Korea. At Yonsei University, he collaborated with colleagues to create the "Yonsei Corpus 1," the nation's first corpus. The project began in 1986 alongside the establishment of the Committee of Korean Lexicography, now known as the Yonsei Institute of Language & Information Studies. The construction of the Yonsei Corpus 1 commenced in 1988, focusing on selecting language samples for inclusion. This corpus aimed to inform the creation of a dictionary based on word frequency, culminating in the publication of the Yonsei Korean Dictionary in 1998.

Despite its pioneering status, Yonsei Corpus 1 faced challenges due to the nascent state of corpus linguistics research in Korea at the time. The corpus eventually expanded beyond its initial scope, complicating the maintenance of the intended text genre proportions.

=== Compilation and Publication of the Yonsei Korean Dictionary ===
The rapid development of South Korea in the 1960s and subsequent changes in the Korean language highlighted the limitations of existing dictionaries and the need for a new dictionary, particularly for foreign learners of Korean. Nam and his colleagues at Yonsei University formed the Yonsei Korean Dictionary Compilation Committee and began compiling the Yonsei Korean Dictionary, which was published in 1998. The dictionary's development was supported by the construction of the Yonsei Corpus 1, which provided a database for analyzing word usage and definitions. The completion of the dictionary marked a significant achievement in the integration of corpus linguistics and lexicography.

During the compilation process, Nam and his colleagues realized that the construction of a large computerized corpus was essential for the new dictionary. They first built "Yonsei Corpus 1" and analyzed the examples of each word in this corpus to obtain accurate word definitions. In 1998, the Yonsei Korean Dictionary was finally completed and achieved the interdisciplinary convergence of corpus linguistics and lexicography.

The Yonsei Korean Dictionary received various evaluations from linguists. Some linguists say that its significance is great in that it is the first Korean dictionary based on vocabulary frequency in a corpus and provides definitions that anyone could understand. On the other hand, others point out the dictionary's limitations. One criticism is that the dictionary lacks consistency in the use of grammatical terms. Another criticism is that the dictionary does not provide the importance level of each vocabulary for non-native speakers.

=== Publication of Modern Korean Syntax ===
Ki-shim Nam pioneered the field of Korean syntax and strove for the advancement of Korean syntax. When Korean grammar remained in the stages of morphology, he introduced syntax to the field of Korean linguistics. His published a book titled Modern Korean Syntax (현대국어통사론, 2001) to expand the scope of Korean grammar. The book is systematically divided into nine chapters: 1) Korean and Grammar, 2) Scope of Syntax, 3) Sentence Formation and Sentence Constituents, 4) Korean Special Constructions, 5) Characteristics of Korean Syntax, 6) Embedded Sentences, 7) Connected Sentences, 8) Active and Passive voice, and 9) Negation.

Modern Korean Syntax was translated into English by Sun-Hee Lee and Allison Blodgett, under the leadership of the Korean Publishers Association (대한 출판 문화 협회), a government-affiliated organization. In 2005, it was exhibited in the Guest of Honor section of Frankfurt Book Fair. The Frankfurt Book Fair chooses a country or region as "Guest of Honor" every year, and the selected Guest of Honor is given an opportunity to highlight its literature, culture, and artistic contributions, and it is provided with a platform to present its authors, books, and cultural heritage to a global audience. When South Korea is selected as a "Guest of Honor" of 2005, the Korean organizing committee for the book fair selected 100 Korean-language books, and Modern Korean Syntax was one of these books. Additionally, the book has been used as a textbook for Korean Language Syntax in universities around the world, including the United States, Canada, the United Kingdom, and other countries.

=== North-South Joint International Academic Conference: North-South Dialect Collection Project ===
From 2001 to 2006, Ki-shim Nam worked as the Director General of the National Institute of Korean Language. During his tenure, he conducted research on the dialects of South and North Korea to preserve the Korean language in the Korean Peninsula and made efforts to promote language exchange between the two regions.

He organized several North-South Joint Academic Conferences from 2001 to 2005. South and North Korea annually engaged in scholarly exchanges through the North-South Joint Academic Conferences, focusing on the theme of restoring linguistic homogeneity between the two. More specifically, during the 3rd North-South International Academic Conference held in Beijing, China, in November 2003, Nam reached an agreement with the head of the Language Research Institute of Academy of Social Sciences (사회과학원 언어학연구소) in North Korea, Young-ho Moon (문영호) on the implementation of the "North-South Korean Dialect Research Project".

The project's goal was to investigate and transcribe Korean dialects used in various regions within South Korea and abroad and build a sound database for each dialect. To achieve this goal, Nam and the researchers of National Institute of Korean Language created the Regional Language Research Questions (지역어 조사 질문지, 2006) consisting of questions that covered vocabulary, grammar, sentences, and discourse in the Korean language. Using this questionnaire as a basis, they transcribed the regional languages, conducted research on dialects in various regions, and published audio files of regional language recordings.

=== Legal Text Simplification Agreement ===
On March 27, 2002, while working as the Director General of the National Institute of Korean Language, Ki-shim Nam entered into the "Legal Text Simplification Agreement" (법령문 순화 협정) with the Ministry of Justice. This agreement aimed to simplify complex language used in law in South Korea and make it more understandable to the public. Legal texts contain multiple grammatical errors, unnatural expressions, ambiguous sentences, and a lack of coherence between sentence elements, making it challenging to correctly comprehend and apply the law. To overcome those issues, Nam collaborated with the Ministry of Justice by providing advice in the terminology of newly legislated laws, making legal language more accessible to the public.

== Publications ==
- Yonsei Korean Dictionary (연세한국어사전, 1998) ISBN 890007248X
- Standard Korean Grammar (표준국어문법론, 1985)
- Standard Korean Grammar: Revised version (표준국어문법론 개정판, 1993) ISBN 8934200162
- Standard Korean Grammar: 3th edition (표준국어문법론 제3판, 2011) ISBN 9788934201137
- Standard Korean Grammar: 4th edition (표준국어문법론 제4판, 2014) ISBN 9788962925678
- Standard Korean Grammar: Completely Revised Version (표준국어문법론 전면개정판, 2019) ISBN 9788968177231
- Introduction to Linguistics (언어학개론, 1977)
- Korean Syntax-Semantics (국어의 통사-의미론, 1986)
- Research in Lexicography (사전편찬학연구, 1988)
- Research in Korean Grammar 1: Issues of Korean Syntax (국어 문법의 탐구1: 국어 통사론의 문제, 1996) ISBN 897626181X
- Research in Korean Grammar 2: General Issues of Korean Grammar (국어 문법의 탐구2: 국어 문법 일반의 문제, 1996) ISBN 8976261828
- Research in Korean Grammar 3: Issues and Prospects of Korean Syntax (국어 문법의 탐구3: 국어 통사론의 문제와 전망, 1996) ISBN 8976261836
- Research in Korean Grammar 4: Revisited Issues in Korean Grammar (국어 문법의 탐구4: 되짚어본 국어문법의 문제들, 1998) ISBN 8976263200
- Research in Korean Grammar 5: Celebration on Professor Nam-gok Ki-shim Nam Retirement (국어 문법의 탐구5: 남곡 남기심 교수 정년 퇴임 기념, 2001) ISBN 897626701X
- The Modern Korean Syntax (현대 국어 통사론, 2001) ISBN 8976266927

== Awards ==
- 1999 20th Oesol Prize for Academic Excellence 제20회 외솔상 학술부문
- 2002 43th Samil Prize for Academic Excellence in the category of Humanities 제43회 삼일(3.1) 문화상 학술상
- 2005 Jang Gibeom Award in Korean Announcer Competition 한국아나운서대회 장기범상
- 2011 Bogwan Order of Cultural Merit 보관문화훈장(寶冠文化勳章)
- 2012 18th Yongjae Academic Award 제18회 용재 학술상
- 2014 12th Ilsuk Korean Linguistic Award 제12회일석국어학상(一石國語學賞)
- 2018 Ju Si-gyeong Academic Award 주시경 학술상
