= Korea Medical Association =

South Korean trade union

Korean Medical Association
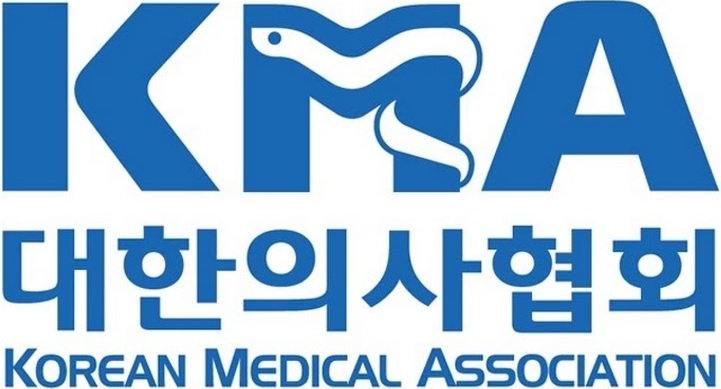
- Location: South Korea

Korean name
- Hangul: 대한의사협회
- Hanja: 大韓醫師協會
- RR: Daehan uisa hyeophoe
- MR: Taehan ŭisa hyŏphoe

The Korean Medical Association (KMA; Korean: 대한의사협회) is a trade union in South Korea. It claims to represent 101,618 of the country's doctors.

In June 2000, the Association organised an indefinite strike in protest of government health reforms. On March 10th, 2014 it organised a one-day strike in opposition to the government's plans to introduce telemedicine and against medical regulations they claimed infringed upon physicians' professional autonomy. In August 2020, in the midst of the COVID-19 pandemic with cases increasing in Korea, the Association organised a 3-day strike and its Korean Intern and Resident Association indefinite strike in protest of the government's plan to increase the number of doctors over the next decade rejecting the government's return-to-work order. From February 1st 2024 it is organizing massive protests against the government's plan to increase medical school students.

The Association publishes the Journal of the Korean Medical Association. Volume 60 was published in March 2017.
