= Choi Gwang-ryul =

South Korean judge (1936–2024)

- 최광률

Justice of the Constitutional Court of Korea
- In office 15 September 1988 – 14 September 1994
- Preceded by: position established
- Succeeded by: Kim Chin-woo

Personal details
- Born: 1 August 1936 Taedong County, Japanese Korea (now North Korea)
- Died: 28 September 2024 (aged 88)
- Occupation: Lawyer; Judge

Choi Gwang-ryul (Korean: 최광률; 1 August 1936 – 28 September 2024) was a South Korean lawyer and judge. He served as a justice of the Constitutional Court from 1988 to 1994.

Choi died from a chronic illness on 28 September 2024, at the age of 88.

== Early life ==
Choi Gwang-ryol was born in 1936 in South Pyongan Province and passed the Supreme Judicial Service Examination in 1958,He served as a judge prosecutor in the Air Force before serving for six years as a judge in the Daejeon District Court, Seoul District Court , and Seoul District Criminal Court,He then opened a law office in 1969, but was appointed a constitutional , judge in the Constitutional , Court established by the constitutional amendment in 1988,After retiring as a constitutional judge in 1994, he became the chief lawyer of the Dongyang Joint Law Firm. With the exception of Li Yu-jung, who had only two years of experience,,As a prosecutor who failed to pass the National Assembly confirmation hearing, Choi Gwang-ryul is the constitutional , judge,,He has the shortest experience as a judge and public prosecutor and is well versed in administrative law, having served as President of the Administrative Cases Law Research Association.

On June 3, 1969, while serving as a judge at the Seoul Criminal Court, he ruled the Grain Management Act unconstitutional on the grounds that "wholesale grain merchants,They must be registered with the Agricultural Cooperative Auction House and the government sets the advertised price,And that Public Notice No. 1898 issued by the Ministry of Agriculture and Forestry based on Articles 17 and 27 of the Grain Management Act,"He exceeded the limits of the principle of legitimacy and delegated legislation," and acquitted him of this point,He was fined only 50,000 won for violating the measurement , law.
