= Jeong Hui-gyeong =

South Korean politician (1932–2024)

- 정희경

Member of the National Assembly of South Korea
- In office 30 May 1996 – 29 May 2000

Personal details
- Born: 24 May 1932 Keijō, Korea, Empire of Japan
- Died: 5 October 2024 (aged 92)
- Party: NCNP
- Education: Seoul National University; Kansas State University
- Occupation: Academic

Jeong Hui-gyeong (Korean: 정희경; 24 May 1932 – 5 October 2024) was a South Korean academic and politician. A member of the National Congress for New Politics, she served in the National Assembly from 1996 to 2000.

Jeong died on 5 October 2024, at the age of 92.
