= Jeong Jae-mun =

South Korean politician (1936–2024)

- 정재문

Member of the National Assembly of South Korea for Busanjin-gu Gap
- In office 13 May 1985 – 29 May 2004
- Preceded by: constituency established
- Succeeded by: Kim Byeong-ho
- Constituency: Proportional representation (1985–1988); Busanjin-gu Gap (1988–2004)

Personal details
- Born: 31 October 1936 Fuzan, Korea, Empire of Japan
- Died: 11 September 2024 (aged 87)
- Party: NKDP; RDP; NKP; GNP
- Education: University of California, Berkeley
- Occupation: Political scientist

Jeong Jae-mun (Korean: 정재문; 31 October 1936 – 11 September 2024) was a South Korean political scientist and politician. A member of the New Korean Democratic Party, the Reunification Democratic Party, and the Grand National Party, he served in the National Assembly from 1985 to 2004.

Jeong died on 11 September 2024, at the age of 87.
