= Nam Jae-hui =

South Korean politician (1934–2024)

- 남재희

Minister of Labor
- In office 22 December 1993 – 23 December 1994
- Preceded by: Lee In-je
- Succeeded by: Lee Hyeong-gu

Member of the National Assembly of South Korea
- In office 17 March 1979 – 29 May 1992
- Constituency: Gangseo-gu (1979–1988); Gangseo B

Personal details
- Born: 18 January 1934 Cheongju, Korea, Empire of Japan
- Died: 15 September 2024 (aged 90)
- Party: DRP; DJP
- Education: Seoul National University
- Occupation: Journalist

Nam Jae-hui (Korean: 남재희; 18 January 1934 – 15 September 2024) was a South Korean journalist and politician. A member of the Democratic Republican Party and the Democratic Justice Party, he served in the National Assembly from 1979 to 1992 and was Minister of Labor from 1993 to 1994.

Nam died on 15 September 2024, at the age of 90.
