= Lee Jong-seok =

- Hangul: 이종석
- RR: I Jongseok
- MR: I Chongsŏk

Lee Jong-seok may refer to:

- Lee Jong-seok (politician) (born 1958): former South Korean Minister of Unification
- Lee Jong-seok (judge) (born 1961): 8th President of the Constitutional Court of Korea
- Lee Jong-suk (born 1989): a South Korean actor and model
