= Lee Jong-seok (judge) =

8th President of the Constitutional Court of Korea

Honorable Lee Jong-seok
- 이종석
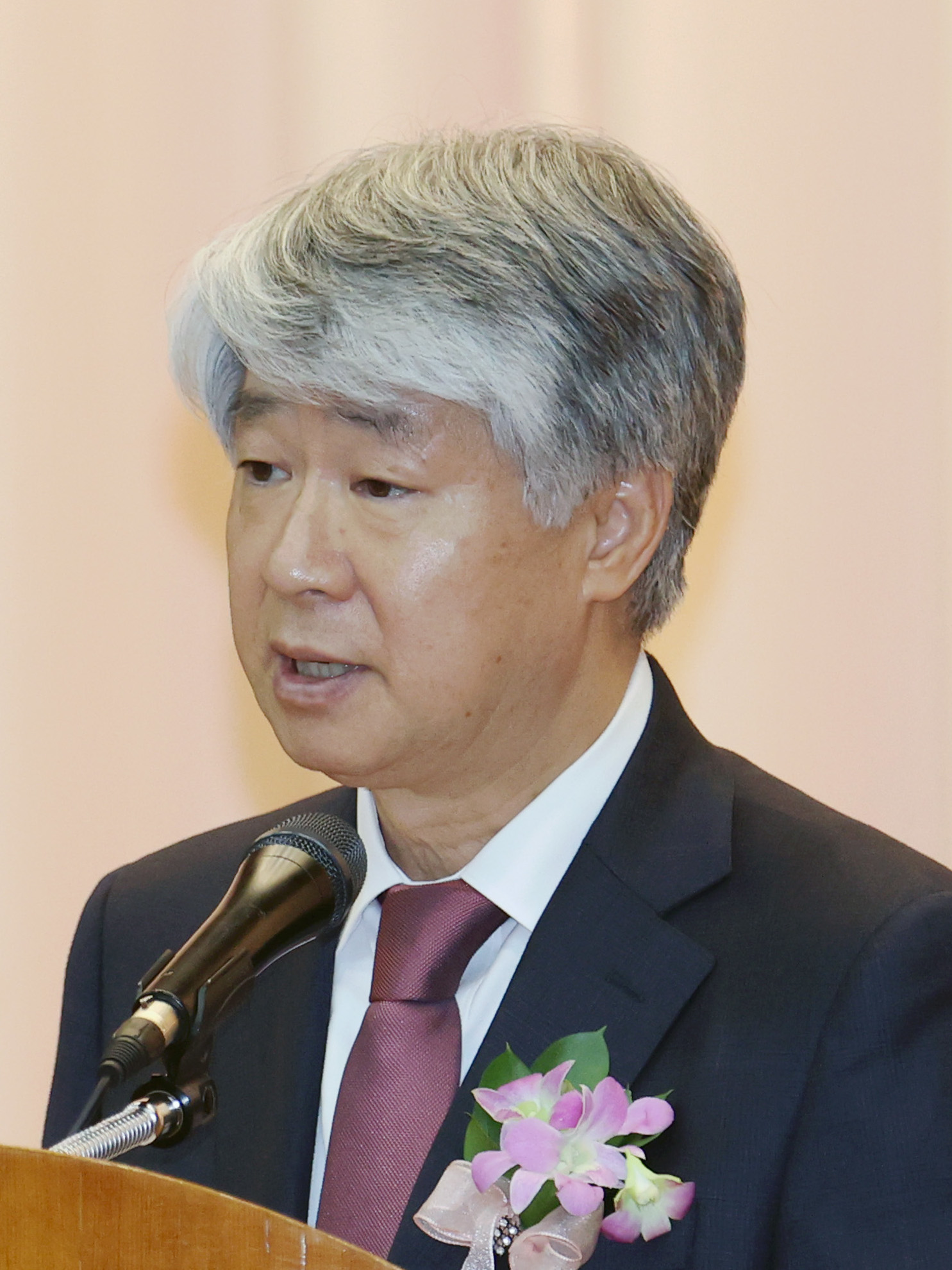
- Lee in 2024

8th President of the Constitutional Court of Korea
- In office 30 November 2023 – 17 October 2024
- Appointed by: Yoon Suk Yeol
- Preceded by: Yoo Nam-seok; Lee Eunae (acting)
- Succeeded by: Moon Hyungbae (acting); Kim Hyungdu (acting); Kim Sang-hwan

Justice of the Constitutional Court of Korea
- In office 18 October 2018 – 17 October 2024
- Nominated by: Liberty Korea Party
- Appointed by: Moon Jae-in
- Preceded by: Ahn Chang-ho

Personal details
- Born: 21 February 1961 (age 65) Chilgok, South Korea
- Education: Seoul National University School of Law (LL.B.)
- Occupation: Judge

Military service
- Allegiance: Republic of Korea
- Branch/service: Republic of Korea Army
- Years of service: 1986–1989
- Rank: First lieutenant (Judge advocate)

Lee Jong-seok (Korean: 이종석; Hanja: 李悰錫 born 21 February 1961) is a South Korean jurist who served as the eighth President of the Constitutional Court of Korea from November 2023 to October 2024. He also served as a justice of the Constitutional Court from 2018 to 2024.

== Life and career ==
Lee was born on 21 February 1961 in Chilgok, South Korea. He graduated Kyeongbuk High School and Seoul National University School of Law, passed the 25th National bar exam, and completed the 15th Judicial Research and Training Institute program. He started his legal career as trial court judge at Incheon District Court in 1989 after discharging from mandatory military service as judge advocate. During almost thirty years of his public service as lower ordinary court judge, he was renowned for his expertise in affairs of court administration and bankruptcy litigation.

Lee was nominated for Justice of the Constitutional Court of Korea in 2018, by Liberty Korea Party, which was the major conservative party in South Korea. Following approval of the nomination in National Assembly, President Moon Jae-in appointed him as a Constitutional Court justice in October 2018.

As one of nine Justices in the Constitutional Court of Korea, Lee was famous for his conservative views, including against the decriminalization of abortion. This characteristic led President Yoon Suk Yeol to nominate him as candidate for President of the Constitutional Court of Korea, as the successor of retiring seventh Constitutional Court president Yoo Nam-seok.

He retired on 17 October 2024, along with justices Lee Youngjin and Kim Kiyoung, upon the completion of their six-year terms, leading the Constitutional Court to only have six members (with seven being required for a quorum). The gridlock lasted for almost three months until the appointments of Cho Hanchang and Chung Kyesun on 1 January 2025.

== See also ==
- Constitutional Court of Korea
- President of the Constitutional Court of Korea

Legal offices
Preceded by Ahn Chang-ho	Justice of the Constitutional Court of Korea; 2018–2024	Succeeded by Cho Hanchang
Preceded by Yoo Nam-seok; Lee Eunae (acting)	President of the Constitutional Court of Korea; 2023–2024	Succeeded by Moon Hyungbae (acting); Kim Hyungdu (acting); Kim Sanghwan
