= Kim Sanghwan =

9th President of the Constitutional Court of Korea

Honorable Kim Sanghwan
- 김상환
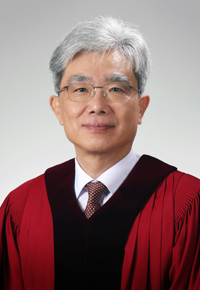
- Official portrait, 2025

9th President of the Constitutional Court of Korea
- Incumbent
- Assumed office 24 July 2025
- Appointed by: Lee Jae Myung
- Preceded by: Lee Jong-seok; Moon Hyungbae (acting); Kim Hyungdu (acting)

Justice of the Constitutional Court of Korea
- Incumbent
- Assumed office 24 July 2025
- Appointed by: Lee Jae Myung
- Preceded by: Moon Hyungbae

Associate Justice of the Supreme Court of Korea
- In office 28 December 2018 – 27 December 2024
- Nominated by: Kim Myeong-su
- Appointed by: Moon Jae-in

Personal details
- Born: 27 January 1966 (age 60) Daejeon, South Korea
- Education: Seoul National University School of Law (LL.B.)
- Occupation: Judge

Military service
- Branch/service: Republic of Korea Army
- Years of service: 1991–1994
- Rank: First lieutenant (Judge advocate)

Kim Sanghwan (Korean: 김상환; Hanja: 金尙煥, born 27 January 1966) is a South Korean jurist who has served since 2025 as the 9th president of the Constitutional Court of Korea. He has been described as progressive bloc of the Constitutional Court.

== Early life ==
Born 27 January 1966 in Daejeon, Kim was educated at Bomoon High School and studied law at Seoul National University. He passed national entrance test for the Judicial Research and Training Institute in 1988. After graduating 2 years of JRTI training course, Kim served his active duty in army for 3 years and discharged as first lieutenant.

== Career ==
Kim started his legal career as judge at the Busan District Court in 1994. He was seconded twice to the Constitutional Court as rapporteur judge for 4 total years during his mid years of career as lower ordinary court judge. In his later career as judge, Kim gained chance to serve as associate justice for the Supreme Court of Korea from 2018, and retired in 2024. Kim then started his short academic career as chaired professor in law school of the Jeju National University.

In 2025, president of the republic Lee Jae Myung nominated Kim to court president (chief justice) of the Constitutional Court. The National Assembly confirmed him by vote of 206–49.

== See also ==
- Constitutional Court of Korea
- President of the Constitutional Court of Korea

== Notes ==
Legal offices
Preceded by Moon Hyungbae	Justice of the Constitutional Court of Korea; 2025–present	Incumbent
Preceded by Lee Jong-seok; Moon Hyungbae (acting); Kim Hyungdu (acting)	President of the Constitutional Court of Korea; 2025–present	Incumbent
