= Cheong Hyungsik =

South Korean judge (born 1961)

- 정형식
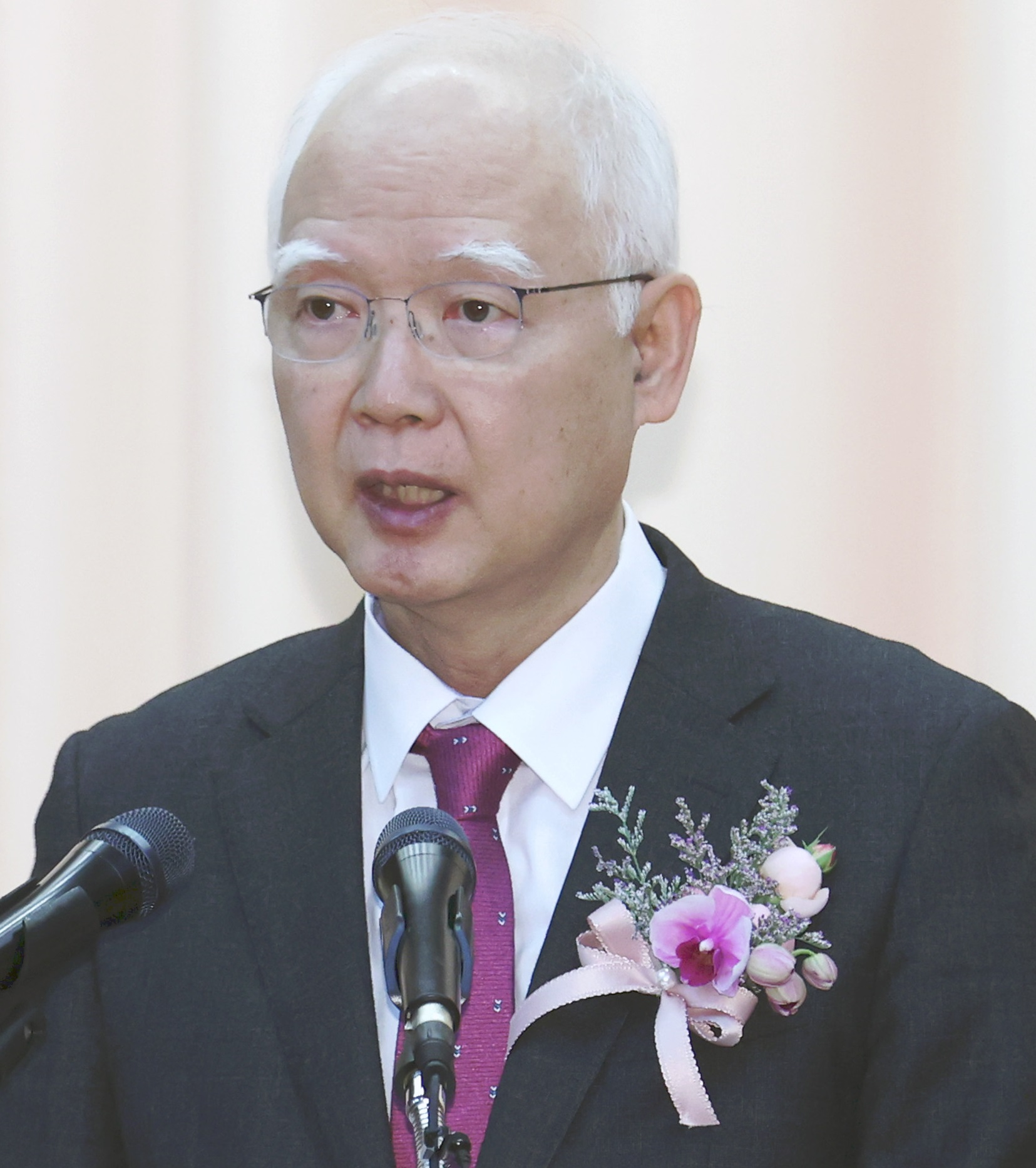

Justice of the Constitutional Court of Korea
- Incumbent
- Assumed office December 18, 2023
- Appointed by: Yoon Suk Yeol
- Preceded by: Yoo Nam-seok

Personal details
- Born: 2 September 1961 (age 64) Yanggu, South Korea
- Education: Seoul National University (LL.B., LL.M.)

Korean name
- Hangul: 정형식
- Hanja: 鄭亨植
- RR: Jeong Hyeongsik
- MR: Chŏng Hyŏngsik

Cheong Hyungsik (Korean: 정형식; born September 2, 1961) is a South Korean jurist who serves as a justice of the Constitutional Court of Korea. He was nominated directly by national President Yoon Suk Yeol on November 16, 2023, and officially appointed to the court on December 18, 2023.

Originally from Yanggu, Gangwon, Cheong graduated from the Seoul National University College of Law and 17th class of the Judicial Research and Training Institute before beginning his career as a judge for the Seongnam Branch of the Suwon District Court in 1988. For the next 35 years, he served as a judge for courts in Seoul, South Gyeongsang, Gyeonggi, North Chungcheong, and Daejeon. In 2023, he was nominated and appointed to the Constitutional Court as a replacement for Justice Yoo Nam-seok. During his tenure on the court, he has been classified as a conservative judge.

== Early life and education ==
Cheong was born on September 2, 1961, in Yanggu, Gangwon. After graduating from Seoul High School in 1980, Cheong attended Seoul National University College of Law and graduated in 1985. In the same year, Cheong passed the 27th bar examination and postponed his enlistment. In 1986, Cheong was exempted from military service after being diagnosed with a bone infection. Cheong then graduated from the 17th class of the Judicial Research and Training Institute in 1988. In 1990, Cheong completed an LLM program at Seoul National University.

== Early judicial career ==
Upon graduation from the Judicial Research and Training Institute, Cheong was hired as a judge for the Seongnam Branch of the Suwon District Court in March 1988. Cheong then worked as a judge for the Seoul Family Court in 1990 and the Seoul Civil District Court in 1991 before heading south to work at the Jinju Branch of the Changwon District Court from 1992 to 1994. In 1995, Cheong returned to Seoul and worked at the Seoul District Court before transferring to the court's eastern branch in 1997. In 1999, Cheong returned to the Seongnam Branch of the Suwon District Court before joining the Seoul High Court in 2000.

From 2001 to 2003, Cheong worked as a research judge for the South Korea Supreme Court's criminal investigation division. Cheong then joined the Cheongju District Court as a chief judge in 2003 and transferred to the Suwon District Court in 2005. From 2007 to 2010, Cheong served on the Seoul Administrative Court as a chief judge and was evaluated as an outstanding judge by the Seoul Bar Association in 2009. In 2010, Cheong returned to the Suwon District Court as the chief of the Pyeongtaek Branch. Cheong then became a chief judge for the Daejeon High Court in 2011 and the Seoul High Court in 2012.

During Cheong's time on the Seoul High Court, he served as an acting chief judge for the Seoul Administrative Court in 2014 and was evaluated as an outstanding judge by the Seoul Bar Association in 2015. In 2019, Cheong joined the Seoul Rehabilitation Court as a chief justice where Cheong promoted the development of simplified bankruptcy procedures, the creation of a practical counseling center, and the implementation of remote video trials. In 2021, Cheong joined the Suwon High Court as a chief judge before returning to the Daejeon High Court as a chief justice in 2023.

=== Notable rulings ===
==== Dismissal of KBS president ====
On November 12, 2009, Cheong ruled that President Lee Myung-bak's dismissal of Jeong Yeon-ju, the head of KBS, was improper. Jeong Yeon-ju, who was first appointed as president of KBS in 2003, was fired by President Lee on August 11, 2008, after requests for his dismissal were made by the Board of Audit and Inspection and KBS's own board of directors. Jeong Yeon-ju then filed a lawsuit against the government challenging the dismissal in the Seoul Administrative Court.

Chief Judge Cheong ruled in Jeong Yeon-ju's favor, finding President Lee's dismissal was an illegal abuse of discretion. While Cheong acknowledged Jeong Yeon-ju had made errors in managing KBS, Cheong determined the dismissal was procedurally improper because "former President Jeong was not notified of the disciplinary action in advance or given the opportunity to express his opinion." In 2012, the South Korea Supreme Court confirmed Cheong's ruling.

==== Retrial of Cho Hee-hyeon ====
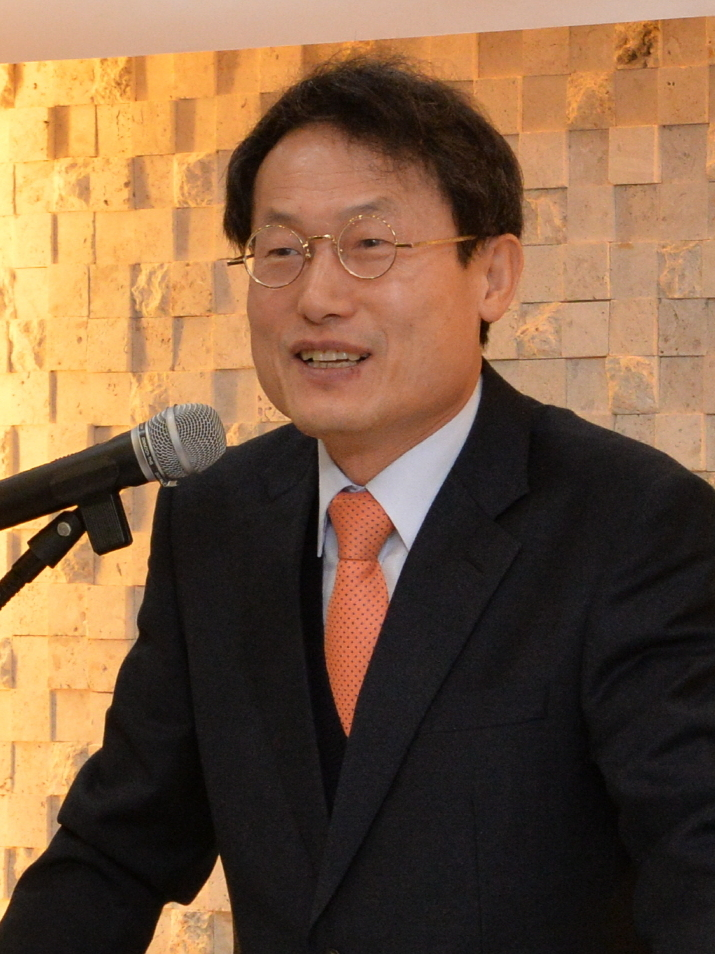
Cho Hee-yeon

In a retrial held by the Seoul High Court on July 31, 2013, Cheong ruled Sungkonghoe University professor Cho Hee-yeon was not guilty of violating Emergency Measure No. 9 during the presidency of Park Chung Hee. In 1978, Cho, who was then a student at Seoul National University, was indicted for creating and distributing leaflets that criticized the Yushin Constitution and sentenced to two years in prison. In finding Cho not guilty, Cheong noted the emergency measures were unconstitutional because "it is clear that they were intended to suppress the people's resistance to the Yushin regime." Cheong went on to state "the state's emergency powers should be exercised within the minimum necessary limits when the country is in a grave crisis, but the situation at the time the emergency measures were declared did not correspond to a grave national crisis as an emergency, so it lacked the requirements stipulated in the Constitution."

==== Trial of Han Myeong-sook ====
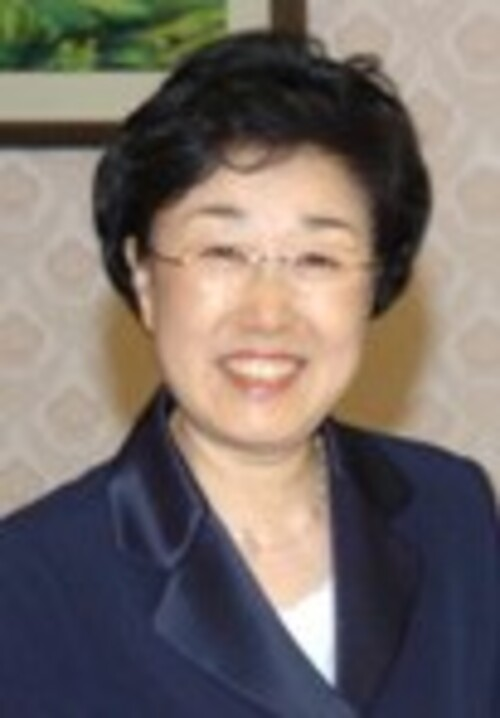
Han Myeong-sook

In an appeal trial held by the 6th Criminal Division of the Seoul High Court on September 16, 2013, Cheong convicted former Prime Minister Han Myeong-sook of receiving illegal political funds and sentenced Han to two years in prison along with a fine of 883 million won. In July 2010, Han was indicted on charges of receiving 900 million won from Hanshin Construction CEO Han Man-ho during the 2007 presidential primaries. While Han Man-ho had made a statement to the prosecution that implicated Han Myeong-sook, Han Man-ho changed his testimony during the first trial and claimed "I have never given any political funds to Prime Minister Han Myeong-sook. Prime Minister Han is being falsely accused because of me, a cowardly and mean person."

At the conclusion of the first trial, the court found Han Myeong-sook not guilty of the charges on the grounds that Han Man-ho's initial statement to the prosecution lacked credibility. The court's ruling was also based on the findings that Han Man-ho and Han Myeong-sook were not close enough to exchange money, that the ledgers submitted as evidence may have been falsified, and that the circumstance of Han Myeong-sook receiving the money on the street on broad daylight did not appear plausible.

During the appeal trial, Cheong disagreed with the first court's finding and found Han Man-ho's initial statement to the prosecution to be credible. Cheong also found Han Man-ho and Han Myeong-sook were in a close relationship as relatives and friends. In imposing a sentence of two years in prison and fine of 883 million won, Cheong stated the nature of crime of was serious and that Han Myeong-sook lacked remorse. In a statement following the ruling, Han Myeong-sook maintained her innocence, claimed Cheong's ruling was politically motivated, and promised to appeal the verdict while her party, the Democratic Party, criticized the ruling as an "obvious political verdict." In 2015, the Supreme Court confirmed Cheong's decision.

==== Sentencing of Lee Jae-yong ====
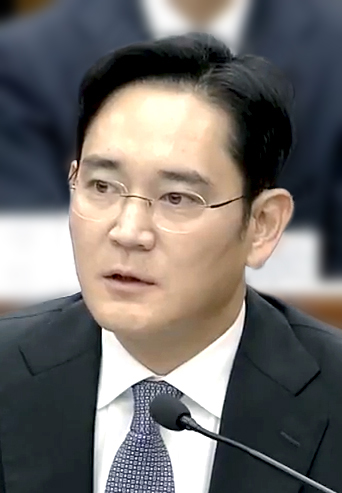
Lee Jae-yong

On February 5, 2018, Cheong, while serving as chief judge of the Seoul High Court's 13th Criminal Division, reduced the sentence of Samsung executive Lee Jae-yong from five years to two years and six months with the sentence suspended for four years. The initial five-year sentence had been imposed by the Seoul Central District Court after they convicted Lee of perjury, embezzlement, and bribery in August 2017. The conviction was based on allegations that Lee had offered $30 million USD in bribes to President Park Geun-hye and Choi Soon-sil in exchange for securing their support in Lee's bid to strengthen control over Samsung.

In reducing Lee's sentence, Cheong overturned the district court's rulings on some of the bribery charges and stated "it is difficult to acknowledge that there was a comprehensive issue of Samsung's succession process." Cheong also determined that "Chairman Lee Jae-yong was a victim of coercion by former President Park Geun-hye." Following the ruling, Cheong participated in an interview with the Chosun Ilbo where Cheong defended the court's decision, stating "The legal principle was a clear area that could not be compromised and was not a matter for concern."

In the aftermath of Lee's appeal trial, Cheong faced criticism from the legal community and members of the public who believed the sentence imposed on Lee was too lenient. A petition on the Blue House National Petition Bulletin Board that requested a special audit of Cheong gained over 200,000 signatures within three days of its posting. On August 29, 2019, the Supreme Court overturned the verdict, stating the court "misunderstood the law."

== Constitutional Court of South Korea (2023–present) ==
=== Nomination ===
On November 16, 2023, President Yoon Suk Yeol nominated Cheong as the replacement for Justice Yoo Nam-seok, who retired from the Constitutional Court on November 10, 2023. On December 12, 2023, the National Assembly held a hearing on Cheong's nomination. During the hearing, Cheong evaluated the increase in impeachment proceedings as "the process of the Constitution coming to life" while declining to comment on specific impeachment cases pending before the Constitutional Court.

When asked about Han Dong-hoon's criticism of the Constitutional Court as minister of justice, Cheong stated "you can logically criticize a decision, but I don't think it's appropriate for the person involved, especially the Minister of Justice, to immediately say, 'It's wrong.'" On the issue of the legalization of same-sex marriage, Cheong stated "recognizing homosexuality personally and socially and institutionalizing same-sex marriage are separate issues." Cheong also remarked that "homosexuality is a realm of the right to self-determination, but it can be restricted to the extent necessary."

When questioned about his sentencing of Lee Jae-young, Cheong initially stated he still believed Lee was a victim of President Park Geun-hye but respected the Supreme Court's decision to reverse his verdict. Cheong then clarified later in the hearing that "I don't think he's a victim" and stated "in terms of legal judgment, although my judgment was not accepted by the Supreme Court, I do not think it was wrong."

Cheong was questioned about receiving official passports for his children to travel with him to Europe in 2003 as part of an international training program when it was not the policy to issue official passports for children on short-term business trips. While Cheong acknowledged that the issuance of passports would be inappropriate, he explained he was unsure why the passports were issued and that he paid for all of the expenses. Cheong also was questioned about making six million won in donations to a North Korean defector support group from 2018 to 2022 that had conservative leanings. In response, Cheong stated "if it is an organization with clear colors, I think I (as a constitutional judge) should not do that."

On December 18, 2023, the National Assembly's Legislation and Judiciary Committee adopted a personnel hearing report that contained split opinions on whether Cheong was qualified for appointment to the Constitutional Court. While legislators from the ruling People Power Party deemed Cheong to be qualified, legislators from the opposition Democratic Party found Cheong to be unqualified based on his prior rulings in the Lee Jae-yong case. On the same day, Cheong received his official letter of appointment from President Yoon and attended an inauguration ceremony at the Constitutional Court on December 19, 2023.

=== Tenure ===
When Cheong, who was classified as a conservative justice, joined the Constitutional Court in December 2023, the court was reorganized as a conservative-moderate majority court for the first time since 2019. Since joining the court, media outlets have consistently classified him as a conservative.

==== Impeachment rulings ====
On May 30, 2024, Cheong joined a 5–4 majority of the Constitutional Court in dismissing the impeachment of Ahn Dong-wan, a deputy chief prosecutor from the Busan District Prosecutors' Office. The National Assembly had initially impeached Ahn for the retaliatory prosecution of a Seoul official. Although five of the court's nine justices agreed to dismiss the impeachment, they were divided on their reasoning. While Justices Lee Jong-seok and Lee Eun-ae determined any violation of the law was not sufficiently serious to justify dismissal, Cheong joined Justices Lee Young-jin and Kim Hyeong-du in ruling that Ahn's actions did not constitute an abuse of power in the first place.

On December 16, 2024, Cheong was randomly selected through an electronic allocation system to serve as the presiding justice for President Yoon's impeachment trial.

==== Medical Act ====
On February 28, 2024, Cheong was part of a 6–3 majority of the Constitutional Court that held the Medical Act's ban on revealing the sex of a fetus until the 32nd week of pregnancy was unconstitutional. The court held restricting gender disclosure was no longer reasonable as the preference for male children has declined as evidenced by South Korea's sex ratio at birth reaching the normal range in 2014.

==== Comprehensive Real Estate Tax Act ====
On May 30, 2024, Cheong joined Justices Lee Eun-ae and Jung Jungmi in dissenting from the Constitutional Court's decision that found the Comprehensive Real Estate Tax Act to be constitutional. The majority found that the tax provisions had a legitimate purpose of promoting price stability and were not excessive. In dissent, Cheong and the other justices argued the tax was unconstitutional because it was excessive as it imposed a higher tax rate on the owners of two houses in the regulated area without regard for whether the properties were owned for purposes not involving real estate speculation.

==== Environment ====
On August 29, 2024, Cheong joined a unanimous majority of the Constitutional Court in ruling the Carbon Neutrality Framework Act's failure to set a greenhouse gas emissions reduction target after 2031 was unconstitutional because it failed to protect basic rights. While Cheong joined four justices in also finding the Act's emissions reduction targets for 2030 to be inadequate and unconstitutional, they lacked the six votes required to overturn this portion of the Act.

== Personal life ==
Cheong is married to the youngest sister of Park Seon-yeong, the current chairwoman of the Truth and Reconciliation Commission, and has two sons. He is also the second cousin of Gangwon Governor Kim Jin-tae and brother-in-law of former Supreme Court Justice Min Il-young.

== See also ==
- List of justices of the Constitutional Court of Korea

Legal offices
Preceded by Yoo Nam-seok	Justice of the Constitutional Court of Korea; 2023–present	Incumbent
