= Justice of the Constitutional Court of Korea =

Members of the Constitutional Court of Korea

- 헌법재판소 재판관 (Korean)
- Emblem of the Constitutional Court

- Flag of the Constitutional Court of Korea

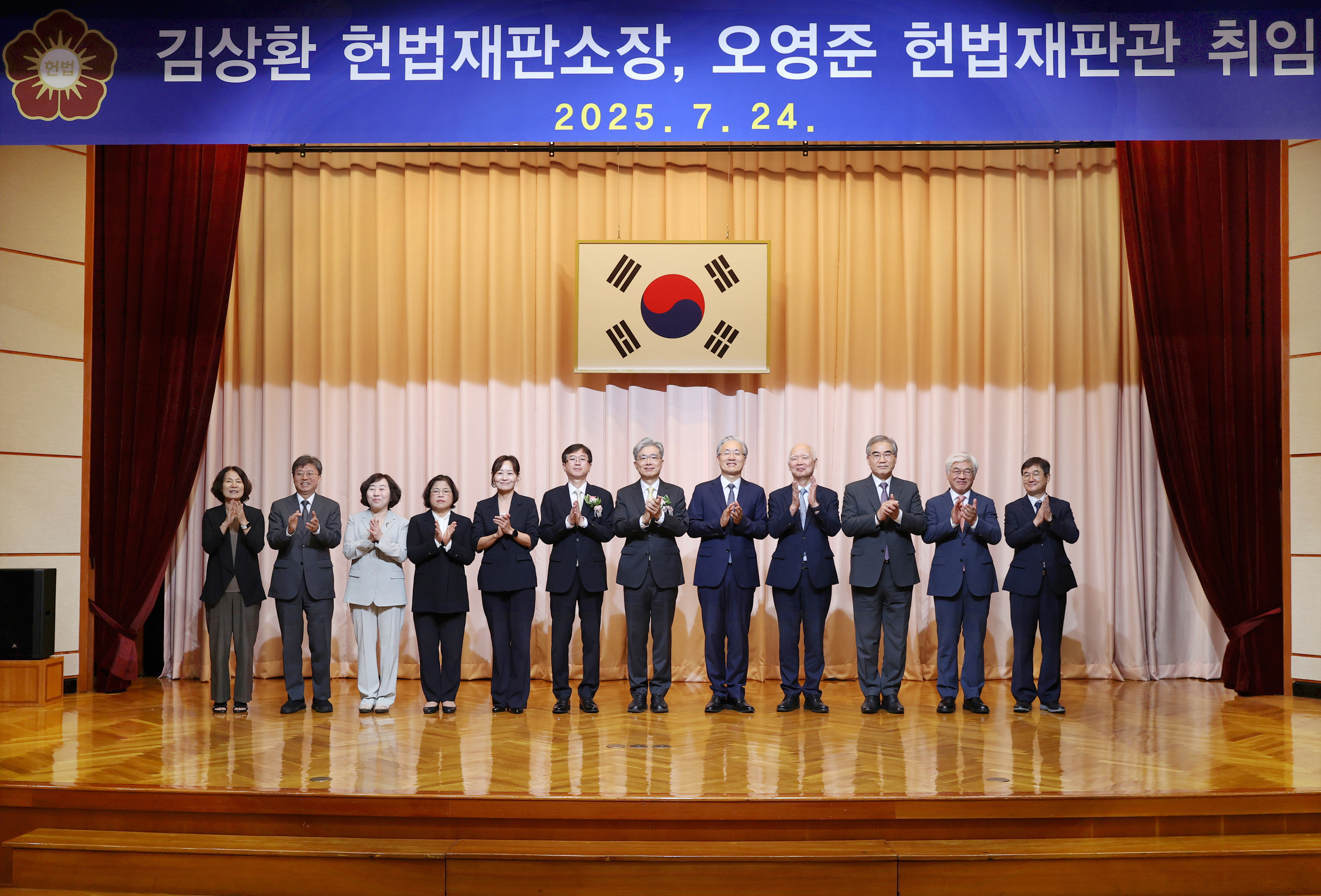
- Current Justice of the Constitutional Court of Korea as of July 24, 2025
- Constitutional Court of Korea
- Style: Your Honor
- Status: Justice
- Member of: Council of Constitutional Court Justices
- Seat: Jongno, Seoul
- Appointer: President of South Korea
- Term length: Six years, renewable
- Constituting instrument: Constitution of South Korea
- Formation: 1 September 1988; 38 years ago
- Website: Official english website

The Constitutional Court of Korea is one of two highest courts in the court system of South Korea. It is composed of nine Constitutional Court justices (Korean: 헌법재판소 재판관; Hanja: 憲法裁判所 裁判官; RR: Heonbeopjaepanso Jaepangwan). One of the nine justices serves as the chief justice, officially titled the President of the Constitutional Court. The number of Constitutional Court justices is specified in Article 111 Clause 2 of the Constitution of South Korea.

By Article 111 Clause 2 of the constitution, all of the Constitutional Court justices are appointed by the president of South Korea. However, following Article 111 Clause 3 of the constitution, three of the Constitutional Court justices should be appointed from candidates selected by the National Assembly, and another three should be appointed from candidates nominated by the Supreme Court chief justice. Thus, only three of nine Constitutional Court justices are directly appointed by the president of South Korea. They serve for a renewable six-year term under Article 112 Clause 1 of the constitution. All but two justices retired without renewing the term, citing the potential harm to judicial independence and outsize influence of the president of South Korea on the Constitutional Court.

According to Article 5 Clause 1 of the Constitutional Court Act, Constitutional Court justices should be at least 40 years old, qualified as an attorney, and have more than 15 years of career in legal practice or legal academia.

== Current members ==
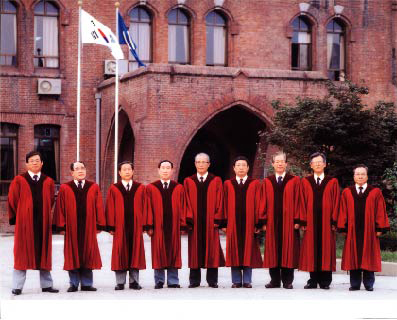
Nine inaugural justices of the Court in 1988

This table lists current justices in Constitutional Court of Korea.

Name	Tenure / Current Length	Appointed by	Selected·Nominated by	Education
Kim Hyungdu	March 31, 2023 / 3 years, 5 months	Yoon Suk Yeol	Chief Justice (Kim Myeong-soo)	Seoul National University
Jeong Jeong-mi	April 17, 2023 / 3 years, 4 months	Yoon Suk Yeol	Chief Justice (Kim Myeong-soo)	Seoul National University
Jeong Hyeong-sik	December 18, 2023 / 2 years, 8 months	Yoon Suk Yeol	(Directly by President of South Korea)	Seoul National University
Kim Bok-hyeong	September 21, 2024 / 1 year, 11 months	Yoon Suk Yeol	Chief Justice (Cho Hee-dae)	Seoul National University
Cho Hanchang	January 1, 2025 / 1 year, 8 months	Choi Sang-mok	National Assembly (People Power Party)	Seoul National University
Chung Kyesun	January 1, 2025 / 1 year, 8 months	Choi Sang-mok	National Assembly (Democratic Party)	Seoul National University
Ma Eunhyeok	April 9, 2025 / 1 year, 4 months	Han Duck-soo	National Assembly (Democratic Party)	Seoul National University
Kim Sang-hwan	July 23, 2025 / 1 year, 1 month	Lee Jae Myung	(Directly by President of South Korea)	Seoul National University
Oh Yeong-jun	July 23, 2025 / 1 year, 1 month	Lee Jae Myung	(Directly by President of South Korea)	Seoul National University

== Former justices ==
This table lists former justices in the Constitutional Court of Korea. Since South Korea adopted American styled 3-year law school system for legal education in 2008, 'education' column of below table means where former justices received undergraduate degrees.

Name	Tenure	Position	Appointed by	Selected·Nominated by		Education
Cho Kyu-kwang	Sep. 1988 − Sep. 1994	1st President	Roh Tae-woo	(Directly by President of South Korea)		Seoul National University
Lee Seong-yeol	Sep. 1988 − Aug. 1991	Justice	Roh Tae-woo	Chief Justice	Lee Il-kyu	Chosun University
Byun Jeong-soo	Sep. 1988 − Sep. 1994	Justice	Roh Tae-woo	National Assembly	Peace Democratic	Korea University (dropped out)
Kim Chin-woo	Sep. 1988 − Sep. 1994	Justice	Roh Tae-woo	National Assembly	Reunification Democratic	Seoul National University
Kim Chin-woo	Sep. 1994 − Jan. 1997	Justice	Kim Young-sam	(Directly by President of South Korea)		Seoul National University
Han Byung-chae	Sep. 1988 − Sep. 1994	Justice	Roh Tae-woo	National Assembly	Democratic Justice	Seoul National University
Lee Shi-yoon	Sep. 1988 − Dec. 1993	Justice	Roh Tae-woo	Chief Justice	Lee Il-kyu	Seoul National University
Choe Kwang-ryool	Sep. 1988 − Sep. 1994	Justice	Roh Tae-woo	(Directly by President of South Korea)		Seoul National University
Kim Yang-kyun	Sep. 1988 − Sep. 1994	Justice	Roh Tae-woo	(Directly by President of South Korea)		Chonnam National University
Kim Moon-hee	Sep. 1988 − Sep. 1994	Justice	Roh Tae-woo	Chief Justice	Lee Il-kyu	Seoul National University
Kim Moon-hee	Sep. 1994 − Sep. 2000	Justice	Kim Young-sam	(By consensus of National Assembly)		Seoul National University
Hwang Do-yun	Aug. 1991 − Aug. 1997	Justice	Roh Tae-woo	Chief Justice	Kim Deok-ju	Seoul National University
Lee Jae-hwa	Dec. 1993 − Dec. 1999	Justice	Kim Young-sam	Chief Justice	Yun Kwan	Seoul National University
Kim Yong-joon	Sep. 1994 − Sep. 2000	2nd President	Kim Young-sam	(Directly by President of South Korea)		Seoul National University
Cho Seung-hyung	Sep. 1994 − Sep. 1999	Justice	Kim Young-sam	National Assembly	Democratic	Seoul National University
Chung Kyung-sik	Sep. 1994 − Sep. 2000	Justice	Kim Young-sam	(Directly by President of South Korea)		Korea University
Koh Joong-suk	Sep. 1994 − Sep. 2000	Justice	Kim Young-sam	Chief Justice	Yun Kwan	Seoul National University
Shin Chang-on	Sep. 1994 − Sep. 2000	Justice	Kim Young-sam	National Assembly	Democratic Liberal	Seoul National University
Lee Young-mo	Jan. 1997 − Mar. 2001	Justice	Kim Young-sam	(Directly by President of South Korea)		Pusan National University
Han Dae-hyun	Aug. 1997 − Aug. 2003	Justice	Kim Young-sam	Chief Justice	Yun Kwan	Seoul National University
Ha Kyung-chul	Sep. 1999 − Jan. 2004	Justice	Kim Dae-jung	National Assembly	New Politics	Seoul National University
Kim Young-il	Dec. 1999 − Mar. 2005	Justice	Kim Dae-jung	Chief Justice	Choi Jong-young	Seoul National University
Yun Young-chul	Sep. 2000 − Sep. 2006	3rd President	Kim Dae-jung	(Directly by President of South Korea)		Seoul National University
Kwon Seong	Sep. 2000 − Aug. 2006	Justice	Kim Dae-jung	National Assembly	Grand National	Seoul National University
Kim Hyo-jong	Sep. 2000 − Sep. 2006	Justice	Kim Dae-jung	(By consensus of National Assembly)		Seoul National University
Kim Kyoung-il	Sep. 2000 − Sep. 2006	Justice	Kim Dae-jung	Chief Justice	Choi Jong-young	Seoul National University
Song In-jun	Sep. 2000 − Sep. 2006	Justice	Kim Dae-jung	(Directly by President of South Korea)		Seoul National University
Choo Sun-hoe	Mar. 2001 − Mar. 2007	Justice	Kim Dae-jung	(Directly by President of South Korea)		Korea University
Jeon Hyo-sook	Aug. 2003 − Aug. 2006	Justice	Roh Moo-hyun	Chief Justice	Choi Jong-young	Ewha Womans University
Lee Sang-kyung	Feb. 2004 − Jun. 2005	Justice	Roh Moo-hyun	National Assembly	Millennium Democratic	Chung-Ang University
Lee Kong-hyun	Mar. 2005 − Mar. 2011	Justice	Roh Moo-hyun	Chief Justice	Choi Jong-young	Seoul National University
Cho Dae-hyen	Jul. 2005 − Jul. 2011	Justice	Roh Moo-hyun	National Assembly	Uri	Seoul National University
Kim Hee-ok	Sep. 2006 − Dec. 2010	Justice	Roh Moo-hyun	(Directly by President of South Korea)		Dongguk University
Kim Jong-dae	Sep. 2006 − Sep. 2012	Justice	Roh Moo-hyun	Chief Justice	Lee Yong-hoon	Seoul National University
Min Hyeong-ki	Sep. 2006 − Sep. 2012	Justice	Roh Moo-hyun	Chief Justice	Lee Yong-hoon	Seoul National University
Lee Dong-heub	Sep. 2006 − Sep. 2012	Justice	Roh Moo-hyun	National Assembly	Grand National	Seoul National University
Mok Young-joon	Sep. 2006 − Sep. 2012	Justice	Roh Moo-hyun	(By consensus of National Assembly)		Seoul National University
Lee Kang-kook	Jan. 2007 − Jan. 2013	4th President	Roh Moo-hyun	(Directly by President of South Korea)		Seoul National University
Song Doo-hwan	Mar. 2007 − Mar. 2013	Justice	Roh Moo-hyun	(Directly by President of South Korea)		Seoul National University
Park Han-chul	Feb. 2011 − Apr. 2013	Justice	Lee Myung-bak	(Directly by President of South Korea)		Seoul National University
Park Han-chul	Apr. 2013 − Jan. 2017	5th President	Park Geun-hye	(Directly by President of South Korea)		Seoul National University
Lee Jung-mi	Mar. 2011 − Mar. 2017	Justice	Lee Myung-bak	Chief Justice	Lee Yong-hoon	Korea University
Kim Yi-Su	Sep. 2012 − Sep. 2018	Justice	Lee Myung-bak	National Assembly	Democratic United	Seoul National University
Lee Jin-sung	Sep. 2012 − Nov. 2017	Justice	Lee Myung-bak	Chief Justice	Yang Sung-tae	Seoul National University
Lee Jin-sung	Nov. 2017 − Sep. 2018	6th President	Moon Jae-in	(Directly by President of South Korea)		Seoul National University
Kim Chang-jong	Sep. 2012 − Sep. 2018	Justice	Lee Myung-bak	Chief Justice	Yang Sung-tae	Kyungpook National University
Ahn Chang-ho	Sep. 2012 − Sep. 2018	Justice	Lee Myung-bak	National Assembly	Saenuri	Seoul National University
Kang Il-won	Sep. 2012 − Sep. 2018	Justice	Lee Myung-bak	(By consensus of National Assembly)		Seoul National University
Seo Ki-seog	Apr. 2013 − Apr. 2019	Justice	Park Geun-hye	(Directly by President of South Korea)		Seoul National University
Cho Yong-ho	Apr. 2013 − Apr. 2019	Justice	Park Geun-hye	(Directly by President of South Korea)		Konkuk University
Lee Seon-ae	Mar. 2017 − Mar. 2023	Justice	Hwang Kyo-ahn	Chief Justice	Yang Sung-tae	Seoul National University
Yoo Nam-seok	Nov. 2017 − Nov. 2023	Justice	Moon Jae-in	(Directly by President of South Korea)		Seoul National University
Yoo Nam-seok	Sep. 2018 − Nov. 2023	7th President	Moon Jae-in	(Directly by President of South Korea)		Seoul National University
Lee Suk-tae	Sep. 2018 − Apr. 2023	Justice	Moon Jae-in	Chief Justice	Kim Myeong-soo	Seoul National University
Lee Eunae	Sep. 2018 − Sep. 2024	Justice	Moon Jae-in	Chief Justice	Kim Myeong-soo	Seoul National University
Lee Jongseok	Oct. 2018 − Oct. 2024	Justice	Moon Jae-in	National Assembly	Liberty Korea	Seoul National University
Lee Jongseok	Nov. 2023 − Oct. 2024	8th President	Yoon Suk Yeol	(Directly by President of South Korea)		Seoul National University
Lee Youngjin	Oct. 2018 − Oct. 2024	Justice	Moon Jae-in	National Assembly	Bareunmirae	Sungkyunkwan University
Kim Kiyoung	Oct. 2018 − Oct. 2024	Justice	Moon Jae-in	National Assembly	Democratic	Seoul National University
Moon Hyungbae	Apr. 2019 − Apr. 2025	Justice	Moon Jae-in	(Directly by President of South Korea)		Seoul National University
Lee Mison	Apr. 2019 − Apr. 2025	Justice	Moon Jae-in	(Directly by President of South Korea)		Pusan National University

== See also ==
- Judiciary of South Korea
- Constitutional Court of Korea
- President of the Constitutional Court of Korea
- Lists of supreme court justices
