= Impeachment of Han Duck-soo =

2024 South Korean charging of president

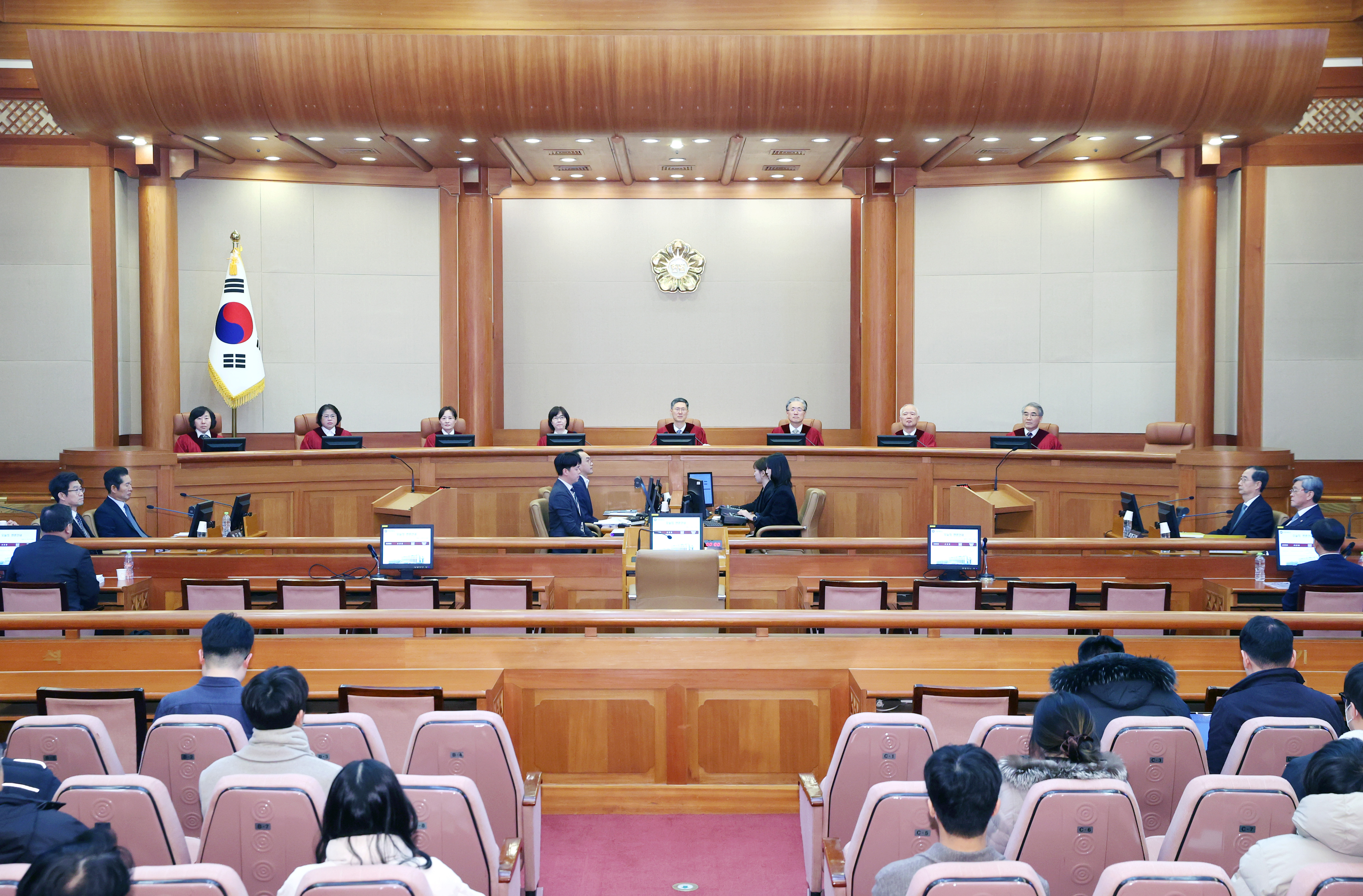
- Impeachment trial at the Constitutional Court, 19 February 2025
- Accused: Han Duck-soo (Prime Minister and acting President of South Korea)
- Date: 27 December 2024 to 24 March 2025 (2 months, 3 weeks and 4 days)
- Cause: Refusal to promulgate bills for special counsel investigations of Yoon Suk Yeol and Kim Keon-hee; Blocking three National Assembly-approved Constitutional Court appointments

Impeachment motion (27 December 2024)
- Votes in favor: 192 / 300 (64%)
- Not voting: 108 / 300 (36%)
- Result: Impeachment successful: Choi Sang-mok becomes both acting president and acting prime minister

Decision by Constitutional Court of Korea (24 March 2025)
- Votes in favor: 1 / 8 (13%)
- Votes against: 7 / 8 (88%) (2 reject; 5 dismiss)
- Result: Impeachment dismissed: Han Duck-soo resumes his powers and duties as both acting president and prime minister

On 27 December 2024, South Korean prime minister and acting president Han Duck-soo was impeached. The impeachment occurred 13 days after President Yoon Suk Yeol had been impeached as a result of his brief enactment of martial law, making Han acting president.

Opposition Democratic Party Floor Leader Park Chan-dae announced plans to impeach Han on 24 December following his veto of two special counsel bills investigating Yoon and First Lady Kim Keon-hee. On 26 December, the impeachment motion was formally introduced after Han blocked the appointment of three justices to the Constitutional Court of Korea, whose nominations had been approved by the National Assembly.

On 27 December, all 192 opposition Assembly members unanimously voted in favor of Han's impeachment, after Speaker Woo Won-shik ruled that, as a cabinet minister, Han's impeachment was subject to a simple-majority rule. The remaining 108 Assembly members, all from Yoon's People Power Party (PPP), boycotted the vote. Deputy Prime Minister and Finance Minister Choi Sang-mok assumed the roles of acting president and acting prime minister pending the Constitutional Court's decision on Han's removal from office.

On 24 March 2025, the Constitutional Court voted to overturn Han's impeachment, reinstating him as acting president and prime minister.

== Background ==
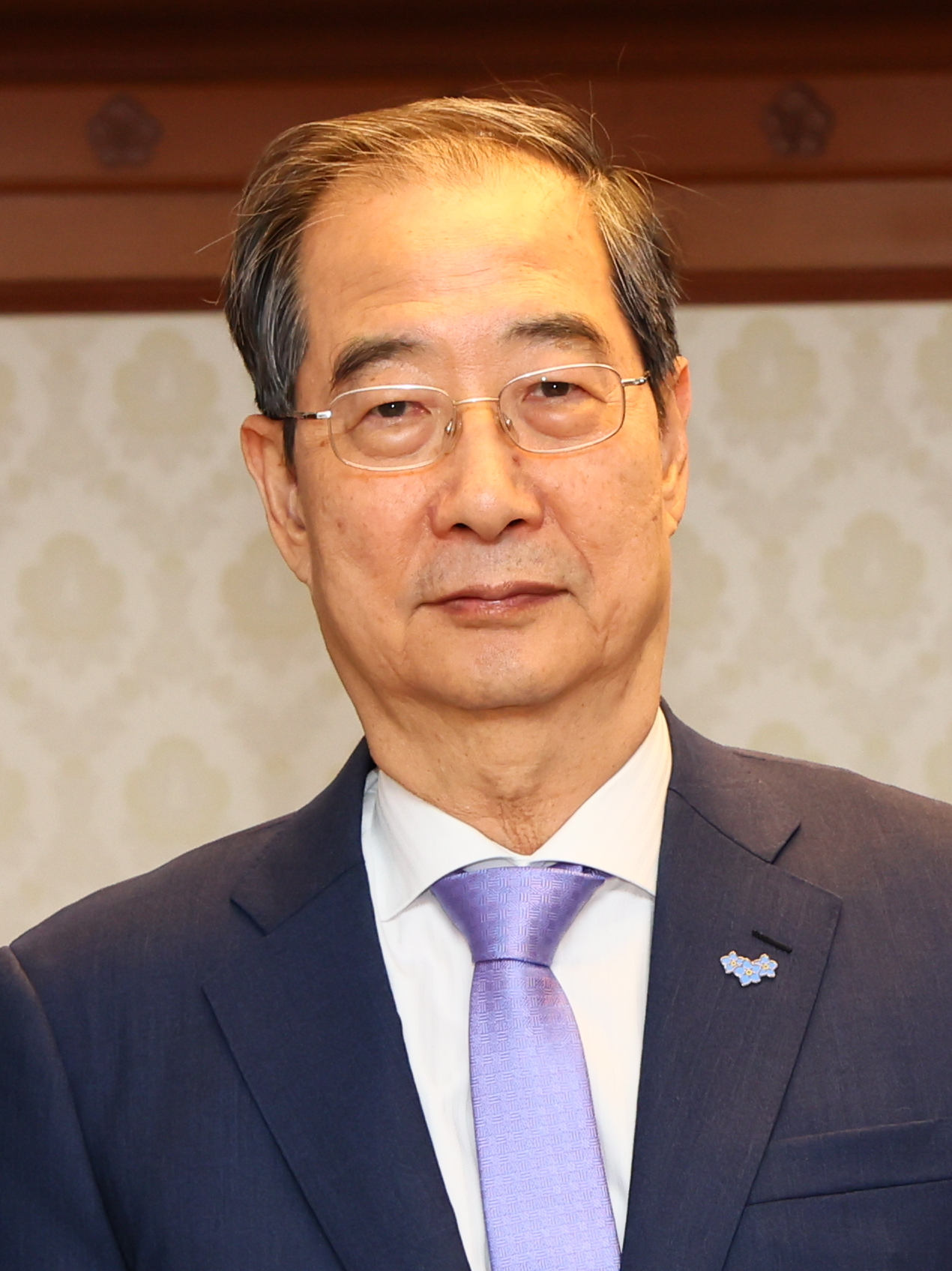
Han Duck-soo in 2024

The 1987 constitution established South Korea as a presidential democracy. At the time of Han's impeachment, only one Korean president had been removed from office through impeachment (Park Geun-hye in 2017), which requires a two-thirds majority voting in favor in the legislature. Former president Roh Moo-hyun was impeached in 2004, but the Constitutional Court acquitted him of two infractions and deemed the remaining charge not serious enough to warrant removal, allowing him to remain in office.

=== Impeachment procedure ===
The procedure for impeachment, established in Article 65, Clause 1 of the 10th Constitution of South Korea (1987), specifies that the National Assembly may impeach the president, prime minister, or other state officials if they violate the constitution or other laws while performing official duties.

For an impeachment motion against a sitting president to pass, a two-thirds majority of the National Assembly – 200 out of 300 members – must vote in favor. Once passed, the individual is immediately suspended from their duties pending a ruling by the Constitutional Court of Korea. The scope of impeachment is limited to removal from public office, with no further penalties imposed through this process. However, as Han is an acting president, disputes have arisen in the National Assembly over the requirements for his impeachment. The People Power Party (PPP) argued that, since Han had assumed the role of the president, a two-thirds majority was required for impeachment. In contrast, the opposition Democratic Party (DPK) maintained that a simple majority was sufficient, as Han remained a cabinet minister. Furthermore, no laws explicitly define the requirements for impeaching an acting president.

According to the Constitutional Court Act passed in 1988, the Constitutional Court must render a decision within 180 days after it receives any case for adjudication, including impeachment cases. If the respondent has already left office before the decision, the case is dismissed. Formal removal of the president requires six of the nine justices voting in favor; due to three vacancies, all six justices would have to vote to remove him. Article 23 of the Constitutional Court Act requires at least seven justices for deliberation. On 14 October 2024, the Constitutional Court temporarily suspended the required deliberation quorum of seven justices, citing the constitutional right to a speedy trial, allowing itself to move forward.

The three vacancies at the Constitutional Court prompted a debate in the National Assembly of Korea over whether acting presidents have the authority to fill such vacancies. The opposition DPK argued that acting presidents could fill the positions, emphasizing that the presidential appointment of National Assembly-recommended nominees is largely procedural. In contrast, Yoon's PPP asserted that acting presidents could appoint justices only in cases of a presidential vacancy, not a suspension of duties.

Han's impeachment is the 16th to be received by the Constitutional Court since its establishment in 1988 and the 13th since impeached President Yoon Suk Yeol took office in 2022.

=== Impeachment of Yoon and acting presidency of Han ===
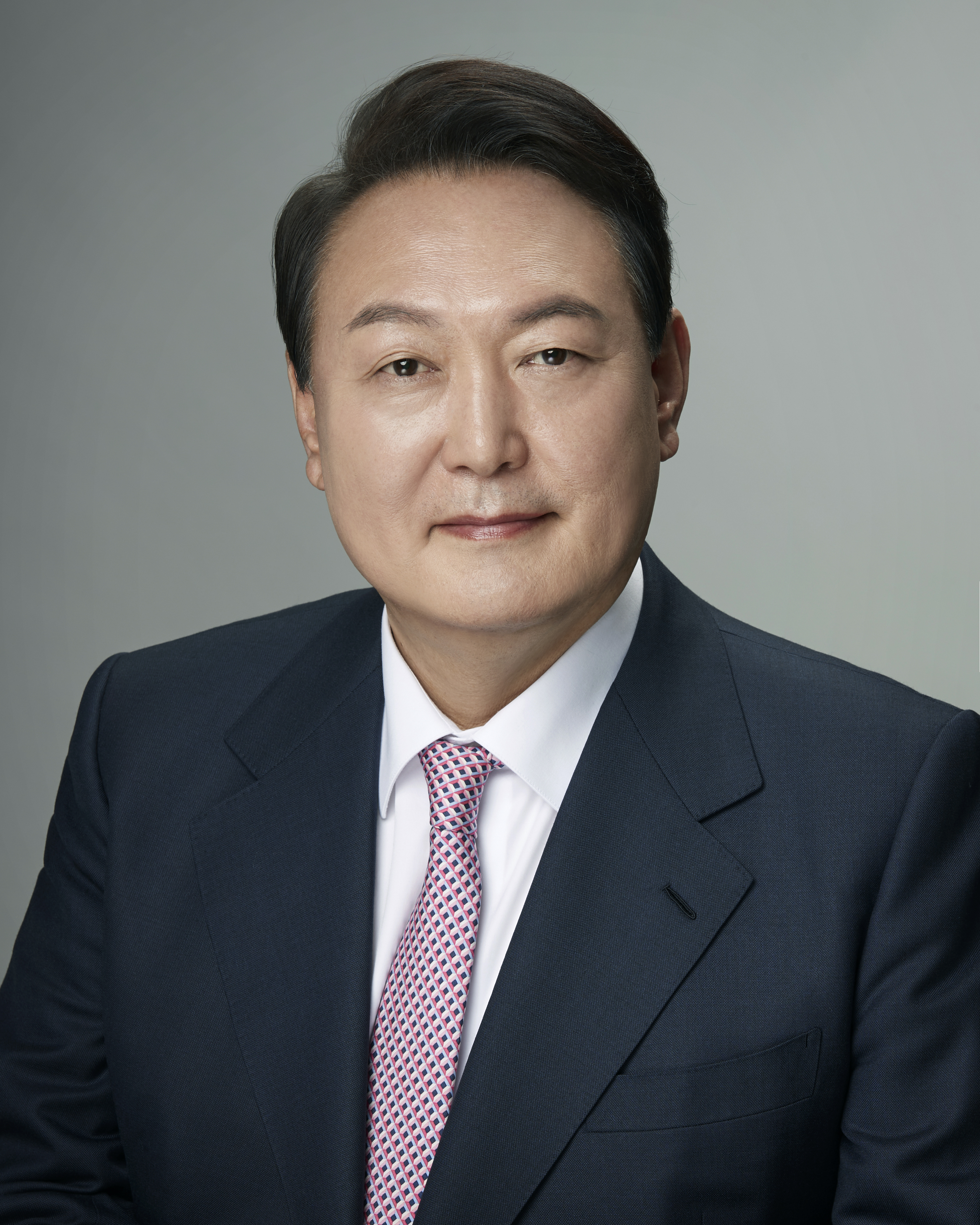
Han became acting president after Yoon Suk Yeol was impeached.

On 14 December 2024, Yoon Suk Yeol, the president of South Korea, was impeached by the National Assembly. This action came in response to Yoon's declaration of martial law on 3 December 2024, which was overturned by the National Assembly and officially withdrawn six hours later on 4 December 2024.

Incumbent Prime Minister Han Duck-soo assumed the role of acting president pending the Constitutional Court's decision on whether to remove Yoon from office. An earlier impeachment motion was put to a parliamentary vote on 7 December 2024 but failed because the number of attending legislators did not meet the quorum required for its passage, as members of the ruling PPP boycotted the vote.

When Han was being asked by police for questioning in its investigation of martial law, DPK Leader Lee Jae-myung initially said that the party would not move to impeach Han for the time being to avoid "confusion in state affairs".

As acting president, Han came into conflict with opposition parties. On 19 December, he vetoed six bills passed by the National Assembly that had been sponsored by the DPK. Among the bills vetoed were proposed amendments to the Grain Management Act, which would have required the government to purchase surplus rice to stabilize prices during market fluctuations. Han cited concerns over its effect on the market as a reason for vetoing the bill. Other measures he vetoed included a bill requiring companies to submit requested data to members of the National Assembly, saying that it was an invasion of constitutional rights to privacy.

== Motion ==
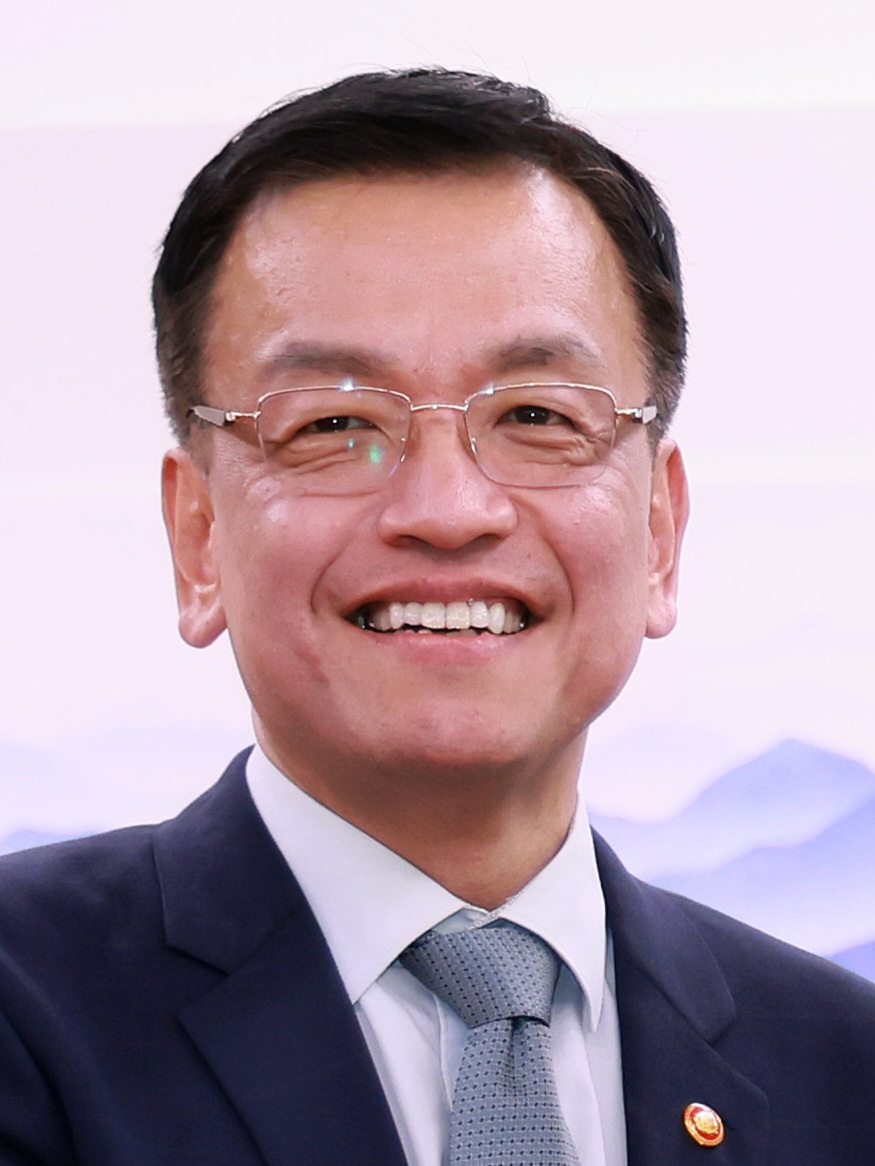
Deputy prime minister Choi Sang-mok became acting president and prime minister after Han's impeachment.

Motion to impeach Han
Choice	Votes
Yes	192 (64%)
No	0
Abstentions	0
Invalid	0
Not voting	108 (36%)
Impeachment successful

After Han's cabinet meeting on 24 December ended without reviewing two bills appointing special counsels to investigate suspended President Yoon Suk Yeol and First Lady Kim Keon-hee, DPK Floor Leader Park Chan-dae announced plans to impeach Han on 24 December. Park described Han's actions as "[a tactic] to buy time and prolong the insurrection". On 26 December, the National Assembly approved a motion to fill the three vacancies in the Constitutional Court, with the PPP not participating in the confirmation vote. However, their appointment was blocked by Han, saying that he needed bipartisan consensus on whether he can approve their installation. In response, the DPK formally filed an impeachment motion against Han that same day, with the plenary vote scheduled for 27 December.

Prior to the vote, Speaker Woo Won-shik ruled that Han can be impeached by a simple majority of 151 due to his status as a cabinet minister, as opposed to the 200 normally required for presidential impeachments. PPP lawmakers opposed Woo's decision, calling for his resignation and declaring his ruling invalid while chanting "abuse of power" as the session was underway. With all PPP members boycotting the vote, Han was impeached by all 192 present MPs on 27 December. Deputy Prime Minister Choi Sang-mok became acting president and prime minister. Han became the first acting president of South Korea to be impeached.

== Aftermath ==
Han said he respected the outcome of the vote in the National Assembly and would await the Constitutional Court's verdict, adding that he would suspend his duties to "not add to the chaos". DPK Leader Lee Jae-myung called Han's impeachment part of the party's efforts to dismantle the "rebellion forces" linked to Yoon Suk Yeol, while the PPP called the DPK "a serial impeachment offender". The PPP later filed for an adjudication on jurisdiction disputes and an injunction with the Constitutional Court to nullify Han's impeachment.

On 30 December, the Constitutional Court released a statement saying that a majority of its justices believed that the process in which Han was impeached was valid. On 31 December, acting president, finance minister, and deputy prime minister, Choi Sang-mok appointed Chung Kyesun and Cho Hanchang to the Constitutional Court but withheld the appointment of Ma Eun-hyuk, citing lack of bipartisan support for his nomination. The move drew criticism from both the PPP, which had argued acting presidents could not appoint justices, and the DPK, which supported the appointment of all three nominees.

== Constitutional Court trial ==
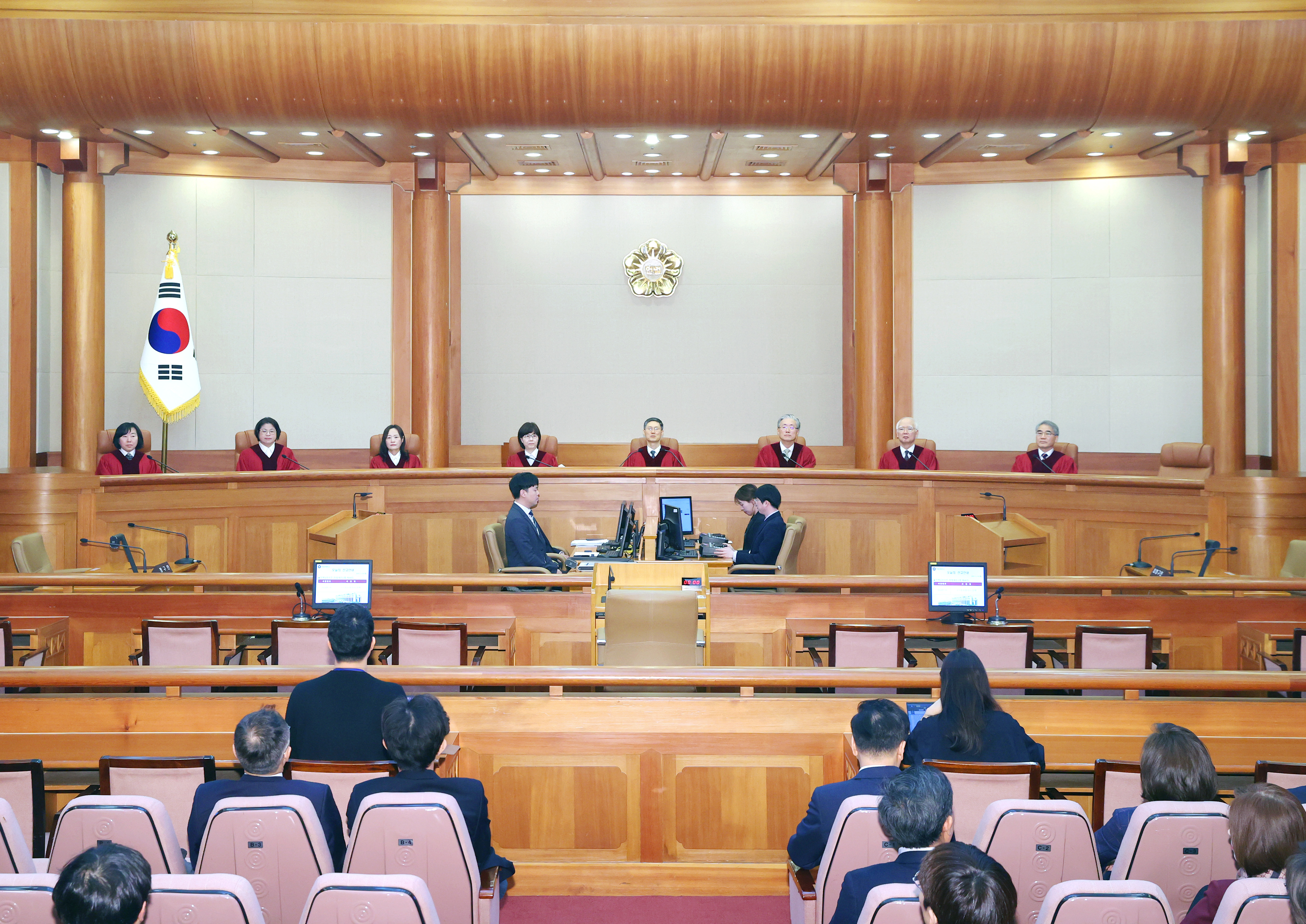
The Constitutional Court pronounced its decision on 24 March 2025, dismissing impeachment of PM Han

Constitutional Court vote
Choice	Votes
Uphold	1 (13%)
Dismiss	5 (63%)
Reject	2 (25%)
Impeachment dismissed

The Constitutional Court of Korea had 180 days from the passage of the impeachment motion to review it. The court was composed of only eight justices, instead of its statutory nine. It held its first pre-trial hearing into Han's impeachment on 13 January 2025. In another preparatory hearing on 5 February, the court set Han's formal impeachment trial to begin on 19 February, with the prosecution and defense teams required to submit necessary documents and evidence by 13 February.

The proceedings opened on 19 February with Han in attendance. Han reiterated his denial of prior knowledge of Yoon's plans to declare martial law and insisted that he had tried to dissuade him from doing so. He also apologized to the public for the ongoing political crisis and asked the country to make a "wise judgment" to enable the nation to reach an "era of rationality". Meanwhile, the National Assembly prosecution team called for Han's impeachment, calling Han's refusal to fill vacancies in the Constitutional Court a "reckless act that threw the nation into chaos". Han's lawyers said that the authority to appoint Constitutional Court justices is the sole prerogative of the president or acting president under the Constitution and does not constitute grounds for impeachment and questioned how the National Assembly reached its quorum to impeach Han. Prosecutors also said Han's decision to veto the special counsel bill on Kim Keon-hee was made because it would be "politically damaging". In response, Han said that its approval would have "fundamentally violated the principles of constitutional governance". Oral arguments for the trial were concluded the same day. Separately, the court also held a hearing on a petition filed by the PPP regarding the parliamentary quorum that led to Han's impeachment.

On 20 March, the Constitutional Court announced that it would issue its verdict regarding Han's impeachment on 24 March. On 24 March, the Constitutional Court voted to overturn Han's impeachment, reinstating him as acting president. Five justices voted to dismiss the impeachment, two (Cho Hanchang and Cheong Hyungsik) voted to reject it, and only one justice, Chung Kyesun, voted to uphold it. Four of the five justices who voted to dismiss the impeachment acknowledged that Han committed constitutional and legal violations in deferring the appointment of additional justices to the court, but they said that it did not justify his removal from office. The six justices who voted to either dismiss or uphold the impeachment said there was no evidence in the National Assembly's accusations that Han took proactive action to help legitimize Yoon's martial law declaration, such as by convening a Cabinet meeting ahead of its declaration. All but two justices sided with the National Assembly in ruling that the quorum to impeach Han was the minimum 151 out of 300 lawmakers needed for a prime minister, rather than the 200 needed to impeach a president.

On 10 April, the Constitutional Court voted 6-2 to reject the PPP's separate petition on the parliamentary quorum that led to Han's impeachment, saying that the requirements for Han to be impeached as a cabinet minister rather than as president under the guidelines set by Speaker Woo did not violate the constitution.

== Reactions ==
Deputy Prime Minister and Finance Minister Choi Sang-mok, who succeeded Han as acting president upon the impeachment, warned prior to the 27 December vote that impeaching Han would seriously affect South Korea's economic standing and called on opposition parties to reconsider. Choi Sang-mok stated "The most important thing right now is to minimize the confusion in state affairs, the government will do its best to stabilize them."

After his impeachment was overturned, Han reported to his office on 24 March and expressed appreciation to the Constitutional Court for its ruling and pledged to "do my best to ensure that South Korea continues to develop in this era of great geopolitical transformation". He also issued an appeal for national unity, saying that "I believe that there is no longer left or right. What matters most is how the country moves forward". The presidential office also welcomed Han's acquittal, saying that the decision "reaffirms that excessive impeachments by the National Assembly are reckless and malicious political offensives". PPP leader Kweon Seong-dong called on the opposition to "apologise to the people for paralysing state affairs for 87 days with a hasty impeachment bid", which he said was politically motivated.

The DPK expressed regret over Han's acquittal, with the party's floor leader Park Chan-dae saying that "The court made it clear that it is unconstitutional not to appoint the three Constitutional Court justices recommended by the National Assembly". Speaker Woo Won-shik said he respected the ruling, while urging Han to appoint Ma Eun-hyuk in order to fill the remaining vacancy in the Constitutional Court.

== Opinion polling ==
Opinion polling with a sampling size of a thousand released by The Korea Times and Hankook Research on 31 December 2024 found that 61% of respondents supported Han's impeachment (45% strongly approved) while 36% were opposed. By political party affiliation, 95% of DPK supporters, 96% of Rebuilding Korea Party supporters, and 80% of Progressive Party supporters favored Han's impeachment. PPP supporters accounted for 87% of those opposed to Han's impeachment. By age, 60–70% of respondents in all age groups under 60 years of age supported the impeachment, while over 50% of those aged 60 or older opposed it. A poll by Opinion Research Justice released that same day found 52.2% of the respondents in support of Han's impeachment.

Following the impeachments of Han Duck-soo and Yoon Suk Yeol, another survey by Hankook Research found 56% of the total respondents supported "amending the Constitution to reform the current single, five-year presidential term", while 39% opposed it. Sixty-four percent of the respondents supported limiting "the number of times the president can exercise veto power." Seventeen percent of the respondents cited "the need to improve the current electoral system, which allows a candidate to win the presidency without securing a majority of the vote".
