= Chung Kyesun =

South Korean judge (born 1969)

- 정계선
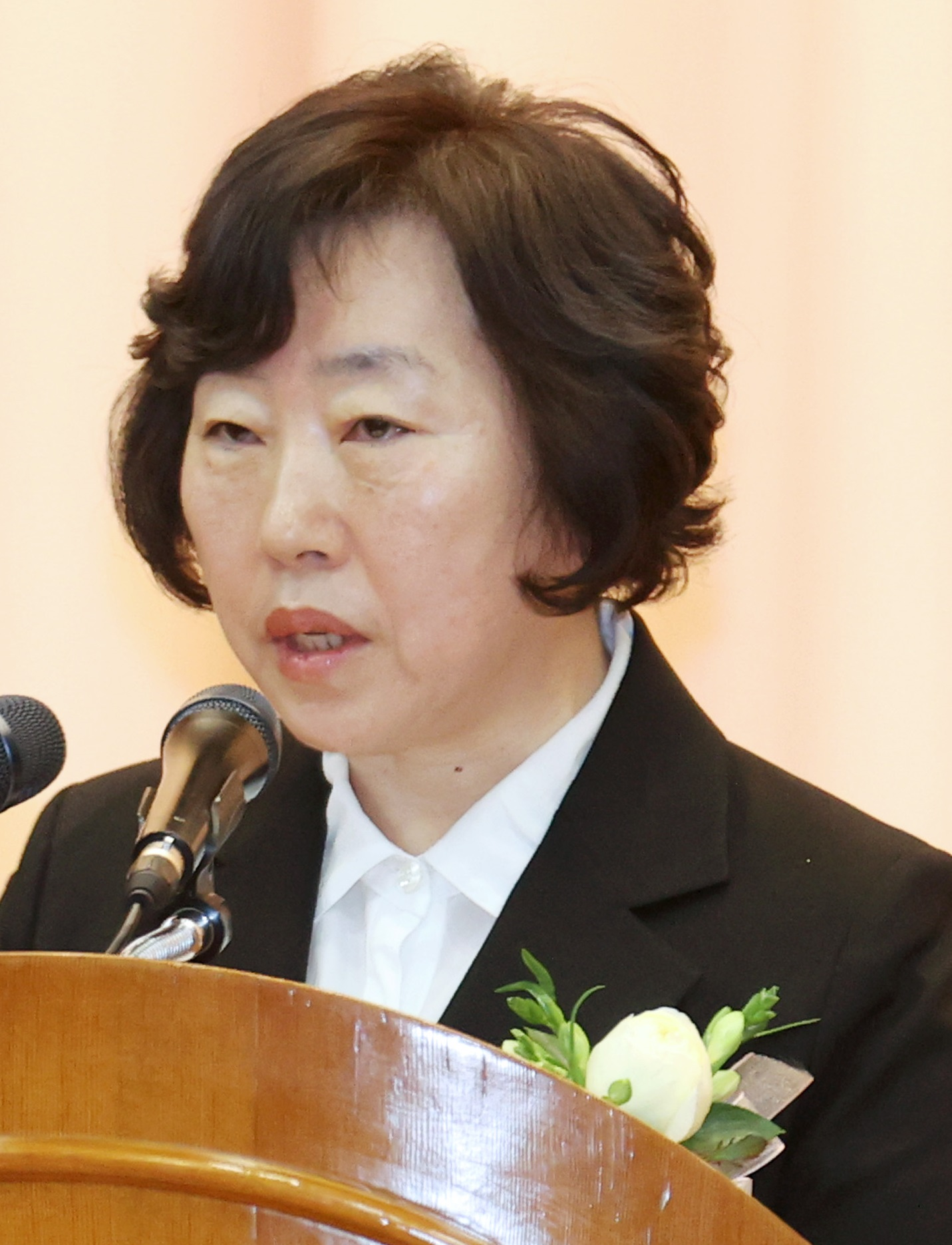

Justice of the Constitutional Court of Korea
- Incumbent
- Assumed office January 1, 2025
- Nominated by: National Assembly (with recommendation from Democratic Party)
- Appointed by: Choi Sang-mok

Personal details
- Born: August 2, 1969 (age 56) Chungju, South Korea
- Education: Seoul National University (LL.B.)

Korean name
- Hangul: 정계선
- Hanja: 鄭桂先
- RR: Jeong Gyeseon
- MR: Chŏng Kyesŏn

Chung Kyesun (Korean: 정계선; born August 2, 1969) is a South Korean jurist who serves as a justice of the Constitutional Court of Korea. She was nominated by the National Assembly on December 26, 2024, upon the recommendation of the Democratic Party and officially appointed to the court by acting national president Choi Sang-mok on December 31, 2024. She is the first woman appointed to the Constitutional Court on the recommendation of the National Assembly, all other women previously being recommended by the Chief Justice of the Supreme Court or the President themselves.

== Early life and education ==
Chung was born on August 2, 1969. Despite several conflicting press reports on her birthplace, such as Yangyang, Gangwon, she explained that her birthplace was Chungju, Chungbuk. She grew up with two younger siblings, a sister and a brother, and graduated from Chungju Girls' High School. In 1987, she moved to Seoul where she enrolled in Seoul National University's medical school. After watching the film ...And Justice for All, she decided to go to law school; her interest in the law was also inspired by a biography of Jeon Tae-il. In 1993, she graduated from the Seoul National University College of Law. In 1995, she passed the 37th bar examination with the highest score.

== Early judicial career ==
Chung began her judicial career as a trainee judge for the Seoul District Court in 1998. Starting in 2000, she served as a judge for the Seoul Administrative Court, Chungju Branch of the Cheongju District Court, Goyang Branch of the Uijeongbu District Court, and Seoul Southern District Court. In 2010, she served as a judge for the Seoul High Court and a dispatch to the Constitutional Court. She was then promoted to chief judge for the Ulsan District Court in 2013 and served as a professor for the Judicial Research and Training Institute in 2015. From 2017 to 2024, she served as a chief judge for courts in Seoul including the Seoul Central District Court, Seoul Western District Court, and Seoul Southern District Court.

During her time at the Seoul Central District Court in 2018, she was appointed the first female judge to specialize in corruption and bribery cases. In this capacity, she presided over the trial of former president Lee Myung-bak on embezzlement charges and sentenced Lee to fifteen years in prison with a fine of 13 billion won. Chung has also served as the president of Our Law Research Association and the International Human Rights Law Research Association.

== Constitutional Court of South Korea (2025–present) ==
On December 4, 2024, the Democratic Party announced they were recommending Chung for appointment to the Constitutional Court. On December 23, the National Assembly held a confirmation hearing for Chung that was boycotted by the People Power Party. The National Assembly voted to approve Chung's nomination on December 26. On December 31, acting president Choi Sang-mok officially appointed Chung to the court. Chung's term began on January 1, 2025.

Chung was the only justice to vote in favor of upholding the impeachment of prime minister and acting president Han Duck-soo on 24 March 2025.

== See also ==
- List of justices of the Constitutional Court of Korea

Legal offices
Preceded by Kim Kiyoung	Justice of the Constitutional Court of Korea; 2025–present	Incumbent
