= Moon Hyung-bae =

South Korean judge (born 1966)

- 문형배
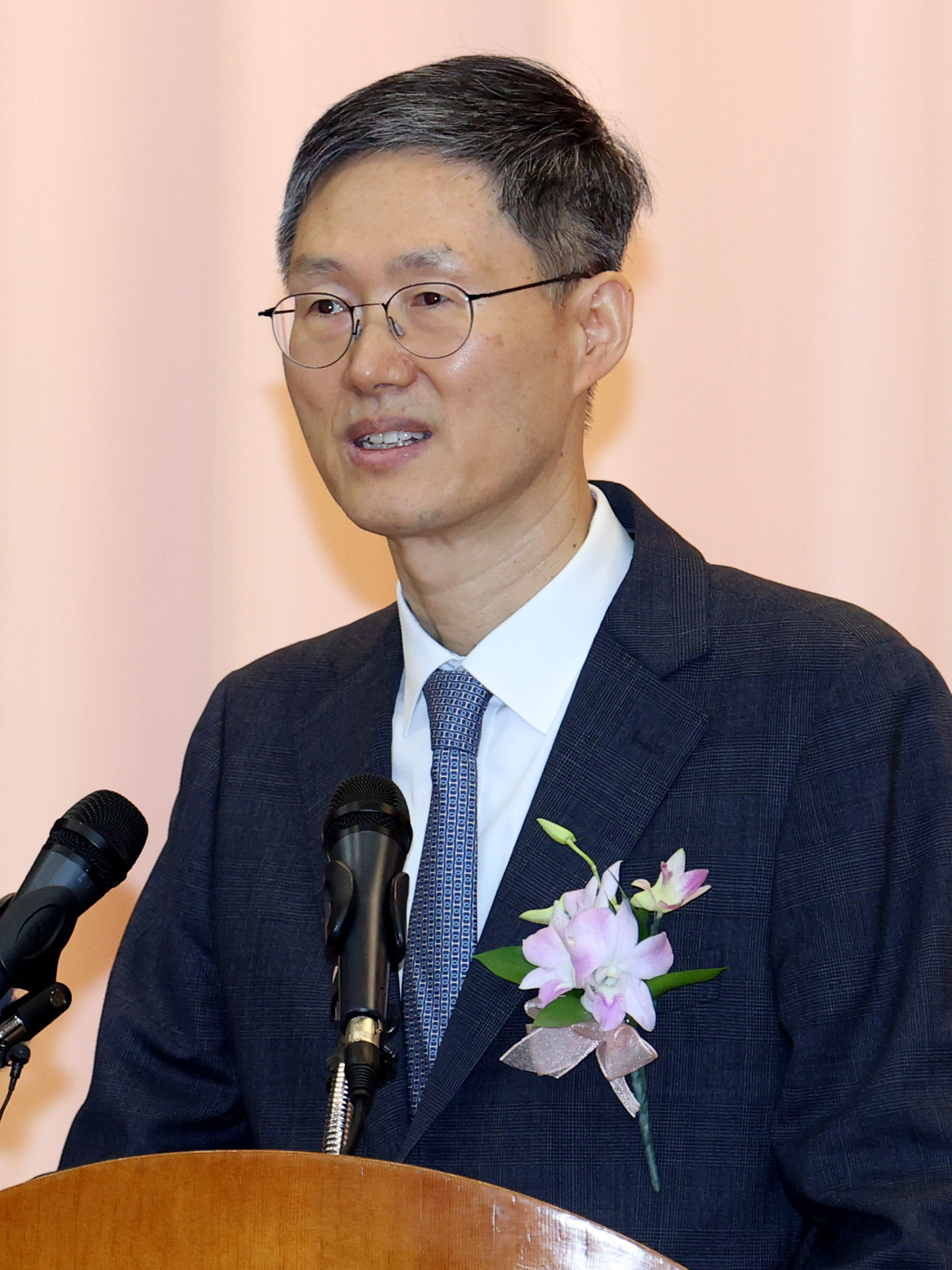
- Photo in his retirement ceremony, 2025

President of the Constitutional Court of Korea
- Acting; 18 October 2024 – 18 April 2025
- Preceded by: Lee Jong-seok
- Succeeded by: Kim Hyungdu

Justice of the Constitutional Court of Korea
- In office 19 April 2019 – 18 April 2025
- Appointed by: Moon Jae-in

Personal details
- Born: 2 February 1965 (age 61)
- Education: Seoul National University (LLB)

Korean name
- Hangul: 문형배
- Hanja: 文炯培
- RR: Mun Hyeongbae
- MR: Mun Hyŏngbae

Moon Hyung-bae (Korean: 문형배; born 2 February 1965) is a South Korean judge. He was named a Justice of the Constitutional Court of Korea in 2019. He was responsible for reading the verdict on the impeachment of Yoon Suk Yeol on 4 April 2025, which led to Yoon's removal as President of South Korea.

== Biography ==
Moon is the eldest son of a farming family in a small village in Hadong County, South Gyeongsang, in 1965. He grew up in poverty and managed to finish his education after receiving a scholarship from Jinju-based traditional Korean medicine practitioner and philanthropist Kim Jang-ha. Moon graduated from Jinju Daea High School and earned his bachelor's degree in law from Seoul National University before passing the bar examinations in 1986.

== Career ==
- 1987 Seoul National University College of Law
- 1989 Admitted to Bar
- 1992 Judge, Busan District Court
- 2004 Judge, Changwon District Court
- 2012 Presiding Judge, Busan High Court
- 2016 Chief Judge, Busan Family Court
- 2019–2025 Justice of the Constitutional Court of Korea
- 2024–2025 Acting President of the Constitutional Court of Korea

Legal offices
Preceded by Cho Yong-ho	Justice of the Constitutional Court of Korea; 2019–2025	Succeeded by Kim Sanghwan
Preceded by Lee Jongseok	President of the Constitutional Court of Korea; Acting; 2024–2025	Succeeded by Kim Hyungdu as Acting
