= Kim Kiyoung =

South Korean judge (born 1968)

- 김기영
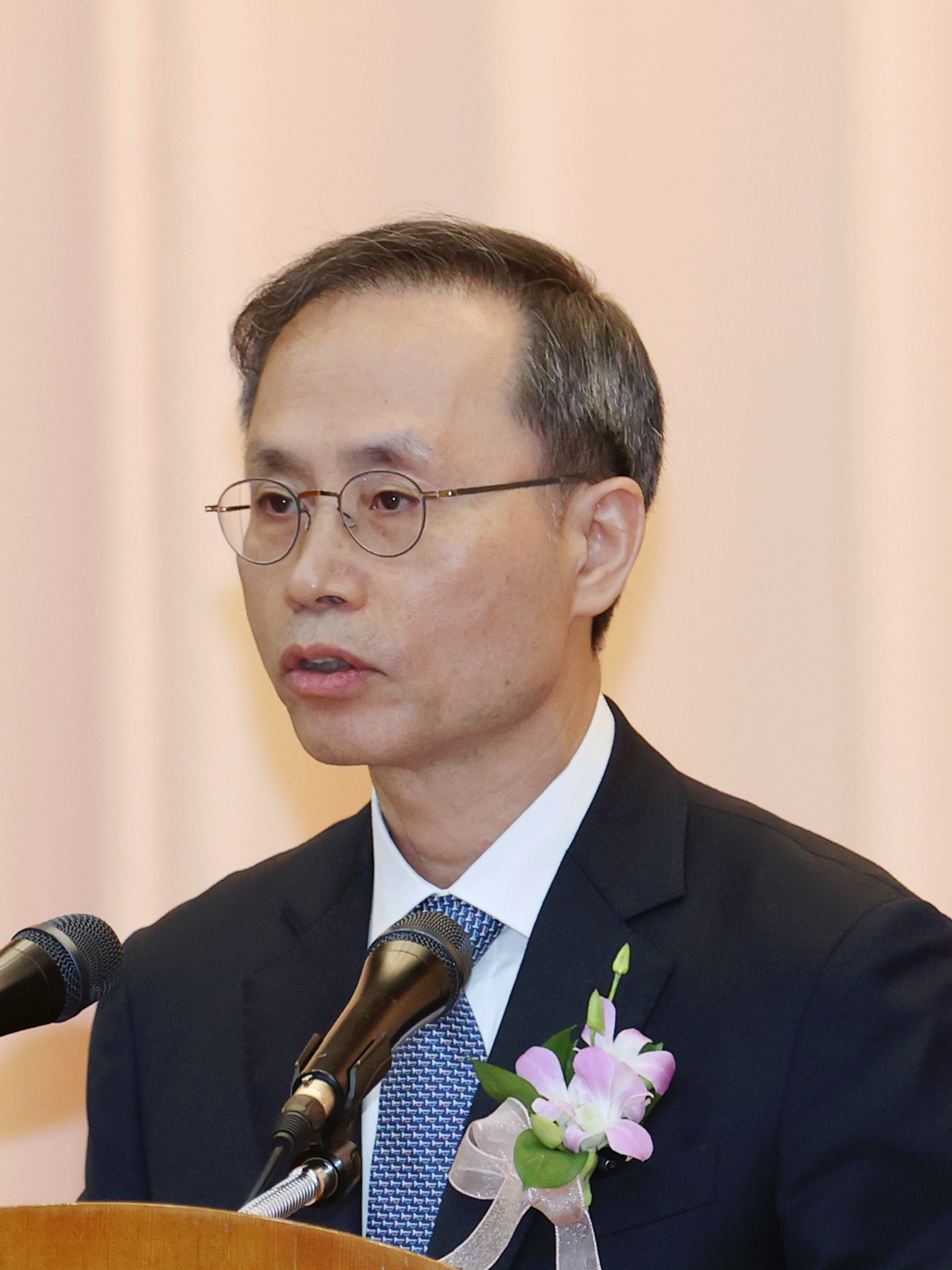
- Kim in 2024

Justice of the Constitutional Court of Korea
- In office 18 October 2018 – 17 October 2024

Personal details
- Born: 9 April 1968 (age 58) Hongseong-gun, Chungcheongnam-do, South Korea
- Education: Seoul National University (LL.B.)

Kim Kiyoung (Korean: 김기영; born 9 April 1968) is a South Korean judge. He was appointed to Justice of the Constitutional Court of Korea in 2018.

== Career ==
- 1996 Judge, Incheon District Court
- 1998 Judge, Seoul District Court Bukbu Branch
- 2000 Judge, Daejeon District Court Seosan Branch
- 2000 Overseas training (Duke University, U.S.)
- 2001 Judge, Daejeon District Court Nonsan Branch
- 2003 Judge, Patent Court
- 2007 Judge, Seoul Central District Court
- 2009 Presiding Judge, Gwangju District Court
- 2010 Presiding Judge, Suwon District Court Ansan Branch
- 2012 Presiding Judge, Seoul Southern District Court
- 2014 Presiding Judge, Seoul Central District Court
- 2017 Presiding Judge, Seoul Eastern District Court
- 2018 Chief Presiding Judge, Seoul Eastern District Court
- 2018~2024 Justice of the Constitutional Court of Korea

Legal offices
Preceded by Kim Yi-su	Justice of the Constitutional Court of Korea; 2018–2024	Succeeded by Chung Kyesun
