= Cho Yong-ho =

South Korean judge (born 1955)

Cho Yong-Ho
- 조용호
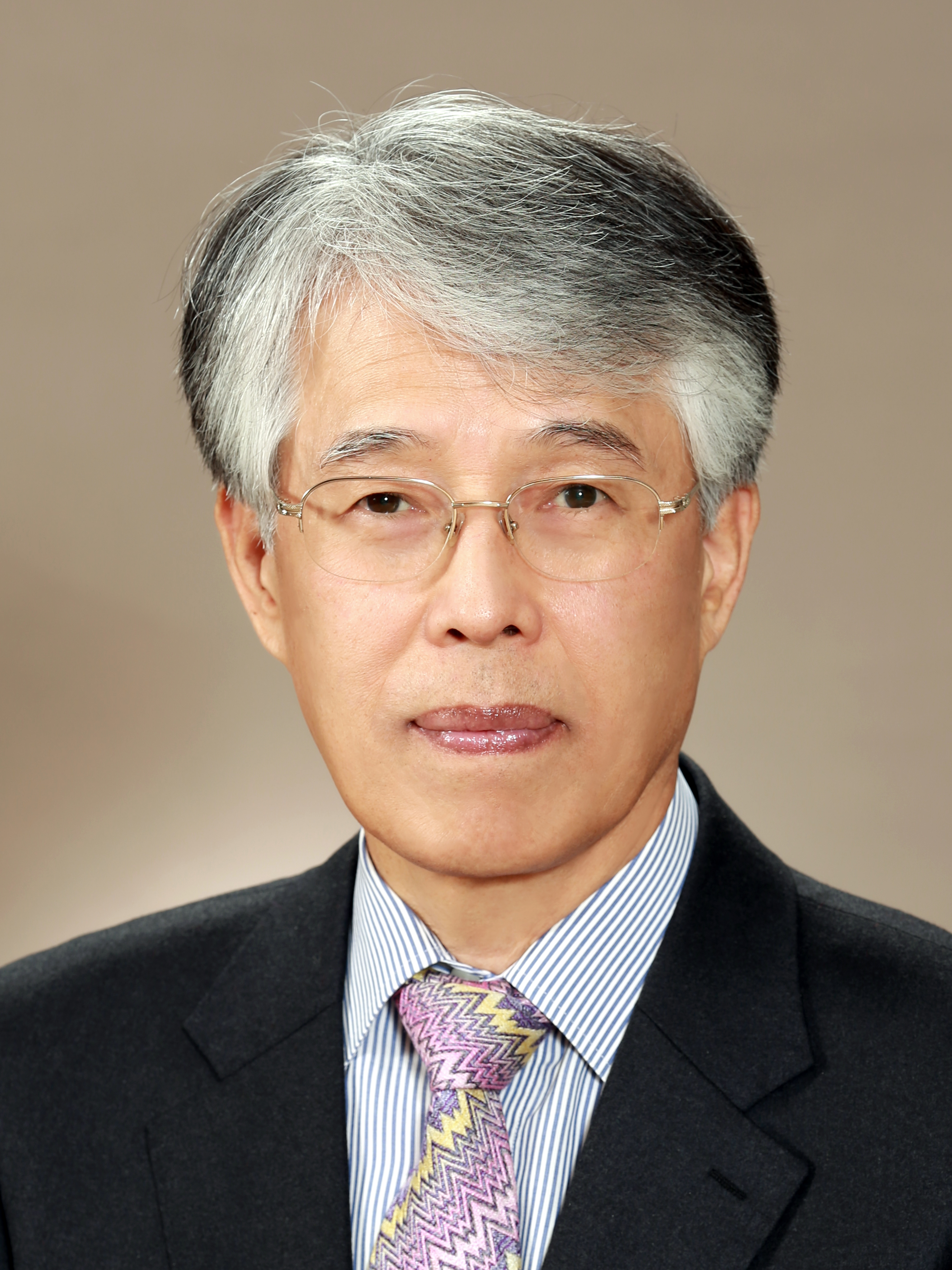

Justice of the Constitutional Court of Korea
- In office 19 April 2013 – April 2019

Personal details
- Born: 15 February 1955 (age 71)
- Education: Konkuk University (LL.B., LL.M., J.S.D.)

Cho Yong-ho (Korean: 조용호; born 15 February 1955) is a South Korean judge, serving as a Justice of the Constitutional Court of Korea from April 2013 to April 2019.

== Professional life ==
Born in Cheongyang, South Chungcheong Province, Cho Young (born February 15, 1955) graduated from the Department of Law at Konkuk University. He passed the 20th Bar Examination and was a member of the 10th Class. He was promoted to Chief Judge in 1999 and served as Chief Judge of the Chuncheon District Court. In February 2009, he became Chief Justice of the Seoul Southern District Court; in February 2010, Chief Justice of the Gwangju High Court; in 2011, Chief Justice of the Seoul High Court; in 2012, and Chief Justice of the Seoul High Court in 2013. In April 2013, he became a judge of the Constitutional Court upon the recommendation of President Park Geun-hye.

In 2009, when he was president of the Chuncheon District Court, court staff petitioned the Supreme Court to select a candidate for the position of Supreme Court judge at the confirmation hearing at the Constitutional Court. Allegations of land speculation were raised in Seosan, South Chungcheong Province. “My wife was responsible for the family,” he said at the time. “As the head of the family, I feel deeply responsible for the dire consequences that resulted.”

== Main provisions ==
On September 28, 1989, while serving as a judge of the 3rd Criminal Division of the Suwon District Court, he sentenced a union leader arrested on charges of violating the Labor Dispute Settlement Law to imprisonment for one year and six months. On October 5, workers in the Suwon and Yongin areas gathered for a demonstration to condemn the repression of the Samsung union and demand a democratic union. He wrote and distributed leaflets with the message, "Let's stand up boldly after seeing the emotional struggle of the Samsung Heavy Industries brothers." The defendant, a dismissed employee of Samsung Electronics, was also sentenced to imprisonment for one year and six months, respectively, on charges of manipulating and inciting the establishment of a union at Samsung Electronics as a third party in violation of the Labor Dispute Settlement Act.

In April 2000, while serving as Chief Judge of the 11th Administrative District of the Seoul District Court Administrative Division, the court ruled in favor of the plaintiff in a lawsuit. He filed a lawsuit against the Seoul Regional Military Manpower Administration seeking to cancel the call-up order for public service workers, citing his father's acquittal. Mr. Kim, 23, was acquitted on the grounds that he had taken the dental licensing exam to continue practicing dentistry in the United States. He was officially preparing to emigrate, and his son's emigration followed after he discovered late that he could also emigrate during the emigration process. It did not appear to be a fake emigration to evade military service.

On July 23, 2001, a former public servant whose personal information was to be disclosed filed a lawsuit after a final fine for youth prostitution, filing suit against the Youth Protection Committee and demanding that his personal information not be disclosed. The court noted that "youth prostitution must be punished, but if personal information is disclosed, there is concern that this will affect the human rights not only of the person himself, but also of his family and those around him, and therefore it is unconstitutional". On October 21, Dong said, "It is unfair to seize the company's assets due to tax arrears after declaring bankruptcy". The court ruled in favor of the plaintiff, stating: "According to the current bankruptcy law, the tax authorities cannot confiscate a bankrupt company. Due to tax arrears after declaring bankruptcy, the tax office must cancel the seizure made after declaring bankruptcy".

On January 25, 2005, while serving as presiding judge of the 5th Civil Circuit of the Seoul High Court, in a lawsuit seeking damages filed by the Korea Music Copyright Association against brothers Yang Jung-hwan and Yang Il-hwan, who developed and provided services for Soribada, the court ruled in part in favor of the plaintiff, stating that "Suripada should be held liable for the damages suffered by the plaintiff from June 2000 to July 2002". It awarded 19.6 million won in damages, contrary to the original court ruling, and held that "Suribada should bear responsibility only for damages incurred by the plaintiff after July 2000, when the concept of digital reproduction was introduced into the Copyright Law". He must pay 19.1 million won in damages.

On December 29, in a lawsuit seeking compensation filed by the family of Professor Choi Jong-gil against the state, the 23rd Civil Agreements Division of the Seoul Central District Court (Presiding Judge Lee Hyuk-woo) annulled the original ruling. In January 2005, the court ruled in favor of the plaintiff, stating that “the statute of limitations had expired,” ordered mandatory mediation, and ordered the payment of 500 million won to each of Professor Choi Jong-gil's wife and son, 300 million won to his daughter, and 50 million won to each of Professor Choi Jong-gil's five siblings.

On September 19, 2007, while serving as president of the Fifth Special Division of the Seoul High Court, the court ruled in favor of the plaintiff in a lawsuit filed against the Secretary of Justice to revoke the probation renewal of Muhammad Kancho Jong So-il, who obtained Philippine citizenship through money laundering. He had been caught spying while working as a part-time lecturer and assistant professor at a local university in the 1980s and 1990s. The plaintiff argued, "There is no longer any danger of committing the crime that requires probation again, so the probation period should be revoked".

== Career ==
- 1983: Judge, Daejeon District Court
- 1986: Judge, Seosan Branch of Daejeon District Court
- 1989: Judge, Suwon District Court
- 1990: Judge, Seoul High Court
- 1993: Research Judge, Supreme Court
- 1997: Senior Judge, Uijeongbu Branch of Seoul District Court
- 1998: Senior Judge, Suwon District Court
- 1998: Senior Judge, Eastern Branch of Seoul District Court
- 1999: Senior Judge, Seoul Administrative Court
- 2002: Senior Judge, Patent Court
- 2004: Senior Judge, Seoul High Court
- 2009: Chief Judge, Chuncheon District Court
- 2010: Chief Judge, Seoul Southern District Court
- 2011: Chief Judge, Gwangju High Court
- 2012: Senior Judge, Seoul High Court
- 2013: Chief Judge, Seoul High Court
- 2013–present: Justice, Constitutional Court (since 19 April 2013)

Legal offices
Preceded by Lee Kang-kook	Justice of the Constitutional Court of Korea; 2013–2019	Succeeded by Moon Hyungbae
