= Bomoon High School =

Bomoon High School 보문고등학교(普文高等學校)
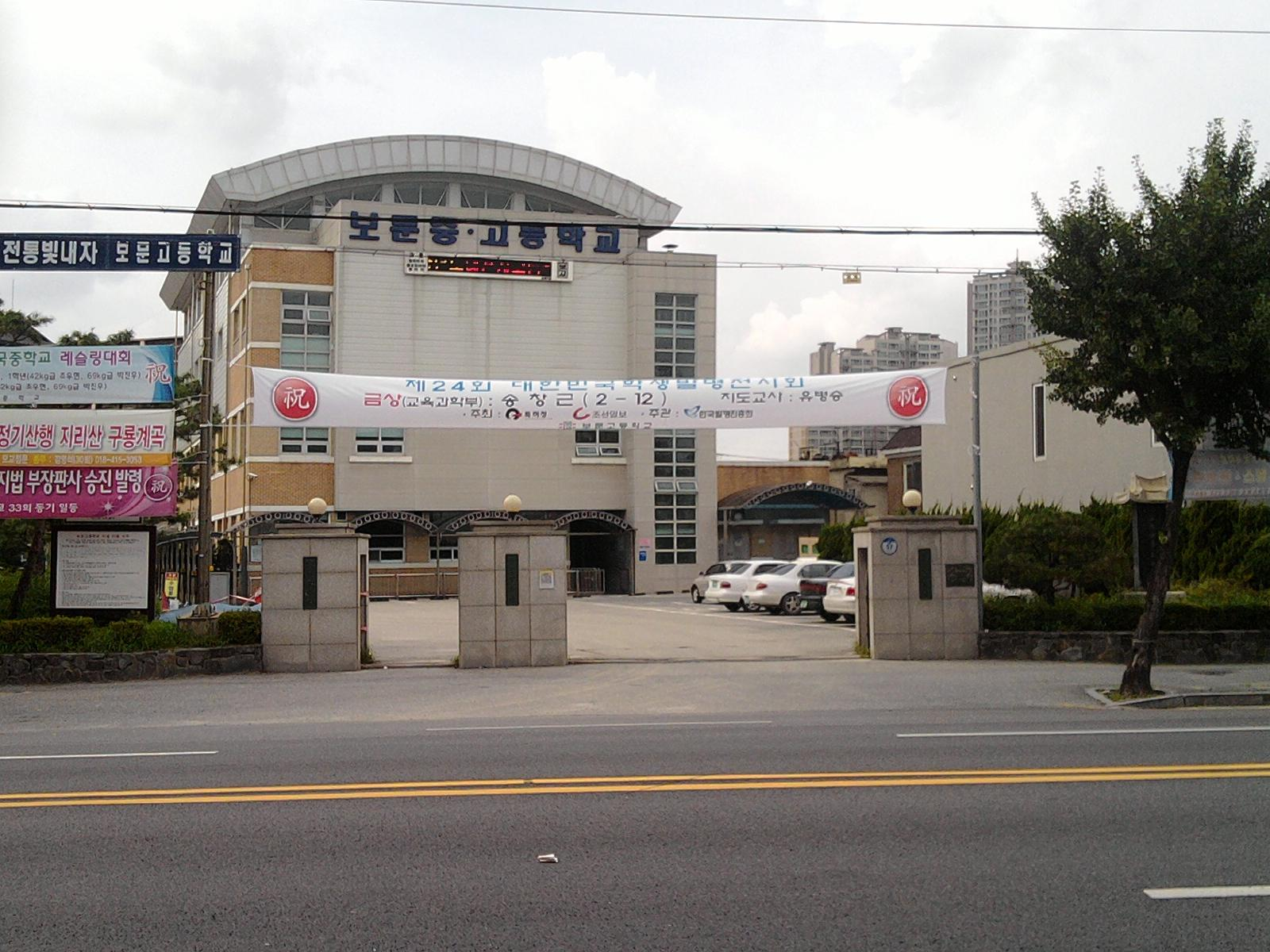

Location
- Daejeon; Korea, Republic of
- Coordinates: 36°20′13″N 127°25′25″E

Information
- Type: Private
- Established: 1946
- Website: Official website

Bomoon High School is located in Sam-Sung-Dong, Daejeon, in South Korea. The school shares its grounds with Bomoon Middle School. It is not too far from the old downtown area of the city.

Bomoon High School is a private school and the only Buddhist school in the city. The school’s motto is "Be true. Be of use. To the end". The school is symbolized by the juniper tree and the magnolia flower. There are various clubs at the school, for instance, Paramita which sees its members participate in religious activities, a literature studies club, and there is a Chinese literature research society.

It was built on September 25, 1946 by Jeon Se-Jin. From only six classes in 1953, the number increased to 18 by 1970. Then, in 1984, a sisterhood relationship with Nagoya-Odani High School in Japan was established. Throughout the 1990s, the school continued to be developed as it increased in size. By the end of 1991, there were 30 classes in total. The main hall and the Buddhist sanctuary were completed on November 24, 1995. It also opened its library which has 208 seats on August 7, 1997, and a multipurpose room on February 2, 2005. The school currently has 36 classes.

== Notable alumni ==
- Kim Sanghwan. 9th President of the Constitutional Court of Korea.
