= Park Han-hee =

South Korean lawyer

Park Han-hee (Korean: 박한희) is a South Korean lawyer, human right activist and transgender woman. She is the first openly transgender lawyer in South Korea and an alumna of the law school at Seoul National University (SNU).
