= President of the Constitutional Court of Korea =

Head of South Korean constitutional court

- 대한민국 헌법재판소장 (Korean)
- Emblem of the Constitutional Court

- Flag of the Constitutional Court of Korea

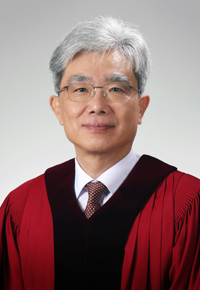
- Incumbent; Kim Sang-hwan since 24 July 2025
- Constitutional Court of Korea
- Style: Your Honor
- Status: Chief Justice
- Member of: Council of Constitutional Court Justices
- Residence: Heonbeopjaepansojang Gonggwan
- Seat: Jongno, Seoul
- Appointer: President (Subject to the National Assembly's approval)
- Term length: Six years
- Constituting instrument: Constitution of South Korea
- Inaugural holder: Cho Kyu-kwang
- Formation: 1 September 1988; 38 years ago
- Website: Official english website

The president of the Constitutional Court of Korea (Korean: 헌법재판소장; Hanja: 憲法裁判所長; RR: Heonbeopjaepansojang) is the chief justice of the Constitutional Court of Korea. As presiding judge of a full bench composed of nine justices, the president represents the Constitutional Court of Korea.

The president of the Constitutional Court of Korea is regarded as one of two equivalent heads of judicial branch in Government of South Korea. The second is the Chief Justice of the Supreme Court of South Korea. The equivalent status of the president of the Constitutional Court to the chief justice is guaranteed by article 15 of Constitutional Court Act. Kim Sang-hwan is the current president of the Constitutional Court of Korea.

== Appointment ==
Under chapter 6, article 111(4) of Constitution and article 12(1) of Constitutional Court Act, the president of the Constitutional Court of Korea is appointed by the president of South Korea from among the nine justices of Constitutional Court, with the consent of the National Assembly of South Korea.

Since the president is selected among nine justices, and the article 112(1) of Constitution states that the 'term of the Justices shall be renewable six years' yet does not precisely state the exact length of a president's term, the presidents who were newly appointed as both justice and the president at the same time can serve a full six-year term, though the presidents who were appointed while serving as a Constitutional Court justice can only serve the remainder of their six-year term as justice. It is noteworthy that no president has tried to renew their term because it could harm the independence of the court and judiciary. Under article 7(2) of Constitutional Court Act, the president cannot be older than age 70 as other justices.

== Duties ==
The president's main role is participating in judgment of the court as one of nine Constitutional Court justices. According to article 22 of Constitutional Court Act, every cases shall be assigned to the Full bench (Korean: 전원재판부) composed of all nine Constitutional Court justices in principle. In this case, the president becomes presiding judge following article 22(2) of the act. However, some cases can be dismissed in pre-trial stage, due to lack of claim upon which relief can be granted. Whether or not to dismiss in pre-trial stage is called 'prior review (Korean: 사전심사)' under article 72(1) and 72(3) of the act and is decided unanimously by a panel (Korean: 지정재판부) which consists of three Constitutional Court justices. As there are three panels in the court, the president is also part of one panel

Another role of the president is to supervise judicial administration inside the court. Since the Constitutional Court of Korea has no lower courts, as it is designed to be the one and only court to rule on important constitutional cases including judicial review, its volume of administration tasks is smaller than that of Supreme Court Chief Justice. Likewise, the president has no power to intervene in the appointment of other Constitutional Court justices, while the Supreme Court chief justice can intervene in appointments due to his power to recommend candidates for Supreme Court justices. This difference attenuates the hierarchical aspect within the Constitutional Court, granting more substantial power on Council of Constitutional Court to the justices (Korean: 재판관회의) rather than the president.

- The president serves as chair at the Council of Constitutional Court justices, composed of all nine Constitutional Court justices including the president, which supervises administrative tasks of the court under article 17 of Constitutional Court Act.
- The president appoints secretary general and the deputy of Department of Court Administration (Korean: 헌법재판소사무처) with consent of the Council under article 16(4) of Constitutional Court Act, which supervises administrative tasks inside the court under 17 of the act.
- The president also appoints Rapporteur Judges (Korean: 헌법연구관, who have a similar role as French Conseiller référendaire) and court officials above grade III with consent of the Council under article 16(4) of Constitutional Court Act. Otherwise, appointment of court officials below grade III does not necessarily require consent of the council.
- The president present written opinions to the National Assembly, on enacting or revising laws related to administration of the Constitutional Court, under article 10-2 of Constitutional Court Act.

== List of presidents ==
No.	Name	Tenure		Appointed by	Education
1	Cho Kyu-kwang	15 September 1988	14 September 1994	Roh Tae-woo	Seoul National University
2	Kim Yong-joon	15 September 1994	14 September 2000	Kim Young-sam	Seoul National University
3	Yun Young-chul	15 September 2000	14 September 2006	Kim Dae-jung	Seoul National University
-	Choo Sun-hoe (acting president)	15 September 2006	21 January 2007	following the retirement of president Yun Young-chul	Korea University
4	Lee Kang-kook	22 January 2007	21 January 2013	Roh Moo-hyun	Seoul National University
-	Song Doo-hwan (acting president)	22 January 2013	22 March 2013	following the retirement of president Lee Kang-kook	Seoul National University
-	Lee Jung-mi (acting president)	23 March 2013	11 April 2013	following the retirement of justice Song Doo-hwan	Korea University
5	Park Han-chul	12 April 2013	31 January 2017	Park Geun-hye	Seoul National University
-	Lee Jung-mi (acting president)	1 February 2017	13 March 2017	following the retirement of president Park Han-chul	Korea University
-	Kim Yi-su (acting president)	14 March 2017	23 November 2017	following the retirement of justice Lee Jung-mi	Seoul National University
6	Lee Jin-sung	24 November 2017	19 September 2018	Moon Jae-in	Seoul National University
7	Yoo Nam-seok	21 September 2018	10 November 2023	Moon Jae-in	Seoul National University
-	Lee Eunae (acting president)	11 November 2023	29 November 2023	following the retirement of the president Yoo Nam-seok	Seoul National University
8	Lee Jong-seok	30 November 2023	17 October 2024	Yoon Suk-yeol	Seoul National University
-	Moon Hyungbae (acting president)	18 October 2024	17 April 2025	following the retirement of the president Lee Jong-seok	Seoul National University
-	Kim Hyungdu (acting president)	18 April 2025	23 July 2025	following the retirement of the president Moon Hyungbae	Seoul National University
9	Kim Sang-hwan	24 July 2025	Incumbent	Lee Jae Myung	Seoul National University

== See also ==
- Constitutional Court of Korea
- Judiciary of South Korea
- Rapporteur Judge
