= Judiciary of South Korea =

Judicial branch of the Republic of Korea

Organizational chart for judicial system in Government of the Republic of Korea

The judiciary of South Korea (Korean: 대한민국 사법부, 대한민국의 사법기관) is the judicial branch (사법부) of the South Korean central government, established by Chapters 5 and 6 of the Constitution of South Korea.

Under Chapter 5, the Constitution defines ordinary courts for all cases except those involving constitutional review. It also defines military courts as extraordinary courts for military justice matters. Both ordinary courts and military courts have the Supreme Court of Korea as their highest court.

Generally, ordinary courts have a three-level hierarchy with independent judges, 14 Supreme Court Justices by statute, and one Chief Justice of the Supreme Court among the justices. Military courts, on the other hand, are organized only in the first instance of a three-level hierarchy at peacetime. Their final appellate always falls under the jurisdiction of the Supreme Court, even in wartime.

Under Chapter 6 of the Constitution, the Constitutional Court of Korea is defined as the highest court on matters of constitutional review, including judicial review, impeachment, and dissolution of unconstitutional political parties; competence dispute among government agencies; and Constitutional complaint. It comprises nine justices by the constitution and one President of Constitutional court among the justices.

The Chief Justice of the Supreme Court and the President of Constitutional Court are treated as two equivalent heads of the judiciary branch in South Korea by Article 15 of the Constitutional Court Act. However, since relationship between the Supreme Court and the Constitutional Court is not thoroughly defined anywhere in Constitution of South Korea and other related statutes, these two highest courts of South Korea have sometimes struggled against each other with regard to jurisdiction.

== Institutional traits ==
=== Diversified supreme courts ===
As influenced from European judiciaries such as the Austrian judicial system and German judicial system, the contemporary South Korean judiciary divides its role of highest court into two apex courts.

- Supreme Court of Korea: as the highest ordinary court of South Korea, the Supreme Court of Korea has comprehensive final appellate jurisdiction over every case except constitutional matters.
- Constitutional Court of Korea: the constitutional court has original jurisdiction over major constitutional matters including judicial review on constitutionality of statute, review of all impeachments, decisions on prohibition and dissolution of political parties, competence disputes on demarcation of power among central government agencies and local governments, and adjudication of constitutional complaints.

=== American-style legal education ===
Before South Korea adopted the American law school system (법학전문대학원) in 2007, South Korea trained its legal professionals mainly by the Judicial Research and Training Institute (JRTI, 사법연수원). The trainees at JRTI were selected by a nationwide exam on jurisprudence called the 'Judicial exam' (사법시험). These trainees were commonly trained and competed against each other in the JRTI for 2 years, as their career option after graduation was restricted according to graduation records of JRTI. Another route for legal professionals was direct recruitment by the South Korean Armed Forces as Judge Advocates (군법무관).

After the 2007 reform, all legal professionals in South Korea (except paralegals such as judicial scriveners) have since been trained by the American-style three-year law school system.

== Ordinary courts ==
The ordinary courts (일반법원 or 법원), of South Korea are established by Chapter 5 of the Constitution. All ordinary courts are under the jurisdiction of the national judiciary. These ordinary courts are divided into the Supreme Court and other lower courts under Article 101(2) of the Constitution. The Constitution itself does not exactly guarantee a three-level instance system; Article 101(2) states, according to the Constitutional Court, that final appellate jurisdiction of ordinary cases should always be with the Supreme Court. Thus, enacting some cases outside of the Constitutional Court's jurisdiction as available with only one chance of appeal or no chance of appeal is constitutionally valid in South Korea unless such cases are finally ruled in the Supreme Court.

The statutory ground for the hierarchy of ordinary courts, including a three-tiered instance system for typical cases, is defined by the Court Organization Act of South Korea. Under article 3(1), 28, and 28-4 of the Court Organization Act, the hierarchy of ordinary courts in South Korea has three levels: District Courts (plus family court, bankruptcy court, and administrative court, which are specialized courts on matters of family, bankruptcy and administration laws), High Courts (plus patent court which is specialized appellate court on intellectual property matters, for reviewing ruling or decision made by the 'Intellectual Property Trial And Appeal Board'), and the Supreme Court. The other lower courts at specified levels of article 101(2) of the Constitution are divided into six courts, making a total of 7: Supreme Court, High Court, Patent Court, District Court, Family Court, Administrative Court, and Bankruptcy Court. Branch courts and municipal courts are regarded as part of District Court and Family Court under article 3(2) of the Act.

=== Supreme Court of Korea ===
South Korean Supreme Court building in Seocho, Seoul

The Supreme Court (대법원), seated in Seocho-gu, Seoul, consists of 14 Supreme Court Justices, including one Chief Justice.

The Chief Justice of the Supreme Court is appointed by the President of South Korea with the consent of the National Assembly and has authority over administration of all ordinary courts. Other Justices are also appointed by President of South Korea with consent from the National Assembly, though candidates for new Justices are recommended by the Chief Justice.

Justices and the Chief Justice must be at least 45 years old and must have at least 20 years of experience practicing law with a license of attorney at law. Justices cannot be older than 70. They serve for six-year terms. The Chief Justice cannot be reappointed, but the terms of the other Justices are renewable under article 105(2) of the Constitution. However, no Justices have tried to renew their term in the Sixth Republic since it could harm the independence of judiciary by increasing the influence of the president.

==== Judges in Research Division ====
Justices in the Supreme Court are assisted by seconded Judges from sub-Supreme courts called Judges in Research Division (재판연구관) or Research Judges. This secondment is decided by the Chief Justice of Supreme Court. Under Article 44 of Court Organization Act, the Chief Justice has the power to transfer every single Judge from one of ordinary courts to any other ordinary court in South Korea.

The function of seconded Judges in Supreme Court is similar to law clerks in ordinary courts; they serve about 2 years as judicial assistant for Justices, yet not all seconded Judges are not individually attached to one of Justice, as some of seconded Judges serve in research groups or panels to assist decisions of whole Supreme Court.

==== National court administration ====
Administration affairs (including fiscal, personnel, and human resource affairs) of all ordinary courts in South Korea are governed by an institution called the National Court Administration (NCA, 법원행정처) which is established in the Supreme Court under Article 19 of the Court Organization Act. The head of the NCA is appointed by a Chief Justice and among Justices. Though this centralized power on the Chief Justice can eventually harm independence of individual judges and even Justices, the NCA also serves for judicial independence from other branches of government.

=== High Courts and District Courts ===
Below the Supreme Court are appellate courts which are called High Courts (고등법원). They are stationed in six of the country's major cities. High Courts typically consist of a panel of three judges.

Below the High Courts are District Courts (지방법원) and its Branch Courts (지방법원 지원) which exist in most of the large cities of South Korea.

Below the District Courts and Branch Courts are Municipal Courts (시·군법원) positioned all over the country. They are limited to small claims and petty offenses. Municipal courts usually do not have jurisdiction over criminal cases. Specialized courts (전문법원) also exist for family, administrative, bankruptcy and patent cases.

==== Judges ====
Judges (판사), except Supreme Court Justices and the Chief Justice, serve in ordinary courts and are appointed by the Chief Justice with the consent of the Council of Supreme Court Justices. Judges serve for 10-year renewable terms up to age of 65.

After the reform of ordinary courts in early 2010s, at least 10 years of experience practicing law with license of attorney at law is required for Judges. The goal of reform was changing the structure of ordinary courts to resemble courts in a common law system such as the United States. Reforms included abolishing advancement and promotion opportunities for Judges to become the heads of each High Court and District Court. As of 2022, the heads of each High Court and District Court (which are referred to as the Chief Judges of each court) are mainly elected among and by Judges in each court, as well as appointed by the Chief Justice in Supreme Court. Prior to reform, all Judges were appointed just after finishing a two-year training program in the JRTI.

Judges in South Korea are protected from external political pressure under Article 106(1) of the Constitution. No judge can be removed from office unless imprisoned as criminal punishment. However, Judges can be refused from renewing their terms and can also be transferred to different courts against their will.

==== Judicial Assistant Officials ====
Judicial Assistant Officials (JAO, 사법보좌관) are Judge-equivalent officers who have limited power to rule over several procedural matters under the supervision of Judges. The JAO system is mainly influenced by a German judicial system called Rechtspfleger.

Following Article 54 of the Court Organization Act, JAOs are appointed among court officials with five to 10 years of experience on procedural matters in court. Unless a party raises objection on the ruling of JAOs, their rulings have the equivalent power that of a Judge. When the ruling of a JAO is challenged with objection, however, the supervising Judge must make a decision whether or not to accept such objection.

==== Law Clerks ====
From year 2011, fresh graduates from law school are selected as law clerks (재판연구원) to assist Judges in High Courts and District Courts for two to three years under Article 53-2 of the Court Organization Act. Law clerks in South Korea are recruited by each of the six High courts, though some of top-tier graduates are appointed as Judicial Researchers at the Supreme Court—a law clerk for Supreme Court Justices. It is noteworthy that law clerks in South Korea are not recruited by individual Judges and Supreme Court Justices.

== Military courts ==
Under Article 110(1) of the Constitution and Military Court Act, the Military Courts (군사법원) are established permanently in both peacetime and wartime as a special court (특별법원) or extraordinary court in each of South Korea's Armed Forces. As Military Courts are not established by the Court Organization Act, these courts are regarded as outside of the conventional judicial hierarchy made of ordinary courts.

Military Courts rule over criminal cases when the accused is a member of the Armed Forces. They are composed of Military Judges (군판사) and constituted by Judge Advocates (군법무관) appointed by Generals in the South Korean Armed Forces. Judge Advocates are military officers qualified as attorneys at law in South Korea yet not Judges in ordinary courts. However, final appellate jurisdiction of criminal cases in the Military Courts still falls under the jurisdiction of the Supreme Court of Korea according to Article 110(2) of the Constitution.

The permanence of the Military Courts, even in peacetime, has created various problems, as South Korea runs a mandatory conscription system. According to some, the permanent Military Court in peacetime was pointed out as a reason for continued suffer of victims due to the system's inclination to protect high-ranking military officers. Such criticism led to bold reform of military court system in 2021 which abolished the High Military Court (고등군사법원) in peacetime and transferred every appellate jurisdiction of military crime cases to the Seoul High Court.

== Constitutional Court ==
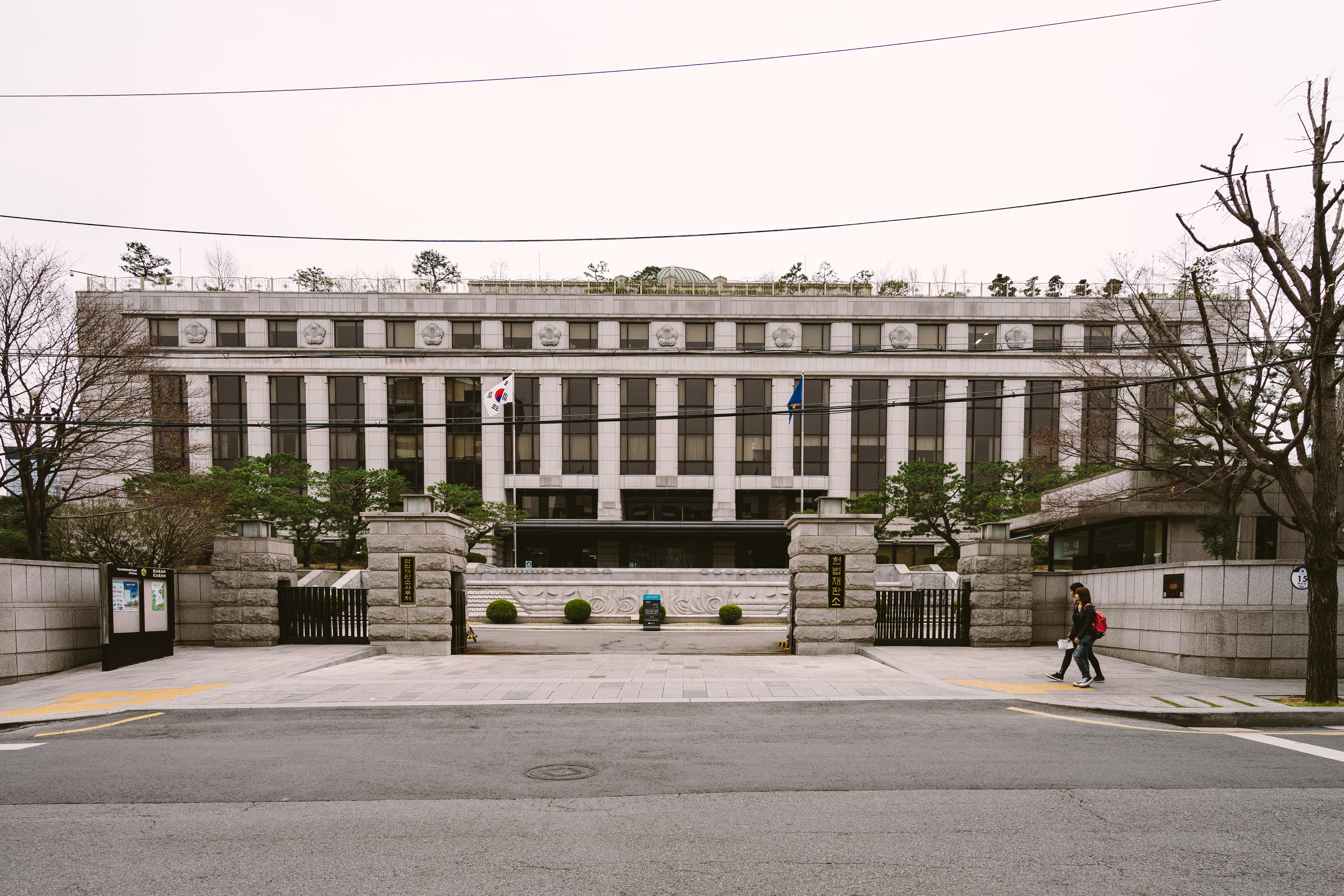
South Korean Constitutional Court building in Jongno, Seoul

The Constitutional Court (헌법재판소), seated in Jongno-gu, Seoul, and independent from the Supreme Court, is the only and highest court on matters of adjudication on constitutionality including judicial review, constitutional review on competence dispute, constitutional complaint, plus deciding cases of impeachment and cases of dissolution of unconstitutional political parties. Detailed organization and procedure of the Constitutional Court is defined under Constitutional Court Act.

This system was newly established in the Sixth Republic to reinforce protection on fundamental rights and democracy against potential rise of authoritarianism. The Constitutional Court consists of nine Justices; of these Justices, three are recommended by the Chief Justice of the Supreme Court, three by the National Assembly, and three by the President of South Korea. However, all must be appointed by the President of South Korea. The President of the Constitutional Court, which is the Chief Justice of the Constitutional Court, is appointed among Constitutional Court Justices by the President of South Korea with consent of the National Assembly. The Justices of the Constitutional Court, including the President of Constitutional Court, serve for six-year terms and cannot be older than age 70. Justices except the President of Constitutional Court can renew terms, though most Justices have never tried to renew their term out of concern for the independence of the judiciary.

=== Rapporteur Judges ===
Under Article 19 of the Constitutional Court Act, Rapporteur Judges (헌법연구관) are appointed by the President of the Constitutional Court. They serve as judicial assistants for Justices in the Constitutional Court. Rapporteur Judges serve for 10-year renewable terms up to age of 60 and are paid the same as Judges in ordinary courts. Rapporteur Judges serve longer than Justices in the Constitutional Court, while Research Judges serve shorter terms than Justices in the Supreme Court; this is designed to ensure continuity of constitutional adjudication in South Korea. As well, some Rapporteur Judge offices are filled by seconded Judges from ordinary courts and seconded government officials including prosecutors. These seconded Judges and prosecutors serve for one to two years as Rapporteur Judges.

=== Department of Court Administration ===
Under Article 17 of the Constitutional Court Act, the Department of Court Administration (DCA, 헌법재판소사무처) is established in the Constitutional Court. The head of the department is the Secretary General and is appointed by the President of the Constitutional Court. Like the NCA's role in the Supreme Court, the DCA deals with matters on court administration regarding the Constitutional Court including fiscal, personnel, and human resource affairs. Yet, while the head of NCA is appointed among the Justices in the Supreme Court, the Secretary General is not appointed among the Justices in the Constitutional Court.

== Separation of powers inside Judicial branch ==
The current Constitution of South Korea distributes power of judicial review inside the judiciary between ordinary courts in Chapter 5 and the Constitutional Court in Chapter 6. Under Article 107(2) in Chapter 5, the ordinary courts, including the Supreme Court, have ultimate jurisdiction over reviewing constitutionality of sub-statutory decrees, regulations, or actions made at the administrative level. Under Article 111(1) in Chapter 6, the Constitutional Court has ultimate jurisdiction over reviewing constitutionality of sub-constitutional statutes made at the legislature level, even without request from the ordinary courts, through Article 68(2) of the Constitutional Court Act. In this structure of power separation, the ordinary courts and the Constitutional Court can contend over each other's rulings. Yet, the Constitution does not clarify who should arbitrate when these courts struggle against each other.

One of the major power struggles between the two highest courts is constitutional complaint over judgment of ordinary courts (재판소원, German: Urteilsverfassungsbeschwerde). As in Austria, a constitutional complaint on an ordinary court's judgment is strictly forbidden according to Article 68(1) of the Constitutional Court Act. However, the Constitutional Court adjudicates that such article of the Act lacks constitutionality. A constitutional complaint over judgment of ordinary court should be exceptionally allowed when the judgment applied an unconstitutional statute, but such an application is already officially nullified before judgment by judicial review of the Constitutional Court. This kind of judicial review ruling in the Constitutional Court of Korea is called conditionally unconstitutional (한정위헌), which is actually a declaration that a statute under judicial review is currently constitutional, yet the statute must be interpreted in a specific way which is aligned to the constitutional order interpreted by the Constitutional Court. Thus, all ordinary courts, including the Supreme Court of Korea, are bound by such interpretation on statute of the Constitutional Court.

Such a concept is the attempt of the Constitutional Court to adopt the unrivaled status of the German Constitutional Court which can suggest binding interpretation on statutes to the highest ordinary courts of Germany; such a suggestion is known as a constitutional interpretation of statute (German: verfassungskonforme Auslegung). The German Constitutional Court can also adjudicate constitutional complaint over judgment of ordinary court, functioning as actual cassation; such a power has led the court to the top of constitutional system.

The Supreme Court has opposed the Constitutional Court on both the binding power of the conditionally unconstitutional ruling and the possibility of constitutional complaints over judgment of ordinary court, as they could make the Supreme Court take on a substantially inferior status similar to the system in Germany. However, whether the Constitutional Court can exercise the power of binding interpretation not only on the Constitution but also on statutes (by conditional ruling) or can review the unconstitutionality of ordinary court judgments (by constitutional complaint procedure) still remains unsolved, since the Constitution and even associated statutes have never clarified how this struggle should be settled.

== Criticism and corruption ==
=== Judges' subjective judgment on detention ===
In 2017, there also significant criticism regarding the criteria for issuing detention warrants.

According to Article 70 of South Korea's Criminal Procedure Act, detention is possible when there are the following reasons:

1. When the defendant has no fixed residence
2. When there is concern that the defendant will destroy evidence
3. When the defendant has fled or is likely to flee

However, it became a problem as criticism continued to be raised that the interpretation of 2. and 3. in South Korean courts was arbitrary. In the case of Chung Yoo-ra, despite the fact that professors who had given her special treatment were arrested due to the Ewha Womans University corruption scandal and she herself was arrested while on the run, the arrest warrant was rejected twice. This was despite the fact that there were circumstances in which she had attempted to hide her assets while on the run overseas.

Regarding Choo Seonheui, who was the secretary general of the "Korea Parent Federation" at the time, the court rejected the request for an arrest warrant, even though she herself admitted to some extent that the Korea Parent Federation had received money for the protest and that she had disappeared in the middle of the protest and had lost her cell phone.

Also, on 7 September 2022, a man in his 40s attempted to abduct a middle school girl living in the same apartment complex while brandishing a weapon in the elevator. However, he fled the scene when another resident witnessed the incident. He was later urgently arrested. Despite the victim's family expressing deep fear and saying they might have to move out because of the trauma, the South Korean court dismissed the detention warrant, stating there was no risk of flight or reoffending. This decision sparked widespread public outrage. So, regarding this dismissal decision, the police at the time also responded that they had not expected the detention warrant request to be dismissed at the time of arrest, and the Korean Women Lawyers Association also issued a statement of condemn.

A few days later, on 14 September 2022, a murder occurred at Sindang station. The incident involved a stalking perpetrator who had been indicted for stalking, taking creepshots, and making threats against the victim over a span of three years. Despite the severity of these crimes, the court dismissed the arrest warrant on the grounds that there was no risk of evidence tampering or flight. As a result, the victim was murdered in a retaliatory attack by the perpetrator just one day before the sentencing. Public outrage followed, with many believing that the victim could have been saved if the judge had approved the detention. There were also widespread calls for the judge to be disciplined for the poor judgment that led to the victim's death.

==== Occurrence of retaliatory crimes due to excessive rejection of detention warrant applications ====
South Korean courts are being criticised for their tendency to reject detention warrants.

In June 2024, there was a case where the court ruled not to detain a person who committed the serious crime of rape. The judiciary is being criticised for neglecting its duties rather than protecting crime victims, and for being extremely backward in law enforcement.

Also, there is a murder incident occurred on 10 June 2025. The police requested a detention warrant for a man who had persistently stalked the victim and threatened her with a weapon, citing a high risk of repeat offenses. However, the court rejected the request. Ultimately, the suspect murdered the victim.

=== Controversy over political rulings ===
South Korea's courts have sometimes faced criticism for making politically motivated rulings. A representative example is the Supreme Court of Korea's appellate ruling that overturned the lower court's acquittal and remanded the case for retrial with a guilty interpretation regarding Lee Jae-myung, the candidate of the Democratic Party of Korea in the 21st presidential election, for violating the Public Official Election Act.

Controversy arose around this ruling because, just one hour after the sentencing began, Acting President Han Duk-soo resigned in order to run in the 21st presidential election. This led to sharp criticism from the opposition, who claimed it was a "political ruling", and questioned whether it constituted "political interference" or "election interference", even calling it a "blatant judicial coup".

Kim Dong-yeon, the Governor of Gyeonggi Province expressed suspicion that the Supreme Court of Korea had interfered in the election, and criticised the Court by stating that the people stand above the judiciary.

=== Presumption of guilt in sexual crime cases ===
South Korean courts are being criticised for presumption of guilt, especially in sexual crimes.

=== Abuse of reduced sentences or leniency ===
There is a strange practice in which offenders receive reduced sentences simply by donating the deposited compensation money, even when the victim refuses to settle and demands punishment. This has led to criticism that the courts are effectively being bribed.

In South Korea, if a defendant writes a letter of reflection, the court often reduces the sentence. This practice is virtually nonexistent in other civil law countries. The rationale is that such letters demonstrate the defendant's acknowledgment of wrongdoing, remorse, sincerity, a pledge to prevent recurrence, and a sense of responsibility toward the victim. However, this reasoning has been widely criticised as unconvincing. In one notorious case, a man weighing 72 kg and standing 180 cm tall beat his girlfriend on the head for an hour and strangled her to death, yet received a reduced sentence simply for submitting a letter of reflection. In fact, in this particular case, suspicions arose that the letters had been ghostwritten, as each one appeared to be in a different handwriting.

Moreover, about half of the sexual offenses against children result in suspended prison sentences, primarily because the victims' parents request leniency regardless of their child's will.

==== Lenient sentences for child abusers ====
In South Korea, there is a provision of the South Korean Criminal Act imposing increased punishment for the crime of murdering a direct ascendant, but there is no South Korean legal provision imposing increased punishment for the crime of murdering a direct descendant. This shows that South Korean law does not protect the lives of children. Also, this is well reflected in the decisions made by judges in South Korea. There are numerous cases of child abuse in South Korea. There are many cases that have been criticised and controversial because South Korean judges were made only from the perspective of the parents, the perpetrators, rather than the children, the victims.

A representative example is the child abuse case that occurred in Ulsan in 2008. In this case, the perpetrator, a stepmother, beat her 5-year-old stepson to death, put him in a drum, set him on fire, and then falsely reported him missing. Even if we only consider the brutality of the crime, it is evaluated to be on a level comparable to the Murder of Junko Furuta. However, the sentence handed down by the South Korean judge in the first trial was only 15 years in prison.

In the child abuse case that occurred in Daegu in 2013, much lighter sentences were handed down. The biological mother was sentenced to just 4 years in prison, the man she lived with was sentenced to 10 months in prison, and the medical person involved in the incident was sentenced to 18 months in prison with a 2-year suspension, and the driver of the hearse was sentenced to 8 months in prison, suspended for two years.

The bigger problem is that there are many such cases. In the case of a case in which a baby was beaten to death in Hongseong County in 2016, the prosecution demanded a 15-year sentence, but the judge only sentenced the perpetrator to the minimum sentence of 5 years, and showed the attitude of writing a contradictory and difficult-to-understand sentence in the verdict, saying that the mother, the perpetrator, "needs the warmth and protection of a mother".

=== Low reliability ===
According to OECD study in 2013 and 2015, though South Korean ordinary courts achieved top-tier status among OECD countries, the confidence of South Koreans on their judicial system is dropping rapidly from the 2010s. Specifically, the confidence level on the judicial branch is lower than that of the executive branches of the South Korean government.

Even after 2020, South Korean citizens' distrust of the judicial system continues, and South Korea still ranks at the bottom among OECD countries. According to a survey conducted in 2021, only 49.1% of South Koreans responded that they trust the courts and judicial system, which is 7.8%p lower than the OECD average of 56.9%.

=== etc. ===
- Some suggest that Judges in the lower ordinary courts of South Korea are exposed to the authoritative influences of the Chief Justice and the President of South Korea. For example, all lower ordinary court Judges are usually transferred to different courts all around South Korea after about two years by the order of Chief Justice per Article 44 of the Court Organization Act. This strong influence of the Chief Justice on Judges later provoked pressure to reform courts.

=== Causes of issues and criticism ===
==== Absence of checks and balances on judges ====
There is an opinion that the absence of a check-and-balance mechanism on judges has led to public distrust and controversies involving judges. Some argue that if impeachments against judges had been actively carried out — as in the United States, the United Kingdom, and Japan — such situations would not have occurred. Notably, Lee Tan-hi, then a member of the National Assembly from the Democratic Party of Korea, stated in 2021 that the impeachment of judges is not an infringement of judicial independence and that in the UK, 20 to 30 judges are impeached each year.

For example, Japan has an impeachment system in which the Japanese Diet thoroughly responds to ethical issues of judges and legal violations. For example, there have been cases where incumbent judges have been impeached for serious issues such as stalking female court staff or prostitution of minors. This shows the effective aspect of the system for removing bad judges from the Japanese judicial system. This means that the system requires a high sense of responsibility for judges' duties, and that it has a system in place to more smoothly pursue accountability of judges.

==== Absence of democratic control over the judiciary ====
The absence of democratic control through the jury or lay judge systems also contributes to the controversy surrounding judges.

The jury system is implemented in common law countries such as the United States and the United Kingdom. Also, many European countries and Japan use a lay judge system in which jurors not only determine guilt or innocence, but also consult with the judge to decide the sentence.

Of course, in South Korea, there is a system called Citizen Participation Trial (국민참여재판) that appropriately combines the jury system and the lay judge system. However, due to the existence of Article 27, Paragraph 1 of the Constitution of the Republic of Korea, which states, "All citizens have the right to be tried according to law by judges established by the Constitution and the law", unlike the United States, the United Kingdom, Japan, and many European countries, it can only be implemented when the defendant so desires. There is an opinion that this part should be resolved through constitutional amendment. Even legal experts are not a few who are suggesting the introduction of a jury system or a lay judge system.

== See also ==
- Constitution of South Korea
- Politics of South Korea
- Government of South Korea
- National Assembly (South Korea)
- Supreme Court of Korea
- Constitutional Court of Korea
- Law of South Korea
