= Kim Yi-su =

South Korean justice (born 1953)

- 김이수
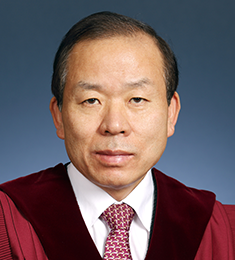

Justice of the Constitutional Court of Korea
- In office 20 September 2012 – September 2018
- Nominated by: National Assembly (Democratic Party)
- Appointed by: Lee Myung-bak

Personal details
- Born: 24 March 1953 (age 73) Gochang-gun, Jeollabuk-do, South Korea
- Education: Seoul National University (LL.B.)

Kim Yi-su (Korean: 김이수; born 24 March 1953) is a former Justice of the Constitutional Court of Korea.

== Career ==
1982 Judge, Daejeon District Court

1984 Judge, Hongseong Branch of Daejeon District court

1986 Judge, Daejeon District Court

1987 Judge, Suwon District Court

1989 Judge, Seoul High Court

1991 Research Judge, Supreme Court

1993 Senior Judge, Seoul Civil District Court

1993 Chief Judge, Jeongju Branch of Jeonju District Court

1996 Professor of Judicial Research and Training Institute

1999 Senior Judge, Seoul District Court

2000 Senior Judge, Patent Court

2002 Senior Judge, Seoul High Court

2006 Chief Judge, Cheongju District Court

2008 Chief Judge, Incheon District Court

2009 Chief Judge, Seoul Southern District Court

2010 Chief Judge, Patent Court

2011 President of Judicial Research and Training Institute

2012 Justice, Constitutional Court (until September 2018)
