= Seoul National University School of Law =

Law school of Seoul National University

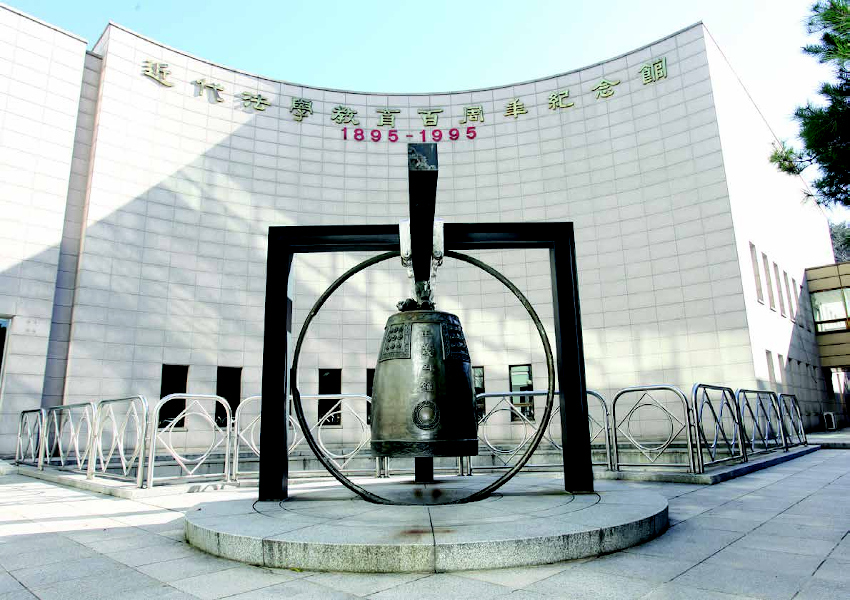
- The Bell of Justice in front of the Centennial Building of School of Law
- Parent school: Seoul National University
- Established: 1895; 131 years ago
- School type: National law school
- Dean: Kim Jong-bo
- Location: Gwanak, Seoul, South Korea; 37°27′45″N 126°57′06″E
- Enrollment: 1194
- Faculty: 60
- Website: law.snu.ac.kr

- Seoul National University School of Law
- Hangul: 서울대학교 법학전문대학원
- Hanja: 서울大學校法學専門大學院
- RR: Seoul daehakgyo beophak jeonmun daehagwon
- MR: Sŏul taehakkyo pŏphak chŏnmun taehagwŏn

Seoul National University School of Law (Korean: 서울대학교 법학전문대학원; SNU Law) is the law school of Seoul National University, a national research university in Gwanak, Seoul, South Korea.

Following legacy of the only and the first modern national law school established in 1895 as 'Popkwan Yangsungso' (Korean: 법관양성소) for training judges, the SNU Law started its official history at 1946 in name of SNU College of Law, as one of college constituting the Seoul National University, offering continental styled legal education such as LL.B. courses for undergraduates.

After nationwide legal education reform of South Korea in 2009, it adopted the American model of 3-year law school system, and changed its official name to SNU School of Law. It currently offers the J.D., J.S.D., LL.M., and Ph.D. degrees in law, and no longer admits undergraduate law students. Currently, admission to the J.D. program is limited to 150 students per year as numerus clausus, under national government's policy to keep number of enrollments in sustainable level.

== History ==
The law school was established in its first iteration in 1895 during the Joseon Dynasty as the Judicial Officials Training Institute. Following the Gabo Reform, intended to be a sweeping reform of the Korean government, then-minister of justice Suh Kwangbom proposed creating and institution to educate judicial law. Initially, the institute served men between the ages of 25 and 30, and granted a bachelor of law.

In 1909, the institute was restructured, becoming a law school and a limited professional school. In 1911, the name and setup was again changed, and the school became Seoul Professional School. However, in 1922 it returned to being exclusively a law school, and the name was once again changed to Seoul Professional Law School.

In the early 1940s, the law school was forced to cease admitting new students due to harsh wartime policies enacted by the Japanese; however, these policies were reverted following the end of the war, and enrollment returned to normal levels.

Following the April Revolution, a student-led revolution which would lead to the end of the autocratic regime of Syngman Ree, enrollment was sharply and suddenly reduced by the government from three hundred students to one hundred and sixty, based on its assumption that the law school was the center of the protests. Enrollment stayed at this level until recovering in 1981.

== Library ==
Established in August 1946, the Seoul National University Law Library opened on June 30, 2014. It currently holds more than 155,055 volumes in its collection.

== Notable people ==
=== Alumni ===
Notable alumni include 13th President of South Korea Yoon Suk-yeol, and most of Justices and Chief Justices of the Supreme Court of Korea, such as 16th Chief Justice Kim Myeong-soo. Also, most of Justices and Presidents of the Constitutional Court of Korea are composed of SNU Law alumni, including 7th President of the Constitutional Court Yoo Nam-seok.

The first transgender lawyer in South Korea, Park Han-hee, is an alumni.

== Criticism ==
The SNU Law School has been criticized due to the lack of admitted students older than 30 years of age. The Law School was also criticized for having admitted 88.0% (810) of its students from the top three colleges of South Korea.

Starting in 2027, the school will begin considering repeat applicants’ prior law school enrollment history, reversing the Korean Law School Council’s “repeat applicant blind” policy introduced just a year earlier. The change comes amid a growing number of repeat applicants, increasingly intense GPA competition, and concerns over a worsening academic environment.
