= Lee Eun-ae =

South Korean judge (born 1966)

- 이은애
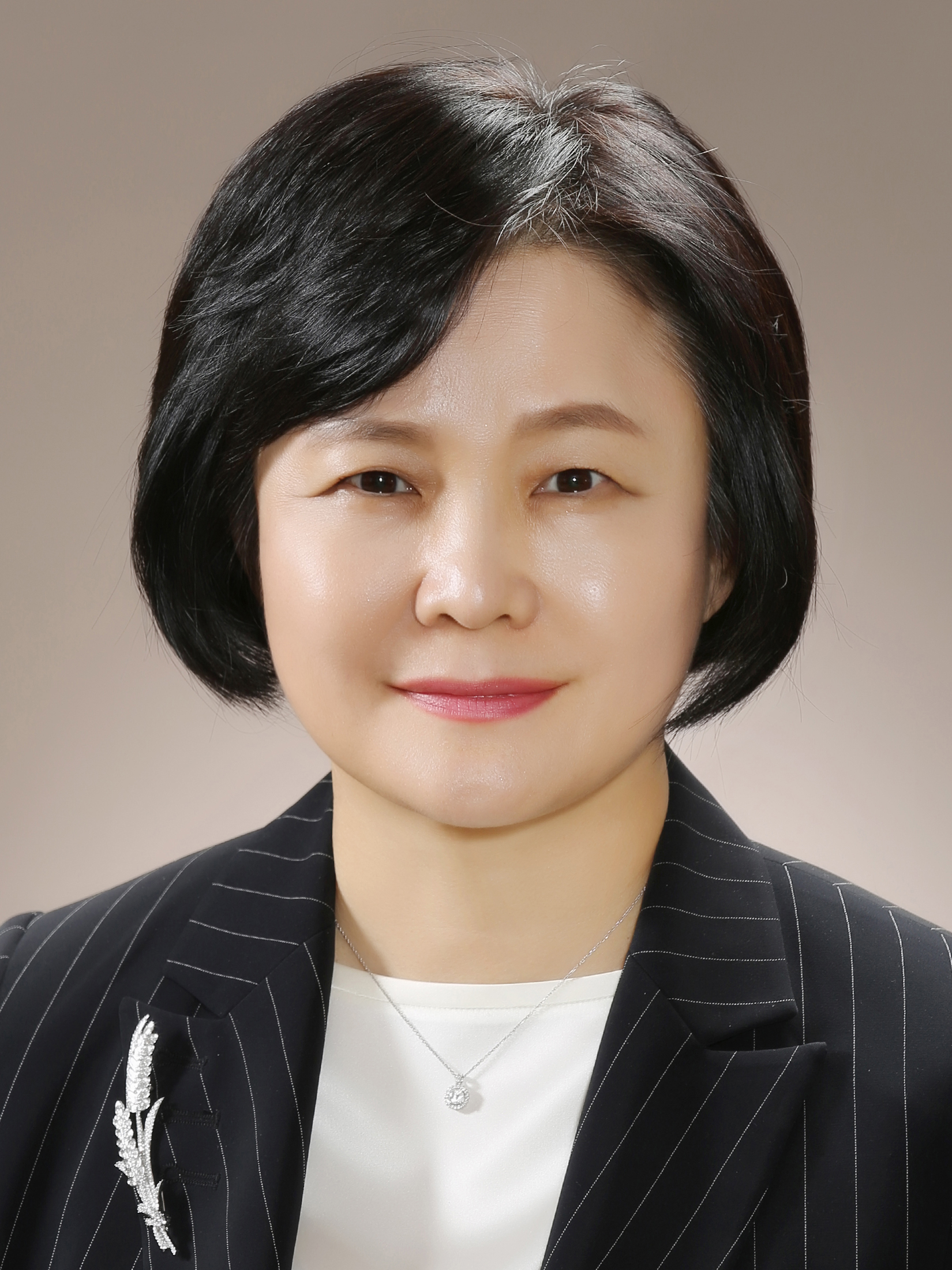

President of the Constitutional Court of Korea
- Acting; 11 November 2023 – 30 November 2023
- Preceded by: Yoo Nam-seok
- Succeeded by: Lee Jong-seok

Justice of the Constitutional Court of Korea
- In office 21 September 2018 – 20 September 2024
- Nominated by: Kim Myeong-su
- Appointed by: Moon Jae-in

Personal details
- Born: 21 May 1966 (age 60)
- Education: Seoul National University (LL.B., MLaws)

Lee Eun-ae (Korean: 이은애; Hanja: 李垠厓, born 21 May 1966) is a South Korean lawyer who served as justice of the Constitutional Court of Korea from 2018 to 2024.

== Early life and career ==
Born 1966 in Naju, Lee was educated at Salesio Girls' High School in Gwangju and studied law at Seoul National University. She passed national entrance test for the Judicial Research and Training Institute in 1987, and started legal career as judge at the Seoul Western District Court in 1990. During her career as ordinary court judge, she was once seconded to the Constitutional Court of Korea as rapporteur judge for 2 years.

== Constitutional Court career ==
In 2018, with nomination by Supreme Court chief justice Kim Myeong-su, Lee was appointed by national president Moon Jae-in to succeed seat of justice Lee Jin-sung. Around the time of her appointment, she was expected to constitute liberal bloc inside the court. However, she was later considered as swing vote. For example, in a case where the constitutionality of punishing abortion was at issue, she sided with the progressives by ruling that such punishment was unconstitutional, but in a case where the constitutionality of a law restricting the prosecutor's power of direct investigation was at issue, she sided with the conservatives by ruling that completely eliminating the authority of prosecutors to investigate directly was unconstitutional.

On November 10, 2023, due to the resignation of Constitutional Court President Yoo Nam-seok, Justice Lee Jongseok, who had been appointed to succeed him, was delayed in the appointment process, resulting in a vacancy. Due to the vacancy of the post of President of the Constitutional Court, Senior Justice Lee Eunae held the post of Acting President of the Constitutional Court from 11 November 2023 until the appointment of Judge Lee Jongseok on 30 November 2023.

== Timeline ==
Below list is timeline of her brief biography.

- 1987 29th National Bar Exam
- 1990 Judge, Western Branch of Seoul District Court
- 1992 Judge, Seoul Civil District Court
- 1994 Judge, Gwangju District Court
- 1999 Judge, Southern Branch of Seoul District Court
- 1999 UC Berkeley (overseas training)
- 2000 Judge, Northern Branch of Seoul District Court
- 2002 Rapporteur Judge, Constitutional Court of Korea
- 2005 Senior Judge, Incheon District Court
- 2008 Senior Judge, Eastern Branch of Seoul District Court
- 2010 Senior Judge, Seoul Central District Court
- 2012 Senior Judge, Jeonju Branch of Gwangju High Court
- 2014 Senior Judge, Seoul High Court
- 2017 (Acting) Chief Senior Judge, Seoul Family Court
- Sept 2018 to Oct 2024 Justice, Constitutional Court

== Notes ==
Legal offices
Preceded by Lee Jin-sung	Justice of the Constitutional Court of Korea; 2018–2024	Succeeded by Kim Bok-hyeong
Preceded by Yoo Nam-seok	President of the Constitutional Court of Korea; Acting; 2023	Succeeded by Lee Jong-seok
