= Lee Seon-ae =

S.Korean Constitutional Court Justice from 2017

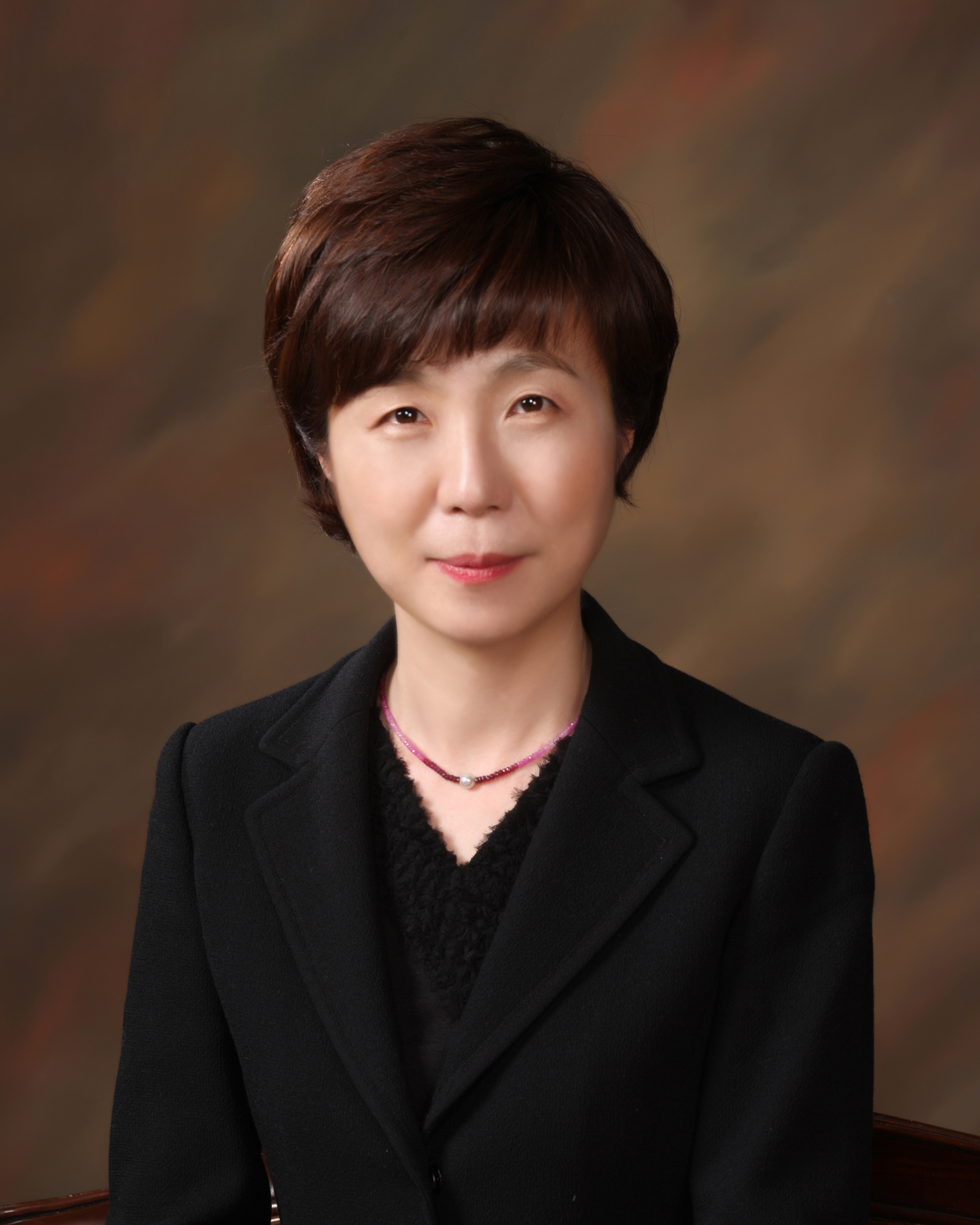

Justice of the Constitutional Court of Korea
- In office 29 March 2017 – 28 March 2023
- Nominated by: Yang Sung-tae
- Appointed by: Hwang Kyo-ahn
- Preceded by: Lee Jung-mi

Personal details
- Born: 3 January 1967 (age 59)
- Education: Seoul National University (LL.B.)

Korean name
- Hangul: 이선애
- Hanja: 李宣厓
- RR: I Seonae
- MR: I Sŏnae

Lee Seon-ae is a South Korean women jurist, who serves as Justice of the Constitutional Court of Korea since 2017. She was nominated by Supreme Court chief Yang Sung-tae and appointed by acting President Hwang Kyo-ahn. She is regarded as moderate group among nine Justices of the Constitutional Court.

== Career ==
1985, Department of Judicial Sciences, Faculty of Graduated from Songyue Girls' High School Law, Seoul National University,1989, Passed the 31st Judicial Examination, In the Constitutional Court, where she worked for two years and since 2006, she has worked as a lawyer, At Huawu Law Firm since 2014, she has also served as a non-permanent member of the National Committee for human rights. She was nominated by President of the Constitutional Court, Yang Song-tae, in 2017, To succeed Judge Lee Jung-mi, confirmed by the Acting President, Hwang Kyo-ahn retired from her position as a judge on March 28, 2023.

- 1992: Judge, Seoul Civil District Court
- 1994: Judge, Eastern Branch of Seoul District Court
- 1996: Judge, Daejeon District Court
- 1996: Judge, Seoul District Court
- 2001: Judge, Seoul Administration Court
- 2003: Judge, Seoul High Court
- 2004: Seconded as Rapporteur Judge to the Constitutional Court of Korea
- 2006: Attorney, Yoon & Yang Limited Liability Company
- 2017: Justice of the Constitutional Court of Korea (since 29 March 2017)

Legal offices
Preceded by Lee Jung-mi	Justice of the Constitutional Court of Korea; 2017–2023	Succeeded by Kim Hyungdu
