= Lee Youngjin =

Justice of the Constitutional Court of Korea

- 이영진
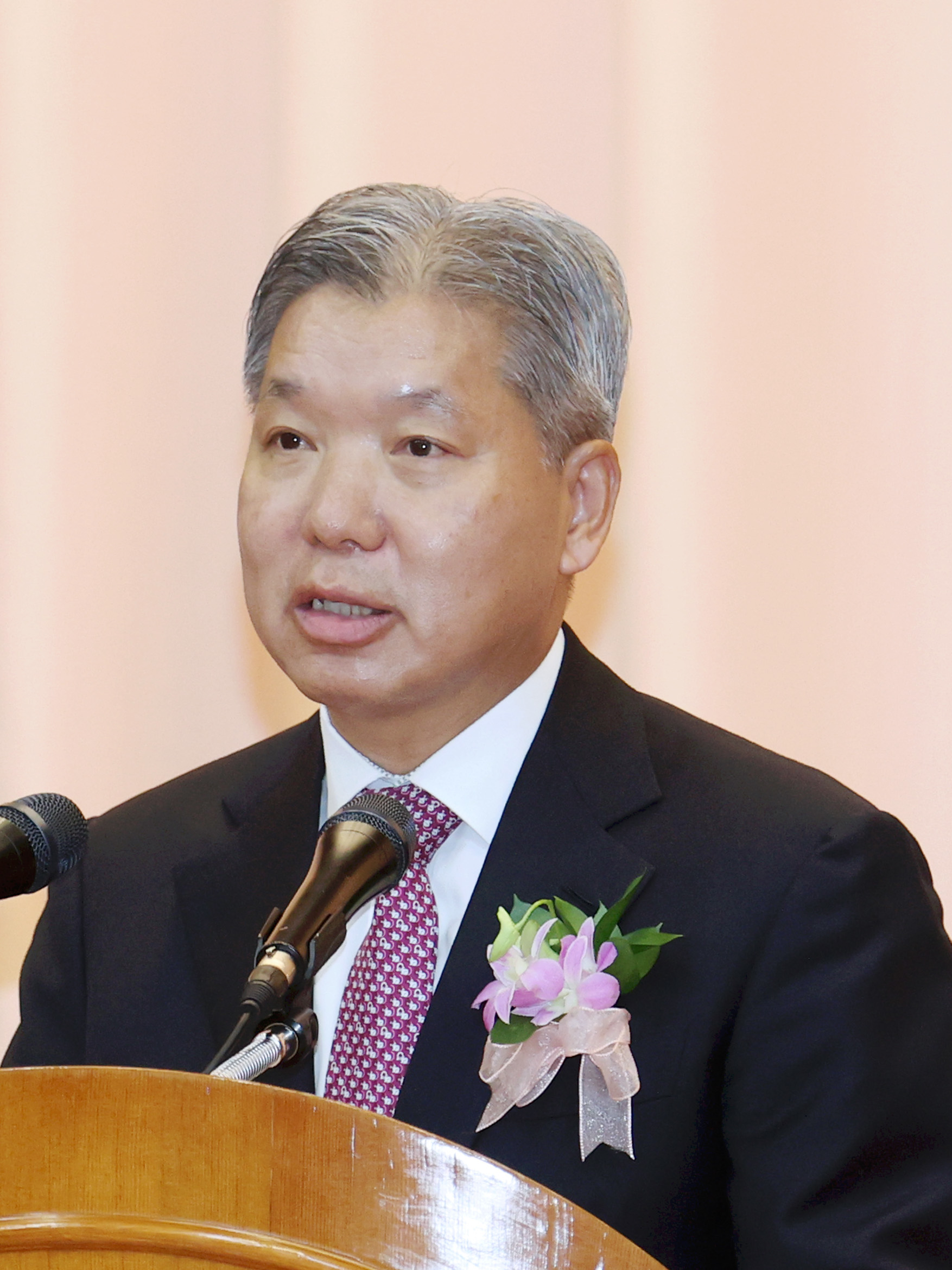
- Lee in 2024

Justice of the Constitutional Court of Korea
- In office 18 October 2018 – 17 October 2024

Personal details
- Born: 25 July 1961 (age 65)
- Education: Sungkyunkwan University

Lee Youngjin is a South Korean judge. He was appointed to Justice of the Constitutional Court of Korea in 2018.

He is from Hongseong County, South Chungcheong Province. After graduating from Sungkyunkwan University Law school, he passed the bar examination, Thirty-second with first-class honors in 1990. He began his career as a judge at the Cheongju District Court. He then served as a judicial policy officer at the National Court Administration and as a presiding judge at the Jeonju District Court and Suwon District Courts. He left the court in 2009 and served as a specialist member of the National Assembly's Legislation and Judiciary Committee for two years. After being reappointed as a judge in 2011, he served as a professor at the Judicial Research and Training Institute and as a presiding judge at the Seoul Central District court, Busan High Court, and Seoul High Court. He succeeded Justice Kang Il-won and was appointed a judge of the Constitutional court by President Moon Jae-in on October 18, 2018, upon the recommendation of the Pareunmirai Party.

== Career ==
- 1993 Judge, Cheongju District Court
- 1996 Judge, Cheongju District Court Jecheon Branch
- 1997 Judge, Suwon District Court
- 2000 Judge, Seoul District Court
- 2002 Judge, Seoul District Court Eastern Branch
- 2003 Judicial Policy Research Judge, National Court Administration
- 2004 Judge, Seoul High Court
- 2005 Judge, Judicial Policy Office, National Court Administration
- 2006 Judge, Seoul High Court
- 2008 Presiding Judge, Jeonju District Court
- 2009 Presiding Judge, Suwon District Court
- 2011 Professor, Judicial Research & Training Institute
- 2012 Presiding Judge, Seoul Central District Court
- 2015 Presiding Judge, Busan High Court Changwon Branch
- 2017 Presiding Judge, Seoul High Court
- 2018~2024 Justice of the Constitutional Court of Korea
