= AACC =

AACC may refer to:

- Abe Ani Combat Club, a mixed martial arts gym in Japan
- Aboriginal Art and Cultures Centre, scheduled for construction 2021–2024 at Lot Fourteen, Adelaide, Australia
- All Africa Conference of Churches, ecumenical fellowship in Africa
- All Arms Commando Course, course run by the Royal Marines in the UK
- American Association for Clinical Chemistry, a non-profit professional organization involved in the clinical chemistry
- American Association of Cereal Chemists, a non-profit professional organization involved in the science of cereal or grain
- American Association of Community Colleges, a non-profit organization representing the interest of community colleges
- American Automatic Control Council, a professional organization involved in research of control theory
- Anne Arundel Community College, a community college in Maryland, U.S.
- Arab American Chamber of Commerce, corporation based in Washington, D.C.
- Association of Asian Constitutional Courts and Equivalent Institutions, international organization for constitutional justice in Asia
- Australian Army Catering Corps, one of the Australian Army Corps
