= Park Jong-mun =

South Korean politician and judge (born 1959)

Park Jongmun
- 박종문
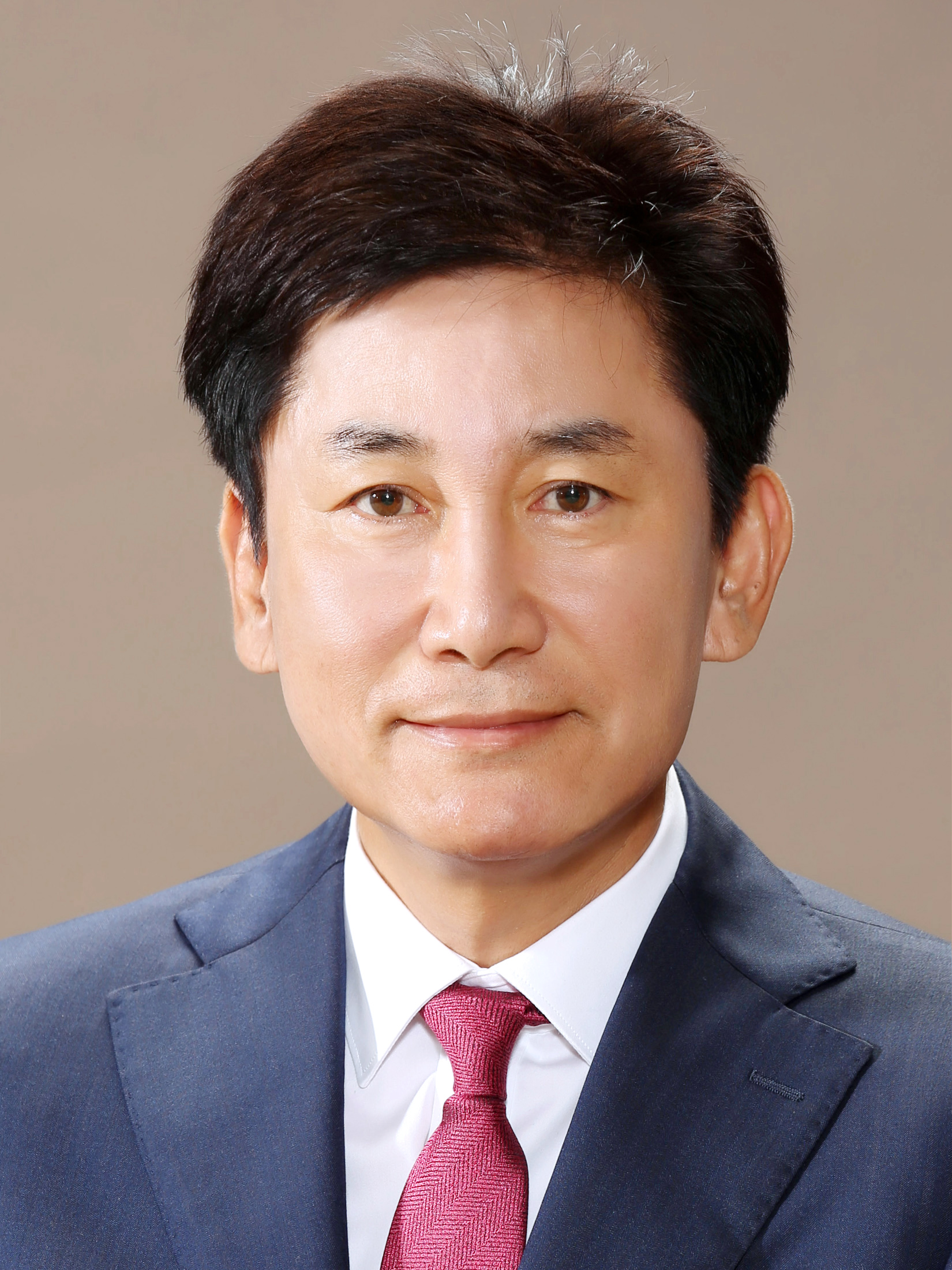

Secretary General of the Constitutional Court of Korea

Personal details
- Born: 22 October 1959 (age 67)

Park Jongmun was named the Secretary General of the Constitutional Court of Korea in 2019.

== Career ==
- 1978 Jangheung High School
- 1983 Seoul National University College of Law
- 1984 26th National Bar Exam
- 1987 Judicial Research & Training Institute
- 1990 Judge, Seoul District Court
- 1992 Judge, Seoul Civil District Court
- 1994 Judge, Gwangju District Court
- 1996 Judge, Gwangju High Court
- 1997 Judge, Seoul District Court
- 1999 Judge, Seoul High Court
- 2000 Research Judge, Supreme Court
- 2002 Presiding Judge, Jeju District Court
- 2004 Presiding Judge, Ansan Branch, Suwon District Court
- 2006 Presiding Judge, Seoul Northern District Court
- 2008 Presiding Judge, Seoul Central District Court
- 2009 Attorney, One Law Partners, LLC
- 2012 Representative Attorney, One Law Partners, LLC
- 2014 President, Hanbit Youth Center
- 2017 President, Beautiful Foundation
- 2019 Secretary General, Constitutional Court

== Awards ==
- 2016 Order of Civil Merit Mongnyeon Medal
