= Kim Heon-jeong =

South Korean judge (born 1958)

Kim Heon Jeong
- 김헌정

Secretary General of the Constitutional Court of Korea
- In office 8 November 2017 – 2019
- Preceded by: Kim Yong Heon
- Succeeded by: Park Jong Mun

Personal details
- Born: Busan, South Korea
- Education: Seoul National University (LL.B.)

Kim Heon Jeong (Korean: 김헌정; Hanja: 金憲政) became the 11th Secretary General of the Constitutional Court of Korea on November 8, 2017.
