= Yoo Nam-seok =

7th President of the Constitutional Court of Korea

- 유남석
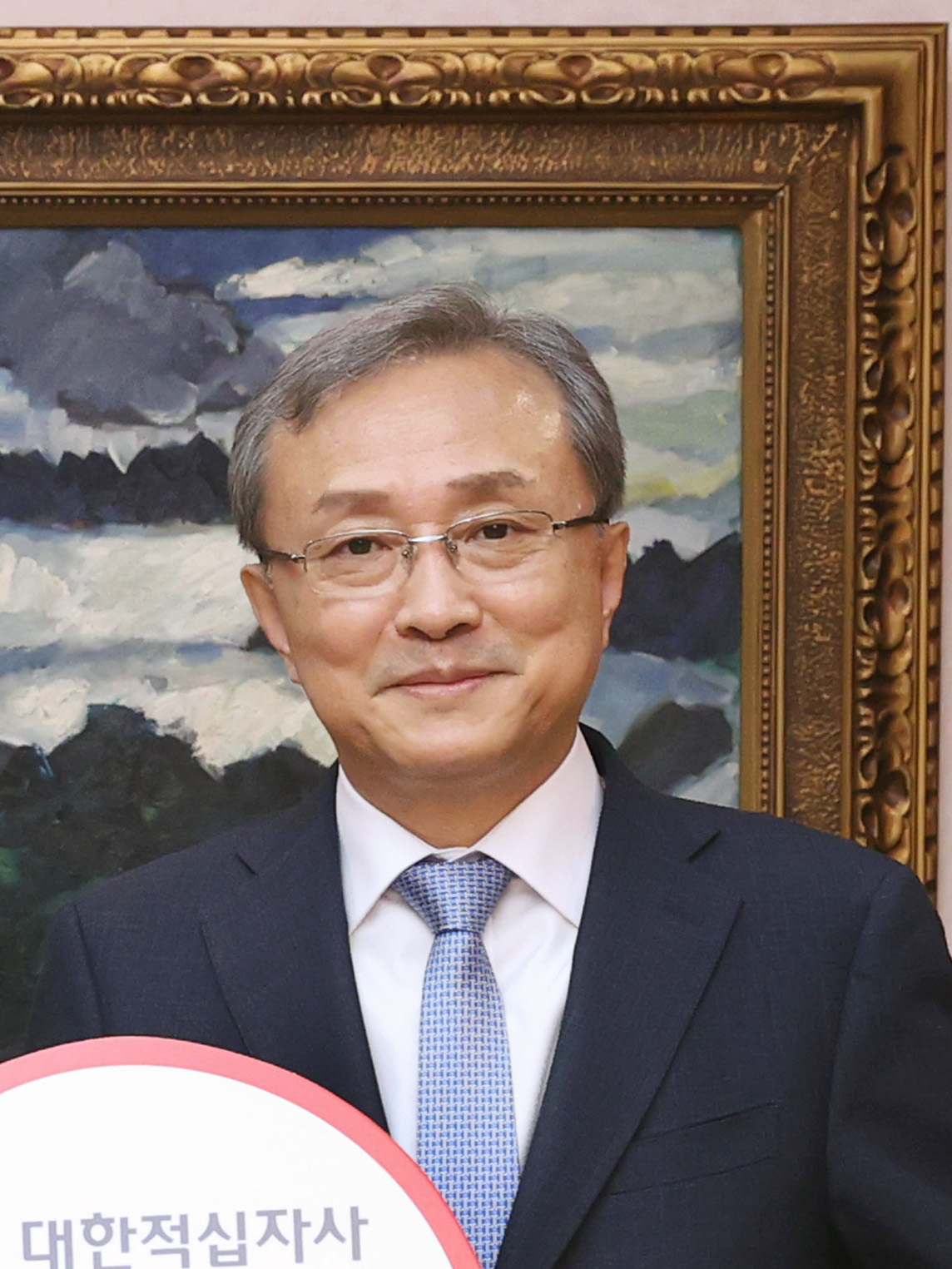
- Yoo in 2023

7th President of the Constitutional Court of Korea
- In office 21 September 2018 – 10 November 2023
- Appointed by: Moon Jae-in
- Preceded by: Lee Jin-sung
- Succeeded by: Lee Eunae (acting); Lee Jong-seok

Justice of the Constitutional Court of Korea
- In office 11 November 2017 – 10 November 2023
- Appointed by: Moon Jae-in
- Preceded by: Park Han-chul
- Succeeded by: Jeong Hyeong-sik

Personal details
- Born: 1 May 1957 (age 69) Mokpo, South Jeolla Province, South Korea
- Education: Seoul National University (LL.B.)

Yoo Nam-seok (Korean: 유남석; Hanja: 劉南碩; born 1 May 1957) was the 7th President of the Constitutional Court of Korea since 21 September 2018 to 10 November 2023. Following the vacancy of the presidency of the Constitutional Court; his position has been held since 11 November 2023 by the acting president Lee Eu-nae until the nomination of the new president in the Constitutional Court. During his tenure, he was widely perceived to be part of the court's liberal bloc, and the Constitutional Court struck down restrictions of abortion in South Korea in 2019.

== Early life and education ==
Born in Mokpo, Jeonnam Province of South Korea, Yoo Nam-seok graduated from Seoul National University college of law. He passed the 23rd National Bar Exam in 1981 and completed the Judicial Research and Training Institute in 1983 to be a judge.

== Career ==
He expressed his view that conscientious objectors should be allowed to be granted the opportunity for alternative military service instead of being punished on his paper titled ‘Legal Review on Conscientious Objectors’ during his military service as an army legal officer in 1985.

He was a presiding judge of the Seoul High Court before becoming the 35th Chief Judge of the Gwangju High Court to replace his predecessor Bang Geuk-seong in February 2016.

He was appointed as Constitutional Court Justice directly by President of South Korea Moon Jae-in on October 19, 2017, and sworn in on November 13, 2017.

The National Assembly passed a bill to appoint him as the President of the Constitutional Court on September 20, 2018, and President Moon appointed him to the presidency the next day.

== Career ==
- 1986: Judge, Seoul Civil District Court
- 1993: Seconded as Rapporteur Judge to the Constitutional Court of Korea
- 1994: Judge, Seoul High Court
- 1996: Research Judge, Supreme Court of Korea
- 2002: Senior Judge, Seoul Central District Court and Director of Judicial Policy, Supreme Court Administration
- 2003: Senior Judge, Seoul Administrative Court
- 2005: Senior Judge, Daejeon High Court
- 2008: Seconded as Rapporteur Judge to the Constitutional Court of Korea
- 2010: Senior Judge, Seoul High Court
- 2012: Chief Judge, Seoul Northern District Court
- 2016: Chief Judge, Gwangju High Court
- 2017 - 2023: Justice of the Constitutional Court of Korea
- 2018 - 2023 : President of the Constitutional Court of Korea

Legal offices
Preceded by Park Han-chul	Justice of the Constitutional Court of Korea; 2017–2023	Succeeded by Cheong Hyungsik
Preceded by Lee Jin-sung	President of the Constitutional Court of Korea; 2018–2023	Succeeded by Lee Eunae (acting); Lee Jongseok
