= Cho Hanchang =

South Korean judge (born 1965)

- 조한창
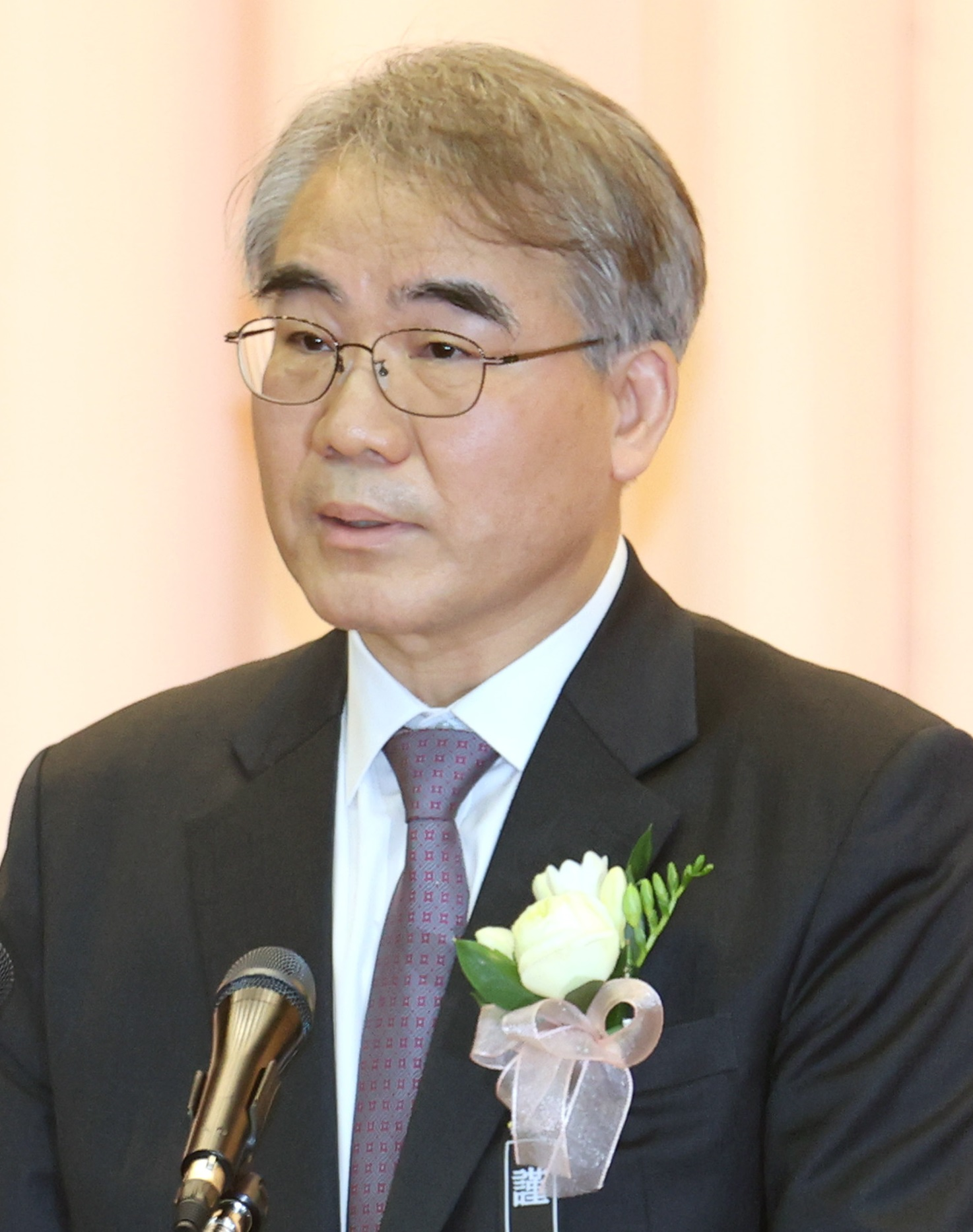

Justice of the Constitutional Court of Korea
- Incumbent
- Assumed office Janunary 1, 2025
- Nominated by: National Assembly (with recommendation from People Power Party)
- Appointed by: Choi Sang-mok

Personal details
- Born: May 14, 1965 (age 61) Suwon, South Korea
- Education: Seoul National University (LL.B.); Korea University (LL.M)

Korean name
- Hangul: 조한창
- Hanja: 趙漢暢
- RR: Jo Hanchang
- MR: Cho Hanch'ang

Cho Hanchang (Korean: 조한창; born May 14, 1965) is a South Korean jurist who serves as a justice of the Constitutional Court of Korea. He was nominated by the National Assembly on December 26, 2024, upon the recommendation of the People Power Party and officially appointed to the court by acting national president Choi Sang-mok on January 1, 2025.

== Early life and education ==
Cho was born on May 14, 1965, in Suwon. After he graduated from Sangmoon High School, he attended Seoul National University School of Law where he graduated in 1987. He passed the 28th bar examination in 1986. In 2004, he obtained a master's degree in intellectual property law from Korea University.

== Early legal career ==
Cho's legal career began when Cho was appointed as a judge for the Eastern Branch of the Busan District Court in 1992. In 1994, he joined the Busan District Court before heading to Seoul in 1996 where he served as a judge for the Uijeongbu Branch of the Seoul District Court. In 1998, he was transferred to the Suwon District Court before rejoining the Seoul District Court in 1999. In 2001, he became a judge for the Seoul High Court and served as a research judge for the Supreme Court in 2002. From 2004 to 2005, he was promoted to the position of chief judge for the Jeju District Court.

In 2006, he became a professor for the Judicial Research and Training Institute. In 2008, he joined the Seoul Central District Court as a chief judge and then transferred to the Pyeongtaek Branch of the Suwon District Court in 2011. In 2012, he served as a chief judge for the Busan High Court and then rejoined the Seoul High Court as chief judge in 2013. He also served as acting chief judge for the Seoul Administrative Court in 2015. In 2021, Cho left the court and started his own law firm.

== Constitutional Court of South Korea (2024–present) ==
On December 6, 2024, the People Power Party named Cho as the ruling party's choice for one of the three Constitutional Court seats filled by the National Assembly. The National Assembly held a hearing on Cho's nomination on December 24 that was boycotted by the People Power Party. On December 26, the National Assembly voted to approve all three nominations to the Constitutional Court including Cho, Chung Kyesun, and Ma Eun-hyeok. On December 31, 2024, acting president Choi Sang-mok decided to appoint Cho. His tenure officially began on January 1, 2025.

== See also ==
- List of justices of the Constitutional Court of Korea

Legal offices
Preceded by Lee Jong-seok	Justice of the Constitutional Court of Korea; 2025–present	Incumbent
