= Kim Bok-hyeong =

South Korean judge (born 1968)

- 김복형
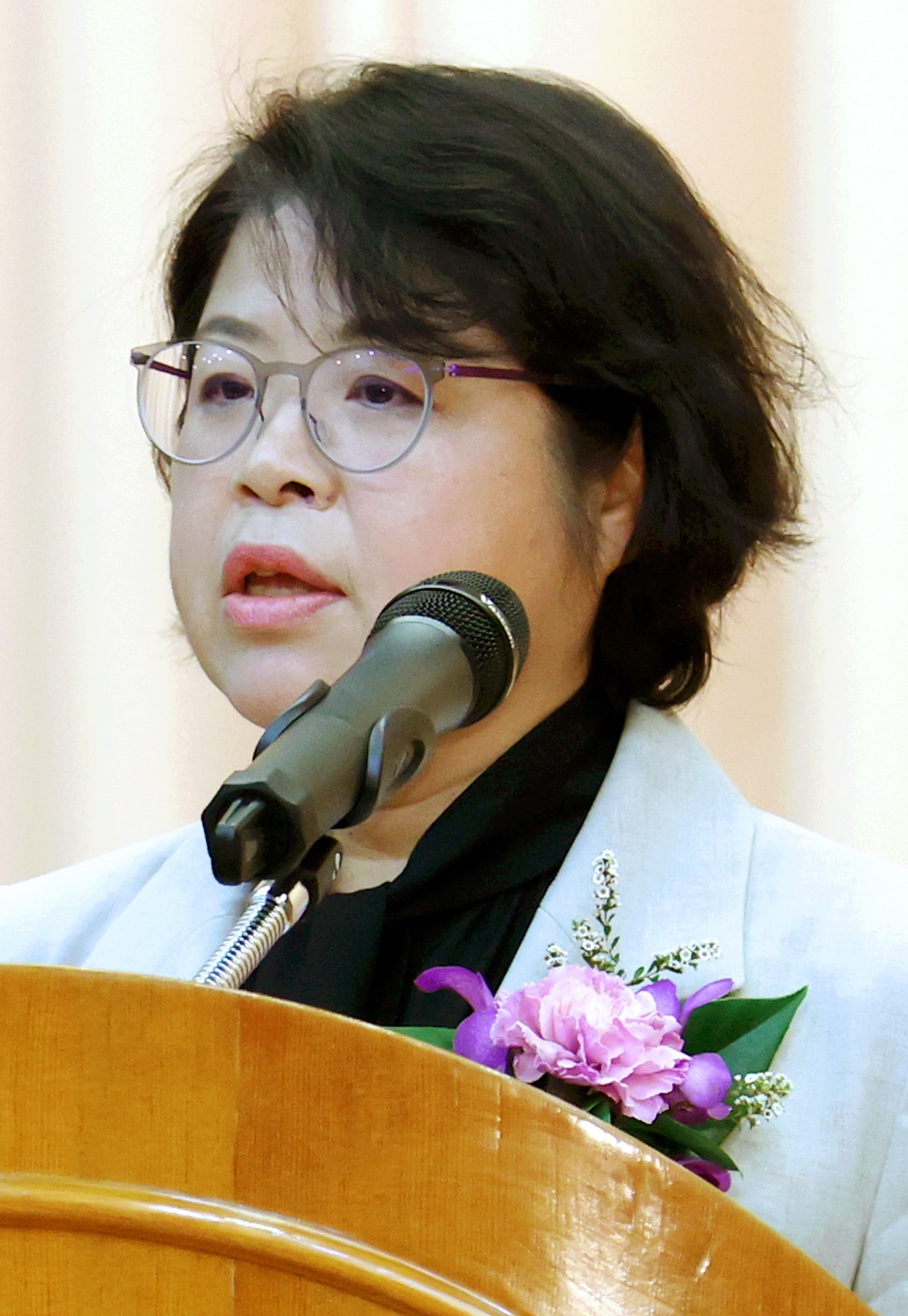

Justice of the Constitutional Court of Korea
- Incumbent
- Assumed office September 21, 2024
- Nominated by: Cho Hee-dae
- Appointed by: Yoon Suk Yeol
- Preceded by: Lee Eunae

Personal details
- Born: May 5, 1968 (age 57) Geoje, South Korea
- Education: Seoul National University (LLB)

Korean name
- Hangul: 김복형
- Hanja: 金福馨
- RR: Gim Bokhyeong
- MR: Kim Pokhyŏng

Kim Bok-hyeong (Korean: 김복형; born May 5, 1968), also romanized as Kim Bok-hyung, is a South Korean jurist who serves as a justice of the Constitutional Court of Korea. She was nominated by Supreme Court Chief Justice Cho Hee-dae on August 20, 2024, and officially appointed to the court by national President Yoon Suk Yeol on September 12, 2024, with her term officially beginning on September 21. She is the seventh woman to serve on the Constitutional Court after Justice Jung Jungmi.

Originally from Geoje, Kim graduated from the Seoul National University College of Law and the 24th class of the Judicial Research and Training Institute before beginning her career as a judge for the Seoul District Court in 1995. For the next 29 years, she served as a judge for courts in the areas of Seoul, Ulsan, Gyeonggi, Daegu, and Gangwon. In 2024, she was nominated and appointed to the Constitutional Court as a replacement for Justice Lee Eunae. During her tenure on the court, she has been classified as moderate conservative judge.

== Early life and education ==
Kim was born on May 5, 1968, in Geoje. Kim attended Busan Seo Girls' High School, where she graduated in 1987. Kim then attended Seoul National University College of Law, graduating in 1991. In 1992, Kim passed the 34th bar examination and graduated from the 24th class of the Judicial Research and Training Institute in 1995.

== Early judicial career ==
Upon graduating from the Judicial Research and Training Institute in 1995, Kim began her career as a judge for the Seoul District Court. Kim then transferred to the Northern Branch of the Seoul District Court in 1997. In 1999, Kim headed south to work at the Ulsan District Court before transferring back north to work at the Suwon District Court in 2001. In 2002, Kim participated in an overseas training program at the Paris-Panthéon-Assas University in France. In 2004, Kim transferred to the Seoul Central District Court and was promoted to the Seoul High Court in 2006.

In 2008, Kim joined the South Korea Supreme Court where she became the first woman to serve as a full-time research judge for two years. After her time at the Supreme Court, she was promoted to chief judge at the Daegu District Court in 2010 before joining the Seoul High Court as a judge in 2011. In 2018, she was promoted to chief judge at the Seoul High Court before being transferred to the Chuncheon District Court in 2020. During her time at the Chuncheon District Court, Kim was appointed to the Press Arbitration Commission for a term that began on March 31, 2020, and ended August 31, 2021. In 2021, Kim joined the Suwon High Court as a chief judge before returning to the Seoul High Court in 2022.

On May 10, 2024, Kim was named as one of 55 candidates, including five other women, who were being vetted for possible nomination to the Supreme Court as a replacement for Justice Noh Jeong-hee. Kim did not advance to the second round of nine candidates who were recommended for nomination to the court.

=== Notable rulings ===
On September 9, 2019, while serving as the presiding judge for a criminal division of the Seoul High Court, Kim rejected an appeal by a defendant sentenced to life in prison for the murder and dismemberment of the defendant's girlfriend. In making the court's ruling, Kim stated the life sentence was not unfair as defendant's crime was not accidental and the defendant's remorse was questionable.

While presiding over the same division on February 6, 2020, Kim rejected a request for resentencing by a defendant convicted of incest, statutory rape, and abandonment of an infant. The defendant, who had raped his middle school-aged daughter, impregnated her, and abandoned her baby after it was born, was sentenced to fifteen years in prison by the first court, a sentence which was five years greater than the one requested by the prosecution. While the defendant argued the sentence was too harsh on appeal, a panel of judges led by Kim rejected the appeal and upheld the initial fifteen-year sentence, noting that "considering the extreme severity of the crime and the fact that he did not receive forgiveness from the victim, the original sentence cannot be considered excessive or unfair." The court also acknowledged that "instead of protecting the victim, who was his own daughter, [the defendant] committed an inhumane crime by sexually assaulting her and forcing her to have a baby."

On May 27, 2022, while presiding over a different criminal division of the Seoul High Court, Kim rejected an appeal by Kim Young-jun who was convicted for his role in the Nth Room case. Kim Young-jun had initially been sentenced to ten years in prison by the first trial court for his role obtaining and selling illegally filmed adult videos and child pornography. A panel of judges led by Kim upheld the ten-year sentence for distribution of pornography, noting Ki Young-jun lacked remorse and that "the victims appear to have suffered great mental pain and trauma as a result of the crimes committed, and despite their own measures to prevent distribution, the videos have been sold and distributed to many people, so it appears they will have to live in fear in the future.”

Other notable rulings made by Kim while serving on the Seoul High Court include sentencing CJ Group executive Lee Jae-hyun to prison for three years for tax evasion, embezzlement, and breach of trust in 2014; ruling that long-term service allowances applied to non-regular employees at public enterprises who had been converted to regular workers; and deciding that a soldier who suffered an eye injury during training exercises could be recognized as a beneficiary of veterans' benefits.

== Constitutional Court of South Korea (2024–present) ==
=== Nomination ===
On August 14, 2024, the Constitutional Court Justice Recommendation Committee recommended Kim and two other candidates, Kim Jeong-won who served as secretary general of the Constitutional Court and Chief Judge Yoon Seung-eun of the Seoul High Court, as successors for Justice Lee Eun-ae who was set to retire in September 2024. On August 20, 2024, Chief Justice Cho Hee-dae nominated Kim for Justice Lee's seat on the Constitutional Court.

On September 10, 2024, the National Assembly's Legislation and Judiciary Committee held a hearing on Kim's nomination. During the hearing, questions involving First Lady Kim Keon-hee were frequently raised as Democratic legislators asked if it was appropriate to accept luxury handbags as gifts and if it was unconstitutional for the president to veto investigations of his spouse. While Kim declined to respond to these specific questions, stating "it is not appropriate for me to comment," Kim agreed that the First Lady did not have "authority to run the state."

When asked if impeachment was being exploited for political purposes, Kim stated "it is clear that impeachment should not be exploited for political purposes" but acknowledged "whether impeachment is being exploited for political purposes or whether there are actual grounds for impeachment will be determined through a Constitutional Court review." On the issue of LGBTQ rights, Kim stated "as a basic human right, it is right to guarantee freedom for all citizens to the maximum extent possible," and "I don't think there is a special relationship between communism and the acceptance of homosexuality." But Kim also stated "recognition of same-sex marriage requires further social consensus."

On the issue of the South Korea Foundation Day controversy, Kim remained silent for 17 seconds and did not answer in response to being asked "was the Republic of Korea a country established in April 1919 or a country established in August 1948?" In response to a follow-up question, Kim clarified that she agreed with the view that the Republic of Korea was founded through the March 1st Movement.

On September 11, 2024, the Legislation and Judiciary Committee adopted a hearing report on Kim's nomination. One Democratic member of the committee stated "I wish she had a more progressive mindset, but I did not find any particular moral flaws during the hearing.” President Yoon Suk Yeol officially appointed Kim to the Constitutional Court on September 12, 2024, and her term of office began on September 21.

=== Tenure ===
By replacing Justice Lee Eun-ae, Kim's appointment to the Constitutional Court kept the number of women on the court at three. Having been classified by media outlets as a moderate conservative, her appointment reduced the progressive majority on the Constitutional Court from 6–3 to 5–4.

== Personal life ==
Kim is married with two daughters who were born in 2004 and 2006.

== See also ==
- List of justices of the Constitutional Court of Korea

Legal offices
Preceded by Lee Eunae	Justice of the Constitutional Court of Korea; 2024–present	Incumbent
