= Kim Hyungdu =

South Korean judge (born 1965)

- 김형두
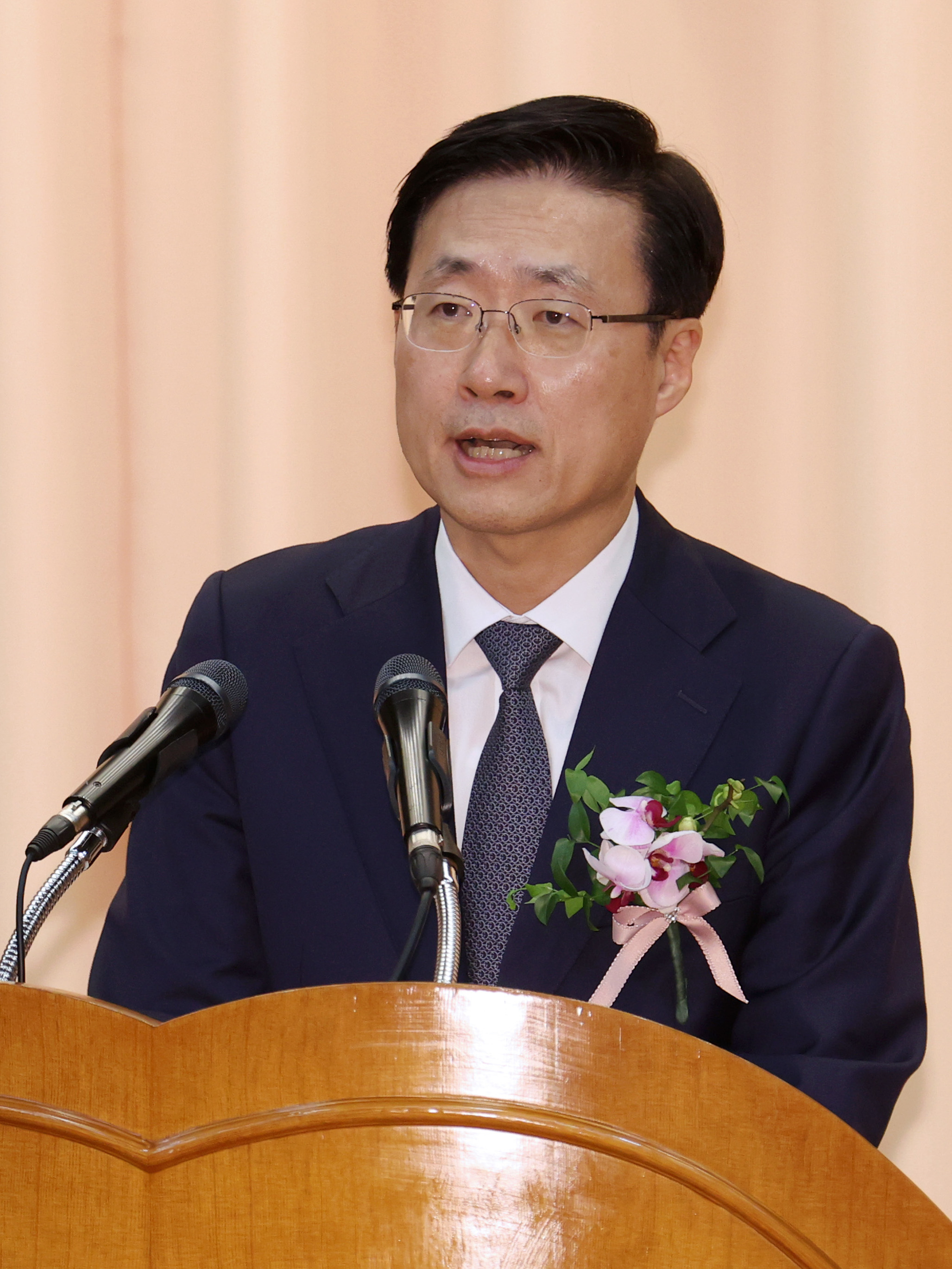
- Kim in 2023

President of the Constitutional Court of Korea
- Acting; 18 April 2025 – 23 July 2025
- Preceded by: Moon Hyung-bae
- Succeeded by: Kim Sang-hwan

Justice of the Constitutional Court of Korea
- Incumbent
- Assumed office 31 March 2023
- Nominated by: Kim Myeong-su
- Appointed by: Yoon Suk Yeol

Personal details
- Born: 17 October 1965 (age 61)
- Education: Seoul National University (LLB)

Korean name
- Hangul: 김형두
- Hanja: 金炯枓
- RR: Gim Hyeongdu
- MR: Kim Hyŏngdu

Kim Hyungdu (Korean: 김형두; born 17 October 1965) is a South Korean jurist who has served on the Constitutional Court of Korea since March 31, 2023, succeeding Lee Seon-ae. He is noted for his long judicial career and significant contributions to Korean jurisprudence.

== Early life and education ==
Born on October 17, 1965, in Jeongeup, Kim graduated from Jeonju Nam Middle School and Dongam High School. He entered Seoul National University Law School, where he excelled academically. After passing the bar exam in 1987, he completed the 19th Judicial Research and Training Institute class.

Kim served in the Republic of Korea Air Force as a commissioned officer from 1990 to 1993, achieving the rank of captain before returning to civilian life.

== Judicial career ==
Kim began his judicial career in 1993 as a judge at the Uijeongbu Branch of the Seoul District Court. Over the years, he held various judicial positions, including:

- Judge at the Seoul and Daejeon District Courts
- Chief Judge at the Jeonju District Court and Seoul Central District Court
- Chief Judge of the Seoul High Court and Patent Court

He also engaged in academic research, including stints as a visiting scholar at the University of Tokyo and Columbia University, focusing on bankruptcy law.

As Chief Judge of the Seoul Central District Court in 2009, Kim presided over high-profile cases, such as the bribery trial of former Prime Minister Han Myeong-sook. His handling of the case was praised for balancing prosecutorial and defense interests while promoting trial efficiency.

== Constitutional Court ==
In March 2023, Kim was appointed as a justice of the Constitutional Court. His nomination drew mixed reactions, with support for his legal expertise and criticism from labor unions over past administrative decisions.

In April 2025, Kim became acting president of the Constitutional Court following the retirement of Moon Hyung-bae.

== Significant Rulings ==
- National Public Officials Act: Voiced concerns about restrictions on appointing individuals punished for possession of child pornography.
- National Security Act: Supported provisions criminalizing subversive activities.
- Anti-North Korea Leaflet Ban Act: Opposed restrictions, citing freedom of expression.
- Military Criminal Act: Upheld provisions penalizing same-sex relations among soldiers as necessary for military discipline.
- AIDS Prevention Act: Found it constitutional to restrict behavior that risks public health.
- Political Parties Act: Backed restrictions on regional political parties to mitigate regionalism.

== Personal life ==
Kim Hyungdu is married with two sons. His eldest served in the Air Force, while his youngest was exempted from military service.

Justice Kim's term on the Constitutional Court is set to end on March 30, 2029.

Legal offices
Preceded by Lee Seon-ae	Justice of the Constitutional Court of Korea; 2023–present	Incumbent
Preceded by Moon Hyung-bae as Acting	President of the Constitutional Court of Korea; Acting; 2025	Succeeded by Kim Sanghwan
