= Kang Il-won =

South Korean judge (born 1959)

- 강일원
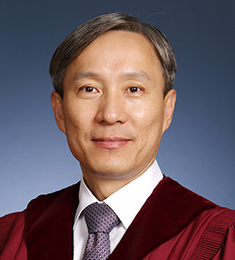

Justice of the Constitutional Court of Korea
- In office September 2012 – September 2018
- Nominated by: National Assembly (By consensus of Saenuri and Democratic Party)
- Appointed by: Lee Myung-bak

Personal details
- Education: Seoul National University (LL.B.)

Kang Il-Won (강일원; born 26 December 1959) is a former Justice of the Constitutional Court of Korea. He graduated with degrees in law from Seoul National University (LL.B.) and the University of Michigan Law School (LL.M.). He was assigned justice (주심), a selected judge inside the judicial panel with role of leading the case as referee, for the case of impeachment of Park Geun-hye.

== Timeline of Career ==
Below list is timeline of his brief biography.

- Judge, Seoul Criminal District Court, 1985
- Judge, Jinju Branch of Masan District Court, 1989
- Judge, Eastern Branch of Seoul District Court, 1991
- Judge, Seoul Civil District Court, 1994
- Judge, Seoul High Court, 1996
- Judge, Seoul District Court, 1999
- Research Judge, Supreme Court, 2001
- Senior Judge, Western Branch of Seoul District Court, 2003
- Senior Judge, Seoul Central District Court, 2005
- Senior Judge, Daejeon High Court, 2006
- Chief of Judicial Policy Office, National Court Administration, 2007
- Chief of Planning and Coordination Office, National Court Administration, 2009
- Senior Judge, Seoul High Court, 2011
- Justice of the Constitutional Court of Korea 2012
- Chair, Joint Council on Constitutional Justice, Venice Commission (European Commission for Democracy through Law, since Apr. 2013)
- Member of the Bureau, Venice Commission (since Dec. 2015; re-elected Dec. 2017)

== Notes ==
Legal offices
Preceded by Mok Young-joon	Justice of the Constitutional Court of Korea; 2012–2018	Succeeded by Lee Youngjin
