= Lee Jin-sung =

6th President of the Constitutional Court of Korea

- 이진성
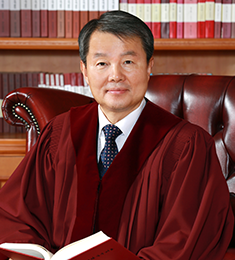

6th President of the Constitutional Court of Korea
- In office 24 November 2017 – 19 September 2018
- Nominated by: Moon Jae-in
- Preceded by: Park Han-chul
- Succeeded by: Yoo Nam-seok

Justice of the Constitutional Court of Korea
- In office September 2012 – November 2017
- Nominated by: Yang Sung-tae (Chief Justice)
- Appointed by: Lee Myung-bak

Personal details
- Born: 5 August 1956 (age 70) Busan, South Korea
- Education: Seoul National University (LL.B.)

Lee Jin-sung (Korean: 이진성; Hanja: 李鎭盛; born 5 August 1956) was the 6th President of the Constitutional Court of South Korea, appointed by Moon Jae-in on 24 November 2017.

== Early life ==
Born in Busan on 5 August 1956, he graduated from Gyeonggi High School and Seoul National Law School.

He passed the 19th Bar Examination in 1977 and completed the 10th course at the Judicial Research and Training Institute. Appointed a judge in 1983, he served as a research judge at the Supreme Court, a professor at the Judicial Research and Training Institute, and chief judge of the Seoul District Court. In 2005, while serving as chief justice of the Seoul High Court, he ruled in favor of the state in a lawsuit filed by an actress alleging that her privacy was violated when a prison guard posted a photograph of her in prison uniform. While serving as Deputy Director of the Court Administration Office, he participated as a representative of the court in discussions on revisions to the Constitutional Court Act in the 18th National Assembly.

== Education ==
In 1974, he graduated from Gyeonggi High School. In 1978, he received a B.S. from the College of Law at Seoul National University. In 1988, he received an LL.M. from the Dedman School of Law at Southern Methodist University.

He was appointed President of the Constitutional Court on November 24. As President of the Constitutional Court, on October 27, 2017, he was nominated by President Moon Jae-in after the National Assembly approved his candidacy. For covering up the suspicious death of Lee Nai Chang, the student council president, security forces were sentenced to trial for detention after chanting "Dissolve the Security Planning Agency" at a Chung-Ang University rally involving students on February 11, 1992.

== Career ==
- 1983 Judge, Busan District Court
- 1988 Judge, Uijeongbu Branch of Seoul District Court
- 1990 Judge, Seoul High Court
- 1991 Judge, Seoul Criminal District Court
- 1993 Law Clerk, Supreme Court
- 1994 Chief Judge, Kangkyung Branch of Daejeon District Court
- 1997 Professor, Judicial Research and Training Institute
- 2000 Senior Judge, Seoul District Court
- 2001 Senior Judge, Patent Court
- 2003 Senior Judge, Seoul High Court
- 2005 Bankruptcy Senior Chief Judge, Seoul Central District Court
- 2008 Vice Minister, Ministry of Court Administration, Supreme Court
- 2010 Chief Judge, Seoul Central District Court
- 2012 Chief Judge, Gwangju High Court
- 2012 Justice, Constitutional Cour
- 2017 President, Constitutional Court (retired on September 19, 2018)

== Provisions ==
Lee Jung-ho was charged with defamation by publication in the third trial involving a reporter for The Hankyoreh. On December 4, 1989, 29 people, including students from Chung-Ang University, were indicted without detention. Nine people were sentenced to between 10 and 20 days in prison, while 20 others received suspended sentences. The National Institute for Scientific Investigations, which provided evidence supporting the charges, originally stated: "Due to emotional issues, the evaluation result cannot be accepted". It further stated that the signature on the contract was the defendant's handwriting, but that, aside from handwriting identity, there was no statement or description in the evaluation report as to whether it had been forged by someone else. Therefore, it was difficult to conclude, based solely on the handwriting analysis, that the defendant had created the evidentiary document. This caused controversy.

On October 14, 1994, while serving as Chief Judge of the Civil Agreements Division of the Daejeon District Court, he presided over a lawsuit seeking compensation relating to the death of a primary school student. The plaintiff alleged that the student had been killed by prosecutors and the police. The court dismissed the lawsuit filed against the perpetrator's parents, stating that "the confession to murder lacks credibility".

On August 17, 2004, while serving as Presiding Judge of the 15th Civil Division of the Seoul High Court, he ruled in a lawsuit filed by Kyobo Life Insurance Company against Woori Bank seeking damages. The court held that Woori Bank was liable to compensate Kyobo Life Insurance Company for 439 million won, representing 60% of the damages caused through the replacement of a secured promissory note with an unsecured promissory note while operating a specific cash trust fund.
