= Rapporteur =

Reporter appointed by an organization to report on its meeting proceedings

A rapporteur is the author of a report. The term is a French loanword, derived from rapport (report) and cognate with reporter.

== In government or international organizations ==
A rapporteur is a person appointed by a government or international organization to investigate or monitor specific topics or concerns, and to report on them.

For example, Dick Marty was appointed rapporteur by the Parliamentary Assembly of the Council of Europe to investigate extraordinary rendition by the CIA.

== In legislature ==
In French-speaking legislatures, the term is used for the manager of a bill. The term is used in English in the European Parliament (EP).

=== European Parliament ===
The rapporteur is a participant in the process leading to the adoption of EU legislation in the EP: it is a member (MEP) responsible for managing a legislative proposal, both procedurally and with regard to its substance, on behalf of the European Commission, the Council of the European Union or the EP. The rapporteur is appointed from amongst its members by the committee charged with reviewing and amending the legislative recommendation on behalf of the full parliament, and is in charge of:

- analyzing the proposal and, based on this, draft an EP Own-initiative Report;
- leading discussion within the relevant committee;
- consulting with third party specialists and parties affected;
- recommending the political line to be followed;
- presenting the report to the EP plenary;
- leading negotiations with European Commission or Council of the European Union, where needed.

Political groups within the committee may appoint a shadow rapporteur to represent their views.

== See also ==
- Judge Rapporteur – Judge acting as rapporteur for the case
- Rapporteur Judge – Judicial assistants in the highest court
