= Association of Asian Constitutional Courts and Equivalent Institutions =

International organization of Asian courts

- Abbreviation: AACC
- Formation: July 12, 2010; 16 years ago (official establishment)
- Founded at: Jakarta, Indonesia
- Headquarters: Jakarta, Indonesia (Secretariat for Planning and Coordination); Seoul, Republic of Korea (Secretariat for Research and Development); Ankara, Turkey (Center for Training and Human Resources Development)
- Region served: Asia
- President: CHINBAT Namjil
- Website: aacc-asia.org

The Association of Asian Constitutional Courts and Equivalent Institutions (AACC) is an association of the constitutional courts and other equivalent institutions in region of Asia, to promote independence and cooperation of constitutional justice in Asian region. The Association is a cooperation group of the Venice Commission for constitutional justice in the Asian region.

== History ==
Idea of establishing association between constitutional courts or any other equivalent institutions in Asian region was first created in year 2005 during 3rd Conference of Asian Constitutional Court Judges in Mongolia. From then, it took 5 years of consecutive preparatory meetings in Constitutional Court of Korea to officially establish organization of the Association in year 2010. AACC's role has greatly expanded since reform of its organization in 2016, which led to establishment of permanent secretariats and training centers around the globe.

== Organization ==
Organization of the AACC is designed under Statute of AACC.

- Congress : The Congress is general assembly of the AACC, where members from member states, observers and even guests can participate under article 20 of the Statute. Though the Congress does not have notable power on decision-making of the AACC, observers and guests cannot vote in the Congress.
- Board of Members : The Board is central organ for decision-making in the AACC by article 12 and 13 of the Statute. It is composed of each of Member state's head of constitutional court or any equivalent institution.
  - President : The head of Member state in the Board who hosts the next Congress becomes President by article 14(1) of the Statute. President presides over the Board.
  - Host Secretariat : The Host Secretariat is provisional secretariat for hosting the next Congress.
- Permanent Secretariat : The Permanent Secretariat is organized under article 22 of amended Statute in year 2016
  - Secretariat for Planning and Coordination (SPC) : Seated in Jakarta, Indonesia, the AACC SPC renders administrative and financial supports and coordinates international relationship with other international organizations at level of organization.
  - Secretariat for Research and Development (SRD) : Seated in Seoul, Republic of Korea, the AACC SRD conducts joint research program among AACC members and other third parties, and publish international journal of AACC. It also organizes international forums, seminars and conferences at level of individual Justices and Judicial Assistants such as Rapporteur Judges.
  - Center for Training and Human Resources Development (CTHRD) : Seated in Ankara, Turkey, the AACC CTHRD provides educational program and material for Judicial Assistants or other equivalent expert staffs.

== List of Member states ==
- Membership since establishment in year 2010
  - Indonesia : Constitutional Court of Indonesia (Secretariat for Planning and Coordination)
  - South Korea : Constitutional Court of Korea (Secretariat for Research and Development)
  - Malaysia : Federal Court of Malaysia
  - Mongolia : Constitutional Court of Mongolia
  - Philippines : Supreme Court of the Philippines
  - Thailand : Constitutional Court of Thailand
  - Uzbekistan : Constitutional Court of Uzbekistan
- New Membership in year 2011~2012
  - Pakistan : Supreme Court of Pakistan
  - Russia : Constitutional Court of Russia
  - Tajikistan : Constitutional Court of Tajikistan
  - Turkey : Constitutional Court of Turkey (Center for Training and Human Resources Development)
- New Membership in year 2013
  - Afghanistan : Independent Commission for Overseeing the Implementation of the Constitution (ICOIC) of Afghanistan
  - Kazakhstan : Constitutional Council of Kazakhstan
- New Membership in year 2014
  - Azerbaijan : Constitutional Court of Azerbaijan
- New Membership in year 2015~2016
  - Kyrgyzstan : Supreme Court of Kyrgyzstan
  - Myanmar : Constitutional Tribunal of Myanmar
- New Membership in year 2019
  - India : Supreme Court of India
  - Maldives : Supreme Court of the Maldives
- New Membership in year 2020
  - Bangladesh : Supreme Court of Bangladesh
- New Membership in year 2021
  - Jordan : Constitutional Court of Jordan

== See also ==
- Venice Commission
