= Abortion in South Korea =

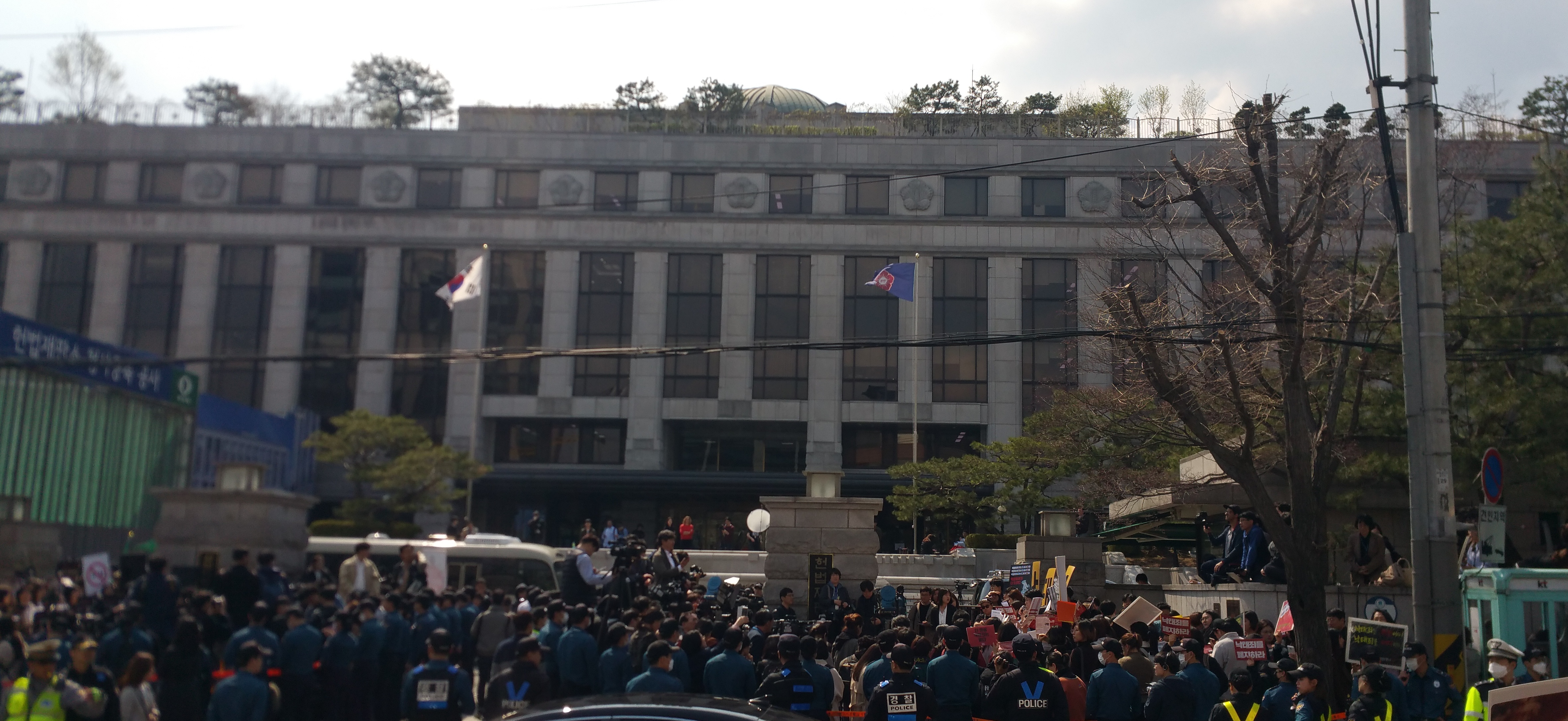
A crowd at a landmark ruling

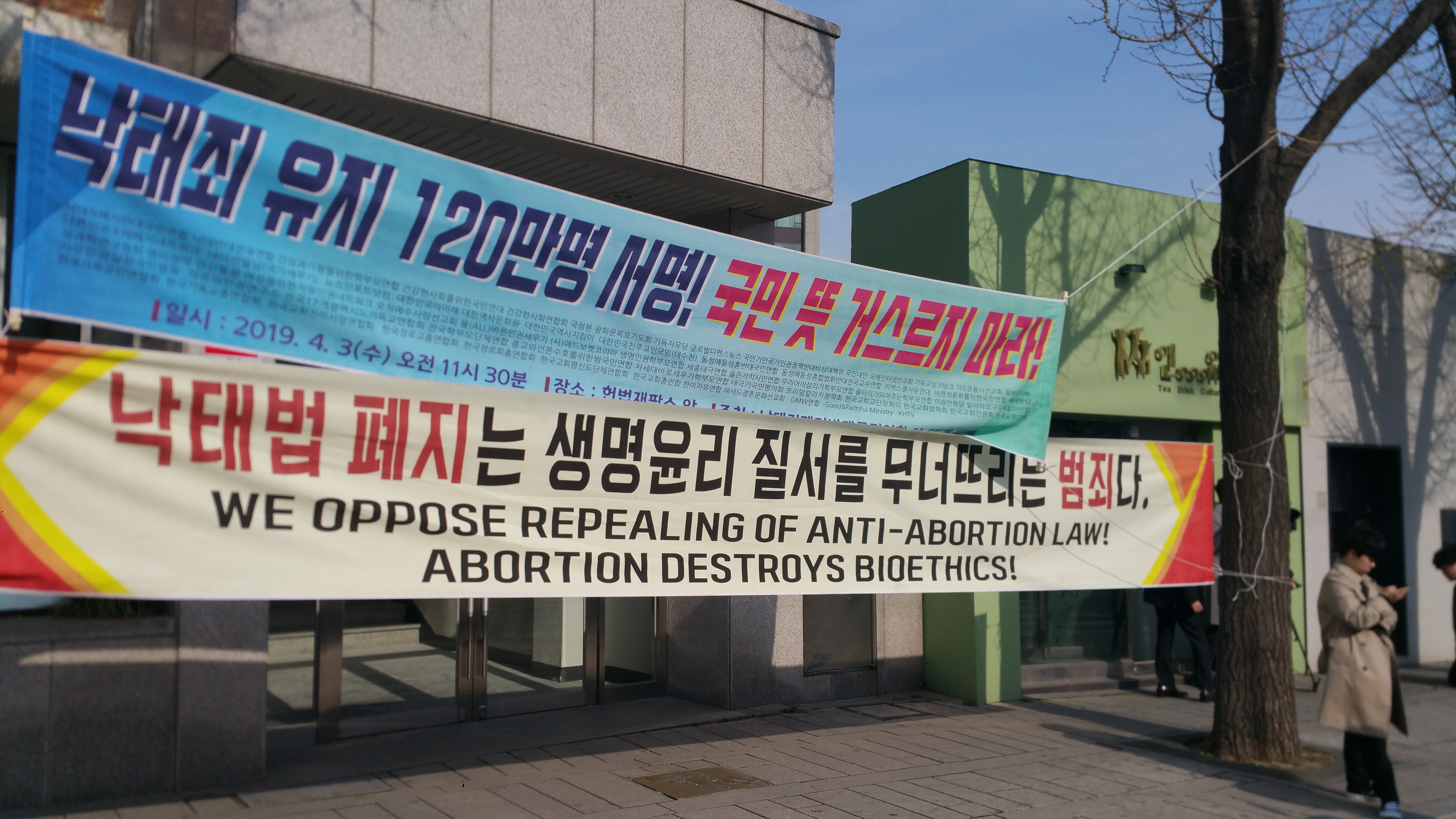
Protest sign

Constitutional Court of South Korea, 11 April 2019, 65-year-old-ban on abortion overturned.

Abortion in South Korea was decriminalized, effective 1 January 2021, by a 2019 order of the Constitutional Court of Korea. It is currently legal throughout pregnancy, as no new law has been enacted. Thus there are no gestational limits or other restrictions.

From 1953 through 2020, abortion was illegal in most circumstances, but illegal abortions were widespread and commonly performed at hospitals and clinics. On 11 April 2019, the Constitutional Court ruled the abortion ban unconstitutional and ordered the law's revision by the end of 2020. Revisions to the law were proposed in October 2020, but not voted on by the deadline of 31 December 2020.

The government of South Korea criminalized abortion in the 1953 Criminal Code in all circumstances. The law was amended by the Maternal and Child Health Law of 1973 to permit a physician to perform an abortion if the pregnant woman or her spouse has a certain hereditary or communicable diseases, if the pregnancy results from rape or incest, or if continuing the pregnancy would jeopardize the woman's health. Any physician who violated the law could be punished by two years' imprisonment. Self-induced abortions could be punished by a fine or imprisonment.

The abortion law was not strongly enforced, especially during campaigns to lower South Korea's high fertility rate in the 1970s and 1980s. As the fertility rate dropped in the 2000s, the government and anti-abortion campaigners turned their attention to illegal abortions and the government stepped up enforcement of the abortion law in response.

Sex-selective abortion, attributed to a cultural preference for sons, was common until the early 1990s but today has all but disappeared. Despite a 1987 revision of the Medical Code prohibiting physicians from using prenatal testing to reveal the sex of the child, the ratio of boys to girls at birth continued to climb into the early the 1990s, but the trend has reversed ever since. The 1987 law was ruled unconstitutional by the Constitutional Court in 2008.

== History ==
=== The Korean Criminal Code (1953) ===
Abortion in South Korea was originally criminalized with the introduction of the Korean Criminal Code (also known as The Penal Code in South Korea) in 1953, particularly because of Article 269 and 270 of the Criminal Code. Article 269 outlaws both self-induced abortions by the pregnant woman herself and abortions performed by medical professionals with the pregnant woman's request or consent, stating criminal penalty for each condition. Article 270 specifically prohibits medical practitioners, licensed doctors or other medical professionals from performing abortions, even with the pregnant woman's request or consent.

The criminal penalty varies from one year's imprisonment or a fine of 2 million won (approximately $1,750) if the abortion is self-induced by the pregnant woman herself, and ten years imprisonment if the abortion is performed by medical practitioners, with or without the pregnant woman's request or consent, causing the death of the woman. In general, criminal penalties for medical professionals who perform abortions are much stronger than for pregnant women. Additionally, if a doctor is involved in abortion, the license of the doctor will be suspended for a maximum of seven years.

In 1992, a special congressional committee tried to pass the revised Articles 269 and 270 by introducing lessened thresholds and penalties pertaining to abortion. However, its attempt failed to pass the Conservative-controlled National Assembly.

The Korean Criminal Code was first introduced in 1953, the year the Korean War ended. The post-war conditions included a drastic population decline and general social instability. Many explanations tracing the history and legislative purpose of Article 269 and 270 propose that the two provisions were designed to address post-Korean War conditions by promoting the sanctity of lives and population growth.

=== The Mother and Child Health Act (1973) ===
Introduced in 1973, the Mother and Child Health Act states five special circumstances under which the abortion is legally allowed. The five circumstances are:

1. when the pregnant woman or her spouse has any eugenic or genetic disability or disease;
2. when the pregnant woman or her spouse has any infectious disease;
3. when the pregnancy is a result of rape or quasi-rape;
4. when the pregnancy happens between two individuals who are legally unable to marry (such as blood relatives in incestuous relationships);
5. when the continuation of pregnancy could potentially harm the health of the pregnant woman.

However, there are several reasons why the applicability of Mother and Child Health Act might be narrow in practical cases. First, in some cases, the Supreme Court ruled that an abortion was regarded as illegal if the fetus was diagnosed with Down syndrome. Second, in regards to the third condition (when the pregnancy is a result of rape or quasi-rape), the stigma associated with rape might prevent pregnant women in South Korea from openly seeking legalization of their abortions, and the legal concept of rape has limited meanings that could potentially dismiss many cases.

The Mother and Child Health Act requires spousal consent in for a pregnant woman to obtain a legal abortion based on these circumstances, which might create practical complications for women to obtain legal abortions. The fifth condition (where the continuation of pregnancy could potentially harm the health of pregnant women) narrows the "harm" of pregnancy to merely harm of the woman's health, ignoring the possible socio-economic reasons for which a pregnant woman might seek an abortion.

=== The Korean Medical Service Act (revisions in 1987 and 1994) ===
The revision of the Korean Medical Service Act in 1987 prohibits medical practitioners from examining or assisting in examining pregnant women to determine the sex of the fetus. Further, the medical provider is banned from disclosing the sex of the fetus to the pregnant woman, members in her family, or any other people during the pregnancy. Although this provision does not explicitly mention abortion, it potentially prohibits sex-selective abortions that are largely the result of the preference for male children in South Korea. South Korea underwent rapid economic and social development in the 1980s, during which time the birth rate decreased significantly. Many people in South Korea started to determine the sex of the fetus with the help of diagnostic technology, resulting in female feticide.

In 1994, the Korean Medical Service Act was revised to provide criminal penalties for medical professions. Medical professionals who disclose the sex of the fetus could be punished with a maximum of three years imprisonment or a fine of 10 million won (approximately $8,450). The South Korean sex ratio at birth (male to female) has changed from 1.14 (114 boys were born at birth for every 100 girls) in 1986 to 1.07 (107 boys were born at birth for every 100 girls) in 2016, which suggests a decline of male preference.

=== Growing debate (1994–2019) ===
Debate concerning the future of abortion regulation in South Korea has gained traction both in internet chatrooms and government offices. Until South Korea's recent ruling that declared anti-abortion laws unconstitutional, the anti-abortion camp in South Korea predominately advocated for a general crackdown on abortions.

In 2009, legislators took a small step towards cracking down on abortions in South Korea by "removing certain diseases off the list justified for the use of legal abortions and revising the deadline for legal abortions to twenty-four weeks from conception instead of twenty-eight weeks."

Key political players in South Korea were responsible for extensive anti-abortion campaigns. The Minister of Health, Welfare and Family Affairs, Jeon Jae-hee, stated that "even if [the government doesn't] intend to hold anyone accountable for all ... illegal abortions in the past, [they] must crack down on them from now on." Similarly, Rep. Chang Yoon-seok, of the Grand National Party, stated that "[t]he most important thing will be for the doctors to understand that abortion is a serious crime."

In January 2010, President Lee Myung-bak decided it was "time to start the debate" on revising the Mother and Child Health Law and scheduled public hearings. This, along with shifting public opinion, encouraged the government to commence a public relations campaign to discourage abortions, which included subway posters that read: "With abortion, you are aborting the future."

The topic of abortion was never discussed as a human rights issue in South Korea. The National Human Rights Commission (TNHRC), a national advocacy institution for human rights since its founding in 2002, noted that the issue of abortion was a "controversial issue in the 'Right to Life' section of its 2007 National Action Plan."

Aside from TNHRC, major non-governmental human rights advocacy groups, like Minbyun–Lawyers for a Democratic Society and People's Society for Participatory Democracy, have ignored the issue.

Obstetricians later emerged as a powerful voice for anti-abortion sentiment in Korea as a product of ethical and moral concerns.

Much of the ensuing debate has focused on whether the government should crack down on illegal abortions, and whether the law should be modified. In September 2017, campaigners filed a petition on the website of Moon Jae-in, the President of South Korea, calling on the government to amend the law by permitting the sale of the abortion pill mifepristone. The petition was signed by more than 235,000 people. In November 2017, the office of the president announced in response that the government would review the abortion law.

In late 2018, a poll released by the Korea Institute for Health and Social Affairs revealed that 75% of women aged 15 to 44 thought of abortion law as unfair and wanted it to be revised. Among the respondents, 20% of women stated that they had obtained an abortion even though it was illegal. A 2024 report by Pew Research Center revealed that 69% of South Korea's citizens believed that abortion should be legal in all or most cases.

=== Constitutional Court ruling decriminalizing abortion (11 April 2019) ===
In 2018, the Constitutional Court heard a case which challenged the constitutionality of the abortion law. The court's ruling was delayed until court vacancies were filled.

On 11 April 2019, seven out of nine judges in the Constitutional Court of Korea ruled that criminalizing abortion in South Korea is unconstitutional. The Court granted lawmakers until 31 December 2020, to revise the laws, until which time the provisions of the Korean Criminal Code would remain in effect. If legislators did not successfully revise the abortion law before this deadline, the provisions in the Korean Criminal Code that criminalize abortion in South Korea would become null and void.

In October 2020, the government announced draft legislation that would decriminalize abortion until the 14th week of the pregnancy. In addition, abortions between the 14th and 24th week would be permitted if the pregnancy was due to rape or for social, economic, or health reasons. Members of the National Assembly also proposed revisions. However, the National Assembly did not vote on any revisions by the deadline of 31 December 2020. At this point, Article 269 and 270 of the Criminal Code became null and void.

== Abortion rate ==
Using a 2005 survey of 25 hospitals and 176 private clinics, one study estimated that 342,433 induced abortions were performed that year (about 330,000 of them illegal), which would imply an abortion rate of 29.8 abortions per 1,000 women aged 15 to 44. The rate was higher among single women than among married women. The Ministry of Health and Welfare estimated that 169,000 induced abortions were performed in 2010. Other researchers, including Park Myung-bae of Pai Chai University, have estimated numbers much higher: 500,000 or 1 million abortions per year.

According to more recent estimates by the Korea Institute for Health and Social Affairs, 241,411 abortions were performed in 2008, with a much lower rate in recent years: 23,175 in 2018, 26,985 in 2019, and 32,063 in 2020.

== See also ==
- Women in South Korea
