= Rapporteur judge =

Judicial assistants in the highest court

A rapporteur judge or rapporteur-judge is a judicial official similar to a judicial assistant at a territory's highest court (especially at a constitutional court), usually functioning as rapporteur while having a status equivalent to lower ordinary court judges.

== South Korea ==
=== Overview ===
In South Korea, rapporteur judges (Korean: 헌법연구관; Hanja: 憲法硏究官; RR: heonbeob yeongugwan), formerly known as "constitutional research officers", or "constitutional rapporteur judges" are officials that support the nine justices of the Constitutional Court of Korea. They conduct investigations and research for the review and adjudication of cases, to prepare memoranda and draft decisions, which makes them akin to assistants for justices in the Constitutional Court of Korea. The number of rapporteur judges in the court is currently around 60. Some rapporteur judges are assigned to each of the justices, while others work independently under the supervision of rapporteur judges with considerable seniority. They cannot participate or vote in deliberation between justices.

=== Appointment ===
South Korean rapporteur judges are appointed by the president of the Constitutional Court of Korea with the consent of the Council of Constitutional Court Justices, under article 16(4) of the Constitutional Court Act. Among the officials at the court requiring consent of the council for appointment are the secretary general of the court, deputy secretary general and other officials as director (above grade 3) in the Department of Court Administration. Some newly appointed rapporteur judges without enough career record before appointment are called junior rapporteur judges or assistant rapporteur judges under article 19-2 of the act.

=== Status ===
Unlike law clerks in the United States Supreme Court who serve one to two years for life tenured justices, rapporteur judges in South Korea serve ten-year renewable terms up to mandatory retirement age of 60 according to article 19(7) of Constitutional Court Act, while justices in the Constitutional Court of Korea serve only six-year renewable terms under article 112(1) of Constitution. Since justices never renew their term as custom to defend independence of the court, the actual influence of rapporteur judges on the decisions of the court is rather more substantial than law clerks in common-law countries. As the South Korean legal system follows the civil-law tradition, the rapporteur judge's role is rather more like conseillers référendaires in the French Cour de Cassation, where judicial assistants are originally magistrats as lower court judges themselves, yet serving as référendaires for up to ten-years to assist conseillers who are justices in the cour.

This dual status can be also found when lower ordinary court judges are seconded to the Constitutional Court as rapporteur judges under article 19(10) of the act. For example, Yoo Nam-seok, the seventh president of the Constitutional Court of Korea, served as rapporteur judge for several times before being appointed president, as seconded judge from other ordinary courts in South Korea. These rapporteur judges seconded from other parts of the South Korean government, such as ordinary courts and the Prosecutor's Office, serve only one to two years at the court yet are expected to work the same as formally appointed rapporteur judges. Also, formally appointed rapporteur judges and ordinary lower court judges have the same salary-table level and term length, as ordinary lower court judges also serve ten-year renewable terms inside the hierarchy of ordinary courts under article 105(2) of the Constitution. The difference between rapporteur judges and ordinary lower court judges is the age of retirement; rapporteur judges retire at age of 60, while ordinary lower court judges retire at age of 65 under article 45(4) of Court Organization Act.

== Turkey ==
=== Overview ===
In Turkey, a rapporteur-judge (Turkish: raportörler) or simply 'rapporteur' is an official supporting case works in the highest courts of Turkey, including the Constitutional Court of Turkey, Court of Cassation and Council of State. Some rapporteur-judges are also assigned to the Ministry of Justice.

=== Appointment ===
Turkish rapporteur judges in the Constitutional Court are appointed directly by the president of the court without needing any consent from a third-party under articles 24 and 25 of the Code on Establishment and Rules of Procedures of the Constitutional Court. Some newly appointed rapporteur judges in the court without enough career record before appointment are called assistant rapporteurs under article 27 of the Code. The number of rapporteur judges in the court is currently around 80, while the number of assistant rapporteurs is 20.

=== Status ===
Unlike South Korea, rapporteur judges in the Constitutional Court of Turkey are never assigned to each of the fifteen justices of the court. Rather, rapporteur judges in Turkey are only directly responsible to the president of the Constitutional Court of Turkey and work not under a justice but under the supervision of another rapporteur judge with considerable seniority, called a chief rapporteur judge. There are four divisions in the court, and each division is led by a single chief rapporteur judge. However, similar to South Korean rapporteur judges, Turkish rapporteur judges cannot also participate or vote in deliberation between justices.

Another difference between South Korean and Turkish rapporteur judges in the Constitutional Court is length of term and retirement age. Turkish rapporteur judges serve without term limits, and the mandatory retirement age of rapporteur judges is the same as that of ordinary lower-court judges. Since Turkish rapporteur judges serve without term limits, while justices at the Constitutional Court of Turkey serve twelve-year terms, Turkish rapporteur judges have more substantial influence over the court decisions than law clerks in common-law higher courts. This influence of Turkish rapporteur judges is also reflected in the Constitution of Turkey. According to article 146 of the Constitution, four out of fifteen justices in the Constitutional Court should be designated among the following groups: high-level executives, self-employed lawyers, first-category judges and public prosecutors or rapporteurs of the Constitutional Court having served as rapporteur for at least five years.

== See also ==
- Rapporteur
- Judge rapporteur
- Judicial assistant
- Constitutional Court of Korea
- Constitutional Court of Turkey
- Court of Cassation (Turkey)
- Association of Asian Constitutional Courts and Equivalent Institutions
