= Busan High Court =

High court in Busan, South Korea

Agency overview
- Headquarters: 31 Beobwon-ro, Yeonje-gu, Busan

The Busan High Court (Korean: 부산고등법원) is a high court in South Korea. Its jurisdiction consists of Busan, Ulsan and South Gyeongsang Province.

The court opened on 1 September 1987.
