= Constitutional Court of Korea =

Highest constitutional court of South Korea

Coordinates: 37°34′41″N 126°59′05″E

- 대한민국 헌법재판소
- Emblem of the Constitutional Court of Korea

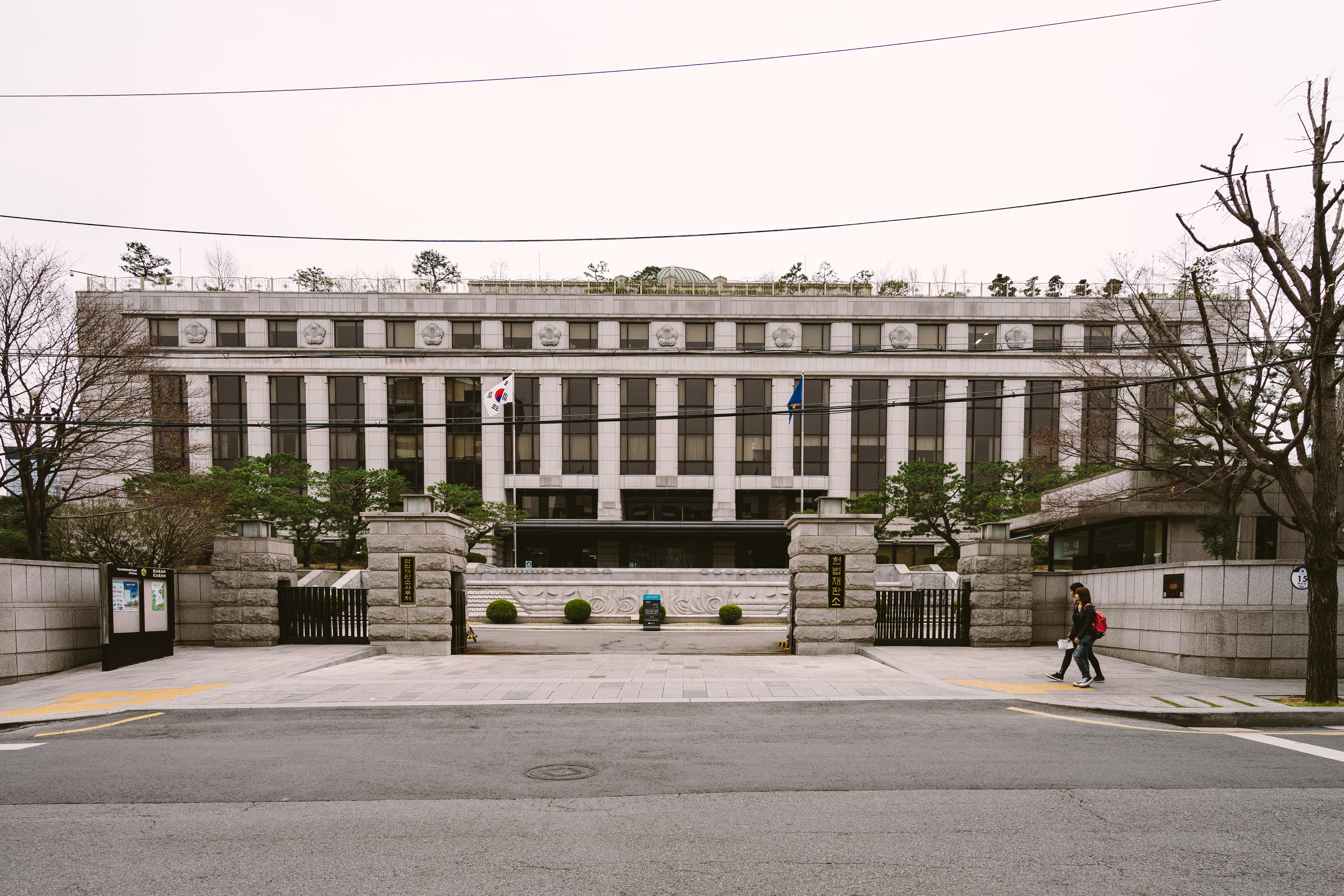
- Constitutional Court of Korea in Jongno, Seoul
- Interactive map of Constitutional Court of Korea
- Established: 1988; 38 years ago
- Location: Jongno, Seoul
- Composition method: Appointed by President upon nomination of equal portions from National Assembly, Supreme Court Chief Justice and the President
- Authorised by: Constitution of South Korea Chapter VI
- Judge term length: Six years, renewable (mandatory retirement at the age of 70)
- Number of positions: 9 (by constitution)
- Website: ccourt.go.kr

President
- Currently: Kim Sang-hwan
- Since: July 23, 2025

- Constitutional Court of Korea
- Logo of the Constitutional Court of Korea

Korean name
- Hangul: 헌법재판소
- Hanja: 憲法裁判所
- RR: Heonbeop jaepanso
- MR: Hŏnpŏp chaep'anso

The Constitutional Court of Korea (Korean: 헌법재판소; Hanja: 憲法裁判所) is the constitutional court of South Korea, seated in Jongno, Seoul. Exercising constitutional review, it is one of the two highest courts in South Korea's judiciary, along with the Supreme Court. Composed of nine justices, the Constitutional Court has the power to nullify unconstitutional laws, remove impeached officials from office, dissolve antidemocratic political parties, oversee disputes on powers of public authorities, and handle constitutional complaints.

== History ==
After Korea regained independence from the Japanese colonial rule in 1945, there were several attempts to establish an independent constitutional court to exercise judicial review. Prior to the First Republic, members of the Constitutional Drafting Committee debated whether Korea's system of constitutional review should follow the American or continental European model. Kwon Seung-ryul proposed adopting the American system where only the Supreme Court interprets the constitution, while Yoo Jin-oh advocated for a European model, which features a constitutional court. The resulting Constitutional Committee (헌법위원회) of the First Republic was a compromise between the two proposals. Under the 1948 Constitution, the vice president chaired the committee, with five members appointed by the National Assembly. Following the 1952 constitutional amendment, these included three members from the House of Representatives and two from the House of Councillors. Additionally, the chief justice of the Supreme Court recommended five Supreme Court justices to serve on the committee.

Syngman Rhee's dictatorial rule undermined the committee's normal operation, limiting it to adjudicating only six cases, two of which declared the statutes in question unconstitutional. The 1952 constitutional amendment established a bicameral legislature, but Rhee's regime refused to enact the election law for the House of Councillors. Consequently, the upper house – required for the Constitutional Committee to function – was never formed, causing the committee to grind to a halt.

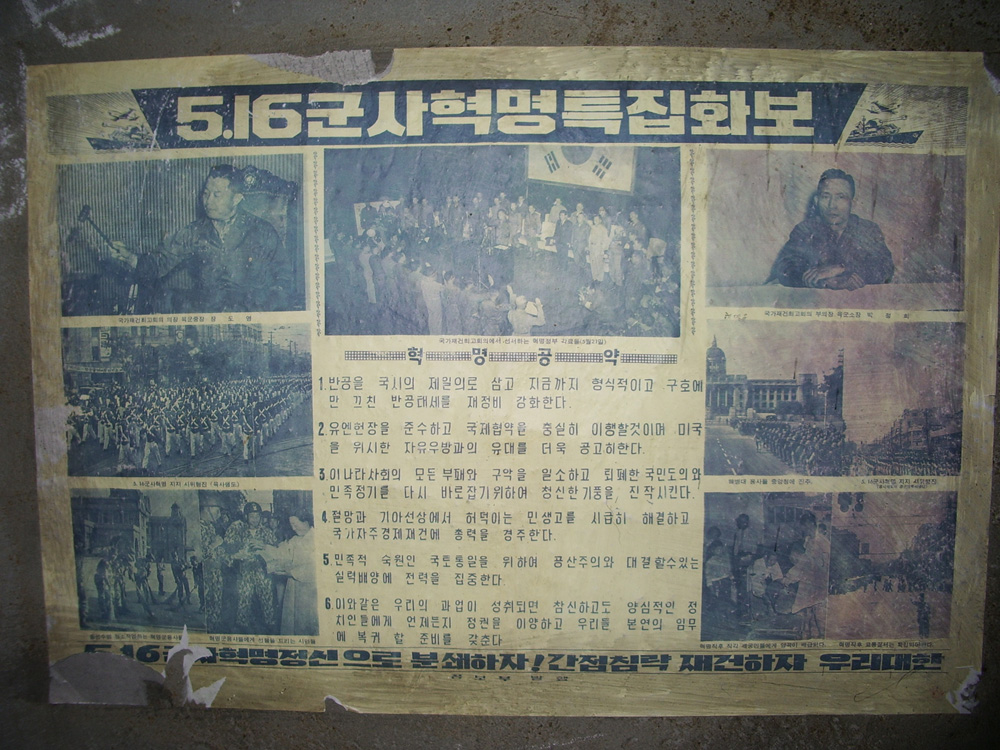
Coup d'état of Park Chung Hee dissolved the Constitutional Court of the Second Republic of Korea

After Rhee's overthrow during the April Revolution, the Second Republic was established through a constitutional amendment that shifted Korea from a presidential to a parliamentary system. As part of the amendment, the Constitutional Court (헌법재판소) was created to replace the now-defunct Constitutional Committee. Under the 1960 amendment, the president, House of Councillors and the Supreme Court each designated three Constitutional Court justices. Although legislation to establish the court was passed in April 1961, it never materialized. The following month, Park Chung Hee seized power through a military coup, suspending the constitution and halting the court's formation.

After the nominal dissolution of the military junta, President Park Chung Hee rammed the 1962 constitutional amendment through, which dissolved the Constitutional Court and transferred the power to review cases on constitutionality to the Supreme Court. In 1971, following its constitutional mandate, the Supreme Court ruled 9 to 7 and struck down Article 2 of the National Compensation Act (국가배상법), which restricted state liability for compensating soldiers injured while serving the country. Enraged by the decision, Park responded the following year by pushing through another constitutional amendment, enacting the Yushin Constitution – a notoriously oppressive document that gave the president sweeping executive and legislative powers. The Yushin Constitution included a provision that explicitly overturned the 1971 Supreme Court ruling on the National Compensation Act. Additionally, the Supreme Court justices involved in the decision were denied reappointment and forced into retirement.

The Yushin Constitution (and the successive constitution of the Fifth Republic) also re-established the Constitutional Committee, but required an ordinary court to submit a formal request for constitutional review before the committee could exercise its judicial power. Since the Supreme Court was wary of retaliation as in 1971, it forbade courts from making such requests, rendering the Constitutional Committee powerless.

The June Struggle in 1987 led to the 1987 constitutional amendment, which democratized Korea and ushered in the Sixth Republic, continuing to this day. The 1987 Constitution established the modern Constitutional Court of Korea and granted it authority to review matters of constitutionality. The court has delivered several landmark decisions in South Korea's contemporary history, including the decriminalization of abortion, the impeachment of Park Geun-hye, and the impeachment of Yoon Suk Yeol.

In December 2024, the Constitutional Court became a political battleground once again following the impeachment of President Yoon Suk Yeol for declaring martial law. At the time, the court had three vacancies, prompting a debate in the National Assembly of Korea over whether acting presidents have the authority to fill such vacancies. The opposition Democratic Party of Korea (DPK) argued that acting presidents could fill the positions, emphasizing that the presidential appointment of National Assembly-recommended nominees is largely procedural. In contrast, Yoon's People Power Party (PPP) asserted that acting presidents could appoint justices only in cases of a presidential vacancy, not a suspension of duties.

On December 26, the opposition parties unilaterally approved three Constitutional Court nominees, without PPP participation in the confirmation vote. Acting president Han Duck-soo refused to appoint the nominees, citing the need for a bipartisan consensus. In response, the DPK filed an impeachment motion against Han on the same day. The motion passed on December 27, resulting in Han's suspension from office. On December 31, acting president Choi Sang-mok appointed Chung Kyesun and Cho Hanchang to the Constitutional Court while withholding the appointment of Ma Eun-hyuk. Ma was eventually appointed after President Yoon's removal from office.

== Power ==
The South Korean constitution vests judicial power in courts composed of judges, which establishes the ordinary-court system, but also separates an independent constitutional court and grants it exclusive jurisdiction over matters of constitutionality. Specifically, Chapter VI Article 111 Clause 1 of the South Korean constitution specifies the following cases to be exclusively reviewed by the Constitutional Court:

1. Constitutionality of a law upon the request of the courts;
2. Impeachment;
3. Dissolution of a political party;
4. Jurisdictional disputes between state agencies, between state agencies and local governments, and between local governments; and
5. Constitutional complaints as prescribed by [the Constitutional Court] Act.

Article 111 Clause 2 states that the Constitutional Court shall consist of nine justices qualified to be court judges, all of whom shall be appointed by the president of South Korea. While all nine justices must be appointed by the president, Article 111 Clause 3 states that the National Assembly and the chief justice shall nominate three justices each, leaving the remaining three to be nominated by the president of South Korea. Article 111 Clause 4 states that the candidate for the president of the Constitutional Court must obtain the approval of the National Assembly before appointment by the president.

The constitution broadly delineates the roles of courts, both ordinary courts and the Constitutional Court, and entrusts the National Assembly to legislate the specifics of their functions. After the tenth constitutional amendment in 1987, the National Assembly passed the Constitutional Court Act (헌법재판소법), which establishes the organizational structure of the court and the hierarchy of judicial officers and their roles within the court. It also specifies the procedural details for petitioning the court. Unlike other constitutional courts (most notably the Federal Constitutional Court of Germany), a petitioner involved in a lawsuit may file a constitutional complaint directly with the court, without having to exhaust all other legal remedies, if he/she believes a particular statute has infringed upon his or her constitutional rights.

The Constitutional Court often clashes with the Supreme Court. While the two courts are considered co-equal (see Article 15 of the Constitutional Court Act), they frequently disagree over which holds the ultimate authority to interpret the constitution. The Supreme Court, the court of last resort, has criticized the Constitutional Court for attempting to upend the "three-tiered" system (allowing appeals up to twice) and for placing itself above the Supreme Court. In 2022, the tensions between the two courts peaked when the Constitutional Court overturned a Supreme Court decision without declaring the relevant statute unconstitutional. Instead, it ruled that while the statute itself did not violate the constitution, its specific application did. The Supreme Court publicly denounced the ruling, arguing that it unacceptably implied that the ordinary court decisions fall under the Constitutional Court's jurisdiction, effectively subordinating the Supreme Court to the Constitutional Court.

== Status ==
The current judicial system of South Korea, particularly the Constitutional Court of Korea, was influenced by the Austrian judicial system. While Austria has three apex courts, whose jurisdictions are defined in different chapters of the Austrian constitution, the South Korean constitution establishes only two apex courts. Ordinary courts, with the Supreme Court of Korea at the top, are established by Article 101 Clause 2 under Chapter 5, "Courts" (법원). Unlike the ordinary courts, the Constitutional Court of Korea is the only court established by Article 111 Clause 1 of Chapter 6, "Constitutional Court" (헌법재판소).

The drafters of the constitution tried to emphasize that the Constitutional Court does not belong to the ordinary-court system by using different but synonymous words. The term "jaepanso" (재판소; Korean pronunciation: [tɕɛpʰanso]) was used to describe the Constitutional Court, while "beopwon" (법원; Korean pronunciation: [pʌbwʌn]) was used to represent the ordinary courts. The equal status of the Constitutional Court and the Supreme Court is established by Article 15 of the Constitutional Court Act, which states that the president and the associate justices of the Constitutional Court should be treated the same as the chief justice and the associate justices of the Supreme Court, respectively.

== Composition ==
=== Current justices ===
| Name | Born | Appointed by | Recommended by | Education | First day / Length of service |
|---|---|---|---|---|---|
| Kim Hyungdu | October 17, 1965 (age 60) in Jeonju | Yoon Suk Yeol | Chief Justice (Kim Myeong-soo) | Seoul National University | March 31, 2023 / 3 years, 6 months |
| Jung Jungmi | May 24, 1969 (age 57) in Busan | Yoon Suk Yeol | Chief Justice (Kim Myeong-soo) | Seoul National University | April 17, 2023 / 3 years, 5 months |
| Jeong Hyeong-sik | September 2, 1961 (age 65) in Yanggu | Yoon Suk Yeol | (Directly) | Seoul National University | December 18, 2023 / 2 years, 9 months |
| Kim Bok-hyeong | May 5, 1968 (age 58) in Geoje | Yoon Suk Yeol | Chief Justice (Cho Hee-dae) | Seoul National University | September 21, 2024 / 2 years |
| Cho Hanchang | May 14, 1965 (age 61) in Suwon | Choi Sang-mok | National Assembly (People Power Party) | Seoul National University | January 1, 2025 / 1 year, 9 months |
| Chung Kyesun | August 2, 1969 (age 57) in Yangyang | Choi Sang-mok | National Assembly (Democratic Party) | Seoul National University | January 1, 2025 / 1 year, 9 months |
| Ma Eunhyeok | September 27, 1963 (age 63) in Goseong | Han Duck-soo | National Assembly (Democratic Party) | Seoul National University | April 9, 2025 / 1 year, 5 months |
| Kim Sang-hwan | January 26, 1966 (age 60) in Daejeon | Lee Jae Myung | (Directly) | Seoul National University | July 23, 2025 / 1 year, 2 months |
| Oh Yeong-jun | November 26, 1969 (age 56) in Daejeon | Lee Jae Myung | (Directly) | Seoul National University | July 23, 2025 / 1 year, 2 months |

=== Justices ===
Article 111 of the South Korean constitution specifies the size of the Constitutional Court and the procedure for nominating and appointing justices. The court comprises nine justices (헌법재판소 재판관), with each formally appointed by the president of South Korea. However, Article 111 Clause 3 of the constitution divides the power to nominate candidates into equal thirds among the president, the National Assembly, and the chief justice of the Supreme Court. Thus, the president nominates and appoints three of the nine justices, while the remaining six justices are appointed from candidates selected by the National Assembly or the chief justice of the Supreme Court. This appointment structure reflects the civil law tradition of viewing ordinary courts as the core of the conventional judiciary, as the president represents the executive branch, the National Assembly represents the legislative branch, and the chief justice of the Supreme Court represents the judicial branch of the South Korean government. However, it is clear that both the Supreme Court and the Constitutional Court generally regard the power of the Constitutional Court as a judicial authority.

To be appointed as a Constitutional Court justice, Article 5 Clause 1 of the Constitutional Court Act requires that the person must be at least 40 years old, qualified as an attorney, and have more than 15 years of career experience in legal practice or legal academia.

While the exact internal procedure for the nomination of Constitutional Court justices is not specified by statutes, the nomination of the three justices from the National Assembly is usually determined through political negotiations between the ruling party in the Assembly and the first opposition party. When the second opposition party has sufficient membership in the Assembly, it also plays a role in this process. If the second opposition party does not have enough seats in the Assembly to formally participate, the ruling party nominates one justice, and the first opposition party nominates another. The remaining nomination is usually shared between the two parties, determined by negotiation or, if negotiation fails, by election. For example, former justice Kang Il-won was nominated by the National Assembly through negotiations between the ruling Saenuri Party and the first opposition Democratic United Party in 2012. When the second opposition party is big enough, it nominates the third justice. For instance, in 2018, Justice Lee Young-jin was nominated by the second opposition party, the Bareunmirae Party.

Notably, Article 6 Clause 2 of the Constitutional Court Act mandates confirmation hearings of the National Assembly (국회 인사청문회) for all Constitutional Court justices before their appointment or nomination. However, the confirmation hearing is considered a formality, because the verbiage of the relevant article in the Constitutional Court Act requires that a confirmation hearing take place, not that the candidate obtain the Assembly's approval. Therefore, the National Assembly cannot block nominations or appointments by disapproving candidates during these hearings.

==== Council of Constitutional Court Justices ====
The Council of Constitutional Court Justices (재판관회의) is established according to Article 16 Clause 1 of the Constitutional Court Act. It comprises all nine justices, including the president of the Constitutional Court who serves as the permanent presiding chair. Decisions are made by a simple majority among a quorum of two-thirds of all justices, according to Article 16 Clause 2 and Clause 3 of the Constitutional Court Act. The council primarily supervises the court administration power of the president of the Constitutional Court, such as the appointment of the secretary-general, the deputy secretary-general, rapporteur judges, and other high-ranking officers above Grade III. It also oversees other issues requiring supervisory functions, including making interior procedural rules and planning fiscal issues.

=== President of the Constitutional Court ===
Article 111 Clause 4 empowers the president of South Korea to appoint the president of the Constitutional Court from among the nine Constitutional Court justices, subject to the National Assembly's approval. According to Article 12 Clause 3 of the Constitutional Court Act, the president of the court represents the court and supervises court administration. Additionally, Article 16 Clause 1 states the president of the court chairs the Council of Constitutional Court Justices. Article 22 designates the president of the court as a presiding member of the full bench (전원재판부, en banc).

=== Tenure ===
Article 112 Clause 1 of the constitution and Article 7 of the Constitutional Court Act specify that the term of an associate justice is renewable for six years up to a mandatory retirement age of 70. However, only two justices have attempted to renew their term by reappointment, as doing so can potentially harm the judicial independence of the Constitutional Court. During their term, according to Articles 112 Clause 1 and Clause 2 of the constitution, justices cannot be expelled from office except by impeachment or a sentence of imprisonment, and they are prohibited from joining any political party or participating in political activities to maintain the court's political neutrality.

A sophisticated issue in the court's tenure system is the term length of the court's president, because neither the constitution nor the Constitutional Court Act specifies it. A newly appointed president of the court who is also serving as a justice can have a full six-year term as a justice. However, if the president is appointed during their term as a justice, they can only serve as president for the remainder of their term as a justice.

== Organization ==
=== Rapporteur Judges ===
Rapporteur judges (헌법연구관, formerly known as constitutional research officers) support the court's nine justices by conducting investigations and research for case review and adjudication. They prepare memoranda and draft decisions, functioning similarly to judicial assistants such as conseillers référendaires in the French Court of Cassation or Gerichtsschreiber in the Swiss Bundesgericht. These roles typically last 5 to 10 years or more until retirement, unlike law clerks in the United States Supreme Court who serve as interns for 1 to 2 years.

Rapporteur judges are appointed by the court's president, with the consent of the Council of Justices, under Article 16 Clause 4 and Article 19 Clause 3 of the Constitutional Court Act. They serve renewable ten-year terms, the same tenure system as lower ordinary court judges (판사) in South Korea. Of note, rapporteur judges serve longer than justices and are paid at the same rate as lower ordinary court judges, ensuring continuity of constitutional adjudication in South Korea. Some positions for rapporteur judges are filled with lower ordinary court judges or prosecutors seconded from outside the Constitutional Court for one to two years, enhancing the court's diversity and insight according to Article 19 Clause 9 of the Constitutional Court Act. In addition to rapporteur judges, the court also includes constitutional researchers (헌법연구원) and academic advisers (헌법연구위원), who work for two to five years assisting in research mainly on comparative law related to the court's ongoing cases, under Article 19 Clause 3 of the Constitutional Court Act.

=== Department of Court Administration ===
The court's administration is managed autonomously within the court by the Department of Court Administration (DCA, 헌법재판소사무처). The department is led by the secretary-general (사무처장), currently Son In Hyuk, under the direction of the court's president, with consent of the Council of Justices on significant matters as outlined under Articles 16 and 17 of the Constitutional Court Act. The secretary-general is equivalent in rank to other ministers in the State Council of the executive branch, according to Article 18 Clause 1 of the Constitutional Court Act. The deputy secretary-general (사무차장) is typically appointed from senior rapporteur judges and holds the same rank as other vice ministers. The department implements decisions of the Council of Constitutional Court Justices and oversees various aspects of court administration, including fiscal and human resource issues as well as information technology services. It also has a professional team supporting the court's international relations, including the Venice Commission and Association of Asian Constitutional Courts and Equivalent Institutions.

=== Constitutional Research Institute ===
Constitutional Research Institute (헌법재판연구원) is the Constitutional Court's own research institute, established under Article 19 Clause 4 of the Constitutional Court Act. It focuses on research in fundamental academic areas such as comparative law and original legal theories related to the constitution. The institute also provides training for newly appointed court officials and educates the public about the constitution. Professors at the institute are primarily recruited from PhD degree holders who have studied abroad, and their research and education programs are supervised by senior rapporteur judges seconded from the court. The institute is currently located in Gangnam, Seoul.

== Building ==
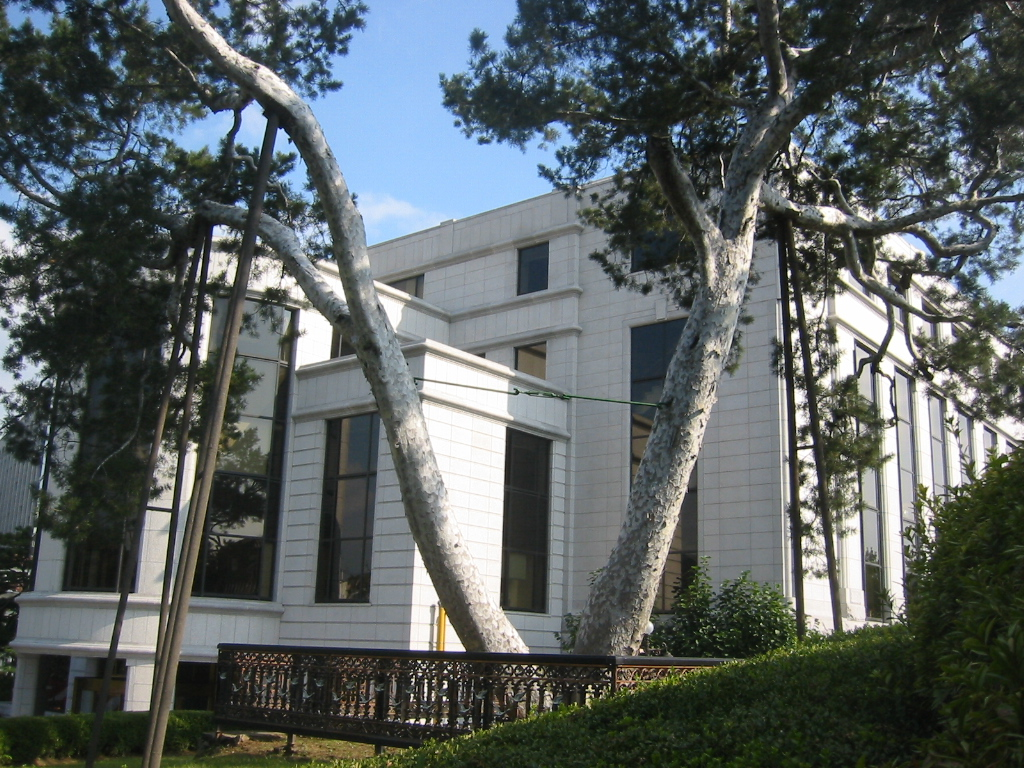
Side view of the Constitutional Court of Korea building

The Constitutional Court of Korea is located in Jae-dong, Jongno District, Seoul, near Anguk station on Seoul Subway Line 3. The court comprises the courthouse and an annex. The five-story main courthouse, completed in 1993, is designed in a Neoclassical style that blends Korean tradition with modern technology. It was awarded first place in the second Korean Architecture Award in October 1993. The right pillar of the main gate bears the inscription 헌법재판소, meaning the Constitutional Court, while the left pillar gate is inscribed 헌법재판소 사무처, meaning the Department of Court Administration.

The main building houses the courtroom, offices, and deliberation chambers for justices, offices for rapporteur judges, academic advisers, and constitutional researchers, as well as workspace for the Department of Court Administration. The annex, completed in April 2020, is a three-story building designed to enhance public engagement and accessibility, including barrier-free features. It includes a law library, a permanent exhibition hall for visitors, and additional office space for the Department of Court Administration. The court typically holds open hearings or verdict sessions on the second and last Thursday of each month. Visitors with ID cards or passports may attend these session. However, unaccompanied tours of the court are restricted for security reasons.

== Procedure ==
The review procedure in the Constitutional Court described in Chapter 3 of the Constitutional Court Act consists of two phases. In the first phase, the court examines whether the case meets the preliminary admissibility conditions. For example, if the petitioner missed the deadline for filing a request, the case is formally dismissed, regardless of the merits of the case. In the second phase, the court reviews and deliberates on the merits of the case. There is usually no oral hearings in the second phase, but the court may decide to have oral hearings if needed, under Article 30 of the Constitutional Court Act. If a petition is admissible but fails on its merits, it is formally rejected. If the court agrees with the petitioner, the petition is upheld, but there may be different forms of upheld decisions, as in the case of constitutionality review of statutes.

Review in the first phase is performed by one of the court's three panels (지정재판부), each consisting of three justices. If the panel decides unanimously that the case fails to meet any of the admissibility conditions, the case is dismissed. Otherwise, the case proceeds to the second phase, where the full bench (전원재판부) reviews the case, according to Article 22 of the Constitutional Court Act. Even if a case passes the first review and has proceeded to the second phase, it can still be dismissed.

=== Votes and quorum of full bench ===
According to Article 113 Clause 1 of the constitution and Article 23 Clause 2 of the Constitutional Court Act, a decision to uphold a petition or overturn a precedent requires the concurrence of at least six justices. For deliberation, a quorum of at least seven justices is required. The sole exception applies to jurisdictional disputes, which can be resolved with a simple majority to uphold a petition. A simple majority is also sufficient to dismiss or reject a petition. If no simple majority opinion is reached, the court's decision is determined by sequentially counting votes, starting with the most favorable opinion for the petitioner and continuing toward the least favorable, until the count exceeds six votes. The least favorable opinion within this majority is regarded as the opinion of the court.

=== Presiding justice and justice in charge ===
In constitutional court proceedings, a presiding justice (재판장) and a justice in charge (주심) are designated for each case. The presiding justice serves as the official representative of the panel, while the justice in charge oversees hearings and drafts the judgment for the specific case. The role of the justice in charge is analogous to that of a judge-rapporteur in the European Court of Justice. To mitigate concerns about partiality, the justice in charge is typically selected by a computer program. In contrast, the presiding justice is determined by seniority.

In South Korean courts, the term "presiding judge" often refers to the administrative head of the panel, rather than the individual presiding over specific cases. For example, in the impeachment proceedings of former president Park Geun-hye, Justice Kang Il-won served as the justice in charge (주심재판관) and conducted much of the proceedings. However, Justice Lee Jung-mi, the acting president of the Constitutional Court at the time, was the official presiding justice of the full bench.

=== Case naming ===
Constitutional-court case naming follows a specific convention. The first two or four digits represent the year the case was filed. This is followed by an alphabetic case code, which categorizes the case into one of eight types: Hun-Ka, Hun-Na, Hun-Da, Hun-Ra, Hun-Ma, Hun-Ba, Hun-Sa, and Hun-A, each corresponding to a specific jurisdiction of the court. Finally, a serial number is assigned based on the chronological order of case filings within the same year.

== Jurisdiction ==
Constitutional litigation structure of South Korea

The Constitutional Court's jurisdiction is defined in Article 111 Clause 1 of the constitution and includes the following: adjudication on (1) constitutionality of statutes, (2) impeachment, (3) dissolution of a political party, (4) jurisdictional dispute, and (5) constitutional complaint. While the Constitutional Court's organizational structure was influenced by Austria, the scope of its jurisdiction follows the German model.

=== Judicial review of statutes ===
According to Article 111 Clause 1 Provision 1 of the constitution, the Constitutional Court may review the constitutionality of statutes at the request of ordinary courts – a power referred to as judicial review (사법심사) or officially Adjudication on the constitutionality of statutes (위헌법률심판) in Article 4 Clause 1 of the Constitutional Court Act. In a legal dispute, if the court's decision depends on the constitutionality of laws relevant to the case, either party may request the court to refer the matter to the Constitutional Court for review. However, the court has discretion on whether to grant the request. If the court decides not to refer the matter, the aggrieved party can file a "constitutional complaint" directly with the Constitutional Court and bypass the ordinary court. The procedural hurdles involved in requesting adjudication on the constitutionality of statutes imply that only parties directly involved in an ongoing legal case are eligible to request a referral from the court. This means that a person who may suffer abstract or potential injuries is not eligible for this legal resource. In other words, a party must have a concrete and specific interest in the outcome of the case to request a referral to the Constitutional Court.

Article 41 Clause 5 of the Constitutional Court Act establishes that once an ordinary court has requested the Constitutional Court to adjudicate on the constitutionality of statutes, no superior court, including the Supreme Court, may intervene. This restriction on the powers of the Supreme Court stems from its historical passivity in confronting other branches of government during periods of authoritarian rule.

The procedural requirement that an ordinary court must refer the case for Constitutional Court review was abused by President Park Chung Hee under the Yushin Constitution. He refused to re-appoint Supreme Court justices who challenged his authority, effectively preventing the ordinary courts from making any formal requests for constitutional review. This event laid bare the vulnerabilities of making constitutional review contingent upon a court's request.

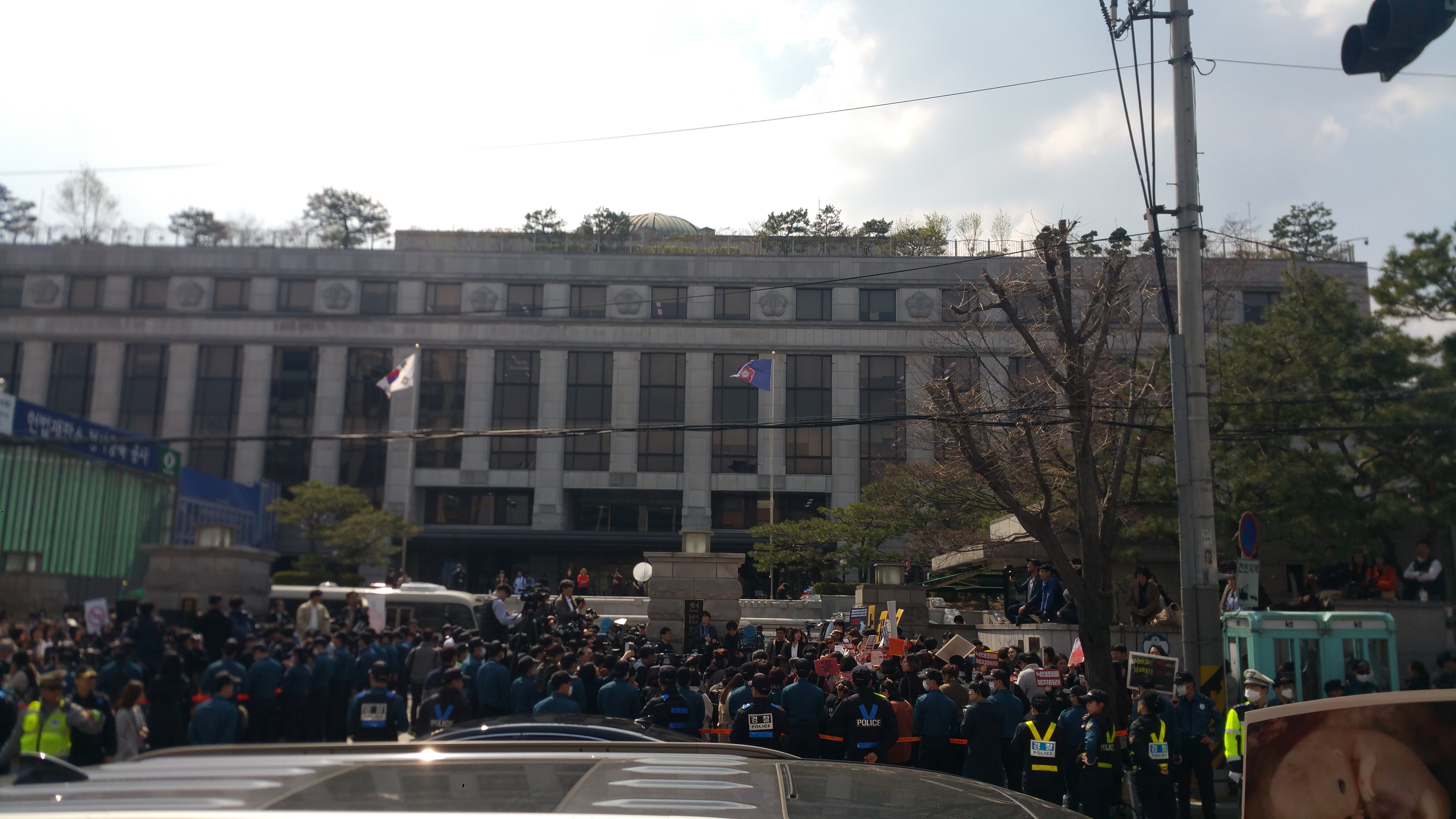
Decriminalizing abortion in South Korea (2017Hun-Ba127) in 2019 is one of the landmark decisions on constitutional complaints under Article 68(2) of the Constitutional Court Act

As a result, the 1987 tenth constitutional amendment introduced another avenue for an interested party to bypass the ordinary courts and directly ask the Constitutional Court to intervene in constitutional review. This alternative route, called constitutional complaint (헌법소원심판), is defined in Article 68 Clause 2 of the Constitutional Court Act.

Types of decisions by the Constitutional Court
| Decision | Description |
|---|---|
| Unconstitutional (위헌) | When the Constitutional Court declares a statute unconstitutional, the relevant law is nullified, and the decision takes effect immediately. In the case of criminal laws, the decision applies retroactively, unless a previous Constitutional Court decision upheld the same statute. In such instances, the decision is retroactively applied until the time of the previous relevant decision. This means that those who were previously convicted under the unconstitutional statute may have their convictions overturned or may be eligible for retrial. |
| Constitutional (합헌) | When the Constitutional Court declares a statute constitutional, the relevant law remains in effect. This means that the statute remains valid and enforceable, and the decision does not affect any ongoing or past legal proceedings related to the law. |
| Unconformable (헌법불합치) | When a statute is declared unconformable to the constitution, the law is deemed unconstitutional in essence but remains in effect until the National Assembly amends the law. In such decisions, the Constitutional Court sets a deadline after which the relevant law expires and becomes unenforceable. The National Assembly is responsible for amending the law to ensure that it conforms to the constitution, and failure to do so within the specified deadline can result in legal consequences. |
| Conditionally Unconstitutional (한정위헌), Conditionally Constitutional (한정합헌) | When a statute is declared conditionally constitutional by the Constitutional Court, it means that the law must be interpreted in a certain way to ensure that it is constitutional. Alternatively, the court may also declare a statute conditionally unconstitutional, meaning that the law is unconstitutional if interpreted in a certain way. These types of decisions are known as "derivative decisions" (변형결정) and are often a point of contention between the Constitutional Court and the Supreme Court. The Supreme Court has argued that such derivative decisions encroach upon the court's traditional role of interpreting statutes and could lead to confusion and inconsistency in the application of the law. On the other hand, the Constitutional Court has justified its use of derivative decisions by stating that they are necessary to ensure that the law conforms to the constitution while respecting the legislative intent and separation of powers. |

=== Impeachment ===
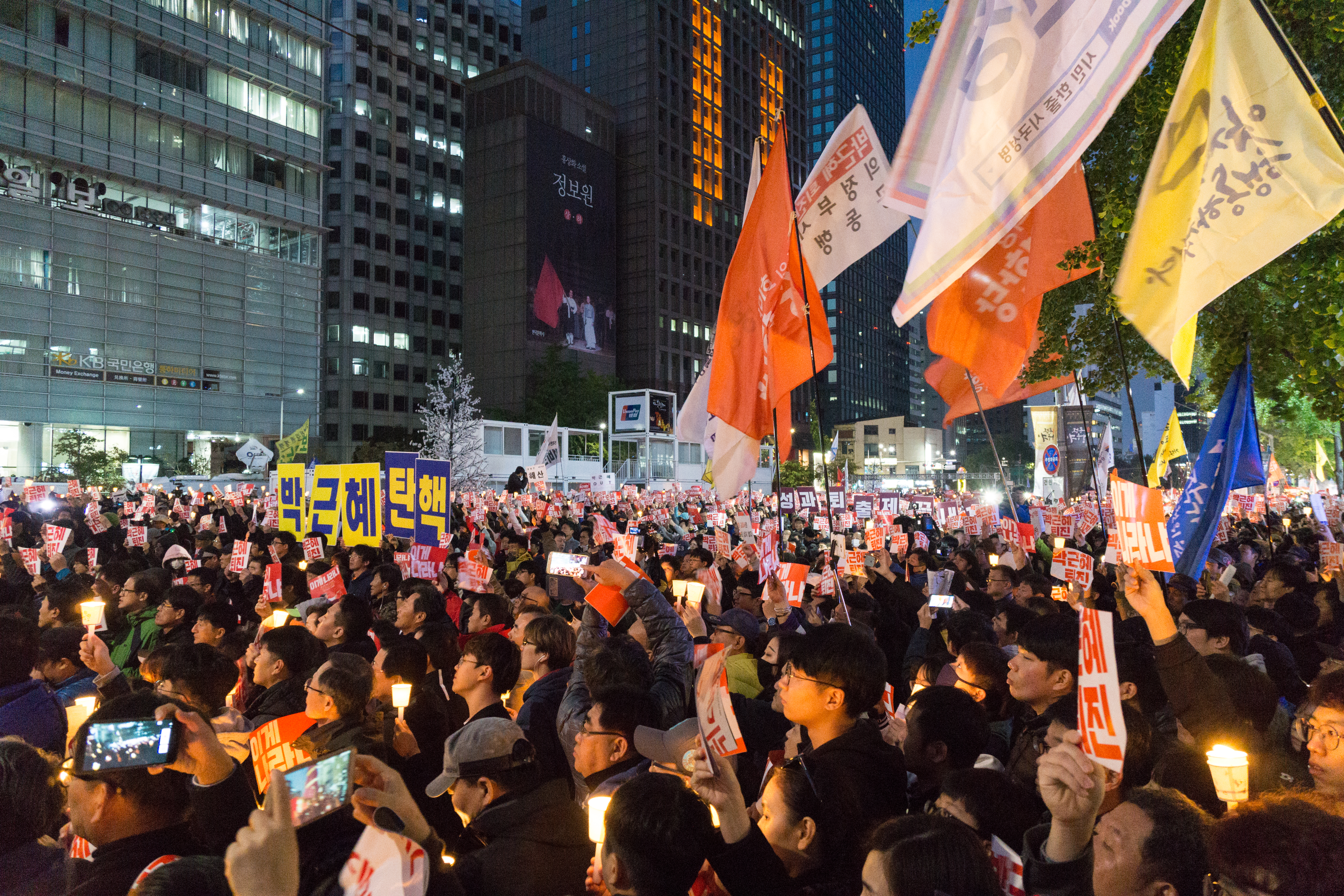
The impeachment of Park Geun-hye (Case No. 2016Hun-Na1) in 2017 is one of the landmark decisions on impeachment.

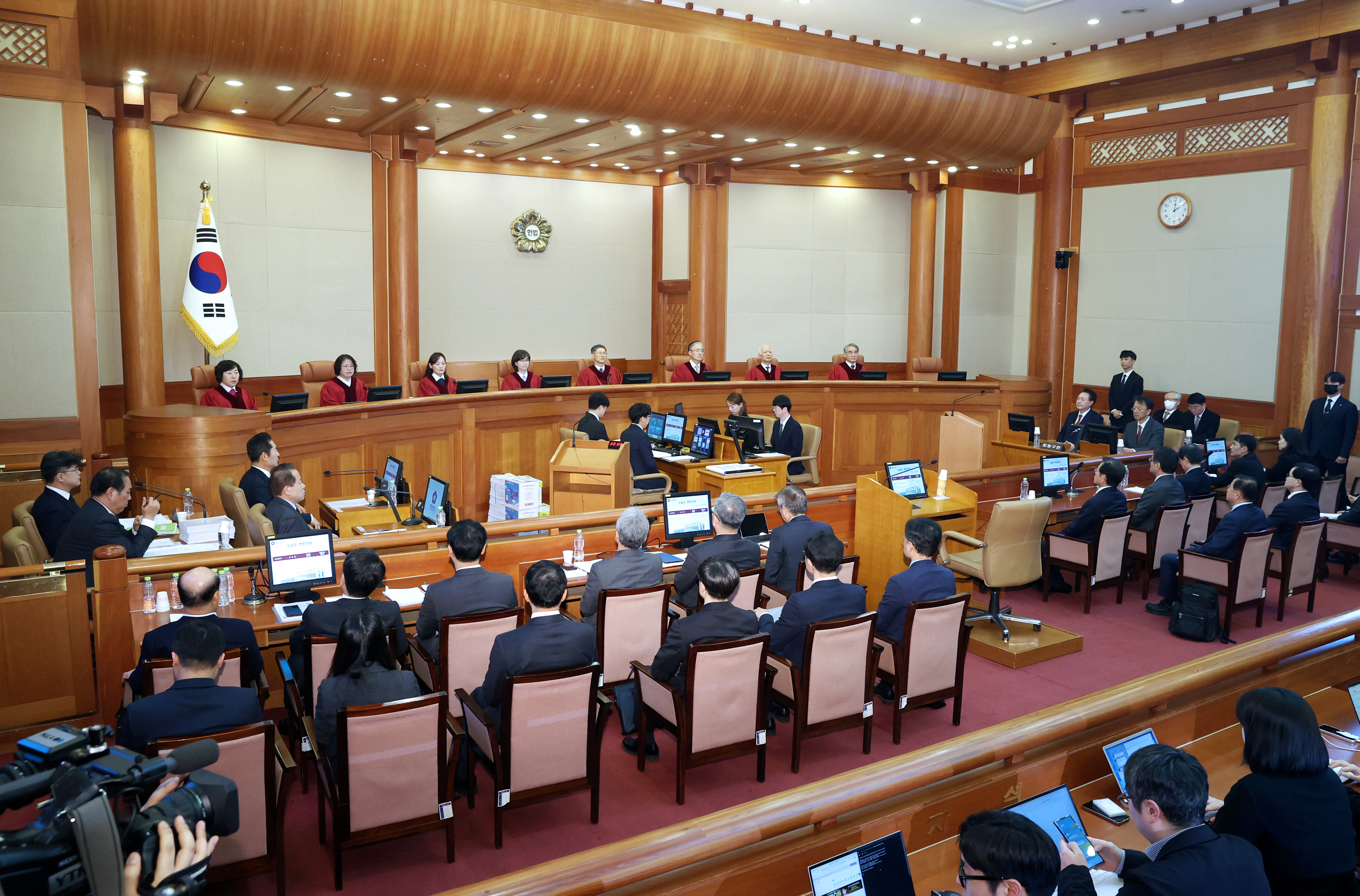
The Constitutional Court holding a hearing in the impeachment trial for President Yoon Suk Yeol, with Yoon in attendance (on the right) as the defendant, January 21, 2025.

Impeachment adjudication (탄핵심판) is another prominent power of the Constitutional Court. According to Article 65 Clause 1 of the constitution, if the president, prime minister, or other state council members violate the constitution or other laws of official duty, the National Assembly can propose an impeachment motion with the concurrence of at least one-third of the National Assembly members, or in the case of the president, of at least a majority. For passage, the motion must receive the support of a two-thirds majority if it concerns the president and a simple majority for any other office. Once the impeachment motion passes the National Assembly, the Constitutional Court adjudicates the impeachment, and until the Constitutional Court renders a decision, the impeached official is suspended from office and unable to exercise power.

Neither the constitution nor the Constitutional Court Act provides concrete criteria to be considered in an impeachment case. Therefore, previous Constitutional Court decisions play an important role in establishing standards of review for impeachment cases. There have been three presidential impeachment cases: the 2004 impeachment of Roh Moo-hyun, the 2017 impeachment of Park Geun-hye, and the 2025 impeachment of Yoon Suk Yeol. In President Roh's impeachment case, the court decided that a grave (중대한) violation of the law is required to remove a president from office. However, in the case of President Park Geun-hye, the Constitutional Court held that a violation of the constitution is sufficient for removal, even without a grave violation of the law or statutes.

=== Notable Presidential Impeachment Cases ===
Article 65 of the 1987 Constitution authorizes the National Assembly to impeach the president, prime minister, and other senior officials for violations of the Constitution or statutory law in the performance of official duties. Once a motion passes, the official is suspended from duty, and the Constitutional Court of Korea determines whether the violation constitutes a grave breach warranting removal. Through these cases, the Court has clarified the constitutional limits of executive power and reinforced the rule of law in Korea’s democracy.

==== Impeachment of President Roh Moo-hyun (2004) ====
On 12 March 2004, the National Assembly passed an impeachment motion with 193 votes in favor, citing alleged violations of political neutrality during a legislative campaign, mismanagement of economic policy, and irregular personnel appointments. Following the vote, Prime Minister Goh Kun assumed the duties of acting president while the Court organized hearings.

In its unanimous decision of 14 May 2004 (case 2004Hun-Na1), the Court dismissed the petition, holding that although Roh’s campaign-related remarks were inappropriate, they did not reach the constitutional threshold for removal. The judgment explained that impeachment is not punitive but preventive, designed to protect the Constitution when misconduct fundamentally threatens constitutional order. The Court distinguished between illegality and gravity, emphasizing that removal requires a violation so severe that continued service becomes incompatible with constitutional government.

==== Impeachment of President Park Geun-hye (2017) ====
On 9 December 2016, the National Assembly voted 234–56 to impeach President Park Geun-hye after evidence revealed that her confidant Choi Soon-sil had influenced official decisions and solicited corporate donations. The Constitutional Court accepted the case (2016Hun-Na1), suspended Park from office, and conducted televised hearings over 92 days.

On 10 March 2017, the Court unanimously upheld the impeachment (8–0), permanently removing Park from office. The Court concluded that Park had violated constitutional duties by allowing a private individual to intervene in state affairs and by failing to uphold the rule of law. Its written judgment stated that these actions “seriously impaired the spirit of representative democracy,” satisfying the gravity test first articulated in 2004.

Scholarly analyses interpret the ruling as consolidating constitutional principles developed in the Roh case. Kim (2018) highlights the Court’s procedural transparency—public hearings, reasoned opinion, and publication of evidence summaries—as key to legitimacy, while Kimura (2020) notes that the case illustrated how mass protest and judicial review can coexist within constitutional bounds. Following the decision, governance indicators recorded higher public confidence in judicial institutions.

==== Standards and Later Developments ====
Once the National Assembly files a petition, the Constitutional Court issues notice to the respondent and convenes a nine-justice bench. Suspension from office is automatic to preserve neutrality. The Court may request evidence, call witnesses, and allow amici briefs from legal experts. Hearings are open to the public and broadcast live, and a decision requires participation by all nine justices; removal demands at least six concurring votes (two-thirds majority).

The Court applies a two-step analysis: (1) whether a legal or constitutional violation occurred, and (2) whether it is grave enough to endanger democratic order. The concept of gravity is defined by the harm caused to constitutional values, not by intent or popularity.

The Court’s reports reiterate that impeachment protects constitutional order rather than punishing individuals. Academic studies describe Korea’s framework as an example of balanced constitutionalism combining judicial independence with democratic oversight.

==== Impeachment of President Yoon Suk Yeol (2025) ====
In December 2024, the National Assembly impeached President Yoon Suk Yeol on allegations of exceeding constitutional authority by declaring emergency powers. The Constitutional Court accepted jurisdiction (case 2024Hun-Na1) and, on 4 April 2025, rendered a unanimous decision upholding the impeachment. The Court held that the president’s actions violated constitutional principles of civilian control and separation of powers. Applying the same gravity test developed in earlier cases, it determined that the breach warranted removal. The 2025 decision reaffirmed procedural transparency and judicial independence in Korea’s constitutional adjudication.

By interpreting “grave violation” consistently, the Court has maintained constitutional continuity and reinforced democratic resilience.

=== Dissolution of political parties ===
Under the constitution, the government may request the Constitutional Court to dissolve a political party if its objectives or activities are deemed to violate the liberal democratic basic order (민주적 기본질서). The party-dissolution provision was influenced by its German equivalent, Party Ban (German: Parteiverbot), designed to prevent events like the rise of the Nazis from recurring. While the provision aims to prevent anti-democratic factions from destabilizing society, it also risks being abused by authoritarian leaders to dissolve political parties that challenge their authority and suppress dissent and free speech. Requiring approval by the Constitutional Court is intended to address such concerns.

The Constitutional Court rarely accepts dissolution petitions, and even less often rules in favor of dissolving a political party. Since the Court's establishment in 1987, the Unified Progressive Party is the only political party dissolved through the provision.

=== Jurisdictional disputes ===
The constitution empowers the Constitutional Court to adjudicate jurisdictional disputes (권한쟁의심판), which is derived from the German Organs Dispute (German: Organstreit). In some instances, two separate agencies may have overlapping jurisdictions, which are defined in the relevant statutes that grant those powers. As a result, it may become necessary to distinctly establish the agency responsible for a particular matter. In some other cases, the existence of jurisdiction itself can be disputed. For example, the central government in Seoul may delegate certain government projects to local governments. Local governments may attempt to dodge the delegation by petitioning the Constitutional Court, claiming they lack the constitutional jurisdiction to undertake such tasks.

The most recent and prominent jurisdictional dispute arose when the National Assembly petitioned the Constitutional Court to determine whether acting president Choi Sang-mok had the authority to withhold the appointment of Ma Eun-hyuk, a candidate recommended by the Assembly. The court ruled that the president did not have constitutional authority to reject the appointment of judicial nominees recommended by the National Assembly.

=== Constitutional complaints ===
Article 111 Clause 1 Provision 5 of the constitution, along with Article 68 Clause 1 of the Constitutional Court Act, grants the court the authority to review whether a petitioner's basic rights have been violated by an action or inaction of a public authority. The specification of the constitutional complaints system was influenced by the German equivalent, Verfassungsbeschwerde. Because constitutional complaints (헌법소원심판) are intended to serve as a last resort, they can only be filed after all other existing legal remedies have been exhausted.

Civil liability lawsuits are adjudicated by ordinary courts and therefore not subject to constitutional complaints. The court's review is limited to determining whether the petitioner's basic rights have been violated in the adjudication process. Claims for damages and compensation fall outside the court's jurisdiction and are therefore dismissed.

According to Article 68 Clause 2 of the Constitutional Court Act, petitioners involved in an ongoing lawsuit can bypass the ordinary court and file a complaint directly with the Constitutional Court, provided that they have sought but were denied a referral for a review of a statute's constitutionality (법령소원심판). Because Clause 2 of the article was historically established to counteract the Park Chung Hee regime's suppression of ordinary courts, curtailing their willingness to grant referrals for constitutional reviews, it does not require that the petitioner exhaust all other legal remedies – only that the ordinary court has denied their request for a referral to the Constitutional Court.

== Statistics ==
Below are the aggregated statistics as of February 9, 2021.

| Type | | Total | Constitutionality of statutes | Impeachment | Dissolution of a political party | Competence dispute | Constitutional complaint | | |
| Type | | Total | Constitutionality of statutes | Impeachment | Dissolution of a political party | Competence dispute | Sub total | §68 I | §68 II |
|---|---|---|---|---|---|---|---|---|---|
| Filed | | 41,615 | 1,008 | 2 | 2 | 115 | 40,488 | 32,074 | 8,414 |
| Settled | | 40,303 | 957 | 2 | 2 | 110 | 39,232 | 31,264 | 7,968 |
| Dismissed by panel | | 24,476 | | | | | 24,476 | 19,915 | 4,561 |
| Decided by full bench | Unconstitutional | 655 | 294 | | | | 361 | 113 | 248 |
| Decided by full bench | Nonconformity | 262 | 82 | | | | 180 | 75 | 105 |
| Decided by full bench | Conditionally unconstitutional | 70 | 18 | | | | 52 | 20 | 32 |
| Decided by full bench | Conditionally constitutional | 28 | 7 | | | | 21 | | 21 |
| Decided by full bench | Constitutional | 2,843 | 359 | | | | 2,484 | 4 | 2,480 |
| Decided by full bench | Upholding | 794 | | 1 | 1 | 19 | 773 | 773 | |
| Decided by full bench | Rejected | 7,998 | | 1 | | 27 | 7,970 | 7,970 | |
| Decided by full bench | Dismissed | 2,115 | 73 | | 1 | 45 | 1,996 | 1,611 | 385 |
| Decided by full bench | Other | 10 | | | | | 10 | 8 | 2 |
| Decided by full bench | Withdrawn | 1,052 | 124 | | | 19 | 909 | 775 | 134 |
| Pending | | 1,312 | 51 | | | 5 | 1,256 | 810 | 446 |

== International relations ==
- Venice Commission : South Korea is a member state of the Venice Commission and sends one of the associate justices in the Constitutional Court to the commission. Substitute members are conventionally designated for the following two positions: deputy secretary-general at the court's Department of Court Administration and vice minister of justice. The current member is Justice Kim Hyungdu.
- Association of Asian Constitutional Courts and Equivalent Institutions : South Korea is a founding member state of the Association of Asian Constitutional Courts and Equivalent Institutions (AACC), and hosts its permanent secretariat. The president of the Constitutional Court represents South Korea on the AACC board.

== Criticism and issues ==
According to Article 113 Clause 1 of the constitution, the Constitutional Court is required to have at least six justices present in order to render a decision; however, the constitution is silent on how to overcome an unmet quorum. Article 6 Clause 4 and Clause 5 of the Constitutional Court Act state that any vacancy must be filled within 30 days but lack an effective enforcement mechanism. This exposes the court to potential political instability or gridlock, particularly in cases of disagreement between the president and the National Assembly. For example, in October 2024, three Constitutional Court justices retired, but the ruling party and the opposition in the National Assembly failed to agree on how to fill the vacancies. This deadlock persisted into December 2024, complicating the impeachment proceedings against President Yoon Suk Yeol and presenting legal and procedural challenges. While the Supreme Court of Korea similarly lacks contingency measures for potential vacancies, the key difference is that a supermajority of six justices is needed to issue a ruling in the Constitutional Court, whereas only a simple majority is needed in the Supreme Court.

=== Relationship with Supreme Court ===
The relationship between the Constitutional Court and the Supreme Court is a widely discussed topic among Korean jurists. The constitution does not establish a clear hierarchy between the two highest courts, and the ranks of the respective chief justices are equal under the Constitutional Court Act. Since the co-equal relationship of the courts relies on a piece of legislation, the National Assembly could pass an amendment ranking the heads of the courts differently and resolve this issue. However, there currently is no legal resolution for disagreements between the two highest courts.

Points of contention include jurisdiction over executive orders and presidential decrees, and "unconstitutional as applied" decisions.

While Article 107 of the constitution states that "the Supreme Court shall have the power to make a final review of the constitutionality or legality of administrative decrees, regulations or actions," Article 111 of the constitution and the Constitutional Court Act together also grant the Constitutional Court overlapping jurisdiction to rule on constitutionality of government actions.

Moreover, the highest courts disagree heavily on the Constitutional Court's power to declare a law unconstitutional as applied (한정위헌결정) – a decision stating that the law itself is constitutional but applied unconstitutionally. The Supreme Court interprets such rulings as upholding the law's constitutionality and does not consider the decisions binding, allowing itself to disregard these rulings and proceed unhindered.

In response, according to the Constitutional Court Act, the Constitutional Court has the power to suspend "state powers" that may violate the constitution. The Constitutional Court interprets such "state powers" to include Supreme Court decisions. The Constitutional Court overturned one Supreme Court decision in 1997 and two more in 2022.

Because there is no higher authority to resolve disputes between them, these conflicts lack legal recourse.

== Symbols ==
Emblem of the Constitutional Court of Korea (1988–2017)

Flag of the Constitutional Court of Korea (1988–2017)

Flag of the Constitutional Court of Korea (from 2017)

Logo of the Constitutional Court of Korea (from 2009)

== See also ==
- Constitution of South Korea
- Politics of South Korea
- Government of South Korea
- Judiciary of South Korea
- President of the Constitutional Court of Korea
- Rapporteur Judge
- Supreme Court of Korea
- Venice Commission
- Association of Asian Constitutional Courts and Equivalent Institutions
