= Lee Suk-tae =

S.Korean Constitutional Court Justice from 2018

- 이석태
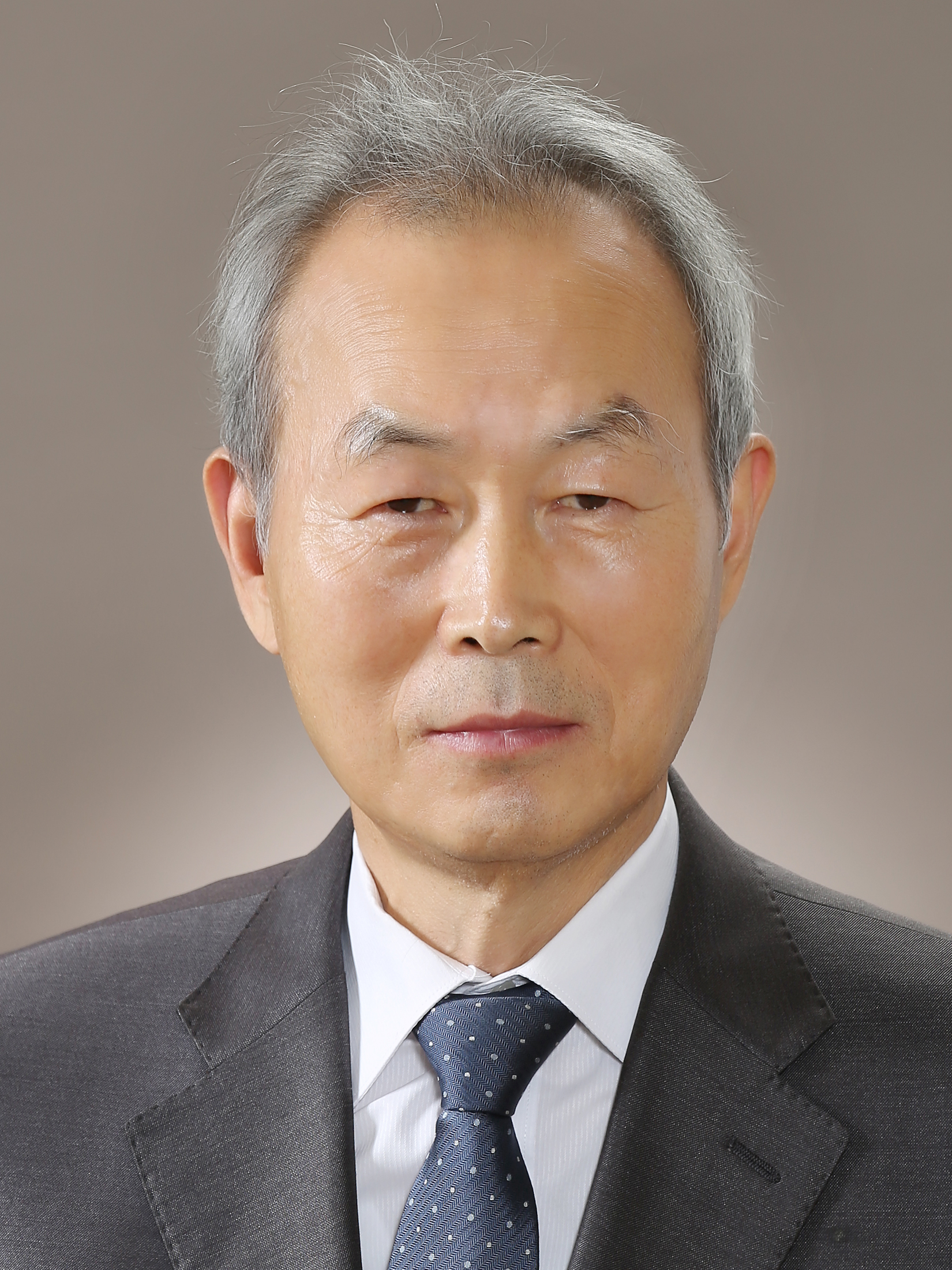

Justice of the Constitutional Court of Korea
- In office September 2018 – April 2023
- Nominated by: Kim Myeong-soo
- Appointed by: Moon Jae-in
- Preceded by: Kim Chang-jong
- Succeeded by: Jung Jungmi

Member of Venice Commission (representing South Korea)
- Incumbent
- Assumed office February 2019
- Preceded by: Kang Il-won

Personal details
- Born: 17 April 1953 (age 73)
- Education: Seoul National University (LL.B.)

Korean name
- Hangul: 이석태
- Hanja: 李錫兌
- RR: I Seoktae
- MR: I Sŏkt'ae

Lee Suk-tae is a former Justice of the Constitutional Court of Korea, nominated by Supreme Court chief Kim Myeong-soo and appointed by President Moon Jae-in in the year 2018. He is also a member of Venice Commission representing South Korea, from 2019. He is regarded as liberal, left-wing group among nine Justices of the Constitutional Court. He is also a South Korean cause lawyer who fought for human rights.

== Early life ==
Born in Seosan, South Chungcheong Province, in 1953 during the Korean War, he graduated from Kyungbuk Middle School and Kyungbock High School in Seoul. He entered Seoul National University in 1972 and studied chemistry until his third year, but dropped out because of his passion for the humanities. He later returned to the university's humanities department. He chose the humanities because he wanted to study literature or philosophy, but after three years of military service, he became frustrated and abandoned those studies in favor of law. He passed the 24th Bar Examination in 1982 and completed training at the Judicial Research and Training Institute in order to become a human rights lawyer. In 1997, he translated and introduced a book by Helen Nearing.

As a lawyer, he mainly handled major cases, including the Kang Ki-hoon will forgery case, the constitutional petition regarding the non-marriage of same-sex family members, and the constitutional petition concerning prisoners on trial wearing prison uniforms. He also obtained the first ruling in South Korea imposing liability on the U.S. military for environmental pollution related to noise from a military shooting range in Mae Hyang Ri. He served as a permanent member of the executive committee of the Korean Federation of Environmental Movements.

He later served as co-representative of the Green Transportation Movement and chairman of the Human Rights Committee of the Korean Bar Association. After the administration of President Roh Moo-hyun took office, he served as the first presidential secretary for civil service discipline. He led the campaign to abolish the head-of-household system and participated in the conscientious objection movement against military service. Since 2011, he has served as co-representative of the People’s Solidarity for Participatory Democracy. In January 2015, he was appointed chairman of the Special Investigation Committee into the Sewol ferry disaster, which resulted from the sinking of the Sewol ferry on April 16, 2014.

As a human rights lawyer, he was nominated as a justice of the Constitutional Court. He was appointed to the Constitutional Court by President Moon Jae-in on September 21 of that year. He retired on April 16, 2023, at the age of 70, and held a pre-retirement ceremony on April 14.

== Career ==
Following list is summary of Lee Suk-tae's career.

- 1985 Lawyer, Lee Suk-tae Law Offices
- 1989 Lawyer, Duksu Joint Notarization and Law Offices
- 1997 Lawyer, Duksu Joint Law Offices
- 2000 Lawyer, Duksu Law Offices / Chairman, Human Rights Affairs Committee of Korean Bar Association
- 2003 Secretary to the President for Public Offense Disciplines, Office of the President for Civil Service Discipline
- 2004 President, MINBYUN-Lawyers for a Democratic Society
- 2007 Non-executive Director, Korea Democracy Foundation
- 2008 Co-president, Civil Peace Forum
- 2011 Co-president People's Solidarity for Participatory democracy.
- 2015 Chairman, Special Investigation Commission for 4. 16 Sewol Ferry Disaster
- 2017 Co-president, Truth and Justice Forum
- 2018 President, Public Interest & Human Rights Litigation Center of MINBYUN-Lawyers for a Democratic Society
- 2018 Justice of the Constitutional Court of Korea (Since 21 September 2018)

Legal offices
Preceded by Kim Chang-jong	Justice of the Constitutional Court of Korea; 2018–2023	Succeeded by Jung Jungmi
