= Law schools in South Korea =

Traditionally, Korean legal education followed the German and Japanese models. Recent reforms are shifting professional education from an undergraduate LL.B. to a postgraduate J.D. type of education. In addition, many Korean universities continue to offer legal education in academic and scholastic frameworks, offering graduate degrees, including Ph.D.s in Law. Further, several universities focus on legal systems outside of Korea, such as on Common Law.

== Admission and Law School Ranking ==
Since the implementation of the 2007 Act calling for reform in legal education, law schools in Korea became graduate schools (similar to the US system) and require a bachelor's degree, a satisfactory undergraduate grade point average, foreign language proficiency, and a satisfactory score on the Legal Education Eligibility Test (LEET) to be considered for admission (the LEET is modelled after Law School Admission Test (LSAT) in the US). Additional factors are evaluated through essays, interviews, the school administered essay exams, and other application materials.

2012–2020 Top 10 Law School Ranking from Hankyung Business Magazine was:

1. Seoul National University School of Law
2. Korea University School of Law
3. Yonsei Law School
4. Sungkyunkwan University Law School
5. Hanyang University School of Law
6. Sogang Law School
7. Ewha Law School
8. Pusan National University School of Law
9. Kyung hee University Law School
10. Chung-ang University Law School

There are 15 remaining law schools in the rankings below.

== Law School System in Transition ==
In South Korea, a law school was an undergraduate institution where students major in law and are awarded a Légum Baccalaureus, or LL.B. (Bachelor of Laws). Following graduation, candidates must take and pass the bar exam. Under the present judiciary exam (as of 2008), the number of new lawyers admitted each year was limited to 1,000. Successful candidates must then complete the mandatory 2 years of training courses at the Judicial Research & Training Institute (JRTI) in order to join the bar in Korea. The JRTI is managed by the Supreme Court.

However, as a result of a bill passed in July 2007, the education system for legal studies will soon undergo significant changes. The 2007 Act calls for the adoption of a separate law school system similar to that of the United States, with the new graduate-level law schools expected to open by 2009. Only a limited number of universities will be permitted to establish such graduate-level law schools, as determined by the relevant government agency after its review of each university's submitted materials. In February 2008, the Education Ministry released a final selection of 25 universities approved for the new graduate-level law schools (15 in the Seoul metropolitan area and 10 in the provinces). The selection process itself has not been without controversy; upon release of the final list, some of the excluded universities threatened to sue for an injunction or stage protest rallies, and one university president threatened to resign.

Under the new system, those who have bachelor's degrees can apply for law schools which have three-year programs and the graduates can then take the bar exam; those who achieve a certain score (or above) will be licensed. In addition, based on an October 2007 revised plan submitted by Ministry of Education and Human Resources Development, the law school admission is limited to 2,000 candidates.

The bar passage rate in South Korea is around 50%, yet declining rapidly due to restraints on the number of lawyers admitted to the bar association. Only approximately 1500 people can be admitted to the Bar annually. More and more students who already graduated law school are retaking the Bar exam, which may cause issues with law school system in Korea.

== Republic of Korea Law Schools ==
Universities with their government approved annual enrollment of students:

In February 2008, the Ministry of Education released a final selection of 25 universities approved for the new graduate-level (J.D.-style) law schools. Total enrollment in all law schools is limited to 2,000 students per year.

- Law school with government approved annual enrollment of 150 students
  - Seoul National University Law School
- Law schools with government approved annual enrollment of 120 students
  - Chonnam National University Law School
  - Korea University Law School
  - Kyungpook National University Law School
  - Pusan National University Law School
  - Sungkyunkwan University Law School
  - Yonsei University Law School
- Law schools with government approved annual enrollment of 100 students
  - Chungnam National University Law School
  - Hanyang University Law School Law School
  - Ewha Woman's University Law School
- Law schools with government approved annual enrollment of 80 students
  - Chonbuk National University Law School
  - Dong-A University Law School
- Law schools with government approved annual enrollment of 70 students
  - Chungbuk National University Law School
  - Yeungnam University Law School
- Law schools with government approved annual enrollment of 60 students
  - Kyunghee University Law School
  - Wonkwang University Law School
- Law schools with government approved annual enrollment of 50 students
  - University of Seoul Law School
  - Hankuk University of Foreign Studies Law School
  - Ajou University Law School
  - Chung-Ang University Law School
  - Inha University Law School
- Law schools with government approved annual enrollment of 40 students
  - Kangwon National University Law School
  - Jeju National University Law School
  - Sogang University Law School
  - Konkuk University Law School

=== Law School enrollment by area ===
- Law Schools in Seoul area (total enrollment 1020)

Seoul National (150) // Korea / Yonsei / Sungkyunkwan (120) // Hanyang / Ewha (100) // Kyunghee (60) // Seoul City / Choong-ang / HUFS / Kunkuk / Sogang (40).

- Law Schools outside of Seoul area (total enrollment 980)

Pusan National / Kyungpook National / Chonnam National (120) // Chungnam National (100) // Chunbuk National / Donga (80) // Chungbook National / Youngnam (70) // Wonkwang (60) // Ajou / Inha / Kangwon / Jeju (40).

== Common Law Education ==
Several universities have added undergraduate or postgraduate programs in Common Law. Those schools not only teach common law, but also teach most or all of their classes in English. Handong Global University offers a three-year postgraduate degree that parallels an A.B.A.-style J.D. educational program. Soongsil University offers an undergraduate LL.B. that parallels common law educations in English-speaking countries. Both schools have strong moot court teams that compete internationally.

== See also ==
- Legal Education Eligibility Test
- Test of Legal Ethics
