= Cho Hee-dae =

17th Chief Justice of Supreme Court of South Korea

The Honourable Cho Hee-dae
- 조희대
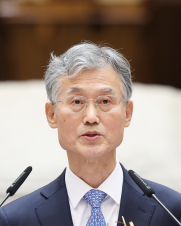
- Cho on his inauguration day in 2023

17th Chief Justice of the Supreme Court of Korea
- Incumbent
- Assumed office 8 December 2023
- Appointed by: Yoon Suk Yeol
- Preceded by: Kim Myeong-su

Associate Justice of the Supreme Court of Korea
- In office 4 March 2014 – 3 March 2020
- Nominated by: Yang Sung-tae
- Appointed by: Park Geun-hye

Personal details
- Born: 6 June 1957 (age 69) Gyeongju, South Korea
- Education: Seoul National University (LLB); Cornell University (LLM)
- Occupation: Jurist

Military service
- Allegiance: South Korea
- Branch/service: Republic of Korea Army
- Years of service: 1983–1986
- Rank: First lieutenant (Judge advocate)

Korean name
- Hangul: 조희대
- Hanja: 曺喜大
- RR: Jo Huidae
- MR: Cho Hŭidae

Cho Hee-dae (Korean: 조희대; also written "Jo Hee-de"; born 6 June 1957) is a South Korean judge who has served as the 17th Chief Justice of the Supreme Court of Korea since his appointment by President Yoon Suk Yeol in December 2023. He was responsible for reading the controversial verdict on overturning of acquittal judgement of Lee Jae-myung regarding the violation of Public Official Election Act on 1 May 2025.

== Life and career ==
Cho Hee-dae was born on 6 June 1957 in Gyeongju, South Korea. He graduated from Kyeongbuk High School and Seoul National University School of Law, and started his legal career as trial court judge in 1986. After almost thirty years of serving in South Korean ordinary courts as judge, he got promoted to associate justice of the Supreme Court of Korea, by nomination of 15th Chief Justice Yang Sung-tae and appointment from President Park Geun-hye in 2014. During his term as associate justice, he was well known for his conservative views, including making dissenting opinions arguing that Heather Cho should be punished for changing flight course in the nut rage incident, or making another dissenting opinions over case on whether to punish conscientious objector, supporting those objectors should be punished under conscription law of that time. After 6 years of term as associate justice in South Korean Supreme Court, Cho Hee-dae turned his eye to academia and began academic career as endowed chair professor at Sungkyunkwan University Law School from 2020.

Around the retirement of 16th Chief Justice Kim Myeong-su in September 2023, he was not President Yoon Suk Yeol's primary choice for next chief justice candidate. However, in October, when President Yoon's close friend judge Lee Gyun-ryong failed to be confirmed by the National Assembly due to his strongly conservative views and problems around family assets, the President had to look for candidates that can also satisfy Democratic Party of Korea, which held a majority in the National Assembly. Known as a moderately-conservative judge, Cho had a favourable public image because he did not serve as a private attorney after retiring from Supreme Court associate justice, which made him free from problems of jeongwan yeu, a somewhat common problem in South Korean judiciary that retired high level government lawyers using their former public career and network to pursue their own secular interests. This non-secular career of Jo as law professor after Supreme Court associate justice, led President Yoon to nominate him as candidate for 17th Chief Justice in November 2023.

On 8 December 2023, as Cho Hee-dae had no problems of personal issues including jeongwan yeu, his nomination was approved by a 264-18 vote in the National Assembly. Upon congressional confirmation, and President Yoon appointed Cho as 17th Chief Justice of the Supreme Court of Korea. On 17 September 2025, he completely denied allegations that he had a meeting with outsiders before ruling on President Lee Jae-myung's alleged violation of the election law. On October 15 2025, he attended the National Assembly audit of the International Committee on Legal Justice. On December 9, 2025, he was booked by the Corruption Investigation Office for High-ranking Officials.

== See also ==
- Supreme Court of Korea
- Chief Justice of the Supreme Court of Korea

== References and notes ==
Legal offices
Preceded by Kim Myeong-su	Chief Justice of the Supreme Court of Korea; 2023–present	Incumbent
