= Lee Yong-hun =

Former Chief Justice of South Korean Supreme Court

Lee Yong-hoon
- 이용훈
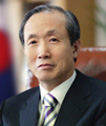

14th Chief Justice of the Supreme Court of Korea
- In office 25 September 2005 – 24 September 2011
- Nominated by: Roh Moo-hyun
- Preceded by: Choi Jong-young
- Succeeded by: Yang Sung-tae

Personal details
- Born: 7 February 1942 (age 84) Boseong County, South Jeolla Province, Japanese Korea
- Education: Seoul National University

Korean name
- Hangul: 이용훈
- Hanja: 李容勳
- RR: I Yonghun
- MR: I Yonghun

Lee Yong-hoon (Korean: 이용훈; born 7 February 1942) is a South Korean jurist who formerly served as the Chief Justice of the Supreme Court of South Korea.

== Early life ==
Lee was born in Jeollanam-do. He attended High School #1 in Gwangju before going on to Seoul National University's faculty of law.

== Career ==
Prior to his appointment as Chief Justice, Lee served as a Seoul High Court judge, Supreme Court justice, and chairman of the Government Employees Ethics Committee. During his confirmation hearings, he was questioned about high legal fees he had earned—roughly six billion won on 400 cases in five years in private practise, with legislators implying that he had received special treatment from sitting judges—as well as about his purchase of a 66 pyeong (220 m^{2}) apartment in Seoul's exclusive Seocho-dong neighbourhood.

Following his retirement from the bench, he started a movement to recognise Article 9 of the Japanese Constitution by awarding it the Nobel Peace Prize.
