= Kangwon National University School of Law =

School of Law in South Korea

- Type: Public
- Established: 2009
- Dean: Park Kyeong-Cheol (박경철)
- Administrative staff: 30 (as of Summer 2021)
- Students: 120 JD
- Location: Chuncheon, Gangwon Province, South Korea
- Campus: Urban
- Website: law.kangwon.ac.kr

Kangwon National University School of Law (Korean: 강원대학교 법학전문대학원, also known as KNU Law School 강원법대 로스쿨 or KangLaw 강로) is one of the professional graduate schools of Kangwon National University (KNU). Located in Chuncheon, South Korea, it is one of the 25 government approved law schools. It specializes in environmental law and offers scholarship to all eligible students.

== History ==
Kangwon National University (KNU) was established in June 1946. In 1970, the Law Department was established, as the College of Law and Management. The College of Law became independent in 1980. The first Bachelor of Laws, Master of Laws, and Juris Doctor courses were established in 1970, 1979, and 1981, respectively.

In 1989, the College of Law was separated from the Department of Public Law and Civil Law. In 1996, the two departments were forced to unify, creating the universal Division of Law. In 2002, the Graduate School of Judicial Affairs (법무전문대학원) was opened, as a model for the early-stage Korean legal system reforms of the Kim Dae-jung administration. It was the only one of its kind in South Korea. 2005 saw the completion of the KNU Law main building. The last students for the College of Law entered in 2008. The College of Law was abolished in favour of KNU Law School, which saw its first class in March 2009.

== Organizations and forums ==
=== Institute of Comparative Legal Studies ===
Founded in 1985, the Institute of Comparative Legal Studies (비교법학연구소) develops its own legal contents, cases, professional studies, and materials. It has a legal clinic, introduced in 2009, to provide consulting for legal matters for the people of Gangwon. Twice a year, they publish the Kangwon Law Review (강원법학). They also hold a professional scholarly symposium.

=== Global Law & Society Forum ===
Founded on March 6, 2009, the goals of the Global Law & Society Forum are to discuss global perspectives on controversial legal and social matters, while also building foreign language skills (mainly English).

== Exchanges ==
KNU Law has exchange agreements with Kiel University in Germany, Kyushu University and Hokkaido University in Japan, Slippery Rock University of Pennsylvania in the United States, and the CUHK Faculty of Law in Hong Kong. It is also part of MOU agreements, including with Lewis & Clark Law School (in July 2011).

== See also ==
- Law school in South Korea
- Legal Education Eligibility Test
