= Jung Jungmi =

South Korean judge (born 1969)

- 정정미
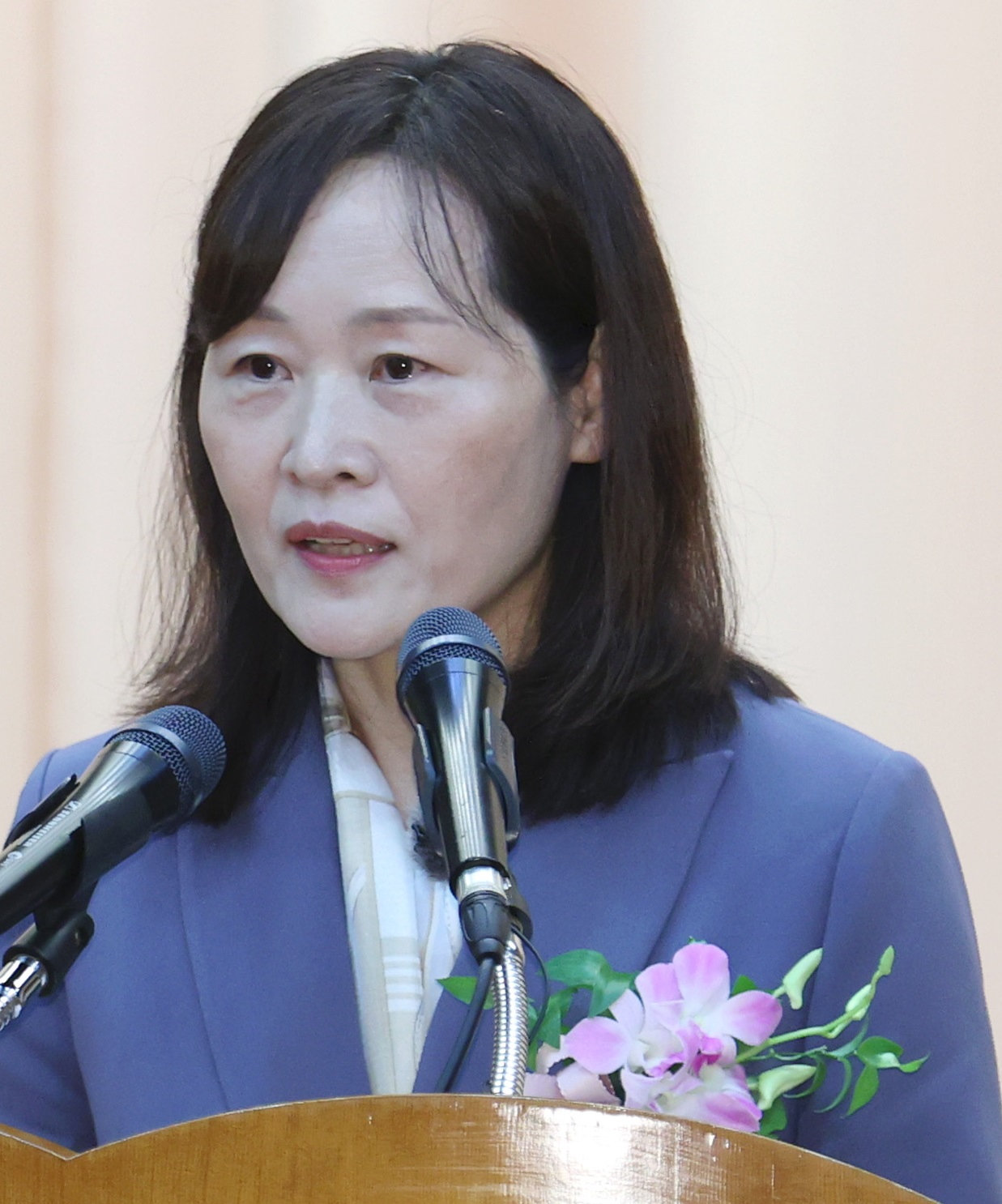

Justice of the Constitutional Court of Korea
- Incumbent
- Assumed office 17 April 2023
- Nominated by: Kim Myeong-su
- Appointed by: Yoon Suk Yeol
- Preceded by: Lee Suk-tae

Personal details
- Born: 24 May 1969 (age 57) Busan, South Korea
- Spouse: Kim Byeong-sik (m. 1997)
- Children: 3
- Education: Seoul National University (LLB)

Korean name
- Hangul: 정정미
- Hanja: 鄭貞美
- RR: Jeong Jeongmi
- MR: Chŏng Chŏngmi

Jung Jungmi (Korean: 정정미; born May 24, 1969) is a South Korean jurist who serves as a justice of the Constitutional Court of Korea. She was nominated by Supreme Court Chief Justice Kim Myeong-su on March 6, 2023, and officially appointed to the court by national President Yoon Suk Yeol on April 17, 2023. She is the sixth woman to serve on the Constitutional Court.

Jung was born and raised in Busan. After graduating from the Seoul National University College of Law and 25th class of the Judicial Research and Training Institute, she began her career as a judge for the Bucheon Branch of the Incheon District Court in 1996. For the next 27 years, she served as a judge for courts in the areas of Seoul, South Chungcheong, Daejeon, and Jeonju. In 2023, she was nominated and appointed to the Constitutional Court as a replacement for Justice Lee Suk-tae. During her tenure on the court, she has been classified as moderate judge.

== Early life and education ==
Jung was born on May 24, 1969, in Busan, the third of five children that included two brothers and two sisters. Jung's parents were originally from Hadong, South Gyeongsang Province and had moved to Busan prior to Jung's birth. In reflecting on her childhood, Jung described her parents as poor but hardworking and recalled how her mother, who was a devout Buddhist, would tell her to "become a Buddha who saves all people." During Jung's second year of middle school, Jung's parents struggled financially and had to make a living as street vendors selling flowers in Nampo-dong, Busan.

Jung attended Namseong Girls' High School, a private school in Jung-gu, Busan, where she graduated in 1988. Jung then attended the Seoul National University College of Law, graduating in 1993. Jung passed the 35th bar examination in the same year and graduated from the 25th class of the Judicial Research and Training Institute in 1996.

== Early legal career ==
Upon graduation from the Judicial Research and Training Institute, Jung was hired as a judge for the Bucheon Branch of the Incheon District Court. After two years at the Incheon District Court, Jung was transferred to the Northern Branch of the Seoul District Court in 1998. In 2000, Jung joined the Gunsan Branch of the Jeonju District Court. Starting in 2004, Jung began serving as a judge for courts through Daejeon and Chungnam, including the Daejeon District Court and Daejeon High Court. From 2009 to 2011, Jung also served as a professor at the Judicial Research and Training Institute. In 2011, Jung was promoted to chief judge at the Daejeon District Court and served from 2014 to 2016 as head of the Gongju Branch. During Jung's tenure, Jung was twice evaluated as an outstanding judge in 2013 and 2019 by the Daejeon Bar Association. In 2019, Jung was promoted to the Daejeon High Court.

In 2022, Jung presided over an appeal trial involving the sexual assault and murder of a 20-month old infant that received significant public attention. On June 15, 2021, Yang Jeong-sik was accused of abusing his 20-month old stepdaughter by sexually assaulting her, beating her, twisting her arm, and throwing her against a wall. After she died from the abuse, he hid her body in an icebox for twenty days. When the girl's grandmother reported Yang to the police, Yang fled and was arrested four days later at a motel in Dong District, Daejeon. While Yang was initially convicted and sentenced to 30 years in prison, the prosecution appealed the sentencing decision to the Daejeon High Court and requested the court impose the death penalty. During the course of the trial and appeal proceedings, more than 900 petitions and complaints were sent to the courts demanding severe punishment for Yang. After conducting an appeal trial, a panel of the Daejeon High Court led by Jung increased Yang's sentence to life in prison. In making the court's ruling, Jung stated "it is very necessary to clearly state the principle that those who harm the life of an innocent child will definitely pay a price appropriate to their crime, and to prevent such crimes from happening again."

== Constitutional Court of South Korea (2023–present) ==
=== Nomination ===
In January 2023, the South Korea Supreme Court formed a Constitutional Court Justice Candidate Recommendation Committee to recommend replacements for Justice Lee Seon-ae, whose term of office ended March 2023, and Justice Lee Suk-tae, whose term of office ended April 2023. On February 28, 2023, Jung was one of the eight candidates recommended by the committee, a list which also included Chief Judges Kim Hyungdu and Kim In-gyeom of the Seoul High Court, Chief Judge Kim Heung-jun of the Busan High Court, Chief Judge Kim Yong-seok of the Patent Court, Chief Judge Son Bong-gi of the Daegu District Court, Chief Judge Noh Gyeong-pil of the Suwon High Court, and Ha Myeong-ho, a professor at Korea University Law School.

On March 6, 2023, Supreme Court Chief Justice Kim Myeong-su nominated Jung as the replacement for Justice Lee Suk-tae. At the time of Jung's nomination, conservatives had expressed concern that Chief Justice Kim would choose progressive nominees and give progressives a six-seat majority on the nine-member Constitutional Court where six votes is required for constitutional review. Of the incumbent Constitutional Court justices, four including Justices Yoo Nam-seok, Moon Hyungbae, Kim Kiyoung, and Lee Mison were members of progressive research organizations. And of the eight candidates recommended for nomination by Chief Justice Kim, both Chief Judge Kim Heung-jun and Professor Ha Myeong-ho had ties to progressive research organizations. Jung's nomination reportedly alleviated these concerns as Jung was considered a moderate judge. Jung's nomination also kept the ratio of men to women on the court at 6–3.

On March 29, 2023, the National Assembly's Legislation and Judiciary Committee held a hearing on Jung's nomination. During the hearing, members of both the Democratic Party and People Power Party questioned Jung on whether the government's third-party compensation proposal for victims of Japanese forced labor violated the Supreme Court's compensation ruling. In declining to criticize the proposal, Jung stated "the Supreme Court ruling declared the debtor's responsibility, and I think that the actual process of receiving the money and realizing the payment could be separate areas." When questioned on the Constitutional Court's recent limitations on prosecutors' investigative powers, Jung stated she respects the ruling and claimed criticism that the court's ruling was politically motivated was inappropriate. Jung also expressed support for requiring face-to-face hearings for the issuance of search-and-seizure warrants.

In response to questions about anti-discrimination laws, Jung stated "sexual minorities are not a matter of right or wrong, but a matter of an individual's sexual orientation, and should be respected as a private matter" while also noting "in the process of enacting the law, a process of broadening the scope of understanding, resolving misunderstandings, and forming social consensus should come first." Jung also faced controversy over acquiring farmland in Cheongdo County, Gyeonsangbuk-do in 2013. While Jung was serving on the Daejeon District Court as a chief judge, Jung reportedly submitted an agricultural management plan to local authorities that claimed Jung would be farming the property with her own labor. When questioned about the property at the hearing, Jung stated "there was no intention of gaining illicit profits" and claimed the farm was purchased by her parents under her name.

While the National Assembly's approval was not required for Jung's appointment, the Legislative and Judiciary Committee adopted a report on March 30, 2023, that found Jung was sufficiently qualified for appointment to the Constitutional Court. On April 17, 2023, Jung received an official letter of appointment to the court from President Yoon Suk Yeol.

=== Tenure ===
During her tenure on the court, Jung has generally been rated as a moderate and orthodox jurist. But while some news outlets have classified her a moderate conservative, others have pointed to some of her recent rulings to suggest she is a moderate that leans progressive.

==== Impeachment rulings ====
Within months of joining the court, Jung joined a unanimous majority in dismissing the National Assembly's impeachment of Lee Sang-min, the Minister of the Interior and Safety. While the National Assembly had sought to hold Lee responsible for the 2022 Seoul Halloween crowd crush, the Constitutional Court held Lee "did not commit a serious violation of the Constitution or the law." In a separate opinion, Jung noted that while Lee's post-disaster remarks violated the duty to maintain dignity as a civil servant, the violation was not severe enough to justify Lee's removal from office.

On May 30, 2024, Jung joined Justices Kim Kiyoung, Moon Hyungbae, and Lee Mison in dissenting from the Constitutional Court's decision to dismiss the impeachment of Ahn Dong-wan, a deputy chief prosecutor from the Busan District Prosecutors' Office. The National Assembly had initially impeached Ahn for the retaliatory prosecution of a Seoul city official. Although five of the court's nine justices agreed to dismiss the impeachment, they were divided on their reasoning with three justices arguing there was no abuse of power while two justices argued any violation was not sufficiently serious to justify dismissal. Jung and the other dissenting justices disagreed, stating Ahn not only abused the right to prosecute but that such abuse sufficiently serious to support removal from office. They stated "the benefit of protecting the Constitution that can be gained by dismissing Prosecutor Ahn is so great that it overwhelms the national loss that would result from dismissing him, so Prosecutor Ahn must be dismissed from his position."

==== North Korea leaflet ban ====
On September 26, 2023, Jung was part of a 7–2 majority on the Constitutional Court that found a criminal ban on citizen-run leaflet campaigns in North Korea was an unconstitutional restriction on free speech and violated the prohibition of excessive punishments.

==== Political Parties Act ====
On September 26, 2023, the Constitutional Court addressed whether a ban on the establishment of regional political parties in the Political Parties Act was an unconstitutional restriction. While a majority of five justices, including Jung, determined the law was unconstitutional because it created "a risk of blocking grassroots democracy by excluding the emergence of political parties that can actively reflect political will on regional issues," they fell short of the minimum six votes required to overturn the law as unconstitutional.

==== Military issues ====
On October 26, 2023, the Constitutional Court addressed whether a provision of the Military Criminal Act that criminalized anal sex was unconstitutional. While this was the fourth time the provision's constitutionality was challenged, a 5–4 majority held the provision was constitutional while Jung joined Justices Kim Kiyoung, Moon Hyungbae, and Lee Mison in dissenting.

On May 30, 2024, Jung joined a 5–4 majority that held an alternative service system for conscientious objectors was constitutional. While the 36-month period for alternative, non-military service was greater than the period required for active military service under South Korea's mandatory conscription system, the majority held it was appropriate to remove the incentive for avoiding military service.

==== MV Sewol ferry disaster response ====
On June 2, 2024, the Constitutional Court dismissed two petitions that argued the government's relief measures in response to the sinking of MV Sewol in 2014 were inadequate and a violation of their fundamental rights. In a 5–4 decision, the court determined the action was untimely because the alleged infringement had already occurred. While the court had the authority to hear the case if there was an "exceptional interest in requesting trial" which included the protection of constitutional order or when there was a risk of infringement recurring, the court determined the issues had already been addressed in prior litigation and that "it is difficult to recognize the exceptional interest in requesting trial in this case due to the need for constitutional explanation." Jung joined Justices Kim Kiyoung, Moon Hyungbae, and Lee Mison in dissenting, arguing "in a situation where the people's right to life is threatened by a large-scale maritime accident similar to a disaster such as the Sewol ferry disaster, the issue of the state's fulfillment of its duty to protect basic rights is likely to recur." They also argued prior court rulings on the disaster did not address the issues presented by the constitutional petition.

==== Environment ====
On August 29, 2024, Jung joined a unanimous majority of the Constitutional Court in ruling the Carbon Neutrality Framework Act's failure to set a greenhouse gas emissions reduction target after 2031 was unconstitutional because it failed to protect basic rights. While Jung joined four justices in also finding the Act's emissions reduction targets for 2030 to be inadequate and unconstitutional, they lacked the six votes required to overturn this portion of the Act.

== Personal life ==
In 1997, Jung married Kim Byeong-sik, a fellow trainee at the Judicial Research and Training Institute who was later hired as a judge for the Seoul District Court in 1999. Together, they have three daughters.

== See also ==
- List of justices of the Constitutional Court of Korea

Legal offices
Preceded by Lee Suk-tae	Justice of the Constitutional Court of Korea; 2023–present	Incumbent
