= Yun Kwan (judge) =

South Korean lawyer and judge (1935–2022)

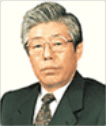

Chief Justice of the Supreme Court of Korea
- In office 27 September 1993 – 22 September 1999
- Preceded by: Choi Jae-ho (acting); Kim Deok-ju
- Succeeded by: Choi Jong-young

Personal details
- Born: 1 April 1935 Haenam County, Japanese Korea
- Died: 14 November 2022 (aged 87)
- Party: Independent
- Education: Yonsei University
- Occupation: Lawyer; Judge

Yun Kwan (Korean: 윤관; 1 April 1935 – 14 November 2022) was a South Korean lawyer and judge. He served as Chief Justice of the Supreme Court of Korea from 1993 to 1999.

Yun died on 14 November 2022, at the age of 87.
