= February 28 Democracy Movement =

The February 28 Democracy Movement (Korean: 2·28 대구 학생 시위) was a 1960 protest by high school students in Daegu against the Syngmann Rhee government's unjust interference in the election. It is considered the first democracy movement of South Korea. It served as a catalyst for the 1960 April Revolution by raising democratic awareness among students.

== Beginning ==
Sunday, February 28, 1960 was the opposition Democratic Party's president and vice presidential candidate Chang Myon's campaign assembly in Daegu. On that day, the authorities commanded students to go to school so as to prevent their attendance at the Democratic Party's campaign rally, an action that became the source of the Daegu Democracy Movement.

== Summary ==
Kyeongbuk High School ordered students to go to school on Sunday, February 28, 1960 on the grounds of advancing the midterm date in March. Seven other public high schools also ordered students to go to school, even offering unusual pretexts such as hare hunting or watching movies. February 27, 1960, at his home in Dongin-dong, Daegu, the chairman of the student government of Kyeongbuk High School, Dae-Woo Lee, along with 8 students from Kyeongbuk High School, Daegu High School and Kyungpook National University High School made a resolution to organize a demonstration in protest of the unfairness of the action ordering students to go to school on a Sunday. While on February 28 at 1:00 pm, 800 students marched to the provincial government building via Daegu's Banwoldang station, and more students from other schools began joining the demonstration. When they met Chang Myon on the way to his campaign rally, they cried hurrah.

The governor said of the students, "They are all Communists," but most citizens stopped police who were beating students, cheered for them, and there were ladies who hid students by concealing their hats under the hem of their skirts.

One thousand two hundred students joined this movement, and 120 students were arrested by the police, but police were worried about spreading demonstrations and so released most of the students excepting some of the leaders.

== Resolution ==
At 12:55 pm, the chairman of student government of Kyeongbuk High School, Dae-Woo Lee and company ascended the podium and read this resolution, after which students shouted and clapped:

"These million students, if you have a blood, then hesitate not but stand up for our sacred rights. Now at this very moment, the students' red blood is racing, and our spirit is to fight until our last breath to destroy the injustice that betrays justice itself, and our appeal is for reason based in righteousness."

So it is said that the fight against the dictatorship began in Daegu.

== Main Agent of the Movement ==
The main agent of the Daegu Democracy Movement was high school students, and it was the student movement and their planned demonstration that prepared Korea for the national movement.

The movement was followed by the 6.10 Movement, Gwangju Student Independence Movement, and it became the first of the student movements that broke out in Korea's postwar period. It was notably the main cause of the April Revolution, which provided the crucial opportunity to destroy the dictatorship and had an effect on the opposition movement for establishing diplomatic relations between Korea and Japan.

- Kyeongbuk High School
- Kyungpook National University High School
- Daegu High School
- Daegu Sangwon High School
- Daegu Natural Science High School
- Daegu Technical High School
- Gyungbuk Girl's High School
- Daegu Girls' High School

Daegu soon turned into a scene of excitement filled with calls for democratization. At this period, people were enraged with the Liberal Party's maladministration during incidents like Busan Government Crisis in 1952, the Constitutional Amendment rounding off to the nearest integer incident in 1954, The Accident of the Progressive Party, 1958, and concluded with the March 1960 South Korean presidential election.

== Memorials ==
February 28th Jungang Memorial Park

- April 10, 1961: 2.28 Daegu Democracy Movement Monument was founded in Myeongdeok Station by donations from Daegu citizens, led by the newspaper Maeil.
- February 28, 1990: 2.28 Daegu Democracy Movement Monument moved to Duryu Park from Myeongdeok Station.
- In 2003, the February 28th Jungang Memorial Park was established.

== See also ==
- March 1960 South Korean presidential election
- April Revolution
- Syngman Rhee
- Chang Myon
