= Konkuk University Law School =

Law school in Seoul, South Korea

- Motto in English: Sincerity (성, 誠), Fidelity (신, 信), Righteousness (의, 義)
- Type: Private
- Established: 2008
- Chairman: Kim Kyung-Hee
- Dean: Choi Yoon-hee
- Faculty: 39
- Students: 120 JD (Expected, currently 80 for 1L & 2L)
- Location: (South Korea) Seoul, South Korea; 37°32′31″N 127°04′35″E
- Campus: Urban
- Colors: Green
- Nickname: KU Law
- Website: lawschool.konkuk.ac.kr
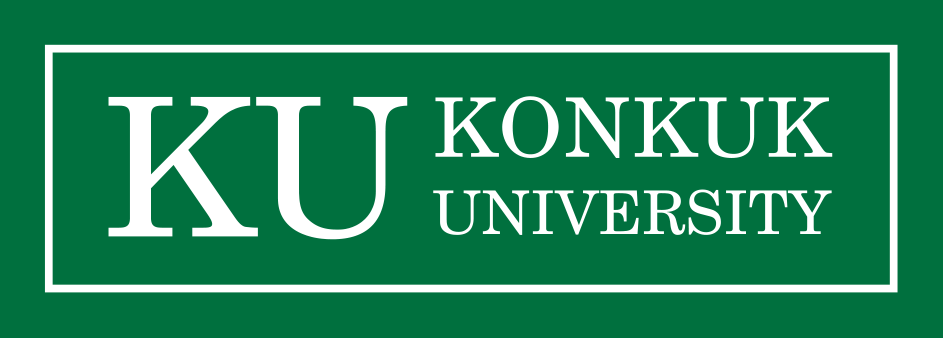

Korean name
- Hangul: 건국대학교 법학전문대학원
- Hanja: 建國大學校 法學專門大學院
- RR: Geonguk daehakgyo beophak jeonmun daehagwon
- MR: Kŏn'guk taehakkyo pŏphak chŏnmun taehagwŏn

Konkuk University Law School (also known as Konkuk Law School or KU Law; Korean: 건국대학교 법학전문대학원) is one of the professional graduate schools of Konkuk University, formerly known as the College of Law. Located in Seoul, Republic of Korea, it is one of the 25 government approved law schools. It plans to specialize in real estates law and offers scholarship to all students.

== History ==
Dr. You Suk Chang established the Chosun Political Science School in 1946 and later became Konkuk University in 1959. In 1954, the College of Law was established. The college graduated around 8,000 students since its founding. In 2009, the College of Law was changed to law school and no longer accepts undergraduates.

=== Chronology ===
- May 1946 -Chosun Political Science School established.
- February 1959 -Law Department at the College of Politics established
- January 1965 -The College of Law and Politics separated from the College of Politics.
- October 1987 -The College of Law was separated from the College of Law and Politics.
- March 1988 -Closure of the second campus of the College of Law
- March 2003 -Undergraduate enrollment each year increased from 120 to 200.
- August 2006- Completion of the Law Library and Annex
- March 2009- First class for Law School

== Admission ==
Admission to Konkuk Law is highly selective: For the class entering in 2009, there were approximately 304 applicants, of which 40 were admitted. 22 applicants had a perfect TOEIC score and the median composite LEET score was around 115. The applicants were varied; there were many who come from U.S. and Canadian universities as well as U.S. licensed attorneys. About 2/3 were male.

The applicants were evaluated based on their undergraduate GPA, LEET (standardized law school admission exam), admissions essays and personal/case interviews. Konkuk Law also gave one and half hour written exam which tests the applicants analytical skills. Interviews were conducted by five faculty members who evaluate the applicant's personal merit and logical skills.

Seoul National University produced the largest number of acceptance- twelve, followed by Yonsei University, eleven and Korea University and Ewha Womans University each producing two. Sogang University, Hongik University, Chung-Ang University, Sookmyung Women's University, Pusan National University, George Washington University, University of California, Berkeley each had one acceptance.

Only 15% of them majored in law as undergraduate – the percentage of L.L.B (bachelor of law), those who studied law in college is much higher in other schools, such as Korea University where the ratio was 59%. The overall percentage of LLB in all schools is 33.7%.

== Notable faculty ==
- Hong Il-pyo (former chief of the Judicial Research and Training Institute)
- Choi Yoon-hee (attorney, judge and prosecutor, former professor at the Judicial Research and Training Institute)
- Jeong Hae-bang (former vice-minister of the Ministry of Planning and Budget)

== Notable alumni ==
- Lee Sang Kyu (former vice-minister of Education)
- Goh Young Gu (former president of National Intelligence Service)

== Programs ==
- Juris Doctor (J.D.) Program
- Joint degree programs
  - J.D./L.L.M (with Chicago-Kent)- Konkuk Law School is in discussion with Chicago-Kent College of Law for joint-degree program. The program allows the Konkuk students to spend their third year at Chicago-Kent and receive both JD and LLM from Konkuk and Chicago-Kent. This LLM program exposes the Konkuk law students to American law as well as makes them eligible to take the bar exam in the U.S., allowing them to be admitted to bar in both Korea and U.S.
- Exchange Programs

The school has an exchange program with Chicago-Kent.

== Scholarship ==
A half of each class of the JD program receive scholarship that cover the full tuition. The other half receive scholarship that covers half of the tuition.

== Facility ==
=== The Law Building ===
The law building consists of one underground level and five over ground levels and contains 4,400 square meters of space.

=== The Law Library ===
The first floor contains monographs and law books and the second floor contains government publications and other research materials.

=== Iluhun ===
Iluhun (일우헌) is a university's residential hall for the students preparing for the goshi(national examinations, 고시).

== Academic Societies ==
- Private Law Studies Society
- Public Law Studies Society
- Society of Studies of Jurisprudence
- Society of Case Studies
- College of Law Newspaper (Boepinjungun)
- Juriscampus

== See also ==
- Law schools in South Korea
- Legal Education Eligibility Test

== Bibliography ==
- Konkuk University College of Law Brochure.
