= Jemal Abafita Ababulgu =

Ethiopian academic (born 1974)

- Born: 30 June 1974 (age 52)
- Education: Addis Ababa University (BSc, MSc); Kangwon National University (PhD)
- Occupation: Academic

Jemal Abafita Ababulgu is an Ethiopian academic. He served as the President of Jimma University from 2019 to August 7, 2026 and holds the position of associate professor in the Department of Economics at the same institution.

== Early life and education ==
Jemal Abafita Ababulgu was born on 30 June 1974. He completed his Bachelor of Science in statistics from Addis Ababa University in 1994. He pursued further studies and obtained his Master of Science in economics with a specialization in Economic Policy Analysis from Addis Ababa University in 2003. He completed his doctoral studies at Kangwon National University in South Korea, where he earned his PhD in economics with a focus on Agriculture and Resource Economics in 2014.

== Career ==
Abafita began his career at Jimma University in 2003, where he served as a lecturer in the Department of Economics and is currently serving as the president of Jimma University and an associate professor. He has also served as a board member of Hijra Bank for three years since its establishment in February 2020.

== Publications ==
Year	Title	Credit	Ref
2022	Self-reported side effects of the Oxford AstraZeneca COVID-19 vaccine among healthcare workers in Ethiopia, Africa: A cross-sectional study	Co-author	
2022	Differential effect of prenatal exposure to the Great Ethiopian Famine (1983–85) on the risk of adulthood hypertension based on sex: a historical cohort study	Co-author	
2022	Impact of coffee exports on economic growth in Ethiopia; An empirical investigation	Co-author	
2022	Impact of prenatal famine exposure on adulthood fasting blood glucose level	Co-author	
2021	Risk perceptions and attitudinal responses to COVID-19 pandemic: an online survey in Ethiopia	Co-author	
