= Uijeongbu scandal =

1997 political scandal in South Korea

- Hangul: 의정부 이순호 변호사 사건
- Hanja: 議政府 李順浩 辯護士 事件
- Revised Romanization: Uijeongbu I Sunho Byeonhosa Sageon
- McCune–Reischauer: Uijŏngbu I Sunho Pyŏnhosa Sakŏn

- Uijeongbu scandal
- Hangul: 대전 이종기 변호사 사건
- Hanja: 大田 李宗基 辯護士 事件
- Revised Romanization: Daejeon I Jonggi Byeonhosa Sageon
- McCune–Reischauer: Taejŏn I Chonggi Pyŏnhosa Sakŏn

The Uijeongbu Yi Sun-ho lawyer scandal (Korean: 의정부 이순호 변호사 사건) was a 1997 judicial scandal in Uijeongbu, Gyeonggi-do, South Korea. For the first time in South Korean judicial history, prosecutors investigated a large number of sitting judges; they found that fifteen District Court judges had received millions of won in payments from attorneys. In the end the judges were not indicted because prosecutors believed the money had no direct connection with their legal duties. However, judges who received sums greater than one million won were obliged to resign, while those who received smaller amounts suffered demotion or disciplinary measures. Along with a 1998 bribery scandal in Daejeon, the Uijeongbu scandal was one of the motivations behind a law, finally passed by the National Assembly in 2000, which attempted to address the issue of special treatment shown to judges who retired to become lawyers in private practice. The scandals also lead to a revision of the code of judicial ethics banning cash thank-you gifts.
