= Kyeongbuk High School =

High school in Daegu, South Korea

Coordinates: 35°50′40″N 128°38′22″E

- Korean: 경북고등학교
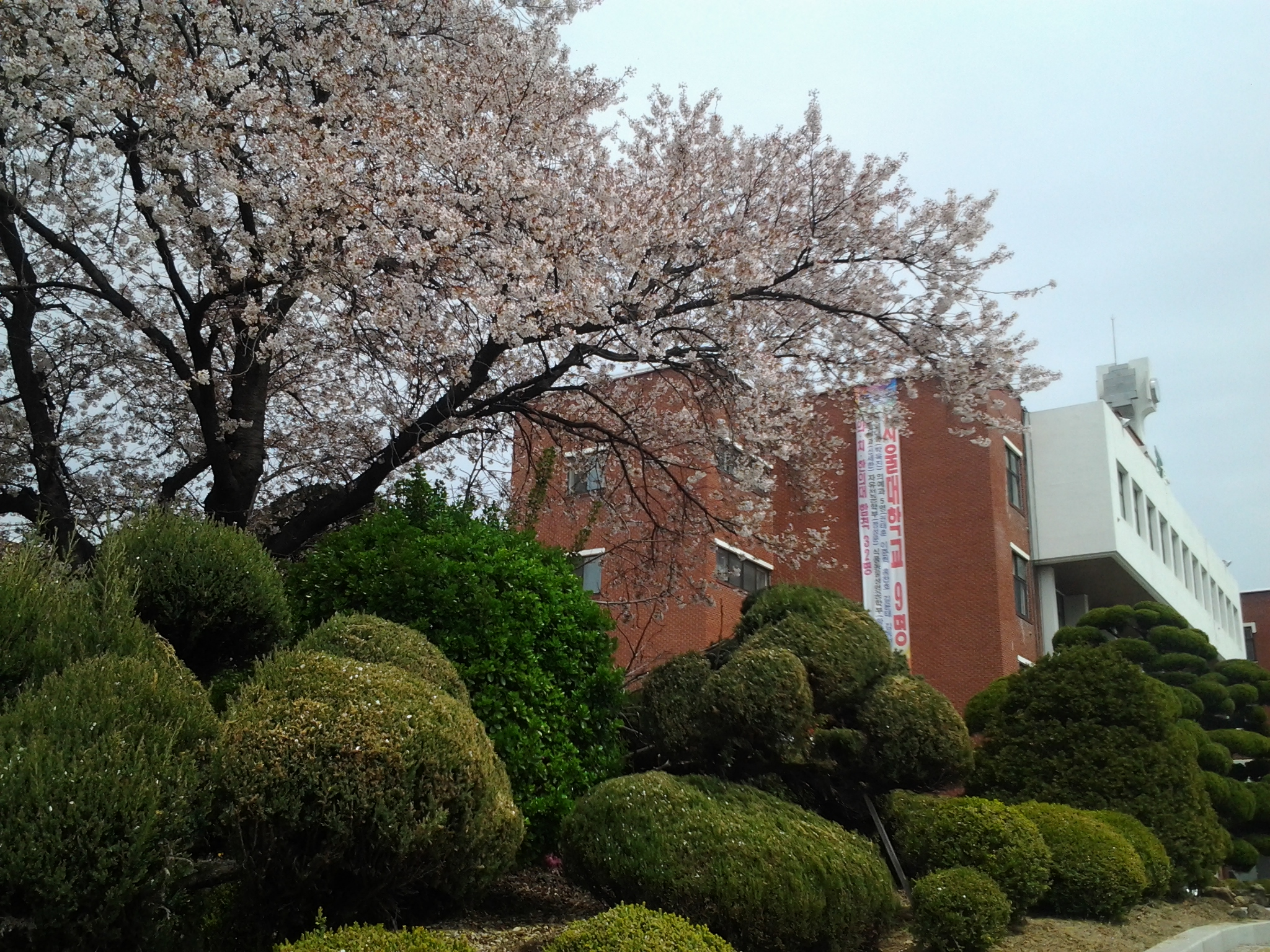
- Daegu; South Korea

Information
- Former names: Dalseong School (1899-1916); Hyeopseong School (1916-?)
- Established: 1899; 127 years ago

Kyeongbuk High School (Korean: 경북고등학교) is a boy's high school in Daegu, South Korea. As of 2026, there are 825 students.

== History ==
Kyeongbuk High School was opened in 1899 with the name of Dalseong School. On 16 May 1916, the school was integrated and renamed to Hyeopseong School. On 16 December 1917, the school was moved to Daebong-dong. It is the third public high school established by the government (Korean Empire) in the history of Korea. The school was pivotal in the February 28 Democracy Movement in 1960.

== Symbol ==
The school emblem features three leaves and a pen nib. The school motto is "Know, Think, Act" (아는 사람, 생각하는 사람, 행하는 사람).

== Baseball ==
The school won 30 national-level baseball tournaments.

== Notable alumni ==
- Roh Tae-woo (1932-2001), former president of South Korea
- Cho Hee-dae (1957-), Chief Justice of Supreme Court of South Korea
- Lee Jong-seok (1961-), President of the Constitutional Court of Korea
- Lee Seung-yuop (1976-), baseball player
