= Kim Chang-jong =

South Korean judge (born 1957)

Kim Chang-Jong
- 김창종
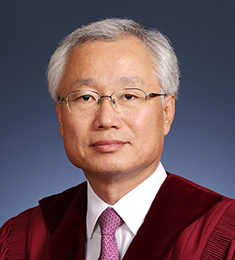

Justice of the Constitutional Court of Korea
- In office September 2012 – September 2018
- Nominated by: Yang Sung-tae (Chief Justice)
- Appointed by: Lee Myung-bak

Personal details
- Born: 20 March 1957 (age 69)
- Education: Kyungpook National University (LL.B., LL.M.)

Kim Chang-Jong is a former Justice of the Constitutional Court of Korea

== Early life ==
Born on March 20, 1957, Seonsan, North Gyeongsang Province ,(Now Gumi, Gyeongsangbuk-do Province) he graduated from Yongsan High School. He graduated from the Faculty of Law at Kyungpook National University. He graduated from the twelfth class of the Judicial Research and Training Institute. He served as Chief justice , Uiseong and Gimcheon branches of the Daegu District court, Chief Justice of the Daegu High court in 2010, and Chief justice, of the 40th, To the Daegu , District court and the Daegu Family court in 2012. In 2012, he was appointed as a judge of the Constitutional court by the Chief justice , Yang Sung-tae and President Lee Myung-bak, becoming the first judge from Daegu and North Gyeongsang Province regions to serve on the Constitutional court.

== Career ==
1985 Judge, Daegu District Court

1990 Judge, Gyeongju Branch of Daegu District Court

1992 Judge, Daegu High Court

1995 Judge Daegu District Court

1996 Chief Judge, Uiseong Branch of Daegu District Court

1997 Senior Judge, Daegu District Court

2001 Chief Judge, Gimcheon Branch of Daegu District Court

2003 Senior Judge, Daegu District Court

2005 Senior Judge, Daegu High Court

2009 Chief Senior Judge, Daegu District Court

2010 Chief Senior Judge, Daegu High Court

2012 Chief Judge, Daegu District Court

Current Justice, Constitutional Court (since Sep. 20, 2012)
