= Kangwon National University =

University in South Korea

Coordinates: 37°52′10″N 127°44′39″E

- 강원대학교
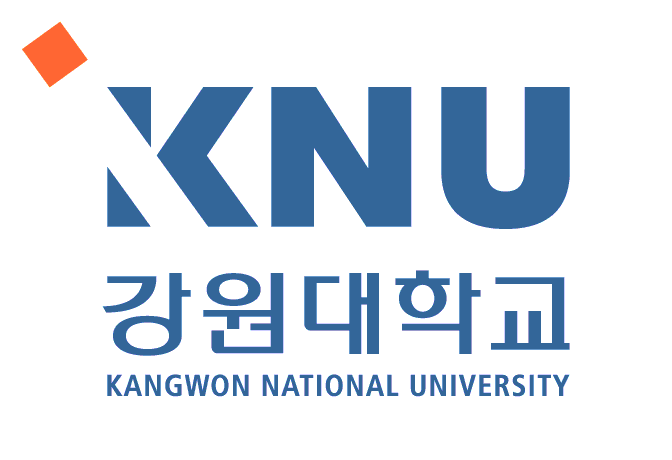
- Motto: Inquirere Veritatem Ex Praxe (Korean: Sil-Sa-Gu-Si) translation, "seek for the truth from reality, seek for the very truth to enable us to renovate the world as it should be from the world as it is."
- Type: National
- Established: June 14, 1947; 79 years ago
- President: Jeong Jae Yeon (정재연)
- Faculty: 964
- Administrative staff: 1,418
- Students: 38,264
- Undergraduates: 34,335
- Location: Chuncheon, Gangneung, Samcheok, Wonju, Gangwon, South Korea
- Campus: Chuncheon Campus Gangneung Campus Samcheok Campus Wonju Campus Dogye Campus (sub-campus)
- Colors: Blue and Orange
- Nickname: Open Campus (campaign motto)
- Mascots: Gomduri (Blue Bear, official)
- Website: www.kangwon.ac.kr/english

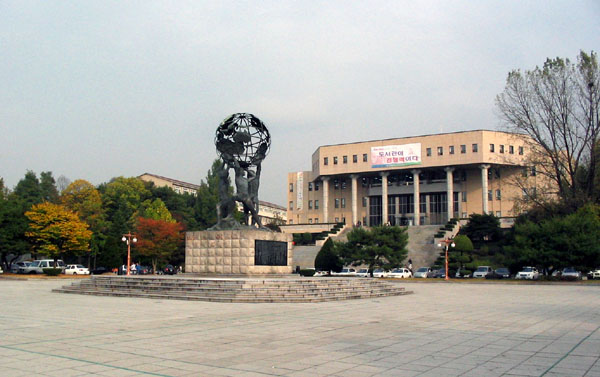
KangwonUniv Mirae

Kangwon National University (KNU, Korean: 강원대학교; RR: Gangwon Daehakgyo) is one of ten Flagship Korean National Universities in Gangwon, South Korea. In March 2026, the university merged with Gangneung-Wonju National University, becoming the first province-wide integrated national university in South Korea. The merged institution operates four campuses in Chuncheon, Gangneung, Samcheok, and Wonju, plus a sub-campus in Dogye, with around 30,000 students and 1,400 faculty members.

== Campuses ==
=== Chuncheon Campus ===
The Chuncheon Campus serves as the main campus and headquarters of the university. Located in Chuncheon, Gangwon Special Self-Governing Province, it focuses on education and research, particularly in precision medicine, bio-health, and data-related fields.

=== Gangneung Campus ===
The Gangneung Campus is located in Gangneung, Gangwon Province. Formerly the main campus of Gangneung-Wonju National University, it specializes in academia-industry-research cooperation, with strengths in marine bio, advanced materials, tourism, and sports science.

=== Samcheok Campus ===
The Samcheok Campus is located in Samcheok, Gangwon Province. It serves as a regional industry cooperation hub, linking the university with local industrial partners in the southern Gangwon region.

=== Wonju Campus ===
The Wonju Campus is located in Wonju, Gangwon Province. Formerly part of Gangneung-Wonju National University, it focuses on industry-academia partnerships, particularly in the semiconductor and advanced manufacturing sectors.

=== Dogye Campus ===
The Dogye Campus, located in Dogye-eup, Samcheok, functions as a sub-campus affiliated with the Samcheok Campus.

== History ==
Initially established as an agricultural college, Kangwon National University has steadily expanded to the comprehensive university encompassing a full spectrum of academic fields. KNU expanded in 1997 adding a medical degree program and in 2000 a University Hospital. A law school, now called 'Graduate School of Judicial Affairs', has been operated to the university's graduate schools in 2002, is the only laboratory school in South Korea, as a model for the very-early stage of 'reform on Korean legal system'. In 2006, KNU merged with Samcheok University, adding the colleges of Veterinary medicine and Information Technology to KNU's existing colleges. Since March 2, 2009, KNU operates a state-of-the-art professional Law School as one of the officially approved school by Korean Government.

== Undergraduate program ==
KNU comprises 19 colleges with 93 departments and five graduate schools. → List of Degree Program (Click)

- College of Business Administration
- College of Engineering
- College of Agriculture and Life Sciences
- College of Animal Life Sciences
- College of Art and Culture
- College of Education
- College of Social Sciences
- College of Forest and Environmental Sciences
- College of Nursing
- College of Veterinary Medicine
- College of Pharmacy
- College of Biomedical Sciences
- College of Humanities
- College of Natural Sciences
- College of Information Technology
- Division of Sports Science
- Interdisciplinary Program

== Graduate schools ==
Graduate School (Click)

- College of Humanities and Social Sciences
- College of Natural Sciences
- College of Engineering
- College of Art and Sports
- College of Medicine
- Specialty Graduate School
  - Graduate School of Education
  - Graduate School of Business
  - Graduate School of Industrial Technology
  - Graduate School of Information Science and Public Administration
  - Graduate School of Judicial Affairs
  - Graduate School of Green and Life Industry Policy
  - Law School
  - School of Medicine

== Enrollment ==
Current enrollment stands at more than 20,000 undergraduate and graduate students. Like many South Korean universities, KNU's academic schedule is also based on the semester system with the spring semester starting in first week of Mondays on March every year, and autumn semester usually starts in fourth week of Mondays in August.

== University life ==
=== Festival ===
Every year in May, Kangwon National University Students' Union is the main event of the school festival, which is held in Dae Dongje, which consists of clubs, flip-flops and other performances such as club performances, performances and invitations to famous entertainers.

University rankings

Regional – Overall
- QS Asia: =310 (2025)

Chuncheon, Capital city of Gangwon province which proclaims as 'leisure city', affords its residents a wealth of recreational activities. Lakes in Chuncheon nearby (Soyang-ho, Chuncheon-ho and Uiam-ho) offers water skiing and boating facilities as well as several islands on these lakes. Hiking in the nearby mountains and snow skiing (in Gangchon) are less than an hour's reach from the university.

== See also ==
- Flagship Korean National Universities
- List of national universities in South Korea
- List of universities and colleges in South Korea
- Education in Korea
