= Kim Yong-chul =

South Korean jurist and judge (1924–2023)

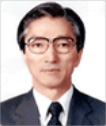

Chief Justice of the Supreme Court of Korea
- In office 23 April 1986 – 20 June 1988
- Preceded by: Yoo Tai-heung
- Succeeded by: Lee Il-gyu

Personal details
- Born: 17 December 1924 Seongju County, Korea, Empire of Japan
- Died: 14 March 2023 (aged 98)
- Education: Seoul National University
- Occupation: Jurist; Judge

Kim Yong-chul (Korean: 김용철; 17 December 1924 – 14 March 2023) was a South Korean jurist and judge.

== Career ==
He served as Chief Justice of the Supreme Court of Korea from 1986 to 1988.

Kim died on 14 March 2023, at the age of 98.
