= Chungnam National University Law School =

Law school in Daejeon, South Korea

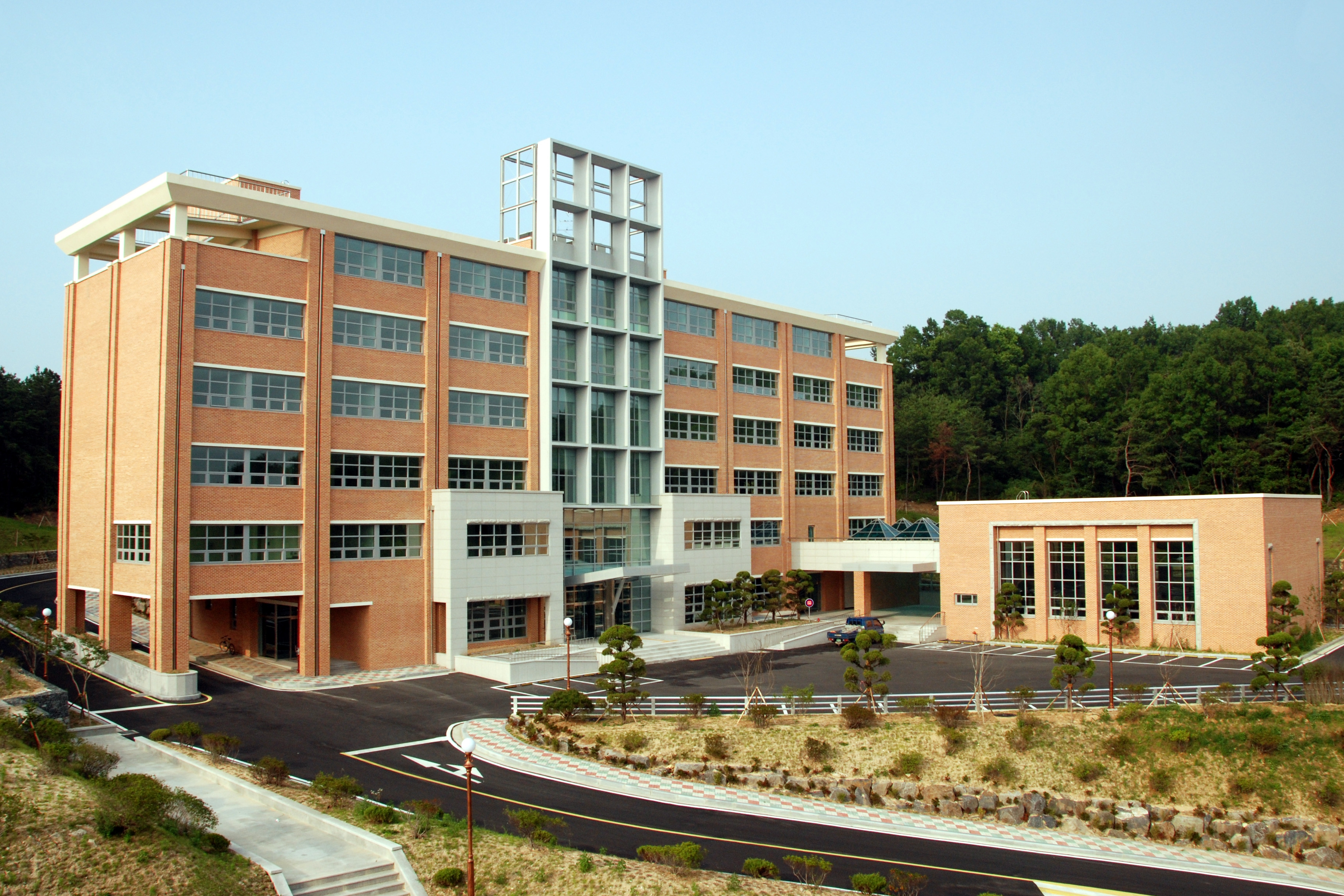
- The Law Building
- Established: 2009
- School type: National
- Location: Yuseong, Daejeon, South Korea; 36°22′36″N 127°20′41″E
- Enrollment: 300 (JD)
- Faculty: 32
- Website: law.cnu.ac.kr

- Chungnam National University Law School
- Hangul: 충남대학교 법학전문대학원
- Hanja: 忠南大學校 法學専門大學院
- RR: Chungnam daehakgyo beophak jeonmun daehagwon
- MR: Ch'ungnam taehakkyo pŏphak chŏnmun taehagwŏn

Chungnam National University Law School (CNULS, colloquially referred as Chungnam Law) is the professional graduate law school of Chungnam National University located in Daejeon, South Korea. Established in 2009, Chungnam Law is one of only twenty-five officially-accredited law schools of South Korea, only whose graduates can take unified bar examination of South Korea.

Chungnam Law offers courses for JD, SJD and PhD in Law; each class in Chungnam Law's three-year JD program enrolls about one hundred students, making it one of big law schools in South Korea where law student enrollment is tightly capped at 2,000 each year by the government.

Located in the same city with South Korean Patent Court and numerous research institutes and laboratories in Daedeok Science Town, Chungnam Law specializes in Intellectual Property Law: its JD students frequently winning annual National Patent Moot Competition.

== Website ==
- Official website
