= Kim Deok-ju =

South Korean lawyer and judge (1933–2023)

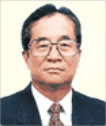

Chief Justice of the Supreme Court of Korea
- In office 16 December 1990 – 10 September 1993
- Preceded by: Lee Il-kyu
- Succeeded by: Yun Kwan

Personal details
- Born: 29 September 1933 Chūseinan-dō, Korea, Empire of Japan
- Died: 5 January 2023 (aged 89)
- Education: Seoul National University
- Occupation: Lawyer; Judge

Korean name
- Hangul: 김덕주
- Hanja: 金德柱
- RR: Gim Deokju
- MR: Kim Tŏkchu

Kim Deok-ju (Korean: 김덕주; 29 September 1933 – 5 January 2023) was a South Korean lawyer and judge.

== Career ==
He served as Chief Justice of the Supreme Court of Korea from 1990 to 1993.

Kim died on 5 January 2023, at the age of 89.
