= Gangneung–Wonju National University =

National research university in South Korea

Coordinates: 37°46′7.6″N 128°52′12.5″E

Gangneung-Wonju National University
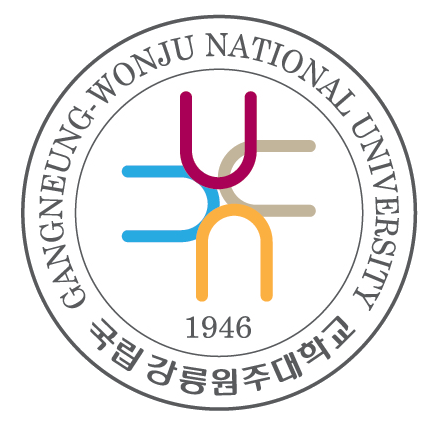
- Other name: GWNU
- Motto: 꿈을 향한 동행, 미래를 여는 대학
- Motto in English: A companion toward your dream, A university opening up your future
- Type: National
- Established: 1946
- President: Park Duck-young
- Faculty: 805 (2022)
- Administrative staff: 391 (2021)
- Undergraduates: 10,548 (2021)
- Postgraduates: 702 (2018)
- Location: Gangneung and Wonju, Gangwon-do, South Korea
- Campus: Suburban, 0.82 km^{2} (Gangneung: 0.66km^{2}, Wonju: 0.15km^{2})
- Colours: Burgundy; Sky blue Yellow; Beige
- Website: gwnu.ac.kr

Korean name
- Hangul: 강릉원주대학교
- Hanja: 江陵原州大學校
- RR: Gangneung Wonju daehakgyo
- MR: Kangnŭng Wŏnju taehakkyo

Gangneung–Wonju National University (GWNU; Korean: 강릉원주대학교) is a national research university with two campuses, in Gangneung and Wonju, South Korea. Founded in 1946, GWNU is situated on the east coast of the country. The institution traces its roots to Gangneung Normal School and Wonju Nursing Higher Technical School, which were established in 1946 and 1967, respectively. The two schools merged in 2007, and the institution was renamed in 2009.

GWNU comprises 9 colleges, 49 departments and divisions, a general graduate school, and 3 specialized graduate schools. It operates the Gangneung-Wonju National University Dental Hospital, located in Gangneung, and the Gangneung–Wonju National University Kindergarten, in Wonju. Additionally, the university features 35 auxiliary facilities, including the Center for Educational Research & Innovation and the Lifelong Education Center, along with 27 research institutes, such as the Institute of Humanities and the East Coast Life Science Research Institute.

== History ==
Gangneung–Wonju National University (GWNU) was established in 2007, through the merger of Gangneung National University and Wonju National College.

=== 1946–1978 ===
Following the 1945 liberation of Korea, the departure of Japanese educators coincided with an increase in primary school enrollment. In response, the educational authorities of the United States Army Military Government in Korea (USAMGIK) decided to restructure the ten normal schools established during the Japanese colonial period. Under this plan, three schools were designated for training secondary school teachers, while the remaining seven maintained their focus on primary education. Concurrently, the government authorized the establishment of new public normal schools in several cities, including Gangneung, Kaesong, Busan, and Chungju.

In 1946, the public Gangneung Normal School was founded, alongside Kyungpo middle school. It initially used the campuses of what are now Myeongju Elementary School and Jungang Elementary School. Before its eventual closure, Gangneung Normal School produced a total of 2,047 primary school educators across 15 graduating classes.

Following the outbreak of the Korean War in June 1950, the school was forced to temporarily suspend operations. To maintain its academic curriculum during the conflict, the institution established a special refugee school in Busan.

The institution continued to expand, establishing the Jungang Elementary School in 1957 and the Gangneung high school in 1961. However, this growth was halted due to a major restructuring of the primary teacher training system, and as a result, Gangneung Normal School ceased admitting new students for the 1962 academic year and was officially closed in 1963.

In 1966, the Committee for the Promotion of Establishing Gangneung Teachers College was formed by the local community. The committee persistently petitioned the Ministry of Education of the Republic of Korea, emphasizing the necessity for establishing a teachers college in the Yeongdong region. These efforts culminated in August 1968, when the institution was re-established as Gangneung Teachers College, pursuant to Presidential Decree No. 3535.

Concurrently, in March 1967, Wonju Nursing Higher Technical School was authorized and opened as a public institution. Five years after its inception, the school was restructured and upgraded to Wonju Nursing Vocational School, in December 1972.

=== 1970–1990 ===
In December 1977, Gangneung Teachers College, which had served as the primary teacher training institution for the Yeongdong region, was reorganized into Gangneung Junior College and officially opened in March 1978. Following a government policy to merge junior colleges and vocational schools into a unified junior college system, the institution's academic structure was upgraded to a four-year curriculum in 1979. Consequently, the institution bypassed the junior college transition and was elevated directly to Gangneung College, a four-year undergraduate institution.

Concurrently, in 1979, Wonju Nursing Vocational School was reorganized under the junior college system and renamed Wonju Nursing Junior College. While it had previously functioned strictly as a specialized nursing institution, it expanded its academic scope by establishing the Department of Early Childhood Education in 1981. The following year, the school was transferred to national ownership and renamed Wonju National Junior College. The following year, the institution significantly expanded its facilities by relocating its campus from Wonin-dong to its current location.

=== 1991–1999 ===
In 1991, Gangneung College was elevated to a comprehensive national university and renamed Kangnung National University. The 163rd Reserve Officers' Training Corps was held on the campus in 1992.

In 1994, the university established the 11th dental college in South Korea, which remains the only dental school in the Gangwon region. The Gangneung-Wonju National University Dental Hospital officially opened in 1997.

During this period, student movements advocating for campus democratization and political reforms became prominent. When local organized crime groups interfered with student elections by obstructing candidate registrations, students organized widespread protests. Following the fatal beating of the student activist Kang Kyung-dae at Myongji University in 1991, students from Kangnung National University collaborated with peers from Kwandong University and Yeongdong Junior College to conduct large-scale street demonstrations.

Concurrently, responding to regional demands to supply technical professionals to nearby industrial complexes, Wonju National Junior College expanded its curriculum to offer associate degrees in engineering disciplines. In 1999, the institution officially changed its name to Wonju National College.

=== 2000–present ===
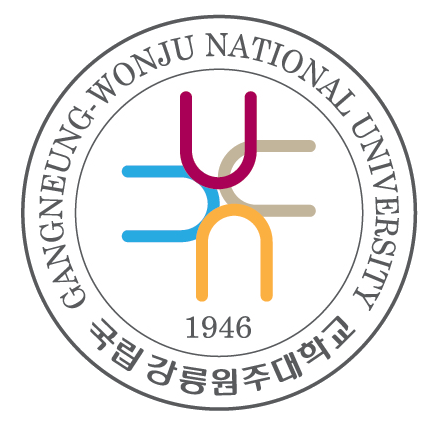
The new UI used since October 2010, following the merger.

During the 2000s, in accordance with the national university restructuring policies instituted by the Ministry of Education and Human Resources Development of South Korea, Kangnung National University initiated merger proceedings with Wonju National Junior College. In October 2005, the presidents of both institutions signed a basic memorandum of understanding for the merger. Following an official review in 2006, the integration was finalized in 2007.

Following the merger, the university formed the School Name Selection Committee to discuss a new institutional name, as previously agreed upon. This process faced significant challenges due to conflicting interests among civic groups and stakeholders in both Gangneung and Wonju. The conflict escalated into a major community issue as it moved beyond an internal campus dispute, drawing active participation from local societies and civic groups in both Gangneung and Wonju. In March 2008, the School Name Selection Committee officially selected Gangneung–Wonju National University as its top choice for the new university name, and a year later, the name change was approved, and the newly established Gangneung–Wonju National University, now with two campuses, formally reopened.

In response to the deepening demographic cliff and the sharp decline in the school-age population in South Korea during the 2020s, the university initiated merger talks with Kangwon National University. This plan was initially opposed by local communities and the Kangwon National University student council. However, the unification plan gained momentum after being selected for the Yoon Suk Yeol administration's Glocal University 30 project, paving the way for the launch of a newly integrated Kangwon National University.

Gangneung–Wonju National University Promotional Pavilion

The Gangneung–Wonju National University Promotional Pavilion opened in March 2013, with the dual purpose of promoting the university and fostering communication with the local community by providing small-scale performance facilities. Located in Gangneung, it operates as a distinct entity from the Gangneung-Wonju National University Museum, which houses the university's historical archives. The pavilion also serves as the final destination of the Hagiseubji-gil the 16th section of the Baugil trail, which commences at the university's Haeramji Lake.

== President ==
Park Duck-young, a professor from the College of Dentistry, serves as the university president, with his term scheduled to run until 2028.

== Academic structure ==
=== Undergraduate programs ===
The undergraduate curriculum at GWNU is organized into departments, divisions, and majors under each college, with the primary objective of conferring bachelor's degrees.

The Gangneung Campus has seven colleges: the College of Humanities, College of Social Sciences, College of Natural Sciences, College of Life Sciences), College of Engineering), College of Arts and Sports), and College of Dentistry.

The Wonju Campus has two colleges: the College of Health and Welfare and the College of Science and Technology.

=== Graduate programs ===
The graduate division of GWNU consists of one general graduate school and three specialized graduate schools. The departments offered in the general graduate school consist of 57 master's degree programs and 43 doctoral degree programs.

== Student support and academic exchanges ==
=== International exchanges ===
The International Affairs Team at GWNU operates student exchange programs with its academic partner institutions. Students must meet specific academic credit and language proficiency requirements, while final admission decisions are made by the host institution. As of December 2022, GWNU maintained academic exchange agreements with 42 universities across 17 countries worldwide.

=== Domestic exchanges ===
In accordance with national agreements on domestic inter-university student exchange and credit recognition, GWNU officially recognized regular semester credits earned at 22 partner institutions as of 2019. These included 17 member universities of the Council of presidents of National Core Universities, alongside Kangwon National University, the University of Science and Technology, Jeju National University, Chungnam National University, and Chungbuk National University.

=== Scholarships ===
The university operates a variety of internal scholarship programs.

== Status ==
=== Reputation ===
GWNU's research achievements in life sciences, specifically specializing in biotechnology, are recognized for introducing new paradigms to marine industries across Gangneung and the East Sea region.

The Presidential Advisory Council on Science and Technology includes GWNU among the 50 major research-oriented universities designated to conduct specialized research in the fields of natural sciences and engineering.

Established in 1992 as the 11th dental school in the nation to meet demand for dental professionals due to a nationwide shortage in the 1990s, the College of Dentistry and the Dental Hospital at GWNU had produced more than 700 dentists by 2019. Prior to the establishment of the Gangneung-Wonju National University Dental Hospital—the only dental hospital in Gangwon Province—the Yeongdong region lacked specialized dental care infrastructure. The institution regularly dispatches medical volunteer teams to countries such as Mongolia, Indonesia, Thailand, Vietnam, and Cambodia.

=== Research activities ===
GWNU maintains a research presence in the field of atmospheric sciences. (Note: Gangwon Province features rugged mountainous areas, and it is characterized by the presence of the Taebaek Mountains, which often causes weather phenomena to occur differently compared to inland areas.)

The university has established the Radiation and Satellite Meteorology Research Institute, the first institution in South Korea dedicated to researching thermal radiation and meteorological satellites. The Gangwon Regional Office of Meteorology collaborates with the university's Department of Atmospheric and Environmental Sciences to improve weather forecasting accuracy and severe weather prediction in the Yeongdong region. To facilitate smooth government–academic cooperation, the High-Impact Weather Research Center under the National Institute of Meteorological Sciences has been located within the Gangneung campus since 2012, conducting joint research initiatives on hazardous weather forecasting.

To address rapidly changing marine ecosystems, the university operates the South–North Seaweed Resource Exchange Institute, which conducts research on restoring marine algal ecosystems, including kelp forests, and facilitates resource exchanges with North Korea.

In response to the 2019 Goseong fire, GWNU partnered with Kangwon National University to address the severity of forest destruction and community impact. The two institutions conduct joint research and development projects to establish systematic response mechanisms for large-scale wildfires and to restore damaged forest areas.

Following the South Korean government's announcement of the Second Innovation City Plan, the university became the first comprehensive academic institution in Gangwon Province to launch related research initiatives.

Additionally, in response to the 2019–2023 Japan–South Korea trade dispute, the university launched technology self-reliance initiatives to support businesses in the Gangwon region. This research was conducted in collaboration with project teams from four other regional universities: Catholic Kwandong University, Kangwon National University, Yonsei University Mirae Campus, and Hallym University, providing localized technical solutions to regional industries.

=== Government-funded projects ===
In 2012, GWNU participated in the Leaders in Industry-university Cooperation (LINC) project. Following its successful performance, the university was selected in 2017 for the successor initiative, the Leaders in Industry–University Cooperation Plus (LINC+) project. The program received recognition for actively engaging and cooperating with diverse local stakeholders, including small business owners, farmers, and fishers. In 2019, the university was selected for the second stage of the LINC+ fostering project, allowing it to sustain these initiatives. It continued its momentum with subsequent projects after being selected for the "Customized Demand Type" category under LINC 3.0, the next-generation Leaders in Industry–University Cooperation initiative.

In 2014, the university was selected for the University for Creative Korea project. Under this initiative, it established the East Coast Marine Bio-Industry Creative Talent Fostering Project Group to conduct specialized marine biotechnology research, securing government funding centered around the College of Life Sciences. In recognition of its excellence in the marine bio-industry, the university's East Coast Life Science Research Institute was selected in 2018 for the Science and Engineering University Priority Research Institute Support Project, an initiative overseen by the Ministry of Education and the National Research Foundation of Korea. Securing approximately 5.6 billion KRW in funding, the institute has been conducting research titled "Immunotherapeutic Agents Derived from Marine Organisms".

Additionally, in acknowledgment of its institutional research capacity and technical expertise in STEM fields, the university has been operating the Youth Technology Licensing Office Fostering Project since 2018. Through this program, the university employs science and engineering graduates to provide advanced training in specialized technical skills.

=== Social contribution ===
Since 2007, GWNU has operated the Haeram International Volunteer Corps, dispatching teams to countries such as Mongolia and Nepal to conduct educational services and dental care initiatives. In 2017, the volunteer corps was recognized as the "Best Program" by the Korean University Council for Social Service.

Additionally, voluntary social contribution activities have been conducted within the university's student body. For instance, following the 2022 Uljin forest fire, students organized voluntary fundraising and donation drives to support displaced residents in the affected areas.

== Campuses ==
=== Gangneung campus ===
The Gangneung Campus of GWNU spans across Jibyeon-dong and Yucheon-dong, covering an area of approximately 660,000m² The current site has been in use since 1980, when Gangneung National University relocated from the Chodang Campus to the Jibyeon Campus, prior to the official launch of GWNU. As the campus that serves as the university headquarters, it houses about 50 buildings.

==== Chodang campus ====
This is the campus of Kangnung National University that was established in the Chodang-dong area of Gangneung. It originally housed various buildings, including the university headquarters, a gymnasium, and lecture halls, and was used until Gangneung College relocated to the current Jibyeon Campus in 1980. The site is occupied by Gangneung High School and the Gangwon-do Education Research & Institute.

=== Wonju campus ===
The Wonju Campus of GWNU is located in Heungup-ri, covering a campus area of approximately 120,000m². The current site has been in use since 1983, when the former Wonju College relocated from the Wondong Campus to the Heungup Campus, and it houses about 20 buildings.

==== Wondong campus ====
This is the campus of Wonju College that was established in the Wonin-dong area of Wonju. It was used until Wonju College relocated to the Heungup Campus in 1983.

==== Munmak campus ====
GWNU has pushed for the establishment of a new campus within the Munmak Bangye Industrial Complex, receiving 33 billion won in national funding in 2019, along with financial support from Gangwon Province and the city of Wonju, and with land provided by the Korea Industrial Complex Corporation.

== Gallery ==
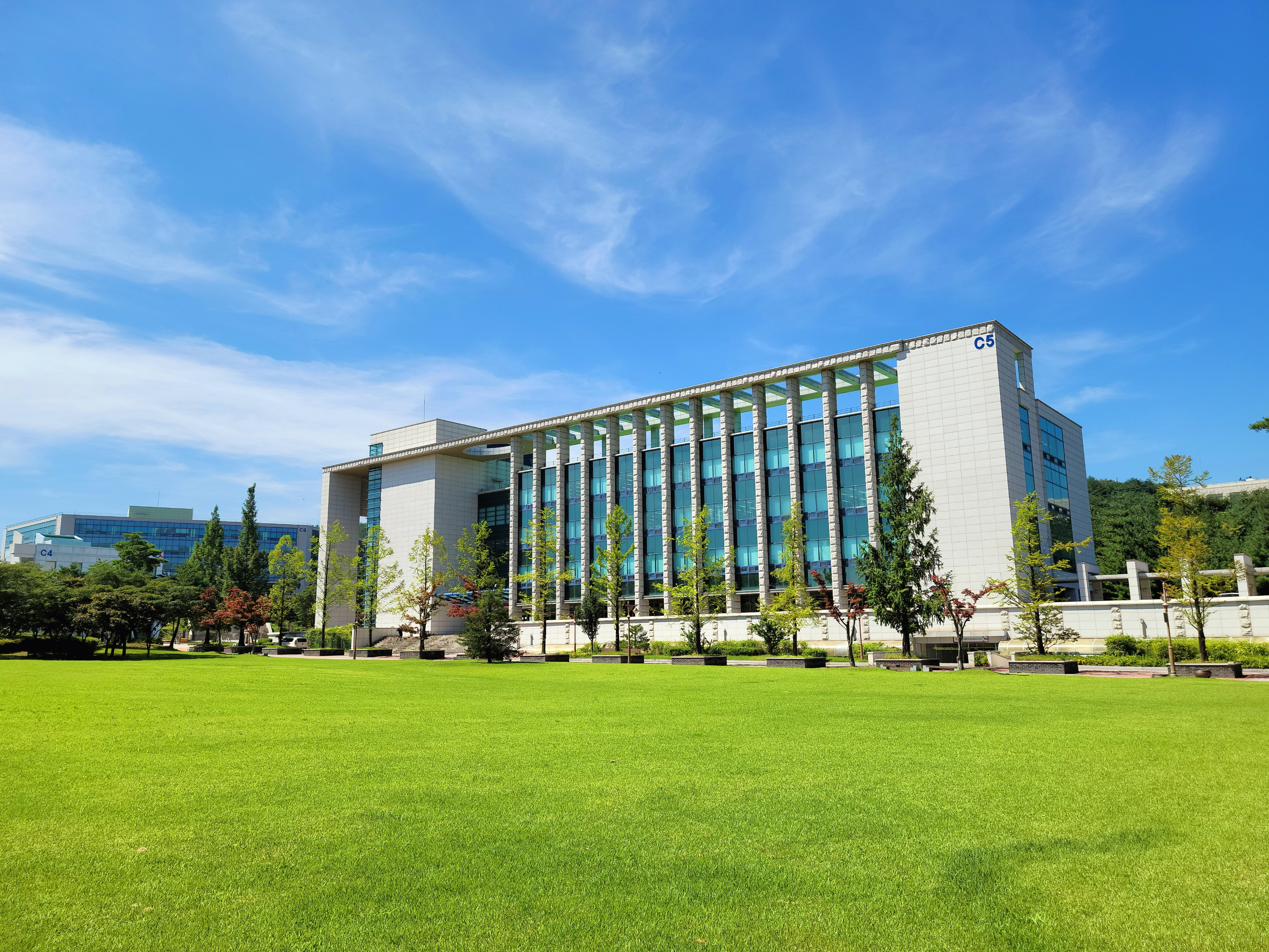
GWNU library

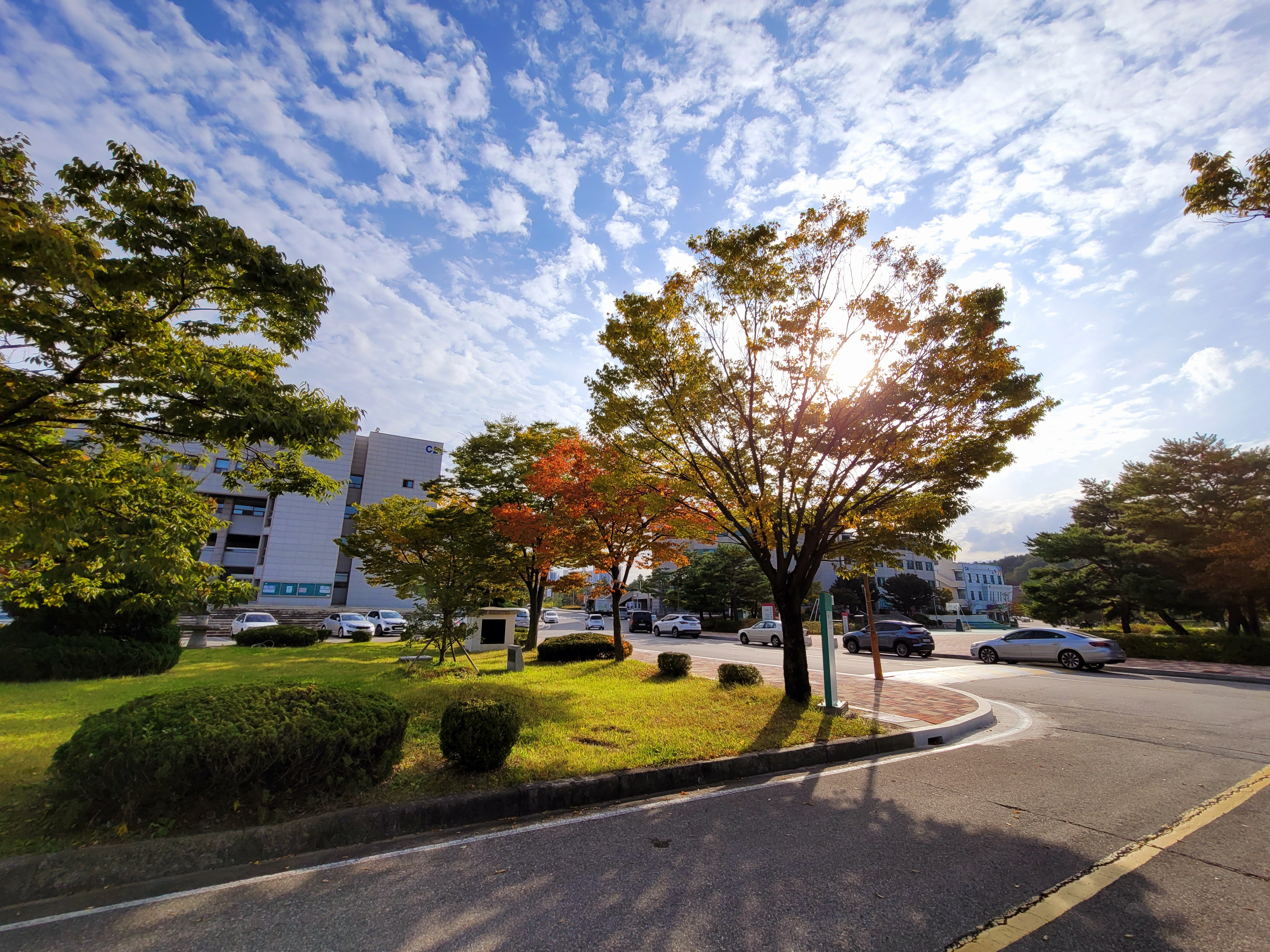
GWNU humanities building

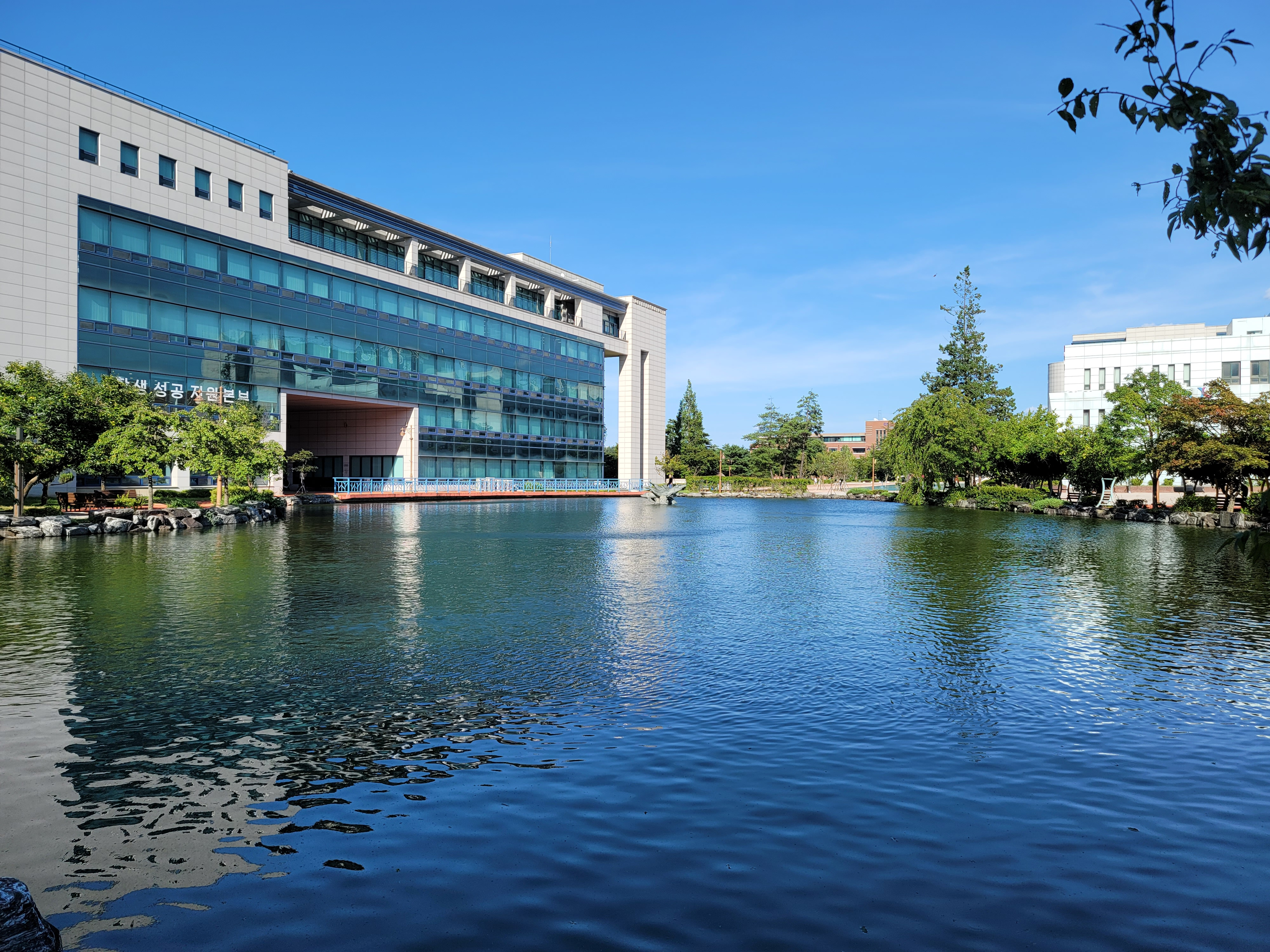
Haeramji

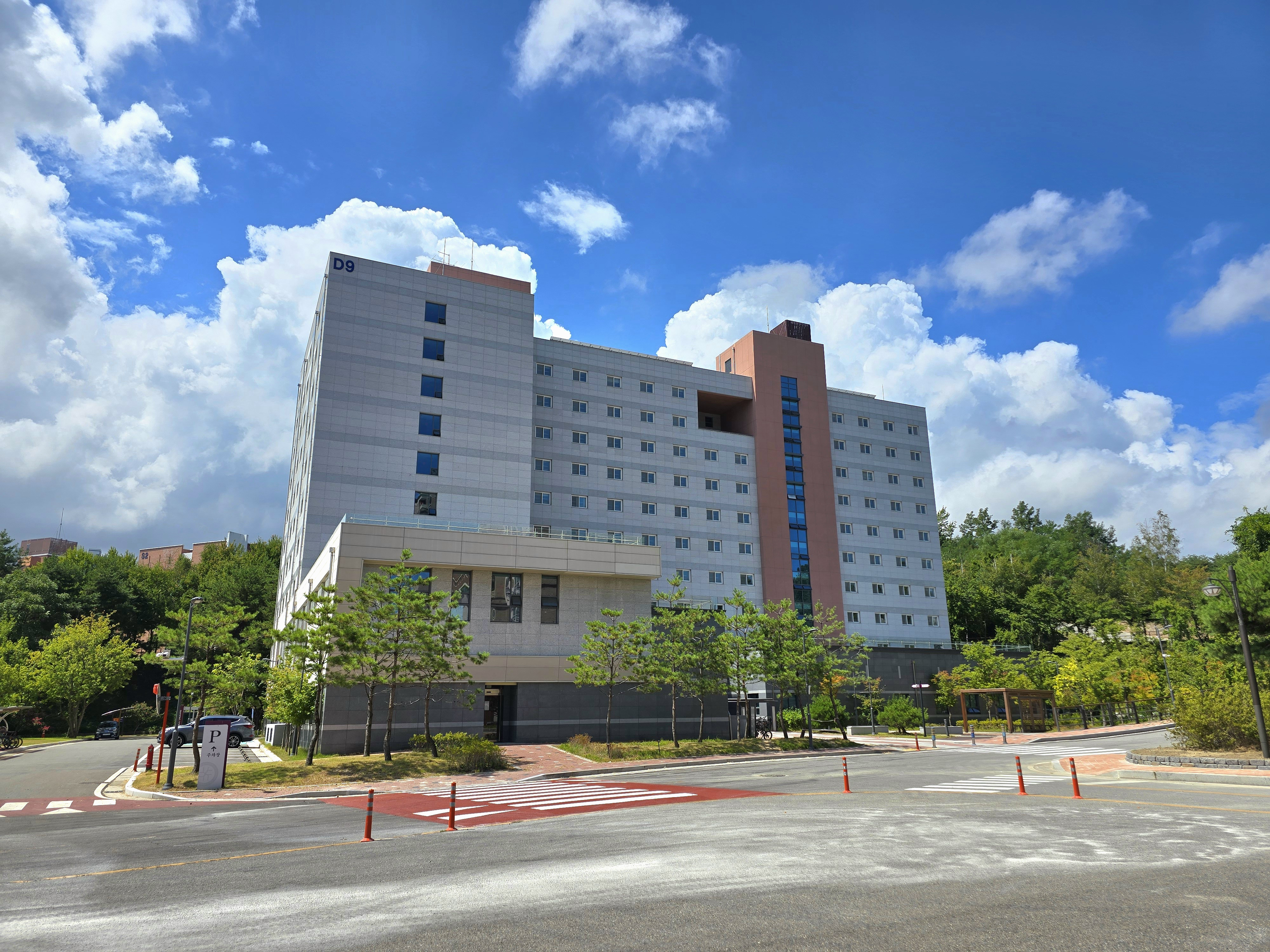
Gangneung–Wonju National University student dormitory

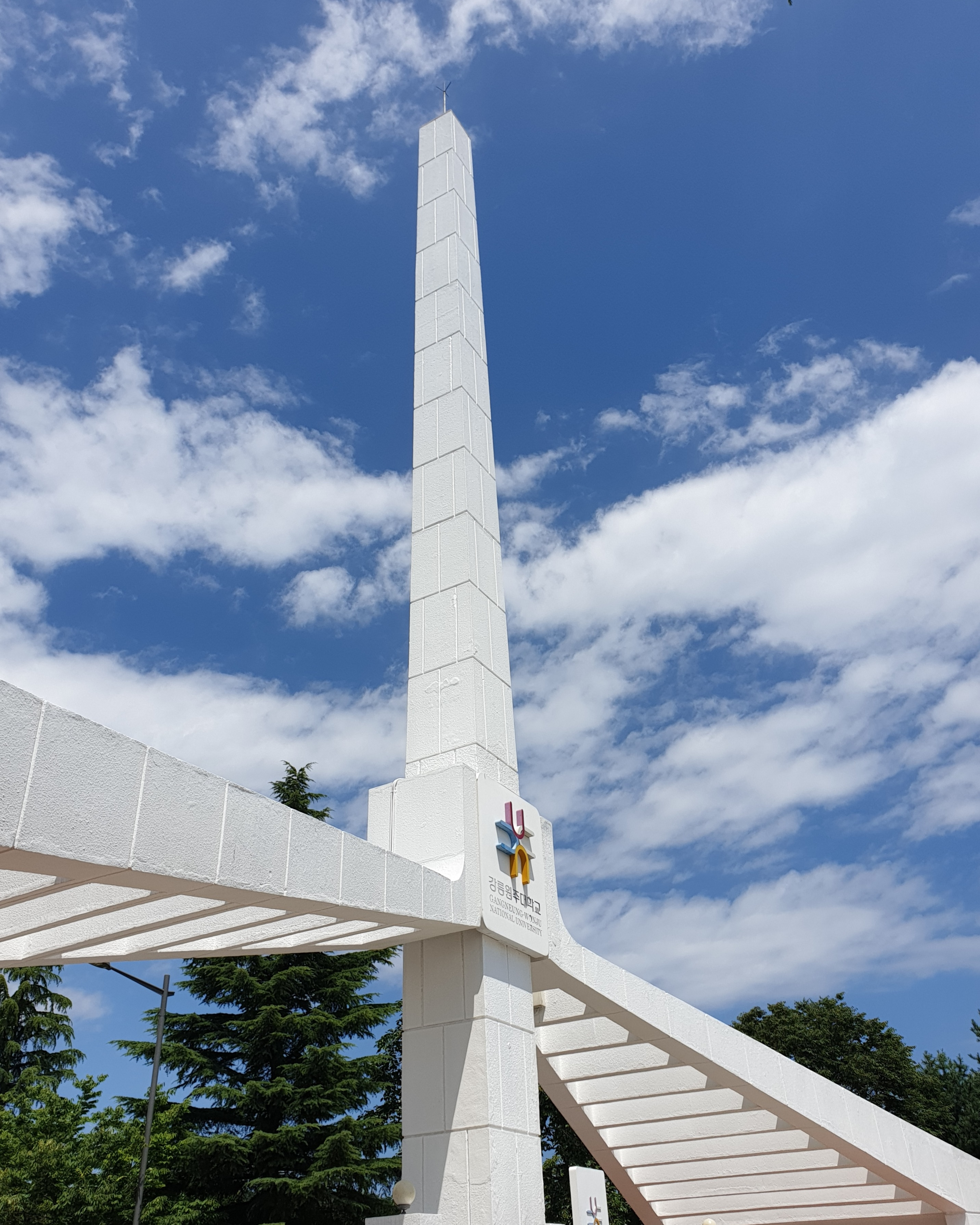
Old main gate of GWNU

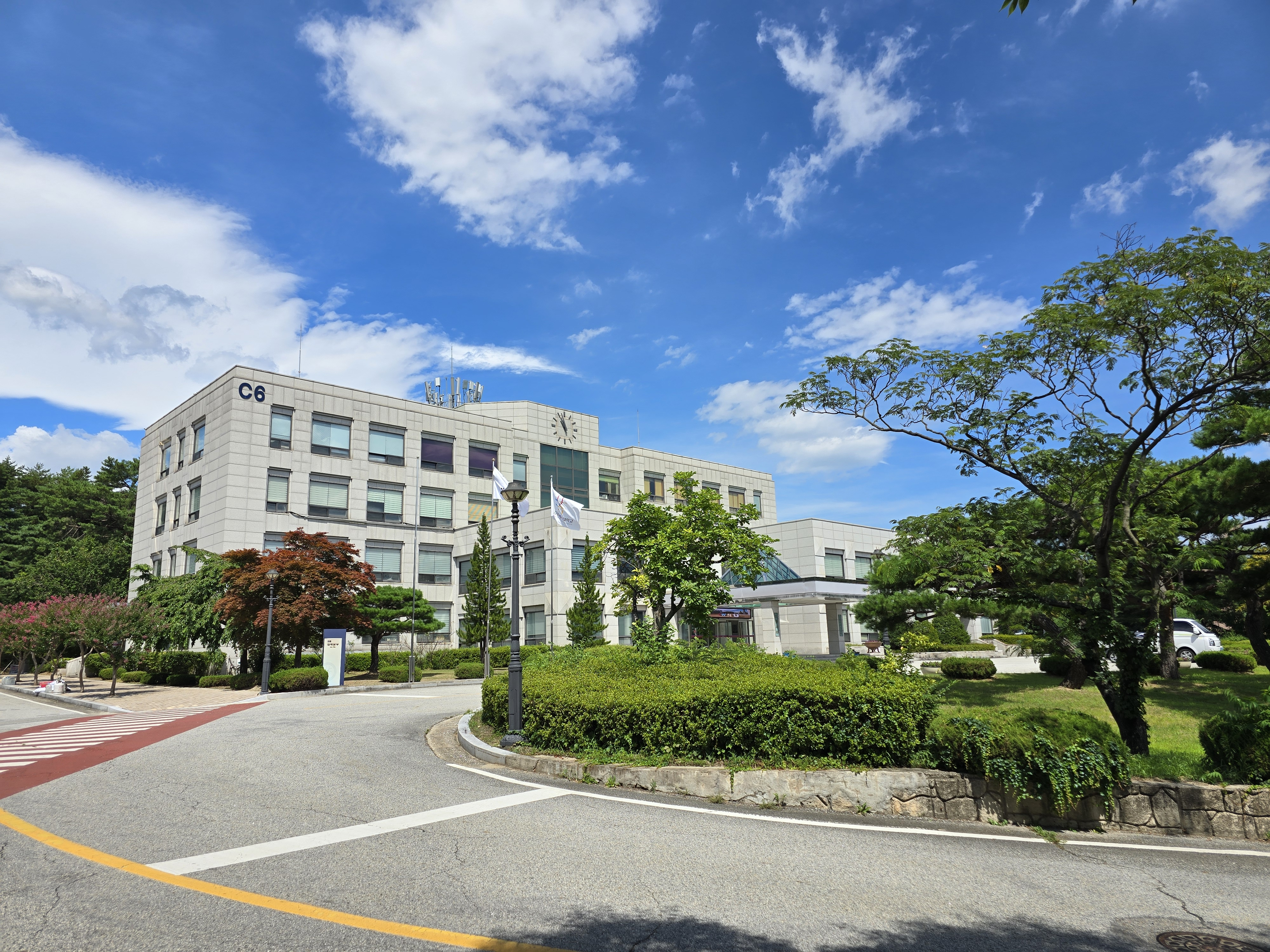
GWNU university headquarters

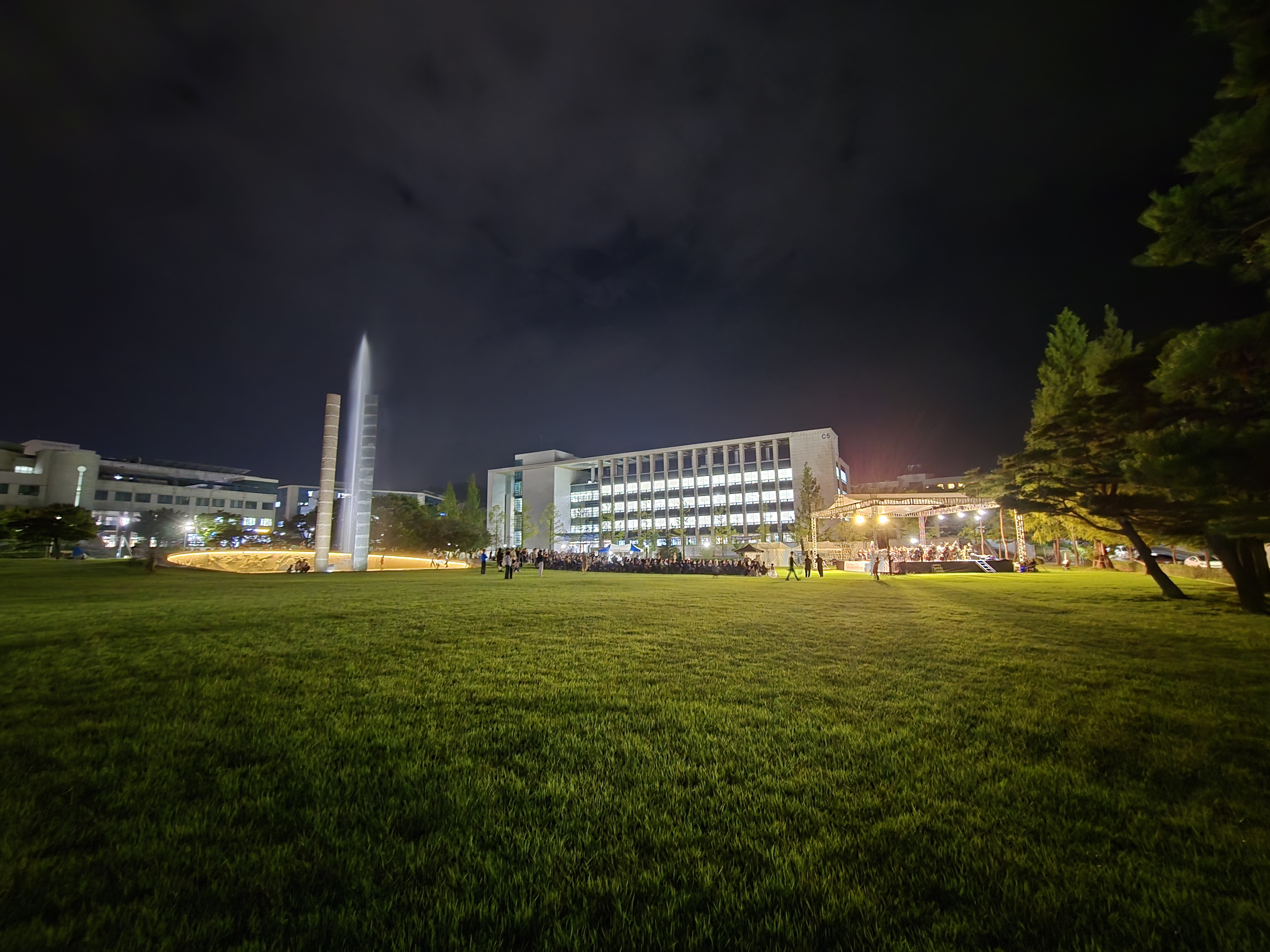
GWNU outreach concert, 2024

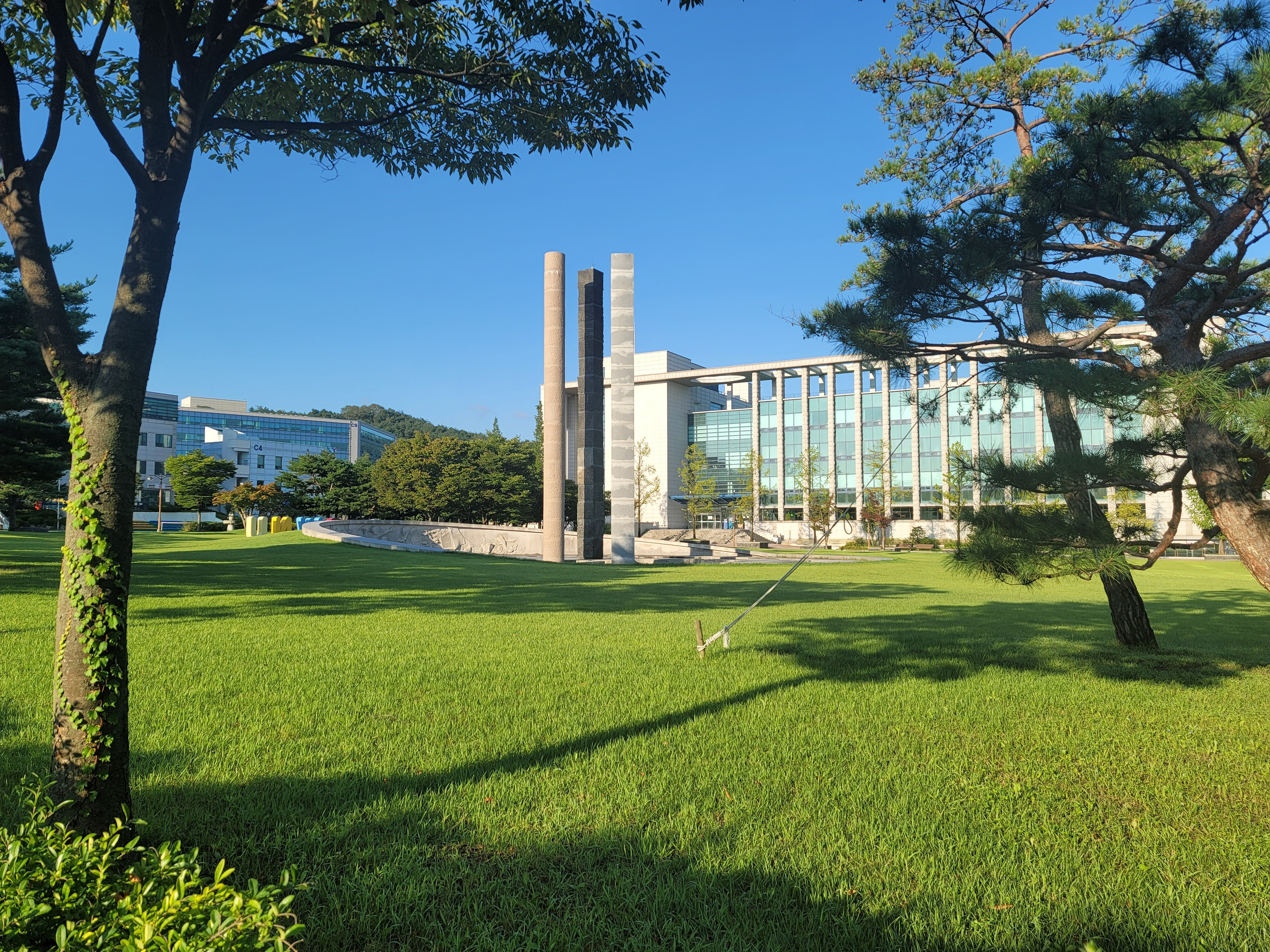
GWNU central library and university symbol tower

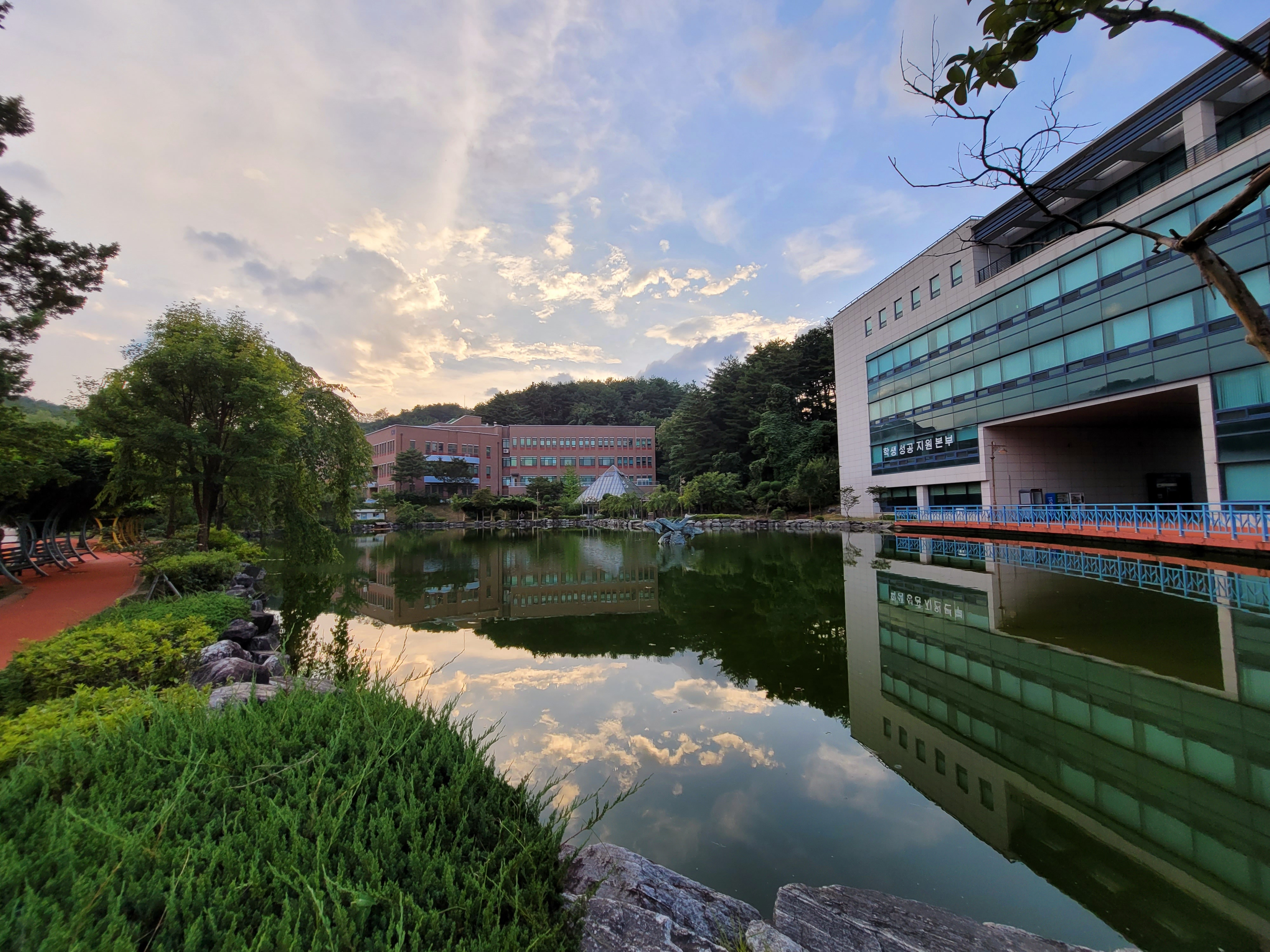
Haeramji

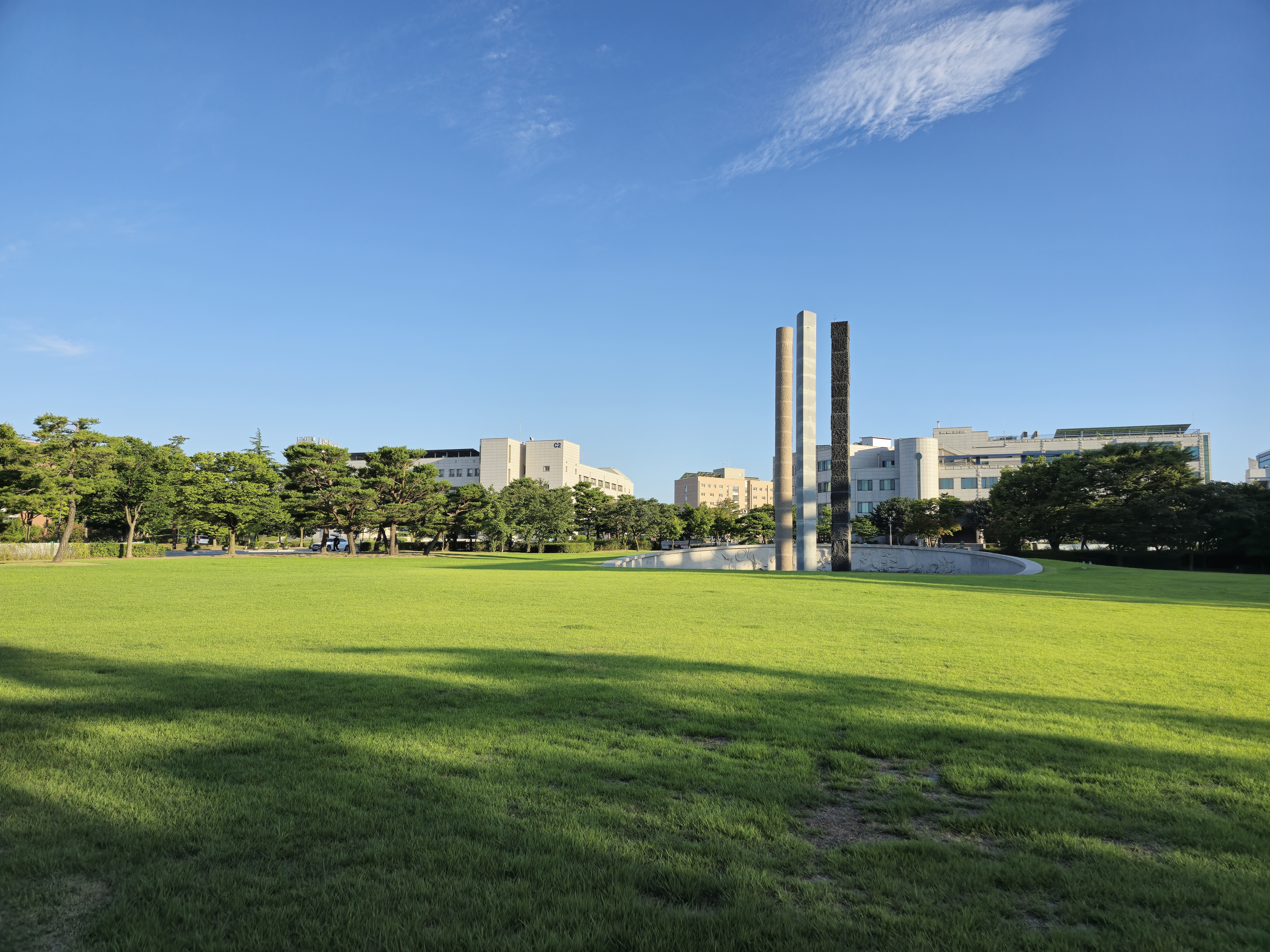
Haeram-in's Cham-tteul

GWNU's main stadium

== See also ==
- List of national universities in South Korea
- List of universities and colleges in South Korea
- Education in South Korea
