= Test of Legal Ethics =

South Korean legal test

The Test of Legal Ethics (Korean: 법조윤리시험; Hanja: 法曹倫理試驗) is a 40-question, seventy-minute, multiple-choice examination required in South Korea. There are 40 scored questions. The test is developed and administered by the Ministry of Justice. The test's purpose in asking questions pertaining to disciplinary measures is to ascertain knowledge of the relevant rules and regulations. It is not a test of an individual's personal ethical values.

== Passing score ==
The passing score is 70% correct (28 questions) out of 40 questions.

== See also ==
- Legal Education Eligibility Test
- MPRE
