= Chonnam National University Law School =

Law school in Gwangju, South Korea

Coordinates: 35.17413°N 126.90268°E

- Motto: Truth, Creativity, Dedication
- Type: National law school
- Established: 2009
- Dean: Byungro Min
- Address: Yongbong-ro 77, Buk-gu, Gwangju, South Korea
- Website: lawschool.jnu.ac.kr

Chonnam National University Law School is a national law school in Gwangju, South Korea.

Since it was founded in 1954, the school has produced a myriad of lawyers who have contributed to establishing justice in Korea. After setting up an approved three-year JD program in 2008 under the newly introduced law school system, the school is now one of the largest and each JD class enrolls approximately 120 students.

Hankyung Business Magazine has recently ranked Chonnam National Law 9th among top law schools in Korea in 2017.

== History ==
- February 1954 - Permitted to establish College of Law (Dept of Law & Dept of Public Administration)
- April 1981 - Established legal clinic
- July 1996 - Established Law Library
- August 2008 - Officially approved to establish a three-year JD program with an incoming class of 120 students
- March 2009 - Opened CNU Law School. Abolished College of Law, Transferred Dept of Public Administration to College of Social Science
- February 2010 - Entered into Academic Cooperation Agreement with University of Kansas, School of Law in the U.S.A.
- January 2011 - Entered into Academic Cooperation Agreement with Keio University School of Law in Japan

== Programs ==
CNU Law School specializes in public interest law and corporate law.

== Alumni ==
There have been a number of judges from the school, such as Manun Bae, Justice of the Supreme Court of Korea, and Yanggyun Kim, Justice of the Constitutional Court of Korea. Apart from that, it has also produced a myriad of congressmen like Eunhui Gwon, Yungeun Woo, Choi Jae-cheon, and so on.
