= Jeongwan yeu =

Bias issue in the South Korean legal system

- Hangul: 전관예우
- Hanja: 前官禮遇
- RR: jeongwannyeu
- MR: chŏn'gwannyeu

Jeongwan yeu refers to an informal arrangement in the South Korean legal system whereby retired judges and public prosecutors who go on to become lawyers in private practise receive special treatment from their incumbent former colleagues. A paper from the Korea Institute of Public Administration describes it as one of the four major problems caused by the way in which South Korea appoints judicial officers. The term may also be used more broadly to refer to preferential treatment for retired regulators who go on to take private-sector jobs in the industries which they were previously responsible for regulating, a form of regulatory capture.

It is variously translated into English as:

- "privileges of former post"
- "allowing privileges associated with one's former post"
- "special consideration to former judges and prosecutors"
- "honorable treatment to retired colleagues"

== Roots ==
Jeongwan yeu is said to be a result of South Korea's system of legal education and appointment of judges. All law students who pass the bar examination (formerly limited to 300 students, though the cutoff was raised to 1,000 in the early 2000s) attend a two-year course at the Judicial Training Research Institute before being considered for appointment as a judge or public prosecutor; this training offers them the opportunity to develop close bonds with one another. Those who are not appointed have the option of becoming defense attorneys, or pursuing other professions. Judges and public prosecutors are thus appointed to their positions at a young age, and many retire early, in their 40s and 50s, in order to work as private attorneys.

== Effects ==
The exact nature of the "special consideration" may vary. Prosecutors and judges, for their part deny that there is any impropriety at all. However, as stated by the Doosan Encyclopedia, the practice may extend as far as former judges and prosecutors being given a favourable ruling at their first trial in private practice, regardless of its merits. Because of the perception that it will offer them an advantage in their cases, clients thus prefer to engage the services of defense attorneys who have previously served as judges or public prosecutors. Judges-turned-lawyers are thus able to command much higher fees than their competitors. These factors have resulted in "deep-rooted distrust in the criminal justice system" by the public.

In 2003, a Supreme Court of Korea spokesperson admitted that cases taken up by former Supreme Court officials had a far lower rate of dismissal than cases in general. In a 2006 article about the jeongwan yeu phenomenon, South Korean newspaper Hankyoreh reported that of 32 former Supreme Court judges who had retired since 1990, 29 had since gone into private practice, indicating the potential extent of the phenomenon. The group of retired judges as a whole exhibited an unusually high acceptance rate for their cases of 63.2%, among whom the two highest were Yi Don-hoe at 94.3% and Song Jin-hun at 92.7%. A 2008 statistical analysis of the problem in the Hankook Ilbo, centred on seven former Supreme Court judges who retired in 2005 to take up private practice, found that from July 2006 to June 2008, only 26% of their 225 civil cases which went before the Supreme Court were dismissed, in comparison to an average rate of 58 to 63% for all lawyers. Below the Supreme Court, the ratio of former District Court officials who took on district court criminal cases from 2004 to 2006 (as a proportion of all lawyers appearing before the district court) ranged from a high of 100% (18 out of 18) in Suwon, to a low of 32% (9 out of 28) in Cheongju; eight out of the nine top-ranking districts in this regard were in the Seoul National Capital Area.

== Suppression efforts ==
Efforts were made as early as 1973 to control the issue of jeongwan yeu, by placing limits on the ability of retired prosecutors and judges to open their own law firms. Following the Uijeongbu scandal in 1997, a law was proposed in 1998 specifying that a lawyer who was once a judge or a prosecutor must not serve as a lawyer within two years at criminal trials of a court of which he was a member directly before. The law did not pass the National Assembly due to pressure from the assembly's own Legal Affairs Committee as well as the legal profession at large; however, it was again proposed in 1999, and passed in January 2000. In December 2004, the Judicial Reform Commission proposed the creation of a voluntary central judicial ethics council as a means of controlling the problem. In March 2010, the Grand National Party proposed widening the restrictions, barring judges-turned-lawyers from taking cases in the entire region where they previously served as district judges for a period of one year.

== See also ==
- Old boy network
- Revolving door (politics)

== Sources ==
- Jang, Jun-o; Yi, Cheon-hyeon; Choe, Sun-yong (December 2007), 법관 임용방식의 발전 과정과 개선 방안 [Appointment method of legal officials: development process and plan for improvement] (PDF), Korea Institute of Public Administration, archived from the original (PDF) on 2011-07-22
- Park, Hyungkwan (April 2010), "The Basic Features of the First Korean Sentencing Guidelines", Federal Sentencing Reporter, 22 (4): 262–271, doi:10.1525/fsr.2010.22.4.262
  - Freely available draft version: Park, Hyungkwan (August 2009), "The Basic Features of the First Korean Sentencing Guidelines", Annual Conference of the National Association of Sentencing Commissions (PDF), Baltimore, Maryland, archived from the original (PDF) on 2011-07-20. Slides here. Note that the pagination differs significantly.
