= Daegu High School =

School in Daegu, South Korea

- Daegu; South Korea

Information
- Type: Public High school
- Established: 1958

Daegu High School is a Korean public high school in Camp Walker, Daegu, South Korea that was approved on 12 March 1958.
