= Sungkyunkwan University Law School =

Professional graduate school in Seoul, South Korea

Sungkyunkwan Law School is one of the professional graduate schools of Sungkyunkwan University, located in Seoul, South Korea. Founded in 2009, it is one of the founding law schools in South Korea and is one of the larger schools with each class in the three-year J.D. program having approximately 120 students.

== Partnerships ==
In 2024, Sungkyunkwan entered a student exchange partnership with Fordham University School of Law.

== Faculty ==
Cho Hee-dae

== Website ==
- Official Website
