= Yonsei Law School =

Law school in Seoul, South Korea

Coordinates: 37.5646°N 126.9369°E

Yonsei Law School (Korean: 연세대학교 법학전문대학원) is one of the professional graduate schools of Yonsei University, located in Seoul, South Korea.

As a member of SKY (universities), it is known as one of the top three law schools in Korea. The law school operates from Gwangbok Hall, which is located on Yonsei's Sinchon campus in Seoul.

== History ==
Yonsei Law School was established in 1950. It was formerly known as Yonsei University College of Law.

== Alumni ==
College of Law

- Park, Sang-ki, Former Minister of DOJ
- Yoon, Kwan, Former Chief Justice of SCOURT
- Roh, Gun-ho, Son of the Former President Roh, Moo-hyun

Law School

- Choi, Sooyeon, CEO of Naver Corporation
