= Kim Myeong-su =

Chief Justice of the Supreme Court of Korea

- 김명수
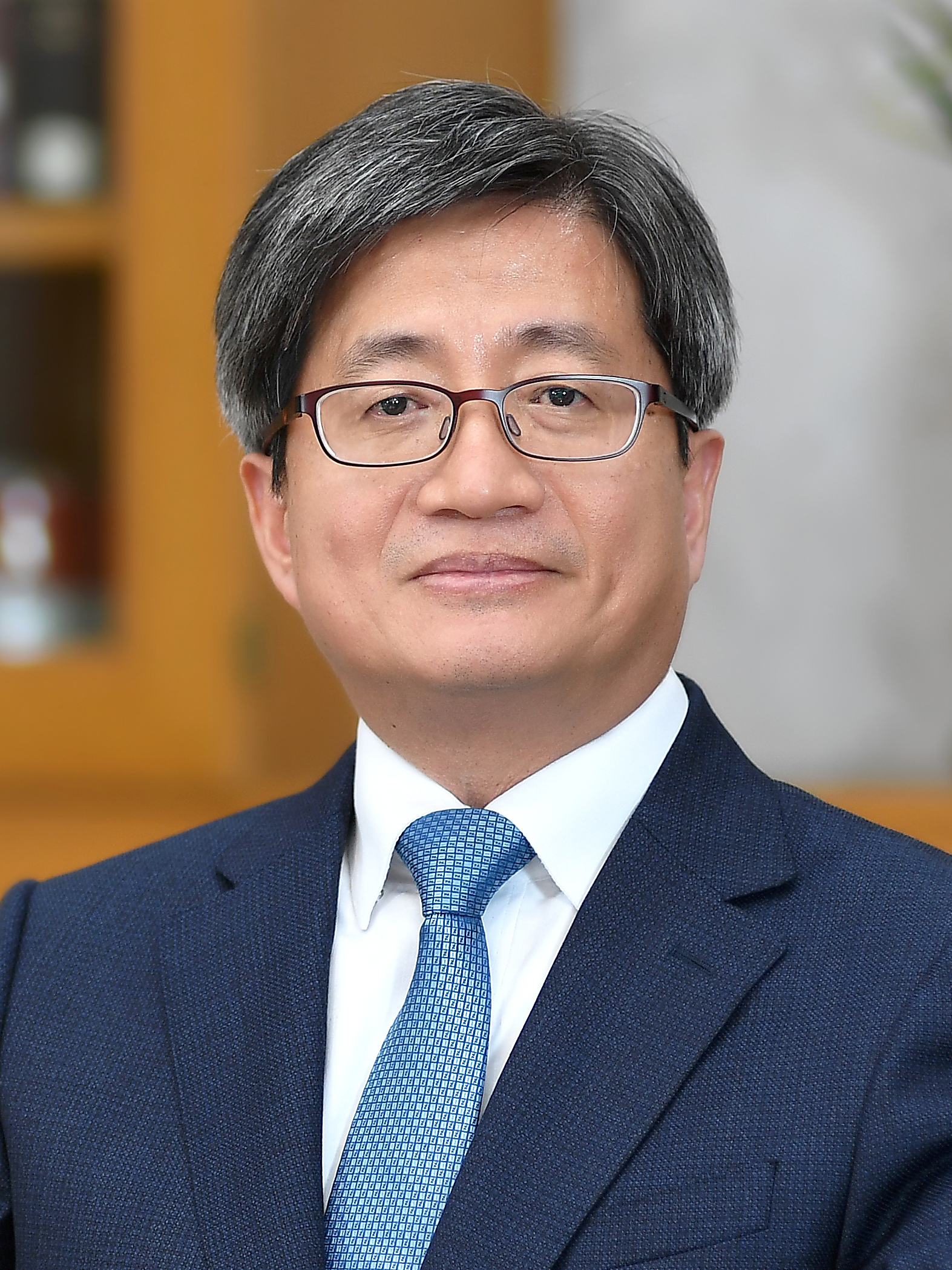
- Official portrait, 2017

16th Chief Justice of the Supreme Court of Korea
- In office 25 September 2017 – 24 September 2023
- Appointed by: Moon Jae-in
- Preceded by: Yang Sung-tae
- Succeeded by: Cho Hee-dae

Personal details
- Born: 12 October 1959 (age 66) Busan, South Korea
- Education: Seoul National University School of Law
- Occupation: Jurist

Kim Myeong-su (Korean: 김명수; Hanja: 金命洙; born 12 October 1959) is a South Korean jurist who served as the 16th Chief Justice of the Supreme Court of Korea from 2017 to 2023.

== Biography ==
Kim graduated from the Seoul National University School of Law in 1981, and passed the National Judicial Examination in 1983. He began his career at the Northern Branch Court of Seoul District Court in 1986. In February 2016, he was assigned as the Chief Judge of Chuncheon District. He began his 6-year term as Chief Justice on 25 September 2017, after his nomination was confirmed in a 160–134 vote of congressional approval.
