= Choi Jong-young =

South Korean judge (born 1939)

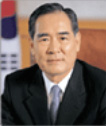
Choi Jong-young

Choi Jong-young is a South Korean judge who served as Chief Justice of the Supreme Court of Korea from 25 September 1999 to 24 September 2005 and Chairman of National Election Commission of South Korea from 1997 to 1999.

== Personal life ==
He was born in the year 1939 in Gangneung, Korea, Empire of Japan. In 1965, he became Judge of District Court of Busan and became Judge of Seoul High Court in 1981. In 1992, he became Justice of the Supreme Court of Korea and retired in 2006 as 13th Chief Justice of Korea.
