= Chief Justice of the Supreme Court of Korea =

Head of South Korean highest ordinary court

- 대한민국 대법원장 (Korean)
- Emblem of ordinary Courts of Korea

- Flag of ordinary Courts of Korea

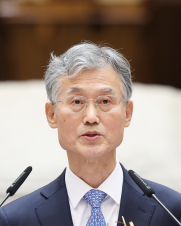
- Incumbent; Cho Hee-dae since 8 December 2023
- Supreme Court of Korea
- Style: Mr Chief Justice (informal); Your Honor (within the court)
- Status: Chief Justice
- Member of: Council of Supreme Court Justices
- Residence: Daebeobwonjang Gonggwan
- Seat: Seoul, South Korea
- Appointer: President (Subject to the National Assembly's approval)
- Term length: Six years, non renewable, Mandatory retirement at age 70
- Constituting instrument: Constitution of South Korea
- Inaugural holder: Kim Byung-ro
- Formation: 5 August 1948; 78 years ago
- Website: Official english website

The chief justice of the Supreme Court of Korea (Korean: 대법원장; Hanja: 大法院長; RR: Daebeobwonjang) is the chief judge of the Supreme Court of Korea. As presiding judge of the grand bench composed of two-thirds of fourteen Supreme Court justices, the chief represents the Supreme Court of Korea. The chief justice is regarded as one of two equivalent heads of judicial branch in Government of South Korea. Another head is the president of the Constitutional Court of Korea. The current chief justice of the Supreme Court of Korea is Cho Hee-dae who was appointed by Yoon Suk Yeol after his first nominee was rejected by the National Assembly.

== Appointment and tenure ==
Under chapter 5, article 104(1) of Constitution, and article 12(1) of Court Organization Act, the chief justice is appointed by the president of South Korea with the consent of the National Assembly of South Korea.

While article 105(1) of Constitution sets term length of the chief justice as non-renewable single term of six-years, its mandatory age of retirement is delegated to sub-constitutional regulation by article 105(4) of Constitution. Currently, the chief justice's mandatory age of retirement is 70 by article 45(4) of Court Organization Act.

== Powers and duties ==
As head member of the Supreme Court of Korea, the chief justice's formal main role is participating in decision of the Court as one of Supreme Court justices. However, since most of cases in the Court are handled by three different panels or 'petty benches'(Korean: 소부) each of consisting four Supreme Court justices except the chief justice, the chief cannot participate in ruling of daily cases. Rather, the chief justice only participates in 'crand bench(Korean: 전원합의체)' convened with more than two-thirds of all fourteen Justices, as presiding judge.

A more substantial role of the chief justice is governing political and administrative tasks in ordinary courts, as the chief is head of hierarchy of conventional judiciary consisted of all ordinary courts in South Korea.

- The chief recommends candidate for all other thirteen Supreme Court justices under article 104(2) of Constitution. Though all Supreme Court Justices are formally appointed by the President of South Korea with the consent of the National Assembly of South Korea, the chief's power to recommend candidate for each of Supreme Court Justices supports influence over composition of South Korean Supreme Court.
- The chief nominates candidate for three of nine Constitutional Court justices under article 111(3) of Constitution. Though all Constitutional Court justices are formally appointed by the president of South Korea, its nomination of candidate is usually reflected in final appointment by the president. Three of other six Constitutional Court justices are elected by National Assembly of South Korea. The left three are directly appointed by the President.
- The chief serves as the chair at Council of Supreme Court justices (Korean: 대법관회의) composed of all fourteen Supreme Court justices including the chief, who supervises administrative tasks in ordinary courts under article 16(1) and 17 of Court Organization Act. When a vote is a tie, the chief casts a vote.
- The chief appoints one of thirteen Supreme Court Justices as Minister of National Court Administration(Korean: 법원행정처), which is centralized organization to govern all matters on judicial administration of ordinary South Korean courts, under article 68(1) of Court Organization Act.
- The chief appoints every judge in the lower ordinary courts, with consent of the Council of Supreme Court Justices under article 104(3) of Constitution. Substantial power of this article is embodied by article 44(1) and 44-2(3) of Court Organization Act. Under article 44-2(3) of the act, the chief evaluates all judges in lower ordinary courts regularly and reflects it into personnel affairs of Judges, such as transferring judges from one lower court to other lower court (even against will of such judge), or declining renew of lower court Judge's 10-year term.
- The chief also appoints every law clerks and court officials (including the judicial assistant officer which has similar role as German Justizfachwirt) under article 53, 53-2 and 54 of the Court Organization Act.
- The chief can present written opinions to the National Assembly, on enacting or revising laws related to administration of ordinary courts, under article 9(3) of the Court Organization Act.

== List of chief justices ==
No.	Name	Tenure		Appointed by	Education
1	Kim Byung-ro	5 August 1948	14 December 1957	Rhee Syng-man	Nihon University
2	Cho Young-sun	9 June 1958	10 May 1960	Rhee Syng-man	Gyeongseong Law College
3	Cho Chin-man	30 June 1961	January 1964	Elected among Judges	Keijō Imperial University
4	Cho Chin-man	January 1964	19 October 1968	Park Chung Hee	Keijō Imperial University
5	Min Bok-ki	21 October 1968	March 1973	Park Chung Hee	Keijō Imperial University
6	Min Bok-ki	14 March 1973	21 December 1978	Park Chung Hee	Keijō Imperial University
7	Yi Young-sup	22 March 1979	15 April 1981	Park Chung Hee	Keijō Imperial University
8	Yoo Tai-heung	16 April 1981	15 April 1986	Chun Doo-hwan	Kansai University
9	Kim Yong-chul	16 April 1986	19 June 1988	Chun Doo-hwan	Seoul National University
10	Lee Il-kyu	6 July 1988	15 December 1990	Roh Tae-woo	Kansai University
11	Kim Deok-ju	16 December 1990	10 September 1993	Roh Tae-woo	Seoul National University
12	Yun Kwan	25 September 1993	24 September 1999	Kim Young-sam	Yonsei University
13	Choi Jong-young	25 September 1999	24 September 2005	Kim Dae-jung	Seoul National University
14	Lee Yong-hoon	25 September 2005	24 September 2011	Roh Moo-hyun	Seoul National University
15	Yang Sung-tae	25 September 2011	24 September 2017	Lee Myung-bak	Seoul National University
16	Kim Myeong-su	25 September 2017	24 September 2023	Moon Jae-in	Seoul National University
-	Ahn Chul-sang (Acting)	24 September 2023	7 December 2023	-	Konkuk University
17	Cho Hee-dae	8 December 2023	Incumbent	Yoon Suk-yeol	Seoul National University

== See also ==
- Constitutional Court of Korea
- Judiciary of South Korea
- Supreme Court of Korea
