= Yang Sung-tae =

Former Chief Justice of South Korean Supreme Court

- 양승태
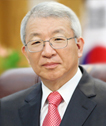

15th Chief Justice of the Supreme Court of Korea
- In office 25 September 2011 – 24 September 2017
- Nominated by: Lee Myung-bak
- Preceded by: Lee Yong-hoon
- Succeeded by: Kim Myeong-su

Personal details
- Born: 26 January 1948 (age 78) Miryang, South Korea
- Education: Seoul National University
- Occupation: Jurist, lecturer

Yang Sung-tae (Korean: 양승태; Hanja: 梁承泰; born 26 January 1948) is a South Korean jurist and the 15th Chief Justice of the Supreme Court of Korea.

== Early life and education ==
Born in Busan, Yang received a LL.B. from Seoul National University in 1970. He began his law career in 1975 as a judge of Seoul Civil District Court, and afterwards served as a judge in several nationwide courts. He also taught as a professor at the Judicial Research and Training Institute. He was later appointed as the Chief Judge of Busan District Court and Patent Court.

== Career ==
During the 1997 Asian financial crisis, Yang, as the senior presiding judge of the Bankruptcy Chambers of Seoul Central District Court, ordered court supervision of bankrupt companies based on fairness and transparency. As the Vice Minister of the National Court Administration, he played a role in reforming criminal procedure. In February 2005, he was named a Supreme Court Justice and served until February 2011. On September 25, 2011, he was inaugurated as the 15th Chief Justice of the Supreme Court of Korea. On September 24, 2017, his term as Chief Justice ended and a successor was named by President Moon Jae-in.

== Charges and arrest ==
By September 2018 his actions as chief justice were under investigation by the current chief justice. On January 24 he was arrested on the count of 40 charges including abuse of his authority as a judge as part of the political scandal that resulted in the impeachment of Park Geun-hye, the president of Korea during the time he was the chief justice.

Instead of Yang, a judge from a district court was appointed as the Chief Justice of the Supreme Court, and several civil lawsuits were detained in the process. The former Chief of Justice's actions increased skepticism about the independence of the judiciary.
