= Legal Education Eligibility Test =

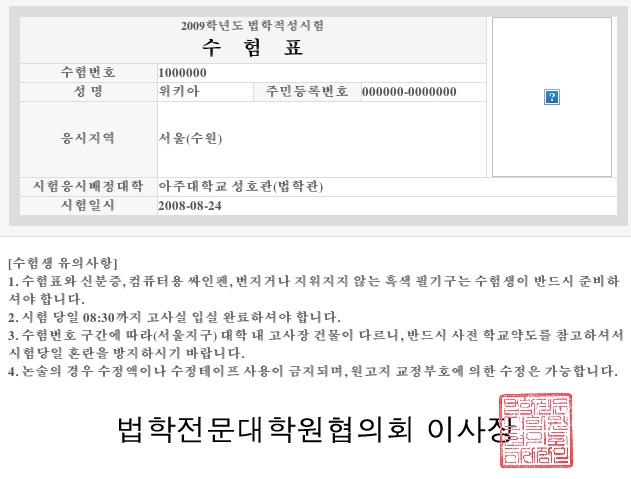
Examinee Admission Ticket for the LEET to be held on August 24, 2008.

The Legal Education Eligibility Test (LEET) is an examination which will be administered by the Korea Institute of Curriculum and Evaluation (KICE), intended to provide law schools in the Republic of Korea an evaluation metric to measure reading and reasoning skills required for successful legal education. The exam is similar in goal and content with the Public Service Aptitude Test (PSAT) administered as a part of the Korean civil service exams. The Law School Admission Test of the United States and Canada serves as the model for the test.

== Administration ==
KICE will administer the first LEET in 2018. KICE administers the LSAT once a year in August. The current bar exam will be in place for a few years.

== Test composition ==
The test currently has three 90-120 minute sections. Two are multiple choice sections and one section is a writing section.

=== Reading Comprehension ===
The section contains several Korean reading passages and questions pertaining to the main idea and structure.

=== Logical Reasoning ===
The section, like that of the LSAT contains questions that test the logical reasoning skills.

=== Writing ===
The format is not finalized yet.

== Preparation ==
Since the test is not yet administered, no preparation guide or course is available yet. The KICE is expected to release more information and sample exam later this year. No legal knowledge is required or tested in the LEET.

== Scoring ==
Not finalized yet.

== Latest Development ==
On January 24, 2008, the first model test will be held in Seoul. The model test is for research purpose and the score is not official. The first actual test will be held in August 2008.

== See also ==
- Legal Education
- Korean Bar Association
- Korea Institute of Curriculum and Evaluation
- Standardized testing
