= High courts of South Korea =

The high courts of South Korea (Korean: 고등법원) are intermediate appellate courts in South Korea's judicial system. They consist of six courts established in Busan, Daegu, Daejeon, Gwangju, Seoul, and Suwon that have jurisdiction to hear appeals from lower courts within their region.

== Jurisdiction ==
South Korea's high courts derive their jurisdiction from Article 28 of the Court Organization Act. They have jurisdiction to hear appeals from the rulings or judgments of three-judge panels from the district courts. They also have jurisdiction to hear appeals from the administrative court and three-judge panels of the family courts. Each of the high courts has jurisdiction over a specific region of South Korea.

== Composition ==
Each high court is headed by a chief justice and organized into civil, criminal, and special divisions with each division being led by a chief judge. The judges in each high court are organized into three-judge panels that exercise the court's authority. Judges are appointed by the chief justice of the Supreme Court with the approval of the Council of Supreme Court Justices for ten year terms. Presently, candidates for appointment to the judiciary must have at least seven years of legal experience and beginning on January 1, 2026, they must have at least ten years of experience. During their term of appointment, high court judges only serve on high courts and cannot be transferred to district courts.

== List of high courts ==
South Korea's six high courts and the lower courts they exercise appellate jurisdiction over are listed below:

Busan High Court

- Busan District Court
- Busan Family Court
- Busan Rehabilitation Court
- Changwon District Court
- Ulsan District Court
- Ulsan Family Court

Daegu High Court

- Daegu District Court
- Daegu Family Court

Daejeon High Court

- Cheongju District Court
- Daejeon District Court
- Daejeon Family Court

Gwangju High Court

- Gwangju District Court
- Gwangju Family Court
- Jeju District Court
- Jeonju District Court

Seoul High Court

- Chuncheon District Court
- Incheon District Court
- Incheon Family Court
- Seoul Administrative Court
- Seoul Central District Court
- Seoul Eastern District Court
- Seoul Family Court
- Seoul Northern District Court
- Seoul Rehabilitation Court
- Seoul Southern District Court
- Seoul Western District Court
- Uijeongbu District Court

Suwon High Court

- Suwon District Court
- Suwon Family Court
- Suwon Rehabilitation Court

== See also ==
- Constitutional Court of Korea
- Judiciary of South Korea
- Politics of South Korea
- Supreme Court of Korea
