= Chun Daeyup =

South Korean judge

- Chun in 2025

Justice of the Supreme Court of Korea
- Incumbent
- Assumed office May 8, 2021

Chairman of the National Election Commission
- Incumbent
- Assumed office February 2026

Personal details
- Born: February 6, 1964 (age 62) Busan, South Korea
- Education: Seoul National University

Chun Daeyup (Korean 천대엽; born February 6, 1964) is a South Korean judge. Chun is a Justice of the Supreme Court of Korea and the chairman of the National Election Commission. Chun was the 27th Minister of the National Court Administration and Chief Presiding Judge of the Seoul High Court.

== Early life ==
Chun was born on February 6, 1964, in Busan, South Korea. He graduated from Seoul National University's College of Law with a Bachelor of Law degree. Chun passed the National Judicial Exam in 1988, and became a judge of the Seoul Eastern District Court in March 1995.

== Career ==
Chun served in the Seoul District Court, Busan District Court, Seoul Eastern District Court, and the Busan High Court. He was a research judge for the Supreme Court of Korea. During his time as a research judge, Chun authored several works, co-authored a compendium on criminal court practices, and worked on commentaries on penal codes. Chun was Chief Presiding Judge of the Seoul High Court.

On May 1, 2021, chief justice Kim Myung-soo recommended Chun for the Supreme Court of Korea from a list of three candidates from the Supreme Court Justice Candidate Recommendation Committee. Chun was appointed as Justice of the Supreme Court of Korea on May 8, 2021. He replaced Justice Park Sang-ok after Park retired.

Chun was inaugurated as 27th Minister of the National Court Administration on January 15, 2024 in the Supreme Court of Korea´s Mugunghwa Hall. From January 2024 to January 2026, Chun was the Minister of the National Court Administration. In July 2026, Chun attended the Singapore International Arbitration Centre conference. In February 2026, Chun became chairman of the National Election Commission. He replaced Roh Tae-ak. In October 2026, Chun upheld the sentencing of Park Soon-kwan over the Hwaseong battery factory fire. Chun´s term in the Supreme Court of Korea will end in May 2027.
