= Providence (religious movement) =

Christian new religious movement

Christian Gospel Mission 기독교복음선교회 Providence
- Abbreviation: CGM
- Classification: Christian new religious movement
- Head Pastor: Jung Myung-seok
- Headquarters: Wolmyeongdong
- Founder: Jung Myung-seok
- Origin: 1980; Seoul, South Korea
- Separated from: Unification movement Methodism
- Other names: Setsuri; Bright Moon Church; Morning Star Church; Jesus Morning Star (JMS)
- Official website: cgm.or.kr

- Christian Gospel Mission
- Hangul: 기독교복음선교회
- Hanja: 基督敎福音宣敎會
- Revised Romanization: gidokgyobogeumseongyohoe
- McCune–Reischauer: kidokkyobogŭmsŏn'gyohoe

Providence (officially Christian Gospel Mission; Korean: 기독교복음선교회), better known as JMS (acronym of Jesus Morning Star), is a Christian new religious movement founded by Jung Myung-seok in 1980 and headquartered in Wol Myeong-dong, South Korea. Providence has been widely referred to by international media as a cult.

In April 2009, the leader Jung Myung-seok (also transliterated as Jeong Myeong-seok) was convicted of rape by the Supreme Court of Korea and was sentenced to 10 years imprisonment. Jung was released on 18 February 2018. Following Jung's release from prison, the Korea Post reported that the Providence faith movement had reached more than 70 countries. However, Jung would again be indicted on rape in October 2022 and sentenced by the Supreme Court of in January 2025 to 17 years imprisonment.

Providence has also been called Setsuri (Japanese: 摂理), International Christian Association (ICA; 국제크리스천연합), the Morning Star Church (MS Church), the Bright Moon Church, and Ae-chun Church (애천교회; 愛天敎會).

== History ==
In the 1970s, Jung was a member of the Unification Church (UC), whose teaching his resembles. In 1980, Jung founded the Ae-chun Church (애천교회), which was affiliated with the Methodist Church. In 1983, Jung Myung-seok forged a diploma from the Korea Bible Correspondence School and joined the Jesus Korea Methodist Church, changing its name to Jesus Korea Methodist Aechun Church. In the same year, he launched the World Youth University MS Union and called himself JESUS MORNING STAR (JMS).

The name was changed to the International Christian Association (국제크리스천연합) in the mid-1980s. A rift occurred in the group in 1986, when the vice president of Providence attempted to act on the sex scandals surrounding the group, but he was shut out of the organizational system and Jung consolidated all power around himself.

In October 1999 the organization changed its name to Christian Gospel Mission (기독교복음선교회).

== Theology ==
Jung Myung Seok set up Providence in 1980 as a breakaway sect from the UC. Providence's core teaching are found in a series of unpublished precepts called the 30 Lessons, (Note: First 12 lessons are considered introductory and elementary levels, 13–20 intermediate, and 21–30 advanced.(Sakurai 2007c, p. 5)) which bear considerable resemblance to the "Divine Principle" of the Unification movement, which are partly inspired by teachings of Kim Baek-moon, including his book The Fundamental Principles of Christianity (基督教根本原理 drafted March 2, 1946, published March 2, 1958). According to Tahk Myeong-hwan, nine of the 30 lessons exhibit a "considerable level of resemblance" with the Divine Principle. The lessons are based on a numerological interpretation which identifies the sect's leader as the Second Coming of Christ.

One lesson implies that those who do not "meet" him will not go to Heaven; another that any who betray him are committing a grave crime. During the instruction of the advanced level of the 30 Lessons, it is taught that Jung is the Messiah, proven through the numerological interpretation of prophesied dates and times in the book of Daniel, although more recent statements from a representative seems to contradict this claim.

Like the UC, Providence preaches the advent of the "Complete Testament Era" (Hanja: 成約時代). Providence furthermore allegorize the relationship between God and man to that between the groom and bride, or two lovers. While both UC and Providence teach that original sin was caused by Eve's intercourse with the fallen angel, who turned into Satan. Providence teaches this can be redeemed by having sex with Jung Myung-seok. (Note: Also stated by Jo Gyeong-suk, former head of the Seoul Branch of Providence, and allegedly a victim herself.) Jung was found to have forced female followers to have sex with him "as a religious behaviour meant to save their souls" in the Korean Court of Law. (Note: Supreme Court of Korea civil suit ruling, January 2008) Former members have stated or testified that young and attractive women were presented to Jung as "sexual gifts", with whom he coercively engaged in sexual acts, which was explained to them as a purification rite. (Note: Seoul Central District Court, criminal trial, 2008. And statements reported in media, 2007.)

Although some of the teachings are a carefully guarded secret within the sect, scholars such as Yoshihide Sakurai who analyzed and summarized the sect's beliefs relied on documented testimonies as well as interviews with ex-members that included victims. He obtained notes from ex-members which were used in the "bible study", as instructions in the 30 lessons were conventionally called within the sect.

== Recruitment ==
Initiates into the sect are initially approached by being invited into an "activity circle", i.e., sports or music clubs in school. The inductees learn only later when taken to "bible study" that religion constitutes part of the "circle" activity. In this manner, Providence forms non-religious organisations for the purpose of attracting young people without initially revealing the religious nature of the group or their real motives, (Note: Asahi Shimbun′s article on July 27, 2006 was followed up by similar coverage in this editorial, issued bilingually: 教団のワナにはまるな [Don't get caught in the religious group's trap]. Asahi Shimbun (in English and Japanese). August 18, 2006. Archived from the original on October 6, 2014. "The gimmicks the sect uses to increase its membership are nothing new. At university campuses, the sect's recruiters first approach students under the guise of a sports or cultural circle. After building close personal relationships with these students, the members reveal the religious nature of their group and start indoctrinating them. The favorite targets are serious-minded young people who feel alienated from their families and schools and wish to change their lives.") a practice ruled "fraudulent" under law by the Japanese Supreme Court. (Note: Front groups for Providence/Christian Gospel Mission include: Bright Smile Movement (BSM), China Christian Youth Association (CCYA), Global Association of Culture and Peace (GACP), International Cultural Exchange (ICE), International Culture Interchange Association (ICIA), IOCA, IOCA Modeling, Korean International Cultural Society (KICS), Peace Model Korea (PMK), Peace Model USA (PMUSA), Providence Vision Project (PVP), Sky Soccer, United Culture and Arts Network (UCAN), VIA 3, World Peace Model, Youth Developer Group (YDG))

== Outside of Korea ==
Christian Gospel Mission is proselytizing under different names in different regions. Providence or Providence Church in Europe and the US, Setsuri (摂理, Japanese for "providence") in Japan, the Bright Moon Church, the Morning Star Church, and Jesus Morning Star (JMS). Each church branch that follows Jung's teaching keeps its own name (e.g. Nak-seong-dae Church, Seoul Church, etc.). While leader Jung Myung Seok was on the run since 1999, due to sexual assault exposes and civil lawsuits filed in South Korea, Japan and Taiwan, Providence, then known mostly as JMS, continued publishing Jung's sermons online, providing telephone counseling and holding overseas events for their followers. During his incarceration between 2008 and 2018, Jung's sermons and directives were delivered through visitors to the prison and through his successor Kim Ji Seon.

=== Australia ===
Providence began operating in Australia during 1997. Members of Providence have reported to be actively recruiting for new members at the Australian National University. In April 2014, the Australian government-funded television network Special Broadcasting Service reported on their activities in Australia, including statements by former members that they sought young attractive women. Providence refused numerous requests for a spokesperson to be interviewed for the program in Australia and Korea. The organization's Chief of External Affairs denied in writing to answer specific questions about the group's Australian activities. He stated that it had charitable status for tax purposes.

In May 2016, Australian magazine Crikey revealed that an Australian Taxation Office (ATO) employee had been whitewashing the Wikipedia article on Providence. Operating from a work computer since August 2015, the lawyer had removed negative press coverage from the article and inserted glowing praise of Jung, while casting doubt on Jung's prison conviction. The woman, who denied it at first, eventually admitted that she had made the edits. The ATO's Fraud Prevention and Internal Investigations Unit declined to take any action.

Seven News Australia reported in 2023 that two Australian women had been recruited and trafficked to South Korea where JMS members allegedly raped them. Maria Naselli, President of the Lord's Hope Church of Providence in Sydney sent a video to Seven News stating "We want you to stop attacking us and to stop taking actions against us. If you do not heed this strong warning, we will hold a press conference against you".

In 2025, Australian former member Liz Cameron published a book about her experiences in Providence entitled Cult Bride: How I Was Brainwashed and How I Broke Free. She also shared her story on the ABC podcast and radio program Conversations.

=== Hong Kong ===
Providence has been reported on in Hong Kong, where it is known as The Bright Moon Church (月明教會) or Setsuri (攝理教). In October 2006 a former member told Oriental Daily News that it has about 100 core members in Hong Kong, including many medical graduates and some assistant professors. Though it has been in Hong Kong for years, its slow development kept it fairly unknown until its media exposure. Providence temporarily created an organization to run various community activities, known as the United Culture and Arts Network (UCAN).

=== Japan ===
Providence became active in Japan around 1985 or 1987. In 2006 the national newspaper Asahi Shimbun reported that Providence is "causing serious social problems in Japan", labeling it as a "cult" and "sect". It also reported that the organization was pressuring members to live together, make regular donations, marry within the organization, and follow the strict guidance of its founder.

It has been reported that Providence, commonly referred to as Setsuri in Japan, hides their religious affiliation at a Japanese university and solicited students as cultural clubs, specifically targeting students pursuing medical or legal professions and those who are interested in environmental issues, sustainable development goals and international contributions. The movement is also known to recruit tall, fair-skinned and glamorous university students. It uses social media and student/workplace mentorship networking events to draw new members. It was estimated that the movement has increased its membership from about 2,000 to more than 6,000 followers in Japan between 2006 and 2022.

The group's church usually consisted of a single apartment room, where their religious studies occurred. Sometimes the church was where some of the faithful cohabited. There were some 40 such churches across Japanese cities as of 2006. Members as students working part-time jobs were expected to contribute a minimum of ¥1,000 at weekly church service, and as full-salaried wage-earners, monthly tithes and bonus-time donations. Believers were instructed to live frugally on cheap food and never indulge in alcohol. They were forbidden from dating, but at a suitable time married within the group in mass ceremonies.

Although the Supreme Court of Japan in 1996 ruled Blessing ceremony of the Unification Church was invalid, more than 300 Japanese members of Providence were wed in six mass ceremonies held between 1996 and 2006 modeled on the UC. While being wanted on rape charges, Jung at a July 2003 mass wedding urged the couples via a big-screen Internet connection to have babies to increase the number of Providence members.

In 2007, Japanese Police raided eight Providence facilities in Chiba on suspicion that a senior member illegally obtained residence status. They also searched a facility in the city's Chuo Ward. The senior member, a Korean, was arrested for overstaying her visa. It was learned that Providence recruited "high class, high income" men and selected women for "style and looks".

As of 2008, it has been said that over 100 women have fallen victim of Jung's sexual transgressions in Japan alone.

=== New Zealand ===
The New Zealand Herald reported that Providence is recruiting young women in universities, shopping centres and churches. The University of Auckland issued a warning to student groups, and a parent support group for those whose children have been recruited or impacted was established. The Presbyterian Church of Auckland stated that its members are also being targeted. A 22-year-old University of Auckland student said that while a member she participated in photoshoots, fashion shows, and a Bible study course which introduced Jung as the new messiah. A Providence leader was approached for comment, but failed to turn up to a meeting with Herald staff.

=== Taiwan ===
Providence's earliest activity in Taiwan was in 1988. It is commonly known as Jesus Morning Star Church (JMS), (Chinese: 晨星會; Hanyu Pinyin: chéngxīng huì; Tongyong Pinyin: chéeng sīn hùei, 攝理教 or 攝禮教; shè lǐ jìao). Providence itself rejects these common names, officially registered as China Christian Youth Association (CCYA; 中華基督教新時代青年會), and sometimes calls itself Providence Church (攝理教會).

In November 2001 the Taiwanese version of Next Magazine published the article "Korean cult leader raped over one hundred Taiwanese female college students". Allegedly involved National Taiwan University, Fu Jen Catholic University, and National Chengchi University all denied the report, stated that there were no cult activities in their campuses at the time. NCCU acknowledged that there had been such activities many years ago. There had been similar reports in 1997. Taiwanese authorities investigated Jung for raping women, but he fled the country. Members of EXODUS soon came to Taiwan and held a press conference with an involved woman.

In October 2005 Apple Daily reported that many student clubs in National Central University and other campuses are recruiting for Providence Church. These clubs hold a wide variety of activities including the "Eagle Cup" soccer tournament in Taipei city and regular model training. The paper quoted an undisclosed former church member, that the church's "modeling department" is in fact a channel of recruiting sexual partners for Jung. The paper obtained three audio recordings of dialogs of some female members, which say that Jung have had sex with ten female members by mutual consent, most of them college students from the modeling department.

In November 2024, JMS conducted the "13th Blessing Ceremony (Wedding)" for Taiwanese followers, during which concerns were raised about the excessive invasion of privacy. Specifically, the organization reportedly asked participants intrusive questions, including inquiries about the frequency of sexual relations.

== Sexual abuse allegations in the media ==
=== Media exposes ===
The Providence sex scandal received wide public attention following Seoul Broadcasting System (SBS)'s exposé, broadcast in March 1999, on its TV news magazine The Unanswered. Over 100 alleged victims were contacted for information in the making of this series. (Note: According to the SBS producer Nam Sang-mun, who later contributed articles in newspaper on the matter.) JMS, as Providence was known then, countered with lawsuits to suppress the broadcast, libel litigation, and an organized two-month barrage of phone calls, as many as 60,000 calls per day.

The broadcast resulted in Jung fleeing the country one day later. Jung lived freely outside of Korea for the next seven years, until apprehended by the Chinese authorities in 2006, and repatriated to Korea in 2007.

Sexual abuse allegation continued to surface against Jung overseas, in Hong Kong, China, Taiwan, Japan, and other locations. The news show The Unanswered followed with additional episodes covering Jung's activities abroad. (Note: The March 20, 1999, broadcast was followed up by a May 29, 1999, broadcast that contained an airing of Providence's views. The news show then ran a sequel on July 24, 1999. It aired another report on Providence in November 2002) (Note: The SBS news show broadcast on May 29, 1999, a segment where JMS (Providence) expressed its views. Providence then began to publicize it had gotten SBS to retract. The SBS news show then aired a sequel on July 24, 1999, to rebut Providence and to report on Jung living overseas.) In one episode, SBS reported how female members of Providence had been flown to and held against their will at Jung's hideout in Anshan in the Chinese province Liaoning on the border to Korea. One 28-year-old Korean, who in April 2005 managed to escape, confided how she was sexually violated multiple times by Jung. (Note: This was also reported by the Sisa Journal)

In Japan, there were 2,000 Providence members as of 2006, almost entirely students and graduates of prestigious colleges, and 60% women. During his sojourns in Japan, Jung summoned upwards of 10 women on an almost daily basis, and under the false pretext of running a "health check" would have improper sexual encounters with them. (Note: According to former members.) Jung's aides are said to have imposed strict secrecy of these encounters with Jung, threatening the women with condemnation to hell if they told anyone what he had done.

In Taiwan too, similar incidents have been reported, where many female members of his organization were ordered to undress for a "health check", be subjected various forms of sexual abuse, including having sex with him to wipe off their sins.

The anti-Providence group EXODUS (founded in 1999) held a press conference in April 2006, in which four unidentified women wearing bucket hats and surgical masks covering their faces, accused Jung of organized sex crimes against themselves and other women, who required medical treatment.

Jung denied the charges, his followers said. In 2008, in response to the rape allegations, Providence pastor Bae Jae-yong said that it was a "distorted rumor that was created by the people who have slandered [Jung]" and that "all fundamental truth will be clarified by [Jung] at the prosecutor's office".

According to allegations by ex-Providence members, as of 2012, some 500 to over 1,000 women members were still being groomed for future sexual exploitation by Jung. Known internally as the "Evergreens" (상록수; 常緑樹; sang-rok-su), these female members are said to comprise a "reserve corps" for "sex bribes" (성상납; 性上納; seong sangnap), a term for sexual favors accorded to those exercising power. (Note: Reporter Song Ju-youl (송주열) in one story quotes a JMS defector A revealing there are about 500, while another quotes an alleged victim who estimates over 1,000.) The "Evergreens" are educated and handled by 10 women in Providence's leadership. (Note: According to Kim Jin-ho (김진호), former director of the cult and now representative of the group No JMS (JMS 피해대책협의회); she is quoted as saying "JMS는 현재 여성지도자 10여 명이 상록수를 관리하고 있다 (These are women currently in JMS's leadership, than 10 of them managed the evergreens)") Jo Gyeong-suk (조경숙), former head of the group's Seoul branch and herself an alleged victim, stated salvation through sexual union with Jung was part of its canon.

According to Jo, "not a few of those women committed suicide. They become severely depressed and receive psychiatric treatment, suffer various illnesses and social phobias as a result of the stress, and are unable to marry." The accusers added that Providence leader Jung, even while serving sentence in prison, is supplied with photograph profiles of female members, for him to make selections on which women would be inducted as "Evergreens".

=== Netflix and MBC documentary ===
In the Name of God: A Holy Betrayal is a 2023 Netflix and MBC docuseries that described the founding of the religious movement, indoctrination of its members, illegal heckling of dissidents committed by the group as well detailing the multiple rapes committed by sect leader Jung with testimonials from former members. Providence requested for a court injunction to prevent the Netflix series from airing. The request was denied as the South Korean court ruled that Netflix and MBC "appear to have made the program based on a considerable amount of objective and subjective materials backing its claim."

After the broadcast, JMS filed approximately 40 lawsuits and complaints against sexual assault victims, Professor Kim Do-hyeong of Dankook University, and PD Cho Seong-hyun. On August 16, 2024, the Mapo Police Station in Seoul referred the case against PD Cho Seong-hyun to the Seoul Western District Prosecutor's Office, applying charges of violating the Special Act on Sexual Violence. The reason for the charges was the allegation that PD Cho distributed a nude video that could provoke sexual desire or humiliation through the documentary. In response, Professor Kim Do-hyeong questioned, "This law was established to punish bizarre sexual criminals like Jeong Myeong-seok and his accomplices. Is this law really applicable to PD Cho Seong-hyun, who exposed the reality of the grotesque sexual offender Jeong Myeong-seok and raised awareness in society?" Meanwhile, as PD Cho Seong-hyun has been referred to the Seoul Western District Prosecutors' Office on charges of violating the Special Act on Sexual Violence, causing widespread social repercussions, JMS has sparked further controversy by initiating an organized petition campaign through a notice from the church members' association, calling for Cho's punishment. Producer Cho Sung-hyun, who had been accused of violating the Special Act on Sexual Violence, has been cleared of charges.

== Civil lawsuits and criminal convictions ==
Providence (then commonly known as JMS) leader Jung Myung-seok fled Korea in 1999 after Korean public broadcaster SBS reported on the rampant sexual abuse allegedly committed by Jung, and several civil lawsuits were subsequently filed against him. According to the Chinese and South Korean police, Jung had been on the run in Taiwan, Malaysia, Hong Kong, Japan, Mainland China and other countries between 1999 and 2007.

In 2001, Jung Myung-seok was investigated by Taiwanese authorities on multiple charges of sexual assault, but he left the country without standing trial. Taiwan Taipei District Prosecutor's Office then issued an arrest warrant for Jung in June 2003. Jung, having been wanted by Interpol since 2002, was arrested in Hong Kong in July 2003 for overstaying his visa, but was released three days later on a HK$10,000,000 (US$1.3 million as of July 2003) bail. When Hong Kong authorities approved extradition to Korea, Jung fled the extradition hearing.

An Interpol Red Notice was issued on Jung in 2004. In 2006, South Korean authorities put Jung on an international wanted list on rape charges, and after learning that Jung had fled to China, the South Korean government officially asked China in November 2006 to extradite him. In February 2007, Interpol requested for the fingerprints of Jung from South Korea, who was then thought to be in Costa Rican territories under false documentation.

According to Korean investigative magazine SisaIN, Jung was hiding in Qianshan near Anshan, Liaoning Province, China after escaping Hong Kong in 2003. After about 8 years on the run, Chinese Ministry of Public Security announced that Jung had been arrested in Beijing by Chinese police on May 1, 2007. Liaoning Provincial Higher People's Court ruled in September 2007 to extradite Jung, a decision upheld by the Supreme People's Court. He was extradited back to South Korea to stand charges on February 20, 2008. Jung was also charged with fraud and embezzlement of church funds.

A South Korean woman and a Japanese woman filed a criminal suit in 2003 against Jung for raping them. In January 2008, the Supreme Court of Korea awarded the two females ₩50,000,000 (US$52000 as of January 2008) and ₩10,000,000 (US$10400) in damages for rape. The court said Jung forced the followers to have sex with him, saying that it is a religious behavior meant to save their souls. Providence followers started riots outside of newspapers that reported the court's verdict, broke into the Seoul office of the leading newspaper The Dong-a Ilbo trashing office furniture, and demanded the removal of articles critical of Jung.

In the criminal case heard by the Seoul Central District Court, former members told the court that Jung was provided with female members of his sect as "gifts", and he would then have sex them on a religious pretext. Reportedly Jung would be shown photographs of female members of his church, and once he chooses his "sexual gift", she would be conveyed to his place of stay outside Korea.

In August 2008, Jung was convicted for raping female followers and sentenced by the Seoul Central District court to six years imprisonment. On February 10, 2009, the Seoul High Court added four years to the district court's sentence of six years, overturning one of the lower court's acquittals and finding Jung guilty on a total of four counts of rape. Jung appealed his 10 years imprisonment sentence to the Supreme Court of Korea, but the sentence was upheld in April 2009.

One of the sexually assaulted women subsequently filed a civil lawsuit against Jung. In its verdict in November 2009 Seoul Western District Court ruled that "the plaintiff's right to bodily integrity was violated and she suffered psychological pain as a result of the sexual violence of defendant... The defendant is obligated to compensate plaintiff for her pain." and that Jung should pay ₩50,000,000 in compensation.

Jung Myung-seok was subsequently released from jail on February 18, 2018.

On October 4, 2022, Jung Myung-seok was arrested by the Daejeon District Court on charges of sexually assaulting two women of Hong Kong and Australian nationalities. The alleged rapes were said to have occurred between 2018 and 2021 at JMS's Wolmyeongdong Sanctuary in Geumsan. He is charged and due to stand trial.

On October 8, 2024, the Supreme Court has finalized a 7-year prison sentence for Kim Ji-sun, also known as Jeong Jo-eun, the "second-in-command" of the JMS cult, for aiding and abetting quasi-rape and forcible molestation. In addition to the prison sentence, she has been ordered to complete 80 hours of a sexual violence treatment program and faces a 10-year employment restriction. Other individuals involved, including the civil affairs director and a senior official, received 3 years in prison and a suspended 1 year and 6 months sentence with 3 years of probation, respectively. Two personal secretaries were acquitted.

The court dismissed a lawsuit filed by the cosmetics brand "URG Chamfrey" against "Religion & Truth", seeking approximately 100 million KRW in damages related to reports alleging JMS's financial ties.

On January 9, 2025, the Supreme Court finalized a 17 year prison sentence for Jung Myung-seok.

== See also ==
- Heterodox teachings (Chinese law)
- List of messiah claimants
- Wolmyeongdong
