= Kim Seong-soo (judge) =

South Korean judge

- official portrait

Associate Justice of the Supreme Court of Korea
- Incumbent
- Assumed office September 21, 2026
- Nominated by: Jo Hee-de
- Appointed by: Lee Jae-myung

Personal details
- Born: August 26, 1968 (age 58) Hampyeong, South Korea
- Education: Hanyang University

Kim Seong-soo (Korean: 김성수; born August 26, 1968) is a South Korean judge. Chun is an associate Justice of the Supreme Court of Korea and was Chief Presiding Judge of the Cheongju District Court.

== Early life ==
Kim was born in Hampyeong on August 26, 1968. He graduated from Gwangju Inseong High School. Kim earned a Bachelor of Laws degree from Hanyang University´s College of Law. He passed the National Judicial Exam in 1992, after which he became a public service advocate.

== Career ==
In 1998, Kim became a judge in the Gwangju District Court. Kim has also served in the Ansan Branch Court of the Suwon District Court, Jeju District Court, Daejeon High Court, and Seoul High Court. Kim was a ethics audit coordination in the National Court Administration and a head professor at the Judicial Research and Training Institute. He was Chief Presiding Judge of the Cheongju District Court.

=== Supreme Court of Korea ===
On August 18, 2026, chief justice Cho Hee-dae recommended Kim and chief judge of the Daegu District Court Son Bong-kie for the Supreme Court of Korea. The Blue House refused to submit a request for parliamentary consent to the National Assembly for the nomination of Son, but did submit a request for parliamentary consent for Kim´s nomination. The chief justice normally gives his recommendations for Justice of the Supreme Court of Korea to the President in person, but Cho´s recommendation of Kim was given in writing.

Kim replaced retiring justice Lee Heung-gu. During a special parliamentary committee meeting over his nomination, the People Power Party said he was unfit to be a Justice, stating that he was unqualified and questioning whether he could be neutral as a Justice. The Democratic Party saw Kim more positively.

The National Assembly approved Kim´s nomination to the court on September 17, 2026, with a 227-28 vote. 13 people abstained from the vote. On September 21, 2026, Kim became a Justice of the Supreme Court of Korea. Kim was the first Justice appointed in president Lee Jae Myung´s administration.
