= Kim Seong-su (disambiguation) =

- Hangul: 김성수
- RR: Gim Seongsu
- MR: Kim Sŏngsu

Inchon Kim Seong-su (1891–1955) was a South Korean educator, journalist and politician.

Gim Seong-su or Kim Song-su (Korean: 김성수) may also refer to:

- Kim Sung-su (director) (born 1961), South Korean film director
- Kim Sung-soo (actor) (born 1973), South Korean actor
- Kim Sung-soo (footballer) (born 1963), South Korean footballer
- Kim Seong-soo (footballer) (born 1992), South Korean footballer
- Kim Seong-soo (judge), South Korean judge
