= Chun Woo-won =

South Korean activist (born 1996)

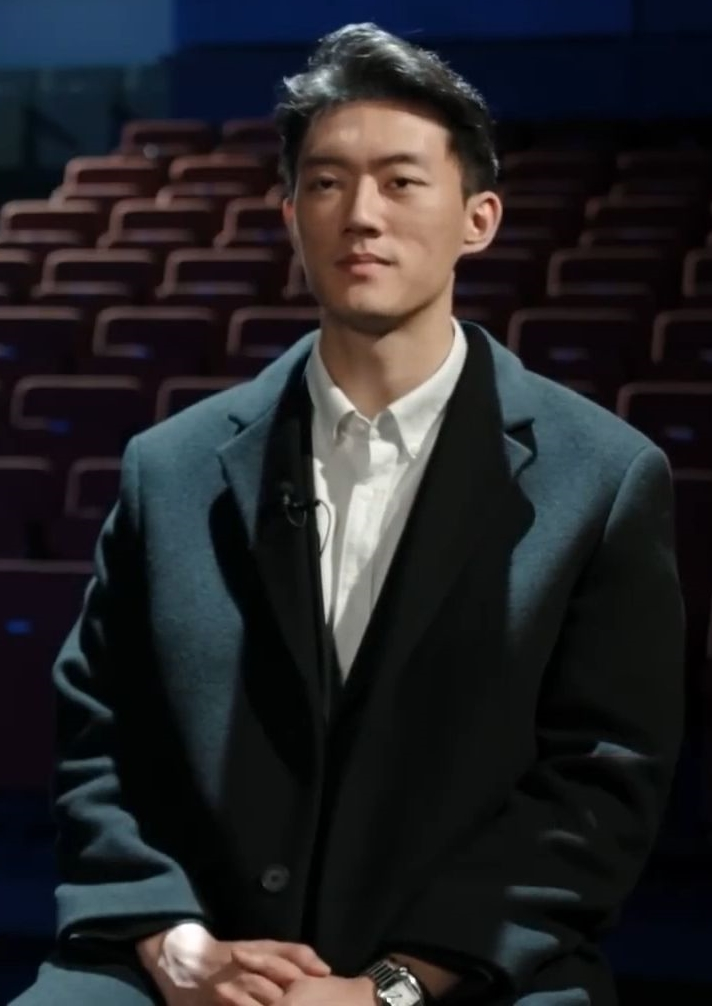
- Chun in May 2023
- Born: Chun Woo-won; 23 January 1996 (age 30); Seoul, South Korea
- Other names: Jeon Woo-won; Jamie Chun
- Education: New York University Stern School of Business
- Occupations: Human rights activist; Accountant; Artist
- Years active: 2023 – present
- Relatives: Chun Doo-hwan (grandfather)

Korean name
- Hangul: 전우원
- RR: Jeon Uwon
- MR: Chŏn Uwŏn

Chun Woo-won (Korean: 전우원; born January 23, 1996), also known by the English name Jamie Chun, is a South Korean activist and whistleblower. He is the grandson of the late South Korean military leader and president Chun Doo-hwan. In 2023, he garnered widespread international attention after publicly denouncing his family's history and becoming the first direct descendant of the former dictator to formally apologize for the 1980 Gwangju Massacre.

== Early life and family ==
Chun was born in 1996 as the second son of Chun Jae-yong, the second son of Chun Doo-hwan. He lived in Seoul until the seventh grade, after which he moved to the United States. Chun attended the NYU Stern School of Business in New York City, where he studied business and economics. Despite his residency in the U.S., Chun returned to South Korea to fulfill his mandatory military service, serving for two years. He spent part of his childhood in South Korea before moving to the United States for his education, eventually working at an accounting firm in New York City.

His upbringing within the influential Chun family was marked by what he later described as a distorted education where he was taught that his grandfather was a hero and that the 1980 pro-democracy movement in Gwangju was a "riot".

== Whistleblowing and revelations (2023) ==
In March 2023, Chun launched a series of social media broadcasts from New York making several high-profile allegations against his family. He accused his relatives of maintaining a lavish lifestyle funded by illegal slush funds hidden by his grandfather. He claimed to have witnessed and experienced physical abuse and neglect within the family residence.

He publicly labeled his grandfather a "mass murderer," "slaughterer," and "criminal". During a livestream on March 17, 2023, he consumed several narcotics, including LSD and ecstasy, expressing a desire to be punished for his family's crimes and his own personal vices.

== Return to South Korea and Gwangju apology ==
Chun returned to South Korea on March 28, 2023, where he was immediately arrested at Incheon International Airport on suspicion of drug use. He was released the following day after cooperating with authorities. On March 31, 2023, he visited Gwangju, becoming the first direct descendant of Chun Doo-hwan to formally apologize to the bereaved families of the May 18 Democratization Movement. In a highly publicized ceremony, he performed a keunjeol (a full-prostration bow) before victims and survivors. He publicly thanked the citizens of Gwangju for accepting his apology, stating that his grandfather had "stamped on heroes... with military boots". He cleaned the tombstones of victims at the May 18 National Cemetery using his own coat.

== Legal proceedings ==
Chun was indicted for violating the Narcotics Control Act. In December 2023, the Seoul Central District Court sentenced him to 30 months in prison, suspended for four years. The court cited his sincere remorse and voluntary return to the country as reasons for leniency. An appeals court confirmed this sentence in April 2024, adding requirements for three years of probation, 120 hours of community service, and 80 hours of drug treatment.

== Digital storytelling ==
In late 2025, Chun began releasing an AI-generated webtoon series on his Instagram titled Monggeuli. The series features a lamb character, "Monggeuli" (representing Chun), who lives in a castle inhabited by "black-horned sheep" (representing his father and grandfather). The webtoon details his childhood trauma, his dawning realization of the brutality of the Gwangju Massacre, and his struggles with depression and drug addiction. Chun concluded the first installment of the series, which depicts his character's return to Korea and subsequent arrest. He has expressed a desire to continue telling his story to prevent the erasure of historical truths.
