= Eom Sang Phil =

South Korean judge

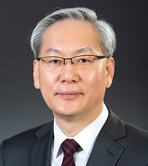
- Eom in 2024

Associate Justice of the Supreme Court of Korea
- Incumbent
- Assumed office February 29, 2024

Judge of the Seoul High Court
- In office 2021 – February 29, 2024

Personal details
- Born: December 1, 1968 (age 57) Jinju, South Korea
- Education: Seoul National University

Eom Sang Phil (Korean: 엄상필) is a South Korean judge. He is a Justice of the Supreme Court of Korea and was a judge of the Seoul High Court.

== Biography ==
Eom was born on December 1, 1968 in Jinju. He gained a degree from Seoul National University.

Eom has been a judge in Seoul since 1997, and he was appointed to the Seoul High Court in 2021. Eom was confirmed by the National Assembly to become a Justice of the Supreme Court of Korea on February 28, 2024, and then President Yoon Suk Yeol appointed them the next day.
