= Jung Myung-seok =

South Korean clergy (born 1945)

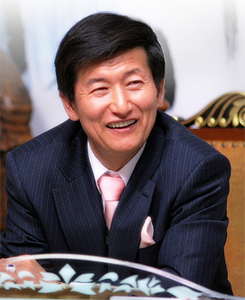
- Jung in 2011
- Born: 16 March 1945 (age 81); Wolmyeongdong, Geumsan County, South Chungcheong, South Korea
- Other names: Pastor Joshua; Jeong Myeong-seok; Joshua Jung; Joshua Lee
- Citizenship: South Korea
- Education: Wesley Theological Seminary; Chungnam National University
- Occupation: Clergy
- Known for: Founding of Providence religious movement
- Criminal information
- Criminal information
- Organization: Providence (religious movement)
- Conviction: Sexual assault

Korean name
- Hangul: 정명석
- Hanja: 鄭明錫
- RR: Jeong Myeongseok
- MR: Chŏng Myŏngsŏk

Jung Myung-seok (Korean: 정명석; born 16 March 1945; sometimes spelled Jeong Myeong-Seok) is a South Korean clergyman convicted of sexual assault, who founded and led the Providence religious movement, also known as Christian Gospel Mission (CGM) or Jesus Morning Star (JMS), a Christian new religious movement that is commonly referred to as a Christian sect or cult. Jung was convicted of rape by the Supreme Court of Korea and was sentenced to 10 years' imprisonment between 2008 and 2018. He was again indicted in South Korea on 28 October 2022 for sexually assaulting two female followers between 2018 and 2022. On 9 January 2025, he would be sentenced by the Supreme Court of Korea to 17 years imprisonment after again being convicted of rape.

Jung is a self-proclaimed messiah. He founded Providence in 1980, which was headquartered in Wolmyeongdong, South Korea. The religious group has since expanded to Taiwan, Japan, Hong Kong, Australia, and other countries.

== Early life ==
Jung Myung-seok was born in 1945. He is also known by the names of Joshua Jung, Joshua Lee, and Pastor Joshua. According to an interview with Providence's Director of External Affairs in 2020, Jung graduated from the Methodist Wesley Theological Seminary in 1983, completed an executive management program at the graduate school of Administration, Chungnam University in 1998, and received an honorary doctorate of philosophy from Open University of Sri Lanka in 2001.

== Providence ==
=== Founding of the Providence movement (1980–1998) ===
Jung Myung-seok joined as a member of the Unification Church in 1974, where he taught briefly in 1978. In 1980 he founded the Ae-chun Church or Church of Providence. Its religious events were held in university football stadiums, sometimes in the form of football matches. Jung recruited elite Korean students on campuses through sports and a variety of student interest clubs.

=== Self-imposed exile and criminal convictions (1999–2008) ===
Jung Myung-seok fled South Korea in 1999 after Korean television broadcaster Seoul Broadcasting System aired its exposé on the sex crimes of Jung on 20 March 1999. He hid in Hong Kong and mainland China for years before he was extradited from Beijing, China, in February 2008 to face charges in South Korea.

While Jung was on the run, Providence (then known mostly as JMS) continued publishing Jung's sermons online, providing telephone counseling and holding overseas events for their followers.

According to former Providence members, Jung traveled often to Japan to proselytize until 2002. He was said to have stayed in his followers' homes in Osaka and Chiba prefectures, where he gathered at least 10 female followers daily and sexually assaulted them "under the pretext of health checks". Japanese female followers were said to be brought overseas for rendezvous with Jung and told not to reveal these trips to others, or they would be condemned to Hell.

Besides being prosecuted in South Korea, Jung was also indicted by the Taiwanese District Prosecutors Office on charges of rape in 2003 but failed to appear in court. He remains wanted by the Taiwan Taipei District Prosecutors Office until the arrest warrant expires in 2027.

Jung was arrested in Hong Kong in July 2003 for overstaying his visa but was released three days later on bail. When Hong Kong authorities approved extradition to Korea, Jung fled the extradition hearing. An Interpol Red Notice was issued on Jung in 2003 for multiple counts of fraud, sexual crimes, and embezzlement. In 2006 South Korean authorities put Jung on an international wanted list on rape charges. By October 2006, South Korean prosecutors had filed nine charges and accusations against him.

After learning that Jung had fled to China, the South Korean government officially asked China in November 2006 to extradite him. In February 2007, Interpol requested the fingerprints of Jung from South Korea, who was then thought to be in Costa Rican territories under false documentation.

Jung was reportedly hiding in Qianshan near Anshan, Liaoning Province, China, after escaping Hong Kong in 2003. After about eight years on the run, Chinese Ministry of Public Security announced that Jung had been arrested in Beijing by Chinese police on 1 May 2007. Jung was questioned by the Chinese authorities for the sexual assault he allegedly committed in China. The Liaoning Provincial Higher People's Court ruled in September 2007 to extradite Jung, a decision upheld by the Supreme People's Court. He was extradited back to South Korea to face charges in February 2008. Jung was also charged with fraud and embezzlement of church funds.

Seoul prosecutors indicted him on five charges of sexually assaulting five female followers from 2001 to 2006 in Malaysia, Hong Kong, and China. Jung was initially convicted on three counts of rape and acquitted on one count, with one case dismissed because the victim dropped the charges. He was sentenced to six years of imprisonment in 2008. An appeal court added four more years to his sentence in 2009, convicting him on all four charges of rape between 2001 and 2006.

=== Growing the Providence movement from jail (2008–2018) ===
In April 2009, Jung Myung-seok was convicted of 4 counts of rape by the Supreme Court of Korea and was sentenced to 10 years imprisonment. During his incarceration between 2008 and 2018, Jung's sermons and directives were delivered through visitors to the prison and through his successor Jung Jo-eun (real name Kim Ji-seon).

Members of the Providence Church, now mostly known as the Christian Gospel Movement (CGM), tried to downplay their religious ties when proselytizing. They often recruit members from shopping malls and university campuses in Taiwan, Japan and Australia. Other new members are recruited from student clubs in universities (e.g. modeling, cheerleading, groups focused on sustainable development goals issues), before they are introduced to the Providence doctrine and CGM church services with Jung's sermons. According to former members, some female followers are then introduced as spiritual brides for the leader and coerced or forced into sexual relationships with their perceived messiah.

In 2014, Australian public broadcaster SBS aired a feature Inside Providence: The Korean church cult led by a convicted rapist, in which former Australian members described how they were encouraged to write letters, send photos of themselves in bikinis and visit Jung in jail. Members are encouraged to ignore news on Jung's imprisonment and alleged crimes, claiming he is a messiah suffering for them. In a 2023 interview, a source confirmed that members were indoctrinated to believe Jung was wrongfully accused.

Jung was released from jail on 18 February 2018.

=== 2018–present ===
Jung Myung-seok was indicted in South Korea on 28 October 2022, for sexually assaulting a follower from Hong Kong and sexually abusing an Australian follower.

On 13 March 2023, it was reported that Providence's second-in-command Jung Jo-eun, stated that there were seven people from the church who were sexually assaulted by Jung Myung-seok, of which two were minors. She also said that a Providence member said Jung Myung-seok gave false testimony. Jung Jo-Eun said in a recorded video that she had tried to prevent female followers from entering within a 3-meter radius next to Jung Myung-seok.

On 22 December 2023, the 12th Criminal Division of the Daejeon District Court, presided over by Chief Judge Na Sang-hoon, sentenced Jung Myung-seok to 23 years in prison in a sentencing trial for charges including quasi-rape and forced molestation. The court also ordered a 10-year disclosure of personal information, 15 years of wearing a location-tracking electronic device, and a 10-year ban on employment in institutions related to children and adolescents.

Pastor Kim Dae-deok, co-representative of the Christian Gospel Mission, expressed concern over the first trial's verdict, stating that fair procedures were ignored and constitutional principles were violated. He criticized the biased attitude of the court and its use of vague concepts in the judgment, announcing their intention to appeal immediately. Following the teachings of Jung Myung-seok, the organization pledged to fight with truth and peace, and Kwak Dong-won, representative of the church council, declared that they would continue to seek justice until Pastor Jung's innocence is proven.

Regarding this, Jung Myung-seok's side has appealed, and the appellate trial is ongoing. According to legal sources, Jung Myung-seok's detention period is set to expire on 15 August. Under the Criminal Procedure Act, a defendant detained during the first trial can have their detention extended up to three times during the appeals trial, with each extension lasting two months. However, since all six months have already been used, further extensions are not possible. This means that Jung could be released and stand trial without being detained until the appellate court delivers its verdict. The Daejeon High Court’s Criminal Division 3 initially planned to hold the sentencing hearing on 25 July but has decided to continue the proceedings on 22 August. The prosecution, considering that Jung's detention period would end soon, requested that witness examinations be completed even late at night, but this request was reportedly not accepted. Victims are protesting against Jung's release, and there are allegations that Jung's side intentionally delayed the trial to take advantage of the expiration of the detention period.

The Daejeon District Court's Criminal Division 11 issued an arrest warrant for Jung Myung-seok on 13 August on charges including quasi-rape and violation of the Act on the Punishment of Violence (joint coercion), citing concerns of potential flight risk after completing the warrant review. Jung Myung-seok’s detention period can be renewed twice, in increments of two months each, allowing for a maximum of six months. As a result, Jung Myung-seok will face both the sixth appellate trial scheduled for 22 August and the first trial for another sexual assault case while in custody. The final arguments from Jung Myung-seok's side, along with the court's ruling, are expected to take place during the appellate trial on 6 September.

Jung Myung-seok was convicted of rape and sexual assault against foreign female followers and initially sentenced to 23 years in prison. In his appeal, however, the court reduced his sentence by six years to 17 years. The victims of Jung Myung-seok, who was sentenced to 17 years in prison, have filed a civil lawsuit against him, seeking 750 million KRW (approximately $570,000) in damages, based on the criminal charges outlined in his trial. Additional charges are still being tried, and there are around ten ongoing investigations led by the prosecution. Considering Jung’s age, it appears unlikely that he will be released alive.

On 9 January 2025, Jung Myung-seok was sentenced to 17 years in prison by the Supreme Court of South Korea. The Supreme Court's Second Division (Presiding Justice Oh Kyung-mi) upheld the lower court's ruling, confirming the 17-year sentence. The order for 15 years of electronic location tracking also remained unchanged. Meanwhile, the JMS headquarters strongly protested the ruling, expressing regret over the alleged failure to uncover the full truth in a statement titled "The Church's Position on Pastor Jung Myung-seok's Supreme Court Ruling," released immediately after the verdict.

It has been revealed that Ryu Jae-bok, a reporter from the internet newspaper Jeonggyeong Sisa FOCUS, which has been consistently known for writing articles in defense of Jeong Myeong-seok, was given priority entry into the courtroom, causing controversy. There are criticisms that this is unfair as equal reporting opportunities were not provided to mainstream Christian media.

== Controversies ==
=== Secret faction operating within police force ===
A group called "Sasabu", composed of JMS followers within the South Korean police, is said to exist with around 150 members. Director Cho Seong-hyun, who produced the Netflix documentary In the Name of God: A Holy Betrayal, revealed that members of the first and third classes of the Korean National Police University are part of this group. He also stated that he has obtained photos taken with Jung Myung-seok and plans to reveal them in In the Name of God: A Holy Betrayal 2 on Netflix.

Meanwhile, the issue of the secret organization within JMS, known as "Sasabu" has been exposed during the National Assembly's Public Administration and Security Committee audit of the police, causing significant repercussions.

On 11 October 2024, the Seoul Metropolitan Police Agency decided to suspend Captain Kang, an officer from the Seocho Police Station, for his involvement in obstructing the police investigation into Jeong Myeong-seok.

== See also ==
- List of messiah claimants
- Messiah complex – Belief that one is a messiah or prophet
- Religion in South Korea
- Unification Church – International new religious movement
