= Wolmyeongdong =

Religious center in South Korea

- 월명동
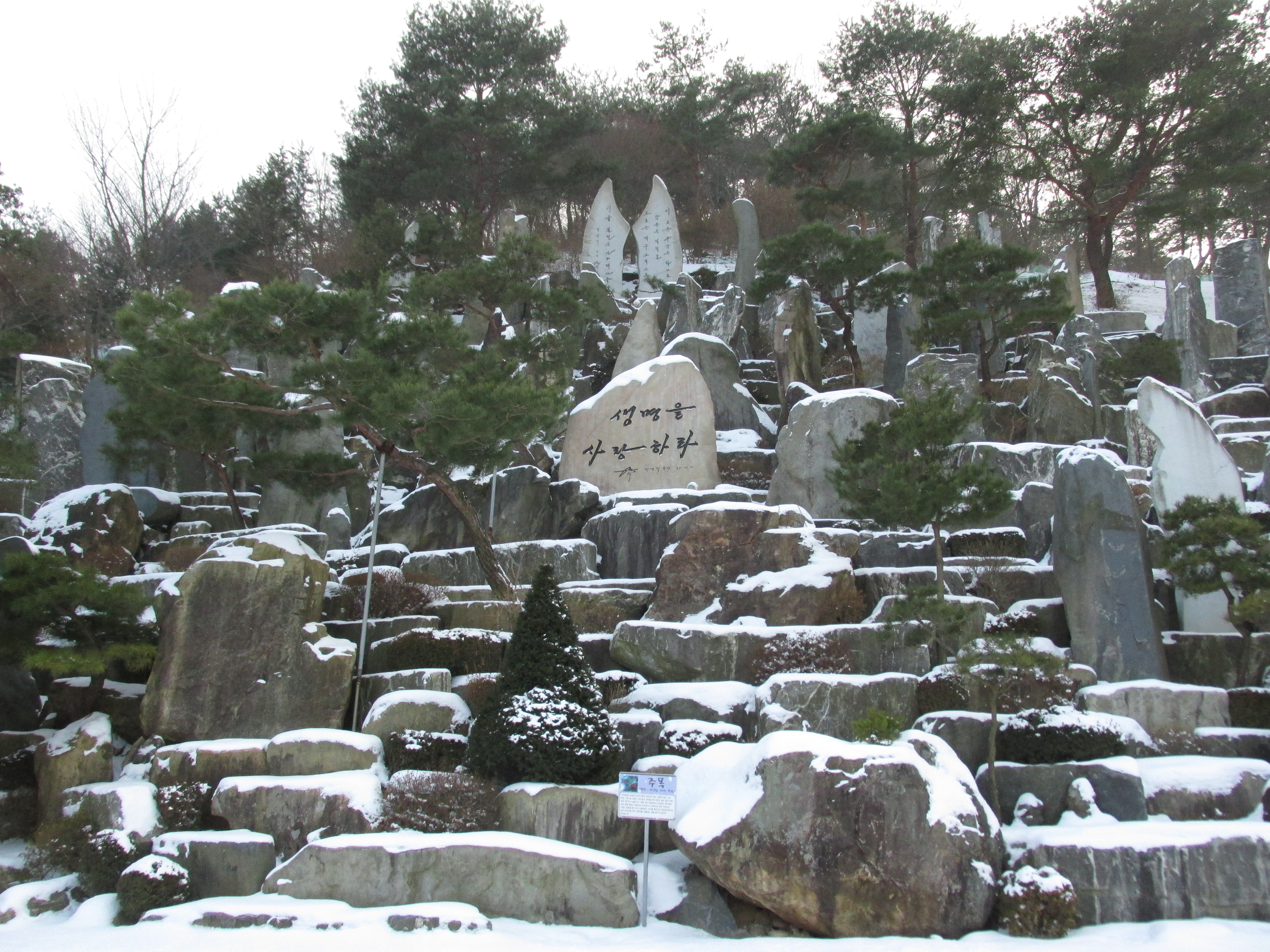
- Wolmyeongdong Ambition Rock Portion in Winter

Religion
- Status: Active

Location
- Location: Seokmak-ri, Jinsan-myeon, Geumsan County, South Chungcheong Province
- Country: South Korea
- Interactive map of Wolmyeongdong
- Coordinates: 36°07′29″N 127°22′13″E

Architecture
- Founder: Jung Myung-seok
- Completed: 1990

Website
- Wolmyeongdong Official Site Official English Site

- Wolmyeongdong
- Hangul: 월명동
- Hanja: 月明洞
- Revised Romanization: Wolmyeongdong
- McCune–Reischauer: Wŏlmyŏngdong

Wolmyeongdong (also known as Wol Myeong Dong, Korean: 월명동; Hanja: 月明洞; lit. 'bright moon valley') is a worship and recreation center in Chungnam Province, South Korea. It is also known as the headquarters of the Providence Church, also known as Christian Gospel Mission (CGM) and Jesus Morning Star (JMS). Wolmyeongdong consists of various facilities and buildings on an area of land of about 991,735 square meters in size.

Wolmyeongdong Training Center is the name commonly used externally. Within the JMS organization, it is referred to as the Christian Gospel Mission Natural Training Center or the Wolmyeongdong Natural Temple. The village, originally named Dalbakgol due to its bright moonlight, was renamed Wolmyeongdong. Additionally, the new address of the road leading to the current Wolmyeongdong Training Center is also designated as Wolmyeongdong-gil.

Development of Wolmyeongdong began in the early 1990s and was led by the Providence founder Jung Myung-seok, a messiah claimant. Wolmyeongdong is Jung Myung-seok's birthplace. Jung was found by Korean courts to have coerced and forced female followers to have sex with him "as a religious behavior meant to save their souls" in 2008 and convicted on four charges of rape. He was subsequently imprisoned for 10 years and released in 2018. In 2022, more women filed reports on alleged rape and sexual assault incidents at the JMS Wolmyeongdong headquarters.

Followers firmly believing Jung Myung-seok to be the reincarnation of Jesus Christ consider his birthplace as a holy site and utilize the surrounding monastery as their communal headquarters. The influence of JMS in the Wolmyeongdong area is extensive, with a scale that is difficult to measure. His residence, accommodations for followers, worship halls, and auditoriums densely populate the area, forming a small village in its own right. Currently, it is estimated that at least 100 followers reside in this monastery. Additionally, during events like Jung Myung-seok's birthday or retreats held in summer and winter, hundreds to thousands of visitors are known to gather. Followers from across the country primarily access the village by boarding tour buses operated by the monastery.

As a recreation center, Wolmyeongdong contains various hiking and walking trails, a pond, an art gallery, a rock museum, a sports field, natural spring waters, as well as various other amenities. However, since it is also a temple in nature that has been dedicated to the Holy Trinity, statues of the Holy Son can be seen around the sports field.

== Controversy ==
=== Exploitation of Followers' Labor ===
The construction of the "Wolmyeongdong Natural Temple" by JMS began in the early 1990s and lasted nearly 25 years. Followers, unaware of Jeong Myeong-seok’s sexual crimes, were unable to refuse orders to participate. Many, including women, were forced to work on the temple’s rock landscaping, often under dangerous conditions without protective gear or safety training. The rocks, some weighing tens of tons, collapsed multiple times, leading to near-fatal accidents. Despite warnings from experts and incidents of injury and death, the work continued, often at night and in silence.

== Gallery ==
=== Hiking Trails ===
Wolmyeongdong Hiking Trails

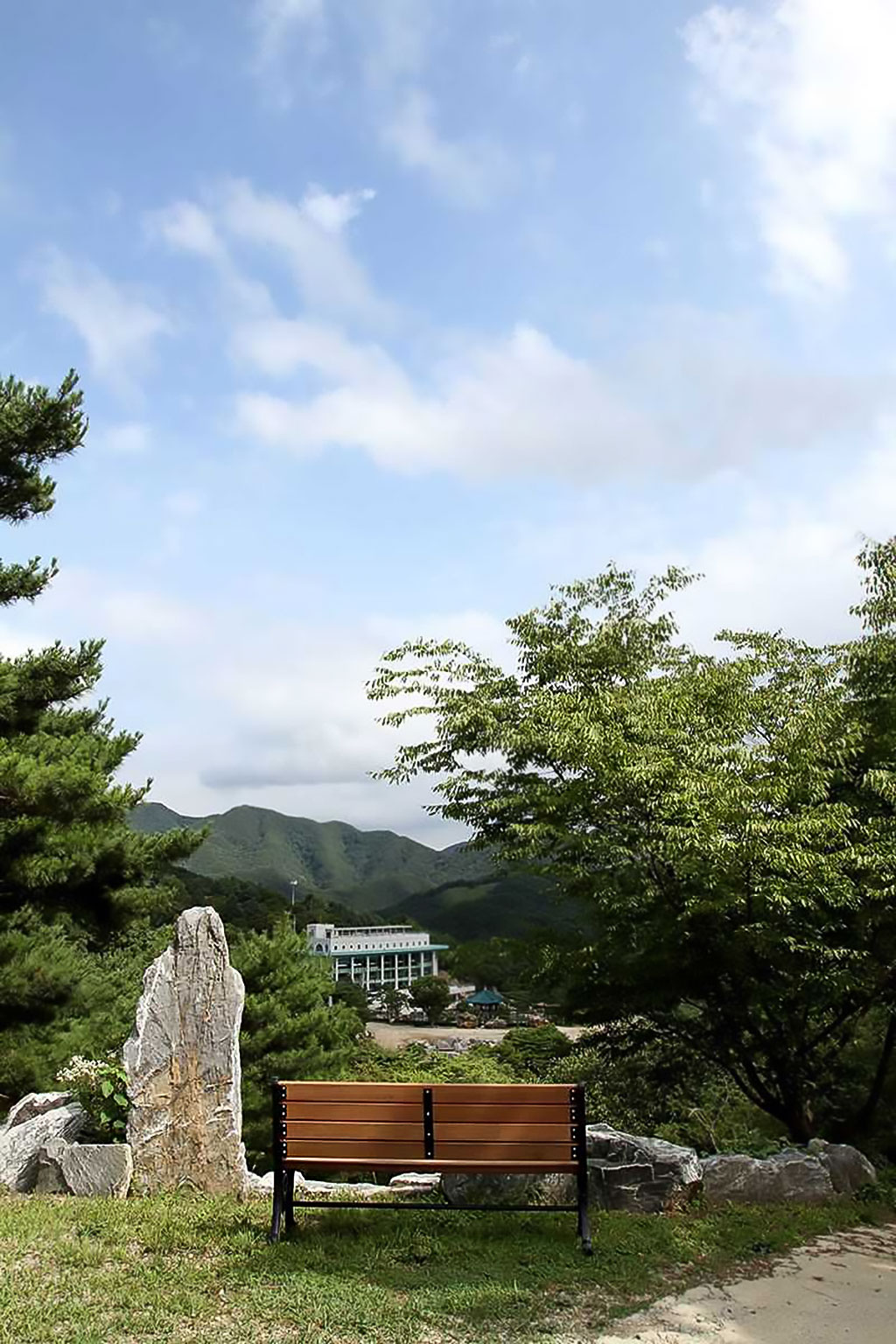
A place to rest and enjoy the sights along one of the hiking trails in Wolmyeongdong

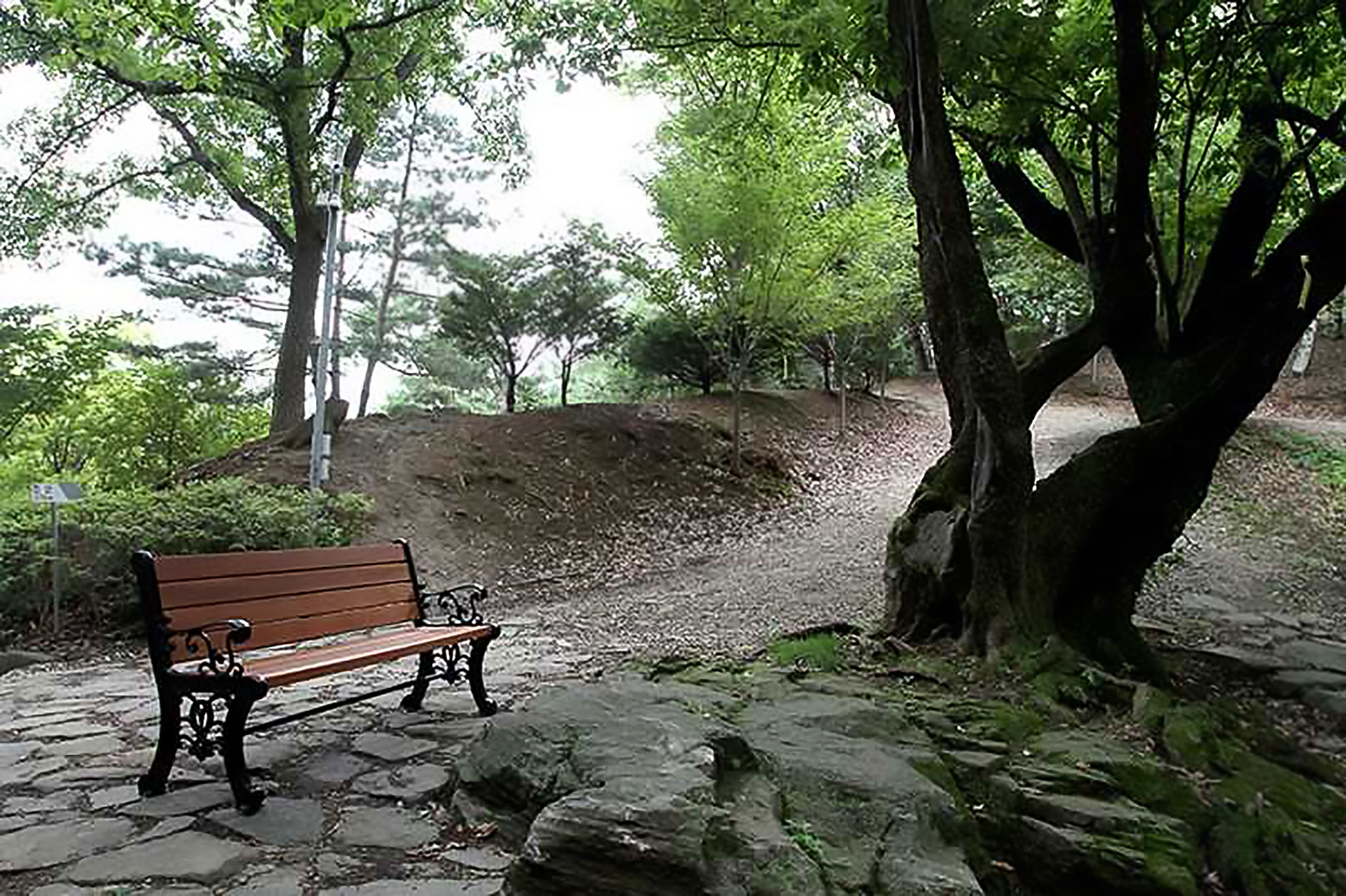
A hiking trail in Wolmyeongdong close

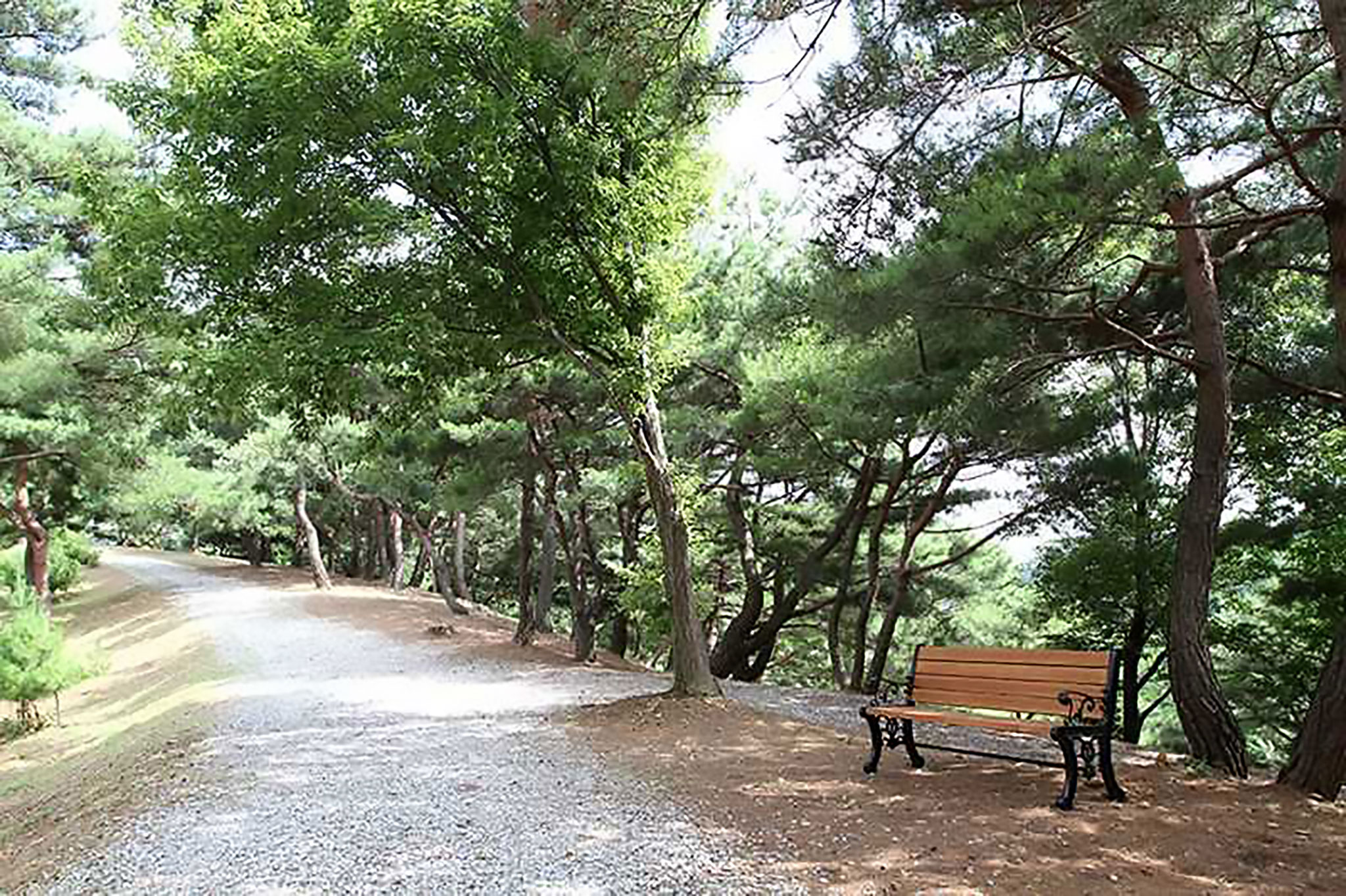
A hiking trail in Wolmyeongdong that was paved with stone pebbles

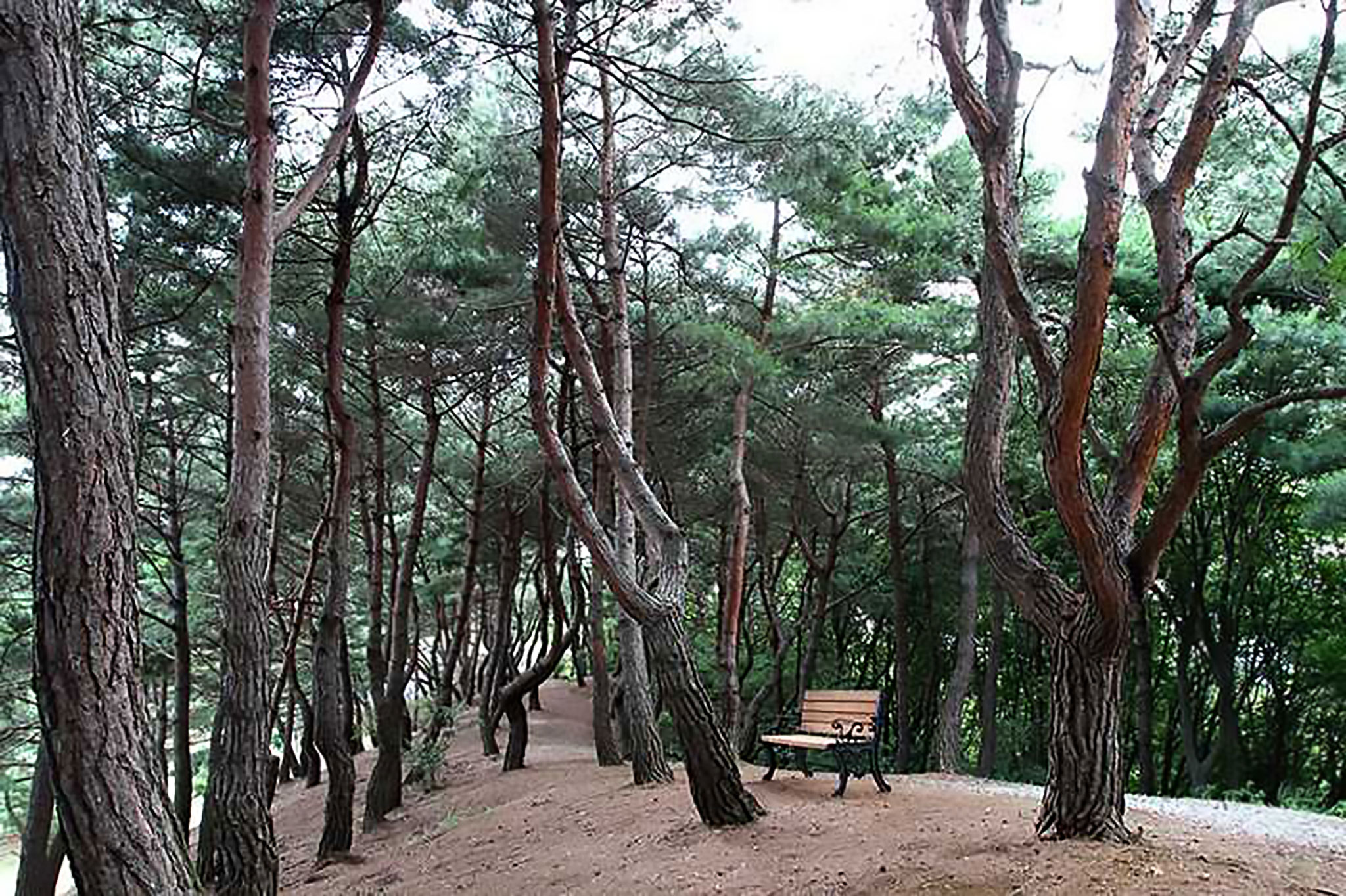
A hiking trail in Wolmyeongdong aligned with many pine trees
