= Lee Sook-yeon =

South Korean justice

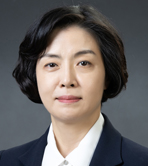
- Lee in 2024

Associate Justice of the Supreme Court of Korea
- Incumbent
- Assumed office August 6, 2024

Lee Sook-yeon (Korean: 이숙연) is a South Korean justice. Lee was approved to the Supreme Court of Korea by the National Assembly on August 5, 2024. Then President Yoon Suk Yeol gave Lee her letter of appointment on August 13, 2024. Prior to be appointed to the Supreme Court of Korea, Lee was a patent judge.

Lee's confirmation by the National Assembly was postponed due to allegations that her daughter economically benefited from unlisted stock transactions, which were considered nepotism. In response to the allegations, Lee apologized and stated that the unlisted stocks held by her daughter and herself would be donated.
