= Oh Seok-joon =

South Korean justice

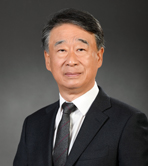
- Oh in 2022

Associate Justice of the Supreme Court of Korea
- Incumbent
- Assumed office November 25, 2022

Chief Justice of the Jeju District Court
- In office 2021–2022

Personal details
- Born: October 29, 1962 (age 63) Paju, Gyeonggi-do, South Korea
- Education: Seoul National University

Oh Seok-joon (Korean: 오석준) is a South Korean politician. Oh is currently a Justice of the Supreme Court of Korea, and was the Chief Justice of the Jeju District Court.

== Biography ==
Oh gained a degree from Seoul National University. He became a judge of the Jeju District Court in 2013, and the Chief Justice of the Jeju District Court in 2021.

Oh was one of three nominees for his current seat on the Supreme Court, and Oh was chosen by Chief Justice Kim Myeong-soo to be reviewed for appointed by President Yoon Suk Yeol. During his confirmation hearing, Oh stated that he was against the death penalty.

Oh was confirmed by the National Assembly 119 days after he was recommended by Kim. Oh joined the Supreme Court on November 25, 2022. Oh replaced Justice Kim Jae-hyung on the Supreme Court.
