= Seoul Northern District Court =

District court in Seoul, South Korea

The Seoul Northern District Court (Korean: 서울북부지방법원) is a district court with jurisdiction over Dobong, Gangbuk, Seongbuk, Dongdaemun, Jungnang, and Nowon in Seoul.

The court was established on September 1, 1974.
