= Daejeon High Court =

High court in Daejeon, South Korea

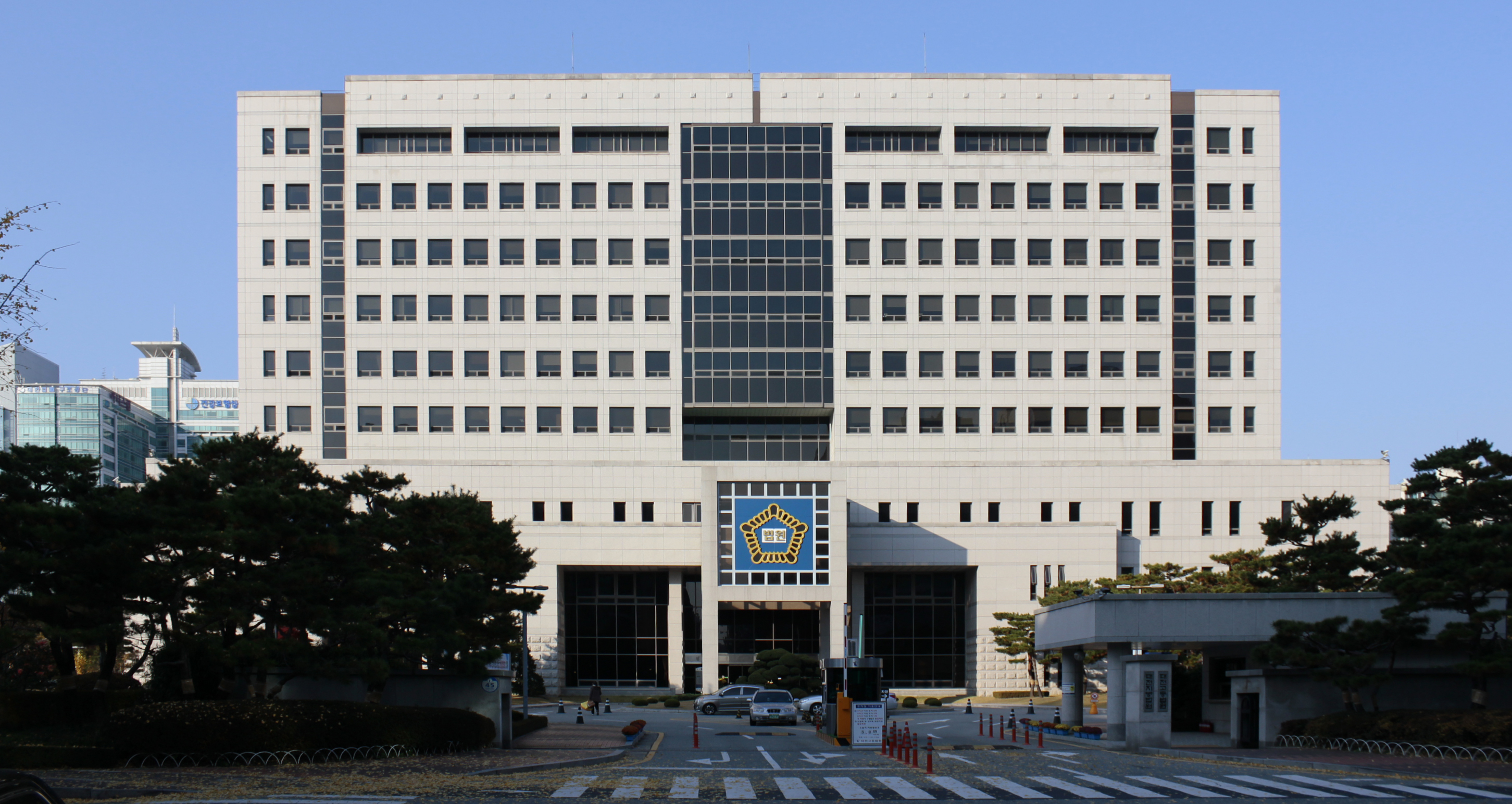
- Building housing both the Daejeon High Court and Daejeon District Court

Agency overview
- Headquarters: 45, Dunsanjung-ro 78beon-gil, Seo-gu, Daejeon, Korea

The Daejeon High Court (Korean: 대전고등법원) is a high court in South Korea. Its jurisdiction consists of Chungnam, Daejeon, and Chungbuk.

== History ==
In 2023, the Daejeon High Court ruled in favor of a Japanese temple in a case over a statue that had been stolen from the Japanese temple and was then claimed to be owned by a South Korean temple after the South Korean government seized the statue due to claims that the statue was stolen in the 14th century by Japanese wako pirates. In October 2024, the Daeju High Court reduced Jeong Myeong-seok's prison sentence due to errors and faulty application of the law in previous case.
