= Seoul Southern District Court =

District court in Seoul, South Korea

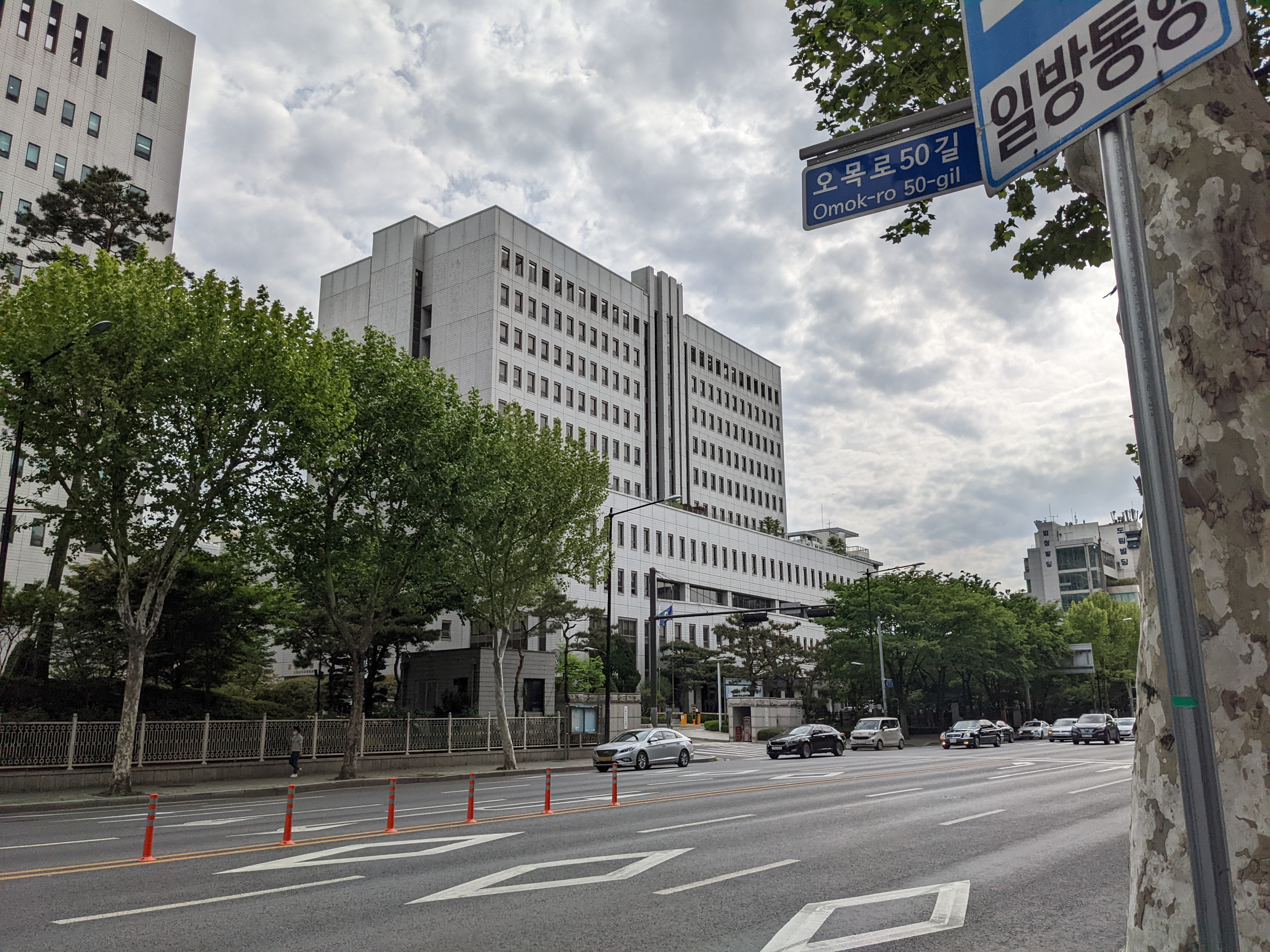
Seoul Southern District Court, West Wing.

The Seoul Southern District Court (Korean: 서울남부지방법원) is a district court with jurisdiction over Gangseo, Yangcheon, Yeongdeungpo, Guro, and Geumcheon in Seoul, South Korea.

The court was established on September 1, 1971.
