= Seoul High Court =

Court in Seoul, South Korea

- 서울고등법원

Agency overview
- Headquarters: 157 Seochojungang-ro Seocho-dong Seocho-gu Seoul 06594, Korea
- Agency executive: 김대웅, 법원장
- Website: http://slgodung.scourt.go.kr/

The Seoul High Court (Korean: 서울고등법원) is a high court in South Korea. It is composed of the Chief Justice of the High Court and a number of judges specified by the Supreme Court Rules, and its adjudication power is subordinate to the Consensus Division, which consists of three judges. Seoul, Incheon, Gyeonggi Province, and Gangwon Province are under its jurisdiction.

== History ==
On August 1, 1908, during the Korean Empire, the Kyŏngsŏng Appeals Court was established for the first time.

In 1996, the Seoul High Court sentenced former president Chun Doo-hwan to life in prison for insurrection and mutiny. Another former president, Roh Tae-woo, was given a 17-year sentence for his involvement.

In 2018, the court sentenced former president Park Geun-hye to 25 years in prison for charges including bribery, extortion, and abuse of power.

In 2020, the Supreme Court upheld Seoul High Court's ruling sentencing former President Lee Myung-bak to 17 years in prison for embezzlement and bribes. The High Court also fined him 13 billion won.

In 2021, the Seoul High Court overturned the Seoul Eastern District Court's conviction of Shinhan Financial Group chairman Cho Yong-byoung for corrupt hiring practices.

In February 2023, the Seoul High Court overturned a lower court decision allowing the NHIS to not expand equal benefits to same-sex couples. In April, the court upheld the Fair Trade Commission's KRW 1 trillion fine and six out of ten of its corrective orders on Qualcomm after the company appealed in 2017. In November, the court ruled that the Government of Japan would have to compensate former comfort women, which Japan's Ministry of Foreign Affairs stated was a violation of "State immunity under international law."

In February 2025, Seoul High Court upheld a ruling by the Seoul Central District Court acquitting Samsung Electronics Chairman Lee Jae-yong of all 19 charges in relation to the 2015 merger of Cheil Industries and Samsung C&T, including stock manipulation, breach of trust, and accounting fraud.

In February 2026, the court sentenced former Supreme Court Chief Justice Yang Sung-tae to six months in prison for interference in trials. This marked the first instance of a Supreme Court Chief Justice in South Korea being found guilty in a criminal trial.

== See also ==
- 1979 South Korean coup d'état
