= Seoul Eastern District Court =

District court in Seoul, South Korea

The Seoul Eastern District Court (Korean: 서울동부지방법원) is a district court with jurisdiction over Seongdong, Gwangjin, Gangdong, and Songpa in Seoul, South Korea.

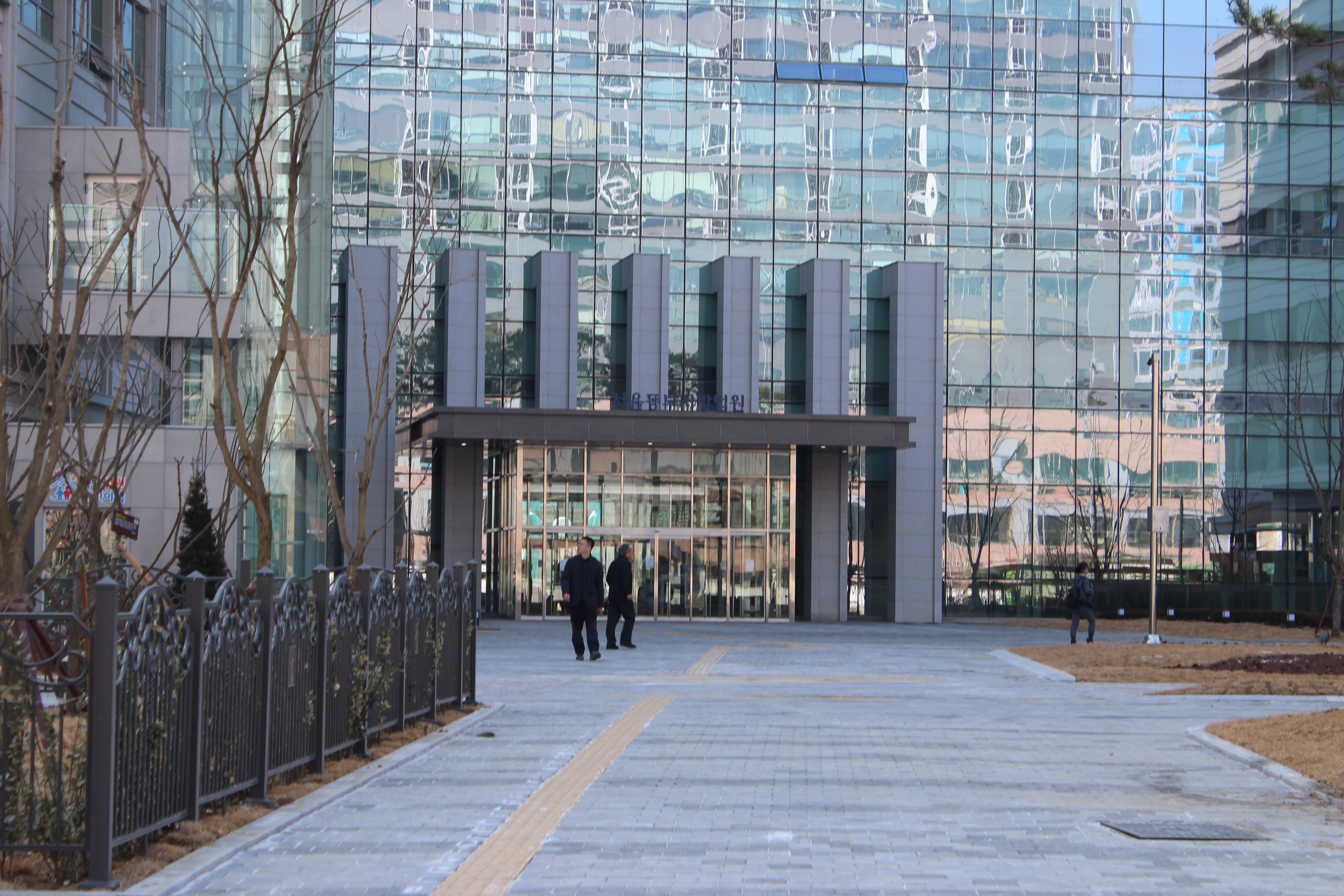
Entrance to the Seoul Eastern District Court

== History ==
The court was established on September 1, 1971.
