= Supreme Court of Korea =

Highest ordinary court of South Korea

Coordinates: 37.4922°N 127.0052°E

- 대한민국 대법원
- Symbol of the Supreme Court of Korea

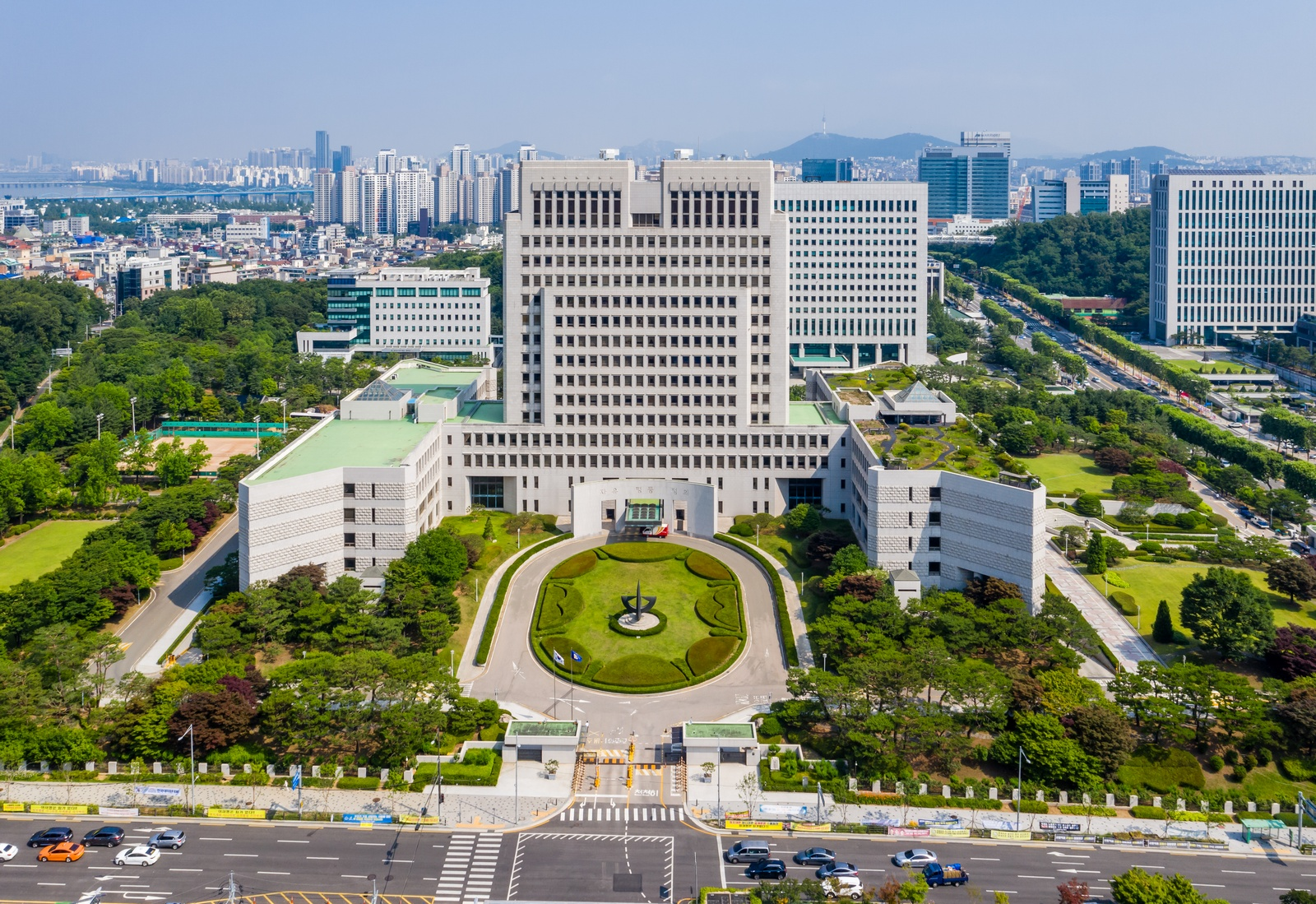
- Supreme Court of Korea in Seocho-gu, Seoul
- Interactive map of Supreme Court of Korea
- Established: 1948; 78 years ago
- Location: Seocho, Seoul
- Composition method: Appointed by president with consent of National Assembly (for associate justices, nomination of chief justice is additionally required)
- Authorised by: Constitution of South Korea Chapter V
- Judge term length: Six years, renewable (mandatory retirement at the age of 70)
- Number of positions: 14 (by statute)
- Website: scourt.go.kr

Chief Justice
- Currently: Jo Hee-de
- Since: 8 December 2023

- Supreme Court of Korea
- Emblem of ordinary courts of Korea

Korean name
- Hangul: 대법원
- Hanja: 大法院
- RR: Daebeobwon
- MR: Taebŏbwŏn

The Supreme Court of Korea (Korean: 대법원; Hanja: 大法院) is the highest ordinary court in the judicial branch of South Korea, seated in Seocho, Seoul. Established under Chapter 5 of the Constitution of South Korea, the court has ultimate and comprehensive jurisdiction over all cases except those falling under the jurisdiction of the Constitutional Court of Korea. It consists of 13 associate justices, and the only chief justice. The Supreme Court sits atop all ordinary courts in South Korea and has traditionally represented the conventional judiciary of South Korea. The Supreme Court of Korea is one of the two apex courts in South Korea, the other being the Constitutional Court of Korea.

== History ==
The original constitution during the First Republic established 'Supreme Court' and 'Constitutional Committee' (헌법위원회) in Chapter 5. The Supreme Court was established as the highest ordinary court but lacked the power of constitutional review, which was conferred upon the Constitutional Committee, a sort of constitutional court. This distribution of judicial power inside the judiciary was never fully realized under President Syngman Rhee, whose dictatorship hampered the committee's function and eventually left it unable to re-constitute itself. Though the Supreme Court had no power of judicial review, it enjoyed judicial independence under the first chief justice of the Supreme Court, Kim Byung-ro (김병로), from 1948 to 1957. Known for his participation in the Korean independence movement during the Japanese colonial rule, Chief Justice Kim Byung-ro defended the independence of the judiciary from Syngman Rhee.

However, after Kim Byung-ro's retirement in 1957, the Supreme Court fell to autocratic influence. By sentencing Rhee's political contender Cho Bong-am to death in 1959, and the defendants of People's Revolutionary Party Incident to death in 1975, the Supreme Court gained notoriety for judicial murder (사법살인) and obediently sentencing capital punishments over spy scandals fabricated by dictators. After the April Revolution, the Constitutional Court was established to replace the Constitutional Committee, but the Supreme Court remained largely unaffected by the changes. After Park Chung Hee's 1961 coup, the Second Republic was dissolved and, after a nominal transition to civilian rule from a military junta, the Third Republic was established in 1962. The Constitutional Court, itself never formed because of the coup, was abolished, and the power of judicial review was transferred to the Supreme Court. Nevertheless, the Supreme Court maintained deference toward the dictator. In 1971, the Supreme Court resisted the oppressive rule of President Park Chung Hee and declared Article 2 of the National Compensation Act (국가배상법) unconstitutional, a statute that limited state liability for injured soldiers during service. President Park retaliated by refusing reappointment of Supreme Court justices, which had been a formality. The Fourth and Fifth Republics would grant a new, differently formed Constitutional Committee with the power of constitutional review but on the condition that an ordinary court first formally submit a request before the committee could hear a case. This extra procedural hurdle was meant to nullify the committee, since the Supreme Court would never authorize such requests for fear of reprisal, while allowing the Park Chung Hee regime to maintain the pretense that it granted the committee full constitutional-review power. It effectively allowed the dictatorial regime to act with impunity. Following 1987 democratization, the Constitutional Court was restored in the Sixth Republic, with the power of constitutional review. To prevent the president from undermining the judiciary again, the 1987 constitutional amendment, which established the Sixth Republic, allows citizens to file a constitutional complaint directly with the Constitutional Court, even if courts refuse to do so.

In 2015, the Organisation for Economic Co-operation and Development ranked the South Korean ordinary judiciary to be one of the most efficient in terms of trial length and trial costs.

== Composition ==
=== Justices ===
The Court Organisation Act outlines the structure of courts in the country.

The President of South Korea appoints all 14 Supreme Court justices, subject to approval by the National Assembly. The chief justice of the Supreme Court also has the authority to recommend candidates for appointment.

To be eligible for appointment, individuals must be at least 45 years of age, qualify as an attorney at law, and have accumulated over 20 years of experience in legal practice or academia.

==== Expansion of Supreme Court to 26 justices ====
On 28 February 2026, the South Korean National Assembly passed an amendment to the Court Organization Act, expanding the Supreme Court from 14 justices to 26. The government will appoint four new justices a year for three years from 2028. The changes were then approved by the State Council of South Korea on 5 March 2026.

Supporters justified the expansion to ease a chronic case backlog at the Supreme Court (40,000 substantive cases in 2025, averaging roughly 3,500 cases per justice), reduce reliance on summary dismissals without full review and to better protect citizens' right to a fair trial, while critics called the measure a court-packing scheme.

==== Council of Supreme Court Justices ====
According to Article 104 Clause 2 of the constitution, the appointment of lower ordinary court judges (판사), by the chief justice of the Supreme Court requires the consent of the 'Council of Supreme Court Justices' (대법관회의). This council consists of all Supreme Court justices, including the chief justice. The decision-making process of the council is governed by Article 16 Clause 1, Clause 2, and Clause 3 of the Court Organization Act.

To reach a decision, a simple majority vote among a quorum of two-thirds of all Supreme Court justices is required. In the event of a tie, the chief justice, serving as the permanent presiding chair of the council, has the authority to cast a tie-breaking vote. Article 17 of the Court Organization Act further empowers the council with additional supervisory functions concerning the chief justice's power of court administration.

These functions include the promulgation of interior procedural rules, the selection of judicial precedents for publication, and fiscal planning for all ordinary courts, including the Supreme Court itself. In essence, the Council of Supreme Court Justices serves as a mechanism for collective decision-making and oversight within the Supreme Court, ensuring the fair and effective administration of justice while upholding the principles of transparency and accountability.

=== Chief Justice of the Supreme Court ===
According to Article 104 Clause 1 of the constitution, the chief justice of the Supreme Court is appointed by the president of South Korea, subject to the approval of the National Assembly. The requirements for experience and age for the chief justice are the same as those stipulated for associate Supreme Court justices under Article 42 Clause 1 of the Court Organization Act.

The role of the chief justice extends beyond serving as the presiding member of en banc hearings (or Grand Bench, 전원합의체), which are composed of more than two-thirds of all 14 justices. In addition to this crucial responsibility, the chief justice has other significant functions.

Under Article 111 Clause 3 of the constitution, the chief justice nominates candidates for three out of the nine Constitutional Court justices. Furthermore, the chief justice serves as the chairperson of the Council of Supreme Court Justices.

Moreover, the chief justice appoints one of the associate Supreme Court justices to the position of Minister of National Court Administration (법원행정처). This appointment involves selecting a justice to fulfill the administrative duties associated with managing the national court system. Additionally, with the consent of the Council of Supreme Court Justices, the chief justice appoints all lower court judges in ordinary courts.

=== Tenure ===
Article 105 Clause 1, Clause 2, and Clause 4 of the constitution, along with Article 45 Clause 4 of the Court Organization Act, outline the term of associate justices of the Supreme Court. Their term is initially set at six years and can be renewed until the mandatory retirement age of 70. However, in the current Sixth Republic, no justices have attempted to renew their term through reappointment. This is due to the potential risk to the judicial independence of the court that may arise from such renewal attempts.

During their term, as stated in Article 106 Clause 2 of the constitution, justices cannot be removed from office except through impeachment or a sentence of imprisonment. Furthermore, engaging in any political party affiliations or activities is strictly prohibited under Article 43(1) and 49 of the Court Organization Act.

A significant aspect of Supreme Court justices is that they can be compelled to retire against their will while serving their term if they are deemed to have severe mental or physical impairment. This retirement order (심신장해로 인한 퇴직명령) is explicitly stipulated in Article 106 Clause 2 of the constitution and Article 47 of the Court Organization Act. Similarly, the chief justice of the Supreme Court has the authority to order the retirement of lower ordinary court judges if they are found to have impairments. This retirement order system represents a significant distinction between Supreme Court justices and Constitutional Court justices. The latter cannot be ordered to retire due to impairment, as there is no statutory provision establishing such a system in the Constitutional Court Act.

=== Current justices ===
Name	Born	Appointed by	Recommended by	Education	First day / Length of service
Jo Hee-de (Chief Justice)	June 6, 1957 (age 69) in Gyeongju	Yoon Suk Yeol	Nominated by the President of the Republic of Korea subject to the National Assembly's approval	Seoul National University	December 8, 2023 / 2 years, 10 months
Chun Daeyup	February 6, 1964 (age 62) in Busan	Moon Jae-in	Kim Myeong-soo	Seoul National University	May 8, 2021 / 5 years, 5 months
Oh Kyeong-mi	December 16, 1968 (age 57) in Iksan	Moon Jae-in	Kim Myeong-soo	Seoul National University	September 17, 2021 / 5 years, 1 month
Oh Seok-joon	October 29, 1962 (age 64) in Paju	Yoon Suk Yeol	Kim Myeong-soo	Seoul National University	November 25, 2022 / 3 years, 11 months
Suh Kyeong-hwan	February 22, 1966 (age 60) in Seoul	Yoon Suk Yeol	Kim Myeong-soo	Seoul National University	July 19, 2023 / 3 years, 3 months
Kwon Young Joon	October 14, 1970 (age 56) in Seoul	Yoon Suk Yeol	Kim Myeong-soo	Seoul National University	July 19, 2023 / 3 years, 3 months
Eom Sang Phil	December 1, 1968 (age 57) in Jinju	Yoon Suk Yeol	Jo Hee-de	Seoul National University	February 29, 2024 / 2 years, 8 months
Shin Sukheui	March 4, 1969 (age 57) in Seoul	Yoon Suk Yeol	Jo Hee-de	Seoul National University	February 29, 2024 / 2 years, 8 months
Noh Gyeongpil	October 1, 1964 (age 62) in Haenam	Yoon Suk Yeol	Jo Hee-de	Seoul National University	August 2, 2024 / 2 years, 3 months
Park Young Jae	February 5, 1969 (age 57) in Busan	Yoon Suk Yeol	Jo Hee-de	Seoul National University	August 2, 2024 / 2 years, 3 months
Lee Sook-yeon	August 14, 1968 (age 58) in Incheon	Yoon Suk Yeol	Jo Hee-de	Korea University	August 6, 2024 / 2 years, 3 months
Ma Yongjoo	July 1, 1969 (age 57) in Hapcheon	Han Duck-soo	Jo Hee-de	Seoul National University	April 9, 2025 / 1 year, 6 months
Kim Seong-soo	August 26, 1968 (age 58) in Hampyeong	Lee Jae Myung	Jo Hee-de	Hanyang University	September 18, 2026 / 1 month

== Organization ==
=== Research judges ===
The research division of the Supreme Court (재판연구관) comprises officials who provide support to the Supreme Court justices. These officials, referred to as research judges (formerly known as judicial researchers or research judges), are governed by Article 24 Clause 3 of the Court Organization Act.

There are two categories of research judges. The first category consists of lower ordinary court judges who are seconded to the Supreme Court by order of the chief justice. The second category, known as judicial researchers, comprises experts who are not lower ordinary court judges. Judicial researchers are appointed for a maximum term of three years, while research judges are typically seconded to work in the Supreme Court for one to two years.

This system of research judges and judicial researchers is influenced by the German concept of "Wissenschaftlichen Mitarbeiter" (Research Associates). In Germany, Research associates are lower court judges who are seconded to federal courts for up to five years, serving as judicial assistants to judges in the highest courts.

Although the working terms for these research staff members are relatively short, they play a crucial role as core staff members in managing the entire judicial process of the court. This is particularly important considering the high volume of cases appealed to the court. As of April 2022, there are approximately 100 research judges and around 30 judicial researchers contributing to the operations of the Supreme Court.

=== National Court Administration ===
The 'National Court Administration' (NCA, 법원행정처), was established as an administrative body of the Supreme Court in accordance with Article 67 of the Court Organization Act. The NCA is responsible for overseeing and managing all administrative matters pertaining to the ordinary courts in South Korea, including the Supreme Court itself.

The head of the NCA, referred to as the 'Minister of NCA' (법원행정처장), is exclusively appointed by the chief justice of the Supreme Court from among the associate Supreme Court justices. Similar to other Supreme Court justices, the minister is regarded as holding the same level of authority as other ministers included in the State Council in the executive branch of the South Korean government.

Additionally, the chief justice typically appoints the vice minister of NCA, usually selecting a senior lower court judge for the position. The vice minister of NCA is treated at the same level as other vice ministers within the government structure.

The NCA operates under the guidance and direction of the chief justice and implements decisions made by the Council of Supreme Court justices. Its primary responsibilities include assisting the chief justice in matters related to human resources for lower ordinary court judges, planning fiscal budgets and managing expenditure issues for all ordinary courts, and conducting internal inspections to ensure anti-corruption and ethical standards are upheld.

=== Judicial Research and Training Institute ===
The 'Judicial Research and Training Institute' (JRTI, 사법연수원 (司法硏修院)), is an institution primarily responsible for training and re-educating lower ordinary court Judges, as outlined in Article 72 of the Court Organization Act. However, its role has evolved over time.

Originally, the JRTI served as a nationwide two-year law school supported by the South Korean government. This was prior to South Korea adopting the American-style three-year law school system in 2008 (법학전문대학원). Before the adoption of the American law school system, the JRTI played a vital role in training legal professionals in South Korea. Another pathway for legal professionals was recruitment by the South Korean Armed Forces as 'judge advocates' (군법무관) within the military justice system.

The JRTI was initially modeled after the 'Legal Research and Training Institute' (Japanese: 司法研修所) in Japan, which trained judges, prosecutors, and attorneys-at-law simultaneously. In South Korea, candidates for the JRTI were selected through a nationwide jurisprudence examination (Korean: 사법시험). These trainees underwent a two-year training program at the JRTI, where they received education and competed with one another. The career options available to them after graduation were influenced by their performance and records at the JRTI. Graduates with outstanding records typically pursued careers as judges and prosecutors, while those with lower records often chose to work as lawyers in various fields. This system partially reflected the civil law tradition of considering prosecutors as a de facto part of the judiciary as the deputy director (or vice-president) of the JRTI is appointed among prosecutors according to Article 74 Clause 1 of the Court Organization Act. Similar arrangements can be observed in institutions like the French National School for the Judiciary.

With the adoption of the American-style three-year law school system in South Korea, the JRTI's role as the exclusive professional school for law diminished. It transformed into an internal education institute for newly appointed judges and law clerks. Some senior judges also receive additional training at the JRTI for technical matters. Currently, all training functions for prosecutors have been transferred to the 'Institute of Justice' (법무연수원) at the Ministry of Justice, signifying a change in the training structure for legal professionals in South Korea.

=== Judicial Policy Research Institute ===
The 'Judicial Policy Research Institute' (JPRI, 사법정책연구원), was established in 2014 under Article 76-2 of the Court Organization Act. It serves as a specialized body within the Supreme Court of South Korea, focusing on research related to policy issues concerning the judicial system. Additionally, the JPRI plays a role in educating the public on fundamental aspects of the functioning of ordinary courts.

The institute primarily recruits research fellows and researchers from the pool of lower ordinary court judges, as outlined in the provisions of Article 76 Clause 4 of the Court Organization Act. However, a significant number of researchers are also recruited externally from individuals who possess PhD degrees and have expertise relevant to the field of judicial policy research. This diverse recruitment strategy enhances the institute's ability to gather insights and perspectives from both within and outside the ordinary courts.

Currently, the JPRI is located in Goyang, Gyeonggi Province, providing a dedicated space for its research activities and initiatives.

=== Training Institute for Court Officials ===
The Training Institute for Court Officials (TICO) is the specialized educational institution established under the jurisdiction of the Supreme Court of Korea, responsible for planning and providing training and development programs for court administrative personnel such as clerks, registrars, and enforcement officers. It was established pursuant to Article 21 of the Court Organization Act, which stipulates that "in order to take charge of affairs concerning the training and education of court personnel, execution officers, etc., the Court Officials Training Institute shall be established in the Supreme Court."

Training Institute for Court Officials' core mission is to enhance the professionalism, competence, and ethical standards of court staff, thereby ensuring that the judiciary's administrative functions maintain high quality service and contribute to the fair and efficient administration of justice. To achieve this goal, the institute designs curricula for basic induction training of newly appointed officials, organizes in-service and leadership programs for different career levels, develops educational materials, conducts evaluations, and collaborates with domestic and international judicial training bodies. As an affiliated organization of the Supreme Court, it serves as a hub for continuous learning and capacity building in judicial administration.

According to the regulations on the Training Institute for Court Officials (법원공무원규칙), Training Institute for Court Officials' organization and operations are formally governed by Supreme Court rules. The regulations define its objectives, organizational structure, training management, completion criteria, and commendation procedures. Article 25 sets specific requirements for course attendance and completion, and Article 26 authorizes the Director to commend outstanding trainees. This legal framework ensures that the institute operates as a systematic and accountable training organization rather than a simple in-house academy.

Training Institution for Court Officials offers a multi-tiered curriculum tailored to different career stages and responsibilities. Basic Training introduces new employees to the court system, procedural law, administrative practice, and ethics. Intermediate and practical courses cover topics such as civil and criminal procedure, judgment and register drafting, case date management, and enforcement operations. Advanced programs for senior staff include seminars on court administration strategy, digital transformation of the judiciary, human-resource leadership, and international judicial cooperation. Special programs also provide short term or customized training for specific job categories and exchange initiatives for foreign judicial professionals.

The main campus is located in central Goyang-si, Gyeonggi-do, spans approximately 39,000 square meters and is equipped with educational infrastructure, including lecture halls, auditoriums, residential dormitories, and research facilities, thereby supporting its training schedule. Through this structure and legal foundation, the Training Institute for Court Officials serves as a core institution to ensure the Korean judicial administration remain professional and adapts to the demands of modern justice.

== Building ==
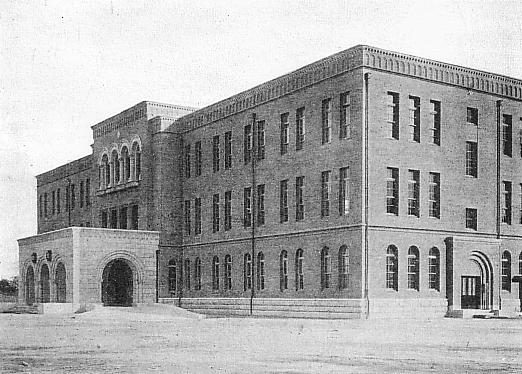
The Supreme Court was located in Jung District, Seoul, until the 1990s. The building currently houses the Seoul Museum of Art.

The Supreme Court was located in Seosomun-dong, Seoul until 1995. Currently, it is located in Seocho, Seoul. The Supreme Court building in Seocho has 16 floors and two underground floors with total space around 66,500 square meters. This large size building was necessary to hold the Supreme Court, National Court Administration and law library all together. The main center of the building is used by the Supreme Court, while east wing is mainly used by National Court Administration. Other wing is used by law library. At the center entrance of the building, three Korean words are engraved; 자유 meaning freedom, 평등 meaning equality, and 정의 meaning justice. The Supreme Court usually does not hold open hearing session, though sessions for verdicts are regularly held on the second and last Thursday of a month.

Current Supreme Court building from 1995 in Seocho, Seoul

== Judicial administration ==
The Supreme Court of Korea not only functions as the highest appellate body for ordinary courts in the Republic of Korea but also plays a central role in the administration of the judiciary. Judicial administration refers to the management of human resources, budget and accounting, facilities, and other organizational aspects that ensure the courts operate efficiently and effectively. Because the court has supervisory jurisdiction over all ordinary courts, its administrative functions are crucial to maintaining the independence, fairness, and adaptability of the judicial system.

At the top of this administrative structure is the chief justice, who has general authority over judicial administrative affairs. The chief justice directs and supervises the official concerned with administration and my delegate parts of the authority to the National Court Administration, to chief judges of lower courts, or to the presidents of affiliated institutions such as the Judicial Research and Training Institute or the Supreme Court Library. Important administrative matters are deliberated by the Council of Supreme Court Justices, which consists of all justices of the court and is presided over by the chief justice. A resolution of the council requires more than two-thirds of the justices to be present and a majority vote of those present. The council's responsibilities include appointment of lower court judges, establishment or revision of Supreme Court rules and regulations, publication of judicial precedents, budget requests, and settlement of accounts.

Judicial administration under the court encompasses several major domains. First, personnel management includes the appointment, evaluation, transfer and retirement of judges and court officials. Lower court judges are appointed by the chief justice with the consent of the council. Second, budgetary and financial affairs involve preparing budget proposals for all ordinary courts, overseeing reserve fund expenditures, and ensuring accountability through audit and settlement procedures. Third, physical and technological infrastructure, such as court buildings, IT systems (e-Court Services), case management databases and research libraries, are managed to support the judicial process and facilitate timely, public oriented services. The e-Court system is actively promoted through the court's website to increase transparency and accessibility. Fourth, rule making and precedent publication form another key area in which the court may establish internal rules and regulations concerning judicial business, disciplinary matters, and court administration so long as they are not inconsistent with statutes. Such rules must be approved via resolutions of the council.

The administrative role of the court has been evolving in response to changes in caseloads, advances in information technology, and demands for transparency and accountability. Through the council, the court monitors and sets policies on strategic matters such as the digitization of court procedures, the standardization of case processing, the strengthening of communication with the public, and international cooperation in judicial administration. These efforts aim to ensure that the judiciary remains adaptive to social, technological and global shifts. The court explicitly states that "fair trials trusted by the people" is its top priority.

In practice, when a major new regulation concerning court procedure or database system is proposed, it is submitted to the Council of Supreme Court Justices for formal resolution, after which the National Court Administration coordinates implementation across all ordinary courts. The chief justice, as chair of the council, thus occupies a dual role, serving in both adjudicative and administrative capacities. The court thereby fulfills a meta-court function, overseeing not only final appeals but also the overall health of the judiciary as an institution.

In sum, the judicial administration function of the Supreme Court of Korea is integral to the delivery of justice. By supervising personnel, budgets, facilities, rules and policy across the entire ordinary court system, the court ensures structural coherence and operational efficiency. Its governance via the Council of Supreme Court Justices, backed by legal authority and administrative machinery, enables the judiciary to maintain independence while responding to modern demands. This blended role of adjudication and administration distinguishes the court in its capacity as both final arbiter and institutional steward of the ordinary courts in Korea.

== Jurisdiction ==
According to Article 101 Clause 2 and Article 110 Clause 2 of the constitution, the Supreme Court of South Korea possesses comprehensive final appellate jurisdiction over all cases from ordinary courts and military courts. Additionally, it exercises the power of judicial review at the sub-statutory level, similar to other ordinary courts, as specified in Article 107 Clause 2 of the constitution. Notably, the Supreme Court exclusively handles certain cases as single-tier trials, without the possibility of appeal.

One category of cases subject to single-tier trials in the Supreme Court pertains to disputes related to the election of the president of South Korea, National Assembly members, provincial-level local governors, and local parliament members. These cases are governed by Article 222 and 223 of the Public Official Election Act (공직선거법), which designates the Supreme Court as the sole authority responsible for adjudication.

Another example of single-tier trials at the Supreme Court involves cases concerning disciplinary actions against judges for misconduct. According to Article 27 Clause 2 of the Discipline of Judges Act (법관징계법), such cases are exclusively heard by the Supreme Court.

== Procedure ==
As outlined in Article 7 Clause 1 of the Court Organization Act, the Supreme Court carries out its final appellate jurisdiction through two distinct phases. The first phase is known as the 'Petty Bench,' which consists of a smaller panel within the court. The Petty Bench is presided over by the most senior justice serving within that particular panel.

The second phase is referred to as the 'Grand Bench,' which operates as an en banc session of the court. The Grand Bench is always presided over by the chief justice of the Supreme Court. During these sessions, all justices of the Supreme Court come together to deliberate on cases and make decisions.

=== Four-judge panels and en banc hearings ===
In the initial phase of the procedure, a four-judge panel (or "Petty Bench," 소부) examines how the appeal should be handled. If the four justices within the same panel reach a unanimous decision, the case is resolved within the panel. However, in cases where the panel fails to reach a unanimous decision or determines that the matter should be heard en banc (such as when overturning a Supreme Court precedent or when addressing a significant constitutional issue at a sub-statutory level), the case is referred for an en banc hearing (or "Grand Bench," 전원합의체).

Given that the court has three four-judge panels, only twelve out of the 14 Supreme Court justices participate in the first phase of the procedure. The remaining two Supreme Court justices – the chief justice and the minister of National Court Administration – hold administrative roles within the court but are not assigned to any specific panel.

In the second phase, an en banc hearing ( "Grand Bench," 전원합의체), comprising more than two-thirds of all Supreme Court justices, examines cases forwarded by the four-judge panels. Decisions are made by a simple majority vote. However, if a majority opinion cannot be reached, the court's decision is determined in accordance with Article 66 of the Court Organization Act.

In either phase, the Supreme Court does not adjudicate facts but rather deliberates based on the evidence introduced in lower-court trials. Unlike the fact-finding nature of the lower courts, the Supreme Court only examines whether there are errors in the application of law and logic in the decisions of the lower courts regarding the specific case. Therefore, the role of the Supreme Court is to review the decisions of the lower courts and not to issue new judgments.

The Supreme Court primarily issues two types of rulings: affirming the lower court's decision (원심확정) or remanding the case (파기환송). Remanding, in simple terms, refers to the act of overturning a lower court's decision and sending the case back for a retrial. In such cases, the lower court is bound by the legal principles highlighted by the Supreme Court. Unless new factual circumstances arise that challenge those legal principles, the lower court must render a decision as directed by the Supreme Court. Consequently, a "verdict of acquittal with a remand for retrial" is considered final, even though it necessitates a new trial at the lower court.

=== Presiding justice and justice in charge ===
In South Korea, judicial panels include a 'presiding member' (재판장) and a 'member in charge' (주심). The presiding member serves as the official representative of the panel, while the member in charge oversees the proceedings and trial and prepares the draft judgment for the specific case at hand. This role of the member in charge bears similarities to that of the judge-rapporteur in the European Court of Justice.

Typically, the member in charge is selected randomly by a computer system to ensure impartiality and avoid any suspicion of bias. On the other hand, the presiding member is chosen based on seniority through a bureaucratic process. The term 'presiding judge' (부장판사) in South Korean courts often refers to a judge who is bureaucratically considered the 'head of the panel' rather than the individual who actively takes on the role of the presiding member for a specific case.

=== Case naming ===
South Korea's Supreme Court follows a specific naming convention for current cases. The case name consists of a combination of numbers and alphabets that provide information about the case. The first two or four digits represent the year when the case was filed, indicating the timeframe in which the legal proceedings began. Following the year, a case code composed of alphabets is assigned, which corresponds to a particular jurisdiction within the court.

For instance, the letter 'Da' is used to denote cases related to private law, while the letter 'Du' is used for criminal law cases. This case code helps categorize and classify the types of cases being heard by the court. Finally, the last serial number is assigned based on the order of case filing within a given year, ensuring a unique identification for each case.

== Statistics ==
Between 2011 and 2020, the Supreme Court received approximately 35,000 to 48,000 appeal cases annually. However, under current law, the South Korean Supreme Court is not permitted to deny a petition for review (상고허가; see certiorari) at its discretion.

South Korea previously operated a certiorari-like system, established in March 1981 under the Special Act on Acceleration of Lawsuits (소송촉진 특례법). The Special Act authorized the Supreme Court to dismiss cases deemed insignificant or not warranting further review. However, because the South Korean legal system is fundamentally based on a three-tiered system (i.e., allowing appeals up to twice), this practice was criticized as a potential infringement on the right to a fair trial. The certiorari system was ultimately abolished in September 1990.

Currently, when a petition for review is filed, the Supreme Court must convene a panel of four justices. The panel may unanimously decide to affirm the lower court's decision, remand the case, or, if the matter requires further consideration, refer it to an en banc hearing.

The institutional structure of the Supreme Court places a significant burden on its justices. Each year, the court handles a large volume of cases, typically ranging from 35,000 to 50,000. Of these, only a small fraction, approximately 10 to 20 cases annually, are selected for en banc hearings (전원합의체). As a result, the vast majority of cases are resolved without en banc review and often receive limited deliberation. According to former Supreme Court justice Park Sihwan, decisions in such cases may be reached in as little as "3 to 4 minutes." Consequently, research judges play an essential role, providing detailed legal analysis and support for cases that do not proceed to the en banc stage.

Potential reforms to the South Korean judicial system continue to generate controversy and debate. Several proposals have been advanced to address existing challenges, including increasing the number of Supreme Court justices, reintroducing the certiorari system (상고허가제), and establishing an additional tier of appellate courts (상고법원) positioned between the current appellate courts and the Supreme Court. This intermediate appellate courts would be tasked with handling cases not selected for review by the Supreme Court.

The proposal to establish an additional tier of appellate courts became particularly contentious during the tenure of former chief justice Yang Sung-tae. Yang was accused of influence-peddling during Park Geun-hye's presidency. Specifically, he was alleged to have intervened in a case in a manner favorable to the president in exchange for the creation of the proposed appellate courts (상고법원). He was arrested in 2019, and the trial remains ongoing as of May 2023.

== Criticism and issues ==
- The Supreme Court has faced criticism for perceived leniency toward chaebols as well as controversy over internal political conflicts within the judiciary. Notably, the court came under public scrutiny following a case-rigging scandal involving Yang Sung-tae, the 15th chief justice.
- Both the constitution and the Court Organization Act lack contingency plans for mass vacancies on the Supreme Court. As a result, if the National Assembly is gridlocked over recommending candidates for Supreme Court justices under Article 104 Clause 1 and Clause 2 of the constitution, there is no alternative, and the Supreme Court becomes paralyzed due to the absence of justices. A similar problem exists with the Constitutional Court of Korea – to a greater extent – because the constitution and relevant statutes impose a higher quorum requirement for the Constitutional Court to render a decision upholding a law. Under Article 66 Clause 1 of the Court Organization Act, the Supreme Court may decide cases by a simple majority. In contrast, the Constitutional Court requires the concurrence of at least six justices to uphold a law, pursuant to Article 113 Clause 1 of the constitution.

== See also ==
- Chief Justice of the Supreme Court of Korea
- Politics of South Korea
- Government of South Korea
- Judiciary of South Korea
- Constitutional Court of Korea
