= Choi Se-chang =

South Korean military officer and politician

- 최세창
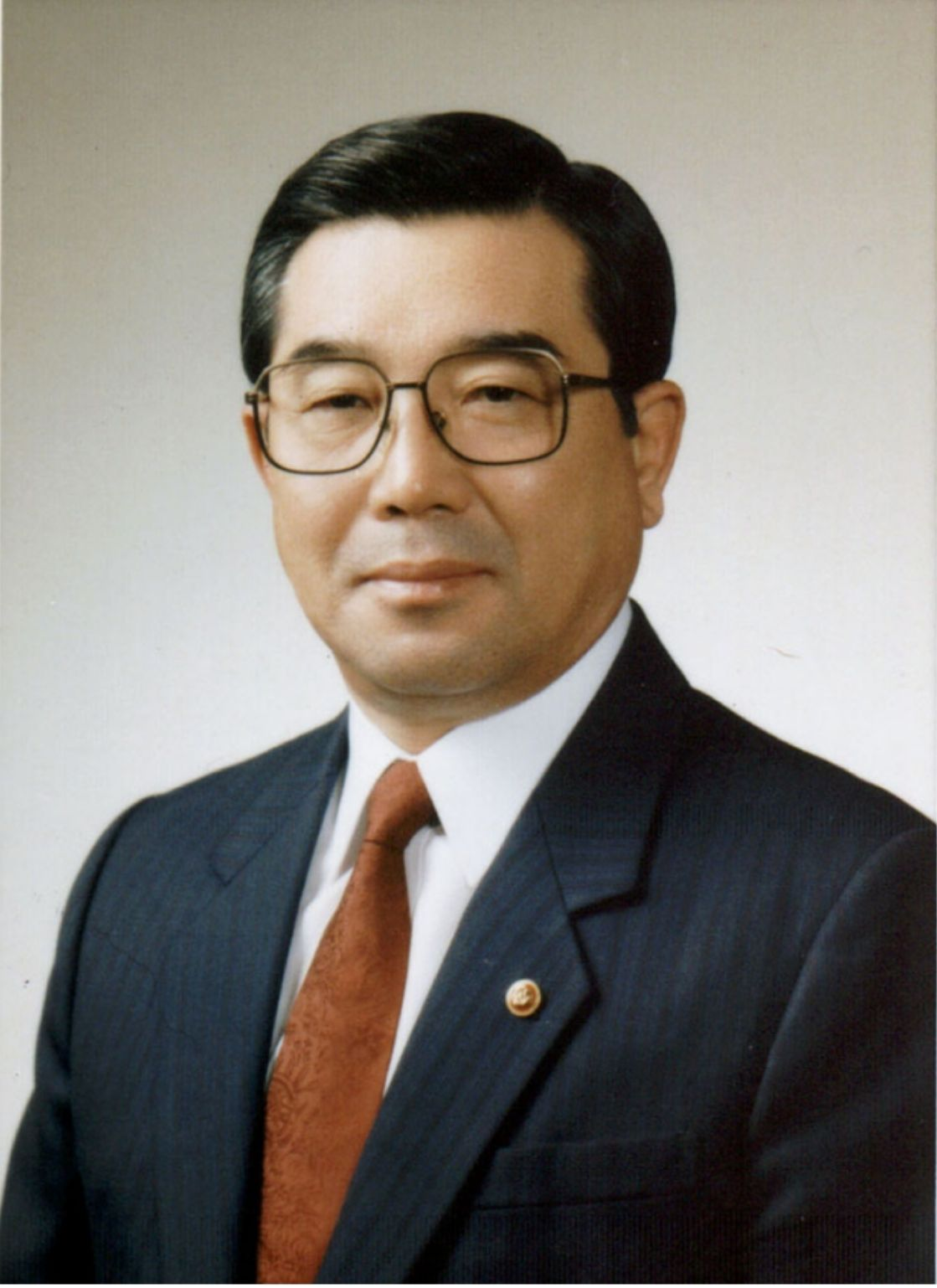

Minister of National Defense
- In office 20 December 1991 – 26 February 1993
- President: Roh Tae-woo
- Preceded by: Lee Jong-gu
- Succeeded by: Kwon Young-hae

Chairman of the Joint Chiefs of Staff
- In office 30 December 1987 – 14 April 1989
- Preceded by: Oh Ja-bok
- Succeeded by: Chung Ho-keun

Personal details
- Born: 17 April 1934 (age 92) Daegu, Korea, Empire of Japan
- Citizenship: South Korean
- Party: Democratic Justice Party; Democratic Liberal Party
- Education: Korea Military Academy; ROK Army Infantry School; Korea National Defense University; Hanyang University
- Occupation: Military officer, politician

Military service
- Allegiance: South Korea
- Branch/service: Republic of Korea Army
- Rank: Jiang (General)

Choi Se-chang (Korean: 최세창; born April 17, 1934) is a South Korean military officer and politician who served, among others as Minister of National Defense. His ancestral clan is the Gyeongju Choi clan, and his pen name is Yugwang (維光).

== Biography ==
He graduated from Kyungdong Middle School in Seoul in 1953 and later on graduated from the Republic of Korea Army Infantry School. He holds Bachelor of Arts, Korea Military Academy in 1957, Bachelor of Public Administration, Korea National Defense University and Master of Public Administration from the Hanyang University Graduate School of Public Administration.

In 1977, he was appointed commander of the 3rd Airborne Special Forces Brigade. During the military insurrection of December 12, 1979, he served as a key figure within the Hanahoe and commanded the 3rd Airborne Special Forces Brigade.

On May 20, 1980, he ordered the distribution and use of live ammunition by the 3rd Airborne Special Forces Brigade, which had been deployed to suppress the Gwangju Uprising. Throughout his subsequent career, he held various high-ranking positions, including division commander, commander of the ROK Army I Corps, deputy chief of staff of the Army, commander of the Third ROK Army, Chairman of the Joint Chiefs of Staff, president of the Korea Mining Promotion Corporation and Minister of National Defense. On April 17, 1997, the Supreme Court sentenced him to five years in prison for his role in the 1979 South Korean coup d'état and the suppression of the Gwangju Uprising—specifically for participating in the conspiracy to commit insurrection and for the attempted murder of a superior officer. He was later granted a pardon on August 15, 1998.

Much like Park Hee-do, he is characterized as a "political soldier"—an officer who focused primarily on navigating the promotion process rather than professional military duties. He was one of the individuals who directed and oversaw the massacre of innocent civilians in Gwangju during the May 18 Gwangju Democratization Movement—an act that rendered him entirely unfit to be a soldier. Nevertheless, under the protection of the Hanahoe and Chun Doo-hwan, he managed to rise to the position of Minister of National Defense during the Roh Tae-woo administration. However, upon taking office as president, Kim Young-sam—who was well aware of his past—promptly dismissed Choi Se-chang from his post as Minister of National Defense.
