= Kim Dong-jin (politician) =

South Korean military officer and politician

- 김동진
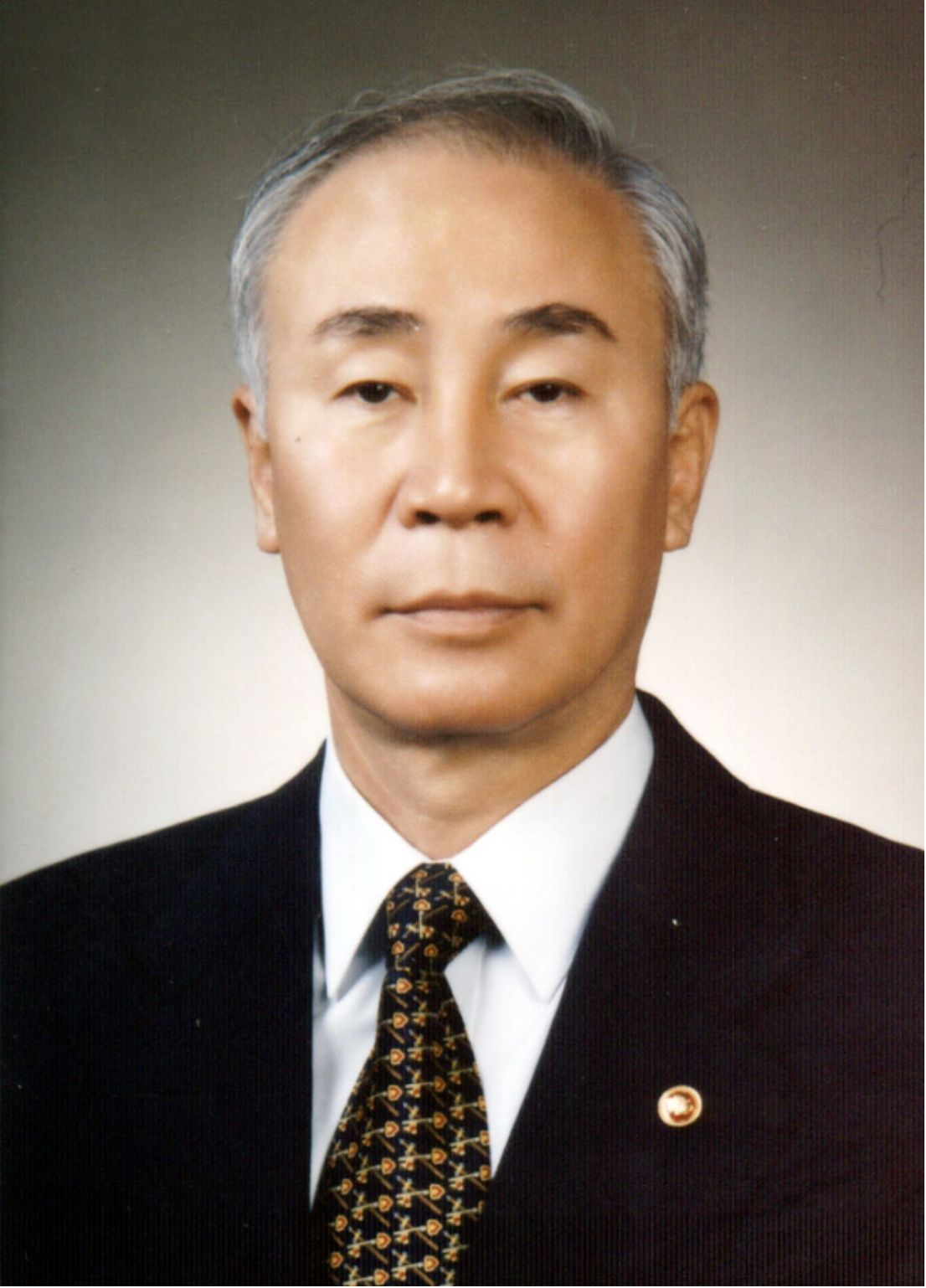

Minister of National Defense
- In office 18 October 1996 – 3 March 1998
- President: Kim Young-sam; Kim Dae-jung
- Preceded by: Lee Yang-ho
- Succeeded by: Chun Yong-taek

Chairman of the Joint Chiefs of Staff
- In office 24 December 1994 – 18 October 1996
- Preceded by: Lee Yang-ho
- Succeeded by: Yoon Yeoug-nam

Chief of Staff of the ROK Army
- In office 9 March 1993 – 26 December 1994
- Preceded by: Kim Jin-young
- Succeeded by: Yoon Yong-nam

Personal details
- Born: 9 September 1937 (age 89) Seoul, Japanese-controlled Korea
- Citizenship: South Korean
- Party: United Liberal Democrats
- Education: Kyungbock High School; Korea Military Academy
- Occupation: Military officer, politician

Military service
- Allegiance: South Korea
- Branch/service: Republic of Korea Army
- Rank: Jiang (General)

Kim Dong-jin (Korean: 김동진; born 10 October 1938) is a retired South Korean Army general and politician who served as the 33rd Minister of National Defense of the Republic of Korea from 18 October 1996 to 3 March 1998, during the presidency of Kim Young-sam.

== Biography ==
Kim Dong-jin was born on 10 October 1938 in Seoul, then part of Japanese-occupied Korea. He attended Kyungbock High School, one of South Korea's established secondary educational institutions. In 1957, he entered the Korea Military Academy as a member of its 17th graduating class. He also studied at the ROK Army Infantry School and at the Korea National Defense University. He graduated in 1961 from the Korea Military Academy and was commissioned as a second lieutenant in the Republic of Korea Army. Kim subsequently pursued further academic education in the United States. He studied English literature at Georgetown University in Washington, D.C., where he obtained a master's degree.

Following his graduation from the Korea Military Academy in 1961 he served in various infantry, command, staff and defense-policy positions including commander of the 61st Infantry Regiment, 20th Infantry Division, commander of the 1st Infantry Division, commander of the V Corps, senior official in the Ministry of National Defense's policy and planning establishment, deputy commander of the Combined Forces Command.

In March 1993, Kim became the 30th chief of staff of the ROK Army. In December 1994, Kim was appointed Chairman of the Joint Chiefs of Staff. His chairmanship coincided with an important period in the evolution of South Korea's military command arrangements following the transfer of peacetime operational control from the United States in December 1994. Kim held the position until October 1996, when he was appointed Minister of National Defense. In his first public remarks as defense minister, he emphasized the need to respond firmly to North Korean infiltration attempts, improve military morale and strengthen the armed forces' non-material capabilities, including discipline, professionalism and combat motivation on the background of the North Korean submarine infiltration incident of September 1996. Kim's ministerial tenure ended on 3 March 1998, following the inauguration of President Kim Dae-jung in February and he was succeeded by Chun Yong-taek.
