= Lee Yang-ho =

South Korean military officer and politician

- 이양호
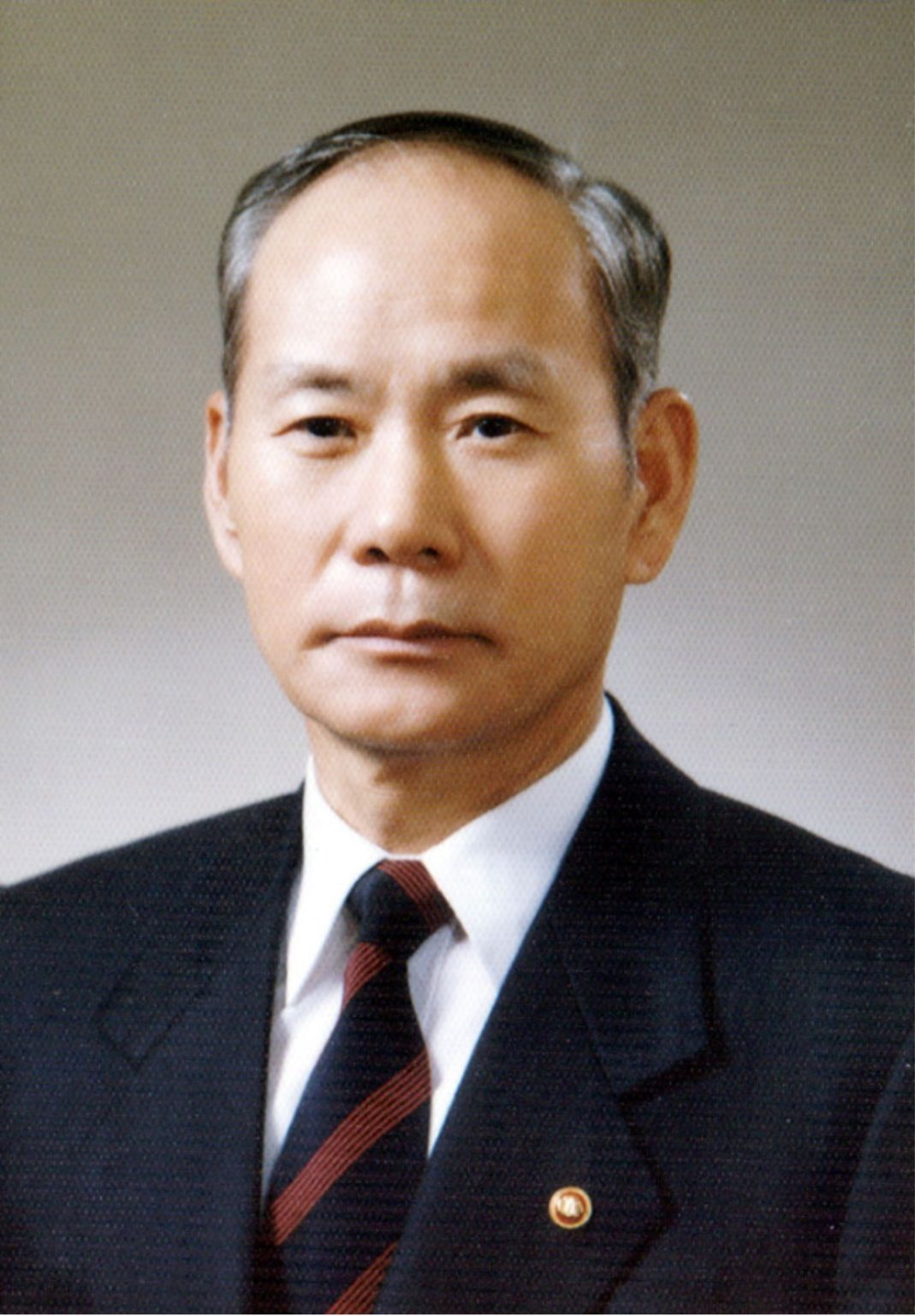

Minister of National Defense
- In office 24 December 1994 – 18 October 1996
- President: Kim Young-sam
- Preceded by: Lee Byung-tae
- Succeeded by: Kim Dong-jin

Chairman of the Joint Chiefs of Staff
- In office 29 May 1993 – 24 December 1994
- Preceded by: Lee Phil-sup
- Succeeded by: Kim Dong-jin

Chief of Staff of the Republic of Korea Air Force
- In office 8 September 1992 – 27 May 1993
- Preceded by: Han Chu-sok
- Succeeded by: Cho Kun-hae

Personal details
- Born: 9 September 1937 North Chungcheong Province, Korea, Empire of Japan
- Died: 28 May 2020 (aged 82) Seoul, South Korea
- Resting place: Seoul National Cemetery
- Citizenship: South Korean
- Party: United Liberal Democrats
- Education: Korea Air Force Academy; ROK Army Infantry School; Air University; Korea National Defense University; Seoul National University
- Occupation: Military officer, politician

Military service
- Allegiance: South Korea
- Branch/service: Republic of Korea Air Force
- Rank: Daejiang (General)

Lee Yang-ho (Korean: 이양호; 1937–2020) was a South Korean military officer and politician who served as the 32nd Minister of National Defense of South Korea from December 1994 to October 1996.

== Biography ==
Lee Yang-ho was born in 1937 in Jeungpyeong, in what is now North Chungcheong Province, South Korea. He studied at the Ochang Elementary School alumni and at the Cheongju Middle School He entered the Korea Air Force Academy and graduated in 1960 as a member of its eighth graduating class. He was commissioned as an Air Force officer in the same year. Following his commissioning in 1960, Lee served in several operational and command positions within the Republic of Korea Air Force including commander of the 101st Fighter Squadron, commander of the 16th Fighter Wing, superintendent-level and senior command responsibilities in the Air Force training establishment, commander of the Air Force Education and Training Command in 1988 and commander of the Air Force Operations Command in 1989. In September 1992, Lee was appointed the 21st chief of staff of the Republic of Korea Air Force. One of Lee's principal priorities was the development of what he described as a future-oriented Air Force.

In May 1993, Lee was appointed chairman of the Joint Chiefs of Staff. This appointment was historically significant: he became the first officer from the Republic of Korea Air Force to occupy the position. One of the most important developments during Lee's chairmanship was the transfer of peacetime operational control of South Korean forces from the United States to the Republic of Korea. The transfer took effect on 1 December 1994. Before the transfer, the United States exercised significant operational authority over South Korean forces through the combined command arrangements established after the Korean War. The change represented an important step toward greater South Korean military autonomy.

On 24 December 1994, Lee became the 32nd minister of national defense, succeeding Lee Byung-tae, becoming the third minister of national defense in South Korean history to come from the Air Force. Lee's tenure ended abruptly on 18 October 1996, when President Kim Young-sam replaced him with Kim Dong-jin. The dismissal took place following a period of controversy involving national defense policy and military discipline. The government presented the personnel change as part of an effort to restore discipline and improve the military's institutional atmosphere. Observers connected the decision with criticism surrounding the North Korean submarine infiltration incident and other security-related controversies, including public statements concerning the Northern Limit Line.
