= Cho Seong-tae =

South Korean military personnel

- 조성태
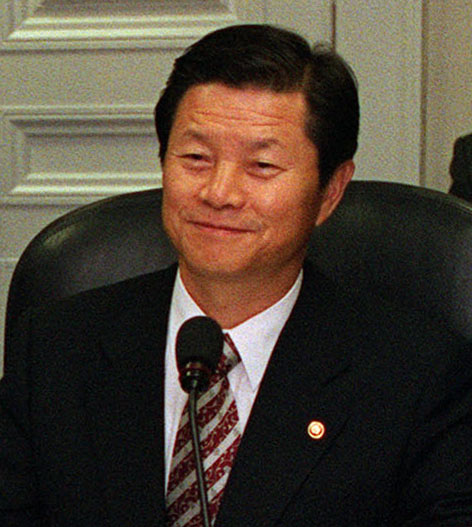

Minister of National Defense
- In office 24 May 1999 – 26 March 2001
- Preceded by: Chun Yong-taek
- Succeeded by: Kim Dong-shin

Member of the National Assembly
- In office 30 May 2004 – 29 May 2008

Personal details
- Born: 3 November 1942 Wando County, Korea, Empire of Japan
- Died: 14 August 2021 (aged 78)
- Citizenship: South Korean
- Party: Uri Party; Democratic Party
- Other political affiliations: National Congress for New Politics; United Liberal Democrats; Democratic Party
- Education: Korea Military Academy; Korea National Defense University

Military service
- Allegiance: South Korea
- Branch/service: Republic of Korea Army
- Rank: Jiang (General)
- Battles/wars: First Battle of Yeonpyeong

Cho Seong-tae (Korean: 조성태; November 3, 1942 – August 14, 2021) was a South Korean military officer and politician who served as the 35th Minister of National Defense and as a member of the 17th convocation of the National Assembly.

== Biography ==
He was a member of the Hanyang Cho clan and was born in Cheonan, South Chungcheong Province. He studied in Pungse Elementary School and then at Cheonan Middle School. During his military service he studied at the Republic of Korea Army Infantry School. After graduating from the Korea Military Academy (20th class) and receiving his commission in 1964, he held various high-ranking positions, including commander of the I Corps, commander of the II Corps, and deputy minister for policy at the Ministry of National Defense. He retired from the military with the rank of general in 1996. Subsequently, he served as a visiting professor at the Korea National Defense University. From May 1999 to 2001, he served as the 35th minister of national defense.

He is credited with taking appropriate follow-up measures following the First Battle of Yeonpyeong, which occurred on June 15, 1999—about a month after he took office. He directed the deployment of K9 self-propelled howitzers—which were considered state-of-the-art weaponry at the time—to Baengnyeongdo and Yeonpyeongdo islands.

In 2000, he represented South Korea at the first inter-Korean defense ministerial meeting since the division of the peninsula, where he held talks with Kim Il-chol, the North Korean Minister of the People's Armed Forces. In 2004, he was nominated as a proportional representative candidate and served as a member of the 17th National Assembly.

In August 1999, while visiting China, then-Minister of National Defense Cho Sung-tae stated during a conversation with Chinese military officers on the 25th that, in the event of Korean unification, South Korea would be open to discussing the issue of the withdrawal of United States Forces Korea with nations in Northeast Asia, including China.

When a Chinese officer asked how the presence of U.S. forces would be handled—noting that there are no foreign troops in North Korea—Minister Cho replied that if genuine peaceful coexistence were achieved between the two Koreas, the presence of U.S. forces would take on a form entirely different from the current one. He indicated that, following unification, the status of U.S. forces—including the possibility of their withdrawal—could be discussed with other countries, including China.

Furthermore, Minister Cho expressed a desire to develop military relations between South Korea and China to a level comparable to those South Korea maintains with the United States and Japan. He also remarked that, should South Korea and China expand their exchanges and cooperation, unification could potentially be achieved early in the 21st century. When asked whether the U.S.-Japan Theater Missile Defense system might negatively impact peace in Northeast Asia, he countered by pointing to North Korea's missile launches as the root cause. Additionally, Minister Cho emphasized that both South Korea and China believe unification is not worth the cost of bloodshed, advocating instead for unification through dialogue.

Following this, Cho issued a clarification, stating, "I regret that my remarks inadvertently caused controversy". At a press conference held at the time, Minister Cho clarified his previous remark—that the issue of U.S. forces in Korea following reunification should be decided by the unanimous consent of neighboring countries, explaining that it had been a diplomatic response based on the assumption that those neighbors would likely align with South Korea's position, which unfortunately led to a misunderstanding.

His son, Cho Yong-geun, is a brigadier general in the ROK Army and, as of August 2021, was serving as the director general for North Korea Policy at the Ministry of National Defense. Controversy Over Remarks Regarding the Withdrawal of U.S. Forces in Korea During a 1999 visit to China
