= Joo Young-bok =

- 주영복
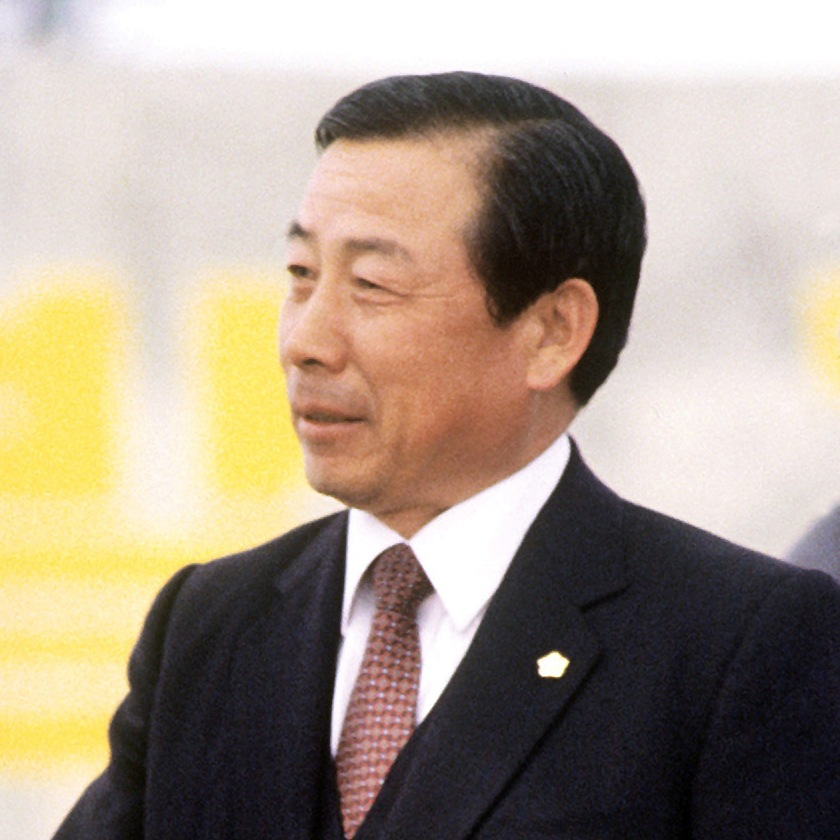
- Bok in 1982

Minister of Home Affairs
- In office 7 July 1983 – 18 February 1985
- President: Chun Doo-hwan
- Preceded by: Roh Tae-woo
- Succeeded by: Chung Suk-mo

Minister of National Defense
- In office 14 December 1979 – 21 May 1982
- President: Choi Kyu-hah; Chun Doo-hwan
- Preceded by: Roh Jae-hyun
- Succeeded by: Yoon Sung-min

Chief of Staff of the ROK Air Force
- In office 1 August 1974 – 13 April 1979
- Preceded by: Ok Man-ho
- Succeeded by: Yoon Ja-jung

Personal details
- Born: 30 September 1927 Japanese-controlled Korea
- Died: 14 March 2005 (aged 77) National Cancer Center in Ilsan, Goyang, Gyeonggi-do
- Resting place: Dobong District, Seoul
- Citizenship: South Korean
- Party: Independent
- Education: Dankook University; Korea Air Force Academy; National Defense College

Military service
- Allegiance: South Korea
- Branch/service: Republic of Korea Air Force
- Rank: Jang (General)
- Battles/wars: Korean War

Joo Young-bok (Korean: 주영복; September 30, 1927 – March 14, 2005) was a South Korean military officer and politician who served as Minister of National Defense.

== Biography ==
Born in Haman, Gyeongsangnam-do, on September 30, 1927, he was a member of the Sangju Joo clan.

After graduating from Ogimachi Commercial Middle School in Osaka, Japan, he completed his training at the Tachiarai Army Flight School in Japan in 1945.

In 1949, he was commissioned as a second lieutenant in the Republic of Korea Air Force as part of the 8th class of Air Force officer candidates. In 1950, he was commissioned again as a first lieutenant through the 2nd intake of the Korea Air Force Academy.

He earned a bachelor’s degree in law from Dankook University in 1959 and a master’s degree from the National Defense College in 1963.

Throughout his career, he held key positions, including Inspector General of the Air Force, Director of Operations at Air Force Headquarters, Director of Personnel at Air Force Headquarters, Commander of the 11th and 10th Fighter Wings, Superintendent of the Air Force Academy, Commander of the Air Force Logistics Command, Vice Chief of Staff of the Air Force, Commander of the Air Force Operations Command, and Chief of Staff of the Air Force from 1974 to 1979. He retired from military service in April 1979.

He served as the longest-tenured Chief of Staff of the Republic of Korea Air Force.

Following the 1979 South Korean coup d'état, in which a new military faction led by Chun Doo-hwan seized de facto power, Joo became Minister of National Defense and was involved in the armed suppression of the Gwangju Uprising. After stepping down as Minister of National Defense in 1982, he served as Minister of Home Affairs. In April 1997, he was sentenced by the Supreme Court to seven years in prison for his role in the 1979 South Korean coup d'état and the May 18 Gwangju Democratization Movement— specifically for carrying out key tasks during the insurrection and the act of rebellion—but he was later granted a pardon.
