= Chief of Staff of the Republic of Korea Army =

Head of the South Korean army

- 대한민국 육군참모총장
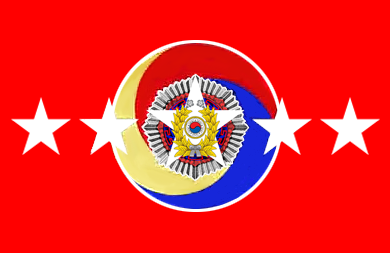
- Flag of the Chief of Staff

- Incumbent; General Kim Kyu-ha since 2 September 2025
- Ministry of National Defense
- Abbreviation: CSA
- Member of: Joint Chiefs of Staff
- Reports to: Chairman of the Joint Chiefs of Staff
- Appointer: The president
- Formation: January 15, 1946; 80 years ago
- First holder: Won Yong-deok
- Deputy: Vice Chief of Staff of the Republic of Korea Army

The chief of staff of the Republic of Korea Army (CSA; Korean: 대한민국 육군참모총장; Hanja: 大韓民國陸軍參謀總長), is the head of the Republic of Korea Army (ROKA). The position has existed since the founding of the ROKA in 1948, and was originally held by a lieutenant general, then by a general since 1968.

The appointment of the CSA, along with the chief of naval operations, chiefs of staff of the Air Force and the chairman of the Joint Chiefs of Staff, is referred to the State Council of South Korea for deliberation according to Article 89, Constitution of South Korea.

== List of chiefs ==
=== Commander of the Army ===
No.	Portrait	Name (Birth–Death)	Term of office			Ref.
No.	Portrait	Name (Birth–Death)	Took office	Left office	Time in office	Ref.
1		Lieutenant general Won Yong-deok (1908–1968)	15 January 1946	13 December 1946	332 days	–
2		Brigadier general Song Ho-seong (1889–1959)	13 December 1946	20 November 1948	1 year, 343 days	–
3		Lieutenant general Lee Eung-jun (1890–1985)	20 November 1948	15 December 1948	25 days	–

=== Chief of Staff of the Army ===
No.	Portrait	Chief of Staff of the Army	Took office	Left office	Time in office
1	Lee Eung-jun [ko]	Major general Lee Eung-jun (1890–1985)	15 December 1948	8 May 1949	144 days
2	Chae Byong-duk	Major general Chae Byong-duk (1916–1950)	9 May 1949	30 September 1949	144 days
3	Shin Tae-young	Major general Shin Tae-young (1891–1959)	1 October 1949	9 April 1950	190 days
4	Chae Byong-duk	Major general Chae Byong-duk (1916–1950)	10 April 1950	29 June 1950	80 days
5	Chung Il-kwon	Major general Chung Il-kwon (1917–1994)	30 June 1950	22 June 1951	357 days
6	Lee Jong-chan	Major general Lee Jong-chan (1916–1983)	23 June 1951	22 July 1952	1 year, 29 days
7	Paik Sun-yup	Lieutenant general Paik Sun-yup (1920–2020)	23 July 1952	13 February 1954	1 year, 205 days
8	Chung Il-kwon	General; Chung Il-kwon (1917–1994)	14 February 1954	26 June 1956	2 years, 133 days
9	Lee Hyung-geun	General; Lee Hyung-geun (1920–2002)	27 June 1956	17 May 1957	324 days
10	Paik Sun-yup	General; Paik Sun-yup (1920–2020)	18 May 1957	22 February 1959	1 year, 280 days
Int.	Lee Hyung-geun	General; Lee Hyung-geun (1920–2002)	23 February 1959	6 August 1959	164 days
11	Song Yo-chan	Lieutenant general Song Yo-chan (1918–1980)	7 August 1959	22 May 1960	289 days
12	Choi Young-hee	Lieutenant general Choi Young-hee (1921–2006)	23 May 1960	28 August 1960	97 days
13	Choi Gyeong-rok [ko]	Lieutenant general Choi Gyeong-rok (1920–2002)	29 August 1960	16 February 1961	171 days
14	Chang Do-yong	Lieutenant general Chang Do-yong (1923–2012)	17 February 1961	5 June 1961	108 days
15	Kim Jong-oh	General; Kim Jong-oh (1921–1966)	6 June 1961	31 May 1963	1 year, 359 days
16	Min Gi-sik [ko]	General; Min Gi-sik (1921–1998)	1 June 1963	31 March 1965	1 year, 303 days
17	Kim Yong-bae [ko]	General; Kim Yong-bae (1923–2006)	1 April 1965	1 September 1966	1 year, 153 days
18	Kim Gye-won [ko]	General; Kim Gye-won (1923–2016)	2 September 1966	31 August 1969	2 years, 363 days
19	Seo Jong-chul	General; Seo Jong-chul (1924–2010)	1 September 1969	1 June 1972	2 years, 274 days
20	Roh Jae-hyun	General; Roh Jae-hyun (1926–2019)	2 June 1972	28 February 1975	2 years, 271 days
21	Lee Se-ho	General; Lee Se-ho (1925–2013)	1 March 1975	31 January 1979	3 years, 336 days
22	Jeong Seung-hwa	General; Jeong Seung-hwa (1929–2002)	1 February 1979	12 December 1979	314 days
23	Lee Hui-seong	General; Lee Hui-seong (1924–2022)	13 December 1979	15 December 1981	2 years, 2 days
24	Hwang Young-si [ko]	General; Hwang Young-si (1926–2022)	16 December 1981	15 December 1983	1 year, 364 days
25	Chung Ho-yong	General; Chung Ho-yong (1932–2026)	16 December 1983	15 December 1985	1 year, 364 days
26	Park Hee-do	General; Park Hee-do (born 1934)	16 December 1985	11 June 1988	2 years, 178 days
27	Lee Jong-gu	General; Lee Jong-gu (born 1935)	12 June 1988	10 June 1990	1 year, 363 days
28	Lee Jin-sam	General; Lee Jin-sam (born 1937)	11 June 1990	5 December 1991	1 year, 177 days
29	Kim Jin-young	General; Kim Jin-young (born 1938)	6 December 1991	8 March 1993	1 year, 92 days
30	Kim Dong-jin	General; Kim Dong-jin (born 1938)	9 March 1993	26 December 1994	1 year, 292 days
31	Yoon Yong-nam	General; Yoon Yong-nam (1940–2021)	27 December 1994	18 October 1996	1 year, 296 days
32	Do Il-gyu	General; Do Il-gyu (born 1940)	19 October 1996	27 March 1998	1 year, 159 days
33	Kim Dong-shin	General; Kim Dong-shin (born 1941)	28 March 1998	2 October 1999	1 year, 188 days
34	Gil Hyeong-bo	General; Gil Hyeong-bo (born 1942)	3 October 1999	12 October 2001	2 years, 9 days
35	Kim Pan-gyu	General; Kim Pan-gyu (born 1943)	13 October 2001	6 April 2003	1 year, 175 days
36	Nam Jae-jun	General; Nam Jae-jun (born 1944)	7 April 2003	7 April 2005	2 years, 0 days
37	Kim Jang-soo	General; Kim Jang-soo (born 1948)	7 April 2005	7 November 2006	1 year, 214 days
38	Park Heung-ryeol	General; Park Heung-ryeol (born 1949)	17 November 2006	21 March 2008	1 year, 125 days
39	Lim Choung-bin	General; Lim Choung-bin (born 1950)	21 March 2008	21 September 2009	1 year, 184 days
40	Han Min-goo	General; Han Min-goo (born 1951)	21 September 2009	18 June 2010	270 days
41	Hwang Ui-don	General; Hwang Ui-don (born 1953)	18 June 2010	14 December 2010	179 days
42	Kim Sang-ki	General; Kim Sang-ki (born 1952)	16 December 2010	11 October 2012	1 year, 300 days
43	Cho Jung-hwan	General; Cho Jung-hwan (born 1955)	11 October 2012	28 September 2013	352 days
44	Kwon Oh-sung	General; Kwon Oh-sung (born 1955)	28 September 2013	11 August 2014	317 days
45	Kim Yo-hwan	General; Kim Yo-hwan (born 1956)	11 August 2014	17 September 2015	1 year, 37 days
46	Jang Jun-kyu	General; Jang Jun-kyu (born 1957)	17 September 2015	11 August 2017	1 year, 328 days
47	Kim Yong-woo	General; Kim Yong-woo (born 1961)	11 August 2017	16 April 2019	1 year, 248 days
48	Suh Wook	General; Suh Wook (born 1962)	16 April 2019	18 September 2020	1 year, 155 days
49	Nam Yeong-shin	General; Nam Yeong-shin (born 1962)	23 September 2020	27 May 2022	1 year, 246 days
50	Park Jeong-hwan	General; Park Jeong-hwan (born 1966)	27 May 2022	31 October 2023	1 year, 157 days
51	Park An-su	General; Park An-su (born 1968)	31 October 2023	12 December 2024	1 year, 42 days
–	Go Chang-jun	General; Go Chang-jun (born 1968); Acting	12 December 2024	2 September 2025	264 days
–		General; Kim Kyu-ha (born 1968)	2 September 2025	31 October 2025	59 days
52		General; Kim Kyu-ha (born 1968)	31 October 2025	Incumbent	1 year, 14 days

== See also ==
- Joint Chiefs of Staff (South Korea)
  - Chief of Naval Operations (South Korea)
  - Chief of Staff of the Air Force (South Korea)
- Republic of Korea Army
- Republic of Korea Armed Forces
- South Korea
