= Chairman of the Joint Chiefs of Staff (South Korea) =

Military officer

- 대한민국 합동참모의장
- Insignia of the Joint Chiefs of Staff

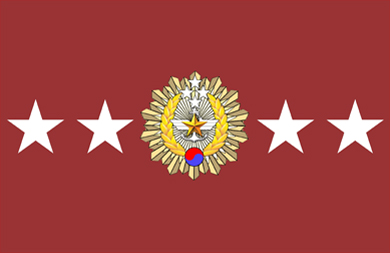
- Flag of the chairman of the Joint Chiefs of Staff

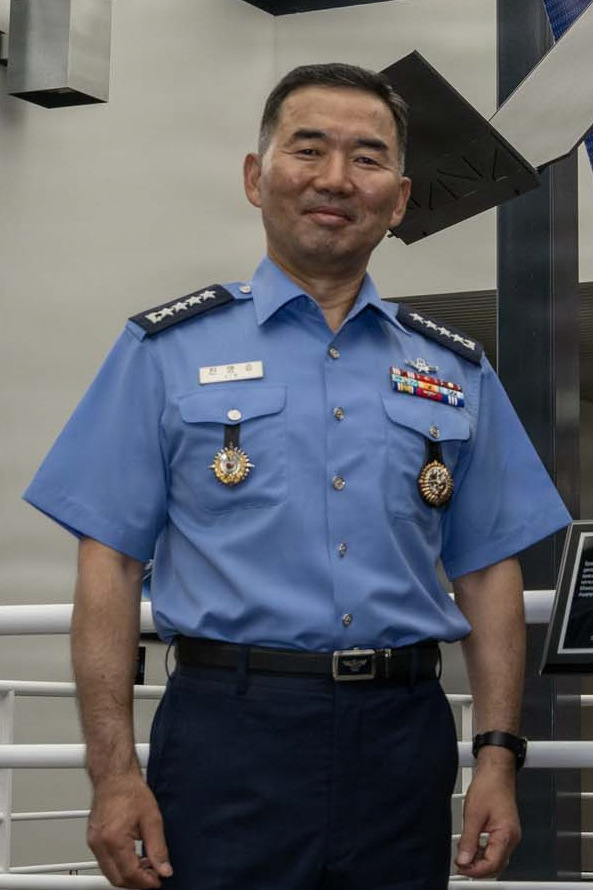
- Incumbent; General Jin Young Seung, ROKAF since 30 September 2025
- Joint Chiefs of Staff
- Member of: Joint Chiefs of Staff
- Reports to: President of South Korea; Minister of National Defense
- Residence: 22, Itaewon-ro, Yongsan, Seoul, South Korea
- Seat: 22, Itaewon-ro, Yongsan, Seoul, South Korea
- Nominator: President of South Korea with approval of the National Assembly
- Appointer: President of South Korea
- Formation: 17 February 1954; 72 years ago
- First holder: General Lee Hyong-kon
- Deputy: Deputy Chairman of the Joint Chiefs of Staff
- Website: jcs.mil.kr

The Chairman of the Joint Chiefs of Staff (Korean: 대한민국 합동참모의장; Hanja: 大韓民國合同參謀議長; RR: Daehanminguk habdongchammouijang) is the highest-ranking and most senior military officer in the Republic of Korea Armed Forces. The position was based to its US Armed Forces Chairman of the Joint Chiefs of Staff but has operational differences. Unlike its US counterpart, the Chairman possesses full administrative and operational control of the entire armed forces and its overall operational commands (Army, Air Force, Navy-Marine Corps).

In accordance with Article 9, Paragraph 2 of the Armed Forces Organization Act, the Chairman of the Joint Chiefs of Staff is responsible for assisting the Ministry of National Defense in the creation of commands, strategies, and doctrines related to national security and defense throughout the country. The Chairman also prescribes orders and directions to all the members of the Joint Chiefs of Staff, namely the Chief of Staff of the Republic of Korea Army, the Chief of Naval Operations, and the Chief of Staff of the Air Force on various defense matters and oversees the entire organizational and operational activities of the armed forces. The Chairman harmonizes coordination, joint planning, and preparedness of all armed forces commands and has the power to initiate various programs towards the military. The Chairman serves as the primary advisor to the President of South Korea, who serves as the Commander-in-chief of the armed forces, and executes the President's directives and orders regarding military-related affairs in both peacetime and wartime.

== Organization and Roles ==
The Chairman of the Joint Chiefs of Staff, being the highest-ranking officer of the armed forces, is appointed by the President of South Korea upon the advice and selection of the Minister of National Defense. The President's nominee for the post will also need the consent and approval of the National Assembly before allowing the nominee to take over their position. The Chairman of the Joint Chiefs of Staff is also assisted by the Vice Chairman of the Joint Chiefs of Staff, who serves as the Chairman's primary assistant in conceptualization and implementation of military policies and can take over the post as Chairman in case of the Chairman's absence.

== List ==
Previous chairmen have been:

=== Chairman of the Combined Chiefs of Staff ===
| No. | Portrait | Chairman of the Combined Chiefs of Staff | Took office | Left office | Time in office | Defence branch | Republic |
|---|---|---|---|---|---|---|---|
| 1 | Lee Hyung-geun | General; Lee Hyung-geun (1920–2002) | 17 February 1954 | 27 June 1956 | 2 years, 131 days | Army | 1st Republic |
| 2 | Chung Il-kwon | General; Chung Il-kwon (1917–1994) | 27 June 1956 | 18 May 1957 | 325 days | Army | 1st Republic |
| 3 | Yu Jae-hung | Lieutenant General; Yu Jae-hung (1921–2011) | 18 May 1957 | 26 February 1959 | 1 year, 284 days | Army | 1st Republic |
| 4 | Paik Sun-yup | General; Paik Sun-yup (1920–2020) | 26 February 1959 | 31 May 1960 | 1 year, 95 days | Army | 1st Republic |
| (3) | Yu Jae-hung | Lieutenant General; Yu Jae-hung (1921–2011); Acting | 31 May 1960 | 29 August 1960 | 90 days | Army | 2nd Republic |
| 5 | Choi Young-Hee | Lieutenant General; Choi Young-Hee (1921–2006) | 29 August 1960 | 8 October 1960 | 40 days | Army | 2nd Republic |
| 6 | Kim Jong-oh | General; Kim Jong-oh (1921–1966) | 8 October 1960 | 6 June 1961 | 241 days | Army | 2nd Republic |

=== Director of the Joint Staff ===
| No. | Portrait | Director of the Joint Staff | Took office | Left office | Time in office | Defence branch | Republic |
|---|---|---|---|---|---|---|---|
| 7 | Kim Jong-oh | General; Kim Jong-oh (1921–1966) | 6 June 1961 | 1 June 1963 | 1 year, 360 days | Army | 2nd Republic |

=== Chairman of the Joint Chiefs of Staff ===
| No. | Portrait | Chairman of the Joint Chiefs of Staff | Took office | Left office | Time in office | Defence branch | President |
|---|---|---|---|---|---|---|---|
| 8 | Kim Jong-oh | General; Kim Jong-oh (1921–1966) | 1 June 1963 | 10 April 1965 | 1 year, 313 days | Army | Park Chung Hee |
| 9 | Jang Chang-guk | General; Jang Chang-guk (1924–1996) | 10 April 1965 | 10 April 1967 | 2 years, 9 days | Army | Park Chung Hee |
| 10 | Im Chung-sik | General; Im Chung-sik (1922–1974) | 10 April 1967 | 5 August 1968 | 1 year, 117 days | Army | Park Chung Hee |
| 11 | Moon Hyeung-tae | General; Moon Hyeung-tae (1922–2006) | 7 August 1968 | 6 August 1970 | 1 year, 364 days | Army | Park Chung Hee |
| 12 | Sim Heung-sun | General; Sim Heung-sun (1925–1978) | 6 August 1970 | 2 June 1972 | 1 year, 301 days | Army | Park Chung Hee |
| 13 | Han shin | General; Han shin (1922–1996) | 2 June 1972 | 28 February 1975 | 2 years, 271 days | Army | Park Chung Hee |
| 14 | Roh Jae-hyun | General; Roh Jae-hyun (1926–2019) | 28 February 1975 | 29 December 1975 | 2 years, 304 days | Army | Park Chung Hee |
| 15 | Kim Jong-hwan | General; Kim Jong-hwan (1923–2022) | 29 December 1975 | 15 December 1979 | 1 year, 351 days | Army | Park Chung Hee; Choi Kyu-hah |
| 16 | Lew Byong-hyun | General; Lew Byong-hyun (1924–2020) | 15 December 1979 | 15 May 1981 | 1 year, 151 days | Army | Choi Kyu-hah; Chun Doo-hwan |
| 17 | Yoon Sung-min | General; Yoon Sung-min (1926–2017) | 15 May 1981 | 21 May 1982 | 1 year, 6 days | Army | Chun Doo-hwan |
| 18 | Kim Yoon-ho | General; Kim Yoon-ho (1930–2013) | 21 May 1982 | 3 June 1983 | 1 year, 13 days | Army | Chun Doo-hwan |
| 19 | Lee Gee-baek | General; Lee Gee-baek (1931–2019) | 3 June 1983 | 3 June 1985 | 2 years, 0 days | Army | Chun Doo-hwan |
| 20 | Jung Jin-kwon | General; Jung Jin-kwon (born 1928) | 3 June 1985 | 9 July 1986 | 1 year, 36 days | Army | Chun Doo-hwan |
| 21 | Oh Ja-bok | General; Oh Ja-bok (1930–2017) | 9 July 1986 | 30 December 1987 | 1 year, 174 days | Army | Chun Doo-hwan |
| 22 | Choi Se-chang | General; Choi Se-chang (born 1934) | 30 December 1987 | 14 April 1989 | 1 year, 105 days | Army | Chun Doo-hwan; Roh Tae-woo |
| 23 | Chung Ho-keun | General; Chung Ho-keun (1933–2003) | 14 April 1989 | 7 December 1991 | 2 years, 237 days | Army | Roh Tae-woo |
| 24 | Lee Phil-sup | General; Lee Phil-sup (born 1937) | 7 December 1991 | 29 May 1993 | 1 year, 173 days | Army | Roh Tae-woo; Kim Young-sam |
| 25 | Lee Yang-ho | General; Lee Yang-ho (1937–2020) | 29 May 1993 | 24 December 1994 | 1 year, 209 days | Air Force | Kim Young-sam |
| 26 | Kim Dong-jin | General; Kim Dong-jin (born 1938) | 24 December 1994 | 18 October 1996 | 1 year, 299 days | Army | Kim Young-sam |
| 27 | Yoon Yeoug-nam | General; Yoon Yeoug-nam (1940–2021) | 18 October 1996 | 26 March 1998 | 1 year, 159 days | Army | Kim Young-sam; Kim Dae-jung |
| 28 | Kim Jin-ho | General; Kim Jin-ho (born 1941) | 26 March 1998 | 26 October 1999 | 1 year, 214 days | Army | Kim Dae-jung |
| 29 | Cho Yung-kil | General; Cho Yung-kil (born 1940) | 26 October 1999 | 8 October 2001 | 1 year, 347 days | Army | Kim Dae-jung |
| 30 | Lee Nam-shin | General; Lee Nam-shin (born 1944) | 8 October 2001 | 7 April 2003 | 1 year, 181 days | Army | Kim Dae-jung; Roh Moo-hyun |
| 31 | Kim Jong-hwan | General; Kim Jong-hwan (born 1946) | 7 April 2003 | 7 April 2005 | 2 years, 0 days | Army | Roh Moo-hyun |
| 32 | Lee Sang-hee | General; Lee Sang-hee (1945–2026) | 7 April 2005 | 17 November 2006 | 1 year, 224 days | Army | Roh Moo-hyun |
| 33 | Kim Kwan-jin | General; Kim Kwan-jin (born 1949) | 17 November 2006 | 25 March 2008 | 1 year, 129 days | Army | Roh Moo-hyun; Lee Myung-bak |
| 34 | Kim Tae-young | General; Kim Tae-young (1949–2025) | 28 March 2008 | 23 September 2009 | 1 year, 182 days | Army | Lee Myung-bak |
| 35 | Lee Sang-eui | General; Lee Sang-eui (born 1951) | 30 September 2009 | 30 June 2010 | 273 days | Army | Lee Myung-bak |
| 36 | Han Min-goo | General; Han Min-goo (born 1951) | 30 June 2010 | 26 October 2011 | 1 year, 118 days | Army | Lee Myung-bak |
| 37 | Jeong Seung-jo | General; Jeong Seung-jo (born 1953) | 26 October 2011 | 16 October 2013 | 1 year, 355 days | Army | Lee Myung-bak; Park Geun-hye |
| 38 | Choi Yoon-hee | Admiral; Choi Yoon-hee (born 1953) | 16 October 2013 | 7 October 2015 | 1 year, 356 days | Navy | Park Geun-hye |
| 39 | Lee Sun-jin | General; Lee Sun-jin (born 1954) | 7 October 2015 | 20 August 2017 | 1 year, 317 days | Army | Park Geun-hye; Moon Jae-in |
| 40 | Jeong Kyeong-doo | General; Jeong Kyeong-doo (born 1960) | 20 August 2017 | 21 September 2018 | 1 year, 32 days | Air Force | Moon Jae-in |
| 41 | Park Han-ki | General; Park Han-ki (born 1960) | 11 October 2018 | 23 September 2020 | 1 year, 348 days | Army | Moon Jae-in |
| 42 | Won In-choul | General; Won In-choul (born 1961) | 23 September 2020 | 5 July 2022 | 1 year, 285 days | Air Force | Moon Jae-in |
| 43 | Kim Seung-kyum | General; Kim Seung-kyum (born 1963) | 5 July 2022 | 25 November 2023 | 1 year, 143 days | Army | Yoon Suk-yeol |
| 44 | Kim Myung-soo | Admiral; Kim Myung-soo (born 1967) | 25 November 2023 | 30 September 2025 | 1 year, 309 days | Navy | Yoon Suk-yeol |
| 45 | Jin Young Seung | General; Jin Young Seung (born 1969) | 30 September 2025 | Incumbent | 1 year, 44 days | Air Force | Lee Jae-myung |
