= Kwon Young-hae =

South Korean military officer and politician

- 권영해
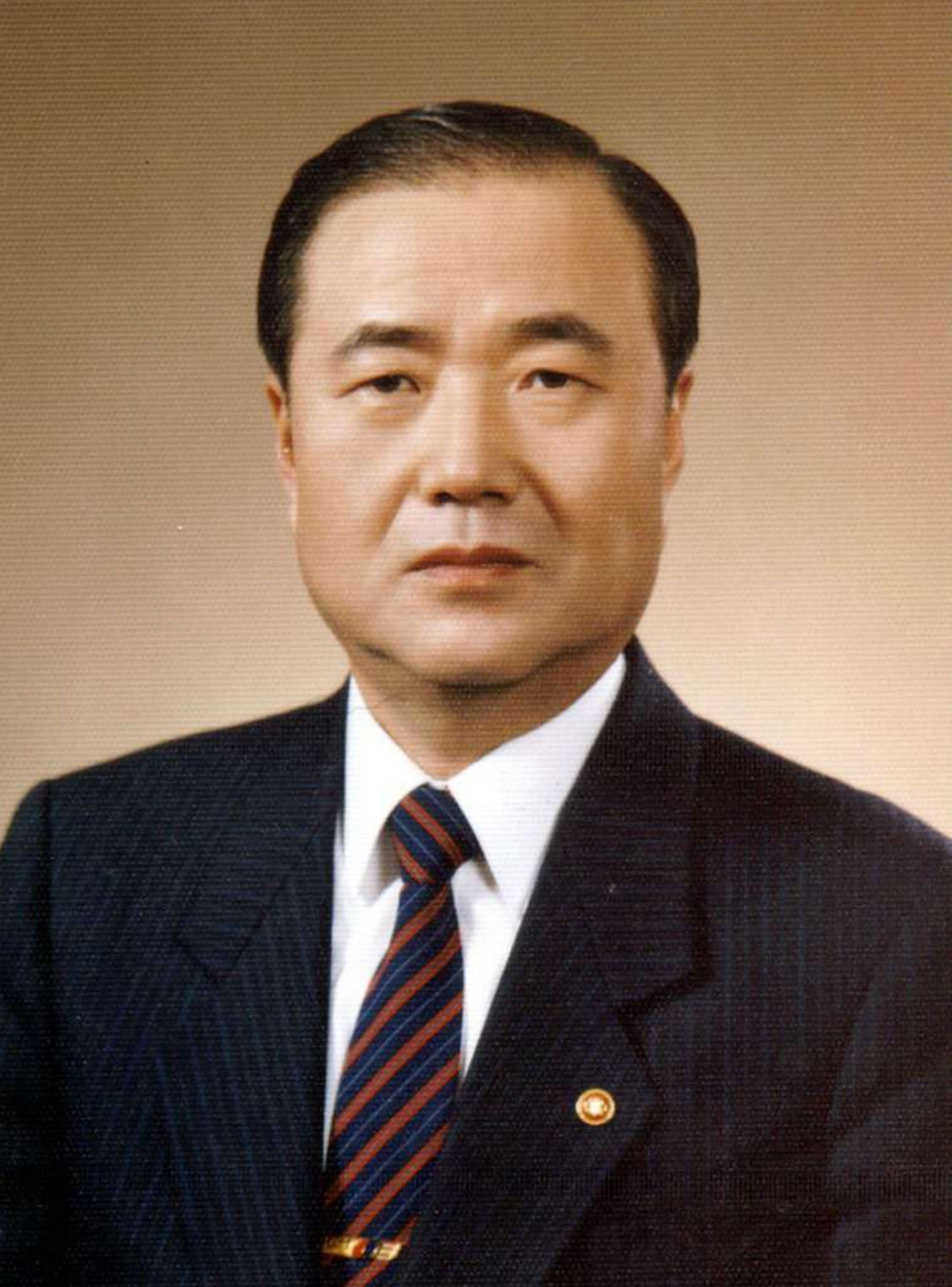

Minister of National Defense
- In office 26 February 1993 – 22 December 1993
- President: Kim Young-sam
- Preceded by: Choi Se-chang
- Succeeded by: Lee Byung-tae

Personal details
- Born: 9 September 1937 (age 89) Korea, Empire of Japan
- Citizenship: South Korean
- Party: New Korea Party; Liberty Korea Party; Saenuri Party
- Education: Korea Military Academy; ROK Army Infantry School; Korea National Defense University
- Occupation: Military officer, politician

Military service
- Allegiance: South Korea
- Branch/service: Republic of Korea Army
- Rank: Major general

Kwon Young-hae (Korean: 권영해; born 9 September 1937) is a South Korean former military officer and government official who served as the 30th minister of national defense from February to December 1993. He subsequently became director of the Agency for National Security Planning, South Korea's principal intelligence organization at the time, serving from December 1994 until February 1998.

== Biography ==
Kwon Young-hae was born on 9 September 1937 in Gyeongju, in what was then North Gyeongsang Province, during the Japanese colonial period in Korea.

He attended Gyeongju High School before entering the Korea Military Academy, from which he graduated as a member of its 15th graduating class in 1959. He also studied at the Korea National Defense University. His military education prepared him for a professional career in the Republic of Korea Army, where he subsequently served in operational, command and staff positions including commander of the 6th Infantry Division, chief of staff of the Third Army Command and commander of the Seoul Olympic Support Command. In December 1990, Kwon was promoted to Vice Minister of National Defense under President Roh Tae-woo. On 26 February 1993, Kwon became Minister of National Defense in the administration of President Kim Young-sam, who had assumed office three days earlier. Kwon, who was not a member of Hanahoe, became one of the principal military figures involved in the government's campaign to dismantle its influence. He was part of the Sangdo-dong faction
