= Roh Jae-hyun =

South Korean general (1927–2019)

Roh Jae-hyun 노재현 盧載鉉
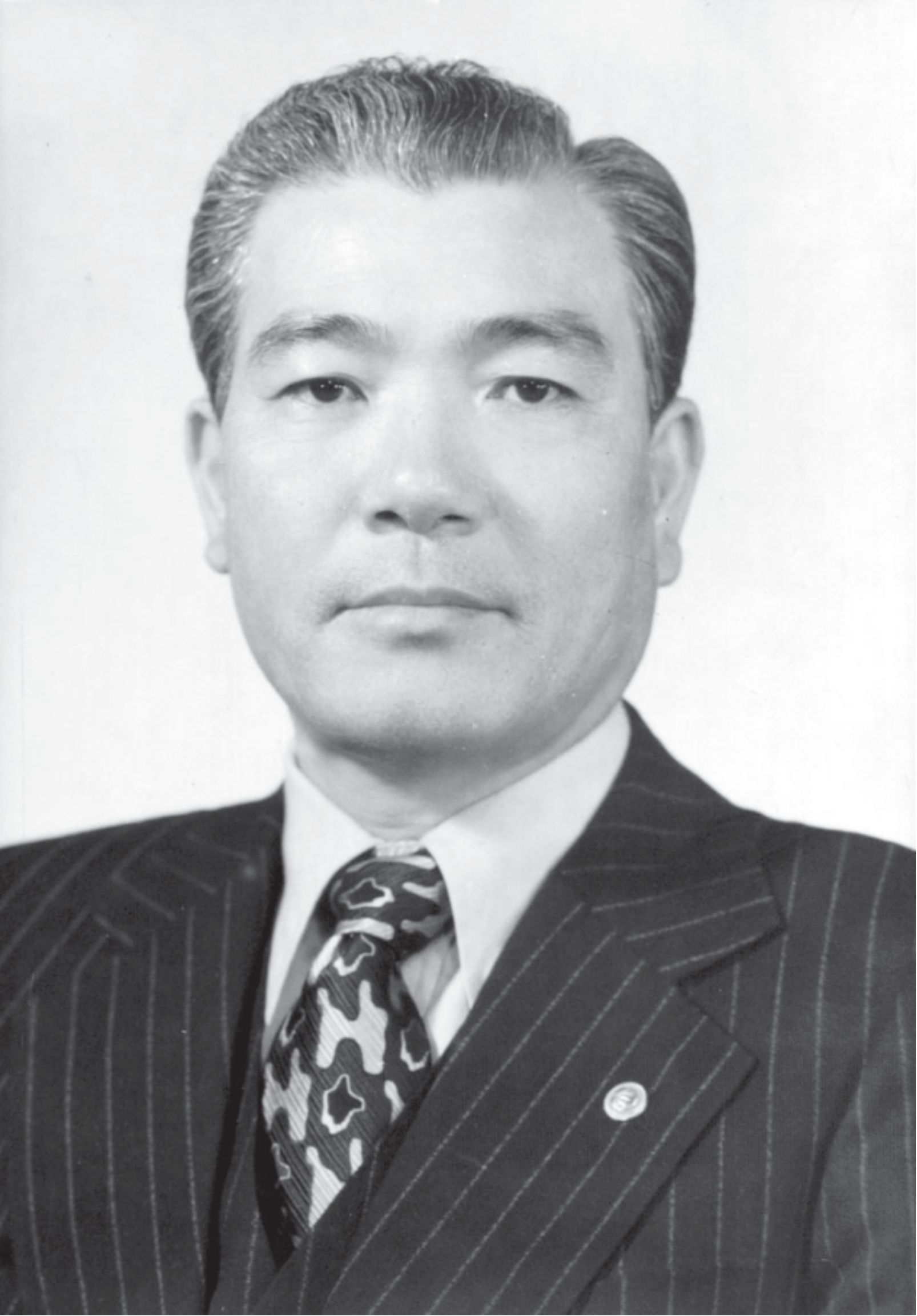

Minister of National Defense
- In office 20 December 1977 – 14 December 1979
- President: Park Chung Hee; Choi Kyu-hah
- Preceded by: Seo Jong-chul
- Succeeded by: Joo Young-bok

Personal details
- Born: 8 August 1926 Masan, Korea, Empire of Japan
- Died: 25 September 2019 (aged 93) Seoul, South Korea
- Military career
- Allegiance: Empire of Japan; South Korea
- Branch: Republic of Korea Army
- Service years: 1947–1975
- Rank: General
- Commands: 30th Infantry Division; 7th Infantry Division; II Corps; Republic of Korea Army Deputy Chief of Staff; Republic of Korea Army Chief of Staff; Chairman of the Joint Chiefs of Staff
- Conflicts: Korean War; Vietnam War; December 12th Coup
- Other work: Minister of National Defense (1977–1979)

Korean name
- Hangul: 노재현
- Hanja: 盧載鉉
- RR: No Jaehyeon
- MR: No Chaehyŏn

Roh Jae-hyun (Korean: 노재현; Hanja: 盧載鉉; 8 August 1926 – 25 September 2019) was a retired general of the Republic of Korea Army and politician who served as the 21st Minister of National Defense. He resigned ungracefully after the Coup d'état of December Twelfth.

== Education ==
- 1945 Graduated from Changshin High School in Masan, Gyeongsangnam-do
- 1947 Graduated from Korea Military Academy, 3rd Graduating Class
- 1949 Graduated from Republic of Korea Army Infantry School
- 1950 Graduated from U.S. Army Artillery School
- 1951 Graduated from Republic of Korea Army Armor School
- 1957 Graduated from Republic of Korea Army College
- 1960 6th Bachelor of Public Administration, Korea National Defense University
- 1965 Master of Public Administration, Korea National Defense University

== Military career ==
He served as the commander of the artillery division of the 25th Division and the commander of the artillery division of the I Corps in 1954, Principal of the Army Artillery School in 1956, Commander of the 30th Division in 1957, Commander of the 7th Division in 1960, Inspector General of the Army Headquarters in 1962, Commander of the Army Logistics Base in 1964, Commander of the II Corps in 1966, Deputy Chief of Staff of the Army in 1969, and then the 20th Chief of Staff of the Army and Chairman of the Joint Chiefs of Staff before retiring as a General of the Army.

== Role in the December 12th Coup ==
He became the 21st Minister of National Defense in 1977. During the December 12th Coup d'état, he fled from his position and brought his entire family to the Yongsan Garrison to seek protection from the Americans before being advised to go back to duty. After reluctantly returning to the army command, he refused to give order of arresting Chun Doo-Hwan or other rebel leaders due to previously receiving their bribe. Instead, he ordered the arrest of Army Chief of Staff Jeong Seung-hwa to appease the rebels. Shortly thereafter, he resigned from politics.

== Later life ==
From 1981, he served as the president of Korea Chemical Industries, and after retiring from politics, he was elected chairman of the board of directors of the Korea Research Institute of Chemical Technology in 1981 and president of the Korea Fertilizer Industry Association in 1982. In 1988, he resigned as chairman of the Chemical Research Institute and of the Fertilizer Industry Association. In 1991, he was elected as the second president of the Korea Freedom Federation, and in 1995, he briefly served as a special member of the Alliance for Freedom and Democracy.
