= Lee Sang-hoon (politician) =

South Korean military officer and politician (1933–2023)

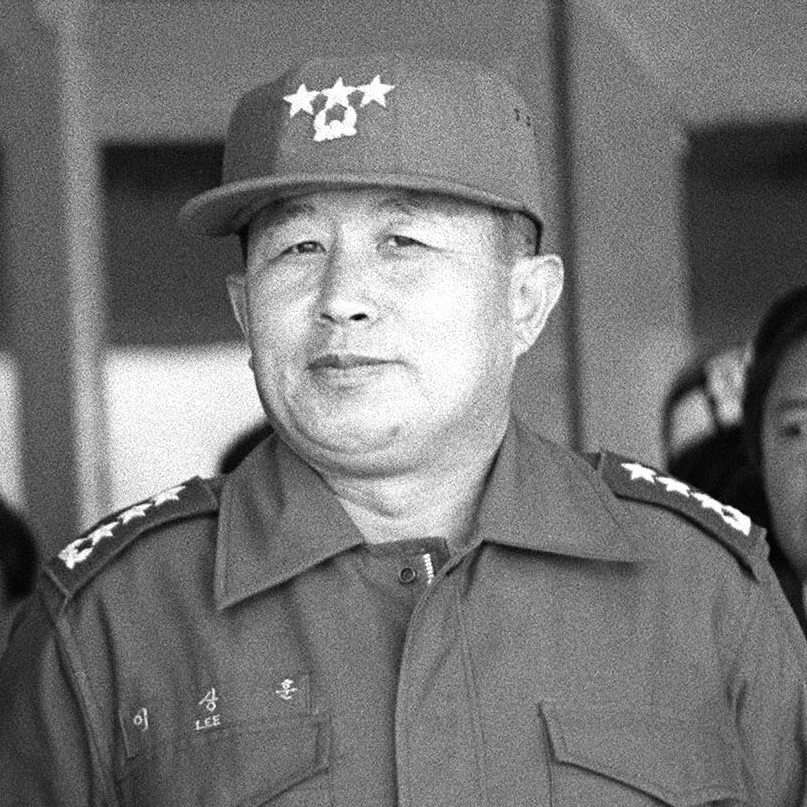
- Lee in 1982

Minister of National Defense
- In office 4 December 1988 – 8 October 1990
- President: Roh Tae-woo
- Preceded by: Oh Ja-bok
- Succeeded by: Lee Jong-gu

Personal details
- Born: 26 June 1933 Cheongwon County, Chūseihoku Province, Korea, Empire of Japan
- Died: 11 September 2023 (aged 90)
- Party: ULD
- Education: Korea Military Academy; Republic of Korea Army Infantry School; Republic of Korea Army College; Seoul National University
- Occupation: Military officer

Lee Sang-hoon (Korean: 이상훈; 26 June 1933 – 11 September 2023) was a South Korean military officer and politician. A member of the ULD, he served as Minister of National Defense from 1988 to 1990.

Lee died on 11 September 2023, at the age of 90.
