= Lee Jong-gu =

South Korean military officer and politician

- 이종구
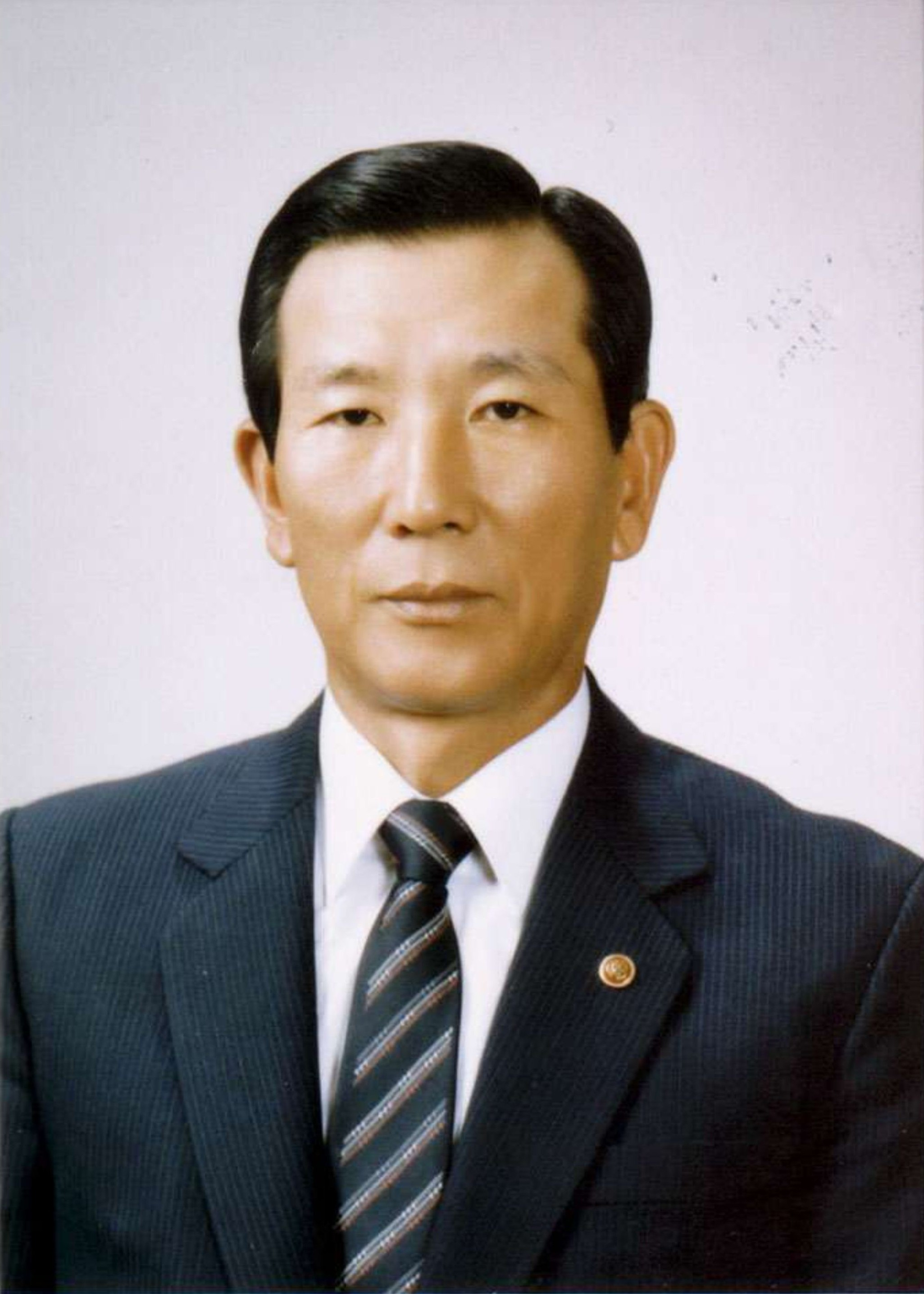

Minister of National Defense
- In office 8 October 1990 – 20 December 1991
- President: Roh Tae-woo
- Preceded by: Lee Sang-hoon
- Succeeded by: Choi Se-chang

Chief of Staff of the ROK Army
- In office 12 June 1988 – 10 June 1990
- Preceded by: Park Hee-do
- Succeeded by: Lee Jin-sam

Personal details
- Born: 26 June 1933 (age 93) Korea, Empire of Japan
- Citizenship: South Korean
- Party: United Liberal Democrats
- Education: Korea Military Academy; Republic of Korea Army Infantry School; Korea National Defense University; Hanyang University
- Occupation: Military officer, politician

Military service
- Allegiance: South Korea
- Branch/service: Republic of Korea Army
- Rank: Jiang (General)

Lee Jong-gu (Korean: 이종구; born November 21, 1935) is a South Korean military officer and a politician who served as minister of defense. His ancestral clan is the Jeonui Lee clan, and his pen name is Hodang.

== Biography ==
He graduated from Gyeongbuk High School. He received a military higher education at the Korea Military Academy (14th class) and the Republic of Korea Army Infantry School. He completed a bachelor's degree in public administration from the Korea National Defense University, master's degree in public administration from the Korea National Defense University and another master's degree in public administration from the Hanyang University Graduate School of Public Administration

From January 1980 to July 1981 he served as director of operations, ROK Army Headquarters (brigadier general). From July 1981 to May 1983 he served as commanding general, 20th Mechanized Infantry Division, ROK Army (Major general). From May 1983 to May 1985 he served as commander, Capital Defense Command (Lieutenant general). From June 1985 to July 1986 he served as commander, Defense Security Command (lieutenant general). From July 1986 to June 1988 he served as commander, Second ROK Army (general). From June 12, 1988, to Jun 10, 1990 he served as 27th chief of staff of the ROK Army (General). From October 8, 1990, to December 19, 1991, he served as the 28th minister of national defense. From July to Octobber 1995 he served as special administrative committee member, United Liberal Democrats. He is an advisor to the Korea Retired Generals and Admirals Association (Seongwoohoe).
