= Kim Dong-jin (disambiguation) =

Kim Dong-jin (born 1982) is a South Korean footballer.

Kim Dong-jin may also refer to:

- Kim Dong-jin (referee) (born 1973)
- Kim Dong-jin (footballer, born 1992), South Korean footballer
- Kim Dong-jin (composer) (1913–2009)
- Kim Dong-jin (politician) (born 1937)
