= Kim Dong-shin =

South Korean defense minister, army general officer

- 김동신
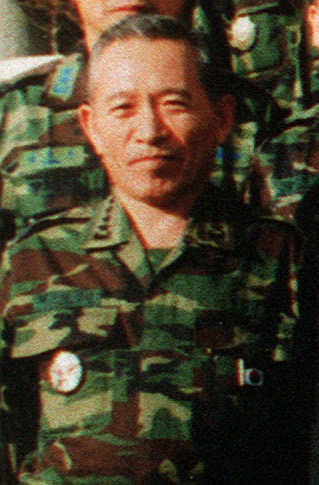

Minister of National Defense
- In office 26 March 2001 – 12 July 2002
- Preceded by: Cho Seong-tae
- Succeeded by: Lee Jun

Chief of Staff of the ROK Army
- In office 28 March 1998 – 2 October 1999
- Preceded by: Do Il-gyu
- Succeeded by: Gil Hyeong-bo

Personal details
- Born: 14 July 1941 (age 85) Gwangju, Japanese-controlled Korea
- Citizenship: South Korean
- Party: Democratic Party; United Liberal Democrats
- Education: Korea Military Academy; Seoul National University; Hannam University; Sun Moon University

Military service
- Allegiance: South Korea
- Branch/service: Republic of Korea Army
- Rank: Jiang (General)

Kim Dong-shin (Korean: 김동신; born 14 July 1941) is a retired South Korean Army general and politician who served as the minister of national defense from 26 March 2001 to 12 July 2002, during the presidency of Kim Dae-jung. Before becoming defense minister, he held several senior military commands, including chief of staff of the Republic of Korea Army. and deputy commander of the ROK/US Combined Forces Command.

== Biography ==
Kim Dong-shin was born in 1941 in Gwangju, Japanese-controlled Korea. He attended Gwangju Jeil High School before entering the Korea Military Academy, where he graduated as a member of the 21st graduating class. In addition to his military education, Kim studied English language and literature at Seoul National University. He also earned a Master of Business Administration degree from Hannam University.

He served in various positions in the army, including director of the Force Planning Division of the Joint Chiefs of Staff, deputy director of the Policy Planning Office at the Ministry of National Defense, commander of the 51st Infantry Division, deputy commander of the ROK/US Combined Forces Command and chief of staff of the Republic of Korea Army. His appointment as chief of staff of the ROK Army in 1998 attracted considerable attention because he became the first individual from the Honam region (southwestern South Korea) to hold the position.

Following his retirement from the army, he became a member of the Millennium Democratic Party. On 26 March 2001, Kim Dong-shin was appointed minister of national defense under President Kim Dae-jung, succeeding Cho Sung-tae. On 21 June 2001, Kim visited The Pentagon, where he met with US secretary of defense Donald Rumsfeld and deputy secretary of defense Paul Wolfowitz. The discussions addressed regional security issues and matters of mutual interest to the two countries.
