= Minister of National Defense (South Korea) =

South Korean government position

- Flag of the Minister of National Defense

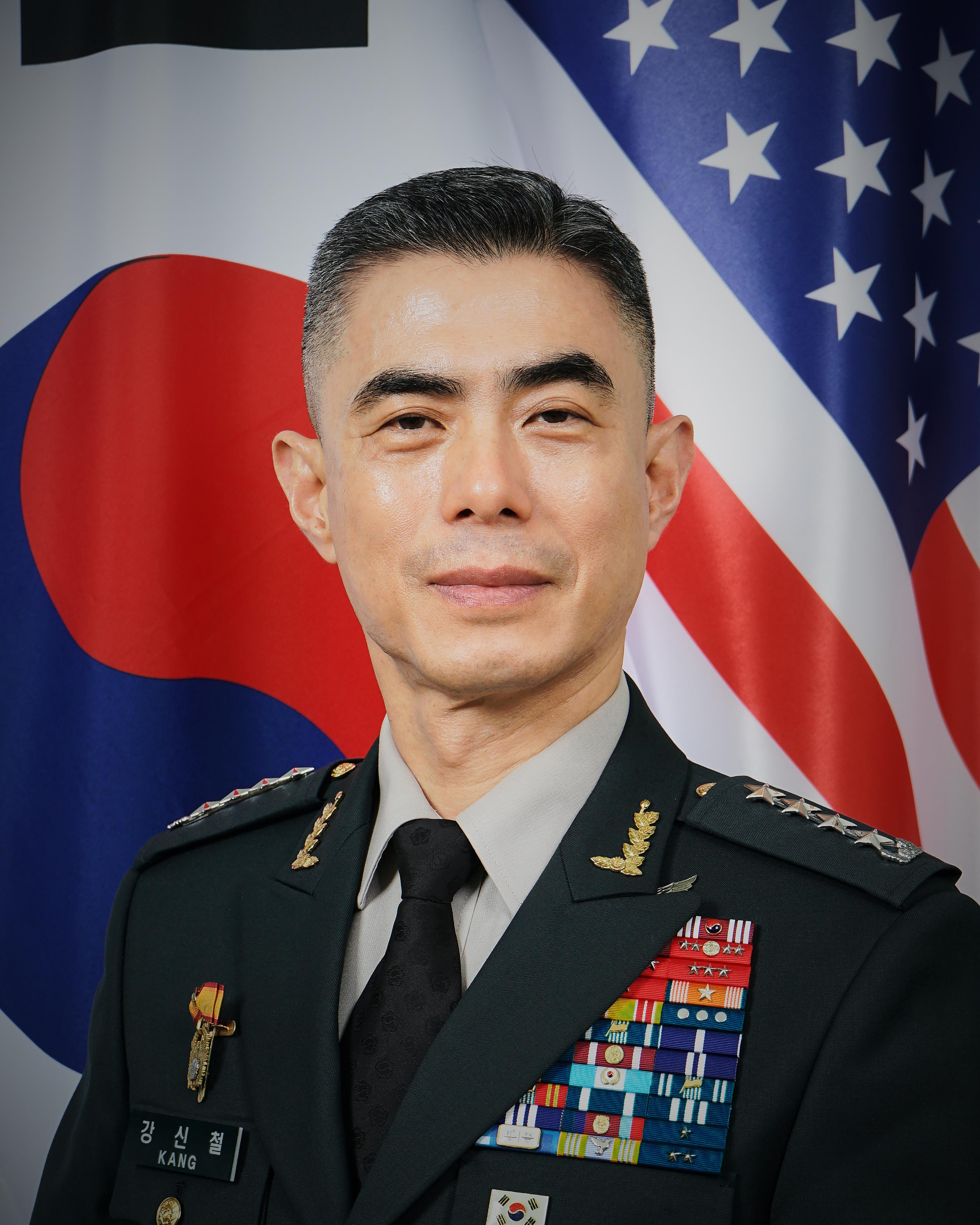
- Incumbent; Kang Shin-chul since 22 September 2026
- Ministry of National Defense
- Member of: State Council of South Korea
- Reports to: President of South Korea
- Appointer: President
- Formation: August 15, 1948; 78 years ago
- Deputy: Deputy Minister of National Defense

Korean name
- Hangul: 국방부 장관
- Hanja: 國防部長官
- RR: Gukbangbu janggwan
- MR: Kukpangbu changgwan

The Minister of National Defense (Korean: 국방부장관) of South Korea is the leader and chief executive of the Ministry of National Defense. The minister is responsible for implementing South Korea's national defense policy, and is a member of the State Council. The minister of national defense is appointed by the president and is confirmed upon a hearing by the National Assembly.

Under the principle of civil control, Article 87 of the South Korean Constitution mandates that no current member of the armed forces can become a member of the State Council. However, South Korean law does not instate a required period of hiatus between retirement from military service and appointment to the position of defense minister, resulting in a majority of past ministers being 'quasi-civilians' who were appointed after recent relief from active duty. Ahn Gyu-back is considered to have been the first civilian defence minister since the May 16 coup in 1961.

The current minister of national defense is Kang Shin-chul, whose appointment was approved by president Lee Jae Myung on September 22, 2026.

== List of ministers ==
Denotes acting minister

No.	Portrait	Name (Birth–Death)	Term of office			Defence branch	President
No.	Portrait	Name (Birth–Death)	Took office	Left office	Time in office	Defence branch	President
1		Lee Beom-seok 이범석 李範奭 (1900–1972)	15 August 1948	20 March 1949	217 days	Korean Liberation Army	Syngman Rhee
2		Shin Song-mo 신성모 申性模 (1891–1960)	21 March 1949	5 May 1951	2 years, 45 days	Republic of Korea Navy	Syngman Rhee
3		Lee Ki-poong 이기붕 李起鵬 (1896–1960)	7 May 1951	29 March 1952	327 days	Civilian	Syngman Rhee
4		Shin Tae-young 신태영 申泰英 (1891–1959)	29 March 1952	30 June 1953	1 year, 93 days	Republic of Korea Army	Syngman Rhee
5		Sohn Won-yil 손원일 孫元一 (1909–1980)	30 June 1953	26 May 1956	2 years, 331 days	Republic of Korea Navy	Syngman Rhee
6		Kim Yong-woo 김용우 金用雨 (1912–1985)	26 May 1956	6 July 1957	1 year, 41 days	Civilian	Syngman Rhee
7		Kim Chung-yul 김정렬 金貞烈 (1917–1992)	6 July 1957	2 May 1960	2 years, 301 days	Republic of Korea Air Force	Syngman Rhee
8		Lee Jong-chan 이종찬 李鐘贊 (1916–1983)	2 May 1960	23 August 1960	113 days	Republic of Korea Army	Yun Po-sun
9		Hyun Suk-ho 현석호 玄錫虎 (1907–1988)	23 August 1960	12 September 1960	20 days	Civilian	Yun Po-sun
10		Kwon Joong-don 권중돈 權仲敦 (1912–1985)	12 September 1960	30 January 1961	140 days	Civilian	Yun Po-sun
11		Hyun Suk-ho 현석호 玄錫虎 (1907–1988)	30 January 1961	18 May 1961	108 days	Civilian	Yun Po-sun
12		Chang Do-yong 장도영 張都暎 (1923–2012)	20 May 1961 (Note: Appointed by Park Chung Hee through the May 16 coup.)	6 June 1961	17 days	Republic of Korea Army	Yun Po-sun
—		Shin Eung-gyun 신응균 申應均 (1921–1996); Acting	6 June 1961	12 June 1961	6 days	Republic of Korea Army	Yun Po-sun
13		Song Yo-chan 송요찬 宋堯讚 (1918–1980)	12 June 1961	10 July 1961	28 days	Republic of Korea Army	Yun Po-sun
14		Park Byung-kwon 박병권 朴炳權 (1920–2005)	10 July 1961	16 March 1963	1 year, 249 days	Republic of Korea Army	Yun Po-sun
14		Park Byung-kwon 박병권 朴炳權 (1920–2005)	10 July 1961	16 March 1963	1 year, 249 days	Republic of Korea Army	Park Chung-hee (acting)
15		Kim Seong-eun 김성은 金聖恩 (1924–2007)	16 March 1963	27 February 1968	4 years, 348 days	Republic of Korea Marine Corps	Park Chung-hee (acting)
15		Kim Seong-eun 김성은 金聖恩 (1924–2007)	16 March 1963	27 February 1968	4 years, 348 days	Republic of Korea Marine Corps	Park Chung-hee
16		Choi Young-hee 최영희 崔榮喜 (1921–2006)	28 February 1968	5 August 1968	159 days	Republic of Korea Army	Park Chung-hee
17		Im Chung-sik 임충식 任忠植 (1922–1974)	5 August 1968	10 March 1970	1 year, 217 days	Republic of Korea Army	Park Chung-hee
18		Jeong Rae-hyuk 정래혁 丁來赫 (1926–2022)	10 March 1970	25 August 1971	1 year, 168 days	Republic of Korea Army	Park Chung-hee
19		Yu Jae-hung 유재흥 劉載興 (1921–2011)	25 August 1971	3 December 1973	2 years, 100 days	Republic of Korea Army	Park Chung-hee
20		Seo Jong-chul 서종철 徐鐘喆 (1924–2010)	3 December 1973	20 December 1977	4 years, 17 days	Republic of Korea Army	Park Chung-hee
21		Roh Jae-hyun 노재현 盧載鉉 (1926–2019)	20 December 1977	14 December 1979 (Note: Resigned to seek protection from the United States following the 1979 South Korean coup d'état.)	1 year, 359 days	Republic of Korea Army	Park Chung-hee
22		Joo Young-bok 주영복 周永福 (1927–2005)	14 December 1979	21 May 1982	2 years, 158 days	Republic of Korea Air Force	Choi Kyu-hah
22		Joo Young-bok 주영복 周永福 (1927–2005)	14 December 1979	21 May 1982	2 years, 158 days	Republic of Korea Air Force	Chun Doo-hwan
23		Yoon Sung-min 윤성민 尹誠敏 (1926–2017)	21 May 1982	8 January 1986	3 years, 232 days	Republic of Korea Army	Chun Doo-hwan
24		Lee Ki-paik 이기백 李基百 (1931–2019)	8 January 1986	14 July 1987	1 year, 187 days	Republic of Korea Army	Chun Doo-hwan
25		Chung Ho-yong 정호용 鄭鎬溶 (1932–2026)	14 July 1987	25 February 1988	226 days	Republic of Korea Army	Chun Doo-hwan
26		Oh Ja-bok 오자복 吳滋福 (1930–2017)	25 February 1988	4 December 1988	283 days	Republic of Korea Army	Roh Tae-woo
27		Lee Sang-hoon 이상훈 李相薰 (1933–2023)	4 December 1988	8 October 1990	1 year, 308 days	Republic of Korea Army	Roh Tae-woo
28		Lee Jong-gu 이종구 李鐘九 (born 1935)	8 October 1990	20 December 1991	1 year, 73 days	Republic of Korea Army	Roh Tae-woo
29		Choi Se-chang 최세창 崔世昌 (born 1934)	20 December 1991	26 February 1993	1 year, 68 days	Republic of Korea Army	Roh Tae-woo
30		Kwon Young-hae 권영해 權寧海 (born 1937)	26 February 1993	22 December 1993	299 days	Republic of Korea Army	Kim Young-sam
31		Lee Byung-tae 이병태 李炳台 (born 1937)	22 December 1993	24 December 1994	1 year, 2 days	Republic of Korea Army	Kim Young-sam
32		Lee Yang-ho 이양호 李養鎬 (1937–2020)	24 December 1994	18 October 1996	1 year, 299 days	Republic of Korea Air Force	Kim Young-sam
33		Kim Dong-jin 김동진 金東鎭 (born 1938)	18 October 1996	3 March 1998	1 year, 136 days	Republic of Korea Army	Kim Young-sam
34		Chun Yong-taek 천용택 千容宅 (1937–2026)	3 March 1998	24 May 1999	1 year, 82 days	Republic of Korea Army	Kim Dae-jung
35		Cho Seong-tae 조성태 趙成台 (1942–2021)	24 May 1999	26 March 2001	1 year, 306 days	Republic of Korea Army	Kim Dae-jung
36		Kim Dong-shin 김동신 金東信 (born 1941)	26 March 2001	12 July 2002	1 year, 108 days	Republic of Korea Army	Kim Dae-jung
37		Lee Jun 이준 李俊 (born 1940)	12 July 2002	27 February 2003	230 days	Republic of Korea Army	Kim Dae-jung
38		Cho Yung-kil 조영길 曺永吉 (born 1940)	27 February 2003	29 July 2004	1 year, 153 days	Republic of Korea Army	Roh Moo-hyun
39		Yoon Kwang-ung 윤광웅 尹光雄 (born 1942)	29 July 2004	24 November 2006	2 years, 118 days	Republic of Korea Navy	Roh Moo-hyun
40		Kim Jang-soo 김장수 金章洙 (born 1948)	24 November 2006	29 February 2008	1 year, 97 days	Republic of Korea Army	Roh Moo-hyun
41		Lee Sang-hee 이상희 李相憙 (1945–2026)	29 February 2008	22 September 2009	1 year, 206 days	Republic of Korea Army	Lee Myung-bak
42		Kim Tae-young 김태영 金泰榮 (1949–2025)	23 September 2009	4 December 2010	1 year, 72 days	Republic of Korea Army	Lee Myung-bak
43		Kim Kwan-jin 김관진 金寬鎭 (born 1949)	4 December 2010	30 June 2014	3 years, 208 days	Republic of Korea Army	Lee Myung-bak
43		Kim Kwan-jin 김관진 金寬鎭 (born 1949)	4 December 2010	30 June 2014	3 years, 208 days	Republic of Korea Army	Park Geun-hye
44		Han Min-goo 한민구 韓民求 (born 1951)	30 June 2014	13 July 2017	3 years, 13 days	Republic of Korea Army	Park Geun-hye
45		Song Young-moo 송영무 宋永武 (born 1949)	13 July 2017	21 September 2018	1 year, 70 days	Republic of Korea Navy	Moon Jae-in
46		Jeong Kyeong-doo 정경두 鄭景斗 (born 1960)	21 September 2018	18 September 2020	1 year, 363 days	Republic of Korea Air Force	Moon Jae-in
47		Suh Wook 서욱 徐旭 (born 1963)	18 September 2020	10 May 2022	1 year, 234 days	Republic of Korea Army	Moon Jae-in
48		Lee Jong-sup 이종섭 李鐘燮 (born 1960)	10 May 2022	6 October 2023	1 year, 149 days	Republic of Korea Army	Yoon Suk Yeol
49		Shin Won-sik 신원식 申源湜 (born 1958)	7 October 2023	5 September 2024	334 days	Republic of Korea Army	Yoon Suk Yeol
50		Kim Yong-hyun 김용현 金龍顯 (born 1959)	6 September 2024	5 December 2024 (Note: Resigned due to his involvement in the 2024 South Korean martial law crisis.)	90 days	Republic of Korea Army	Yoon Suk Yeol
—		Kim Seon-ho 김선호 金善鎬 (born 1964)	5 December 2024	27 June 2025	204 days	Republic of Korea Army	Yoon Suk Yeol
—		Lee Doo-hee 이두희 李斗熙 (born 1967)	27 June 2025	25 July 2025	28 days	Republic of Korea Army	Lee Jae Myung
51		Ahn Gyu-back 안규백 安圭伯 (born 1961)	25 July 2025	22 September 2026	1 year, 36 days	civilian	Lee Jae Myung
52		Kang Shin-chul 강신철 姜信哲 (born 1968)	22 September 2026	Incumbent	84 days	Republic of Korea Army	Lee Jae Myung
