= Lee Jun (politician) =

South Korean businessman

- 이준
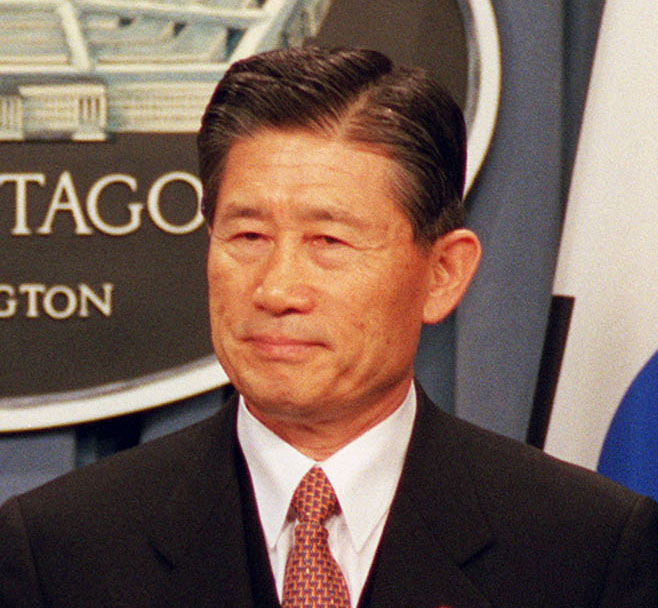

Minister of National Defense
- In office 12 July 2002 – 27 February 2003
- Preceded by: Kim Dong-shin
- Succeeded by: Cho Yung-kil

Personal details
- Born: 30 June 1940 (age 86) Korea, Empire of Japan
- Citizenship: South Korean
- Party: Millennium Democratic Party; New Korea Party; United Liberal Democrats
- Education: Korea Military Academy

Military service
- Allegiance: South Korea
- Branch/service: Republic of Korea Army
- Rank: Jiang (General)

Lee Jun (Korean: 이준; born 30 June 1940) is a retired South Korean military officer and politician who served as the 37th Minister of National Defense from July 2002 until February 2003. Before entering government, he pursued a career in the Republic of Korea Army, eventually attaining the rank of general and serving as commander of the First Republic of Korea Army.

== Biography ==
Born on 30 June 1940, in Japanese-controlled Korea, he was part of Pyeongchang-yi Clan. He attended the Korea Military Academy.

Lee Jun was appointed Minister of National Defense on 12 July 2002, succeeding General Kim Dong-shin. During his tenure he travelled to the United States where he met Secretary of Defense Donald Rumsfeld. Lee Jun's tenure as Minister of National Defense ended on 27 February 2003 in connection with the transition from the presidency of Kim Dae-jung to that of Roh Moo-hyun. He was succeeded by Cho Yung-kil.
