= Chun Yong-taek =

South Korean politician (1937–2026)

- 천용택
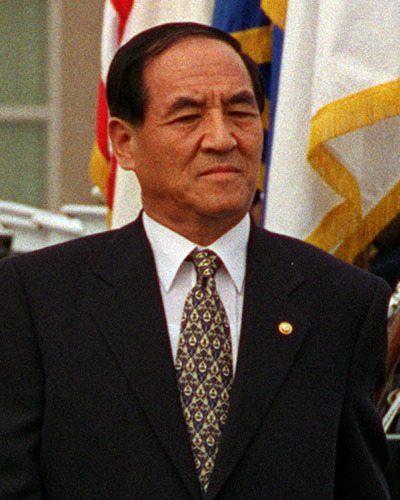
- Chun in 1998

Member of the National Assembly of South Korea
- In office 30 May 1996 – 29 May 2004

Minister of National Defense
- In office 3 March 1998 – 24 May 1999
- President: Kim Dae-jung
- Preceded by: Kim Dong-jin
- Succeeded by: Cho Seong-tae

Personal details
- Born: 28 August 1937 Wando County, Korea, Empire of Japan
- Died: 24 July 2026 (aged 88)
- Party: NCNP; MDP
- Education: Korea Military Academy; Republic of Korea Army Infantry School
- Occupation: Military officer

Chun Yong-taek (Korean: 천용택; 28 August 1937 – 24 July 2026) was a South Korean politician. A member of the National Congress for New Politics and the Millennium Democratic Party, he served in the National Assembly from 1996 to 2004 and was Minister of National Defense from 1998 to 1999.

Chun died on 24 July 2026, at the age of 88.
