= Lee Byung-tae =

South Korean military officer and politician

- 이병태
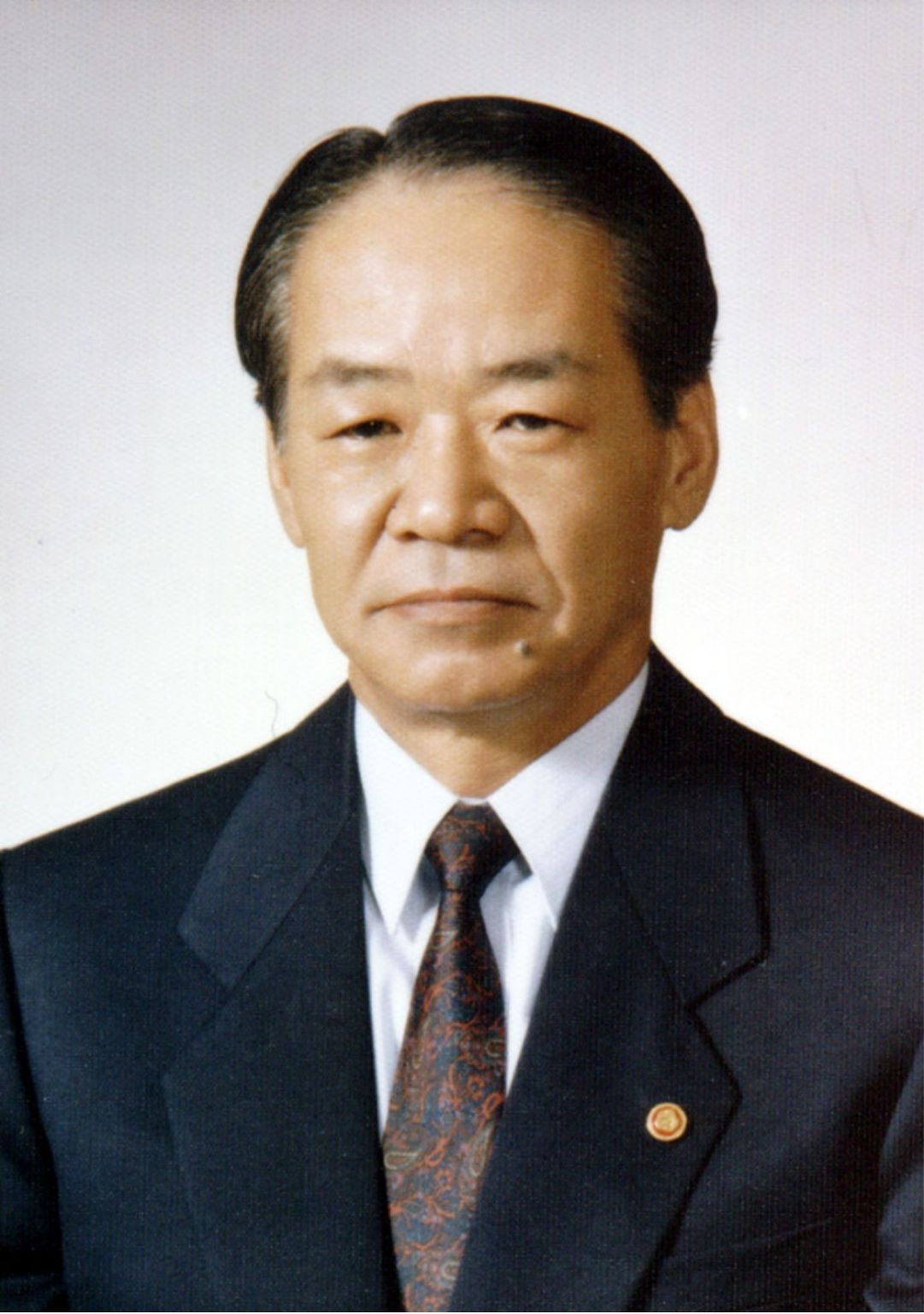

Minister of National Defense
- In office 22 December 1993 – 24 December 1994
- President: Kim Young-sam
- Preceded by: Kwon Young-hae
- Succeeded by: Lee Yang-ho

Personal details
- Born: 9 September 1937 Daegu, Japanese-controlled Korea
- Died: 22 July 2021 (aged 84)
- Resting place: Seoul National Cemetery
- Citizenship: South Korean
- Party: New Korea Party
- Education: Seoul High School; Korea Military Academy; Korea National Defense University
- Occupation: Military officer, politician

Military service
- Allegiance: South Korea
- Branch/service: Republic of Korea Army
- Rank: Lieutenant general

Lee Byung-tae (Korean: 이병태; 1 February 1937 – 22 July 2021) was a South Korean military officer, diplomat and government official who served as the 31st Minister of National Defense of the South Korea from December 1993 to December 1994, during the presidency of Kim Young-sam.

== Biography ==
Lee Byung-tae was born on 1 February 1937 in Uiseong County, North Gyeongsang Province, during the Japanese colonial period in Korea. He attended Gyeongnam High School in Busan, one of South Korea's established secondary schools. In 1957, he entered the Korea Military Academy as a member of its 17th graduating class. He graduated in 1961 and was commissioned as an officer in the Republic of Korea Army. In August 1992, Lee retired from the Republic of Korea Army with the rank of lieutenant general.

In February 1993, following Kim Young-sam's inauguration as president, Lee was appointed Minister of Patriots and Veterans Affairs. One of the notable initiatives of the cabinet he was member of was the repatriation of the remains of prominent Korean independence activists. In August 1993, the remains of several independence figures, including historian and independence activist Park Eun-sik, were brought back to South Korea.

On 22 December 1993, Lee was appointed the 31st Minister of National Defense, succeeding Kwon Young-hae. His appointment reflected President Kim Young-sam's preference for a defense minister with substantial military planning experience, knowledge of the American alliance and familiarity with the institutional structure of the armed forces. Lee's background was somewhat different from that of a conventional operational commander. His military career had been concentrated in strategic planning, policy development and international military relations.

The most widely remembered controversy of Lee's ministerial career occurred in July 1994, when he made remarks during questioning in the National Assembly concerning the possible use of the newly developed city of Ilsan in wartime military operations. Ilsan was one of the major new residential cities developed northwest of Seoul as part of the government's metropolitan housing and urban-development policy. Its geographical location, relatively close to the Demilitarized Zone, made its potential military significance a sensitive subject. During parliamentary questioning, Lee made remarks to the effect that the Seoul metropolitan new town of Ilsan could be used as an obstacle in the event of war. The comments were interpreted as suggesting that civilian urban development could be incorporated into military defensive planning to impede an advancing North Korean force. The statement generated considerable public criticism. Opposition politicians argued that the minister's remarks suggested an alarming willingness to expose civilian populations and residential areas to the consequences of military operations.

On 24 December 1994, Lee was replaced by General Lee Yang-ho as Minister of National Defense after which he withdrew from public life. His funeral was held at Seoul Asan Medical Center, and he was buried at the National Cemetery in Seoul. He was a member of the Sangdo-dong faction.

He was survived by a son and a daughter.
