= Yu Jae-hung =

South Korean military officer (1921–2011)

Yu Jae Hung 유재흥 劉載興
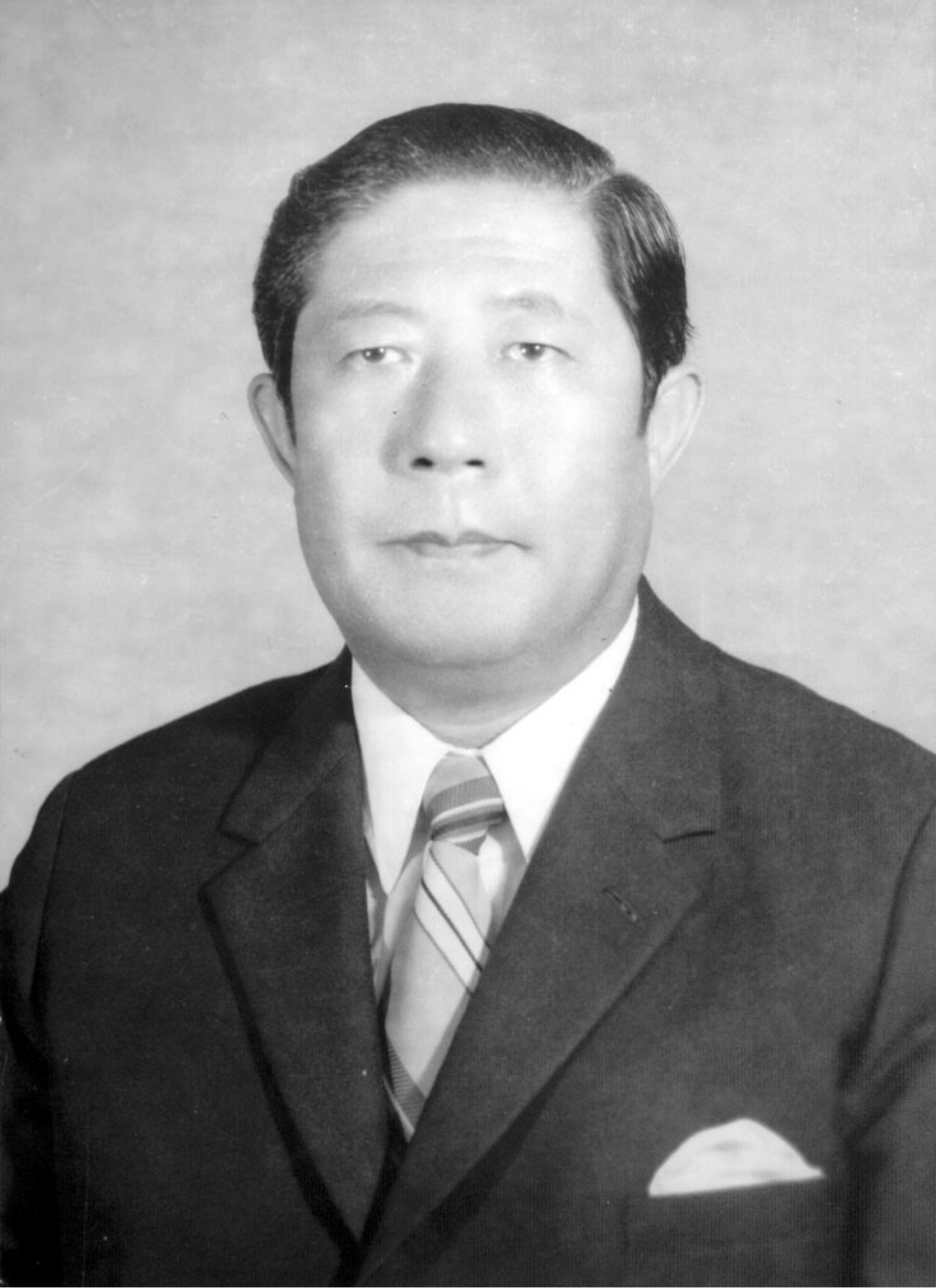
- Yu in 1971

Minister of National Defense
- In office 25 August 1971 – 3 December 1973
- President: Park Chung Hee
- Preceded by: Jeong Rae-hyuk
- Succeeded by: Seo Jong-chul

Personal details
- Born: 3 August 1921 Nagoya, Aichi, Japan
- Died: 26 November 2011 (aged 90) Seoul, South Korea
- Military career
- Allegiance: Empire of Japan; South Korea
- Branch: Imperial Japanese Army; Republic of Korea Army
- Service years: 1942–1945; 1946–1960
- Rank: Captain; Lieutenant General
- Commands: 7th Infantry Division; II Corps; III Corps; Republic of Korea Army Deputy Chief of Staff
- Conflicts: World War II; Jeju uprising; Korean War; Battle of Pusan Perimeter; UN offensive into North Korea; Battle of Pyongyang; Second Phase Campaign; Battle of the Ch'ongch'on River; Chinese Spring Offensive; Battle of the Soyang River
- Awards: Legion of Merit (x2)
- Other work: Ambassador; Minister of National Defense (1971-1973)

Yu Jae Hung (Korean: 유재흥; Hanja: 劉載興; 1921–2011) was a Republic of Korea (ROK) military officer who commanded the ROK II Corps and ROK III Corps in the Korean War.

== Early life ==
Yu Jae Hung was born in Nagoya, Aichi, Japan, on August 3, 1921. He returned to Korea when he was five years old, and spent a short time as an infant in Sinuiju, North Pyongan Province, and then grew up in Gongju, Chūseinan-dō. He went to Sinuiju High School in North Pyongan Province and graduated from the Japanese Military Academy (55th), he was serving as a captain in the Japanese Army at the Pacific War. He was the second child of the Army general, Yu Seung Yeol (1891-1968) and his Japanese wife. He graduated from the Military Academy of Japan.

== Career ==
At the time of Japan's surrender, Yu Jae Hung had been a battalion commander in the Japanese Army. When the ROK Army was first formed, he served as a colonel. When the Jeju uprising occurred, he and his forces were sent to the island to restore order. There was heavy fighting on the island but he finally was able to pacify the situation by promising not to prosecute those who surrendered.

=== Korean War ===
==== Naktong Line ====
At the outset of the Korean War, Brigadier General Yu Jae Hung was commanding the ROK's 7th Division. After the North Korean invasion of South Korea proved to be too much, he was part of the effort to conduct a tactical withdrawal to the Naktong River.

After organizing defenses at the river and receiving US aid, the ROK Army was reorganized and outfitted. By July 1950, Yu Jae Hung was commanding the ROK II Corps. By September 1950, The II Corps was in Hayang defending the Naktong Line.

After the September Offensive by the North Korean Army had strained the defenses of the ROK II Corps. General Yu ordered the ROK 6th and 8th Divisions under his command to send a regiment each to retake Yongchon. The attempt was largely unsuccessful and General Yu's requests for US armor support were not always met but crucial to the retaking of the hill. Yongchon was lost and retaken on two occasions. Captured Inmin-gun documents showed that Kim Il Sung considered the hill to be a crucial strategic point and vital to winning the war but failed repeatedly in his attempts. Gen. Yu's defense of the area was later commemorated by a monument in his honor.

==== Pushing into North Korea, 1950 ====
In October 1950, after a successful landing at Inchon, North Korean troops retreated and UN forces pushed north into North Korea in. During the advance, Maj. Gen. Yu was on the central front. He made it as far as Chorwon before stopping. ROK Army Chief of Staff Chung Il Kwon wanted a Korean Unit to be the first to enter Pyongyang so he had Maj. Gen. Yu sent a regiment to take the city. They encountered pockets of resistance but the unorganized nature of it made the task easy to accomplish.

==== Promotion to the Korean Army Deputy Chief of Staff ====
There were reports of Chinese Army involvement and some Chinese soldiers were captured but US intelligence did not believe that China would be intervening.

In late October 1950, Maj. Gen. Yu was promoted to be Korean Army Deputy Chief of Staff and left for Seoul, leaving ROK II Corps to Brig. Gen. Paik Sun Yup.

Upon realizing the nature of the Chinese attack and vulnerability of his old corps, Yu wanted to return to their aid. The resupply drops that had been promised to him by General Walker were much smaller than expected and the ROK II Corps was decimated. Yu considered this to be the most challenging time for him during the war.

==== The Second Spring Offensive ====
On January 9, 1951, Maj. Gen. Yu Jae Hung was appointed to be the ROK III Corps commander. The Chinese attack, known as the Second Spring Offensive, was handled by US and Korean forces fairly well. The Chinese, though numerous, were poorly supplied and the now battle-hardened and well supplied ROK lines held strong. The fighting ended by May 1951 and the ensuing stalemate lasted until the armistice.

== Later life ==
After his retirement as Lieutenant General in July 1960, Yu was appointed as the Korean Ambassador to Thailand (August 1960-August 1963), Sweden (August 1963-September 1967), Italy (November 1967 – February 1971) and Minister of National Defense between August 1971 and December 1973. He died November 26, 2011, at the age of 91 in Seoul, South Korea.

== Awards ==
=== Legion of Merit, 1st ===
The President of the United States of America, authorized by Act of Congress, 20 July 1942, takes pleasure in presenting the Legion of Merit, in the Degree of Officer to Brigadier General Yu Jae Hung, Korean Army, for exceptionally meritorious conduct in the performance of outstanding services to the Government of the United States from 25 June to 31 August 1950.

=== Legion of Merit, 2nd ===
The President of the United States of America, authorized by Act of Congress, 20 July 1942, takes pleasure in presenting a Bronze Oak Leaf Cluster in lieu of a Second Award of the Legion of Merit, In the Degree of Officer to Lieutenant General Yu Jae Hung, Republic of Korea Army, for exceptionally meritorious conduct in the performance of outstanding services to the Government of the United States from 28 January to 8 May 1952 and from 23 July 1952 to 1 February 1953.
