= Kang Shin-chul =

South Korean general and politician (born 1968)

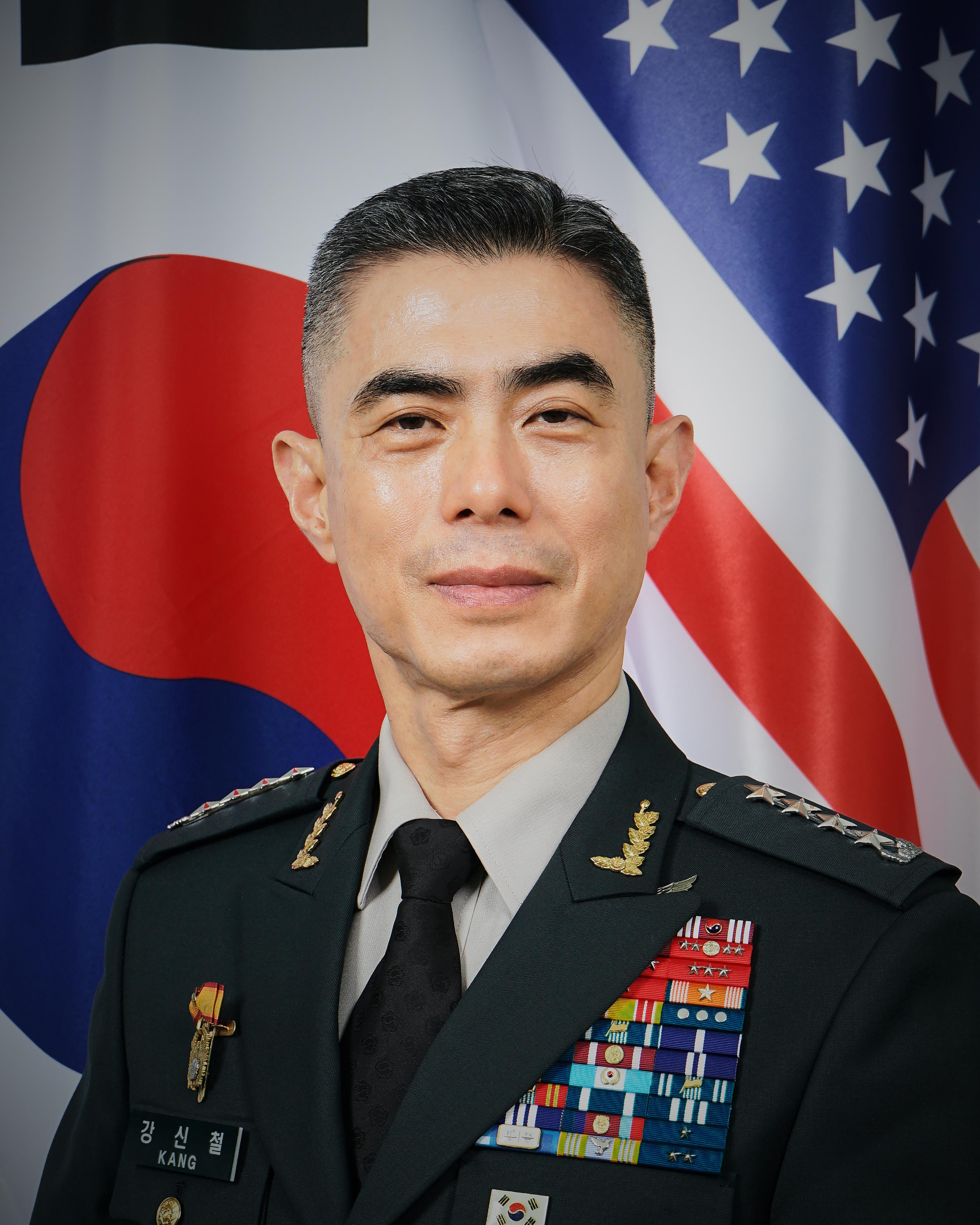
- Kang in 2023

Minister of National Defense
- Incumbent
- Assumed office 22 September 2026
- President: Lee Jae Myung
- Prime Minister: Han Seong-sook
- Preceded by: Ahn Gyu-back

Personal details
- Born: 4 May 1958 (age 68) Seoul, South Korea
- Party: Independent
- Education: Korea Military Academy; Korea National Defense University

Military service
- Allegiance: South Korea
- Branch/service: Republic of Korea Army
- Years of service: 1990–2025
- Rank: General
- Commands: 11th Mechanized Infantry Division; Army War College; Operations Planning Branch, Joint Chiefs of Staff

Kang Shin-chul (Korean: 강신철; born 4 May 1968) is a South Korean politician and retired Republic of Korea Army general. An independent, he has served as minister of national defense of South Korea since September 2026.

== Early life and education ==
Kang Shin-chul was born on 4 May 1968. He received his commission as a second lieutenant of infantry in the Republic of Korea Army on 1 March 1990, upon graduation from the Korea Military Academy as a member of its 46th class. He later received a master's degree in military science from Chungnam National University.

== Army career ==
Kang served as a policy management officer at the Ministry of National Defense from November 2014 to December 2015. He was then the Chief of the Operations Planning Branch on the Joint Chiefs of Staff until November 2016, before becoming an advisor at the defense ministry until July 2017. In October 2017, Kang became the G-33 officer at the First Republic of Korea Army. He served in that role until December 2018. That month, he became the dean of the Army War College at the Joint Forces Military University. From May 2019 to December 2020, Kang was served as commanding general of the 11th Mechanized Infantry Division.

From December 2020 to June 2021, Kang was the Chief of the Strategy Planning Division, Joint Chiefs of Staff. He then served as the secretary of security/national defense strategy on the National Security Council until May 2022. Kang was a deputy commander of the Ground Operations Command until June 2022. From then until October 2023, he was the Chief Director of Operations of the Joint Chiefs of Staff. On 31 October 2023, he became the 31st deputy commander of the ROK/US Combined Forces Command. He was in that post during the 2024 South Korean martial law crisis, before retiring from the Army in September 2025.

== Political career ==
He was the South Korean ambassador to Saudi Arabia from February 2026.

== Personal life ==
Kang is a Christian.
