= Yoon Kwang-ung =

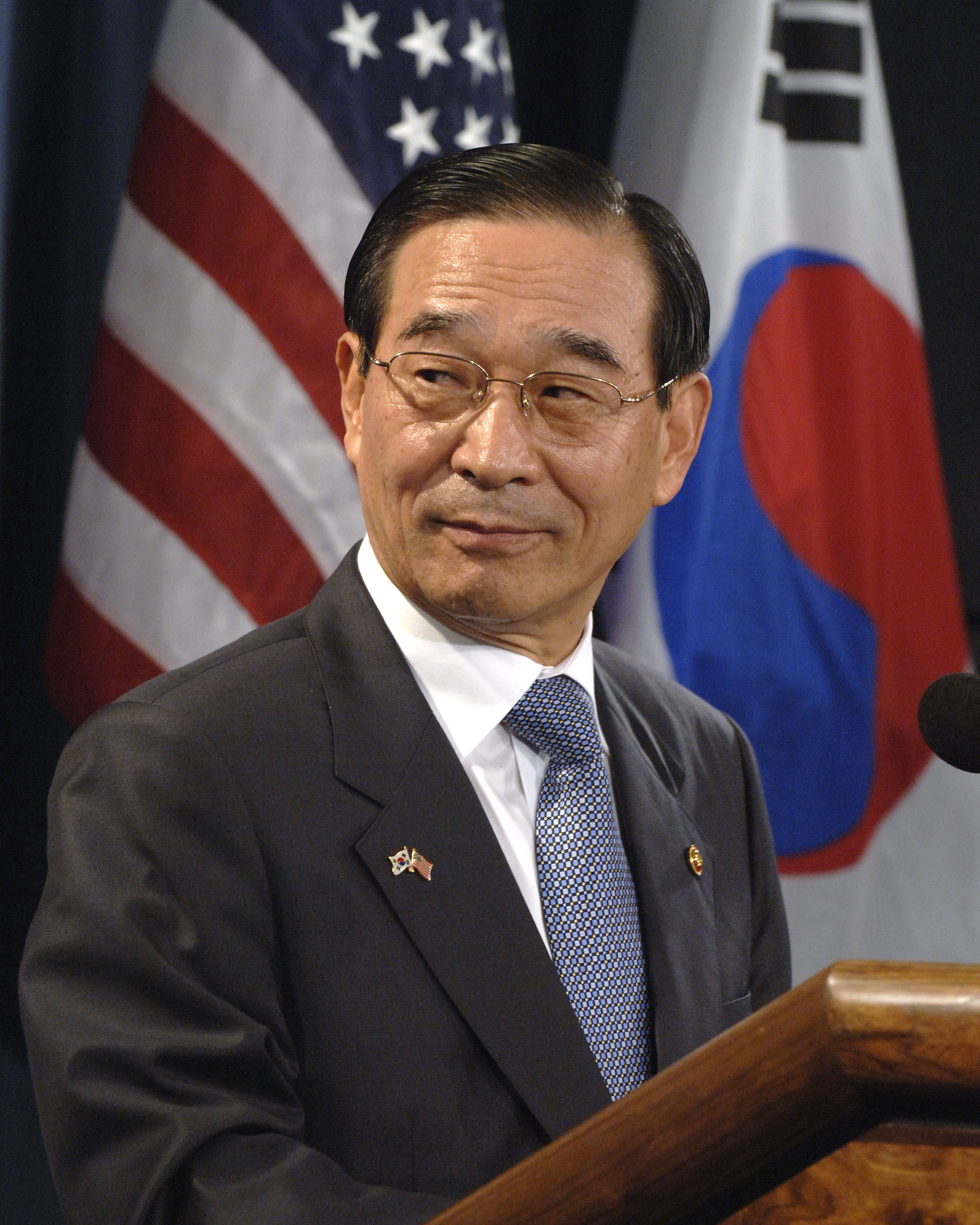

Korean name
- Hangul: 윤광웅
- Hanja: 尹光雄
- RR: Yun Gwangung
- MR: Yun Kwangung

Yoon Kwang-ung (born October 13, 1942, in Busan) is a retired Vice Admiral of the Republic of Korea Navy & former South Korean Minister of National Defense. He held the 39th to hold the post, which he entered in July 2004 after being appointed by president Roh Moo-hyun. He graduated from Busan Commercial High School in 1961 and from the ROK Naval Academy in 1966. He served in various positions in the Navy from 1985 to 2000; thereafter, he worked for three years as an advisor to Hyundai Heavy Industries.

Yoon has been awarded various honors, including the US Legion of Merit and the Korean Order of National Security Merit.

== See also ==
- List of South Korean politicians
- Military of South Korea
- Government of South Korea
