= Seo Jong-chul =

- 서종철
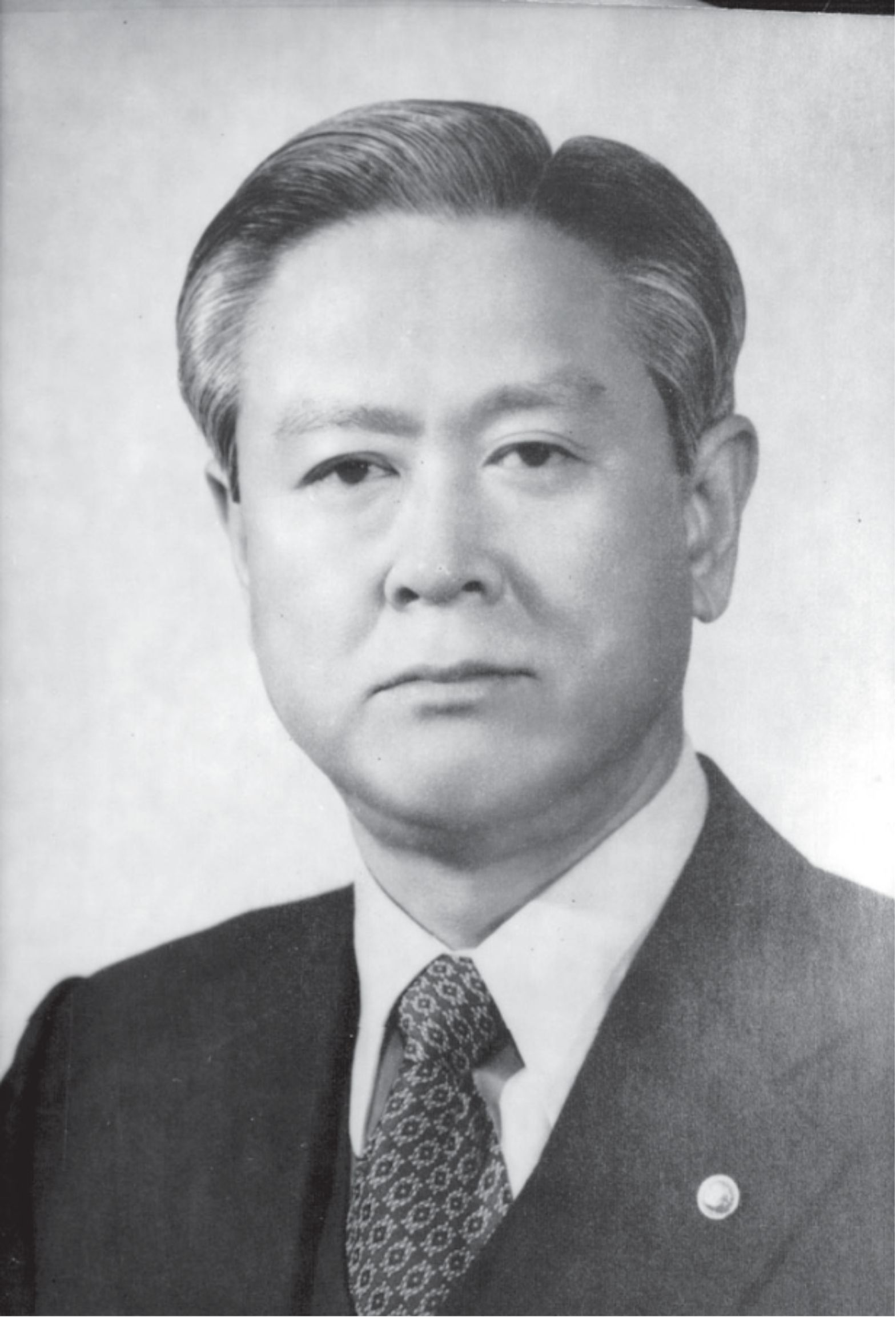

Minister of National Defense
- In office 3 December 1973 – 20 December 1977
- President: Park Chung-hee
- Preceded by: Yu Jae-hung
- Succeeded by: Roh Jae-hyun

Chief of Staff of the Republic of Korea Army
- In office 1 September 1969 – 1 June 1972
- Preceded by: Kim Gye-won
- Succeeded by: Roh Jae-hyun

Personal details
- Born: 26 May 1924 Japanese-controlled Korea
- Died: 20 November 2010 (aged 86) Seoul, South Korea
- Resting place: Daejeon National Cemetery
- Citizenship: South Korean
- Party: Independent
- Education: Korea Military Academy

Military service
- Allegiance: South Korea
- Branch/service: Republic of Korea Army
- Rank: Jiang (General)
- Battles/wars: Korean War

Seo Jong-chul (Korean: 서종철; May 26, 1924 – November 20, 2010) was a South Korean military officer and politician. He served as the 20th Minister of National Defense and as the first and second commissioner of the Korea Baseball Organization.

== Biography ==
Born in Yangsan, South Gyeongsang Province, he was a member of the Dalseong Seo clan.

During the final years of the Japanese colonial period, he was commissioned as a second lieutenant in the Imperial Japanese Army. Following the liberation of Korea on August 15, 1945, he became a member of the first graduating class of the Korea Military Academy in 1946 and was commissioned as a second lieutenant in the Republic of Korea Army. In 1950, at the onset of the Korean War, he served as the commander of the 8th Regiment, which was tasked with the defense of the capital region.

On May 16, 1961, while holding the rank of major general, he participated in the military coup led by Park Chung Hee.

From 1969 to 1972 he served as Chief of Staff of the Republic of Korea Army. During his tenure as the 20th Minister of National Defense, he oversaw the execution of eight individuals who had been sentenced to death by a military tribunal in connection with the "People's Revolutionary Party Reconstruction Committee" case on April 8, 1975, executions that were carried out immediately following the verdict. Later, during his time as a four-star general, he had Chun Doo-hwan and Roh Tae-woo serve as his aides-de-camp, and he acted as a patron of Hanahoe group.

He passed away on November 20, 2010, at the age of 87, and was laid to rest at the Daejeon National Cemetery.

His son, Seo Seung-hwan, is a politician who served as the Minister of Land, Infrastructure and Transport during the Park Geun-hye administration. His granddaughter is the singer and actress Seo Ji-young.
