= Kim Jin-young =

- Hangul: 김진영
- RR: Gim Jinyeong
- MR: Kim Chinyŏng

Kim Jin-young, or Kim Jin-yeong may also refer to:

- Kim Jin-yeong (cyclist) (born 1970), South Korean cyclist
- Kim Jin-young (footballer) (born 1992), South Korean footballer
- Kim Jin-young (Dex) (born 1995), South Korean YouTuber and actor
- Kim Jin-young (actress) (born 2003), South Korean actress
