= Yoon Sung-min =

South Korean general (1927–2019)

Yoon Sung-min 윤성민 尹誠敏
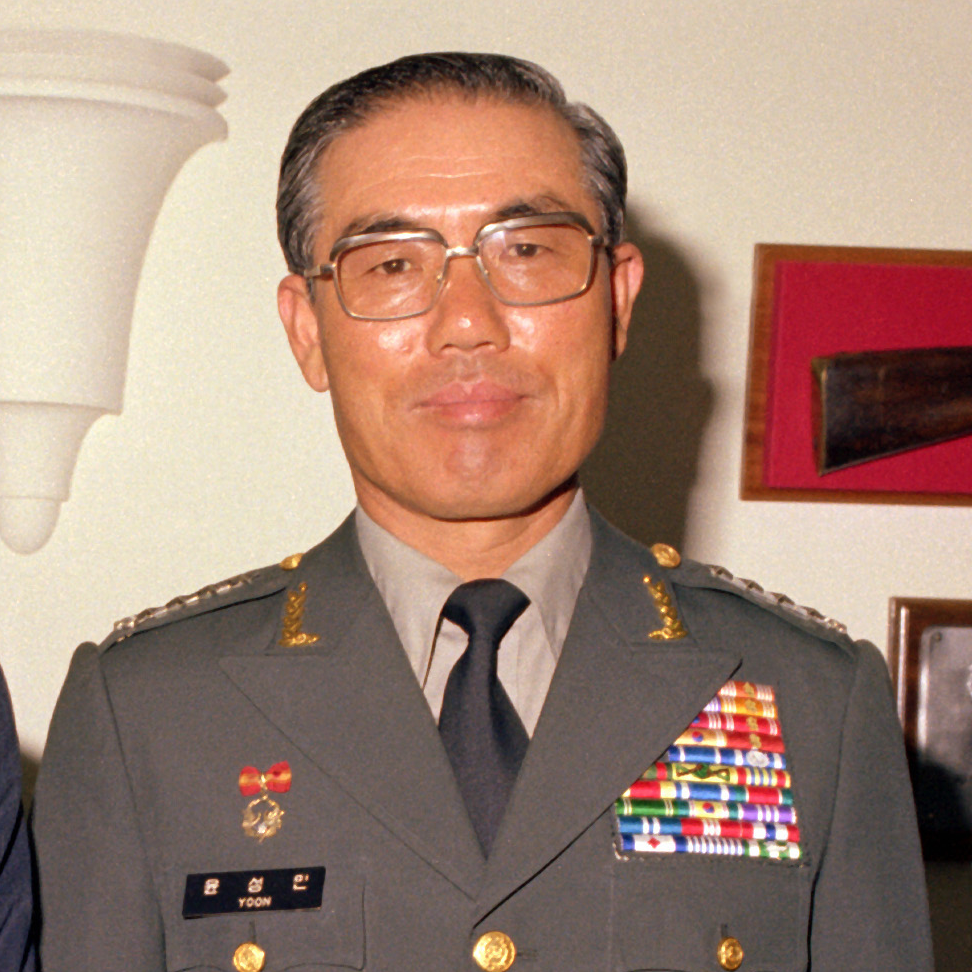
- Yoon as Minister of National Defense in 1982
- Born: 15 October 1926; Muan County, Korea, Empire of Japan
- Died: 6 November 2017 (aged 91) Seoul, South Korea
- Allegiance: South Korea
- Branch: Republic of Korea Army
- Service years: 1950–1982
- Rank: General
- Commands: Republic of Korea Army Deputy Chief of Staff; Commander of the I Corps; Chairman of the Joint Chiefs of Staff
- Conflicts: December 12th Coup
- Other work: Minister of National Defense (1982–1986); Chairman of the Board of Directors of the Korea National Oil Corporation; Chairman of the Korea Textile Association; Standing Advisor of Hyundai Oil & Oil Industry

Yoon Sung-min (Korean: 윤성민; Hanja: 尹誠敏; 15 October 1926 – 6 November 2017) was a retired general of the Republic of Korea Army, businessman and politician who served as the 23rd Minister of National Defense.

== Role in the December 12th Coup ==
At the time of the Coup d'état of December Twelfth, he was the Deputy Chief of Staff of the Korean Army. After the kidnapping of the Chief of Staff Jeong Seung-hwa, he automatically rose to the top position in the army chain of command and took in charge of the whole government forces. However, he was too indecisive to make a quick decision of summoning forces to quell the rebels. He was then easily deceived by the rebel leader Chun Doo-hwan that Yoon ordered a withdrawal of the government force, which gave rebels the opportunity to advance without resistance and eventually take control of the entire Seoul.

Unlike most other generals on the government side, who were either demoted or discharged after the incident, Yoon's incompetence during the coup ironically won him favour of Chun Doo-hwan, who promoted him to become the commander of the I Corps.

== Later life ==
Yoon later became the 23rd Minister of National Defence. After his retirement, he served as chairman of the board of directors of the Korea National Oil Development Corporation, chairman of the Korea Textile Association, standing advisor to Hyundai Precision Corporation, and a special member of the Alliance for Freedom and Democracy.
