= Oh Ja-bok =

- 오자복

Minister of National Defense
- In office 25 February 1988 – 4 December 1988
- President: Roh Tae-woo
- Preceded by: Chung Ho-yong
- Succeeded by: Lee Sang-hoon

Chairman of the Joint Chiefs of Staff
- In office 9 July 1986 – 30 December 1987
- Preceded by: Jung Jin-kwon
- Succeeded by: Choi Sae-chang

Personal details
- Born: 16 June 1930 Japanese-controlled Korea
- Died: 25 August 2017 (aged 87) Seoul, South Korea
- Resting place: Daejeon National Cemetery
- Citizenship: South Korean
- Party: Independent
- Education: Myongji University

Military service
- Allegiance: South Korea
- Branch/service: Republic of Korea Army
- Rank: Jiang (General)
- Commands: Republic of Korea Armed Forces
- Battles/wars: Korean War

Oh Ja-bok (Korean: 오자복; June 16, 1930 – August 25, 2017) was a South Korean politician and former military officer who served as Chairman of the Joint Chiefs of Staff and as Minister of National Defense.

== Biography ==
After graduating from the College of Law at Myongji University, he was commissioned as an officer in the Republic of Korea Army through the Gapjong (Type A) officer candidate program. He became the first officer from this program to attain the rank of full general. In 1986-1987 he served as Chairman of the Joint Chiefs of Staff and in 1988 he served as Minister of National Defense under the administration of President Roh Tae-woo. During the Chun Doo-hwan administration, he chaired the subcommittee on culture and public information for the Special Committee for National Security Measures. In this capacity, he was involved in the 1980s policies that banned private tutoring for students and promoted the liberalization of universities.
