= Park Hee-do (general) =

South Korean army general officer

Chief of the Republic of Korea Army
- In office 16 December 1985 – 11 June 1988
- President: Chun Doo-hwan; Roh Tae-woo
- Preceded by: Hwang Young-si
- Succeeded by: Lee Jong-gu

Personal details
- Born: Park Hee-do; 22 July 1934 (age 92) Keishōnan Province, Korea, Empire of Japan

Military service
- Allegiance: South Korea
- Army: Republic of Korea Army
- Years of service: 1956–1988
- Rank: Daejang General
- Commands: 1st Airborne Special Forces Brigade; Chief of Staff of Republic of Korea Army

Korean name
- Hangul: 박희도
- Hanja: 朴熙道
- RR: Bak Huido
- MR: Pak Hŭido

Park Hee-do (Korean: 박희도; Hanja: 朴熙道; born 22 July 1934) was a South Korean general and politician. He was a member of Hanahoe, a now-illegal group of the South Korean Army.

== Life ==
Park Hee-do was born in South Gyeongsang Province on 22 July 1934. When Park's two brothers became missing during the Korean War, Park decided to become a soldier. He entered the Korea Military Academy. Park as a cadet had a great grades. In March 1956, Park graduated the Military Academy and was appointed as Second lieutenant. In mid 1960s, Park joined Hanahoe by his friendship with Chun Doo-hwan, and Roh Tae-woo. In 1975, Park was promoted to Brigadier general. In 1975, Chun Doo-hwan pleaded Jeong Byeong-ju, the supreme commander of Special forces, to make Park to be the commander of 1st Airborne Special Forces Brigade, which was successful.

In 1976, the Korean axe murder incident happened. Park Chung Hee ordered Park to destroy four illegal checkpoints of Korean People's Army. Park selected 64 most well trained men to destroy the checkpoints. 64 men successfully destroyed the checkpoints. But, since this was not agreed with United States Forces Korea, this brought pressure to Park. But by help from his fellow generals, Park was able to endure the pressure. In 1978, when spies from North Korea came to South Korea, some members of Park's brigade went to North Korea through Imjin River. Chief of Staff of South Korean Army, Lee Se-ho tried to resign Park but, Jeong Byeong-ju who preferred Park prevented Lee from resigning him. But after a year, Park betrayed Jeong Byeong-ju during the Coup d'état of December Twelfth. Park's 1st Airborne Special Forces Brigade was ordered to stay wherever they were. But, Park also got orders from Chun Doo-hwan to go to Seoul and occupy the Republic of Korea Army Headquarters and Ministry of National Defense. Park followed the order from Chun. Park's brigade found out No Jae-hyeon, the minister of National Defense. This helped the arrest of Jeong Byeong-ju. For merits of Coup, Park was promoted to Major General. He became a major general and received command of 26th Mechanized Infantry Division. A year later, Park became Lieutenant general and the commander of Special forces. On 16 December 1985, Park was appointed as the Chief of Staff of South Korean Army.

In mid-July 1987, he caused controversy by stating off-the-record that "something unhappy might happen" were opposition candidate Kim Dae-jung elected in that year's upcoming election, which led the ruling Democratic Justice Party to distance itself from the military, distance the military as a whole from his remarks, and give in to calls for explicitly establishing the political neutrality of the military upon introduction of the revised constitution. In June 1988, Park retired from the army. That same month, he accused politicians of fracturing the military in the name of democratization. In particular, he was quoted as saying that "In the name of democratization and the open-door policy, helmets and army-shoes are ridiculed on the podium of the election sites. I cannot help but be greatly angered and anguished over such a humiliation on the army." In 1992, Park tried to flee to Los Angeles with his wife when Kim Young-sam was expected to be elected. After the election of Kim Young-sam, Park went to jail via trial, but was released several years later.

Park maintained contact with Chun Doo-hwan through 2019. When Park Chung Hee's daughter, Park Geun-hye, became the president, he supported her. Currently, he is an activist in far-right politics of Korea.
