= Joint Chiefs of Staff (South Korea) =

Board of military leaders of South Korea

Joint Chiefs of Staff of the Republic of Korea
- 대한민국 합동참모본부 大韓民國 合同參謀本部
- Insignia of the Joint Chiefs of Staff
- Founded: June 1963; 63 years ago
- Country: South Korea
- Garrison/HQ: Yongsan District, Seoul
- Website: Official website

Commanders
- JCS Chairman: General Jin Young Seung (Appointed)
- Army Chief of Staff: General Kim Kyu-ha
- Chief of Naval Operations: Admiral Kang Dong-gil
- Air Force Chief of Staff: General Son Sug Rag
- JCS Vice Chairman: Lieutenant General Kwon Daewon

Insignia
- Flag

The Joint Chiefs of Staff of the Republic of Korea (Korean: 대한민국 합동참모본부, Hanja: 大韓民國 合同參謀本部; RR: Daehanminguk Habdongchammobonbu) is a group of chiefs from each major branch of the armed services in the South Korean military. Unlike the United States' counterpart which is primarily advisory, the Chairman of the Joint Chiefs of Staff has actual operational control over all military personnel of South Korea's armed forces. The National Command Authority runs from the President and the Minister of National Defense to the Chairman and then to the Operational Commands of the service branches, bypassing the headquarters of each service branch. Currently there are five Operational Commands in the Army, two in the Navy (including the Marine Corps) and one in the Air Force.

== History ==
It was created in May 1954 and assumed its current name in 1963, though there had been the Supreme Command of the Armed Forces dating from 1948.

All (regular) members of the Joint Chiefs of Staffs are four-star generals and admirals, though the deputy chairman in the past has been a three-star lieutenant general or vice admiral intermittently. Traditionally, the chairman is chosen from the Army (with one previous and one current exceptions as October 2013) while the deputy chairman is selected from either the Navy or the Air Force.

The Commandant of the Marine Corps, legally subordinate to the Chief of Naval Operations of the Republic of Korea Navy, may attend Joint Chiefs of Staff meetings when discussing matters related to the Marine Corps.
