= Ministry of National Defense (South Korea) =

Government ministry of South Korea

Ministry of National Defense of the Republic of Korea
- 국방부
- Ministry flag

- Ministry headquarters

Agency overview
- Formed: 15 August 1948; 78 years ago
- Jurisdiction: Government of South Korea
- Headquarters: 22, Itaewon-ro, Yongsan-gu, Seoul, South Korea; 37.533528°N 126.977694°E
- Annual budget: ₩57.01 trillion US$44.2 billion (2023)
- Minister responsible: Kang Shin-chul, Minister of National Defense
- Deputy Minister responsible: Lee Doo-hee,Deputy Minister of Defense
- Child agencies: Defense Acquisition Program Administration; Military Manpower Administration
- Website: Official MND website in English; Official MND website in Korean

Korean name
- Hangul: 국방부
- Hanja: 國防部
- RR: Gukbangbu
- MR: Kukpangbu

The Ministry of National Defense (MND, Korean: 국방부) is a department within the government of the Republic of Korea (ROK) and responsible for the military branches of South Korea.

== History ==
The Ministry of National Defense was established on 15 August 1948 and located at Yongsan-dong, Yongsan District, Seoul. It was established following the foundation of ROK in 1948, superseding the Department of Internal Security (DIS, 국내경비부) in charge of Southern Korean armed forces under the United States Army Military Government (USAMGIK) during the Allied occupation era. During Coup d'état of December Twelfth, the ministry was occupied by 1st Airborne Special Forces Brigade commanded by Park Hee-do. In 2018, the Ministry has agreed to respect the results from its Special Investigation Committee on the Gwangju Uprising in which MD Helicopters MD 500 and UH-1H were used to fire on protesting citizens.

The Ministry of National Defense is allegedly active in military-level censorship such as book banning and screening of mobile apps within the military hierarchy.

In April 2024, South Korean and the United Kingdom navies conducted joint patrols around the Korean Peninsula to enforce UN sanctions against North Korea's nuclear and missile programs. The mission aimed to intercept illicit shipping, following the Downing Street Accord signed by the leaders earlier. Canada and New Zealand also contributed to sanctions enforcement in the region. However, challenges arose, with Russia vetoing a resolution to renew the panel monitoring sanctions enforcement against North Korea.

== Agencies ==
- Defense Acquisition Program Administration (DAPA)
- Military Manpower Administration (MMA)

== Logo ==
1948~Current

== See also ==
- Republic of Korea Armed Forces (ROKAF)
- Republic of Korea Army (ROKA)
- Republic of Korea Navy (ROKN)
  - Republic of Korea Marine Corps (ROKMC)
- Republic of Korea Air Force (ROKAF)
- Conscription in South Korea
- Joint Chiefs of Staff (ROK JCS)
- Ministry of National Defense Building
