= Korea National Defense University =

University in Nonsan, South Korea

- 국방대학교
- Type: National
- Established: 1955
- Location: Nonsan, South Korea
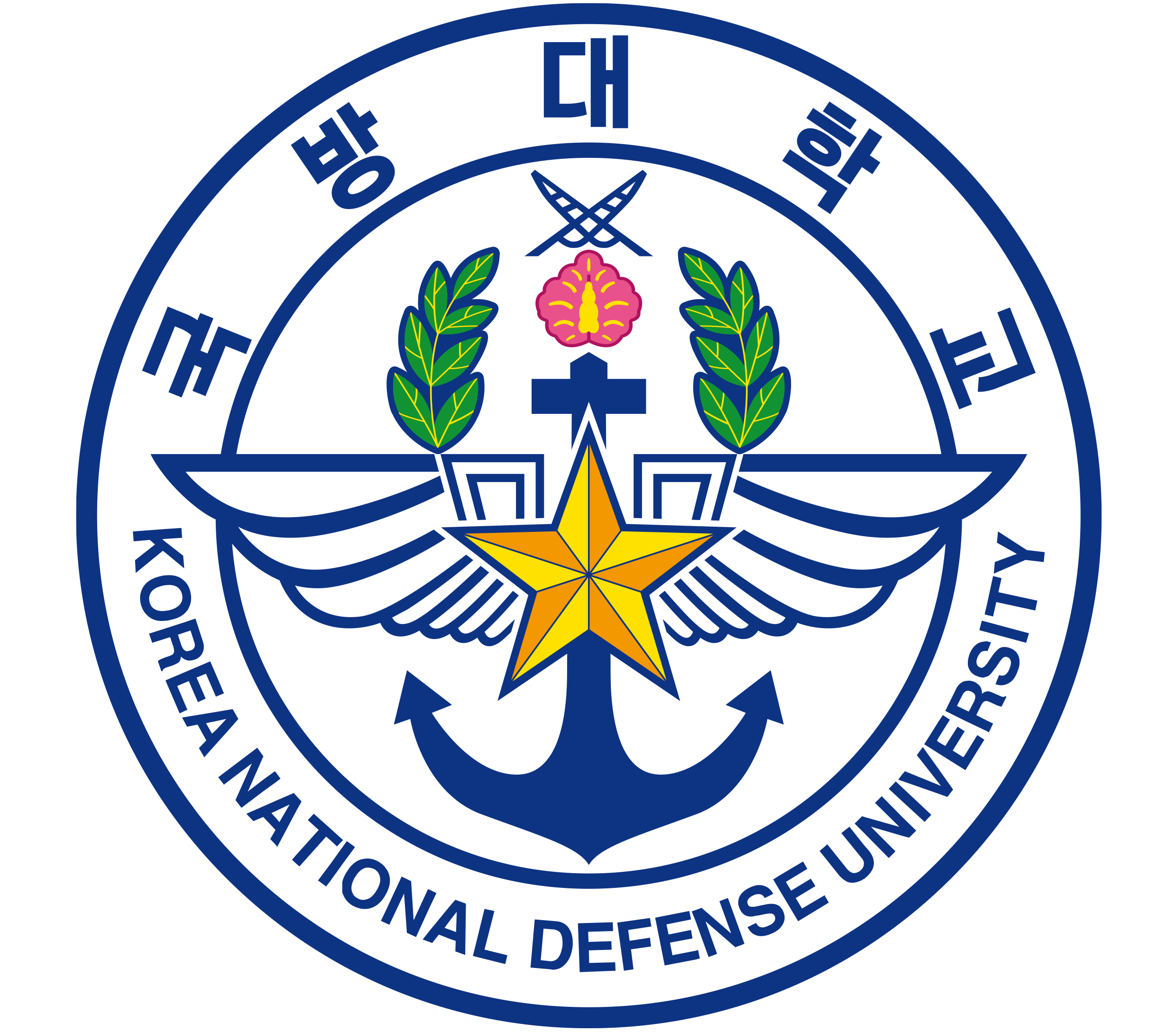

Korean name
- Hangul: 국방대학교
- Hanja: 國防大學校
- RR: Gukbang daehakgyo
- MR: Kukpang taehakkyo

Korea National Defense University (Korean: 국방대학교) is a national university located in Nonsan, South Chungcheong Province, South Korea. It was founded in 1955. It got its current configuration in 2000. The university was situated in Seoul from its founding until its relocation to Nonsan, South Chungcheong Province in 2017.

== Structure ==
- Republic of Korea Peace Keeping Operations Center
- Graduate School of National Security
- Graduate School of National Defense Management
- Professional Training Institute
- Research Institute for National Security Affair(RINSA)

== President ==
The president of Korea National Defense University is appointed by Minister of National Defense and it is stated that only General officer, usually Lieutenant general from Republic of Korea Army are eligible. However, from December 2021 Major general were appointed to this position.

== See also ==
- List of national universities in South Korea
- List of universities and colleges in South Korea
- Education in Korea
