= Republic of Korea Army Infantry School =

Insignia of the Republic of Korea Army Infantry School

Republic of Korea Army Infantry School (육군보병학교) is a college located in Jangseong, South Korea.

== History ==
The school initially started as a infantry school for the Department of Internal securities during the United States Army Military Government in Korea in February 1948, but was opened with its current name in 1949 in Siheung. The school moved to Jangseong in the 1990s.
