= Jin Young Seung =

South Korean air force general

- 진영승

Chairman of the Joint Chiefs of Staff
- Incumbent
- Assumed office 30 September 2025
- President: Lee Jae Myung
- Preceded by: Kim Myung-soo

Personal details
- Born: 12 March 1969 (age 57) Sacheon, South Gyeongsang Province South Korea
- Education: Korea Air Force Academy (B.S); Yonsei University (M.S-CIS)

Military service
- Allegiance: South Korea
- Branch/service: Republic of Korea Air Force
- Years of service: 1991 - Present
- Rank: General
- Unit: Chairman of the Joint Chiefs of Staff; Strategic Command; Director of Strategic Planning, Joint Chiefs of Staff; Air Combat Command; 19th Fighter Wing; 55th Training Group; 159th Fighter Squadron, 19th Fighter Wing

Jin Young Seung (Korean: 진영승; born 12 March 1969) is a South Korean Air Force general who currently serves as the incumbent Chairman of the Joint Chiefs of Staff since his appointment to the post by President Lee Jae Myung on 30 September 2025. Prior to his appointment to the post, Jin formerly held command as the first commander of the Republic of Korea Strategic Command and also formerly served as Director of Strategic Planning, Joint Chiefs of Staff and as former Chief of Staff, Planning and Management at the Air Force Headquarters. Jin also served as commander of the Air Combat Command and as wing commander of the 19th Fighter Wing.

Jin was commissioned into the Republic of Korea Air Force in 1991 as a fighter pilot flying the F-4 D and the KF-16C and later served into various roles within the Air Force, as he was primarily tasked in fighter squadron units and strategic planning positions, such as 19th Fighter Wing and the Office of Strategic Planning at the Joint Chiefs of Staff. Aside from these posts, Jin was also placed under training and education units and was also a former pilot of the Black Eagles aerobatic team. In September 2025, President Lee Jae Myung appointed Jin as the nominee for the position of the Chairman of the Joint Chiefs of Staff and was later approved within the same month.

== Early life and education ==
Jin was born on 12 March 1969 at Sacheon, South Gyeongsang Province. He later completed his elementary school at the Seopo Elementary School and later completed middle school at the Seopo Middle School. Jin later moved to Busan with his elder sisters and later completed high school at Hyegwang High School. Jin entered the Korea Air Force Academy in 1987 and later graduated in 1991, where he earned his bachelor's degree in Mechanical Engineering (BSME) and later held the rank of second lieutenant. On the same year, he completed his pilot training and later served as a fighter pilot. Jin later earned his master's degree in Computer Information at Yonsei University in 2000.

== Career ==
After completing his pilot training in 1991, Jin Young Seung was commissioned into the Republic of Korea Air Force and subsequently promoted to first lieutenant. From April 1993 to October 1994, he served as a fighter pilot with the 151st Fighter Squadron, 11th Fighter Wing, where he flew the F-4 D fighter aircraft. Following his promotion to captain in 1994, he was transferred to the 53rd Air Demonstration Group, also known as the Black Eagles aerobatic team, where he flew the Cessna A-37 B attack aircraft.

From 1997 to 2000, Jin served as an Evaluation and Safety Squadron pilot with the Black Eagles. During this period, he also held assignments as a pilot in the Operations and Intelligence Office in 1998 and as chief of the Planning Division in 2000. In March 2001, Jin was assigned to the 19th Fighter Wing, where he served in various operational and command positions until July 2007. From March to June 2001, he served as a pilot with the 161st Squadron, where he flew the KF-16C. Following his promotion to major in June 2001, he was assigned to the 3rd Squadron of the 159th Fighter Squadron, serving until January 2002. He subsequently served with the 1st Squadron of the 159th Fighter Squadron from January to May 2002.

From May to December 2002, Jin commanded the 4th Squadron of the 159th Fighter Squadron. He was subsequently assigned as a flight safety officer in the Inspector General's Office from December 2002 to December 2003. He then returned to operational command assignments with the 162nd Squadron, serving as commander of its 3rd Squadron from December 2003 to August 2004, its 2nd Squadron from August 2004 to August 2005, and its 1st Squadron from August 2005 to July 2006. From July 2006 to July 2007, he served as a flight commander of the 162nd Squadron. He also served as joint operational planning assistant director of the Operational Planning Division at the Air Force Operations Command, a position he held until August 2007. Jin served in the Operations Planning Division of the Air Force Operations Command on August 2007 to December 2009. From August to November 2007, he was the operations planning director of the division. During this period, he was promoted to lieutenant colonel.

From November 2007 to October 2008, he served as joint operations planning manager in the Preemptive Planning Division of the Air Force Operations Command. He was subsequently assigned to the command's Joint Operations Planning Division from October to December 2008. From December 2008 to December 2009, he served as force operations planning head of the Operations Planning Division.

In December 2009, Jin was appointed commander of the 159th Fighter Squadron, 19th Fighter Wing, where he also flew the KF-16C. He held the position until December 2010. From January to December 2011, he served with the Air Force Division of the Joint Chiefs of Staff, followed by an assignment as a planning officer in the same division from December 2011 to December 2012. Jin was named as director of Standardization and Evaluation at the 19th Fighter Wing from January to December 2013. During this period, he was promoted to colonel.

In January 2014, he briefly served as commander of the Air Force Academy Cadet Training Squadron before being appointed commander of the 55th Training Group at the Korea Air Force Academy in February 2014. He held the position until December 2014, during which he also flew the T-103 training aircraft. He would later serve as Air Operations Squadron commander of the 19th Fighter Wing from December 2014 to December 2015. During his tenure, he supervised the squadron's deployment to Alaska for the 2015 Red Flag–Alaska exercise.

From December 2015 to December 2016, he served as chief of the Power Requirements Division of the Air Force Headquarters' Planning and Management Division. He subsequently became director of the Air Power Division of the Power Planning Department at the Joint Chiefs of Staff, serving from December 2016 to January 2018. In December 2017, he was promoted to brigadier general. He later became the deputy director of Force Requirements in the Planning and Management Staff Office at Air Force Headquarters from January to December 2018. In December 2018, he was appointed commander of the 19th Fighter Wing, serving in the position until December 2019.

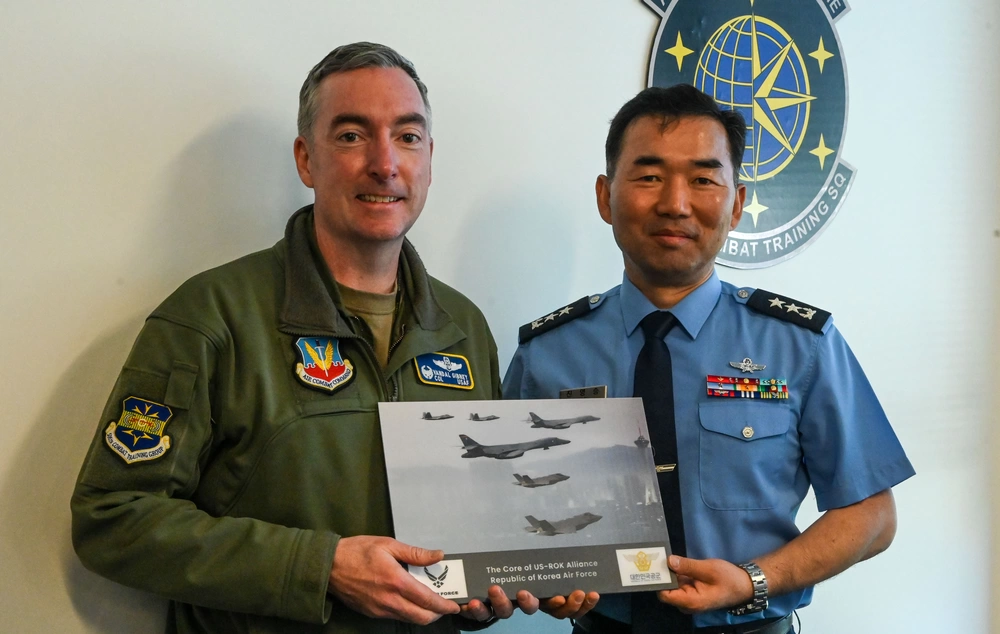
Then-Major General Jin Young Seung presenting a gift to US Air Force Colonel Aaron Gibney during Jin's visit to Howard Hughes Operation Center in Las Vegas, Nevada (2023).

From December 2019 to December 2020, Jin served as Director of the 2nd Division of the Joint Chiefs of Staff, Force Planning Division. Jin was promoted to the rank of major general in December 2020 and placed as the Chief of Staff of the Information Planning Division, Air Force Headquarters from December 2020 to December 2021. Jin was later named as the commander of the Air Combat Command December 2021 to December 2022. After his term as Air Combat Commander, Jin was named as Chief of Staff of Planning and Management at the Air Force Headquarters from December 2022 to November 2023. Jin was promoted to lieutenant general in November 2023 and later placed under the Office of the Joint Chiefs of Staff where he served as Director of Strategic Planning from November 2023 to October 2024. On 1 October 2024, Jin was later named as the first inaugural commander of the Strategic Command, a newly-formed command based from the United States Strategic Command and is tasked for strategic deterrence and conventional strike operations.

=== Chairman of the Joint Chiefs of Staff ===
On 1 September 2025, Jin was named by as the nominee for the Chairman of the Joint Chiefs of Staff. His appointment is the second time that a three-star ranking officer will be named as Chairman of the Joint Chiefs of Staff following his predecessor Admiral Kim Myung-soo, who was previously named as the commander of the Republic of Korea Fleet before being appointed by former President Yoon Suk Yeol for the post. Jin is also the first air force commander in five years to be named for the position following General Won In-choul's appointment to as Chairman of the Joint Chiefs of Staff on 23 September 2020. His appointment also comes as part of President Lee's effort to strengthen public trust and confidence in the military after the 2024 martial law crisis and intensifying missile developments by North Korea that prompted the South Korean military to intensify its national deterrence posture. Jin's promotion to the rank of general and appointment for the post was approved by the National Assembly on 29 September 2025 and later took helm of the post as Chairman of the Joint Chiefs of Staff on the following day, 30 September 2025, and later replaced Admiral Kim Myung-soo. During his stint as Chairman of the Joint Chiefs of Staff, Jin emphasized the need to intensify the military's readiness posture and strengthening the border units along the Korean Demilitarized Zone.

Jin also apologized for the military's involvement during the martial law crisis and pushed for strengthening the military's deterrence posture by enhancing of “three-axis” system; namely the Kill Chain preemptive strike platform, the Korean Air and Missile Defense system, and the Korea Massive Punishment and Retaliation strategy. Jin also inspected military units deployed at Gyeongju ahead of the 2025 APEC Summit, where he conducted a command flight within the area's waters aboard a Boeing P-8 Poseidon aircraft and was briefed on counterterrorism and security planning and operations.

== Dates of promotion ==
Insignia	Rank	Date
	Second Lieutenant (Sowi)	1991
	First Lieutenant (Jungwi)	1992
	Captain (Daewi)	October 1994
	Major (Soryeong)	June 2001
	Lieutenant Colonel (Jungnyeong)	November 2007
	Colonel (Daeryeong)	January 2013
	Brigadier General (Junjang)	December 2017
	Major General (Sojang)	December 2020
	Lieutenant General (Jungjang)	November 2023
	General (Daejang)	30 September 2025

== Awards from Military Service ==
- Minister of National Defense Award (December 2010)
- Presidential Citation (October 2015)
- Cheonsu Medal, Order of National Security Merit, Third Class (September 2023)
