= Choi Yong-duk =

South Korean general (1898–1969)

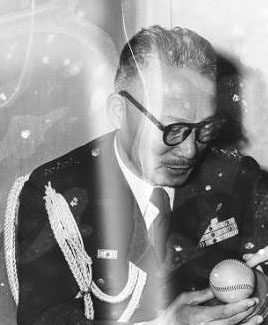
- Choi in 1953

12th Minister of Information and Communication of Korea 10th Minister of Information and Communication of the First Republic of Korea
- In office 2 June 1960 – 22 August 1960
- Preceded by: Oh Jeong-su
- Succeeded by: Lee Sang-chul

2nd Chief of Staff of the Air Force of Korea Lieutenant General
- In office 1 December 1952 – 19 November 1954
- Preceded by: Kim Chung-yul
- Succeeded by: Kim Chung-yul

Personal details
- Born: 19 September 1898
- Died: 15 August 1969 (aged 70)
- Profession: Military officer; politician; bureaucrat

Choi Yong-duk (Korean: 최용덕; 19 September 1898 – 15 August 1969) was a Republic of Korea Air Force lieutenant general, nationalist independence activist, military officer, politician, and diplomat. He served as the 2nd Chief of Staff of the Air Force.

== Biography ==
He was born in Hanseong (Seoul), Korean Empire and early in his life moved to China. In 1916, he graduated from the Chinese Army Officer School and in 1920, with the recommendation of Seo Wal-bo, he entered the Chinese Aviation School and became a pilot. He served as an instructor at the Chinese Air Force Officer School, a chief of the seaplane squadron, and an airbase commander.

In 1922, he met Kim Won-bong and joined the Righteous Army. He supported many political figurées in the China. He endorsed the activities of Kim Sang-ok, Kim Si-hyun, and others.

In 1940, he graduated from the Chinese Army University and was appointed as the Chief of Staff of the General Staff Department of the Korean Liberation Army in September. He then served as the chairman of the Aeronautical Construction Committee of the Provisional Government of the Republic of Korea, the chief of staff of the Korean Liberation Army, and played an active role until the liberation in 1945.

After the liberation, on 22 August 1945, he accepted defectors from the Manchurian Army, including Park Chung Hee. In early 1946, he returned to Korea. In Korea Choi founded the Aeronautical Construction Association. He was appointed as the first President of the Aeronautical Construction Association the same year, in 1946. Along with Kim Jung-ryul and Jang Deok-chang, he made efforts for the establishment of the Air Force. Later the same year, in August 1946, he was appointed Commander of the Defense Security Command Aviation Unit.

The U.S. military did not recognize his service in the Chinese army and demanded that he undergo military education again. Therefore, in April 1947, he entered the Korean Military Academy and was commissioned as a second lieutenant in the Army in May. In July, he was promoted and appointed as the commander of the Army Aviation Unit.

After the founding of South Korea, in August 1948, he was appointed as the Deputy Minister of National Defense.

Subsequently, he served as an Air Force base commander, the principal of the Air Force Academy, and the Chief of Operations and Plans at the Air Force Headquarters. On 30 November 1948, he was appointed as Commander of the Army Aviation Command.

He participated in the Korean War on June 25, 1950. After the armistice, from 1 December 1952 to 19 November 1954, he served as the 2nd Chief of Staff of the Air Force. From 2 June 1960 to 22 August 1960, he served as the Minister of Personnel and as Minister of Information and Communication.

Choi retired from the military duty in 1956 and was honorary granted the title lieutenant general. In 1961, Choi was appointed ambassador to the Republic of China (Taiwan).

He is also the lyricist of the song "The Air Force". In 1962, he received the Order of Military Merit for National Foundation Independence Medal (독립장).

On 15 August 1969, Choi died, at the age of 71. In his testament Choi wrote "If I die, please dress me in the Air Force uniform.".
