= Tiger Scout =

Tiger Scout may refer to:

- Tiger Scout (Korea Scout Association), the highest rank in Korean Scouting
- Tiger Cubs, the youngest level of Cub Scouting (Boy Scouts of America), formerly a separate membership section
