= Sanago =

South Korean YouTuber and artist (born 1991/1992)

- Born: Kwon Won-jin; 1991 or 1992 (age 33–34)
- Education: Hannam University

YouTube information
- Channel: sanago
- Subscribers: 4.05 million
- Views: 935 million

Korean name
- Hangul: 권원진
- RR: Gwon Wonjin
- MR: Kwŏn Wŏnjin

YouTube channel name
- Hangul: 사나고
- RR: Sanago
- MR: Sanago
- Last updated: September 2025

Kwon Won-jin (Korean: 권원진; born 1991 or 1992), also known as Sanago (사나고), is a South Korean YouTuber and artist. He specializes in using 3D pens (pens that emit plastic, similar to a 3D printer) to create three-dimensional artworks.

He graduated from Hannam University's Department of Arts and Culture in 2011. After graduating, he worked part time as an art teacher and freelance video producer. He started learning how to use 3d pens in 2016 and started his YouTube channel in January 2018. He named the channel after his then pet cat. By June 2020, he had accumulated 2.6 million subscribers, with 1.2 million of those being from overseas. In 2023, he had a pop-up store at the Pangyo branch of the Hyundai Department Store.
