= Lee Jong-sup =

South Korean army general

- 이종섭
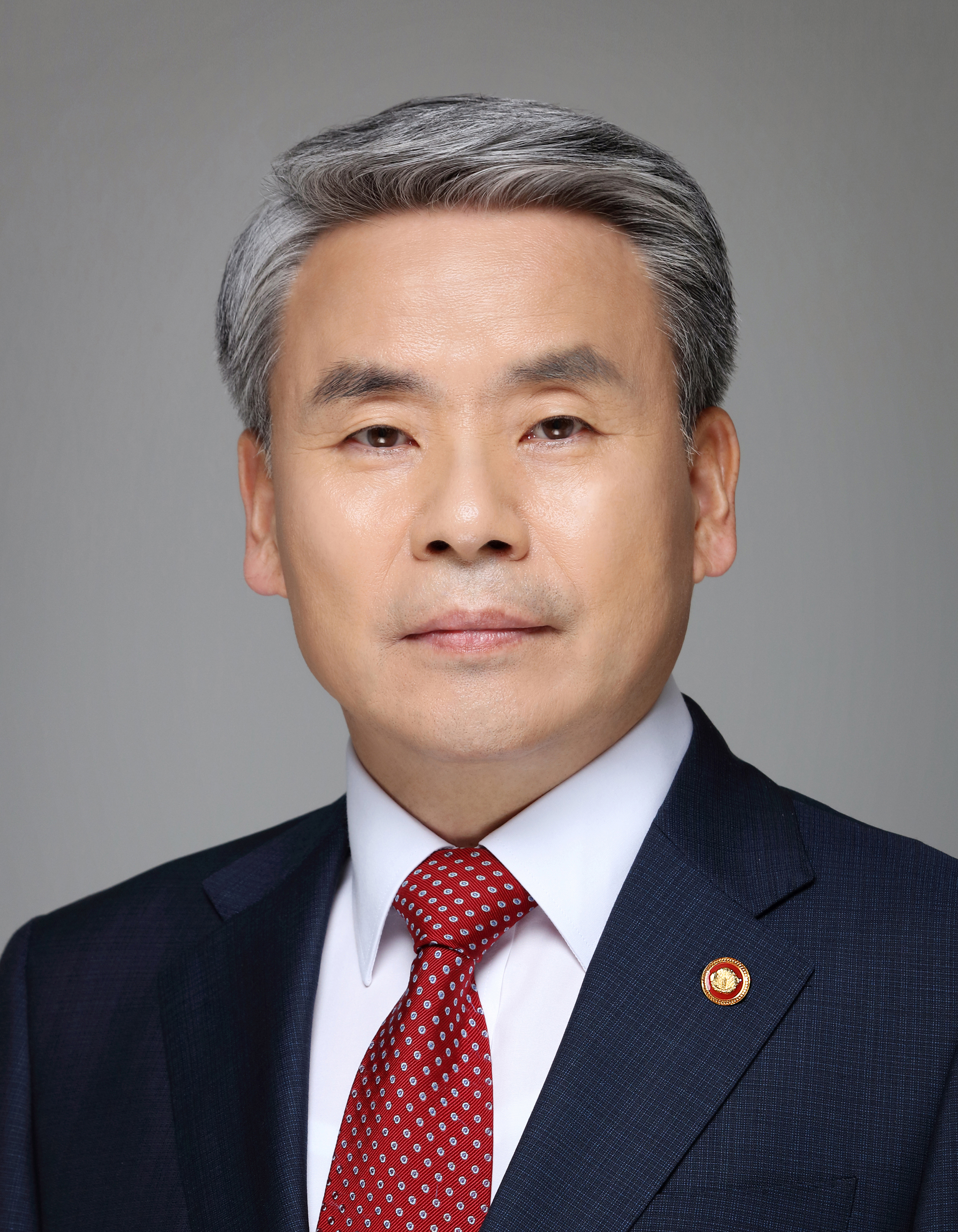
- Lee in 2022

South Korean Ambassador to Australia
- In office 12 March 2024 – 29 March 2024
- President: Yoon Suk Yeol
- Prime Minister: Han Duck-soo
- Preceded by: Kim Wan-jung
- Succeeded by: Sim Seung-seob

Minister of National Defense
- In office 10 May 2022 – 7 October 2023
- President: Yoon Suk Yeol
- Prime Minister: Han Duck-soo
- Preceded by: Suh Wook
- Succeeded by: Shin Won-sik

Vice Chairman of the Joint Chiefs of Staff
- In office 26 September 2017 – 22 November 2018
- President: Moon Jae-in
- Preceded by: Lee Bum-rim
- Succeeded by: Won In-choul

Personal details
- Born: 20 August 1960 (age 66) Yeongcheon, South Korea
- Education: Korea Military Academy; Tennessee State University
- Awards: Legion of Merit

Military service
- Allegiance: South Korea
- Branch/service: Republic of Korea Army
- Years of service: 1984–2019
- Rank: Lieutenant general

Korean name
- Hangul: 이종섭
- Hanja: 李鐘燮
- RR: I Jongseop
- MR: I Chongsŏp

Lee Jong-sup (Korean: 이종섭; Hanja: 李鐘燮; 20 August 1960) is a South Korean retired army lieutenant general and former vice chairman of the Joint Chiefs of Staff who served as the minister of national defense from May 2022 to October 2023.

== Ambassador ==
=== Appointment ===
On March 12, 2024, he was officially inaugurated as the South Korean ambassador to Australia. Lee Jong-sup said in Korean:

"Since the establishment of their diplomatic relations in 1961, the two countries have developed friendly and cooperative relations in various fields, including in diplomacy, military, defense, economy, culture and people-to-people exchanges, and have cooperated closely together in upholding peace, stability and prosperity on the Korean Peninsula and in the region."

=== Resignation ===
Lee resigned himself as ambassador to Australia on March 29, 2024, and President Yoon Suk Yeol approved his resignation the same afternoon.

Military offices
Preceded by Lee Bum-rim	Vice Chairman of the Joint Chiefs of Staff; 2017–2018	Succeeded by Won In-choul
Political offices
Preceded by Suh Wook	Minister of National Defense; 2022–7 October 2023	Succeeded by Shin Won-sik
