= Kim Yong-woo =

South Korean scout and politician (1912–1985)

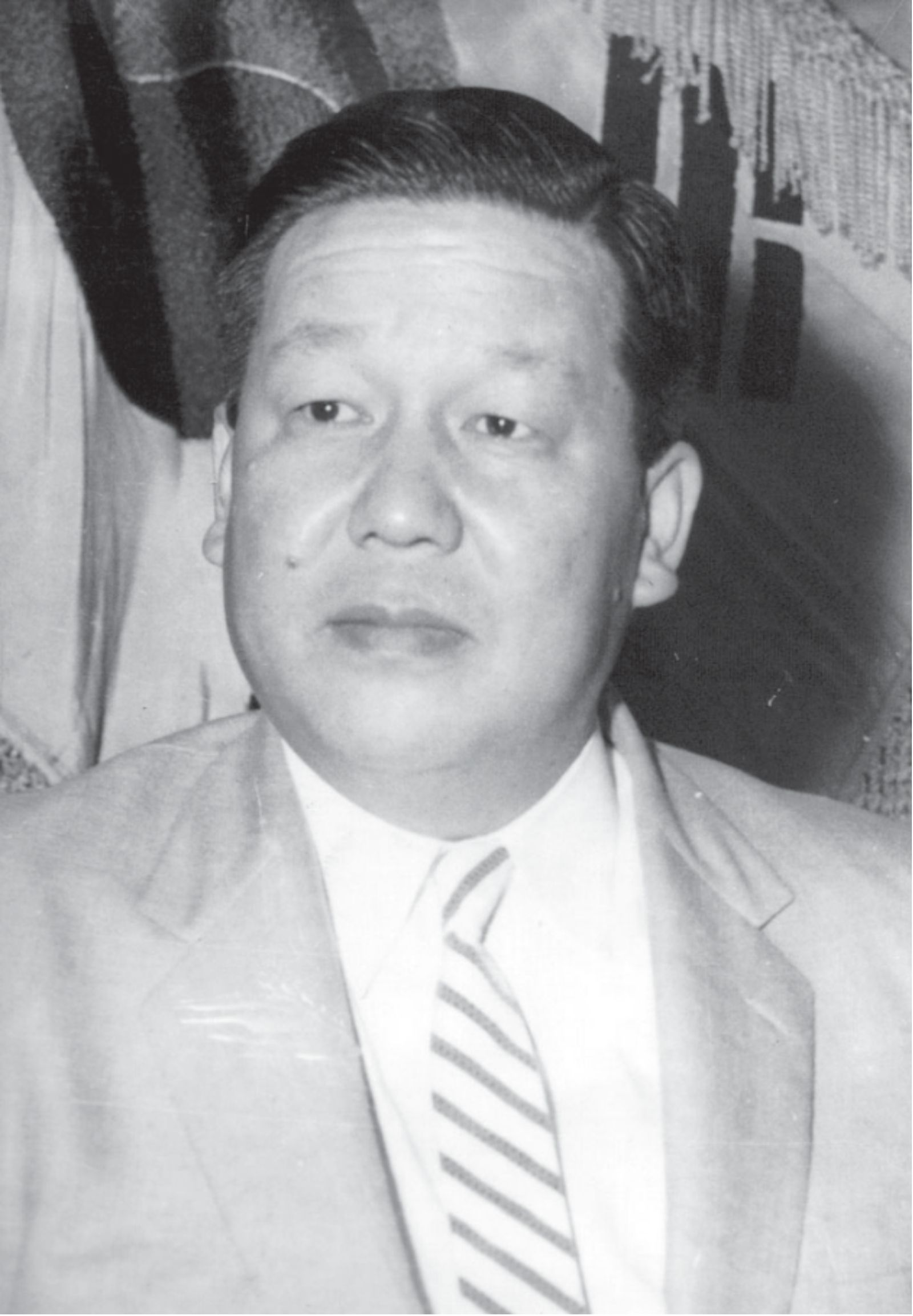

6th Minister of National Defense
- In office May 26, 1956 – July 6, 1957
- President: Syngman Rhee
- Prime Minister: Position abolished
- Vice President: Ham Tae-young; Chang Myon
- Preceded by: Sohn Won-yil
- Succeeded by: Kim Chung-yul

Personal details
- Born: April 29, 1912
- Died: September 13, 1985 (aged 73)
- Known for: Chief Scout of the Korea Scout Association

Korean name
- Hangul: 김용우
- Hanja: 金用雨
- RR: Gim Yongu
- MR: Kim Yongu

Art name
- Hangul: 삼농
- Hanja: 三儂
- RR: Samnong
- MR: Samnong

Childhood name
- Hangul: 재용
- Hanja: 在用
- RR: Jaeyong
- MR: Chaeyong

Kim Yong-woo (Korean: 김용우; Hanja: 金用雨; April 29, 1912 – September 13, 1985) was the first Tiger Scout and former Minister of National Defense, served as the Chief Scout of the Korea Scout Association.

In 1975, Kim was awarded the 100th Bronze Wolf Award, the only distinction of the World Organization of the Scout Movement, awarded by the World Scout Committee for exceptional services to world Scouting, at the 25th World Scout Conference.
