= Girl Scouts Korea =

South Korean Girl Scouting organization

Girl Scouts of Korea
- Girl Scouts of Korea
- Headquarters: 47 Yulgok-ro (163, Anguk-dong), Jongno-gu
- Location: Seoul
- Country: South Korea
- Founded: 1946
- Membership: 78,366
- Affiliation: World Association of Girl Guides and Girl Scouts
- Website www.girlscout.or.kr

Girl Scouts Korea (Korean: 한국걸스카우트연맹) is the national Girl Scouting/Guiding organisation of South Korea. It was founded in 1946 and became a full member of the World Association of Girl Guides and Girl Scouts (WAGGGS) in 1963.

As of 2022, the organisation had 6,237 members.

== History ==
Girl Scouting started in Korea in 1946, shortly after the end of Japanese colonial rule. Its expansion was temporarily halted by the in 1950, although girls and leaders actively participated in relief works and service activities. After the Korean War, great efforts were made to organise the system, decide on uniforms and badges, and publish handbooks.

In recent decades the organisation has focused on initiatives to improve the position of girls and women, environmental activities, peace education, and training girls and young women to become global citizens through international events and exchanges.

== Program ==
The association organises girls and young women into the following age-based sections:

- Twinkler Scout – ages 4 to 5
- Gaenari (Brownie Girl Scout) – ages 6 to 8
- Jindalrae (Junior Girl Scout) – ages 8 to 11
- Sonyeodae (Cadette Girl Scout) – ages 12 to 14
- Yeonjangdae (Senior Girl Scout) – ages 15 to 17
- Yeongudae (Young Leader Girl Scout) – ages 18 to 21
- Seongindae (Adult Troop) – ages 21 and older

Extension troops are also available for girls with disabilities and working girls.

The Motto is 준비 (Junbi), meaning "Preparation".

== See also ==
- Korea Scout Association (the equivalent boys' organisation)

== See also ==
- Korea Scout Association
- Girl Scouts (film)
