= Kim Myung-soo (admiral) =

South Korean Navy admiral

- 김명수
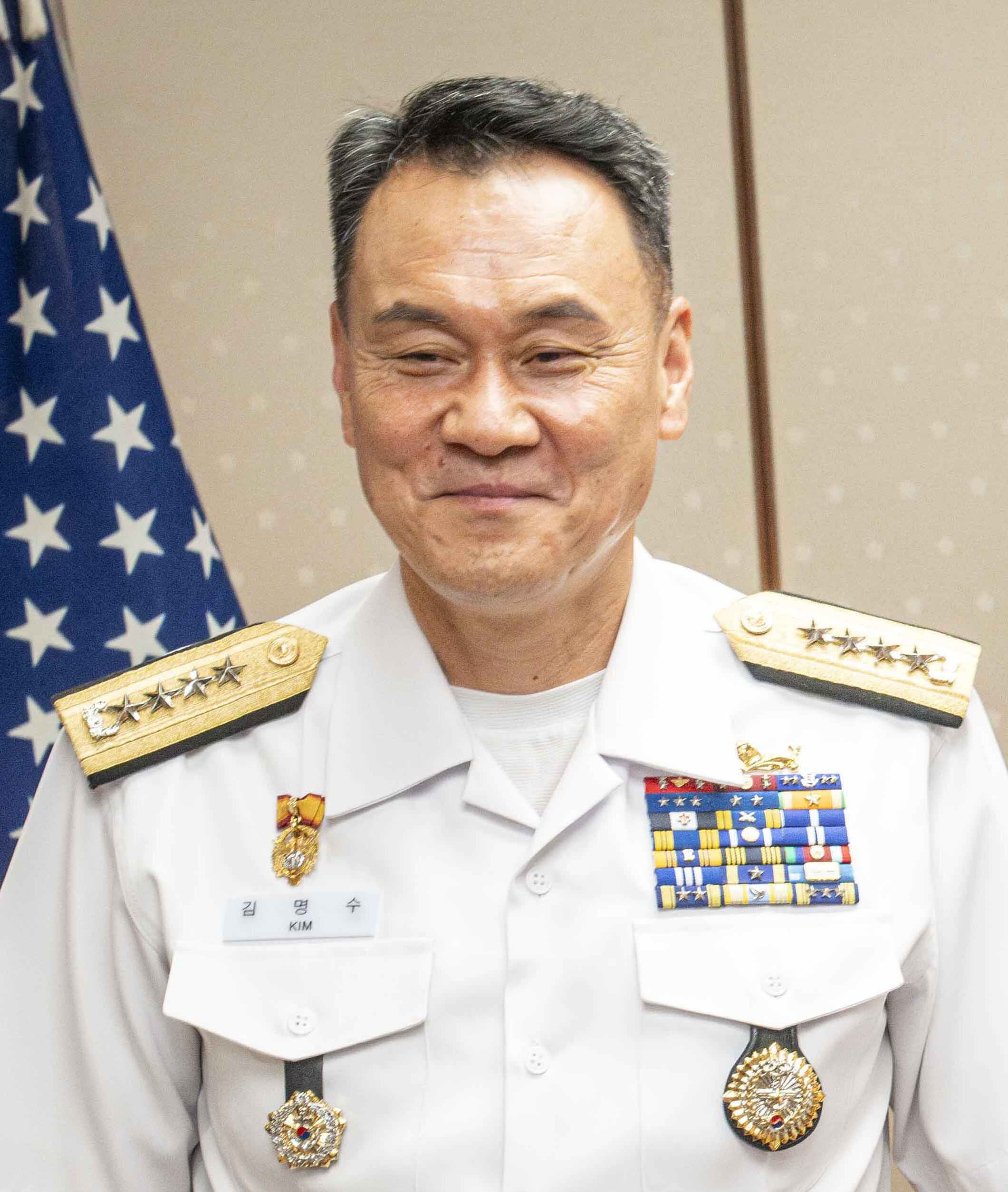
- Kim in 2024

Chairman of the Joint Chiefs of Staff
- In office 25 November 2023 – 30 September 2025
- President: Yoon Suk Yeol; Han Duck-soo (acting); Choi Sang-mok (acting); Lee Jae-myung
- Preceded by: Kim Seung-kyum
- Succeeded by: Jin Young Seung

Personal details
- Born: March 8, 1967 (age 59) Gimcheon, North Gyeongsang Province, South Korea
- Education: Korea Naval Academy (B.S); Korea National Defense University (M.S); Kookmin University (PhD)

Military service
- Allegiance: South Korea
- Branch/service: Republic of Korea Navy
- Years of service: 1989 – 2025
- Rank: Admiral
- Commands: Chairman of the Joint Chiefs of Staff; Republic of Korea Fleet; Vice Chief of Naval Operations; Korea Naval Academy; 1st Fleet; Maritime Operations Center; ROKS Sejong the Great (DDG-991); ROKS Munmu the Great (DDH-976); ROKS Yangyang (MSH 571); PKM 337

Kim Myung-soo (Korean: 김명수; born 1967), is a South Korean Navy admiral who served as Chairman of the Joint Chiefs of Staff from 25 November 2023 to 30 September 2025. Prior to his appointment to the post, Kim held command of various ships and naval commands, as he formerly served as commander of the Republic of Korea Fleet, as Superintendent of the Korea Naval Academy, and as Commander of the 1st Fleet.

== Early life and education ==
Kim attended the Gimcheon High School in Gimcheon, North Gyeongsang. He graduated from the Korea Naval Academy Class 43 in 1989 at the top of his class and received the Presidential Award for his accomplishments. Kim earned his Master of Defense Science at the Korea National Defense University in 1992. In 2014, he received his PhD in political science and international relations from Kookmin University.

== Naval career ==
After graduating from the Naval Academy, he commissioned as Ensign in 1989, where he first served as a communications officer under the 11th Combat Squadron of the 1st Fleet. In 1990, he was promoted to Lieutenant Junior Grade and served as an officer-on-duty at the Joint Operations Command Center of the 108th Squadron, 1st Fleet. In December 1993 to 1994, Kim served as the commander of the PKM 337, a Chamsuri-class patrol boat. Kim later served the Naval Combat Development Group under the Weapon Systems Department and the Power Generation Department in 1999 to 2000, respectively, before being named as the commanding officer of the ROKS Yangyang (MSH 571) from 2001 to 2002, and was later appointed as Disciplinary Officer of the 8th Company, 2nd Battalion of the Naval Academy Cadet Corps from 2002 to 2003. In 2003, Kim served as a KDX Weapon System Instructor under the Naval Education and Training Command. Kim later served as the commanding officer of the ROKS Munmu the Great (DDH-976) in 2006. From 2007 to 2009, Kim served as the operations officer of the ROKS Sejong the Great (DDG-991). During his term as operations officer, Kim utilized his expertise and skills in missile detection and tracking as he carried out missile detection missions for the first detection of the launch of North Korea's Kwangmyŏngsŏng-2 in April 2009. Kim also spearheaded the detection of the Kwangmyŏngsŏng-3 launcher on 13 April 2012 as the commander of the ROKS Sejong the Great. In the same month, Kim received the Presidential Personal Commendation for this accomplishment.

Kim also served as the Chief of the 2nd Operations Division at the Joint Chiefs of Staff Headquarters in November 2015, as the Commander of the Maritime Battle Group 2, which serves under the 2nd Fleet, in October 2016, and as Director of the Maritime Operations Center in January 2018. Kim was later named as the Commander of the 1st Fleet in December 2018, before being named as Deputy Chief of Naval Operations, Intelligence and Operations in November 2019. In May 2020, Kim was named as the Superintendent of the Korea Naval Academy, and was named as Director in the Foreign Intelligence Directorate at the Korea Defense Industry Association in December 2020.

Kim was named as the Director General in the Defense Management Reform Bureau at the Ministry of National Defense in December 2021, before serving as the Vice Chief of Naval Operations from June 2022 to December 2022. In December 2022, Kim was named as the Commander of the Republic of Korea Fleet.

=== Chairman of the Joint Chiefs of Staff ===
On October 29, 2023, he was promoted to admiral in the second general appointment of the Yoon Suk-yeol administration and was nominated as a candidate to succeed Army General Kim Seung-kyum as Chairman of the Joint Chiefs of Staff Committee. Kim's appointment is described as a surprise as his appointment for the chairman of the Joint Chiefs of Staff is a first time since 1994 that a three-star ranking officer will be named as Chairman of the Joint Chiefs of Staff, and is also a first time in 10 years that an admiral of the navy has been appointed as the Chairman of the Joint Chiefs of Staff since Admiral Choi Yoon-hee, who served from October 16, 2013 to October 7, 2015, who was the first Chairman of the Joint Chiefs of Staff under the Park Geun-hye government. Kim's appointment also comes amidst the rising importance of strengthening the nation's naval capabilities, due to the rise of incursions of the Korean People's Navy in the Yellow Sea's Northern Limit Line. Admiral Kim Myung-soo took office on 25 November 2023.

On 10 March 2024, Admiral Kim visited the air force operational center for air and missile defense exercises of the Republic of Korea Air Force at the Combat Aviation Command in Daegu. During his visit, Admiral Kim called on the personnel to "deal an overwhelming blow to the enemy in case of any provocation." According to local media reports, the visit comes amidst fears of possible nuclear missile tests by North Korea, in response of the South Korean-American "Freedom Shield" exercises.

==== Martial law crisis ====
On 3 December 2024, former South Korean President Yoon Suk Yeol declared martial law over claims of "anti-state forces" collaborating with "North Korean communists" undermining the country and as his presidency faces a political deadlock with the opposition Democratic Party. During his stint as Chairman of the Joint Chiefs of Staff, Kim's subsequent position as the Martial Law Commander was sidelined and was later given to General Park An-su, the former Chief of Staff of the Army. Prior to the declaration of martial law, Kim was not able to receive any prior instructions or briefing about the planned martial law declaration before it was announced, and only knew about the declaration afterwards when he returned to his office at around 10:30 p.m. on 3 December. After the lifting of the martial law declaration six hours after its declaration, Kim emphasized the armed forces' role in protecting the public while respecting both political neutrality and constitutional order.

During the plenary sessions after the short-lived martial law, the crisis also revealed alleged frictions between Kim and the Minister of National Defense Kim Yong-hyun moments prior to the declaration. On 28 November 2025, Minister Kim reportedly told the JCS combat control room to fire warning shots and conduct strikes on the points of origin of trash balloons landing into the country from North Korea. In response, Admiral Kim opposed the plan and later didn't follow Minister Kim's orders, stating that "It is different from the Defense Department's response principles so far". Kim also added that if the strikes are done incorrectly, the move could lead to a local war and can cause damage to the civilian population. Minister Kim later told Admiral Kim that he "had no sense" and that "Kim should be gotten rid of".

Another rumor that was circling around the defense hierarchy after the declaration of martial law is the alleged proposal to remove Admiral Kim as the Chairman of the Joint Chiefs of Staff before the in order to fully implement martial law plans, according to memos made by Lieutenant General Yeo In-hyung in a meeting on 9 November 2024. Aside from Admiral Kim's position, three other generals are planned to be replaced in their positions, which included the Deputy Commander of the ROK/US Combined Forces Command General Kang Shin-chul, commander of the Republic of Korea Army Ground Operations Command General Kang Ho-Pil, and Chief of Naval Operations Yang Yong-mo. Yeo would also make efforts to stop former President Yoon's order to declare martial law in peacetime but to no avail and would later expressed his regret for his participation in discussions related to the martial law proposal.

== Awards in military service ==
- Presidential Award (1989)
- Presidential Personal Commendation (2012)
