= Jeong Kyeong-doo =

South Korean defense minister

- 정경두
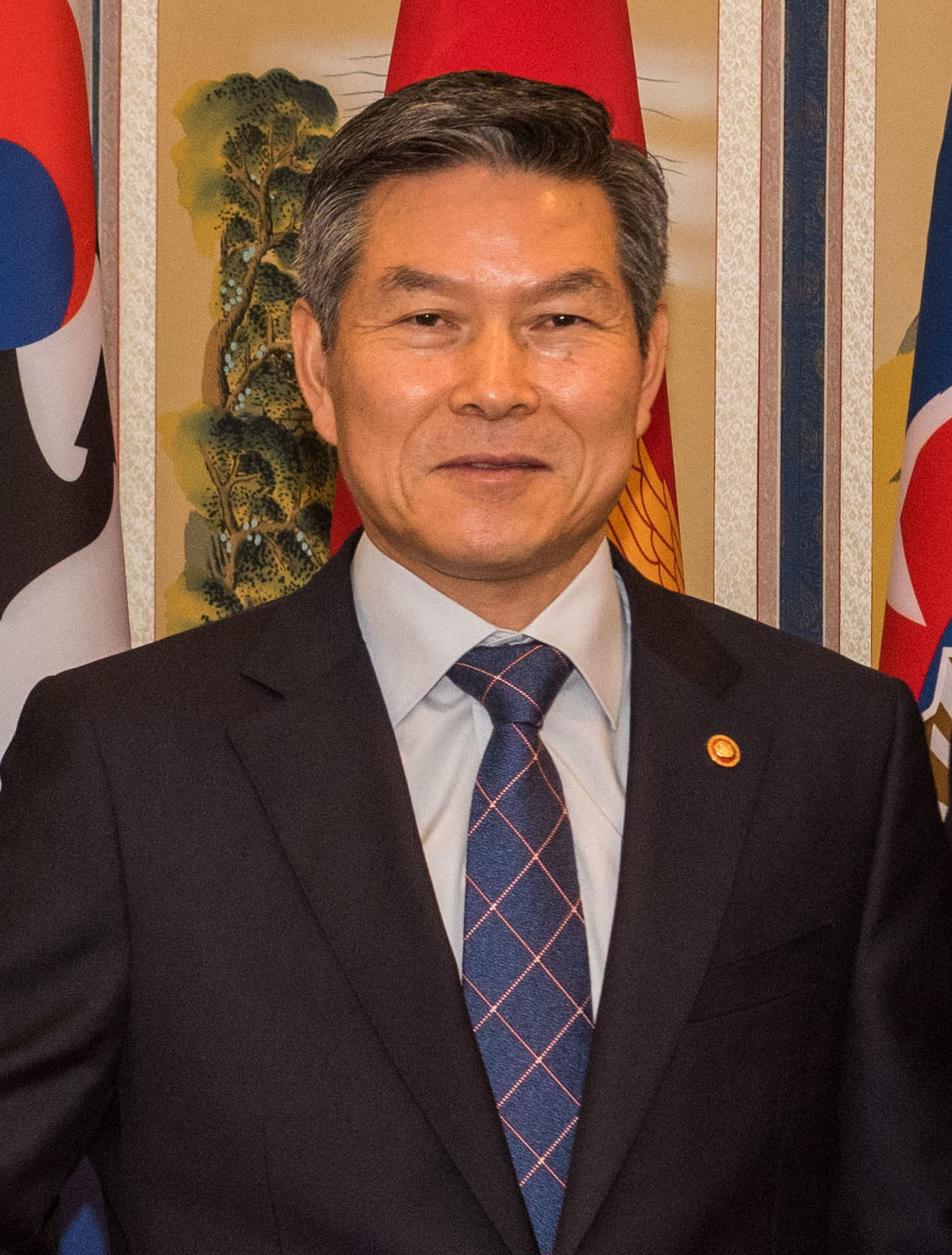
- Jeong in 2018

Minister of National Defense
- In office 21 September 2018 – 18 September 2020
- President: Moon Jae-in
- Preceded by: Song Young-moo
- Succeeded by: Suh Wook

Chairman of the Joint Chiefs of Staff
- In office 20 August 2017 – 21 September 2018
- President: Moon Jae-in
- Preceded by: Gen. Lee Sun-jin
- Succeeded by: Gen. Park Han-ki

Chief of Staff of the Air Force
- In office 17 September 2015 – 11 August 2017
- President: Park Geun-hye
- Preceded by: Gen. Choi Cha-kyu
- Succeeded by: Gen. Lee Wang-keun

Personal details
- Born: 13 September 1960 (age 66) Jinju, South Korea
- Education: Korea Air Force Academy; Hannam University

Military service
- Allegiance: South Korea
- Branch/service: Republic of Korea Air Force
- Years of service: 1982–2020
- Rank: General

Korean name
- Hangul: 정경두
- Hanja: 鄭景斗
- RR: Jeong Gyeongdu
- MR: Chŏng Kyŏngdu

Jeong Kyeong-doo (Korean: 정경두; born 13 September 1960) is a South Korean politician and military officer who served as the 46th minister of national defense from 2018 to 2020. He was a former fighter pilot and General of the Republic of Korea Air Force serving as Chairman of the Joint Chiefs of Staff and the Air Force Chief of Staff.

== Early life and education ==
Jeong was born on September 13, 1960, in Jinju, South Korea. He graduated from Daea High School in 1978. Jeong graduated from the Korea Air Force Academy in 1982. He studied at the Air Command and Staff Course (in 1995) and the Air War Course (in 2005) of the Japan Air Self-Defense Force (JASDF), Jeong also has a MA in Management of the Graduate School of Business, Hannam University in 2002.

== Career ==
Jeong received his commission from the Air Force Academy in 1982. In 2004, he was promoted to Colonel, serving as Chief of the Force Requirement Division at the Air Force HQ from 2006 to 2008, and Cadets Group Commander, Air Force Academy from 2008 to 2009. After his promotion to brigadier general in 2009, he was made Commander of the 1st Fighter Wing in Gwangju Air Base (2009-2011). Other major assignments including Commander, Force Service Support Group-Gyeryongdae (2011), Deputy Chief of Staff (A-5) of the Air Force HQ (2011–2013), Commander of the Southern Combat Command (2013–2014), Vice Chief of Staff of the Air Force (2014–2015), Chief Director (J-5) of the Joint Chiefs of Staff (2015) before promoted to four-star rank to serve as the Air Force Chief of Staff in 2015.

Upon the beginning of Moon Jae-in's presidency in 2017, Jeong was appointed as chairman of Joint Chiefs of Staff - the second air force background to assume such post. In 2018 he was promoted to as Moon's second defense minister.

== Controversy ==
The "Republic of Korea Guardian Reserve Forces", a newly formed group of Korean Armed Forces retired generals and reservists led by General Paik Sun-yup, which its members included three former defense ministers, a former chief of the South Korean joint chiefs of staff, and commanders of the navy and marines, oppose the Sept. 19 agreement of President Moon Jae-in due to the engagement with North Korea has gone too far. The group of retired generals condemned Defense Minister Jeong Kyeong-doo for "pandering to politicians".

== Religion ==
Jeong follows the Protestantism religion.

== Effective dates of promotion ==
Promotions
Insignia	Rank	Date
	General	September 2015
	Lieutenant General	April 2014
	Major General	November 2011
	Brigadier General	April 2009
	Colonel	December 2004

Military offices
Preceded by Choi Cha-kyu	Chief of Staff of the Air Force; 2015–2017	Succeeded by Lee Wang-keun
Preceded by Lee Sun-jin	Chairman of the Joint Chiefs of Staff; 2017–2018	Succeeded by Park Han-ki
Political offices
Preceded by Song Young-moo	Minister of National Defense; 2018–2020	Succeeded by Suh Wook
