= Korea Scout Association =

South Korean Scouting organization

- Both the modern stylized emblem and this historic emblem feature the head of a tiger. Officially it symbolizes the "bravery of Korean Scouts". The Korean Peninsula was once within the tiger's historic range; this may also be an allusion to Korea's status as one of the Four Asian Tigers.
- 한국 스카우트 연맹
- Country: South Korea
- Founded: 1922
- Membership: 201,455
- Affiliation: World Organization of the Scout Movement
- Website http://www.scout.or.kr/

The Korea Scout Association (Korean: 한국스카우트연맹) is the national Scouting association of South Korea.

Scouting was founded in Korea in 1922 while under Japanese rule, and sent representatives to the first Far East Scouting competition in Beijing in 1924. However, it was banned by the occupation authorities from 1937 until August 15, 1945. It existed in all areas of the Korean peninsula prior to the Korean War in 1950. World Organization of the Scout Movement recognition came in 1953. The total membership in 2011 was 201,455 registered Scouts.

Dr. Kim Yong-woo, the first Tiger Scout and former Minister of National Defense was awarded the Bronze Wolf Award, the only distinction of the World Organization of the Scout Movement, awarded by the World Scout Committee for exceptional services to world Scouting, in 1975.

== History ==
=== Scouting during Japanese rule ===
Japanese military authorities did not consistently encourage the Scouting movement in occupied territories. Where local conditions were favorable, authorities would permit local Scouting or introduce Japanese-style Scouting, or Shōnendan, and sometimes even made this compulsory. On the other hand, where conditions were not favorable, and anti-Japanese sentiments were likely to be nurtured through Scouting, the authorities would prohibit it entirely. Scouting in Korea was prohibited by the Japanese occupation authorities from 1937 to 1945.

== Program and ideals ==
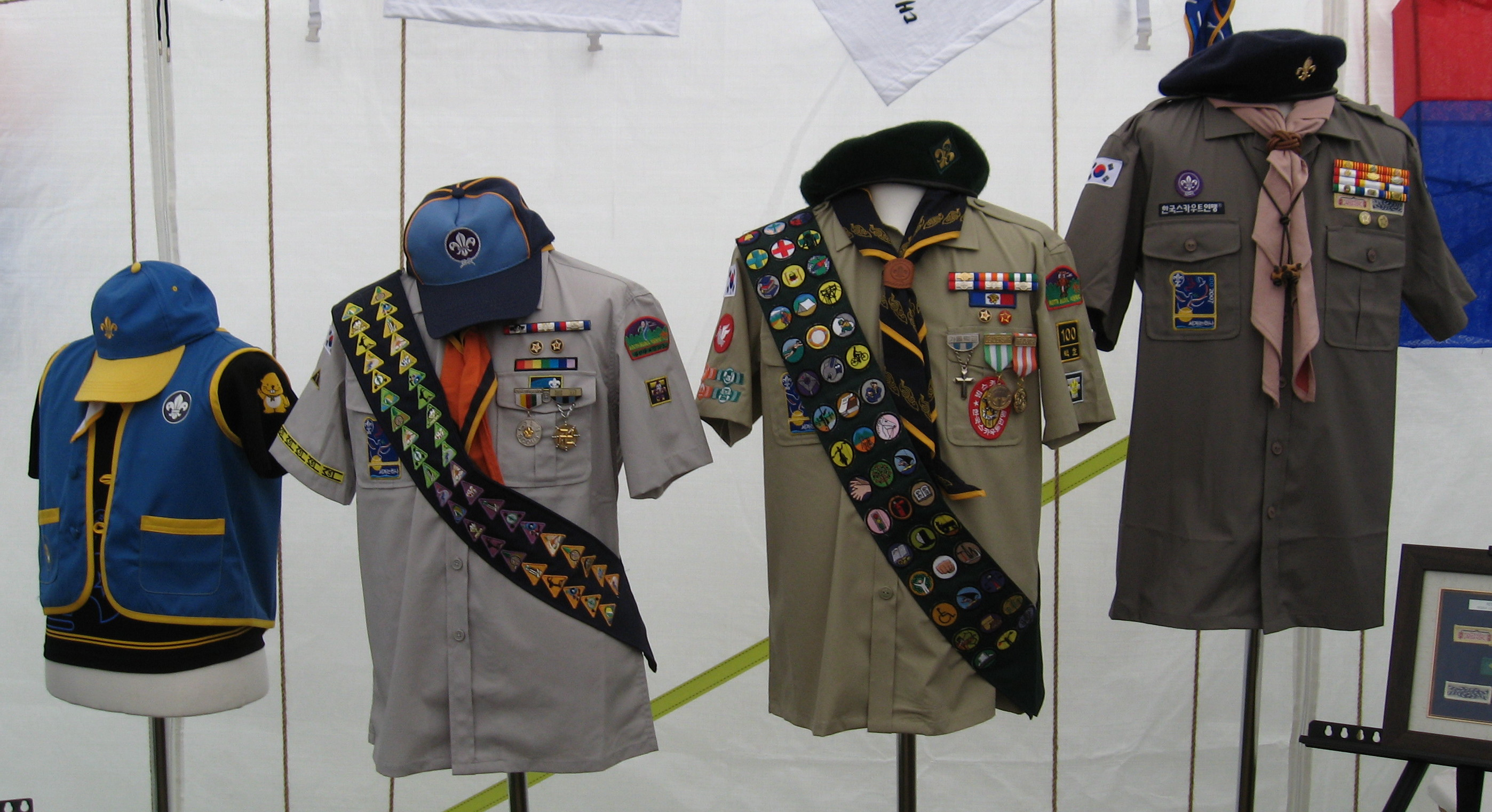
Uniforms (left to right): Beaver Scout, Cub Scout, Scout/Venture Scout, Rover Scout

- Korea Scout Association
- Hangul: 한국 스카우트 연맹
- Hanja: 韓國스카우트聯盟
- Revised Romanization: Hanguk Seukauteu Yeonmaeng
- McCune–Reischauer: Han'guk Sŭk'aut'ŭ Yŏnmaeng

The Tiger Scout is the highest rank and award the Scout and the Venture Scout may achieve.

An active Air Scout program is also popular.

The Scout Motto is 준비, pronounced jun bi, Preparation in Korean.

Officially the round-shaped outer petals of the new purple fleur-de-lis are based on the taeguk, symbolizing hope of reunification of the Korean peninsula. A tiger head, symbolizing bravery, is also featured.

=== Councils ===
The KSA operates and maintains 21 councils, 18 geographical, 3 religious, and a National Council for top-level staff and employees.

council	2015 membership	founding year	council badge or totem
Buddhism			a lotus flower
Busan	23,993 Scouts and 1,395 leaders	1963	seagull, the official bird of the city of Busan; the council has an organized sea-based water activity facility, and diverse Scout aquatic programs such as water rescue and first-aid
Catholic	2,163 Scouts and 854 leaders	2003	the second newest council in the KSA, and the first council based on religion; the symbol of the Catholic Council is Jesus in white caftan with magic wand
Chungbuk	12,795 Scouts and 1,053 leaders	1958	a boy and a girl in traditional Korean costume
Chungnam	19,503 Scouts and 1,467 leaders	1958	a turtle, which is slow but patient; council now specifically includes Sejong City
Daegu	16,434 Scouts and 1,421 leaders	1981	eagle, which represents courage and pioneering spirit; Daegu Council has had a relationship with Senshu District of Ōsaka Council, Scout Association of Japan since 1987
Daejeon	10,650 Scouts and 773 leaders	1989	Science Boy, Hankkumi, the symbol of Daejeon city as the City hosted Taejŏn Expo '93; Daejeon Council practices "Scouting for Community Service" by running a Scout troop in Daejeon juvenile reformatory
Gangwon	11,161 Scouts and 1,131 leaders	1958	little bear, the mascot of Gangwon Province, which hosted the 17th World Scout Jamboree at Seoraksan
Gwangju	9,334 Scouts and 712 leaders	1987	light spreading out to the world, as the nickname of Gwangju is the Village of Light
Gyeongbuk	21,208 Scouts and 1,602 leaders	1946	Cheonseongdae, the Joseon-era astronomy laboratory
Gyeongnam	15,981 Scouts and 1,650 leaders	1946	dinosaur caricature, as the most dinosaur footprints were found in this area; Gyeongnam Council has a youth training center which offers climbing, water activities, nature observation, and high adventure programs
Incheon	19,652 Scouts and 1,112 leaders	1923	a rose, formerly a dolphin wearing a Scout neckerchief; Incheon Council has international relationships with the Scout Association of Japan, the Boy Scouts of America, the Scouts of China, The Scout Association and the Boy Scouts of the Philippines
Jeju	4,251 Scouts and 803 leaders	1946	dol hareubang, the symbol of Jeju Island; Jeju Council has two campsites, and the 38th World Scout Conference was held in 2008 at the Jeju International Convention Center
Jeonbuk	12,020 Scouts and 2,273 leaders	1957	sinmyeongi traditional Korean drum; Jeonbuk Council has the Songgwang Training Center, and its programs includes climbing, survival shooting game, orienteering, and high adventure programs, and has international relationships with the Sri Lanka Scout Association and the Boy Scouts of the Philippines
Jeonnam	13,274 Scouts and 1,328 leaders	1951	Namdo and Nami, caricatures of a boy and a girl welcoming people with warm hugs; Jeonnam Council has the Suncheon Youth Hostel and Youth Training Center
North Gyeonggi	19,608 Scouts and 2,770 leaders	2001	a bird called "keunaksae", which lives in north Gyeonnggi area, the environmental mascot character of the area, saluting, and barbed wire, alluding to the region's proximity to the Korean Demilitarized Zone
North Seoul	29,511 Scouts and 2,947 leaders	1948/1990	a tiger called Wangbomi, the character of Seoul, similar to Hodori from the 1988 Summer Olympics held there; Seoul Council was established in 1948, and divided into South Seoul Council and North Seoul Council, which covers the northern area of Seoul south of the Han River, has an aquatic sports facility for canoeing, wind surfing, and rowboating, and has a relationship with Aichi Council, Scout Association of Japan
South Gyeonggi	49,975 Scouts and 7,171 leaders	1962	the mascot of Gyeonggi Province
South Seoul	32,278 Scouts and 2,863 leaders	1948/1990	symbol of Seoul City, which shows the mountain and river in Seoul with the Sun representing a bright future; Seoul Council was established in 1948, and divided into North Seoul Council and South Seoul Council, which covers the southern area of Seoul south of the Han River, and has a relationship with Ibaraki Council, Scout Association of Japan
Ulsan	6,015 Scouts and 352 leaders	1997	a character called haeuli, a sea creature akin to a dolphin, doing a Scout bow with a pear flower
Wŏn Buddhism		2007	a character called Wonmani, whose face shows the Chinese character for mind (心)

== World and regional events hosted ==
- 17th World Scout Jamboree, 1991
- 17th Asia Pacific Jamboree, 1996
- Asia Pacific Regional Youth Forum, 1996
- 21st Asia-Pacific/10th Korea National Jamboree, 2000
- Asia-Pacific Workshop on Youth Programme, 2000
- International Patrol Jamboree, 2002
- Asia Pacific Regional Workshop on PR, ICT and Marketing, 2003
- 25th World Scout Jamboree, Saemangeum, 2023

== Scouting in North Korea ==
flag of the Joseon Boys Army

North Korea shared a common Scout history with South Korea until 1950, but at present is one of only four of the world's independent countries that do not have Scouting. North Korea instead created the Young Pioneer Corps under the Korean Children's Union.

== See also ==
- Girl Scouts Korea
- World Buddhist Scout Brotherhood
- Simon Hang-Bock Rhee
- Kim Eun Gui
