= Park Han-ki =

South Korean General (born 1960)

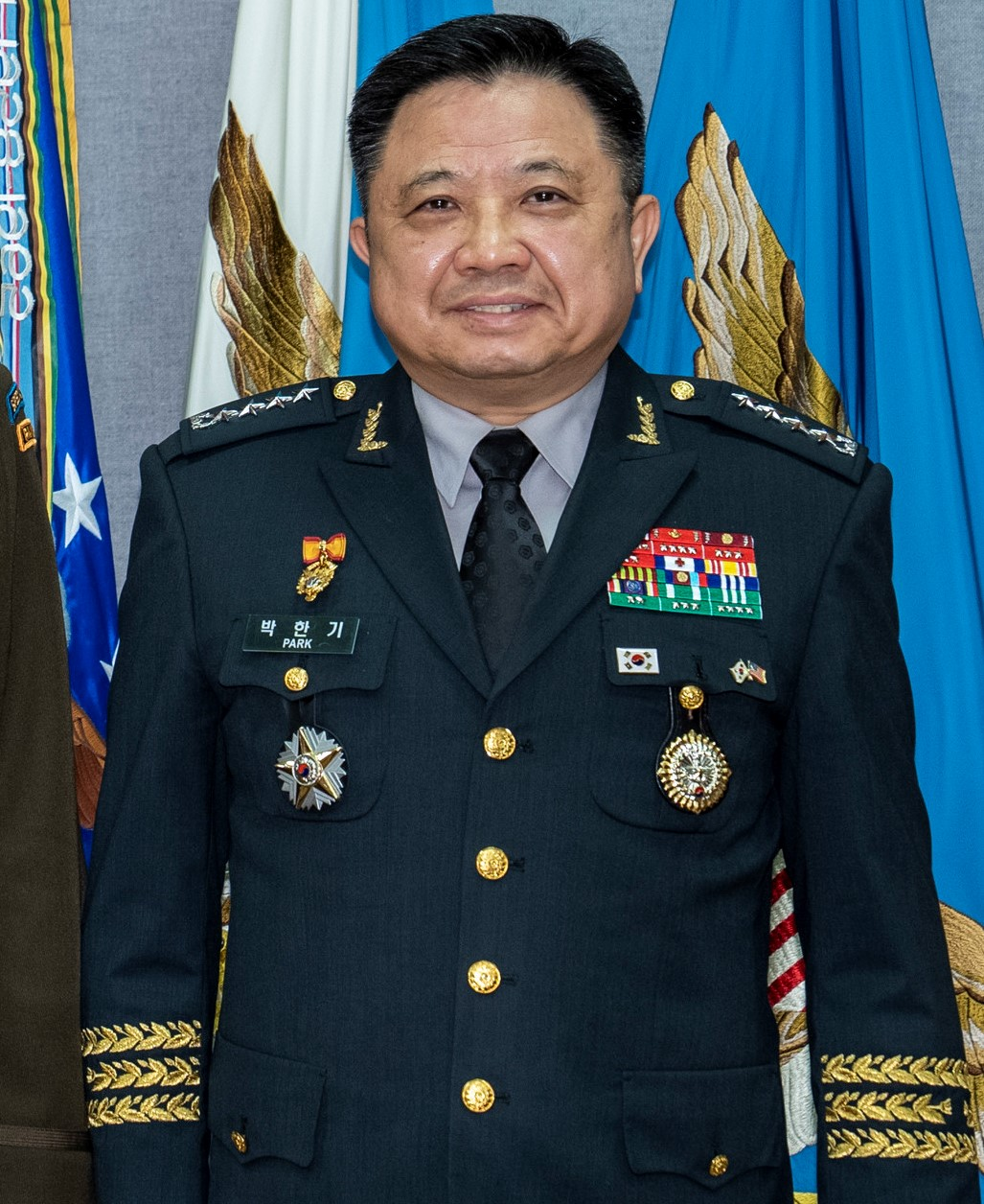
- Gen. Park Han-ki in 2019
- Born: January 16, 1960 (age 66); Buyeo, South Chungcheong Province, South Korea
- Military career
- Allegiance: South Korea
- Branch: Republic of Korea Army
- Service years: 1983-2020
- Rank: General
- Commands: Chairman of the Joint Chiefs of Staff; 2nd Operational Command, ROKA; I Corps, ROKA; VIII Corps, ROKA; Chief of Operations (G3); 53rd Infantry Division, II Corps, ROKA

Park Han-ki (Korean: 박한기) is a South Korean general who served as the 41st Chairman of the Joint Chiefs of Staff of the Republic of Korea Armed Forces from October 11, 2018, to September 23, 2020. Prior to his appointment, he held various positions in the Republic of Korea Army, such as the former commander of the 2nd Operational Command, the I Corps and the VIII Corps.

== Early life and education ==
He was born on January 16, 1960, in Buyeo County, South Chungcheong Province, South Korea. He was a member of the Reserve Officers' Training Corps program at the University of Seoul and was commissioned as second lieutenant in 1983 after graduating. He also completed programs in KAIST in 2010, and in Ajou University in 2017.

== Career ==
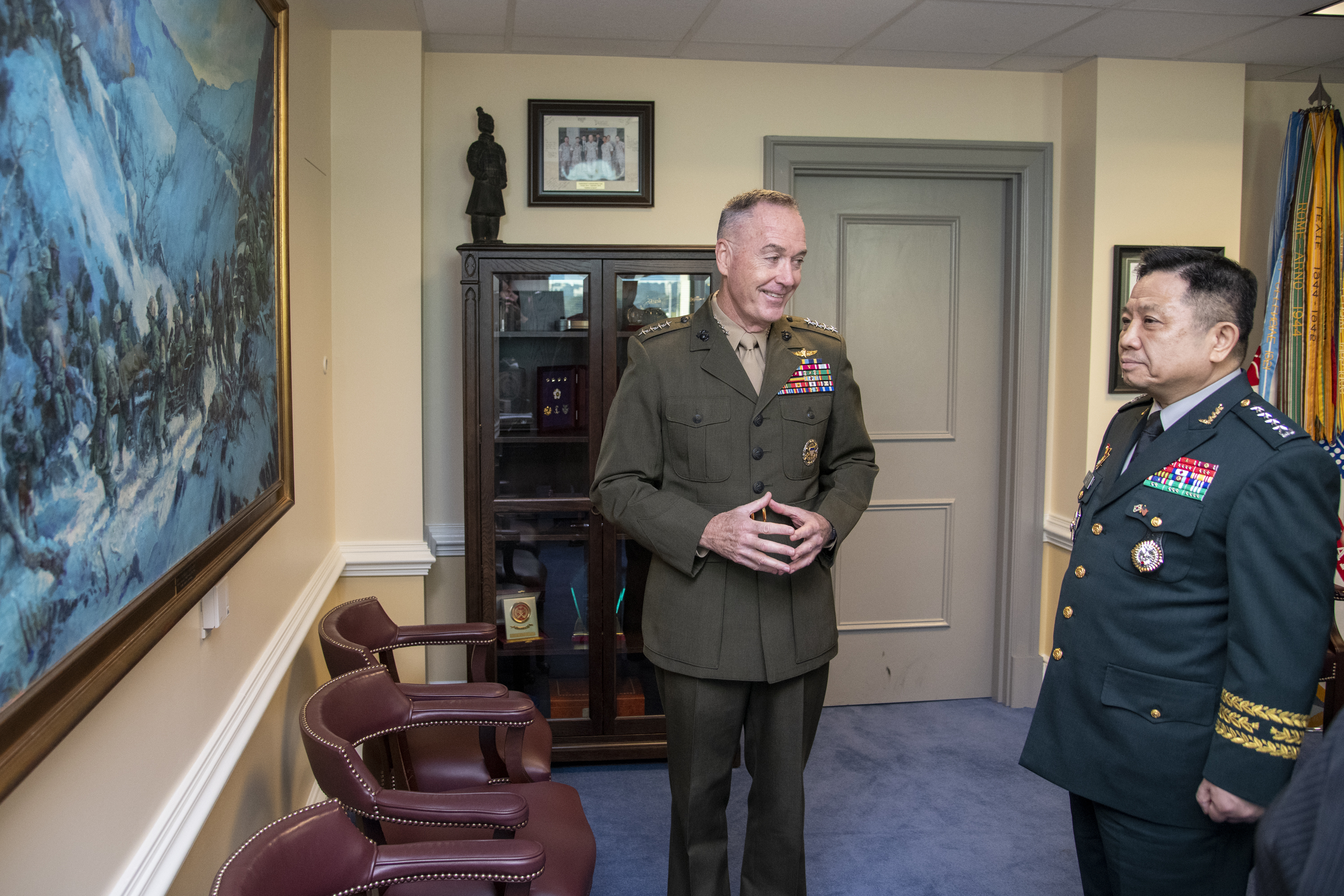
Park with Joseph Dunford at The Pentagon in 2018.

Park held various commands and positions in the South Korean Army, such as the 1st Battalion Commander of the 102nd Regiment, 17th Infantry Division in 1997, became Head of the 99th Regiment, 32nd Infantry Division in 2006, and served as the 2nd Operation Command Planning and Organization Director in 2008. He also served as the Chief of Staff, 1st Corps in 2010 and served as an Army Student Military School Professor in 2011.

He became the Commander of the 53rd Infantry Division in 2012 and Commander of the VIII Corps in 2015, as well as became Operations Officer of the Army (G3), became Chief of Staff of the 1st Corps; and became Commander of the 2nd Operational Command in Daegu in 2018, before becoming the Chairman of the Joint Chiefs of Staff in October 2018. He formally retired in the military on September 23, 2020, after being replaced by Gen. Won In-choul.

Park is married to Chung Hee-li and they have two daughters.

Military offices
Preceded by Park Chan-ju	Commander of the 2nd Operational Command; 2017–2018	Succeeded by Hwang In-kwon
Preceded by Jeong Kyeong-doo	Chairman of the Joint Chiefs of Staff; 2018–2020	Succeeded by Won In-choul
