= Lee Seong-yong =

South Korean air force general

- 이성용

Chief of Staff of the Air Force
- In office 23 September 2020 – 4 June 2021
- Preceded by: Won In-choul

Personal details
- Born: 1964 (age 61–62)

Military service
- Allegiance: South Korea
- Branch/service: Republic of Korea Air Force

Lee Seong-yong (Korean: 이성용; born 1964) is a South Korean air force general. He served as Chief of Staff of the Air Force of the Republic of Korea Air Force from 23 September 2020 to 4 June 2021.

He stepped down after an air force master sergeant was arrested on charges of sexually harassing a female colleague. She committed suicide in May 2021.

Military offices
Preceded by Won In-choul	Chief of Staff of the Air Force; 2020–2021	Succeeded by Park In-ho
