= Chief of Staff of the Air Force (South Korea) =

Head of the Republic of Korea Air Force

Chief of Staff of the Republic of Korea Air Force (ROKAF)
- 대한민국 공군참모총장
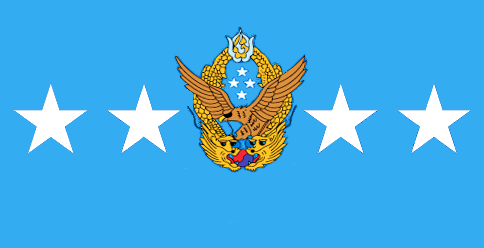
- Flag of the chief of staff of the Air Force
- Incumbent; General Son Sug Rag since 2 September 2025
- Ministry of National Defense
- Member of: Joint Chiefs of Staff
- Reports to: Chairman of the Joint Chiefs of Staff
- Appointer: The president
- Formation: 1 October 1949
- First holder: Lieutenant General Kim Chung-yul
- Deputy: Vice Chief of Staff of the Republic of Korea Air Force

The chief of staff of the Republic of Korea Air Force (Korean: 대한민국 공군참모총장, Hanja: 大韓民國空軍參謀總長), is the professional head of the Republic of Korea Air Force (ROKAF) since its foundation in 1949, originally held by a lieutenant general, then by a four-star general since 1968.

The duty of the chief of staff is to direct and supervise the Air Force (not including operation units) by order of the Minister of National Defense according to Article 10, Act on the Organization of National Armed Forces.

The appointment of the chief of staff, along with the chiefs of staff of the Army, the chief of naval operations and the chairman of the Joint Chiefs of Staff, is referred to the State Council of South Korea for deliberation according to Article 89, Constitution of South Korea.

== List ==
| No. | Portrait | Chief of Staff of the Air Force | Took office | Left office | Time in office |
|---|---|---|---|---|---|
| 1 | Kim Chung-yul | Lieutenant General; Kim Chung-yul (1917–1992) | 1 October 1949 | 14 November 1952 | 3 years, 44 days |
| 2 | Choi Yong-duk | Lieutenant General; Choi Yong-duk (1898–1969) | 1 December 1952 | 19 November 1954 | 1 year, 353 days |
| 3 | Kim Chung-yul | Lieutenant General; Kim Chung-yul (1917–1992) | 1 December 1954 | 1 December 1956 | 2 years, 0 days |
| 4 | Jang Duk-chang | Lieutenant General; Jang Duk-chang (1903–1972) | 1 December 1956 | 1 December 1958 | 2 years, 0 days |
| 5 | Kim Chang-kyu | Lieutenant General; Kim Chang-kyu (1920–2020) | 1 December 1958 | 25 July 1960 | 1 year, 237 days |
| 6 | Kim Shin | Lieutenant General; Kim Shin (1922–2016) | 1 August 1960 | 1 August 1962 | 2 years, 0 days |
| 7 | Chang Sung-hwan | Lieutenant General; Chang Sung-hwan (1920–2015) | 1 August 1962 | 1 August 1964 | 2 years, 0 days |
| 8 | Park Won-Seok | Lieutenant General; Park Won-Seok (1923–2015) | 1 August 1964 | 1 August 1966 | 2 years, 0 days |
| 9 | Chang Chi-ryang | Lieutenant General; Chang Chi-ryang (1924–2015) | 1 August 1966 | 1 August 1968 | 2 years, 0 days |
| 10 | Kim Sung-yong | General; Kim Sung-yong (1926–2002) | 1 August 1968 | 1 August 1970 | 2 years, 0 days |
| 11 | Kim Too-man | General; Kim Too-man (born 1927) | 1 August 1970 | 24 August 1971 | 1 year, 23 days |
| 12 | Ok Man-ho | General; Ok Man-ho (1927–2011) | 25 August 1971 | 1 August 1974 | 2 years, 341 days |
| 13 | Joo Young-bok | General; Joo Young-bok (1927–2005) | 1 August 1974 | 13 April 1979 | 4 years, 255 days |
| 14 | Yoon Ja-jung | General; Yoon Ja-jung (1929–2017) | 18 April 1979 | 10 March 1981 | 1 year, 326 days |
| 15 | Lee Hee-kun | General; Lee Hee-kun (born 1929) | 10 March 1981 | 5 June 1982 | 1 year, 87 days |
| 16 | Kim Sang-tae | General; Kim Sang-tae (born 1930) | 5 June 1982 | 5 June 1984 | 2 years, 0 days |
| 17 | Kim In-ki | General; Kim In-ki (1933–2013) | 5 June 1984 | 5 June 1987 | 3 years, 0 days |
| 18 | Suh Dong-yul | General; Suh Dong-yul (1931–2022) | 5 June 1987 | 5 June 1989 | 2 years, 0 days |
| 19 | Chung Yong-hoo | General; Chung Yong-hoo (1934–2004) | 5 June 1989 | 8 September 1990 | 1 year, 95 days |
| 20 | Han Chu-sok | General; Han Chu-sok (born 1936) | 8 September 1990 | 8 September 1992 | 2 years, 0 days |
| 21 | Lee Yang-ho | General; Lee Yang-ho (1937–2020) | 8 September 1992 | 27 May 1993 | 261 days |
| 22 | Cho Kun-hae | General; Cho Kun-hae (1937–1994) | 27 May 1993 | 3 March 1994 | 280 days |
| 23 | Kim Hong-rae | General; Kim Hong-rae (1939–2022) | 8 March 1994 | 8 March 1996 | 2 years, 0 days |
| 24 | Lee Kwang-hak | General; Lee Kwang-hak (born 1939) | 8 March 1996 | 6 March 1998 | 1 year, 363 days |
| 25 | Park Chun-taek | General; Park Chun-taek (born 1939) | 6 March 1998 | 3 March 2000 | 1 year, 363 days |
| 26 | Lee Eok-soo | General; Lee Eok-soo (born 1943) | 3 March 2000 | 2 March 2002 | 1 year, 364 days |
| 27 | Kim Dae-wook | General; Kim Dae-wook (1944–2007) | 2 March 2002 | 11 October 2003 | 1 year, 223 days |
| 28 | Lee Han-ho | General; Lee Han-ho (born 1946) | 11 October 2003 | 7 October 2005 | 1 year, 361 days |
| 29 | Kim Sung-il | General; Kim Sung-il (born 1948) | 10 October 2005 | 13 April 2007 | 1 year, 185 days |
| 30 | Kim Eun-ki | General; Kim Eun-ki (born 1952) | 13 April 2007 | 2 October 2008 | 1 year, 172 days |
| 31 | Lee Gye-hoon | General; Lee Gye-hoon (born 1952) | 2 October 2008 | 30 September 2010 | 1 year, 363 days |
| 32 | Park Jong-heon | General; Park Jong-heon (born 1954) | 30 September 2010 | 18 April 2012 | 1 year, 201 days |
| 33 | Sung Il-hwan | General; Sung Il-hwan (born 1954) | 18 April 2012 | 11 April 2014 | 1 year, 358 days |
| 34 | Choi Cha-kyu | General; Choi Cha-kyu (born 1956) | 11 April 2014 | 17 September 2015 | 1 year, 159 days |
| 35 | Jeong Kyeong-doo | General; Jeong Kyeong-doo (born 1960) | 17 September 2015 | 11 August 2017 | 1 year, 328 days |
| 36 | Lee Wang-keun | General; Lee Wang-keun (born 1961) | 11 August 2017 | 16 April 2019 | 1 year, 248 days |
| 37 | Won In-choul | General; Won In-choul (born 1961) | 16 April 2019 | 23 September 2020 | 1 year, 160 days |
| 38 | Lee Seong-yong | General; Lee Seong-yong (born 1964) | 23 September 2020 | 10 June 2021 | 260 days |
| 39 | Park In-ho | General; Park In-ho (born 1964) | 2 July 2021 | 27 May 2022 | 329 days |
| 40 | Jung Sang-hwa | General; Jung Sang-hwa (born 1964) | 27 May 2022 | 31 October 2023 | 1 year, 157 days |
| 41 | Lee Young-su | General; Lee Young-su (born 1967) | 31 October 2023 | 2 September 2025 | 2 years, 355 days |
