= Kim Sung-il (general) =

South Korean military commander

- Born: August 24, 1948 (age 77); Chinhae, South Korea
- Occupation: Military general
- Military career
- Allegiance: South Korea
- Branch: ROK Air Force

- Kim Sung-il
- Hangul: 김성일
- Hanja: 金成一
- RR: Gim Seongil
- MR: Kim Sŏngil

Kim Sung-il (Korean: 김성일) is a former Chief of Staff of the Republic of Korea Air Force.

== Early life and education ==
He was born on August 24, 1948, and attended the Korea Air Force Academy and Korea National Defense University. He served as commander of the 11th Wing and the Aerospace Project Group, and later became the Director of Korea Defense Intelligence Agency, a position traditionally held by Army generals.

== Career ==
He was appointed to a two-year term as Chief of Staff of ROKAF in October 2005. He resigned in March 2007 after a KF-16 fighter jet crashed due to maintenance failures. He was also facing criticism for having played golf during a national day of mourning for Yoon Jang-ho, a soldier who was killed in Afghanistan.
