= Lee Hyun-jae =

Prime Minister of South Korea in 1988

His Excellency Lee Hyun-jae
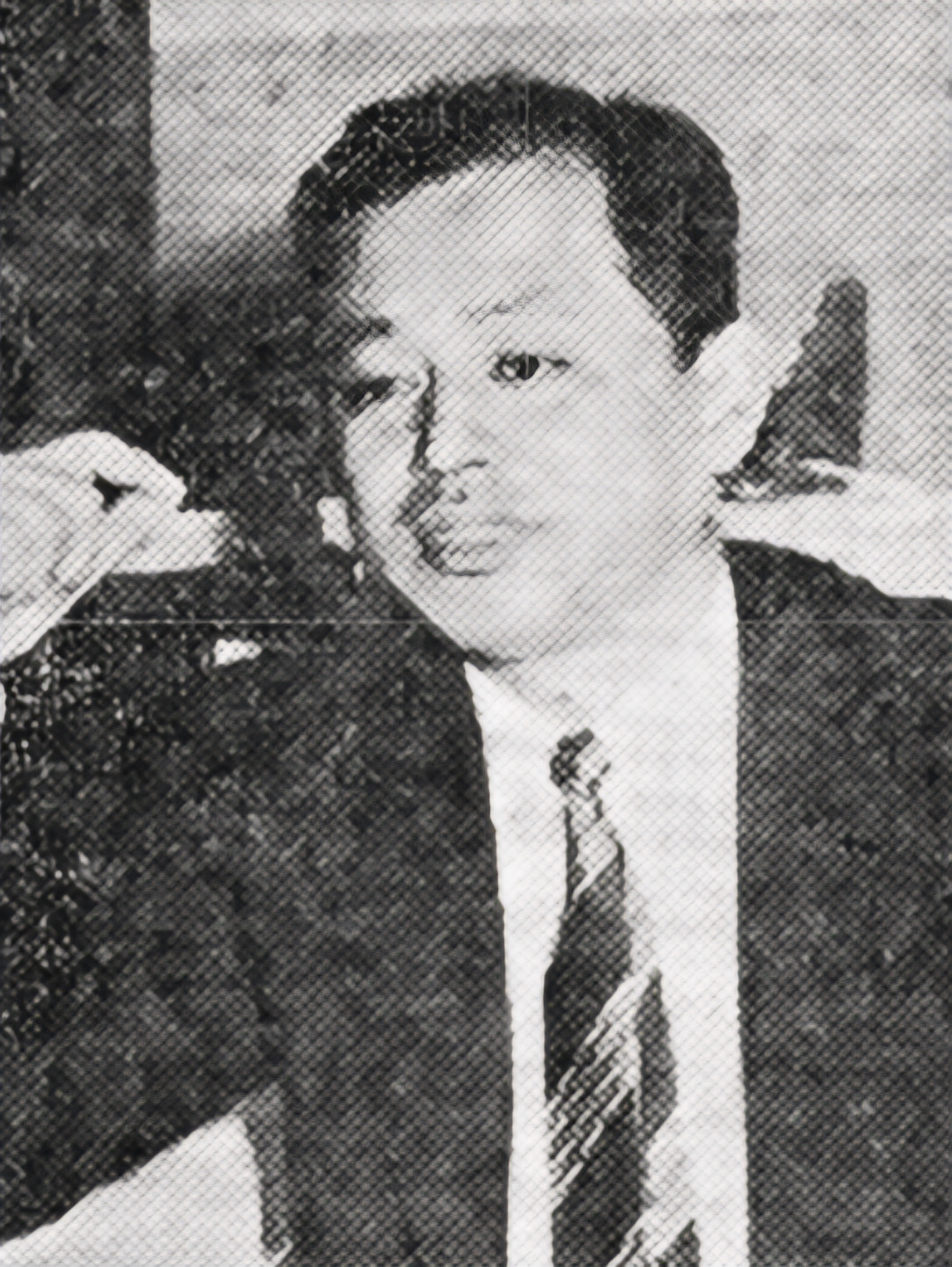
- Lee in 1970

20th Prime Minister of South Korea
- In office 25 February 1988 – 1 March 1988 (acting)
- President: Roh Tae-woo
- Deputy: Rha Woong-bae
- Preceded by: Kim Chung-yul
- Succeeded by: Himself
- In office 3 March 1988 – 4 December 1988
- President: Roh Tae-woo
- Deputy: Rha Woong-bae
- Preceded by: Himself
- Succeeded by: Kang Young-hoon

Personal details
- Born: 20 December 1929 (age 96) Hongseong, Chūseinan Province, Korea, Empire of Japan
- Education: Seoul National University

Korean name
- Hangul: 이현재
- Hanja: 李賢宰
- RR: I Hyeonjae
- MR: I Hyŏnjae

Lee Hyun-jae (Korean: 이현재; born 20 December 1929) is a South Korean former politician who served as the prime minister of South Korea from March to December 1988. He is the chairman of the Ho-Am Prize Committee and an advisor of the Korean Association for Cultural Economics.

Political offices
| Preceded by Kim Chung-yul | Prime Minister of South Korea; March 2, 1988–December 4, 1988 | Succeeded by Kang Young-hoon |
