= Suh Wook =

South Korean army general (born 1963)

- 서욱
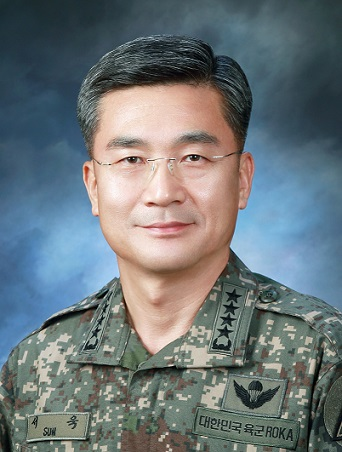
- Suh as Army general

Minister of National Defense
- In office 18 September 2020 – 10 May 2022
- President: Moon Jae-in
- Preceded by: Jeong Kyeong-doo
- Succeeded by: Lee Jong-sup

Chief of Staff of the Army
- In office 16 April 2019 – 18 September 2020
- President: Moon Jae-in
- Preceded by: Kim Yong-woo
- Succeeded by: Nam Yeong-shin

Personal details
- Born: 12 May 1963 (age 63) Gwangju, South Korea
- Education: Korea Military Academy

Military service
- Allegiance: South Korea
- Branch/service: Republic of Korea Army
- Years of service: 1985–2020
- Rank: General

Suh Wook (Korean: 서욱; Hanja: 徐旭; 12 May 1963), also known as Seo Wook, is a former Minister of National Defense who served under President Moon Jae-in from 2020 to 2022. He is President Moon's first defense minister with an Army background, as his predecessors came from other branches of the Armed Forces.

Upon the beginning of Moon's presidency in 2017, he was reshuffled to Joint Chiefs of Staff where he served as its chief director of operation before promoted as Chief of Army Staff in 2019.

From 2011 to 2014 Suh served at ROK-US Combined Forces Command. He then served as commanding general of the First Corps from 2016 to 2017.

Suh is a Korea Military Academy graduate and holds two degrees - a master's in military strategy from the Korea National Defense University and a doctorate in political science from Kyungnam University.

Suh was arrested on October 22, 2022, due to covering up facts in the killing of Lee Dae-jun, a South Korean fisheries official who was killed by North Korean soldiers. The Democratic Party of Korea claims the arrest of Suh and Kim Hong-hee who was the Coast Guard chief, are believed to be politically motivated charges. However the government says that there was evidence that the incident was mishandled by officials at the time. Some sources say that the two may have also abused power during the incident. Suh was acquitted in December 2025.

== Effective dates of promotion ==
Promotions
| Insignia | Rank | Year |
|---|---|---|
| | General | 2019 |
| | Lieutenant General | 2016 |
| | Major General | 2014 |
| | Brigadier General | 2010 |

Military offices
| Preceded by Kim Yong-woo | Chief of Staff of the Army; 2019–2020 | Succeeded by Nam Yeong-shin |
Political offices
| Preceded by Jeong Kyeong-doo | Minister of National Defense; 2020–2022 | Succeeded by Lee Jong-sup |
