= Waddington International Airshow =

Former British airshow held at RAF Waddington

- Status: defunct
- Genre: airshow
- Dates: July
- Frequency: annual
- Venue: RAF Waddington
- Country: United Kingdom
- Established: 1995
- Attendance: 140,000

The Waddington International Airshow was an airshow which took place annually at RAF Waddington in Lincolnshire, England, between 1995 and 2014.

== Inauguration in 1995 ==
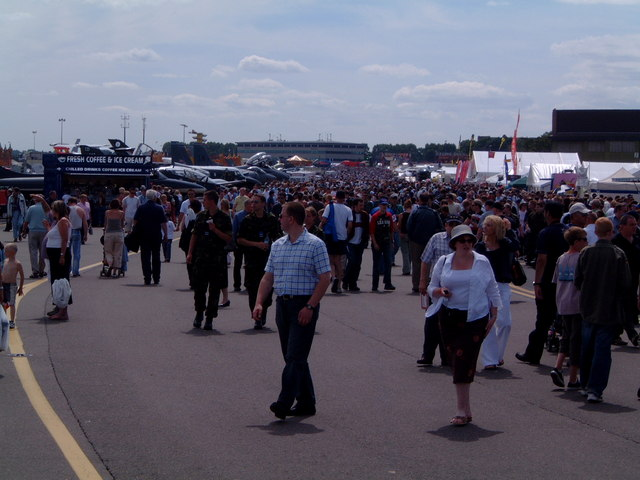
Waddington Airshow in 2002 with the Air Warfare Centre in the distance.

The first RAF Waddington International Airshow was staged at RAF Waddington in 1995, after the event was moved south from RAF Finningley; a now former Royal Air Force (RAF) station located east of Doncaster (now known as Robin Hood Airport Doncaster Sheffield) which was closed in 1995. Over the following years, the RAF Waddington International Airshow developed into the largest of all RAF airshows. It took place on the first weekend in July, attracting over 140,000 visitors and representatives of air forces from all round the world. The main purpose of the show was to raise public awareness and understanding of the Royal Air Force, and its role today. Eighty five percent (85%) of all proceeds from the event were distributed to the two main Service charities; the RAF Benevolent Fund (RAFBF) and the RAF Association (RAFA); the remaining 15% donated to local worthy causes. Since the inaugural year 1995, the Airshow has raised almost £3 million for Service and local charities.

== 2010 ==
The 2010 Airshow took place over the weekend of 3 and 4 July. The main themes being 90 years since the first ever RAF airshow, at RAF Hendon, 70th anniversary of the Battle of Britain and 35 years of Airborne Early Warning. The flying display included Vulcan XH558, many regular exhibitors and aircraft but also display teams that had never been to Waddington before, including the Turkish Stars, the Czech Saab JAS 39 Gripen and Aero L-159 ALCA display.

== 2011 ==
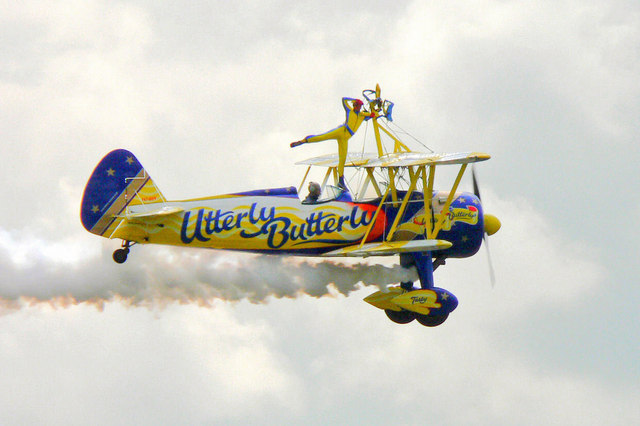
Wing walking on a Boeing-Stearman Model 75 in July 2005.

The 2011 Airshow took place on 2 and 3 July, with the theme of Air Power - Past, Present and Future. Several indoor and outdoor exhibitions reflected this theme, including a new audio-visual experience in the main exhibition hangar. Visitors learned about the RAF's current operations abroad, the RAF's equipment and the RAF's personnel, devoted to their roles within the RAF. The USAF Display Team, The Thunderbirds, also took part. Displays included the Red Arrows, Team Viper, Belgian F-16 solo, Avro Vulcan XH558 and the Royal Jordanian Falcons as well as many others.

Ground displays included over 100 aircraft, 250 trade stands, two exhibition hangars and the Military Village concept where all services display, the Waddington SERE (Survive, Evade, Resist, Extract) School display with its close RNLI association. Many clubs also featured in the Village demonstrating the diversity of hobbies and interests available to RAF personnel today.

== 2012 ==
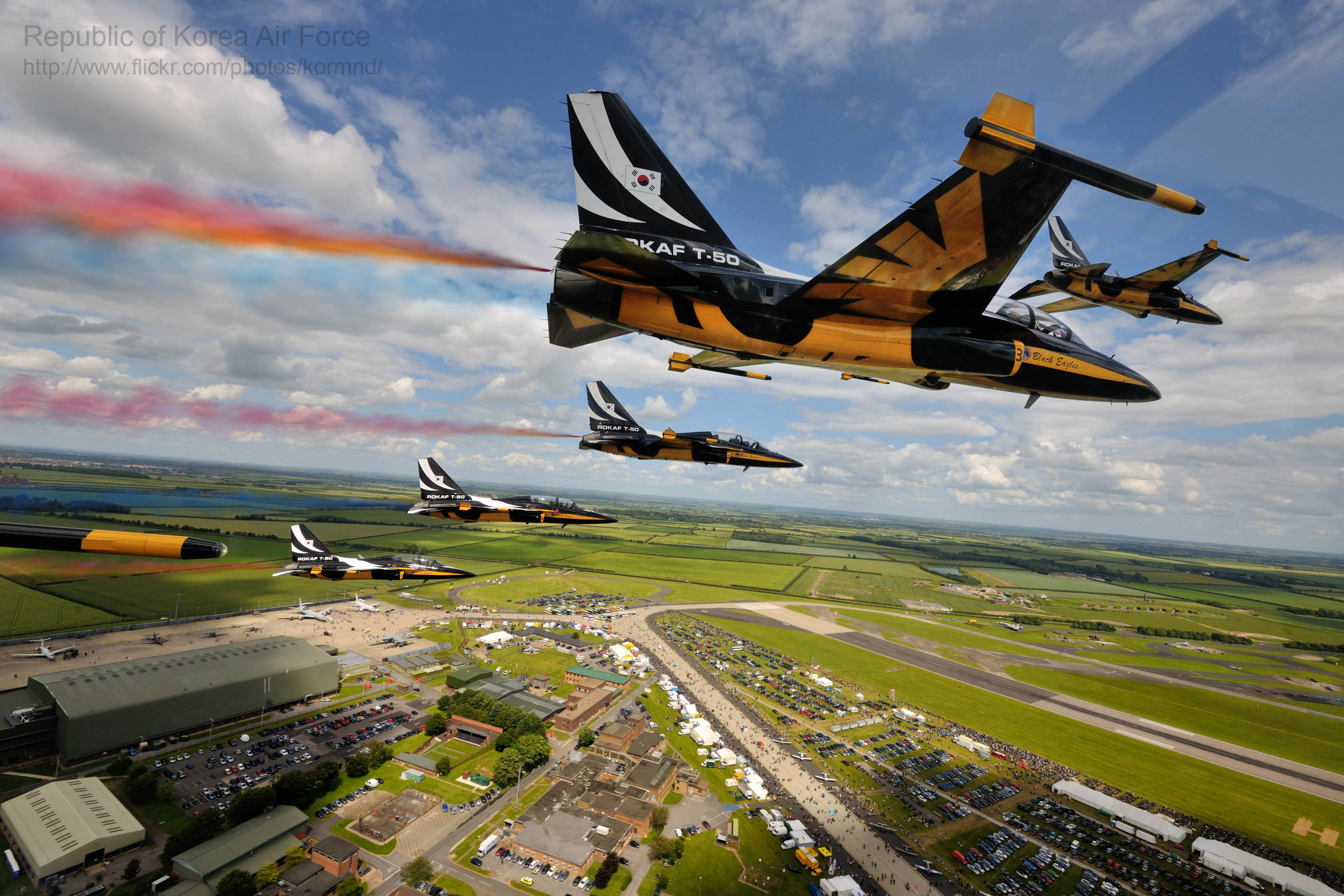
Republic of Korea Black Eagles participating the 2012 Waddington International Airshow.

The 2012 (30 June/ 1 July 2012) airshow attracted over 130,000 visitors to RAF Waddington from across the UK and beyond. Celebrating 100 years of the Central Flying School, Combat ISTAR and the Year of Lincolnshire Aviation the airshow had over 210 aircraft on display. Twenty countries took part in the event, with the first appearance in the UK by a RAAF Boeing Wedgetail and the debut appearance in Europe by the Republic of Korea Black Eagles display team. The team took the best flying display award.

== 2013 ==
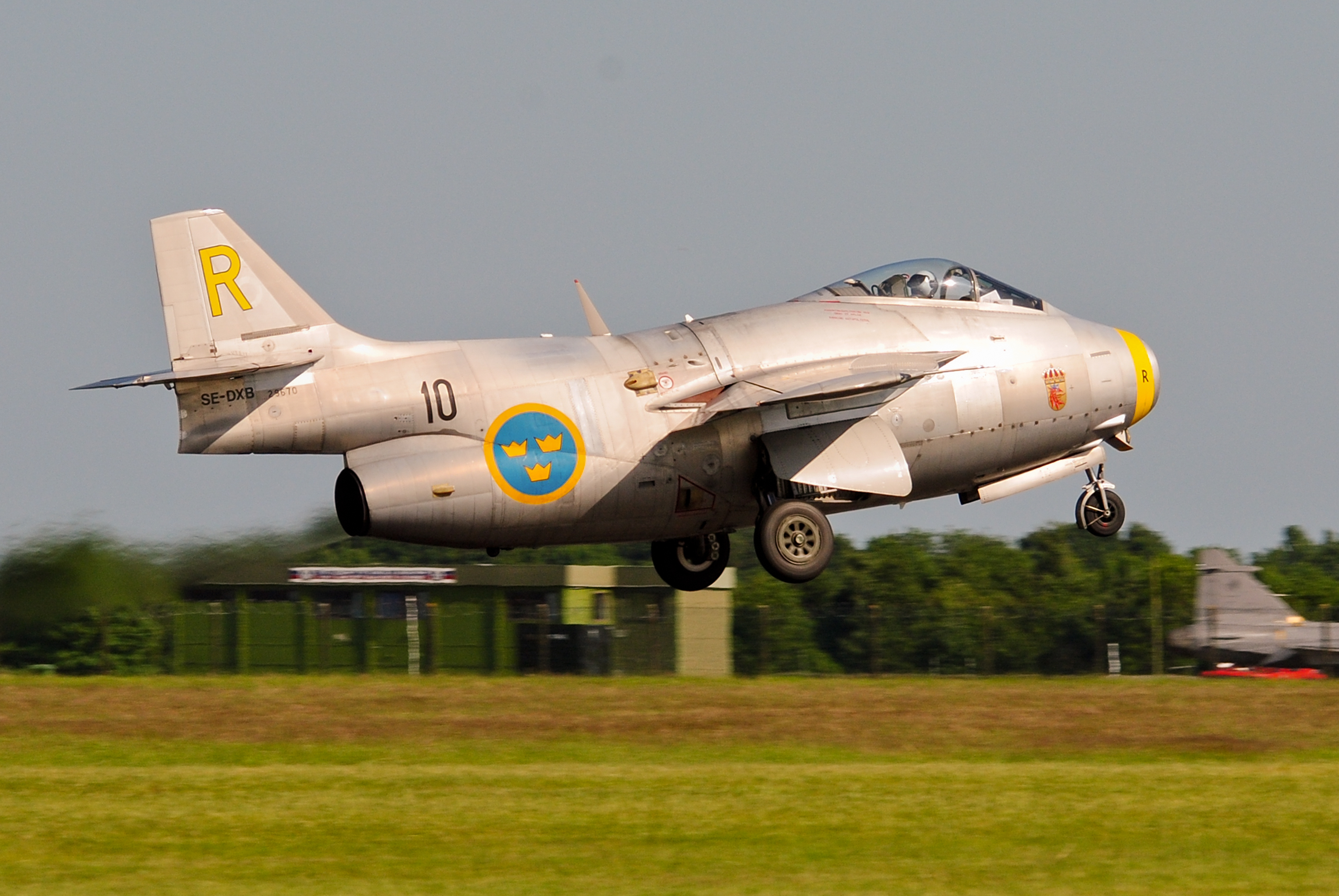
Saab J-29 Tunnan, Swedish Air Force. RAF Waddington Airshow 2013.

The 2013 airshow was held over 6 and 7 July 2013 at RAF Waddington and celebrated the 95th Anniversary of the Royal Air Force. The airshow also commemorated 70yrs since the historic and daring raids on the German dams of WWII, the 100th Anniversary of RAF Waddington's own 5(AC) Squadron and looked into the secretive world of ISTAR. Over 150,000 visitors attended the show in 2013, making it the biggest and best attended military airshow in the UK. The show featured the only display in the UK by the Turkish Air Forces Solo Türk F-16 demo as well as participation from the Netherlands, Belgium, Poland, France, Italy, Jordan, Czech Republic and many more. The show also featured the Saab 37 Viggen.

== 2014 ==
The RAF Waddington Airshow of 2014 was also widely regarded as a success. Crowds in excess of 135,000 flocked to the base over the two days of the show helping to generate a sum of £260,000 which was in turn donated to Service and local charities. However 2014 was to prove to be the last time an airshow would be staged at RAF Waddington.

== End of show ==
During 2015 RAF Waddington was earmarked for development, a significant part of which being concerned with the station's runway with work scheduled for 59 weeks. This therefore ruled out an airshow during 2015.

The timing of the works coincided with a review of the base in general, the continuance of the airshow being also part of the review. The outcome was that having weighed up the content of the report, it was decided that: "significant security risks as well as certain operational risks" resulted from the operation of the RAF Waddington Airshow, and therefore the airshow, for the reasons cited, would not be continued with. These security risks have generally centred around RAF Waddington being used as a base for the operation of Reaper drones.

There was strong public objection to the decision regarding the event. A petition numbering 4,262 signatories was gathered with local politicians also campaigning for the retention of the airshow.

In February 2016 it was announced that following an agreement between the Royal Air Force and the Royal Air Force Charitable Trust, the venue of the airshow would switch from RAF Waddington to RAF Scampton, with the hope that the airshow would be resurrected in 2017.
