= Black Eagles aerobatic team =

53rd Air Demonstration Group "Black Eagles"
- Black Eagles Aerobatic Team seal
- Active: 238th Fighter Squadron (1967–1999); 239th Special Squadron (1999–2007); 53rd Air Demonstration Group (2009–present)
- Country: Republic of Korea
- Branch: Republic of Korea Air Force
- Type: Aerobatics
- Role: Aerobatic maneuver
- Size: 8 planes
- Part of: Republic of Korea Air force headquarters
- Garrison/HQ: Wonju AB, Gangwon province
- Motto: 팀워크 (EN : Team Work)
- Colors: Black, Yellowstone, White

Commanders
- Current commander: Col. Lee Chang-yong

Aircraft flown
- Attack: Cessna A-37B (1994–2007)
- Fighter: Northrop F-5A (1967–1994)
- Trainer: KAI T-50B (2009–present)

The 53rd Air Demonstration Group, nicknamed the Black Eagles, is the flight display team of the Republic of Korea Air Force (ROKAF) based at Wonju, Gangwon Province.

The ROKAF Aerobatic Team has operated on various occasions at national ceremonies. The permanent team was initially formed on December 12, 1994, and flew six Cessna A-37B Dragonfly airplanes. The team disbanded temporarily after the 2007 Seoul Air Show and reformed upon the arrival of their new T-50 Golden Eagle aircraft code-named as T-50B in 2010.

== History ==
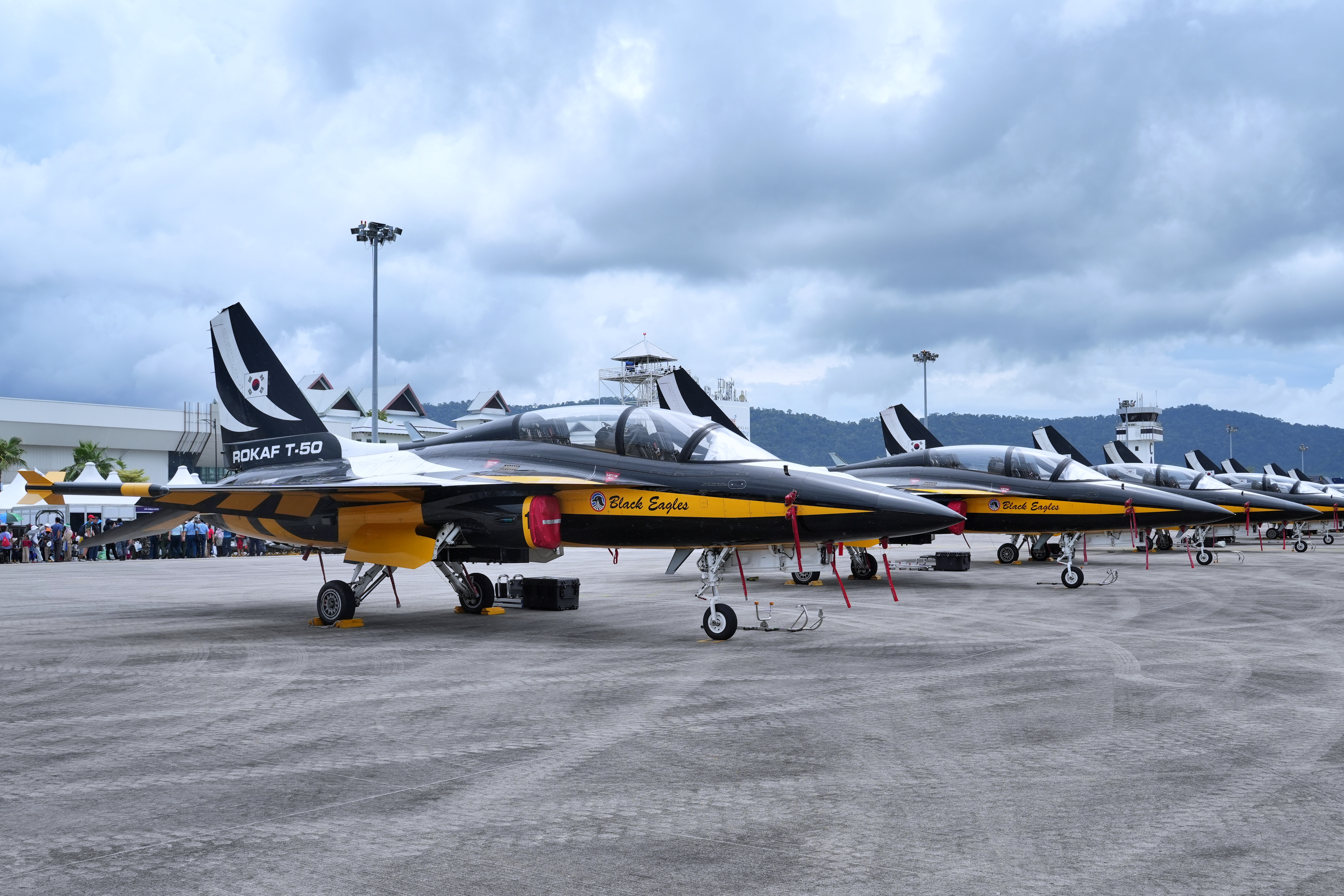
Black Eagles aerobatic team in Langkawi, Malaysia, 2023

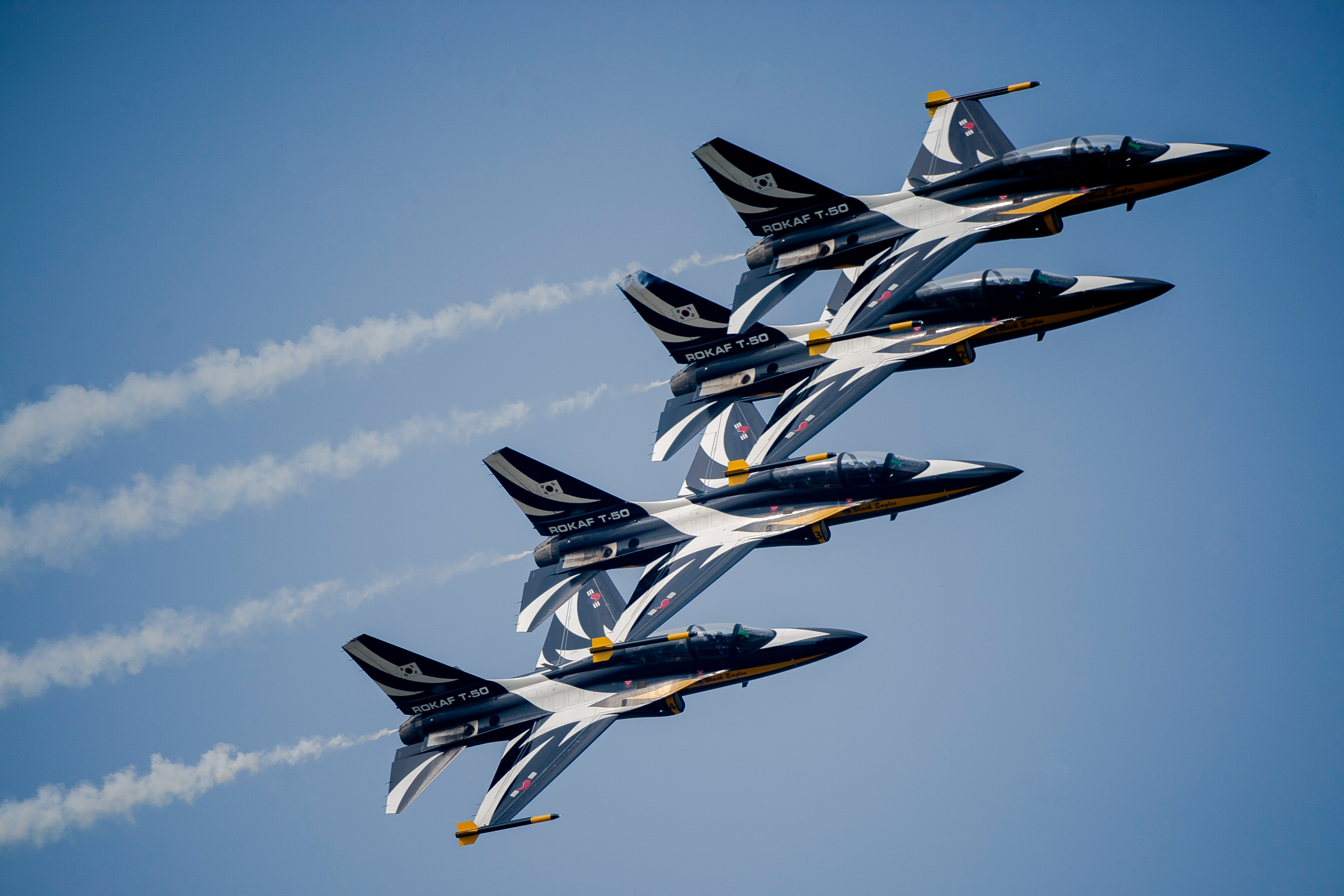
The Black Eagles performing during Air Power Day 2016 over Osan Air Base.

The Republic of Korea Air Force Black Eagles aerobatic team has operated in various occasions at national ceremonies and at international air shows.

The original display team was formed on October 1, 1953, and operated four P-51 Mustangs. In October 1956 a new display team, the T-33A Show Flight Team was formed.

On October 1, 1959, a new display team was formed. This team was called the Blue Sabre and they flew four F-86 Sabre jet airplanes. This team was disbanded in 1966.

In 1967, a new display team, the Black Eagles, was formed. It operated between 1966 through 1978 and flew seven Northrop F-5A Freedom Fighters. From 1966 to 1969 the aircraft were F-5As. Flying was suspended from 1970 to 1972, and from 1973 to 1978 the aircraft used were RF-5As. In 1978 the team was disbanded in order to enhance defense preparedness.

The full-time aerobatic team, the Black Eagles, was re-established as the 2nd flight of the 238th Fighter Squadron, the 8th Fighter Wing on December 12, 1994, and flew six Cessna A-37B Dragonfly airplanes. On April 1, 1999, the flight was detached from the 238 FS and became the 239th Aerobatic Flight Squadron.

After the Seoul Air Show in 2007, the Black Eagles team was temporarily disbanded on October 31, 2007, for transitioning to their new T-50 Golden Eagle. The farewell flight mission was directed by General Kim Eun-gi, ROKAF Chief of Staff on October 10, 2007.

The reformation was scheduled for 2010, but ahead of schedule, the Black Eagles were re-established in August 2009 and performed an air show to fly over Seoul on September 23, 2009, to commemorate the ROKAF's 60th anniversary.

On July 1, 2012, the Black Eagles was awarded the Boeing Trophy for best display at the 17th Waddington International Airshow.

On July 8, 2012, the Black Eagles were awarded the King Hussein Memorial Sword, for Best Overall Flying Demonstration and As The Crow Flies Trophy at the awards ceremony of the Royal International Air Tattoo, on their first appearance at the airshow.

On April 1, 2013, the squadron was authorized to expand to an independent group level, the 53rd Air Demonstration Group, including the 239th squadron and its dedicated maintenance flights, was established under the direct control of the ROKAF Headquarters. Now the Black Eagles are not commanded by the 8th Fighter Wing, but the group is still based at Wonju alongside its ex-parent unit and supported by the wing's logistics and support units.

=== T-50 characteristics ===
The Black Eagles' KAI T-50B is painted in yellow, white, and black. It is equipped with an internal smoke generation system which creates a thick smoke trail. The aircraft is the same as the original T-50 except for the smoke generation system, several cameras, and two wingtip visible lights.

=== Smoke ===
The thick smoke trails of the Black Eagles aerobatic team are made by releasing diesel and oil into the exhaust nozzle; this mixture immediately oxidizes, leaving a white smoke trail. There are two smoke tanks in the aircraft, each designed to carry about 60 gallons of smoke oil. The smoke system can control the quantity of oil released, so each aircraft can trail smoke for seven to twenty minutes.

== Maneuver ==
The Black Eagles group demonstrates organized teamwork and sophisticated flight skills. The display is composed of about 30 aerobatic maneuvers. The team has a total of eight aircraft in formation. Formations with 4~8 aircraft usually show grandeur and sophistication at the same time. One to four plane maneuvers show thrills and excitement. During an aerobatics display, pilots experience forces up to 4 to 5 g's, and when performing the aerobatic maneuver 'Maximum maneuver', forces up to 9 g (the structural limit of the aircraft).

=== 2020 Full / High Show Sequence ===
1. Change Loop: Big Arrow to Penta, to Canard after the loop, then commence loop again from right side, they will form the Star formation this time.
2. Change Turn: Diamond to Albatross to Eagle to Big Arrow while the 360° Oblique Turn.
3. Victory Roll: 8-Ship Formation Barrel Roll
4. Bon Ton Roulle: Maintaining the spread form of Penta, 8-ship will perform aileron roll simultaneously.
5. Rainfall: 8 ships clover-leaf then separate to 8 ways from center.
6. Scissor Pass: 4 ships
7. Vortex : 4 ships
8. Double Cross Turn: 2 ships
9. Goose: 6 ships
10. Heart and Cupid: 3 ships
11. Orchid: 5 ships
12. 2 ships High and Loop: 3 ships
13. Roll Back and Afterburner Loop: 5 ships
14. Taegeuk (태극): 2 ships (the national flag of South Korea)
15. Cloverleaf / Cross: 6 ships
16. Rock & roll : 2 ships
17. Inverted Bottom Up Pass: 2 ships
18. Echelon Review: 4 ships
19. Double Helix: 4 ships
20. Eagle Snatch: 4 ships
21. Dizzying Break: 4 ships
22. Twist Roll: 4 ships
23. Maximum Maneuver: 1 ship
24. Victory Break: 7 ships
25. Tornado Landing: 8 ships

== Accidents ==
- On May 8, 1998, during a training flight, two of the team's planes collided in mid-air. One of the planes crashed killing the team leader of the Black Eagles. The other plane landed with minor damage.
- On May 5, 2006, at the Suwon Air Base, an A-37B crashed onto the far edge of the runway during an air show that was intended to celebrate Children's Day. Crowds ranging in the thousands, including many children, witnessed the crash.
- On November 15, 2012, a South Korean air force pilot from the service's Black Eagles aerobatic display team was killed when his KAI T-50B trainer crashed in a mountainside in the area of Hoengseong, about 48 nm (90 km) east of Seoul, due to human error during a maintenance operation.
- On February 6, 2018, one of the team's planes flipped over after one of its tires burst on takeoff at Changi Airport. It was taking off in preparation for a display at the Singapore Airshow.

== See also ==
- List of airshow accidents
