= Kim Seung-kyum =

South Korean army general

- 김승겸
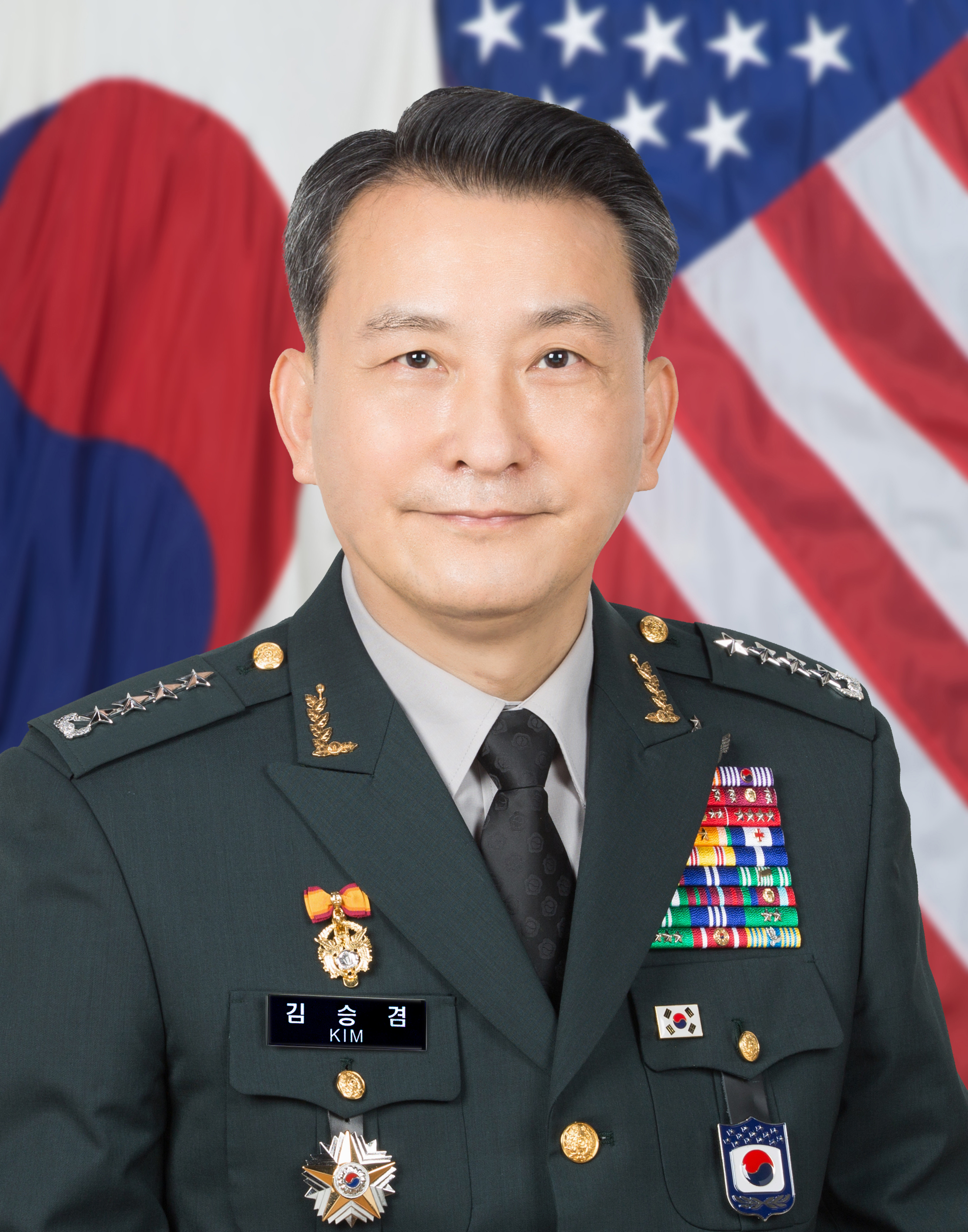

Chairman of the Joint Chiefs of Staff
- In office 5 July 2022 – 25 November 2023
- President: Yoon Suk Yeol
- Preceded by: Won In-choul
- Succeeded by: Kim Myung-soo

Personal details
- Born: 12 April 1963 (age 63) Seocheon, South Chungcheong Province, South Korea
- Education: Korea Military Academy
- Occupation: Military officer
- Awards: Eulji Order of Military Merit

Military service
- Allegiance: South Korea
- Branch/service: Republic of Korea Army
- Years of service: 1982–2023
- Rank: General
- Commands: Chairman of the Joint Chiefs of Staff; Deputy Commander of ROK-US Combined Forces Command; III Corps
- Battles/wars: Korean Conflict

Korean name
- Hangul: 김승겸
- Hanja: 金承謙
- RR: Gim Seunggyeom
- MR: Kim Sŭnggyŏm

Kim Seung-kyum (Korean: 김승겸; born April 12, 1963), is a South Korean Army general who previously served as the Chairman of the Joint Chiefs of Staff (JCS) from July 5, 2022, to November 25, 2023. Prior to becoming JCS chairman, Kim was the ROK-US Combined Forces Command deputy commander.

== Early life and education ==
Kim Seung-kyum was born on April 12, 1963, in Seocheon, South Chungcheong Province, to a military family. His father was a lieutenant colonel in the reserves. He graduated from Osan High School, in Seoul. He entered the Korea Military Academy in 1982 and graduated in the class of 1986.

== Military career ==
After graduating at the Korea Military Academy in 1986, Kim was commissioned as a second lieutenant, he has served in various key military posts, including the vice Army chief of staff and the head of the 3rd Corps.

His service led to his promotion to the rank of captain in 1987. He served as an infantry officer in the 3rd Infantry Division. In 1992, his unit responded to a North Korean border incursion near Cheorwon, killing two North Korean intruders. For his role as the company commander, Captain Kim was awarded the Eulji Order of Military Merit. In 1994, Kim achieved the rank of major within the 3rd Infantry Division. In 2006, he received a promotion to the rank of lieutenant colonel. In 2008, he further advanced in rank to colonel. Kim had risen to the rank of brigadier general in 2012. In 2015, he was promoted to major general. He was later promoted to lieutenant general in 2017. In 2021, he received a last promotion to the rank of four-star general.

=== Chairman of the Joint Chiefs of Staff ===
On 25 May 2022, he was named as the next chief of the Joint Chiefs of Staff (JCS). Kim was replaced by General Ahn Byung-Seok in Kim's role as the Deputy Commander of ROK/US Combined Forces Command. On 5 July 2022, Kim became the Chairman of the Joint Chiefs of Staff, replacing Air Force General Won In-choul.

On 2 March 2023, South Korean top military general Kim Seung-kyum vowed to establish a wartime combined operations posture against rising threats from North Korea, local media reported on Thursday. Inspecting the combined special operations drills between the US and South Korean militaries, Joint Chiefs of Staff (JCS) Chairman Gen. Kim called on the troops to maintain their capabilities to "strike the enemy's critical facilities without fail," Yonhap News Agency reported, quoting a statement from his office. “Kim stressed the importance of harnessing the capability to strike the enemy's critical facilities without fail, and establishing a wartime combined operations posture by enhancing interoperability between the allies through realistic combined special operations training,” the agency quoted JCS as saying. Kim also spoke about rising threats from North Korea and called on his troops to always prepare to inflict critical damage on the enemy, it said. Kim on Monday inspected joint military drills by South Korea and US special commandos involving AC-130J and MC-130J warplanes. The US had also deployed AC-130J, a heavily armed, long-endurance, ground-attack plane for the first time to Korea. Tensions on Korean Peninsula escalated late last year when North Korea launched at least 60 missiles while South Korea and the US held joint military exercises.

== Effective dates of promotion ==
Promotions
Insignia	Rank	Year
	General	2020.09.
	Lieutenant General	2017.09.
	Major General	2014.09.
	Brigadier General	2013.01.
	Colonel	2008.12.
	Lieutenant Colonel	2002
	Major	1995
	Captain	1989
	First lieutenant	1987.03.
	Second lieutenant	1986.03.

== Awards ==
Eulji Order of Military Merit (1994)

Military offices
Preceded by Won In-choul	Chairman of the Joint Chiefs of Staff; 2022–2023	Succeeded by Kim Myung-soo
