= Lee Young-su =

South Korean Air Force general

- 이영수
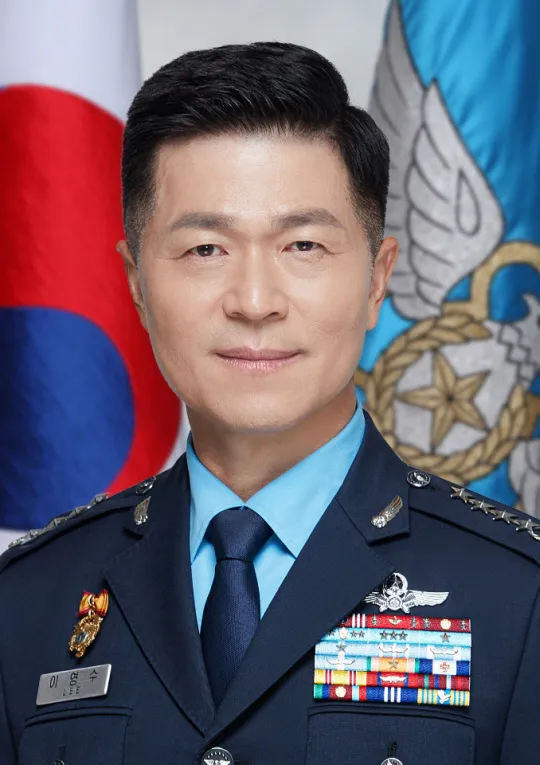

Chief of Staff of the Air Force
- Incumbent
- Assumed office 31 October 2023
- President: Yoon Suk Yeol; Han Duck-soo (acting); Choi Sang-mok (acting)
- Preceded by: Jung Sang-hwa

Personal details
- Born: 1967 (age 58–59) Haman County, South Gyeongsang Province, South Korea
- Education: Korea Air Force Academy

Military service
- Allegiance: South Korea
- Branch/service: Republic of Korea Air Force
- Years of service: 1990-Present
- Rank: General
- Commands: Chief of Staff of the Air Force

Lee Young-soo (Korean: 이영수; born 1967), is a South Korean Air Force general who has been serving as Chief of Staff of the Air Force since 31 October 2023.

== Biography ==
Lee was born in 1967 in Haman, South Gyeongsang Province. He graduated from Masan High School. He attended the Korea Air Force Academy and graduated as the 38th class in 1990. In 2005, he was one of the first pilots of the newly introduced F-15K, flying it from Guam to South Korea. He was a Lieutenant General serving as the Chief Directorate of Strategic Planning of the Joint Chiefs of Staff prior to his promotion as Chief of Staff of the Air Force. In October 2023, he was appointed as the Chief of Staff of the Air Force.

Military offices
Preceded by Jung Sang-hwa	Chief of Staff of the Air Force; 2023–Present	Incumbent
