= Hannam University =

Private Christian university in Daejeon, South Korea

Coordinates: 36.3545°N 127.4212°E

- 한남대학교
- Hannam University logo
- Former names: Daejeon University; Soongjeon University
- Type: Private Christian university
- Established: 1956
- Religious affiliation: Presbyterian Church of Korea (TongHap) (The Univ has a Partnership with PCUSA, a partner denomination of PCK)
- Academic affiliations: Association of Christian Universities and Colleges in Asia; Association of Presbyterian Colleges and Universities
- President: Seung-Cheol Yi
- Academic staff: 973
- Total staff: 1,209
- Students: 11,615
- Undergraduates: 10,853
- Postgraduates: 1,032
- Location: 70 Hannam-ro, Daedeok District, Daejeon, 34430, South Korea
- Campus: Urban
- Website: www.hannam.ac.kr

Hannam University (Korean: 한남대학교) is a private Christian university in Daejeon, South Korea. It was founded in 1956 as Daejeon University by American missionaries from the Presbyterian Church (USA). The American missionary and Korean independence activist William Alderman Linton was named the university's first president in 1959. It was renamed Soongjeon University in 1971 and received its current name in 1982.

== Notable alumni ==
- Hwang Ki-chul
- Jeong Kyeong-doo
- Shon Jin-hwan
- Won In-choul
- Kwon Sang-woo
