= Won In-choul =

South Korean air force general

- 원인철
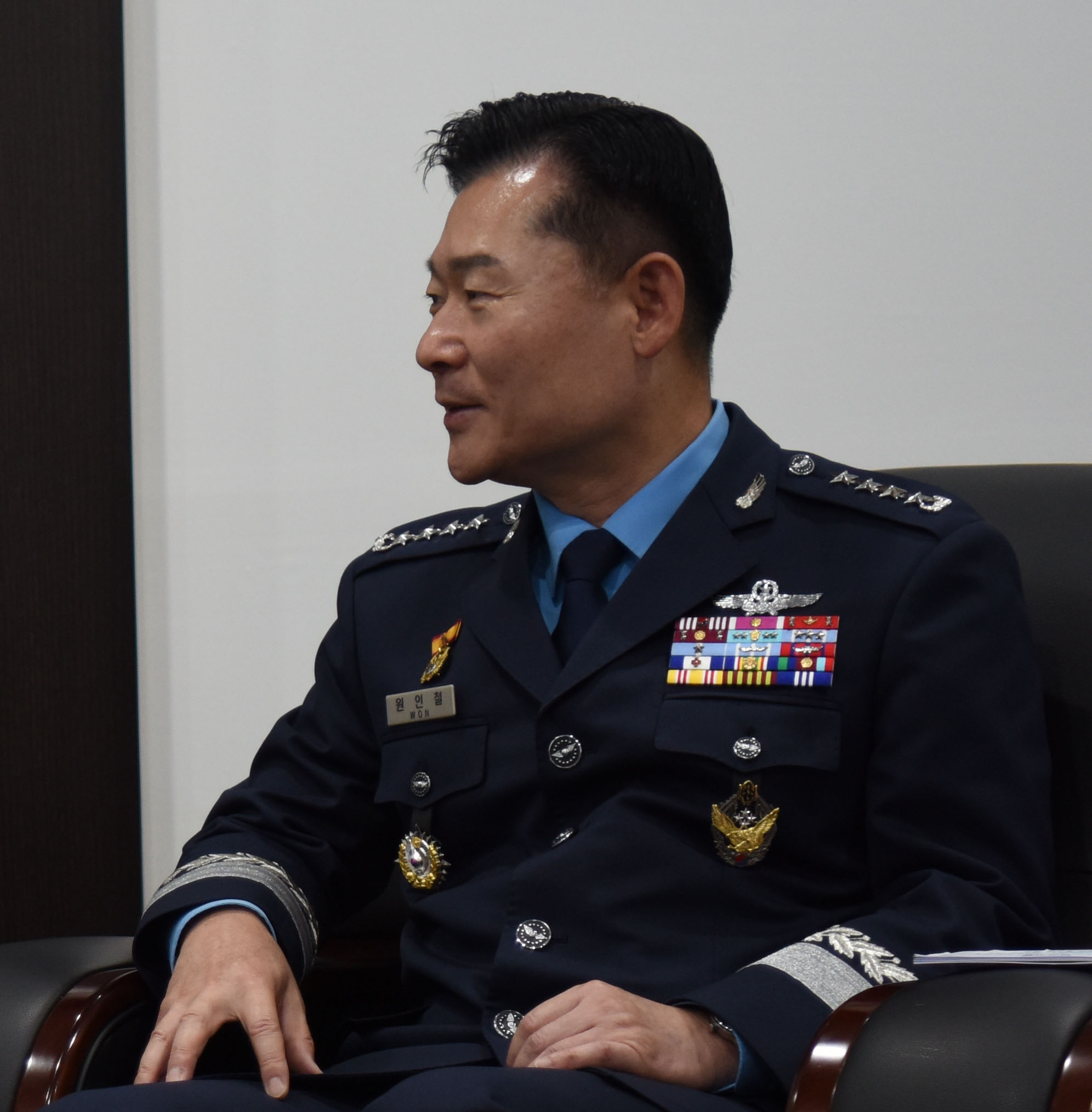

Chairman of the Joint Chiefs of Staff
- In office 23 September 2020 – 5 July 2022
- President: Moon Jae-in; Yoon Suk-yeol
- Preceded by: Park Han-ki
- Succeeded by: Kim Seung-kyum

Chief of Staff of Air Force
- In office 16 April 2019 – 23 September 2020
- President: Moon Jae-in
- Preceded by: Lee Wang-geun
- Succeeded by: Lee Seong-yong

Personal details
- Born: 1 January 1961 (age 65) Wonju, South Korea
- Education: Korea Air Force Academy; Hannam University

Military service
- Allegiance: South Korea
- Branch/service: Republic of Korea Air Force
- Years of service: 1984-2022
- Rank: General
- Unit: Chairman of the Joint Chiefs of Staff; Chief of Staff of the Air Force; Vice Chairman of the Joint Chiefs of Staff; Chief Director for Military Support; Air Force Operations Command; Vice Chief of Staff of the Air Force; Director for Exercise & Training, J37, JCS; 19th Fighter Wing; Director, Korea Air & Space Operations Center, AFOC

Won In-choul (Korean: 원인철; Hanja: 元仁哲; born 1 January 1961) is a former South Korean Air Force General who served as its Chairman of Joint Chiefs of Staff (JCS) from 2020 to 2022 under President Moon Jae-in.

Before promoted to the Air Force Chief of Staff in April 2019, Won had served as the Deputy Chairman of the Joint Chiefs of Staff from November 2018.

== Early life and education ==
Won was born at Wonju and finished high school at the Seoul Jungkyung High School, where he graduated in 1979 and entered the Korea Air Force Academy in 1980 and graduated at the academy as part of the Class 32 in 1984. He also attended various courses locally and abroad. He entered the Squadron Officer School in 1990 at the Maxwell Air Force Base in Montgomery, Alabama. He returned to the Maxwell Air Force Base and attended the Combined Force Air Component Commander's Course in 2011. He also studied at the Hannam University, where he earned his Master of Arts Degree in National Security & Defense Policy in 2006. He also entered the Advanced Center for Administrative Development at the Seoul National University in 2015, and became a PhD Candidate for Security & Foreign Policy at the Kyonggi University in 2020.

== Military career ==
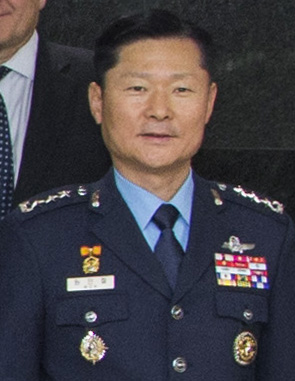
Then-Lieutenant General Won In-choul in 2017

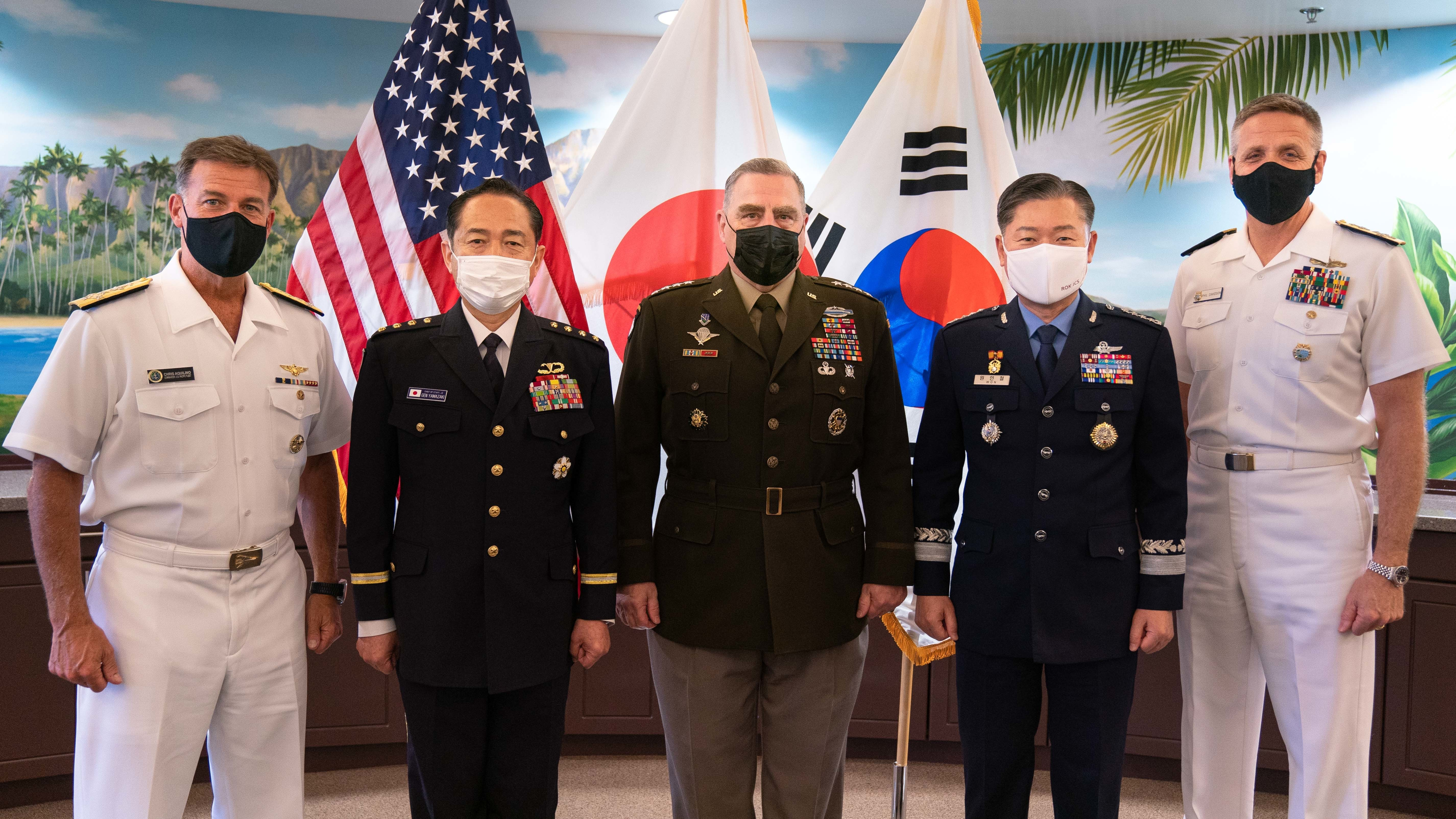
General Won In-choul (2nd from left) meets with US Admirals John C. Aquilino and Philip S. Davidson, US Chairman of the Joint Chiefs of Staff Gen. Mark A. Milley, and Japanese Chief of Staff, Joint Staff Gen. Kōji Yamazaki (2021)

After graduating at the Korea Air Force Academy in 1984, Won commanded various units of the Republic of Korea Air Force (ROKAF) and also served at the Office of the Joint Chiefs of Staff. He also spent his time flying fighters, primarily the F-16C/D (Block 32). Won served as a Secretary to the Chief of Staff, Republic of Korea Air Force and as Director at the Korea Air & Space Operations Center of the Air Force Operations Command in December 2010, and served as the Commander of the 19th Fighter Wing, where he flew the F-16C/D (Block 32) fighter aircraft, based at Jungwon Air Base in Chungju, North Chungcheong Province in May 2012. Won became the Director for Exercise & Training, J37, at the Office of the Joint Chiefs of Staff in April 2014, and became the Vice Chief of Staff of the Air Force, the ROKAF's second highest post in October 2015. He became Commander of the Air Force Operations Command, the ROKAF's overall operations command in October 2016, and was named as the Chief Director for Military Support, at the Joint Chiefs of Staff in October 2017.

He became the Vice Chairman of the Joint Chiefs of Staff in November 2018, and was named as the 37th Chief of Staff of the Air Force on April 16, 2019, before being named by President Moon Jae-in as the new Chairman of the Joint Chiefs of Staff on August 31, 2020. He officially took helm as the Chairman of the Joint Chiefs of Staff on September 23, 2020, replacing General Park Han-ki. Lee Seong-yong was appointed as his successor as Chief of Staff of the Air Force.

Won's nomination is deemed unorthodox as Won is nominated for lower ranking post than Suh Wook, a nominee for new defense minister who joined the military a year later than Won.

== Effective dates of promotion ==
Promotions
Insignia	Rank	Year
	General	2019
	Lieutenant General	2015
	Major General	2013
	Brigadier General	2010

== Awards ==
- Order of National Security Merit (2012)
- Legion of Merit, degree of Officer, by the United States Armed Forces (2013)
- Presidential Distinguished Graduate Award at Command and Staff Course (1994)
- Presidential Citation (2006)

Military offices
Preceded by Lee Jong-seop	Vice chairman of the Joint Chiefs of Staff; 2018–2019	Succeeded by Choi Hyeon-guk
Preceded by Lee Wang-keun	Chief of Staff of the Air Force; 2019–2020	Succeeded by Lee Seong-yong
Preceded by Park Han-ki	Chairman of the Joint Chiefs of Staff; 2020–2022	Succeeded by Kim Seung-kyum
