= Tiger Scout (Korea Scout Association) =

Rank given by the Korea Scout Association

- Owner: Korea Scout Association
- Website tigerscout.kr

- Tiger Scout
- Hangul: 범스카우트
- Revised Romanization: Beom Seukauteu
- McCune–Reischauer: Pŏm Sŭk'aut'ŭ

The Tiger Scout (Korean: 범스카우트) is the highest rank and award a Scout or Venture Scout can achieve in the Korea Scout Association.

The Tiger Scout Association of Korea is the organization of the members who have achieved the Tiger Scout award.

== See also ==
- List of highest awards in Scouting
