= Kim Chung-yul =

Prime Minister of South Korea

His Excellency Kim Chung-yul
- 김정렬
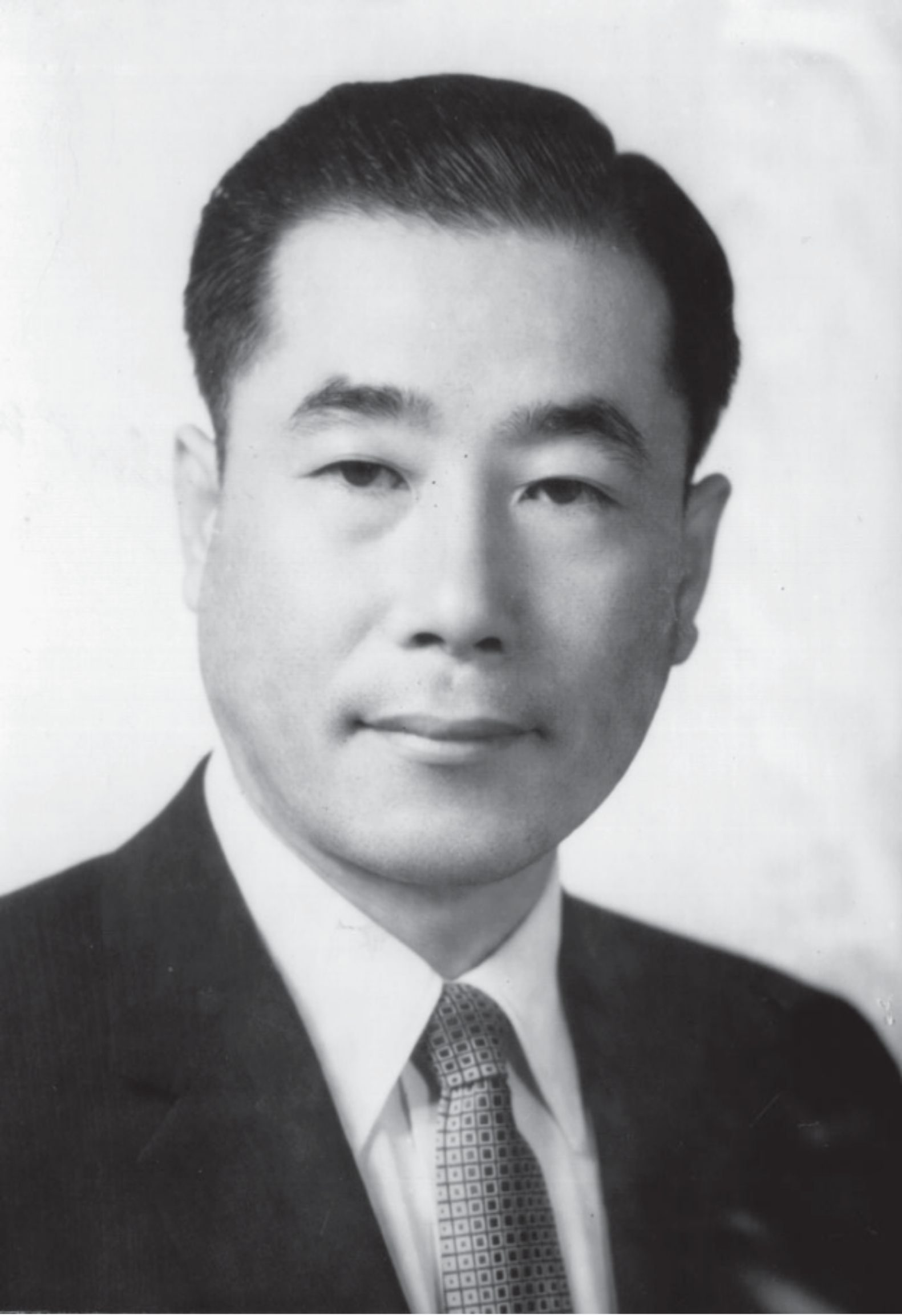

6th Minister of National Defense
- In office 6 July 1957 – 2 May 1960
- President: Syngman Rhee
- Prime Minister: Position abolished
- Vice President: Chang Myon
- Preceded by: Kim Yong-woo
- Succeeded by: Lee Jong-chan

19th Prime Minister of South Korea
- In office 14 July 1987 – 6 August 1987 (acting)
- President: Chun Doo-hwan
- Preceded by: Lho Shin-yong; Lee Han-key (acting)
- Succeeded by: (Himself)
- In office 7 August 1987 – 24 February 1988
- President: Chun Doo-hwan
- Preceded by: (Himself)
- Succeeded by: Lee Hyun-jae

Personal details
- Born: 29 September 1917 Keijō, Korea, Empire of Japan
- Died: 7 September 1992 (aged 74) Seoul, South Korea

Korean name
- Hangul: 김정렬
- Hanja: 金貞烈
- RR: Gim Jeongryeol
- MR: Kim Chŏngnyŏl

Kim Chung-yul (Korean: 김정렬, 29 September 1917 – 7 September 1992) was a South Korean Air Force officer who served as the prime minister of South Korea from July 1987 to February 1988.

== Personal life ==
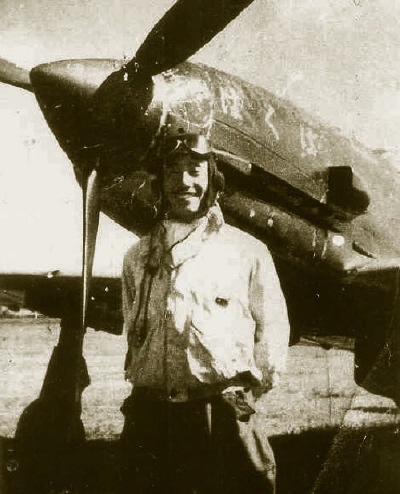
Kim as an IJA captain standing next to his Kawasaki Ki-61

He was born on 29 September 1917. He graduated from Imperial Japanese Army Air Academy and Akeno Army Aviation School. He fought the Royal Air Force primarily in Southeast Asia and was a IJA Captain at the end of WW2.

He was South Korean Ambassador to United States and National Defence Minister. He served in the Korean Air Force during World War II. On 7 September 1992, he died after a lengthy illness. His native city was Seoul.

Political offices
Preceded by Lho Shin-yong	Prime Minister of South Korea; July 14, 1987–February 25, 1988	Succeeded by Lee Hyun-jae
