= Woo Bum-kon incident =

1982 spree killing in South Korea

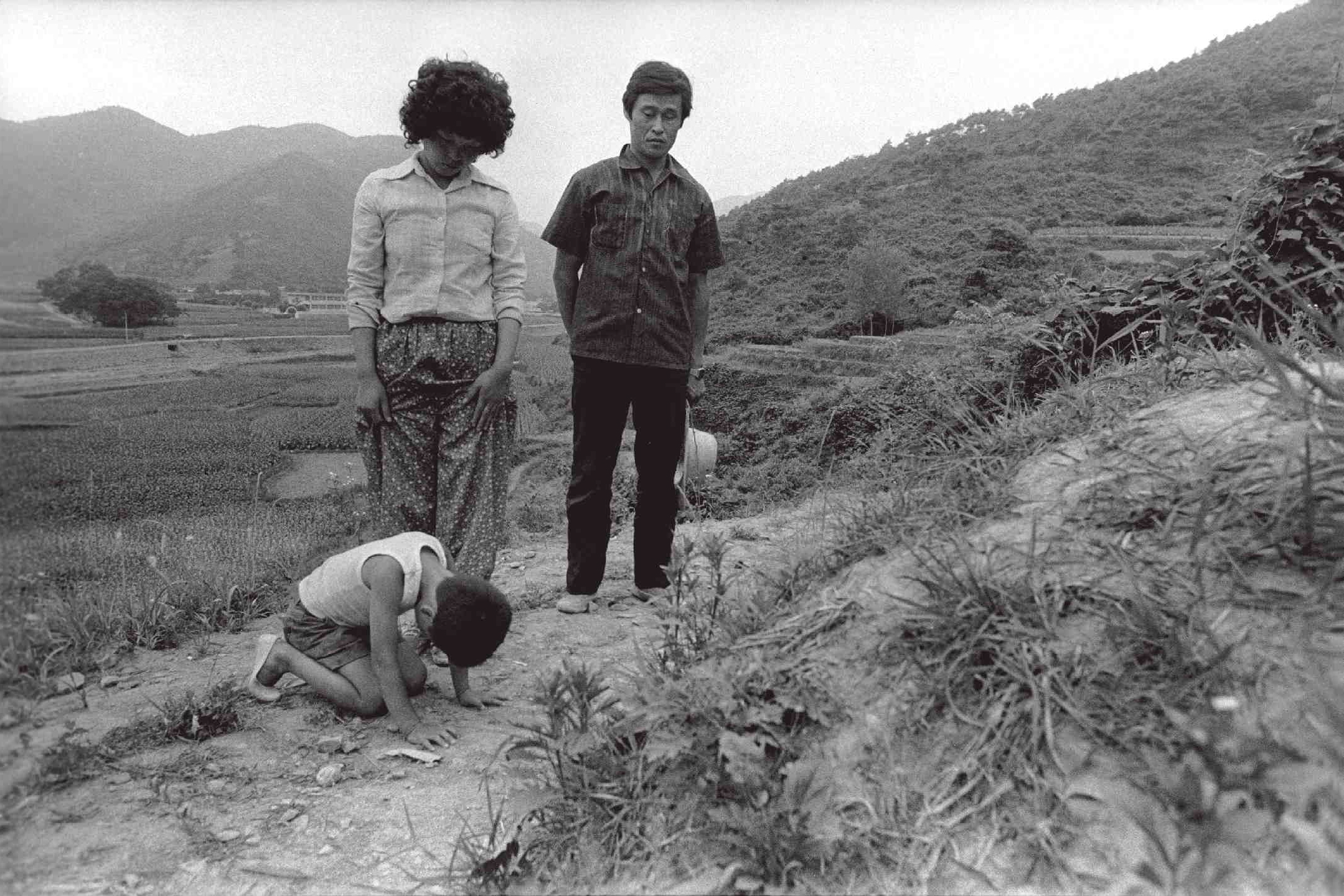
- A child grieves after losing his family in the massacre.

- Uiryeong (South Korea)
- Location: 35.4439°N 128.2761°E; Gungnyu, Uiryeong County, South Korea
- Date: April 26, 1982 – April 27, 1982 c. 9:30 p.m. – 5:45 a.m. (KST)
- Attack type: Mass shooting; grenade attack; suicide bombing
- Weapons: Two M2 carbines; Seven hand grenades
- Deaths: 57+ (including the perpetrator)
- Injuries: 35+
- Perpetrator: Woo Bum-kon

The Woo Bum-kon incident (Korean: 우범곤 사건), also known as the Uiryeong shooting incident (의령 총기 사건) or Officer Woo incident (우 순경 사건), was a spree killing that occurred during the night from April 26 to April 27, 1982, in Uiryeong County, South Gyeongsang Province, South Korea. Policeman Woo Bum-kon murdered 56 people and wounded around 35 others in four villages using two stolen rifles and explosives. Woo killed himself in a suicide bombing with three hostages before a police response. It remains the deadliest mass shooting in South Korea’s history.

In the aftermath of the attack, several high-profile South Korean politicians resigned or were suspended, and a commission was formed to assess the handling of the massacre by the police. In 2024, a memorial to the victims of the attack was established in Uiryeong.

It remained the deadliest shooting spree carried out by a single perpetrator in modern history until it was surpassed by the 2011 Norway attacks, in which Anders Behring Breivik killed 77 people.

== Background ==
An undated photo of Woo

Woo Bum-kon (Note: In this Korean name, the family name is Woo.) (also romanized as Wou Bom-kon; Korean: 우범곤; Hanja: 禹范坤; born November 5, 1955) was born in Choryang, located in Dong District, Busan. His father was also a policeman, and he aspired to follow in his footsteps. He had served in the Marines, where he was recognized as a skilled marksman until his discharge in 1978.

In December 1980, Woo joined the National Police in Busan. He was reportedly still well-regarded for his marksmanship and from April to December 1981, Woo was assigned to "special duty" as a guard at the Blue House. However, Woo was informally demoted due to complaints regarding his "severe drinking habits and violent temper", and stationed to Gungnyu myeon in Uiryeong County. He lived in Apgok ri, where he began dating a local woman, Chun Mal-soon. Within a few months, the pair moved in together with plans of marriage, but Chun's family refused to sanction the relationship due to Woo's alcohol problems.

According to Chun, Woo had an inferiority complex, and had been bothered by villagers' comments about him co-habitating with his girlfriend. She also described him as "a little eccentric". On the day of the shooting, Woo, visibly drunk, shot at a resident, who later recalled that Woo kept muttering phrases such as "This filthy world" and "I can't be a police officer".

== Attack ==
On the afternoon of April 26, 1982, Woo had an argument with his live-in girlfriend, Chun Mal-soon (전말순; 全末順), after she had woken him by swatting a fly on his chest. Enraged, Woo left the house and went to the Gungnyu police station, where he reported for duty at 4:00 p.m. According to early reports, he began drinking heavily, though eyewitnesses later said that he did not appear drunk during his rampage. According to local officials, he would have been unable to cover 4 km (2.5 mi) of difficult, rocky terrain while intoxicated.

At about 7:30 p.m., Woo returned home, assaulted Chun and smashed their furniture before making his way to the reservists' armory and gathering several weapons, including two M2 carbines, at least 180 rounds of ammunition, and seven hand grenades. Of Woo's four colleagues, three had left their post during working hours while another had been off-duty, with all four reportedly skipping work to go to a hot spring. American reports stated that Woo had gained access to the armory by offering to take another officer's shift.

=== Chronology ===
At approximately 9:30 p.m., Woo shot and killed a pedestrian before entering the local post office in Togok, where he killed three people, including a telephone operator, and cut the phone lines. At about 10:00 p.m., Woo returned to Apgok, where he fatally shot six people and wounded Chun, who had gone out to find him. At 10:30 p.m., outside of Ungye, Woo took 18-year-old schoolboy Kim Ju-dong (김주동) hostage and ordered Kim to get him a soft drink from a grocery store owned by 52-year-old Shin We-do (신외도). After getting what he had asked for, Woo killed Kim and then attacked the store owner and his family. Shin managed to escape after being shot in the leg while his wife Son Won-jeom and his daughters Chang-sun and Su-jeong were killed. Woo continued his shooting at the marketplace, killing an additional 14 residents before making his way towards Pyeongchon.

Arriving in the village at 11:00 p.m., Woo came upon a funeral home, where several residents had gathered for a wake being held inside. Although confused at the appearance of an armed policeman, the residents allowed Woo to stay. After receiving a drink, Woo paid his respects to the deceased and offered to give ₩3,000 as condolence money. At this point, one of the guests noticed the grenades around Woo's waist, prompting him to ask Woo to set down his drink and explain why he was carrying the weapons. When another guest, apparently believing the firearms to be unloaded, touched one of the carbines and asked why Woo would carry empty guns, Woo opened fire on the guests.

=== Police response, Woo's death ===
Although police were alerted within minutes of the first shots being fired, it took them an hour to gather a team of 37 officers to search for the gunman, and the national police headquarters in Seoul was not informed until 1:40 a.m. Around that time, Woo found refuge in a farmhouse belonging to 68-year-old Suh In-Su, claiming that he was chasing a Communist infiltrator, and that the family should gather in the main room of the house so he could protect them. When the family gathered at his request, he held them hostage.

At around 3:40 a.m., Woo strapped two grenades to his chest and detonated them, killing himself and three of his hostages. The homeowner Suh survived, although he was seriously injured. Police were unaware of Woo's whereabout until the morning hours. Inside the home, police recovered four rounds of ammunition and one hand grenade from inside the farmhouse.

== Victims ==
Besides Woo, 56 people died in the shooting while 35 others were wounded. Six of the deaths were of people mortally wounded who died several hours later in hospitals, including a child who died on May 8. At that time, the injured were being treated in hospitals in Jinju and Masan. The youngest victim was a one-week-old infant, while the oldest was a woman in her 70s. In total, 4 people were killed in Togok, 6 in Agok, 15 in Ungye and 28 in Pyeongchon.

The death toll is disputed from source to source. 57 people were confirmed dead initially, and 6 were later confirmed dead due to related injuries, but some South Korean sources state that the death toll may have risen to at least 79 after multiple injured victims succumbed to their wounds. Despite the conflicting reports on the death toll, the injury count consistently remains around 35 or more from all available sources. Due to the vast area covered during the rampage, three different hospitals took in the victims, leading some victims to be counted twice, giving way for discrepancies in various news reports.

== Investigation ==
At the time, local police concluded that the shootings were committed in an intoxicated state due to anger stemming from Woo's argument with his girlfriend. However, this motive was challenged and a later re-examination by the Incident Cause Investigation Unit instead determined that Woo had acted out of dissatisfaction with his demotion.

== Aftermath ==
The state-controlled Yonhap News Agency did not report on the incident on orders of the government under President Chun Doo-hwan, which contributed to a lack of commemoration for the victims until 2024. Earlier, on April 10, 1982, the Chun government had launched the National Movement for Consciousness Reform, due to which South Korean authorities viewed the killings, which were reported as the worst incident of mass murder in history, as bad publicity for both domestic and international politics. Reports only began in the evening of April 27, with articles containing little information and the incident only became widely known when independent press reporters arrived in Uiryeong.

After the shootings, it was found that the four other officers of the Gungnyu police station, including the chief of police, had not been working that night and secretly spent time at a hot spring. They were subsequently arrested for negligence of duty. Criticism was also levied at the police response, as officers were dispatched near the end of Woo's murders, having also opened fire on an uninvolved resident during the search for Woo.

The Interior Minister of South Korea, Suh Chung-hwa, and the national police chief, A Eung-mo, offered to resign as a form of atonement for Woo's rampage. Suh Chung-hwa, whom President Chun held responsible for the incident, resigned his commission on April 29, and Roh Tae-woo was appointed Interior Minister.

A special parliamentary team was formed, consisting of 19 parliamentarians and led by Home Affairs Committee chairman Kim Chong-hoh, to investigate the massacre and its disastrous handling by the police. Furthermore, the South Korean Cabinet compensated the victims and their families.

In March 2017, it was reported that director Na Hong-jin had plans to adapt the killings into a movie, after previously directing The Chaser, which was loosely inspired by serial killer Yoo Young-chul. Na clarified that he had no deadline for the project and that only a single screenwriter was working on the idea.

=== Memorial ===
In 2018, a petition for a memorial was launched by Jeon Byeong-tae, whose 19-year-old son was killed in the incident. The petition received the backing of 3,000 people and was submitted to South Gyeongsang provincial authorities. Several additional petitions were forwarded to the National Petition to the Blue House throughout 2021 and in December of that year, Uiryeong County Governor Oh Tae-wan propose a memorial park in a meeting with Prime Minister Kim Boo-kyum. A committee was formed, which finalized the design of the park in 2022, reaching completion with the finalization of the main monument design in November 2023. With a ₩700,000,000 funding by the Ministry of the Interior and Safety, the "Uiryeong 4.26 Memorial Park" (의령4.26추모공원) was officially opened on April 26, 2024, the 42nd anniversary of the attack. The first proper public memorial service was held at 10 a.m. the same day. The park houses a memorial monument and tower, depicting two golden hands releasing a dove in to the sky. A wall with a list of victims carved into the side is situated directly behind the main monument, listing 56 deceased victims and another 34 injured.
