= Jeon Hae-cheol =

South Korean lawyer and politician

- 전해철
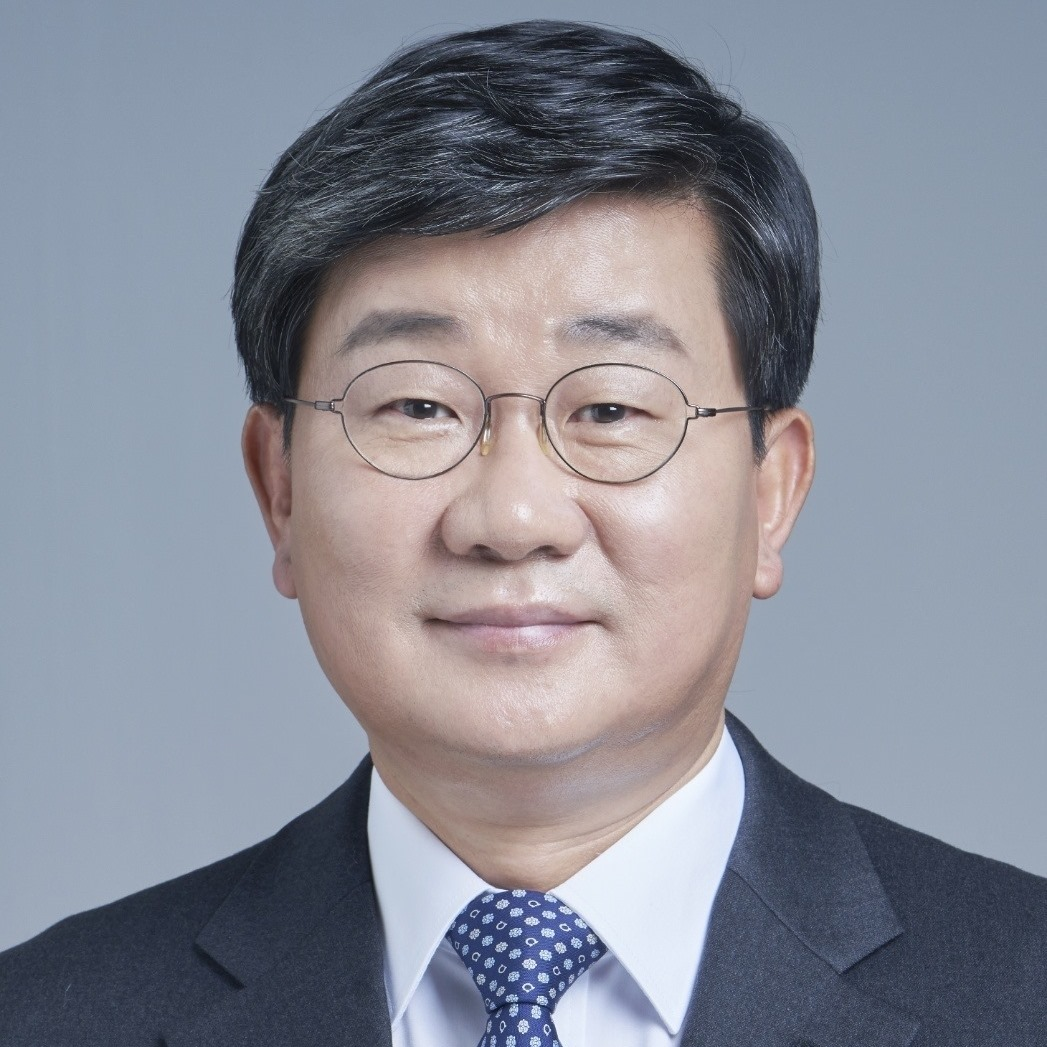

Minister of the Interior and Safety
- In office 24 December 2020 – 12 May 2022
- President: Moon Jae-in; Yoon Suk Yeol
- Prime Minister: Chung Sye-kyun; Hong Nam-ki (acting); Kim Boo-kyum; Choo Kyung-ho (acting)
- Preceded by: Chin Young
- Succeeded by: Lee Sang-min

Senior Secretary to the President for Civil Affairs
- In office 3 May 2006 – 21 December 2007
- President: Roh Moo-hyun
- Preceded by: Moon Jae-in
- Succeeded by: Lee Ho-chul

Member of the National Assembly
- In office 30 May 2012 – 29 May 2024
- Preceded by: Lee Hwa-soo
- Succeeded by: Yang Moon-seok (Ansan A, Gyeonggi)
- Constituency: Ansan Sangnok A (Gyeonggi)

Personal details
- Born: 18 May 1962 (age 64) Mokpo, South Jeolla, South Korea
- Party: Democratic
- Other political affiliations: UDP (2008); Democratic (2008–2011); DUP (2011–2013); Democratic (2013–2014); NPAD (2014–2015)
- Spouse: Chang Sun-hui
- Children: 2
- Education: Korea University
- Occupation: Lawyer, politician

- Jeon Hae-cheol
- Hangul: 전해철
- Hanja: 全海澈
- RR: Jeon Haecheol
- MR: Chŏn Haech'ŏl

Jeon Hae-cheol (Korean: 전해철, born on 18 May 1962) is a South Korean lawyer and politician who served as the Minister of the Interior and Safety from 2020 to 2022. He formerly served as the Senior Secretary to the President for Civil Affairs from 2006 to 2007, under the then President Roh Moo-hyun.

He has also been the Member of the National Assembly for Sangnok 1st constituency since 2012. He is one of the key figures of the pro-Moon Jae-in, as well as one of "3 Cheols (3철)".

== Early life and education ==
Jeon Hae-cheol was born in Mokpo, South Jeolla on 18 May 1962. His father was originally from Pyongyang, but had moved to Mokpo during the Korean War. He is the youngest among the 5 siblings.

He was educated at Daesung Primary School and Youngheung Secondary School. During these time, he was described as an extrovert student who liked exercises, writing and discussions. Due to the financial problems of his family, he was raised under his eldest brother, who was working in Masan (now under Changwon), South Gyeongsang during that time. He had completed his high school education at Masan Central High School, where only had 2 students from Honam including him; at first, he thought he was the sole student from Honam. He later described that he was often mocked by his classmates for speaking Jeolla dialect. From these experiences, he has realised that regionalism is "baseless but harmful".

In 1979, when he was a Form 2 student, he observed the Bu-Ma Democratic Protests with his seniors. He had been interested in social justice and human rights since then. He had joined the protests for several times, though never led any of them. He moved to Seoul in 1981 and enrolled in Korea University, where he studied law. Following the graduation in 1985, he was qualified for the bar in 1987. He had completed his national service as a military prosecutor in Yanggu, Gangwon.

== Legal career ==
After completing his national service, Jeon joined Haemaru Law Firm in 1993, where he met Roh Moo-hyun who later became the President of the Republic. He became a lawyer specialising labour issues, defending and helping foreign workers, industrial victims and so on. A member of the Lawyers for a Democratic Society, he served the Chairman of the International Cooperation Committee, Director for International Cooperation of the Labour Committee, and Chairman of the Media Committee within the organisation from 1996, making him as one of its key figures.

In 2000, he was in charge of Suzy Kim case, where Suzy Kim was murdered by her husband, Yoon Tae-shik, in Hong Kong in 1987. The case was controversial as the then South Korean government under Chun Doo-hwan was reported manipulating the case. Jeon, as a key lawyer of the case, led Yoon to be arrested and charged in November 2001. Finally, on 15 August 2003, Suzy's family had finally won the case and was awarded 4,200,000,000 won (£2,878,129).

== Political career ==
In the 1997 presidential election, Jeon helped Kwon Young-ghil, the candidate of the National Victory for Development 21, who was not elected.

During the 2002 presidential election, Jeon was one of the key figures leading the victory of the Millennium Democratic Party (MDP) presidential candidate Roh Moo-hyun. Originally, Roh had become the party's presidential candidate in April 2002 amid upset victory, but was forced to resign following the party's huge defeat in the 2002 local elections. To overcome this crisis, Jeon had established a legal aid group to support Roh and became its assistant administrator. Finally, in the election on 19 December, Roh defeated the Grand National Party (GNP) candidate Lee Hoi-chang and was elected the new President of the Republic.

In 2004, the opposition MPs had voted 193 to 2 in favour of the impeachment of the President Roh, where the de facto ruling Uri Party was excluded. Jeon was one of the key figures to form a counsel to defend Roh. After the impeachment trial of the President Roh was overturned by the Constitutional Court, Jeon became the Secretary to the President for Civil Affairs. On 3 May 2006, he was appointed the Senior Secretary to the President for Civil Affairs, replacing the incumbent Moon Jae-in, who later became the President. Being just unofficially 44 years old (officially 43), he was the youngest person to hold the position.

He resigned from his position on 21 December 2007 in order to contest in the 2008 election. He then contested for Sangnok 1st constituency under the banner of the United Democratic Party (UDP), but was defeated by the GNP candidate Lee Hwa-soo.

=== Member of the National Assembly ===
In the 2012 election, Jeon contested again for Sangnok 1st constituency under the banner of the Democratic Unionist Party (DUP) banner. He was challenged by the then ruling Saenuri candidate Park Sun-hee, but Jeon was still leading at several pollings. He received 46,927 votes and defeated Park with a margin of 16,630 votes.

As the presidential election was in December of the year, Jeon worked close to the DUP presidential candidate Moon Jae-in. However, on 21 October, approximately 2 months before the election, he withdrew from the presidential campaign following the public backlash for being "too pro-Roh Moo-hyun". In the election, Moon finally lost to the Saenuri candidate Park Geun-hye.

In the 2016 election, Jeon again faced another challenge from Lee Hwa-soo, who had defeated him 8 years before. Despite vote splitting of the People's Party (PP), he received 35,481 votes and defeated the Saenuri candidate with a margin of 9,152 votes. On 21 August, he was elected the Democratic Party's Chairman for Gyeonggi, defeating Lee Un-ju.

Prior to the 2018 party leadership election, Jeon was one of the potential candidate for the party presidency. He, however, announced he would not run for the position on 15 July.

In the 2020 election, Jeon faced a challenge from the United Future Party (UFP) candidate Park Ju-won, the former Mayor of Ansan who contested under the banner of the now-defunct PP 4 years ago. He received 58.55% and defeated the former Ansan Mayor.

On 28 April 2020, following the victory of the Democratic Party in the general election, Jeon announced his bid for the party's parliamentary leadership. He, however, lost to Kim Tae-nyeon. On 16 July, he was elected the Chairman of the Intelligence Committee of the National Assembly.

=== 2018 local elections ===
Prior to the 2018 local elections, Jeon was widely considered as the potential candidate for Gyeonggi governorship. In order to run for the party preselection, he announced his resignation as the party chairman for Gyeonggi on 8 January 2018. The position was succeeded by Park Kwang-on.

On 6 March, the same day when the South Chungcheong Governor Ahn Hee-jung had resigned over rape controversy, Jeon officially launched his bid for Gyeonggi governorship. On the day, he promised to hold a referendum to separate the northern part of the province.

Nevertheless, on 20 April, Jeon lost to the former Seongnam Mayor Lee Jae-myung, who had been the most favourable candidate for Gyeonggi governorship. He received approximately 36.80%, while Lee received 59.96%. Although Jeon conceded his defeat and subsequently helped Lee to win, several pro-Moon Jae-in supporters did not accept the result; some even protested that they would rather vote the incumbent and the Liberty Korea Party (LKP) candidate Nam Kyung-pil. On the other hand, Lee won the election, despite several controversies.

=== Minister of the Interior and Safety ===
On 4 December 2020, Jeon was designated the new Minister of the Interior and Safety by the President Moon Jae-in, replacing the incumbent Chin Young. He was officially appointed to the position on 24 December.

== Personal life ==
He married Chang Sun-hui and has a son and a daughter. His son was exempted from the national service due to scoliosis.

== Election results ==
Year	Elections	Constituency	Political party	Votes (%)	Remarks
2008	18th National Assembly General Election	Gyeonggi Ansan Sangnok A	UDP	18,054 (30.08%)	Defeated (2nd)
2012	19th National Assembly General Election	Gyeonggi Ansan Sangnok A	DUP	46,927 (60.76%)	Won
2016	20th National Assembly General Election	Gyeonggi Ansan Sangnok A	Democratic	35,481 (38.80%)	Won
2020	21st National Assembly General Election	Gyeonggi Ansan Sangnok A	Democratic	59,021 (58.55%)	Won
