= Establishment of diplomatic relations between China and South Korea =

The People's Republic of China (PRC) and the Republic of Korea (ROK) established diplomatic relations on 24 August 1992. Before the establishment of diplomatic relations, China and South Korea, which were in opposing camps during the Cold War, only had informal relations. In 1983, the two countries' officials first came into contact due to the hijacking of CAAC Flight 296. After that, economic, trade and cultural exchanges between the two countries began to increase, and two sides sent delegations to participate in the 1986 Seoul Asian Games, the 1988 Seoul Olympics and the 1990 Beijing Asian Games. On 17 September 1991, both North Korea and South Korea joined the United Nations. In 1992, China, which was pursuing reform and opening up, and South Korea, which was pursuing Nordpolitik, formally established diplomatic relations after several rounds of negotiations. This establishment of diplomatic relations marked the collapse of the Cold War system in Northeast Asia and had important significance in the history of international relations.

Since the establishment of diplomatic relations between China and South Korea, exchanges between the two countries in various fields, including politics, economy, and culture, have developed rapidly, complementing each other's strengths, and their cooperative relationship has undergone several upgrades. While developing friendly relations with South Korea, China also continues to maintain its traditional friendship with North Korea. Before establishing diplomatic relations with the PRC, South Korea had long maintained diplomatic relations with the Republic of China (Taiwan). Due to China's "Three Principles on the Establishment of Diplomatic Relations", South Korea severed ties with Taiwan, and relations between the two sides deteriorated for a time. However, after negotiations, economic, trade, and cultural relations between South Korea and Taiwan returned to normal, with each side establishing a mission in Taipei for South Korea and a mission in Seoul for Taiwan.

== Background ==
After the end of World War II, the Korean Peninsula was divided into the communist Democratic People's Republic of Korea (DPRK) in the north and the capitalist Republic of Korea (ROK) in the south. The People's Republic of China (PRC) and South Korea, which were in opposing camps during the Cold War, were in a state of hostility and did not recognize each other. In addition to direct confrontation in the Korean War, the two countries also had several maritime conflicts in the Yellow Sea. The ROK maintained diplomatic relations with the Republic of China (ROC), which had retreated to Taiwan, shortly after its founding. The ROC maintained close relations with South Korea and supported it during the Korean War. The two sides set up embassies in Taipei and Seoul and held several high-level visits. Meanwhile, the PRC recognized DPRK as the only legitimate government of Korea.

In the 1970s, with the easing of the international Cold War situation, the PRC established diplomatic relations with Japan (September 1972) and the United States (January 1979), while the situation on the Korean Peninsula also eased. On 23 June 1973, South Korean President Park Chung Hee issued the "June 23 Declaration", stating that South Korea was willing to implement an open door policy with all socialist countries, including the Soviet Union and China, on the basis of equality and mutual benefit. China started the reform and opening up in 1978 and made significant adjustments to its diplomatic strategy and policies. In March 1988, China opened up the Shandong Peninsula and the Liaodong Peninsula, making Shandong a window for direct trade with South Korea and attracting South Korean investment, and granting Shandong the power to issue entry visas to South Korean businessmen.

On 25 February 1988, newly-elected South Korean President Roh Tae-woo stated in his inaugural address that while further strengthening relations with Western countries, South Korea would also develop relations with Third World countries, "expand channels for international cooperation with continental countries with which South Korea has no exchanges," and "promote a vibrant Nordpolitik."

== Initial contacts ==
On 5 May 1983, CAAC Flight 296 was hijacked and landed in Chuncheon, South Korea. The two countries’ officials began initial contact to deal with the hijacking incident. The administration of President Chun Doo-hwan withstood the pressure from the Taiwanese government and provided assistance to China in the hijacking incident. The two sides used the names of "People’s Republic of China" and "Republic of Korea" for the first time in the memorandum of this negotiation. After that, the exchanges between the two countries in various fields such as economy, culture, and sports became increasingly frequent. Despite the lack of diplomatic relations between the two countries, China sent large sports delegations to participate in the 1986 Asian Games and the 1988 Summer Olympics hosted by South Korea. After the 1988 Olympics, bilateral economic exchanges between the two countries rapidly heated up.

In March 1988, President Roh Tae-woo entrusted his close friend and health care doctor, Han Shenghao, an overseas Chinese from Shandong, China, to explore the path to China and establish contact channels with the Shandong provincial government. On 16 April 1988, Han and two others arrived in Jinan, Shandong as Roh's secret envoys and held talks with Jiang Chunyun, the governor of Shandong. The two sides reached a consensus on developing economic and trade and cultural exchanges and agreed to send inspection teams to visit each other. On 16 June 1988, a 15-member South Korean delegation led by Daewoo Group chairman Kim Woo-choong arrived in Jinan; this was the first South Korean delegation to visit China. Han Shenghao was the advisor of the delegation. On 25 August, a 10-member delegation from Shandong visited Seoul. The head of the delegation was Li Yu, chairman of the Shandong Chamber of Commerce of the China Chamber of International Commerce; this was the first delegation from the PRC to visit South Korea.

In 1990, a delegation of more than 700 South Korean athletes participated in the 11th Asian Games in Beijing. The Roh Tae-woo administration regarded the Asian Games as an "important opportunity" to develop China–South Korea relations. South Korea provided 20% of the funding for the Asian Games, and South Korean companies paid more than US$15 million in advertising fees. Hyundai Motor Group donated hundreds of Hyundai cars to the Beijing Asian Games Organizing Committee, marking its first step in starting a business in Beijing. During the Asian Games, about 4,000 South Korean tourists visited China. The PRC used the official English name of South Korea, the "Republic of Korea", in award ceremonies and formal occasions, and the signs held by the guides for the South Korean delegation during the opening ceremony of the Asian Games also read "Korea".

In January 1991, South Korea established the Korea Trade Promotion Agency Representative Office in Beijing. In April 1991, the PRC established the China Chamber of International Commerce Representative Office in Seoul. In April 1991, Chinese Vice Minister of Foreign Affairs Liu Huaqiu led a delegation of the PRC to Seoul to attend the 47th Annual Meeting of the United Nations Economic and Social Commission for Asia and the Pacific (ESCAP), and held the first meeting between senior diplomatic officials of the two countries with the Chairman of the Conference, Lee Sang-ock, the Minister of Foreign Affairs of South Korea. On 17 September 1991, the two Koreas jointly joined the United Nations, creating conditions for the establishment of diplomatic relations.

== Diplomatic negotiations ==
=== Roh Tae-woo meets with Qian Qichen ===
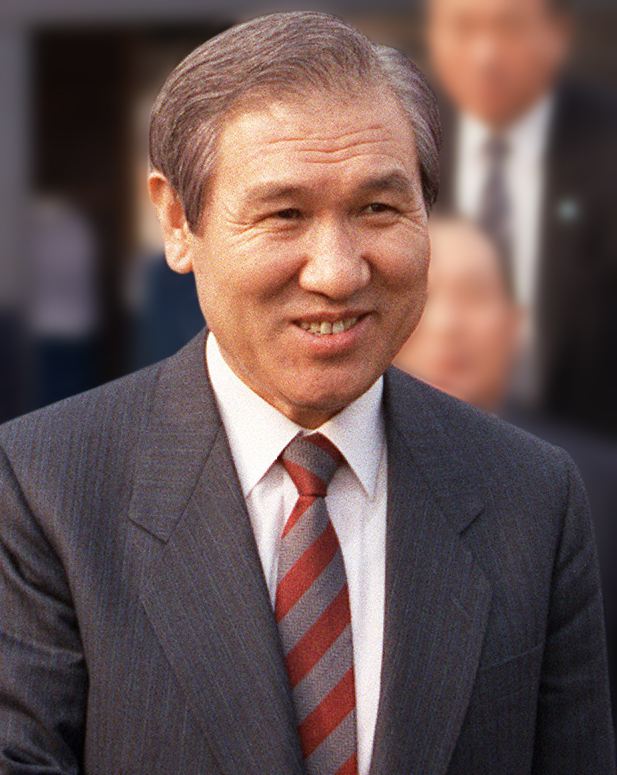
South Korean president Roh Tae-woo

On 12 November 1991, Qian Qichen, the Minister of Foreign Affairs of China, and Li Lanqing, the Minister of Foreign Trade, led a delegation of China to attend the Third Asia-Pacific Economic Cooperation (APEC) Ministerial Meeting held in Seoul; this was the first visit to South Korea by a senior government official of the PRC. The South Korean side attached great importance to the visit of Qian Qichen and his delegation. Lee Si-young, Assistant Minister of Foreign Affairs of South Korea, came to the airport to greet them and "shaked hands warmly" with Qian Qichen and Li Lanqing. Qian was surrounded by reporters at the Hotel Shilla where he was staying. "The reporters were not most concerned about China’s participation in APEC, but whether there would be any changes in the relationship between China and South Korea".

The participation of the Chinese delegation in this APEC Ministerial Meeting was the result of six rounds of negotiations over nine months. The focus of the dispute was the status of the representatives from Taiwan and Hong Kong attending the meeting. The PRC emphasized that, under the premise of one China, the People’s Republic of China would participate in the meeting as a sovereign state, while Taiwan and Hong Kong would participate as regional economies. However, the Taiwanese government emphasized that it should enjoy "equal status" in APEC, did not accept the title "Taiwan, China", and did not agree to the arrangement that its foreign minister could not attend the meeting. South Korean Vice Minister of Foreign Affairs Lee Si-young and Chairman of the APEC Senior Officials’ Meeting, had to travel back and forth between the three places for shuttle diplomacy. In the end, the Taiwanese government had to make concessions under the consideration of practical interests and attend APEC as an economic entity called "Chinese Taipei".

On the afternoon of 12 November, South Korean President Roh Tae-woo met with the ministers of various countries who were present. After the group meeting, South Korean Foreign Minister Lee Sang-ock led Qian Qichen and his delegation into another living room for a private meeting with Roh Tae-woo. Roh and Qian talked for 40 minutes and he proposed to "establish diplomatic relations as soon as possible". Qian put forward three hopes: he hoped that both sides would work together to make the trade relations between the two countries develop better; he hoped that the two Koreas would live in peace and strengthen exchanges; and he hoped that the United States and Japan would improve relations with North Korea. The next day, Qian Qichen and Lee Sang-ock held the first breakfast meeting between the two foreign ministers. Qian's trip to Seoul paved the way for the establishment of diplomatic relations between China and South Korea.

=== Diplomatic negotiations ===
In February 1992, following Deng Xiaoping's southern tour, China accelerated the pace of the reform and opening up. At the same time, the prime ministers of North and South Korea held the sixth inter-Korean high-level talks in Pyongyang, and the two sides exchanged the texts of the Agreement on Reconciliation, Non-Aggression and Cooperation between the North and South and the Joint Declaration on the Denuclearization of the Korean Peninsula, which officially came into effect.

On 12 April 1992, South Korean Foreign Minister Lee Sang-ock arrived in Beijing two days early to attend the 48th United Nations Economic and Social Commission for Asia and the Pacific (ESCAP). As the chairman of the 47th ESCAP, Lee Sang-ock hosted the opening ceremony of the 48th ESCAP in Beijing. On 13 April, Chinese Premier Li Peng met with Lee Sang-ock. During the meeting, Lee conveyed Roh Tae-woo's message of hoping for the normalization of relations between the two countries. Li Peng said that Seoul is geographically close to Beijing, and neighbors should have frequent exchanges, continuing by saying the leaders of China and South Korea need to have direct contact. On the same day, Qian Qichen held a foreign ministers' meeting with Lee Sang-ock. Lee hoped that the foreign ministers' meeting could achieve a substantial breakthrough, but Qian believed that the time was not yet ripe for formal negotiations on establishing diplomatic relations and advocated establishing contact channels first. In the end, both sides agreed to start with secret contacts at the vice-ministerial and ambassadorial levels and start the process of establishing diplomatic relations negotiations as soon as possible.

From 13 to 15 May 1992, Xu Dunxin, the Vice Minister of Foreign Affairs of China, and Ambassador Zhang Ruijie held the first round of pragmatic negotiations on establishing diplomatic relations with Noh Chang-hee and Kwon Byung-hyun, Vice Ministers of Foreign Affairs of South Korea. The focus of the negotiations was how to resolve the issue of diplomatic relations between South Korea and Taiwan. The Chinese side put forward three principles for establishing diplomatic relations: "severing diplomatic ties", "abolishing the treaties", and "withdrawing the embassy". However, the South Korean side only wanted to downgrade its embassy in the ROC to a "liaison office" and did not accept the Chinese side's proposition. The first round of negotiations ended without results. In order to avoid the sensitive touch of the South Korean media, the two sides agreed that the second round of negotiations would still be held in Beijing, where the secrecy measures were strict.

From 1 to 3 June 1992, the two sides held the second round of negotiations on establishing diplomatic relations. China reiterated the three principles for establishing diplomatic relations. South Korea softened its position and agreed to sever diplomatic ties, but due to its long-standing relationship with the ROC, South Korea hoped to maintain a "special relationship" with Taiwan after establishing diplomatic relations with China, namely a semi-official relationship that could use telegraphic codes and diplomatic means. China listened carefully to South Korea's opinions, but did not respond to its request. In fact, all countries that signed treaties with the ROC acted in accordance with the three principles for establishing diplomatic relations with the PRC. South Korea was also well aware of this.

From 19 to 20 June 1992, the two sides held their third round of negotiations in a secluded villa on the top floor of the Sheraton Walkerhill Hotel in Seoul. To avoid the media, the Chinese negotiating representatives were given a special passage by the South Korean side after arriving at Gimpo International Airport, and then took a minibus directly to the negotiation site. The South Korean side accepted the three principles for establishing diplomatic relations from the Chinese side during this negotiation, and the two sides quickly reached an agreement on establishing diplomatic relations. After initialing and exchanging texts, the representatives of both sides took their first group photo to celebrate the successful completion of the negotiations.

=== Notification of North Korea ===
Since North Korea is a traditional ally of China, during the negotiations on the establishment of diplomatic relations between China and South Korea, China needed to consider how to inform North Korea. Deng Xiaoping once pointed out that the issue with South Korea was delicate and needed to be handled with caution, and that North Korea needed to express its understanding. Regarding the establishment of a non-governmental trade office between China and South Korea, Qian Qichen contacted North Korean Foreign Minister Kim Yong-nam in 1988, and Jiang Zemin, the General Secretary of the Chinese Communist Party, contacted North Korean leader Kim Il Sung in 1989 and 1990, respectively, and obtained the other party's understanding.

On 14 April 1992, Chinese President Yang Shangkun visited North Korea to congratulate Kim Il Sung on his 80th birthday. Entrusted by the Central Committee of the Chinese Communist Party and General Secretary Jiang Zemin, President Yang Shangkun once again informed General Secretary Kim Il Sung of China's consideration of establishing diplomatic relations with South Korea. Kim Il Sung said, "The current situation on the Korean Peninsula is in a delicate period. I hope that China can coordinate the relations between China and South Korea and between North Korea and the United States." Regarding the progress of North Korea–U.S. relations, he asked the Chinese side to "give the matter further consideration" and appropriately delay the establishment of diplomatic relations between China and South Korea.

Based on considerations for North Korea, China proposed the "cross-recognition" approach during negotiations with South Korea, hoping to exchange the establishment of diplomatic relations between China and South Korea for recognition of North Korea by the United States and Japan. (Note: The concept of "cross-recognition" was proposed by U.S. Secretary of State Henry Kissinger at the 30th session of the United Nations General Assembly in September 1975. Its core idea was for China, the Soviet Union, the United States, and Japan to mutually recognize the regimes of both North and South Korea, followed by the admission of both Koreas to the United Nations. At the time, North Korea condemned and rejected Kissinger's proposal, viewing it as a move to perpetuate and institutionalize the division of the Korean Peninsula; China adopted a position aligned with that of North Korea. However, as the geopolitical landscape shifted, North Korea changed its stance, and China subsequently adjusted its policy, shifting to advocate for using "cross-recognition" to facilitate dialogue between North Korea and the United States and Japan.) However, in February 1992, after the Joint Declaration on the Denuclearization of the Korean Peninsula came into effect, North Korea suddenly and forcefully refused the International Atomic Energy Agency's inspection of its nuclear facilities, leading to a stalemate in bilateral dialogues between North Korea and the United States, and between North Korea and Japan. Therefore, South Korea politely rejected China's proposal for "cross-recognition" during the negotiations. South Korea also pointed out that the establishment of diplomatic relations between South Korea and the Soviet Union did not involve "cross-recognition". The establishment of diplomatic relations between China and South Korea should also be transformed into a bilateral issue and should no longer involve multiple countries and parties. China accepted South Korea's opinion and no longer used "cross-recognition" as a premise. In exchange, South Korea did not make any demands for adjustments to the Treaty on Friendship, Cooperation and Mutual Assistance between China and North Korea.

On 15 July 1992, Chinese Foreign Minister Qian Qichen, having just returned from a visit to Africa, was entrusted by General Secretary Jiang Zemin to travel to Pyongyang by Air Force special plane to convey a message from China to South Korea regarding the establishment of diplomatic relations, demonstrating China's utmost respect for North Korea. The message reiterated China's continued efforts to develop Sino–North Korean friendship, support North Korea's construction and peaceful reunification, and promote the improvement of relations between North Korea and the United States, and North Korea and Japan. After listening, Kim Il Sung pondered for a moment and said, "I understand General Secretary Jiang's message. We understand that China independently, autonomously, and equally decides its own foreign policy, and we will continue to strive to enhance friendly relations with China." He emphasized that North Korea "will overcome all difficulties and continue to independently uphold and build socialism." He also asked Qian Qichen to convey his regards to Deng Xiaoping and other leaders of the CCP Central Committee. After viewing the handicrafts and gifts brought by Qian Qichen, he saw him off. Qian Qichen recalled, "This meeting was the shortest of all the meetings Chairman Kim had ever held with the Chinese delegation, and there was no banquet held afterward as was customary." After this meeting, Kim Il Sung, who had visited China more than 30 times, either publicly or secretly, never set foot on Chinese soil again during his lifetime.

After the establishment of diplomatic relations between China and South Korea, relations between China and North Korea began to cool down. In 1993, China took the initiative to send two high-level delegations to North Korea in order to continue to maintain and develop the traditional friendship between China and North Korea. In July and September 1993, Hu Jintao, then a member of the Politburo Standing Committee and the Secretariat, and Wang Hanbin, an alternate member of the Politburo and Vice Chairman of the Standing Committee of the National People's Congress, led delegations to North Korea respectively. From 1995 onwards, relations between the two countries began to warm up and return to normal.

== Formal establishment of diplomatic relations ==
On 21 August 1992, South Korea announced the imminent formal establishment of diplomatic relations with China, and Foreign Minister Lee Sang-ock was scheduled to visit China from 23 to 26 August. On 22 August, after confirming that the severance of diplomatic ties with its last Asian ally was irreversible, Taiwanese Foreign Minister Fredrick Chien announced comprehensive retaliatory measures against South Korea: the ROC would sever diplomatic relations with South Korea from the date the PRC established diplomatic relations; it would refuse the request for a South Korean government special envoy to visit Taiwan in early September to explain the reasons for the severance; it would cancel all preferential trade treatment with South Korea from the date of the establishment of diplomatic relations; and it would cease implementation of the civil aviation agreement between the two sides from 15 September. On the same day, Taiwanese Minister of Economic Affairs Vincent Siew announced that all special preferential treatment previously provided to South Korea would be canceled after the severance of diplomatic relations, and the existing trade agreements between the two sides would be terminated. The subsequent retaliatory economic measures mainly included: suspending import quotas for South Korean cars and fruits; canceling South Korean manufacturers' opportunities to participate in bidding for future state-owned enterprises in Taiwan; and immediately suspending and never holding further ministerial-level economic cooperation meetings between the two sides. After the ROC severed diplomatic relations with South Korea, the embassy in Myeong-dong was handed over to the People's Republic of China for use as an embassy. During the evacuation, the staff of the ROC embassy damaged the walls, carpets, tables and chairs and other facilities.

On 24 August 1992, Chinese Foreign Minister Qian Qichen and South Korean Foreign Minister Lee Sang-ock signed the Joint Communiqué on the Establishment of Diplomatic Relations between the People's Republic of China and the Republic of Korea at Fangfei Garden, Diaoyutai State Guesthouse in Beijing, formally establishing diplomatic relations at the ambassadorial level. Nearly 100 Chinese and foreign journalists broadcast the signing ceremony live. On the afternoon of the same day, Yang Shangkun and Li Peng met with Lee Sang-ock and his delegation respectively. On the same day, Roh Tae-woo issued a special statement on the establishment of diplomatic relations between China and South Korea. On 25 August, the People's Daily published an editorial entitled "Congratulations on the Establishment of Diplomatic Relations between China and South Korea". Media from all over the world reported on the establishment of diplomatic relations between China and South Korea. The United States Department of State issued a statement believing that the establishment of diplomatic relations between China and South Korea "helps to ease tensions on the Korean Peninsula". Russia's Central Television published a commentary believing that the establishment of diplomatic relations between China and South Korea "fundamentally changed the situation in East Asia and will undoubtedly strengthen the status of the two countries in the Asia-Pacific region". The Japanese government also praised the establishment of diplomatic relations between China and South Korea, believing that it "helps to peace and stability in East Asia".

On 27 August 1992, Pei Jiayi, the temporary representative of the Chinese Embassy in South Korea, presided over the flag-raising ceremony for the opening of the Chinese Embassy in South Korea at his residence in Itaewon. On 12 September, Zhang Tingyan, the first Chinese Ambassador to South Korea, arrived in Seoul to assume his post. On 14 September, Zhang Tingyan presented his credentials to President Roh Tae-woo at the Blue House. The Korean Representative Office in Beijing was upgraded to the Embassy of South Korea in China on 28 August 1992. On 7 September, Roh Tae-woo appointed Roh Jae-won, an official of the Representative Office in China, as South Korea's first Ambassador to China. On 14 September, Roh Jae-won presented his credentials to President Yang Shangkun in Beijing. On 5 February 1993, the Chinese Embassy in South Korea officially moved to its office location in Myeong-dong and held a flag-raising ceremony for the new building.

== Aftermath ==
On 27 September 1992, South Korean President Roh Tae-woo led a large delegation to visit China just one month after the establishment of diplomatic relations between the two countries. Before departing, Roh Tae-woo said that the establishment of diplomatic relations between South Korea and China "marked the end of the last Cold War system left over from the Cold War era in the world - the Northeast Asian Cold War system"; the visit to China showed that "we have now reached the last gate to Pyongyang - Beijing"; the upcoming South Korea–China summit will build a "precious step" for the reunification of the North and South and open a new era in South Korea–China relations. The first visit of the South Korean president to China marked a perfect end to Roh Tae-woo's Nordpolitik. In Beijing, Roh Tae-woo met with Chinese leaders including CCP General Secretary Jiang Zemin, President Yang Shangkun, and Premier Li Peng. He also invited President Yang Shangkun to visit South Korea. The two sides issued a joint press communiqué in Beijing and signed the China–Korea Trade Agreement, the China–Korea Investment Protection Agreement, the China–Korea Agreement on the Establishment of the Joint Economic, Trade and Technology Committee, and the China–Korea Science and Technology Agreement.

Since the establishment of diplomatic relations, China–South Korea relations have been continuously improved, with frequent high-level visits between the two sides and rapid development in trade, culture and personnel exchanges. In November 1995, Jiang Zemin visited South Korea, which was the first visit by China's top leader to South Korea after the establishment of diplomatic relations between China and South Korea. In December 1998, during the visit of South Korean President Kim Dae-jung to China, the relationship between the two countries was upgraded to "cooperative partnership for the 21st century", and in 2003 it was further upgraded to "comprehensive cooperative partnership for the 21st century". In May 2008, when South Korean President Lee Myung-bak visited China, the China-South Korea relationship was upgraded again to "China–South Korea strategic cooperative partnership", which made the bilateral relationship mature.

=== Development of relations between South Korea and Taiwan ===
After South Korea severed diplomatic ties with the ROC, it transferred the ROC's embassy building in South Korea to the PRC, which worsened bilateral relations and became one of the reasons for the Taiwan's anti-South Korea stance. After the two countries severed diplomatic ties, South Korea sent a delegation of eight people, including former National Assembly Speaker Kim Jae-soon and Chung Il-kwon, to Taiwan on 15 September. In addition to expressing apologies, they also exchanged views on issues of common concern, such as the framework of bilateral relations. However, due to concerns about the PRC, South Korea insisted that the newly established representative office should not use the name "Republic of China" and should only be named "Taipei". As a result, the two sides could not reach a specific agreement. Until the Taiwan–South Korea agreement was introduced, the former ROC embassy in South Korea, which had already closed, only temporarily maintained consular business in South Korea under the name of "Overseas Chinese Certificates and Documents Transfer Service Center".

In February 1993, Roh Tae-woo's presidential term ended, and the government of President Kim Young-sam, which was friendly with Taiwan, continued to negotiate with Taiwan. The gap in their understanding of common issues narrowed. On 23 July 1993, after a year of negotiations, the two sides signed the Agreement on Rebuilding New Relations between the Two Countries, agreed to establish representative offices in each other's countries, and resumed bilateral cooperation in trade, culture and academic exchanges. On 25 November 1993, the South Korean side established the Korean Mission in Taipei, while the Taiwan side opened the Taipei Mission in Seoul on 25 January 1994, as an institution representing the two governments to promote substantive bilateral exchanges and cooperation.

On 21 September 1999, the Jiji earthquake struck central Taiwan. South Korea sent a 16-person national-level rescue team to Taiwan. On 24 September, four days after the earthquake, a Swiss rescue team discovered signs of life in the ruins of the collapsed "Taichung Dynasty" building in Dali City, Taichung County. They worked hard to dig and finally rescued 6-year-old Zhang Jinghong, who had been trapped for 87 hours, by Choi Jin-jong, the rescue captain of the South Korean National Search and Rescue Team, in the evening. The national television station broadcast this scene live. In addition, South Korea also sent a cargo plane of Korean Air, the national airline, carrying 30 tons of disaster relief supplies. It arrived at Chiang Kai-shek International Airport (now Taoyuan International Airport) on 1 October. This was the first South Korean plane to arrive in Taiwan after the suspension of flights between Taiwan and South Korea in 1992.

In December 2002, regular charter flights were launched between Taiwan and South Korea, and air traffic was restored to a limited extent. In mid-2004, Taiwanese government and the South Korean government reached an agreement to restore regular air routes between Taiwan and South Korea. The agreement was officially implemented on 1 March 2005, officially ending the 13-year suspension of air traffic after the severance of diplomatic relations between Taiwan and South Korea. In early 2005, the Taiwanese government established the Taipei Economic and Cultural Office, a consulate-level office, in Busan.

Influenced by South Korea’s foreign policy (emphasizing diplomatic relations with the United States and China, pursuing a balanced diplomacy, especially in its policy toward North Korea), the South Korean government does not attach great importance to exchanges with Taiwan. South Korea’s representative to Taiwan, Chung Sang-ki, once wrote to the South Korean newspaper The Chosun Ilbo, urging the government to pay attention to bilateral relations.
