= Kim Jong-hwan =

Kim Jong-hwan may refer to:

- Kim Jong-hwan (singer)
- Kim Jong-hwan (military officer)
