= President Roh =

President Roh may refer to:

- Roh Tae-woo (1932–2021), 13th president of South Korea
- Roh Moo-hyun (1946–2009), 16th president of South Korea
