= Ministry of Home Affairs (South Korea) =

1948–1998 South Korean government agency

Agency overview
- Formed: November 4, 1948
- Dissolved: February 28, 1998
- Superseding agency: Ministry of the Interior

Korean name
- Hangul: 내무부
- Hanja: 內務部
- RR: Naemubu
- MR: Naemubu

The Ministry of Home Affairs (MOHA; Korean: 내무부) was a cabinet-level ministry of the South Korean government. It was one of eleven initial cabinet-level ministries created with the establishment of the South Korean government and the passage of the Government Organization Act in 1948. In February 1998, the Ministry of Home Affairs was merged with the Ministry of Government Administration to create the Ministry of the Interior.

The Ministry of Home Affairs oversaw a wide range of internal affairs, including regional administration, public security, civil defense, and firefighting.

== Administration and History ==
On July 17, 1948, on the same day the South Korean Constitution was announced, the Constituent National Assembly of the Republic of Korea ratified the Government Organization Act as its first legislative act. The Government Organization Act provided for the creation of 11 cabinet-level ministries, including the Ministry of Home Affairs. Succeeding the United States Army Military Government in Korea, the government of the Republic of Korea was officially promulgated on August 15, 1948, and the Ministry of Home Affairs was formally organized on November 4 of the same year.

The Ministry of Home Affairs was headed by a Minister of Home Affairs, who was also a member of the State Council. Three bureaus—the Bureau of Public Safety (치안국), the Bureau of Local Administration (지방국), and the Bureau of Construction (건설국)—consisted of the ministry at the time of its founding. The powers and jurisdiction of the ministry shifted vastly following the various reforms of the South Korean government. Affiliated agencies of the ministry included various organizations related to public security, including the Korean National Police University, the National Fire Service Academy, and the National Forensic Service.

In February 1998, the Kim Dae-jung administration finalized its plans to combine the Ministry of Home Affairs and the Ministry of Government Administration as part of its policies to strengthen local government. On February 28, the two agencies merged together to form the Ministry of the Interior following the National Assembly's amendment to the Government Organization Act.

== List of Ministers ==
No.	Portrait	Name	Term of Office			President
No.	Portrait	Name	Took Office	Left Office	Time in Office	President
1		Yun Chi-young 윤치영 尹致暎	2 August 1948	22 December 1948	142 days	Syngman Rhee
2		Shin Song-mo 신성모 申性模	23 December 1948	20 March 1949	87 days	Syngman Rhee
3		Kim Hyo-suk 김효석 金孝錫	21 March 1949	6 February 1950	322 days	Syngman Rhee
4		Paik Sung-wook 백성욱 白性郁	7 February 1950	16 July 1950	159 days	Syngman Rhee
5		Chough Pyung-ok 조병옥 趙炳玉	17 July 1950	6 May 1951	293 days	Syngman Rhee
6		Lee Soon-yong 이순용 李淳鎔	7 May 1951	12 January 1952	250 days	Syngman Rhee
-		Chang Seok-yoon 장석윤 張錫潤	17 January 1952	5 February 1952	19 days	Syngman Rhee
7		Chang Seok-yoon 장석윤 張錫潤	6 February 1952	23 May 1952	107 days	Syngman Rhee
8		Lee Beom-seok 이범석 李範奭	24 May 1952	22 July 1952	59 days	Syngman Rhee
9		Kim Tae-sun 김태선 金泰善	24 July 1952	28 August 1952	35 days	Syngman Rhee
10		Jin Heon-sik 진헌식 陳憲植	29 August 1952	9 September 1953	1 year, 11 days	Syngman Rhee
-		Hwang Ho-hyon 황호현 黃虎鉉	10 September 1953	19 September 1953	9 days	Syngman Rhee
11		Baek Han-seong 백한성 白漢成	19 September 1953	21 April 1955	1 year, 214 days	Syngman Rhee
12		Kim Hyung-geun 김형근 金亨根	22 April 1955	20 May 1956	1 year, 28 days	Syngman Rhee
13		Lee Ik-heung 이익흥 李益興	21 May 1956	3 February 1957	258 days	Syngman Rhee
14		Jang Gyeong-geun 장경근 張璟根	4 February 1957	25 September 1957	233 days	Syngman Rhee
15		Lee Geun-jik 이근직 李根直	26 September 1957	16 June 1958	263 days	Syngman Rhee
16		Min Byung-ki 민병기 閔丙祺	17 June 1958	26 August 1958	70 days	Syngman Rhee
17		Kim Il-hwan 김일환 金一煥	27 August 1958	19 March 1959	204 days	Syngman Rhee
18		Choi In-Kyu 최인규 崔仁圭	20 March 1959	22 March 1960	1 year, 2 days	Syngman Rhee
19		Hong Jin-ki 홍진기 洪璡基	23 March 1960	24 April 1960	32 days	Syngman Rhee
20		Lee Ho 이호 李澔	25 April 1960	22 August 1960	119 days	Syngman Rhee
20		Lee Ho 이호 李澔	25 April 1960	22 August 1960	119 days	Yun Po-sun
21		Hong Ik-pyo 홍익표 洪翼杓	23 August 1960	11 September 1960	19 days	Yun Po-sun
22		Lee Sang-cheol 이상철 李相喆	12 September 1960	12 October 1960	30 days	Yun Po-sun
23		Hyeon Suk-ho 현석호 玄錫虎	13 October 1960	19 November 1960	37 days	Yun Po-sun
24		Shin Hyun-don 신현돈 申鉉燉	20 November 1960	2 May 1961	163 days	Yun Po-sun
25		Cho Jae-cheon 조재천 曺在千	3 May 1961	19 May 1961	16 days	Yun Po-sun
26		Han Shin 한신 韓信	20 May 1961	14 October 1962	1 year, 147 days	Yun Po-sun
26		Han Shin 한신 韓信	20 May 1961	14 October 1962	1 year, 147 days	Park Chung Hee (acting)
27		Park Kyong-won 박경원 朴璟遠	15 October 1962	23 November 1963	1 year, 39 days	Park Chung Hee (acting)
-		Lee Gye-soon 이계순 李啓純	23 November 1963	16 December 1963	23 days	Park Chung Hee (acting)
28		Um Min-young 엄민영 嚴敏永	17 December 1963	10 May 1964	145 days	Park Chung Hee
29		Yang Chan-woo 양찬우 楊燦宇	11 May 1964	14 April 1966	1 year, 338 days	Park Chung Hee
30		Um Min-young 엄민영 嚴敏永	15 April 1966	29 June 1967	1 year, 75 days	Park Chung Hee
31		Lee Ho 이호 李澔	30 June 1967	20 May 1968	325 days	Park Chung Hee
32		Park Kyong-won 박경원 朴璟遠	21 May 1968	3 June 1971	3 years, 13 days	Park Chung Hee
33		Oh Chi-sung 오치성 吳致成	4 June 1971	6 October 1971	124 days	Park Chung Hee
34		Kim Hyun-ok 김현옥 金玄玉	7 October 1971	2 December 1973	2 years, 56 days	Park Chung Hee
35		Hong Sung-chul 홍성철 洪性澈	3 December 1973	20 August 1974	260 days	Park Chung Hee
36		Park Kyong-won 박경원 朴璟遠	21 August 1974	18 December 1975	1 year, 119 days	Park Chung Hee
37		Kim Chi-yeol 김치열 金致烈	19 December 1975	21 December 1978	3 years, 2 days	Park Chung Hee
38		Koo Ja-chun 구자춘 具滋春	22 December 1978	14 December 1979	357 days	Park Chung Hee
38		Koo Ja-chun 구자춘 具滋春	22 December 1978	14 December 1979	357 days	Choi Kyu-hah
39		Kim Jong-hwan 김종환 金鍾煥	15 December 1979	2 September 1980	262 days	Choi Kyu-hah
39		Kim Jong-hwan 김종환 金鍾煥	15 December 1979	2 September 1980	262 days	Chun Doo-hwan
40		Suh Chung-hwa 서정화 徐廷和	3 September 1980	27 April 1982	1 year, 236 days	Chun Doo-hwan
41		Roh Tae-woo 노태우 盧泰愚	28 April 1982	6 July 1983	1 year, 69 days	Chun Doo-hwan
42		Joo Young-bok 주영복 周永福	7 July 1983	18 February 1985	1 year, 226 days	Chun Doo-hwan
43		Chung Suk-mo 정석모 鄭石謨	19 February 1985	26 August 1986	1 year, 188 days	Chun Doo-hwan
44		Kim Chong-hoh 김종호 金宗鎬	27 August 1986	20 January 1987	146 days	Chun Doo-hwan
45		Chung Ho-yong 정호용 鄭鎬溶	21 January 1987	25 May 1987	124 days	Chun Doo-hwan
46		Goh Kun 고건 高建	26 May 1987	13 July 1987	48 days	Chun Doo-hwan
47		Jeong Gwan-yong 정관용 鄭寬溶	14 July 1987	13 September 1987	61 days	Chun Doo-hwan
48		Lee Sang-hee 이상희 李相熙	14 September 1987	24 February 1988	163 days	Chun Doo-hwan
49		Lee Sang-hee 이상희 李相熙	25 February 1988	6 May 1988	71 days	Roh Tae-woo
50		Lee Choon-koo 이춘구 李春九	7 May 1988	4 December 1988	211 days	Roh Tae-woo
51		Lee Han-dong 이한동 李漢東	5 December 1988	18 July 1989	225 days	Roh Tae-woo
52		Kim Tae-ho 김태호 金泰鎬	19 July 1989	18 March 1990	242 days	Roh Tae-woo
53		Ahn Eung-mo 안응모 安應模	19 March 1990	28 April 1991	1 year, 40 days	Roh Tae-woo
54		Lee Sang-yun 이상연 李相淵	29 April 1991	30 March 1992	336 days	Roh Tae-woo
55		Lee Dong-ho 이동호 李同浩	31 March 1992	8 October 1992	191 days	Roh Tae-woo
56		Paik Gwang-hyun 백광현 白光鉉	9 October 1992	25 February 1993	139 days	Roh Tae-woo
57		Lee Hae-gu 이해구 李海龜	26 February 1993	21 December 1993	298 days	Kim Young-sam
58		Choi Hyung-woo 최형우 崔炯佑	22 December 1993	23 December 1994	1 year, 1 day	Kim Young-sam
59		Kim Yong-tae 김용태 金瑢泰	24 December 1994	20 December 1995	361 days	Kim Young-sam
60		Kim Woo-seok 김우석 金佑錫	21 December 1995	12 February 1997	1 year, 53 days	Kim Young-sam
61		Suh Chung-hwa 서정화 徐廷和	13 February 1997	5 March 1997	20 days	Kim Young-sam
62		Kang Woon-tae 강운태 姜雲太	6 March 1997	5 August 1997	152 days	Kim Young-sam
63		Cho Hae-nyoung 조해녕 曺海寧	6 August 1997	2 March 1998	208 days	Kim Young-sam
