= Kim Yong-shik =

South Korean diplomat (1913–1995)

- 김용식
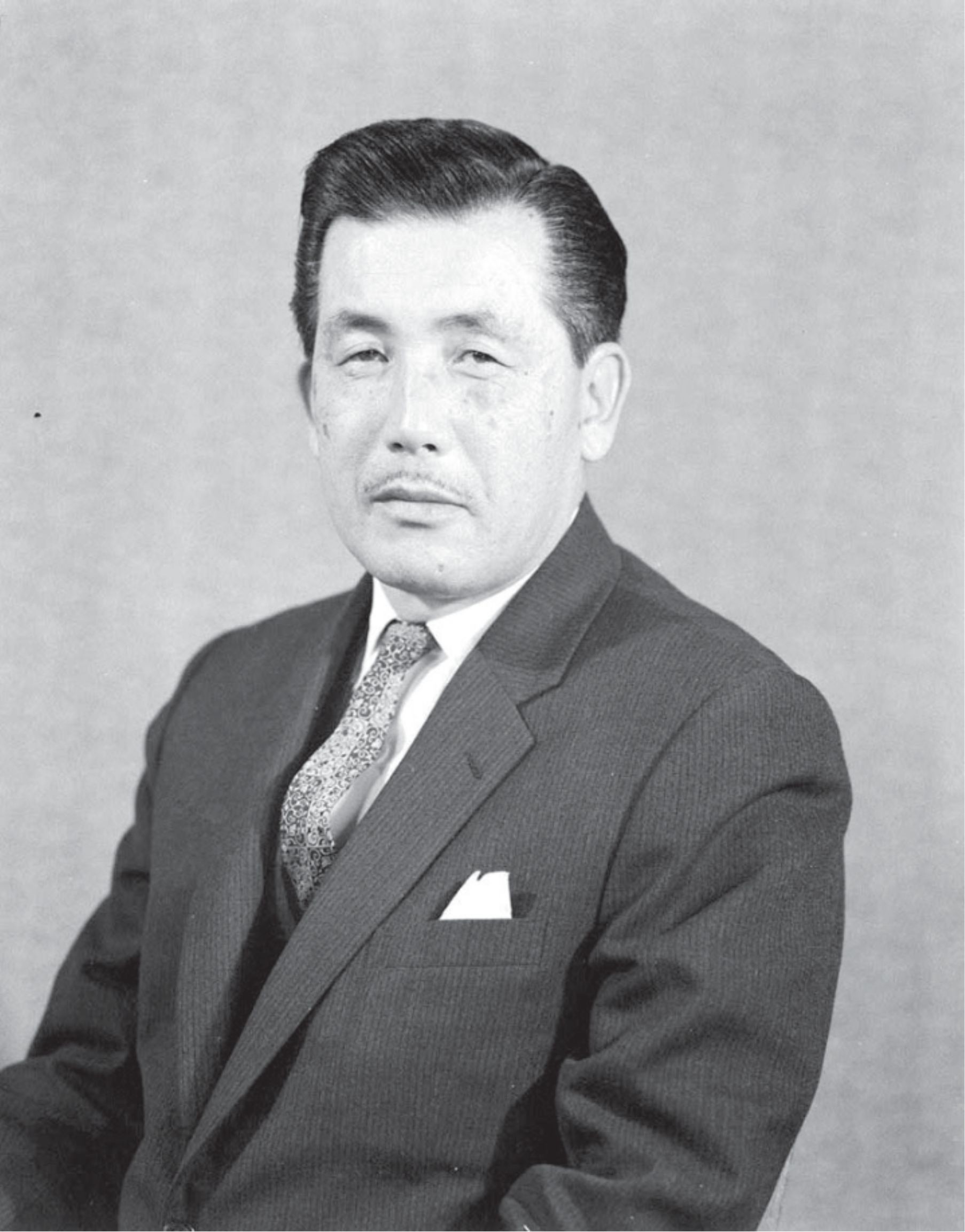

President of the Seoul Olympic Organizing Committee
- In office November 2, 1981 – July 11, 1983
- IOC President: Juan Antonio Samaranch
- Succeeded by: Roh Tae-woo

Chair of the Seoul Olympic Organizing Committee
- In office November 2, 1981 – July 11, 1983
- Preceded by: Committee established
- Succeeded by: Roh Tae-woo

South Korean Ambassador to the United States
- In office 1977–1981
- President: Park Chung Hee; Choi Kyu-hah; Chun Doo-hwan
- Preceded by: Hahm Pyong-choon
- Succeeded by: Lew Byong-hion

Personal details
- Born: 11 November 1913 Tongyeong, Korea, Empire of Japan
- Died: 31 March 1995 (aged 81) Seoul, South Korea
- Occupation: Lawyer, politician

Korean name
- Hangul: 김용식
- Hanja: 金溶植
- RR: Gim Yongsik
- MR: Kim Yongsik

Kim Yong-shik (Korean: 김용식; November 11, 1913 – March 31, 1995) was a South Korean lawyer and diplomat.

== Personal life ==
Kim's younger brother was Korean author Kim Yong-ik. He graduated from the Law College of Chuo University in Tokyo in 1937.

== Career ==
He twice served as Foreign Minister of South Korea (in 1962 and from 1971 to 1973) and also held the posts of National Unification Minister (1973–1974) and Minister without Portfolio (1963). Kim's diplomatic career began with posts as Consul in Hong Kong and Honolulu, and progressed with assignments as Minister of the South Korean embassies to Japan (1951–1957) and France (May 16, 1957 – September 10, 1958), and then Minister with the Korean mission in Geneva. He then became Ambassador to Great Britain, concurrently to the Scandinavian countries (1961–1962), to the Philippines (1962–1963), to the United Nations, concurrently Canada (1964–1970), and to the United States (1977–1981). He was also special assistant to the President of the Republic of Korea for Foreign Affairs (1970–1971).

Upon his retirement from the foreign service, Kim took the posts of President of the Republic of Korea National Red Cross, Chairman of the Committee for Promotion of Home Visits by Overseas Koreans, Chairman of the Committee for Commemoration of the 100th Anniversary of Korean US Relations.

Diplomatic posts
Preceded by Ham Byeong-chun	Ambassador of South Korea to the United States; 1977–1981	Succeeded by Lew Byong-hion
Sporting positions
Preceded by N/R	President of Organizing Committee for Summer Olympic Games; 1981–1983	Succeeded by (South Korea) Roh Tae-woo
