= Yongsan (constituency) =

Constituency in Seoul, South Korea

- Single-member constituency for the National Assembly
- Location of the constituency
- District(s): Yongsan District
- Region: Seoul
- Electorate: 203,233 (2020)

Current constituency
- Created: 1988
- Seats: 1
- Party: People Power Party
- Member(s): Kwon Young-se
- Council constituency: Yongsan 1st district Yongsan 2nd district
- Created from: Mapo–Yongsan

Yongsan (Korean: 용산구) is a constituency of the National Assembly of South Korea. The constituency only consists of the Yongsan District, Seoul. As of 2020, 203,233 eligible voters were registered in the constituency.

== History ==
Since its creation in 1988, the constituency has been represented by a series of influential politicians due to Yongsan's geographical and political importance. The constituency was won by Suh Chung-hwa in the 1988, 1992, and 1996 legislative elections. Suh had previously served as the Governor of South Chungcheong Province and the Minister of the Interior of the Republic of Korea.

The constituency elected former Head of the Yongsan District Office Seol Song-woong of the Millennium Democratic Party in the 2000 South Korean legislative election, marking the first time the constituency was won by a member of a liberal political party. However, the constituency elected Chin Young of the conservative Grand National Party (later known as the Saenuri Party) in the 2004, 2008, and 2012 legislative elections. Chin served as the Minister of Health and Welfare under the Park Geun-hye administration. Although initially elected as conservative, Chin switched his party affiliation to the liberal Democratic Party ahead of the 2016 legislative election due to his anti-Park Geun-hye stances which had formed as a result of disagreements on senior pension legislation while serving as the Minister of Health and Welfare. Despite this, Chin successfully won re-election proving Yongsan to be a competitive constituency for both liberal and conservative parties. Yongsan once again proved to be a competitive constituency when Kwon Young-se of the conservative United Future Party was elected by a difference of 890 votes from the Democratic Party candidate in the 2020 South Korean legislative election.

== Boundaries ==
The constituency includes the neighborhoods of Huam-dong, Namyeong-dong, Cheongpa-dong, Hyochang-dong, Yongmun-dong, Hannam-dong, Bogwang-dong, Hangangno-dong, Seobinggo-dong, Ichon-dong, Wonhyoro-dong, Itaewon-dong, and parts of Yongsan-dong.

== List of members of the National Assembly ==
Election	Member	Party	Dates	Notes
1988	Suh Chung-hwa	Democratic Justice	1988–2000	Minister of Home Affairs (1980–1982, 1997)
1992	Suh Chung-hwa	Democratic Liberal	1988–2000	Minister of Home Affairs (1980–1982, 1997)
1996	Suh Chung-hwa	New Korea	1988–2000	Minister of Home Affairs (1980–1982, 1997)
2000	Seol Song-woong	Millennium Democratic	2000–2004	Mayor of Yongsan (1995–1998)
2004	Chin Young	Grand National	2004–2020	Minister of Health and Welfare (2013); Minister of the Interior and Safety (2019–2020)
2008	Chin Young	Grand National	2004–2020	Minister of Health and Welfare (2013); Minister of the Interior and Safety (2019–2020)
2012	Chin Young	Saenuri	2004–2020	Minister of Health and Welfare (2013); Minister of the Interior and Safety (2019–2020)
2016	Chin Young	Democratic	2004–2020	Minister of Health and Welfare (2013); Minister of the Interior and Safety (2019–2020)
2020	Kwon Young-se	United Future	2020–present	South Korean Ambassador to China (2013–2015); Minister of Unification (2022–2024)
2024	Kwon Young-se	People Power	2020–present	South Korean Ambassador to China (2013–2015); Minister of Unification (2022–2024)

== Election results ==
=== 2024 ===
Legislative Election 2024: Yongsan
Party	Candidate	Votes	%	±%
People Power	Kwon Young-se	66,583	51.77	▲3.97
Democratic	Kang Tae-woong	60,473	47.02	▼0.12
Independent	Kim Jeong-hyeon	1,536	1.19	new
Rejected ballots		1,651	–	
Turnout		130,243	68.91	▲2.46
Registered electors		188,998		
People Power hold		Swing		

=== 2020 ===
Legislative Election 2020: Yongsan
Party	Candidate	Votes	%	±%
United Future	Kwon Young-se	63,891	47.8	+7.9
Democratic	Kang Tae-woong	63,001	47.1	+4.3
Justice	Jeong Youn-wook	4,251	3.1	+0.3
Minsaeng	Kwon Hyeok-moon	1,311	1.0	new
Minjung	Kim Eun-hee	648	0.5	−0.2
National Revolutionary Dividends	Kim Hee-jeon	541	0.4	new
Rejected ballots		1,400	–	–
Turnout		135,043	66.5	+8.8
Registered electors		203,233		
United Future gain from Democratic		Swing		

=== 2016 ===
Legislative Election 2016: Yongsan
Party	Candidate	Votes	%	±%
Democratic	Chin Young	48,965	42.8	−9.6
Saenuri	Hwang Chun-ja	45,691	39.9	−12.5
People's	Kwak Tae-won	15,805	13.8	new
Justice	Jeong Youn-wook	3,161	2.8	new
People's United	Lee So-young	838	0.7	new
Rejected ballots		1,120	–	–
Turnout		115,580	57.7	+5.7
Registered electors		200,224		
Democratic gain from Saenuri		Swing		

=== 2012 ===
Legislative Election 2012: Yongsan
Party	Candidate	Votes	%	±%
Saenuri	Chin Young	56,067	52.4	−5.6
Democratic United	Cho Soon-yong	49,083	45.9	+16.5
Nations’ Happiness	Lee Hee-jung	1,776	1.7	new
Rejected ballots		1,141	–	–
Turnout		107,681	52.0	+9.0
Registered electors		207,240		
Saenuri hold		Swing		

=== 2008 ===
Legislative Election 2008: Yongsan
Party	Candidate	Votes	%	±%
Grand National	Chin Young	47,533	58.0	+12.0
Democratic	Sung Jang-hyun	24,077	29.4	new
Democratic Labor	Kim Jong-min	4,567	5.6	+0.7
Liberty Forward	Lee In-sook	3,984	4.9	new
Family Federation	Kim Man-ho	1,737	2.1	new
Rejected ballots		700	–	–
Turnout		82,598	43.0	−18.2
Registered electors		192,033		
Grand National hold		Swing		

=== 2004 ===
Legislative Election 2004: Yongsan
Party	Candidate	Votes	%	±%
Grand National	Chin Young	51,025	46.0	+1.4
Uri	Kim Jinai	43,915	39.6	new
Millennium Democratic	Sung Jang-hyun	9,570	8.6	−36.2
Democratic Labor	Jeong Youn-wook	5,467	4.9	+2.8
United Liberal Democrats	Lee Yong-ju	849	0.8	−4.4
Rejected ballots		770	–	–
Turnout		111,596	61.2	+8.2
Registered electors		182,403		
Grand National gain from Millennium Democratic		Swing		

=== 2000 ===
Legislative Election 2000: Yongsan
Party	Candidate	Votes	%	±%
Millennium Democratic	Seol Song-woong	42,849	44.8	+12.2
Grand National	Chin Young	42,736	44.6	+8.2
United Liberal Democrats	Lee Gil-beom	4,937	5.2	−2.3
Senior Progressive	Lee Kwang-hee	2,201	2.3	new
Democratic Labor	Lee Ho-young	2,045	2.1	new
Democratic People's	Song Jae-young	910	1.0	new
Rejected ballots		894	–	–
Turnout		96,572	53.0	−7.1
Registered electors		182,095		
Millennium Democratic gain from Grand National		Swing		

=== 1996 ===
Legislative Election 1996: Yongsan
Party	Candidate	Votes	%	±%
New Korea	Suh Chung-hwa	41,092	36.4	−0.3
National Congress	Oh Yoo-bang	36,769	32.6	new
Democratic	Kang Chang-sung	24,023	21.3	−6.9
United Liberal Democrats	Kim Jae-young	8,496	7.5	new
Nonpartisan People's Union	Jeong Han-sung	1,436	1.3	new
Independent	Lee Chun-hyung	1,081	1.0	new
Rejected ballots		1,616	–	–
Turnout		114,513	60.3	−8.9
Registered electors		189,773		
New Korea hold		Swing		

=== 1992 ===
Legislative Election 1992: Yongsan
Party	Candidate	Votes	%	±%
Democratic Liberal	Suh Chung-hwa	49,977	36.7	+3.8
Democratic	Han Young-ae	39,556	28.2	new
Reunification National Party	Bong Doo-wan	32,177	23.0	new
Independent	Seol Song-woong	12,802	9.1	new
New Political Reform	Kim Dong-ju	3,733	2.7	new
Independent	Eom Geum-ja	996	0.7	new
Independent	Jeong Han-sung	927	0.7	new
Rejected ballots		1,640	–	–
Turnout		141,808	69.0	−1.5
Registered electors		205,488		
Democratic Liberal hold		Swing		

=== 1988 ===
Legislative Election 1988: Yongsan
Party	Candidate	Votes	%	±%
Democratic Justice	Suh Chung-hwa	48,103	32.9	new
Peace Democratic	Han Young-ae	34,364	23.5	new
Reunification Democratic	Kim Jae-young	33,691	23.0	new
New Democratic Republican	Seol Song-woong	25,721	17.6	new
One National Democratic	Jeong Moo-hyung	3,779	2.6	new
Our Justice	Lee Bu-kyu	599	0.4	new
Rejected ballots		1,493	–	–
Turnout		147,750	70.5	–
Registered electors		209,456		
Democratic Justice win (new seat)				

== See also ==
- List of constituencies of the National Assembly of South Korea
