= Kwon Young-se =

South Korean politician (born 1959)

The Honourable Kwon Young-se MP
- 권영세
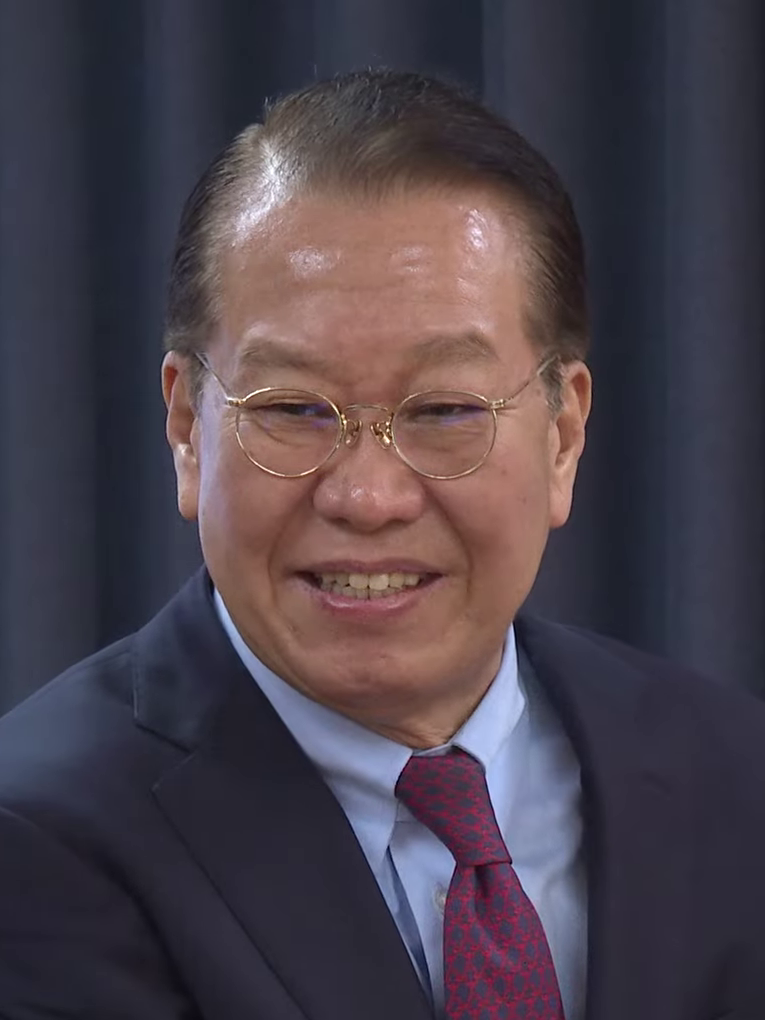
- Kwon in 2025

Chairman of the Emergency Response Committee of the People's Power Party
- Ad Interim
- In office 30 December 2024 – 10 May 2025
- Preceded by: Kweon Seong-dong (acting)
- Succeeded by: Kweon Seong-dong (acting); Kim Yong-tae

Minister of Unification
- In office 16 May 2022 – 28 July 2023
- President: Yoon Suk Yeol
- Prime Minister: Choo Kyung-ho (acting); Han Duck-soo
- Preceded by: Lee In-young
- Succeeded by: Kim Yung-ho

Member of the National Assembly
- Incumbent
- Assumed office 30 May 2020
- Preceded by: Chin Young
- Constituency: Yongsan (Seoul)
- In office 8 August 2002 – 29 May 2012
- Preceded by: Kim Min-seok
- Succeeded by: Shin Kyoung-min
- Constituency: Yeongdeungpo B (Seoul)

South Korean Ambassador to China
- In office 1 June 2013 – 26 March 2015
- President: Park Geun-hye
- Preceded by: Lee Kyu-hyung
- Succeeded by: Kim Jang-soo

Personal details
- Born: 1 April 1959 (age 67) Seoul, South Korea
- Party: People Power
- Education: Seoul National University (LLB, LLM); Harvard University (MPA)

Military service
- Allegiance: South Korea
- Branch/service: Republic of Korea Air Force
- Years of service: 1986–1989
- Rank: Captain (Korean: 대위)
- Unit: Military advocate

Korean name
- Hangul: 권영세
- Hanja: 權寧世
- RR: Gwon Yeongse
- MR: Kwŏn Yŏngse

Kwon Young-se (Korean: 권영세; born 1 April 1959) is a South Korean politician and diplomat who is currently serving as the member for Yongsan in the National Assembly. A member of the People Power Party, he is often described as a moderate conservative within his party. He previously served in the National Assembly as the member for Yeongdeungpo B from 2002 to 2012 and as the minister of unification from 2022 to 2023.

== Early life ==
Kwon Yeong-se was born on February 24, 1959 in Yongsan-gu, Seoul. He graduated from the Seoul National University School of Law and passed his bar examination in 1983. He later received his MPA from the Harvard Kennedy School.

== Election results ==
Year	Elections	Constituency	Political party	Votes (%)	Results
2002	2002 By-election	Yeongdeungpo B (Seoul)	GNP	20,976 (54.91%)	Won
2004	17th National Assembly General Election	Yeongdeungpo B (Seoul)	GNP	41,432 (43.39%)	Won
2008	18th National Assembly General Election	Yeongdeungpo B (Seoul)	GNP	38,537 (57.57%)	Won
2012	19th National Assembly General Election	Yeongdeungpo B (Seoul)	Saenuri	40,950 (47.39%)	Defeated (2nd)
2016	20th National Assembly General Election	Yeongdeungpo B (Seoul)	Saenuri	32,341 (37.70%)	Defeated (2nd)
2020	21st National Assembly General Election	Yongsan (Seoul)	UFP	63,891 (47.80%)	Won
2024	22nd National Assembly General Election	Yongsan (Seoul)	PPP	66,583 (51.77%)	Won

== Career ==
Prior to becoming a politician, Kwon worked as a public prosecutor. He entered politics when he was nominated as the Grand National Party's candidate for Yeongdeungpo B in the 2002 South Korean by-elections after former member Kim Min-seok's resignation in order to run in the Seoul Mayoral election. Kwon was elected with 54.9% of the vote in the election. He was re-elected in his constituency in the 2004 election and the 2008 election, but failed to be re-elected in the 2012 election.

While not a member of the National Assembly, he actively supported Park Geun-hye's campaign in the 2012 South Korean presidential election. He was then appointed by President Park Geun-hye to serve as South Korea's Ambassador to China in early 2013. He returned to South Korea in March 2015 and was succeeded by Kim Jang-soo.

Upon his return to South Korea, he once again ran as the Saenuri Party's candidate for the Yeongdeungpo B constituency in the 2016 South Korean legislative election. However, he was defeated by incumbent Shin Kyoung-min.

In the 2020 South Korean legislative election, Kwon narrowly defeated Democratic candidate Kang Tae-woong in the Yongsan constituency race, returning to the National Assembly as a member after eight years.
