= Kim Jong-hwan (military officer) =

South Korean military officer and politician (1923–2022)

Minister of Home Affairs
- In office December 14, 1979 – September 2, 1980
- President: Choi Kyu-hah; Park Choong-hoon; Chun Doo-hwan
- Prime Minister: Shin Hyun-hwak; Park Choong-hoon; Nam Duck-woo
- Leader: Chun Doo-hwan
- Preceded by: Koo Ja-choon
- Succeeded by: Seo Jeong-hwa

15th Chairman of the Joint Chiefs of Staff
- In office December 29, 1975 – December 15, 1979
- President: Park Chung-Hee; Choi Kyu-hah
- Prime Minister: Kim Jong-pil; Choi Kyu-hah
- Leader: Chun Doo-hwan
- Preceded by: Roh Jae-hyun
- Succeeded by: Lew Byong-hyun

Personal details
- Born: 2 September 1923 Keiki Province, Korea, Empire of Japan
- Died: 23 August 2022 (aged 98)
- Party: Independent
- Education: Korea Military Academy; Republic of Korea Army Infantry School; Republic of Korea Army College; Korea National Defense University
- Occupation: Military officer, Politician
- Awards: Eulji Order of Military Merit; Chungmu Order of Military Merit; Hwarang Order of Military Merit; Tongil Medal

Military service
- Allegiance: South Korea
- Rank: Sowi in September 1947
- Commands: II Corps; 3rd Field Army

Korean name
- Hangul: 김종환
- RR: Gim Jonghwan
- MR: Kim Chonghwan

Kim Jong-hwan (Korean: 김종환; 2 September 1923 – 23 August 2022) was a South Korean military officer and politician. An independent, he served as Minister of Home Affairs from 1979 to 1980, whilst during his military career he served as Chairman of the Joint Chiefs of Staff from December 1975 until December 1979.

Kim died on 23 August 2022, at the age of 98.
