= Chin Young =

South Korean politician (born 1950)

The Honourable Chin Young
- 진영

Minister of the Interior and Safety
- In office 6 April 2019 – 24 December 2020
- President: Moon Jae-in
- Prime Minister: Lee Nak-yon; Chung Sye-kyun
- Preceded by: Kim Boo-kyum
- Succeeded by: Jeon Hae-cheol

Member of the National Assembly
- In office 30 May 2004 – 29 May 2020
- Preceded by: Seol Song-ung
- Succeeded by: Kwon Young-se
- Constituency: Yongsan (Seoul)

Minister of Health and Welfare
- In office 11 March 2013 – 30 September 2013
- President: Park Geun-hye
- Prime Minister: Chung Hong-won
- Preceded by: Im Chae-min
- Succeeded by: Moon Hyung-pyo

Personal details
- Born: 23 October 1950 (age 76) Damyang County, South Jeolla Province, South Korea
- Party: Saenuri Party (until 2016); Democratic Party of Korea (2016–present)
- Education: Seoul National University; University of Washington
- Occupation: Lawyer
- Website: www.chinyoung.kr

- Chin Young
- Hangul: 진영
- Hanja: 陳永
- RR: Jin Yeong
- MR: Chin Yŏng

Chin Young (Korean: 진영; born 23 October 1950) is a South Korean politician in the liberal Democratic Party of Korea, and a former member of the National Assembly representing Yongsan, Seoul. He was formerly a member of the conservative Saenuri Party, and served as the first Minister of Health and Welfare in the Park Geun-hye administration from March to September 2013.

== Early life and career ==
Chin studied law as an undergraduate at Seoul National University, graduating in 1975, and attained a master's from the University of Washington School of Law in 1984. He served as a judge on the Seoul Southern District Court from 1980 to 1981, and worked as a private lawyer from 1981 to 2007.

== Political career ==
=== National Assembly (Saenuri Party, 2004–2016) ===
Chin was first elected to the 17th National Assembly in 2004. He was re-elected twice more in 2008 and 2012 as a member of the conservative Saenuri Party.

=== Minister of Health and Welfare (2013) ===
Chin was the Minister of Health and Welfare in Park Geun-hye administration. Having previously been Park's chief secretary, he was considered a key ally of Park at the time, and advocated an expansion of government welfare spending. He resigned six months after his appointment due to the administration's refusal to fulfil an election pledge to provide an additional monthly allowance for elderly citizens. Later, in May 2014, Chin voiced his disapproval that he had not been allowed "to leave quietly".

=== National Assembly (Minjoo Party, 2016–2020) ===
In March 2016, Chin was one of a number of Saenuri heavyweights who were denied party nominations for the April 13 parliamentary election. He left the party in response, and joined the opposition Minjoo Party. At a press conference with Minjoo leader Kim Chong-in announcing his defection, Chin stated that he "cherished true party politics, not party factionalism masterminded by a certain person", and that he had joined the Minjoo Party to "fight against authoritarianism to restore democracy". His comment was interpreted as an attack on Park Geun-hye. In the event, Chin was re-elected in Yongsan for his fourth legislative term in the 20th National Assembly, defeating Saenuri challenger Hwang Chun-ja.

== Election results ==
Year	Elections	Constituency	Political party	Votes (%)	Results
2000	16th National Assembly General Election	Yongsan (Seoul)	GNP	42,736 (44.66%)	Defeated (2nd)
2004	17th National Assembly General Election	Yongsan (Seoul)	GNP	51,025 (46.04%)	Won
2008	18th National Assembly General Election	Yongsan (Seoul)	GNP	47,533 (58.03%)	Won
2012	19th National Assembly General Election	Yongsan (Seoul)	Saenuri	56,067 (52.43%)	Won
2016	20th National Assembly General Election	Yongsan (Seoul)	Democratic	48,965 (42.77%)	Won
