= Suh Chung-hwa =

South Korean politician (1933–2024)

- 서정화

Minister of Home Affairs
- In office 13 February 1997 – 5 March 1997
- Preceded by: Kim Wooseok
- Succeeded by: Kang Woon-tae
- In office 2 September 1980 – 28 April 1982
- Preceded by: Kim Jong-hwan
- Succeeded by: Roh Tae-woo

Member of the National Assembly of South Korea for Yongsan
- In office 30 May 1988 – 29 May 2000
- Preceded by: Pong Tu-wan
- Succeeded by: Seol Song-woong

Governor of South Chungcheong Province
- In office 2 September 1974 – 12 January 1976
- Preceded by: Kim Su-hak
- Succeeded by: Jeong Seok-mo

Personal details
- Born: 4 March 1933 Tongyeong, Korea, Empire of Japan
- Died: 17 March 2024 (aged 91)
- Party: DJP; NKP; GNP
- Education: Republic of Korea Army Infantry School; Seoul National University; Korea National Defense University; Hanyang University
- Occupation: Military officer

Suh Chung-hwa (Korean: 서정화; 4 March 1933 – 17 March 2024) was a South Korean military officer and politician. A member of the Democratic Justice Party, the New Korea Party, and the Grand National Party, he served as Governor of South Chungcheong Province from 1974 to 1976, Minister of Home Affairs from 1980 to 1982. He resigned as Minister of Home Affairs after the Woo Bum-kon spree killings, and was replaced by Chun Doo-hwan's close friend, Roh Tae-woo. He would later serve again as Minister of Home Affairs from February to March 1997, and was a member of the National Assembly from 1988 to 2000.

Suh died on 17 March 2024, at the age of 91.

== Election results ==
Year	Elections	Constituency	Political party	Votes (%)	Results
1985	12th National Assembly General Election	National (7th)	DJP	7,040,477 (35.25%)	Elected
1988	13th National Assembly General Election	Yongsan (Seoul)	DJP	48,103 (32.88%)	Won
1992	14th National Assembly General Election	Yongsan (Seoul)	DLP	49,977 (35.65%)	Won
1996	15th National Assembly General Election	Yongsan (Seoul)	NKP	41,092 (36.39%)	Won
2000	16th National Assembly General Election	Proportional representation (6th)	GNP	7,365,359 (38.96%)	Elected
