= Roh Tae-woo =

President of South Korea from 1988 to 1993

- 노태우
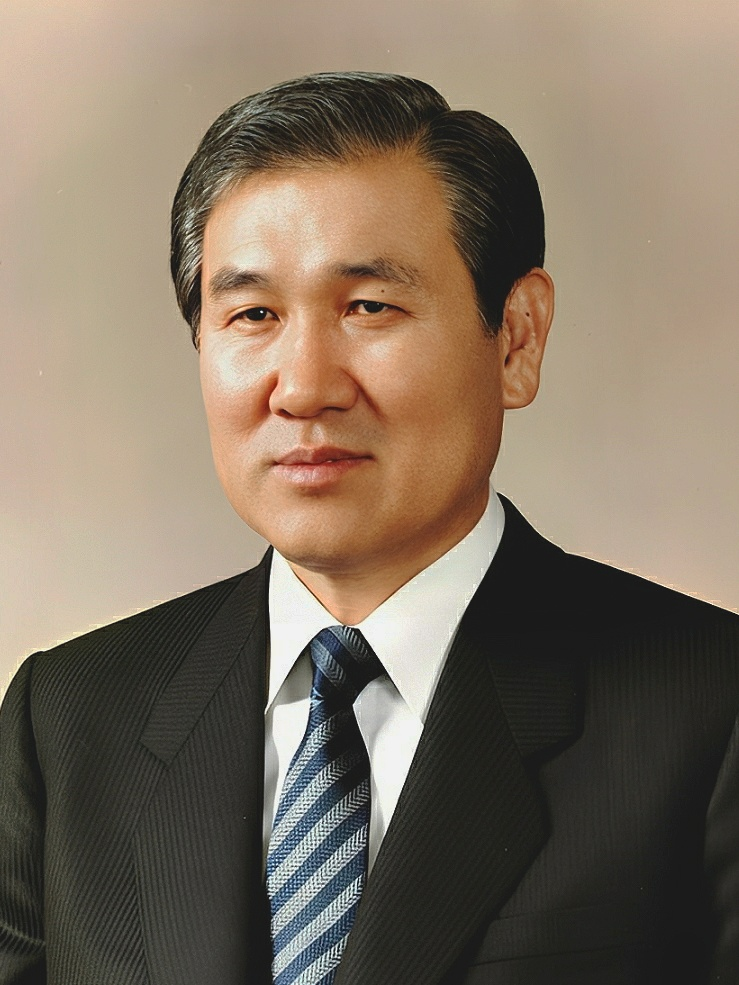
- Official portrait, c. 1988

6th President of South Korea
- In office 25 February 1988 – 24 February 1993
- Prime Minister: Lee Hyun-jae; Kang Young-hoon; Ro Jai-bong; Chung Won-shik; Hyun Soong-jong
- Preceded by: Chun Doo-hwan
- Succeeded by: Kim Young-sam

President of the Democratic Liberal Party
- In office 9 May 1990 – 28 August 1992
- Preceded by: Position established
- Succeeded by: Kim Young-sam

President of the Democratic Justice Party
- In office Acting: 10 July 1987 – 5 August 1987
- In office 5 August 1987 – 22 February 1990
- Preceded by: Chun Doo-hwan
- Succeeded by: Position abolished

President of the Seoul Olympic Organizing Committee
- In office 12 August 1984 – 7 May 1986
- IOC President: Juan Antonio Samaranch
- Preceded by: Peter Ueberroth
- Succeeded by: Park Seh-jik

Chair of the Seoul Olympic Organizing Committee
- In office 11 July 1983 – 7 May 1986
- Preceded by: Kim Yong-shik
- Succeeded by: Park Seh-jik

Minister of Home Affairs
- In office 28 April 1982 – 6 July 1983
- President: Chun Doo-hwan
- Preceded by: Suh Jong-hwa
- Succeeded by: Chu Yong-bok

Minister of Sports
- In office 20 March 1982 – 28 April 1982
- President: Chun Doo-hwan
- Preceded by: Position established
- Succeeded by: Lee Won-kyong

Personal details
- Born: 4 December 1932 (Note: At least one source says that Roh was born on 17 August 1932, making his age at death 89.) Taikyū, Tatsu-jō, Keishōhoku Province, Korea, Empire of Japan
- Died: 26 October 2021 (aged 88) Seoul, South Korea
- Resting place: Paju Unification Hill, Paju
- Party: Independent
- Other political affiliations: Democratic Justice (1980–1990); Democratic Liberal (1990–1992)
- Spouse: Kim Ok-suk (m. 1959)
- Children: Roh Soh-yeong (daughter); Roh Jae-heon (son)
- Education: Korea Military Academy (BS)

Military service
- Allegiance: South Korea
- Branch/service: Republic of Korea Army
- Years of service: 1950–1981
- Rank: General
- Commands: 9th Infantry Division, Capital Defense Command, Defense Security Command
- Battles/wars: Korean War; Vietnam War

Korean name
- Hangul: 노태우
- Hanja: 盧泰愚
- RR: No Taeu
- MR: No T'aeu

Art name
- Hangul: 용당
- Hanja: 庸堂
- RR: Yongdang
- MR: Yongdang

Roh Tae-woo (Korean: 노태우, pronounced [no.tʰɛ.u]; 4 December 1932 – 26 October 2021) was a South Korean army general and politician who served as the sixth President of South Korea from 1988 to 1993. In 1987, he became the first president to be directly elected under the current democratic constitution, which was promulgated after a lengthy period of indirect elections under military governments following the advent of the Yushin Constitution in 1972.

Born in Daegu, Roh graduated from Korea Military Academy in 1954 with a bachelor's degree in science and later worked in the military. He had known Chun Doo-hwan since high school whom he later helped rule South Korea. Rising steadily through the ranks, he saw action in the Vietnam War, and by 1979 he was a major general and commanded the White Horse Division. In that capacity, Roh played a key role in the December 1979 military coup that brought Chun to power, and supported Chun's violent crackdown of the Gwangju Uprising in 1980. Retiring from the army a year later, he held a series of ministerial posts in Chun's government.

In June 1987, Chun handpicked Roh as the candidate of the ruling Democratic Justice Party in the upcoming presidential election, which effectively handed Roh the presidency. The announcement triggered large pro-democracy rallies across the country that came to be known as the June Democratic Struggle. In response, Roh worked to distance himself from the Chun government and delivered the June 29 Declaration, promising a broad program of democratic reforms including the direct election of the president. He won the election in December with a plurality and was inaugurated on 25 February 1988.

As president, Roh reaffirmed his commitment to the continuing democratization of South Korean politics. He oversaw the merger of his Democratic Justice Party with Kim Young-sam's Reunification Democratic Party and Kim Jong-pil's New Democratic Republican Party to form the Democratic Liberal Party. Shortly after inauguration, he presided over the 1988 Summer Olympics in Seoul. In foreign affairs, Roh pursued the policy of Nordpolitik and established diplomatic ties with the Soviet Union and China. Relations with North Korea improved during his presidency, and the two Koreas were simultaneously admitted into the United Nations in 1991. Barred from running for a second term, Roh was succeeded by Kim Young-sam in 1993.

In 1996, Roh and Chun were convicted for corruption as well as their roles in the 1979 coup and the Gwangju massacre; Roh was sentenced to 17 years in prison while Chun was given a life sentence. Both were pardoned the following year by President Kim Young-sam on advice of incoming President-elect Kim Dae-jung. Roh died on 26 October 2021, at the age of 88.

== Early life and education ==
Roh was born on 4 December 1932 in Daegu. His ancestry can be traced from Jinan, capital of Shandong, China. He is a 16th generation descendant of Noh Sa-sin who was a civil minister and scholar during the early Joseon period. Noh Sa-sin is a 6th generation descendant of the late Goryeo period bureaucrat Noh Jin (노진; 盧稹). His father, a low-echelon civil officer in the district, died in a car accident when Roh was seven years old. With his uncle's help, Roh first enrolled at the Daegu Technical School but transferred to the local Kyeongbuk High School, where he was an above-average student. Roh befriended Chun Doo-hwan while in high school in Daegu.

== Military service ==
During the Korean War (1950–1953), Roh joined the South Korean army as an enlisted conscript in an artillery unit, alongside singer Song Hae. He was promoted to sergeant of an M114 155 mm howitzer gun line.

He later entered the Korean Military Academy (KMA), completing his studies as part of the first class of the four-year program. He graduated in February 1954 with a Bachelor of Science degree and a commission as an Army 2nd lieutenant in the 11th class of the KMA.

A commissioned officer in the infantry from 1954, Roh rose steadily through the ranks and fought first in the Vietnam War in 1968, as a lieutenant colonel and battalion commander, later as a major general and the commander of White Horse Division in 1979. A member of the Hanahoe, a secret military group, he gave critical support to the 1979 coup d'état of December Twelfth, in which Chun became the de facto ruler of South Korea. Roh helped Chun suppress the Gwangju Uprising in May 1980.

Roh held several key army posts, such as commander of the Capital Security Command in 1979 and commander of the Defense Security Command in 1980.

When Roh first joined the military, his surname was transcribed in English as "No." He later changed it to "Roh," which was based on the pronunciation without the application of the initial sound rule, to avoid the negative connotations of "No" in English.

== Political career ==
=== Cabinet minister ===
Following his retirement from the Army in July 1981, Roh accepted Chun's offer of the post of Minister of State for National Security and Foreign Affairs. Later, he served as Sports Minister, Home Affairs Minister, President of the Seoul Olympics Organizing Committee, and in 1985, chairman of the ruling Democratic Justice Party. Most notably, he oversaw preparations for the 1988 Summer Olympics in Seoul, which he officially declared open.

=== June 29 Declaration and run for presidency ===
Despite his involvement in the coup d'état of December 12 and the bloody military crackdown on dissidents in the Gwangju Uprising, and with an eye towards the Blue House in the upcoming 1987 presidential elections, Roh began working to distance himself from the unpopular Chun government. Roh worked to carry out his own agenda for democratic reform. By agreeing to meet the demands of the political opposition in terms of political reforms with his eight-point proposal, which included direct election of the President, Roh successfully upstaged Chun and boosted his own image as a reformer.

In June 1987, Chun named Roh as the presidential candidate of the ruling Democratic Justice Party. This was widely perceived as handing Roh the presidency on a silver platter, and triggered large pro-democracy rallies in Seoul and other cities in the 1987 June Democracy Movement.

In response, Roh made a speech on 29 June promising a wide program of reforms. Chief among them were a new, more democratic constitution and popular election of the president. On 1 July, Chun gave in and agreed to democratic elections.

In the election in December 1987, the two leading opposition figures, Kim Young-sam and Kim Dae-jung (both of whom later became presidents), were unable to overcome their political differences to form a unified ticket, resulting in separate campaigns that split the vote. This enabled Roh to win by a narrow margin with 36.6% of the vote, becoming the country's first democratically elected president on 16 December 1987.

== Presidency (1988–1993) ==
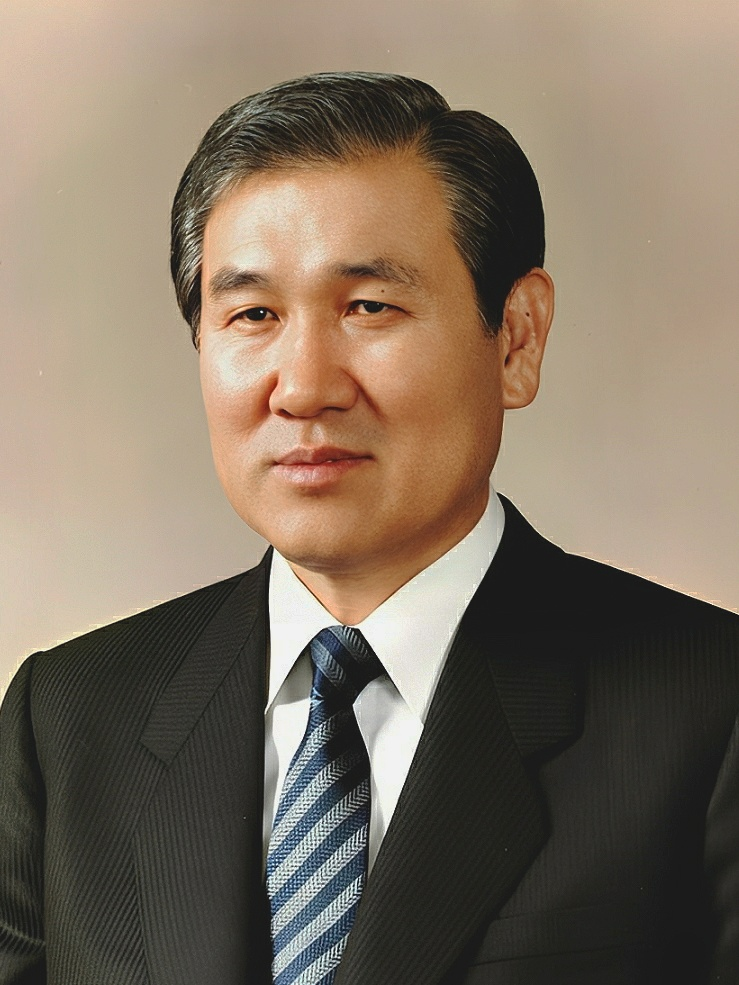
- Official portrait, c. 1988
- Presidency of Roh Tae-woo; 25 February 1988 – 25 February 1993
- Prime Minister: Lee Hyun-jae; Kang Young-hoon; Ro Jai-bong; Chung Won-shik; Hyun Soong-jong
- Cabinet: Full list
- Party: Democratic Justice (1988–1990); Democratic Liberal (1990–1992); Independent (1992–1993)
- Election: 1987
- Seat: Seoul

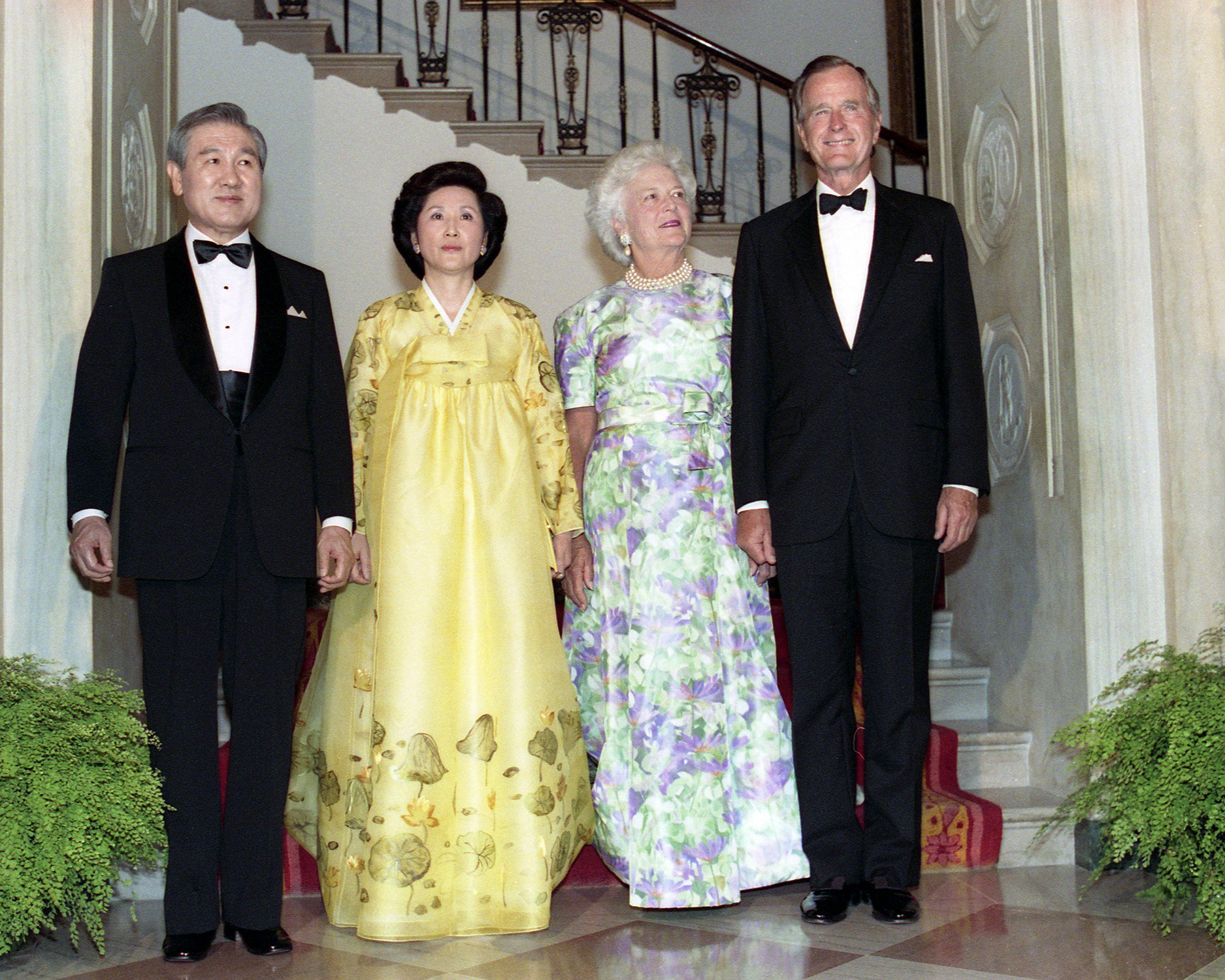
Roh Tae-woo and President of United States George H. W. Bush in 1991

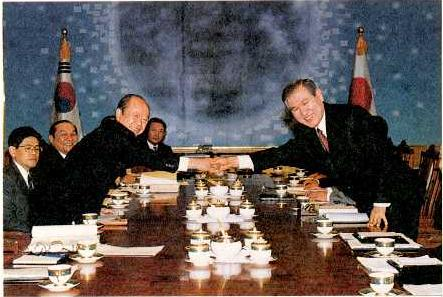
Roh and Prime minister of Japan Kiichi Miyazawa in 1992

Roh was inaugurated as president on 25 February 1988. For the first time, the ceremony was held outside the National Assembly Building. Subsequent presidents have been inaugurated at the same location. In his inauguration speech, Roh pledged to open an era of democracy, bringing into full play the people's potential.

Roh's rule was notable for hosting the Seoul Olympics in 1988 and for his foreign policy of Nordpolitik, which represented a major break from previous administrations. True to his word, he remained committed to democratic reforms and was steadfast in the push toward political and socio-economic reforms at home. Democratization of politics, economic "growth with equity," and national reunification were the three policy goals publicly stated by the Roh administration.

However, in 1992, Roh's government sealed up a cave on Mount Halla where the remains of the Jeju uprising massacre victims had been discovered, continuing a series of coverups by successive administrations on the truth of the uprising.

=== Merging of political parties in 1990 ===
In order to overcome the paralysis of governing due to lack of majority support in the National Assembly, the Roh government sought to attain "a grand compromise" in partisan politics. A party merger was announced on 22 January 1990 in an attempt to accomplish this political objective. The ruling Democratic Justice Party merged with two opposition parties, Kim Young-sam's Reunification and Democracy Party and Kim Jong-pil's New Democratic Republican Party. The new established Democratic Liberal Party, which commanded a more than two-thirds majority in the legislature, sought to establish political stability so as to enable socio-economic progress. However, the merger was fraught with factional infighting, undermining his administration's handling of national affairs.

=== Foreign policy ===
He met with President Corazon Aquino for a series of talks between the Philippines and South Korea for economic, social, and cultural ties, supporting the Filipino boxer Leopoldo Serantes in the Olympics, and to discuss unification talks to end North Korea's hostility after the Korean War.

During his administration, Roh's stance as President was very active in diplomacy. Successfully hosting the 24th Summer Olympics in Seoul in his first year in office was a major accomplishment, followed by his active diplomacy, including his address before the United Nations General Assembly in October 1988, his meeting with U.S. President George H. W. Bush, and delivering a speech before a joint session of the U.S. Congress. He also conducted a five-nation European visit in December 1989.

On 7 July 1988, he launched an aggressive foreign policy initiative called the Northern Diplomacy, or Nordpolitik, which brought about benefits and rewards to his government. In 1989, Seoul established diplomatic relations with Hungary and Poland, followed by diplomatic ties with Yugoslavia, Romania, Czechoslovakia, Bulgaria, and Mongolia in 1990. South Korea's trade with the People's Republic of China steadily increased, reaching the $3.1 billion mark at the same time South Korea's trade with the Eastern Bloc nations and the Soviet Union increased to $800 million. Seoul and Moscow exchanged full consular general's offices in 1990. Roh's moves left North Korea more isolated and was a dramatic and historic turning point of South Korea's diplomatic goals.

On 4 June 1990, Roh met with Mikhail Gorbachev, President of the Soviet Union, during a visit to the United States. The meeting ended 42 years of official silence between the two countries and paved the way for improved diplomatic relations. Roh later visited the Soviet Union in 1991. In 1992, South Korea established diplomatic relations with the PRC.

=== North Korean relations ===
The Nordpolitik policy also proposed the interim development of a "Korean Community", which was similar to a North Korean proposal for a confederation.

From 4 to 7 September 1990, high-level talks were held in Seoul, at the same time that the North was protesting about the Soviet Union normalizing relations with the South. In December 1991 both states made an accord, the Agreement on Reconciliation, Non-Aggression, Exchange and Cooperation, pledging non-aggression and cultural and economic exchanges. They also agreed on prior notification of major military movements and established a military hotline, and working on replacing the Korean Armistice Agreement with a "peace regime". The agreement was praised for forming a foundation for cross-border exchanges and cooperation.

In January 1992, North and South Korea also signed the Joint Declaration of the Denuclearization of the Korean Peninsula, although the North subsequently reneged and pursued its own nuclear weapons program. This coincided with the admission of both North and South Korea into the United Nations. Meanwhile, on 25 March 1991, a unified Korean team, for the first time, used the Korean Unification Flag at the World Table Tennis Competition in Japan, and on 6 May 1991, a unified team competed at the World Youth Football Competition in Portugal.

=== Economy and infrastructure ===
Roh's emphasis on "economic growth with equity," although well received by the public, led to the dwindling in the annual economic growth rate from the high of 12.3 percent in 1988 to 6.7 percent in 1989. As labor strikes and demands for higher wages intensified, the Roh government imposed an austerity plan to keep South Korea's export-oriented economy more competitive internationally. However, pursuit of higher wages in the wake of the strikes and the appreciation of the South Korean won in value against the U.S. dollar made South Korean products less competitive internationally.

His policies cancelled debt in rural areas, constructed two million new houses, and established public land ownership for the public interest. In addition, under his administration, large-scale national projects such as Incheon International Airport opened in 2001 and the Korea Train Express (KTX) high speed rail system opened in 2004. Both of these began construction under his administration in 1992.

== Post-presidency (1993–2021) ==
Barred from running for a second term in 1992 (the 1987 constitution retained the previous ban on reelection), Roh left office on 24 February 1993.

=== Trial, jail sentence and pardon ===
In 1993, Roh's successor Kim Young-sam led an anti-corruption campaign that investigated Roh and Chun. Kim had previously merged his party with Roh's in a deal that enabled him to win the election. Kim's administration also officially recognised the 12 December incident as a coup.

In October 1995, Roh, in a tearful televised speech, publicly apologized for having illegally amassed hundreds of millions of dollars in secret political donations during his term as president. Roh was arrested in November 1995 on charges of bribery. The two former presidents were also later separately charged with mutiny and treason for their roles in the 1979 coup and the 1980 Gwangju massacre.

The "trial of the century", as described by the media, saw both convicted in August 1996 for treason, mutiny, and corruption; Chun was sentenced to death, later commuted to life imprisonment, while Roh's 22½-year jail sentence was reduced to 17 years on appeal. Both were released from prison in December 1997 and pardoned by Kim Young-sam on advice of president-elect Kim Dae-jung. Both Roh and Chun attended Kim Dae-jung's inauguration on 25 February 1998.

In March 2006, Roh was also stripped of 11 national honours which he previously received.

Roh finished repaying fines from his illegally gained wealth in 2013. In 2013, the remaining W24 billion (USD22 million) of a W262.9 billion fine for corruption in office was paid. He mostly stayed out of politics and maintained a low profile in retirement, and he continued to express remorse over his crimes until his death in 2021. In 2019, two years before Roh's death, his son went to Gwangju and visited the May 18th National Cemetery on behalf of his father. Roh's son visited the cemetery a second time in 2020, and he offered a flower wreath under his father's name. In contrast, his friend and predecessor, Chun Doo-hwan stopped repaying his remaining fines and did not show regret or remorse for his past actions.

=== Health (2002–2021) ===
Roh suffered from prostate cancer and received surgery in 2002. He also suffered from cerebellar atrophy and asthma. His son, Roh Jae-heon who is a lawyer based in the United States, said that Roh spent most of his final 10 years of his life in the hospital, while his daughter Roh Soh-yeong, an art museum director, said he was bedridden for the past 10 years and unable to speak or move his body. On 12 August 2014, while in confinement at the Seoul National University Hospital, Roh was visited by his predecessor and friend Chun Doo-hwan.

== Death and state funeral ==
Roh died in intensive care at the Seoul National University Hospital at 1:45pm KST on 26 October 2021, at the age of 88. His family released his last will and message: (Note: "나름대로 최선의 노력을 다했지만 그럼에도 부족한 점 및 저의 과오들에 대해 깊은 용서를 바란다. 주어진 운명을 겸허하게 그대로 받아들여, 위대한 대한민국과 국민을 위해 봉사할 수 있어서 참으로 감사하고 영광스러웠다. 생애에 이루지 못한 남북한 평화통일이 다음 세대들에 의해 꼭 이루어지기를 바란다")

While I tried my best in my own way, I deeply ask for forgiveness for my shortcomings and mistakes. I was truly grateful and honored to humbly accept the fate of serving the great Republic of Korea and its people. I hope that the peaceful reunification of North and South Korea that was not achieved in my lifetime will be achieved by the next generation.

In view of Roh's mixed and disputed legacy, the government decided to hold a state funeral for Roh following a debate within the national cabinet, in recognition of his "significant contributions to the nation's development". The decision was criticized by some, including survivors and victims' families of the Gwangju massacre and members of the ruling liberal Democratic Party. The city of Gwangju and several other cities and provincial governments refused to raise flags half-mast or set up memorial altars for Roh in accordance with state funeral procedures. In Seoul, memorial altars saw a low turnout of mourners coming to pay their respects.

The scaled-down state funeral service, held in the middle of the COVID-19 pandemic, took place at Olympic Park, Seoul on 30 October, in recognition of the 1988 Summer Olympics which was successfully held there under his presidency. Prime Minister Kim Boo-kyum gave a eulogy. By law, Roh was not eligible for burial at a national cemetery because of his past criminal record and conviction. On 9 December 2021, two months after his death, Roh's ashes were interred at Paju, a border town to North Korea, on Unification Hill.

He died about one month before Chun died on 23 November 2021 from complications of blood cancer.

== Electoral record ==
Year	Elections	Constituency	Political party	No. of votes	%	Results
1985	12th National Assembly General Election	National (3rd)	Democratic Justice Party	7,040,477	35.25%	Elected
1987	1987 Presidential Election	South Korea	Democratic Justice Party	8,282,738	36.64%	Won

== Honours ==
- South Korea:
  - Recipient of the Grand Order of Mugunghwa

=== Foreign honours ===
- Belgium:
  - Grand Cordon of the Order of Leopold
- Malaysia:
  - Honorary Recipient of the Order of the Crown of the Realm (1988)
- United Kingdom:
  - Honorary Knight Grand Cross of the Order of St Michael and St George
- Yugoslavia:
  - Order of the Yugoslav Great Star (1990)
- International Olympic Committee:
  - Olympic Order

== In popular culture ==
- Roh is portrayed by Seo In-seok in the 2005 MBC TV series 5th Republic.
- Park Moo-yeol, a fictional character modelled after Roh Tae-woo, is portrayed in a cameo by Kang Moon-kyung in 2021 JTBC drama series Snowdrop
- Noh Tae-geon, a fictional character modelled after Roh, is also portrayed in the 2023 South Korean film 12.12: The Day.

== See also ==
- History of South Korea

== Notes ==
Political offices
Preceded by Chun Doo-hwan	President of South Korea; 25 February 1988–24 February 1993	Succeeded by Kim Young-sam
Preceded by New Office	Minister of Home Affairs; 16 July 1981–20 March 1982	Succeeded by Office abolished
Preceded by New Office	Minister of Sports; 20 March 1982–28 April 1982	Succeeded by Lee Won-kyeong
Preceded by Suh Chung-hwa	Minister of State for National Security and Foreign Affairs; 28 April 1982–6 July 1983	Succeeded by Choo Young-bock
National Assembly of the Republic of Korea
Preceded by	Member of the National Assembly from National (3rd, Democratic Justice Party); 11 April 1985–20 December 1987	Succeeded by
Diplomatic posts
Preceded by Wee Kim Wee	Chairperson of APEC; 1991	Succeeded by Anand Panyarachun
Party political offices
Preceded by Kwon Ik-hyun	Chairman of Democratic Justice Party; 23 February 1985–1 August 1987	Succeeded by Chae Mun-shik
Preceded by Chun Doo-hwan	President of Democratic Justice Party, Democratic Liberal Party; 10 July 1987–2 February 1990; 9 May 1990–28 August 1992	Succeeded by Kim Young-sam
Preceded by Chun Doo-hwan (Honor President of Democratic Justice Party)	Honor President of Democratic Liberal Party; 28 August 1992–18 September 1992	Succeeded by Kim Young-sam (Honor President of New Korea Party)
Preceded by Chun Doo-hwan	Democratic Justice Party nominee for President of South Korea; 1987	Succeeded by Kim Young-sam
Sporting positions
Preceded by (South Korea) Kim Yong-shik	President of Organizing Committee for Summer Olympic Games; 1983–1986	Succeeded by (South Korea) Park Seh-jik
