= Nordpolitik =

1980's - 1990's South Korean international relations movement

- Hangul: 북방 정책
- Hanja: 北方政策
- RR: Bukbang jeongchaek
- MR: Pukpang chŏngch'aek

South Korea opening diplomatic relations with socialist countries.

Nordpolitik (German for 'Northern Policy') was the signature foreign policy of South Korean president Roh Tae-woo. The policy guided South Korean efforts to reach out to the traditional allies of North Korea, with the goal of normalized relations with the closest allies to North Korea, China, and the Soviet Union. By adopting Nordpolitik, South Korea abolished the doctrine of the enemy of my enemy is my friend and understood that the indirect approach was a more plausible way to engage with North Korea. The policy improved the South's economy while leaving the North more isolated and was a dramatic and historic turning point of South Korea's diplomatic goals.

The policy was named after the West German policy of Ostpolitik ('Eastern Policy') towards the then communist East Germany, although the Ostpolitik was aimed directly at a normalization of the relationship between two German states. The successor of the Nordpolitik was the Sunshine Policy, which bore more tangible similarities with the German Ostpolitik.

== Overview ==
President Roh Tae-woo recruited Kim Chong-whi as his special assistant on foreign affairs for the implementation of the Nordpolitik policies. On July 7, 1988, Roh gave the first high-profile public address on Nordpolitik, revealing a six-point program. Its goal was not only for a greater diversification of South Korea's trading partners but also for ensuring peace and security on the Korean Peninsula. This included promotion of trade, exchanges of visits at all levels, humanitarian contacts between the two Koreas and Seoul's discontinuation of opposing nonmilitary trade between North Korea and its allies. The 1988 Summer Olympics planned for September of that year was not mentioned at this speech, but it was later revealed that Nordpolitik was designed to smooth the way for the participation of Soviet Bloc countries at the 1988 Summer Olympics in Seoul. While preparing for the Olympics, it was difficult for South Korea to deal with North Korea's appeal for co-sponsorship at the games, and for South Korea later to dissolve the possible boycott from the socialist bloc as proposed by Pyongyang. However, by adopting Nordpolitik policy, Chinese and Soviet teams participated and Seoul successfully hosted the 1988 Olympics.

In 1990, Roh made a press conference immediately after the fall of the Berlin Wall, addressing that the Cold War ice had begun to crack. Roh also repeated saying that the ultimate objective of the Nordpolitik policies was not to isolate North Korea but to induce the North to open up and to reduce military tensions.

== See also ==
- Korean reunification
- Sunshine Policy
