= Lew Byong-hion =

South Korean general and diplomat (1924–2020)

- Born: 18 October 1924; Cheongwon County, Chūseihoku-dō, Korea, Empire of Japan
- Died: 21 May 2020 (aged 95)

Korean name
- Hangul: 류병현; 유병현
- Hanja: 柳炳賢
- RR: Ryu Byeonghyeon; Yu Byeonghyeon
- MR: Ryu Pyŏnghyŏn; Yu Pyŏnghyŏn
- IPA: [ɾju.bjʌŋçʌn]

Lew Byong-hion (Korean: 류병현; 18 October 1924 – 21 May 2020) was a South Korean general and diplomat. He served in the Republic of Korea Army from 1948 to 1981, after which he served in the Ministry of Foreign Affairs until 1986. Some sources also give his name as Lew Byong-hyon, Lew Byong-hyun, Lew Byung-hyun, or Yu Byung-hyun.

== Biography ==
Lew was born on 18 October 1924 in Cheongwon County, Chūseihoku-dō, Korea, Empire of Japan (now in South Korea).

=== Military career ===
Lew graduated from the 7th class of the Korea Military Academy in 1948. He was promoted to brigadier-general in 1961. He was a supporter of Park Chung Hee's coup in May that year, and was rewarded for his loyalty with a post in Park's junta as Minister of Agriculture after the resignation of Major General Chang Kyu-soon in June 1963.

Lew continued in his military posts as well; from September 1966 to September 1967, he was Commander of the "Tiger" Division in Vietnam. Among other operations, he was responsible for the controversial evacuation of civilians from the mountains of Phu Cat District in 1966. After his return from Vietnam, Lew became the Director of Planning and Operations (작전기획부장) under the Joint Chiefs of Staff. He was widely noted for his 1968 prediction that North Korea would launch an all-out attack on South Korea, "whether it be today or in years to come", though Charles H. Bonesteel III disagreed with his assessment.

Lew continued his rise through the ranks, finally being promoted to daejang in 1977. In that capacity, he inaugurated the ROK-US Combined Forces Command in 1978 and served as its first deputy commander. In December 1979, Lew additionally became Chairman of the Joint Chiefs of Staff. As Chairman, Lew visited the United States in November 1980 at the invitation of U.S. Joint Chiefs of Staff Chairman David C. Jones. While there, he met with then-President-elect Ronald Reagan's national security advisor Richard V. Allen regarding Kim Dae-jung, who was facing capital punishment on charges of sedition for his role in the Gwangju Uprising; this was the first step in a diplomatic push by Reagan that would ultimately see Kim's death sentence commuted. He held the position of Chairman until his retirement from the military in 1981.

=== Civilian career ===
After his retirement, Lew continued working for the South Korean government in civilian positions. He was named South Korea's eleventh ambassador to the United States in May 1981, succeeding Kim Yong-shik. Among other duties there, he continued to keep a close eye on Kim Dae-jung, who had gone into exile in the United States in 1982 after his prison sentence was suspended. He remained in Washington D.C. until 1985, thereafter becoming the Ministry of Foreign Affairs' ambassador-at-large until 1986.

== Personal life ==
He was married to Yang Jeong-hui (양정희), with whom he had four sons.

Military offices
| Preceded by Kim Jong-Hwan | Chairman of the Joint Chiefs of Staff; 1979–1981 | Succeeded by Yoon Seung-Min |
Diplomatic posts
| Preceded by Kim Yong-shik | Ambassador of South Korea to the United States; 1981–1985 | Succeeded by Kim Kyung-won |
