= Kim Boo-kyum =

Prime Minister of South Korea from 2021 to 2022

- 김부겸
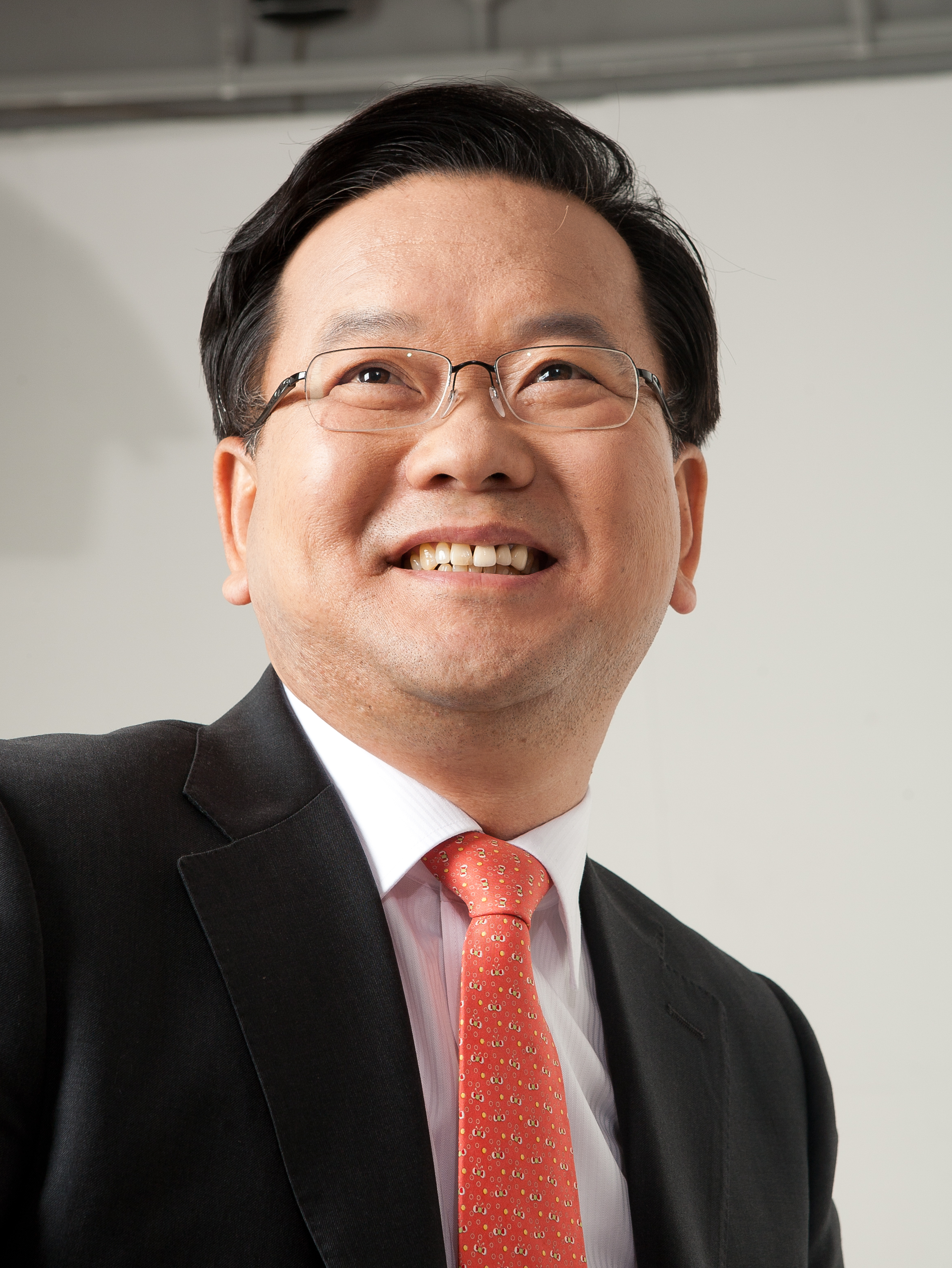
- Kim in 2017

47th Prime Minister of South Korea
- In office 15 May 2021 – 11 May 2022
- President: Moon Jae-in; Yoon Suk Yeol
- Deputy: Yoo Eun-hae; Hong Nam-ki
- Preceded by: Chung Sye-kyun; Hong Nam-ki (acting)
- Succeeded by: Choo Kyung-ho (acting); Han Duck-soo

Minister of the Interior and Safety
- In office 16 June 2017 – 6 April 2019
- President: Moon Jae-in
- Prime Minister: Lee Nak-yon
- Preceded by: Hong Yoon-shik
- Succeeded by: Chin Young

Member of the National Assembly
- In office 30 May 2000 – 29 May 2012
- Preceded by: Lew Seon-ho
- Succeeded by: Lee Hack-young
- Constituency: Gunpo (Gyeonggi)
- In office 30 May 2016 – 29 May 2020
- Preceded by: Lee Hahn-koo
- Succeeded by: Joo Ho-young
- Constituency: Suseong A (Daegu)

Personal details
- Born: 21 January 1958 (age 68) Sangju North Gyeongsang, South Korea
- Party: Democratic (since 2015)
- Other political affiliations: See list: HDP (1988–1991); Democratic (1991–1995); UDP (1995–1997); GNP (1997–2003); Independent (2003; 2007); Uri (2003–2007); GUDNP (2007–2008); UDP (2008); Democratic (2008–2011); DUP (2011–2013) Democratic (2013–2014); NPAD (2014–2015)
- Education: Seoul National University (BA); Yonsei University (MPA)
- Occupation: Activist, politician

Korean name
- Hangul: 김부겸
- Hanja: 金富謙
- RR: Gim Bugyeom
- MR: Kim Pugyŏm

Kim Boo-kyum (Korean: 김부겸; born 21 January 1958) is a South Korean activist and politician who served as the 47th prime minister of South Korea from 2021 to 2022 under President Moon Jae-in. A member of the Democratic Party of Korea (DPK), he was the minister of the interior and safety from 2017 to 2019.

== Early life and education ==
Kim Boo-kyum was born on 21 January 1958 in Sangju, North Gyeongsang. He is the eldest of the one son and three daughters of Kim Young-ryong and Cha Sook-hui. His father, Kim Young-ryong, was just 19 years old when Kim Boo-kyum was born.

Kim was admitted to study political science at Seoul National University in 1976, but was expelled for taking part in protests against the Yushin Constitution in 1977, before being readmitted and expelled again for violating martial law in 1980. He was later reinstated a second time, and received his degree in 1987.

== Political career ==
=== Early political career ===
Kim joined politics as one of the founders of the centre-left Hankyoreh Democratic Party (HDP) in 1988. He ran as the HDP candidate for Dongjak 1st constituency in the 1988 election but lost. No candidates were elected, except Park Hyung-oh that contested for Shinan, who immediately joined the Peace Democratic Party (PDP) due to the pre-agreement. The HDP was later de-registered.

Following the de-registration of the HDP, Kim joined the Democratic Party that was established by Kim Dae-jung in 1991. He had an intention to run in the 1992 election, but could not become a candidate. He served as the Deputy Spokesperson of the party, however, was arrested on 18 November after it was revealed that Kim received 5,000,000 won (£3,240) from a North Korean spy named Lee Seon-shil during the 1988 election. According to Park Jie-won, the then Senior Deputy Spokesperson, Kim borrowed the money from Lee through his mother-in-law, but paid it back after the election. He also indicated that Kim was not related to his party in 1988; he was also told that Kim did not even know that Lee was a spy.

=== National Assembly (2000–2012, 2016–2020) ===
Kim was the member of the National Assembly for Gunpo from 2000 to 2012, first for the Grand National Party (GNP) and then, from 2003, the liberal Uri Party and its successors.

In the 2016 parliamentary election in Suseong 1st constituency, Kim defeated his Saenuri opponent Kim Moon-soo in a 62.5 percent landslide, marking the first time a member of a liberal party had been elected in that city since 1985.

=== Prime Minister (2021–2022) ===
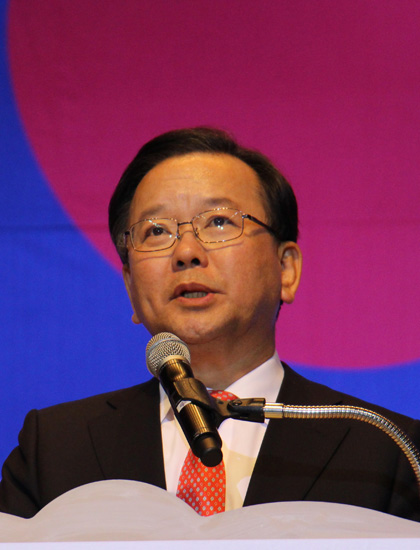
- Premiership of Kim Boo-kyum; May 14, 2021 – May 11, 2022
- President: Moon Jae-in
- Cabinet: Full list
- Party: Democratic
- Seat: Sejong City

==== Nomination ====
Since prime minister Chung Sye-kyun had the intention to run for the 2022 presidential election, he planned to resign at an unknown date. Several newspapers reported that he would step down after the by-elections on 7 April 2021. Despite the knowledge that President Moon Jae-in was reported to prefer a female prime minister, Kim was considered one of the potential candidates for the position.

On 15 April, Chung officially submitted his resignation to Moon Jae-in, and it was accepted the next day. The same day, Kim was nominated the new Prime Minister, succeeding Chung. As he was categorised as a "minority" of the Democratic Party, his nomination was regarded as a step to renovate the party that faced a serious defeat in the 2021 by-elections.

On 13 May, 168 out of 176 MPs voted in favour of the appointment of Kim as the Prime Minister. The next day, he was sworn in as Prime Minister at the Central Government Complex in Seoul.

In the 2016 parliamentary election in Suseong 1st constituency, Kim defeated his Saenuri opponent Kim Moon-soo in a 62.5 percent landslide, marking the first time a member of a liberal party had been elected in that city since 1985.

=== Daegu mayoral campaigns ===
Kim unsuccessfully ran for Mayor of Daegu in the 2014 local elections and received 40 percent of the vote, a number seen at the time as unusually large in the conservative stronghold. After his election loss, he hoped to "overcome the barrier of regionalism".

In the 2026 South Korean local elections, Kim ran for Mayor of Daegu again. He was endorsed by former mayor Hong Joon-pyo of the People Power Party. Though most pre-election polls had shown the race within a razor-thin margin, People Power Party nominee Choo Kyung-ho ultimately secured 53.92 percent of the vote against Kim's 45.05 percent.

== Political positions ==
Kim is considered a centrist. As a member of the Grand National Party he pressed for reform in the party, and when he defected from the party in 2003 he cited the need "to unify the nation ... and to root out regionalism". As a member of the Supreme Council of the Democratic United Party in 2012 he defended centrist members of the party from deselection. Commentators named Kim as a potential candidate in the 2017 presidential elections, although he ultimately did not run.

== Personal life ==
Kim's daughter, Yoon Se-in (born Kim Ji-su), is a television actress. Yoon campaigned for Kim in the 2012 parliamentary election and the 2014 mayoral race, but was unable to in 2016.

== Election results ==
=== General elections ===
Year	Elections	Constituency	Political party	Votes (%)	Remarks
1988	13th National Assembly General Election	Dongjak A (Seoul)	HDP	3,088 (3.25%)	Defeated (5th)
1996	15th National Assembly General Election	Gwacheon–Uiwang (Gyeonggi)	UDP	18,730 (18.02%)	Defeated (3rd)
2000	16th National Assembly General Election	Gunpo (Gyeonggi)	GNP	46,330 (45.54%)	Won
2004	17th National Assembly General Election	Gunpo (Gyeonggi)	Uri	61,419 (49.56%)	Won
2008	18th National Assembly General Election	Gunpo (Gyeonggi)	UDP	49,638 (50.82%)	Won
2012	19th National Assembly General Election	Suseong A (Daegu)	DUP	46,413 (40.42%)	Defeated (2nd)
2016	20th National Assembly General Election	Suseong A (Daegu)	Democratic	84,911 (62.30%)	Won
2020	21st National Assembly General Election	Suseong A (Daegu)	Democratic	60,462 (39.29%)	Defeated (2nd)

=== Local elections ===
==== Mayor of Daegu ====
Year	Elections	Constituency	Political party	Votes (%)	Remarks
2014	6th Iocal Election	Daegu (Mayoral Elections)	NPAD	418,891 (40.33%)	Defeated (2nd)
2026	9th Iocal Election	Daegu (Mayoral Elections)	Democratic	586,927 (45.05%)	Defeated (2nd)

National Assembly of the Republic of Korea
Preceded by Lew Seon-ho	Member of the National Assembly for Gunpo (Gyeonggi); 30 May 2000–29 May 2012	Succeeded by Lee Hack-young
Preceded by Lee Hahn-koo	Member of the National Assembly for Suseong A (Daegu); 30 May 2016–29 May 2020	Succeeded by Joo Ho-young
Political offices
Preceded by Hong Yoon-shik	Minister of the Interior and Safety; 16 June 2017–6 April 2019	Succeeded by Chin Young
Preceded by Chung Sye-kyun; Hong Nam-ki (Acting)	Prime Minister of South Korea; 14 May 2021–11 May 2022	Succeeded by Choo Kyung-ho (Acting); Han Duck-soo
