= List of ambassadors of South Korea =

List of ambassadors from South Korea, by country or body where representation took place in parentheses:

== Current ambassadors ==
Host country	Ambassador	Confirmed	Formation	List
Argentina	Lee Yongsoo	2023	1962	List
Armenia	Lee Sok-bae	2019	1992	
Australia	Kang Jeong-sik	2020	1962	
Austria	Shin Jae-hyun	2019	1963	
Azerbaijan	Lee Eun-yong	2022	1992	
Bahrain	Chung Hae-kwan	2020	1976	
Belgium	Yoon Soon-goo	2019	1961	
Brazil	Kim Chan-woo	2018	1962	
Cameroon	Kim Jong-han	2020	1961	
Canada	Jang Gyeong-ryong	2020	1963	
Chile	Jang Geun-ho	2020	1962	
China	Vacant		1992	
Croatia	Kim Dong-chan	2019	1992	
Czech Republic	Kim Tae-jin	2019	1990	
East Timor	Kim Jeong-ho	2020	2002	
Egypt	Hong Jin-wook	2020	1962	
Ethiopia	Kang Seok-hee	2020	1963	
France	Yoo Dae-jong	2020	1949	
Germany	Jo Hyun-ok	2020	1958	
Holy See	Choo Gyu-ho	2020	1966	
India	Chang Jae-bok	2018	1973	
Indonesia	Park Tae-seong	2020	1973	
Iran	Ryu Jeong-hyun	2018	1962	
Iraq	Jang Gyeong-wook	2018	1989	
Israel	Seo Dong-gu	2019	1993	
Italy	Kwon Hee-seog	2019	1956	
Ivory Coast	Lee Sang-yeol	2019	1961	
Japan	Lee Hyeok	Appointed	1966	
Kazakhstan	Koo Hong-seok	2020	1992	
Libya	Lee Sang-soo	2020	1980	
Madagascar	Sohn Yong-ho	2020	1962	
Malaysia	Lee Chi-beom	2019	1960	
Mexico	Seo Jeong-in	2020	1962	
Mongolia	Lee Yeo-hong	2019	1990	
Morocco	Chung kee-yong	2021	1952	
New Zealand	Lee Sang-jin	2020	1962	
Pakistan	Gwak Seong-gyu	2018	1983	
Peru	Cho Young-jun	2020	1963	
Philippines	Han Dong-man	2018	1949	List
Poland	Mira Sun	2019	1989	
Russia	Vacant		1990	
Saudi Arabia	Park Joon-yong	2018	1962	
Serbia	Choi Hyeong-chan	2018	1989	
Singapore	Ahn Young-jip	2018	1975	
Slovakia	Chung Byung-hwa	2019	1990	
South Africa	Yang Dong-han	2024	1992	
Spain	Jeon Hong-jo	2018	1950	
Sri Lanka	Jeong Woon-jin	2020	1977	
Sweden	Lee Jung-gyu	2018	1959	
Switzerland	Rho Tae-gang	2020	1963	
Thailand	Lee Wook-heon	2018	1958	
Trinidad	Oh Dongil	2021	1985	
Turkey	Lee Won-ik	2020	1957	
Turkmenistan	Shin Sung-chul	2021	1992	
United Arab Emirates	Kwon Yong-woo	2019	1980	
United Kingdom	Park Eunha	2018	1957	
United States	Kang Kyung-wha	Appointed	1949	List
Uruguay	Lee Eun-cheol	2020	1964	
Uzbekistan	Kang Jae-Kwon	2019	1992	
Vietnam	Park Nho-wan	2019	1992	

== Ambassadors to international organization ==
Host organization	Ambassador	Confirmed	Formation	List
ASEAN	Lim Seong-nam	2019	2012	
European Union	Yoon Soon-goo	2019	1963	
Geneva (United Nations and the other International Organizations in Geneva)	Paik Ji-ah	2018	1959	
International Civil Aviation Organization	Lee Yoon-je	2018	2001	
UNESCO	Kim Dong-gi	2019	1957	
United Nations	Vacant		1951	
Organisation for Economic Co-operation and Development	Go Hyeong-gwon	2019	1997	
