= Lists of ambassadors of South Korea =

Lists of ambassadors of South Korea may refer to:

- List of ambassadors of South Korea to Peru
- List of ambassadors of South Korea to the Philippines
- List of ambassadors of South Korea to Mongolia
- List of ambassadors of South Korea to the United States
