= Angela Jia Kim =

American classical pianist

Angela Jia Kim (born in East Lansing, Michigan) is an American classical pianist.

Kim grew up in Ames, Iowa. Her mother was her first piano teacher, but she later studied at the Eastman School of Music. She received intensive coaching from Sergei Babayan, and her other teachers include Marc Durand, Lee Kum-Sing, Barry Snyder, Chiu-Ling Lin, and her mother Hannah Kim. Her great uncle was Kim Yong-shik, the South Korean ambassador to the United States under the Carter and Reagan administrations. Her grandfather was Kim Yong-ik, the celebrated writer who moved to the United States in 1948.

Kim won her first performance prizes at age four and made her orchestral debut with the Des Moines Symphony at the age of 15. She has toured the United States and Europe as soloist and chamber musician. She has won the 1991 grand prize at the Mozart Festival Competition in Illinois, as well as the 1997 award for Best Interpretation of French Music by the French Piano Institute in Paris.

In 2001, Kim recorded Scriabin, Mozart, Schubert, and Ravel for her debut album, Dances and Fantasies. In 2005, she recorded her second album, From Vienna to Paris, which includes Ravel, Schubert, Haydn, and Schumann.

She currently resides in Manhattan, New York, with her husband, Mark and her daughter, Sienna.

== Discography ==
- Dances and Fantasies (2001)
- Vienna to Paris (2005)
