= Wonhoe-class offshore patrol vessel =

The Wonhae class are a series of six offshore patrol vessels being built for the Philippine Navy by Hyundai Heavy Industries (HHI) at its Ulsan shipyard in South Korea. The last will be completed in 2028.

NOTE: The name Wonhae 원해 is provisional, as it is a Korean language term with the meaning "deep waters".

== Design ==
The ships will be:

- 2,400 tonnes
- 94.4 metres long
- 14.3 meters wide
- maximum speed 22 knots (41 km/h)
- cruising speed of 15 knots (28 km/h)
- cruising range 5,500 nautical miles (10,200 km)

=== Armament and systems ===
The OPVs will have:

- a 76mm main gun
- two 30mm secondary guns
- a helideck capable of operating a helicopter and unmanned aerial vehicles.

== Contract signing ==
The contracts worth (KRW)744.9 billion Won (US$573.8 million) were signed at the Philippine Department of National Defense in Manila on 28 June 2022, in the presence of Philippine Defense Secretary Delfin N. Lorenzana, Chief of Staff of the Armed Forces of the Philippines General Andres Centino, Philippine Navy Vice Commander Caesar Bernard N. Valencia, Korea Shipbuilding and Offshore Engineering (KSOE) President Ka Sam-hyun, HHI Naval & Special Ship Business Unit Chief Operating Officer Nam Sang-hoon and Ambassador of the Republic of Korea to the Philippines Kim In-chul.
