= List of ambassadors of the Philippines to South Korea =

Ambassador of the Republic of the Philippines to the Republic of Korea
- Sugo ng Republika ng Pilipinas sa Republika ng Korea 주한 필리핀공화국 대사
- Seal of the Department of Foreign Affairs of the Philippines
- Incumbent; Bernadette Therese C. Fernandez since 15 September 2025
- Department of Foreign Affairs; Embassy of the Philippines, Seoul
- Style: His Excellency
- Reports to: Department of Foreign Affairs
- Seat: Seoul, South Korea
- Nominator: Secretary of Foreign Affairs
- Appointer: President of the Philippines; with the advice and consent of the Commission on Appointments
- Term length: No fixed term
- Inaugural holder: Tomas de Castro
- Formation: 11 May 1954
- Website: Philippine Embassy, Seoul

The ambassador of the Republic of the Philippines to the Republic of Korea (Filipino: Sugo ng Republika ng Pilipinas sa Republika ng Korea; Korean: 주한 필리핀공화국 대사) is an officer of the Philippine Department of Foreign Affairs and the head of the Embassy of the Philippines to the Republic of Korea. The position has the rank and status of an ambassador extraordinary and plenipotentiary.

== List of representatives ==
=== Ministers ===
Head of mission	Tenure	Remark(s)
Tomas de Castro	11 May 1954 – 1956	
Cosme P. Garcia	1956 – 1957	
Source: Embassy of the Republic of the Philippines, Seoul

=== Ambassadors ===
Head of mission	Tenure	Remark(s)
Eduardo T. Quintero	25 July 1958 - 1960	
Juan M. Arreglado	1960−1963	
Pedro L. Ramirez	July 1964 − 12 April 1968	
Benjamin T. Tirona	10 May 1968 − 1 April 1979	
Nicanor T. Jimenez	18 January 1980 − 15 April 1985	
Tomas R. Padilla	19 January 1986 − 31 December 1990	
Raul Ch. Rabe	23 April 1992 − 7 April 1993	
Francisco L. Benedicto	14 June 1993 − 16 May 1995	
Ernesto S. Gidaya	8 January 1996 − 31 August 1998	
Juanito P. Jarasa	21 May 1999 − 12 June 2003	
Aladin G. Villacorte	30 September 2003 − 31 June 2005	
Susan O. Castrence	27 January 2006 − 20 January 2008	
Luis T. Cruz	15 February 2008 − 7 February 2014	
Raul S. Hernandez	28 May 2014 − 30 April 2019	Conferred the Order of Diplomatic Service Merit (First Class) award during his tenure.
Noe Wong	2019−2020	Received sexual abuse controversy after leaving office.
Maria Theresa B. Dizon-De Vega	15 October 2021 − 30 July 2025	Credentials were presented on 15 October 2021.
Edwin Gil Q. Mendoza	1 August − 14 September 2025	Chargé d'Affaires
Bernadette Therese C. Fernandez	15 September 2025 − present	Credentials were presented on 11 December 2025.
Source: Embassy of the Republic of the Philippines, Seoul

== See also ==
- List of ambassadors of South Korea to the Philippines
- Foreign relations of the Philippines
- Foreign relations of South Korea
