= Yi Han-eung =

Korean civil servant and diplomat (1874–1905)

- 이한응
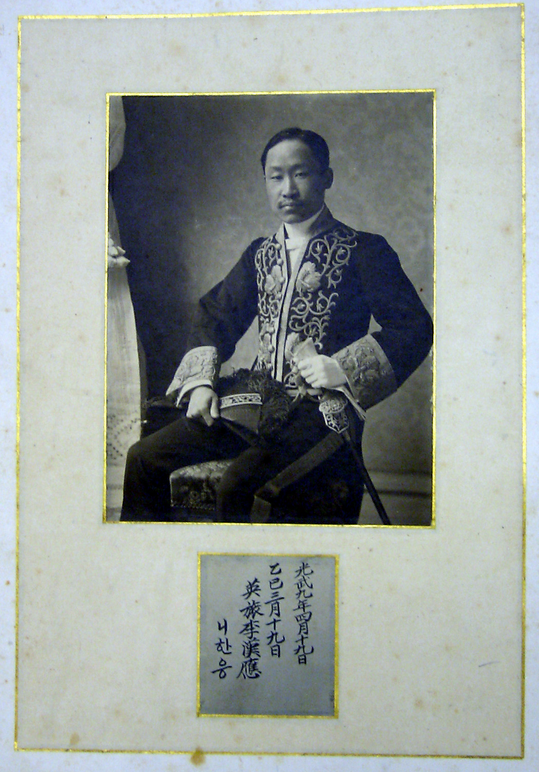

Chargé d'affaires to the UKGBI
- In office 1904 – 12 May 1905
- Monarch: Gojong of Korea

Personal details
- Born: 30 October 1874 Yongin, Joseon
- Died: 12 May 1905 (aged 30) 4 Trebovir Road, Earl's Court, London, UKGBI
- Cause of death: Suicide
- Spouse: Jin Yang-gang
- Children: 1
- Education: Sŏnggyun'gwan
- Occupation: Civil servant; diplomat
- Awards: Order of Merit for National Foundation, Independence Medal, 1962
- Writing career
- Pen name: Gyeongcheon (Korean: 경천; Hanja: 敬天)

Yi Han-eung (Korean: 이한응; Hanja: 李漢應; 30 October 1874 – 12 May 1905), also known as Lee Han-eung, was a Korean civil servant and diplomat who served as the Chargé d'affaires to the UKGBI from 1904 to 1905. Unable to secure British intervention to preserve the territorial integrity of the Korean Empire in the wake of the Russo-Japanese War, Yi died by suicide in May 1905. Yi was posthumously awarded the Order of Merit for National Foundation Independence Medal in 1962, and is considered a martyr of the Korean independence movement.

== Early life and education ==
Yi Han-eung was born on 30 October 1874 in Yongin, Joseon (present-day South Korea) to Lee Gyeong-ho, the Military Governor of Kunyang (present-day, Sacheon) and member of the Jeonui Lee clan (Korean: 전의 이씨; Hanja: 全義 李氏).

In 1889, Yi enrolled at Yukyeong Park (English: Royal English School), and graduated sometime between 1891 and 1892. Yi later attended Sŏnggyun'gwan and took the Gwageo national civil service examination and passed the saengjin-gwa (English: lower examination) Jinsa (English: literary licentiate) in 1894.

== Career ==
Following his father's death in 1894, Yi undertook 3 three years of mourning. In 1897, Yi began working as a Jusa (Note: A type of government official equivalent to a contemporary civil servant.) in Hanyangbu (present-day Seoul), and was appointed as an English instructor at Yukyeong Park in 1899.

=== London ===
On 14 March 1901, Yi was appointed a 3rd rank lower rank civil servant (Korean: 통훈대부; Hanja: 通訓大夫), at the consulate general for the UKGBI, and was stationed in London in August. Yi relocated to London alongside the Min Yong-ton, the Envoy and Plenipotentiary to the UKGBI and Kingdom of Italy, and lived temporary on Queen Victoria Street before moving to 4 Trebovir Road, Earl's Court.

In 1903, Yi was promoted to a 3rd rank civil servant (Korean: 통정대부; Hanja: 通政大夫). In November 1903, Min Yong-ton was dismissed and returned to Korea without appointing a successor. From early 1904, Yi Han-eung acted as the Charge d'affaires for the British consulate general.

=== Request for British intervention ===
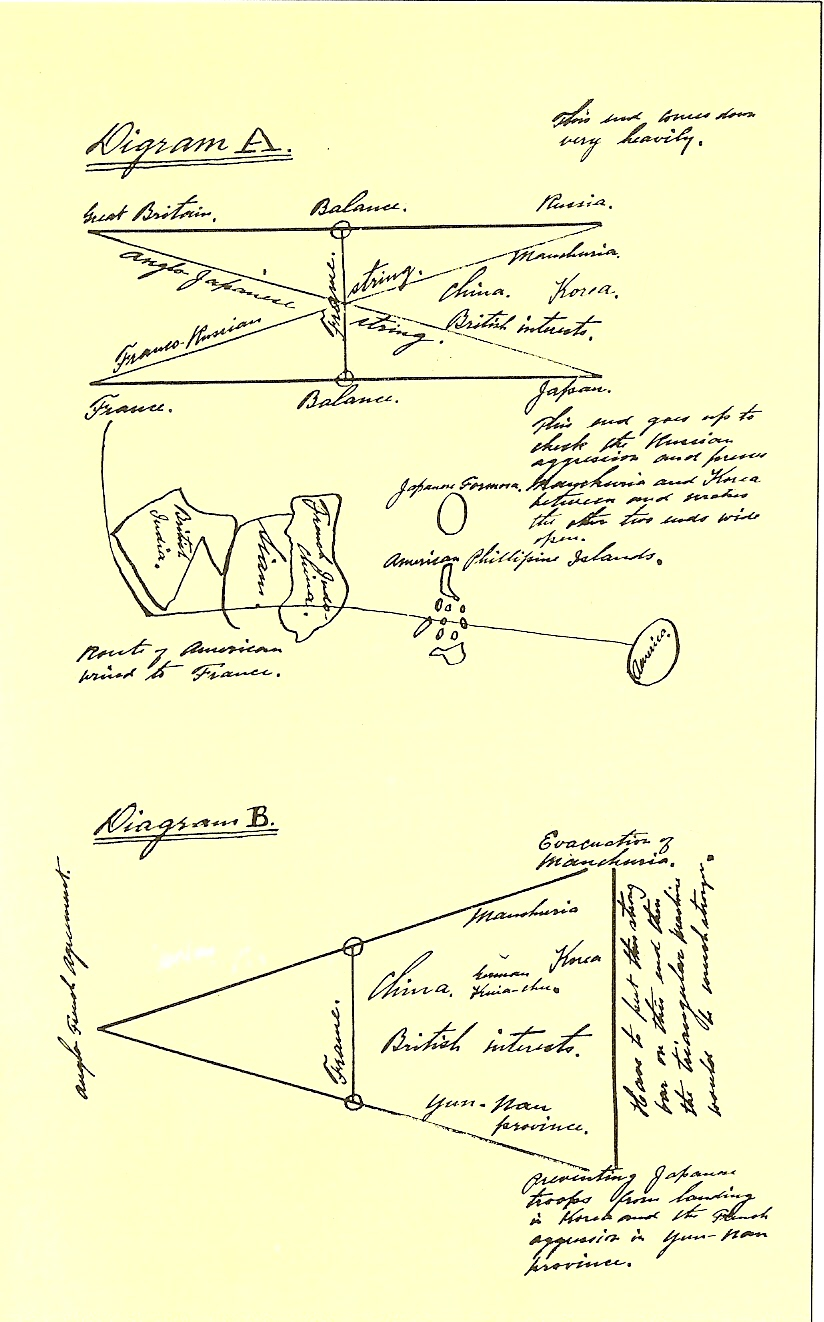
A diagram by Yi Han-eung that explains the dynamic relationship among powerful countries that surrounded the Korean peninsula

On 13 January 1904, 26 days before the break out of the Russo-Japanese War, Yi sent a memorandum to the Foreign Office requesting the British Government to preserve the territorial integrity of Korea. Yi's memorandum included a 5 point plan programme outlining how Britain could help secure similar guarantees on behalf of Korea from other powers, the need for international action to prevent "any aggressive Power from taking..... control of [the] Corean Government in any respect" and concluded that in the case of war between the Empire of Japan and the Russian Empire for Britain to ensure the preservation of "the independence, sovereignty, integrity and privileges of Corea as they are now by come [sic] to understanding with different powers, on whichever side the victory may be decided". The Foreign Minister Lord Lansdowne concluded that Yi's request was in essence a "request for a British guarantee of Korea against Japan as well as Russia" and that all the Powers were "in favour of the independence and integrity of Corea... [but] that it was out of the question that H.M.Govt. should give Corea a guarantee to that effect". Staff at the Far Eastern Department of the Foreign Office concluded that it would best to give Yi a verbal rather than written answer the next time he called at the Foreign office.

On the 19 January, a further illustrated memorandum was hand delivered to the Foreign Office by Yi. The second memorandum argued that " the Anglo-Japanese and Franco-Russian alliances are [not] the durable ones, and... it is high time for Great Britain and France to create a treaty of four powers for Far Eastern affairs as well as for the worlds", and if Britain and France continued to support opposite alliances both Korea and China would be unable to remain independent nations. Yi argued that Britain and France should enter into an entente, and that the current alliances could be converted to "a quadruple treaty with Japan and Russia in order [to] settle the present difficulty in a satisfactory manner, and that they have immense interests in the Far East to be safeguarded, and their treaty obligations that they [are] bound to share common interests and common danger." However, by the 21 January Korea had declared neutrality in the event of war, which Britain recognised. Lord Lansdowne's response on 28 January stated that "the policy of H.M.Gov't in respect of Corea may be gathered from the Anglo-Japanese agreement and [they] are not prepared to supplement that Agreement by a further agree such as the Corean Government apparently desire".

On 3 March 1905, Yi contacted the Foreign Office stating that the Russo-Japanese peace negotiations had made it evident that both Russia and Japan recognised Japan's claim over Korea, to which Yi argued that Japan should respect the territorial integrity of Korea in accordance with the 1902 Anglo-Japanese Alliance., Lord Lansdowne reply on 13 March concluding that “any discussion of the terms of peace as affecting Korea would not, in my opinion, be likely to have any useful results at the present moment.” Yi requested again for British intervention on 22 March, but only received a receipt on 1 April that his memorandum had been received. On 11 May 1905, Yi requested a meeting with the Foreign Minister but received no reply. Having been unable to secure British support, Yi died by suicide on 12 May 1905. Following Yi's death, the Consul General William Pritchard-Morgan temporarily took over Yi's roles. On the 22 December, Pritchard-Morgan handed over the embassy to diplomats from the Japanese Empire.

== Personal life and legacy ==
Yi was married to Jin Yang-gang, with whom he had one daughter. Yi is the grandfather of Lee Min-seop, a professor emeritus of architectural engineering at Dongguk University.

=== Legacy ===
- November 1905: Gojong expressed his condolences by writing, and bestowed Yi Han Eung a posthumous title of Naebuhyuppan.
- 1962: Yi was posthumously awarded the Order of Merit for National Foundation Independence Medal.
- 1964: A memorial monument was built in Jangchungdan park, Seoul.
- May 1995: Official ceremony held commemorating 90th year since Yi Han Eung's death
- May 2005: Official ceremony and research conference held commemorating 100th year since Yi Han Eung's death
- May 2015: "International Academic Conference Commemorating the 110th Anniversary of the Death of Martyr Lee Han-eung" was co-hosted by the Independence Hall of Korea and Embassy of South Korea.
- 2022: A bust of Yi Han-eung was installed at the Embassy of South Korea.
- October 2023, a commemorative plaque was installed at 4 Trebovir Road, the former site of the Korean Empire British Embassy.
- 12 May 2025: the "120th anniversary memorial event in honour of Yi" took place at the Korea National Diplomatic Academy (KNDA) Hall, Seoul.
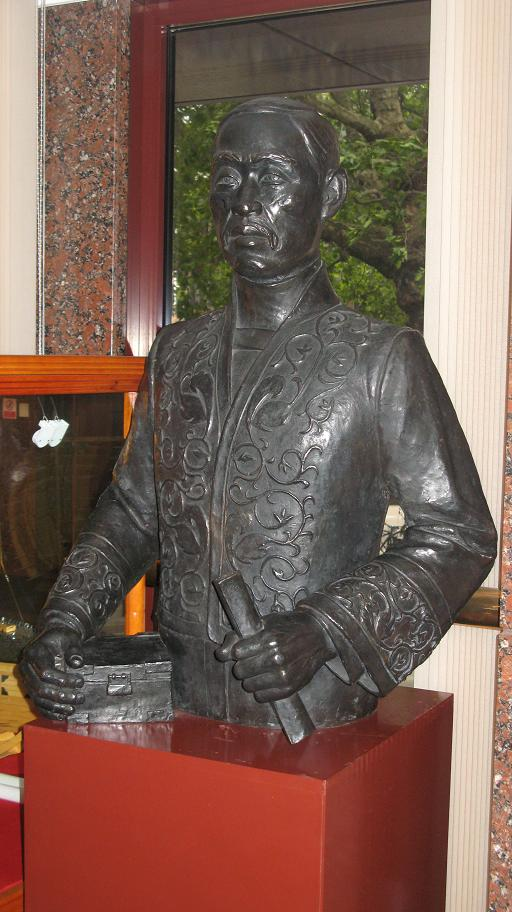
Bust of Yi Han-eung at the Embassy of South Korea, London

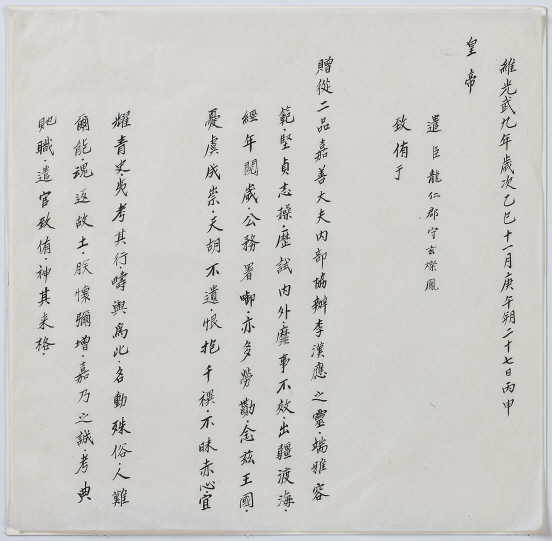
Emperor Gojong's memorial tablet to Yi Han-eung

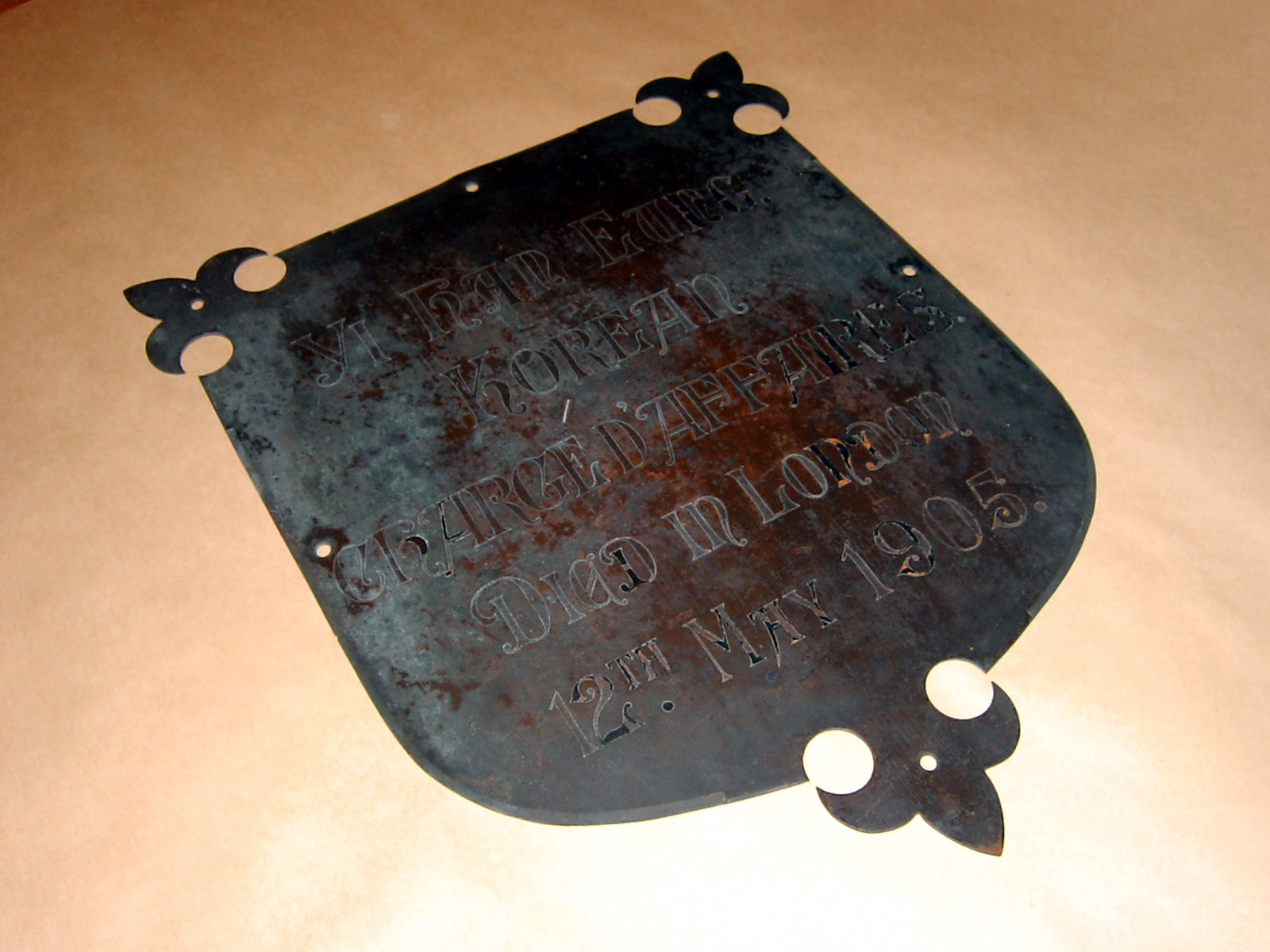
Plaque on Yi Han Eung's Coffin

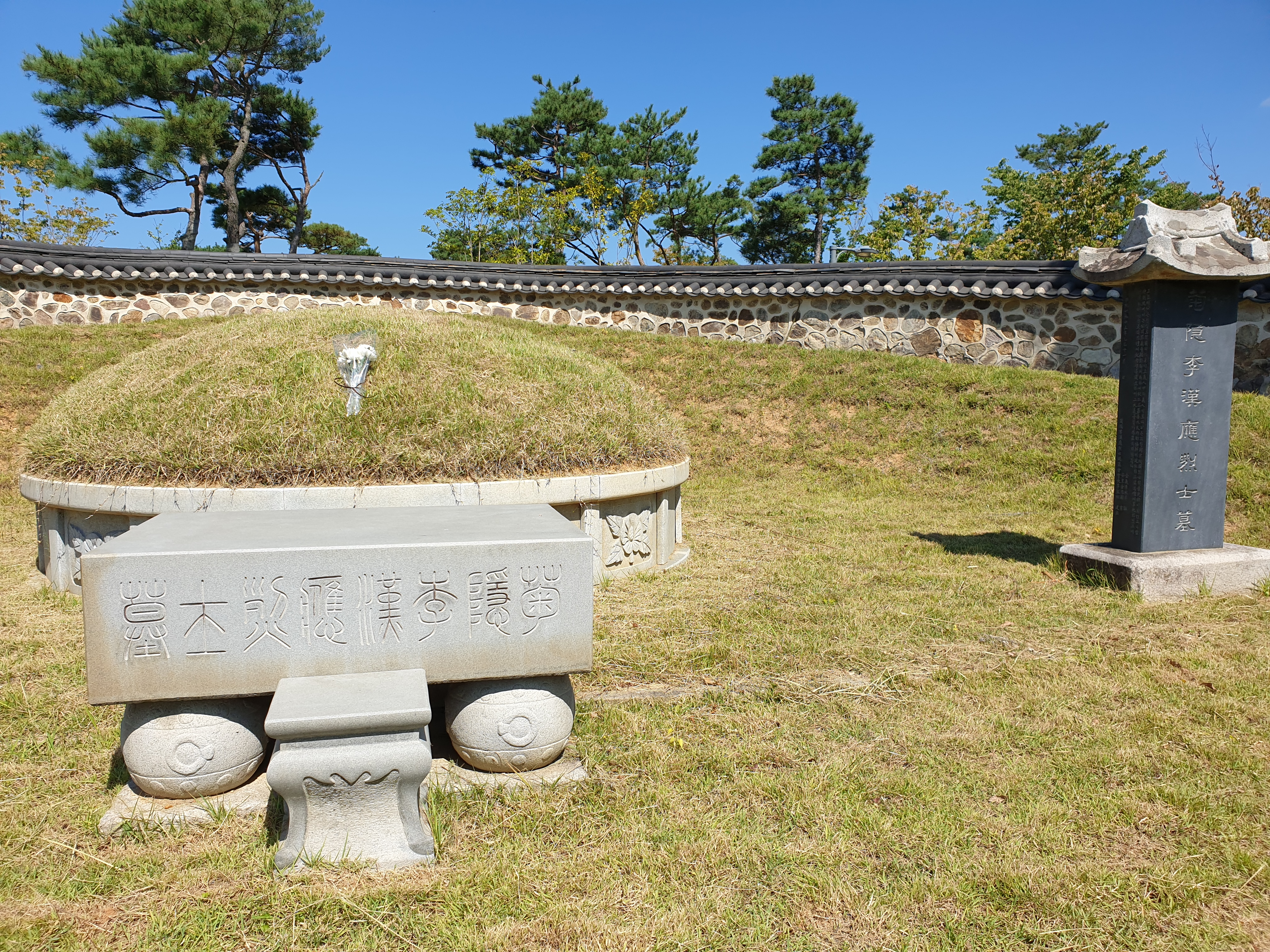
The Tomb of Martyr Yi Han-eung

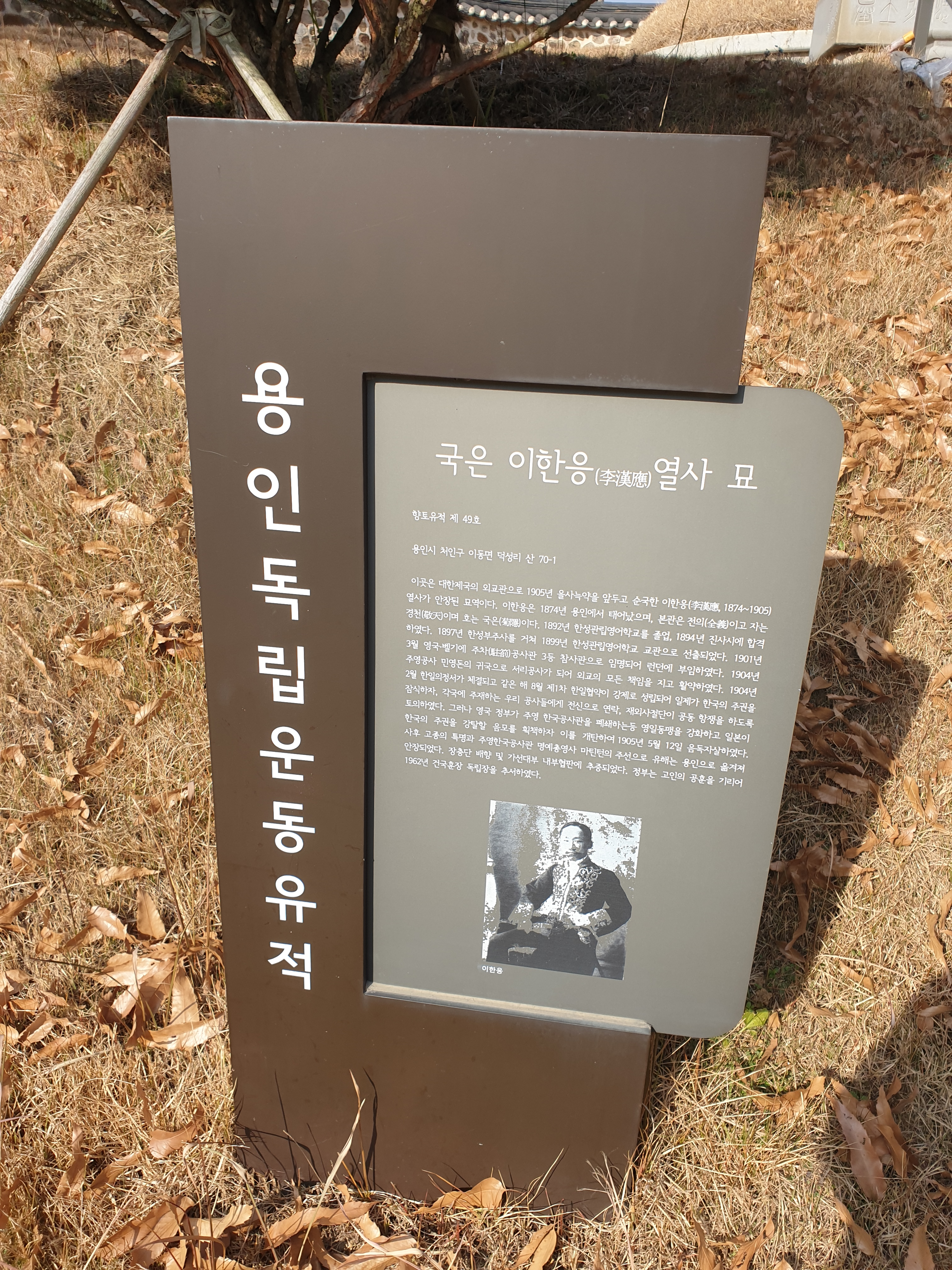
Yongin Independence Movement Site
