= Park Eunha =

South Korean diplomat

- 박은하
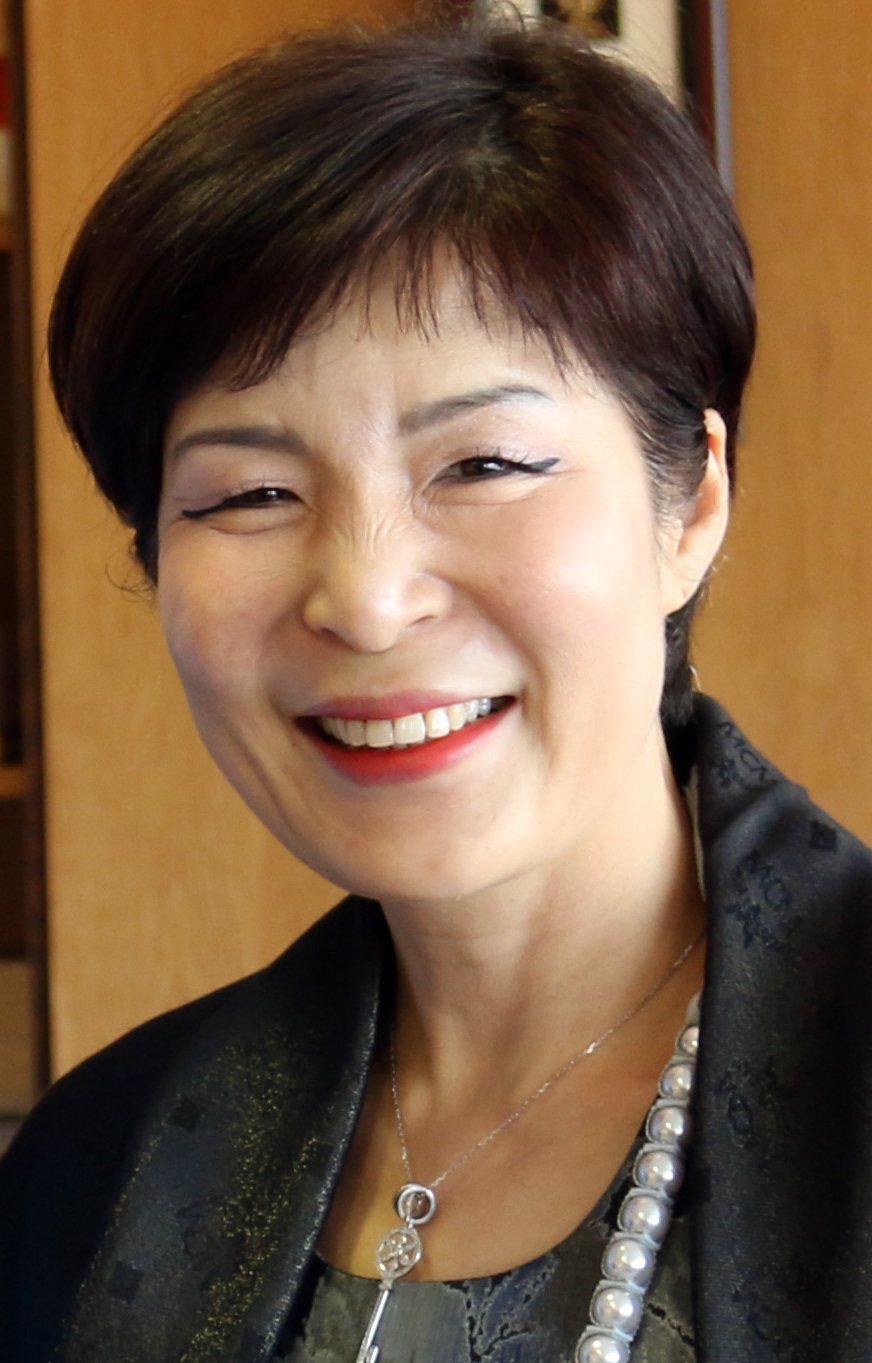
- Park at the headquarters of the International Maritime Organization in 2018

South Korean Ambassador to the UK
- In office 20 August 2018 – 9 July 2021
- President: Moon Jae-in
- Preceded by: Hwang Joon-kook
- Succeeded by: Kim Gunn

Personal details
- Born: 1962 (age 63–64)
- Education: Yonsei University; Columbia University

Park Eunha or Enna Park (Korean: 박은하; born 1962) is a South Korean diplomat served as the South Korean Ambassador to the UK during President Moon Jae-in administration from 2018 to 2021. She was the first woman to assume the post as well as the second woman and the first female career diplomat to represent Korea in P5 nations.

After passing the state exam in 1985, she has dedicated her professional career in public service - its diplomatic endeavors to be specific. She took numerous roles in the Ministry of Foreign Affairs and has served in Korean diplomatic missions to or consulate offices in India, United Nations in New York, New York, China and most recently the UK. Along with the roles taken in the foreign ministry, Park served as a protocol officer under President Kim Dae-jung during the first inter-Korean summit in 2000. In 2011 Park led Development Cooperation Bureau of the ministry which organised the Fourth High Level Forum on Aid_Effectiveness in Busan. Before becoming Ambassador to the UK, she served as Ambassador for Public Diplomacy - the third highest position in the Ministry. During this time, she promoted 2018 Winter Olympics in Pyeongchang.

She was previously the third woman to pass the state exam for diplomats and the first woman to do so with the highest score among her cohorts.

In July 2021 Park completed her term as the ambassador to the UK quoting Koreans being able to visit the UK via EPassport gates as her biggest accomplishment.

In September 2021 Park was recruited by Busan metropolitan government as its international relations envoy for their bid for Expo 2030.

She holds two degrees - a bachelor in history from Yonsei University and a master's in international relations from Columbia University.

== Awards ==
- Order of Service Merit by the government of South Korea (2009)
