= Naksansa bronze bell =

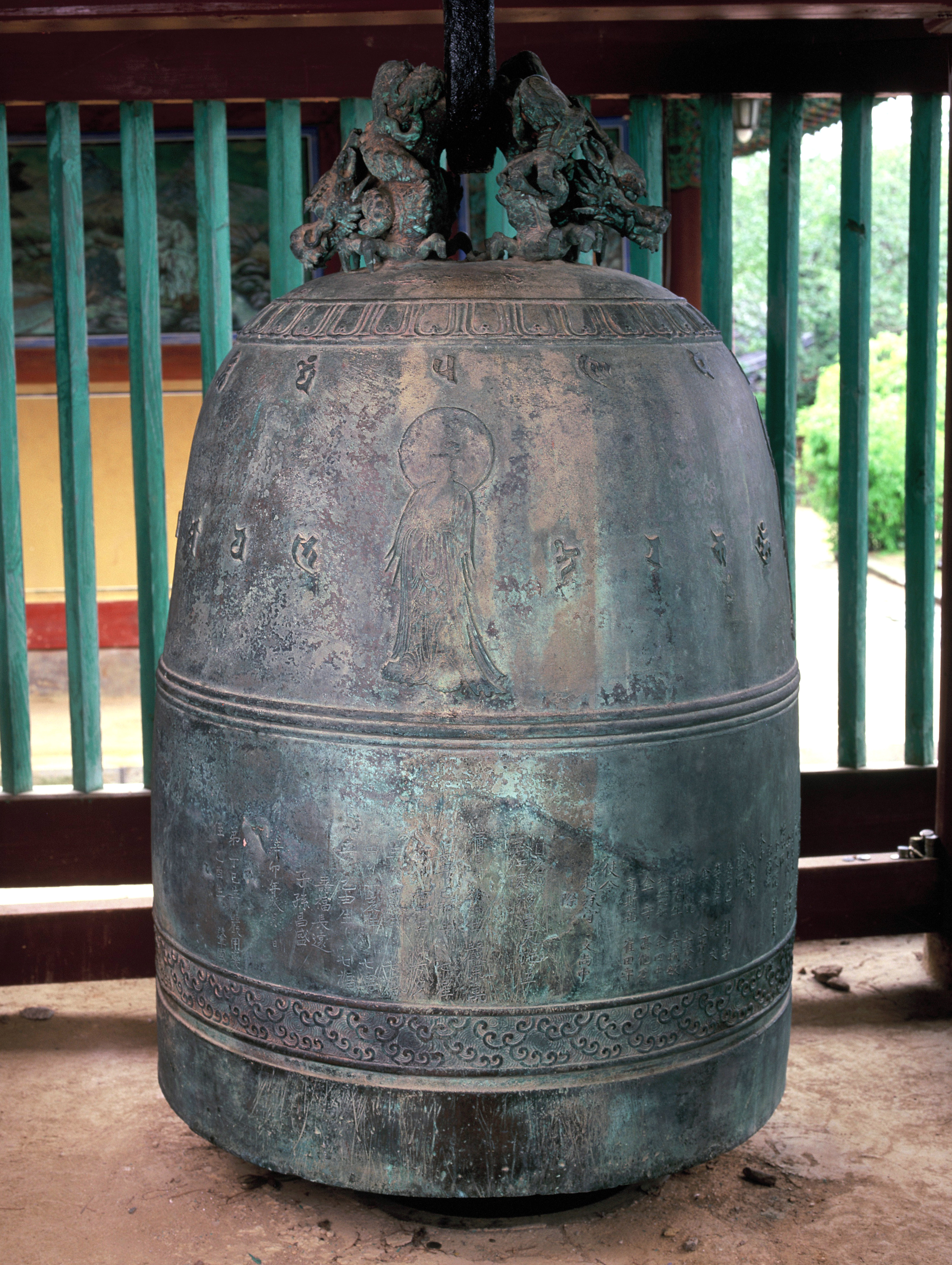
Bell in 2003

The Naksansa bronze bell (낙산사 동종) was a temple bronze bell of Naksansa. It was commissioned by Yejong of Joseon in 1469 to honor his late father, King Sejo. It was designated as a national treasure of Korea.

In the 5 April 2005 forest fire, the bell melted and destroyed. The remains of the bell were kept at the Korean National Research Institute of Cultural Heritage. The Cultural Heritage Administration withdrew it as a national treasure due to its destruction. In 2006, a replica of the bell was created and reinstalled in Naksansa.
