= Naksansa =

Buddhist temple in Gangwon, South Korea

- 낙산사
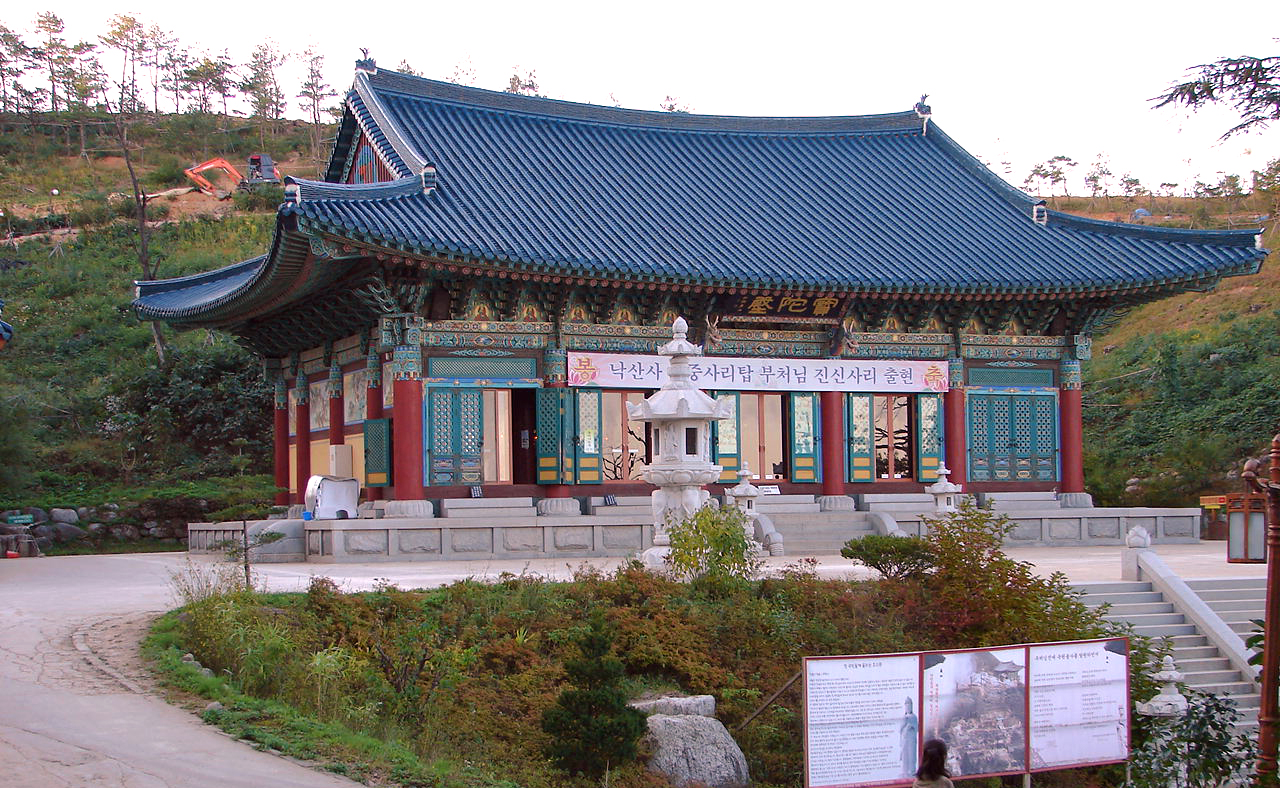
- Naksansa Temple

- Location within South Korea

Religion
- Affiliation: Jogye Order of Korean Buddhism
- Deity: Avalokitesvara

Location
- Location: 100 Naksansa-ro, Ganghyeon-myeon, Yangyang County, Gangwon Province
- Country: South Korea
- Coordinates: 38°07′28.7″N 128°37′41.0″E

Architecture
- Founder: Uisang
- Completed: 671
- Historic Sites of South Korea
- Official name: Naksansa Temple and Surroundings, Yangyang
- Designated: 2008-12-18
- Reference no.: 495

Naksansa (Korean: 낙산사; Hanja: 洛山寺) is a Buddhist temple in Yangyang, Gangwon Province, South Korea. It stands on the slopes of Obongsan Mountain (also called Naksan Mountain) and belongs to the Jogye Order. Established by Uisang in 671, it was designated as Historic Site in 2008.

Naksan is an abbreviation of Botarakgasan (보타락가산; 補陀洛伽山; lit. 'Mount Potalaka') where Avalokitesvara (Gwanseeum Bosal/Gwaneum) is believed to live. Naksansa is regarded as one of Gwandong Palgyeong (eight scenic sites of Gangwon) and one of 3 holy sites of Gwaneum.

== History ==
Naksansa was founded in 671 by Uisang Daesa (Grand Master), a Buddhist monk during the reign of King Munmu, after he had returned from studying abroad in Tang. While meditating near the cave in which Gwaneum was believed to have lived, he was told by the deity to build the temple there. On the other hand, Wonhyo did not realize that the woman he met on his way to Naksansa was Gwaneum and could not enter the cave where Gwaneum was staying when he arrived at the temple.

Most of the temple was destroyed by a forest fire in early Goryeo except temples dedicated to Gwaneum and Jeongchwi Bosal. However, the entire temple was burnt down during the Mongol invasions of Korea.

In the Joseon dynasty, the temple was repeatedly reconstructed and expanded by royal orders in 1467, 1469, 1631 and 1643.

The temple was completely burnt down in the Korean War. In 1953, Corps Commander Lee Hyung-geun restored wontongbojeon (beopdang housing a statue of Gwaneum) and beomjonggak and Ven. Woncheol restored the rest in 1976.

=== 2005 fire and reconstruction ===
Most of Naksansa was destroyed by a fire that started in the surrounding forest on April 5, 2005. The Naksansa bronze bell, a bell King Yejong made for his father in 1469, was also lost in the fire. Although it was designated as Treasure in 1968, it lost its designation in July 2005. Later, a replicate of the bell was installed in the temple.

Cultural Heritage Administration built wontongbojeon and Hongyemun in 2007 and Binillu in 2009. As of 2015, the temple is restored. The restoration was based on Naksansado, a 1778 painting by Kim Hongdo.

== Cultural properties ==
- Hongnyeonam (홍련암; 紅蓮庵) was built by Uisang as a hermitage above a stone cave. Its name originated from the story where hongnyeon (red lotus) sprung from the sea with Gwaneum in the middle after Uisang prayed for 7 days in front of the cave. It was repeatedly repaired in 18th to 20th century.
- Uisangdae (의상대; 義湘臺) is a pavilion built in 1925 on the spot where Uisang meditated. It was designated as Scenic Site in 2007 with Hongnyeonam.
- The Seven-story Stone Pagoda (칠층석탑), originally 3 stories high, became 7 stories in 1467. It is said that a Buddhist rosary and cintamani were sealed inside the pagoda. It follows the style of Goryeo but is more simplified. It was designated as Treasure in 1968.
- A stupa (공중사리탑) was built in 1692. Reliquaries from the stupa have high academical value because they were found without damage. In 2011, they were designated as Treasure with a stele.
- Dry-lacquered Seated Avalokitesvara Bodhisattva (건칠관음보살좌상) in wontongbojeon was made in early Joseon. It is designated as Treasure because each part of the statue is proportional and the crown on the head is important for studying crowns.
- The fence surrounding wontongbojeon is designated as Gangwon Tangible Cultural Heritage.
- Hongyemun (홍예문; 虹霓門) is a rainbow-shaped stone gate built at the entrance of the temple when King Sejo visited in 1467. It was designated as Gangwon Tangible Cultural Heritage in 1971.
- The 16m statue of Haesu-gwaneum (해수관음, Gwaneum that overlooks the sea) is on top of a hill. It was made in 1977 by sculptor Kwon Jeong-hwan. It is the largest Haesu-gwaneum statue in East Asia.

== Gallery ==
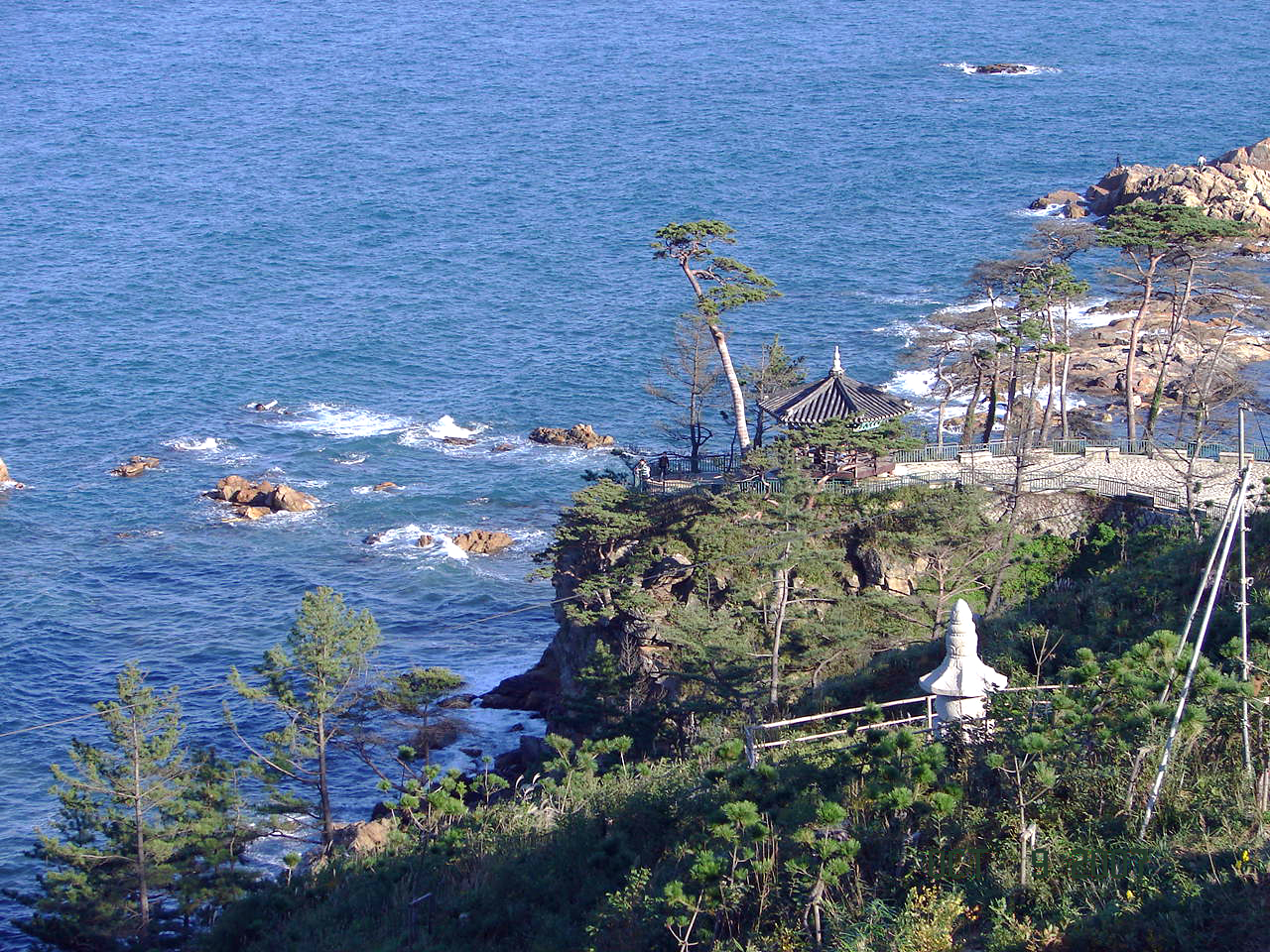
Uisangdae Pavilion clings to the rocks overlooking the East Sea

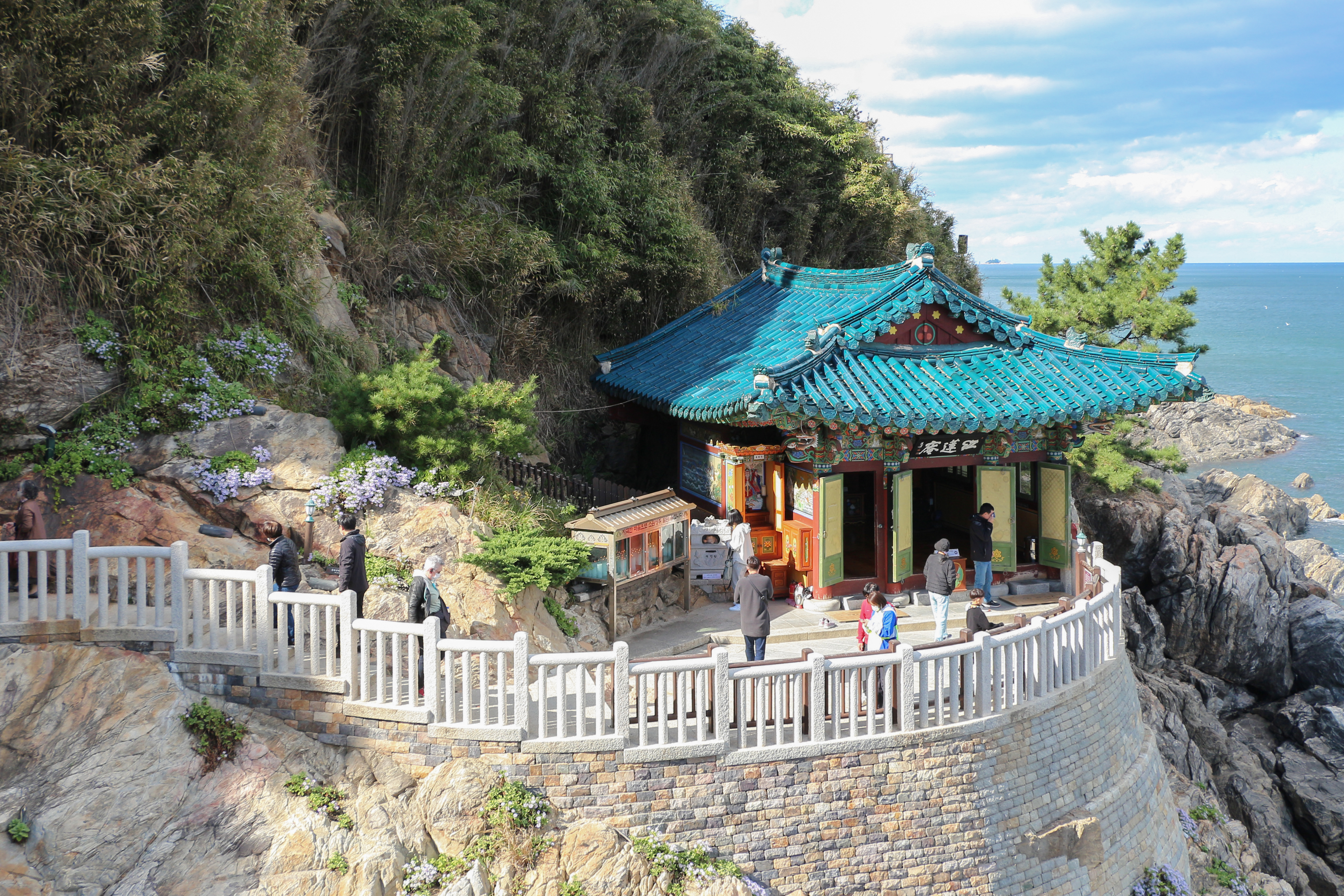
Hongnyeonam poised over the sea above the cave

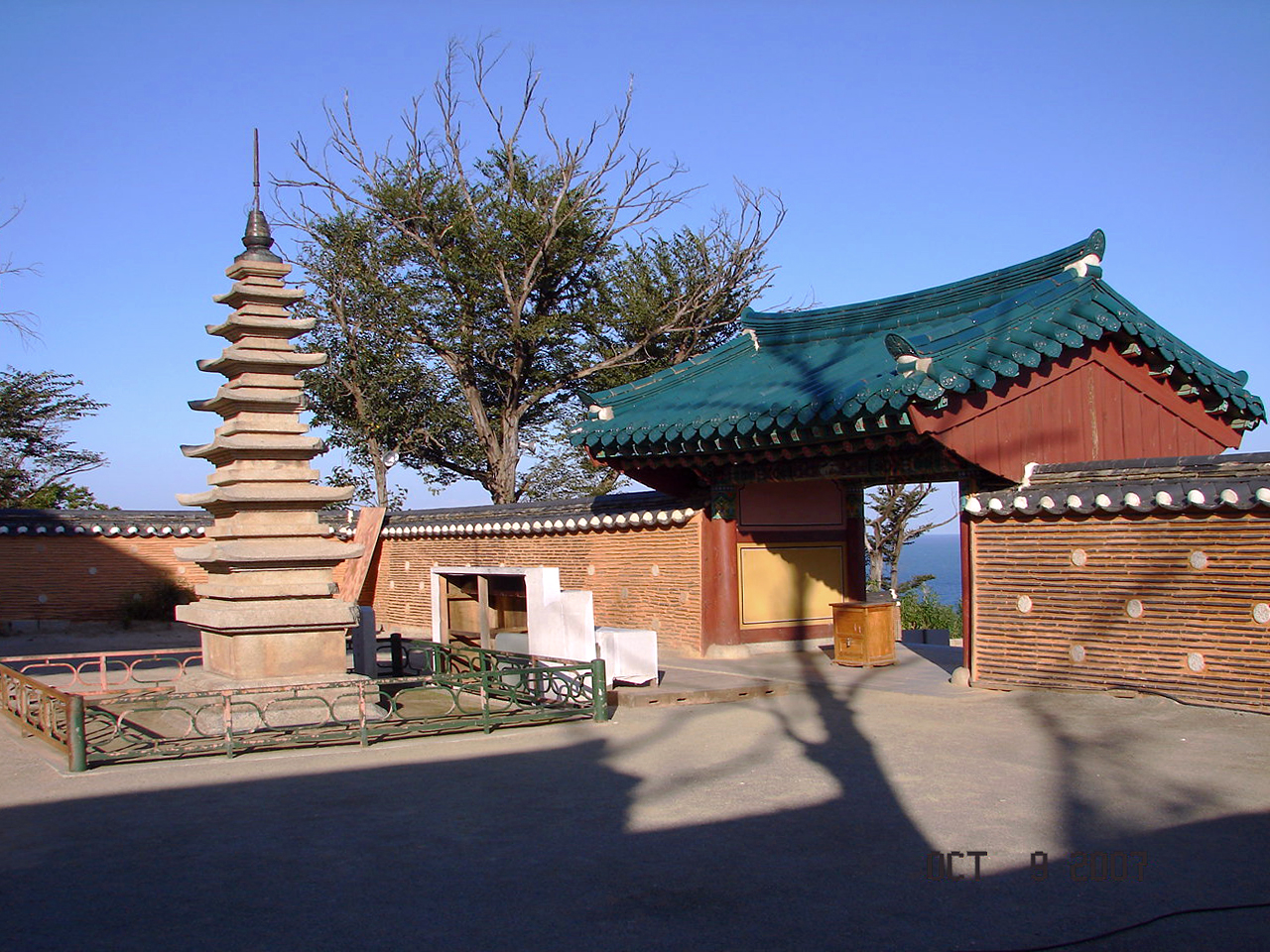
Naksansa's seven-story stone pagoda

Gwaneumji Pond, Bell/Drum Tower, Temple hall on the grounds of Naksansa

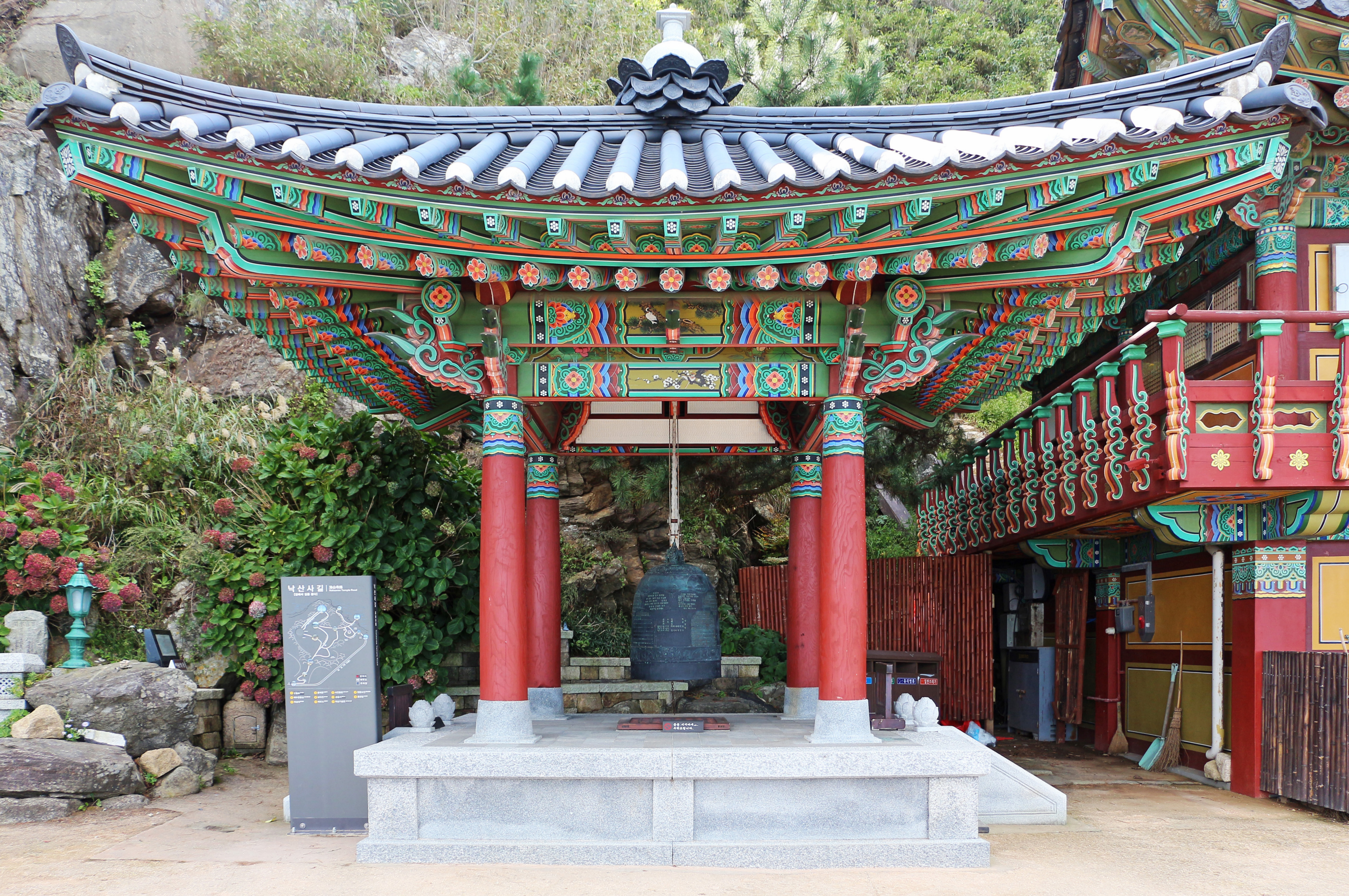
Bell Pavilion

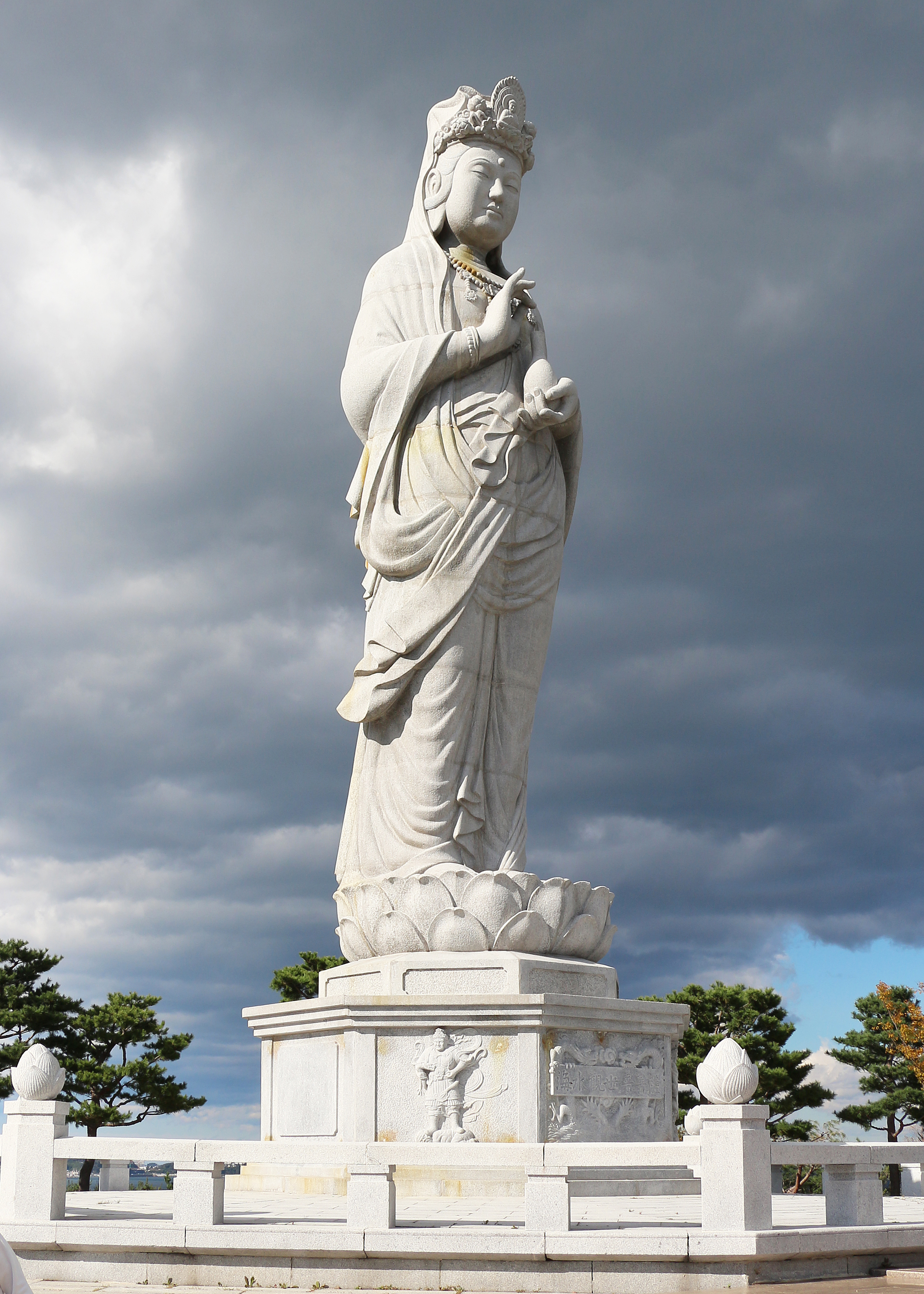
Haesugwaneum statue

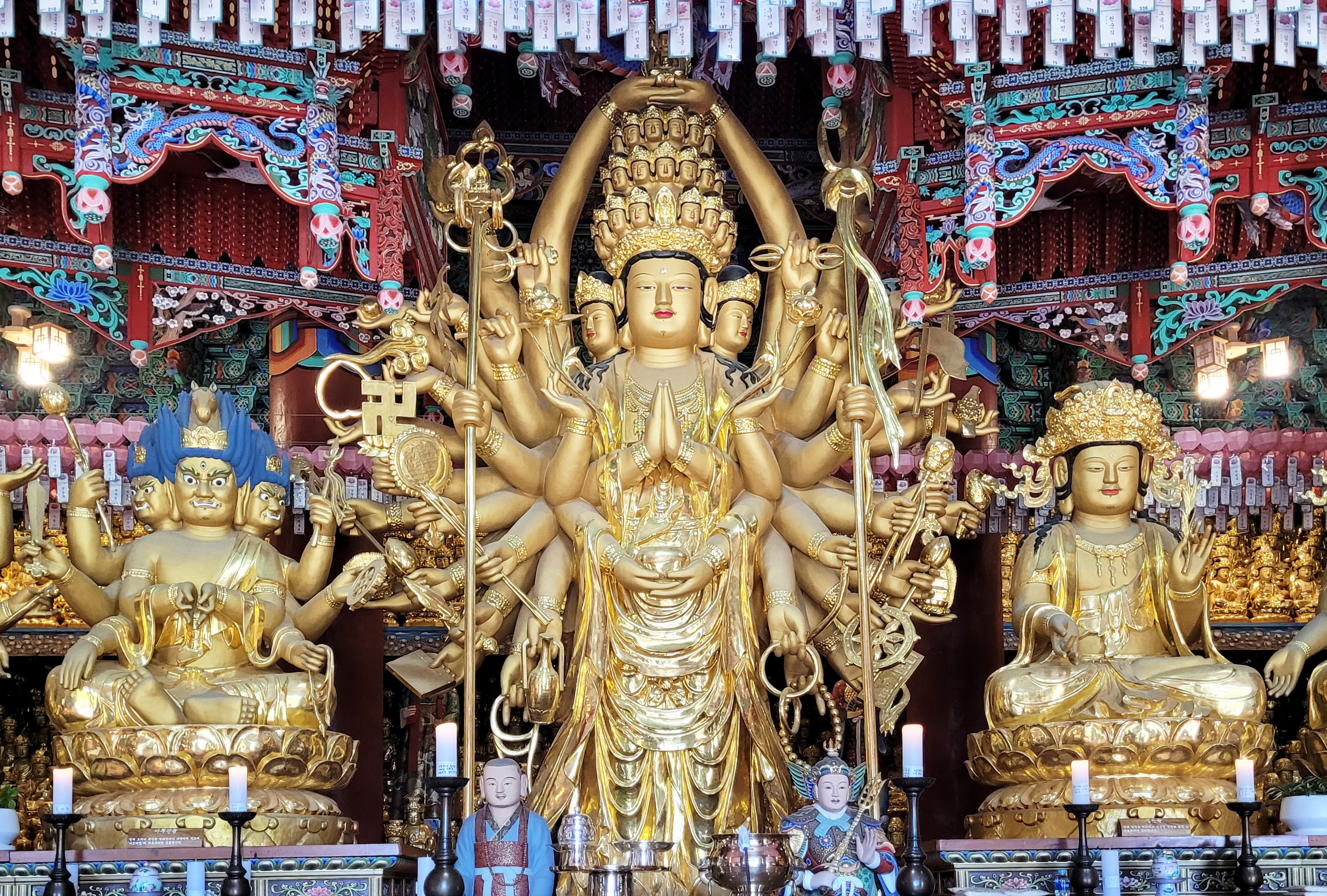
Statue of Avalokitesvara bodhisattva in Bota-jeon Hall

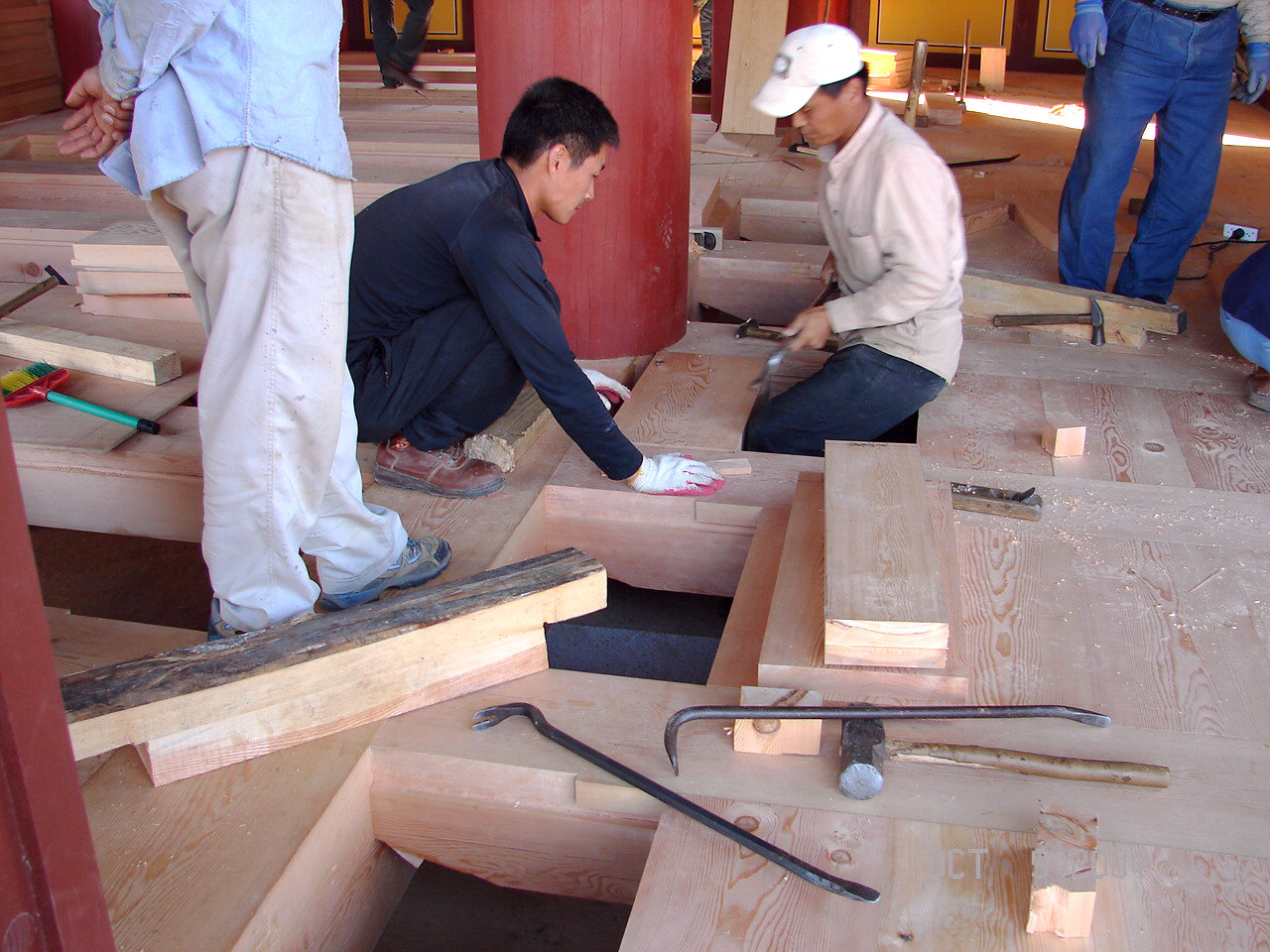
Craftsmen assemble flooring planks in a temple hall in 2007

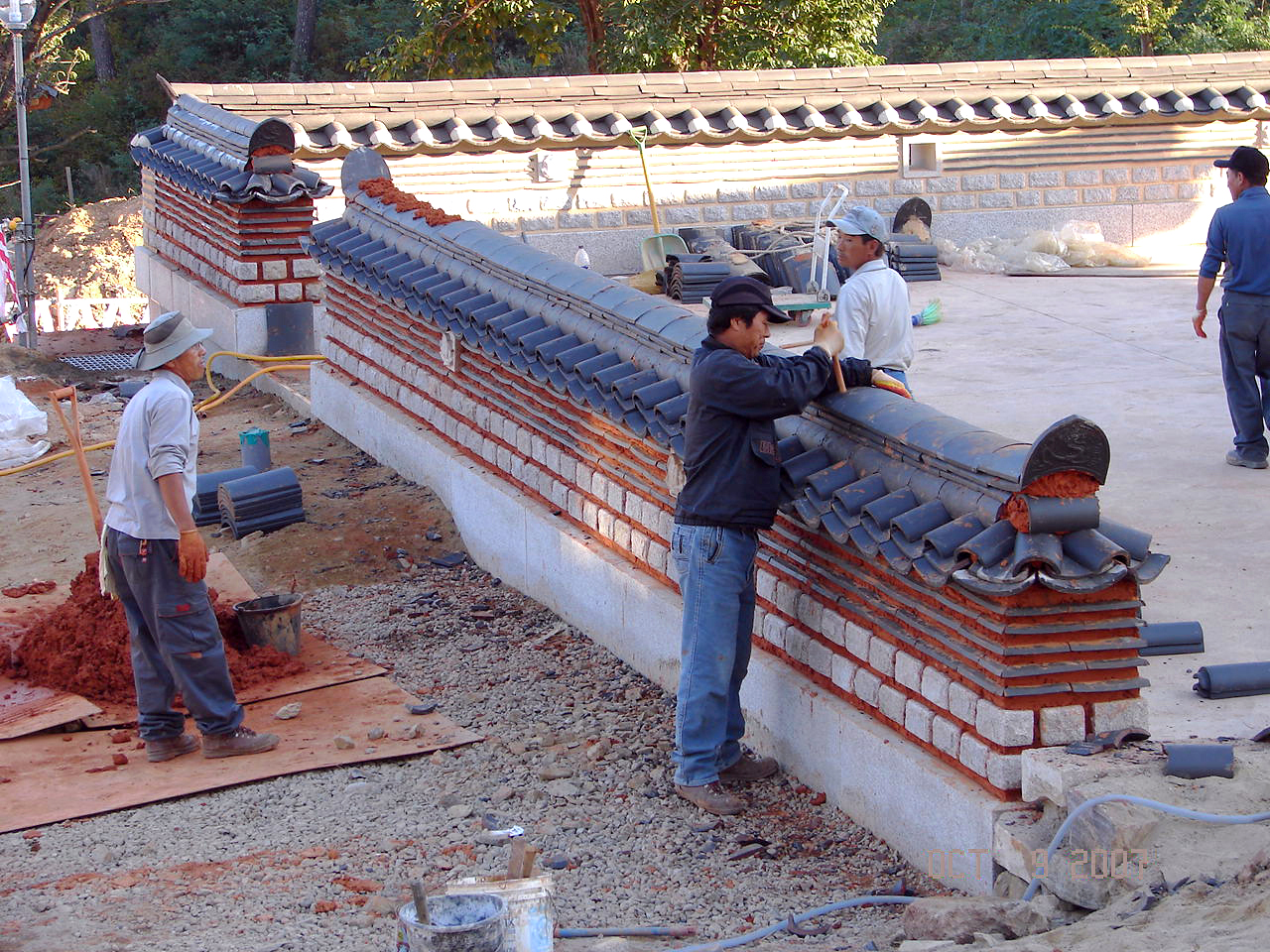
Craftsmen building a tile capped adobe wall in 2007

== See also ==
- Buddhist temples in Korea
