= Lee Hyung-geun =

South Korean general (1920–2002)

General Lee Hyung-geun
- 이형근
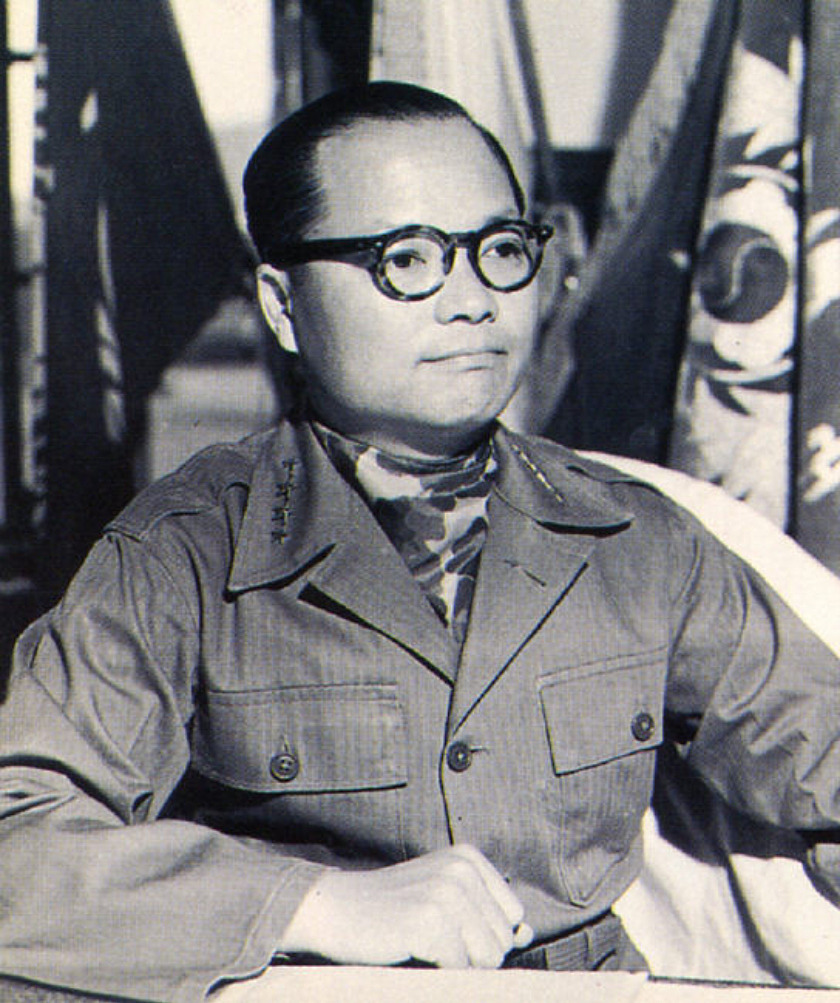
- Born: 11 December 1920; Gongju, Chūseinan-dō, Japanese Korea
- Died: 13 January 2002 (aged 81); Seoul, South Korea
- Spouses: Lee Hye-ran (1946–1950); Lee Kwi-ran (1952–1972)
- Children: Lee Hoon (son b. 1947); Lee Mi-kyung (daughter b.1949); Lee Hon, (son b.1950); Lee Ae-kyung (daughter b.1953); Lee Eun-kyung (daughter b.1956); Lee Bo-kyung (daughter b. 1957)
- Military career
- Allegiance: Empire of Japan; South Korea
- Branch: Imperial Japanese Army; Republic of Korea Army
- Service years: 1939–1945; 1946–1959
- Rank: General
- Service number: 10001
- Commands: Commander, I Corps, ROK Army; Commander, III Corps, ROK Army; Chief of Staff, ROK Army; Chairman, Joint Chiefs of Staff
- Conflicts: Korean War; Battle of the Soyang River
- Other work: Ambassador to Philippines (1961); Ambassador to UK etc. (1962–1967)

Korean name
- Hangul: 이형근
- Hanja: 李亨根
- RR: I Hyeonggeun
- MR: I Hyŏnggŭn

Lee Hyung-geun (Korean: 이형근; Hanja: 李亨根; 11 December 1920 – 13 January 2002) was a South Korean military officer and diplomat. A four-star general in the Republic of Korea Army, he later served as an ambassador (1961–1967).

== Early life and education ==
Lee Hyung-geun was born in Gongju, Chūseinan-dō, Korea, Empire of Japan on 11 December 1920 to Lee Ki-dong (father) and Ahn Jin-shil (mother). His father was the Korean agent of an American company. The oldest of five children, he had three brothers, Lee Sang-geun, Lee Young-geun, Lee Chong-geun, and a sister, Lee Ok-geun. After attending middle school at Kyunggi High School in Seoul, he graduated from Cheongju High School in Cheongiu.

== Family and later life ==
On 16 June 1946, Lee Hyung-geun married Lee Hye-ran (1927 – 1950), the daughter of Lee Eung-joon (former South Korean politician, Lieutenant General, and Army Chief of Staff). They had three children: Lee Hoon, a son born 21 July 1947; Lee Mi-kyung (Margaret Lee Kim), a daughter born 23 February 1949; and Lee Hon, a son born 7 September 1950. On 25 June 1952, he married Lee Kwi-ran (1933 – 1978). They had three daughters: Lee Ae-kyung (Anna Lee Trenchard), born 7 December 1953; Lee Eun-kyung (Esther Lee Yook), born 23 March 1956; and Lee Bo-kyung (Betty Lee) born 10 September 1957. His descendants include ten grandchildren and four great-grandchildren.

In 1953, he restored some of the buildings in Naksansa.

Lee Hyung-geun died in Seoul on 13 January 2002. After a funeral conducted by the Chairman of the Joint Chiefs of Staff, he was buried at the Daejeon National Cemetery on 17 January 2002.

== Career ==
=== Military career ===
==== 1939–1945 ====
In December 1939, while Korea was still under Japanese occupation, eighteen-year-old Lee Hyung-geun enrolled in the 56th officer-training class of the Junior Course School in Japan, the preparatory division of the Imperial Japanese Army Academy (IJAA). After graduating from the Junior Course in March 1941, Lee continued in the Senior Course Academy of the IJAA and graduated in 1942.

Lee was commissioned as a 2nd lieutenant in the Japanese Imperial Army and enrolled in the specialized Japanese Field Artillery School (JFAS). After graduating from the JFAS in 1943, he, by then an artillery captain, served in the Japanese Army in China and Vietnam until the end of World War II (14 August 1945).

==== 1945–1950 ====
In October 1945, Lee Hyung-geun, age twenty-four, returned to Korea, where he worked briefly as an English teacher at the Daejeon Middle School. The U.S. Military summoned him to Seoul to serve as an interpreter for Lee Eung-joon, advisor to the U.S. defense commander. On 5 December 1945, the U.S. military administration opened the Military Language School in Seoul to train military interpreters and the next generation of Korean officers, some of whom had served in the Japanese and Manchukuo armies. Lee was among the first group to enroll in the program but was exempted from some of the instruction because of his excellent English language skills. He graduated from the program in January 1946.

The rest of 1946 was eventful and significant for Lee. On 15 January, the South Korean Defense Guard (Guard) – the forerunner of the ROK Army – was established, replacing the Constabulary, and Lee was commissioned captain, becoming its first officer, with the serial number 10001. He was forever afterward known as "Number 1". In February, Lee became the founding commander of the 2nd Regiment of the Guard. On 1 May, the South Joseon Defense Academy (forerunner of the Korea Military Academy) was established, replacing the Military Language School, which closed on 30 April, and Major Lee was appointed as its first principal (superintendent), a position he held until 6 September 1946. He seems also to have served in the role of provost marshal for the Guard from 1 May through the end of the year. On 28 September, Lee at age twenty-five was appointed as the acting Commander-in-Chief of the Guard, the first Korean to hold this position, and served in the role until December.

After ceasing command of the Guard near the end of 1946, it is unclear what occupied Lee Hyung-geun during 1947, except becoming the father of his first child, a boy on 21 July. However, in February 1948 Lee became the Chief of Staff for the Department of Internal Security, the forerunner of the Ministry of National Defense, created the same day as South Korea (15 August 1948). Mid-year, Lee traveled to the U.S. to begin parts of two years studying military science. In August, he became the first Korean to enroll in the Advanced Course at the U.S. Army Infantry School at Fort Benning, GA.

In 1949, Lee Hyung-geun completed his advanced military education in the U.S., graduating from the Infantry School and the U.S. Army Staff College. After an assignment as the first military attaché at the ROK Embassy in Washington, DC, Lee returned to Korea, where on 20 June 1949, as Brigadier General, he became the first commander of the newly established 8th Army Division.

==== 1950–1953 ====
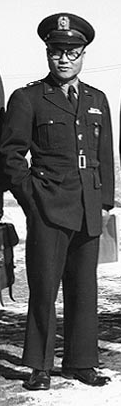
Lee Hyung-geun in 1951

A week before the Korean War began on 25 June 1950, Lee Hyung-geun was appointed Commander of the 2nd Division of the Army and two days later transferred to the division headquarters at Daejeon. On the morning of the 25th, the Chief of Staff ordered Brigadier General Lee to move his troops 120 miles north to stage a counterattack against North Korean forces the next day. Instead, he assumed a defense position and did not attack. On 16 October 1950, the III Corps of the ROK Army was established and Major General Lee became its first commander.

In August 1951, Lee Hyung-geun became the commander of the Korean Army Training Center. On 10 July 1951, the Armistice talks began between the United Nations Command (UNC) on one side and the North Korea and China on the other side. Although the ROK government did not support the process, the UNC delegation usually included one member of the ROK Army. During the period 24 October 1951 – 6 February 1952, Lee was the second such South Korean participant.

Early in 1952, Lee Hyung-geun was Commander of the ROK Army I Corps, although the timing of his appointment is not clear. One source indicates that he was appointed to the role on 16 November 1951; most assert that he became commander in January 1952. He may also have had a short-term appointment (28 March to 12 April) as Commander of I Corps in 1951. On 2 December 1952, U.S. President-elect, Dwight D. Eisenhower, went to Korea to assess the war situation and to visit troops, commanders, and Korean leaders. Lee, who was among the latter, is said to have opposed Eisenhower's notion that the atomic bomb should be used to end the war quickly claiming, "It is good for the war to end quickly, but both South and North Korea will perish together".

A location known as “Hill 351” came into play at least once toward the end of the war and involved Lee Hyung-geun as Commander of ROK Army I Corps. However, it seemed more important to Koreans than to Americans. The latter largely ignored it, (Note: Some Korean sources also do not mention Hill 351, such as:) e.g., not including it in a detailed, official combat chronology of the war. Several Korean sources not only mention a Battle of Hill 351 but, in some cases, consider it to be very significant. However, they disagree on the date, even while usually linking Lee to the battle. Some locate it in 1952. Others report it occurring in 1953, before the Armistice signing. Still others simply mention the battle without a date. Because the contents of all these accounts tend to suggest two different events, it is likely that there were two Battles of Hill 351 – one in 1952, the other in 1953 – with the second more important than the first, because it extended the northeast part of the Armistice line well north of the 38th Parallel.

After 1,128 days of conflict and 748 days of peace talks, hostilities in the Korean War ceased on 27 July 1953 with the signing of the Armistice Agreement. Although the war did not officially end then or since, the agreement established a division of the Korean Peninsula roughly along the 38th Parallel, around which most of the battles had occurred inconclusively during the two previous years.

==== 1953–1960 ====
About seven months after the Armistice signing, thirty-four-year-old General Lee Hyung-geun was appointed on 17 February 1954 (some date this 14 February) to the newly created position of Chairman of the Joint Chiefs of Staff, a post he held until 27 June 1956. From the latter date until 17 May 1957, Lee served as the ninth Army Chief of Staff. In this capacity and at the invitation of Free China, General Lee visited Taiwan in February 1957, where he inspected troops and military facilities. In August 1958, he retired from active military service. However, he returned to serve as the interim Army Chief of Staff (23 February – 6 August 1959), after which he ended his military service and transferred to the Army Reserve. On 16 July 1960, Lee became the eighth President of the Korean Veterans Association.

==== Korean Army ranks ====
Throughout his military career in Korea, Lee Hyung-geun attained the following ranks in the South Korean Defense Guard and the ROK Army:

- Captain, Guard (15 January 1946)
- Major, Guard (1 May 1946)
- Colonel, ROK Army (February 1948)
- Brigadier General, ROK Army (20 June 1949)
- Major General, ROK Army (16 October 1950)
- Lieutenant General, ROK Army (May 1952)
- General, ROK Army (14 February 1954)

=== Diplomatic career ===
After his active duty with the ROK Army, Lee Hyung-geun was appointed to represent the ROK government as ambassador to several nations. In June 1961, forty-year-old Lee became the fourth Ambassador Extraordinary and Plenipotentiary to the Philippines. The next year he was appointed as the fourth Ambassador Extraordinary and Plenipotentiary to the United Kingdom, serving 16 August 1962 – 11 December 1967. While in this role, he served concurrently as the ROK Ambassador to Denmark, Norway, Sweden, Iceland, Malta, Sierra Leone, Gambia, and Malawi.

=== Other positions ===
Lee Hyung-geun returned to South Korea late in 1967 and continued to serve the ROK as a private citizen for many years. In February 1969, Lee was appointed Chairman of the President's Advisory Commission on Government Administration. He became President of the Korean Anti-Communist League in November 1976. Lee was Chairman of the Korean British Society (1976–1977). He became a Member of the Legislative Assembly in October 1980 and served as a Member of the President's Advisory Council on State Affairs (April 1981 – 1988). In 1989, Lee was a Member of and Counselor to the President's Advisory Council for National Unification.

== Honors and decorations ==
Lee Hyung-geun received many honors, medals, and decorations, some multiple times, from the ROK and several other countries, including the following:

- 1st Class Order of Military Merit (ROK) - twice
- 1st Class Order of Diplomatic Service Merit (ROK)
- Presidential Citation (ROK) - four times
- Silver Star (US)
- Legion of Merit (US) - four times
- Légion d’honneur (France)
- Order of Expeditionary Forces (Greece)
- Honorary Decoration from the Pope (Vatican)
