= List of ambassadors of South Korea to Mongolia =

The ambassador of South Korea to Mongolia has existed since 1990. Choe Jin-won is the current South Korean ambassador to Mongolia, having been appointed in April 2024.

== Ambassador ==
- Kwon Young-soon, 1990–1992
- Kim Gyo-sik, 1992–1994
- Kim Jeong-sun, 1994–1997
- Hwang Gil-sin, 1997–1999
- Choi Young-chul, 1998–2002
- Kim Won-tae, 2001–2004
- Geum Byeong-mok, 2004–2006
- Park Jin-ho, 2006–2009
- Jeong Il, 2009–2012
- Lee Tae-ro, 2012–2015
- Oh Song, 2015–2018
- Jeong Jae-min, 2018–2019
- Lee Yeo-hong, 2019–2022
- Kim Jong-gu, 2022–present

== See also ==
- Foreign relations of South Korea
