= Paik Ji-ah =

South Korean ambassador

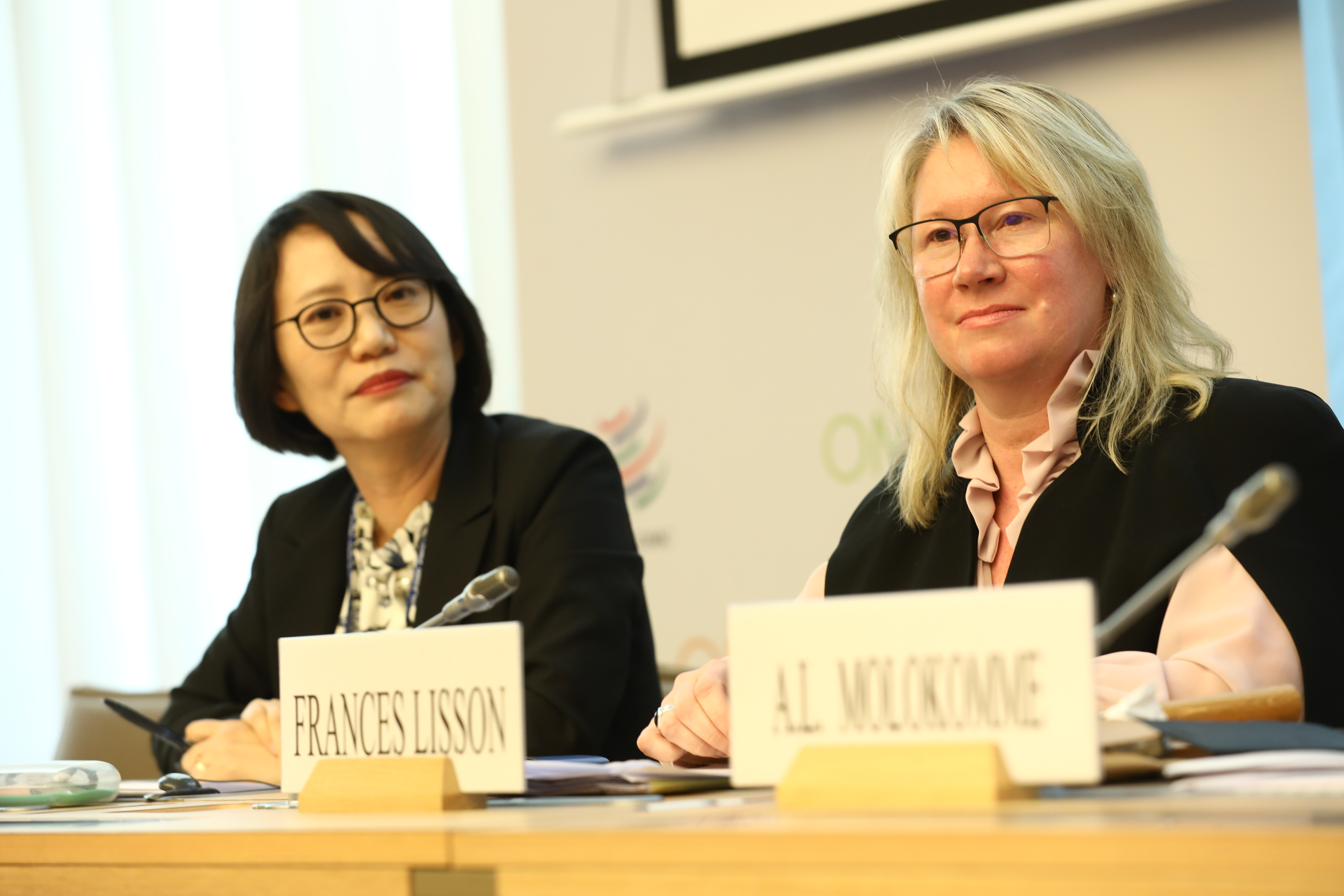
Paik Ji-ah (left)

Paik Ji-ah (Korean: 백지아; Hanja: 白芝娥; born 1 January 1963) is South Korean Ambassador to United Nations and the other international organizations in Geneva. She was previously the president of the Institute of Foreign Affairs and National Security of the Korea National Diplomatic Academy, South Korea. She is the first woman to be appointed to a deputy minister-level post in the South Korean Foreign Ministry.

== Career ==
- Jan. 1985: Joined the Ministry of Foreign Affairs (MOFA)
- Jan. 1991: Consul, Consulate General of South Korea, New York, United States
- Aug. 1992: Second Secretary, Permanent Mission of South Korea to the United Nations in New York, United States
- Dec. 1998: First Secretary, Embassy of South Korea, Bangkok, Kingdom of Thailand
- Feb. 2001: Secondment to the Office of the President
- Feb. 2002: Director, Human Rights and Social Affairs Division, Office of Policy Planning and International Organizations, Ministry of Foreign Affairs and Trade (MOFAT)
- Dec. 2003: Counsellor, Permanent Mission of South Korea to the United Nations Office and Other International Organizations in Geneva, Switzerland
- Jun. 2006: Minister-Counsellor, Embassy of South Korea, Kuala Lumpur, Malaysia
- Jul. 2009: Deputy Director-General, International Organizations Bureau, MOFAT
- Oct. 2009: Concurrently Commissioned as Ambassador for Population Issues, MOFAT
- Aug. 2010: Director-General for International Organizations, MOFAT
- Dec. 2012: Ambassador-at-large for the Security Council Affairs, MOFAT
- Apr. 2013: Ambassador and Deputy Permanent Representative, Permanent Mission of South Korea to the United Nations in New York, United States
- Nov. 2015: Ambassador for International Security Affairs, Ministry of Foreign Affairs (MOFA)
- Mar. 2016: Deputy Minister for Planning and Coordination, MOFA
- Feb. 2017: President of the Institute of Foreign Affairs and National Security, Korea National Diplomatic Academy (KNDA), MOFA
- Apr. 2018: Ambassador Extraordinary and Plenipotentiary to the United Nations Office and Other International Organizations in Geneva, Switzerland
