= Embassy of South Korea, London =

Diplomatic mission of South Korea in the United Kingdom

Embassy of the Republic of Korea in London
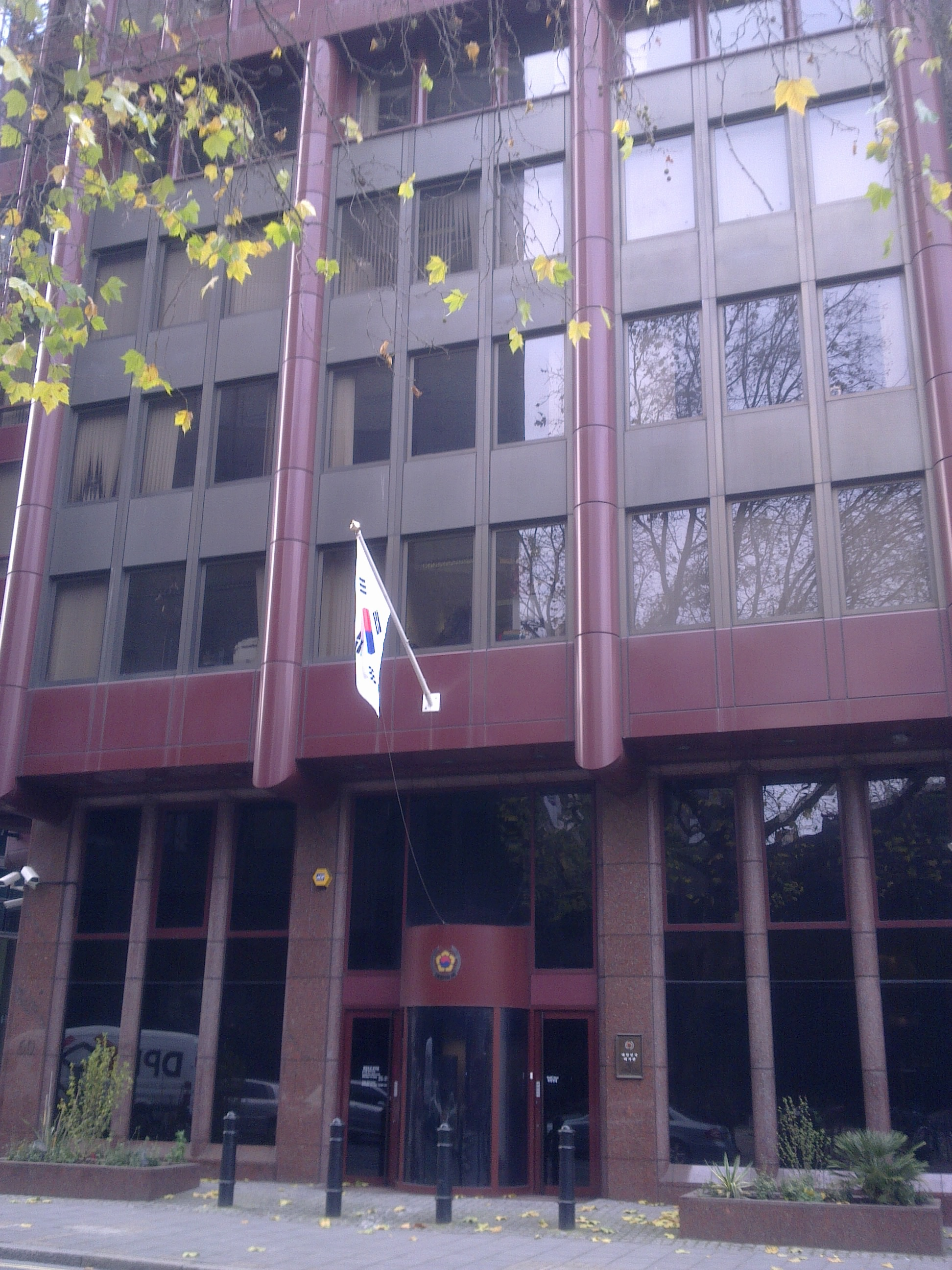
- Location: Westminster, United Kingdom
- Address: 60 Buckingham Gate, London, SW1E 6AJ
- Coordinates: 51°29′52.9″N 0°8′11.7″W
- Ambassador: Kim Heung-chong

The Embassy of South Korea in London, England, is the diplomatic mission of South Korea in the United Kingdom. This mission also functions as a permanent mission to International Maritime Organization. South Korea also maintains a Cultural Centre at 1-3 Strand. The official ambassador's residence is a villa (detached and double fronted) at 4 Palace Gate, Kensington.

As of 2023, South Korea's Ambassador to the United Kingdom of Great Britain and Northern Ireland is Yoon Yeocheol.

== Gallery ==
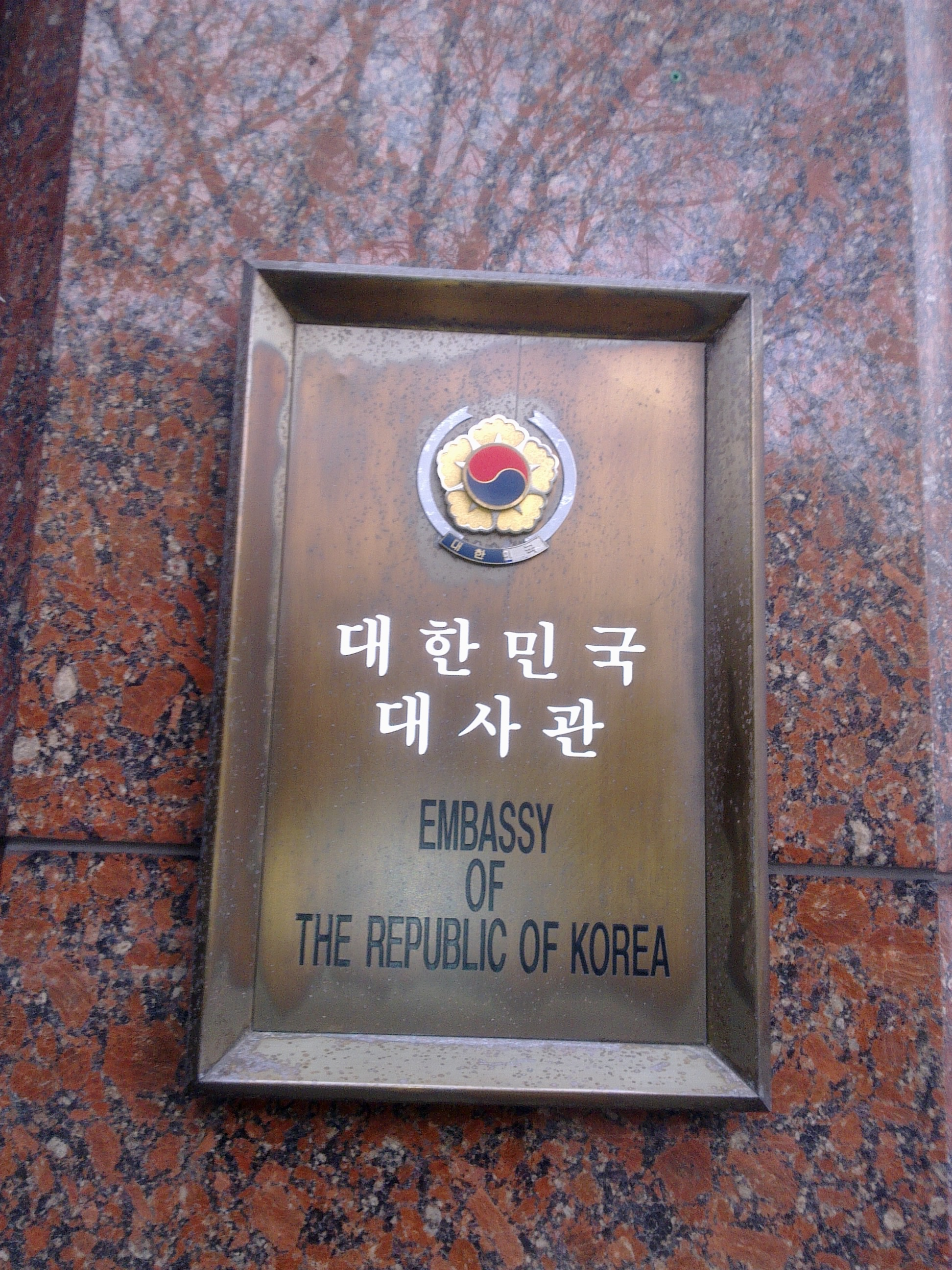
Plaque outside the embassy in English language and Korean depicting the Emblem of South Korea

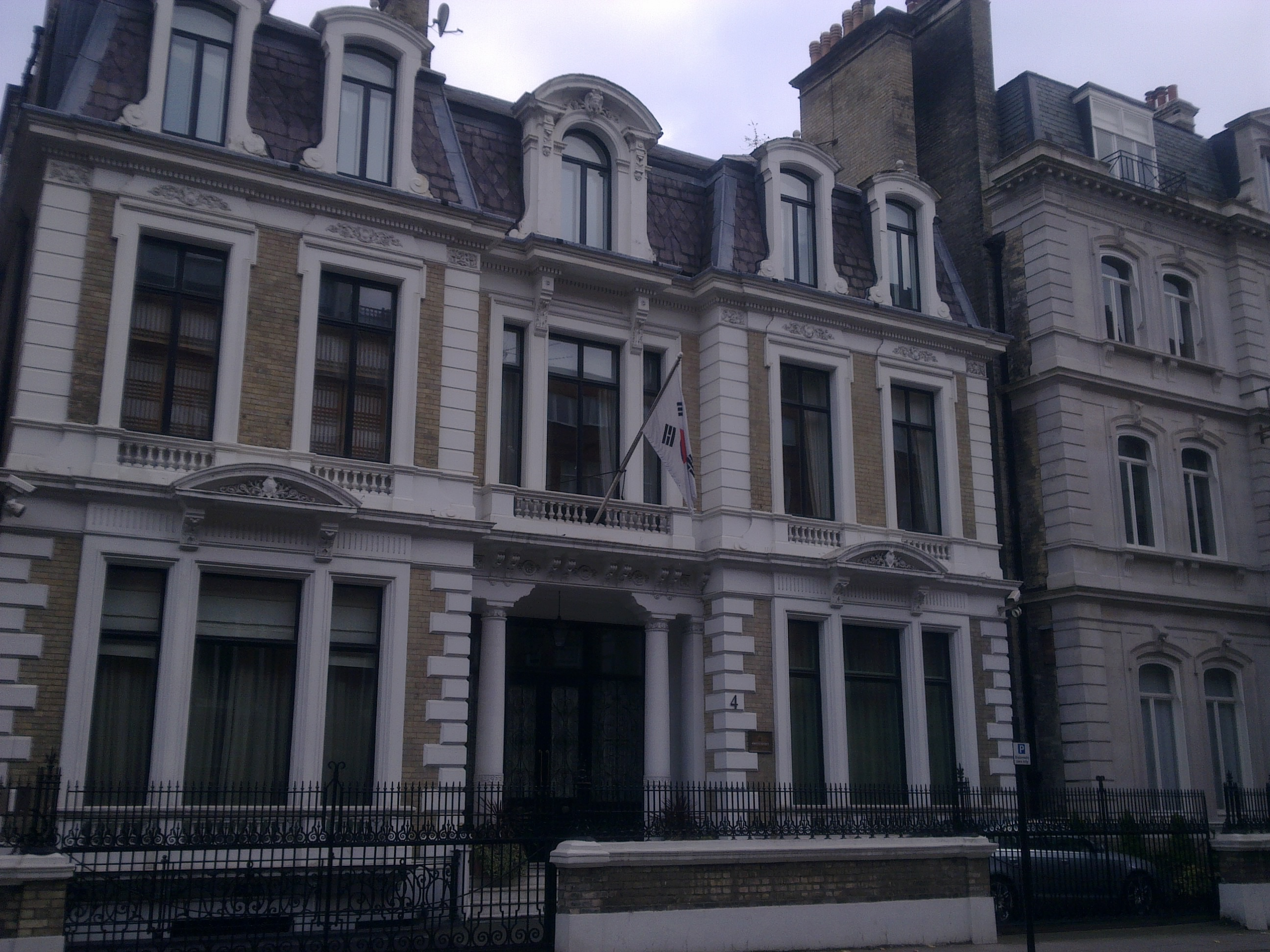
The building at 4 Palace Gate, South Kensington.

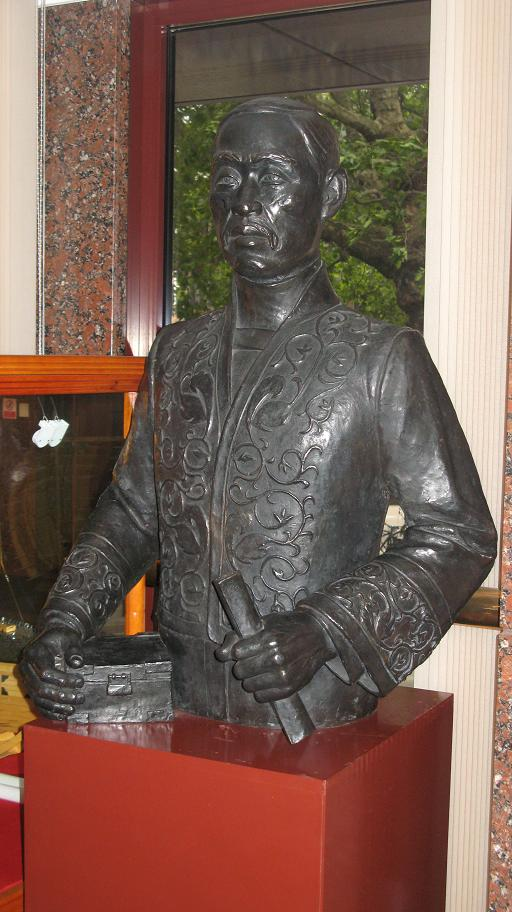
Statue of Yi Han-eung, Korean Chargé d'Affaires to UK who died in London in May 1905
