= Cho Hyun-ok =

South Korean politician (born 1956)

- 조현옥

South Korean Ambassador to Germany
- Incumbent
- Assumed office 5 November 2020
- President: Moon Jae-in
- Preceded by: Chung Beom-koo

Senior Presidential Secretary for Personnel Affairs
- In office 11 May 2017 – 28 May 2019
- President: Moon Jae-in
- Succeeded by: Kim Oe-sook

Personal details
- Born: 21 September 1956 (age 69) Seoul, South Korea
- Education: Ewha Womans University; Heidelberg University

Korean name
- Hangul: 조현옥
- Hanja: 趙顯玉
- RR: Jo Hyeonok
- MR: Cho Hyŏnok

Cho Hyun-ok (Korean: 조현옥; born 21 September 1956), also known as Cho Hyun-ock, is a South Korean politician previously served as President Moon Jae-in's first Senior Presidential Secretary for Personnel Affairs - the first woman to assume such post - and currently serving as his ambassador to Germany from 2020.

After working at research institutes and civil societies, Cho joined the office of Senior Presidential Secretary for Personnel Affairs under then-President Roh Moo-hyun. She later joined Park Won-soon-led Seoul Metropolitan Government as its director of Women and Family Policy Affairs Office.

Cho previously worked with Moon during his 2017 presidential campaign as its vice chair of gender equality committee. After serving as his first Senior Presidential Secretary for Personnel Affairs from 2017 to 2019, Cho was appointed as his second ambassador to Germany in November 2020.

Cho holds three degrees in politics - a bachelor and a master's from Ewha Womans University and a doctorate from Heidelberg University.

== Awards ==
- United Nations Public Service Awards category 4 (2015): Seoul Metropolitan Government for" Fighting Violence against Women: Making Seoul a Safer City for Women"
