= List of ambassadors of South Korea to the Philippines =

Ambassador of Republic of Korea to the Republic of the Philippines
- 주 필리핀 공화국 대한민국 특명전권대사; Sugo ng Republika ng Korea sa Republika ng Pilipinas
- Emblem of the Republic of Korea
- Incumbent; Lee Sang-hwa since 10 July 2023
- Ministry of Foreign Affairs
- Style: Mr. Ambassador (informal); His Excellency (diplomatic)
- Reports to: Minister of Foreign Affairs
- Seat: Taguig, Metro Manila, Philippines
- Appointer: The president
- Term length: No fixed term
- Formation: November 1953
- First holder: Kim Young-gi
- Website: Embassy of South Korea, Manila

The ambassador of the Republic of Korea to the Republic of the Philippines (Korean: 주필리핀대한민국대사; Filipino: Sugo ng Republika ng Korea sa Republika ng Pilipinas) is the Republic of Korea's foremost diplomatic representative in the Republic of the Philippines. As head of South Korea's diplomatic mission there, the ambassador is the official representative of the president and the government of South Korea to the president and government of the Philippines. The position has the rank and status of an ambassador extraordinary and plenipotentiary and is based at the embassy located in Taguig.

== List of representatives ==
#	Name		Took office	Left office
1	Kim Young-gi	김영기	November 1953	July 1957
2	Kim Hoon	김훈	July 1957	November 1960
3	Shin Dong-gi	신동기	November 1960	June 1961
4	Lee Hyung-geun	장이욱	June 1961	August 1962
5	Kim Yong-shik	유양수	August 1962	March 1963
6	Yoo Yang-soo	유양수	November 1963	September 1967
7	Yoon Seok-heon	윤석헌	November 1967	December 1969
8	Kim Se-ryun	김동조	December 1969	June 1973
9	Jang Ji-ryang	장지량	June 1973	May 1976
10	Kang Young-gyu	강영규	May 1976	April 1980
11	Song Gwang-jeong	송광정	April 1980	September 1981
12	Lee Nam-gi	이남기	September 1981	April 1984
13	Kim Chang-hoon	김창훈	April 1984	March 1987
14	An Jan-seok	안재석	March 1987	February 1989
15	No Jeong-gi	노정기	February 1989	December 1992
16	Lee Chang-soo	이창수	December 1992	December 1994
17	Lee Jang-chun	이장춘	February 1995	October 1997
18	Park Dong-soon	박동순	October 1997	February 1999
19	Shin Sung-oh	신성오	February 1999	August 2001
20	Song San-ha	손상하	August 2001	March 2004
21	Yu Myung-hwan	유명환	March 2004	July 2005
22	Hong Jong-ki	홍종기	October 2005	September 2008
23	Choi Joong-kyung	최중경	September 2008	April 2010
24	Lee Hye Min	이혜민	July 2010	September 2012
25	Lee Hyuk	이혁	September 2012	April 2015
26	Kim Jae-shin	김재신	April 2015	8 January 2018
27	Han Dong-man	한동만	January 2018	December 2020
28	Kim Inchul	김인철	February 2021	2023
29	Lee Sang-hwa	이상화	10 July 2023	Incumbent

== See also ==
- Foreign relations of the Philippines
- Foreign relations of South Korea
- List of ambassadors of the Philippines to South Korea
